= 1988 Houston Astros season =

1988 Houston Astros
- League: National League
- Division: West
- Ballpark: The Astrodome
- City: Houston, Texas
- Record: 82–80 (.506)
- Divisional place: 5th
- Owners: John McMullen
- General managers: Bill Wood
- Managers: Hal Lanier
- Television: KTXH; HSE
- Radio: KTRH (Bill Brown, Milo Hamilton, Larry Dierker, Bruce Gietzen, Bill Worrell); KBUC (Orlando Sánchez-Diago, Rolando Becerra)

The 1988 Houston Astros season was the 27th season for the Major League Baseball (MLB) franchise located in Houston, Texas, their 24th as the Astros, 27th in the National League (NL), 20th in the NL West division, and 24rd at The Astrodome. The Astros entered the season having completed a 76–86 record and in third place, 14 games behind the division champion San Francisco Giants.

On April 5, Mike Scott made his second Opening Day start for the Astros. They hosted the San Diego Padres and won, 6–3, also the 2,000th victory in franchise history. During the amateur draft, the Astros selected outfielder Willie Ansley in the first round at 7th overall, infielder Dave Silvestri in the second round, and outfielder Kenny Lofton in the 17th round.

Pitcher Bob Knepper represented the Astros at the MLB All-Star Game, and played for the National League, his second career selection.

The Astros concluded the season with an 82–80 record, in fifth place and 12 1/2 games behind the division champion and World Series champion Los Angeles Dodgers. Pitcher Nolan Ryan, who led the NL in strikeouts (228) for a second consecutive and in his final season as an Astro, made for the third consecutive season an Astros hurler led the league in strikeouts for the first time in franchise history

== Offseason ==
- October 13, 1987: Catcher Ronn Reynolds was released by the Houston Astros.
- December 8, 1987: Third baseman Ed Whited was traded by the Houston Astros with pitcher Mike Stoker (minors) to the Atlanta Braves for Rafael Ramírez and cash.
- January 8, 1988: Pitcher Joaquín Andújar was signed as a free agent by the Astros.
- March 10, 1988: Ernie Camacho was signed as a free agent by the Astros.
- March 25, 1988: Robbie Wine was traded by the Astros to the Texas Rangers for Mike Loynd.

== Regular season ==
=== Summary ===
==== April ====
Opening Day starting lineup
Uniform	Player	Position
2	Gerald Young	Center fielder
28	Billy Hatcher	Left fielder
19	Bill Doran	Second baseman
27	Glenn Davis	First baseman
29	Denny Walling	Third baseman
14	Alan Ashby	Catcher
21	Terry Puhl	Right fielder
16	Rafael Ramírez	Shortstop
33	Mike Scott	Pitcher
Venue: Astrodome • Houston 6, San Diego 3 Sources:

On April 5, the Astros hosted the San Diego Padres on Opening Day, with right-hander Mike Scott making his second consecutive Opening Day start. In the top of the eighth, he surrendered two runs to the Padres. However, in the bottom of the inning, Kevin Bass' two-run single keyed a five-run rally which stood as Houston held on for the 6–3 win. Hence, the decision for the pitching win went to Scott. The Opening Day victory was also the 2,000th win in the history of the Houston Astros franchise. (Note: Houston's milestone win that doubled this total, 4,000, was another Opening Day victory, the one that commenced the 2013 season for their first game as an American League (AL) team, hosting the Texas Rangers at Minute Maid Park.)

On April 10, Kevin Bass, pinch hitting for right fielder Terry Puhl, hit the Astros' first-ever grand slam at Riverfront Stadium, and the Astros' first grand slam against Cincinnati since June 11, 1964, by Bob Aspromonte. Bass took Pat Perry deep in the top of the ninth inning as the Astros routed the Cincinnati Reds, 12–3. Glenn Davis (4) also homered. Mike Scott (2–0) earned the victory and complete game. This was also the fourth pinch-hit grand in Astros team history, with the most recent having been hit by teammate Craig Reynolds on April 12, 1986.

On April 27, Nolan Ryan came within two outs of his sixth no-hitter, maintaining a 2–0 lead over the Philadelphia Phillies in the top of the ninth, when Mike Schmidt singled into center field. In the bottom of the third inning, Bill Doran singled home Rafael Ramírez and Gerald Young, staking Houston to a 2–0 lead. Leading off the top of the ninth, Greg Gross' weak grounder to second allowed him to reach via an error, Schmidt singled, Juan Samuel struck out, and Von Hayes flied out. Lance Parrish then lined a two-run double to the left-center field gap to tie the game, with both runs being unearned. Ryan departed with a game score of 84. With the bases loaded in the bottom of the tenth, Glenn Davis scored as the walk-off run when Craig Reynolds hit into a fielder's choice. Dave Smith (1–1) retired the Phillies in order in the top of the tenth to earn the win.

==== May ====
On May 8, Bill Doran tied a major league record among second basemen for a 9-inning game by turning six double plays.

Having gone more than two years since his most recent complete game, on May 13, Nolan Ryan went the distance to lead an 8–2 win over the Chicago Cubs. First baseman Glenn Davis collected four runs batted in (RBI), while Gerald Young stroked four hits to lead the Astros' offense.

With strong windy conditions all around Pittsburgh on May 23, the Astros held a 3–0 advantage going into the ninth inning. However, the game was called due to debris on the field at Three Rivers Stadium, and Mike Scott, who had held the Pirates scoreless for 8 innings, got the win.

==== June ====
On June 6, Gerald Young became the first player in club history to reach base six times within a nine-inning game, and seventh overall. He reached on two singles and drew four base on balls. Young also looted three bases. (Note: Without reaching via error. For single games, playing for HOU, in the regular season, requiring times on base ≥ 6, sorted by ascending date.) Kevin Bass (12), Terry Puhl (3), and Billy Hatcher (16) each also performed larceny on the basepaths. Glenn Davis homered (12), and he, and Denny Walling each delivered three RBI to lead a 10–6 triumph over the Los Angeles Dodgers. Bob Knepper (7–1) allowed two runs in six frames to pick up the victory.

On June 12, Mike Scott was denied a second career no-hitter when Ken Oberkfell of the Atlanta Braves laced a clean single to right field with two outs in the ninth inning. Oberkfell's single was the only blemish on an otherwise stellar evening for Scott as he fanned eight, walked none, and led the Astros to victory, 5–0. Terry Puhl, Kevin Bass and Craig Reynolds each contributed three hits.

Craig Biggio made his major league debut at catcher on June 26 in a 6–0 win over the San Francisco Giants. Though he went hitless, Biggio stole second base and scored Houston's final run. Starting in place of an injured Alan Ashby, at the plate, Biggio also drew a walk, struck out and flied out. During the second inning, Biggio pegged José Uribe at third base for his first baserunner caught stealing. Biggio caught southpaw Jim Deshaies, also the winning pitcher.

On June 29, Biggio singled off Orel Hershiser during the third inning at the Astrodome for his first major league hit. Biggio also pilfered his second base. However, Hershiser (12–3) was dominant, hurling a two-hit, 2–0, shutout victory to outduel Ryan (5–6), who took the defeat. Ryan yielded four hits, four walks and two runs while striking out 10 over 7 1/3 frames.

==== July ====
During the nightcap of a doubleheader on July 1 at Shea Stadium, Biggio led off the top of the third inning with a short line drive off Rick Aguilera down the left field line for his first double and extra-base hit in the major leagues. During the top of the 13th inning, Kevin Bass singled in Billy Hatcher for the game-winning run and 6–5 triumph over the New York Mets. Rafael Ramírez recorded his first four-hit game as a member of the Astros.

==== Nolan Ryan: 100 wins each on two teams in two leagues ====
During a nationally-televised broadcast on July 9, Nolan Ryan earned his 100th victory in an Astros uniform. He joined Cy Young as the only major leaguers to win 100 or more games each with two teams, along with 100 games each in the National and American Leagues. Ryan also had 138 wins as a member of the California Angels. Winless over his previous seven starts while carrying a personal seven-game losing streak to the Mets, Ryan allowed three runs on eight hits over 7 1/3 frames, walking three and striking out five in a 6–3 Astros triumph. This was Ryan's 267th career win overall, ranking him 28th at the time.

Prior to the milestone win with Houston, Ryan (6–7) had already paralleled Young, Jim Bunning, Gaylord Perry, and Ferguson Jenkins with the feat of attaining 100 victories in each league. Moreover, Ryan became the seventh pitcher to have won at least 100 contests with two clubs, which included Young, Pud Galvin, John Clarkson, Bob Caruthers, Grover Cleveland Alexander, and Lefty Grove.

After a sluggish start by Ryan, the Astros found themselves in a three-run hole early against baseball's best team 53–32 (.624). However, four Astros responded with multi-hit games. In the second inning, Glenn Davis and Buddy Bell scorched back-to-back singles, prior to a ground rule double by Billy Hatcher that blazed over the center field wall. With one run in, Mets starter Sid Fernandez then halted additional damage by retiring Rafael Ramírez on a foul out, and struck out Biggio and Ryan.

In the third, a control lapse by Fernandez opened an opportunity Gerald Young, who led off the inning with a walk, stole second base, advanced to third on Gary Carter's throwing error, and scored on a wild pitch.

During his second inning of relief, Rick Aguilera (0–4) began to lose touch of his command, issuing three base on balls. Davis, Bell, and Hatcher each stung run-scoring singles. Biggio then drew a bases-loaded walk to force in the Astros' sixth run.

The Astros won their second game in a row after having lost six in a row at home for the first time since the outset of the 1983 campaign.

Ryan became the fifth moundsman to claim at least 100 victories for the Astros, following Larry Dierker, Don Wilson, J. R. Richard, and Joe Niekro. Biggio was the starting catcher as Ryan's batterymate, just his 12th contest as a major leaguer.

==== Rest of July ====
On July 17, Glenn Davis connected for the 100th home run of his career, launching an offering from Mike Maddux deep to left field. This shot occurred in the top of the sixth at Veterans Stadium, breaking a scoreless tie.

==== August ====
On August 22, Craig Biggio cranked his first major league home run, a tie-breaking solo shot served by Rich Gossage that touched off an extra-innings rally past the Chicago Cubs. Later in the top of the tenth inning, Gerald Young scored on a misplay of Kevin Bass' fly ball to center field, and Davis followed with a single to score Bass and raise the score, 9–6. In the bottom of the tenth, a balk called on Juan Agosto scored Shawon Dunston; however, Agosto (10–0) buckled down to record the final out and preserve a 9–7 Houston triumph, extending a personal winning streak to the longest in club history.

==== September ====
Owing both to longevity and a propensity to issue walks, on September 8, Ryan furnished just the second complete game of his career without having issued any base on balls. This was the 184th complete game for "The Ryan Express." (Note: First occurrence was on June 12, 1983.) (Note: Nolan Ryan, for single games, in complete games, in the regular season, sorted by ascending bases on balls.) Ryan (11–11) led the Astros to a 2–1 win over Los Angeles at Dodger Stadium, yielding five hits and whiffing seven. Kirk Gibson's home run to deep right in the bottom of the fourth was the only play that prevented a shutout. In the top of the fourth, Ryan's batterymate, Alex Treviño, homered to temporarily inject a 1–0 lead for Houston. In the top of the eighth, Glenn Davis singled to right field and advanced on a throwing error by Mike Davis. Buddy Bell followed with a single to center which scored Davis for the go-ahead run, 2–1.

On September 14, Ryan maintained the momentum and delivered a second consecutive outing that featured a complete game without a base on balls. He struck out 13 as Houston defeated the Cincinnati Reds, 7–1.

The Astros became the fifth chapter of Orel Hershiser's scoreless innings streak on September 19, during which Hershiser totaled a major-league record 59. Los Angeles defeated Houston, 1–0, as Hershiser (22–8) fired a four-hit shutout. The only run of the contest arrived via a solo home run from John Shelby in the top of the seventh off a Danny Darwin offering (7–12), who allowed just three hits over six frames in relief of Nolan Ryan. Ryan, the Astros' starter for the game, departed after two innings due to a hamstring cramp. Prior to the injury, Ryan struck out four and issued a base on balls to Franklin Stubbs, hallmarking a career-long streak of 21 consecutive innings without having issued a base on balls, This would be his final appearance in an Astros uniform.

Bob Knepper tossed his first career one-hit shutout on September 21, and second shutout of the season, leading a 1–0 triumph over the Atlanta Braves. Knepper also obtained his top game score of the season at 91. Knepper (14–5) faced the minimum, yielding just one walk while striking out seven. The lone blemish was Dale Murphy's slow roller to third base for a leadoff single in top of the second inning. In the bottom of the eighth, Gerald Young singled in Ken Caminiti for the contest's only run off Pete Smith. Smith nearly matched Knepper pitch for pitch, earning a complete game despite an eight-inning loss.

==== Performance overview ====
The Astros concluded the season with an 82–80 record, in fifth place and 12 1/2 games behind the division- and World Series-champion Los Angeles Dodgers. In spite of the fifth-place ranking, this finalization indicated the team's seventh winning campaign over the prior ten dating to 1979—at the time, a figure superior to any ten-year span in club history. The Astros also drew over 1.9 million fans for the second consecutive season, an increase of nearly 24 thousand, and most since 1980. This was the third consecutive season drawing an attendance of at least 1.7 million, also a club first.

Nolan Ryan concluded the season as the NL leader in strikeouts (228), his second consecutive (270 in 1987), and in his final season as a Houston Astro. (Note: Ryan followed up the strikeout titles in 1987 and 1988 with two more in succession in the American League (AL), while aggregating 11 total during his career.) Counting Mike Scott's strikeout title in 1986 (306), this was the third consecutive season that an Astros hurler had led the league in strikeouts, the first time in franchise history that this had been accomplished. It was Houston's fifth individual strikeout title in 11 seasons. Moreover, Ryan joined J. R. Richard as the second Astros hurler to win consecutive strikeout titles (303 in 1978 and 313 in 1979). As it was with the season prior, Ryan again became the oldest pitcher in major-league history to lead the in strikeouts.

Except for the 1986 season, Ryan led the Astros pitching staff in strikeouts in eight of the nine seasons he was with the team. He left Houston their franchise leader in strikeouts (1,866), furnished the most 10-strikeout contests (53), and the most 200-strikeout seasons (five). (Note: Number of seasons player meets criteria, playing for HOU, in the regular season, requiring strikeouts ≥ 200, sorted by descending instances.) Ryan departed for the Texas Rangers during the offseason.

This roster included pitchers with a portfolio of eight career no-hitters, with five (at the time) by Nolan Ryan, (Note: Pitched a total of 7 no-hitters.) two by Bob Forsch, and one by Mike Scott. The 1988 staff tossed three one-hit complete games. Two additional no-hit bids were broken up in the ninth inning: Nolan Ryan on April 27, and Mike Scott on June 12; while, on September 21, Bob Knepper hurled a one-hit shutout.

The Astros set a club record with 198 stolen bases, surpassing 1980 squad, in which they aggregated 194 stolen bases.

Gerald Young also set the individual franchise single-season stolen base record with 65 bags, outdistancing the 61 by César Cedeño in 1977. Young became the third baserunner in franchise history with 50 or more steals, while this was the eight such campaign overall. Cedeño generated the first six—all successively—launching in 1972, and Billy Hatcher joined Cedeño in 1987. (Note: For single seasons, playing for HOU, in the regular season, requiring stolen bases ≥ 50, sorted by descending stolen bases.)

Manager Hal Lanier was dismissed from his post following three seasons leading the Astros, concluding his tenure with a record of 254–232 (.523). In 1986, Lanier became the first Houston Astro to win the NL Manager of the Year Award, having guided the Astros to a then-club-record 96 victories and third NL West division title. However, the Astros slipped in the standings to third place in 1987 and fifth in 1988.

=== Roster ===
1988 Houston Astros
Roster
Pitchers: 49 Juan Agosto; 42 Larry Andersen; 47 Joaquín Andújar; 13 Ernie Camacho; 50 Rocky Childress; 44 Danny Darwin; 43 Jim Deshaies; 31 Bob Forsch; 31,41 Jeff Heathcock; 39 Bob Knepper; 53 Dave Meads; 35 Brian Meyer; 34 Nolan Ryan; 33 Mike Scott; 45 Dave Smith	Catchers: 14 Alan Ashby; 6 Mark Bailey; 4 Craig Biggio; 9 Alex Treviño; Infielders: 25 Buddy Bell; 11 Ken Caminiti; 1 Casey Candaele; 27 Glenn Davis; 19 Bill Doran; 23 Chuck Jackson; 20 Jim Pankovits; 16 Rafael Ramírez; 12 Craig Reynolds; 29 Craig Smajstrla; 6 Harry Spilman; 29 Denny Walling	Outfielders: 17 Kevin Bass; 3 Cameron Drew; 18 John Fishel; 28 Billy Hatcher; 5 Steve Henderson; 26 Louie Meadows; 21 Terry Puhl; 2 Gerald Young	Manager: 22 Hal Lanier; Coaches: 8 Yogi Berra (Bench); 10 Gene Clines (Hitting); 48 Matt Galante (First Base); 54 Marc Hill (Bullpen); 15 Denis Menke (Third Base); 55 Les Moss (Pitching)

=== Notable transactions ===
- July 23, 1988: Mark Bailey was traded by the Astros to the Montreal Expos for Casey Candaele.
- August 31, 1988: Denny Walling was traded by the Astros to the St. Louis Cardinals for Bob Forsch.

== Game log ==
=== Regular season ===
Legend
	Astros win
	Astros loss
	Postponement
	Eliminated from playoff race
**Bold**	Astros team member

1988 regular season game log: 82–80 (Home: 44–37; Away: 38–43)
April: 14–7 (Home: 10–3; Away: 4–4)

#	Date	Time (CT)	Opponent	Score	Win	Loss	Save	Time of Game	Attendance	Record	Box/ Streak	
1	April 5		Padres	6–3						1–0		
2	April 6		Padres	5–1						2–0		
3	April 8		@ Reds	8–3 (16)						3–0		
4	April 9		@ Reds	4–5						3–1		
5	April 10		@ Reds	12–3						4–1		
6	April 12		@ Braves	8–3						5–1		
7	April 13		@ Braves	4–0						6–1		
8	April 14		Reds	9–3						7–1		
9	April 15		Reds	2–4 (10)						7–2		
10	April 16		Reds	2–8						7–3		
11	April 17		Reds	5–3						8–3		
12	April 19		Braves	4–5						8–4		
13	April 20		Braves	1–0						9–4		
14	April 21		Braves	8–0						10–4		
15	April 22		@ Padres	1–3						10–5		
16	April 23		@ Padres	0–4						10–6		
17	April 24		@ Padres	0–3						10–7		
18	April 26		Phillies	3–1						11–7		
19	April 27		Phillies	3–2 (10)						12–7		
20	April 29		Expos	6–4						13–7		
21	April 30		Expos	3–0						14–7		=

May: 13–14 (Home: 7–5; Away: 6–9)

#	Date	Time (CT)	Opponent	Score	Win	Loss	Save	Time of Game	Attendance	Record	Box/ Streak
22	May 1		Expos	3–7 (14)						14–8	
23	May 2		@ Phillies	1–7						14–9	
24	May 3		@ Phillies	4–0						15–9	
25	May 4		@ Mets	0–8						15–10	
—	May 5		@ Mets	Postponed (rain); Makeup: July 1							
26	May 6		@ Expos	5–6 (11)						15–11	
27	May 7		@ Expos	3–4						15–12	
28	May 8		@ Expos	7–2						16–12	
29	May 9		Mets	6–2						17–12	
30	May 10		Mets	2–5						17–13	
31	May 11		Mets	8–9 (10)						17–14	
32	May 13		Cubs	8–2						18–14	
33	May 14		Cubs	3–1						19–14	
34	May 15		Cubs	1–2						19–15	
35	May 16		Pirates	9–2						20–15	W1
36	May 17		Pirates	3–2						21–15	W2
37	May 18		Pirates	4–2						22–15	W3
38	May 20		@ Cardinals	5–3						23–15	
39	May 21		@ Cardinals	4–7 (11)						23–16	
40	May 22		@ Cardinals	2–1						24–16	
41	May 23		@ Pirates	3–0						25–16	W2
42	May 24		@ Pirates	4–5						25–17	L1
43	May 25		@ Pirates	3–4						25–18	L2
44	May 27		@ Cubs	2–3						25–19	
45	May 28		@ Cubs	7–14						25–20	
46	May 29		@ Cubs	7–1						26–20	
47	May 30		Cardinals	5–4						27–20	
48	May 31		Cardinals	7–9						27–21	

June: 13–16 (Home: 7–7; Away: 6–9)

#	Date	Time (CT)	Opponent	Score	Win	Loss	Save	Time of Game	Attendance	Record	Box/ Streak
49	June 1		Cardinals	2–3 (13)						27–22	
50	June 3		@ Giants	8–4						28–22	
51	June 4		@ Giants	2–8						28–23	
52	June 5		@ Giants	3–9						28–24	
53	June 6		@ Dodgers	10–4						29–24	
54	June 7		@ Dodgers	5–2						30–24	
55	June 8		@ Dodgers	1–11						30–25	
56	June 9		@ Dodgers	2–4						30–26	
57	June 10		Braves	3–10 (13)						30–27	
58	June 11		Braves	5–4 (11)						31–27	
59	June 12		Braves	5–0						32–27	
60	June 13		Braves	6–5						33–27	
61	June 14		@ Reds	1–7						33–28	
62	June 15		@ Reds	3–5						33–29	
63	June 16		@ Reds	7–4						34–29	
64	June 17		@ Braves	3–4						34–30	
65	June 17		@ Braves	5–6						34–31	
66	June 18		@ Braves	14–7						35–31	
67	June 19		@ Braves	6–4						36–31	
68	June 20		Reds	1–2						36–32	
69	June 21		Reds	3–1						37–32	
70	June 22		Reds	5–1						38–32	
71	June 24		Giants	0–11						38–33	
72	June 25		Giants	1–4						38–34	
73	June 26		Giants	6–0						39–34	
74	June 27		Dodgers	0–4						39–35	
75	June 28		Dodgers	4–3						40–35	
76	June 29		Dodgers	0–2						40–36	
77	June 30		@ Mets	6–12						40–37	

July: 16–12 (Home: 6–5; Away: 10–7)

#	Date	Time (CT)	Opponent	Score	Win	Loss	Save	Time of Game	Attendance	Record	Box/ Streak
78	July 1		@ Mets	2–3						40–38	
79	July 1		@ Mets	6–5 (13)						41–38	
80	July 2		@ Mets	2–7						41–39	
81	July 3		@ Mets	0–5						41–40	
82	July 4		Expos	4–7						41–41	
83	July 5		Expos	3–4 (11)						41–42	
84	July 6		Expos	2–4						41–43	
85	July 8		Mets	4–2						42–43	
86	July 9		Mets	6–3						43–43	
87	July 10		Mets	6–5						44–43	
88	July 14		@ Phillies	7–5						45–43	
89	July 15		@ Phillies	5–2						46–43	
90	July 16		@ Phillies	6–10						46–44	
91	July 17		@ Phillies	4–10						46–45	
92	July 18		@ Expos	6–1						47–45	
93	July 19		@ Expos	4–3						48–45	
94	July 20		@ Expos	3–2						49–45	
95	July 21		Phillies	2–0						50–45	
96	July 22		Phillies	5–3						51–45	
97	July 23		Phillies	7–6						52–45	
98	July 24		Phillies	4–6						52–46	
99	July 26		@ Padres	1–5						52–47	
100	July 27		@ Padres	4–1						53–47	
101	July 28		@ Padres	3–2						54–47	
102	July 29		@ Dodgers	3–1						55–47	
103	July 30		@ Dodgers	14–6						56–47	
104	July 31		@ Dodgers	1–6						56–48	

August: 15–14 (Home: 9–8; Away: 6–6)

#	Date	Time (CT)	Opponent	Score	Win	Loss	Save	Time of Game	Attendance	Record	Box/ Streak
105	August 1		@ Giants	1–4						56–49	
106	August 2		@ Giants	13–10						57–49	
107	August 3		@ Giants	3–2						58–49	
108	August 5		Dodgers	6–4						59–49	
109	August 6		Dodgers	3–5						59–50	
110	August 7		Dodgers	4–2						60–50	
111	August 8		Dodgers	10–0						61–50	
112	August 9		Giants	3–2						62–50	
113	August 10		Giants	0–5						62–51	
114	August 11		Giants	0–6						62–52	
115	August 12		Padres	3–4						62–53	
116	August 13		Padres	1–0						63–53	
117	August 14		Padres	1–6						63–54	
118	August 15		Padres	7–3						64–54	
119	August 16		@ Cardinals	0–3						64–55	
120	August 17		@ Cardinals	1–0						65–55	
121	August 18		@ Cardinals	1–2						65–56	
122	August 19		@ Pirates	5–1						66–56	W1
123	August 20		@ Pirates	1–2						66–57	L1
124	August 21		@ Pirates	2–1 (11)						67–57	W1
125	August 22		@ Cubs	9–7 (10)						68–57	
126	August 23		@ Cubs	3–9						68–58	
127	August 24		@ Cubs	2–3						68–59	
128	August 26		Pirates	2–0						69–59	W1
129	August 27		Pirates	3–1						70–59	W2
130	August 28		Pirates	3–4						70–60	L1
131	August 29		Cubs	1–2 (11)						70–61	
132	August 30		Cubs	7–4						71–61	
133	August 31		Cubs	1–3						71–62	

September: 11–16 (Home: 5–8; Away: 6–8)

#	Date	Time (CT)	Opponent	Score	Win	Loss	Save	Time of Game	Attendance	Record	Box/ Streak
134	September 2		Cardinals	0–2						71–63	
135	September 3		Cardinals	10–1						72–63	
136	September 4		Cardinals	4–3						73–63	
137	September 5		Reds	3–0						74–63	
138	September 6		Reds	3–10						74–64	
139	September 7		@ Dodgers	1–4						74–65	
140	September 8		@ Dodgers	2–1						75–65	
141	September 9		@ Giants	4–3 (12)						76–65	
142	September 10		@ Giants	2–3						76–66	
143	September 11		@ Giants	4–1						77–66	
144	September 13		@ Reds	2–5						77–67	
145	September 14		@ Reds	7–1						78–67	
146	September 15		@ Reds	5–7						78–68	
147	September 16		Giants	4–5						78–69	
148	September 17		Giants	2–4						78–70	
149	September 18		Giants	3–10						78–71	
150	September 19		Dodgers	0–1						78–72	
151	September 20		Dodgers	0–6						78–73	
152	September 21		Braves	1–0						79–73	
153	September 22		Braves	3–2						80–73	
154	September 23		@ Padres	3–4 (12)						80–74	
155	September 24		@ Padres	0–3						80–75	
156	September 25		@ Padres	1–9						80–76	
157	September 27		@ Braves	3–2 (10)						81–76	
158	September 28		@ Braves	3–4 (17)						81–77	
159	September 29		@ Braves	5–4						82–77	
160	September 30		Padres	1–5						82–78	

October: 0–2 (Home: 0–2; Away: 0–0)

#	Date	Time (CT)	Opponent	Score	Win	Loss	Save	Time of Game	Attendance	Record	Box/ Streak
161	October 1		Padres	3–6						82–79	
162	October 2		Padres	1–5						82–80	

=== Detailed records ===
National League
Opponent	W	L	WP	RS	RA
NL East
Chicago Cubs	5	7	0.417	51	51
Montreal Expos	6	6	0.500	49	44
New York Mets	5	7	0.417	48	66
Philadelphia Phillies	8	4	0.667	51	52
Pittsburgh Pirates	8	4	0.667	42	24
St. Louis Cardinals	6	6	0.500	41	38
Div Total	38	34	0.528	282	275
NL West
Atlanta Braves	13	5	0.722	87	60
Cincinnati Reds	9	9	0.500	82	72
**Houston Astros**					
Los Angeles Dodgers	9	9	0.500	66	66
San Diego Padres	6	12	0.333	41	67
San Francisco Giants	7	11	0.389	59	91
Div Total	44	46	0.489	335	356
Season Total	82	80	0.506	617	631

Month	Games	Won	Lost	Win %	RS	RA
April
May
June
July
August
September
October
Total

	Games	Won	Lost	Win %	RS	RA
Home
Away
Total

== Player statistics ==
Table legend
League leader	Team leader	*	Left-handed batter or pitcher
League top ten	Leader in appearances at position	#	Switch hitter

=== Batting ===
Abbreviations key

- Pos. – primary position
- G — games played
- AB — at bats
- H — hits
- HR — home runs
- RBI — runs batted in
- AVG — batting average

==== Starters by position ====
Individual batting results
Pos	Player	G	AB	H	Avg.	HR	RBI
C	Alan Ashby^{#}	73	227	54	.238	7	33
1B	Glenn Davis	152	561	152	.271	30	99
2B	Bill Doran^{#}	132	480	119	.248	7	53
3B	Buddy Bell	74	269	68	.253	7	37
SS	Rafael Ramírez	155	566	156	.276	6	59
LF	Billy Hatcher	145	530	142	.268	7	52
CF	Gerald Young^{#}	149	576	148	.257	0	37
RF	Kevin Bass^{#}	157	541	138	.255	14	72

==== Other batters ====
Individual batting results
Player	G	AB	H	Avg.	HR	RBI
Terry Puhl*	113	234	71	.303	3	19
Alex Treviño	78	193	48	.249	2	13
Denny Walling*	65	176	43	.244	1	20
Craig Reynolds*	78	161	41	.255	1	14
Jim Pankovits	68	140	31	.221	2	12
Craig Biggio	50	123	26	.211	3	5
Chuck Jackson	46	83	19	.229	1	8
Ken Caminiti^{#}	30	83	15	.181	1	7
Steve Henderson	42	46	10	.217	0	5
Louie Meadows*	35	42	8	.190	2	3
Casey Candaele^{#}	21	31	5	.161	0	1
John Fishel	19	26	6	.231	1	2
Mark Bailey^{#}	8	23	3	.130	0	0
Cameron Drew*	7	16	3	.188	0	1
Harry Spilman*	7	5	0	.000	0	0
Craig Smajstrla^{#}	8	3	0	.000	0	0

=== Pitching ===
Abbreviations key

- W — wins
- L — losses
- ERA — earned run average
- G — games pitched
- SV — saves
- IP — innings pitched
- SO — strikeouts

==== Starting pitchers ====
Individual pitching results
Player	G	IP	W	L	ERA	SO
Nolan Ryan	33	220.0	12	11	3.52	228
Mike Scott	32	218.2	14	8	2.92	190
Jim Deshaies*	31	207.0	11	14	3.00	127
Bob Knepper*	27	175.0	14	5	3.14	103
Bob Forsch	6	27.2	1	4	6.51	14

==== Other pitchers ====
Individual pitching results
Player	G	IP	W	L	ERA	SO
Danny Darwin	44	192.0	8	13	3.84	129
Joaquín Andújar	23	78.2	2	5	4.00	35

==== Relief pitchers ====
Individual pitching results
Player	G	W	L	SV	ERA	SO
Dave Smith	51	4	5	27	2.67	38
Juan Agosto*	75	10	2	4	2.26	33
Larry Andersen	53	2	4	5	2.94	66
Dave Meads*	22	3	1	0	3.18	27
Jeff Heathcock	17	0	5	0	5.81	12
Ernie Camacho	13	0	3	1	7.64	13
Rocky Childress	11	1	0	0	6.17	24
Brian Meyer	8	0	0	0	1.46	10

== Major League Baseball draft ==
Houston Astros 1988 MLB draft selections
Rd.	Slot	Draftee	Position	School	Origin	Signed	Notes	Bio
1	7	Willie Ainsley	Outfielder	North Garland HS	(Texas)	Y		
2	37	Mica Lewis	Shortstop	Cal State Los Angeles	(California)	Y		
2	52	Dave Silvestri	Shortstop	Missouri	(Missouri)	Y	(Note: Compensatory pick from the New York Yankees for signing free agent José Cruz.) (Note: MLB debut on April 27, 1992, with the New York Yankees)	
3	64	Scott Servais	Catcher	Creighton	(Wisconsin)	Y	(Note: MLB debut on July 12, 1991, for Houston)	
4	90	Luis Gonzalez	First baseman	South Alabama	(Florida)	Y	(Note: MLB debut on September 4, 1990, for Houston)	
17	428	Kenny Lofton	Outfielder	Arizona • 1988	(Indiana)	Y	(Note: MLB debut on September 14, 1991, for Houston)	

== Awards and achievements ==
=== Grand slams ===
No.	Date	Astros batter	Venue	Inning	Pitcher	Opposing team	Box
1	April 10	Kevin Bass (Note: Pinch hitter)	Riverfront Stadium	9	Pat Perry	Cincinnati Reds	
2	May 29	Rafael Ramírez (Note: 1st MLB grand slam)	Wrigley Field	6 (Note: Tied score or took lead)	Mike Capel	Chicago Cubs	
3	July 14	Buddy Bell	Veterans Stadium	1	Shane Rawley	Philadelphia Phillies	
4	August 2	Bill Doran	Candlestick Park	4	Randy Bockus	San Francisco Giants	

=== Pitching achievements ===
==== No-hit bids ====
Date	Starting pitcher (IP)	Relief pitcher(s) (IP)	No-hit IP	GS	Catcher	Batter	Final	Opponent	Box
April 27, 1988	Nolan Ryan (9)	—	8 1/3	84	Alan Ashby	Mike Schmidt	3–2	Philadelphia Phillies	
June 12, 1988	Mike Scott (9)	—	8 2/3	93	Alan Ashby	Ken Oberkfell	5–0	Atlanta Braves	
Note: Includes those games started with 7 or more no-hit innings.

=== Awards ===
1988 Houston Astros award winners
Name of award		Recipient	Ref.
Fred Hartman Award for Long and Meritorious Service to Baseball		Jim "Doc" Ewell	
Houston-Area Major League Player of the Year	CLE	Greg Swindell	
Houston Astros Most Valuable Player (MVP)		Glenn Davis	
Lou Gehrig Memorial Award		Buddy Bell	
MLB All-Star Game	Reserve pitcher	Bob Knepper	
National League (NL) Player of the Week	May 22	Billy Hatcher	
National League (NL) Player of the Week	August 14	Mike Scott	

Other awards results

Name of award	Voting recipient(s) (Team)	Ref.
NL Most Valuable Player	1st—Gibson (LAD) • 8th—G. Davis (HOU)	

=== League leaders ===
==== Batting leaders ====
- Caught stealing: Gerald Young (27—led MLB)

==== Pitching leaders ====
- Strikeouts (SO or K): Nolan Ryan (228)
- Strikeouts per nine innings pitched (K/9): Nolan Ryan (9.3)

=== Milestones ===
==== Major League debuts ====
Player—Appeared at position

- Craig Biggio, catcher
Date and opponent

- June 26 vs SFG
Box

Also:

== Minor league system ==
Level	Team	League	Manager
AAA	Tucson Toros	Pacific Coast League	Bob Didier
AA	Columbus Astros	Southern League	Tom Wiedenbauer
A	Osceola Astros	Florida State League	Keith Bodie
A	Asheville Tourists	South Atlantic League	Gary Tuck and Jim Coveney
A-Short Season	Auburn Astros	New York–Penn League	Frank Cacciatore
Rookie	GCL Astros	Gulf Coast League	Julio Linares

== See also ==
- List of Major League Baseball annual strikeout leaders
- List of Major League Baseball individual streaks
- List of Major League Baseball titles leaders
- List of Major League Baseball wins records
