= 1988 San Diego Padres season =

1988 San Diego Padres
- League: National League
- Division: West
- Ballpark: Jack Murphy Stadium
- City: San Diego, California
- Record: 83–78 (.516)
- Divisional place: 3rd
- Owners: Joan Kroc
- General managers: Jack McKeon
- Managers: Larry Bowa, Jack McKeon
- Television: KUSI-TV; San Diego Cable Sports Network (Dave Campbell, Jerry Coleman, Bob Chandler, Ted Leitner)
- Radio: KFMB (AM) (Dave Campbell, Jerry Coleman); XEXX (Gustavo Lopez, Mario Thomas Zapiain, Eduardo Ortega)

The 1988 San Diego Padres season was the 20th season in franchise history. Tony Gwynn set a National League record by having the lowest batting average (.313) to win a batting title.

== Offseason ==
- December 8, 1987: Rodney McCray was drafted from the Padres by the Chicago White Sox in the 1987 minor league draft.
- February 12, 1988: Rich Gossage and Ray Hayward were traded by the Padres to the Chicago Cubs for Keith Moreland and Mike Brumley.

== Regular season ==
Team president Chub Feeney resigned after giving the finger to fans carrying a sign reading "SCRUB CHUB" on Fan Appreciation Night.

=== Season standings ===
NL West
Team	W	L	Pct.	GB	Home	Road
Los Angeles Dodgers	94	67	.584	—	45‍–‍36	49‍–‍31
Cincinnati Reds	87	74	.540	7	45‍–‍35	42‍–‍39
San Diego Padres	83	78	.516	11	47‍–‍34	36‍–‍44
San Francisco Giants	83	79	.512	11½	45‍–‍36	38‍–‍43
Houston Astros	82	80	.506	12½	44‍–‍37	38‍–‍43
Atlanta Braves	54	106	.338	39½	28‍–‍51	26‍–‍55

=== Record vs. opponents ===
1988 National League record Sources:
Team	ATL	CHC	CIN	HOU	LAD	MON	NYM	PHI	PIT	SD	SF	STL
Atlanta	—	5–7	5–13	5–13	4–14	4–8	4–8	6–6	5–5	8–10	5–13	3–9
Chicago	7–5	—	6–6	7–5	4–8–1	9–9	9–9	8–10	7–11	8–4	5–7	7–11
Cincinnati	13–5	6–6	—	9–9	7–11	5–7	4–7	9–3	7–5	10–8	11–7	6–6
Houston	13–5	5–7	9–9	—	9–9	6–6	5–7	8–4	8–4	6–12	7–11	6–6
Los Angeles	14–4	8–4–1	11–7	9–9	—	8–4	1–10	11–1	6–6	7–11	12–6	7–5
Montreal	8–4	9–9	7–5	6–6	4–8	—	6–12	9–9–1	8–10	4–8	7–5	13–5
New York	8–4	9–9	7–4	7–5	10–1	12–6	—	10–8	12–6	7–5	4–8	14–4
Philadelphia	6-6	10–8	3–9	4–8	1–11	9–9–1	8–10	—	7–11	4–7	7–5	6–12
Pittsburgh	5–5	11–7	5–7	4–8	6–6	10–8	6–12	11–7	—	8–4	8–4	11–7
San Diego	10–8	4–8	8–10	12–6	11–7	8–4	5–7	7–4	4–8	—	8–10	6–6
San Francisco	13–5	7–5	7–11	11–7	6–12	5–7	8–4	5–7	4–8	10–8	—	7–5
St. Louis	9–3	11–7	6–6	6–6	5–7	5–13	4–14	12–6	7–11	6–6	5–7	—

=== Notable transactions ===
- June 1, 1988: Andy Benes was drafted by the Padres in the first round of the 1988 Major League Baseball draft.
- June 8, 1988: Candy Sierra was traded by the Padres to the Cincinnati Reds for Dennis Rasmussen.

=== Roster ===
1988 San Diego Padres
Roster
Pitchers: 51 Greg Booker; 32 Keith Comstock; 48 Mark Davis; 55 Mark Grant; 46 Greg Harris; 40 Andy Hawkins; 45 Jimmy Jones; 52 Dave Leiper; 41 Lance McCullers; 37 Eric Nolte; 43 Dennis Rasmussen; 30 Eric Show; 53 Candy Sierra; 31 Ed Whitson	Catchers: 27 Mark Parent; 9 Benito Santiago; Infielders: 12 Roberto Alomar; 35 Chris Brown; 11 Tim Flannery; 8 John Kruk; 6,7 Keith Moreland; 25 Rob Nelson; 5 Randy Ready; 10 Bip Roberts; 1 Garry Templeton; 21 Dickie Thon	Outfielders: 28 Shawn Abner; 47 Randy Byers; 24 Jerald Clark; 19 Tony Gwynn; 22 Stan Jefferson; 23 Shane Mack; 14 Carmelo Martínez; 16 Marvell Wynne; Other batters: 17 Sandy Alomar Jr.	Manager: 10 Larry Bowa; 15 Jack McKeon; Coaches: 2 Sandy Alomar Sr. (Third Base); 36 Pat Dobson (Pitching); 26 Amos Otis (Hitting); 3 Greg Riddoch (Bench/First Base); 34 Denny Sommers (Bullpen)

== Player stats ==
=== Batting ===
==== Starters by position ====
Note: Pos = Position; G = Games played; AB = At bats; H = Hits; Avg. = Batting average; HR = Home runs; RBI = Runs batted in

Pos	Player	G	AB	H	Avg.	HR	RBI
C	Benito Santiago	139	492	122	.248	10	46
1B	Keith Moreland	143	511	131	.256	5	64
2B	Roberto Alomar	143	545	145	.266	9	41
SS	Garry Templeton	110	362	90	.249	3	36
3B	Chris Brown	80	247	58	.235	2	19
LF	Carmelo Martínez	121	365	86	.236	18	65
CF	Marvell Wynne	128	333	88	.264	11	42
RF	Tony Gwynn	133	521	163	.313	7	70

==== Other batters ====
Note: G = Games played; AB = At bats; H = Hits; Avg. = Batting average; HR = Home runs; RBI = Runs batted in

Player	G	AB	H	Avg.	HR	RBI
John Kruk	120	378	91	.241	9	44
Randy Ready	114	331	88	.266	7	39
Dickie Thon	95	258	68	.264	1	18
Tim Flannery	79	170	45	.265	0	19
Shane Mack	56	119	29	.244	0	12
Mark Parent	41	118	23	.195	6	15
Stan Jefferson	49	111	16	.144	1	4
Shawn Abner	37	83	15	.181	2	5
Rob Nelson	7	21	4	.190	1	3
Jerald Clark	6	15	3	.200	0	3
Randy Byers	11	10	2	.200	0	0
Bip Roberts	5	9	3	.333	0	0
Sandy Alomar Jr.	1	1	0	.000	0	0

=== Pitching ===
==== Starting pitchers ====
Note: G = Games pitched; IP = Innings pitched; W = Wins; L = Losses; ERA = Earned run average; SO = Strikeouts

Player	G	IP	W	L	ERA	SO
Eric Show	32	234.2	16	11	3.26	144
Andy Hawkins	33	218.0	14	11	3.35	91
Ed Whitson	34	205.0	13	11	3.77	118
Jimmy Jones	29	179.0	9	14	4.12	82
Dennis Rasmussen	20	148.1	14	4	2.55	85

==== Other pitchers ====
Note: G = Games pitched; IP = Innings pitched; W = Wins; L = Losses; ERA = Earned run average; SO = Strikeouts

Player	G	IP	W	L	ERA	SO
Mark Grant	33	97.2	2	8	3.69	61
Greg W. Harris	3	18.0	2	0	1.50	15

==== Relief pitchers ====
Note: G = Games pitched; W = Wins; L = Losses; SV = Saves; ERA = Earned run average; SO = Strikeouts

Player	G	W	L	SV	ERA	SO
Mark Davis	62	5	10	28	2.01	102
Lance McCullers	60	3	6	10	2.49	81
Dave Leiper	35	3	0	1	2.17	33
Greg Booker	34	2	2	0	3.39	43
Candy Sierra	15	0	1	0	5.70	20
Keith Comstock	7	0	0	0	6.75	9
Eric Nolte	2	0	0	0	6.00	1

== Award winners ==
- Tony Gwynn, National League Batting Champion, .313

1988 Major League Baseball All-Star Game

== Farm system ==
Level	Team	League	Manager
AAA	Las Vegas Stars	Pacific Coast League	Steve Smith
AA	Wichita Pilots	Texas League	Pat Kelly
A	Riverside Red Wave	California League	Tony Torchia
A	Charleston Rainbows	South Atlantic League	Jack Krol
A-Short Season	Spokane Indians	Northwest League	Steve Lubratich
Rookie	AZL Padres	Arizona League	Jaime Moreno

LEAGUE CHAMPIONS: Las Vegas, Riverside, Spokane
