= List of Houston Astros team records =

The Houston Astros are a professional baseball team based in Houston, Texas. They compete in the Western Division of Major League Baseball's (MLB) American League (AL). The Astros began play during the 1962 MLB season as an expansion team and were known as the Houston Colt .45s for their first three years of existence. They played in the National League prior to 2013. The team's list of records includes individual single-season records set by Astros players for both batting and pitching.

== Individual batting leaders ==
Colt .45s/Astros single-season batting records
Category	Record	Player	Yr.
Batting average	.368	Jeff Bagwell	1994
On-base percentage	.454	Jeff Bagwell	1999
Slugging percentage	.750	Jeff Bagwell	1994
On-base plus slugging percentage	1.201	Jeff Bagwell	1994
Games played	162	7 tied (Note: Jeff Bagwell (×4), Craig Biggio (×3), Enos Cabell (1978), Bill Doran (1987), Steve Finley (1992), Carlos Lee (2007), and George Springer (2016) all have achieved the total at least once, with Springer being the most recent in 2016.)	2016
Plate appearances	749	Craig Biggio	1999
At bats	660	Enos Cabell	1978
At bats	660	Jose Altuve	2014
Runs scored	152	Jeff Bagwell	2000
Hits	225	Jose Altuve	2014
Singles	168	Jose Altuve	2014
Doubles	56	Craig Biggio	1999
Triples	14	Roger Metzger	1973
Home runs	47	Jeff Bagwell	2000
Extra-base hits	94	Lance Berkman	2001
Total bases	363	Jeff Bagwell	2000
Runs batted in (RBI)	136	Lance Berkman	2006
Bases on balls	149	Jeff Bagwell	1999
Strikeouts	212	Chris Carter	2013
Stolen bases	65	Gerald Young	1988
Times on base	331	Jeff Bagwell	1999
Offensive winning percentage	.858	Jeff Bagwell	1994
Hits by pitch	34	Craig Biggio	1997
Sacrifice hits	34	Craig Reynolds	1979
Sacrifice flies	13	Ray Knight	1982
Sacrifice flies	13	Jeff Bagwell	1992
Sacrifice flies	13	Carlos Lee	2007
Intentional base on balls	33	Yordan Alvarez	2026
Double plays grounded into	32	Miguel Tejada	2008
Caught stealing	27	Gerald Young	1988
Stolen base percentage	100.0	Carlos Beltrán	2004
Power–speed number	36.0	Jeff Bagwell	1997
At bats per strikeout	25.9	Tommy Helms	1973
At bats per home run	10.3	Jeff Bagwell	1994
Ref:

Colt .45s/Astros career batting records
Category	Record	Player	First	Last	Ref.
Batting average	.331	Moisés Alou	1998	2001	
On-base percentage	.410	Lance Berkman	1999	2010	
Slugging percentage	.585	Moisés Alou	1998	2001	
On-base plus slugging percentage	.988	Moisés Alou	1998	2001	
Games played	2850	Craig Biggio	1988	2007	
Plate appearances	12504	Craig Biggio	1988	2007	
At bats	10876	Craig Biggio	1988	2007	
Runs scored	1844	Craig Biggio	1988	2007	
Hits	3060	Craig Biggio	1988	2007	
Singles	2046	Craig Biggio	1988	2007	
Doubles	665	Craig Biggio	1988	2007	
Triples	80	José Cruz	1975	1987	
Home runs	449	Jeff Bagwell	1991	2005	
Extra base hits	1014	Craig Biggio	1988	2007	
Total bases	4711	Craig Biggio	1988	2007	
Runs batted in (RBI)	1529	Jeff Bagwell	1991	2005	
Bases on balls	1401	Jeff Bagwell	1991	2005	
Strikeouts	1753	Craig Biggio	1988	2007	
Stolen bases	487	César Cedeño	1970	1981	
Times on base	4505	Craig Biggio	1988	2007	
Offensive winning percentage	.726	Moisés Alou	1998	2001	
Offensive winning percentage	.726	Lance Berkman	1999	2010	
Hits by pitch	285	Craig Biggio	1988	2007	
Sacrifice hits	101	Craig Biggio	1988	2007	
Sacrifice flies	102	Jeff Bagwell	1991	2005	
Intentional base on balls	155	Jeff Bagwell	1991	2005	
Double plays grounded into	221	Jeff Bagwell	1991	2005	
Caught stealing	149	César Cedeño	1970	1981	
Stolen base percentage	82.48	Michael Bourn	2008	2011	
Power–speed number	341.8	Craig Biggio	1988	2007	
At bats per strikeout	21.2	Bob Lillis	1962	1967	
At bats per home run	15.6	Chris Carter	2013	2015	
Also:					

== Individual pitching leaders ==
Colt .45s/Astros single-season pitching records
Category	Figure	Player	Yr.
Earned run average (ERA)	1.69	Nolan Ryan	1981
Wins	22	Mike Hampton	1999
Win–loss percentage	.846	Mike Hampton	1999
Walks plus hits per inning (WHIP)	0.803	Justin Verlander	2019
Hits per nine innings (H/9)	5.529	Justin Verlander	2019
Bases on balls per nine innings (BB/9)	1.209	Zack Greinke	2020
Strikeouts per nine innings (K/9)	13.818	Gerrit Cole	2019
Games played	83	Octavio Dotel	2002
Saves	44	Billy Wagner	2003
Saves	44	José Valverde	2008
Innings pitched	305 1/3	Larry Dierker	1969
Strikeouts	326	Gerrit Cole	2019
Games started	40	Jerry Reuss	1973
Complete games	20	Larry Dierker	1969
Shutouts	6	Dave Roberts	1973
Hits	271	Jerry Reuss	1973
Bases on balls	151	J. R. Richard	1976
Home runs allowed	48	José Lima	2000
Strikeout-to-walk ratio (K/BB)	7.838	Justin Verlander	2018
Home runs per nine innings (HR/9)	0.121	Nolan Ryan	1981
Losses	20	Turk Farrell	1962
Earned runs	145	José Lima	2000
Wild pitches	21	Joe Niekro	1985
Hits by pitch	16	Jack Billingham	1971
Hits by pitch	16	Darryl Kile	1996
Hits by pitch	16	Charlie Morton	2018
Batters faced	1,218	J. R. Richard	1976
Games finished	71	José Valverde	2008
Adjusted ERA+	226	Roger Clemens	2005
Fielding Independent Pitching (FIP)	2.16	Mike Scott	1986
Adjusted pitching wins	5.9	Roger Clemens	2005
Adjusted pitching runs	54	Roger Clemens	2005
Base-out runs saved (RE24)	58.81	Justin Verlander	2019
Win probability added	6.3	Larry Dierker	1969
Situational wins saved	6.5	Mike Scott	1986
Championship win probability added	8.2	Vern Ruhle	1980
Situational wins added	6.2	Mike Scott	1986

Colt .45s/Astros career pitching records
Category	Figure	Player	First	Last	Ref.
Earned run average (ERA)	2.40	Roger Clemens	2004	2006	
Wins	144	Joe Niekro	1975	1985	
Win–loss percentage	.723	Justin Verlander	2017	2024	
Walks plus hits per inning (WHIP)	0.918	Justin Verlander	2017	2024	
Hits per nine innings (H/9)	5.942	Billy Wagner	1995	2003	
Bases on balls per nine innings (BB/9)	1.722	Justin Verlander	2017	2024	
Strikeouts per nine innings (K/9)	12.385	Billy Wagner	1995	2003	
Games played	563	Dave Smith	1980	1990	
Saves	225	Billy Wagner	1995	2003	
Innings pitched	2,294 1/3	Larry Dierker	1964	1976	
Strikeouts	1,866	Nolan Ryan	1980	1988	
Games started	320	Larry Dierker	1964	1976	
Complete games	106	Larry Dierker	1964	1976	
Shutouts	25	Larry Dierker	1964	1976	
Hits	2,090	Larry Dierker	1964	1976	
Bases on balls	818	Joe Niekro	1975	1985	
Home runs allowed	177	Larry Dierker	1964	1976	
Strikeout-to-walk ratio (K/BB)	6.206	Justin Verlander	2017	2024	
Home runs per nine innings (HR/9)	0.331	Dave Smith	1980	1990	
Losses	117	Larry Dierker	1964	1976	
Earned runs	837	Larry Dierker	1964	1976	
Wild pitches	128	Joe Niekro	1975	1985	
Hits by pitch	72	Darryl Kile	1991	1997	
Batters faced	9,492	Larry Dierker	1964	1976	
Games finished	400	Dave Smith	1980	1990	
Adjusted ERA+	180	Roger Clemens	2004	2006	
Fielding Independent Pitching (FIP)	2.39	Mike Cuellar	1965	1968	
Adjusted pitching wins	23.8	Roy Oswalt	2001	2010	
Adjusted pitching runs	231	Roy Oswalt	2001	2010	
Base-out runs saved (RE24)	250.14	Roy Oswalt	2001	2010	
Win probability added	22.9	Roy Oswalt	2001	2010	
Situational wins saved	6.5	Roy Oswalt	2001	2010	
Championship win probability added	16.7	Billy Wagner	1995	2003	

== Single-game records ==
=== Batting ===
	Team		Individual		
Category	Figure	Date	Figure	Player name	Date
Runs	23	August 7, 2019	5	Multiple	
Hits	25	Multiple	6	Joe Morgan	July 8, 1965
Runs batted in			8	J. R. Towles	September 20, 2007
Runs batted in			8	Yuli Gurriel	August 7, 2019

--->

== See also ==
- Baseball statistics
- List of Major League Baseball career records
- List of Major League Baseball records considered unbreakable
- List of Major League Baseball single-game records
- List of Major League Baseball single-season records
