= List of Houston Astros first-round draft picks =

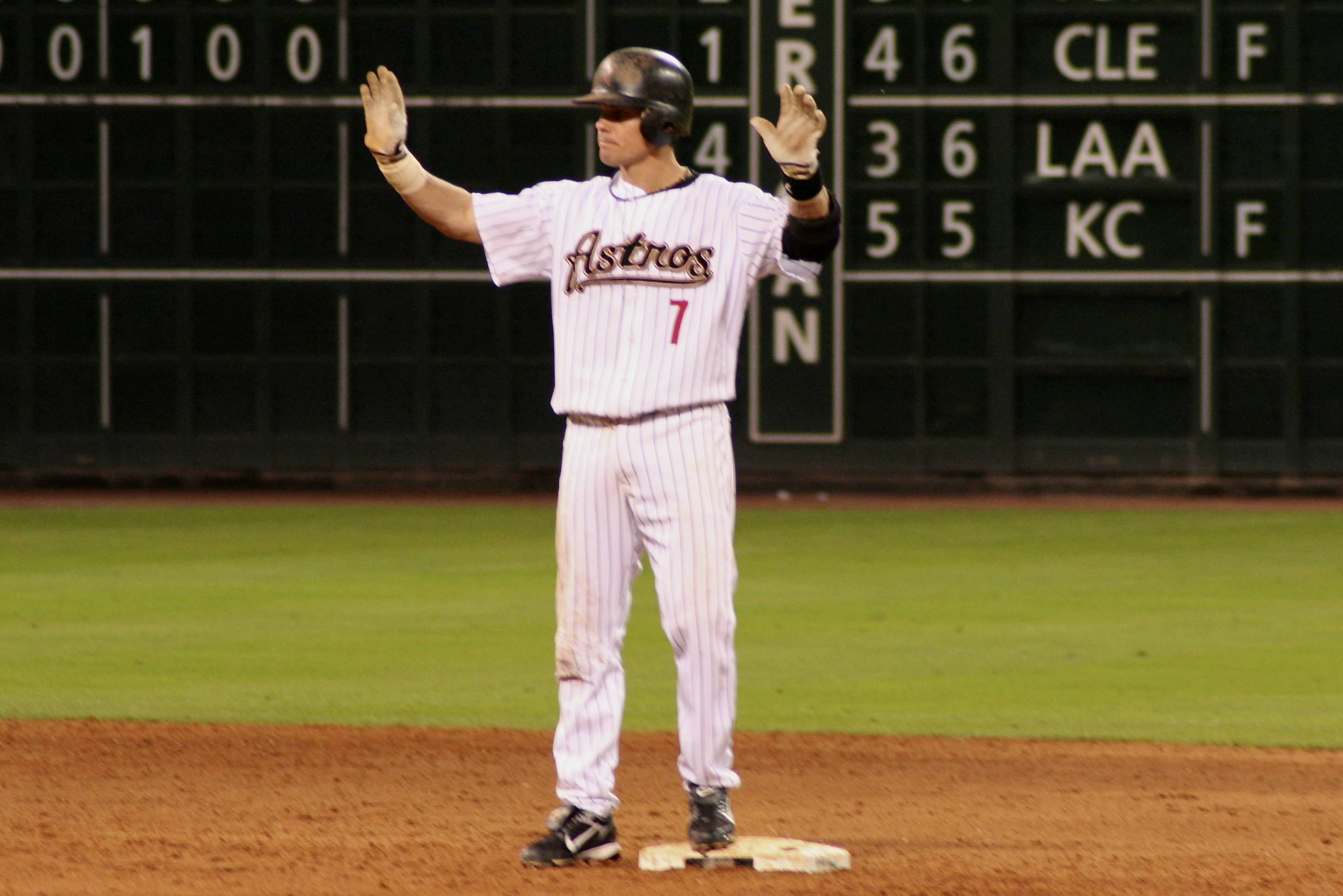
Craig Biggio (1987) is the only first-round draft pick of the Astros with over 3000 career hits.

The Houston Astros, originally called the "Colt .45s", are a Major League Baseball (MLB) franchise based in Houston, Texas. They play in the American League West division. Since the institution of Major League Baseball's Rule 4 Draft, the Astros have selected 57 players in the first round. Officially known as the "First-Year Player Draft", the Rule 4 Draft is Major League Baseball's primary mechanism for assigning amateur baseball players from high schools, colleges, and other amateur baseball clubs to its franchises. The draft order is determined based on the previous season's standings, and the team that had the worst record receives the first pick. In addition, teams which lost free agents in the previous off-season may be awarded compensatory or supplementary picks. The First-Year Player Draft is unrelated to the 1961 expansion draft in which the Astros initially filled their roster.

Of the 57 players picked in the first round by Houston, 24 have been pitchers, the most of any position; 21 of these were right-handed, while 3 were left-handed. Ten catchers were selected, while nine outfielders, nine shortstops, two first basemen, and two third basemen were taken as well. The team also selected one player at second base. Thirteen of the players came from high schools or universities in the state of California, while Texas and Tennessee follow with five and three players, respectively. They have also drafted two players from outside the United States: Carlos Correa (2012) and Ramón Castro (1994), both from Puerto Rico.

The Astros won their first World Series title in 2017 with three of their first-round picks on the World Series roster—Correa, series MVP George Springer (2011), and Alex Bregman (2015). One Astros first-round pick is a member of the Baseball Hall of Fame. Craig Biggio (1987), who played his entire 20-season MLB career (1988–2007) with the Astros and became a member of the 3,000 hit club, was elected to the Hall in 2015. Carlos Correa is the only Astros first-round pick to have won a Rookie of the Year award, joining Jeff Bagwell (1991, originally drafted by the Red Sox) as the two Astros to win ROY. No Astros first round pick has won a Most Valuable Player award or Cy Young Award with the team. Brad Lidge (1998) won the Comeback Player of the Year Award in 2008 with the Philadelphia Phillies, his first season after leaving the Astros.

The Astros have made 12 selections in the supplemental round of the draft. They have made the first overall selection in the draft five times; in 1976, 1992, 2012, 2013, and 2014. They have had 16 compensatory picks since the institution of the First-Year Player Draft in 1965. These additional picks are provided when a team loses a particularly valuable free agent in the prior off-season,^{[V]} or, more recently, if a team fails to sign a draft pick from the previous year. The Astros have failed to sign three of their first-round picks. First, pitcher Randy Scarbery (1970) did not sign though the Astros received no pick in compensation. John Burke (1991) and Brady Aiken (2014) also did not sign. The Astros were given the 37th pick of the 1992 draft and a pick in the 2015 draft in compensation for Burke and Aiken, respectively.

Year	Links to an article about that year's Major League Baseball draft
Position	Indicates the secondary/collegiate position at which the player was drafted, rather than the professional position the player may have gone on to play
Pick	Indicates the number of the pick
*	Player did not sign with the Astros
§	Indicates a supplemental pick
†	Member of the National Baseball Hall of Fame
'17	Player was a member of the Astros' 2017 championship team
'22	Player was a member of the Astros' 2022 championship team

== Picks ==
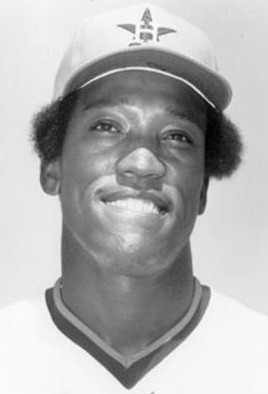
J. R. Richard was the first pitcher selected in the 1969 draft.

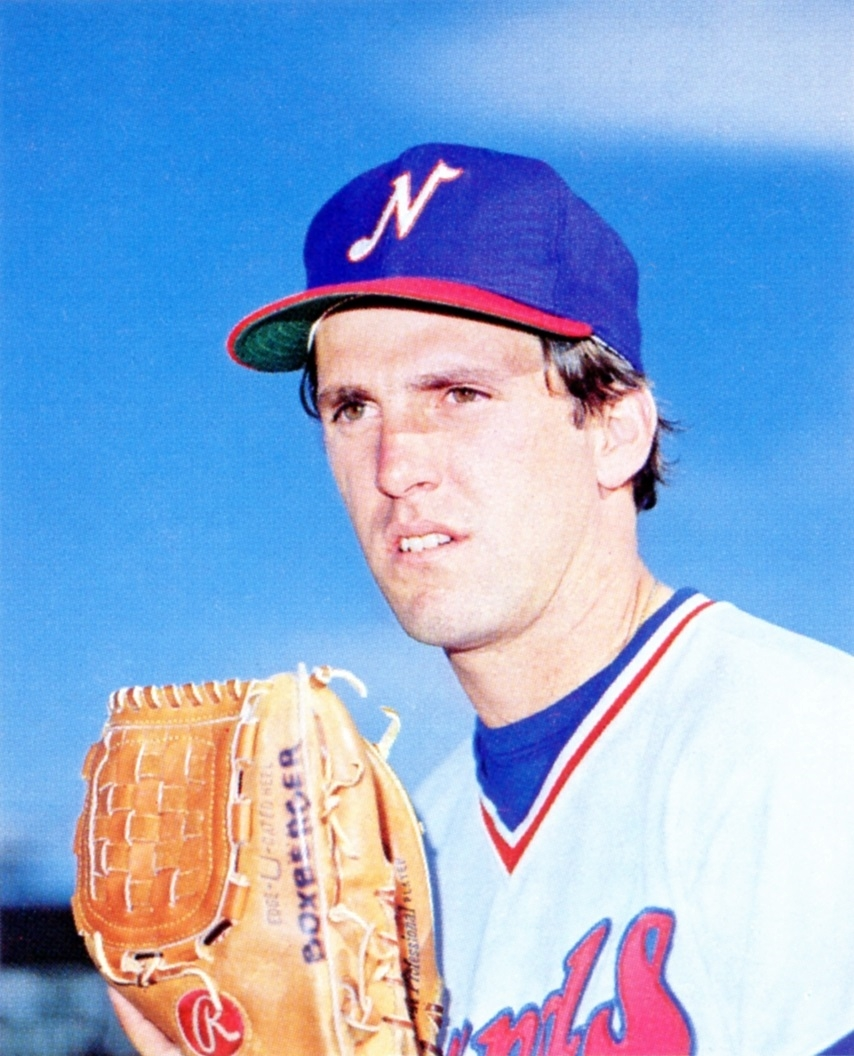
Rod Boxberger (1978) did not reach the major leagues.

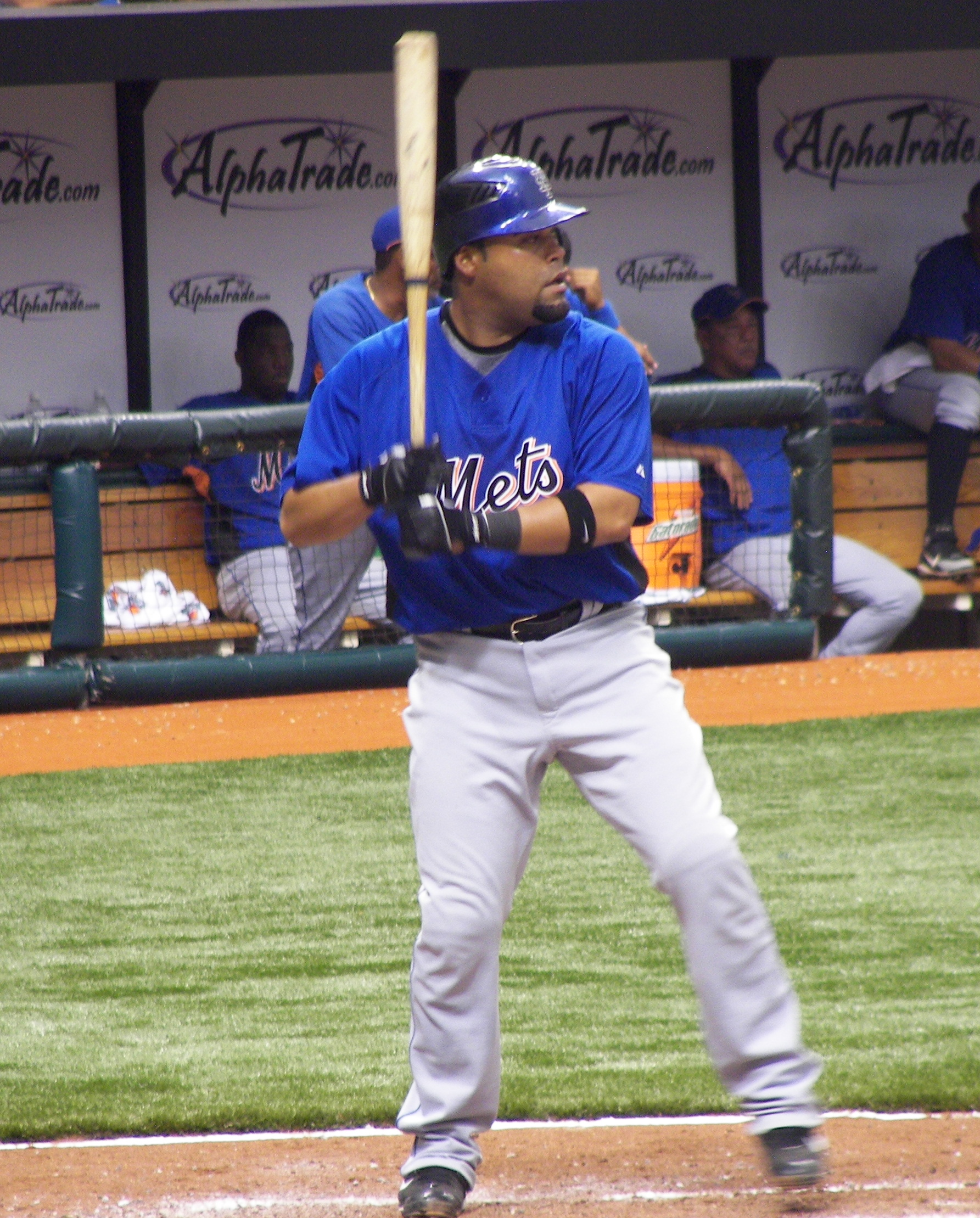
Ramón Castro (1994) was the first player ever selected in the first round of the draft from Puerto Rican by any team.

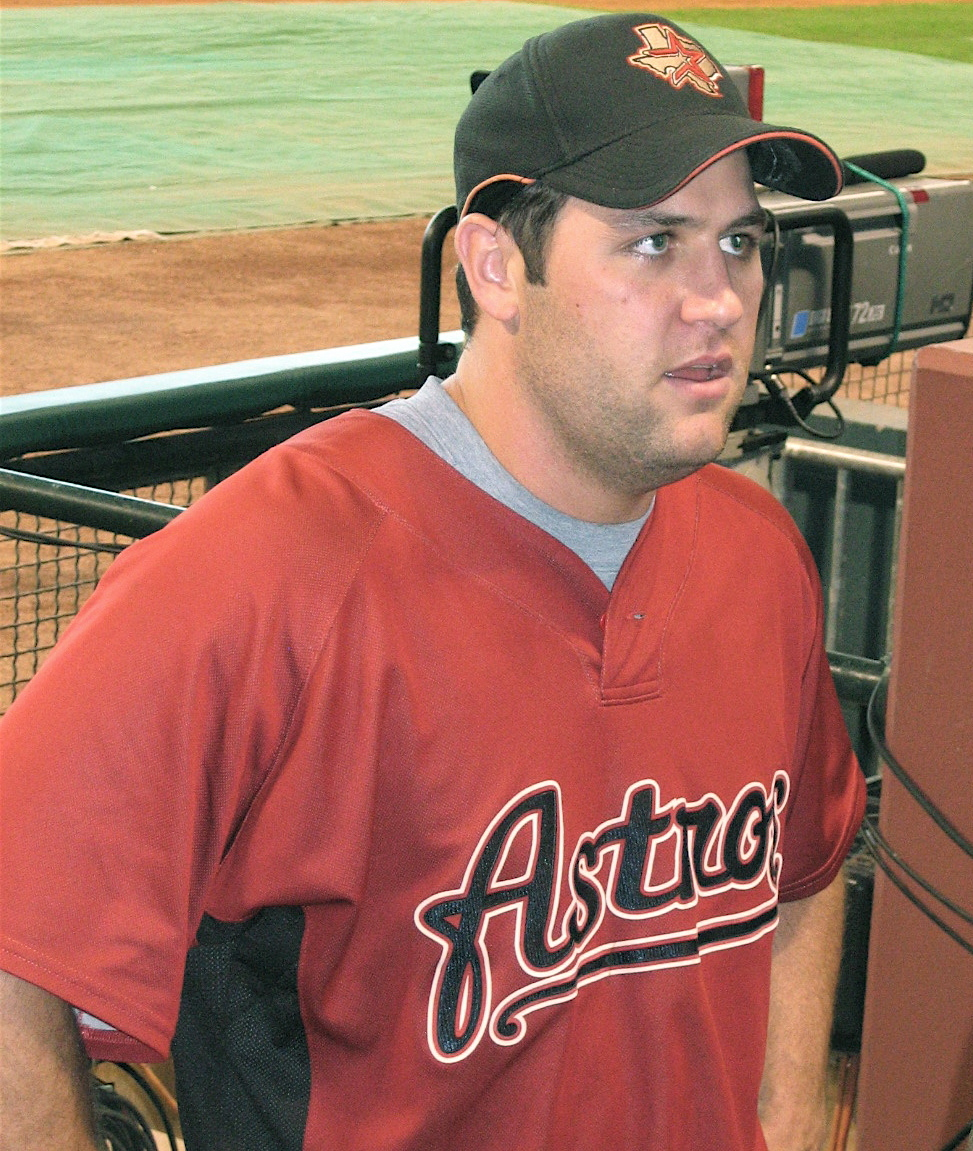
Lance Berkman (1997) is one of two players drafted from an institution based in the Astros' home city of Houston.

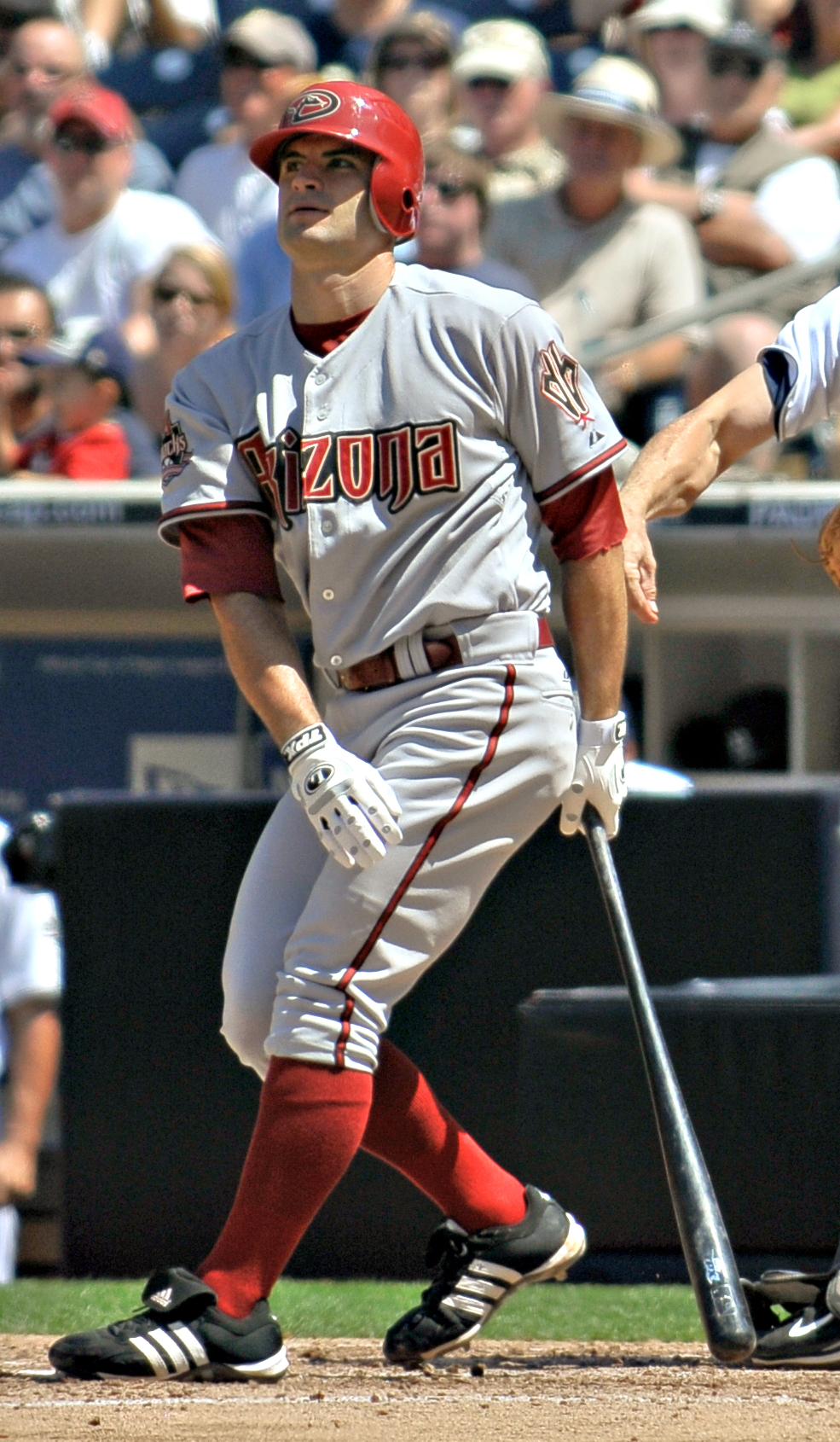
Chris Burke (2001) is the only second baseman taken by the Astros in the first round of the draft.

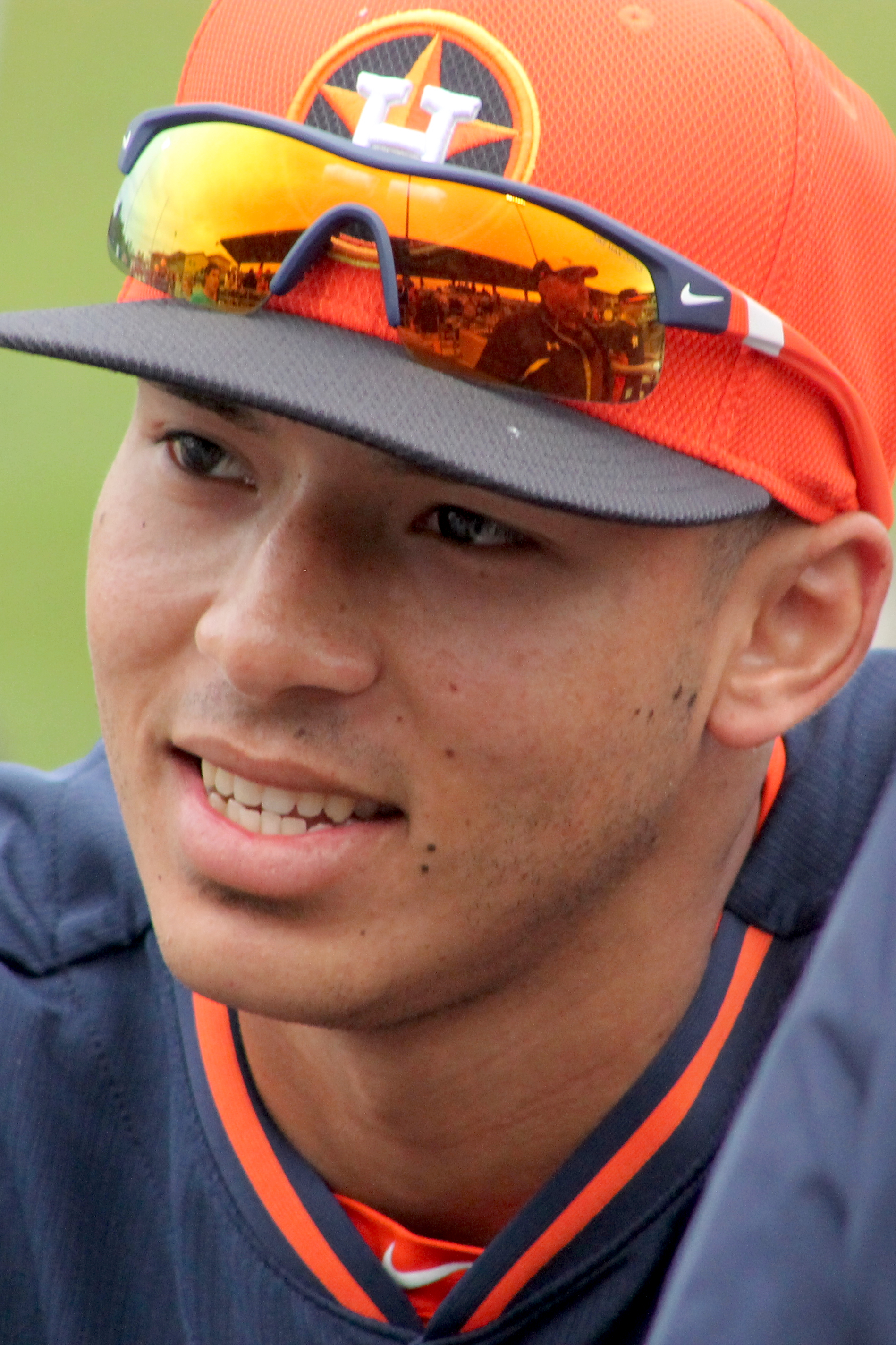
Carlos Correa (2012) was the first of three consecutive first overall picks by the Astros.

Year	Name	Position	School (Location)	Pick	Ref
1965	Alex Barrett	Shortstop	Atwater High School (Atwater, California)	4	
1966	Wayne Twitchell	Right-handed pitcher	Wilson High School (Portland, Oregon)	3	
1967	John Mayberry	First baseman	Northwestern High School (Detroit, Michigan)	6	
1968	Martin Cott	Catcher	Hutchinson Technical High School (Buffalo, New York)	3	
1969	J. R. Richard	Right-handed pitcher	Lincoln High School (Ruston, Louisiana)	2	
1970	Randy Scarbery*	Right-handed pitcher	Roosevelt High School (Fresno, California)	7	
1971	Neil Rasmussen	Shortstop	Arcadia High School (Arcadia, California)	12	
1972	Steve Englishbey	Outfielder	South Houston High School (South Houston, Texas)	9	
1973	Calvin Portley	Shortstop	Longview High School (Longview, Texas)	20	
1974	Kevin Drake	Outfielder	Cabrillo High School (Lompoc, California)	15	
1975	Bo McLaughlin	Right-handed pitcher	Lipscomb University (Nashville, Tennessee)	14	
1976	Floyd Bannister	Left-handed pitcher	Arizona State University (Tempe, Arizona)	1	
1977	Ricky Adams	Shortstop	Montclair High School (Montclair, California)	14	
1978	Rod Boxberger	Right-handed pitcher	University of Southern California (Los Angeles, California)	11	
1979	John Mizerock	Catcher	Punxsutawney High School (Punxsutawney, Pennsylvania)	8	
1980	no first-round pick^{[a]}				
1981	no first-round pick^{[b]}				
1982	Steve Swain	Outfielder	Grossmont High School (El Cajon, California)	15	
1983	Robbie Wine	Catcher	Oklahoma State University–Stillwater (Stillwater, Oklahoma)	8	
1984	Don August	Right-handed pitcher	Chapman University (Orange, California)	17	
1985	Cameron Drew	Outfielder	University of New Haven (West Haven, Connecticut)	12	
1986	Ryan Bowen	Right-handed pitcher	Hanford High School (Hanford, California)	13	
1987	Craig Biggio^{†}	Catcher	Seton Hall University (South Orange, New Jersey)	22	
1988	Willie Ansley	Outfielder	Plainview High School (Plainview, Texas)	7	
1989	Jeff Juden	Right-handed pitcher	Salem High School (Salem, Massachusetts)	12	
1989	Todd Jones	Right-handed pitcher	Jacksonville State University (Jacksonville, Alabama)	27^{§}^{[c]}	
1990	Tom Nevers	Shortstop	Edina High School (Edina, Minnesota)	21^{[d]}	
1990	Brian Williams	Right-handed pitcher	University of South Carolina (Columbia, South Carolina)	31^{§}^{[e]}	
1991	John Burke*	Right-handed pitcher	University of Florida (Gainesville, Florida)	6	
1991	Shawn Livsey	Shortstop	Simeon Career Academy (Chicago)	29^{§}^{[f]}	
1991	Jim Gonzalez	Catcher	East Hartford High School (East Hartford, Connecticut)	40^{§}^{[g]}	
1991	Mike Groppuso	Third baseman	Seton Hall University (South Orange, New Jersey)	44^{§}^{[h]}	
1992	Phil Nevin	Third baseman	California State University, Fullerton (Fullerton, California)	1	
1992	Kendall Rhine	Right-handed pitcher	University of Georgia (Athens, Georgia)	37^{§}^{[i]}	
1993	Billy Wagner^{†}	Left-handed pitcher	Ferrum College (Ferrum, Virginia)	12	
1994	Ramón Castro	Catcher	Lino Padron Rivera High School (Vega Baia, Puerto Rico)	17	
1994	Scott Elarton	Right-handed pitcher	Lamar High School (Lamar, Colorado)	25^{[j]}	
1994	Russ Johnson	Shortstop	Louisiana State University (Baton Rouge, Louisiana)	30^{§}^{[k]}	
1995	Tony McKnight	Right-handed pitcher	Arkansas High School (Texarkana, Arkansas)	22	
1996	Mark Johnson	Right-handed pitcher	University of Hawaiʻi at Mānoa (Honolulu, Hawaii)	19	
1997	Lance Berkman	First baseman	Rice University (Houston, Texas)	16	
1998	Brad Lidge	Right-handed pitcher	University of Notre Dame (Notre Dame, Indiana)	17^{[l]}	
1998	Mike Nannini	Right-handed pitcher	Green Valley High School (Henderson, Nevada)	37^{§}^{[m]}	
1999	Mike Rosamond	Outfielder	University of Mississippi (Oxford, Mississippi)	42^{§}^{[m]}	
2000	Robert Stiehl	Right-handed pitcher	El Camino College (Torrance, California)	27	
2001	Chris Burke	Second baseman	University of Tennessee (Knoxville, Tennessee)	10	
2002	Derick Grigsby	Right-handed pitcher	Northeast Texas Community College (Mount Pleasant, Texas)	29	
2003	no first-round pick^{[n]}				
2004	no first-round pick^{[o]}				
2005	Brian Bogusevic	Left-handed pitcher	Tulane University (New Orleans, Louisiana)	24	
2005	Eli Iorg	Outfielder	University of Tennessee (Knoxville, Tennessee)	38^{§}^{[p]}	
2006	Maxwell Sapp	Catcher	Bishop Moore High School (Orlando, Florida)	23	
2007	no first-round pick^{[r]}				
2008	Jason Castro '22	Catcher	Stanford University (Stanford, California)	10	
2008	Jordan Lyles	Right-handed pitcher	Hartsville High School (Hartsville, South Carolina)	38^{§}^{[s]}	
2009	Jiovanni Mier	Shortstop	Bonita High School (La Verne, California)	21	
2010	Delino DeShields Jr.	Outfielder	Woodward Academy (College Park, Georgia)	8	
2010	Mike Foltynewicz	Right-handed pitcher	Minooka High School (Minooka, Illinois)	19^{[t]}	
2010	Michael Kvasnicka	Catcher	University of Minnesota (Minneapolis, Minnesota)	33^{§}^{[u]}	
2011	George Springer '17	Outfielder	University of Connecticut (Storrs, Connecticut)	11	
2012	Carlos Correa '17	Shortstop	Puerto Rico Baseball Academy (Santa Isabel, Puerto Rico)	1	
2012	Lance McCullers Jr. '17 '22	Right-handed pitcher	Jesuit High School (Tampa, Florida)	41^{§}^{[v]}	
2013	Mark Appel	Right-handed pitcher	Stanford University (Palo Alto, California)	1	
2014	Brady Aiken*	Left-handed pitcher	Cathedral Catholic High School (San Diego, California)	1	
2015	Alex Bregman '17 '22	Shortstop	Louisiana State University (Baton Rouge, Louisiana)	2	
2015	Kyle Tucker '22	Outfielder	H.B. Plant High School (Tampa, Florida)	5^{§}	
2015	Daz Cameron	Outfielder	Eagle's Landing High School (McDonough, Georgia)	37^{§}	
2016	Forrest Whitley	Right-handed Pitcher	Alamo Heights High School (Alamo Heights, Texas)	17	
2017	J. B. Bukauskas	Right-handed Pitcher	University of North Carolina at Chapel Hill (Chapel Hill, North Carolina)	15	
2018	Seth Beer	Outfielder	Clemson University (Clemson, South Carolina)	28	
2019	Korey Lee '22	Catcher	University of California (Berkeley, California)	32	
2020	no first-round pick^{[w]}				
2021	no first-round pick^{[w]}				
2022	Drew Gilbert	Outfielder	University of Tennessee (Knoxville, Tennessee)	28	
2023	Brice Matthews	Shortstop	University of Nebraska (Lincoln, Nebraska)	28	
2024	Walker Janek	Catcher	Sam Houston State University (Huntsville, Texas)	28	
2025	Xavier Neyens	Shortstop	Mount Vernon High School (Mount Vernon, Washington)	21	
2026	Logan Hughes	Outfielder	Texas Tech University (Lubbock, Texas)	17	
2026	Jack Radel	Right-handed pitcher	University of Notre Dame (Notre Dame, Indiana)	28^{§}	

== See also ==
- Houston Astros minor league players

== Footnotes ==
- ^{V} Through the 2012 draft, free agents were evaluated by the Elias Sports Bureau and rated "Type A", "Type B", or not compensation-eligible. If a team offered arbitration to a player but that player refused and subsequently signed with another team, the original team was able to receive additional draft picks. If a "Type A" free agent left in this way, his previous team received a supplemental pick and a compensatory pick from the team with which he signed. If a "Type B" free agent left in this way, his previous team received only a supplemental pick. Since the 2013 draft, free agents are no longer classified by type; instead, compensatory picks are only awarded if the team offered its free agent a contract worth at least the average of the 125 current richest MLB contracts. However, if the free agent's last team acquired the player in a trade during the last year of his contract, it is ineligible to receive compensatory picks for that player.
- ^{a} The Astros lost their first-round pick in 1980 to the California Angels as compensation for signing free agent Nolan Ryan.
- ^{b} The Astros lost their first-round pick in 1981 to the Texas Rangers as compensation for signing free agent Dave Roberts.
- ^{c} The Astros gained a supplemental pick in 1989 for losing free agent Nolan Ryan.
- ^{d} The Astros gained a compensatory first-round pick in 1990 from the San Francisco Giants for losing free agent Kevin Bass.
- ^{e} The Astros gained a supplemental pick in 1990 for losing free agent Kevin Bass.
- ^{f} The Astros gained a supplemental pick in 1991 for losing free agent Danny Darwin.
- ^{g} The Astros gained a supplemental pick in 1991 for losing free agent Dave Smith.
- ^{h} The Astros gained a supplemental pick in 1991 for losing free agent Franklin Stubbs.
- ^{i} The Astros gained a supplemental pick in 1992 for failing to sign their 1991 first-round pick John Burke.
- ^{j} The Astros gained a compensatory first-round pick in 1994 from the San Francisco Giants for losing free agent Mark Portugal.
- ^{k} The Astros gained a supplemental pick in 1994 for losing free agent Mark Portugal.
- ^{l} The Astros gained a compensatory first-round pick in 1998 from the Colorado Rockies for losing free agent Darryl Kile.
- ^{m} The Astros gained a supplemental pick in 1998 for losing free agent Darryl Kile.
- ^{n} The Astros gained a supplemental pick in 1999 for losing free agent Randy Johnson.
- ^{o} The Astros lost their first-round pick in 2003 to the San Francisco Giants as compensation for signing free agent Jeff Kent.
- ^{p} The Astros lost their first-round pick in 2004 to the New York Yankees as compensation for signing free agent Andy Pettitte.
- ^{q} The Astros gained a supplemental pick in 2005 for losing free agent Carlos Beltrán.
- ^{r} The Astros lost their first-round pick in 2007 to the Texas Rangers as compensation for signing free agent Carlos Lee.
- ^{s} The Astros gained a supplemental pick in 2008 for losing free agent Trever Miller.
- ^{t} The Astros gained a compensatory first-round pick in 2010 from the Detroit Tigers for losing free agent José Valverde.
- ^{u} The Astros gained a supplemental pick in 2010 for losing free agent José Valverde.
- ^{v} The Astros gained a supplemental pick in 2012 for losing free agent Clint Barmes.
- ^{w} The Astros lost their first-round pick as punishment for their role in the sign stealing scandal.
