= Craig Smajstrla =

American baseball player (born 1962)

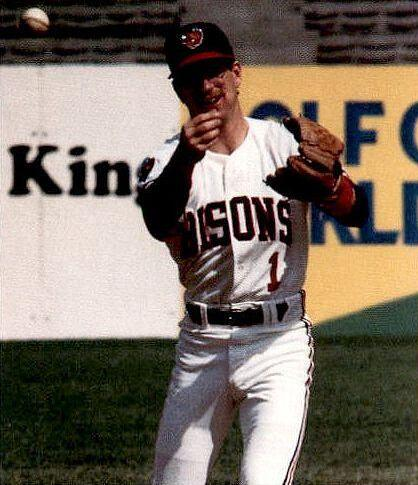
- Smajstrla with the Buffalo Bisons c. 1987
- Second baseman
- Born: June 19, 1962 (age 64); Houston, Texas, U.S.
- Batted: Both Threw: Right

MLB debut
- September 6, 1988, for the Houston Astros

Last MLB appearance
- September 27, 1988, for the Houston Astros

MLB statistics
- Games played: 8
- Runs scored: 2
- Stats at Baseball Reference

Teams
- Houston Astros (1988)

Craig Lee Smajstrla (pronounced: Suh-ma-struh-luh), (born June 19, 1962), is a former Major League Baseball player with the Houston Astros baseball club in 1988. A native of the Houston area, he only had three at-bats in his entire big league career and never recorded a hit or walk, but did reach base several times as a pinch runner. He tied a record set by many who have appeared in the Majors and yet never recorded a hit. His Astros record was broken in 1990 when Jeff Baldwin went 0 for 7 in his career. Smajstrla was nicknamed "Mr. Buy A Vowel" by Astros broadcaster Milo Hamilton. He was one of only three Houston natives on the '88 Astros roster (the others were Craig Reynolds and Steve Henderson). Smajstrla was also known for being one of the smallest players in baseball as he was only 5'9" tall and weighed 165 lbs.

== Game winning run ==
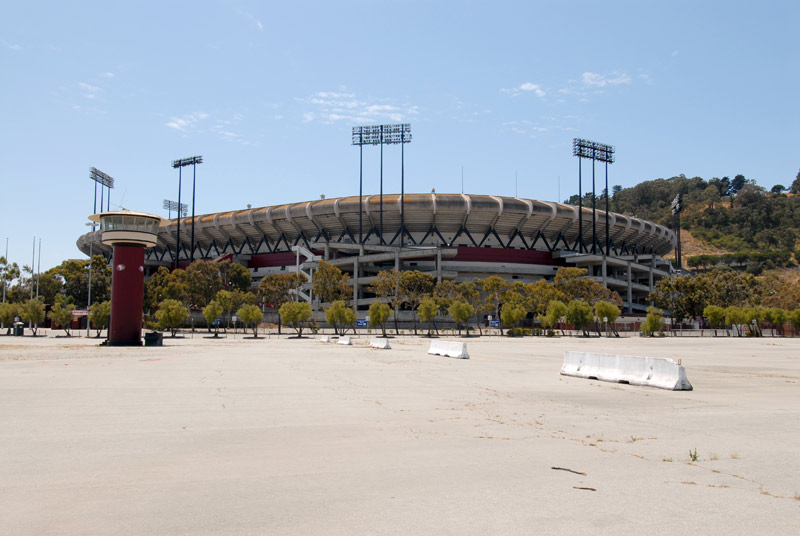
Candlestick Park, the site of Smajstrla's first run

Smajstrla scored the game-winning run on September 9, 1988 when he pinch-ran for Buddy Bell in the 11th inning of a game in Candlestick Park versus the San Francisco Giants. He scored one other run as a pinch runner later in that same month.

== Background ==
He was the Texas High School Baseball Player of the Year in 1980 for Pearland High School and was a 4th round pick by the Chicago White Sox in 1981.

In 1988 he hit .310 with 4 homers, 56 rbi, 28 steals, in 134 games as the Tucson Toros (the Astros Triple A affiliate) starting second baseman.

Smajstrla had hits in 25 straight games from July 30 to August 26, 1988. He was called to the Majors by the Astros on September 6, 1988 and grounded out versus Tom Browning of the Cincinnati Reds in his first big league at-bat on the same day.

He and his wife Denice currently live in Houston, Texas with their daughters Emily (18) and Lyndsi (15)

== Sources ==
- 1988 Houston Astros media guide.
- 1989 Houston Astros media guide.
