= Jim Pankovits =

American baseball player (born 1955)

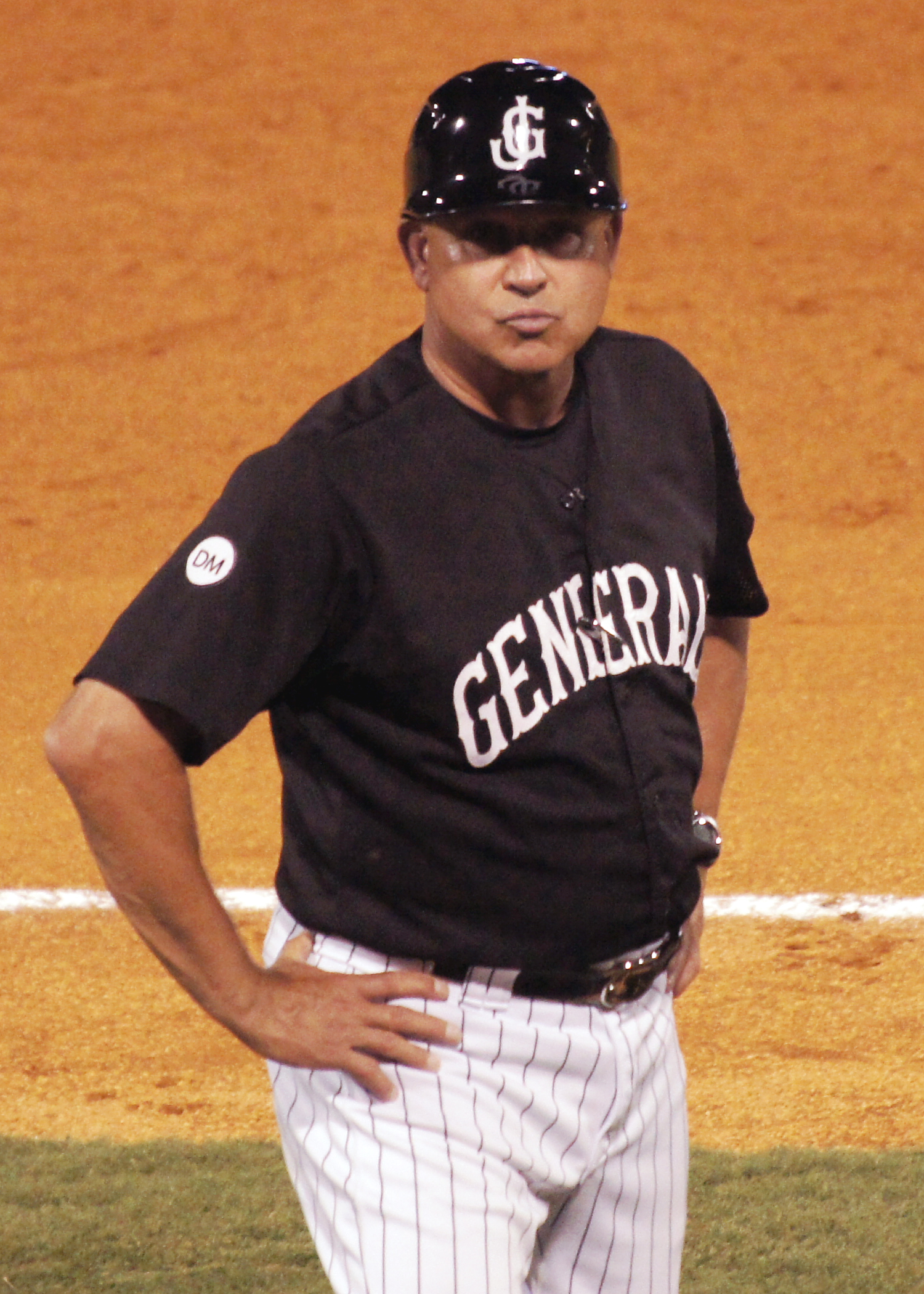
- Pankovits in 2012
- Infielder
- Born: August 6, 1955 (age 70); Pennington Gap, Virginia, U.S.
- Batted: Right Threw: Right

MLB debut
- May 27, 1984, for the Houston Astros

Last MLB appearance
- September 19, 1990, for the Boston Red Sox

MLB statistics
- Batting average: .250
- Home runs: 9
- Runs batted in: 55
- Stats at Baseball Reference

Teams
- Houston Astros (1984–1988); Boston Red Sox (1990)

James Franklin Pankovits (born August 6, 1955) is an American professional baseball coach, a former Major League Baseball infielder and minor league manager. In MLB, he appeared in 318 games played, 316 of them with the Houston Astros. Pankovits was a manager in the minor leagues for 17 years, most recently in 2019 with the Lynchburg Hillcats, the High-A affiliate of the Cleveland Indians.

== Professional career ==
The 5 ft 10 in (1.78 m), 170 lb (77 kg) Pankovits was selected by the Astros in the fourth round of the 1976 Major League Baseball draft from the University of South Carolina. During his six-year Major League career (1984–88; 1990), Pankovits was used primarily as a pinch hitter and occasional second baseman. In one instance, he even caught an inning of a 1986 game . In his career, he hit .250 with nine home runs and 55 RBI. His best season came in 1986 as a member of the National League West Division champion Astros, when he hit .283 in 70 games as the primary back up to Bill Doran.

Late in his playing career, Pankovits appeared in two games for the Boston Red Sox in September 1990 as defensive replacement—without logging a plate appearance—then began his managing career in the Red Sox' farm system in 1992. He returned to the Astro organization in 1995, serving through 2010 as a minor league manager at the Class A, Short Season-A and Double-A levels, and as a roving infield instructor. He then joined the Mariners' system in 2011 as manager of the Double-A Jackson, Tennessee, Generals of the Southern League. Coincidentally, he had managed a different franchise with the same name—the Jackson, Mississippi, Generals of the Double-A Texas League—in 1998–99 when it was an Astro affiliate.

After three seasons (2011–13) as Jackson's pilot, Pankovits assumed a position with the Mariners in 2014 as a roving minor league infield instructor. His career record as a minor-league manager is 938–1,010 (.482). As the 2018 manager of Mahoning Valley of the Short-season New York–Penn League, he is a member of the Cleveland Indians' organization.

== Youth and college baseball ==
Pankovits played in 1968 Little League World Series for the Tuckahoe Little League team from Richmond, Virginia, that was U.S. national champions and the LLWS runner-up. He also was a member of runner-up South Carolina Gamecocks during the 1975 College World Series.

== PANKOVITS—The System ==
In 2007, the Astros introduced a player analysis formula in his honor. The brain child of then-general manager Tim Purpura, PANKOVITS is an acronym for Player Analysis with Neutral Knowledge of Offensively Vital Information Tracking Statistics. It is credited in some circles with predicting the success of Hunter Pence and the failure of Woody Williams during the 2007 season.

Preceded by Gary Allenson	New Britain Red Sox manager 1992–1994	Succeeded by Sal Butera; Team renamed Hardware City Rock Cats
Preceded by Dave Engle	Jackson Generals (Texas League) manager 1998–1999	Succeeded by Franchise relocated
Preceded by Tim Laker; Team named West Tenn Diamond Jaxx	Jackson Generals (Southern League) manager 2011–2013	Succeeded by Jim Horner
