= Gerald Young (baseball) =

Honduran baseball player (born 1964)

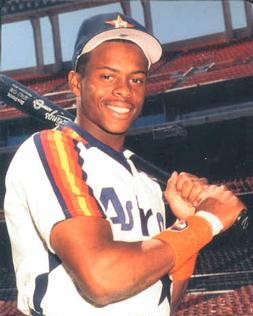
- Center fielder
- Born: October 22, 1964 (age 61); Tela, Honduras
- Batted: Switch Threw: Right

MLB debut
- July 8, 1987, for the Houston Astros

Last MLB appearance
- August 11, 1994, for the St. Louis Cardinals

MLB statistics
- Batting average: .246
- Home runs: 3
- Runs batted in: 113
- Stolen bases: 155
- Stats at Baseball Reference

Teams
- Houston Astros (1987–1992); Colorado Rockies (1993); St. Louis Cardinals (1994)

Gerald Anthony Young (born October 22, 1964) is a Honduran former professional baseball outfielder. He played all or parts of eight seasons in Major League Baseball (MLB), primarily as a center fielder. He is the first person born in Honduras to play Major League Baseball.

== Career ==
A 1982 graduate of Santa Ana Valley High School, Young was drafted in the 5th round of the 1982 MLB amateur draft by the New York Mets. He was, along with Rafael Palmeiro and Dwight Gooden, part of a draft class that set a major league record for a single team when 14 of those players reached the major leagues.

Traded by the Mets to the Houston Astros on September 1, 1984, for third baseman Ray Knight, Young made his major league debut with them on July 8, 1987. This made him the first Honduran to play for the Astros, and the only one until Mauricio Dubon joined the team in 2022. He showed promise by hitting .321 and stealing 26 bases for the Astros, finishing 5th in National League Rookie of the Year voting despite playing less than half a season with the major league club. Young's best season in the major leagues came the following year, 1988, when he finished 2nd in the NL with 65 steals. 1989 was a disappointment for Young offensively, although he finished 8th in the league in steals (34) and accomplished a rare defensive feat by recording 412 putouts with only one error and adding 15 outfield assists.

Young spent the next three seasons splitting time between the Astros, their Triple A affiliate the Tucson Toros, and the disabled list (with an assortment of injuries). Although he was successful at the minor league level, always hitting over .300, his batting statistics for the Astros never replicated his earlier success. At the end of the 1992 season, Young became a free agent.

Young became an inaugural member of the expansion Colorado Rockies in 1993. Young hit .340 in spring training, but the team acquired power-hitting outfielder Dale Murphy in the first week of the 1993 season. Young was limited to one hit in 19 at bats over two months. The team released him when he declined to be sent to the minor leagues. He was a free agent for a few weeks before landing with the Class AAA affiliate of the Cincinnati Reds and hitting .301, but he was released after 32 games. He finished the season with the Class AAA affiliate of the Seattle Mariners, hitting .298 for them in 25 games.

With the St. Louis Cardinals in 1994, Young hit .333 in spring training, and he thought he might make the major league team, but he started the season with Class AAA Louisville after Cardinals manager Joe Torre decided to keep four outfielders on the roster instead of the customary five outfielders. Young appeared in his final MLB game on August 11, 1994, playing for the Cardinals. He was released that October.

== Personal life ==
Gerald is married to Veronica; the couple have two children together.

== See also ==
- Houston Astros award winners and league leaders
- List of Houston Astros team records
- List of countries with their first Major League Baseball player
- List of Major League Baseball career stolen bases leaders
