= 1985 Major League Baseball draft =

Baseball draft of amateur players by Major League Baseball

General information
- Date: June 1985

Overview
- 832 total selections
- First selection: B. J. Surhoff; Milwaukee Brewers
- First round selections: 28
- Hall of Famers: 3: SS Barry Larkin; P Randy Johnson; P John Smoltz

The 1985 Major League Baseball draft took place in June 1985. The draft saw the Milwaukee Brewers select B. J. Surhoff first overall. Also picked in the first round were future stars Barry Bonds, Barry Larkin and Rafael Palmeiro.

== First-round draft picks ==
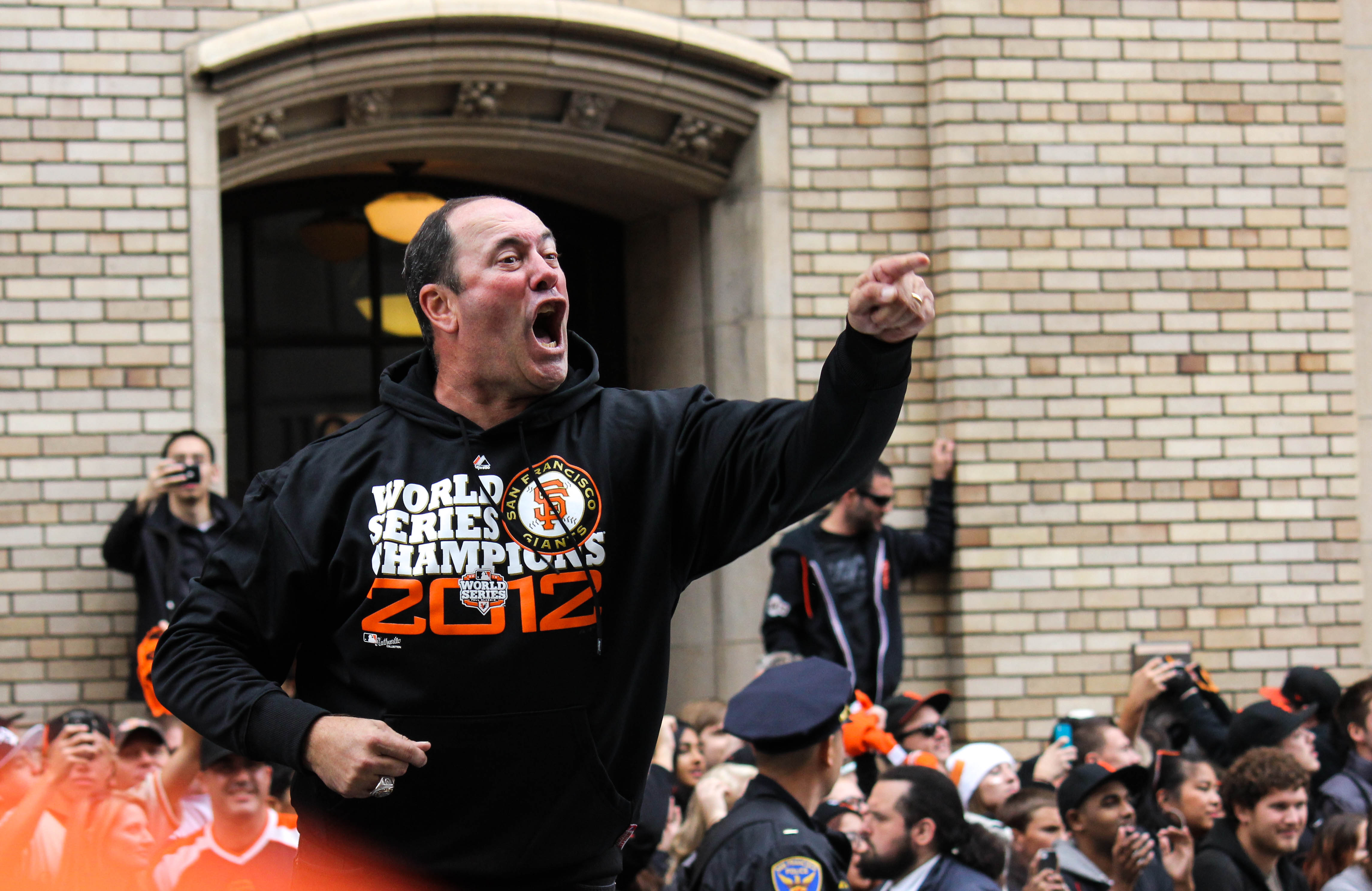
The San Francisco Giants selected Will Clark second overall. The 6x All-Star won the 1991 Gold Glove Award at first base, two Silver Slugger Awards at first base, and had his No 22 Retired by the Giants.

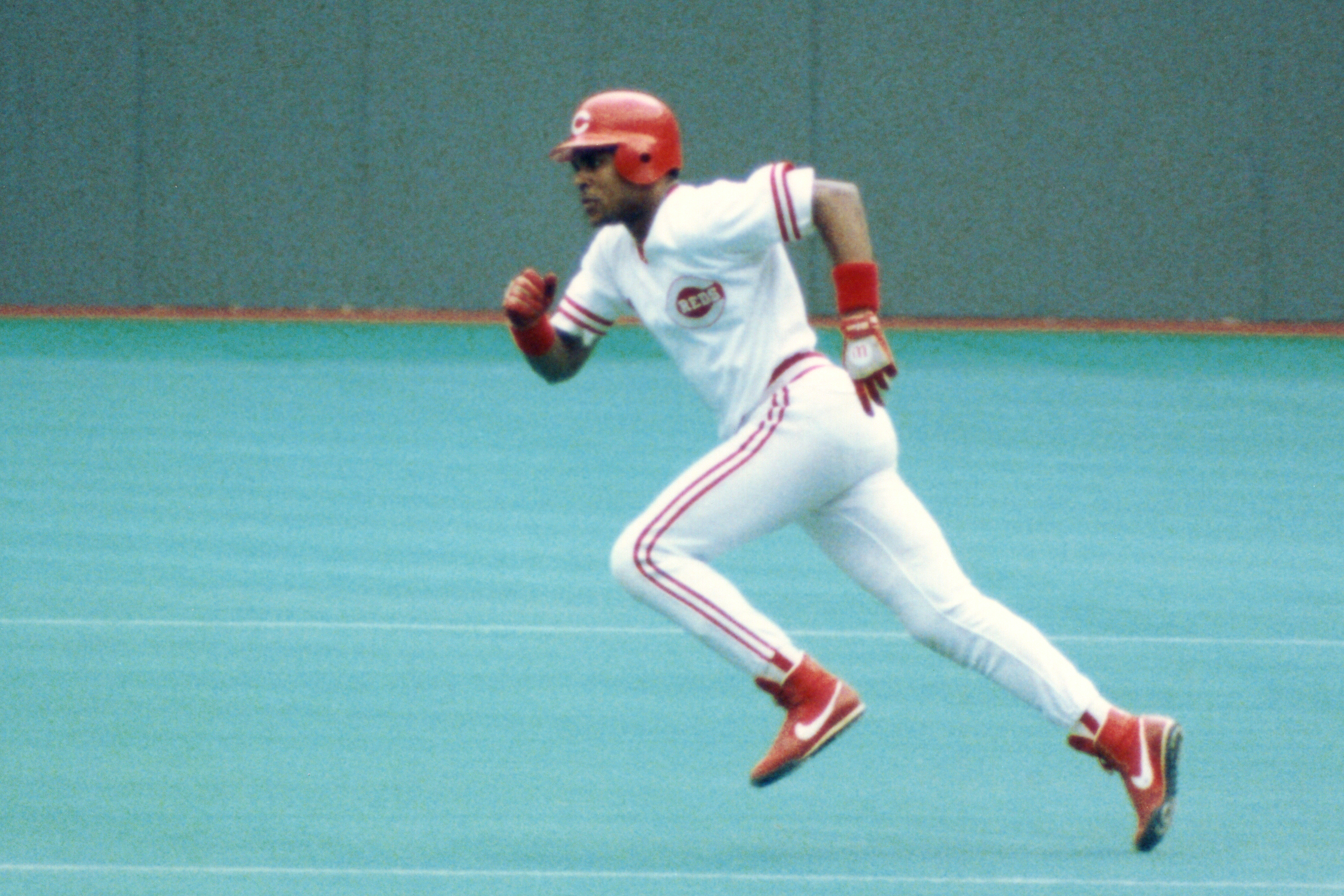
The Cincinnati Reds selected Barry Larkin fourth overall. Larkin is a 12x All-Star, 9x Silver Slugger at shortstop, 3x Gold Glove winner at shortstop, and the 1995 National League Most Valuable Player Award. The National Baseball Hall of Fame inducted Larkin as a member in 2012.

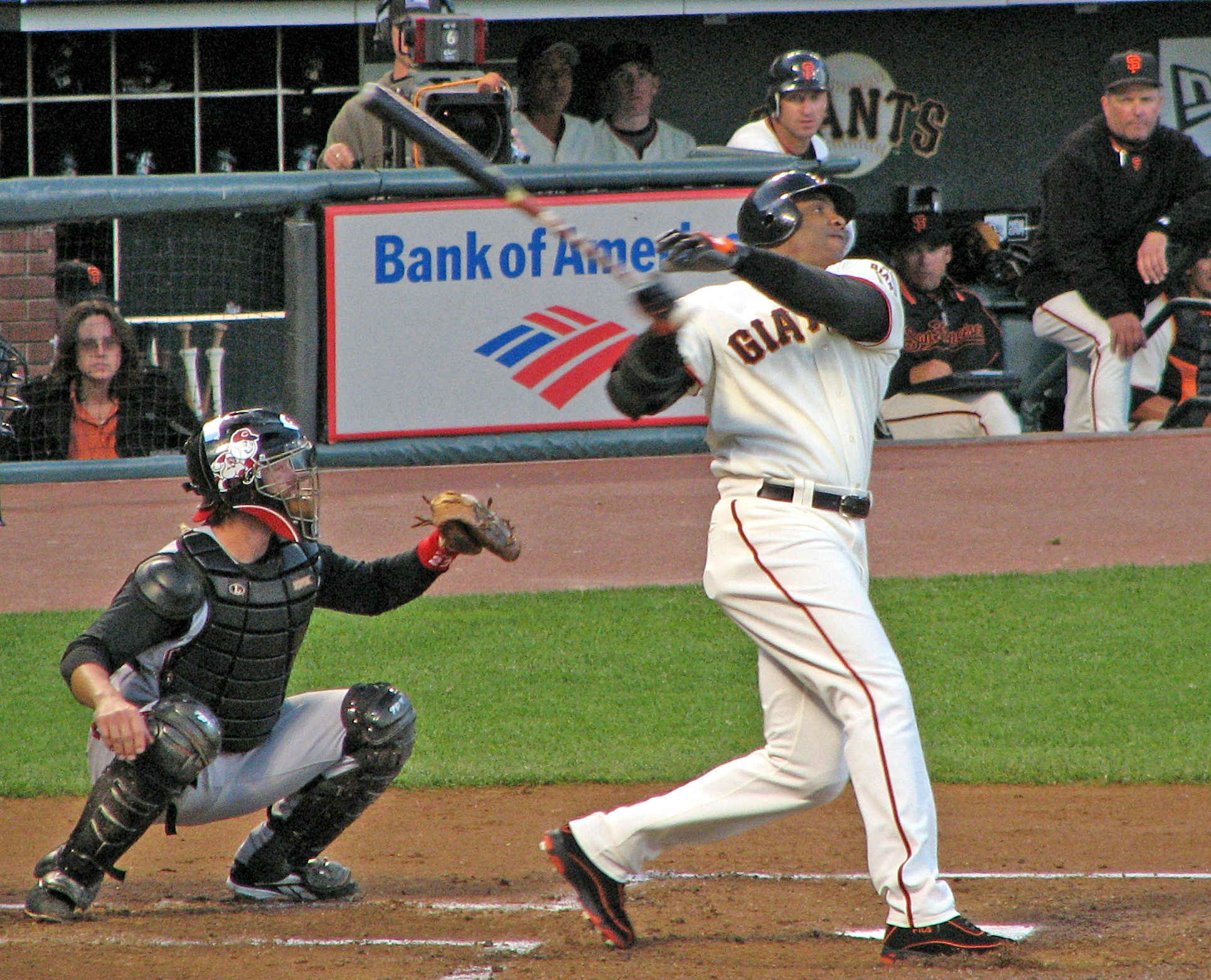
The Pittsburgh Pirates selected Barry Bonds sixth overall. Bonds is a 7x National League MVP, and the Single-season home run leader and all-time home run leader.

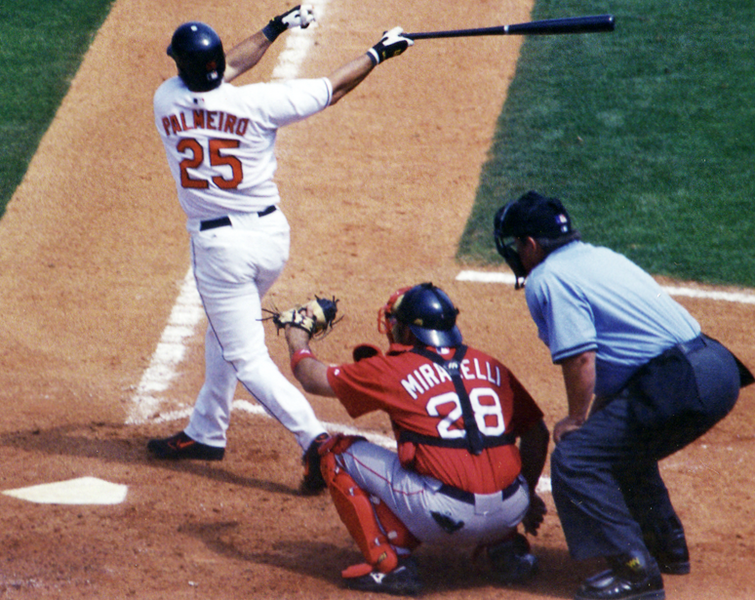
The Chicago Cubs selected Rafael Palmeiro 22nd overall. Palmeiro is a 4x All-Star, 3x Gold Glove winner at first base, 2x Silver Slugger (one at first base and one at DH), and a member of the 500 home run club.

The following are the first round picks in the 1985 Major League Baseball draft.

= All-Star	= Baseball Hall of Famer

Pick	Player	Team	Position	School
1	B.J. Surhoff	Milwaukee Brewers	C	North Carolina
2	Will Clark	San Francisco Giants	1B	Mississippi State
3	Bobby Witt	Texas Rangers	RHP	Oklahoma
4	Barry Larkin	Cincinnati Reds	SS	Michigan
5	Kurt Brown	Chicago White Sox	C	Glendora High School (CA)
6	Barry Bonds	Pittsburgh Pirates	OF	Arizona State
7	Mike Campbell	Seattle Mariners	RHP	Hawaii
8	Pete Incaviglia	Montreal Expos	OF	Oklahoma State
9	Mike Poehl	Cleveland Indians	RHP	Texas
10	Chris Gwynn	Los Angeles Dodgers	OF	San Diego State
11	Walt Weiss	Oakland Athletics	SS	North Carolina
12	Cameron Drew	Houston Astros	OF	University of New Haven
13	Jeff Bumgarner	Minnesota Twins	RHP	Hanford High School (WA)
14	Tommy Greene	Atlanta Braves	RHP	Whiteville High School (NC)
15	Willie Fraser	California Angels	RHP	Concordia College
16	Trey McCall	Philadelphia Phillies	C	Abingdon High School (VA)
17	Brian McRae	Kansas City Royals	SS	Manatee High School (FL)
18	Joe Magrane	St. Louis Cardinals	LHP	Arizona
19	Mike Cook	California Angels	RHP	South Carolina
20	Gregg Jefferies	New York Mets	SS	Junipero Serra High School (CA)
21	Dan Gabriele	Boston Red Sox	RHP	Western High School (MI)
22	Rafael Palmeiro	Chicago Cubs	OF	Mississippi State
23	Joey Cora	San Diego Padres	SS	Vanderbilt
24	Dave Masters	Chicago Cubs	RHP	California
25	Greg David	Toronto Blue Jays	OF	Barron Collier High School (FL)
26	Randy Nosek	Detroit Tigers	RHP	Chillicothe High School (MO)

== Supplemental first round selections ==
Pick	Player	Team	Position	Hometown/School
27	Bill McGuire	Seattle Mariners	C	Nebraska
28	Rick Balabon	New York Yankees	RHP	Berwyn, Pennsylvania

== Background ==
Six of the first eight draft picks from the June regular phase had at least one full year of major league experience prior to the start of the 1987 season. Included in that list were B.J. Surhoff (Milwaukee), the draft's number one pick, Will Clark (San Francisco), Bobby Witt (Texas), Barry Larkin (Cincinnati), Pete Incaviglia (Montreal) and Barry Bonds (Pittsburgh).

Incaviglia was selected eighth overall by the Expos, but was unable to reach a contract and was traded to Texas. He made his major league debut on Opening Day 1986 as the Rangers' left fielder, becoming just the 15th drafted player to go directly to the majors.

As of 2017, this year's draft class has accumulated the highest Baseball-Reference Wins Above Replacement total of any class in the draft's history.

== Other notable players ==
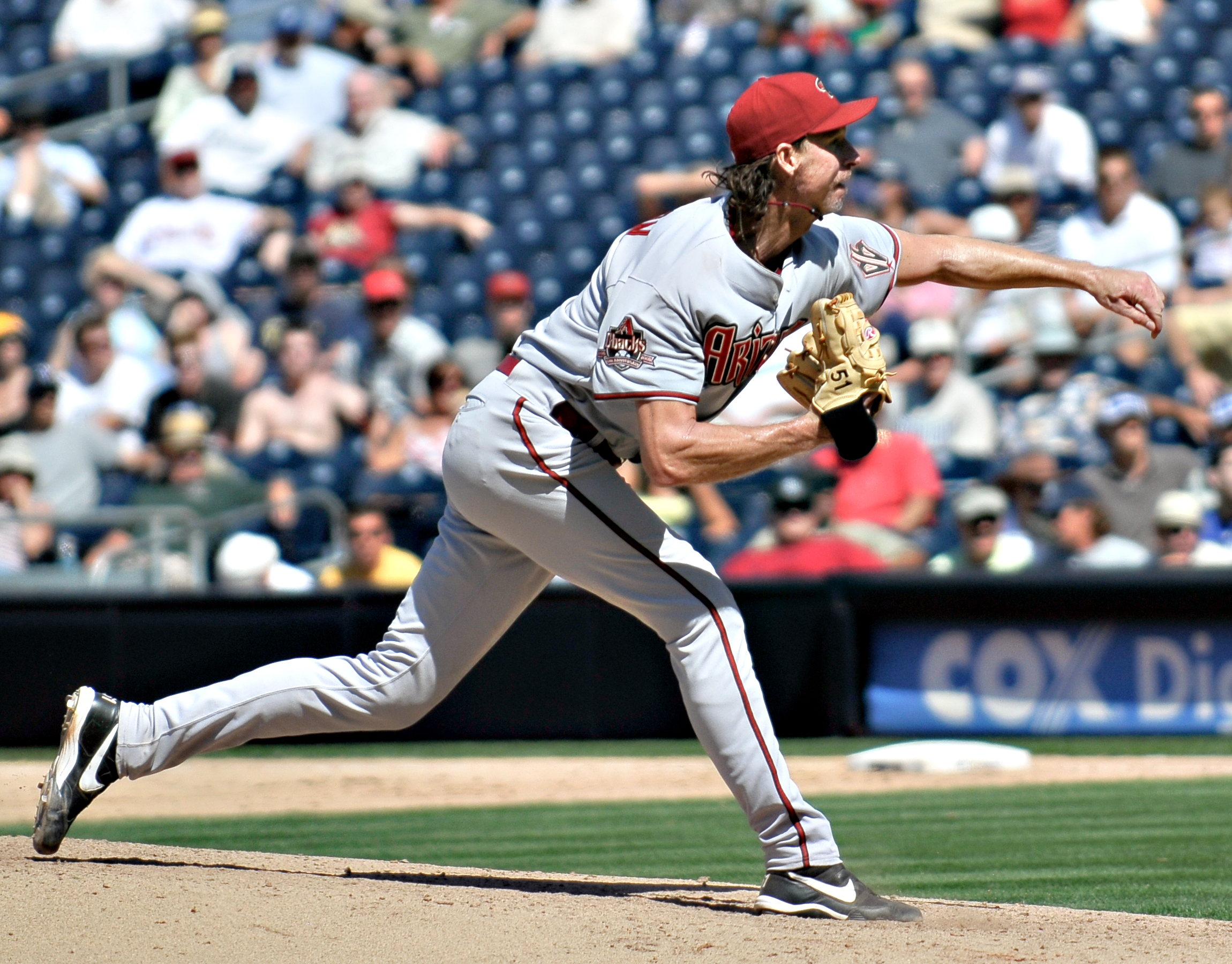
The Montreal Expos selected Randy Johnson in the second round. Johnson is a 5x Cy Young Award winner and finished his career second in all-time strikeouts. The National Baseball Hall of Fame inducted Johnson as a member in 2015.

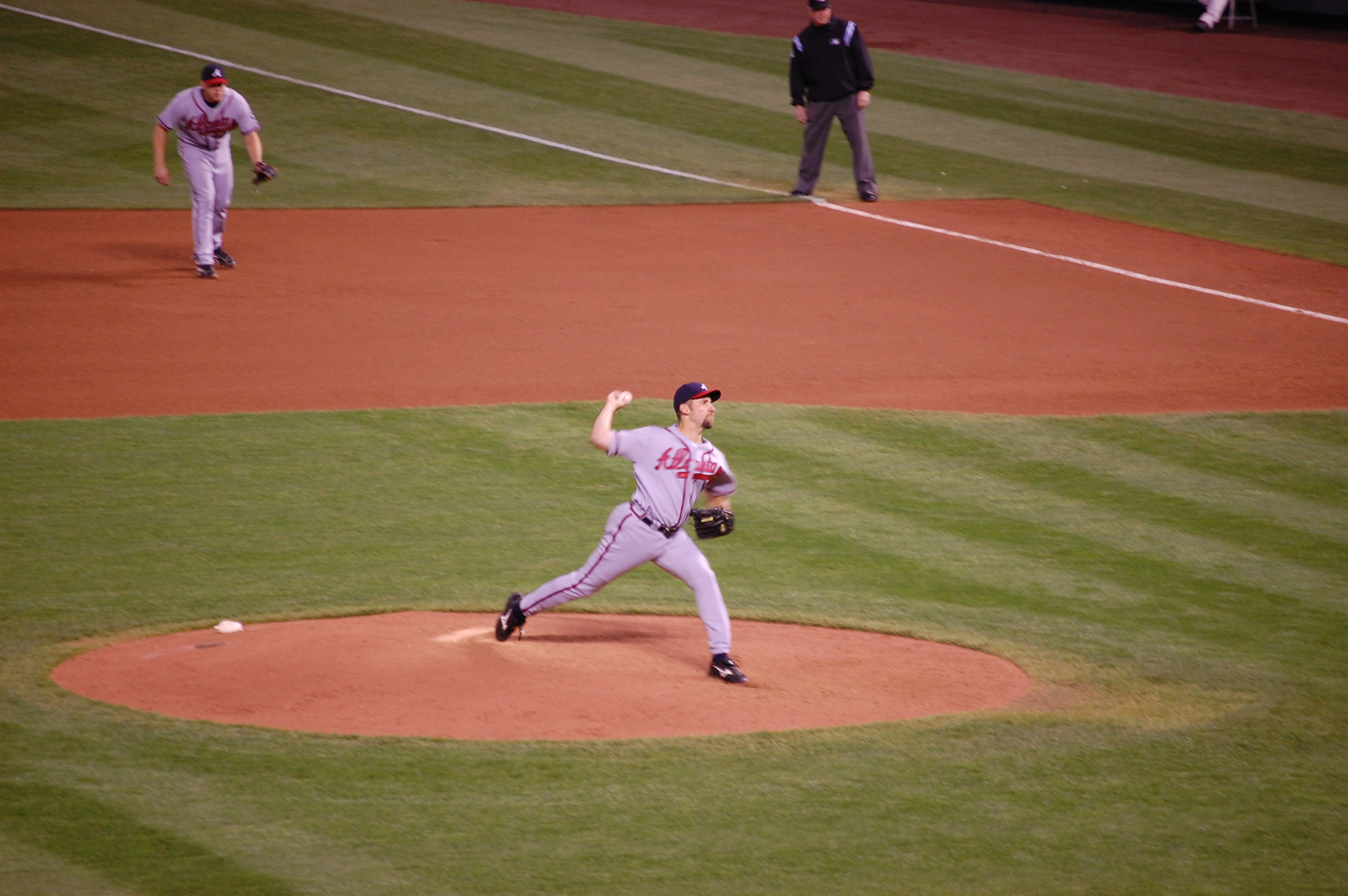
The Detroit Tigers selected John Smoltz in the 22nd round. Smoltz is a 8x All-Star, the 1996 Cy Young Award winner, and member of the 3,000 strikeout club. The National Baseball Hall of Fame inducted Smoltz as a member in 2015.

- Bruce Ruffin, 2nd round, 34th overall by the Philadelphia Phillies
- Mike Schooler, 2nd round, 35th overall by the Seattle Mariners
- Randy Johnson‡, 2nd round, 36th overall by the Montreal Expos
- Scott Servais, 2nd round, 48th overall by the New York Mets, but did not sign
- Wally Whitehurst, 3rd round, 65th overall by the Oakland Athletics
- Paul Abbott, 3rd round, 67th overall by the Minnesota Twins
- Tino Martinez†, 3rd round, 75th overall by the Boston Red Sox, but did not sign
- Bobby Thigpen†, 4th round, 85th overall by the Chicago White Sox
- David Justice†, 4th round, 94th overall by the Atlanta Braves
- Mike Macfarlane, 4th round, 97th overall by the Kansas City Royals
- Chad Kreuter, 5th round, 109th overall by the Texas Rangers
- Mike Devereaux, 5th round, 116th overall by the Los Angeles Dodgers
- Jeff Brantley†, 6th round, 134th overall by the San Francisco Giants
- Deion Sanders, 6th round, 149th overall by the Kansas City Royals, but did not sign
- Todd Pratt, 6th round, 153rd overall by the Boston Red Sox
- Doug Henry, 8th round, 185th overall by the Milwaukee Brewers
- Mark Gardner, 8th round, 192nd overall by the Montreal Expos
- Al Martin, 8th round, 198th overall by the Atlanta Braves
- Kevin Tapani, 9th round, 234th overall by the Chicago Cubs, but did not sign
- Jason Grimsley, 10th round, 252nd overall by the Philadelphia Phillies
- Brady Anderson†, 10th round, 257th overall by the Boston Red Sox
- Greg Harris, 10th round, 258th overall by the San Diego Padres
- Don Wakamatsu, 11th round, 266th overall by the Cincinnati Reds
- Jeff Manto, 14th round, 355th overall by the California Angels
- Mike Stanley†, 16th round, 395th overall by the Texas Rangers
- Dennis Cook, 18th round, 446th overall by the San Francisco Giants
- Randy Velarde, 19th round, 475th overall by the Chicago White Sox
- Brian Jordan†, 20th round, 505th overall by the Cleveland Indians, but did not sign
- Bo Jackson†, 20th round, 511th overall by the California Angels, but did not sign
- John Smoltz‡, 22nd round, 574th overall by the Detroit Tigers
- Mark Grace†, 24th round, 622nd overall by the Chicago Cubs
- Ed Sprague Jr.†, 26th round, 673rd overall by the Boston Red Sox, but did not sign
- Jim Abbott, 36th round, 826th overall by the Toronto Blue Jays, but did not sign

† All-Star
‡ Hall of Famer

=== NFL/NBA players drafted ===
- Mike Prior, 4th round, 90th overall by the Los Angeles Dodgers, but did not sign
- Dell Curry, 14th round, 359th overall by the Baltimore Orioles, but did not sign

Preceded by Shawn Abner	1st Overall Picks; B.J. Surhoff	Succeeded by Jeff King
