= Bill Doran (second baseman) =

American baseball player and manager (born 1958)

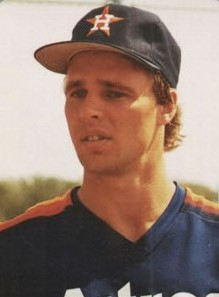
- Second baseman
- Born: May 28, 1958 (age 68); Cincinnati, Ohio, U.S.
- Batted: Switch Threw: Right

MLB debut
- September 6, 1982, for the Houston Astros

Last MLB appearance
- July 8, 1993, for the Milwaukee Brewers

MLB statistics
- Batting average: .266
- Home runs: 84
- Runs batted in: 497
- Stats at Baseball Reference

Teams
- Houston Astros (1982–1990); Cincinnati Reds (1990–1992); Milwaukee Brewers (1993)

Career highlights and awards
- World Series champion (1990); Houston Astros Hall of Fame

William Donald Doran (born May 28, 1958) is an American former professional baseball second baseman who played in Major League Baseball (MLB) from 1982 to 1993 with the Houston Astros, Cincinnati Reds and Milwaukee Brewers. He was the bench coach for the Kansas City Royals from 2005 to 2007 and posted a 4-6 record as the Royals' interim manager to close the 2006 season. Doran rejoined the Reds on November 2, 2007, as the minor league infielding/baserunning coordinator. After previously serving as the minor league field coordinator, Doran moved into the role of special assistant to the general manager, player performance role for the Reds for the 2019 season.

== Early life ==
Doran attended Mount Healthy High School and played baseball at the Miami University in Oxford, Ohio. At Mt. Healthy, he starred in baseball, basketball, and football, leading the Owls to several league championships as an All-League quarterback. In 1977, he played collegiate summer baseball with the Falmouth Commodores of the Cape Cod Baseball League.

== Baseball career ==
Selected by the Houston Astros in the sixth round of the 1979 amateur draft, Doran broke into the majors as a September call-up in the 1982 season. That year, he would play in 26 games while batting .278 on 27 hits. For the 1983 season, he would be the starting second baseman for the Astros, which started with Opening Day. He would play in 154 games and having a batting line of a .271 batting average to go with a .371 on-base percentage (OBP). In the fourth game of the year, he recorded his first career home run off John Candelaria of the Pittsburgh Pirates on April 10. Doran led the team in walks with 86 (with eleven being intentional, also a team high), which worked in contrast to his 67 strikeouts; dubiously, he would steal twelve bases but also be caught stealing twelve times. It was the first of eight times that he would have more walks than strikeouts in a season; he finished fifth in the Rookie of the Year Award, which went to Darryl Strawberry. He would decrease in productivity slightly in 1984, playing in 147 games while batting .271. He walked 66 times and struck out 69 times while having 143 hits and 41 runs batted in (RBI). Dubiously, while he was second in a general amount of offensive categories to José Cruz, he led the Astros in times caught stealing (12). For the following season, he batted .287 while playing 148 games, for which he would have 71 walks to go with 69 strikeouts. He led the Astros in runs, hits, walks, stolen bases and also times caught stealing. He received votes for the Most Valuable Player award.

The Astros, having experienced a downturn since the back-to-back playoff berths in 1980 and 1981, bounced back in 1986, and Doran was there to contribute. He played in 145 games while batting .276, stealing 42 bases alongside 81 walks to 57 strikeouts. He would lead the team in runs, stolen bases, and perhaps most dubiously in times caught stealing (19, which led the league). Doran finished eleventh in the voting for NL Most Valuable Player that year In the 1986 National League Championship Series, he would have a cold bat for most of the series, having six hits on 29 plate appearances. Doran hit a home run off Ron Darling in the second inning to give the Astros a 4-0 lead. However, the team could not hold it together for the last four innings and lost 6-5. In Game 5, with the series tied at two, he would hit a groundout with two runners on and one out in the fifth inning that scored the first run of the game, although the Mets would win it in the ninth on a walk-off hit in the 12th inning. In the pivotal Game 6, often thought of as one of the best postseason games played of the season, Doran would have a small part in the overall result. Doran had a single and was then forced out at second base in the first inning that would later see four straight Astros get on base and result in a 3-0 initial lead. The Mets would tie the game and the teams dueled it out until the 16th inning. Doran, with a runner on first and one out while trailing 7-4, hit a single to try and continue a potential rally. He would score the 6th run of the game for the Astros on a Glenn Davis single, but the next batter in Kevin Bass was struck out by Jesse Orosco to end the game and series.

Before the 1987 season, Doran lost an arbitration case with the Astros, as he had sought a raise of $275,000 from his previous salary (which was $550,000), with the result being that he was paid only $625,000. He had his best year that season, as he led the NL in games played (162), batted .283, hit a career high 16 home runs, had a career high .992 fielding percentage, and scored a career high 79 runs. Doran however would recoil in the following year. He batted .248 while playing in 132 games while having 65 walks to 60 strikeouts. After the season, Doran underwent rotator cuff surgery.

He had much of the same success with the following year, as he batted .219 but managed to play in 142 games while having 22 stolen bases and 59 walks to 63 strikeouts. He recorded his 1,000th hit on June 16, doing so on a home run off Ed Whitson against the San Diego Padres. For the 1990 season, it was to be his last with the Astros. On August 30, he was traded for Terry McGriff, Keith Kaiser, and Butch Henry to the Cincinnati Reds, his hometown team. He had turned down a trade to the New York Mets the day before. Although the Reds won the World Series that year, Doran had back surgery the day the team clinched the division pennant and he missed the rest of the season. "I didn't feel like I belonged. I was just a rented player", Doran said. In a combined season of 126 games, he batted .300 while having 23 stolen bases with 79 walks to 58 strikeouts. He would sign with the Reds for the next two seasons. He played 111 games the following year, batting .280 while having 46 walks to 39 strikeouts. His 1992 season was his last as a mostly-every day player, since he appeared in 132 games while batting .235, while Bip Roberts emerged as a standout player to use on second base more so than Doran. He had 64 walks to 40 strikeouts. A purchase from Milwaukee in January 1993 did not lend itself to increased time, as he would play just 28 games for the Brewers while dealing with injuries. He batted .217 while having just one stolen base.

Doran had a career .266 batting average, but had four seasons when he placed in the top 10 in the National League in bases on balls. Doran never made an All-Star team, but was extraordinarily popular at The Astrodome and admired for his hustle and ferocity, reminiscent of Cincinnati native Pete Rose. He was widely considered the best Astros second baseman in team history until the emergence of Craig Biggio, who eclipsed Doran in offensive statistics but never approached Doran's defensive capacity. He is among the career leaders in many offensive categories for the Astros. He is top 10 in at bats (8th), runs (8th), hits (8th), singles (8th), triples (10th), total bases (9th), and bases on balls (6th). He is one of thirteen Astros to have collected 1,000 hits.

Doran became a minor league instructor for the Reds in 1995. In 1999 and 2000, Doran served as the organization's minor league field coordinator, director of player development and assistant to the general manager. He became a major league coach for the Reds in November 2000. After a 96-loss season in 2001, the Reds did not renew the contracts of Doran or third base coach Ron Oester. Doran joined the Kansas City Royals coaching staff in 2005 and became their bench coach the following year. He is currently a special assistant to the Reds.

On January 21, 2023, the Astros announced that Doran was to be inducted into the Houston Astros Hall of Fame as part of the class of 2023 with former broadcaster Bill Brown. An induction ceremony was held at Minute Maid Park prior to the start a contest versus the Los Angeles Angels on August 12, 2023.

== See also ==
- Houston Astros award winners and league leaders
- List of Houston Astros team records
- List of Major League Baseball career assists as a second baseman leaders
- List of Major League Baseball career games played as a second baseman leaders
- List of Major League Baseball career putouts as a second baseman leaders
- List of Major League Baseball career stolen bases leaders
