= Candy Sierra =

Puerto Rican baseball player (born 1967)

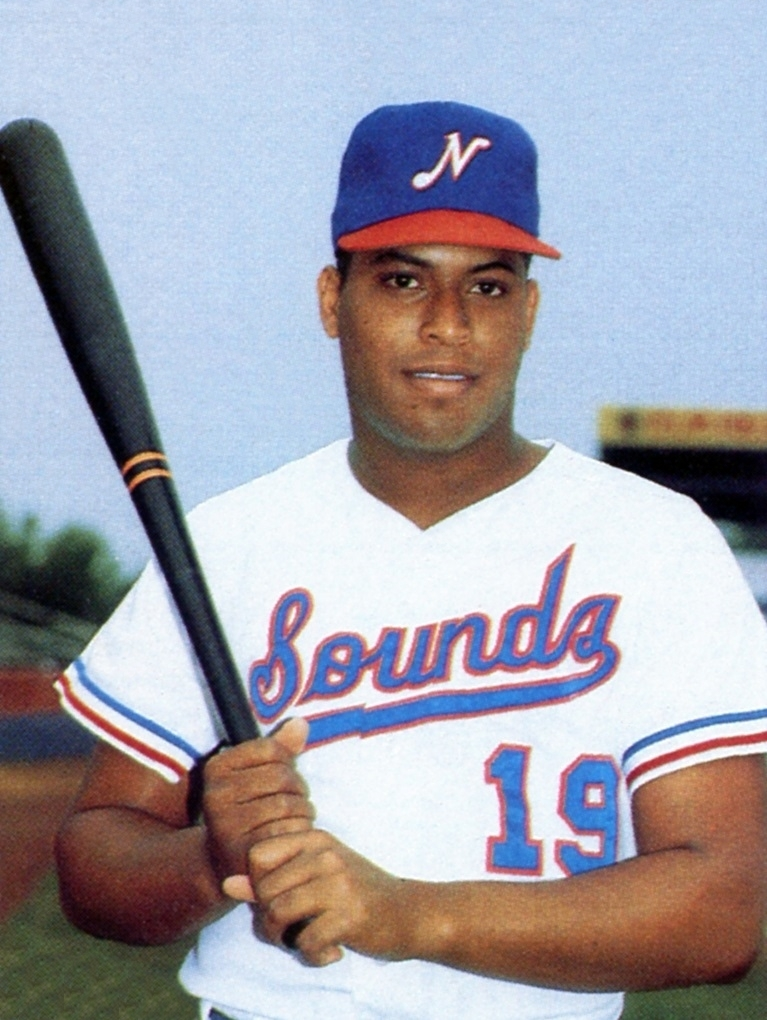
- Sierra with the Nashville Sounds in 1988
- Pitcher
- Born: March 27, 1967 (age 59); Río Piedras, Puerto Rico
- Batted: Right Threw: Right

MLB debut
- April 6, 1988, for the San Diego Padres

Last MLB appearance
- June 10, 1988, for the Cincinnati Reds

MLB statistics
- Win–loss record: 0–1
- Earned run average: 5.53
- Strikeouts: 24
- Stats at Baseball Reference

Teams
- San Diego Padres (1988); Cincinnati Reds (1988)

Ulises "Candy" Sierra Pizarro (born March 27, 1967) is a Puerto Rican former Major League Baseball right-handed pitcher.

== Career ==
Signed by the San Diego Padres as an amateur free agent in 1983, Sierra would make his Major League Baseball debut with the San Diego Padres on April 6, 1988. Two months later, he was dealt to the Cincinnati Reds for Dennis Rasmussen, and he appeared in his final big league game on June 10, 1988.

== See also ==
- List of Major League Baseball players from Puerto Rico
