= Bip Roberts =

American baseball player (born 1963)

- Second baseman / Left fielder
- Born: October 27, 1963 (age 62); Berkeley, California, U.S.
- Batted: Switch Threw: Right

MLB debut
- April 7, 1986, for the San Diego Padres

Last MLB appearance
- September 27, 1998, for the Oakland Athletics

MLB statistics
- Batting average: .294
- Home runs: 30
- Runs batted in: 352
- Stolen bases: 264
- Stats at Baseball Reference

Teams
- San Diego Padres (1986, 1988–1991); Cincinnati Reds (1992–1993); San Diego Padres (1994–1995); Kansas City Royals (1996–1997); Cleveland Indians (1997); Detroit Tigers (1998); Oakland Athletics (1998)

Career highlights and awards
- All-Star (1992)

Leon Joseph "Bip" Roberts (born October 27, 1963) is an American former Major League Baseball second baseman and outfielder who played from 1986 to 1998 for the San Diego Padres, Cincinnati Reds, Kansas City Royals, Cleveland Indians, Detroit Tigers, and Oakland Athletics.

== Career ==
He was a speedy second baseman, largely associated with the San Diego Padres. Originally drafted by the Pittsburgh Pirates in the first round of the Draft as a supplemental pick in 1982, after stealing a combined 90 bases in his two previous minor league seasons, Roberts was taken by the San Diego Padres in the Rule 5 draft in December 1985, thus being required to stay on Padres' major league roster for the entirety of the 1986 season.

As a rookie, Roberts was successful in 14 out of 26 steal attempts, and served as a pinch hitter. He spent the next two seasons in Triple-A, where he would hit .306 in 1987 and .353 in 1988 with 10 triples in 98 games in 1987. His stolen base totals were also once again stellar, being 39 and 45 respectively, which caused San Diego to call him up at the end of 1988, where he played in 5 games, seeing time at third and second base, as well as pinch hitting.

Roberts hit .301 in 1989 with 21 steals and 81 runs in 329 at bats. He played all outfield positions, shortstop, second, and third. In 1990, Roberts ranked in the top 10 in the National League in doubles (36), steals (46), and runs (104).

In 1991, Roberts again was injured limited to 117 games, but still managed to hit .281 with 26 stolen bases. In December 1991, the Cincinnati Reds sent pitcher Randy Myers in exchange for Roberts.

In 1992, Roberts was selected as a National League All-Star, going 2-for-2 with two RBI. Roberts was also named the Cincinnati Reds team MVP, and was 8th in voting for the NL MVP, stealing 44 bases, and hitting .323. He also tied an NL record in 1992 with ten consecutive base hits.

Roberts faced several injuries and was limited to only 83 games. The Reds also suffered injuries to Kevin Mitchell, Roberto Kelly, Barry Larkin, and Hal Morris. Their season suffered as a result, but Roberts managed 26 stolen bases in the shortened stint.

After the 1993 season, he re-signed with the Padres. In 1994, Roberts recorded an MLB best 24-game hitting streak for the Padres. The strike-shortened season compromised his season as he was hitting .320 with over 20 steals yet again. He was also second in the NL in singles, and broke up Pedro Martínez's extra inning perfect game in the 10th inning with a double.

While Roberts played half of the 1995 season, he stole 20 bases, only being caught twice, while batting .304. In December, Roberts was dealt to the Kansas City Royals in exchange for first baseman Wally Joyner.

Roberts had trouble adapting to the American League, not hitting as well as he did in the NL, and losing a little speed. He was sent to the Cleveland Indians in mid-1997. He would go on to play heavily for the Indians in the postseason, although he missed a game in the World Series due to flu-like symptoms.

The Detroit Tigers signed Roberts for the 1998 season, before trading him to the Oakland Athletics. While Roberts' batting average dropped in his final season, he remained a reliable offensive player, maintaining a .340 OBP.

In 1202 games over 12 seasons, Roberts posted a .294 batting average (1220-for-4147) with 663 runs, 203 doubles, 31 triples, 30 home runs, 352 RBI, 264 stolen bases, 396 bases on balls, .358 on-base percentage and .380 slugging percentage. He finished his career with a .976 fielding percentage. In 16 postseason games, he hit .246 (15-for-61) with 4 runs, 5 doubles, 5 RBI, 3 stolen bases and 5 walks.

== Other work ==
Roberts has worked for NBC Sports Bay Area as co-host for the Oakland Athletics pre-game telecasts.

In 2008, Roberts took over as the head coach for the Skyline High School baseball team in Oakland, California.

He was an assistant coach to the Academy of Art Urban Knights NCAA Division II PacWest baseball program from 2010–2012.

Aside from his work in the broadcast booth, Roberts has donated his time to the Students Rising Above Foundation, which helps low-income, at-risk Bay Area kids overcome obstacles.

In July 2024, Roberts expressed interest in possibly running for office to become Mayor of Oakland, California, should the recall of current Mayor Sheng Thao proceed.

== Personal life ==
Roberts is the nephew of former NFL player Roy Shivers.

== See also ==
- List of Major League Baseball career stolen bases leaders
