= Cameron Drew =

American baseball player (born 1964)

- Outfielder
- Born: February 12, 1964 (age 62); Boston, Massachusetts, U.S.
- Batted: Left Threw: Right

MLB debut
- September 9, 1988, for the Houston Astros

Last MLB appearance
- September 20, 1988, for the Houston Astros

MLB statistics
- Batting average: .188
- Home runs: 0
- Runs batted in: 1
- Stats at Baseball Reference

Teams
- Houston Astros (1988)

Cameron Steward Drew (born February 12, 1964) is an American former professional baseball player. He made his Major League Baseball debut on September 9, 1988. Previous knee injuries limited his major league career to seven games.

Drew was drafted by the Houston Astros in the 1st round (12th pick) of the 1985 amateur draft after starring on the University of New Haven baseball team.

Drew collected numerous awards in his brief rise through the minor leagues and was tapped by many scouts at the time to be a superstar. He had a seven-game stint during a September 1988 call-up, but never again played in the majors. In 1991 Drew was hitless in three at bats with the Kinston Indians in the Single A Carolina League. His retirement from baseball was attributed to damaged knees from basketball injuries.
