= Craig Reynolds (baseball) =

American baseball player (born 1952)

- Reynolds in 1981 photo
- Shortstop
- Born: December 27, 1952 (age 73); Houston, Texas, U.S.
- Batted: Left Threw: Right

MLB debut
- August 1, 1975, for the Pittsburgh Pirates

Last MLB appearance
- September 27, 1989, for the Houston Astros

MLB statistics
- Batting average: .256
- Home runs: 42
- Runs batted in: 377
- Stats at Baseball Reference

Teams
- Pittsburgh Pirates (1975–1976); Seattle Mariners (1977–1978); Houston Astros (1979–1989)

Career highlights and awards
- 2× All-Star (1978, 1979)

Gordon Craig Reynolds (born December 27, 1952) is an American former Major League Baseball (MLB) shortstop who was an inaugural member of the Seattle Mariners. He began his professional career in the Pittsburgh Pirates organization and played for over a decade with the Houston Astros. Reynolds batted left-handed and threw right.

== Early life ==
As a senior at Reagan High School in 1971, Reynolds was named the Greater Houston High School Athlete of the Year. That spring, he was selected by the Pittsburgh Pirates in the first round of the 1971 Major League Baseball draft.

== MLB career ==
=== Pittsburgh Pirates ===
Reynolds batted a solid .318 in his first professional season with the Gulf Coast League Pirates, but with no power, and he committed 25 errors on the field. His game improved substantially in all areas by 1974, when he batted .299 with six home runs and logged a .957 fielding percentage while splitting the season at Double-A & Triple-A.

He emerged as one of the Pirates' top minor league prospects, batting .294 over five minor league seasons when he made his major league debut in 1975. Reynolds spent the 1976 season in Triple-A with the Charleston Charlies before being called up in September when rosters expanded.

=== Seattle Mariners ===
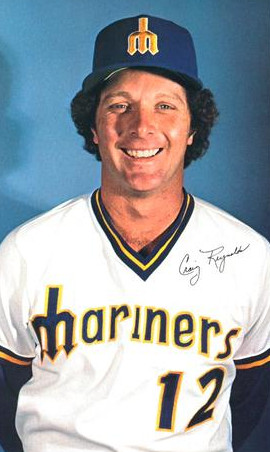
Reynolds in 1978.

The Seattle Mariners selected Grant Jackson from the New York Yankees with their eleventh pick in the 1976 Major League Baseball expansion draft. A month later, they traded Jackson to the Pirates for Reynolds and Jimmy Sexton.

Reynolds immediately became the starting shortstop in Seattle, where his light hitting usually had him at or near the bottom of the M's batting order. His lack of strikeouts and ability to move runners over, however, landed him in the second spot early in the 1978 season. He was batting .306 with three home runs, 29 RBI and 27 runs scored at the All-Star break; he was the Mariners' sole representative on the American League squad, but did not appear in the game. After the season, he was acquired by his hometown Houston Astros in exchange for future AL strikeout champion Floyd Bannister.

=== Houston Astros ===
After Garry Templeton declined his invitation to the 1979 All-Star Game, National League manager Tommy Lasorda added Reynolds to his team. As a result, Reynolds became the only shortstop in MLB history to be selected to the AL and NL squads in consecutive seasons. He batted .265 his first season with the Astros, but more importantly, he helped solidify the Houston infield with a .965 fielding percentage. After the season, he was presented with the Danny Thompson Memorial Award for exemplifying Christian spirit in the Major Leagues. "When you receive an award like that, you’re humbled by it," Reynolds said.

Reynolds suffered through a subpar 1980 season. That same year, however, the Astros won their first division crown in franchise history. On May 16, 1981, Reynolds tied the major-league record with three triples in one game and led the NL with a dozen three-baggers that season. He ended the season tied for the league lead with the San Diego Padres' Gene Richards with twelve in spite of the strike-shortened season.

He played with the Astros for eleven seasons for a total of 1,170 games, which still ranks in the top 15 in franchise history as of 2026; for players that played at least 50 percent of their games at shortstop, he is first in franchise history.

== After baseball ==
In retirement he entered the world of wealth management in Houston, partnering with former Astros teammate Terry Puhl.

Reynolds currently serves as a pastor at Second Baptist Church North Campus in Houston.

== See also ==
- List of Houston Astros team records
- List of Major League Baseball annual triples leaders
