= 1995 Houston Astros season =

1995 Houston Astros
- League: National League
- Division: Central
- Ballpark: The Astrodome
- City: Houston, Texas
- Record: 76–68 (.528)
- Divisional place: 2nd
- Owners: Drayton McLane, Jr.
- General managers: Bob Watson
- Managers: Terry Collins
- Television: KTXH; Prime Sports Southwest
- Radio: KPRC (AM) (Bill Brown, Milo Hamilton, Larry Dierker, Vince Controneo, Bill Worrell); KXYZ (Francisco Ernesto Ruiz, Danny Gonzalez)

The 1995 Houston Astros season was the 34th season for the Major League Baseball (MLB) franchise located in Houston, Texas, their 31st as the Astros, 34th in the National League (NL), second in the NL Central division, and 31st at The Astrodome. The Astros entered the season with a 66–49 record, a second-place finish and 1/2 game behind the first-place Cincinnati Reds, prior to the cancellation of the remaining 47 games of the regular season and entire playoffs as a response to the players' strike.

The strike continued to impact the start of the 1995 season, leading to further cancellation of the first 18 games of the regular season. The season began for Houston on April 26 at Jack Murphy Stadium, where pitcher Doug Drabek made his second Opening Day start for the Astros, who defeated the San Diego Padres, 10–2.

Second baseman Craig Biggio was selected to represent the Astros at the MLB All-Star game, his fourth career selection. The Astros' first-round draft pick in the amateur draft was pitcher Tony McKnight, at 22nd overall.

With a 76–68 finish and 9 games out of first place behind the division-champion Cincinnati in the NL Central, the Astros secured their fourth consecutive season with a record of at least .500—an unprecedented feat for the organization at the time—and a second-consecutive finish as high as second place. The Astros were also runners-up in the NL Wild Card race, trailing the Colorado Rockies by 1 game.

Following the season, Biggio earned his third career Silver Slugger Award, and second career Gold Glove Award, while shortstop Orlando Miller was selected to the Topps All-Star Rookie Team. Former Astros outfielder Terry Puhl was inducted into the Canadian Baseball Hall of Fame.

== Offseason ==
=== Summary ===
The Houston Astros concluded the strike-shortened 1994 campaign with a 66–49 (.574) record through 115 games, trailing the Cincinnati Reds by a 1/2 game for the National League (NL) Central division lead and the Atlanta Braves by 2 1/2 games in the NL Wild Card race. No playoffs were held, either, as a response to the players' strike. Awards were still bestowed in spite of the truncated campaign, and first baseman Jeff Bagwell became the fourth National Leaguer to be unanimously selected for the Most Valuable Player (MVP) Award, (Note: Succeeded Carl Hubbell (1936), Orlando Cepeda (1967), and Mike Schmidt (1980.)) and first Astro to win an MVP. Bagwell ranked second in the league each with a .368 batting average and 39 home runs, while leading with 104 runs scored, 116 runs batted in (RBI), and .750 slugging percentage (SLG), the latter figure of which was highest in the National League since Rogers Hornsby in 1925 (.756). Second baseman Craig Biggio led the NL in doubles (44) (Note: Tied with Larry Walker of the Montreal Expos.) and stolen bases (39). Moreover, the infield duo became the first players in club history to be conferred with the both Gold Glove and Silver Slugger Awards for their respective positions during the same season.

=== Transactions ===
- December 28, 1994: Ken Caminiti, Andújar Cedeño, Steve Finley, Roberto Petagine, Brian Williams and a player to be named later were traded by the Astros to the San Diego Padres for Derek Bell, Doug Brocail, Ricky Gutiérrez, Pedro A. Martínez, Phil Plantier, and Craig Shipley. The Astros completed the deal by sending Sean Fesh (minors) to the Padres on May 1, 1995.

== Regular season ==
=== Summary ===
==== April—May ====
Opening Day starting lineup
Uniform	Player	Position
7	Craig Biggio	Second baseman
26	Luis Gonzalez	Left fielder
5	Jeff Bagwell	First baseman
14	Derek Bell	Center fielder
17	Phil Plantier	Right fielder
18	Dave Magadan	Third baseman
9	Scott Servais	Catcher
24	Orlando Miller	Shortstop
15	Doug Drabek	Pitcher
Venue: Jack Murphy Stadium • Houston 10, San Diego 2 Sources:

The Astros commenced their 1995 campaign on April 26 at Jack Murphy Stadium, where they defeated the San Diego Padres, 10–2. During the top of the third inning, Jeff Bagwell cranked the premier home run of the season off his final pitcher faced from the year prior—a hit by pitch had fractured his left hand—Padres starter Andy Benes. The following batter, Derek Bell, took Benes deep to give the Astros a 3–0 advantage. Former Padre Phil Plantier also homered and delivered two runs batted in (RBI). During the top of the eighth, the Astros scored five unearned runs as Bagwell and Bell coaxed bases-loaded walks, and Luis Gonzalez scored on an error by new Padres third baseman Ken Caminiti. Dave Magadan then singled in Bagwell and Bell. Doug Drabek made his second Opening Day start for Houston, worked five innings, and picked up the victory.

Catcher Tony Eusebio cranked his first career grand slam on May 19, in the bottom of the seventh off Reid Cornelius. This punctuated a 10-2 triumph over the Montreal Expos. Earlier in the contest, young pitcher Pedro Martinez yielded a home run to Jeff Bagwell, his third of the season.

With the score tied 1–1 on May 20, Expos pitcher Jeff Shaw walked in Craig Biggio for the game-winning run as Houston won, 2–1.

==== June ====
Greg Swindell got a run batted in (RBI)-double on June 5 to bring the Astros back against the Florida Marlins. Meanwhile, Biggio delivered a three-run, walk-off home run with two outs in the bottom of the ninth inning to secure a 6–5 Houston win.

On June 16, the Astros outlasted the New York Mets in a 16-inning thriller to win, 7-5. Houston had gained the lead two separate times in extra innings, first in the 12th and again in the 15th. The Astros recaptured the lead for good after loading the bases for Jeff Bagwell.

Bagwell crushed his 100th career home run on June 20, launching a Gil Heredia offering over the left field wall at Olympic Stadium in the top of the seventh inning. The solo home run extended Houston's lead to 5–2 over the Montreal Expos.

Derek Bell had four hits on June 23 against the Chicago Cubs, while the Astros tied the game 2–2 in the bottom of the ninth. Bell's fourth hit came in the 12th inning, where he delivered the game-winning RBI for a 3–2 Astros win.

On June 25, the Astros erupted for a club-record 19 runs, pulverizing Cubs pitching in a 19–6 final at the Astrodome. Bagwell connected for a three-run blast in the seventh and led the way with five RBI. The home team poured it on during their final at bat in the eighth. John Cangelosi drilled a three-run blast off Bryan Hickerson as the Astros scored nine more times.

Orlando Miller crushed a three-run blast on June 26 and drove in five to lead an 11–0 blanking of the St. Louis Cardinals. Greg Swindell spun a complete game shutout as he received 10 runs of support within the opening two frames. Luis Gonzalez provided three hits and plated three runs.

On June 28, Eusebio launched his second career grand slam of the season during the bottom of the eighth inning at the Astrodome, to put the finishing touches on a 9–0 blowout over the Cardinals. The Astros cranked five doubles, including two from Bagwell. Mike Hampton fired eight shutout innings to pick up his second win of the season. Meanwhile, coinciding with the contest of Eusebio's first grand slam, a Pedro Martínez took the mound, this time for the Astros, with the left-hander finishing off the contest with a scoreless ninth inning. Eusebio became just the second player to hit two grand slams inside the Astrodome during the same season, succeeding Mark Bailey on August 20, 1985. Eusebio was the sixth to hit two total grand slams at the Astrodome, succeeding Terry Puhl on September 28, 1987. (Note: On April 6, 1996, Ken Caminiti joined this two-grand slam club.)

==== MLB All-Star Game ====
Second baseman Craig Biggio was selected to the starting lineup for the National League at the MLB All-Star game, where he slugged a home run, the first Astro to hit a home run in the All-Star Game since César Cedeño in the 1976 Classic. The first Houston Astros All-Star starter at any position since pitcher Mike Scott in 1987, Biggio joined Joe Morgan as Astros second basemen to be elected as starters. However, it was Biggio who became first in club history to be in the All-Star starting lineup at second base. (Note: Chosen as the starting second baseman in the 1966 All-Star Game, Morgan was unable to participate due to injury.)

==== Rest of July—October ====
During consecutive games on July 14 and 15, Jeff Bagwell became the fifth hitter in team history to record four hits each over consecutive games, succeeding César Cedeño on September 12 and 13, 1977. Bagwell homered twice and drove in five runners. (Note: Next accomplished for Houston by Miguel Tejada on April 21 and 22, 2008. Criteria: Longest streak of consecutive games, playing for HOU, in the regular season, requiring Hits ≥ 4, sorted by most games matching criteria.)

Left-hander Billy Wagner landed his major league debut on September 13, facing a single batter during the one and only major league appearance of the season for the southpaw who bore jersey number 13. Wagner entered during the bottom of the sixth at Shea Stadium and faced and retired Rico Brogna on fly ball to center field. The Mets ran away with this one, 10–5. Damon Buford took Astros starter Mike Hampton (9–7) deep twice. Future Astros Carl Everett and Jeff Kent also feasted on mistake offerings, taking them deep.

The Astros took the chase for MLB's first-ever Wild Card since the conclusion of the players' strike to the final day of the regular season, and finished as runners-up to the Colorado Rockies for the NL title by one game. Thus, they made their closest bid to their first playoff berth in nine seasons. (Note: Though the Astros trailed the Reds for first place by 1/2 game at the conclusion of the 1994 campaign, no playoff bid was possible due to its cancellation.)

==== Performance overview ====
With a final record of 76–68, this Astros club produced the fourth consecutive arc since 1992 with a record of at least .500—unprecedented in any prior instance in franchise history—while also matching the 1979, 1980, 1981 clubs with three successive winning campaigns, the longest to that point in franchise history. Not losing momentum, Houston surpassed this franchise record the following year, and would continue to intervene to extend this new record through the 1999 campaign.

The 1995 Astros set club records for runs scored (747) and on-base percentage (.353 OBP), surpassing the 1970 (744 runs) and 1994 squads (.347 OBP), while finishing second to the latter team in batting average (.278, .275). The Astros broke the franchise runs-scored record again the following year and for OBP in 1998. In the National League, Houston ranked first in OBP and bases on balls (566), second in each of batting, hits (1403), and stolen bases (176), and fourth in on-base plus slugging (.752 OPS).

Biggio was recognized with both the Silver Slugger and Gold Glove Awards for the second consecutive year, becoming the first Astros player with both awards over successive campaigns, and the first Astro to win either award for the position at second base. Having won the Silver Slugger at catcher in 1989, Biggio took over the lead for total Silver Sluggers won in club history, with three. He joined José Cruz (1983 and 1984) as just the second Astro to win the Silver Slugger in consecutive years. Biggio became the first Astro since César Cedeño (1975 and 1976) to win consecutive Gold Glove Awards, while also joining Cedeño and Doug Rader as the third Astro with multiple Gold Gloves (5 each).

Rookie right-hander Dave Veres whiffed 94 batters to establish a club rookie record for rookie relievers, exceeding Dave Smith, who fanned 85 hitters during the 1980 campaign. (Note: Surpassed by Brad Lidge (97) in 2003. Criteria: For single seasons, at least 80% games in relief, playing for HOU, a rookie, in the regular season, requiring strikeouts ≥ 65, sorted by ascending season.) Veres also led NL rookie relievers in the category for the season, while equaling Troy Percival of the California Angels for the major league lead. (Note: For single seasons, in 1995, at least 80% games in relief, a rookie, in the regular season, requiring strikeouts ≥ 50, sorted by descending strikeouts.)

=== Season standings ===
NL Central
Team	W	L	Pct.	GB	Home	Road
Cincinnati Reds	85	59	.590	—	44‍–‍28	41‍–‍31
Houston Astros	76	68	.528	9	36‍–‍36	40‍–‍32
Chicago Cubs	73	71	.507	12	34‍–‍38	39‍–‍33
St. Louis Cardinals	62	81	.434	22½	39‍–‍33	23‍–‍48
Pittsburgh Pirates	58	86	.403	27	31‍–‍41	27‍–‍45

=== Record vs. opponents ===
1995 National League record Source: MLB Standings Grid – 1995
Team	ATL	CHC	CIN	COL	FLA	HOU	LAD	MON	NYM	PHI	PIT	SD	SF	STL
Atlanta	—	8–4	8–5	9–4	10–3	6–6	5–4	9–4	5–8	7–6	4–2	5–2	7–1	7–5
Chicago	4–8	—	3–7	6–7	8–4	5–8	7–5	3–5	4–3	6–1	8–5	5–7	5–7	9–4
Cincinnati	5–8	7–3	—	5–7	6–6	12–1	4–3	8–4	7–5	9–3	8–5	3–6	3–3	8–5
Colorado	4–9	7–6	7–5	—	5–7	4–4	4–9	7–1	5–4	4–2	8–4	9–4	8–5	5–7
Florida	3–10	4–8	6–6	7–5	—	8–4	3–7	6–7	7–6	6–7	5–8	3–2	5–3	4–3
Houston	6–6	8–5	1–12	4–4	4–8	—	3–2	9–3	6–6	5–7	9–4	7–4	5–3	9–4
Los Angeles	4–5	5–7	3–4	9–4	7–3	2–3	—	7–5	6–6	4–9	9–4	7–6	8–5	7–5
Montreal	4–9	5–3	4–8	1–7	7–6	3–9	5–7	—	7–6	8–5	4–4	7–5	7–6	4–3
New York	8–5	3–4	5–7	4–5	6–7	6–6	6–6	6–7	—	7–6	4–3	6–7	5–8	3–4
Philadelphia	6–7	1–6	3–9	2–4	7–6	7–5	9–4	5–8	6–7	—	6–3	6–6	6–6	5–4
Pittsburgh	2–4	5–8	5–8	4–8	8–5	4–9	4–9	4–4	3–4	3–6	—	4–8	6–6	6–7
San Diego	2–5	7–5	6–3	4–9	2–3	4–7	6–7	5–7	7–6	6–6	8–4	—	6–7	7–5
San Francisco	1–7	7–5	3–3	5–8	3–5	3–5	5–8	6–7	8–5	6–6	6–6	7–6	—	7–6
St. Louis	5–7	4–9	5–8	7–5	3–4	4-9	5–7	3–4	4–3	4–5	7–6	5–7	6–7	—

=== Notable transactions ===
- July 2, 1995: Johan Santana was signed as an amateur free agent by the Astros.
- July 19, 1995: Phil Plantier was traded by the Astros to the San Diego Padres for Rich Loiselle and Jeff Tabaka.
- August 10, 1995: The Astros traded a player to be named later to the Detroit Tigers for Mike Henneman. The Astros completed the deal by sending Phil Nevin to the Tigers on August 15.

=== Roster ===
1995 Houston Astros
Roster
Pitchers: 46 Doug Brocail; 49 Jim Dougherty; 15 Doug Drabek; 10 Mike Hampton; 58 Dean Hartgraves; 39 Mike Henneman; 35 John Hudek; 59 Todd Jones; 57 Darryl Kile; 41,42 Pedro Martínez; 38 Craig McMurtry; 52 Ross Powell; 37 Shane Reynolds; 21,41 Greg Swindell; 31 Jeff Tabaka; 43 Dave Veres; 13 Billy Wagner; 56 Donne Wall	Catchers: 17 Pat Borders; 20 Tony Eusebio; 9 Jerry Goff; 9 Scott Servais; 31,36 Eddie Tucker; 3 Rick Wilkins; Infielders: 5 Jeff Bagwell; 7 Craig Biggio; 3 Chris Donnels; 12 Ricky Gutiérrez; 18,22 Dave Magadan; 24 Orlando Miller; 21 Phil Nevin; 16,18 Craig Shipley; 23 Mike Simms; 4 Andy Stankiewicz	Outfielders: 14 Derek Bell; 36 Mike Brumley; 27 John Cangelosi; 26 Luis Gonzalez; 19 Brian Hunter; 16 Derrick May; 18,6 James Mouton; 17 Phil Plantier; 28 Milt Thompson; Other batters: 21 Dave Hajek	Manager: 2 Terry Collins; Coaches: 29 Jesse Barfield (first base); 48 Matt Galante (third base); 55 Steve Henderson (hitting); 1 Julio Linares (bench); 30 Mel Stottlemyre (pitching)

== Player stats ==
=== Batting ===
==== Starters by position ====
Note: Pos = Position; G = Games played; AB = At bats; H = Hits; Avg. = Batting average; HR = Home runs; RBI = Runs batted in

Pos	Player	G	AB	H	Avg.	HR	RBI
C	Tony Eusebio	113	368	110	.299	6	58
1B	Jeff Bagwell	114	448	130	.290	21	87
2B	Craig Biggio	141	553	167	.302	22	77
SS	Orlando Miller	92	324	85	.262	5	36
3B	Dave Magadan	127	348	109	.313	2	51
LF	Luis Gonzalez	56	209	54	.258	6	35
CF	Brian Hunter	78	321	97	.302	2	28
RF	Derek Bell	112	452	151	.334	8	86

==== Other batters ====
Note: G = Games played; AB = At bats; H = Hits; Avg. = Batting average; HR = Home runs; RBI = Runs batted in

Player	G	AB	H	Avg.	HR	RBI
James Mouton	104	298	78	.262	4	27
Craig Shipley	92	232	61	.263	3	24
Derrick May	78	206	62	.301	8	41
John Cangelosi	90	201	64	.318	2	18
Ricky Gutiérrez	52	156	43	.276	0	12
Milt Thompson	92	132	29	.220	2	19
Mike Simms	50	121	31	.256	9	24
Scott Servais	28	89	20	.225	1	12
Phil Plantier	22	68	17	.250	4	15
Phil Nevin	18	60	7	.117	0	1
Andy Stankiewicz	43	52	6	.115	0	7
Rick Wilkins	15	40	10	.250	1	5
Pat Borders	11	35	4	.114	0	0
Chris Donnels	19	30	9	.300	0	2
Jerry Goff	12	26	4	.154	1	3
Mike Brumley	18	18	1	.056	1	2
Eddie Tucker	5	7	2	.286	1	1
Dave Hajek	5	2	0	.000	0	0

=== Pitching ===
==== Starting pitchers ====
Note: G = Games pitched; IP = Innings pitched; W = Wins; L = Losses; ERA = Earned run average; SO = Strikeouts

Player	G	IP	W	L	ERA	SO
Shane Reynolds	30	189.1	10	11	3.47	175
Doug Drabek	31	185.0	10	9	4.77	143
Greg Swindell	33	153.0	10	9	4.47	96
Mike Hampton	24	150.2	9	8	3.35	115
Darryl Kile	25	127.0	4	12	4.96	113

==== Other pitchers ====
Note: G = Games pitched; IP = Innings pitched; W = Wins; L = Losses; ERA = Earned run average; SO = Strikeouts

Player	G	IP	W	L	ERA	SO
Doug Brocail	36	77.1	6	4	4.19	39
Donne Wall	6	24.1	3	1	5.55	16

==== Relief pitchers ====
Note: G = Games pitched; W = Wins; L = Losses; SV = Saves; ERA = Earned run average; SO = Strikeouts

Player	G	W	L	SV	ERA	SO
Todd Jones	68	6	5	15	3.07	96
Dave Veres	72	5	1	1	2.26	94
Jim Dougherty	56	8	4	0	4.92	49
Dean Hartgraves	40	2	0	0	3.22	24
Pedro Martínez	25	0	0	0	7.40	17
Jeff Tabaka	24	1	0	0	2.22	19
Mike Henneman	21	0	1	8	3.00	19
John Hudek	19	2	2	7	5.40	29
Ross Powell	15	0	0	0	11.00	8
Craig McMurtry	11	0	1	0	7.84	4
John Cangelosi	1	0	0	0	0.00	0
Billy Wagner	1	0	0	0	0.00	0

== Awards and achievements ==
=== Grand slams ===
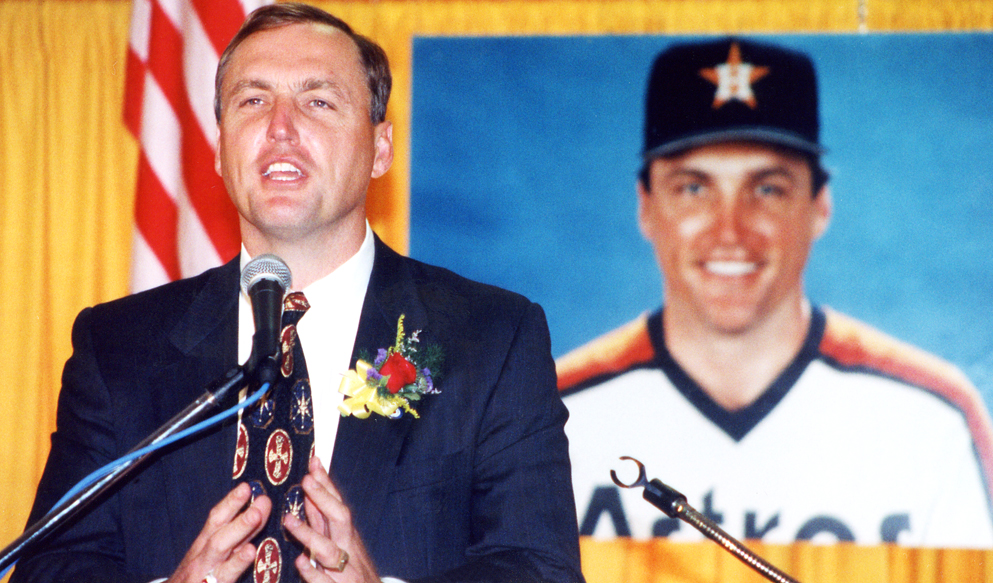
Terry Puhl at his induction into the Canadian Baseball Hall of Fame

No.	Date	Astros batter	Venue	Inning	Pitcher	Opposing team	Box
1	May 19 (Note: 1st MLB grand slam)	Tony Eusebio	Astrodome	7	Reid Cornelius	Montreal Expos	
2	June 28	Tony Eusebio	Astrodome	8	Jeff Parrett	St. Louis Cardinals	
3	September 5	Derrick May (Note: Pinch hitter)	Astrodome	7	Kevin Jarvis	Cincinnati Reds	

=== Career honors ===
- Canadian Baseball Hall of Fame inductee: Terry Puhl (In HOU: 1977—1990. 1× All-Star)

=== Annual awards ===
1995 Houston Astros award winners
Name of award		Recipient	Ref.
Associated Press (AP) All-Star	Second baseman	Craig Biggio	
Baseball Digest Rookie All-Star	Outfielder	Brian Hunter	
ESPY Award	Best Breakthrough Athlete	Jeff Bagwell	
ESPY Award	Best Major League Baseball Player	Jeff Bagwell	
Fred Hartman Award for Long and Meritorious Service to Baseball:		Larry Dierker	
Gold Glove Award	Second baseman	Craig Biggio	
Houston-Area Major League Player of the Year	SEA	Jay Buhner	
Houston Astros	Most Valuable Player (MVP)	Craig Biggio	
Houston Astros	Rookie of the Year	Brian Hunter	
MLB All-Star Game	Starting second baseman	Craig Biggio	
National League (NL) Player of the Week	May 21	Craig Biggio	
National League (NL) Player of the Week	July 2	Derek Bell	
National League (NL) Player of the Week	July 30	Doug Drabek	
Silver Slugger Award	Second baseman	Craig Biggio	
The Sporting News NL All-Star	Second baseman	Craig Biggio	
Topps All-Star Rookie Team	Shortstop:	Orlando Miller	

Other awards results

Name of award	Voting recipient(s) (Team)	Ref.
NL Manager of the Year	1st—Baylor (COL) • 4th—Collins (HOU)	
NL Most Valuable Player	1st—Larkin (CIN) • 10th—Biggio (HOU); Other Astros: 14th—Bell • 15th—Bagwell	
NL Rookie of the Year	1st—Nomo (LAD) • 7th—Hunter (HOU)	

=== League leaders ===
NL batting leaders

- Hit by pitch: Craig Biggio (22—led MLB)
- Plate appearances: Craig Biggio (673—led MLB)
- Runs scored: Craig Biggio (123—led MLB)

NL pitching leaders

- Games started: Doug Drabek (31)

NL fielding leaders

- Assists: Craig Biggio (419)

=== Milestones ===
==== Major League debuts ====
Player—Appeared at position

- Billy Wagner, relief pitcher
Date and opponent

- September 13 vs NYM
Box

Also:

== Minor league system ==
Level	Team	League	Manager
AAA	Tucson Toros	Pacific Coast League	Rick Sweet
AA	Jackson Generals	Texas League	Tim Tolman
A	Kissimmee Cobras	Florida State League	Dave Engle
A	Quad Cities River Bandits	Midwest League	Jim Pankovits
A-Short Season	Auburn Astros	New York–Penn League	Manny Acta
Rookie	GCL Astros	Gulf Coast League	Bobby Ramos

Awards

- Baseball America First Team Minor League All-Star—Starting pitcher: Donne Wall
- Houston Astros Minor League Player of the Year: Donne Wall, P
- Pacific Coast League All-Star:
  - Second baseman—Dave Hajek
  - Pitcher—Donne Wall
- Pacific Coast League Most Valuable Player (PCL MVP): Donne Wall, P
- Texas League All-Star—Pitcher: Billy Wagner
- Triple-A All-Star—Pitcher: Donne Wall

== See also ==
- List of Major League Baseball annual assists leaders
- List of Major League Baseball annual runs scored leaders
