= 1996 Houston Astros season =

35th season in Major League Baseball for the Houston Astros

1996 Houston Astros
- League: National League
- Division: Central
- Ballpark: The Astrodome
- City: Houston, Texas
- Record: 82–80 (.506)
- Divisional place: 2nd
- Owners: Drayton McLane, Jr.
- General managers: Gerry Hunsicker
- Managers: Terry Collins
- Television: KTXH; Prime Sports Southwest
- Radio: KILT (AM) (Bill Brown, Milo Hamilton, Larry Dierker, Vince Controneo, Bill Worrell); KXYZ (Francisco Ernesto Ruiz, Danny Gonzalez)

The 1996 Houston Astros season was the 35th season for the Houston Astros, a Major League Baseball (MLB) franchise located in Houston, Texas, their 32nd as the Astros, third in the NL Central division, and 32nd at The Astrodome. The Astros entered the season with a 76–68 record, in second-place and nine games behind the division-champion Cincinnati Reds, while having missed the playoffs by one game behind the Colorado Rockies in the NL Wild Card race.

On April 1, pitcher Shane Reynolds made his first of five consecutive Opening Day starts for the Astros, who hosted the Los Angeles Dodgers but were defeated, 4–3. In the amateur draft, the Astros selected pitcher Mark Johnson in the first round, at 19th overall, and pitcher Roy Oswalt in the 23rd round.

First baseman Jeff Bagwell and second baseman Craig Biggio represented the Astros for the National League at the MLB All-Star Game, the second for Bagwell, and fifth for Biggio. On September 29, the Astros retired Nolan Ryan's jersey number 34, where he pitched nine seasons.

The Astros finished in second place in the NL Central with an 82–80 record, six games behind the division-leading St. Louis Cardinals. In the NL Wild Card race, the Astros ranked third, eight games behind the Dodgers. This was the Astros' fourth consecutive winning season—unprecedented in club history—and third consecutive with a second-place finish in the division.

Following the season, Biggio won the Gold Glove Award, the third of his career, while relief pitcher Billy Wagner was selected to the Topps All-Star Rookie Team.

== Offseason ==
The Astros concluded the 1995 campaign with a final record of 76–68 (.528), for a second-place ranking in the National League (NL) Central division, 9 games behind the division-champion Cincinnati Reds. In the Wild Card chase, Houston finished as runners-up to the Colorado Rockies for the NL title by one game. Hence, for the second straight campaign, the club finished within one game of a playoff berth, having last qualified in 1986. For the fourth consecutive arc, since 1992, Houston had concluded with a record of at least .500—unprecedented in any prior instance in franchise history—while also matching the 1979, 1980, and 1981 clubs with three successive winning campaigns for longest string of winning seasons in franchise annals. The 1995 Astros also set club records for runs scored (747) and on-base percentage (.353 OBP), while posting the second-highest batting average to the 1994 squad (.278, .275). Moreover, second baseman Craig Biggio became the first Astro to be recognized with both the Silver Slugger and Gold Glove Awards in the same year on multiple occasions, and, the first Astro to win either award for the position at second base.

Prior to this season, the Astros hired former pitcher Brent Strom as a coach, his first coaching stint for the Astros.

- January 5, 1996: Anthony Young was signed as a free agent by the Astros.

== Regular season ==
=== Summary ===
==== April ====
Opening Day starting lineup
Uniform	Player	Position
19	Brian L. Hunter	Center fielder
7	Craig Biggio	Second baseman
5	Jeff Bagwell	First baseman
14	Derek Bell	Right fielder
16	Derrick May	Left fielder
17	Sean Berry	Third baseman
3	Rick Wilkins	Catcher
24	Orlando Miller	Shortstop
37	Shane Reynolds	Pitcher
Venue: Astrodome • Los Angeles 4, Houston 3 Sources:

The Astros hosted the Los Angeles Dodgers for Opening Day, April 1. Houston chose Shane Reynolds as the starting pitcher, while Los Angeles countered with Ramón Martínez. The Astros crossed the plate first as shortstop Orlando Miller singled in Sean Berry. Reynolds kept the Dodgers scoreless until the fifth, when Eric Karros singled home a run, and Todd Hollandsworth cleared the bases with a double. The Astros responded during the bottom of the sixth, when Jeff Bagwell led off with the club's first home run of the season, and Derrick May lifted a sacrifice fly which scored Derek Bell to reduce the Astros' deficit to 4–3. However, the score held as Reynolds took the defeat, while Martinez tossed a quality start to earn the victory.

On April 6, Ken Caminiti of the San Diego Padres, hit his second career grand slam at the Astrodome against his former team. He became just the eighth player to hit multiple grand slams in the Astrodome. It was a clutch blast for San Diego, breaking a 4–4 tie in the top of the 13th inning. The Padres maintained the edge, winning 8–4.

==== May ====
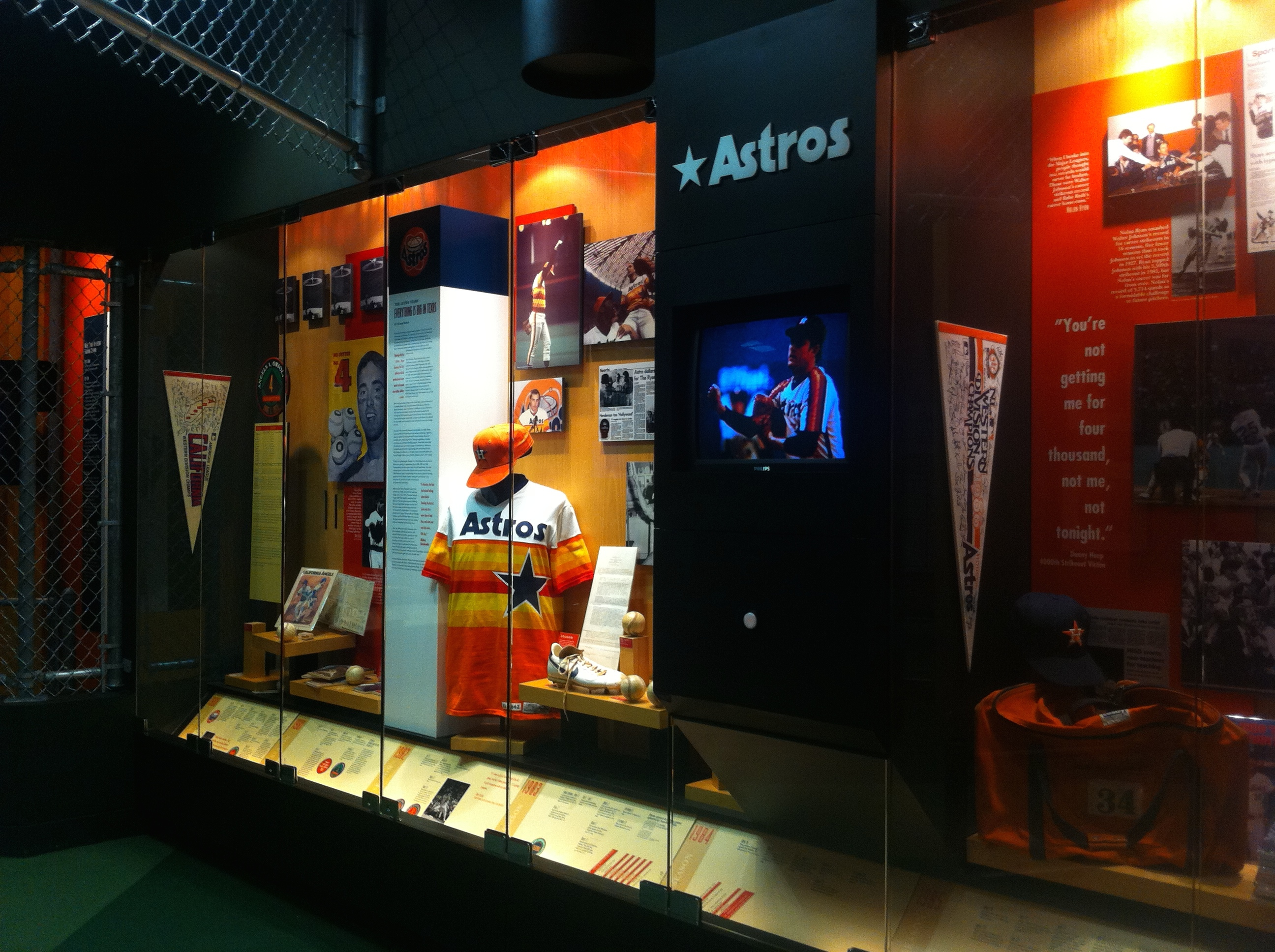
The Nolan Ryan Exhibit Center in Alvin, Texas.

On May 7 against Philadelphia, Jeff Bagwell reached the 500th run batted in (RBI) of his career with two home runs and four RBI. By hitting his second upper-deck home run at Three Rivers Stadium on May 29 – it travelled 459 feet (140 m) – Bagwell joined longtime Pirate Willie Stargell as the only players to homer twice into the stadium's upper deck.

Backup catcher Jerry Goff set a National League record and matched the MLB record on May 12 with six passed balls, tying Geno Petralli and Rube Vickers. Goff's miscues led to five unearned runs, allowing the Montreal Expos to defeat Houston, 7–6. At the plate, Goff homered and collected two hits; however, in spite of his strong offensive performance, the Astros optioned him to the Triple-A Tucson Toros following the game. This turned out to be his last appearance in the major leagues.

On May 24, Craig Biggio's two-run, ninth-inning blast tied the game and sent it into extra innings. Later, Astros outfielder John Cangelosi stroked a 10th-inning RBI single to finish off the Chicago Cubs for the 8–7 win.

For the month of May, Bagwell batted .360 with .740 SLG, 10 HR, 31 RBI, scored 22 runs, and stole four bases. He was named NL Player of the Month, his fourth career monthly award.

==== June ====
On June 6, southpaw Billy Wagner notched a three-inning bout for the first time, going 3 1/3 total frames while surrendering three runs. Wagner struck out five.

On June 13, Sean Berry hit his second career grand slam, also his second as a pinch hitter. He hit it during the fifth off Mark Leiter of the San Francisco Giants, cutting to 3–9 deficit to 7–9. Houston scored again in the top of the sixth inning to bring the score within one, but that was as close they came. The Giants scored thrice more to win, 12–9.

On June 14, Bagwell tied a major league record with four doubles in one game against the Giants. Bagwell's achievement was the first in the major leagues since former Astro Billy Hatcher on August 21, 1990, then as a member of the Cincinnati Reds. He joined Kevin Bass on June 27, 1987, as the second Houston Astro to slug four extra-base hits in a single game, also punishing San Francisco Giants pitching. (Note: The next Astro with four extra-bas hits in one game was Jose Altuve, on May 17, 2017. Criteria: For single games, playing for HOU, in the regular season, requiring extra base hits ≥ 4, sorted by descending date.) Craig Biggio went deep and plated three, while Brian Hunter doubled and drove in three. Mike Hampton (5–3) tossed six sturdy innings while Billy Wagner closed out the final three frames for his first career save. Billy "The Kid" whiffed four of nine batters faced.

Billy Wagner whiffed a career-best seven on June 20, accounting for seven of eight total outs in an appearance of 2 2/3 innings. Wagner diffused two bases on balls and one safety with no runs surrendered.

On June 25, Sean Berry hit a second grand slam in less than two weeks, at the time, tying a team record with two grand slams in one season. (Note: In 2016, George Springer became the first Astro to hit three grand slams in one season.) Moreover, he became just the third Colt .45s/Astros player to hit two within a calendar month, succeeding Bob Aspromonte, (twice, in June 1964 and August 1966) and Bob Watson (September 1970). (Note: Two grand slams in one month remained the team record until Alex Bregman hit three in June 2023.) It was Berry's third career grand slam and second against the Padres.

==== July ====
On July 24, pinch hitter Ray Montgomery connected for a tenth-inning walk-off home run off Ron Villone of the San Diego Padres, also scoring Ricky Gutiérrez. (Note: HOU: 3 home runs in 1996—walk-off) This was also Montgomery's first and only major league blast. James Mouton also went deep among three hits. The final score was Houston 6, San Diego 4.

During the month of July, Houston claimed five triumphs via walk-off safeties.

==== September ====
With one month remaining in the season, the Astros held a 2 1/2-game lead over the St. Louis Cardinals.

However, the Astros lost 17 of their final 25 games—including a season-high nine-game losing streak—and wound up losing the division lead, ultimately landing in second place and six games behind the first-place Cardinals. The Astros dismissed manager Terry Collins following the season.

==== Retirement of Nolan Ryan's uniform number 34 ====
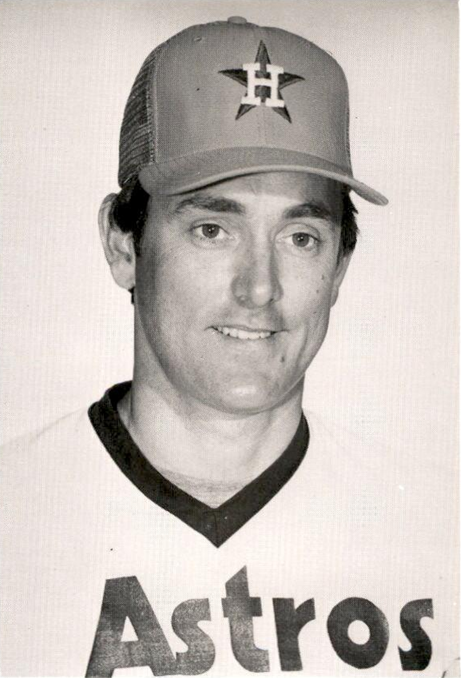
Houston Astros 1982 postcard of Nolan Ryan.

During a pre-game ceremony on September 29, 1996—the final day of the regular season—the Astros retired Nolan Ryan's jersey number 34. During his tenure in Houston, the "Ryan Express" became the fourth major league pitcher to notch his 3,000th strikeout (July 4, 1980), the first to whiff each of 4,000 (July 11, 1985) and 4,500 batters (September 9, 1987), tossed his record fifth no-hitter (September 25, 1981), and earned his 250th career victory (August 27, 1986).

In 282 games started with Astros, Ryan went 106–94 with a 3.13 earned run average (ERA), gaining two All-Star team selections while claiming two each of league ERA titles (1.69 in 1981, 2.76 in 1987) and strikeout titles (270 in 1987, 228 in 1988). Ryan became the first Astro to earn multiple ERA titles, and just the second to lead in strikeouts multiple seasons, following J. R. Richard. Ryan departed Houston as the Astros' career record holder for strikeouts (1,866), for most 10-K games with 53, as well having tossed the third 16-strikeout game in franchise history (September 9, 1987).

Ryan became the second major leaguer to have his jersey number retired by three teams on which they played, joining Frank Robinson.

To cap off the contest, catcher Tony Eusebio lined a double to left field to score James Mouton for a walk-off, 5–4 decision in ten innings over the Florida Marlins. This brought Houston to a winning record for the campaign at 82–80.

==== Performance overview ====
With a final record of 82–80, the Astros increased their win total by six from the year prior, while their winning percentage dropped 0.022 points, a season shortened by a players' strike to 144 games. After their late-season collapse, the Astros produced a fifth consecutive season since 1992 with a record of at least .500—unprecedented in franchise history. The 1996 team was the fourth consecutive with a winning record, surpassing the 1979, 1980, 1981 clubs which set the prior record with three successive winning campaigns. The Astros maintained their consistency and extended this new record through the 1999 campaign.

The Astros hoisted 12 victories via walk-off hit to lead the Major Leagues, and their most since 1992. Derek Bell led the club with three (April 2, July 20, and July 21). Meanwhile, Orlando Miller swatted two of Houston's three walk-off home runs, and was one of eight players in the Major Leagues to hit multiple such home runs. (Note: All: 64 home runs in 1996—walk-off)

Jeff Bagwell recorded the first of six successive campaigns of each of 100 runs scored, 30 doubles, 30 home runs, 100 RBI and 100 BB, through 2001, a Major League record. (Note: Just four other players had produced six or more total seasons meeting each of the criteria: Lou Gehrig (8); and Babe Ruth, Ted Williams, and Barry Bonds (6 each). Filtered for: Number of seasons player meets criteria, in the regular season: Requiring runs ≥ 100, doubles ≥ 30, home runs ≥ 30, runs batted in ≥ 100 and bases on balls ≥ 100, sorted by descending instances.) Bagwell connected for 31 homers, while establishing single-season club records with 48 doubles and 120 RBI. Derek Bell, who drove home 113 runs, joined Bagwell to generate the first instance in which the club rostered multiple hitters with 100-plus RBI during the same season.

Starting pitchers Shane Reynolds and Darryl Kile both struck out upward of 200 batters. It was the third season in franchise history that the Astros boasted at least two such hurlers (1969, 1987). (Note: Number of players that meet criteria in a season for a team, playing for HOU, in the regular season, requiring strikeouts ≥ 200, sorted by descending instances.)

Biggio was recognized with the Gold Glove Award at second base for the third consecutive year. Among Astros Gold Glove winners, only César Cedeño and Doug Rader had won more (5 each, both consecutively).

=== Season standings ===
NL Central
Team	W	L	Pct.	GB	Home	Road
St. Louis Cardinals	88	74	.543	—	48‍–‍33	40‍–‍41
Houston Astros	82	80	.506	6	48‍–‍33	34‍–‍47
Cincinnati Reds	81	81	.500	7	46‍–‍35	35‍–‍46
Chicago Cubs	76	86	.469	12	43‍–‍38	33‍–‍48
Pittsburgh Pirates	73	89	.451	15	36‍–‍44	37‍–‍45

=== Record vs. opponents ===
1996 National League record Source: MLB Standings Grid – 1996
Team	ATL	CHC	CIN	COL	FLA	HOU	LAD	MON	NYM	PHI	PIT	SD	SF	STL
Atlanta	—	7–5	7–5	5–7	6–7	6–6	5–7	10–3	7–6	9–4	9–3	9–4	7–5	9–4
Chicago	5–7	—	5–8	5–7	6–6	5–8	8–5	6–6	7–5	7–6	4–9	6–6	7–5	5–8
Cincinnati	5–7	8–5	—	7–6	3–9	7–6	4–8	3–9	6–6	10–2	5–8	9–3	9–4	5–8
Colorado	7–5	7–5	6–7	—	5–8	8–5	6–7	3–9	7–5	6–6	7–5	8–5	5–8	8–4
Florida	7–6	6–6	9–3	8–5	—	7–5	6–7	5–8	7–6	6–7	5–7	3–9	5–7	6–6
Houston	6–6	8–5	6–7	5–8	5–7	—	6–6	4–9	8–4	10–2	8–5	6–6	8–4	2–11
Los Angeles	7–5	5–8	8–4	7–6	7–6	6–6	—	9–3	8–4	7–6	6–6	5–8	7–6	8–4
Montreal	3–10	6–6	9–3	9–3	8–5	9–4	3–9	—	7–6	6–7	7–5	4–8	9–4	8–4
New York	6–7	5–7	6–6	5–7	6–7	4–8	4–8	6–7	—	7–6	8–5	3–10	6–6	5–7
Philadelphia	4–9	6–7	2–10	6–6	7–6	2–10	6–7	7–6	6–7	—	7–5	4–8	6–6	4–8
Pittsburgh	3–9	9–4	8–5	5–7	7–5	5–8	6–6	5–7	5–8	5–7	—	4–9	8–4	3–10
San Diego	4–9	6–6	3–9	5–8	9–3	6–6	8–5	8–4	10–3	8–4	9–4	—	11–2	4–8
San Francisco	5–7	5–7	4–9	8–5	7–5	4–8	6–7	4–9	6–6	6–6	4–8	2–11	—	7–6
St. Louis	4–9	8–5	8–5	4–8	6–6	11–2	4–8	4–8	7–5	8–4	10–3	8–4	6–7	—

=== Game log ===
1996 Game Log: 82–80 (Home: 48–33; Away: 34–47)
April: 13–14 (Home: 5–8; Away: 8–6)

#	Date	Opponent	Score	Win	Loss	Save	Attendance	Record
1	April 1	Dodgers	3–4	Martinez	**Reynolds** (0–1)	Worrell	34,375	0–1
2	April 2	Dodgers	5–4	**Jones** (1–0)	Cummings	—	20,492	1–1
3	April 3	Dodgers	5–2	**Hampton** (1–0)	Nomo	**Jones** (1)	14,858	2–1
4	April 5	Padres	4–10	Tewksbury	**Kile** (0–1)	—	28,629	2–2
5	April 6	Padres	4–8 (13)	Hoffman	**Small** (0–1)	—	24,510	2–3
6	April 7	Padres	2–17	Bergman	**Swindell** (0–1)	—	16,258	2–4
7	April 8	Giants	6–2	**Hampton** (2–0)	VanLandingham	—	13,488	3–4
8	April 9	Giants	1–3 (10)	Juden	**Tabaka** (0–1)	Beck	13,588	3–5
9	April 10	Giants	5–11	Fernandez	**Kile** (0–2)	—	14,183	3–6
10	April 11	@ Reds	9–4	**Reynolds** (1–1)	Portugal	—	18,946	4–6
11	April 12	@ Reds	10–8 (10)	**Jones** (2–0)	Moore	**Tabaka** (1)	24,960	5–6
12	April 14	@ Reds	3–5	Schourek	**Hampton** (2–1)	Brantley	—	5–7
13	April 14	@ Reds	8–9	Shaw	**Young** (0–1)	Brantley	21,552	5–8
14	April 16	@ Mets	9–6	**Reynolds** (2–1)	Isringhausen	**Jones** (2)	13,795	6–8
15	April 17	@ Mets	7–5	**Kile** (1–2)	Wilson	**Jones** (3)	12,065	7–8
16	April 19	Reds	13–5	**Brocail** (1–0)	Schourek	—	22,728	8–8
17	April 20	Reds	1–6	Smiley	**Drabek** (0–1)	—	34,098	8–9
18	April 21	Reds	7–5	**Jones** (3–0)	Brantley	—	27,845	9–9
19	April 22	@ Giants	11–8	**Reynolds** (3–1)	Leiter	—	8,867	10–9
20	April 23	@ Giants	8–4	**Kile** (2–2)	VanLandingham	—	8,439	11–9
21	April 24	@ Dodgers	2–5	Valdez	**Brocail** (1–1)	—	26,666	11–10
22	April 25	@ Dodgers	4–6	Nomo	**Drabek** (0–2)	Worrell	33,530	11–11
23	April 26	@ Padres	2–3	Worrell	**Hampton** (2–2)	Hoffman	21,254	11–12
24	April 27	@ Padres	6–0	**Reynolds** (4–1)	Ashby	—	38,309	12–12
25	April 28	@ Padres	3–2	**Kile** (3–2)	Bergman	**Jones** (4)	27,208	13–12
26	April 29	@ Padres	0–2	Hamilton	**Brocail** (1–2)	—	8,979	13–13
27	April 30	Braves	5–7	Smoltz	**Jones** (3–1)	McMichael	17,795	13–14

May: 14–14 (Home: 7–6; Away: 7–8)

#	Date	Opponent	Score	Win	Loss	Save	Attendance	Record
28	May 1	Braves	3–0	**Hampton** (3–2)	Avery	—	18,546	14–14
29	May 3	Expos	4–1	**Reynolds** (5–1)	Cormier	**Jones** (5)	19,633	15–14
30	May 4	Expos	1–2	Veres	**Hernandez** (0–1)	Rojas	22,810	15–15
31	May 5	Expos	0–5	Fassero	**Brocail** (1–3)	—	25,207	15–16
32	May 6	@ Phillies	11–5	**Drabek** (1–2)	Hunter	—	15,906	16–16
33	May 7	@ Phillies	7–5	**Young** (1–1)	Springer	**Jones** (6)	16,569	17–16
34	May 8	@ Phillies	1–2 (10)	Ryan	**Tabaka** (0–2)	—	16,284	17–17
35	May 9	@ Expos	11–4	**Kile** (4–2)	Rueter	—	12,470	18–17
36	May 10	@ Expos	2–5	Fassero	**Dougherty** (0–1)	Rojas	30,315	18–18
37	May 11	@ Expos	9–10 (13)	Dyer	**Dougherty** (0–2)	—	26,084	18–19
38	May 12	@ Expos	6–7	Urbina	**Hampton** (3–3)	Rojas	19,345	18–20
39	May 13	@ Cubs	0–6	Trachsel	**Reynolds** (5–2)	—	22,610	18–21
40	May 14	@ Cubs	6–3	**Kile** (5–2)	Navarro	**Jones** (7)	17,562	19–21
41	May 15	@ Cubs	7–5	**Wall** (1–0)	Castillo	**Jones** (8)	16,093	20–21
42	May 16	@ Cubs	1–13	Telemaco	**Drabek** (1–3)	—	15,902	20–22
43	May 17	Pirates	4–2	**Reynolds** (6–2)	Lieber	**Jones** (9)	22,882	21–22
44	May 18	Pirates	1–2 (11)	Cordova	**Young** (1–2)	Plesac	21,010	21–23
45	May 19	Pirates	4–3	**Jones** (4–1)	Lieber	—	18,815	22–23
46	May 20	Cardinals	3–5	Osborne	**Drabek** (1–4)	—	14,547	22–24
47	May 21	Cardinals	2–8	Stottlemyre	**Reynolds** (6–3)	—	17,935	22–25
48	May 22	Cardinals	2–5	Benes	**Kile** (5–3)	Mathews	15,353	22–26
49	May 24	Cubs	8–7 (10)	**Jones** (5–1)	Patterson	—	23,910	23–26
50	May 25	Cubs	5–2	**Drabek** (2–4)	Navarro	**Jones** (10)	34,326	24–26
51	May 26	Cubs	7–2	**Reynolds** (7–3)	Castillo	—	33,245	25–26
52	May 27	@ Pirates	5–3	**Kile** (6–3)	Smith	—	8,906	26–26
53	May 28	@ Pirates	5–6	Miceli	**Swindell** (0–2)	Cordova	7,182	26–27
54	May 29	@ Pirates	7–4	**Morman** (1–0)	Darwin	**Jones** (11)	11,679	27–27
55	May 31	@ Cardinals	4–6	Osborne	**Swindell** (0–3)	Fossas	37,625	27–28

June: 15–12 (Home: 8–4; Away: 7–8)

#	Date	Opponent	Score	Win	Loss	Save	Attendance	Record
56	June 1	@ Cardinals	4–5 (10)	Bailey	**Hernandez** (0–2)	—	34,958	27–29
57	June 2	@ Cardinals	0–2	Stottlemyre	**Kile** (6–4)	—	32,703	27–30
58	June 4	Rockies	16–8	**Hampton** (4–3)	Thompson	—	18,418	28–30
59	June 5	Rockies	4–1	**Wall** (2–0)	Reynoso	—	14,954	29–30
60	June 6	Rockies	7–14	Ritz	**Drabek** (2–5)	—	22,112	29–31
61	June 7	Phillies	11–5	**Reynolds** (8–3)	Crawford	—	22,585	30–31
62	June 8	Phillies	7–3	**Wagner** (1–0)	Springer	—	23,739	31–31
63	June 9	Phillies	2–1	**Young** (2–2)	Williams	**Jones** (12)	30,180	32–31
64	June 10	@ Rockies	10–9	**Wall** (3–0)	Reynoso	—	48,007	33–31
65	June 11	@ Rockies	5–7	Alston	**Young** (2–3)	Ruffin	48,014	33–32
66	June 12	@ Rockies	0–8	Freeman	**Reynolds** (8–4)	—	48,024	33–33
67	June 13	@ Giants	8–12	Leiter	**Kile** (6–5)	—	10,527	33–34
68	June 14	@ Giants	9–1	**Hampton** (5–3)	VanLandingham	**Wagner** (1)	10,758	34–34
69	June 15	@ Giants	4–3	**Wall** (4–0)	Watson	**Jones** (13)	18,530	35–34
70	June 16	@ Giants	7–8	DeLucia	**Morman** (1–1)	—	27,624	35–35
71	June 17	Reds	5–4	**Young** (3–3)	Shaw	**Jones** (14)	24,977	36–35
72	June 18	Reds	4–6 (10)	Brantley	**Hernandez** (0–3)	—	20,505	36–36
73	June 19	Reds	7–10	Portugal	**Hampton** (5–4)	Brantley	38,218	36–37
74	June 20	@ Dodgers	4–2	**Wall** (5–0)	Nomo	**Jones** (15)	49,656	37–37
75	June 21	@ Dodgers	11–3	**Drabek** (3–5)	Candiotti	—	33,273	38–37
76	June 22	@ Dodgers	0–3	Martinez	**Reynolds** (8–5)	—	37,844	38–38
77	June 23	@ Dodgers	3–4	Worrell	**Hernandez** (0–4)	—	35,467	38–39
78	June 25	@ Padres	9–4	**Jones** (6–1)	Sanders	—	13,458	39–39
79	June 26	@ Padres	4–3	**Wall** (6–0)	Worrell	**Wagner** (2)	12,388	40–39
80	June 28	Mets	2–7	Clark	**Drabek** (3–6)	Henry	24,569	40–40
81	June 29	Mets	9–1	**Reynolds** (9–5)	Person	—	35,454	41–40
82	June 30	Mets	9–3	**Kile** (7–5)	Isringhausen	—	35,981	42–40

July: 15–12 (Home: 10–3; Away: 5–9)

#	Date	Opponent	Score	Win	Loss	Save	Attendance	Record
83	July 1	Marlins	6–2	**Hampton** (6–4)	Brown	—	18,513	43–40
84	July 2	Marlins	4–3 (12)	**Johnstone** (1–0)	Mathews	—	18,897	44–40
85	July 3	Marlins	4–3	**Drabek** (4–6)	Leiter	**Jones** (16)	24,537	45–40
86	July 4	@ Braves	5–2	**Reynolds** (10–5)	Smoltz	**Hernandez** (1)	49,060	46–40
87	July 5	@ Braves	7–1	**Kile** (8–5)	Schmidt	—	36,896	47–40
88	July 6	@ Braves	2–4	Bielecki	**Hampton** (6–5)	—	41,619	47–41
89	July 7	@ Braves	1–9	Maddux	**Wall** (6–1)	—	28,716	47–42
90	July 11	@ Mets	2–8	Clark	**Drabek** (4–7)	—	18,557	47–43
91	July 12	@ Mets	3–1	**Reynolds** (11–5)	Jones	**Wagner** (3)	17,405	48–43
92	July 14	@ Mets	7–5 (11)	**Hernandez** (1–4)	Mlicki	**Jones** (17)	—	49–43
93	July 14	@ Mets	3–10	Harnisch	**Hampton** (6–6)	—	33,505	49–44
94	July 15	@ Marlins	5–15	Pall	**Wall** (6–2)	—	15,807	49–45
95	July 16	@ Marlins	2–3	Perez	**Jones** (6–2)	—	15,610	49–46
96	July 17	@ Marlins	2–11	Leiter	**Reynolds** (11–6)	—	16,345	49–47
97	July 18	Braves	2–3	Smoltz	**Jones** (6–3)	Wohlers	35,822	49–48
98	July 19	Braves	7–6	**Kile** (9–5)	Woodall	**Wagner** (4)	39,090	50–48
99	July 20	Braves	2–1	**Wagner** (2–0)	Maddux	—	49,674	51–48
100	July 21	Braves	4–3 (10)	**Hernandez** (2–4)	McMichael	—	45,561	52–48
101	July 22	Padres	1–0	**Reynolds** (12–6)	Hamilton	**Wagner** (5)	21,563	53–48
102	July 23	Padres	4–7	Sanders	**Hampton** (6–7)	Hoffman	19,620	53–49
103	July 24	Padres	6–4 (10)	**Hernandez** (3–4)	Villone	—	19,168	54–49
104	July 26	Dodgers	4–3	**Darwin** (1–0)	Guthrie	**Wagner** (6)	27,089	55–49
105	July 27	Dodgers	5–6 (11)	Osuna	**Clark** (0–1)	Worrell	36,841	55–50
106	July 28	Dodgers	3–2	**Darwin** (2–0)	Eischen	—	32,912	56–50
107	July 29	@ Reds	2–1	**Hampton** (7–7)	Portugal	**Wagner** (7)	22,163	57–50
108	July 30	@ Reds	4–5 (10)	Shaw	**Clark** (0–2)	—	27,015	57–51
109	July 31	@ Reds	0–10	Smiley	**Wall** (6–3)	—	26,082	57–52

August: 17–11 (Home: 10–7; Away: 7–4)

#	Date	Opponent	Score	Win	Loss	Save	Attendance	Record
110	August 2	Giants	5–1	**Drabek** (5–7)	Gardner	**Hernandez** (2)	22,682	58–52
111	August 3	Giants	4–1	**Reynolds** (13–6)	Estes	—	35,930	59–52
112	August 4	Giants	7–6	**Hampton** (8–7)	Fernandez	**Wagner** (8)	33,646	60–52
113	August 6	Expos	5–7	Fassero	**Kile** (9–6)	Rojas	17,658	60–53
114	August 7	Expos	5–13	Leiter	**Wall** (6–4)	—	19,703	60–54
115	August 8	Expos	6–2	**Drabek** (6–7)	Martinez	—	26,632	61–54
116	August 9	@ Phillies	5–1	**Reynolds** (14–6)	West	—	21,780	62–54
117	August 10	@ Phillies	3–1	**Hampton** (9–7)	Schilling	**Wagner** (9)	18,486	63–54
118	August 11	@ Phillies	10–5	**Kile** (10–6)	Williams	—	24,150	64–54
119	August 12	@ Expos	1–8	Leiter	**Darwin** (2–1)	—	35,458	64–55
120	August 13	@ Expos	4–7	Martinez	**Drabek** (6–8)	Rojas	17,103	64–56
121	August 14	@ Expos	8–3	**Reynolds** (15–6)	Cormier	—	19,136	65–56
122	August 16	@ Cubs	8–3	**Hampton** (10–7)	Castillo	—	37,139	66–56
123	August 17	@ Cubs	3–12	Trachsel	**Kile** (10–7)	—	39,775	66–57
124	August 18	@ Cubs	8–10	Navarro	**Brocail** (1–4)	Wendell	37,210	66–58
125	August 19	Pirates	2–1 (13)	**Morman** (2–1)	Morel	—	15,067	67–58
126	August 20	Pirates	9–4	**Wall** (7–4)	Miceli	**Hernandez** (3)	19,866	68–58
127	August 21	Pirates	2–5	Neagle	**Hampton** (10–8)	Ericks	13,357	68–59
128	August 22	Pirates	6–8	Wilkins	**Wagner** (2–1)	Ericks	14,899	68–60
129	August 23	Cardinals	0–1	Osborne	**Kile** (10–8)	Eckersley	35,554	68–61
130	August 24	Cardinals	3–1	**Reynolds** (16–6)	Stottlemyre	—	43,258	69–61
131	August 25	Cardinals	4–1	**Wall** (8–4)	Benes	**Hernandez** (4)	31,609	70–61
132	August 26	Cardinals	2–3	Benes	**Hampton** (10–9)	Eckersley	21,624	70–62
133	August 27	Cubs	6–5	**Morman** (3–1)	Adams	**Hernandez** (5)	15,374	71–62
134	August 28	Cubs	5–4	**Olson** (1–0)	Bottenfield	—	18,026	72–62
135	August 29	Cubs	3–4	Navarro	**Reynolds** (16–7)	Wendell	16,151	72–63
136	August 30	@ Pirates	10–0	**Wall** (9–4)	Peters	—	24,619	73–63
137	August 31	@ Pirates	5–4	**Hernandez** (4–4)	Ericks	**Hudek** (1)	27,559	74–63

September: 8–17 (Home: 8–5; Away: 0–12)

#	Date	Opponent	Score	Win	Loss	Save	Attendance	Record
138	September 1	@ Pirates	5–9	Wainhouse	**Darwin** (2–2)	—	14,144	74–64
139	September 2	@ Cardinals	7–8 (10)	Benes	**Brocail** (1–5)	—	32,955	74–65
140	September 3	@ Cardinals	3–12	Stottlemyre	**Reynolds** (16–8)	—	23,955	74–66
141	September 4	@ Cardinals	4–6	Benes	**Wall** (9–5)	Eckersley	34,891	74–67
142	September 6	Rockies	2–1	**Hernandez** (5–4)	Leskanic	—	20,932	75–67
143	September 7	Rockies	5–4	**Kile** (11–8)	Holmes	**Hudek** (2)	37,213	76–67
144	September 8	Rockies	2–5	Reed	**Reynolds** (16–9)	Ruffin	31,316	76–68
145	September 9	Rockies	2–4	Ritz	**Wall** (9–6)	Ruffin	13,833	76–69
146	September 10	Phillies	4–3	**Morman** (4–1)	Schilling	**Hernandez** (6)	12,700	77–69
147	September 11	Phillies	8–10	Parrett	**Holt** (0–1)	Bottalico	17,300	77–70
148	September 12	Phillies	4–1	**Kile** (12–8)	Williams	—	16,103	78–70
149	September 13	@ Rockies	3–6	Holmes	**Hernandez** (5–5)	Ruffin	48,049	78–71
150	September 14	@ Rockies	3–7	Ritz	**Wall** (9–7)	—	48,132	78–72
151	September 15	@ Rockies	4–11	Thompson	**Drabek** (6–9)	—	48,038	78–73
152	September 17	@ Braves	4–5	Smoltz	**Kile** (12–9)	Wohlers	32,109	78–74
153	September 18	@ Braves	2–6	Maddux	**Hampton** (10–10)	—	29,885	78–75
154	September 20	@ Marlins	1–3	Brown	**Reynolds** (16–10)	Nen	21,518	78–76
155	September 21	@ Marlins	1–2	Heredia	**Wagner** (2–2)	—	31,023	78–77
156	September 22	@ Marlins	0–6	Helling	**Kile** (12–10)	—	17,461	78–78
157	September 24	Mets	0–4	Jones	**Wall** (9–8)	—	39,511	78–79
158	September 25	Mets	5–4 (10)	**Hudek** (1–0)	Wallace	—	15,760	79–79
159	September 26	Mets	6–2	**Drabek** (7–9)	Trlicek	—	13,751	80–79
160	September 27	Marlins	2–3	Hutton	**Kile** (12–11)	Nen	21,725	80–80
161	September 28	Marlins	5–1	**Darwin** (3–2)	Heredia	—	21,832	81–80
162	September 29	Marlins	5–4 (10)	**Hudek** (2–0)	Hammond	—	42,658	82–80

Legend: = Win = Loss
Bold = Astros team member

=== Detailed records ===
National League
Opponent	W	L	WP	RS	RA
NL East
Atlanta Braves	6	6	0.500	44	47
Florida Marlins	5	7	0.417	37	56
Montreal Expos	4	9	0.308	62	74
New York Mets	8	4	0.667	62	56
Philadelphia Phillies	10	2	0.833	73	42
Total	33	28	0.541	278	275
NL Central
Chicago Cubs	8	5	0.615	67	76
Cincinnati Reds	6	7	0.462	73	78
**Houston Astros**					
Pittsburgh Pirates	8	5	0.615	65	51
St. Louis Cardinals	2	11	0.154	38	63
Total	24	28	0.462	243	268
NL West
Colorado Rockies	5	8	0.385	63	85
Los Angeles Dodgers	6	6	0.500	49	44
San Diego Padres	6	6	0.500	45	60
San Francisco Giants	8	4	0.667	75	60
Total	25	24	0.510	232	249
Season Total	82	80	0.506	753	792

Month	Games	Won	Lost	Win %	RS	RA
April	27	13	14	0.481	143	151
May	28	14	14	0.500	126	128
June	27	15	12	0.556	161	137
July	27	15	12	0.556	97	128
August	28	17	11	0.607	139	121
September	25	8	17	0.320	87	127
Total	162	82	80	0.506	753	792

	Games	Won	Lost	Win %	RS	RA
Home	81	48	33	0.593	364	347
Away	81	34	47	0.420	389	445
Total	162	82	80	0.506	753	792

=== Notable transactions ===
- June 3, 1996: Greg Swindell was released by the Astros.
- July 23, 1996: Rich Loiselle was traded by the Astros to the Pittsburgh Pirates for Danny Darwin.
- July 27, 1996: Rick Wilkins and cash were traded by the Astros to the San Francisco Giants for Kirt Manwaring.

=== Roster ===
1996 Houston Astros
**Roster**
**Pitchers**: 46 Doug Brocail; 52 Terry Clark; 44 Danny Darwin; 49 Jim Dougherty; 15 Doug Drabek; 10 Mike Hampton; 58 Dean Hartgraves; 31 Xavier Hernandez; 45 Chris Holt; 35 John Hudek; 39 John Johnstone; 59 Todd Jones; 57 Darryl Kile; 51 Alvin Morman; 30 Gregg Olson; 37 Shane Reynolds; 36 Mark Small; 21 Greg Swindell; 31,41 Jeff Tabaka; 13 Billy Wagner; 56 Donne Wall; 22,99 Anthony Young	**Catchers**: 20 Tony Eusebio; 9 Jerry Goff; 9 Randy Knorr; 3 Kirt Manwaring; 3 Rick Wilkins; **Infielders**: 5 Jeff Bagwell; 17 Sean Berry; 7 Craig Biggio; 22 Andújar Cedeño; 12 Ricky Gutiérrez; 4,30 Dave Hajek; 24 Orlando Miller; 28 Bill Spiers	**Outfielders**: 29 Bobby Abreu; 14 Derek Bell; 27 John Cangelosi; 19 Brian Hunter; 16 Derrick May; 21 Ray Montgomery; 6 James Mouton; 23 Mike Simms	**Manager**: 2 Terry Collins; **Coaches**: 48 Matt Galante (third base); 55 Steve Henderson (hitting); 1 Julio Linares (bench); 42 Brent Strom (pitching); 18 Rick Sweet (first base)

== Player stats ==
=== Batting ===
==== Starters by position ====
Note: Pos = Position; G = Games played; AB = At bats; H = Hits; Avg. = Batting average; HR = Home runs; RBI = Runs batted in

Pos	Player	G	AB	H	Avg.	HR	RBI
C	Rick Wilkins	84	254	54	.213	6	23
1B	Jeff Bagwell	162	568	179	.315	31	120
2B	Craig Biggio	162	605	174	.288	15	75
SS	Orlando Miller	139	468	120	.256	15	58
3B	Sean Berry	132	431	121	.281	17	95
LF	Derrick May	109	259	65	.251	5	33
CF	Brian Hunter	132	526	145	.276	5	35
RF	Derek Bell	158	627	165	.263	17	113

==== Other batters ====
Note: G = Games played; AB = At bats; H = Hits; Avg. = Batting average; HR = Home runs; RBI = Runs batted in

Player	G	AB	H	Avg.	HR	RBI
James Mouton	122	300	79	.263	3	34
John Cangelosi	108	262	69	.263	1	16
Ricky Gutiérrez	89	218	62	.284	1	15
Bill Spiers	122	218	55	.252	6	26
Tony Eusebio	58	152	41	.270	1	19
Randy Knorr	37	87	17	.195	1	7
Kurt Manwaring	37	82	18	.220	0	4
Mike Simms	49	68	12	.176	1	8
Bobby Abreu	15	22	5	.227	0	1
Ray Montgomery	12	14	3	.214	1	4
Dave Hajek	8	10	3	.300	0	0
Jerry Goff	1	4	2	.500	1	2
Andújar Cedeño	3	2	0	.000	0	0

=== Pitching ===
==== Starting pitchers ====
Note: G = Games pitched; IP = Innings pitched; W = Wins; L = Losses; ERA = Earned run average; SO = Strikeouts

Player	G	IP	W	L	ERA	SO
Shane Reynolds	35	239.0	16	10	3.65	204
Darryl Kile	35	219.0	12	11	4.19	219
Doug Drabek	30	175.1	7	9	4.57	137
Mike Hampton	27	160.1	10	10	3.59	101
Donne Wall	26	150.0	9	8	4.56	99

==== Other pitchers ====
Note: G = Games pitched; IP = Innings pitched; W = Wins; L = Losses; ERA = Earned run average; SO = Strikeouts

Player	G	IP	W	L	ERA	SO
Doug Brocail	23	53.0	1	5	4.58	34
Danny Darwin	15	42.1	3	2	5.95	27
Greg Swindell	8	23.0	0	3	7.83	15

==== Relief pitchers ====
Note: G = Games pitched; W = Wins; L = Losses; SV = Saves; ERA = Earned run average; SO = Strikeouts

Player	G	W	L	SV	ERA	SO
Todd Jones	51	6	3	17	4.40	44
Xavier Hernandez	58	5	5	6	4.22	78
Alvin Morman	53	4	1	0	4.93	31
Billy Wagner	37	2	2	9	2.44	67
Anthony Young	28	3	3	0	4.59	19
Dean Hartgraves	19	0	0	0	5.21	16
Jeff Tabaka	18	0	2	1	6.64	18
Mark Small	16	0	1	0	5.92	16
John Hudek	15	2	0	2	2.31	14
Jim Dougherty	12	0	2	0	9.00	6
John Johnstone	9	1	0	0	5.54	5
Gregg Olson	9	1	0	0	4.82	8
Terry Clark	5	0	2	0	11.37	5
Chris Holt	4	0	1	0	5.79	0

== Major League Baseball draft ==
Houston Astros 1996 MLB draft selections
Rd.	Slot	Draftee	Position	School	Origin	Signed	Notes	Bio
1	19	Mark Johnson	Right-handed pitcher	Hawaii	(Ohio)	Y	(Note: MLB debut on April 7, 2000 with the Detroit Tigers)	
2	54	John Huber	Right-handed pitcher	Lakota West High	(Ohio)	Y		
3	84	Brandon Byrd	Third baseman	Trinity Presbyterian	(Alabama)	Y		
4	114	Bryan Braswell	Left-handed pitcher	Toledo	(Ohio)	Y		
5	144	Tucker Barr	Catcher	Georgia Tech	(Alabama)	Y		
6	174	Mike Wheeler	Shortstop	Oak Hills High	(Ohio)	Y		
7	204	Esteban Maldonado	Right-handed pitcher	Lambuth	(Puerto Rico)	Y		
8	234	Jason Hill	Catcher	Mt. San Antonio	(California)	Y		
9	264	Brian Dallimore	Second baseman	Stanford	(Nevada)	Y	(Note: MLB debut on April 29, 2004, for the San Francisco Giants)	
10	294	John Blackmore	Right-handed pitcher	Plainville High	(Connecticut)	Y		
20	594	Wade Miller	Right-handed pitcher	Brandywine Heights HS	(Pennsylvania)	Y	(Note: MLB debut on July 7, 1999, with Houston)	
23	684	Roy Oswalt	Right-handed pitcher	Holmes CC	(Mississippi)	Y	(Note: MLB debut on May 6, 2001, with Houston)	
25	744	Paul Phillips	Catcher	Meridian CC	(Alabama)	N	(Note: Signed with the Kansas City Royals from the 1998 draft.) (Note: MLB debut on September 9, 2004, with Kansas City)	
29	864	Tom Shearn	Right-handed pitcher	Briggs High	(Ohio)	Y	(Note: MLB debut on August 26, 2007 with the Cincinnati Reds)	
32	954	Trey Hodges	Right-handed pitcher	Klein Oak High	(Texas)	N	(Note: Signed with the Atlanta Braves from the 2000 draft.) (Note: MLB debut on September 10, 2002, with Atlanta)	

== Awards and achievements ==
=== Grand slams ===
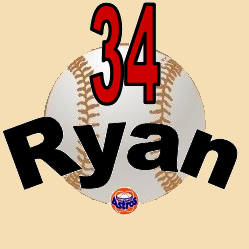
Nolan Ryan's number 34 was retired by the Houston Astros in September 29, 1996.

No.	Date	Astros batter	Venue	Inning	Pitcher	Opposing team	Box
1	June 13	Sean Berry	3Com Park at Candlestick Point	5 (Note: Pinch hitter)	Mark Leiter	San Francisco Giants	
2	June 25	Sean Berry	Jack Murphy Stadium	8	Doug Bochtler	San Diego Padres	

=== Career honors ===
- Houston Astros uniform number retired—No. 34
  - Nolan Ryan, Pitcher • In Houston 1980–1988 • 282 games • 2× MLB All-Star

=== Annual awards ===
1996 Houston Astros award winners
Name of award		Recipient	Ref.
Fred Hartman Award for Long and Meritorious Service to Baseball		Bob Watson	
Gold Glove Award	Second baseman	Craig Biggio	
Houston-Area Major League Player of the Year	NYY	Andy Pettitte	
Houston Astros	Most Valuable Player (MVP)	Jeff Bagwell	
Houston Astros	Rookie of the Year	Billy Wagner	
MLB All-Star Game	Starting second baseman	Craig Biggio	
MLB All-Star Game	Reserve first baseman	Jeff Bagwell	
MLB All-Star Game	Home Run Derby contestant	Jeff Bagwell	
National League (NL) Player of the Month	May	Jeff Bagwell	
The Sporting News NL All-Star	First baseman:	Jeff Bagwell	
Topps All-Star Rookie Team	Left-handed pitcher	Billy Wagner	

Other awards results

Name of award	Voting recipient(s) (Team)	Ref.
NL Cy Young	1st—Smoltz (ATL) • 9th—Reynolds (HOU)	
NL Manager of the Year	1st—Bochy (SD) • 6th—Collins (HOU)	
NL Most Valuable Player	1st—Caminiti (SD) • 9th—Bagwell (HOU)	

=== League leaders ===
NL batting leaders

- Doubles: Jeff Bagwell (46)
- Games played: Jeff Bagwell & Craig Biggio (162)
- Hit by pitch: Craig Biggio (27—led MLB)

NL fielding leaders

- Assists as RF: Derek Bell (16)

== Minor league system ==
Level	Team	League	Manager
AAA	Tucson Toros	Pacific Coast League	Tim Tolman
AA	Jackson Generals	Texas League	Dave Engle
A	Kissimmee Cobras	Florida State League	Alan Ashby
A	Quad Cities River Bandits	Midwest League	Jim Pankovits
A-Short Season	Auburn Doubledays	New York–Penn League	Manny Acta
Rookie	GCL Astros	Gulf Coast League	Bobby Ramos

Championships

- Texas League champions: Jackson

Awards

- Houston Astros Minor League Player of the Year: Bobby Abreu

== See also ==
- List of Major League Baseball annual doubles leaders
- List of Major League Baseball retired numbers
