= C. J. Nitkowski =

American baseball player and broadcaster (born 1973)

- Pitcher
- Born: March 9, 1973 (age 53); Suffern, New York, U.S.
- Batted: Left Threw: Left

Professional debut
- MLB: June 3, 1995, for the Cincinnati Reds
- NPB: 2007, for the Fukuoka Softbank Hawks
- KBO: April 8, 2009, for the SK Wyverns

Last appearance
- MLB: June 7, 2005, for the Washington Nationals
- NPB: 2008, for the Fukuoka Softbank Hawks
- KBO: September 25, 2011, for the Nexen Heroes

MLB statistics
- Win–loss record: 18–32
- Earned run average: 5.37
- Strikeouts: 347

NPB statistics
- Win–loss record: 3–5
- Earned run average: 3.99
- Strikeouts: 55

KBO statistics
- Win–loss record: 9–19
- Earned run average: 4.40
- Strikeouts: 127
- Stats at Baseball Reference

Teams
- Cincinnati Reds (1995); Detroit Tigers (1995–1996); Houston Astros (1998); Detroit Tigers (1999–2001); New York Mets (2001); Texas Rangers (2002–2003); Atlanta Braves (2004); New York Yankees (2004); Washington Nationals (2005); Fukuoka SoftBank Hawks (2007–2008); SK Wyverns (2009); Doosan Bears (2009); Nexen Heroes (2010–2011)

Christopher John Nitkowski (born March 9, 1973) is an American former professional baseball pitcher. A first-round draft choice of the Cincinnati Reds in 1994, he played in Major League Baseball (MLB) for the Reds, Detroit Tigers, Houston Astros, New York Mets, Texas Rangers, Atlanta Braves, New York Yankees, and Washington Nationals. He also played in Nippon Professional Baseball for the Fukuoka SoftBank Hawks, and in the KBO League for the SK Wyverns, Doosan Bears, and Nexen Heroes. Nitkowski currently works as a color analyst for the Braves and for SiriusXM's MLB Network Radio.

== Amateur career ==
Nitkowski grew up in Suffern, New York, and attended Don Bosco Preparatory High School in Ramsey, New Jersey, graduating in 1991. Not drafted out of high school, he attended Florida Atlantic University for one year before transferring to St. John's University.

== Professional career ==
=== Major League Baseball ===
The Cincinnati Reds made Nitkowski the ninth overall pick in the 1994 Major League Baseball draft. He made his major-league debut on June 3, 1995, with the Reds. The Reds traded Nitkowski, a player to be named later (later selected to be Mark Lewis), and minor-leaguer Dave Tuttle to the Detroit Tigers for David Wells on July 31, 1995.

After the 1996 season, the Tigers traded Nitkowski with Brad Ausmus, José Lima, Trever Miller, and Daryle Ward to the Houston Astros for Doug Brocail, Brian Hunter, Todd Jones, Orlando Miller, and cash. After the 1998 season, the Astros traded Nitkowski with Ausmus back to the Tigers for Paul Bako, Dean Crow, Brian Powell, and minor-leaguers Carlos Villalobos and Mark Persails. Late in the 2001 season, the Tigers traded Nitkowski to the New York Mets for a player to be named later, later identified as minor-leaguer Kyle Kessel.

Nitkowski signed with the Texas Rangers and played for the team in 2002 and 2003. He split the 2004 season between the Atlanta Braves and the New York Yankees. He pitched for the Washington Nationals in 2005. In the 2006 season, he played exclusively in Triple-A with the Pittsburgh Pirates organization.

=== Later years ===
After the 2006 season, Nitkowski accepted a one-year contract tender with Nippon Professional Baseball's Fukuoka SoftBank Hawks. He played two seasons for the Hawks, but did not return to the team in 2009.

Nitkowski began the 2009 season with the SK Wyverns in South Korea, but was granted his release by the team on June 20. On June 28, 2009, the Doosan Bears in South Korea claimed him off waivers. He was released at the end of the season due to concerns over a shoulder injury he suffered in Game 1 of the first round of the playoffs. In July 2010, Nitkowski signed with the Nexen Heroes based in Seoul, South Korea.

Nitkowski signed a minor-league deal on July 13, 2012, with the New York Mets. He began using a sidearm delivery.

== Media career ==
After retiring from baseball in April 2013, Nitkowski began a career in media as a writer, studio host, radio host, color analyst and play-by-play man. As a writer, he has had articles published for Sports Illustrated, Associated Press, SB Nation, Baseball Prospectus, ESPN.com and MLB.com. From 2013 to 2016, he wrote exclusively for Fox Sports, including for the now defunct Just a Bit Outside, Fox's baseball microsite that attempted to follow the Monday Morning Quarterback model.

=== Radio ===
From 2013 to 2016, Nitkowski co-hosted Eye on Baseball, a national radio baseball show for CBS Sports Radio. His co-hosts on the show were Damon Bruce (2013), Brandon Tierney (2013) and Adam "The Bull" Gerstenhaber (2014–2016). Nitkowski is also a host and analyst for MLB Network Radio on SiriusXM He currently appears on Loud Outs weekdays 3-6PM ET with Ryan Spilborghs and Brad Lidge.

In 2013, Nitkowski filled in for Suzyn Waldman and worked alongside John Sterling on New York Yankees radio broadcasts for 880 CBS Radio. In 2013, he was also a studio analyst for MLB.com. In 2014, Nitkowski called a handful of New York Mets games on radio alongside Josh Lewin and Howie Rose for WOR 710. From 2017 to 2019, he had a weekly show with sports radio 1310 AM and 96.7 FM The Ticket's BaD Radio Show hosted by Bob Sturm and Dan McDowell in Dallas, Texas.

=== Television ===
From 2014 to 2016, Nitkowski was a studio analyst for Fox Sports 1, where he was a regular on their baseball highlight show MLB Whip Around, which debuted on March 31, 2013. He also made appearances on FS1's other studio shows as well as Fox's Saturday MLB pre- and post-game coverage. Other analysts he has worked with at FS1 include former MLB players Frank Thomas, Gabe Kapler, Mark Sweeney, Raúl Ibañez, Pete Rose, Alex Rodriguez and Eric Karros. Nitkowski has called nationally televised MLB games for FS1 and Fox from 2014 to 2019 and has worked with play-by-play men Thom Brennaman, Kenny Albert, Brian Anderson, Len Kasper, Rich Waltz, Justin Kutcher and Tom McCarthy. He started in television on CBS Sports Network, where he served as a color analyst on NCAA baseball games. He has also made appearances on MLB Network and ESPN.

In 2017, Nitkowski was named a member of the Texas Rangers' television broadcast booth, where served in both the color analyst and play-by-play roles through 2023. Nitkowski was nominated seven times and won five regional Sports Emmy Awards for his work on Rangers broadcasts. He was also part of the 2016 broadcast group on Fox which won a national Sports Emmy for their postseason coverage.

In December 2023, Nitkowski joined the Atlanta Braves' television crew as the primary analyst on Bally Sports South and Bally Sports Southeast beginning in the 2024 season.

== Personal life ==
On January 30, 2009, it was revealed that Nitkowski was interviewed by the FBI as part of its investigation into the perjury case against Roger Clemens. Nitkowski worked out sporadically in the off-seasons from 2001 to 2006, while also being trained by Brian McNamee, Clemens' principal accuser. Nitkowski, in a statement to the Associated Press (an organization he also occasionally contributes to as a writer) said, "I have never seen Roger or Andy take any illegal performance-enhancing drugs. I have never talked to either of them about PEDs, nor do I have any firsthand knowledge of them taking any PEDs."

Nitkowski was the first major-leaguer to maintain his own website, www.CJBaseball.com, where he posted ongoing personal diaries about life in the big leagues, as early as 1997. As of 2026, the site no longer works but can be viewed via Internet Archive’s Wayback Machine.

In 2018, while working as a play-by-play announcer for the Texas Rangers, Nitowski drew controversy after liking a tweet posted by the Proud Boys, a white nationalist organization. Saying that he found nothing objectionable about the Proud Boys, he said, "I unfollowed once I realized it was going to affect the [Texas Rangers] organization. Otherwise, I would not have. That’s the change.”

After having moved to serving as color commentator for the Atlanta Braves, Nitkowski again went viral in 2026 after discussing on air the fact that Braves outfielder Eli White had gone on the paternity list after his wife gave birth to their child. He said, "We need more great people in this world. The more Whites, the better off we’re going to be."

Raised a Catholic, Nitkowski converted to Evangelical Protestantism after an incident in which his son nearly drowned in a swimming pool during spring training in 2002.

== Film and television ==
In May 2012, Nitkowski was filmed playing the role of former MLB player Dutch Leonard for a scene in the motion picture 42, which chronicles Jackie Robinson's life story. Coincidentally, the footage was shot in Engel Stadium in Chattanooga, Tennessee, the ballpark where Nitkowski broke into professional baseball as a first-round pick of the Reds in 1994.

In 2016, Nitkowski served as a script and technical consultant for Dan Fogelman's Pitch, a television drama about the first woman to reach the Major Leagues.
