= Pedro Martínez (left-handed pitcher) =

Dominican baseball player (born 1968)

- Pitcher
- Born: November 29, 1968 (age 56); Villa Mella, Dominican Republic
- Batted: Left Threw: Left

MLB debut
- June 23, 1993, for the San Diego Padres

Last MLB appearance
- September 6, 1997, for the Cincinnati Reds

MLB statistics
- Win–loss record: 7–4
- Earned run average: 3.97
- Strikeouts: 114
- Stats at Baseball Reference

Teams
- San Diego Padres (1993–1994); Houston Astros (1995); New York Mets (1996); Cincinnati Reds (1996–1997)

Pedro Martínez Aquino (born November 29, 1968), commonly but inaccurately referred to as Pedro A. Martínez (to distinguish him from the more famous Pedro Jaime Martínez), is a Dominican former Major League Baseball pitcher.

== Career ==
He was an effective reliever for the San Diego Padres in 1993 and 1994, but after being part of the 11-player trade between the Padres and the Houston Astros after the 1994 season (in which he, Derek Bell, Doug Brocail, Ricky Gutiérrez, Phil Plantier, and Craig Shipley went to the Astros for Ken Caminiti, Andújar Cedeño, Steve Finley, Robert Petagine, Brian Williams, and minor league player Sean Fesh), he was never effective with the Astros in 1995. He spent the next two seasons with the New York Mets and the Cincinnati Reds, pitching only a handful of major league games without ever regaining his success with the Padres. He finished his career with a 3.97 earned run average in 142 2/3 innings.
