= Steve Finley =

American baseball player (born 1965)

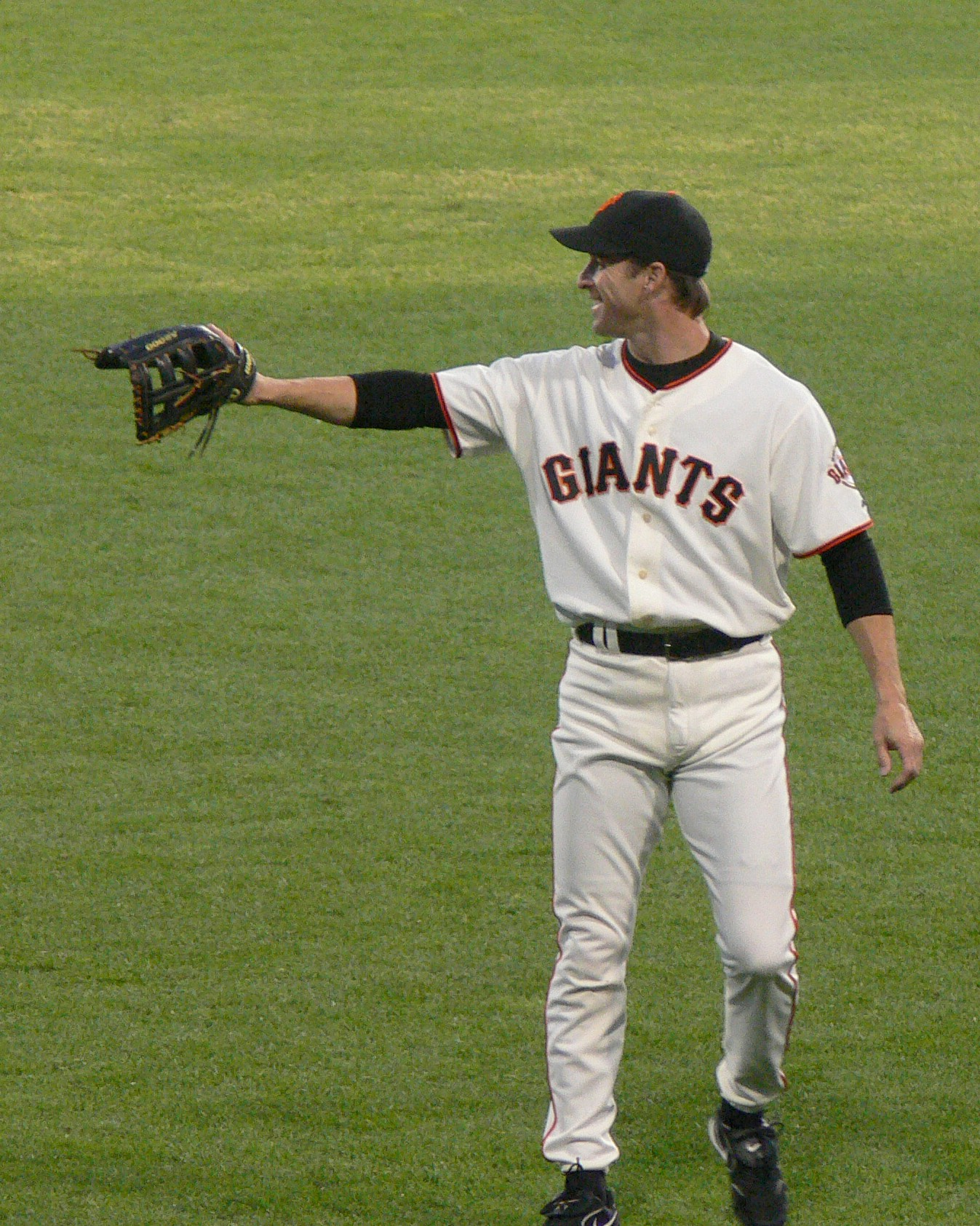
- Finley with the San Francisco Giants
- Center fielder
- Born: March 12, 1965 (age 61); Union City, Tennessee, U.S.
- Batted: Left Threw: Left

MLB debut
- April 3, 1989, for the Baltimore Orioles

Last MLB appearance
- June 3, 2007, for the Colorado Rockies

MLB statistics
- Batting average: .271
- Hits: 2,548
- Home runs: 304
- Runs batted in: 1,167
- Stats at Baseball Reference

Teams
- Baltimore Orioles (1989–1990); Houston Astros (1991–1994); San Diego Padres (1995–1998); Arizona Diamondbacks (1999–2004); Los Angeles Dodgers (2004); Los Angeles Angels of Anaheim (2005); San Francisco Giants (2006); Colorado Rockies (2007)

Career highlights and awards
- 2× All-Star (1997, 2000); World Series champion (2001); 5× Gold Glove Award (1995, 1996, 1999, 2000, 2004)

Steven Allen Finley (born March 12, 1965) is an American former center fielder in Major League Baseball who played for eight teams between 1989 and 2007, most notably the Houston Astros, San Diego Padres, and Arizona Diamondbacks. An outstanding all-around player with power, speed, and defensive skill, he is one of only eight players with 300 home runs and 300 stolen bases, alongside Barry Bonds, Alex Rodriguez, Willie Mays, Bobby Bonds, Andre Dawson, Carlos Beltrán, and Reggie Sanders.

A two-time All-Star (1997, 2000), Finley led the National League (NL) in triples twice, and helped the Diamondbacks win the 2001 World Series title, batting .368 in the Series. His walk-off grand slam in an October game against the San Francisco Giants clinched the 2004 division title for the Los Angeles Dodgers. Finley's 2,487 career games as an outfielder ranked ninth in major league history when he retired, with his 2,314 games in center field trailing only Mays and Tris Speaker; he also ranked seventh among outfielders with 5,664 putouts. Since retiring he has worked for the Padres as a broadcast analyst and in player development, and also works for Morgan Stanley, advising athletes as a financial manager.

== Early life ==
Finley grew up in Paducah, Kentucky. He attended Paducah Tilghman High School and Southern Illinois University, where he earned a degree in physiology and played for the baseball team from 1984 to 1987.

== Career ==
=== College, Team USA, and minor leagues ===
In 1986, Finley was selected by the Atlanta Braves in the 11th round of the draft, but did not sign. He instead chose to remain at SIU, where he was a two-time All-Missouri Valley Conference performer and a third-team All-American in 1986, and was named the team's Most Valuable Player in 1987. He is a member of the Saluki Baseball Hall of Fame.

He was a member of the 1986 Team USA squad that won a bronze medal during international competition in the Netherlands.

In 1987, he was selected by the Baltimore Orioles in the 13th round of the draft, and did sign.

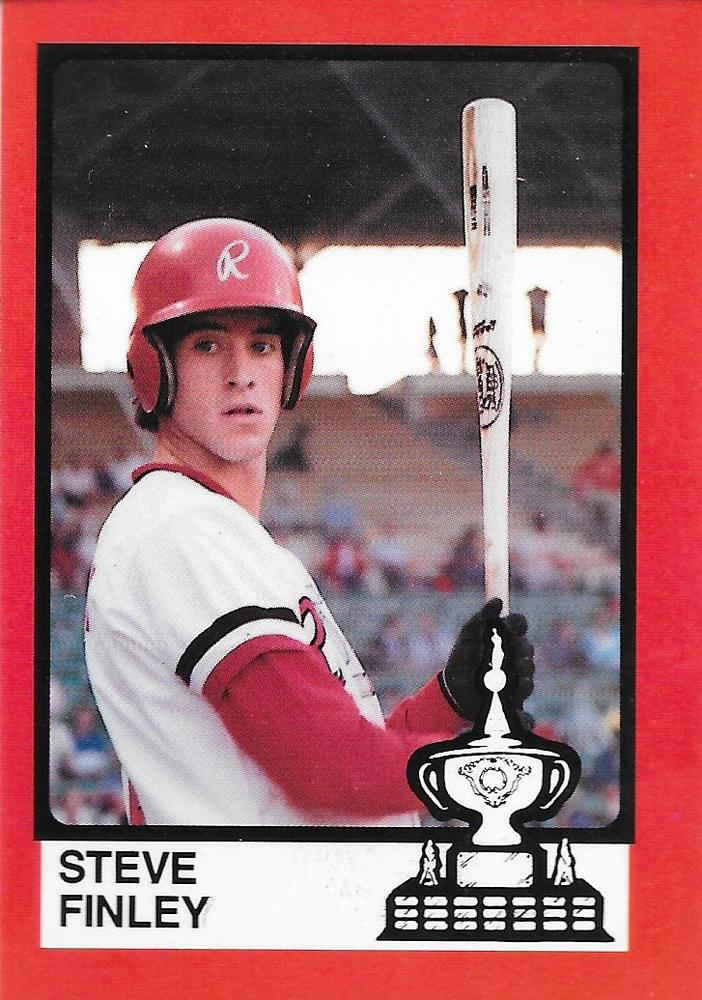
A 1988 baseball card of Finley with the Rochester Red Wings

In 919 at bats in the minor leagues, Finley batted .309 with 68 stolen bases.

On August 29, 2009, Finley was inducted into the Rochester Red Wings Hall of Fame.

=== Orioles and Astros ===
In a transaction considered by Orioles fans as the worst in team history according to Thom Loverro, Finley was traded along with Curt Schilling and Pete Harnisch to the Houston Astros for Glenn Davis on January 10, 1991. He joined an Astros organization that was for sale and lightening its payroll by going with younger, inexpensive players. That year he was third in the league in triples (10), sixth in hits (170), ninth in stolen bases (34), and tenth in sacrifice hits (10). His 13 outfield assists tied Barry Bonds and Paul O'Neill for third in the league.

In 1992, he led the NL in games played (162), was second in triples (13), third in stolen bases (a career-high 44) and sacrifice hits (10), and seventh in hits (177).

In 1993, he led the league in triples (13). He had been slowed in spring training by Bell's palsy, a viral infection of a nerve in his upper neck, resulting in numbness that prevented him from closing his left eye.

In 1994, he was second in the league in sacrifice hits (13), and tenth in triples (5). He appeared in only 94 games due to an injury and the strike-shortened season. He missed nearly a month after being hit by a pitch in a June 8 road game against the Montreal Expos, breaking the third metacarpal bone in his right hand. In December 1994, he was traded by the Astros with Ken Caminiti, Andújar Cedeño, Roberto Petagine, Brian Williams, and minor leaguer Sean Fesh to the San Diego Padres for Derek Bell, Doug Brocail, Ricky Gutiérrez, Pedro A. Martinez, Phil Plantier, and Craig Shipley.

=== Padres and Diamondbacks ===
In 1995, Finley batted a career-high .297 and was third in the league in runs (104) and triples (8), and fourth in stolen bases (36) and hits (167). Finley also won his first Gold Glove Award. He was the only National League player to have 100 runs, 10 home runs, and 35 stolen bases. He stole a career-high 4 bases on August 12 vs. the St. Louis Cardinals. He was in the delivery room on September 1 when son Reed was born, and then headed to the ballpark and played in the 8th and 9th innings of San Diego's 6–3 win over the Philadelphia Phillies.

He was named Most Valuable Player in the All-Stars Series between Japan and the United States (Tokyo, 1996). Later in 1996, during Rickey Henderson's first season with San Diego, he boarded the team bus and was looking for a seat. Finley said, "You have tenure, sit wherever you want." Henderson looked at Finley and said, "Ten years? Rickey's been playing at least 16, 17 years." That season, Finley was second in the NL in runs (126; a career high) and doubles (45), third in extra base hits (84), fourth in triples (9), and sixth in hits (195). Finley won his second Gold Glove Award and came in tenth in the MVP voting. He established Padres records in runs, doubles, extra base hits, and total bases.

In 1997, he hit three home runs in a game twice (May 19 and June 23). Finley was voted to the All-Star team, and finished eighth in the league in runs (101).

He hit his first game-ending grand slam on April 10, 1998, for the Padres. The Padres would appear in the World Series that year against the New York Yankees, where they were swept in four games.

In December 1998, he signed as a free agent with the Arizona Diamondbacks. In 1999, he hit three home runs and had 6 runs batted in in a game on September 8. That season he had 34 home runs and a career-high 103 RBI, and was seventh in the league in extra base hits (76). Finley also won his third Gold Glove Award.

In 2000, he had 35 home runs and a career-high .544 slugging percentage, and was ninth in the league in sacrifice flies (9). He was voted to the All-Star team. Finley also had 10 outfield assists and won his fourth Gold Glove Award. He was named the team co-Player of the Year with Luis Gonzalez by the Arizona chapter of the BBWAA.

In 2001, Finley had a stellar postseason, leading the Diamondbacks with a .421 batting average in the National League Division Series and 5 RBI in the National League Championship Series as Arizona went on to win its first World Series. On August 30 of that year, Finley became the Diamondbacks' first position player to serve as a relief pitcher, during a 13–5 loss to the Giants. Finley would win the first and only World Series title of his career in 7 games against the Yankees, the same team he lost to three years prior in 1998 while with the Padres.

In 2003, Finley led the league in triples (10), becoming the oldest player in major league history to lead his league in triples.

=== Later years ===
In July 2004, he was traded by the Diamondbacks with Brent Mayne to the Dodgers for Koyie Hill, Reggie Abercrombie, and Bill Murphy (minors). On October 2, he hit his second career game-ending grand slam against the Giants, which capped off a seven-run ninth inning and clinched the 2004 NL West division title for the Dodgers. At the end of the season, he was eighth in at bats (628) and plate appearances (706), and ninth in home runs (36; the third-highest total ever for a 39-year-old in the majors, behind Barry Bonds and Hank Aaron). Finley also won his fifth Gold Glove Award and tied Pete Rose's record of playing in 162 games at the age of 39.

In December 2004, Finley signed as a free agent with the Los Angeles Angels of Anaheim. In 2005, he missed 18 games due to a strained right shoulder, his first disabled list stint since 1997. In December 2005, he was traded by the Angels to the Giants for Edgardo Alfonzo.

In 2006, at the age of 41, Finley became the oldest player ever to play more than 100 games in center field. He also reached several career milestones during his season with the Giants: On May 8 against Houston, he reached 4,000 total bases with a single in a 7–5 win. On June 14 in Arizona, he hit his 300th home run off Claudio Vargas to lead off the game, with the Giants going on to win 11–4. On July 23 against San Diego, he reached 2,500 hits with an RBI double and a single in a 12-inning 6–5 loss. And on August 7 in Arizona, he appeared in his 2,500th game, drawing a walk as a late-inning replacement in an 8–4 win. However, he ended the season with just a .246 average, batting only .235 with one home run and 9 RBI after June 25. On November 1, the Giants declined their option on Finley for the 2007 season, which made him a free agent. On February 24, 2007, Finley signed a minor-league contract with the Colorado Rockies. After an impressive spring, Finley made their Opening Day roster. On June 5, the Rockies designated Finley for assignment, giving the Rockies 10 days to trade, release, or send him to the minor leagues. Finley had batted .181 (17-for-94) with one home run and two RBIs in 43 games for Colorado. He was released on June 17. At the time of his release, of all active players, he was first in triples (124), third in games (2,583) and at bats (9,397), fourth in hits (2,548), seventh in runs (1,443), eighth in total bases (4,157), and ninth in doubles (449) and stolen bases (320). He was also the sixth-oldest player in the NL.

== See also ==
- Arizona Diamondbacks award winners and league leaders
- Houston Astros award winners and league leaders
- List of Houston Astros team records
- List of Major League Baseball annual triples leaders
- List of Major League Baseball career hits leaders
- List of Major League Baseball career home run leaders
- List of Major League Baseball career doubles leaders
- List of Major League Baseball career triples leaders
- List of Major League Baseball career runs scored leaders
- List of Major League Baseball career runs batted in leaders
- List of Major League Baseball career stolen bases leaders
- List of Major League Baseball career total bases leaders
