= Doug Brocail =

American baseball player and coach (born 1967)

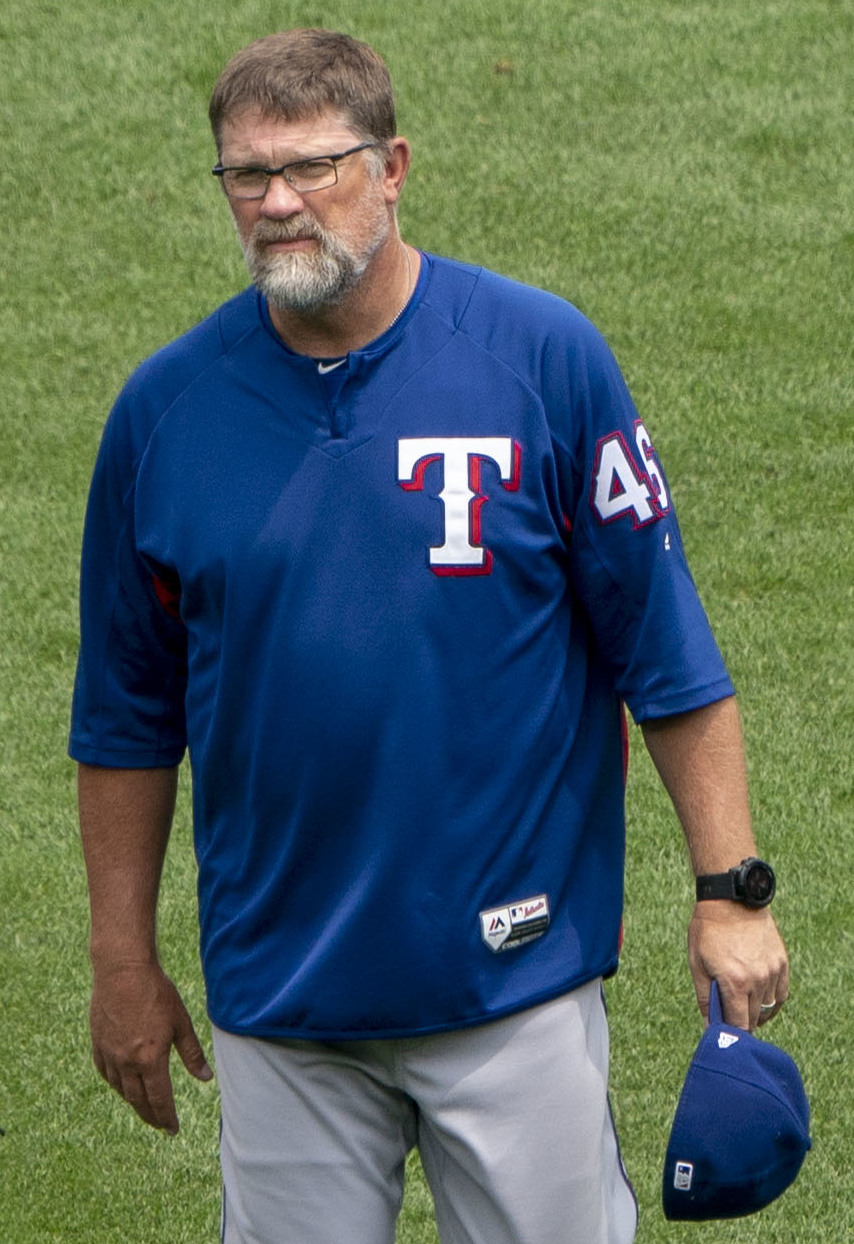
- Brocail with the Texas Rangers in 2018
- Pitcher
- Born: May 16, 1967 (age 59); Clearfield, Pennsylvania, U.S.
- Batted: Left Threw: Right

MLB debut
- September 8, 1992, for the San Diego Padres

Last MLB appearance
- October 2, 2009, for the Houston Astros

MLB statistics
- Win–loss record: 52–48
- Earned run average: 4.00
- Strikeouts: 642
- Stats at Baseball Reference

Teams
- San Diego Padres (1992–1994); Houston Astros (1995–1996); Detroit Tigers (1997–2000); Texas Rangers (2004–2005); San Diego Padres (2006–2007); Houston Astros (2008–2009)

Douglas Keith Brocail (born May 16, 1967) is an American professional baseball pitcher and pitching coach. He played in Major League Baseball (MLB) for the San Diego Padres, Houston Astros, Detroit Tigers, and Texas Rangers. He has coached in MLB for the Astros, Rangers, and the Orioles.

== Playing career ==
Brocail attended Lamar High School in Lamar, Colorado where he won All-State honors in football, basketball, and baseball. The San Diego Padres selected Brocail in the first round of the 1986 Major League Baseball draft. He did not make his major league debut until 1992 because of injuries sustained in the minors. Initially a starter, Brocail went 4–13 in his first full season (1993) before being converted to relief.

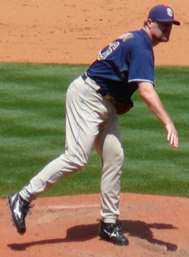
Brocail with the San Diego Padres

After the 1994 season, the Padres traded Brocail, Derek Bell, Ricky Gutiérrez, Pedro Martínez, Phil Plantier, and Craig Shipley to the Houston Astros for Ken Caminiti, Andújar Cedeño, Steve Finley, Roberto Petagine, and Brian Williams. After the 1996 season, the Astros traded Brocail, Brian Hunter, Todd Jones, Orlando Miller, and cash to the Detroit Tigers for Brad Ausmus, José Lima, Trever Miller, C. J. Nitkowski, and Daryle Ward. After the 2000 season, the Tigers traded Brocail, Ausmus, and Nelson Cruz to the Astros for Roger Cedeño, Chris Holt, and Mitch Meluskey.

Two Tommy John surgeries kept Brocail out of the major leagues for nearly four years (2000–04). He returned in 2004 with the Texas Rangers and was placed on the disabled list in May for 15 days due to an appendectomy. He pitched for San Diego in 2006 and 2007. On June 20, 2007, Brocail hit Orioles shortstop Miguel Tejada with a pitch that broke Tejada's wrist, leading to Tejada being placed on the disabled list a few days later, ending his consecutive games streak at 1,152, the fifth longest in Major League history.

Brocail underwent an angioplasty on March 11, 2006, to clear a 99% blockage of his left anterior descending artery. He had complained of chest tightness that radiated into both arms. He already was being treated for an abscessed tooth and asthma. Weeks later, Brocail underwent a second, more complex angioplasty in which he received three stents in his heart in addition to the one put in prior. Post-heart surgeries, Brocail returned to the mound on July 14, 2006.

Brocail pitched relief for the Astros in 2008 and 2009 before retiring at the age of 42.

== Coaching career ==
After the Houston Astros fired pitching coach Brad Arnsberg on June 14, 2011, Brocail was named the interim pitching coach. In October 2013, Brocail was reassigned by the Astros to the role of special assistant. Brocail served as interim pitching coach for the Corpus Christi Hooks in 2014, and full time for Corpus Christi in 2015.

In November 2015, Brocail was offered a spot as the Texas Rangers pitching coach by Rangers manager Jeff Banister. Brocail accepted the position, replacing the departed Mike Maddux. Brocail led the Rangers' pitching staff through the 2017 and 2018 seasons.

Brocail was announced on January 23, 2019, as the Baltimore Orioles pitching coach succeeding Roger McDowell. During his two seasons in this capacity, the Orioles' pitching staff went from being one of MLB's worst to lowering its ERA by a run, with the bullpen giving up almost two less runs per game. He was not retained after the 2020 season as the Orioles continued to streamline its player personnel operations.

== Personal life ==
Brocail and his wife Lisa have five daughters. The family lives in Missouri City, Texas.

On September 13, 2004, Brocail was involved in an incident at the McAfee Coliseum, when the Texas Rangers were playing the Oakland Athletics. His rookie teammate Frank Francisco, angry at a fan for heckling Brocail and others, hoisted a folded chair into the stands, striking a female fan and breaking her nose. Brocail would later pitch 1/3 of an inning.

== See also ==
- Best pitching seasons by a Detroit Tiger

Sporting positions
Preceded by Brad Arnsberg	Houston Astros pitching coach 2011–2013	Succeeded by Brent Strom
Preceded by Mike Maddux	Texas Rangers pitching coach 2016–2018	Succeeded by Julio Rangel
Preceded by Roger McDowell	Baltimore Orioles pitching coach 2019-2021	Succeeded by Chris Holt
