= Brian Hunter (outfielder) =

American baseball player (born 1971)

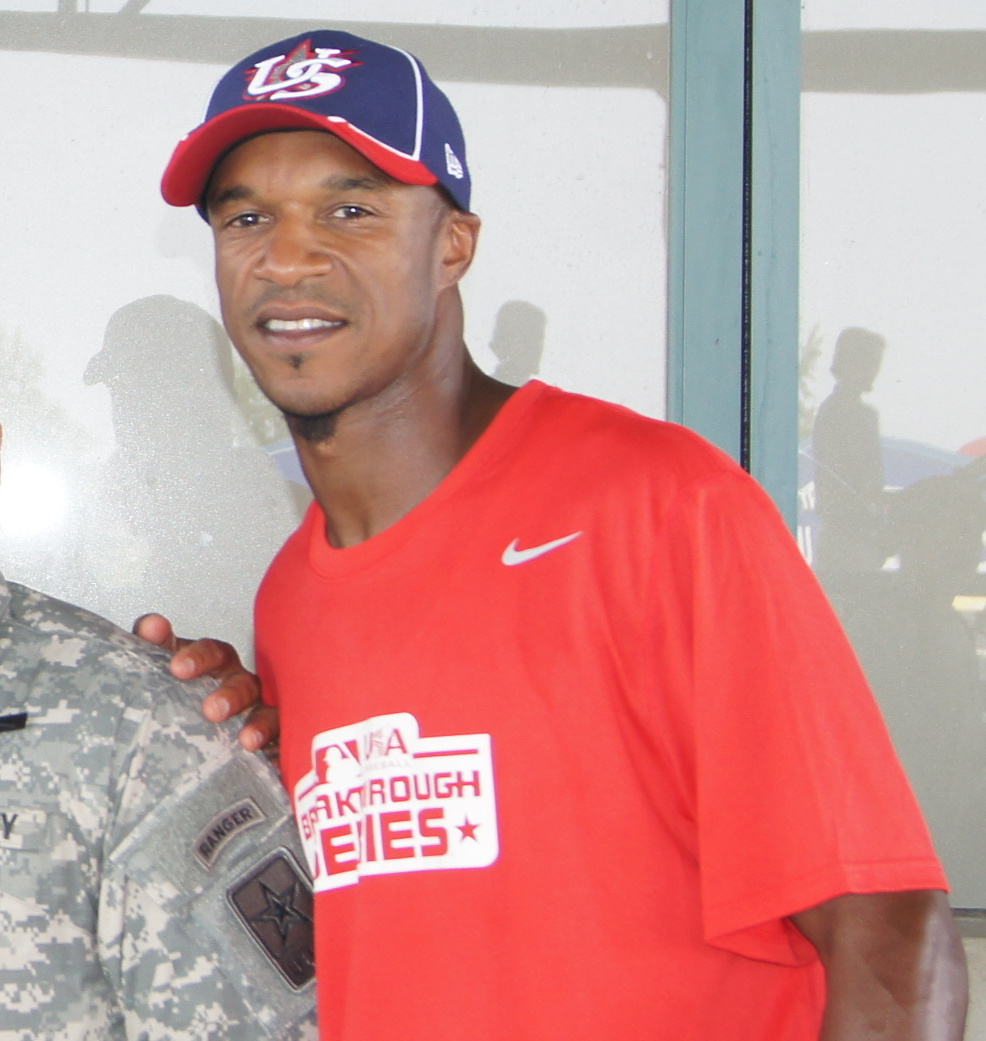
- Hunter at Durham Bulls Athletic Park in 2011
- Center fielder
- Born: March 25, 1971 (age 55); Portland, Oregon, U.S.
- Batted: Right Threw: Right

MLB debut
- June 27, 1994, for the Houston Astros

Last MLB appearance
- July 24, 2003, for the Houston Astros

MLB statistics
- Batting average: .264
- Home runs: 25
- Runs batted in: 241
- Stolen bases: 260
- Stats at Baseball Reference

Teams
- Houston Astros (1994–1996); Detroit Tigers (1997–1999); Seattle Mariners (1999); Colorado Rockies (2000); Cincinnati Reds (2000); Philadelphia Phillies (2001); Houston Astros (2002–2003)

Career highlights and awards
- 2× AL stolen base leader (1997, 1999)

Brian Lee Hunter (born March 25, 1971) is an American former professional baseball center fielder. He played in Major League Baseball (MLB) for the Houston Astros, Detroit Tigers, Seattle Mariners, Colorado Rockies, Cincinnati Reds, and Philadelphia Phillies . He led MLB with 74 stolen bases in 1997 and led the American League with 44 steals in 1999.

== Minor league career ==
Hunter was born on March 25, 1971, in Portland, Oregon. He graduated from Fort Vancouver High School in Vancouver, Washington.

The Houston Astros Hunter drafted Hunter in the second round with the 35th overall selection of the 1989 Major League Baseball (MLB) draft. Hunter spent a little over five and a half seasons in the minor leagues. He began his pro career with the Gulf Coast League Astros in 1989. Hunter then spent the next three seasons in Class A, playing for the Asheville Tourists of the South Atlantic League in 1990, then the Osceola Astros of the Florida State League for two seasons 1991–1992. After a season in Double-A with the Jackson Generals of the Texas League, where he led the team in stolen bases and was a mid-season and postseason All-Star, Hunter moved up to Triple-A and played most of the season with the Tucson Toros of the Pacific Coast League (PCL) in 1994. He led all minor league batters with a .372 batting average and led the (PCL) with 49 steals, which were a Tucson record. Hunter also played in the Arizona Fall League after the 1994 season.

== Major league career ==
Hunter made his major league debut for the Astros on June 27, 1994 against the Cincinnati Reds. Leading off, he singled in his first MLB at bat off Erik Hanson, stole second and scored on a Craig Biggio groundout. In his lone week in the majors in 1994, he batted .250 with one double and two steals. In his rookie season, Hunter joined the Astros on June 13. Three days later, he hit his first MLB home run, off Doug Henry of the New York Mets. On July 4, Omar Olivares of the Colorado Rockies hit Hunter in the right hand with a pitch, breaking a bone in his hand and landing him on the disabled list. On September 28, Hunter stole 4 bases, tying a franchise record. Hunter batted .302 with 2 home runs and 24 steals in 1995.

Hunter missed almost a month of the 1996 season with a strained ribcage. He led Houston with 35 steals, batting .276 with 5 home runs, all of which were solo, no-out home runs while he was batting in the leadoff spot.

On December 10, 1996, the Astros traded Hunter, Orlando Miller, Todd Jones, Doug Brocail and cash to the Detroit Tigers for Daryle Ward, C. J. Nitkowski, Trever Miller, José Lima, and Brad Ausmus. Hunter was named the American League (AL) Player of the Week for June 30–July 6, 1997 after hitting his first career grand slam on July 4, tying a game against the Baltimore Orioles. Baseball America called Hunter the fastest base runner in 1997, as he led the majors with 74 stolen bases and was caught stealing 18 times. His 74 steals have not been surpassed by an AL player since; only José Reyes in 2007 has more steals in a season. Hunter played all 162 games that year; he also led the majors in putouts and committed only four errors. As a batter, Hunter set a franchise record by making 525 outs, later surpassed by Ian Kinsler in 2014. Hunter's batting average declined for the fourth straight season in 1998, batting .254 with 4 home runs and 42 steals in 142 games.

On April 28, 1999, the Tigers traded Hunter to the Seattle Mariners for Andy Van Hekken and minor league outfielder Jerry Amador. He again led the AL in stolen bases, with 44 in 1999, although his .232 batting average was the worst among qualified batters. On March 27, 2000, he was released by the Mariners, and four days later he signed with the Colorado Rockies. Colorado traded him to the Reds on August 6 for minor league pitcher Robert Averette. After the season, he had surgery to repair torn cartilage in his right knee. On November 27 he was released by the Reds, and on January 10, 2001, Hunter signed with the Philadelphia Phillies, who in turn granted him free agency on November 5. Hunter finished his major league career where it began, with the Astros in 2002–2003. Hunter played in the St. Louis Cardinals system in 2004 and for the independent Camden Riversharks in 2005.

Because of his speed, ESPN's Chris Berman nicknamed the outfielder, "Deer" Hunter.

== Coaching career ==
Hunter was hired as hitting coach for the Everett AquaSox for the 2015 season. After two years in that role, he was hired as a coach for the Tacoma Rainiers. He did not return to Tacoma in 2018.

Hunter became an assistant coach at Union High School in Camas, Washington in 2023, coaching alongside his brother, Lee.

== Personal life ==
Hunter has a son. His brother, Lee, played college and independent baseball and has coached with Hunter at Union High School.

Hunter started the Designated Hitters Foundation, which supported youth sports. He has organized youth baseball clinics.

== See also ==
- List of Major League Baseball career stolen bases leaders
- List of Major League Baseball annual stolen base leaders
