= Mark Small =

American baseball player (1967-2013)

- Pitcher
- Born: November 12, 1967; Portland, Oregon, U.S.
- Died: October 22, 2013 (aged 45); Edmonds, Washington, U.S.
- Batted: Right Threw: Right

MLB debut
- April 5, 1996, for the Houston Astros

Last MLB appearance
- September 3, 1996, for the Houston Astros

MLB statistics
- Win–loss record: 0–1
- Earned run average: 5.92
- Strikeouts: 16
- Stats at Baseball Reference

Teams
- Houston Astros (1996)

Mark Allen Small (November 12, 1967 - October 22, 2013) was an American professional baseball pitcher. Small played for the Houston Astros of Major League Baseball (MLB) in 1996. In 16 career games, he had a 0-1 record with a 5.92 ERA. He batted and threw right-handed.

Small attended Washington State University, where he played college baseball for the Cougars from 1988–1989. He was drafted by the Astros in the 17th round of the 1989 amateur draft.

Small was surrounded by family and friends when he died at 9:30 pm in Edmonds, Washington on October 22, 2013. A cause of death was not reported.
