= Mike Simms =

American baseball player (born 1967)

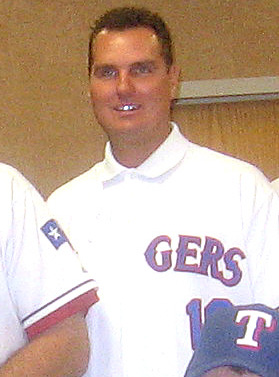
- Sims in 2010
- Outfielder
- Born: January 12, 1967 (age 59); Orange, California, U.S.
- Batted: Right Threw: Right

MLB debut
- September 5, 1990, for the Houston Astros

Last MLB appearance
- October 3, 1999, for the Texas Rangers

MLB statistics
- Batting average: .247
- Home runs: 36
- Runs batted in: 121
- Stats at Baseball Reference

Teams
- Houston Astros (1990–1992, 1994–1996); Texas Rangers (1997–1999)

Michael Howard Simms (born January 12, 1967) is an American former Major League Baseball outfielder. He played all or parts of nine seasons in the majors between 1990 and 1999. Six of those seasons (1990–92 and 1994–96) were spent with the Houston Astros, and three (1997–99) with the Texas Rangers.

Simms was drafted out of Esperanza High School in Anaheim, California by the Astros in 1985. Most of his career highs were set in 1998 for the Rangers, when he batted .296 with 16 home runs and 46 RBI in just 186 at bats. Despite his performance, he played just four games with Texas in 1999 and none in the majors thereafter. Dan McDowell of KTCK-1310 the ticket radio station in Dallas called Simms, “ One of the most underrated Rangers players in Texas History.”

== Sources ==
- Career statistics from Baseball Reference · Baseball Reference (Minors) · Retrosheet · Baseball Almanac
