= Dean Hartgraves =

American baseball player (born 1966)

- Pitcher
- Born: August 12, 1966 (age 60); Bakersfield, California, U.S.
- Batted: Right Threw: Left

Professional debut
- MLB: May 3, 1995, for the Houston Astros
- NPB: May 23, 1999, for the Chiba Lotte Marines

Last appearance
- MLB: July 23, 1998, for the San Francisco Giants
- NPB: June 23, 1999, for the Chiba Lotte Marines

MLB statistics
- Win–loss record: 3–0
- Earned run average: 4.41
- Strikeouts: 58

NPB statistics
- Win–loss record: 0–2
- Earned run average: 7.45
- Strikeouts: 4
- Stats at Baseball Reference

Teams
- Houston Astros (1995–1996); Atlanta Braves (1996); San Francisco Giants (1998); Chiba Lotte Marines (1999)

Dean Charles Hartgraves (born August 12, 1966) is an American former Major League Baseball pitcher who played in 1995, 1996, and 1998 with the Houston Astros, Atlanta Braves, and San Francisco Giants. He threw left-handed but batted right-handed. Hartgraves attended Crater High School in Central Point, Oregon before attending Fresno State University and Portland State University.

Hartgraves was selected by the New York Mets in the 12th round of the 1986 Major League Baseball draft. He did not sign that time, but when he was drafted by the Astros in the 20th round of the 1987 Major League Baseball draft, he did. Between 1987 and 1995, Hartgraves spent his time in the Astros farm system, mostly with Triple-A Tucson and Double-A Jackson. Perhaps his best minor league season was 1992 with Jackson, where he went 9–6 with a 2.76 ERA.

On May 3, 1995, he made his major league debut against the Chicago Cubs at the age of 28. His rookie season was his best wherein 40 games he had a 3.22 ERA. Overall in his career, he would appear in 84 games, with a 4.41 ERA and a 3–0 record. As a batter, he hit .000 in 3 at-bats. He was flawless on the field, committing zero errors.

Hartgraves played his final game in the major leagues on July 23, 1998, against the St. Louis Cardinals. Afterwards, he played in Japan's Pacific League for the Chiba Lotte Marines in 1999.
