= Dave Hajek =

American baseball player (born 1967)

- Infielder
- Born: October 14, 1967 (age 58); Roseville, California, U.S.
- Batted: Right Threw: Right

MLB debut
- September 15, 1995, for the Houston Astros

Last MLB appearance
- September 26, 1996, for the Houston Astros

MLB statistics
- Games: 13
- At bats: 12
- Hits: 3
- Stats at Baseball Reference

Teams
- Houston Astros (1995–1996)

David Vincent Hajek (born October 14, 1967) is an American former infielder in Major League Baseball who played from 1995 to 1996 for the Houston Astros.

A native of Roseville, California, Hajek attended San Juan High School and California State Polytechnic University, Pomona. In 1988, he played collegiate summer baseball with the Chatham A's of the Cape Cod Baseball League. He was signed by the Astros as an amateur free agent in 1989, and appeared in 13 games for the big league club in 1995 and 1996. He made his debut in September 1995 after being a replacement player in spring training during the ongoing strike.
