= Jim Dougherty (baseball) =

American baseball player (born 1968)

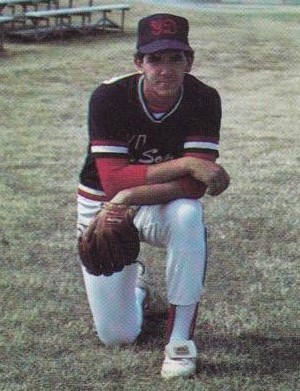
- Pitcher
- Born: March 8, 1968 (age 57); Brentwood, New York, U.S.
- Batted: Right Threw: Right

MLB debut
- April 27, 1995, for the Houston Astros

Last MLB appearance
- April 20, 1999, for the Pittsburgh Pirates

MLB statistics
- Win–loss record: 8–8
- Earned run average: 5.99
- Strikeouts: 59
- Stats at Baseball Reference

Teams
- Houston Astros (1995–1996); Oakland Athletics (1998); Pittsburgh Pirates (1999)

James Elliott Dougherty (born March 8, 1968) is an American former professional baseball pitcher. He played in Major League Baseball (MLB) from 1995 to 1999 for the Houston Astros, Oakland Athletics, and Pittsburgh Pirates.

== Amateur career ==
A native of Brentwood, New York, Dougherty attended Ross High School and the University of North Carolina at Chapel Hill. In 1988 and 1989, he played collegiate summer baseball in the Cape Cod Baseball League for the Yarmouth-Dennis Red Sox. He was selected by the Astros in the 26th round of the 1990 MLB draft.

== Professional career ==
In a four-season MLB career, Dougherty posted an 8–4 record with a 5.99 ERA, 59 strikeouts, and 94 2/3 innings without saves in 79 games.

== See also ==
- 1989 College World Series
