= Major League Baseball division winners =

List of division champions in Major League Baseball

This is a list of division champions (since 1969) and wild-card winners (since 1994) in Major League Baseball.

== Division champions ==
indicates the winner of the World Series.

=== Four-division alignment (1969–1993) ===
- Team names link to the season in which each team played

Year	AL East	AL West	NL East	NL West
1969	Baltimore	Minnesota	New York	Atlanta
1970	Baltimore	Minnesota	Pittsburgh	Cincinnati
1971	Baltimore	Oakland	Pittsburgh	San Francisco
1972	Detroit	Oakland	Pittsburgh	Cincinnati
1973	Baltimore	Oakland	New York	Cincinnati
1974	Baltimore	Oakland	Pittsburgh	Los Angeles
1975	Boston	Oakland	Pittsburgh	Cincinnati
1976	New York	Kansas City	Philadelphia	Cincinnati
1977	New York	Kansas City	Philadelphia	Los Angeles
1978	New York	Kansas City	Philadelphia	Los Angeles
1979	Baltimore	California	Pittsburgh	Cincinnati
1980	New York	Kansas City	Philadelphia	Houston
1981†	New York	Oakland	Montreal	Los Angeles
1982	Milwaukee	California	St. Louis	Atlanta
1983	Baltimore	Chicago	Philadelphia	Los Angeles
1984	Detroit	Kansas City	Chicago	San Diego
1985	Toronto	Kansas City	St. Louis	Los Angeles
1986	Boston	California	New York	Houston
1987	Detroit	Minnesota	St. Louis	San Francisco
1988	Boston	Oakland	New York	Los Angeles
1989	Toronto	Oakland	Chicago	San Francisco
1990	Boston	Oakland	Pittsburgh	Cincinnati
1991	Toronto	Minnesota	Pittsburgh	Atlanta
1992	Toronto	Oakland	Pittsburgh	Atlanta
1993	Toronto	Chicago	Philadelphia	Atlanta

† Due to the strike that took place in the middle of the 1981 season, Major League Baseball crowned both a "first half" (pre-strike) and "second half" (post-strike) division champion. The teams were then matched against each other in a special division series. Oakland and New York won the 1981 American League Division Series while Los Angeles and Montreal won the 1981 National League Division Series.

=== Six-division alignment (1994–present) ===
- Team names link to the season in which each team played

Year	AL East	AL Central	AL West	NL East	NL Central	NL West
1994	Postseason canceled due to 1994–95 Major League Baseball strike					
1995	Boston	Cleveland	Seattle	Atlanta	Cincinnati	Los Angeles
1996	New York	Cleveland	Texas	Atlanta	St. Louis	San Diego
1997	Baltimore	Cleveland	Seattle	Atlanta	Houston	San Francisco
1998	New York	Cleveland	Texas	Atlanta	Houston	San Diego
1999	New York	Cleveland	Texas	Atlanta	Houston	Arizona
2000	New York	Chicago	Oakland	Atlanta	St. Louis	San Francisco
2001	New York	Cleveland	Seattle	Atlanta	Houston	Arizona
2002	New York	Minnesota	Oakland	Atlanta	St. Louis	Arizona
2003	New York	Minnesota	Oakland	Atlanta	Chicago	San Francisco
2004	New York	Minnesota	Anaheim	Atlanta	St. Louis	Los Angeles
2005	New York	Chicago	Los Angeles	Atlanta	St. Louis	San Diego
2006	New York	Minnesota	Oakland	New York	St. Louis	San Diego
2007	Boston	Cleveland	Los Angeles	Philadelphia	Chicago	Arizona
2008	Tampa Bay	Chicago	Los Angeles	Philadelphia	Chicago	Los Angeles
2009	New York	Minnesota	Los Angeles	Philadelphia	St. Louis	Los Angeles
2010	Tampa Bay	Minnesota	Texas	Philadelphia	Cincinnati	San Francisco
2011	New York	Detroit	Texas	Philadelphia	Milwaukee	Arizona
2012	New York	Detroit	Oakland	Washington	Cincinnati	San Francisco
2013	Boston	Detroit	Oakland	Atlanta	St. Louis	Los Angeles
2014	Baltimore	Detroit	Los Angeles	Washington	St. Louis	Los Angeles
2015	Toronto	Kansas City	Texas	New York	St. Louis	Los Angeles
2016	Boston	Cleveland	Texas	Washington	Chicago	Los Angeles
2017	Boston	Cleveland	Houston	Washington	Chicago	Los Angeles
2018	Boston	Cleveland	Houston	Atlanta	Milwaukee	Los Angeles
2019	New York	Minnesota	Houston	Atlanta	St. Louis	Los Angeles
2020	Tampa Bay	Minnesota	Oakland	Atlanta	Chicago	Los Angeles
2021	Tampa Bay	Chicago	Houston	Atlanta	Milwaukee	San Francisco
2022	New York	Cleveland	Houston	Atlanta	St. Louis	Los Angeles
2023	Baltimore	Minnesota	Houston	Atlanta	Milwaukee	Los Angeles
2024	New York	Cleveland	Houston	Philadelphia	Milwaukee	Los Angeles
2025	Toronto	Cleveland	Seattle	Philadelphia	Milwaukee	Los Angeles
2026	Tampa Bay	Cleveland	Houston	Atlanta	Milwaukee	Los Angeles

=== Division titles by franchise ===
Team	Titles	Years won
Atlanta Braves	24	1969, 1982, 1991, 1992, 1993, 1995, 1996, 1997, 1998, 1999, 2000, 2001, 2002, 2003, 2004, 2005, 2013, 2018, 2019, 2020, 2021, 2022, 2023, 2026
Los Angeles Dodgers	24	1974, 1977, 1978, 1981, 1983, 1985, 1988, 1995, 2004, 2008, 2009, 2013, 2014, 2015, 2016, 2017, 2018, 2019, 2020, 2022, 2023, 2024, 2025, 2026
New York Yankees	21	1976, 1977, 1978, 1980, 1981, 1996, 1998, 1999, 2000, 2001, 2002, 2003, 2004, 2005, 2006, 2009, 2011, 2012, 2019, 2022, 2024
Athletics	17	1971, 1972, 1973, 1974, 1975, 1981, 1988, 1989, 1990, 1992, 2000, 2002, 2003, 2006, 2012, 2013, 2020
St. Louis Cardinals	15	1982, 1985, 1987, 1996, 2000, 2002, 2004, 2005, 2006, 2009, 2013, 2014, 2015, 2019, 2022
Cleveland Guardians	14	1995, 1996, 1997, 1998, 1999, 2001, 2007, 2016, 2017, 2018, 2022, 2024, 2025, 2026
Houston Astros	14	1980, 1986, 1997, 1998, 1999, 2001, 2017, 2018, 2019, 2021, 2022, 2023, 2024, 2026
Minnesota Twins	13	1969, 1970, 1987, 1991, 2002, 2003, 2004, 2006, 2009, 2010, 2019, 2020, 2023
Philadelphia Phillies	13	1976, 1977, 1978, 1980, 1983, 1993, 2007, 2008, 2009, 2010, 2011, 2024, 2025
Baltimore Orioles	10	1969, 1970, 1971, 1973, 1974, 1979, 1983, 1997, 2014, 2023
Boston Red Sox	10	1975, 1986, 1988, 1990, 1995, 2007, 2013, 2016, 2017, 2018
Cincinnati Reds	10	1970, 1972, 1973, 1975, 1976, 1979, 1990, 1995, 2010, 2012
Los Angeles Angels	9	1979, 1982, 1986, 2004, 2005, 2007, 2008, 2009, 2014
Pittsburgh Pirates	9	1970, 1971, 1972, 1974, 1975, 1979, 1990, 1991, 1992
San Francisco Giants	9	1971, 1987, 1989, 1997, 2000, 2003, 2010, 2012, 2021
Chicago Cubs	8	1984, 1989, 2003, 2007, 2008, 2016, 2017, 2020
Milwaukee Brewers	8	1982, 2011, 2018, 2021, 2023, 2024, 2025, 2026
Detroit Tigers	7	1972, 1984, 1987, 2011, 2012, 2013, 2014
Kansas City Royals	7	1976, 1977, 1978, 1980, 1984, 1985, 2015
Texas Rangers	7	1996, 1998, 1999, 2010, 2011, 2015, 2016
Toronto Blue Jays	7	1985, 1989, 1991, 1992, 1993, 2015, 2025
Chicago White Sox	6	1983, 1993, 2000, 2005, 2008, 2021
New York Mets	6	1969, 1973, 1986, 1988, 2006, 2015
Arizona Diamondbacks	5	1999, 2001, 2002, 2007, 2011
San Diego Padres	5	1984, 1996, 1998, 2005, 2006
Tampa Bay Rays	5	2008, 2010, 2020, 2021, 2026
Washington Nationals	5	1981, 2012, 2014, 2016, 2017
Seattle Mariners	4	1995, 1997, 2001, 2025
Colorado Rockies	0	none
Miami Marlins	0	none

== Wild card winners ==
indicates the winner of the World Series.

=== One Wild Card (1995–2011) ===
- **Team names link to the season in which each team played**

Year	AL	NL
1994	Postseason canceled	
1995	New York	Colorado
1996	Baltimore	Los Angeles
1997	New York	Florida
1998	Boston	Chicago
1999	Boston	New York
2000	Seattle	New York
2001	Oakland	St. Louis
2002	Anaheim	San Francisco
2003	Boston	Florida
2004	Boston	Houston
2005	Boston	Houston
2006	Detroit	Los Angeles
2007	New York	Colorado
2008	Boston	Milwaukee
2009	Boston	Colorado
2010	New York	Atlanta
2011	Tampa Bay	St. Louis

=== Two Wild Cards (2012–2019, 2021) ===
- **Winner of the Wild Card Game in bold**

Year	AL Host	AL Visitor	NL Host	NL Visitor
2012	Texas	**Baltimore**	Atlanta	**St. Louis**
2013	Cleveland	**Tampa Bay**	**Pittsburgh**	Cincinnati
2014	**Kansas City**	Oakland	Pittsburgh	**San Francisco**
2015	New York	**Houston**	Pittsburgh	**Chicago**
2016	**Toronto**	Baltimore	New York	**San Francisco**
2017	**New York**	Minnesota	**Arizona**	Colorado
2018	**New York**	Oakland	Chicago	**Colorado**
2019	Oakland	**Tampa Bay**	**Washington**	Milwaukee
2020†	Format not used			
2021	**Boston**	New York	**Los Angeles**	St. Louis

† For the 2020 season, the postseason consisted of eight teams per league; the top two teams in each division and two wild card teams from among the remaining teams.

=== Three Wild Cards (2022–present) ===
- **Winner of the Wild Card Series in bold**

Year	AL #1	AL #2	AL #3	NL #1	NL #2	NL #3
2022	Toronto	**Seattle**	Tampa Bay	New York	**San Diego**	**Philadelphia**
2023	Tampa Bay	**Texas**	Toronto	**Philadelphia**	Miami	**Arizona**
2024	Baltimore	**Kansas City**	**Detroit**	**San Diego**	Atlanta	**New York**
2025	**New York**	Boston	**Detroit**	**Chicago**	San Diego	Cincinnati
2026	**New York**	Boston	**Chicago**	**San Diego**	Chicago	Philadelphia

=== Wild Card berths by franchise ===
Team	Wild Cards	Years
New York Yankees	11	1995, 1997, 2007, 2010, 2015, 2017, 2018, 2020, 2021, 2025, 2026
Boston Red Sox	10	1998, 1999, 2003, 2004, 2005, 2008, 2009, 2021, 2025, 2026
Chicago Cubs	5	1998, 2015, 2018, 2025, 2026
Colorado Rockies	5	1995, 2007, 2009, 2017, 2018
New York Mets	5	1999, 2000, 2016, 2022, 2024
San Diego Padres	5	2020, 2022, 2024, 2025, 2026
St. Louis Cardinals	5	2001, 2011, 2012, 2020, 2021
Tampa Bay Rays	5	2011, 2013, 2019, 2022, 2023
Athletics	4	2001, 2014, 2018, 2019
Baltimore Orioles	4	1996, 2012, 2016, 2024
Houston Astros	4	2004, 2005, 2015, 2020
Miami Marlins	4	1997, 2003, 2020, 2023
Toronto Blue Jays	4	2016, 2020, 2022, 2023
Atlanta Braves	3	2010, 2012, 2024
Cincinnati Reds	3	2013, 2020, 2025
Detroit Tigers	3	2006, 2024, 2025
Los Angeles Dodgers	3	1996, 2006, 2021
Milwaukee Brewers	3	2008, 2019, 2020
Philadelphia Phillies	3	2022, 2023, 2026
Pittsburgh Pirates	3	2013, 2014, 2015
San Francisco Giants	3	2002, 2014, 2016
Arizona Diamondbacks	2	2017, 2023
Chicago White Sox	2	2020, 2026
Cleveland Guardians	2	2013, 2020
Kansas City Royals	2	2014, 2024
Seattle Mariners	2	2000, 2022
Texas Rangers	2	2012, 2023
Los Angeles Angels	1	2002
Minnesota Twins	1	2017
Washington Nationals	1	2019

== See also ==
- AL pennant winners
- NL pennant winners
- World Series champions
- MLB postseason
- MLB postseason teams
- MLB franchise postseason droughts
- MLB rivalries
- Home advantage
