= John Cangelosi =

American baseball player (born 1963)

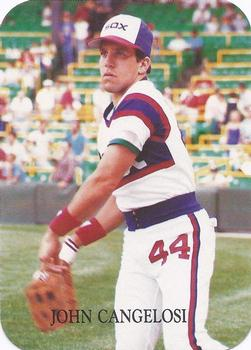
- Outfielder
- Born: March 10, 1963 (age 62); Brooklyn, New York, U.S.
- Batted: Switch Threw: Left

MLB debut
- June 3, 1985, for the Chicago White Sox

Last MLB appearance
- September 22, 1999, for the Colorado Rockies

MLB statistics
- Batting average: .250
- Home runs: 12
- Runs batted in: 134
- Stats at Baseball Reference

Teams
- Chicago White Sox (1985–1986); Pittsburgh Pirates (1987–1990); Texas Rangers (1992); New York Mets (1994); Houston Astros (1995–1996); Florida Marlins (1997–1998); Colorado Rockies (1999)

Career highlights and awards
- World Series champion (1997)

John Anthony Cangelosi (born March 10, 1963) is an American former professional baseball outfielder. He played in Major League Baseball for the Chicago White Sox, Pittsburgh Pirates, Texas Rangers, New York Mets, Houston Astros, Florida Marlins and Colorado Rockies. Cangelosi was born in Brooklyn, New York. He graduated from Miami Springs High School in Miami Springs, Florida.

== Career ==
=== Minor leagues ===
Cangelosi spent his minor league time with the Niagara Falls Sox, the Mexico City Red Devils, and the Buffalo Bisons.

=== Chicago White Sox 1985–1986 ===
Cangelosi was the surprise of the White Sox' 1986 spring camp when he displaced Rudy Law and Daryl Boston to win the center field job. He stole 50 bases for the White Sox as a rookie in 1986, an American League rookie record at the time. On March 27, 1987, he was traded by the White Sox to the Pittsburgh Pirates for Jim Winn.

=== Pittsburgh Pirates 1987–1990 ===
Dealt to Pittsburgh in 1987, Cangelosi batted .275, mostly pinch hitting, and on September 15 he became the first Pirate in 21 years to steal home. He became the first major league hitter ever to face Randy Johnson, on September 15, 1988.

=== Chicago White Sox/Milwaukee Brewers 1991 ===
Cangelosi was a non-roster invitee to spring training for the Chicago White Sox in 1991. After a difficult decision (he batted over .400), he was one of the final cuts before the regular season. He was offered a minor league contract based on his impressive showing in spring training. On May 23, 1991, he was traded by the Chicago White Sox to the Milwaukee Brewers for Esteban Beltre.

=== Texas Rangers 1992 ===
Cangelosi hit .247 in 85 games for the Rangers in 1992. He stole six bases, while being caught stealing five times.

=== New York Mets 1994 ===
Cangelosi signed with the New York Mets as a free agent on November 17, 1993. He played 24 games in left field, 19 games in right field and 13 games in center field for the Mets in 1994. He was released by the club on July 8, 1994.

=== Houston Astros 1995–1996 ===
Cangelosi stole 21 bases for the Astros in 1995, the most in his career since 1987 with the Pirates. He also stole 17 for the Astros in 1996.

=== Florida Marlins 1997–1998 ===
On July 21, 1997, he became the first position player ever to pitch for the Florida Marlins. He was a member of the team that won the World Series in 1997.

=== Colorado Rockies 1999 ===
He only played in 7 games for the Rockies. His only hit in 1999 was a double on September 17 against the Dodgers. It was John's last major league hit. His last game was on September 22, 1999, against the Diamondbacks.

== See also ==
- List of Major League Baseball career stolen bases leaders
