= Jeff Tabaka =

American baseball player (born 1964)

- Pitcher
- Born: January 17, 1964 (age 61); Barberton, Ohio, U.S.
- Batted: Right Threw: Left

MLB debut
- April 19, 1994, for the Pittsburgh Pirates

Last MLB appearance
- October 5, 2001, for the St. Louis Cardinals

MLB statistics
- Win–loss record: 6–5
- Earned run average: 4.31
- Strikeouts: 119
- Stats at Baseball Reference

Teams
- Pittsburgh Pirates (1994); San Diego Padres (1994–1995); Houston Astros (1995–1996); Cincinnati Reds (1997); Pittsburgh Pirates (1998); St. Louis Cardinals (2001)

Jeffrey Jon Tabaka (born January 17, 1964) is an American former professional baseball player who pitched in the Major Leagues from 1994 to 2001.

Tabaka graduated from Copley High School in Copley, Ohio and played collegiately at Kent State University from 1983-1986. He was drafted by the Montreal Expos in the second round of the 1986 amateur draft. In his six seasons in the major leagues he pitched for the Pittsburgh Pirates, San Diego Padres, Houston Astros, Cincinnati Reds, and St. Louis Cardinals.
