= Ricky Gutiérrez =

American baseball player (born 1970)

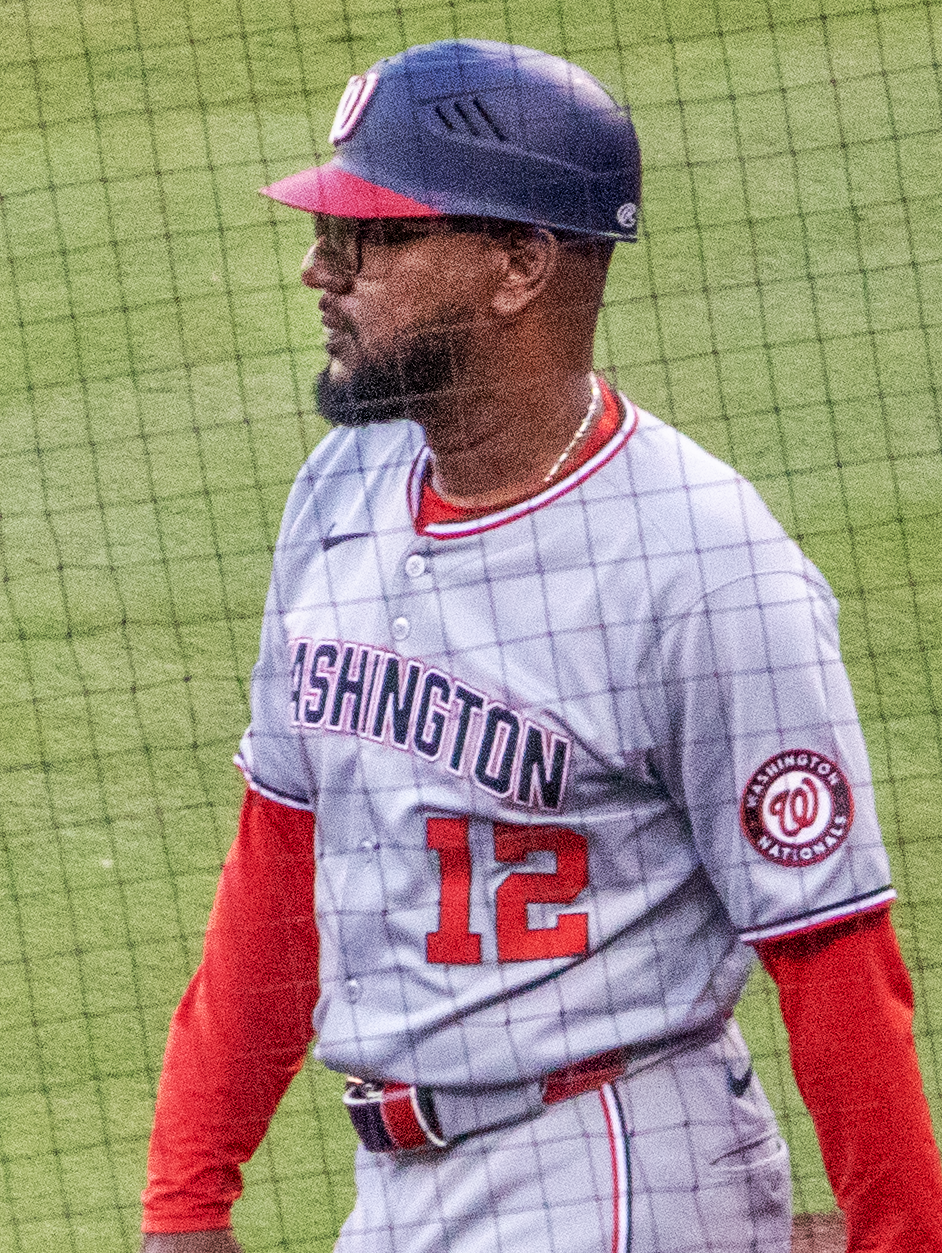
- Gutiérrez with the Washington Nationals
- Shortstop
- Born: May 23, 1970 (age 56); Miami, Florida, U.S.
- Batted: Right Threw: Right

MLB debut
- April 13, 1993, for the San Diego Padres

Last MLB appearance
- October 3, 2004, for the Boston Red Sox

MLB statistics
- Batting average: .266
- Home runs: 38
- Runs batted in: 357
- Stats at Baseball Reference

Teams
- As player: San Diego Padres (1993–1994); Houston Astros (1995–1999); Chicago Cubs (2000–2001); Cleveland Indians (2002–2003); New York Mets (2004); Boston Red Sox (2004); As coach: Washington Nationals (2024–2025)

Ricardo Gutiérrez (born May 23, 1970) is an American former shortstop in Major League Baseball (MLB) who played from 1993 through 2004 for the San Diego Padres (1993–1994), Houston Astros (1995–1999), Chicago Cubs (2000–2001), Cleveland Indians (2002–2003), New York Mets (2004), and Boston Red Sox (2004). He batted and threw right-handed. He was also the only Houston Astros player to get a base hit in Kerry Wood's 20-strikeout game.

== Background ==
Gutiérrez was the Baltimore Orioles' second pick in the 1988 MLB draft, the second of four compensatory supplemental selections between the first two rounds (28th overall). After falling behind Manny Alexander on the organization's depth chart at shortstop, Gutiérrez was sent to San Diego on September 4, 1992 to complete a transaction made four days earlier on August 31 when Erik Schullstrom was also dealt to the Padres for Craig Lefferts. Listed at 6'1", 195 pounds, Gutiérrez started his career at shortstop and became a valuable utility player later in his career. In the field, he had decent range and an above-average arm. He was a sharp line-drive hitter, and spent most of his career in the National League.

His most productive season came in 2001 with the Cubs, when he posted career highs in batting average (.290), RBI (66), runs (76), hits (153) and games played (147). He finished the year leading the National League in sacrifice hits (17). He also had the fourth-most sacrifice flies in the league (11), and was tenth in singles (117).

== Boston Red Sox ==
On July 21, 2004, the Boston Red Sox acquired Gutiérrez from the Chicago Cubs for a player to be named later or cash considerations. Red Sox General Manager Theo Epstein lauded Gutiérrez as "a veteran with a tremendous makeup ... he'll fit in well as a utility guy for us." Gutiérrez wore number 16, the same number as other Red Sox players such as Jim Lonborg, Hank Johnson, Dave Sax and Bob Zupcic. His greatest offensive performance came on August 28, 2004 versus the Detroit Tigers. Gutiérrez, who filled in at second base while Mark Bellhorn took over at third for Bill Mueller, went 3 for 4 with a two-run single with the bases loaded in the fifth inning. Teammate Alan Embree was in awe: "He's been sitting a long time, to come off the bench and contribute like he did tonight was incredible."

After winning the World Series, Gutiérrez carried an industrial-sized broom to remind victory parade goers of the final tally (a 4–0 "sweep" of the St. Louis Cardinals). While with the Red Sox, Gutiérrez was a .275 hitter (11-for-40) with 3 RBI in 21 games, including 6 runs, 1 double, 1 stolen base, and a .310 on-base percentage. The Red Sox were 14–7 in games in which Gutiérrez appeared. Over an 11-season career, Gutiérrez was a .268 hitter (967-for-3632) with 38 home runs and 357 RBI in 1074 games, including 463 runs, 138 doubles, 25 triples, 49 stolen bases, and a .338 on-base percentage.

== Coaching career ==
In 2026, Gutierrez was named Manager for the Daytona Tortugas the Single-A affiliate of the Cincinnati Reds.

== Personal life ==
Gutiérrez's nephew, James Jones, played in the National Basketball Association, and currently serves as the general manager for the Phoenix Suns. Gutiérrez is currently the third base coach of the Washington Nationals.

== See also ==
- List of Cuban Americans

== Sources ==
- The ESPN Baseball Encyclopedia – Gary Gillette, Peter Gammons, Pete Palmer. Publisher: Sterling Publishing, 2005. Format: Paperback, 1824pp. Language: English. ISBN 1-4027-4771-3
- Career statistics from Baseball Reference · Retrosheet · Baseball Almanac
- 2004 Gamelogs
