= Orlando Miller =

Panamanian baseball player (born 1969)

- Shortstop
- Born: January 13, 1969 (age 57); Changuinola, Panama
- Batted: Right Threw: Right

Professional debut
- MLB: July 8, 1994, for the Houston Astros
- CPBL: May 20, 2001, for the Chinatrust Whales

Last appearance
- MLB: September 15, 1997, for the Detroit Tigers
- CPBL: September 20, 2001, for the Chinatrust Whales

MLB statistics
- Batting average: .259
- Home runs: 24
- Runs batted in: 113

CPBL statistics
- Batting average: .308
- Home runs: 9
- Runs batted in: 32
- Stats at Baseball Reference

Teams
- Houston Astros (1994–1996); Detroit Tigers (1997); Chinatrust Whales (2001)

Orlando Miller Salmon (born January 13, 1969) is a Panamanian former professional baseball player who played in Major League Baseball primarily as a shortstop from 1994 to 1997.

== Career ==
Orlando Miller got his pro career started in the minor leagues in 1988 after signing with the New York Yankees. After a trade to the Houston organization, Miller saw playing time with both the Jackson Generals of the class double "A" Texas League and with the Osceola Astros of the class "A" Florida State League in 1991. Miller returned to Jackson in 1992, moving up to triple "A" with the Tucson Toros of the Pacific Coast League later in the season. Miller played for the Toros once again in 1993 before his big break into the major leagues with the Houston Astros in 1994. He played for the Astros for two more seasons, then finished his MLB career with the Detroit Tigers in 1997.

Miller continued to play in the minor leagues for eleven more seasons, including stints with the Mexican League's Guerreros de Oaxaca in 2000 and Olmecas de Tabasco in 2002. He played for the independent American Association's Sioux Falls Canaries in 2007, and finished his minor league career with the Edmonton Cracker-Cats in 2008.

== See also ==
- Houston Astros award winners and league leaders
