= 1976 Houston Astros season =

15th season in Major League Baseball for the Houston Astros

1976 Houston Astros
- League: National League
- Division: West
- Ballpark: Astrodome
- City: Houston, Texas
- Record: 80–82 (.494)
- Divisional place: 3rd
- Owners: Roy Hofheinz
- General managers: Tal Smith
- Managers: Bill Virdon
- Television: KPRC-TV
- Radio: KPRC (AM) (Gene Elston, Loel Passe, Bob Prince)

The 1976 Houston Astros season was the 15th season for the Major League Baseball (MLB) franchise located in Houston, Texas, their 12th as the Astros, 15th in the National League (NL), eighth in the NL West division, and 12th at The Astrodome. They entered the season as having tied for the most losses in franchise history, at the time, with a 65–97 record, and the most games behind first place, 43 1/2 behind the division-champion and World Series-winning Cincinnati Reds.

On April 8, J. R. Richard made his first of five consecutive Opening Day starts for Houston, at Riverfront Stadium to face Cincinnati, but were defeated, 11–5. The Astros attained an all-time franchise record 25 hits on May 30. (Note: Since tied multiple times. Through 2025.) The Astros' first-round selection in the amateur draft was left-handed pitcher Floyd Bannister at first overall, Houston's first-ever number one overall draft pick. During the eighth round of the draft, Houston selected right-hander Dave Smith. On July 9, Larry Dierker tossed the fifth no-hitter in franchise history, a 6–0 win over the Montreal Expos.

Center fielder César Cedeño and pitcher Ken Forsch were selected to the MLB All-Star Game; it was the fourth time Cedeño and first for Forsch. Pitcher Robin Roberts, who briefly played for Houston in 1965 and 1966, became the first former Astro to be inducted into the Baseball Hall of Fame.

On August 9, Cedeño hit for the cycle at Busch Memorial Stadium, the second of two he hit for the Astros, highlighting a 13–4 win over the St. Louis Cardinals. Cedeño at the time had been the only Houston Astro to hit for the cycle.

The Astros concluded the regular season third in the NL West with a record of 80–82, 22 games behind Cincinnati, who repeated as World Series champions. Cedeño also won his fifth career Gold Glove Award following the season.

== Offseason ==
The Astros concluded the 1975 campaign with a record of 64–97–1 (.398), in sixth and last place in the NL West, 43 1/2 behind the division-champion and World Series-winning Cincinnati Reds. Their record dropped by 16 losses from 1974, tying a then-club record for losses, first set in 1965. Center fielder César Cedeño won a fourth consecutive Gold Glove Award, joining former teammate Doug Rader to have won at least as many, winnning five consecutively at third base.

Transactions

- October 24, 1975: The Astros traded players to be named later to the Cincinnati Reds for Joaquín Andújar. The Astros completed the trade by sending Luis Sánchez and Carlos Alfonso (minors) to the Reds on December 12.
- December 6, 1975: The Astros sent Milt May, Dave Roberts and Jim Crawford to the Detroit Tigers for Leon Roberts, Terry Humphrey, Gene Pentz and Mark Lemongello.

Exhibition play

The Astros participated in the first-ever baseball game ever hosted at the Louisiana Superdome, in New Orleans, on April 6, 1976, matching up against the Minnesota Twins. Built for American football, the new stadium was the home of the New Orleans Saints of the National Football League (NFL). In front of just over 10,000 fans, the Astros defeated the Twins, 10–5. Cliff Johnson propelled Houston's offense with three hits, including blasting a home run. Not engineered for baseball, primary issues included a concrete warning track, gridiron sidelines down third base, and poor visibility led to a scoreboard being shut off.

== Regular season ==
=== Summary ===
==== April ====
Opening Day starting lineup
Uniform	Player	Position
26	Wilbur Howard	Left fielder
23	Enos Cabell	Third baseman
28	César Cedeño	Center fielder
27	Bob Watson	First baseman
6	Cliff Johnson	Catcher
21	Greg Gross	Right fielder
10	Larry Milbourne	Second baseman
14	Roger Metzger	Shortstop
50	J. R. Richard	Pitcher
Venue: Riverfront Stadium • Cincinnati 11, Houston 5 Sources:

The Cincinnati Reds hosted the Astros at Riverfront Stadium for Opening Day on April 8. J. R. Richard made his first career Opening Day start, which lasted four innings as he gave up four runs. Rookie José Sosa relieved and was ambushed for six hits and five runs over just one inning. Former Astro Joe Morgan collected three hits and scored three runs. During the top of the sixth, César Cedeño and Bob Watson connected for successive home runs off Reds starter Gary Nolan to highlight the Astros offense. However, Cincinnati took the opener, 11–5. Enos Cabell became just the third player to start at third base on Opening Day for Houston. Cabell succeeded Bob Aspromonte, who started each of the first seven in club history (1962 to 1968), and Doug Rader, who started each of the next seven (1969 to 1975).

Twice of behalf of Ken Forsch's efforts on April 15, the Astros were rescued from reversal by the San Diego Padres. With Houston leading 5–4 in the ninth inning and the tying runner aboard, Forsch induced Ted Kubiak to ground to second for the inevitable end to the contest, except that catcher Cliff Johnson was checked for interference, awarding Kubiak first base. Now facing Merv Rettenmund, Forsch induced a fly ball to Greg Gross in right field that he converted to the final out to polish off the victory.

From April 17 to May 14, César Cedeño authored a career-high 19-game hitting streak, batting .378. Infused with consistency, Cedeño tallied nine multi-hit games, none with more than two. He also swatted five home runs, collected 19 runs batted in (RBI) eight stolen bases, .662 slugging percentage (SLG) and 1.080 on-base plus slugging percentage (OPS). The following year, he aggregated another streak of 22, from August 25—September 21, 1977, making him the only player in club history with two hitting streaks each of 19 games or more.

On April 21, J. R. Richard tossed the first 10 innings of a 16-inning, eventual 1–0 shutout of the Los Angeles Dodgers. Richard struck out seven, walked three and allowed four hits for a game score of 88, his highest of the season. José Cruz, who had pinch hit for Richard in the bottom of the 10th, roped a walk-off single off Stan Wall to score Larry Milbourne in the bottom of the 16th inning. Mike Barlow, who entered for Houston for the final inning, picked up his second victory. This was the Astros' longest game of the season in terms of innings played and second longest by time.

==== May ====
On May 7, J. R. Richard tossed a complete game six-hitter against the St. Louis Cardinals to lead 3–1 Astros victory. Richard registered a game score of 71, six walks and six strikeouts. José Cruz propelled the offense with 2 hits and 2 RBI, Roger Metzger and Wilbur Wood each added two hits and Richard added an insurance run with a sacrifice fly.

Houston's catching corps combined to hit for the cycle on May 9 at Busch Memorial Stadium during a 10–5 beating of St. Louis. Johnson pounded four hits—including two singles, a double and a home run—before spraining his ankle. Backup Skip Jutze completed the effort with a triple in the seventh inning. Meanwhile, Enos Cabell turned four at bats into three hits. Gross drew a base on balls in each of his four plate appearances. José Cruz smashed his first double of the season. The Astros piled on 13 hits while striking out just once. Larry Dierker (4–3) added another hit and hurled eight solid innings, yielding seven hits and two runs.

On May 29, Joe Niekro faced brother and fellow knuckleball hurler Phil for the first bout in team history where one player pitched against his brother. Joe led the Astros to a 4–3 triumph over Phil and the Atlanta Braves. With this win, Joe improved his career record against his brother to 3–2. Nine years earlier, as a member of the Chicago Cubs, Joe had pitched against Phil for the first time, but suffered an 8–3 defeat to the Braves on July 4, 1967. That was the first MLB contest to feature two brothers pitch against each other since Jesse Barnes opposed Virgil on September 11, 1926. The Barnes brothers formed the first four such pitching matchups, but the Niekros hold the major league record with nine total such matchups. Moreover, the only home run hit by Joe Niekro during his 21-year major league career occurred on May 29, when he connected off his brother, Phil. The drive took place in the seventh inning off a knuckleball during an Astros' 4–3 win over the Atlanta Braves.

During the second game of a May 30 doubleheader later that same series, Houston set a club record with 25 hits for a 16–5 defeat of Atlanta. (Note: The prior team record was 23 hits on June 7, 1967. Tied multiple times, starting July 2 (Game 2), and next on August 10, 2019. Criteria: For single games, from 1962 to 2026, for HOU, in the regular season, requiring hits ≥18, sorted by descending hits.) Twenty-three of the hits were singles, and Jerry DaVanon led the Astros with five runs batted in (RBI) and Cliff Johnson doubled and led Houston with four hits.

==== June—July ====
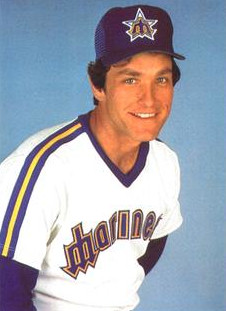
Pitcher Floyd Bannister, depicted as a member of the Seattle Mariners

Holding their first-ever first overall pick in the MLB draft, on June 8, Houston selected pitcher Floyd Bannister from Arizona State University. Bannister received a signing bonus of $100,000 (USD, $565.8 thousand today), at the time, tied for second-highest bonus conferred to a number 1 pick. (Note: The Astros' next number one draft pick was Phil Nevin in 1992.) He would pitch 15 seasons in the major leagues, highlighted by an All-Star selection and the American League strikeout title in 1982. On the field, meanwhile, Larry Dierker blanked St. Louis, 2–0, on just five hits, three walks, and nine strikeouts, qualifying a game score of 83. On the basepaths, Dierker scratched through both of the Astros' runs via a single and an error during plays involving at bats by Bob Watson.

With flooding in Greater Houston, the Astros were forced to cancel their game on June 15, 1976, against the Pittsburgh Pirates. This became the first and remained the only rainout that ever occurred in the 35 seasons that the team played at the Astrodome. To pick up their rain checks, some fans resorted to riding in canoes in 7 inches (18 cm) of rain to travel to the stadium.

During a doubleheader in Cincinnati on July 2, César Cedeño took center stage by driving in both game-winners to seal the sweep, while going 7-for-11, and singling for his 1,000th career hit. Houston racked up 25 hits during the opener, which tied the club record established just one month earlier on May 30. Cedeño, Greg Gross, and Enos Cabell each grooved four hits. Meanwhile, Pete Rose had five hits for the Reds, and Joe Morgan coaxed four walks. In the 14th inning, Cedeño crushed a two-run blast off Rich Hinton to break the tie and give the Astros a 9–7 lead, retaining difference in a 10–8 final. Cedeño doubled twice among three hits in the nightcap. In the eighth inning, he doubled in Cabell off Fred Norman for the decisive run and 3–2 Astros triumph.

Navigating 10 bases on balls issued and eight hits on July 6, J. R. Richard prevailed to lock down a 10-inning, 1–0 complete-game shutout of the New York Mets. In the bottom of the 10th inning, Jerry DaVanon singled home Wilbur Howard to cap the walk-off win. This victory commenced a span of eight starts through August 4 during which the hurler crafted a 0.90 earned run average (ERA), was 6–2 over 69 2/3 innings pitched, with 42 hits surrendered, 41 walks and 43 strikeouts.

==== Larry Dierker's no-hitter ====
Larry Dierker tossed a no-hitter on July 9, a 6–0 triumph over the Montreal Expos. He struck out eight, walked four, and posted a game score of 91. Ed Herrmann, who served as Dierker's batterymate, homered in the fourth inning. The first no-hitter ever pitched against the Expos, (Note: Bill Stoneman had fired two no-hitters for the Expos, the first two such contests they were involved in.) this was Dierker's fifth career shutout of two hits or fewer. Dierker had taken two prior no-hit bids into the ninth inning, including one for a perfect game on September 30, 1966, and another no-hit bid on September 13, 1969. His 137th win, at the time of his crowning achievement, Dierker was the Astros' franchise leader in nearly every pitching category.

Hermann led a balanced offensive approach by reaching base thrice via two hits and one walk. Bob Watson and Roger Metzger added two hits and one walk each, while José Cruz collected two hits. Dierker chipped in an RBI via a sacrifice fly. The Astros collected 11 base hits and four walks in total.

The most recent no-hitter for Houston had been by Don Wilson on May 1, 1969, 4–0 triumph over Cincinnati. The next no-hitter by Astros pitching transpired on April 7, 1979, by Ken Forsch in a 6–0 win over the Atlanta Braves.

==== MLB All-Star Game ====
Center fielder César Cedeño and pitcher Ken Forsch were selected to the MLB All-Star Game, hosted at Veterans Stadium. Cedeño became Houston's first player to homer at an All-Star Game, blasting a two-run shot off Frank Tanana to score Ken Griffey and punctuate a 7–1 National League victory. Forsch closed out the contest with a scoreless ninth. His fourth selection, Cedeño matched Turk Farrell—also the Colt .45s/Astros first-ever All-Star—for most in club history. This stood as club record until Craig Biggio would receive his fifth selection in the 1996 All-Star Game. Moreover, Biggio joined Cedeño in 1995 as the next Astro to homer during the Midsummer Classic.

==== Rest of July ====
On July 18, catcher Ed Herrmann served as the impetus for Houston to sweep a doubleheader of the Expos by tallies of 7–6 and 10–1. Herrmann authored a 7-for-10 performance, including a home run and 7 RBI. In the opener, which lasted 10 innings, Hermmann delivered a 5-for-5 performance. During the nightcap, Greg Gross connected on a 4-for-4 contest as Houston's offense sprinted to a 22-hit lambasting. Dan Larson tossed a complete game in his big league debut. (Note: Not to be confused with Don Larsen, who tossed a perfect game in the 1956 World Series, and later pitched for the Colt .45s/Astros in 1964 and 1965.)

Making his second major league start, on July 25, Bo McLaughlin fired a 10-inning shutout of the San Francisco Giants and got the win. Greg Gross plated Wilbur Howard via a walk-off sacrifice fly to win it, 1–0, with two out in the bottom of the 10th.

True to the renown of the Astrodome, on July 26, the Astros celebrated their 1,000th contest at the stadium with Dierker tossing a two-hit shutout for 7–0 triumph over the San Diego Padres nineteen days after no-hitting the Expos. His sixth career shutout of two hits or fewer, Dierker received a game score of 85. Bob Watson homered, doubled, and drove in three to support. Finally, Dierker's sacrifice fly in the top of the ninth punctuated an extra insurance run. The following day, Richard glazed the Padres on a four-hit complete game as Houston won, 4–1. Bob Watson blasted a home run while supplying all of the Astros' offense.

==== August ====
On August 8, J. R, Richard, having forged 37 1/3 consecutive innings without an earned run, yielded a pinch hit, game-tying three run home run to Willie McCovey of the San Diego Padres in the bottom of the eighth. The following inning, former Astro Héctor Torres singled in Tito Fuentes for the walk-off win.

==== César Cedeño's cycle ====
On August 9, César Cedeño hit for the cycle at Busch Memorial Stadium, highlighting a 13–4 win over the St. Louis Cardinals. He drew the first three hits—triple, home run, and then double—against starter and future Astro Bob Forsch, also brother of teammate Ken. The second of two cycles that Cedeño hit for the Astros, at the time he had been the only Astros player to have hit for the cycle. The next Astros cycle was by teammate Bob Watson on June 24 of the following year.

==== Rest of August ====
Also on August 9 in Cooperstown, New York, pitcher Robin Roberts became the first former Astro to be inducted into the Baseball Hall of Fame. He played for Houston in 1965 and 1966, and was named Opening Day starting pitcher for the latter campaign.

On August 14, Bob Watson hit his second career grand slam at the Astrodome, becoming just the third player with multiple grand slams at the stadium, joining teammates Doug Rader (3) and César Cedeño (2). Watson's blast came off John Candelaria in the bottom of the sixth inning, flipping a shutout deficit to a 4–2 Astros lead. However, the Pittsburgh Pirates rallied, scoring in the top of the eighth inning and twice in the top of the ninth, winning 5–4. Mario Mendoza doubled home Richie Hebner off Gene Pentz (3–3) for the Pirates' game-winning tally.

On August 20, Dan Larson iced the Philadelphia Phillies on a complete game effort, while going 3-for-4 with 4 RBI to lead Houston to an 8–3 victory. He also walloped his first major league triple. Wilbur Howard accrued three base knocks as each Astros starter logged at least one hit.

==== September—October ====
Bo McLaughlin tossed a 1–0 shutout on September 1 to outduel Jim Kaat and nip the Phillies for a club record-tying sixth complete game in a row. Cliff Johnson's solo blast provided all the offensive support that McLaughlin required. Concurrent with this achievement, Houston were also riding a season-high 7-game winning streak.

Infielder Alex Taveras his major league debut on September 9 as a pinch runner in a 4–3 loss to the Cincinnati Reds. His first official plate appearance was in the first game of a doubleheader on September 11, where collected his first major league hit in 3 at bats versus the Padres He went 43 plate appearances and 41 at bats until a contest against the Los Angeles Dodgers on September 29, before being retired via strikeout for the first time, which set a franchise record.

Bob Watson belted his 100th career home run on September 18, a solo shot off Adrian Devine leading off the top of the ninth at Atlanta–Fulton County Stadium. However, Devine retired Johnson, Leon Roberts, and Taveras in order for the save as the Atlanta Braves held on for the 5–3 win.

The Astros polished off their regular season on October 2 with aplomb, pasting the San Francisco Giants for a 10–1 victory, led by a tour-de-force performance from ace J. R. Richard. On the mound, Richard hurled a one-hit complete game, with just one walk surrendered with 13 whiffs for a game score of 87. The 13-strikeout effort tied for most in the National League that season. Richard won his last three appearances within a span of nine days to become a 20-game winner for the first time and complement a sturdy 2.75 earned run average (ERA). At the plate, Richard went 3-for-4, swatting a bomb with three RBI. Batterymate Cliff Johnson doubled and also brought two runs home. Bob Watson added two RBI, and José Cruz collected two hits, scored twice and swiped two of Houston's four bags.

==== Performance overview ====
The Astros concluded the 1976 season with an 80–82 record, in third place in the NL West and 22 games behind the dvision- and World Series-champion Cincinnati Reds. It was Houston's seventh campaign within the prior eight to have won at least 79 games. During manager Bill Virdon's first full season at the helm, Houston rebounded to improve by 15 1/2 games from the year prior.

J. R. Richard became Houston's second 20-game winner, succeeding Larry Dierker in 1969. Richard also led the NL in hits per nine innings surrendered (6.835 H/9) for the first of three times that he would do so in his career. He became the second Astros to lead the league in this category, following Don Wilson in 1971 (6.549). With 214 strikeouts, he became the first pitcher to record 200 or more in one season as a member of the Astros since Wilson (235), Dierker (232), and Tom Griffin (200) all did so in 1969. (Note: For single seasons, playing for HOU, in the regular season, requiring strikeouts ≥ 200, sorted by ascending season.)

Meanwhile, Cedeño won his fifth straight Gold Glove Award, and swiped a club-record 58 stolen bases, incrementally upping his total by one for the fourth time in five seasons. Cedeño also resumed another unique record with the fifth of six uninterrupted campaigns with 50 or more steals, thus far as the only player in club history who had produced a 50-stolen base season. (Note: For single seasons, playing for HOU, in the regular season, requiring stolen bases ≥ 50, sorted by ascending season.) The five Gold Gloves tied former teammate Doug Rader for most in franchise history, also consecutively (1970—1974). Moreover, this was also the eighth of a franchise-record nine successive campaigns featuring at least one baserunner with 40 or more stolen bases. (Note: Number of players that meet criteria in a season, playing for HOU, in the regular season, requiring stolen bases ≥ 40, sorted by ascending instances.)

=== League standings ===
==== National League West ====
NL West
Team	W	L	Pct.	GB	Home	Road
Cincinnati Reds	102	60	.630	—	49‍–‍32	53‍–‍28
Los Angeles Dodgers	92	70	.568	10	49‍–‍32	43‍–‍38
Houston Astros	80	82	.494	22	46‍–‍36	34‍–‍46
San Francisco Giants	74	88	.457	28	40‍–‍41	34‍–‍47
San Diego Padres	73	89	.451	29	42‍–‍38	31‍–‍51
Atlanta Braves	70	92	.432	32	34‍–‍47	36‍–‍45

==== Record versus opponents ====
National League

1976 National League record Sources:
Team	ATL	CHC	CIN	HOU	LAD	MON	NYM	PHI	PIT	SD	SF	STL
Atlanta	—	6–6	6–12	7–11	8–10	8–4	4–8	5–7	3–9	10–8	9–9	4–8
Chicago	6–6	—	3–9	5–7	3–9	11–7	5–13	8–10	8–10	6–6	8–4	12–6
Cincinnati	12–6	9–3	—	12–6	13–5	9–3	6–6	5–7	8–4	13–5	9–9	6–6
Houston	11–7	7–5	6–12	—	5–13	10–2	6–6	4–8	2–10	10–8	10–8	9–3
Los Angeles	10–8	9–3	5–13	13–5	—	10–2	7–5	5–7	9–3	6–12	8–10	10–2
Montreal	4–8	7–11	3–9	2–10	2–10	—	8–10	3–15	8–10	4–8	7–5	7–11
New York	8–4	13–5	6–6	6–6	5–7	10–8	—	5–13	10–8	7–5	7–5	9–9
Philadelphia	7-5	10–8	7–5	8–4	7–5	15–3	13–5	—	8–10	8–4	6–6	12–6
Pittsburgh	9–3	10–8	4–8	10–2	3–9	10–8	8–10	10–8	—	7–5	9–3	12–6
San Diego	8–10	6–6	5–13	8–10	12–6	8–4	5–7	4–8	5–7	—	8–10	4–8
San Francisco	9–9	4–8	9–9	8–10	10–8	5–7	5–7	6–6	3–9	10–8	—	5–7
St. Louis	8–4	6–12	6–6	3–9	2–10	11–7	9–9	6–12	6–12	8–4	7–5	—

=== Notable transactions ===
- June 6, 1976: Terry Humphrey and Mike Barlow were traded by the Astros to the California Angels for Ed Herrmann.

=== Roster ===
1976 Houston Astros
Roster
Pitchers: 47 Joaquín Andújar; 39 Mike Barlow; 37 Mike Cosgrove; 49 Larry Dierker; 43 Ken Forsch; 38 Tom Griffin; 42 Larry Hardy; 34 Dan Larson; 51 Mark Lemongello; 39 Bo McLaughlin; 36 Joe Niekro; 30 Gene Pentz; 50 J. R. Richard; 45 Gilberto Rondon; 35 Joe Sambito; 31 Paul Siebert; 44 José Sosa	Catchers: 8 Ed Herrmann; 6 Cliff Johnson; 9 Skip Jutze; Infielders: 11 Rob Andrews; 17 Ken Boswell; 23 Enos Cabell; 16 Jerry DaVanon; 18 Art Howe; 14 Roger Metzger; 10 Larry Milbourne; 15 Alex Taveras; 27 Bob Watson	Outfielders: 28 César Cedeño; 20 Rich Chiles; 25 José Cruz; 21 Greg Gross; 26 Wilbur Howard; 29 Al Javier; 22 Leon Roberts	Manager: 7 Bill Virdon; Coaches: 4 Deacon Jones; 5 Bob Lillis; 3 Tony Pacheco; 2 Mel Wright

== Player stats ==
= Indicates team leader

=== Batting ===
==== Starters by position ====
Note: Pos = Position; G = Games played; AB = At bats; H = Hits; Avg. = Batting average; HR = Home runs; RBI = Runs batted in

Pos	Player	G	AB	H	Avg.	HR	RBI
C	Ed Herrmann	79	265	54	.204	3	25
1B	Bob Watson	157	585	183	.313	16	102
2B	Rob Andrews	109	410	105	.256	0	23
SS	Roger Metzger	152	481	101	.210	0	29
3B	Enos Cabell	144	586	160	.273	2	43
LF	José Cruz	133	439	133	.303	4	61
CF	César Cedeño	150	575	171	.297	18	83
RF	Greg Gross	128	426	122	.286	0	27

==== Other batters ====
Note: G = Games played; AB = At bats; H = Hits; Avg. = Batting average; HR = Home runs; RBI = Runs batted in

Player	G	AB	H	Avg.	HR	RBI
Cliff Johnson	108	318	72	.226	10	49
Leon Roberts	87	235	68	.289	7	33
Wilbur Howard	94	191	42	.220	1	18
Larry Milbourne	59	145	36	.248	0	7
Ken Boswell	91	126	33	.262	0	18
Jerry DaVanon	61	107	31	.290	1	20
Skip Jutze	42	92	14	.152	0	6
Alex Taveras	14	46	10	.217	0	2
Art Howe	21	29	4	.138	0	0
Al Javier	8	24	5	.208	0	0
Rich Chiles	5	4	2	.500	0	0

=== Pitching ===
==== Starting pitchers ====
Note: G = Games pitched; IP = Innings pitched; W = Wins; L = Losses; ERA = Earned run average; SO = Strikeouts

Player	G	IP	W	L	ERA	SO
J.R. Richard	39	291.0	20	15	2.75	214
Larry Dierker	28	187.1	13	14	3.69	112
Joaquín Andújar	28	172.1	9	10	3.60	59
Dan Larson	13	92.1	5	8	3.02	42
Mike Cosgrove	22	89.2	3	4	5.52	34
Mark Lemongello	4	29.0	3	1	2.79	9

==== Other pitchers ====
Note: G = Games pitched; IP = Innings pitched; W = Wins; L = Losses; ERA = Earned run average; SO = Strikeouts

Player	G	IP	W	L	ERA	SO
Joe Niekro	36	118.0	4	8	3.36	77
Bo McLaughlin	17	79.0	4	5	2.85	32
Gilberto Rondón	19	53.2	2	2	5.70	21
Joe Sambito	20	53.1	3	2	3.54	26

==== Relief pitchers ====
Note: G = Games pitched; W = Wins; L = Losses; SV = Saves; ERA = Earned run average; SO = Strikeouts

Player	G	W	L	SV	ERA	SO
Ken Forsch	52	4	3	19	2.15	49
Gene Pentz	40	3	3	5	2.97	36
Tom Griffin	20	5	3	0	6.05	33
Paul Siebert	19	0	2	0	3.16	10
Mike Barlow	16	2	2	0	4.50	11
Larry Hardy	15	0	0	3	7.06	10
José Sosa	9	0	0	0	6.94	5

== Major League Baseball draft ==
Houston Astros 1976 MLB draft selections
Rd.	Slot	Draftee	Position	School	Origin	Signed	Notes	Bio
1	1	Floyd Bannister	Left-handed pitcher	Arizona State • 1976	(South Dakota)	Y	(Note: MLB debut on April 19, 1977, for Houston)	
2	25	Phil Klimas	Third baseman	Saint Xavier	(Illinois)	Y		
3	49	Reggie Baldwin	Catcher	Grambling State	(Louisiana)	Y	(Note: MLB debut on May 25, 1978, for Houston)	
4	73	Jim Pankovits	Third baseman	South Carolina	(Pennsylvania)	Y	(Note: MLB debut on May 27, 1984, for Houston)	
5	97	Joe Isaacs	Right-handed pitcher	Asher High	(Oklahoma)	N	(Note: Signed with the Minnesota Twins from the January 1978 draft, during the secondary phase.)	
8	169	Dave Smith	Right-handed pitcher	San Diego State	(California)	Y	(Note: MLB debut on April 11, 1980, for Houston)	
11	241	Gary Rajsich	First baseman	Arizona State • 1976	(Ohio)	Y	(Note: MLB debut on April 9, 1982, for the New York Mets)	
17	385	Bert Roberge	Right-handed pitcher	Maine • 1976	(Maine)	Y	(Note: MLB debut on May 28, 1979, for Houston)	

== Awards and achievements ==
=== Offensive achievements ===
==== Hitting for the cycle ====
Date	Player	H / AB	R	1B	2B	3B	HR	BI	Other	Score	Opponent	Box
August 9	César Cedeño	4-for-5	4	5	7	1	6	5	—	13–4	St. Louis Cardinals	
Cedeño: 2B (22) • 3B (3) • HR (16) • RBI (61)

==== Grand slams ====
No.	Date	Astros batter	Venue	Inning	Pitcher	Opposing team	Box
1	August 14	Bob Watson	Astrodome	6 (Note: Tied score or took lead)	John Candelaria	Pittsburgh Pirates	

=== No-hit game ===
Date	Pitcher	IP	BB	BR	K	BF	Catcher	Score	Opponent	Venue	Plate umpire	Box
July 9, 1976	Larry Dierker	9	4	4	8	30	Ed Herrmann	6–0	Montreal Expos	Astrodome	John McSherry	
July 9, 1976	Dierker: Game score: 91 • Win (8–8)											

=== Career honors ===
Astros elected to Baseball Hall of Fame
Individual	Position	Houston Astros career					Induction	
Individual	Position	Uni.	Seasons	Games	Start	Finish	Induction	
Robin Roberts	Starting pitcher	38	2	23	1965	1966	Class	Plaque
See also: Members of the Baseball Hall of Fame • Sources:

=== Annual awards ===
1976 Houston Astros award winners
Name of award		Recipient	Ref.
Gold Glove Award	Outfielder	César Cedeño	
Houston Astros Most Valuable Player (MVP)		J. R. Richard	
MLB All-Star Game	Reserve outfielder	César Cedeño	
MLB All-Star Game	Reserve pitcher	Ken Forsch	
National League (NL) Player of the Week	June 6	Joaquín Andújar	
National League (NL) Player of the Week	July 4	César Cedeño	
National League (NL) Player of the Week	August 1	Bob Watson	
The Sporting News NL All-Star	Outfielder	César Cedeño	

Other awards results

Name of award	Voting recipient(s) (Team)	Ref.
NL Cy Young	1st—R. Jones (SDP) • 7th—Richard (HOU)	
NL Most Valuable Player	1st—J. Morgan (CIN) • 11th—Watson (HOU); Other Astros: 17th—Richard • 25th—Cedeño	

=== League leaders ===
NL pitching leaders

- Hits per nine innings pitched (H/9): J. R. Richard (6.8)

=== Milestones ===
==== Major League debuts ====
Player—Appeared at position

- Joe Sambito, relief pitcher
Date and opponent

- July 20 at Pittsburgh
Box

Also:

== Minor league system ==
Level	Team	League	Manager
AAA	Memphis Blues	International League	Jim Beauchamp
AA	Columbus Astros	Southern League	Leo Posada
A	Dubuque Packers	Midwest League	Bob Cluck
Rookie	Covington Astros	Appalachian League	Julio Linares

== See also ==
- Black Aces
- List of first overall Major League Baseball draft picks
- List of Major League Baseball no-hitters
- List of Major League Baseball players to hit for the cycle
