= 1975 Houston Astros season =

14th season in Major League Baseball for the Houston Astros

1975 Houston Astros
- League: National League
- Division: West
- Ballpark: Astrodome
- City: Houston, Texas
- Record: 64–97–1 (.398)
- Divisional place: 6th
- Owners: Roy Hofheinz
- General managers: Spec Richardson; John Mullen; Tal Smith
- Managers: Preston Gómez: 47–80 (.370); Bill Virdon: 17–17–1 (.500)
- Television: KPRC-TV
- Radio: KPRC (AM) (Gene Elston, Loel Passe)

The 1975 Houston Astros season was the 14th season for the Major League Baseball (MLB) franchise located in Houston, Texas, their 11th as the Astros, 14th in the National League (NL), seventh in the NL West division, and 11th at The Astrodome. The Astros entered the season with a record of 81–81, in fourth place and 21 games behind the division-champion and NL pennant-winning Los Angeles Dodgers.

The regular season began on April 7 as the Astros hosted the Atlanta Braves with Larry Dierker making his fourth Opening Day start, which the Astros won, 6–2.

First baseman Bob Watson represented the Astros at the MLB All-Star Game and played for the National League, his second career selection. The Astros hired Tal Smith as general manager on August 7. With the Astros struggling to a 47–80 record, the team dismissed Preston Gómez, and replaced him on August 20 with Bill Virdon as the eighth manager in franchise history. The club went 17–17–1 the rest of the way.

The Astros finished last in the NL West with a record of 64–97–1, 43 1/2 games behind the division- and World Series-champion Cincinnati Reds, also the worst record in the National League. The second time the Astros had finished in last place, the 97 losses tied the 1965 team for most in team history, was matched in 1991, and stood as the record until 2011, when they lost at least 100 games for the first time.

Following the season, center fielder César Cedeño won his fourth career Gold Glove Award.

== Offseason ==
=== Summary ===
The Astros concluded the 1974 campaign with a record of 81–81 (.500), in fourth place in the NL West and 21 games behind the division-champion and NL pennant-winning Los Angeles Dodgers. This performance furthered a scintilla of three consecutive seasons with a record of .500, then unprecedented in franchise history. Center fielder César Cedeño extended his Major League record as a third successive entrant into the 20–50 club. Cedeño and third baseman Doug Rader each earned Gold Glove Awards, and right fielder Greg Gross was recognized as The Sporting News NL Rookie Player of the Year Award. (Note: From 1961–2003, The Sporting News declared one rookie position player and pitcher from each league, the NL and the American League (AL), for this award. Starting in 2004, this system was modified to selecting one rookie from each league for the award, regardless of position.)

On January 5, 1975, right-handed pitcher Don Wilson died at home of carbon monoxide poisoning.

=== Transactions ===
- October 24, 1974: Acquired the rights of outfielder José Cruz from the St. Louis Cardinals for cash considerations.
- December 3, 1974: Lee May and Jay Schlueter were traded by the Astros to the Baltimore Orioles for Enos Cabell and Rob Andrews.

=== Uniform changes ===
This was the first season the Astros donned their now famous rainbow uniforms. The uniforms would make slight alterations throughout the years. In 1975, the numbers on the back of the jersey were inside a white circle but by the following season, the white circle was eliminated entirely. In 1987, the rainbows were relegated to the shoulders of both home and away uniforms (prior to that they were only used on the away uniforms shoulders) and by 1994, the rainbow uniforms were retired after 19 years for a more contemporary look.

== Regular season ==
=== Summary ===
==== April ====
Plate honoring Don Wilson on the Houston Astros Wall of Honor at Daikin Park.

Opening Day starting lineup
Uniform	Player	Position
23	Enos Cabell	Left fielder
11	Rob Andrews (Note: Major league debut.)	Second baseman
28	César Cedeño	Center fielder
8	Milt May	Catcher
6	Cliff Johnson	First baseman
25	José Cruz	Right fielder
12	Doug Rader	Third baseman
14	Roger Metzger	Shortstop
49	Larry Dierker	Pitcher
Venue: Astrodome • Final: Houston 6, Atlanta 2 Sources:

On Opening Day at the Astrodome, José Cruz introduced himself in an Astros uniform with an electric debut, going 3-for-4, swatting a home run and delivering three runs batted in (RBI) to lead a 6–2 triumph over the Atlanta Braves. Cruz singled during his first Houston plate appearance in the bottom of the second inning off Braves starter Phil Niekro for his first Astros hit, and in the bottom of the fifth, slugged a three-run home run to chase Niekro. The blast put Houston in the lead, 5–2. Rob Andrews made his major league debut at second base and struck out against Niekro during his first at bat in the first inning, and the third, singled for his first major league hit. Andrews, Enos Cabell, César Cedeño, Milt May, and Doug Rader each added two hits as Houston totaled 14. Astros starter Larry Dierker went the distance and struck out 7 to pick up his first win of the season. Dierker made his then-club record fourth Opening Day start for Houston, relinquishing a tie with the prior year's starter, Dave Roberts. (Note: Dierker retained the club record until surpassed by J. R. Richard, who became Houston's Opening Day starter the following year, and made his fifth consecutive in 1980.) Meanwhile, Rader, making his seventh consecutive Opening Day start at third base, equaled Bob Aspromonte's club record for the position (1962 to 1968). (Note: Aspromonte was the only player to start on each of the first seven Opening Day contests for the Colt .45s/Astros.) José Cruz' first home run for Houston was also the first of his career on Opening Day.

On April 13, the Astros retired Don Wilson's uniform number 40. and commemorated him during the following season with a black circular patch containing his number 40 in white, which was worn on the left sleeve of the Astros "rainbow jerseys."

==== May ====
Bob Watson scored the 1,000,000th run in baseball history on May 4 during the first game of a doubleheader at Candlestick Park. In spite of Milt May's home run, Watson sprinted around the bases to cross home plate, edging ahead of Dave Concepción of the Cincinnati Reds. Meanwhile, both pitching staffs were unusually wild, issuing a record 41 bases on balls, including a single game league record of 26 in the nightcap. J. R. Richard surrendered an individual club-record eleven of the free passes; however, Houston managed to win the second game, 12–8, to obtain a split of the twinbill. Watson's prize for the historic run scored was $10,000 and one million Tootsie Rolls.

After having fallen behind on May 25 to a 6–0 score, the Astros came back in the bottom of the ninth inning to the Montreal Expos, via a leadoff home run by César Cedeño. The Expos retook the lead in the 12th inning, prior to the Astros walking it off in the bottom of the inning, 8–7.

==== Record-setting inning ====
On May 31, the Astros won out in a 15–3 onslaught over the Philadelphia Phillies, erupting for a club-record 12 runs in the eighth inning. Pinch hitter Cliff Johnson fully leveraged the opportunity, hitting a home run and double that inning, which tied a modern Major League record (since 1900) with two extra-base hits in one inning. (Note: Tom Burns holds the all-time Major League record with 3, on September 6, 1883, as a member of the Chicago White Stockings.)

The Phillies' starter, Wayne Twitchell—whom the Astros had selected third overall in the 1966 Major League Baseball draft—kept the Astros at bay by commencing with a two-hit shutout through seven frames, including retiring 11 in succession. Twitchell's counterpart, J. R. Richard, had surrendered two runs and four bases on balls, whiffing eight through seven innings.

In the eighth inning, José Cruz led off with a single, and Doug Rader ambushed the Phillies' defense with a bunt that allowed him to reach. With one out, Bob Watson pinch hit for Richard and singled up the middle to score Cruz, ending Twitchell's outing. Tug McGraw relieved Twitchell to face Greg Gross, for whom Johnson pinch hit. Johnson unloaded a double down the left field line that plated Rader, and an additional run scored on a misplayed relay throw to posit the Astros ahead to stay, 3–2. César Cedeño (intentional base on balls), Milt May and Enos Cabell (an RBI single each) all reached next. Hence, the Astros batted around to bring up Cruz with a 5–2 edge, who drew a walk to load the bases.

==== June—July ====
On June 15, Cliff Johnson hit the second pinch-hit grand slam in franchise history, following Milt May's on May 22, 1974. Johnson's blast was a game-winner during the top of the ninth inning to stun the St. Louis Cardinals, 8–7. In the bottom of the eighth inning, St. Louis had scored thrice to take a 7–4 lead. In the bottom of the eighth inning, Joe Niekro entered with the bases loaded, and surrendered two runs by issuing a walk and allowing a sacrifice fly. However, Niekro (2–1) secured the final five outs to earn the victory. It was Johnson's first career grand slam, and sixth home run as a pinch hitter.

On June 23, the Astros took a 6-run lead over the Los Angeles Dodgers. Wayne Granger pitched the final 2 2/3 innings; it was Granger's pickoff that ended the contest and secured a 6–5 win for the Astros.

From June 25 until August 18, Greg Gross reached base in 52 games consecutively to tie Jimmy Wynn for the franchise record. During the streak, Gross produced a .345 batting average, .427 on-base percentage (OBP) and .414 slugging percentage (SLG), garnering 70 hits and 30 bases on balls (BB). Wynn first set the record from June 4–August 3, 1969. Gross' and Wynn's streak trailed the NL record by 6 games, held by Duke Snider, who reached base at least once each game from May 13–July 11, 1954, for the Brooklyn Dodgers.

First baseman Bob Watson was invited to the MLB All-Star Game, his second career selection, and hosted at County Stadium in Milwaukee, Wisconsin. Watson pinch hit for NL starting pitcher Jerry Reuss in the fourth inning, and flied out to left field in his only plate appearance. The National League won, 6–3.

On July 21, the Astros induced four batted ground ball double plays by Joe Torre to establish an individual National League record (Note: Tied Goose Goslin of the Detroit Tigers in the American League on April 28, 1934, for the Major League record.) led by righty Ken Forsch on the mound for Houston at Shea Stadium, who tossed a complete game. Félix Millán, batting second and one slot ahead of Torre in the order, went 4-for-4, garnering a single each time, which resulted as the direct conversion into the lead out on each of Torre's dubious batting events. Forsch (4–7) went on to earn victory for Houston, as he dispersed 11 Mets hits, and withstood solo blasts from Rusty Staub and Dave Kingman. Roger Metzger tripled and had 2 RBI, while Wilbur Howard socked three hits and scored twice for Houston. The final score remained the Astros 6, and Mets 2.

Rookie relief pitcher José Sosa produced a memorable first game at the plate on July 30 at the Astrodome. Taking first his major league at bat in the eighth inning, Sosa homered off Danny Frisella of the San Diego Padres, a three-run blast to lead an 8–4 Astros win. Sosa become both the first Dominican pitcher and first Houston Astro to accomplish this feat. Prior to him, José Cruz and Doug Rader also homered in the sixth inning, and Sosa closed out the final 1 2/3 innings with a scoreless effort and two strikeouts to covert his first major league save. The next Astros player to hit a home run in his first at bat was Dave Matranga on June 27, 2003, who made a pinch hit appearance versus the Texas Rangers.

==== August ====
During the nightcap of a doubleheader on August 3, José Cruz collected his first career four-hit contest. He added a pair of doubles and a pair of runs batted in (RBI). Catcher Milt May homered, tripled and had five RBI. The Astros withstood a three-run San Francisco rally in the bottom of the eighth inning to hold on for a 10–9 triumph. Jim Crawford hurled 6 1/3 innings of relief for the win, while José Sosa earned his first hold.

On August 10, though he yielded 10 walks to the Pittsburgh Pirates, J. R. Richard navigated six innings with just one hit and two runs surrendered to lead a 5–3 Astros win. With two hits, a double, run scored, and a stolen base, César Cedeño led the way for Houston's offense.

Having performed to a major-league worst 47–80 (.370) showing, on August 19, Houston replaced incumbent skipper Preston Gómez with Bill Virdon. Less than three weeks earlier, on August 1, Virdon himself had been terminated by the New York Yankees, as New York sought out the potential of installing Billy Martin. During each of Virdon's first five contests as manager, Cliff Johnson launched a home run to lead to victories in three. Moreover, an exhibition game on August 21 opposing their Triple-A affiliate, the Iowa Oaks, featured another Johnson home run.

José Cruz recorded his first career 5 RBI bout on August 23, also hitting a home run. Meanwhile, Wilbur Howard registered his first career four-hit contest.

On August 24, Cliff Johnson blasted a home run (15) for the fifth successive contest, Howard garnered four safeties for the second consecutive game, while Cruz netted his first career multi-home run game to cap an 8–4 drubbing of the Chicago Cubs. Cruz went 3-for-5 with two home runs (7), one double, and five RBI. Bob Watson (16) also went deep. Larry Dierker (13–13) sailed to a complete game victory. Further, Howard heisted two bases (22). Howard became the third player in team history to record four hits each over consecutive games, succeeding John Bateman on September 5 and 6, 1966. (Note: Next accomplished for Houston by César Cedeño on September 12 and 13, 1977. Criteria: Longest streak of consecutive games, playing for HOU, in the regular season, requiring Hits ≥ 4, sorted by most games matching criteria.)

The Astros commenced a series on August 25 at Busch Memorial Stadium against the second-place St. Louis Cardinals 69–59 (.539). Roger Metzger scored the tying run in the ninth inning, sending the game to extra innings. The teams exchanged runs in the tenth inning to repeat the tie, 3–3. With rain falling in the top of the 11th, Bob Gibson was inserted for St. Louis. Johnson pounced for a shot to left, going deep for the sixth consecutive game, and a 4–3 Astros lead. However, with two out in the bottom of the inning, the downpour grew too heavy to continue. The game was called, and due to the rules of the day, all activity of that inning was erased—including Johnson's home run that would have been second in NL history to Dale Long's eight consecutive games. Thus, the final outcome of the contest remained 3–3 in 10 innings, accounting for Houston's lone tie score of the campaign.

Under Virdon, the Astros closed out the season with 17–17–1 (.500) performance.

==== September ====
On September 8, César Cedeño hit his 100th career home run in his sixth career multi-homer game, while establishing a career-high 6 RBI. Cedeño realized the milestone home run off Phil Niekro in the third inning in Atlanta. In the eighth, Cedeño's second big fly from Bruce Dal Canton's offering plated the go-ahead run to stay to in the lead for a 9–6 triumph. However, just 737 fans witnessed Cedeño's marvel of a performance.

==== Performance overview ====
The Astros concluded the 1975 season in last place the NL West with a record of 64–97–1, 43 1/2 games behind the division- and World Series-champion Cincinnati Reds, and turned in the worst record in the National League. The second time in franchise that the Astros had finished in last place, the 97 losses tied the 1965 team for most in team history, was equaled in 1991, and stood as the club record until 2011, when they lost 100 games for the first time. The Astros' .398 winning percentage established in 1975 a franchise-worst, and remained so until 2011. Having trailed the Reds by 43 1/2 games, this mark exceeded the 36 1/2 games behind the San Francisco Giants, the inaugural season of 1962. In 2013, they finished 45 games back.

Future Astros management turned in excellent seasons. Former general manager Bob Watson hit for a team-leading .324 average, 157 hits and 85 RBI, while former manager Larry Dierker was the pitching staff leader with 14 wins.

With 50 stolen bases, César Cedeño produced his fourth of a total of six campaigns in succession having attained that threshold, through 1977. Cedeño had been the only Astro through that point to have attained any 50-stolen base seasons. (Note: For single seasons, playing for HOU, in the regular season, requiring stolen bases ≥ 50, sorted by descending stolen bases.) Also, this was also the seventh of a franchise-record nine successive campaigns featuring at least one baserunner with 40 or more stolen bases. (Note: Number of players that meet criteria in a season, playing for HOU, in the regular season, requiring stolen bases ≥ 40, sorted by ascending instances.)

Also for the fourth consecutive campaign, Cedeño became a Gold Glove Award recipient at outfield. He and teammate Doug Rader, who had won for third base over five consecutive years from 1970 to 1974, were thus far Houston's only multiple winners. Also indicated was that this was the first campaign since 1971 the duo had failed to win the award together.

=== League standings ===
NL West
Team	W	L	Pct.	GB	Home	Road
Cincinnati Reds	108	54	.667	—	64‍–‍17	44‍–‍37
Los Angeles Dodgers	88	74	.543	20	49‍–‍32	39‍–‍42
San Francisco Giants	80	81	.497	27½	46‍–‍35	34‍–‍46
San Diego Padres	71	91	.438	37	38‍–‍43	33‍–‍48
Atlanta Braves	67	94	.416	40½	37‍–‍43	30‍–‍51
Houston Astros	64	97	.398	43½	37‍–‍44	27‍–‍53

=== Record versus opponents ===
National League

1975 National League record Sources:
Team	ATL	CHC	CIN	HOU	LAD	MON	NYM	PHI	PIT	SD	SF	STL
Atlanta	—	5–7	3–15	12–6	8–10	8–4	4–8	5–7	4–8	7–11	8–9	3–9
Chicago	7–5	—	1–11	7–5	5–7	9–9	7–11	12–6	6–12	5–7	5–7	11–7
Cincinnati	15–3	11–1	—	13–5	8–10	8–4	8–4	7–5	6–6	11–7	13–5	8–4
Houston	6–12	5–7	5–13	—	6–12	8–4	4–8	6–6	6–5	9–9	5–13	4–8–1
Los Angeles	10–8	7–5	10–8	12–6	—	5–7	6–6	7–5	5–7	11–7	10–8	5–7
Montreal	4–8	9–9	4–8	4–8	7–5	—	10–8	7–11	7–11	7–5	5–7	11–7
New York	8–4	11–7	4–8	8–4	6–6	8–10	—	7–11	5–13	8–4	8–4	9–9
Philadelphia	7-5	6–12	5–7	6–6	5–7	11–7	11–7	—	11–7	7–5	7–5	10–8
Pittsburgh	8–4	12–6	6–6	5–6	7–5	11–7	13–5	7–11	—	8–4	5–7	10–8
San Diego	11–7	7–5	7–11	9–9	7–11	5–7	4–8	5–7	4–8	—	8–10	4–8
San Francisco	9–8	7–5	5–13	13–5	8–10	7–5	4–8	5–7	7–5	10–8	—	5–7
St. Louis	9–3	7–11	4–8	8–4–1	7–5	7–11	9–9	8–10	8–10	8–4	7–5	—

=== Notable transactions ===
- June 3, 1975: Kim Seaman was drafted by the Astros in the 23rd round of the 1975 Major League Baseball draft, but did not sign.

=== Roster ===
1975 Houston Astros
Roster
Pitchers: 37 Mike Cosgrove; 30 Jim Crawford; 49 Larry Dierker; 43 Ken Forsch; 35 Wayne Granger; 38 Tom Griffin; 46 Doug Konieczny; 36 Joe Niekro; 50 J. R. Richard; 15 Dave Roberts; 44 Fred Scherman; 31 Paul Siebert; 44,60 José Sosa; 48 Mike Stanton; 42 Jim York	Catchers: 9 Skip Jutze; 8 Milt May; Infielders: 11 Rob Andrews; 17 Ken Boswell; 16 Jerry DaVanon; 19 Tommy Helms; 6 Cliff Johnson; 14 Roger Metzger; 10 Larry Milbourne; 12 Doug Rader; 27 Bob Watson	Outfielders: 23 Enos Cabell; 28 César Cedeño; 25 José Cruz; 24 Art Gardner; 21 Greg Gross; 26 Wilbur Howard; Other batters: 20 Rafael Batista; 20 Jesús de la Rosa; 22 Mike Easler	Manager: 18 Preston Gómez; 7 Bill Virdon; Coaches: 2 Roger Craig; 3 Hub Kittle; 5 Bob Lillis; 4 Jimmy Williams

== Player stats ==
=== Batting ===
==== Starters by position ====
Note: Pos = Position; G = Games played; AB = At bats; H = Hits; Avg. = Batting average; HR = Home runs; RBI = Runs batted in

Pos	Player	G	AB	H	Avg.	HR	RBI
C	Milt May	111	386	93	.241	4	52
1B	Bob Watson	132	485	157	.324	18	85
2B	Rob Andrews	103	277	66	.238	0	19
SS	Roger Metzger	127	450	102	.227	2	26
3B	Doug Rader	129	448	100	.223	12	48
LF	Greg Gross	132	483	142	.294	0	41
CF	César Cedeño	131	500	144	.288	13	63
RF	José Cruz	120	315	81	.257	9	49

==== Other batters ====
Note: G = Games played; AB = At bats; H = Hits; Avg. = Batting average; HR = Home runs; RBI = Runs batted in

Player	G	AB	H	Avg.	HR	RBI
Wilbur Howard	121	392	111	.283	0	21
Enos Cabell	117	348	92	.264	2	43
Cliff Johnson	122	340	94	.276	20	65
Ken Boswell	86	178	43	.242	0	21
Larry Milbourne	73	151	32	.212	1	9
Tommy Helms	64	135	28	.207	0	14
Jerry DaVanon	32	97	27	.278	1	10
Skip Jutze	51	93	21	.226	0	6
Art Gardner	13	31	6	.194	0	2
Rafael Batista	10	10	3	.300	0	0
Mike Easler	5	5	0	.000	0	0
Jesús de la Rosa	3	3	1	.333	0	0

=== Pitching ===
==== Starting pitchers ====
Note: G = Games pitched; IP = Innings pitched; W = Wins; L = Losses; ERA = Earned run average; SO = Strikeouts

Player	G	IP	W	L	ERA	SO
Larry Dierker	34	232.0	14	16	4.00	127
J.R. Richard	33	203.0	12	10	4.39	176
Dave Roberts	32	198.1	8	14	4.27	101
Doug Konieczny	32	171.0	6	13	4.47	89
Tom Griffin	17	79.1	3	8	5.33	56

==== Other pitchers ====
Note: G = Games pitched; IP = Innings pitched; W = Wins; L = Losses; ERA = Earned run average; SO = Strikeouts

Player	G	IP	W	L	ERA	SO
Ken Forsch	34	109.0	4	8	3.22	54
Jim York	19	46.2	4	4	3.86	17
Paul Siebert	7	18.1	0	2	2.95	6
Mike Stanton	7	17.1	0	2	7.27	16

==== Relief pitchers ====
Note: G = Games pitched; W = Wins; L = Losses; SV = Saves; ERA = Earned run average; SO = Strikeouts

Player	G	W	L	SV	ERA	SO
Wayne Granger	55	2	5	5	3.65	30
Jim Crawford	44	3	5	4	3.63	37
Joe Niekro	40	6	4	4	3.07	54
Mike Cosgrove	32	1	2	5	3.03	32
José Sosa	25	1	3	1	4.02	31
Fred Scherman	16	0	1	0	4.96	13

== Awards and achievements ==
=== Grand slams ===
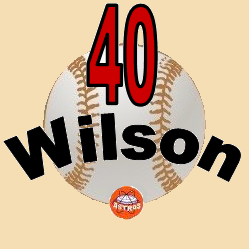
Don Wilson's number 5 was retired by the Houston Astros in April 13, 1975.

No.	Date	Astros batter	Venue	Inning	Pitcher	Opposing team	Box
1	June 15	Cliff Johnson (Note: 1st MLB grand slam) (Note: Pinch hitter)	Busch Memorial Stadium	9 (Note: Tied score or took lead)	Mike Garman	St. Louis Cardinals	

=== Career honors ===
Career honors received in 1975
Honor / mention received	Individual	Role	Uni.	Start	Finish	ASG	Bio. / Games	Summ.
Houston Astros uniform number retired	Don Wilson	Pitcher	40	1966	1974	1	268 games	
Ref.:

=== Annual awards ===
1975 Houston Astros award winners
Name of award		Recipient	Ref.
Gold Glove Award	Outfielder	César Cedeño	
Houston Astros Most Valuable Player (MVP)		Bob Watson	
MLB All-Star Game	Reserve first baseman	Bob Watson	
National League (NL) Player of the Month	May	Bob Watson	

Other awards results

Name of award	Voting recipient(s) (Team)	Ref.
NL Most Valuable Player	1st—J. Morgan (CIN) • 20th—Watson (HOU)	

== Minor league system ==
Level	Team	League	Manager
AAA	Iowa Oaks	American Association	Joe Sparks
AA	Columbus Astros	Southern League	Jim Beauchamp
A	Dubuque Packers	Midwest League	Bob Cluck
Rookie	Covington Astros	Appalachian League	Billy Smith

== See also ==
- List of Major League Baseball players with a home run in their first major league at bat
- List of Major League Baseball retired numbers
