= Epy Guerrero =

Dominican baseball scout

- Born: January 3, 1942; Santo Domingo, Dominican Republic
- Died: May 23, 2013 (aged 71); Santo Domingo, Dominican Republic
- Occupation: Baseball scout

Epifanio Obdulio "Epy" Guerrero (January 3, 1942 - May 23, 2013) was a Dominican baseball scout who signed more than 50 Major League Baseball (MLB) players for the Houston Astros, New York Yankees, Toronto Blue Jays and Milwaukee Brewers. Epy was the brother of former shortstop Mario Guerrero, and had two sons, Epy Jr. (Sandy) and Mike, who played and Coached minor league ball.

Guerrero was a Toronto Blue Jays coach in 1981. As a Blue Jays scout, Guerrero signed Tony Fernández and Carlos Delgado, and urged upper management to draft George Bell away from the Philadelphia Phillies.

He is considered to have signed more major leaguers than any other scout, including All Stars Cesar Cedeño, Carlos Delgado, Tony Fernández, Dámaso García, Alfredo Griffin, and José Mesa.

Guerrero was inducted into the Dominican Sports Hall of Fame in October 2008, and on January 15, 2009, Guerrero received a "Legends in Scouting Award" from the Professional Baseball Scouts Foundation.

== MLB players signed ==
During the 40 years Guerrero scouted for the Astros (1963–1973), Yankees (1974–1976), Blue Jays (1977–1995) and Brewers (1996–2003), 54 of the players he signed eventually reached the major leagues.

=== Houston Astros ===
- Cesar Cedeño
- Jesús de la Rosa
- Al Javier
- Luis Pujols
- Luis Sánchez
- José Sosa
- Alex Taveras

=== New York Yankees ===
- Juan Espino
- Jesús Figueroa
- Dámaso García
- Domingo Ramos
- Rafael Santana
- Jose Uribe

=== Toronto Blue Jays ===
- Carlos Almanzar
- Luis Aquino
- Gerónimo Berroa
- Tilson Brito
- Enrique Burgos
- Francisco Cabrera
- Sil Campusano
- Giovanni Carrara
- Tony Castillo
- Domingo Cedeño
- Pasqual Coco
- Francisco de la Rosa
- Carlos Delgado
- José Escobar
- Kelvim Escobar
- Junior Félix
- Tony Fernández
- Freddy García
- Beiker Graterol
- Toby Hernández
- José Herrera
- Edwin Hurtado
- Alexis Infante
- Luis Leal
- Nelson Liriano
- Fred Manrique
- Domingo Martínez
- Sandy Martinez
- José Mesa
- Julio Mosquera
- Pedro Muñoz
- Abraham Núñez
- Oswaldo Peraza
- Robert Pérez
- Luis Sojo
- William Suero
- Dilson Torres

=== Milwaukee Brewers ===
- Alcides Escobar
- Hernán Iribarren
- Luis Martínez
- Guilder Rodríguez
