= Rob Andrews (baseball) =

American baseball player (born 1952)

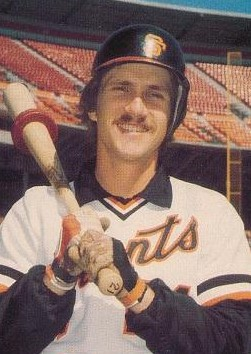
- Second baseman
- Born: December 11, 1952 (age 73); Santa Monica, California, U.S.
- Batted: Right Threw: Right

MLB debut
- April 7, 1975, for the Houston Astros

Last MLB appearance
- September 26, 1979, for the San Francisco Giants

MLB statistics
- Batting average: .251
- Home runs: 10
- Runs batted in: 91
- Stats at Baseball Reference

Teams
- Houston Astros (1975–1976); San Francisco Giants (1977–1979)

Robert Patrick Andrews (born December 11, 1952) is an American former professional baseball player. He played in Major League Baseball as a second baseman from 1975 until 1979 for the Houston Astros and San Francisco Giants. He is the younger brother of Mike Andrews.

After spending one year at El Camino Junior College, where he did not play any sports, Andrews was drafted by the Baltimore Orioles in the 1970 amateur draft, but would never play for the team. He was traded along with Enos Cabell from the Orioles to the Astros for Lee May and Jay Schlueter at the Winter Meetings on December 3, 1974. Even though he batted over .300 in each of the previous two seasons in the minors, Andrews was expendable because Bobby Grich was well established as the Orioles' starting second baseman. Andrews made his major league debut on April 7, 1975, recording two hits in a 6-2 Astros' win over the Atlanta Braves. That season, he had the distinction of recording at least one base hit in each of his first five major league games.

Andrews hit his first major league home run in the ninth inning of a nationally televised game on Monday night, July 17, 1978, off Buddy Schultz of the St. Louis Cardinals. The home run turned out to be the difference in a 9-7 Giants win. During the 1978 season, he added on 9 more homeruns.

After two seasons in Houston, he was dealt along with cash from the Astros to the Giants for Willie Crawford and Rob Sperring during spring training on March 26, 1977. He was released by the Giants after the 1979 season, making his final major league appearance in a pinch hit at bat on September 26, 1979, against Lerrin LaGrow of the Los Angeles Dodgers.
