= Francisco de la Rosa =

Dominican baseball player (1966–2011)

- Pitcher
- Born: March 3, 1966; La Romana, Dominican Republic
- Died: January 6, 2011 (aged 44); Baltimore, Maryland, U.S.
- Batted: Both Threw: Right

MLB debut
- September 7, 1991, for the Baltimore Orioles

Last MLB appearance
- October 3, 1991, for the Baltimore Orioles

MLB statistics
- Win–loss record: 0–0
- Earned run average: 4.50
- Strikeouts: 1

NPB statistics
- Win–loss record: 3–2
- Earned run average: 3.83
- Strikeouts: 27

Teams
- Baltimore Orioles (1991); China Times Eagles (1994)

Francisco de la Rosa Jiménez (March 3, 1966 – January 6, 2011) was a Dominican professional baseball pitcher. He made two appearances in Major League Baseball with the Baltimore Orioles during the 1991 season. Listed at 5' 11", 185 lbs., he threw right-handed.

== Career ==
Born in La Romana, Dominican Republic, he developed as a ballplayer around the San Pedro de Macoris area, a hotbed of future Major League talent at the time. He signed with Toronto Blue Jays scout Epy Guerrero in 1985, and spent one season with the GCL Blue Jays, in which he went 0–1 with a 5.52 earned run average in 16 relief appearances, before being released by Toronto.

De la Rosa joined the Baltimore Orioles organization in 1988, and went 3–4 with a 4.61 ERA for the Hagerstown Suns of the Carolina League. Though he had been used primarily as a reliever, he was converted to a starter with Hagerstown in 1990, now of the double A Eastern League. In that role, De la Rosa was 9–5 with a 2.06 ERA.

After compiling a 4–1 record with a 2.67 ERA for the triple A Rochester Red Wings in 1991, De la Rosa received a September call-up to the Orioles, making his Major League debut on September 7 against the Kansas City Royals. Inheriting a bases loaded, two out situation, he retired Bill Pecota on a fly ball to left to end the eighth inning. He then loaded the bases himself in the ninth before escaping the inning without giving up a run.

De la Rosa's next appearance came a month later against the New York Yankees. Entering the game with the Yankees having already scored five runs in the third inning, De la Rosa recorded the final two outs of the inning without giving up another run. He pitched a perfect fourth before the Yankees got to him for three runs in the fifth.

Prior to the start of the 1992 season, the Orioles sent De la Rosa to the Yankees to complete an earlier deal in which they acquired Alan Mills for a player to be named later. In two seasons with the Yankees' triple A affiliate, the Columbus Clippers, De la Rosa was 7–2 with a 4.93 ERA.

De la Rosa pitched for the St. Louis Cardinals' Triple-A affiliate, the Louisville Redbirds in 1995, and the Thunder Bay Whiskey Jacks of the independent Northern League in 1996. He also played for a long time with the Estrellas Orientales of the Dominican Winter Baseball League, earning the nickname "Tiger Tamer" for his performance against the Licey Tigers.

De la Rosa continued to pitch in independent leagues in New York City and Philadelphia before moving to Baltimore, Maryland, where he lived with his brothers until his death at 44.
