= J. R. Richard =

American baseball player (1950–2021)

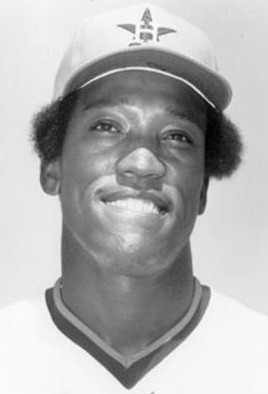
- Richard with the Houston Astros in 1976
- Pitcher
- Born: March 7, 1950; Vienna, Louisiana, U.S.
- Died: August 4, 2021 (aged 71); Houston, Texas, U.S.
- Batted: Right Threw: Right

MLB debut
- September 5, 1971, for the Houston Astros

Last MLB appearance
- July 14, 1980, for the Houston Astros

MLB statistics
- Win–loss record: 107–71
- Earned run average: 3.15
- Strikeouts: 1,493
- Stats at Baseball Reference

Teams
- Houston Astros (1971–1980)

Career highlights and awards
- All-Star (1980); NL ERA leader (1979); 2× NL strikeout leader (1978, 1979); Houston Astros Hall of Fame

James Rodney Richard (March 7, 1950 – August 4, 2021) was an American professional baseball player. He played his entire career in Major League Baseball as a right-handed starting pitcher for the Houston Astros from 1971 to 1980. Richard led the National League (NL) twice in strikeouts and was named an NL All-Star player in 1980.

After graduating from high school, Richard was selected by the Astros as the second overall pick in the first round of the 1969 amateur draft. From the time he made his major league debut with the Astros in 1971 until 1975, Richard had a limited role as an Astros pitcher, throwing no more than 72 innings in a season. In 1975, Richard played his first full season in the majors as a starting pitcher.

From 1976 to 1980, he was one of the premier pitchers in the majors, leading the National League twice in strikeouts, once in earned run average, and three times in hits allowed per nine innings, winning at least 18 games a year between 1976 and 1979.

On July 30, 1980, Richard suffered a stroke and collapsed while warming up before an Astros game. The cause was found to be a blood clot in his neck. He would never appear in another major league game. His 313 strikeouts in 1979 remained an Astros franchise record until Gerrit Cole surpassed it on September 24, 2019, and he held the team's record for career strikeouts (1,493) until 1987. Two-time National League MVPs Johnny Bench and Dale Murphy both named Richard as the toughest pitcher they ever faced.

In 1981, Richard attempted a comeback with the Astros, however this failed because the stroke had slowed down his reaction time and weakened his depth perception. He spent the next few seasons in the minor leagues before being released by the Astros in 1984, ending his career. Afterward, Richard became involved in unsuccessful business deals and went through two divorces, which led to him being homeless and destitute in 1994. Richard found solace in a local church and later became a Christian minister. In 2019, he was inducted into the Houston Astros Hall of Fame.

== Early life ==
Richard was born to Clayton and Lizzie (née Frost) Richard in Vienna, Louisiana, and gained prominence in both baseball and basketball at historically black and since closed Lincoln High School in nearby Ruston. By the time he was a high school senior, Richard stood 6 feet 8 inches (2.03 m) tall and weighed 220 pounds (99.8 kg; 15.7 st). That year, he was one of the starting pitchers for Lincoln High School and did not concede a run for the entire season. In one game Richard hit four consecutive home runs while pitching his team to a 48–0 victory against its local rival, Jonesboro's Jackson High School. Richard, whose baseball idol was St. Louis Cardinals pitcher Bob Gibson, never lost a game he started during his high school career.

Upon graduation from high school, he turned down more than 200 basketball scholarship offers to sign with the Houston Astros. The Astros selected him with the second overall pick in the 1969 amateur baseball draft, behind the Washington Senators' selection of outfielder Jeff Burroughs. Richard later recalled, "There were other guys in my high school with as much ability as I had, but instead of working at a job, they wanted to drink wine on Saturday nights. They thought that was the in-thing to do, and consequently our lives went in different directions. For some people it takes that to make a world. It does not for me."

== Early minor league career ==
After the Astros drafted Richard, they sent him to play for the Covington Astros, a rookie-level minor league baseball team in the Appalachian League. Richard started 12 games for Covington, finishing with five wins and four losses. Despite accumulating an average of 11.41 strikeouts per nine innings, Richard had trouble throughout the season with his pitching mechanics and control. In 56 innings, Richard struck out 71 batters but walked 52 and gave up 41 earned runs, resulting in a 6.59 earned run average (ERA).

The following year, at 20 years of age, Richard was promoted to the Cocoa Astros of the Florida State League in high-A minor league baseball. Richard again compiled a low hits per nine innings (H/9IP) ratio by giving up only 67 hits in 109 total innings pitched. Despite his 4–11 win–loss record, Richard finished the season with a 2.39 ERA and even threw a no-hitter against the Daytona Beach Dodgers. During the season, Richard was able to throw an accurate fastball which occasionally exceeded 100 miles per hour, and his slider 93 miles per hour, faster than those of most major-league pitchers. During the 1970–71 off-season, the Astros again promoted Richard: this time to Class-AAA baseball, one step below the major leagues, with the Oklahoma City 89ers of the now-defunct American Association. Richard wore number 50 and kept that number for the rest of his minor-league and major-league career. Richard started all but one of the games he pitched that season. He pitched eight complete games and led the league with 202 strikeouts in 173 innings of work. He ended the season with twelve wins and seven losses before being called up by the Houston Astros.

== Early major league career ==
=== 1971 season ===
Richard entered Major League Baseball with the Astros in 1971 as a September call-up. On September 5, Richard made his major league debut at just 21 years of age, in the second game of a doubleheader against the San Francisco Giants. Richard used his fastball–slider combination to pick up the win and tied Karl Spooner's 17-year-old major league record for striking out 15 batters in his first major league start. Richard was charged with two earned runs and seven hits in the 5–3 Astros win, and struck out Willie Mays and Dick Dietz three times.

Richard made his next start, after five days rest, against the Cincinnati Reds, who would later finish the NL West season in a tie for fourth place with the Astros. Richard gave up a lead-off home run to Pete Rose in the first inning and pitched five innings of the two-hit, one-run game. He struck out five batters but walked six. Richard struggled in his two following starts. In a September 16 match-up against the Astros' division rival, the third-place Atlanta Braves, Richard pitched seven innings and surrendered four runs on seven hits. He struck out nine batters and even struck out the side in the first inning but also walked four batters. Furthermore, he threw two wild pitches in the first and fifth innings. In his final game of the season, against the Giants, Richard was replaced in the first inning after pitching to only four batters.

=== In and out of the minors ===
During the next few seasons, Richard split time between the minors and majors and did not become a regular starter with the Astros until 1975. After his "cup of coffee" with the Astros in 1971, Richard was sent back down to Class-AAA baseball to work on his pitching with the Oklahoma City 89ers for the 1972 season. He started 19 games with the 89ers before being called back up to the Astros. In Triple-A baseball in the American Association, Richard finished with 10 wins and eight losses in 128 innings of work. His 3.02 ERA was slightly higher than that of the previous season, though he maintained approximately the same walks per nine innings ratio (BB/9IP) that he had the previous year. He recorded six complete games and finished with 169 strikeouts, for a ratio of 11.88 strikeouts per 9 innings. Richard re-entered the majors, starting a day game of a day-night doubleheader for the Astros against the San Diego Padres on July 30, 1972. He struggled and took the 10–7 loss. Richard did not pitch again until two weeks later, when he entered in relief for Ken Forsch in the fifth inning to keep the Giants limited to a one-run lead. In two innings of relief, Richard gave up one hit, struck out three batters and garnered the win. In his two final relief appearances of the season, Richard gave up five earned runs in just over one inning of work. He finished the season with a 13.50 ERA in only six innings of work and was again sent back down to Triple-A, this time with the Astros-affiliated Denver Bears.

Richard started eight games with the Bears in 1973 and posted minor league career-worsts in ERA and hits allowed per nine innings. Despite his poor performance with the Bears, Richard was again called up by the Astros. Richard entered in the fourth inning of a June 16 game against the St. Louis Cardinals and his idol Bob Gibson. He pitched four innings of one-run ball and three innings of a two-hit game in his next relief outing. Afterwards, the Astros placed Richard in the starting rotation, and he made his first major league start since July 30 of the previous year. He pitched six solid innings of a one-run ballgame and struck out six while walking three batters. Richard would make his next start four days later. Richard again pitched more than six innings but earned no decision after the Astros' bullpen gave up nine runs during the top of the ninth inning.

After starting a July 4 game against the Atlanta Braves, which he won, Richard was sent into the bullpen in order to add Tom Griffin into the Astros' starting rotation. He made three relief appearances against the Montreal Expos before making a start against the Los Angeles Dodgers on July 27. Four days later, Richard threw his first shutout against the Dodgers, in which he gave up just five hits and struck out nine batters. Nineteen days later, Richard pitched another complete game, this time giving up two runs while striking out nine and walking three batters. He concluded the season with six wins and two losses in 16 total games, 10 of which he started. He finished with a 4.00 ERA, and struck out 75 batters in 72 innings. He walked 38 batters, giving him a ratio of 4.75 walks per nine innings, which was lower than the ratio he had in his two previous minor league seasons.

Despite his improved performance in the 1973 season, Richard was sent down to work on his pitching mechanics and ball control in Class-AA baseball with the Columbus Astros of the Southern League. He started 13 games with Columbus before being moved back up to Class-AAA with the Denver Bears. In four starts with the Bears, Richard threw three shutouts and pitched 33 scoreless innings with a 4–0 record and 26 strikeouts. He was called back up to the majors on July 13 and stayed with the Astros for the remainder of that season. He first pitched 14 innings of baseball in six relief appearances before being placed back in the starting rotation. He then started in all nine of the games he pitched during the remainder of the season. Richard finished with a 4.18 ERA in just over 64 innings of work during the 15 pitching appearances he made during the season.

Even though Richard's statistics showed he bounced between Houston and the minors during his first four years with the Astros due to his wildness, he often told reporters that racism played a role in keeping him from becoming a regular with the big club sooner.

== Mainstay with the Astros ==
In the off-season, the Astros traded starting pitcher Claude Osteen to the Cardinals, and lost pitching ace Don Wilson, who died from carbon monoxide poisoning at the age of 29 on January 5, 1975. As a result, Richard entered the 1975 season as the third starter of the Astros' pitching rotation, behind veterans Larry Dierker and Dave Roberts. Richard was scheduled to start on April 9 versus the Braves. He was removed from the game in the fifth inning after jamming his toe on the first base bag but gave up no earned runs in his start. Richard continued to exhibit wildness, as shown when he issued eight walks in both his third and fourth starts of the season. He followed by pitching a complete game win against the San Diego Padres on April 29. In his following start, he walked a career-high 11 batters in just six innings of pitching and also gave up seven runs in the Astros' 12–8 win over the Giants. By the All-Star break, Richard had six wins and four losses with a 4.93 ERA in just over 98 innings of work.

In an August 10 game against the Pittsburgh Pirates, Richard yielded just one hit in six innings, although he walked 10 batters. He rebounded with a complete game shutout against the New York Mets eight days later. Richard ended the season on a strong note by winning three of his last four starts, including his final two games against the Dodgers. He finished the year with a 12–10 record for the Astros, who finished with a franchise-worst 64–97 record. Richard was the only starter on the Astros' pitching staff who had a winning record for the season. He led the team with 176 strikeouts, which was also the fifth highest number in the National League. Richard also led the league in walks allowed and wild pitches thrown, with 138 and 20, respectively.

=== Breakout season ===
Richard entered the 1976 season as the pitching staff ace and took over Larry Dierker's position as the Opening Day starter for the Astros. In that start on April 8, Richard gave up four runs in four innings against the defending World Series champion Cincinnati Reds. He followed this inauspicious beginning with wins in five of his next six decisions. One of them included a 10-inning shutout effort that led to a 16-inning 1–0 Astros victory against the Dodgers. By the end of May, however, Richard was sitting even with a 5–5 record and as the loser of four straight decisions. He closed the first half of the season by winning a 10-inning shutout against the Mets on July 6, and an eight-inning start against the Montreal Expos four days later. At the All-Star break, Richard had a 9–9 record with a 2.88 ERA in over 153 innings of work. From July 10 to August 31, Richard racked up eight complete games, including one shutout, and improved his record from 9–9 to 16–13. He pitched 98 innings and yielded only 22 earned runs, which gave him an ERA of 2.02 during the approximately 50-day span. On August 26, Richard hit his first home run of the season during the second inning of the game. In his last game of the season on October 2, Richard pitched a complete game 13-strikeout performance and also hit a two-run home run in the sixth inning.

Richard finished the season with a 20–15 record, 14 complete games, three shutouts, and 214 strikeouts in 291 innings of work. At age 26, Richard became only the second pitcher in Astros' history (after Dierker in 1969) to record 20 wins in a season, tying him for fourth in the NL that year. Richard also became the ninth member of the Black Aces, an organization founded by Mudcat Grant that consists of all African American pitchers who have won at least 20 major league games in a season. He was named the most valuable player (MVP) of the Astros by the Houston chapter of the Baseball Writers' Association of America (BBWAA). Richard finished 17th in MVP Award voting and seventh in the NL's Cy Young Award voting. His 2.75 ERA was the seventh-best among the league's starting pitchers, and he held hitters to a 0.212 batting average. He led the league in lowest number of hits allowed per nine innings and in walks allowed; Richard also finished the season second in batters faced, innings pitched, and games started. In addition, he led all NL pitchers with 14 hits, two home runs, and nine runs batted in as a hitter. However, during the year he committed ten errors and finished with an 0.853 fielding percentage, nearly 0.100 lower than the league average.

== Middle years ==
=== 1977 season ===
Richard began the 1977 season with a stellar performance, a nine-inning, seven-strikeout effort on April 8 against the Atlanta Braves. He pitched seven complete game victories in the first half of the season. By the All-Star break, Richard had nine wins and six losses in over 160 innings of work, accompanied by 119 strikeouts and a 2.69 ERA. Although Richard struggled through July and early August, he did manage to pitch three complete games (including two shutouts) in five starts from August 27 to September 17. He had 11 and 10 strikeouts respectively in the final two starts of that roughly 20-day span.

Richard closed out the season with two complete games, the first against the Braves on September 27, and the second against the Dodgers on October 2. He had a season-high 14 strikeouts in his final start, which tied Steve Carlton's season-high mark. Richard concluded the season on a high note by winning nine of his last twelve decisions. At the end of the season, he led the Astros' pitching staff in wins, starts, complete games, innings pitched, walks, and strikeouts. He had 18 wins and 12 losses in 267 innings pitched and posted a 2.97 ERA and 214 strikeouts. For the first time since becoming a permanent member of the Astros' starting rotation, Richard was not the league leader in walks allowed, but as he had done in 1976, he led the league in wild pitches. He finished fourth in the league with 13 complete games, and he improved his fielding from the previous season by going through an error-free season.

Richard hit well for a pitcher, going 20-for-87 in the season with two triples, two home runs, and seven runs batted in. After the season was completed, Richard underwent an emergency appendectomy on October 26, 1977, at a Houston hospital. He spent most of the off-season working out at the Houston Astrodome and, for relaxation, fishing. In early 1978, he was a participant in ABC's Superstars all-around sports competition.

=== Record-setting year ===
Richard entered the 1978 season as the Astros' Opening Day starter. In the first game of the season, he gave up seven runs on 11 hits and just made it into the fifth inning before being replaced in a loss to the Cincinnati Reds. He recovered from the loss by pitching a complete game two-hit shutout in his next outing against the Dodgers. In an eight-start period from April 26 to June 4, Richard threw six complete games, including two back-to-back shutouts, and lowered his ERA from 4.15 to 3.05. He struck out 67 and gave up only 39 hits in the 63 total innings he pitched. On a June 9 start against the Cardinals, Richard struck out 12 batters but also walked six and gave up five earned runs. By the end of the first half of the season Richard had pitched back-to-back games with nine and 12 strikeout performances, against the Cincinnati Reds and Los Angeles Dodgers, respectively. At the All-Star break, he had an 8–9 record with a 3.49 ERA but also had 157 strikeouts in 139 innings of work.

After the break, Richard threw an 11-inning, 10-strikeout game against the Expos and followed with two complete games and another nine-inning performance in a game that went into extra innings. He was selected as the National League Pitcher of the Month after going a perfect 4–0 with a 1.29 ERA and 58 strikeouts in 56 innings during July. Throughout much of August, his season ERA hovered below 3.00, and he averaged well over a strikeout per inning. On August 21, in an 8–3 victory over the Chicago Cubs, he broke Don Wilson's 1969 club record of 235 strikeouts. In the final two months of the season, Richard's strikeout average dramatically increased, and he struck out a double-digit number of batters in three of his last five starts. In his third-to-last start, Richard broke Tom Seaver's NL record of 290 strikeouts by a right-hander when he struck out Bob Horner. In his final outing of the season, Richard reached the 300-strikeout pinnacle by striking out Rowland Office in a September 28 victory over the Braves. He also hit his seventh career home run, making him the Astros' career leader in home runs by a pitcher. At that time, he became only the tenth pitcher, third National Leaguer, and first NL right-hander in history to strike out more than 300 batters in a single season.

Richard finished the season with 18 wins, 11 losses and a 3.11 ERA. He led the team's pitching staff in innings pitched, starts, complete games, shutouts, hits allowed, earned runs, walks allowed, and strikeouts. He held batters to a .156 batting average at home and a .196 average overall, which was the lowest in the NL. Richard again fared well in the field, finishing with three errors and a 0.957 fielding percentage, slightly higher than the 0.950 league average. He finished fourth in the Cy Young Award voting, behind Gaylord Perry, Burt Hooton, and Vida Blue. He finished atop the league in strikeouts per nine innings (9.90), fewest hits allowed per nine innings (6.28), walks (141), and wild pitches (16).

=== 1979 season ===
In his second game of the 1979 season, Richard set the modern-day record for throwing six wild pitches in a single game against the Dodgers. Despite this, he finished the game with a 13-strikeout performance in a 2–1 Astros victory. He won his first four decisions that season but those victories were followed by four losses. He continued to accumulate strikeouts and finally began to walk fewer batters on average, exhibiting greater control over his pitching. Richard evened out his record at seven wins and seven losses by pitching a complete game three-hit shutout against the Padres on June 30. By the All-Star break, Richard had 7 wins, 10 losses, a 3.52 earned run average and 158 strikeouts in just a bit over 157 innings of work. By July 25, his record stood at eight wins and 11 losses, but after he pitched nine straight complete games (including two-hit and three-hit shutouts on August 27 and September 6, respectively) through September 6 and worked 86 consecutive innings without the need of a relief pitcher, which set an Astros club record, it was clear that he was on a winning streak. On September 21, in a game against the Reds, he pitched 11 innings and matched a career high of 15 strikeouts, which he also reached earlier in the season on August 3 in a game against the Braves. He closed out the season against the Dodgers by winning his 11th straight game against the team, with his last loss having come on June 23, 1976. He was honored as the National League Pitcher of the Month for September after going 4–1 with a 1.24 ERA, four complete games, two shutouts, and 69 strikeouts in 53 innings pitched during the stretch.

He finished the season with 18–13 record and a league-best 2.71 ERA. He struck out 10 or more batters 14 times in the season, and totaled a league-leading 313 strikeouts for the season, breaking his own club record. Richard joined Nolan Ryan and Sandy Koufax as the only modern-day pitchers to strike out over 300 batters in consecutive seasons. He led the club in ERA, complete games, and innings pitched and tied Joe Niekro in number of games started. He gave up 220 hits in the season, which gave him a league-best 6.77 hits per nine innings ratio. He again led the league by limiting opposing hitters' batting averages to .209 that year. Richard finished fifth in the league in walks allowed, with his first sub-100 total since he became a mainstay starter with the Astros. He also led the league with a 9.64 strikeouts per nine innings ratio. Richard finished 19th in National League MVP Award voting and third in Cy Young Award voting, behind winner Bruce Sutter and teammate Joe Niekro, who had 21 wins and a 3.00 ERA that season. Richard fared slightly worse in batting and fielding, finishing with a .126 batting average and a .902 fielding percentage and five errors. On October 11, Richard signed a four-year contract with the Astros.

== 1980 season and stroke ==
By now Richard was among the best pitchers in baseball. When asked in 2012 who was the "toughest pitcher to get a hit off" during his career, Dale Murphy answered "Anybody that played in the late '70s or early '80s will probably give you the same answer: JR Richard". In 1980, Richard was now teamed with seven-time American League strikeout champion Nolan Ryan, who had joined the Astros as a free agent. During the first half of the season, Richard was virtually unhittable, starting the year with five straight wins, 48 strikeouts (including two starts with 12 and 13 strikeouts), and a sub-2.00 ERA. He was named National League Pitcher of the Month for April. At one point, Richard threw three straight complete-game shutouts, two against the Giants and one against the Cubs. On July 3, he broke Dierker's team record of 1487 career strikeouts in a 5–3 win over the Braves; it was to be Richard's last major league victory. After finishing the first half of the season with a 10–4 record, 115 strikeouts and a 1.96 ERA, Richard was selected to be the National League's starting pitcher in the MLB All-Star Game on July 8, but he pitched just two innings due to various back and shoulder problems. As the season progressed, Richard began to complain of a "dead arm", citing discomfort in his shoulder and forearm. His concerns fell on deaf ears. Some in the media even interpreted these complaints as whining or malingering, citing Richard's reputation for moodiness. Others hypothesized that Richard was egotistical and could not handle the pressure of pitching for the Astros, while others suggested he was jealous of Ryan's $4.5 million contract.

During his next start on July 14 against the Braves, Richard was pitching well and even struck out the side in the second inning, but had trouble seeing catcher Alan Ashby's signs and also had difficulty moving his arm. He left the game in the fourth inning after throwing a fastball and feeling his right arm go "dead". He had numbness in the fingers of his right hand and could not grasp a baseball. The Astros placed Richard on the 21-day disabled list. As it turned out, it would be his last major league game.

Nine days later, he checked into Methodist Hospital in Houston for a series of physical and psychological tests to determine the cause of his mysterious arm problems. An angiogram revealed an obstruction in the distal subclavian and axillary arteries of the right arm. Richard's blood pressure in his left arm was normal but pressure was nearly absent in his right arm due to the completely obstructed artery. On July 25, however, the arteries in his neck were studied, and the doctors reached a conclusion that all was normal and no surgical treatment needed to be performed.

On July 30, Richard went to see a chiropractor who rotated his neck to fix the flow of blood in his upper torso region. Later that day, Richard was participating in warm-ups before the game when he suffered a major stroke and collapsed in the outfield. Before the stroke, he had a headache and a feeling of weakness through his body. Eventually, that progressed into vision problems and paralysis in the left side of his body. A massive blockage in his right carotid artery necessitated emergency surgery that evening. An examination by neurologist William S. Fields showed that Richard was still experiencing weakness in his extremities and on the left side of his face, and he had blurred vision through his left eye. A CAT scan of Richard's brain later showed that Richard had experienced three separate strokes from the different obstructions in his arterial system. Furthermore, the arteries in his right arm were still obstructed. Later examinations showed that Richard was suffering from extensive arterial thoracic outlet syndrome. While pitching, his clavicle and first rib pinched his subclavian artery. As a result of this problem, Richard would feel normal for the first few innings of the game but after putting repeated pressure on his subclavian artery, his arm would start to ache in pain and eventually start to feel "heavy". His wife at the time, Carolyn, told reporters, "It took death, or nearly death, to get an apology. They should have believed him." Richard underwent rehabilitation and missed the rest of the season.

=== Comeback attempt ===
In 1981, Richard underwent a rehabilitation program with the aim of recovering from the effects of the stroke, which had left his left side partially paralyzed. He trained with the Astros and the Texas Southern University team, participating regularly in pitching and batting practice with both toward the end of the baseball season. After pitching in a few simulated games, Richard was placed on the 40-man active roster on September 1, 1981. Despite this, Astros manager Bill Virdon thought Richard was still not ready to return, so Richard did not pitch with the team during the last two months of the season.

The following year, Richard pitched in a single spring training game and then went into extended spring training in Sarasota, Florida, during the first two months of the season. There he registered three wins and two losses and a 3.38 ERA in seven starts with 32 total innings. Afterwards, he joined the major league rehabilitation program with the Daytona Beach Astros of the Florida State League. In his six starts, Richard notched three wins, two complete games and posted a 2.79 ERA. He was then promoted to Triple-A with the Tucson Toros of the Pacific Coast League. He struggled to control the ball, conceding a high number of runs to opposing teams. He took a loss on August 12 against the Phoenix Giants and on August 27 against the Salt Lake City Gulls in a 13–0 rout. His longest outing as a starter—more than five innings—was an appearance against the Giants in the last game of the season on September 1. He then joined the Astros' extended roster, but did not appear in any games.

In 1983, Richard started to complain of pain in his left calf. The synthetic graft inserted in his July 1980 surgery had closed off, which meant that he needed a surgical bypass in his left leg. Richard was granted free agency by the Astros on November 7, 1983, but the Astros still had faith in him, so he was re-signed on February 17 of the following year. Just a little over two months later, he was released by the Astros, thus ending his baseball career. Despite an almost complete recovery, he was never able to re-learn the coordination required to be able to pitch again. His final major league record was 107–71, with 1,493 strikeouts and a 3.15 ERA in 238 games and 1,606 innings. Nolan Ryan broke his Astros record for career strikeouts in 1987.

== Career statistics ==
Year	Ag	Tm	Lg	G	GS	W	L	ERA	CG	SHO	IP	Hits	R	ER	HR	BB	K	WHIP	K/9	H/9
1971	21	HOU	NL	4	4	2	1	3.43	1	0	21.0	17	9	8	1	16	29	1.571	12.43	7.29
1972	22	HOU	NL	4	1	1	0	13.50	0	0	6.0	10	9	9	0	8	8	3.000	12.00	15.00
1973	23	HOU	NL	16	10	6	2	4.00	2	1	72.0	54	37	32	2	38	75	1.278	9.38	6.75
1974	24	HOU	NL	15	9	2	3	4.18	0	0	64.7	58	31	30	3	36	42	1.454	5.85	8.07
1975	25	HOU	NL	33	31	12	10	4.39	7	1	203.0	178	107	99^{†}	8	138*	176	1.557	7.80†	7.89
1976**^{‡}	26	HOU	NL	39^{†}	39^{†}	20^{†}	15^{†}	2.75^{†}	14^{†}	3	291.0^{†}	221	105	89^{†}	14	151*	214	1.278	6.62v	6.84*
1977	27	HOU	NL	36^{†}	36^{†}	18^{†}	12	2.97^{†}	13^{†}	3^{†}	267.0	212	94	88	18	104^{†}	214	1.184^{†}	7.21†	7.15†
1978**	28	HOU	NL	36^{†}	36^{†}	18^{†}	11	3.11	16^{†}	3^{†}	275.3^{†}	192	104	95^{†}	12	141*	303*	1.209	9.90*	6.28*
1979**^{‡}	29	HOU	NL	38^{†}	38^{†}	18^{†}	13^{†}	2.71*	19^{†}	4^{†}	292.3^{†}	220	98	88	13	98^{†}	313*	1.088^{†}	9.64*	6.77*
1980^{∞}	30	HOU	NL	17	17	10	4	1.90	4	4	113.7	65	31	24	2	40	119	0.924	9.42	5.15
10		Seasons		238	221	107	71	3.15	76	19	1606.0	1227	625	562	73	770	1493	1.243	8.37	6.88

- * = Led NL
- † = Top 10 in National League
- ∞ = Selected to All-Star Team
- ** = Top 10 in Cy Young Award voting
- ‡ = Top 10 in MVP voting

== After baseball ==
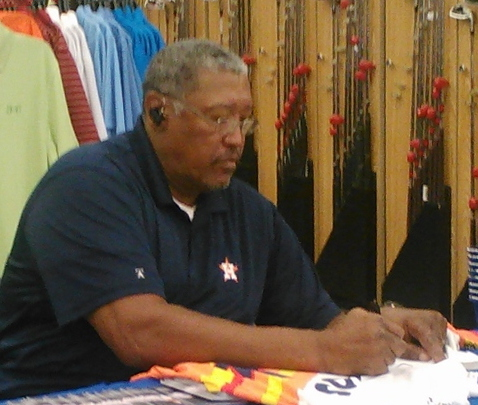
Richard in 2013

After his professional baseball career ended, Richard returned to Louisiana and invested in some business ventures. He fell prey to an oil business scam, losing over $300,000 in the deal. A few years later, Richard paid $669,000 in a divorce settlement to ex-wife Carolyn. He married and divorced again, losing his suburban Houston home and most of his money. In 1989, Richard was drafted into the Senior Professional Baseball Association and played for the Orlando Juice but was cut from the team in preseason play. By the winter of 1994, Richard was homeless and destitute and lived under a highway overpass in Houston.

By 1995, Richard was eligible for his pension from Major League Baseball. He played in the Old-Timers' Day game with the Astros in the same year. In the following months, after spending many nights under the overpass Highway 59 at Beechnut Road in Houston, he turned to the Now Testament Church and sought help from its minister, Reverend Floyd Lewis. Richard overcame his homelessness by working with this minister, with a belief that he "always knew God was on his side". Richard started working at an asphalt company and later returned to the church as a minister.

Richard became involved in the Houston community, working with local financial donors to help establish baseball programs for children. A small-budget 2005 movie, Resurrection: The J. R. Richard Story, depicted Richard's baseball career as well as his life after baseball. Along with former major leaguers Dick Allen, Mudcat Grant, Kenny Lofton, and Eddie Murray, Richard was honored by the Negro Leagues Baseball Museum as a 2018 member of the "Hall of Game." Richard was inducted into the Baseball Reliquary's Shrine of the Eternals in 2019.

=== Death ===
Richard died at a Houston hospital on August 4, 2021, at the age of 71. According to his family, he was experiencing complications from COVID-19.

== Publications ==
- Richard, J. R.; Freedman, Lew (2015). Still Throwing Heat: Strikeouts, the Streets, and a Second Chance. Triumph Books. ISBN 9781629370996.

== See also ==
- Black Aces
- Houston Astros award winners and league leaders
- List of Major League Baseball career FIP leaders
- List of Major League Baseball All-Star Game starting pitchers
- List of Major League Baseball annual ERA leaders
- List of Major League Baseball annual strikeout leaders
- List of Major League Baseball players who spent their entire career with one franchise

Awards and achievements
Preceded by Vida Blue; Rick Reuschel	National League Pitcher of the Month; July 1978; September 1979—April 1980	Succeeded by Kent Tekulve; Steve Carlton
