= Milt May =

American baseball player and coach (born 1950)

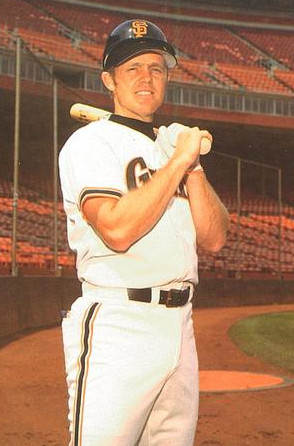
- May with the San Francisco Giants in 1983
- Catcher
- Born: August 1, 1950 (age 76); Gary, Indiana, U.S.
- Batted: Left Threw: Right

MLB debut
- September 8, 1970, for the Pittsburgh Pirates

Last MLB appearance
- September 30, 1984, for the Pittsburgh Pirates

MLB statistics
- Batting average: .263
- Home runs: 77
- Runs batted in: 443
- Stats at Baseball Reference

Teams
- Pittsburgh Pirates (1970–1973); Houston Astros (1974–1975); Detroit Tigers (1976–1979); Chicago White Sox (1979); San Francisco Giants (1980–1983); Pittsburgh Pirates (1983–1984); As Coach: Pittsburgh Pirates (1987–1996); Florida Marlins (1997–1998); Tampa Bay Devil Rays (1999); Colorado Rockies (1999)

Career highlights and awards
- 2× World Series champion (1971, 1997)

Milton Scott May (born August 1, 1950) is an American former professional baseball player and coach. He played as a catcher in Major League Baseball from 1970 to 1984 for the Pittsburgh Pirates, Houston Astros, Detroit Tigers, Chicago White Sox, and San Francisco Giants.

== Major league career ==
Milt May was selected as an infielder in the 11th round (237th overall) of the 1968 Major League Baseball draft by the Pittsburgh Pirates out of St. Petersburg High School, Florida who then converted him into a catcher. He was a handler of pitchers and a left-handed line drive hitter who rarely swung at a bad pitch, but also was reputedly the slowest runner in the majors for much of his career.

At age 21, May was a member of the Pirates team that won the 1971 World Series. In the seventh inning of Game Four of that series, his pinch-hit single drove in Bob Robertson with the winning run in a 4–3 Pirates victory. Tragedy struck the Pirates in late 1972, when outfielder Roberto Clemente died in a plane crash. May was slated to replace Clemente in the Pirates' lineup in 1973, with catcher Manny Sanguillén moving to right field. However the experiment ended by July when it was determined that Sanguillén could not adjust to playing in the outfield and May was back on the Pirates' bench.

May was traded from the Pirates to the Houston Astros for Jerry Reuss on October 31, 1973. He became the Astros starting catcher, replacing veteran Johnny Edwards. He led National League catchers with a .993 fielding percentage in 1974. May led all National League catchers in 1975 with 70 assists and 47 baserunners caught stealing. He was also charged with 18 passed balls in 1975 for the Astros, who had knuckleballer Joe Niekro on their staff. On May 4, 1975, May drove in Bob Watson for Major League Baseball's one millionth run.

May was dealt along with Dave Roberts and Jim Crawford from the Astros to the Detroit Tigers for Leon Roberts, Terry Humphrey, Gene Pentz and Mark Lemongello on December 6, 1975. He played only six games in 1976 before a broken ankle sidelined him for the season. He recovered in 1977 to record 12 double plays and 0 passed balls. In 1978, May platooned with an up-and-coming Lance Parrish. By 1979, Parrish had taken over as the regular Tigers catcher, and May was traded to the Chicago White Sox. After only one year in Chicago, he signed a five-year, $1 million free agent contract with the San Francisco Giants on December 12, 1979. On June 13, 1980, during a 3–1 win over the New York Mets‚ May hit the 9000th home run in the history of the Giants franchise. John Montgomery Ward hit home run #1 in 1883‚ and the 8‚000th was hit by Bobby Bonds on September 4‚ 1971. In 1981, he batted .310 -which was the highest mark ever for a Giants catcher.

In August 1983, the Giants traded him back to the Pirates for catcher Steve Nicosia. May retired as a player after the 1984 season.

== Career statistics ==
In a fifteen-year major league career, May played in 1,192 games, accumulating 971 hits in 3,693 at bats for a .263 career batting average along with 77 home runs and 443 runs batted in. He ended his career with a .986 fielding percentage.

== Coaching career ==
May became a coach for the Pirates in 1987, serving under manager Jim Leyland. He was major-league hitting coach for ten seasons in Pittsburgh (1987–96) and two with the Florida Marlins (1997–98). He spent the first half of the 1999 season with the Tampa Bay Devil Rays and was later named a pitching coach for the Colorado Rockies. May was a scout for the Rockies in 2000, then spent the 2001 season as a Pirates minor-league hitting coordinator."

In February 2019, May was named hitting coach for the Orioles of the Gulf Coast League.

== Personal life ==
He is the son of baseball third baseman Pinky May and the brother-in-law of pitcher Pat Osburn. As a youth, Milt would serve as a bat boy for his father's minor league teams. He is the brother of Merrill May. May was a shortstop at St. Petersburg High School. He lives in Bradenton, Florida, with his wife, Brenda. He has two children, Scott and Merrily, and six grandchildren.

== See also ==
- List of second-generation Major League Baseball players
