= Wilbur Howard =

American baseball player

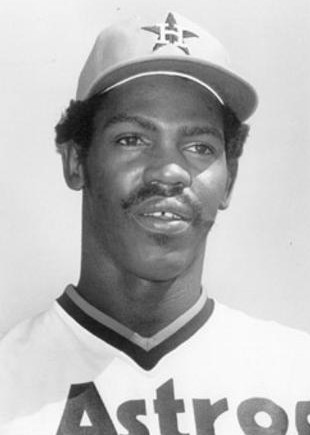
- Howard in 1976
- Outfielder
- Born: January 8, 1949; Lowell, North Carolina, U.S.
- Died: December 17, 2022 (aged 73); Humble, Texas, U.S.
- Batted: Both Threw: Right

MLB debut
- September 4, 1973, for the Milwaukee Brewers

Last MLB appearance
- September 30, 1978, for the Houston Astros

MLB statistics
- Batting average: .250
- Home runs: 6
- Runs batted in: 71
- Stats at Baseball Reference

Teams
- Milwaukee Brewers (1973); Houston Astros (1974–1978)

Wilbur Leon Howard (January 8, 1949 – December 17, 2022) was an American outfielder in Major League Baseball who played for the Milwaukee Brewers (1973) and the Houston Astros (1974–1978).

Howard was selected in the 19th round of the 1969 Major League Baseball draft by the Seattle Pilots, who would move to Milwaukee and become the Brewers after the season. Howard played in the Brewers organization for the next four seasons, getting a September call-up in 1973, when he batted .205 in 39 at bats. The following spring, he was traded to the Astros in exchange for the star-crossed Larry Yount and another minor leaguer.

Howard started the 1974 season in the minor leagues, but was called up in mid-June, spending the rest of the season as the Astros' fourth outfielder. In 1975, he remained in that role, although the Astros rotated their other outfielders (Greg Gross, César Cedeño, and José Cruz) out of the lineup often enough that Howard played in 121 games, batting .283 with 32 stolen bases, which was eighth in the league and second on the team to Cedeño's 50.

In 1976, however, manager Bill Virdon moved Howard back into a more traditional fourth outfielder role, and he continued to serve in that capacity for three seasons. After spending 1979 in the minor leagues with the Charleston Charlies, Howard called it quits.

== Sources ==
- Career statistics from Baseball Reference · Baseball Reference (Minors) · Retrosheet · Baseball Almanac
