= Gene Pentz =

American baseball player (born 1953)

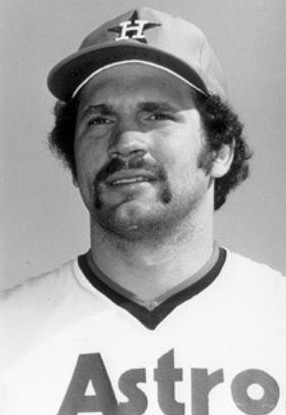
- Pentz in 1976
- Pitcher
- Born: June 21, 1953 (age 73); Johnstown, Pennsylvania, U.S.
- Batted: Right Threw: Right

MLB debut
- July 29, 1975, for the Detroit Tigers

Last MLB appearance
- May 3, 1978, for the Houston Astros

MLB statistics
- Win–loss record: 8–9
- Earned run average: 3.63
- Strikeouts: 116
- Stats at Baseball Reference

Teams
- Detroit Tigers (1975); Houston Astros (1976–1978)

Eugene David Pentz (born June 21, 1953) is an American former Major League Baseball pitcher. He played all or part of four seasons in the majors, from 1975 until 1978 for the Detroit Tigers and Houston Astros. He was traded along with Leon Roberts, Terry Humphrey and Mark Lemongello from the Tigers to the Astros for Milt May, Dave Roberts and Jim Crawford on December 6, 1975.
