= José Sosa (baseball) =

Dominican baseball player (1952-2013)

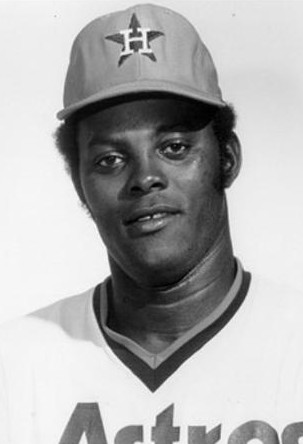
- Sosa in 1976
- Relief pitcher
- Born: December 28, 1952; Santo Domingo, Dominican Republic
- Died: June 8, 2013 (aged 60); Santo Domingo, Dominican Republic
- Batted: Right Threw: Right

MLB debut
- July 22, 1975, for the Houston Astros

Last MLB appearance
- September 26, 1976, for the Houston Astros

MLB statistics
- Win–loss record: 1-3
- Earned run average: 4.60
- Strikeouts: 36
- Stats at Baseball Reference

Teams
- Houston Astros (1975–1976)

José Ynocencio Sosa (December 28, 1952 – June 8, 2013) was a Dominican relief pitcher in Major League Baseball who played from 1975 through 1976 for the Houston Astros. Listed at 5' 11", 158 lb., he batted and threw right-handed.

Born in Santo Domingo, Sosa came from a baseball family that included his cousins Felipe Alou, Matty Alou, Jesús Alou and Moisés Alou, being also related to Mel Rojas.

Sosa was signed by the Houston Astros as an amateur free agent in 1970 and started his career in their minor league system, playing for them at three different levels before joining the big club late in the 1975 midseason.

During a game against the San Diego Padres on July 30, 1975, Sosa secured his place in the record books when he belted a three-run home run off Danny Frisella at the Astrodome, to become both the first Dominican pitcher and the first Astros player ever to hit a home run in his first major league plate appearance. He also earned the save as the Astros came out with an 8–4 victory.

Sosa spent most of 1976 at Triple A and rejoined the Astros for a few games during three recalls. He then returned to the minors from 1977 to 1978 and never appeared in a major league game again.

In a two-season career, Sosa posted a 1–3 record with one save and a 4.60 earned run average in 34 games (two starts), allowing nine runs on 67 hits and six walks, while striking out 36 over 58 2/3 innings of work. He went 41–53 with a 4.25 ERA in 202 minor league games.

Sosa also pitched for the Leones del Escogido of the Dominican Winter League from 1977 to 1978. He finished with a 9–13 record and a 2.96 ERA in 111 games. Following his playing retirement, he served as their bullpen coach for several seasons.

== See also ==
- Alou family
- List of Major League Baseball players with a home run in their first major league at bat
