= Mark Lemongello =

American baseball player (born 1955)

- Pitcher
- Born: July 21, 1955 (age 71); Jersey City, New Jersey, U.S.
- Batted: Right Threw: Right

MLB debut
- September 14, 1976, for the Houston Astros

Last MLB appearance
- July 23, 1979, for the Toronto Blue Jays

MLB statistics
- Win–loss record: 22–38
- Earned run average: 4.06
- Strikeouts: 209
- Stats at Baseball Reference

Teams
- Houston Astros (1976–1978); Toronto Blue Jays (1979)

Mark Lemongello ("le-MAHNJ-ul-oh"; born July 21, 1955) is an American former professional baseball player who pitched in Major League Baseball from 1976 to 1979 for the Houston Astros and the Toronto Blue Jays. He is the cousin of singer Peter Lemongello.

Lemongello was raised in Hazlet, New Jersey, and signed as a free agent out of Raritan High School by the Detroit Tigers a week and a half before his 18th birthday in 1973.

Lemongello was known throughout his career for his erratic, sometimes violent behavior, which sometimes overshadowed his on-field accomplishments. He would often furiously slap himself in the face after a bad inning, and after bad games he was known to destroy locker room equipment such as hair dryers and light fixtures in fits of anger. Lemongello admitted to reporter Allen Abel: "My head was messed up."

Lemongello was traded along with Leon Roberts, Terry Humphrey and Gene Pentz from the Tigers to the Astros for Milt May, Dave Roberts and Jim Crawford on December 6, 1975. After spending three seasons with Houston, where he compiled a 21–29 record, Lemongello was traded to the Toronto Blue Jays, almost immediately upsetting the Toronto fanbase by asking if Canadians "spoke American." His tenure with Toronto was little short of disastrous, as Lemongello spent half a season with the club going 1–9. In his final start, on June 3, he fired a baseball at manager Roy Hartsfield when Hartsfield came to remove him from the game. Lemongello continued making occasional relief appearances until late July, when he was sent down to the minors after a screaming match with Hartsfield. When informed he was being sent down to the Syracuse Chiefs, he threw an ashtray at the head of Blue Jays general manager Peter Bavasi, barely missing him.

Lemongello never appeared in another major league game. Sold to the Chicago Cubs in 1980, his playing career ended that same year with the Triple-A Wichita Aeros.

In 1982, a few years after leaving baseball, Lemongello and Manuel Seoane, a former Wichita teammate, were arrested for the kidnapping and robbery of Lemongello's cousins Mike Lemongello, a former professional bowler, and Peter Lemongello. Lemongello was sentenced to seven years probation after he pleaded no contest to the charges. By 1989, he was living in Phoenix, Arizona, working for Coca-Cola.
