= Terry Humphrey =

American baseball player (born 1949)

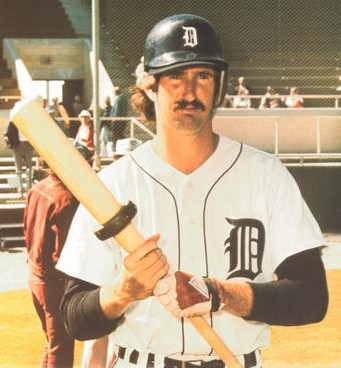
- Humphrey in 1975
- Catcher
- Born: August 4, 1949 (age 77); Chickasha, Oklahoma, U.S.
- Batted: Right Threw: Right

MLB debut
- September 5, 1971, for the Montreal Expos

Last MLB appearance
- June 11, 1979, for the California Angels

MLB statistics
- Batting average: .211
- Home runs: 6
- Runs batted in: 85
- Stats at Baseball Reference

Teams
- Montreal Expos (1971–1974); Detroit Tigers (1975); California Angels (1976–1979)

Terryal Gene Humphrey (born August 4, 1949) is an American former professional baseball player. A catcher, he appeared in 415 games played over all or parts of nine Major League Baseball seasons for the Montreal Expos (1971–1974), Detroit Tigers (1975) and California Angels (1976–1979). He threw and batted right-handed, stood 6 feet 3 inches (1.91 m) tall and weighed 185 pounds (84 kg).

Humphrey was born in Chickasha, Oklahoma, but graduated from Carson High School in Southern California and attended Los Angeles City College and the University of Nebraska–Lincoln. He was selected in the 39th round of the 1969 Major League Baseball draft by the Expos, a first-year expansion team; pitcher Balor Moore (the Expos' top pick) and outfielder Tony Scott (71st round) were also members of that draft class. When Humphrey was recalled from minor league baseball in September 1971, he became the second product (after Moore) of the Expo farm system to reach the major leagues.

Offensive struggles characterized Humphrey's MLB career and, except for two seasons (1972, when he started 65 games for Montreal, and 1977, when he started 111 games and caught in 123 contests for the Angels), he was a reserve catcher. He was traded along with Tom Walker from the Expos to the Tigers for Woodie Fryman on December 4, 1974. He was dealt along with Leon Roberts, Gene Pentz and Mark Lemongello from the Tigers to the Houston Astros for Milt May, Dave Roberts and Jim Crawford one year later on December 6, 1975.

His finest season came with the Angels in 1977 when he set career bests in games played (123), at bats (304), hits (69), doubles (11), home runs (2) and runs batted in (34).

For his career, he batted .211 with 223 hits, six homers and 85 RBI.
