= Cliff Johnson (baseball) =

American baseball player (born 1947)

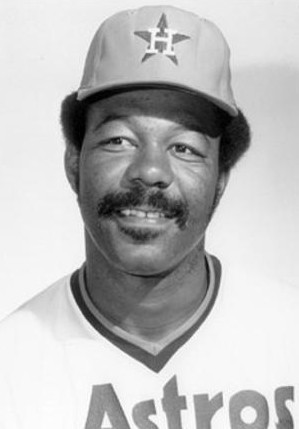
- Johnson in 1976
- Designated hitter / First baseman / Catcher
- Born: July 22, 1947 (age 78); San Antonio, Texas, U.S.
- Batted: Right Threw: Right

MLB debut
- September 13, 1972, for the Houston Astros

Last MLB appearance
- September 30, 1986, for the Toronto Blue Jays

MLB statistics
- Batting average: .258
- Home Runs: 196
- Runs batted in: 699
- Stats at Baseball Reference

Teams
- Houston Astros (1972–1977); New York Yankees (1977–1979); Cleveland Indians (1979–1980); Chicago Cubs (1980); Oakland Athletics (1981–1982); Toronto Blue Jays (1983–1984); Texas Rangers (1985); Toronto Blue Jays (1985–1986)

Career highlights and awards
- 2× World Series champion (1977, 1978)

Clifford "Heathcliff" Johnson, Jr. (born July 22, 1947) is an American former Major League Baseball player who played for the Houston Astros (1972–1977), New York Yankees (1977–1979), Cleveland Indians (1979–1980), Chicago Cubs (1980), Oakland Athletics (1981–82), Toronto Blue Jays (1983–84, 1985–1986) and Texas Rangers (1985). He batted and threw right-handed and split time between catcher, first baseman, and outfielder in the early part of his Major League career before becoming primarily a full-time designated hitter.

== Career ==
As a catcher at San Antonio's Wheatley High School in 1965, Johnson was the 83rd pick in the 1966 baseball draft by the Houston Astros. After six seasons in the minor leagues, he made his major league debut on September 13, 1972, and played for the Astros until partway through the 1977 season, when he was traded to the Yankees.

Johnson was a member of the 1977 and 1978 Yankees World Series championship teams, both over the Los Angeles Dodgers. On April 19, 1979, following a Yankee loss to the Baltimore Orioles, Reggie Jackson started kidding Johnson about his inability to hit Goose Gossage. While Johnson was showering, Gossage insisted to Jackson that he struck out Johnson all the time when he used to face him. (Johnson only batted three times against Gossage in the National League in 1977 as a Houston Astro while Gossage was with the Pirates, going 0 for 3 with two strikeouts) "He either homers or strikes out", Gossage said. When Jackson relayed this information to Johnson upon his return to the locker room, a fight started between him and Gossage. Gossage tore ligaments in his right thumb and missed three months of the season which cost the Yankees a chance to win their third consecutive World Series title. Yankees owner George Steinbrenner fined both Johnson and Gossage. Teammate Tommy John called it "a demoralizing blow to the team." Johnson was traded to Cleveland two months after the brawl.

As a member of the Blue Jays in the mid-1980s, Johnson was a fan favorite at Exhibition Stadium until his retirement on September 30, 1986.

In a 15-season major League career, Johnson posted a .258 batting average with 196 home runs and 699 RBI in 1369 games played. Johnson held the MLB record for pinch hit home runs with 20 until he was surpassed by Matt Stairs in 2010.

== Personal ==
Johnson is the brother-in-law of retired Major League left fielder Mike Easler.
