= Bob Watson =

American baseball player and coach (1946–2020)

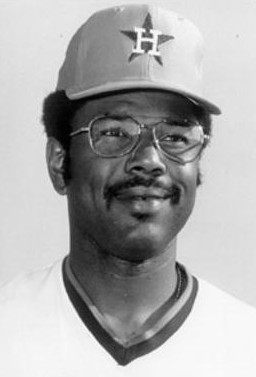
- Watson in 1976
- First baseman / Left fielder
- Born: April 10, 1946; Los Angeles, California, U.S.
- Died: May 14, 2020 (aged 74); Houston, Texas, U.S.
- Batted: Right Threw: Right

MLB debut
- September 9, 1966, for the Houston Astros

Last MLB appearance
- September 30, 1984, for the Atlanta Braves

MLB statistics
- Batting average: .295
- Home runs: 184
- Runs batted in: 989
- Stats at Baseball Reference

Teams
- As player: Houston Astros (1966–1979); Boston Red Sox (1979); New York Yankees (1980–1982); Atlanta Braves (1982–1984); As coach: Oakland Athletics (1985–1988)

Career highlights and awards
- 2× All-Star (1973, 1975); Houston Astros Hall of Fame

Robert José Watson (April 10, 1946 – May 14, 2020) was an American professional baseball player, coach and general manager. He played in Major League Baseball as a first baseman and left fielder from 1966 to 1984, most prominently as a member of the Houston Astros where he was a two-time All-Star player. Watson had a .295 batting average over a career that also saw him play for the Boston Red Sox, New York Yankees, and the Atlanta Braves.

After retiring as a player, Watson was a coach for the Oakland Athletics for four years, before he joined the Astros’ front office. In 1993, he became the second African-American general manager in major league baseball history with the Astros. He then served as the Yankees general manager from October 23, 1995 until February 2, 1998, during which time the team won the 1996 World Series. Watson became the first African-American general manager to operate a team which would win the World Series. He later served as MLB's vice president in charge of discipline and vice president of rules and on-field operations, from 2002 to 2010. In 2020, Watson was inducted into the Houston Astros Hall of Fame.

== Early life and amateur career ==
Watson was born in Los Angeles on April 10, 1946. His parents separated prior to his birth, and his grandparents raised him. Watson attended John C. Fremont High School, where he played for the school's baseball team as a catcher. Fremont won the 1963 city championship; Watson's high school teammates included future major-leaguers Willie Crawford and Bobby Tolan. Watson went on to attend Los Angeles Harbor College.

== Professional playing career ==
The Houston Astros signed Watson as an amateur free agent in January 1965. He nearly quit baseball while playing in Minor League Baseball for an affiliate based in Savannah, Georgia, due to segregation in restaurants and hotels. Nicknamed "Bull", Watson converted to first base and the outfield by the time he made his major league debut with the Astros on September 9, 1966. Watson was a dependable hitter whose home run numbers were somewhat hurt by the fact that he played the majority of his career in the Astrodome, which had a reputation for being a pitcher-friendly ballpark.

From 1966 through 1970, Watson appeared in less than 100 games each season for the Astros, batting .259, with 14 home runs, and 74 runs batted in (RBI) overall. From 1971 through 1978, Watson appeared in at least 129 games each season, batting .303, with 122 home runs, and 690 RBI altogether. He was selected as an All-Star twice; in 1973 and 1975. On June 24, 1977, Watson hit for the cycle in a 6–5 win over the San Francisco Giants. In total, during his 14 seasons with the Astros, Watson appeared in 1,381 games, batting .297, with 139 home runs, and 781 RBI.

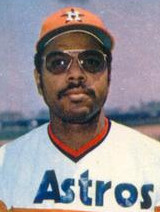
Watson, circa 1977

On June 13, 1979, the Astros traded Watson to the Red Sox in exchange for Pete Ladd, cash, and a player to be named later (who turned out to be Bobby Sprowl). Watson played 84 games for the Red Sox through the remainder of the season. He batted .337 with 13 home runs and 53 RBI. On September 15, 1979, Watson again hit for the cycle. Having already hit for the cycle with the Astros in 1977, he became the first player to accomplish this feat in both the National League (NL) and American League (AL).

Following the season, Watson signed as a free agent with the New York Yankees. With the Yankees, he reached the post-season for the first time in his career, losing to the Kansas City Royals in the 1980 American League Championship Series. A year later, Watson reached the World Series for the only time in his career. Watson hit two home runs and batted .318 with seven RBIs, but the Yankees lost to the Los Angeles Dodgers in six games.

Watson was nearly dealt along with Oscar Gamble and Mike Morgan from the Yankees to the Texas Rangers for Al Oliver prior to the 1982 regular season, but the transaction was squashed by Gamble whose contract had a list of eight teams to which he can be traded which did not include the Rangers. He was subsequently traded to the Atlanta Braves for Scott Patterson on April 23, 1982. Watson helped propel the Braves to the 1982 National League West title. In 1983, Watson hit .309 mostly as a pinch hitter. He retired after the 1984 season.

In his MLB career — 19 years and 1,832 regular season games played — Watson batted .295, with 184 home runs, and 989 RBI. He batted .371 in 17 postseason games.

=== Millionth run ===
Watson was credited with scoring the 1,000,000th run in major league history on Sunday, May 4, 1975, at 12:32 in the afternoon. Watson scored from second base on a three-run homer by teammate Milt May at San Francisco's Candlestick Park. It was known that the 999,999th run had already scored, with sponsored updates being provided by and to every ballpark. Despite the lack of in-game urgency, Watson ran at full speed, reaching home plate approximately four seconds before Dave Concepción, who had just homered in Cincinnati and was also racing around the basepaths. "I never ran so fast in my entire life," said Concepcion. But it was Watson who won $10,000 and one million Tootsie Rolls provided by the event's sponsor. The 1,000,000th run total only included runs scored in the National and American Leagues (not "third" major leagues, such as the Federal League). Watson joked that in the aftermath of the event, his fan mail doubled—from four letters to eight. Later, more accurate recalculations of baseball's record-keeping showed that neither Watson nor Concepcion scored baseball's actual millionth run, and it is not known who did.

== Post-playing career ==
=== Coach and general manager ===
After retirement, Watson moved into coaching and was the hitting coach for the Oakland Athletics for four years. The Astros hired Watson as their assistant general manager after the 1988 season.

At the end of the 1993 season, Watson was named general manager of the Astros, becoming the second African American (following the Atlanta Braves' Bill Lucas) to serve as a GM in the major leagues. After the 1995 season, the Yankees hired Watson away from Houston to serve as their general manager. He served as GM for the Yankees from October 23, 1995, to February 2, 1998. The 1996 team won the World Series, the first Yankee team to do so since 1978. Thus, Watson became the first African American general manager to win a World Series championship.

=== MLB executive ===
After the 1997 season, Watson retired from the Yankees. He served as MLB's vice president in charge of discipline and vice president of rules and on-field operations, beginning in 2002. In 2007 he was under consideration for a return engagement as the Astros general manager.

In 2000, Watson worked with USA Baseball to select the team roster competing in baseball at the 2000 Summer Olympics. The United States national baseball team won the gold medal.

Watson drew criticism late in the 2007 season. Under his watch, MLB mandated that managers could no longer wear a team issued pullover instead of a uniform jersey top. This caused particular friction between MLB and Red Sox manager Terry Francona, who prefers to wear a pullover due to circulation problems.

"There's going to be, for lack of a better term, a Francona Rule," Watson said. "You can only wear your uniform top or jacket. You can't wear your nightshirt, or whatever it is. You can wear it before games, or after games, but not during games. You have to have your uniform top at all times."

During the second inning of a Red Sox-Yankees game on August 28, an MLB representative arrived to verify that Francona was wearing a uniform jersey. The Boston media saw this as frivolous, or even biased, due to the public's alleged indifference toward the issue, the specific use of Francona as an example, and the fact that the representative appeared during an important in-division matchup.

Watson retired from his position with MLB in 2010.

== Personal life ==
Watson and his wife, Carol, had two children.

While playing for Houston, Watson, along with several teammates, had a cameo appearance in the 1977 movie The Bad News Bears in Breaking Training.

Watson was diagnosed with prostate cancer in March 1994, which was successfully treated. Watson wrote about his experience with prostate cancer in his 1997 book, Survive To Win, and spoke regularly at cancer awareness conferences and with players and staff in Major League Baseball. Watson's advocacy has been credited with detecting and treating many MLB personnel, including Joe Torre.

In 1999, Watson completed a Bachelor of Science degree with a concentration in sports management at New York's Empire State College.

Watson was diagnosed with stage 4 kidney disease in 2016. He died on May 14, 2020, from that illness at the age of 74.

== See also ==
- Houston Astros award winners and league leaders
- List of Major League Baseball players to hit for the cycle

Awards and achievements
Preceded by Don Sutton	Major League Player of the Month; May 1972	Succeeded by César Cedeño
Preceded by Joe Morgan	National League Player of the Month; May 1975	Succeeded by Joe Morgan
Preceded by Mike Hegan; Dan Ford	Hitting for the cycle June 24, 1977; September 15, 1979	Succeeded by John Mayberry; Frank White
Sporting positions
Preceded by Bill Wood	Houston Astros General Manager; 1994–1995	Succeeded by Gerry Hunsicker
Preceded by Gene Michael	New York Yankees General Manager; 1995–1997	Succeeded by Brian Cashman
