= Roger Metzger =

American baseball player (born 1947)

- Metzger in 1971 photo
- Shortstop
- Born: October 10, 1947 (age 79); Fredericksburg, Texas, U.S.
- Batted: Switch Threw: Right

MLB debut
- June 16, 1970, for the Chicago Cubs

Last MLB appearance
- August 10, 1980, for the San Francisco Giants

MLB statistics
- Batting average: .231
- Home runs: 5
- Runs batted in: 254
- Stats at Baseball Reference

Teams
- Chicago Cubs (1970); Houston Astros (1971–1978); San Francisco Giants (1978–1980)

Career highlights and awards
- Gold Glove Award (1973)

Roger Henry Metzger (pronounced "Mets-ger", born October 10, 1947) is an American former Major League Baseball shortstop who played most of his career for the Houston Astros (1971–1978). He also played for the Chicago Cubs (1970) and the San Francisco Giants (1978–1980). A light-hitting shortstop, he was known for his strong defense and good running speed. He retired at age 32 because of the after-effects of a hand injury.

== Career ==
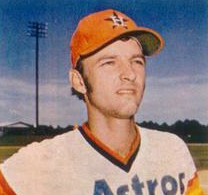
Metzger in baseball card

Metzger graduated high school from Holy Cross of San Antonio and then attended St. Edward's University. He was selected in the 1st round (16th overall) of the 1969 Major League Baseball draft by the Chicago Cubs, and he made his debut for them a year later.

Metzger won the 1973 Gold Glove Award at shortstop, the first one for an Astro at the position; no Astro shortstop would win a Gold Glove Award for the next 48 years. He led the National League in triples in 1971 (11) and 1973 (14). He led the National League in outs (528) in 1972.

On November 29, 1979, Metzger lost the tips of four fingers on his right hand (index to pinky) in an electric table-saw accident. He had been building a wooden playhouse for his children as a Christmas present. Metzger attempted a comeback for the 1980 season, but was released by the San Francisco Giants on August 10, 1980, after only hitting .074 in 28 games. Immediately after being released, he was re-signed by the Giants as a coach for the remainder of the season.

In 11 seasons Metzger played in 1,219 games and had 4,201 at bats, 453 runs, 972 hits, 101 doubles, 71 triples, five home runs, 254 RBI, 83 stolen bases, 355 walks, .231 batting average, .291 on-base percentage, .293 slugging percentage, 1,230 total bases, 90 sacrifice hits, 22 sacrifice flies and 34 intentional walks. He played over 1,000 games for the Astros, a mark achieved by only 21 players in franchise history.

== Personal life ==
A graduate of St. Edward's University in 1970, the school retired his jersey in June 2005.

== See also ==
- Houston Astros award winners and league leaders
- List of Houston Astros team records
- List of Major League Baseball annual triples leaders
- St. Edward's University notable alumni

== Sources ==
- Career statistics from Baseball Reference · Baseball Reference (Minors) · Retrosheet · Baseball Almanac, or Retrosheet
