= Jim Crawford (baseball) =

American baseball player (born 1950)

- Pitcher
- Born: September 29, 1950 (age 75); Chicago, Illinois, U.S.
- Batted: Left Threw: Left

MLB debut
- April 6, 1973, for the Houston Astros

Last MLB appearance
- July 27, 1978, for the Detroit Tigers

MLB statistics
- Win–loss record: 15–28
- Earned run average: 4.40
- Strikeouts: 276
- Stats at Baseball Reference

Teams
- Houston Astros (1973, 1975); Detroit Tigers (1976–1978)

James Frederick Crawford (born September 29, 1950) is an American former professional baseball pitcher. Crawford pitched in all or part of five seasons in Major League Baseball between 1973 and 1978. He appeared in 181 games, all but 14 in relief.

== High school ==
Jim attended Rincon High School in Tucson, Arizona. He was originally drafted right out go high school in the 14th round (324th overall) of the 1969 June Baseball draft by the San Diego Padres but did not sign and chose to pitch at Arizona State University. After his four years there, he was drafted in the 14th round (321st overall) of the 1972 June Baseball draft by the Houston Astros.

== Major-league career ==
Crawford was traded along with Milt May and Dave Roberts from the Astros to the Detroit Tigers for Leon Roberts, Terry Humphrey, Gene Pentz and Mark Lemongello on December 6, 1975.
