= Al Javier =

Dominican baseball player (born 1954)

- Outfielder
- Born: February 4, 1954 (age 72); San Pedro de Macorís, Dominican Republic
- Batted: Right Threw: Right

MLB debut
- September 9, 1976, for the Houston Astros

Last MLB appearance
- October 1, 1976, for the Houston Astros

MLB statistics
- Batting average: .208
- Home runs: 0
- Runs batted in: 0
- Stats at Baseball Reference

Teams
- Houston Astros (1976)

Ignacio Alfredo Wilkes Javier (born February 4, 1954) is a Dominican former Major League Baseball (MLB) outfielder. He played in eight games for the Houston Astros in 1976, going 5-for-24.

== Baseball career ==
Javier was signed as an undrafted free agent by the Houston Astros in 1971.

== Sources ==
- Career statistics from Baseball Reference · Baseball Reference (Minors) · Retrosheet · Baseball Almanac
