= Hits per nine innings =

Baseball statistic

In baseball statistics, hits per nine innings (denoted by H/9) is the average number of hits allowed by a pitcher in a nine inning period; calculated as: (hits allowed x 9) / innings pitched. This is a measure of a pitcher's success based on the number of all outs he records.

Compared to a pitcher's batting average against, a pitcher's H/9 benefits from sacrifice bunts, double plays, runners caught stealing, and outfield assist, but it is hurt by some errors. Unlike batting average against, a pitcher's H/9 benefits from outs that are not related to official at bats, as they are recorded on runners after they have reached base.

As of June 2024, Nolan Ryan is the career leader (6.5553), Sandy Koufax is #2 (6.7916), Clayton Kershaw is #3 (6.8160).

== See also ==
- Walks plus hits per inning pitched (WHIP)
