= Greg Gross =

American baseball player & coach (born 1952)

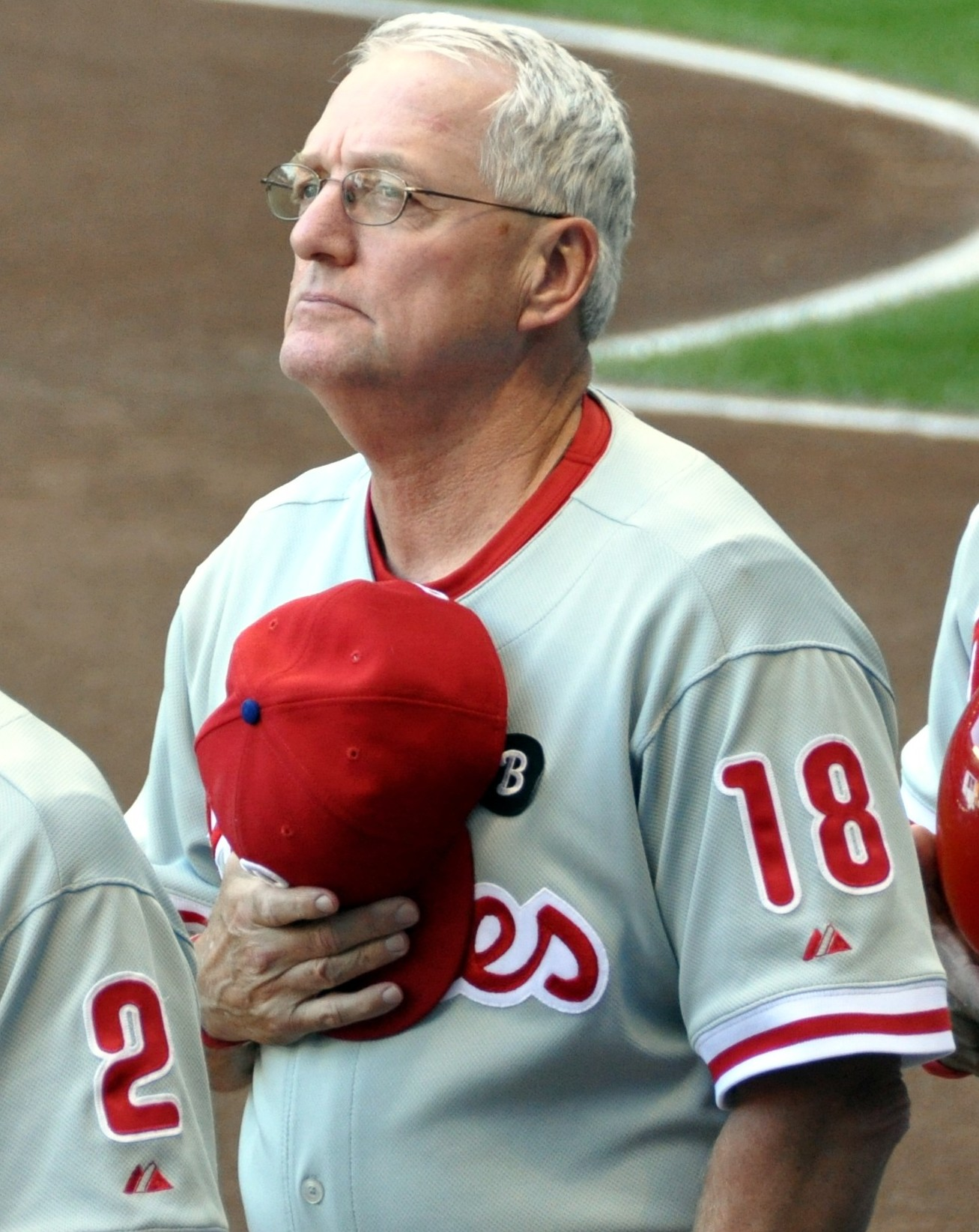
- Gross with the Philadelphia Phillies in 2011
- Outfielder
- Born: August 1, 1952 (age 74); Goldsboro, Pennsylvania, U.S.
- Batted: Left Threw: Left

MLB debut
- September 5, 1973, for the Houston Astros

Last MLB appearance
- September 27, 1989, for the Houston Astros

MLB statistics
- Batting average: .287
- Home runs: 7
- Runs batted in: 308
- Stats at Baseball Reference

Teams
- As player: Houston Astros (1973–1976); Chicago Cubs (1977–1978); Philadelphia Phillies (1979–1988); Houston Astros (1989); As coach: Philadelphia Phillies (2001–2004, 2010–2012)

Career highlights and awards
- World Series champion (1980)

Gregory Eugene Gross (born August 1, 1952) is an American former professional baseball outfielder and pinch hitter who played 17 seasons in Major League Baseball (MLB), primarily for the Philadelphia Phillies. He was previously the Phillies' hitting coach and a former manager for the Reno Aces, the Arizona Diamondbacks' Triple-A affiliate.

Gross is perhaps best remembered for his clutch pinch hitting abilities, particularly during the Phillies' 1980 World Championship run. He holds the team’s record in career pinch hits, with 117. Gross also ranks fifth on MLB’s all-time list in career pinch hits, with 143. Gross holds the MLB record for pinch hit walks with 117.

== Early life and education ==
Born in York, Pennsylvania, Gross graduated from Red Land High School in Lewisberry, Pennsylvania.

== Career ==
=== Early career ===
On June 4, 1970, Gross was selected by the Houston Astros in the fourth round (79th overall) of the June Baseball draft. He led the league in hits in 1970 while playing for Covington in the Appalachian League, batting .351. He also tied for the league lead in double plays by outfielders.

In 1971, Gross was promoted to the Columbus Astros of the Southern League, where he played outfield and first base. In 1972, Gross played most of the season at Columbus, then was promoted to the Oklahoma City 89ers, which was the Astros' AAA farm club. In 1973, Gross started the season with the Denver Bears, which by that point had become the Astros' new AAA farm club.

=== Houston Astros ===
1975 photo of Gross for Houston Astros

The Astros decided to call up Gross late in 1973. On September 5, 1973, Gross made his MLB debut with the Astros, going 0-for-1 (ground out to third baseman Denis Menke) as a pinch hitter against pitcher Pedro Borbon, which was the last out of the ninth inning in a game that went extra innings and ended in a 9-3 loss to the Cincinnati Reds at the Astrodome. Gross finished the season going 9-for-39, for a .231 average.

In 1974, Gross became the Astros' starting right fielder and leadoff hitter, playing in 156 games and batting .314. Gross was named The Sporting News' National League Rookie Player of the Year and finished second in the voting for National League Rookie of the Year. Gross also finished the season with a .393 on-base percentage, giving him one of the highest on-base percentages of any rookie since 1970. In 1974, Gross also set a major league record for most times caught stealing in a rookie season with 20. In 1975 and 1976, Gross continued to be a starting outfielder for the Astros, hitting .294 and .286, respectively. The 1975 season saw him reach base in 52 straight games. Nearly half of his hits (142) and walks (63) in the season came during the streak, which saw him collect 70 hits and 30 walks from June 25 to August 18. The streak tied Jimmy Wynn (1969) for the longest on-base streak in franchise history, a record that stands as of 2022.

=== Chicago Cubs ===
Gross was traded from the Astros to the Cubs for Julio González at the Winter Meetings on December 8, 1976. In 1977, Gross hit his first major-league home run, connecting a total of five times while hitting .322 in 115 games.

=== Philadelphia Phillies ===
1982 photo of Gross for Philadelphia Phillies

After a busy 1978 season, Gross was traded by the Cubs on February 23, 1979 to the Philadelphia Phillies with Manny Trillo and Dave Rader for Jerry Martin, Barry Foote, Ted Sizemore, Derek Botelho and Henry Mack. Gross established himself as a key platoon outfielder and first baseman for the Phillies, getting to play in the 1980 National League Championship Series (he went 3-for-4—all pinch hits—with one RBI in four games), the 1980 World Series (0-for-2 in four games), the 1983 NL Championship Series (0-for-5 in four games with a run scored), and in the 1983 World Series (0-for-6 in 2 games). Gross was an invaluable pinch hitter. In 1982, he led the league in pinch hits with 19.

Gross has said he had hoped to be a full-time player for the Phillies in the late 1970s and early 1980s, but the team just had too many other talented outfielders, namely Bake McBride, Greg Luzinski, Garry Maddox, and Lonnie Smith. "I...didn't figure I should be playing part-time at that point in my career," Gross told the San Diego Union-Tribune in an article that appeared on March 18, 1991. "But they had those three guys and I knew they should be playing ahead of me. Plus, they were winning and that changes your thinking a lot. Before, I was playing on second-division teams and we were out of it pretty early. But when you get your first taste of winning, when you're in the playoffs and the World Series, you want more of it."

In addition, Gross acknowledged in an interview in 2007 the difficulty of being a starting player when he was neither fast nor a power hitter. "The cycle that baseball was in back then, with the AstroTurf and everything, centered on the stolen base or the home run, and I did neither of those," Gross told The Patriot-News of Harrisburg in an article that was published on April 8, 2007. "It was just a matter of survival. You made the best out of it. The big break for me was when I got onto a real good club."

Gross remained with the Phillies through the 1988 season, in which he hit just .203 in 133 at-bats but posted the unusual statistic of striking out just three times during the entire season. Over his entire career of 3,745 at-bats, Gross struck out just 250 times.

=== Later career ===
On April 5, 1989, Gross rejoined the Houston Astros as a free agent, hitting .200 largely in a pinch-hitting role. Despite his historic success as a prolific pinch-hitter, Gross struggled in 1989, hitting just .184 (7-for-38). In October 1989, as part of a rebuilding movement, the Astros told Gross and many other veterans—including Bob Forsch, Rick Rhoden, Dan Schatzeder, Terry Puhl and Harry Spilman—that they would not negotiate new contracts with them before the free agent filing period, which was to begin after the 1989 World Series, if at all. On November 2, 1989, Gross filed for free agency. Gross had hoped to be invited to a major-league club for a tryout in 1990. After a lockout by the owners in early 1990, Gross never received a single tryout, and he wound up sitting out the 1990 season.

Gross again tried to extend his baseball career. On February 7, 1991, the San Diego Padres announced that they had invited Gross to spring training. Gross came to spring training at the recommendation of his old teammate and then-Phillies coach Larry Bowa, who had asked then-Padres manager Greg Riddoch to invite Gross to camp. "I love this game so much," Gross told the Los Angeles Times in an article that appeared on February 28, 1991. "I can't leave it alone. It's not the money. It's not the attention. It's just being around this game. And I'm not going to cheat myself from playing as long as someone will let me."

On March 30, 1991, the Los Angeles Times reported that Gross had made the Padres as a pinch-hitter. However, on April 5, 1991, the Padres cut Gross, choosing instead to sign Mike Aldrete to its final roster spot. The move ended Gross' major-league career. Several weeks later, there was reported interest in Gross by the Boston Red Sox, according to a May 14, 1991 article in The Boston Globe, but nothing ever materialized.

"I've enjoyed my career, I really have," Gross told the San Diego Union-Tribune in March 1991. "There've been frustrations, sure, but the good times and being at this level of the game outweigh any of the negatives. I wanted to play every day, sure, but it didn't work out for me. But I found that niche and it worked out. Probably, if I'd been an everyday player, I wouldn't have lasted this long. I'd rather have the longevity."

== Pitching ==
Both in 1986 and in 1989, Gross was called to the pitcher's mound during blowouts. On June 8, 1986, Gross pitched the final two-thirds of the eighth inning in a 12–0 Phillies loss to the Montreal Expos. Gross gave up a double to Andrés Galarraga, and then struck out Casey Candaele and Herm Winningham to end the rout. And on May 21, 1989, Gross took the mound in the ninth inning of what wound up being a 17-5 loss by the Astros to the Pittsburgh Pirates. In that game, Gross had relieved shortstop Craig Reynolds, who had pitched the eighth inning. In the ninth inning, Gross gave up three hits and two earned runs. However, he also struck out José Lind swinging. "The worst part is how close you are to the batter after you throw the ball," Gross told the Sporting News in its June 5, 1989 issue. "I throw batting practice, but you've got the screen. I was looking for a way to sneak the screen out there."

== Coaching career ==
After his baseball career ended, Gross worked as a color commentator for several games for SportsChannel Philadelphia in 1991. He dabbled in real estate and coached at Malvern Prep High School. He returned to professional baseball on February 6, 1995, when the Colorado Rockies announced that Gross would make his debut as a professional coach with the Rockies' AA New Haven Ravens minor-league affiliate in New Haven, Connecticut. In 1995, Gross worked as a first-base coach for the Ravens, and then stayed with the club for the 1996 season as well. On October 24, 1996, the Rockies promoted Gross to become the Rockies' roving minor-league hitting instructor. He served in that capacity in 1997 through 2000. Gross quit the Rockies at the end of the 2000 season to become a bench coach for the Philadelphia Phillies in 2001. In 2002, Gross became the Phillies' hitting instructor. He remained the Phillies' hitting instructor through 2004.

On January 3, 2005, Gross became the hitting instructor for the Phillies' Class-A Batavia Muckdogs minor league team. On December 22, 2005, Gross was named the 2006 hitting coach for the Phillies' high-A Clearwater Threshers minor-league team. On November 28, 2006, Gross was named the hitting coach for the Phillies' Reading Phillies minor-league team. Then, on December 13, 2007, Gross was named the 2008 hitting coach for the Phillies' Triple-A Lehigh Valley IronPigs minor league team. On July 22, 2010, it was announced he would take over as hitting coach for the Philadelphia Phillies. On October 3, 2012, Gross was fired from his position of hitting coach by the Philadelphia Phillies when they decided not to renew his contract for the 2013 season.

Gross joined the Arizona Diamondbacks organization as the Triple A Reno Aces hitting coach for the 2013 season. In 2017, when Jerry Narron was named interim bench coach of the Diamondbacks, Gross became interim manager of the Aces. He returned as manager for the 2018 season, before being named as part of Chris Cron's coaching staff for the 2019 season. Although expected to return for the 2020 season, Gross essentially retired from coaching once Minor League Baseball announced the season's cancellation due to the COVID-19 pandemic.

== Personal life ==
Gross is twice married and has two children with his first wife. He lives in West Chester, Pennsylvania.

Gross is honored annually by the AGA with the Greg Gross Open (GGO) golf tournament held at the Anetsberger Golf Club in Northbrook, Illinois.

== See also ==
- Houston Astros award winners and league leaders
