= Jesús de la Rosa =

Dominican baseball player (born 1953)

- Pinch hitter
- Born: August 5, 1953 (age 73); Santo Domingo, Dominican Republic
- Batted: Right Threw: Right

MLB debut
- August 2, 1975, for the Houston Astros

Last MLB appearance
- August 6, 1975, for the Houston Astros

MLB statistics
- Games played: 3
- At bats: 3
- Hits: 1
- Stats at Baseball Reference

Teams
- Houston Astros (1975)

Jesús de la Rosa (born August 5, 1953) is a Dominican former professional baseball player whose career extended from 1969 through 1980. He appeared as a pinch hitter in three games in August 1975 in Major League Baseball for the Houston Astros, collecting one hit in three at bats, a double off Pete Falcone of the San Francisco Giants in the ninth inning of a 5–4 defeat at Candlestick Park on August 3. He advanced to third, then scored his only MLB run on a sacrifice fly by Enos Cabell.

De la Rosa stood 6 feet 1 inch (1.85 m) tall and weighed 153 pounds (69 kg); he threw and batted right-handed. In minor league baseball, de la Rosa was an outfielder, first baseman and third baseman. He appeared in 793 games, mostly in the Astro farm system.

He is the stepfather of former MLB outfielder Danny Bautista.
