= Alex Taveras =

Dominican baseball player (born 1953)

- Infielder
- Born: October 9, 1953 (age 72); Santiago, Dominican Republic
- Batted: Right Threw: Right

MLB debut
- September 9, 1976, for the Houston Astros

Last MLB appearance
- October 2, 1983, for the Los Angeles Dodgers

MLB statistics
- Batting average: .208
- Games played: 35
- At bats: 53
- Stats at Baseball Reference

Teams
- Houston Astros (1976); Los Angeles Dodgers (1982–1983)

Alejandro Antonio Betances Taveras (born October 9, 1953) is a Dominican former infielder in Major League Baseball. He played in 35 games over three seasons (1976, 1982–1983) for the Houston Astros and Los Angeles Dodgers.

Taveras managed the Dominican Republic national baseball team at the 2001 Baseball World Cup.

Taveras has three sons: Alex Jr., Smil, and Joshua. He is a coach for the Aguilas Cibaenas of the Dominican Winter League.
