= Dave Roberts (pitcher) =

American baseball player (1944–2009)

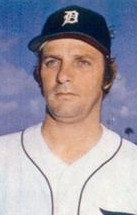
- Pitcher
- Born: September 11, 1944; Gallipolis, Ohio, U.S.
- Died: January 9, 2009 (aged 64); Short Gap, West Virginia, U.S.
- Batted: Left Threw: Left

MLB debut
- July 6, 1969, for the San Diego Padres

Last MLB appearance
- May 16, 1981, for the New York Mets

MLB statistics
- Win–loss record: 103–125
- Earned run average: 3.78
- Strikeouts: 957
- Stats at Baseball Reference

Teams
- San Diego Padres (1969–1971); Houston Astros (1972–1975); Detroit Tigers (1976–1977); Chicago Cubs (1977–1978); San Francisco Giants (1979); Pittsburgh Pirates (1979–1980); Seattle Mariners (1980); New York Mets (1981)

Career highlights and awards
- World Series champion (1979)

David Arthur Roberts (September 11, 1944 – January 9, 2009) was an American professional baseball player. He played in Major League Baseball as a left-handed pitcher from 1969 to 1981 for eight teams. He was second in the National League (NL) with a 2.10 earned run average (ERA) in 1971 for the San Diego Padres, after which he was traded to the Houston Astros, where he spent the four most productive years of his career. Roberts was also a member of the 1979 World Series winning Pittsburgh Pirates team. Over his major league career he won 103 games.

Roberts was one of the best Jewish pitchers all-time in major league history through 2010, ranking fourth in career games (445; behind only Scott Schoeneweis, Ken Holtzman, and John Grabow), fourth in wins (103) and strikeouts (957) behind Sandy Koufax, Holtzman, and Steve Stone, and seventh in ERA (3.78).

== Early and personal life ==
Roberts was born in Gallipolis, Ohio, and was Jewish. He attended George Washington elementary school, and then started high school at Gallia Academy, finally moving to and in 1963 graduating from Central High School in Columbus, Ohio, where his parents had relocated. In basketball, he was All-Columbus.

== Minor league career ==
Roberts was signed in June 1963 as an undrafted amateur free agent by the Philadelphia Phillies.

He played on farm clubs for the Phillies, Kansas City A's, and Pittsburgh Pirates (who claimed him on waivers in April 1964 for $8,000 ($83,000 in current dollar terms), and was chosen by San Diego with the 39th pick in the 1968 Major League Baseball expansion draft.

Pitching for the 1963 Spartanburg Phillies he was 9–3 with a 1.79 ERA, Class-A Western Carolina League and throwing three shutouts in his 17 starts. In 1966, he pitched for Aguilas in the Dominican Winter League, posting an ERA of 2.17 in 108 innings. Roberts was 1968 Pitcher of the Year for the International League Columbus Jets, after going 18–5.

In the minor leagues from 1963 to 1969, he was 65–32 with a 3.00 ERA.

== Major league career ==
=== San Diego Padres ===
After debuting with the Padres in 1969, Roberts was sixth in the NL in walks per 9 innings (2.13) in 1970. He went 14–17 for the last-place 1971 Padres, finishing second to the New York Mets' Tom Seaver with a 2.10 ERA. He was sixth in the voting for the NL Cy Young Award, seventh in walks per 9 innings (2.04), ninth in innings pitched (269 2/3), tenth in complete games (14), and 24th in the voting for the NL MVP Award. He held batters to a .191 batting average when runners were in scoring position.

=== Houston Astros ===
Roberts was traded from the Padres to the Houston Astros for Derrel Thomas, Bill Greif, and Mark Schaeffer on December 3, 1971. His being traded by the Padres was just prior to the Padres signing another Dave Roberts (see below), who joined the club in 1972. If this trade had not taken place, the Padres' roster would have featured two unrelated players named "Dave Roberts", making this among the few occasions where a team's roster featured two unrelated players with the same name.

In 1972, Roberts was 12–7 for the Astros. In 1973, he recorded a career-best 17–11 record, setting a club record with a career-high six shutouts (second in the NL). Roberts was the August 25, 1974 NL Player of the Week. That season, he finished sixth in the NL in wins and sacrifice hits (12), seventh in games started (36), eighth in complete games (12), and tenth in ERA (2.85) and walks per nine innings (2.24).

=== Detroit Tigers ===
Roberts was dealt along with Milt May and Jim Crawford from the Astros to the Detroit Tigers for Leon Roberts, Terry Humphrey, Gene Pentz and Mark Lemongello on December 6, 1975. After a 16–17 season with the 1976 Tigers, in which he was fifth in the American League (AL) in shutouts (4), seventh in games started (36) and ninth in complete games (18), he had surgery on his knee. On the final day of the 1976 season, Roberts gave up Hank Aaron's final career hit and RBI in the sixth inning. Aaron was lifted for a pinch runner.

In 1977, Roberts was the Opening Day starter for the Tigers.

=== Chicago Cubs ===
In July 1977, the Chicago Cubs purchased Roberts' contract.

In 1978, Roberts batted .327 for the Cubs, with a .500 slugging percentage, in 52 at bats, which is the 13th highest batting average for a pitcher in the designated hitter era.

=== 1979: Giants and Pirates ===
In February 1979, Roberts signed as free agent with the San Francisco Giants.

Roberts was traded along with Bill Madlock and Lenny Randle from the Giants to the Pittsburgh Pirates for Al Holland, Ed Whitson and Fred Breining on June 28, 1979. Combined, in 1979 he had a 2.90 ERA.

=== Later career ===
After pitching just two games for the Pirates in 1980, Roberts was purchased by the Seattle Mariners in April. He pitched the rest of the season in Seattle, going 2–3 in 37 games, mostly as a reliever. Following that season, Roberts became a free agent.

In January 1981, he was signed with the Mets. He pitched just seven games for New York, going 0–3 with a 9.39 ERA, before being released in May. In June, Roberts was signed as a free agent by the Giants, but never pitched for them in the majors.

Among Jewish pitchers all-time in major league history through 2010, Roberts ranks fourth in career appearances (445; behind only Scott Schoeneweis, Ken Holtzman, and John Grabow), fourth in wins (103) and strikeouts (957) behind Sandy Koufax, Holtzman, and Steve Stone, and seventh in ERA (3.78).

== Later life, and death ==
After his playing career, Roberts worked for the Allegany County, Maryland Detention Center, and served as an assistant baseball coach at Potomac State College in West Virginia from 1996 to 1998.

On January 9, 2009, Roberts died of lung cancer that he developed from asbestos exposure as a young man, at his home in Short Gap, West Virginia, at the age of 64. According to his wife, Carol, he was exposed to carcinogenic chemicals while working for several offseasons as a boilermaker. He is buried at Frostburg Memorial Cemetery, not far from Lefty Grove's grave.

== See also ==
- Houston Astros award winners and league leaders
- List of Houston Astros team records
- List of Jewish Major League Baseball players
