= 1987 Houston Astros season =

26th season in Major League Baseball for the Houston Astros

1987 Houston Astros
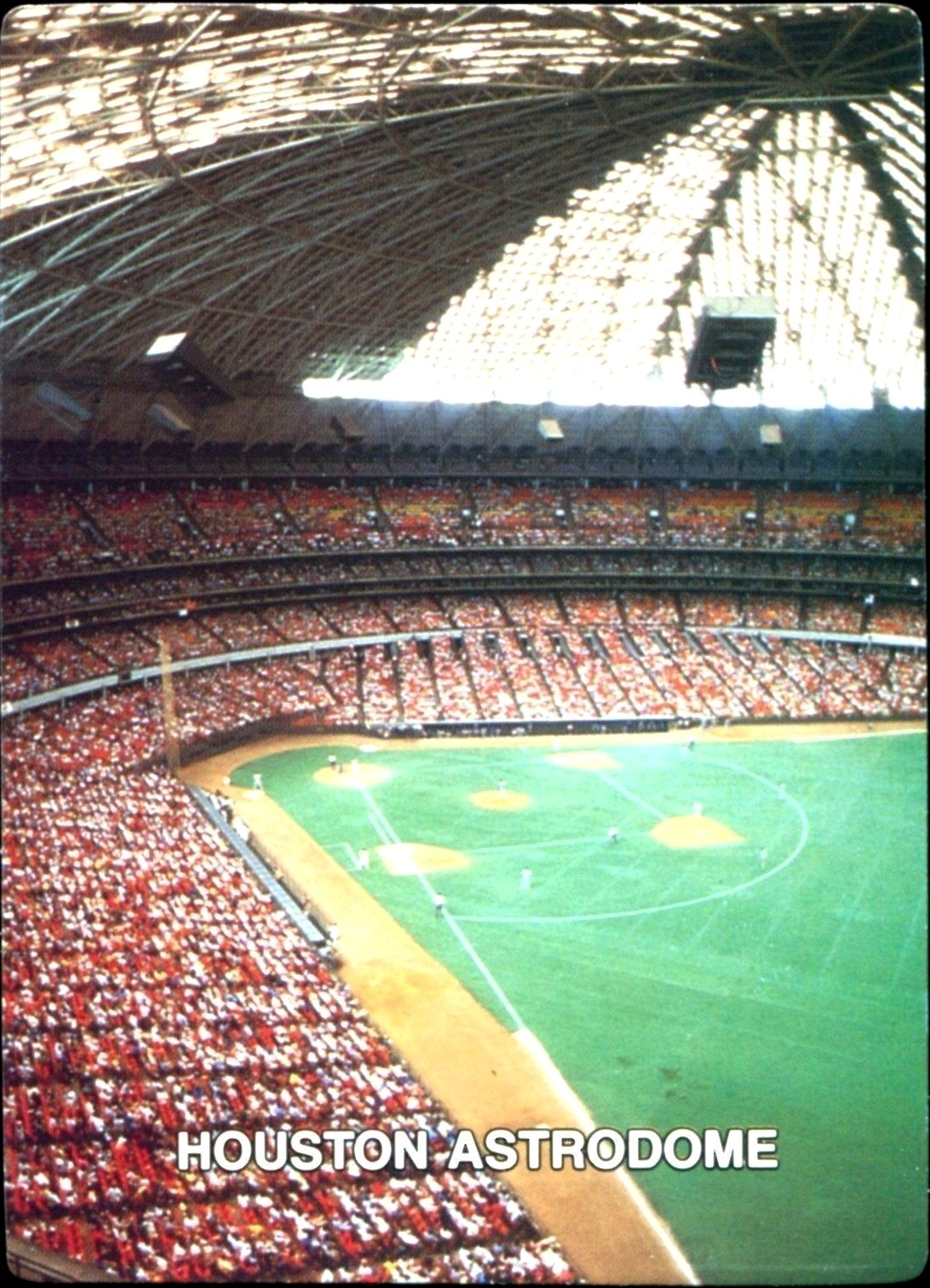
- The Astrodome during a baseball game in 1987.
- League: National League
- Division: West
- Ballpark: The Astrodome
- City: Houston, Texas
- Record: 76–86 (.469)
- Divisional place: 3rd
- Owners: John McMullen
- General managers: Dick Wagner
- Managers: Hal Lanier
- Television: KTXH; HSE
- Radio: KTRH (Bill Brown, Milo Hamilton, Larry Dierker, Dave Hofferth, Bill Worrell); KXYZ (Orlando Sánchez-Diago, Rolando Becerra)

The 1987 Houston Astros season was the 26th season for the Major League Baseball (MLB) franchise located in Houston, Texas, their 23rd as the Astros, 26th in the National League (NL), 19th in the NL West division, and 23rd at the Astrodome, The Astros entered the season as defending NL West division champions with a 96–66 record; however, the season ended with a 4-games-to-2 defeat to the New York Mets in the 1986 National League Championship Series (NLCS).

The season began for Houston on April 6 hosting Los Angeles Dodgers. Pitcher Mike Scott made the first of his five consecutive Opening Day starts for the Astros, who won, 4–3. In the amateur draft, the Astros selected catcher Craig Biggio in the first round, at 22nd overall, and Darryl Kile in the 30th round. On June 27, Kevin Bass became the first player in franchise history to attain four extra-base hits in one game.

Scott represented the Astros at the MLB All-Star Game, his second career selection, where he was the starting pitcher for the National League. On September 9, right-hander Nolan Ryan recorded the 4,500th strikeout of his career.

The Astros concluded the season with a 76–86 record and in third place in the NL West, 14 games behind the division champion San Francisco Giants. Ryan led the major leagues in strikeouts (270), in hits per nine innings pitched (6.5), and the National League in earned run average (2.76 ERA), among other categories. Ryan's ERA and strikeout titles were the second consecutive each won by a Houston pitcher, following Scott in 1986 (2.22 ERA and 303 strikeouts).

== Offseason ==
- October 24, 1986: Matt Keough was released by the Astros.
- October 24, 1986: John Mizerock was released by the Houston Astros.
- November 16, 1986: Rocky Childress was purchased by the Astros from the Philadelphia Phillies.

== Regular season ==
=== Summary ===
==== April ====
Opening Day starting lineup
Uniform	Player	Position
19	Bill Doran	Second baseman
28	Billy Hatcher	Center fielder
25	José Cruz	Left fielder
27	Glenn Davis	First baseman
17	Kevin Bass	Right fielder
14	Alan Ashby	Catcher
12	Craig Reynolds	Shortstop
3	Phil Garner	Third baseman
33	Mike Scott	Pitcher
Venue: Astrodome • Final: Houston 4, Los Angeles 3 Sources:

Left fielder José Cruz made his club-record 11th Opening Day start for the Astros, (Note: Surpassed César Cedeño, who made his 10th Opening Day start in 1981, and remained a franchise record until Craig Biggio made his 12th Opening Day start in 2000.) while right-hander Mike Scott made his first start as the starting pitcher, on April 6. Scott outdueled Dodgers starter Orel Hershiser over seven innings each as Houston won, 4–3. Cruz homered off Hershiser, and Alan Ashby stroked a go-ahead two-run single during the bottom of the sixth to take the lead, 3–2. Scott was victorious in his debut as the Opening Day starter, while Dave Smith closed out a clutch final two frames for the save.

On April 15, Mike Scott furnished his first career one-hit complete game shutout while striking out 10 against Los Angeles, this time at Dodger Stadium. The lone blemish on Scott's performance was Mariano Duncan's single during the third inning. Mike Marshall, who drew a base on balls, was Los Angeles' only other batter who reached base while Scott faced one over the minimum. Billy Hatcher and Glenn Davis each slugged two-run bombs and added doubles to pace Houston's offense. With a game score of 94, Scott assembled this masterpiece just three outings following his no-hitter on September 25, 1986, It was Scott's twelfth career outing yielding double figures in strikeouts. (Note: Mike Scott, for single games, in the regular season, requiring strikeouts ≥ 10, sorted by descending strikeouts.)

==== May ====
On May 1, Nolan Ryan belted a home run off Charlie Puleo of the Atlanta Braves. The second and final blast of his career as a hitter, Ryan hit his first during his Astros debut on April 12, 1980.

On May 2, the Astros surrendered two grand slams in one game for the first time in club history, to the Atlanta Braves.

==== June ====
On June 3, the Astros became the first Major League team to cede two grand slams in a single game twice during the same season, this time to the Chicago Cubs. Houston also hit a grand slam, tying another major league record in which two teams combined to hit three grand slams in one game. The Cubs toppled the Astros, 22–7, scoring in each of the first seven innings. Astros starter Bob Knepper (losing pitcher, 2–6) was battered for nine runs on seven hits in the first inning, during which Brian Dayett hit Chicago's first grand slam of the game. In the sixth, Keith Moreland slugged the Cubs' second grand slam, on the way to a game-high 7 RBI. Cubs catcher Jody Davis scored five times, while second baseman Ryne Sandberg scored four. During the top of the fourth inning, the Astros' Billy Hatcher connected for a grand slam off starter Rick Sutcliffe (8–2).

Closer Dave Smith surrendered his first run of the season on June 18. Smith had opened the campaign with 22 successive outings without having been scored upon, representing a career-best scoreless innings streak of 27. This run proved crucial for the Dodgers, who temporarily assumed the lead, 4–3, in the top of the 10th inning. The Dodger won the contest when Steve Sax singled in two runs in the top of the 11th off losing pitcher Ron Mathis (0–1).

==== Kevin Bass' four extra-base hits ====
On June 27, Kevin Bass became the first player in Astros history to connect for four extra base hits in one game, which were two doubles, one triple, and one home run to overshoot hitting for the cycle (rather, the "cycle plus one"). This effort led a 6–5 win over the San Francisco Giants, while Bass collected four runs batted in (RBI). With the Astros leading 6–2 in the seventh, Bass took his final at bat requiring only the single to hit for the cycle. He laced a line drive to left field for an easy single of Mark Davis to briefly attain the cycle upon reaching first base. However, Bass instinctively kept running for second to land the double, narrowly ahead of the relay throw. Previously, on three occasions, Astros hitters had amalgamized cycles, including César Cedeño (twice—August 2, 1972, and August 9, 1976), and Bob Watson (June 24, 1977).

During the first inning, Bass cranked a two-run double off Kelly Downs to score Denny Walling and Glenn Davis. In the third, Bass tripled but was stranded when Downs whiffed José Cruz and retired Alan Ashby on a grounder to first base. In fifth, Bass homered to drive in Walling and chase Downs as Houston mounted a 6–1 margin.

The Astros withstood two home runs each by Chili Davis and Matt Williams, while the bullpen staved off Padres comeback attempts during the bottom of sixth and eighth innings. Starter Jim Deshaies (8–2) tossed seven sturdy innings with three earned runs, while Larry Andersen got his first save by converting the final two outs.

The next Astros player to swat as many as four extra-base hits during one contest was Jeff Bagwell (Note: Criteria: For single games, playing for HOU, in the regular season, requiring extra base hits ≥ 4, sorted by descending date.)—who tied the major league record with four doubles—on June 14, 1996.

==== July ====
Ryan collected his 1,494th strikeout as a member of the Houston Astros on July 3 to surpass J. R. Richard for the franchise record. In spite of striking out 10 on the day to go with two runs surrendered over seven innings, Ryan (4–9) dropped a 2–1 defeat to the Philadelphia Phillies.

==== MLB All-Star Game ====
Mike Scott, the Astros' Opening Day starter, was also named the NL starter for the All-Star Game, hosted at the Oakland–Alameda County Coliseum. He tossed two scoreless innings, allowed one hit, and retired Terry Kennedy via strikeout. Scott became the second Astros pitcher to start the All-Star Game, following J. R. Richard in the 1980 contest.

Following Scott's effort, the contest remained scoreless, as the first All-Star Game to go scoreless past five innings. It remained so until the top of the 13th when Tim Raines tripled home Ozzie Virgil Jr. and Hubie Brooks.

==== July, post-All-Star break ====
Astros rookies provided the key roles in a July 16 walk-off win over the Philadelphia Phillies, including third baseman Ken Caminiti, who made his major league debut. His defensive prowess immediately electrified the Astrodome crowd. In the first inning, he pegged an off-balance throw to retire Charlie Hayes, and in the second, an acrobatic catch to snag a line drive off the bat of Lance Parrish. At the plate, Caminiti went 2-for-4, including his first major league triple and, in the seventh inning, his first home run, off starter Kevin Gross, deep to center that tied the contest, 1–1. In the top of the ninth, fellow rookie Gerald Young made two dramatic catches in center field to save runs and keep the scored tied. Caminiti drew a base on balls in the bottom of the ninth, and with one out, Young singled to score him as the game-winner and 2–1 win. Astros hitters drew 10 walks while Houston's Danny Darwin (6–6) tossed a four-hit complete game gem, staying through all the way through to become the winning pitcher.

Caminiti earned the NL Player of the Week Award for July 19. During his first four Major League bouts, Caminiti batted .500 / .521 on-base percentage (OBP) / 1.143 slugging percentage (SLG), 7-for-14, homering twice, drew one walk, and did not strike out. Caminiti registered a base hit in eight of his first nine contests, batting .371.

==== August—September ====
On August 3, Kevin Bass became the 16th National Leaguer and third Astro to homer from both sides of the plate. (Note: Succeeded Bobby Bonilla of the Pittsburgh Pirates on July 3, 1987 (NL); and Alan Ashby on September 27, 1982, and Mark Bailey on September 16, 1984 (Astros).)

The Astros aggregated a season-high seven-game winning streak as of August 20, following a four-game sweep of Atlanta and three-game sweep of St. Louis. This brought their overall record on the season to 62–59 (.512), while trailing first place by 1/2 game.

Bill Doran earned NL Player of the Week Award for August 23.

The Astros encountered their longest losing streak of season, also seven games, starting August 25.

On August 31, 1987, Billy Hatcher of the Astros was batting against the Chicago Cubs when his bat broke and pieces flew down the third base line. Cubs third baseman Keith Moreland saw cork, and Hatcher was subsequently suspended for 10 games. He later claimed that he was using reliever Dave Smith's bat, who had allowed him to select one from his bat rack, and not his own.

Kevin Bass connected for his second switch-hit multi-home run game on September 2, becoming the first player in National League history to do so twice during the same season, (Note: In the American League, Mickey Mantle (1955, 1956), and Eddie Murray (1982).) the seventh National League player overall with two or more such games, and first Houston Astro. Moreover, Astros batters had registered four of the seven most recent games. (Note: Lance Berkman became the next Astro to produce switch-hit multi-homer games twice during the same season, on April 13, and July 3, 2006.)

On September 4, Nolan Ryan combined with Juan Agosto to blank the Pittsburgh Pirates, 2–0. Ryan recorded his 210th whiff of the campaign, achieving a record for hurlers aged 40 and older. Bill Doran smashed a two-run single that resulted in the only tallies of the contest.

José Cruz connected for his final home run as a member of the Astros on September 7, off Joe Price of the Giants. The 5–6–7 batters in the order delivered, as Kevin Bass singled in Alan Ashby in the bottom of the sixth to tie the contest, 2–2. Glenn Davis followed with a long ball in the bottom of the seventh, and Cruz led of the eighth with his blast to extend the score to 4–2. That accounted for all the scoring required by Mike Scott (15–10), who earned a complete game, three-hit victory.

==== Nolan Ryan's 4,500th strikeout ====
On September 9, Ryan struck out Mike Aldrete for the 4,500th strikeout in his career. The final out of the seventh inning in a fantastic outing for "The Express," Ryan fanned 16 total that day to lead a 4–2 victory over San Francisco. At the plate, he contributed two hits of his own, including one that drove in the first run of the contest. Building on another dominant season, Ryan ended the day leading the NL in earned run average (2.76 ERA) and strikeouts (226), though his win–loss record stood at 8–15. When asked about further milestones, Ryan predicted that "this old dog" would not reach strikeout number 5,000.

Ryan's performance was the most in the Major Leagues since Roger Clemens's 20 strikeout game on April 29, 1986, (Note: For single games, from 1985 to 1987, in the regular season, requiring strikeouts ≥ 13, sorted by descending strikeouts.) and the third 16+ strikeout performance in franchise annals. Preceding Ryan was Don Wilson, who whiffed a club-record 18 on July, 14, 1968, and another 16 on September 10, 1968. Randy Johnson tossed the next 16-strikeout blitz by an Astro pitcher, on August 28, 1998. Moreover, October 1, 2005, Clemens succeeded Ryan by becoming the second pitcher to attain his 4,500th career strikeout as a member of the Astros.

This was Ryan's fourteenth career performance with 16 or more strikeouts, and his most since June 9, 1979, as a member of the California Angels. This represented his career-high while in Houston..

However, this remained the final date of the season in which the Astros' record was still above .500, going 70–69 (.504). Their performance tumbled at 6–19 (.240) for the remainder of the season.

==== Rest of September ====
Glenn Davis launched three home runs on September 10 at Jack Murphy Stadium; however, in spite of this performance, the San Diego Padres overcame Houston, 8–7. Davis' first two home runs were off Mark Grant, and the final was launched off Mark Davis on his way to five RBI. In the bottom of the ninth, Rob Nelson singled home Garry Templeton off Manny Hernández for the walk-off. This was the first of two occasions that Davis had hit three home runs in a game during his career, and was the third time by an Astros hitter. (Note: Davis was preceded by Lee May on June 21, 1973, while slugging the next three-home run game by an Astro on June 1, 1990.)

On September 15, the Astros turned the fifth triple play in club history, doing so against the Dodgers.

On September 28, Terry Puhl hit his second grand slam inside the Astrodome, to become the fifth player to do so, while succeeding Mark Bailey on August 20, 1985. (Note: This was the first grand slam in the Astrodome for Puhl since May 22, 1982. The next player to record his second grand slam in the Astrodome was Tony Eusebio on June 28, 1995.)

==== Performance overview ====
Houston finished the season with the third-highest attendance total in baseball (1,909,902). Six Astros hitters logged double-figures in home runs to tie a club record by the 1977 squad, which remained until 1993. (Note: Criteria: Number of players that meet criteria in a season, up to 2001, playing for HOU, in the regular season, requiring home runs ≥ 10, sorted by descending instances.)

Nolan Ryan concluded the season having maintained his major league lead in numerous pitching categories, including 270 strikeouts, 6.548 hits per nine innings (H/9), 11.480 strikeouts per nine innings (K/9), 2.47 fielding independent pitching (FIP), and 3.103 strikeout-to-walk ratio (K/BB), He also finished as the National League ERA leader at 2.76, earning the distinction as the first Houston Astro to win two ERA titles. It was the fourth occasion that an Astros pitcher led the NL in ERA, following J. R. Richard (2.71 in 1979), himself (1.69 in 1981), and Mike Scott the year before (2.22). Ryan also joined Richard (303 in 1978 and 313 in 1979) and Scott (306 in 1986) as the third Astros pitcher to lead the NL strikeouts. As league leader in strikeouts and ERA, Ryan contributed the third season in which an Astros pitcher claimed two-thirds of the pitching Triple Crown (Richard in 1979 and Scott in 1986). (Note: Comprising leading the league in each of wins, strikeouts and ERA.)

This was the second season in franchise history that the Astros featured two or more hurlers who registered 200 or more whiffs, and first since 1969. (Note: Number of players that meet criteria in a season for a team, playing for HOU, in the regular season, requiring strikeouts ≥ 200, sorted by descending instances..) Scott concluded the 1987 season as NL runner-up in strikeouts (233), tied for third in wins (16), and seventh with a 3.23 ERA.

Such was the magnitude of Ryan's accomplishment that he became the rare pitcher to lead his league in both ERA and strikeouts while not winning the Cy Young Award during the same season, instead placing fifth in the voting. Ryan joined Richard in 1979 as the second Astro with this distinction. Ryan became the oldest pitcher to the lead the league in strikeouts.

Ryan also led the major leagues in hits per nine innings surrendered (6.548 H/9) for the fourth time in his Astros career, setting a franchise record in this statistic. This was the ninth occasion in club history a Houston pitcher had led the league. Ryan was preceded by Don Wilson, J. R. Richard and Mike Scott..

With 53 stolen bases, Billy Hatcher became the first Astro since César Cedeño (61) in 1977 to pierce the 50-stolen base threshold. Hatcher's was the seventh such season in franchise history (Cedeño produced each of the first six). (Note: For single seasons, playing for HOU, in the regular season, requiring stolen bases ≥ 50, sorted by ascending season.)

Second baseman Bill Doran was voted for Houston Astros' team Most Valuable Player Award (MVP) for the second time, following his selection in 1985. He became the third repeat winner, following Rusty Staub (1966 and 1967), and teammate José Cruz (four times, 1977, 1980, 1983, and 1984).

=== Season standings ===
==== National League West ====
NL West
Team	W	L	Pct.	GB	Home	Road
San Francisco Giants	90	72	.556	—	46‍–‍35	44‍–‍37
Cincinnati Reds	84	78	.519	6	42‍–‍39	42‍–‍39
Houston Astros	76	86	.469	14	47‍–‍34	29‍–‍52
Los Angeles Dodgers	73	89	.451	17	40‍–‍41	33‍–‍48
Atlanta Braves	69	92	.429	20½	42‍–‍39	27‍–‍53
San Diego Padres	65	97	.401	25	37‍–‍44	28‍–‍53

==== Record versus opponents ====
National League

1987 National League record Sources:
Team	ATL	CHC	CIN	HOU	LAD	MON	NYM	PHI	PIT	SD	SF	STL
Atlanta	—	6–5	8–10	8–10	6–12	3–9	7–5	7–5	7–5	6–12	8–10	3–9
Chicago	5–6	—	6–6	8–4	6–6	10–8	9–9	8–10	4–14	9–3	5–7	6–12
Cincinnati	10–8	6–6	—	13–5	10–8	6–6	7–5	5–7	4–8	12–6	7–11	4–8
Houston	10–8	4–8	5–13	—	12–6	7–5	6–6	6–6	6–6	5–13	10–8	5–7
Los Angeles	12–6	6–6	8–10	6–12	—	3–9	6–6	2–10	6–6	11–7	10–8	3–9
Montreal	9–3	8–10	6–6	5–7	9–3	—	8–10	10–8	11–7	9–3	5–7	11–7
New York	5–7	9–9	5–7	6–6	6–6	10–8	—	13–5	12–6	8–4	9–3	9–9
Philadelphia	5–7	10–8	7–5	6–6	10–2	8–10	5–13	—	11–7	8–4	2–10	8–10
Pittsburgh	5–7	14–4	8–4	6–6	6–6	7–11	6–12	7–11	—	8–4	6–6	7–11
San Diego	12–6	3–9	6–12	13–5	7–11	3–9	4–8	4–8	4–8	—	5–13	4–8
San Francisco	10–8	7–5	11–7	8–10	8–10	7–5	3–9	10–2	6–6	13–5	—	7–5
St. Louis	9–3	12–6	8–4	7–5	9–3	7–11	9–9	10–8	11–7	8–4	5–7	—

=== Notable transactions ===
- April 2, 1987: Jeff Calhoun was traded by the Houston Astros to the Philadelphia Phillies for Ronn Reynolds.
- June 2, 1987: Eric Bullock was traded by the Astros to the Minnesota TWins for Clay Christiansen.

=== Roster ===
1987 Houston Astros
Roster
Pitchers: 49 Juan Agosto; 47 Larry Andersen; 50 Rocky Childress; 44 Danny Darwin; 43 Jim Deshaies; 31 Jeff Heathcock; 38 Manny Hernández; 37 Charlie Kerfeld; 39 Bob Knepper; 35 Aurelio López; 56 Rob Mallicoat; 13 Ron Mathis; 53 Dave Meads; 34 Nolan Ryan; 33 Mike Scott; 45 Dave Smith; 52 Julio Solano	Catchers: 9 Troy Afenir; 14 Alan Ashby; 6 Mark Bailey; 30 Ronn Reynolds; 7 Robbie Wine; Infielders: 4 Dale Berra; 3 Buddy Biancalana; 11 Ken Caminiti; 27 Glenn Davis; 19 Bill Doran; 3 Phil Garner; 23 Chuck Jackson; 20 Jim Pankovits; 1 Bert Peña; 12 Craig Reynolds; 10 Dickie Thon; 29 Denny Walling	Outfielders: 17 Kevin Bass; 25 José Cruz; 24 Ty Gainey; 28 Billy Hatcher; 26 Paul Householder; 15 Davey Lopes; 21 Terry Puhl; 30 Ty Waller; 2 Gerald Young	Manager: 22 Hal Lanier; Coaches: 8 Yogi Berra; 48 Matt Galante; 16 Denis Menke; 55 Les Moss; 18 Gene Tenace

== Game log ==
=== Regular season ===
Legend
	Astros win
	Astros loss
	Postponement
	Eliminated from playoff race
**Bold**	Astros team member

1987 regular season game log: 76–86 (Home: 47–34; Away: 29–52)
April: 12–9 (Home: 9–3; Away: 3–6)

#	Date	Time (CT)	Opponent	Score	Win	Loss	Save	Time of Game	Attendance	Record	Box/ Streak

May: 12–15 (Home: 6–7; Away: 6–8)

#	Date	Time (CT)	Opponent	Score	Win	Loss	Save	Time of Game	Attendance	Record	Box/ Streak

June: 16–11 (Home: 9–4; Away: 7–7)

#	Date	Time (CT)	Opponent	Score	Win	Loss	Save	Time of Game	Attendance	Record	Box/ Streak

July: 10–17 (Home: 3–9; Away: 7–8)

#	Date	Time (CT)	Opponent	Score	Win	Loss	Save	Time of Game	Attendance	Record	Box/ Streak
—	July 14	7:30 p.m. CDT	**58th All-Star Game in Oakland, CA**								

August: 15–14 (Home: 11–2; Away: 4–12)

#	Date	Time (CT)	Opponent	Score	Win	Loss	Save	Time of Game	Attendance	Record	Box/ Streak

September: 9–18 (Home: 7–7; Away: 2–11)

#	Date	Time (CT)	Opponent	Score	Win	Loss	Save	Time of Game	Attendance	Record	Box/ Streak

October: 2–2 (Home: 2–2; Away: 0–0)

#	Date	Time (CT)	Opponent	Score	Win	Loss	Save	Time of Game	Attendance	Record	Box/ Streak

=== Detailed records ===
National League
Opponent	W	L	WP	RS	RA
NL East
Div Total
NL West
**Houston Astros**					
Div Total
Season Total

Month	Games	Won	Lost	Win %	RS	RA
April
May
June
July
August
September
October
Total

	Games	Won	Lost	Win %	RS	RA
Home
Away
Total

== Player statistics ==
Table legend
*	Left-handed batter or pitcher	League leader (Bold: MLB leader)
#	Switch hitter	League top ten
	Leader in appearances at position	Team leader

=== Batting ===
==== Starters by position ====
Note: Pos = Position; G = Games played; AB = At bats; H = Hits; Avg. = Batting average; HR = Home runs; RBI = Runs batted in

Pos.	Player	G	AB	H	Avg.	HR	RBI
C	Alan Ashby	125	386	111	.288	14	63
1B	Glenn Davis	151	578	145	.251	27	93
2B	Bill Doran	**162**	625	177	.283	16	79
3B	Denny Walling	110	325	92	.283	5	33
SS	Craig Reynolds	135	374	95	.254	4	28
LF	José Cruz	126	365	88	.241	11	38
CF	Billy Hatcher	141	564	167	.296	11	63
RF	Kevin Bass	157	592	168	.284	19	85

==== Other batters ====
Note: G = Games played; AB = At bats; H = Hits; Avg. = Batting average; HR = Home runs; RBI = Runs batted in

Player	G	AB	H	Avg.	HR	RBI
Gerald Young	71	274	88	.321	1	15
Ken Caminiti	63	203	50	.246	3	23
Terry Puhl	90	122	28	.230	2	15
Phil Garner	43	112	25	.223	3	15
Ronn Reynolds	38	102	17	.167	1	7
Chuck Jackson	35	71	15	.211	1	6
Dickie Thon	32	66	14	.212	1	3
Mark Bailey	35	64	13	.203	0	3
Jim Pankovits	50	61	14	.230	1	8
Bert Peña	21	46	7	.152	0	0
Dale Berra	19	45	8	.178	0	2
Davey Lopes	47	43	10	.233	1	6
Robbie Wine	14	29	3	.103	0	0
Ty Gainey	18	24	3	.125	0	1
Buddy Biancalana	18	24	1	.042	0	0
Troy Afenir	10	20	6	.300	0	1
Paul Householder	14	12	1	.083	0	1
Ty Waller	11	6	1	.167	0	0

=== Pitching ===
==== Starting pitchers ====
Note: G = Games pitched; IP = Innings pitched; W = Wins; L = Losses; ERA = Earned run average; SO = Strikeouts

Player	G	IP	W	L	ERA	SO
Mike Scott	36	247.2	16	13	3.23	233
Nolan Ryan	34	211.2	8	16	2.76	**270**
Danny Darwin	33	195.2	9	10	3.59	134
Bob Knepper	33	177.2	8	17	5.27	76
Jim Deshaies	26	152.0	11	6	4.62	104

==== Other pitchers ====
Note: G = Games pitched; IP = Innings pitched; W = Wins; L = Losses; ERA = Earned run average; SO = Strikeouts

Player	G	IP	W	L	ERA	SO
Manny Hernández	6	21.2	0	4	5.40	12
Rob Mallicoat	4	6.2	0	0	6.75	4

==== Relief pitchers ====
Note: G = Games pitched; W = Wins; L = Losses; SV = Saves; ERA = Earned run average; SO = Strikeouts

Player	G	W	L	SV	ERA	SO
Dave Smith	50	2	3	24	1.65	73
Larry Andersen	67	9	5	5	3.45	94
Dave Meads	45	5	3	0	5.55	32
Rocky Childress	32	1	2	0	2.98	26
Juan Agosto	27	1	1	2	2.63	6
Aurelio López	26	2	1	1	4.50	21
Charlie Kerfeld	21	0	2	0	6.67	17
Jeff Heathcock	19	4	2	1	3.16	15
Julio Solano	11	0	0	0	7.65	12
Ron Mathis	8	0	1	0	5.25	8

== Major League Baseball draft ==
Houston Astros 1987 MLB draft selections
Rd.	Slot	Draftee	Position	School	Origin	Signed	Notes	Bio
1	22	Craig Biggio	Catcher	Seton Hall	(New York (state))	Y	(Note: MLB debut on June 26, 1988, for Houston)	
2	54	Randy Hennis	Right-handed pitcher	UCLA	(California)	Y	(Note: MLB debut on September 17, 1990, for Houston)	
3	80	Dave Henderson	Shortstop	McAlester HS	(Oklahoma)	Y		
4	106	Joe Locke	Right-handed pitcher	Sparkman HS	(Alabama)	Y		
5	132	Harold Allen	Left-handed pitcher	Indiana State	(Indiana)	Y		
6	158	Billy Carver	Catcher	Tennessee	(Tennessee)	Y		
12	314	Andy Mota	Infielder	Cal State Fullerton	(Dominican Republic)	Y	(Note: MLB debut on August 31, 1991, for Houston)	
16	418	Al Osuna	Left-handed pitcher	Stanford • 1987	(California)	Y	(Note: MLB debut on September 2, 1990, for Houston)	
30	782	Darryl Kile	Right-handed pitcher	Chaffey	(California)	Y	(Note: MLB debut on April 8, 1991, for Houston)	
34	884	Scott Erickson	Right-handed pitcher	San Jose City	(California)	N	(Note: Signed with the Minnesota Twins from the 1989 draft.) (Note: MLB debut on June 25, 1990, for Minnesota)	
37	954	Lance Dickson	Left-handed pitcher	Grossmont HS	(California)	N	(Note: Signed with the Chicago Cubs from the 1990 draft.) (Note: MLB debut on August 9, 1990, for Chicago)	

== Awards and achievements ==
=== Grand slams ===
No.	Date	Astros batter	Venue	Inning	Pitcher	Opposing team	Box
1 (Note: One of record-tying three grand slams hit by both teams)	June 3	Billy Hatcher	Wrigley Field	4	Rick Sutcliffe	Chicago Cubs	
2	June 10	Alan Ashby	Astrodome	4 (Note: Tied score or took lead)	Storm Davis	San Diego Padres	
3	September 28	Terry Puhl	Astrodome	5	Orel Hershiser	Los Angeles Dodgers	

=== Awards ===
1987 Houston Astros award winners
Name of award		Recipient	Ref.
Fred Hartman Award for Long and Meritorious Service to Baseball		Gene Elston	
Houston-Area Major League Player of the Year (Note: Premier year for this award.)	BOS	Roger Clemens	
Houston Astros Most Valuable Player (MVP)		Bill Doran	
MLB All-Star Game	Starting pitcher	Mike Scott	
National League (NL) Player of the Week	April 12	José Cruz	
National League (NL) Player of the Week	June 21	Mike Scott	
National League (NL) Player of the Week	July 19	Ken Caminiti	
National League (NL) Player of the Week	August 23	Bill Doran	

Other awards results

Name of award	Voting recipient(s) (Team)	Ref.
NL Cy Young	1st—Bedrosian (PHI) • 5th—Ryan (HOU) • 7th—Scott (HOU)	
NL Most Valuable Player	1st—Dawson (CHC) • 18th—Doran (HOU)	
NL Rookie of the Year	1st—Santiago (SDP) • 5th—Young (HOU)	

=== League leaders ===
==== Batting ====
- Games played: Bill Doran (162)

==== Pitching ====
Sources:

- Earned run average (ERA): Nolan Ryan (2.76)
- Fielding Independent Pitching (FIP): Nolan Ryan (2.47—led MLB)
- Games started: Mike Scott (36)
- Hits per nine innings pitched (H/9): Nolan Ryan (6.5—led MLB)
- Losses: Bob Knepper (17)
- Strikeout-to-walk ratio (K/BB): Nolan Ryan (3.10—led MLB)
- Strikeouts: Nolan Ryan (276—led MLB)
- Strikeouts per nine innings pitched (K/9): Nolan Ryan (11.5—led MLB)

=== Milestones ===
==== Major League debuts ====
Player—Appeared at position

- Ken Caminiti, third baseman
Date and opponent

- July 16 vs PHI
Box

Also:

== Minor league system ==
Level	Team	League	Manager
AAA	Tucson Toros	Pacific Coast League	Bob Didier
AA	Columbus Astros	Southern League	Tom Wiedenbauer
A	Osceola Astros	Florida State League	Ken Bolek
A	Asheville Tourists	South Atlantic League	Keith Bodie
A-Short Season	Auburn Astros	New York–Penn League	Gary Tuck
Rookie	GCL Astros	Gulf Coast League	Julio Linares

== See also ==
- List of Major League Baseball All-Star Game starting pitchers
- List of Major League Baseball annual ERA leaders
- List of Major League Baseball annual strikeout leaders
- List of Major League Baseball career strikeout leaders
- List of Major League Baseball individual streaks
- List of Major League Baseball titles leaders
