= 1985 Houston Astros season =

24th season in Major League Baseball for the Houston Astros

1985 Houston Astros
- League: National League
- Division: West
- Ballpark: The Astrodome
- City: Houston, Texas
- Record: 83–79 (.512)
- Divisional place: 3rd—tied
- Owners: John McMullen
- General managers: Al Rosen; Dick Wagner
- Managers: Bob Lillis
- Television: KTXH; HSE
- Radio: KTRH (Gene Elston, Milo Hamilton, Larry Dierker, Jim Durham, Jerry Trupiano)

The 1985 Houston Astros season was the 24th season for the Major League Baseball (MLB) franchise located in Houston, Texas, their 21st as the Astros, 24th in the National League (NL), 17th in the NL West division, and 21st at the Astrodome. The Astros entered the season as having tied for second place in the NL West with an 80–82 record and 12 games behind the division-champion and NL pennant-winning San Diego Padres.

On April 5, Nolan Ryan made his second Opening Day start for Houston, who hosted the Los Angeles Dodgers and won, 2–1. In the amateur draft, Houston's first round selection was outfielder Cameron Drew at 12th overall. Knuckleball pitcher Joe Niekro earned his 200th win on July 2, and, on July 11, Ryan became the first pitcher to reach 4,000 career strikeouts.

Left fielder José Cruz and Ryan each represented the Astros at the MLB All-Star Game and played for the National League. This was the second career selection for Cruz and seventh for Ryan. Cruz recorded his 2,000th career hit on September 15.

In September, Dick Wagner became the ninth general manager in franchise history, replacing Al Rosen.

The Astros concluded the season with an 83–79 record, tying for third place with San Diego in the NL West, and 12 games behind Los Angeles, the division-winners.

== Offseason ==
- December 3, 1984: Manuel Lee was drafted from the Astros by the Toronto Blue Jays in the 1984 rule 5 draft.

== Regular season ==
=== Summary ===
==== Opening Day ====
Opening Day starting lineup
Uniform	Player	Position
10	Dickie Thon	Shortstop
23	Enos Cabell	First baseman
3	Phil Garner	Third baseman
25	José Cruz	Left fielder
28	Jerry Mumphrey	Center fielder
21	Terry Puhl	Right fielder
14	Alan Ashby	Catcher
19	Bill Doran	Second baseman
34	Nolan Ryan	Pitcher
Venue: Astrodome • Final: Houston 2, Los Angeles 1 Sources:

On April 9, Houston celebrated the 20th anniversary of the Opening of the Astrodome, where they hosted the Los Angeles Dodgers and won, 2–1, in front of a crowd of 42,876. Nolan Ryan made his second Opening Day start for the Astros, opposite Fernando Valenzuela, as both hurlers sought to reestablish dominance. Ryan's full power had been usurped by injury—he was limited to 183 2/3 innings pitched, a 12–11 win–loss record and "only" 197 strikeouts—while Valenzuela slumped to a 12–17 record. The gala featured celebrities, events and guests. Micky Mantle, who hit the first-ever home run at Astrodome during an exhibition game with the New York Yankees on same date in 1965, was honored. Sprinter Carl Lewis tossed the ceremonial first pitch. It also featured the return of shortstop Dickie Thon after almost exactly one year, who had been ominously struck in the temple by a pitch from Mike Torrez, resulting in an orbital fracture and an absence for the remainder of the season.

One "guest" not invited onto the field was Morganna, dubbed "The Kissing Bandit," who leapt over the wall during the first inning and ran to the mound. Upon spotting her, Ryan obliged, taking to one knee with arms opened wide, and reportedly said, "Hurry up, Morganna! The cops are right behind you!" Morganna bent to kiss Ryan on the check, then zipped to Thon and gave him a peck as well, before reaching the Dodgers' dugout, where members of Houston's Finest awaited.

After play resumed, the Dodgers opened the scoring during the top of the second inning. Mike Marshall doubled with one out, and Sid Bream singled him home. Ryan was unstoppable after that, retiring 16 of the next 17 batters faced prior to Frank DiPino taking over for the eighth. During the bottom of the third inning, Thon singled, advanced when Dodgers catcher Mike Scioscia threw wildly in a pickoff attempt, and scored to tie the game 1–1 when Phil Garner singled. The next inning, the Astros took the lead for good. Bill Doran doubled with one out. Ryan then hit a ground ball to second baseman Mariano Duncan, which Duncan misplayed, allowing Doran to race home for the go-ahead tally, 2–1, also the game's final score.

==== May ====
Astros infielder Jim Pankovits posted a career day on May 19, leading a 7–3 win over the St. Louis Cardinals. He collected up four hits, including a home run and two doubles.

Ryan obtained his 200th complete game on May 24, a 6–2 defeat of the Cubs.

On May 29, Pankovits broke 3-all tie by crushing a grand slam in the seventh versus the Pittsburgh Pirates. Starter Nolan Ryan got the win, locking down a 7–3 decision for the Houston Astros. Each Astros starter had at least one hit, save for Terry Puhl. Denny Walling and Phil Garner both doubled. Ryan struck out eight over seven innings.

==== June ====
On June 9, Joe Niekro was the winning pitcher after tossing a two-hit shutout versus the San Francisco Giants. The 138th of his career, Niekro took over the lead in franchise history. In spite of the strong effort against the Giants, he had failed in six previous attempts to secure this win.

Southpaw Bob Knepper led an 8–1 rout of the Giants on June 29, driving in four runs while hurling a four-hit complete game. Knepper (8–4) also homered and struck out seven. Batterymate Mark Bailey also homered (5) and had three hits. Phil Garner tripled, pilfered a base and swatted a sacrifice fly. This was Knepper's fourth home run as an Astro, while tying his career high in runs batted in.

==== July ====
Nolan Ryan surrendered the only walk-off home run of his career on July 1 at Jack Murphy Stadium. Pitching into extra innings for the first time as Astro with a 5–5 score, former Astros catcher Bruce Bochy hit the game-winner in the 10th inning. It was also his first career walk-off home run.

Niekro realized another victory milestone on July 2, earning the 200th overall of his career. Niekro tossed seven innings, and allowed two runs, four walks and six hits, while striking out seven. The final score was Houston 3, San Diego 2.

Kevin Bass launched two solo home runs on July 5 to pace a 4–2 victory over the Montreal Expos. José Cruz drove home the other two runs to establish a new franchise record for runs batted in (783 RBI), later broken by Jeff Bagwell.

==== Nolan Ryan's 4,000th strikeout ====
On July 11, Ryan fanned Danny Heep of the New York Mets in the top of the sixth inning for the 4,000th of his career. Ryan became the first pitcher in major league history to reach this milestone. He struck out 11 Mets in the outing before an Astrodome crowd of 30,921. The Astros won it, 4–3, in 12 innings on Bill Doran's fifth hit of the contest and walk-off single to score Dickie Thon.

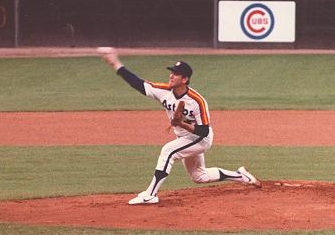
Nolan Ryan, c. 1983, became the first pitcher to reach 4,000 strikeouts.

In the top of the fifth, Ryan froze Darryl Strawberry and Gary Carter on called punchouts for the final two outs of the frame, ticking his total up to 3,999. The moment prompted chants of "Ryan... Ryan... Ryan" from the fans.

In the bottom of the sixth, Bass homered to give Houston a 3–1 advantage. However, in the seventh, the Mets, benefiting from Astros' defensive miscues, parlayed that into two unearned runs, eventually sending the contest into extra innings. Center fielder Ty Gainey made a long sprint for a Lenny Dykstra fly ball only to drop that for a two-base error. Keith Hernandez bounced a grounder to Ryan, but Ryan lost the battle in a rundown with Dykstra, who took third, while Hernandez glided into second on the play. Strawberry then smacked a sacrifice fly and Carter followed with a run-scoring single to tie the contest, 3–3.

In the second inning, Ryan executed his trademark by whiffing Sid Fernandez and Rafael Santana. Carter and Heep followed with singles, and a wild pitch advanced both baserunners, presenting a chance for things to spiral. A bloop double by Howard Johnson plated New York's first run. Dykstra bounded out to second to stay the threat.

Wildness returned for Ryan in the third, who walked the bases loaded via Fernandez, Strawberry and Carter. This time, he found a more expedient escape when Heep grounded into a double play.

In the fourth, Ryan fanned Fernandez for the 3.997th of his career. In the bottom of the frame, Phil Garner singled and Glenn Davis also singled to score Garner and extend a hitting streak to six games.

Dickie Thon batted to a 7-for-14 hike spanning his previous three games. Dave Smith (5–3) tossed the final three innings, all scoreless, to pick up the victory.

In the 12th inning, Thon singled, and advanced on Smith's sacrifice hit. Doran followed with his fifth hit of the game to drive home Thon for a 4–3 Astros walk-off triumph. The five-hit game was the second of Doran's career, and the first by an Astro on the season. With that hit, Doran had collected eight hits in ten at bats.

Ryan's 11 strikeouts represented a season high, putting him 96 ahead of Steve Carlton, who was on the disabled list (DL) at the time due to a rotator cuff strain.

==== Rest of July ====
José Cruz and Nolan Ryan were selected to the MLB All-Star Game as reserves for the National League, which was hosted at the Hubert H. Humphrey Metrodome.

The Astros played to an eventful series against the Mets at Shea Stadium. On July 25, rookie slugger Glenn Davis smashed the only inside-the-park home run of his major league career, off Dwight Gooden in the top of the seventh. Gooden (15–3), in spite of yielding another bomb to catcher Mark Bailey polished off a masterful complete game performance which led New York to a 6–3 win. Errors by Baily and Jerry Mumphrey cost the Astros of a different outcome. Upstart hurler Mike Scott fell to 9–5. He yielded five runs in six innings, with two being earned. Scott's earned run average (ERA) stood at 2.80.

On July 27, the Astros lost to the Mets, 16–4, despite not allowing a single earned run in the game.

On July 31, Mike Scott connected for his first major league home run while batting. The shot was off Tom Browning of the Cincinnati Reds during the top of the fifth inning at Riverfront Stadium. On the mound, the Reds swatted 10 hits off the righty but Scott (10–5) limited the damage to two runs over seven frames to lead a 9–2 Houston victory. Rookie first baseman Glenn Davis paced the offense with his eighth home run of the year and drove in four. Catcher John Mizerock's first double cleared the bases in the top of sixth for Houston.

==== August ====
The Astros romped on the Cardinals on August 20, 17–2, at the Astrodome to the backdrop of a screening of Jaws on the Diamond Vision scoreboard, representing a club-high in runs scored for the season. Catcher Mark Bailey launched a grand slam while Dickie Thon added a triple, home run and 4 RBI to lead the 19-hit charge. Bailey, Glenn Davis and Terry Puhl collected three hits each, while both Bailey and Davis scored four runs. The Astros scored in each of the first six frames. Mike Scott (13–6) surrendered just three hits and two runs to cruise to victory. Bailey's grand slam was his second of the season at the Astrodome, making him the first player to accomplish this feat. He also became just the fourth player to hit two or more grand slams in the Astrodome, succeeding Bob Watson on August 14, 1976. (Note: The next—and only other—player to hit two grand slams at the Astrodome in the same season was Tony Eusebio in 1995.) This was the team's third grand slam at the Astrodome this season, also tying a club record set in 1970.

==== September—October ====
From September 11–19, Houston posted a season-high nine-game winning streak.

José Cruz reached the 2,000 career hits plateau on September 15, to become the first player to do so in Astros' uniform. His 1,702nd safety with Houston, Cruz' first 298 arrived as a member of the St. Louis Cardinals. The milestone hit, a single during the fourth inning off LaMarr Hoyt, drove home Denny Walling to tie the score, 1–1. In the bottom of the eighth, Glenn Davis cranked a tie-breaking home run which provided the margin in a 2–1 Astros triumph over the San Diego Padres. Davis' home run, his 15th, actuated another milestone that broke the club record for home runs by a rookie, set by Joe Morgan in 1965.

Meanwhile, on September 15, in a deal with the New York Yankees, the Astros swapped veteran right-hander Joe Niekro for rookie southpaw Jim Deshaies. A knuckleball specialist, Niekro arrived in Houston in 1975, and won 144 games during his tenure with the Astros. In 1979 and 1980, Niekro became the first Astros hurler to win 20 or more games in two seasons, earning both an All-Star selection, and The Sporting News NL Pitcher of the Year Award, during the former campaign. Upon departing Houston, Niekro ranked either first or second in club history in games pitched, starts, wins, complete games, and shutouts.

On October 5, catcher Alan Ashby slugged his second career grand slam, and first in an Astros uniform. His drive came off Ed Wojna of the Padres in the top of the second to break a scoreless tie and cap a 9–3 Astros win. Each starter except leadoff hitter Bill Doran logged at least one hit, including pitcher Nolan Ryan, with two. José Cruz doubled and homered. Phil Garner had three hits and three runs scored. Ryan (10–12) cruised over 7 innings with seven hits, two runs allowed, and eight strikeouts to earn his 10th win on the penultimate day of the regular season. This was a 15th consecutive season Ryan had attained double-figures in victories.

==== Performance overview ====
The Astros tied a club record set in 1970 by hitting three grand slams at the Astrodome. (Note: Tied again in 1989 and 1995, and surpassed in 1999 when the Astros hit four during the final season of the Astrodome)

First baseman Glenn Davis established a club record for rookies by hitting 20 home runs, doing so over 100 games played. (Note: Surpassed 14 home runs hit by Joe Morgan in 1965. Davis' record stood until Lance Berkman hit 21 home runs during the 2000 season.) Davis led the Astros in home runs though he ranked ninth in total appearances.

=== League standings ===
NL West
Team	W	L	Pct.	GB	Home	Road
Los Angeles Dodgers	95	67	.586	—	48‍–‍33	47‍–‍34
Cincinnati Reds	89	72	.553	5½	47‍–‍34	42‍–‍38
Houston Astros	83	79	.512	12	44‍–‍37	39‍–‍42
San Diego Padres	83	79	.512	12	44‍–‍37	39‍–‍42
Atlanta Braves	66	96	.407	29	32‍–‍49	34‍–‍47
San Francisco Giants	62	100	.383	33	38‍–‍43	24‍–‍57

=== Record versus opponents ===
National League

1985 National League record Sources:
Team	ATL	CHC	CIN	HOU	LAD	MON	NYM	PHI	PIT	SD	SF	STL
Atlanta	—	5–7	7–11	8–10	5–13	3–9	2–10	10–2	6–6	7–11	10–8	3–9
Chicago	7–5	—	5–6	5–7	5–7	7–11	4–14	13–5	13–5	8–4	6–6	4–14
Cincinnati	11–7	6–5	—	11–7	7–11	8–4	4–8	7–5	9–3	9–9	12–6	5–7
Houston	10–8	7–5	7–11	—	6–12	6–6	4–8	4–8	6–6	12–6	15–3	6–6
Los Angeles	13–5	7–5	11–7	12–6	—	7–5	7–5	4–8	8–4	8–10	11–7	7–5
Montreal	9–3	11–7	4–8	6–6	5–7	—	9–9	8–10	9–8	5–7	7–5	11–7
New York	10–2	14–4	8–4	8–4	5–7	9–9	—	11–7	10–8	7–5	8–4	8–10
Philadelphia	2-10	5–13	5–7	8–4	8–4	10–8	7–11	—	11–7	5–7	6–6	8–10
Pittsburgh	6–6	5–13	3–9	6–6	4–8	8–9	8–10	7–11	—	4–8	3–9	3–15
San Diego	11–7	4–8	9–9	6–12	10–8	7–5	5–7	7–5	8–4	—	12–6	4–8
San Francisco	8–10	6–6	6–12	3–15	7–11	5–7	4–8	6–6	9–3	6–12	—	2–10
St. Louis	9–3	14–4	7–5	6–6	5–7	7–11	10–8	10–8	15–3	8–4	10–2	—

=== Notable transactions ===
- May 30, 1985: Signed Tony Eusebio as an international free agent.
- June 3, 1985: Mike Simms was drafted by the Astros in the 6th round of the 1985 Major League Baseball draft.
- June 12, 1985: Brad Gulden was purchased by the Houston Astros from the Cincinnati Reds.
- September 15, 1985: Joe Niekro was traded by the Astros to the New York Yankees for Jim Deshaies and players to be named later. The New York Yankees completed the deal by sending Neder Horta (minors) to the Astros on September 24 and Dody Rather (minors) to the Astros on January 11, 1986.

=== Roster ===
1985 Houston Astros
Roster
Pitchers: 49 Jeff Calhoun; 46 Bill Dawley; 43 Jim Deshaies; 11 Frank DiPino; 31 Jeff Heathcock; 37 Charlie Kerfeld; 39 Bob Knepper; 41 Mark Knudson; 53 Mike Madden; 42 Ron Mathis; 36 Joe Niekro; 47 Mark Ross; 34 Nolan Ryan; 33 Mike Scott; 45 Dave Smith; 52 Julio Solano	Catchers: 14 Alan Ashby; 6 Mark Bailey; 4 John Mizerock; Infielders: 23 Enos Cabell; 27 Glenn Davis; 19 Bill Doran; 3 Phil Garner; 1 Bert Peña; 12 Craig Reynolds; 23 Germán Rivera; 16 Harry Spilman; 10 Dickie Thon; 29 Denny Walling	Outfielders: 17 Kevin Bass; 9 Eric Bullock; 25 José Cruz; 24 Ty Gainey; 22 Chris Jones; 28 Jerry Mumphrey; 20 Jim Pankovits; 21 Terry Puhl; 18 Tim Tolman	Manager: 5 Bob Lillis; Coaches: 2 Cot Deal (Outfield/Defensive Coordinator); 48 Matt Galante; 43 Don Leppert; 15 Denis Menke; 54 Jerry Walker

== Player statistics ==
Table legend
League top ten
Team leader

=== Batting ===
==== Starters by position ====
Note: Pos = Position; G = Games played; AB = At bats; H = Hits; Avg. = Batting average; HR = Home runs; RBI = Runs batted in

Pos	Player	G	AB	H	Avg.	HR	RBI
C	Mark Bailey	114	332	88	.265	10	45
1B	Glenn Davis	100	350	95	.271	20	64
2B	Bill Doran	148	578	166	.287	14	59
SS	Craig Reynolds	107	379	103	.272	4	32
3B	Phil Garner	135	463	124	.268	6	51
LF	José Cruz	141	544	163	.300	9	79
CF	Kevin Bass	150	539	145	.269	16	68
RF	Jerry Mumphrey	130	444	123	.277	8	61

==== Other batters ====
Note: G = Games played; AB = At bats; H = Hits; Avg. = Batting average; HR = Home runs; RBI = Runs batted in

Player	G	AB	H	Avg.	HR	RBI
Denny Walling	119	345	93	.270	7	45
Dickie Thon	84	251	63	.251	6	29
Terry Puhl	57	194	55	.284	2	23
Alan Ashby	65	189	53	.280	8	25
Jim Pankovits	75	172	42	.244	4	14
Enos Cabell	60	143	35	.245	2	14
Harry Spilman	44	66	9	.136	1	4
Tim Tolman	31	43	6	.140	2	8
John Mizerock	15	38	9	.237	0	6
Ty Gainey	13	37	6	.162	0	0
Germán Rivera	13	36	7	.194	0	2
Bert Peña	20	29	8	.276	0	4
Chris Jones	31	25	5	.200	0	1
Eric Bullock	18	25	7	.280	0	2

=== Pitching ===
==== Starting pitchers ====
Note: G = Games pitched; IP = Innings pitched; W = Wins; L = Losses; ERA = Earned run average; SO = Strikeouts

Player	G	IP	W	L	ERA	SO
Bob Knepper	37	241.0	15	13	3.55	131
Nolan Ryan	35	232.0	10	12	3.80	209
Mike Scott	36	221.2	18	8	3.29	137
Joe Niekro	32	213.0	9	12	3.72	117
Mark Knudson	2	11.0	0	2	9.00	4

==== Other pitchers ====
Note: G = Games pitched; IP = Innings pitched; W = Wins; L = Losses; ERA = Earned run average; SO = Strikeouts

Player	G	IP	W	L	ERA	SO
Ron Mathis	23	70.0	3	5	6.04	34
Jeff Heathcock	14	56.1	3	1	3.36	25
Charlie Kerfeld	11	44.1	4	2	4.06	30

==== Relief pitchers ====
Note: G = Games pitched; W = Wins; L = Losses; SV = Saves; ERA = Earned run average; SO = Strikeouts

Player	G	W	L	SV	ERA	SO
Dave Smith	64	9	5	27	2.27	40
Frank DiPino	54	3	7	6	4.03	49
Bill Dawley	49	5	3	2	3.56	48
Jeff Calhoun	44	2	5	4	2.54	47
Julio Solano	20	2	2	0	3.48	17
Mike Madden	13	0	0	0	4.26	16
Mark Ross	8	0	2	1	4.85	3
Jim Deshaies	2	0	0	0	0.00	2

== Awards and achievements ==
=== Grand slams ===
No.	Date	Astros batter	Venue	Inning	Pitcher	Opposing team	Box
1	May 29	Jim Pankovits (Note: 1st MLB grand slam)	Astrodome	7 (Note: Tied score or took lead)	John Candelaria	Pittsburgh Pirates	
2	June 11	Mark Bailey	Astrodome	6	Craig Lefferts	San Diego Padres	
3	August 20	Mark Bailey	Astrodome	3	Ricky Horton	St. Louis Cardinals	
4	October 5	Alan Ashby	Jack Murphy Stadium	2	Ed Wojna	San Diego Padres	

=== Awards ===
1985 Houston Astros award winners
Name of award		Recipient	Ref.
Baseball Digest Rookie All-Star	First baseman	Glenn Davis	
Fred Hartman Long and Meritorious Service to Baseball (Note: Premier year for this award.)		Donald Davidson	
Houston Astros Most Valuable Player (MVP)		Bill Doran	
MLB All-Star Game	Reserve outfielder	José Cruz	
MLB All-Star Game	Reserve pitcher	Nolan Ryan	
Topps All-Star Rookie Team	First baseman	Glenn Davis	

Other awards results

Name of award	Voting recipient(s) (Team)	Ref.
NL Most Valuable Player	1st—McGee (STL) • 21st—Cruz (HOU); Other Astros: 22nd—Doran	
NL Rookie of the Year	1st—Coleman (STL) • 5th—G. Davis (HOU)	

=== League leaders ===
NL pitching leaders

- Wild pitches: Joe Niekro (21—led MLB)

== Minor league system ==
Level	Team	League	Manager
AAA	Tucson Toros	Pacific Coast League	Jimmy Johnson
AA	Columbus Astros	Southern League	Carlos Alfonso
A	Osceola Astros	Florida State League	Dave Cripe
A	Asheville Tourists	South Atlantic League	Fred Hatfield
A-Short Season	Auburn Astros	New York–Penn League	Bob Hartsfield
Rookie	GCL Astros	Gulf Coast League	Julio Linares

== See also ==
- List of Major League Baseball career hits leaders
- List of Major League Baseball career strikeout leaders
- List of Major League Baseball career wins leaders
- List of Major League Baseball individual streaks
- List of Major League Baseball titles leaders
