= 1984 Houston Astros season =

23rd season in Major League Baseball for the Houston Astros

1984 Houston Astros
- League: National League
- Division: West
- Ballpark: The Astrodome
- City: Houston, Texas
- Record: 80–82 (.494)
- Divisional place: 2nd—tied
- Owners: John McMullen
- General managers: Al Rosen
- Managers: Bob Lillis
- Television: KTXH; HSE
- Radio: KRBE (Gene Elston, Dewayne Staats, Larry Dierker, Mike Elliott, Jim Durham, Larry Hirsch)

The 1984 Houston Astros season was the 23rd season for the Major League Baseball (MLB) franchise located in Houston, Texas, their 20th as the Astros, 23rd in the National League (NL), 16th in the NL West, and 20th at The Astrodome. The Astros entered the season having posted an 85–77 record, in third place and 6 games behind the division-champion Los Angeles Dodgers.

On April 3, Joe Niekro made his third Opening Day start for Houston, who hosted the Montreal Expos but lost, 4–2. During the amateur draft, the Astros' first round selection was pitcher Don August, and third round selection was third baseman Ken Caminiti.

Outfielder Jerry Mumphrey was selected to represent the Astros in the MLB All-Star Game and play for the National League, his lone career selection.

The Astros concluded the season with an 80–82 record, tied for second place with the Atlanta Braves and 12 games behind the division-champion and NL pennant-winning San Diego Padres. Following the season, outfielder José Cruz won his second career Silver Slugger Award. Fellow outfielder Terry Puhl was recognized with the Tip O'Neill Award.

== Offseason ==
- February 17, 1984: J. R. Richard was signed as a free agent by the Astros.

== Regular season ==
=== Summary ===
==== April ====
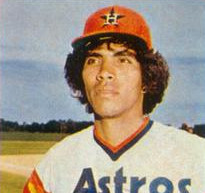
Silver Slugger Award winner José Cruz

Opening Day starting lineup
Uniform	Player	Position
19	Bill Doran	Second baseman
21	Terry Puhl	Right fielder
10	Dickie Thon	Shortstop
25	José Cruz	Left fielder
28	Jerry Mumphrey	Center fielder
22	Ray Knight	First baseman
29	Denny Walling	Third baseman
14	Alan Ashby	Catcher
36	Joe Niekro	Pitcher
Venue: Astrodome • Final: Montreal 4, Houston 2 Sources:

The Astros lost to the Montreal Expos, 4–2, on Opening Day. Charlie Lea outdueled Joe Niekro over seven frames each. During the top of the eighth, Andre Dawson tripled in Tim Raines. Later in the inning, Miguel Diloné scored Gary Carter for a 4–1 Expos lead.

On the Sunday evening of April 8 at the Astrodome, shortstop Dickie Thon was struck near the left eye by a rising fastball from pitcher Mike Torrez, an incident that changed the course of Thon's career. Craig Reynolds pinch ran for Thon, and though the Astros subsequently loaded the bases, Jerry Mumphrey popped out to extinguish the threat. The New York Mets won the contest, 3–1, which clinched a series sweep for New York, their first at the Astrodome since 1966. X-rays revealed a fractured orbital bone and Thon missed the rest of the season due to the injury.

==== May ====
With 39,924 fans in attendance at Shea Stadium on May 6, the second-largest of the season thus far had presented to witness the marquee duel between nineteen-year-old phenom Dwight "Doc" Gooden, and 37-year old Nolan Ryan. In the first inning, Ryan allowed one run on two hits, but then became unstoppable, polishing off the final eight innings yielding just four singles and two walks, while fanning seven. Meanwhile, Gooden started with two scoreless innings, but the Astros pummeled him in the third inning for eight runs on six hits. Ryan chipped in the offensive surge, executing a bunt single over Gooden's head that drove in a run. The Astros defeated the Mets for the second straight contest, 10–1, as Ryan went the distance. Ryan also lined a double to left in the sixth inning and later scored the Astros' ninth run.

On May 22, a pre-game incident took place during warmups when St. Louis Cardinals mascot Fredbird tackled Astros first baseman Enos Cabell, which exacerbated his knee injury. The two clubs exchanged words, but the Astros ultimately walked the game off in the 12th inning.

Riding a five-hit shutout on May 26, Nolan Ryan fanned nine to regain the all-time strikeout lead from Steve Carlton, 3,758 to 3,757. Ryan (6–2) also won his fifth straight decision while having aggregated a scoreless innings streak of 27 as the Astros defeated the Pittsburgh Pirates, 2–0. In the Astros' fifth inning, Bill Doran stroked a tripled to the right field corner off starter José DeLeón (2–2). With one out, Terry Puhl doubled, scoring Doran, and Craig Reynolds followed with single to right, which scored Puhl. The most recent date that Ryan had led Carlton was on July 26, 1983 (3,591—3,588).

Ryan was named NL Player of the Week for May 27. Over two outings—one each against St. Louis (May 21) and Pittsburgh—Ryan launched 14 shutout innings with 16 strikeouts. He issued just four walks and surrendered seven hits.

Ryan accreted a string of 27 2/3 scoreless frames, which represented the best such work during his Astros tenure. (Note: Ryan catapulted his career-longest scoreless innings streak of 34 2/3 as a member of the California Angels from August 18—September 4, 1972.)

Moreover, Ryan assembled just the fifth calendar month in the Major Leagues since 1913 (Note: When earned run became an official statistic.) having surrendered just one earned run over 45 or greater innings pitched, which, at the time, equaled a Major League league record. (Note: Surpassed by Orel Hershiser in September 1988 with a completely scoreless month during his record 59 scoreless innings streak. Criteria: In the regular season, from 1913 to 2025, for any choice in months, requiring earned runs ≤ 1 and innings pitched ≥ 45, sorted by lowest year.)

Following this superb performance, Nolan Ryan was commended as the NL Pitcher of the Month. Nolan Ryan went 5–0 W–L over 6 starts, with a 0.20 earned run average (ERA), over 45 1/3 innings pitched. He surrendered three runs total, 26 hits, and 16 walks, while whiffing 50 batters. Ryan amassed three complete games with two shutouts. Ryan also had been Houston's most recent recipient of the Pitcher of the Month accolade, recognized in August 1982.

==== June ====
During the first inning against the Los Angeles Dodgers on June 1, Mike Scioscia singled in two runs off Nolan Ryan to halt his scoreless streak. Ryan lasted four innings with five hits and the two runs surrendered this time as the Dodgers eventually won, 6–2.

During the month of June, José Cruz hit .303/.333/.443/.776, 37 hits, 24 runs scored, four doubles, five triples, one home run, 29 RBI, and four stolen bases over 30 games. This was the most RBI in a calendar month since Bob Watson produced a club-record 30 RBI in September—October 1977, and the third in team history with 29 or more, previously accomplished by Jimmy Wynn in June 1967. (Note: Criteria: In the regular season, from 1962 to 1986, playing for HOU, for any choice in months, requiring runs batted in ≥ 27, sorted by lowest year.)

==== July ====
For the week of June 25–July 1, José Cruz was named NL Player of the Week, during which he batted .500 (18-for-36), 10 runs scored, 8 runs batted in (RBI) and a stolen base over 8 contests. Five of the games featured three hits, and during the final game that week, July 1, Cruz went 4-for-6, capping an 11-for-19 output over a four-game set versus the Philadelphia Phillies.

José Cruz slugged his 100th home run as a member of the Astros on July 6, off Steve Rogers of the Montreal Expos. It was Cruz' 126th career blast overall. The first run to break a scoreless tie in the top of the fourth, the Astros went on to score 8, winning by 6. Joe Niekro (9–7) went the distance, allowing two runs, and produced a game score of 71.

On July 24, Cabell, Phil Garner, and Cruz each went deep back-to-back-to-back off San Francisco Giants starter Mark Davis to cap a nine-run explosion during the fifth inning. This was the first-ever instance where three Astros hitters homered consecutively. Cruz burnished an exclamation point with another blast off Bob Lacey in the seventh. Garner also doubled during the Astros' 10–3 thrashing. Nolan Ryan (8–6) tossed seven solid frames to earn the quality start and win.

Cruz continued his excellent offensive performance throughout the month of July, and was rewarded as NL Player of the Month. He torched National League pitching for 47 hits, 11 doubles and 22 runs scored for a slash line of .443 / .516 / .632 / 1.148. The first 25 games featured all 47 hits, during which he hit .495, prior to ending the final four games in an 0-for-14 slump.

==== August ====
At Wrigley Field on August 22, José Cruz ripped his third career grand slam in the second inning during which Houston exploded for seven total, on the way to a rout of the Chicago Cubs, 8–3. Earlier in the second inning, Garner had blasted his fourth home run, and also worked two bases on balls during the contest. Craig Reynolds added two hits. Nolan Ryan (11–7) went the distance, surrendering seven hits and two walks while two of the three runs were earned, and tallied 12 punchouts. The victory evened the Astros' record at 64–64.

==== September ====
On September 6, Glenn Davis swatted his first major league home run, launching an offering from Scott Garrelts in the seventh inning at Candlestick Park. This was a solo shot with Houston ahead, 13–1.

Hosting the San Diego Padres on September 16, switch-hitting catcher Mark Bailey became the 13th National Leaguer—on the 19th occasion—and second Houston Astro to homer from both sides of the plate in the same game. (Note: The first was fellow catcher and teammate Alan Ashby, on September 27, 1982, also against the Padres. Kevin Bass had the subsequent achievement on August 3, 1987.) Every score counted as the Astros triumphed in a 10–9 thriller. Bailey connected in the bottom of the second off Mark Thurmond (right side), and in the bottom of the sixth off Luis DeLeón (left). Going into the bottom of the eighth, San Diego led, 9–8. With Glenn Davis at bat and the bases loaded, Rich Gossage uncorked a wild pitch, on which Bill Doran raced home. Next, Davis stroked the game-winning sacrifice fly to plate Kevin Bass. Dave Smith (4–3) then hurled a clean ninth to pick up the victory.

==== Performance overview ====
The Astros concluded the season with an 80–82 record, tied with the Atlanta Braves for second place in the NL West and 12 games behind the division-champion and NL pennant-winning Padres. It was the 10th season since 1969 that the Astros won at least 80 games, and 11th in which they finished two games or fewer below the .500 line. (Note: In 1981, the Astros won 61 of a possible 110 games for a .555 winning percentage.)

As a team, the Astros swatted 67 triples, tying the club record set in 1980. It was the third season within the last four in which they had hit at least 60. (Note: In 1983, the Astros aggregated 60 triples.)

Outfielder José Cruz batted .312 and drove in a career-high 95 runs batted in (RBI). He won his second consecutive Silver Slugger Award to become the first Astro to win more than once.

Terry Puhl, a native of Saskatchewan, was recognized with the inaugural edition of the Tip O'Neill Award, voted to single out the year's best Canadian player in baseball.

Cruz was also honored with an unprecedented fourth Houston Astros' team Most Valuable Player Award (MVP), extending his club record after having won for each of the 1977, 1980, and 1983 campaigns. Cruz also joined Rusty Staub, the previous record-holder, to win in successive campaigns (1966 and 1967).

=== League standings ===
NL West
Team	W	L	Pct.	GB	Home	Road
San Diego Padres	92	70	.568	—	48‍–‍33	44‍–‍37
Atlanta Braves	80	82	.494	12	38‍–‍43	42‍–‍39
Houston Astros	80	82	.494	12	43‍–‍38	37‍–‍44
Los Angeles Dodgers	79	83	.488	13	40‍–‍41	39‍–‍42
Cincinnati Reds	70	92	.432	22	39‍–‍42	31‍–‍50
San Francisco Giants	66	96	.407	26	35‍–‍46	31‍–‍50

==== Record versus opponents ====
National League

1984 National League record Sources:
Team	ATL	CHC	CIN	HOU	LAD	MON	NYM	PHI	PIT	SD	SF	STL
Atlanta	—	3–9	13–5	12–6	6–12	5–7	4–8	7–5	8–4	7–11	10–8	5–7
Chicago	9–3	—	7–5	6–6	7–5	10–7	12–6	9–9	8–10	6–6	9–3	13–5
Cincinnati	5–13	5–7	—	8–10	7–11	7–5	3–9	5–7	7–5	7–11	12–6	4–8
Houston	6–12	6–6	10–8	—	9–9	7–5	4–8	6–6	6–6	6–12	12–6	8–4
Los Angeles	12–6	5–7	7–11	9–9	—	6–6	3–9	3–9	4–8	10–8	10–8	6–6
Montreal	7–5	7–10	5–7	5–7	6–6	—	7–11	11–7	7–11	7–5	7–5	9–9
New York	8–4	6–12	9–3	8–4	9–3	11–7	—	10–8	12–6	6–6	4–8	7–11
Philadelphia	5-7	9–9	7–5	6–6	9–3	7–11	8–10	—	7–11	7–5	8–4	8–10
Pittsburgh	4–8	10–8	5–7	6–6	8–4	11–7	6–12	11–7	—	4–8	6–6	4–14
San Diego	11–7	6–6	11–7	12–6	8–10	5–7	6–6	5–7	8–4	—	13–5	7–5
San Francisco	8–10	3–9	6–12	6–12	8–10	5–7	8–4	4–8	6–6	5–13	—	7–5
St. Louis	7–5	5–13	8–4	4–8	6–6	9–9	11–7	10–8	14–4	5–7	5–7	—

=== Notable transactions ===
- April 27, 1984: J. R. Richard was released by the Astros.
- May 25, 1984: Alan Bannister was traded by the Astros to the Texas Rangers for Mike Richardt.
- June 4, 1984: 1984 Major League Baseball draft:
  - Ken Caminiti was drafted by the Astros in the 3rd round. Player signed June 9, 1984.
  - John Vander Wal was drafted by the Astros in the 8th round, but did not sign.
- July 4, 1984: Scott Loucks was traded by the Astros to the Montreal Expos for Brad Mills.
- August 28, 1984: Ray Knight was traded by the Astros to the New York Mets for players to be named later. The New York Mets completed the trade by sending Gerald Young and Manuel Lee to the Astros on August 31 and Mitch Cook (minors) to the Astros on September 10.

=== Roster ===
1984 Houston Astros
Roster
Pitchers: 49 Jeff Calhoun; 46 Bill Dawley; 11 Frank DiPino; 39 Bob Knepper; 51 Mike LaCoss; 53 Mike Madden; 36 Joe Niekro; 47 Mark Ross; 48 Vern Ruhle; 34 Nolan Ryan; 35 Joe Sambito; 33 Mike Scott; 45 Dave Smith; 52 Julio Solano	Catchers: 14 Alan Ashby; 6 Mark Bailey; 13 Tom Wieghaus; Infielders: 7 Alan Bannister; 23 Enos Cabell; 27 Glenn Davis; 19 Bill Doran; 3 Phil Garner; 22 Ray Knight; 20 Jim Pankovits; 1 Bert Peña; 12 Craig Reynolds; 16 Harry Spilman; 10 Dickie Thon; 29 Denny Walling	Outfielders: 17 Kevin Bass; 25 José Cruz; 28 Jerry Mumphrey; 21 Terry Puhl; 30 Tony Scott; 18 Tim Tolman; Other batters: 30 Mike Richardt	Manager: 5 Bob Lillis; Coaches: 2 Cot Deal (Outfield/Defensive Coordinator); 43 Don Leppert; 15 Denis Menke; 55 Les Moss; 54 Jerry Walker

== Player stats ==
=== Batting ===
==== Starters by position ====
Note: Pos = Position; G = Games played; AB = At bats; H = Hits; Avg. = Batting average; HR = Home runs; RBI = Runs batted in

Pos	Player	G	AB	H	Avg.	HR	RBI
C	Mark Bailey	108	344	73	.212	9	34
1B	Enos Cabell	127	436	135	.310	8	44
2B	Bill Doran	147	548	143	.261	4	41
SS	Craig Reynolds	146	527	137	.260	6	60
3B	Phil Garner	128	374	104	.278	4	45
LF	José Cruz	160	600	187	.312	12	95
CF	Jerry Mumphrey	151	524	152	.290	9	83
RF	Terry Puhl	132	449	135	.301	9	55

==== Other batters ====
Note: G = Games played; AB = At bats; H = Hits; Avg. = Batting average; HR = Home runs; RBI = Runs batted in

Player	G	AB	H	Avg.	HR	RBI
Kevin Bass	121	331	86	.260	2	29
Ray Knight	88	278	62	.223	2	29
Denny Walling	87	249	70	.281	3	31
Alan Ashby	66	191	50	.262	4	27
Jim Pankovits	53	81	23	.284	1	14
Harry Spilman	32	72	19	.264	2	15
Glenn Davis	18	61	13	.213	2	8
Bert Peña	24	39	8	.205	1	4
Tony Scott	25	21	4	.190	0	0
Alan Bannister	9	20	4	.200	0	0
Dickie Thon	5	17	6	.353	0	1
Tim Tolman	14	17	3	.176	0	0
Mike Richardt	16	15	4	.267	0	2
Tom Wieghaus	6	10	0	.000	0	1

=== Pitching ===
==== Starting pitchers ====
Note: G = Games pitched; IP = Innings pitched; W = Wins; L = Losses; ERA = Earned run average; SO = Strikeouts

Player	G	IP	W	L	ERA	SO
Joe Niekro	38	248.1	16	12	3.04	127
Bob Knepper	35	233.2	15	10	3.20	140
Nolan Ryan	30	183.2	12	11	3.04	197
Mike Scott	31	154.0	5	11	4.68	83

==== Other pitchers ====
Note: G = Games pitched; IP = Innings pitched; W = Wins; L = Losses; ERA = Earned run average; SO = Strikeouts

Player	G	IP	W	L	ERA	SO
Mike LaCoss	39	132.0	7	5	4.02	86
Vern Ruhle	40	90.1	1	9	4.58	60
Mike Madden	17	40.2	2	3	5.53	29

==== Relief pitchers ====
Note: G = Games pitched; W = Wins; L = Losses; SV = Saves; ERA = Earned run average; SO = Strikeouts

Player	G	W	L	SV	ERA	SO
Frank DiPino	57	4	9	14	3.35	65
Bill Dawley	60	11	4	5	1.93	47
Dave Smith	53	5	4	5	2.21	45
Joe Sambito	32	0	0	0	3.02	26
Julio Solano	31	1	3	0	1.95	33
Jeff Calhoun	9	0	1	0	1.17	11
Mark Ross	2	1	0	0	0.00	1

== Awards and achievements ==
=== Grand slams ===
No.	Date	Astros batter	Venue	Inning	Pitcher	Opposing team	Box
1	August 22	José Cruz	Wrigley Field	2	Dick Ruthven	Chicago Cubs	
2	September 6	Craig Reynolds	Candlestick Park	1	Bill Laskey	San Francisco Giants	

=== Awards ===
1984 Houston Astros award winners
Name of award		Recipient	Ref.
Houston Astros Most Valuable Player (MVP)		José Cruz	
MLB All-Star Game	Reserve outfielder	Jerry Mumphrey	
National League (NL) Pitcher of the Month	May	Nolan Ryan	
National League (NL) Player of the Month	July	José Cruz	
National League (NL) Player of the Week	May 27	Nolan Ryan	
National League (NL) Player of the Week	July 1	José Cruz	
Silver Slugger Award	Outfielder	José Cruz	
The Sporting News NL All-Star	Outfielder	José Cruz	
Tip O'Neill Award (Note: Premier season for this award.)		Terry Puhl	

Other awards results

Name of award	Voting recipient(s) (Team)	Ref.
NL Manager of the Year	1st—Frey (CHC) • 4th—Lillis (HOU)	
NL Most Valuable Player	1st—Sandberg (CHC) • 8th—Cruz (HOU)	

=== League leaders ===
Batting leaders

- Sacrifice flies: José Cruz (10)
- Sacrifice hits: Craig Reynolds (16)

Pitching leaders

- Games started: Joe Niekro (38)

== Minor league system ==
Level	Team	League	Manager
AAA	Tucson Toros	Pacific Coast League	Matt Galante
AA	Columbus Astros	Southern League	Bob Bailey and Jimmy Johnson
A	Daytona Beach Astros	Florida State League	Dave Cripe
A	Asheville Tourists	South Atlantic League	Tom Spencer
A-Short Season	Auburn Astros	New York–Penn League	Bob Hartsfield
Rookie	GCL Astros	Gulf Coast League	José Tartabull

Championships

- South Atlantic League champions: Asheville

== See also ==
- List of Major League Baseball individual streaks
