= Troy Afenir =

American baseball player (born 1963)

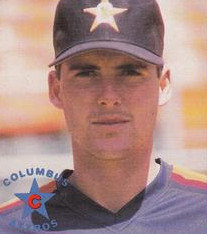
- Afenir in 1988
- Catcher
- Born: September 21, 1963 (age 62); Escondido, California, U.S.
- Batted: Right Threw: Right

MLB debut
- September 14, 1987, for the Houston Astros

Last MLB appearance
- July 10, 1992, for the Cincinnati Reds

MLB statistics
- Batting average: .190
- Hits: 15
- Runs batted in: 7
- Stats at Baseball Reference

Teams
- Houston Astros (1987); Oakland Athletics (1990–1991); Cincinnati Reds (1992)

Michael Troy Afenir (born September 21, 1963) is an American former Major League Baseball catcher. In his major league career, Afenir played for the Houston Astros in 1987, the Oakland Athletics from 1990 to 1991, and the Cincinnati Reds in 1992.

== College and minor league career ==
Drafted by the Houston Astros in the 1st round of the 1983 MLB amateur draft, Afenir made his major league debut with the Houston Astros on September 14, 1987, a win over the Dodgers. Afenir entered the game in the top of the 9th inning as a pinch hitter for catcher Ronn Reynolds and was struck out by Dodgers hurler Brian Holton. Afenir did not play in the major leagues in 1988, batting .247 in 137 games for Houston's Double-A affiliate.

Afenir would remain with the Astros until April 6, 1989, when he was traded to the Oakland Athletics for fellow catcher Matt Sinatro. Afenir spent 1989 in the minor leagues, and returned to the major leagues on July 6, 1990 in the first game of a doubleheader with the Cleveland Indians. THrough the end of the 1990 baseball season, Afenir had struck out 18 times in 34 at bats and had yet to draw a walk.

Afenir would remain with the Athletics through the 1991 season, after which he became a free agent, and signed with the Cincinnati Reds. Afenir would appear in 16 games for the Reds during the 1992 season, and finished his career after 84 minor league games in 1993.

Afenir made only one error in 129 chances for a .992 fielding percentage in limited duty at the major league level. Though he hit .239 with 117 home runs during his ten-year minor league career, he hit .190 with no home runs in 79 major league at bats.

Afenir attended Palomar College, and is one of four alumni to have played in the major leagues.

In 2009, he came back to Palomar's baseball team as an assistant coach. His nephew Ty Afenir also attended Palomar and started at shortstop his freshman year, and later transferred to Division I University of Washington.
