= Francisco Meléndez =

Puerto Rican baseball player (born 1964)

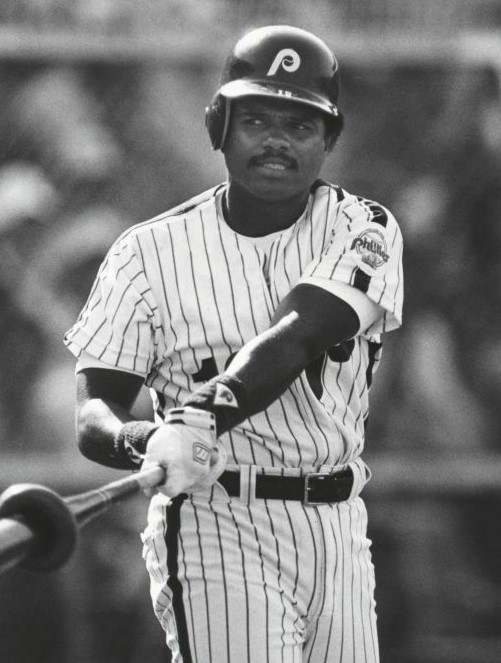
- First baseman
- Born: January 25, 1964 (age 62); Río Piedras, Puerto Rico
- Batted: Left Threw: Left

MLB debut
- August 26, 1984, for the Philadelphia Phillies

Last MLB appearance
- October 1, 1989, for the Baltimore Orioles

MLB statistics
- Batting average: .214
- Home runs: 1
- Runs batted in: 9
- Stats at Baseball Reference

Teams
- Philadelphia Phillies (1984, 1986); San Francisco Giants (1987–1988); Baltimore Orioles (1989)

Francisco Javier Meléndez Villegas (born January 25, 1964) is a Puerto Rican former professional baseball player. A first baseman and outfielder, Melendez played parts of five seasons in the Major League Baseball for the Philadelphia Phillies (1984 and 1986), San Francisco Giants (1987–88), and Baltimore Orioles (1989). After his major league career, he played in the Mexican League from 1991 to 1994.

== See also ==
- List of Major League Baseball players from Puerto Rico
