= José Cruz =

Puerto Rican baseball player (born 1947)

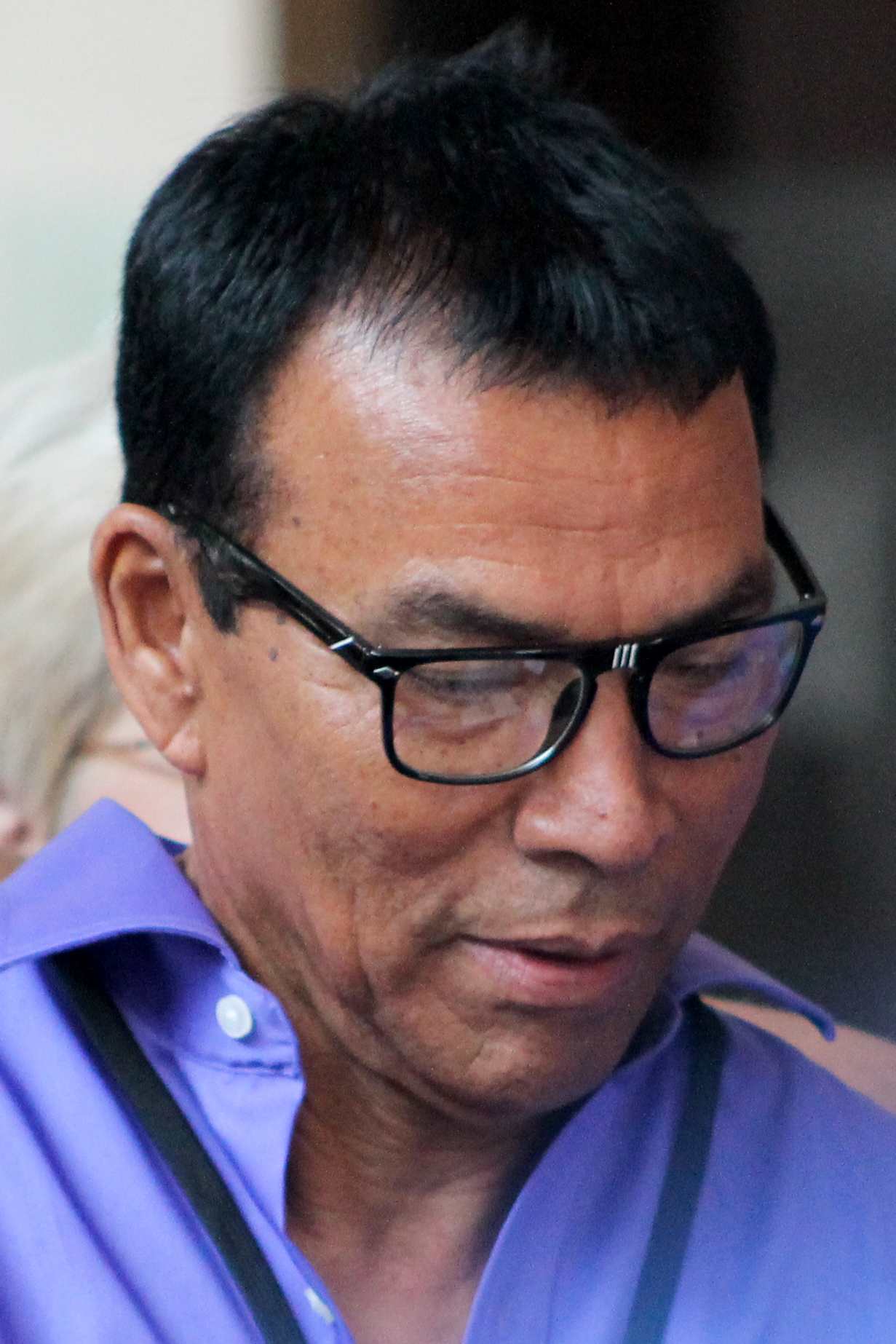
- Cruz in 2014
- Outfielder
- Born: August 8, 1947 (age 79); Arroyo, Puerto Rico
- Batted: Left Threw: Left

MLB debut
- September 19, 1970, for the St. Louis Cardinals

Last MLB appearance
- July 19, 1988, for the New York Yankees

MLB statistics
- Batting average: .284
- Hits: 2,251
- Home runs: 165
- Runs batted in: 1,077
- Stats at Baseball Reference

Teams
- As player: St. Louis Cardinals (1970–1974); Houston Astros (1975–1987); New York Yankees (1988); As coach: Houston Astros (1997–2009)

Career highlights and awards
- 2× All-Star (1980, 1985); 2× Silver Slugger Award (1983, 1984); Houston Astros No. 25 retired; Houston Astros Hall of Fame

José Cruz Dilan (born August 8, 1947), nicknamed "Cheo", is a Puerto Rican former professional baseball player, coach and baseball front office executive. He played in Major League Baseball as an outfielder from 1970 to 1988, most prominently as a member of the Houston Astros.

The left-hand hitting Cruz was one of the most popular players in Houston Astros team history, leading the team to their first-ever division title and postseason berth in 1980. A two-time All-Star, Cruz hit .300 or above for the Astros six times, won two Silver Slugger Awards and led the National League in hits in 1983 while playing his home games in the cavernous, pitcher-friendly Houston Astrodome. He finished in the top ten of the National League Most Valuable Player Award voting three times and won a record four Astros team MVP awards. He was the all-time leader in hits for the Astros (1,937) until being passed by Craig Biggio. Cruz was twice named as the Astros' nominee for the prestigious Roberto Clemente Award for his humanitarian efforts. He also played for the St. Louis Cardinals and the New York Yankees.

After his playing career, Cruz spent several years as the Houston Astros' first base coach and is currently a community outreach executive for the Astros. He is a member of one of Puerto Rico's most famous Major League families and is the brother of former Major Leaguers Héctor Cruz and Tommy Cruz. His son, José Cruz Jr., is also a former Major League outfielder. The Astros honored Cruz's career accomplishments on October 3, 1992 by permanently retiring his jersey number 25. In 2019, Cruz was inducted into the Houston Astros Hall of Fame. Cruz still holds the Astros team record for career triples 35 years after his retirement with 80.

== Playing career ==
=== St. Louis Cardinals ===
1971 photo of Cruz for the St. Louis Cardinals

Cruz signed with the St. Louis Cardinals straight after graduating as a four-sport star at Arroyo High School in 1966. Years of minor league play resulted in him entering the majors as a September call-up in 1970, where he played six games and had six hits. The following year, he was called back up to the Cardinals on June 28, where he would play in 83 of the next 85 games primarily as a center fielder, batting .274 with a .377 on-base percentage (OBP), nine home runs, eighty hits, 49 walks, and 35 strikeouts.

The next year, he was the starting center fielder for the Cardinals on Opening Day. He would play in 117 of 156 games, which included a slump where he batted below .200 the whole month of June. He finished with a .235 average with 23 RBIs and 78 hits (both down from before) while having more strikeouts than walks. The next year, he played in 132 games for the team, where he batted a .227/.310/.379 line with 92 hits and 57 RBIs while also having 66 strikeouts (the most he would have for four seasons) and 51 walks. Each of the three Cruz brothers (all outfielders) played for the Cardinals in 1973. (Note: Héctor appeared in 11 games and Tommy played three.)

The 1974 campaign was Cruz' final with the Cardinals. On July 21, Cruz belted the only inside-the-park home run of his career—and lone home run—against his future club, the Houston Astros. The play scored Bob Forsch, the younger brother of whom Cruz connected against for the home run, Ken.. Cruz played in 107 games, with his .261/.341/.416 (batting average/OBP/slugging percentage) being his second best of four full years with the club. His career took an upswing when he was sold to the Houston Astros on October 24.

=== Houston Astros ===
==== 1975–1979 ====
Cruz debuted for the Astros as the starter in right field on Opening Day in 1975 and proved key in a 5–2 win. During the fifth inning with score tied, 2–2, Cruz blasted a three-run home run to break the tie as he went 3-for-4. In 120 games, he batted .257/.358/.403 while garnering 81 hits, 52 walks and 44 strikeouts (the first of five seasons where his strikeouts weren't higher than his walk count). After the Astros posted an 81–81 record in 1974, the team traded first baseman Lee May to the Baltimore Orioles, which allowed Astros left fielder Bob Watson to move the first base, opening the left field position to Cruz or teammate Greg Gross.

By 1976, Cruz had secured the left field spot (although he would play right field for 1977 and 1978). In a then-career high 496 plate appearances in 1976, Cruz batted over .300 (.303) for the first time, while also accruing new highs in hits (133), RBI (61), stolen bases (28), and walks (53).

Cruz played his first season on a full-time basis in 1977. On August 1, 1977, Cruz blasted his first career walk-off home run to wrap up a 4–3 win over the Pittsburgh Pirates in the bottom of the 11th inning. He again established new career highs in nearly every category, including 661 plate appearances and 173 hits, batting .299. Cruz also produced 31 doubles, 10 triples, 17 home runs, 87 RBI, 44 stolen bases, and a third successive campaign drawing more walks than strikeouts (69 to 67). Hence, Cruz was named the Astros' Most Valuable Player (MVP) for the first time. With the exception of the late Roberto Clemente, Cruz was arguably the most famous baseball player in Puerto Rico during his playing career.

==== 1980 ====
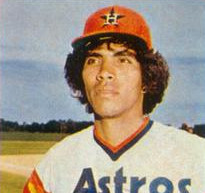
Cruz with the Astros

It was 1980 that proved big for Cruz and the Astros. In 160 games for the team, he would hit .302/.360/.426 while garnering a selection to the 1980 Major League Baseball All-Star Game, the first ever for him. His efforts proved key to the Astros making the postseason for the first time in team history. To get to the postseason, the Astros had to win a tie-breaker game with the Los Angeles Dodgers. In the first inning, he helped to score the first run of the game after hitting a ball that got him to first base on a fielder's choice while scoring the runner on third base.

The National League Championship Series (NLCS) against the Philadelphia Phillies proved a close series (all but Game 1 went to extra innings), and Cruz proved important in numerous games. In Game 2, he broke a 2-2 tie with an eighth inning single to score Joe Morgan. When the Phillies came back to even it, he stepped up in the tenth inning with runners on first and second on one out with a single that was the first of four runs in the inning as the Astros evened up the series. In the do-or-die Game 5, he scored the first run of the game on a two-out double in the first inning. An intentional walk in the seventh with two outs proved important as the Astros scored three runs on two subsequent hits and a wild pitch that scored Cruz. While the Phillies made up for it in the top of the eighth inning to lead 7-5, Cruz and the Astros fought back to tie in the bottom half, as Cruz helped score the tying run on a two-out single. However, the Astros could not hang on for the tenth inning, as Garry Maddox scored in the winning run on a two-out double to seal the fate of the Astros (who had lost the last two games needing just one more win for the pennant). On the whole, Cruz batted .400 with four RBIs, six hits, eight walks, and one strikeout.

==== 1981 ====
Cruz continued some of his success with the following year. In a contest against the Chicago Cubs on May 4, both he and his younger brother, Héctor—the Cubs' third baseman—hit a home run, the first occasion in the Major Leagues since 1974 that two brothers connected for home runs in the same game. (Note: The previous brother combo to homer in the same contest were Graig and Jim Nettles on September 14, 1974.) José's home run drove in three runs, providing the winning margin in a 5–4 Astros' victory. He played in 107 games (out of 110 possible games, owing to the strike) while batting .267/.319/.425 with 109 hits and 55 RBIs while having his second of four straight years with more strikeouts than walks (49 to 35). Despite this, he finished 14th in MVP voting as the Astros found ways to manage the strike-shortened season by winning the second half of the year and advancing to play the first-half winner Los Angeles Dodgers. In the National League Division Series (NLDS), Cruz batted .300 in five games while having six hits and one stolen base, although the Astros would blow a 2-0 series lead by losing the next three on the road.

==== 1982–1987 ====
1982 photocard of Cruz for Houston Astros

On April 26, 1982, Cruz smashed the 100th home run of his career, doing so against St. Louis, his former team. It was a two-run drive off John Martin, to lead a 6–2 Astros' victory.

In 1983, Cruz became the first Astro to pace the league in hits, tying with Andre Dawson for the National League (NL) lead with 189. (Note: The next Astro to lead the league in hits was Jose Altuve in 2014.) Cruz remained in contention for the batting championship, finishing third at .318. He ranked in the top ten in numerous categories, including sixth in on-base percentage (.385), tenth in slugging (.463), seventh in OPS (.848), sixth in total bases (275) and seventh in triples (8). Cruz, along with shortstop Dickie Thon, combined to become Houston's first-ever Silver Slugger Award winners.

In 1984, Cruz continued his successes with the Astros. He connected for his 100th home run as a member of the Astros on July 6, off Steve Rogers of the Montreal Expos. Cruz tallied 160 games once again while batting .312/.381/.462 and having 95 RBIs, 22 stolen bases, and 187 hits. He reversed his troubles with strikeouts, having 73 walks and 68 strikeouts while leading the league in sacrifice hits with ten. He finished eighth in MVP voting while winning his second and last Silver Slugger Award, also becoming the Astros' first repeat winner. Cruz was named player of the month for July, having raised his batting average from .266 to .313 in 29 games played.

On September 15, 1985, Cruz rapped his 2,000 career hit, a game-tying single which plated Denny Walling. Cruz obtained the milestone safety during the bottom of the fourth inning off LaMarr Hoyt of the San Diego Padres. His 1,702nd hit with Houston, he was already the club's all-time leader in the category. (Note: Laterr surpassed by Craig Biggio.) During the bottom of the eighth inning, rookie teammate Glenn Davis cranked a tie-breaking home run which provided the margin in a 2–1 triumph.

The Astros returned to the postseason in 1986. While Cruz would bat in all six games, he only hit .192 with just five hits and two RBIs. The 1987 campaign was his final year with the Astros. He played in 126 games (the lowest in a full season since 1976) while batting .241/.307/.400, including 88 hits and 38 RBIs while walking 36 times and striking out 65 times.

=== New York Yankees ===
Cruz signed with the New York Yankees in 1988. Cruz' final home run—also in his penultimate career appearance—was a pinch-hit grand slam on July 17, 1988, accounting for all of New York's scoring in a 7–4 defeat to the Chicago White Sox. On July 19, 1988, he played his final major league game, going 0-for-4. Cruz appeared in 38 contests for the Yankees before being released on July 22.

=== Achievements ===
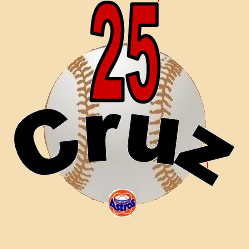
José Cruz's number 25 was retired by the Houston Astros in 1992.

During his playing career, Cruz swatted a total of 165 home runs and 1,077 runs batted in (RBI) to go with a .284 batting average. In 2,353 games played, Cruz was hit by a pitch just seven times, which ranks as the lowest amount for all players with 2,000 games played in MLB history.

Cruz was involved in the Astros' first nine postseason appearances: three as a player (1980, 1981 and 1986) and six as a coach (1997–1999, 2001, 2004–2005). As a player in the postseason, he hit .400 in the five-game series against the Philadelphia Phillies in the 1980 NLCS. Cruz represented the Astros in the MLB All-Star Game in 1980 in Los Angeles and 1985 in Minnesota. He finished third in NL MVP voting in 1980, sixth in 1983, and eighth in 1984. He won the NL Silver Slugger Award as an outfielder in 1983 and 1984. In 1983, Cruz led the NL in hits with 189.

Cruz had played in more games than any other player in the history of the Houston franchise (1,870) before being passed by Craig Biggio in 2001. In 2000, Cruz coached from first base as Biggio surpassed many of his other long-standing franchise records, including at-bats, hits, and total bases. His eighty triples with the Astros remains a franchise record, as does his six career walk-off home runs. (Note: HOU: 110 home runs in 1912-2025 – walk-off) Eight of his career triples were hit with the bases loaded—all with Houston—a National League (NL) record, and tied for the Major League record with Shano Collins in the American League (AL) and Steve Finley (AL/NL, also a former Astro).

== Post-playing career ==
On October 3, 1992, the Astros honored Cruz by retiring his uniform number 25 jointly with former teammate Mike Scott (number 33) during a pre-game ceremony at the Astrodome. In 1999, Cruz was selected by a panel of experts as one of three outfielders on the All-Astrodome team. In 2003, he was inducted into the Texas Baseball Hall of Fame. In 2018, the St. Louis Post-Dispatch determined that of players who spent at least five seasons with the St. Louis Cardinals that Cruz ranked eighteenth in all players in wins above replacement ahead of Hall of Fame players like Ted Simmons, Lou Brock, and Dizzy Dean.

After retiring from baseball, Cruz managed in both the Texas–Louisiana League and the Puerto Rican Winter League before returning as first base coach for the Astros from 1997 to 2009. He moved to the front office as a special assistant to the general manager for five years before being assigned as a Community Outreach Executive. In 2005, he agreed to coach for the team representing Puerto Rico in the 2006 World Baseball Classic, which was managed by José Oquendo, and included his own son, José Cruz, Jr.

Jose Cruz was inducted into the Hispanic Heritage Baseball Museum Hall of Fame on September 13, 2002 in a on-field ceremony (done prior to a game) at Minute Maid Park in Houston. He was inducted into as part of the inaugural class of the Astros Hall of Fame in August 2019.

== Awards ==
- 4× Houston Astros Most Valuable Player (MVP) (1977, 1980, 1983, 1984)
- The Sporting News National League All-Star, Outfield (1984)

== See also ==
- Houston Astros award winners and league leaders
- List of Houston Astros team records
- List of Major League Baseball players from Puerto Rico
- List of Major League Baseball career games played as an outfielder leaders
- List of Major League Baseball career hits leaders
- List of Major League Baseball career putouts as a left fielder leaders
- List of Major League Baseball career runs batted in leaders
- List of Major League Baseball career runs scored leaders
- List of Major League Baseball career stolen bases leaders

== Notes ==
Awards and achievements
Preceded by Al Oliver	National League annual hits leader 1983 (tied with Andre Dawson)	Succeeded by Tony Gwynn
Preceded by Ryne Sandberg	National League Player of the Month; July 1984	Succeeded by Keith Moreland
Sporting positions
Preceded by Bobby Meacham	Houston Astros first base coach 1997—2009	Succeeded by Rick Sweet
