= Dave Meads =

American baseball player (born 1964)

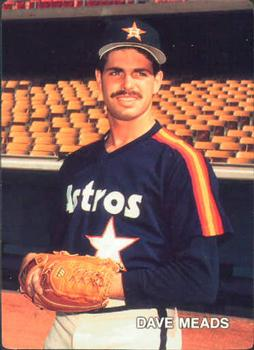
- Meads with the Houston Astros c. 1987
- Pitcher
- Born: January 7, 1964 (age 62); Montclair, New Jersey, U.S.
- Batted: Left Threw: Left

MLB debut
- April 13, 1987, for the Houston Astros

Last MLB appearance
- September 30, 1988, for the Houston Astros

MLB statistics
- Win–loss record: 8–4
- Earned run average: 4.48
- Strikeouts: 59
- Stats at Baseball Reference

Teams
- Houston Astros (1987–1988)

David Donald Meads (born January 7, 1964) is an American former Major League Baseball (MLB) relief pitcher. After attending college and spending time in minor league baseball, he played in two seasons for the Houston Astros.

== Biography ==
=== Early career ===
Meads grew up in Monroe Township, Middlesex County, New Jersey and played baseball at Monroe Township High School, from which he graduated in 1981.

Meads played baseball at Middlesex College and was scouted by Clary Anderson. Meads was inducted into the Middlesex College Athletics Hall of Fame in their inaugural class in 2022. He was drafted by Houston in the sixth round of the 1984 amateur draft. Meads started at the lowest tier with the GCL Astros of the Gulf Coast League in 1984 at age 20 before being promoted to low A ball with the Auburn Astros of the New York–Penn League. In 1986 he rose through A and into AA with the Columbus Astros of the Southern League, registering a 1–1 win–loss record with a 4.43 earned run average (ERA) in 16 games.

=== Major leagues ===
Meads started the 1987 season with the Tucson Toros of the AAA Pacific Coast League. He went 1–0 with a 2.80 ERA in 10 appearances before being called up by Houston in April. Meads made his debut on April 13, 1987, and got his first victory on April 23, striking out Ken Griffey, the only batter he faced. He went 5–3 with a 5.55 ERA in 45 appearances out of the bullpen.

Meads started the 1988 season back with Tucson, but was called up again later in the season and proceeded to go 3–1 with a 3.18 ERA in 22 games pitched. In 1989, while playing with Tucson, he had an arm injury that cut short his career.
