= Ty Gainey =

American baseball player (born 1960)

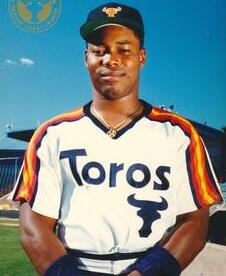
- Gainey with the Tucson Toros c. 1987
- Outfielder
- Born: December 25, 1960 (age 65); Cheraw, South Carolina, U.S.
- Batted: Left Threw: Right

Professional debut
- MLB: April 24, 1985, for the Houston Astros
- NPB: April 10, 1993, for the Orix BlueWave
- CPBL: February 24, 1998, for the Koos Group Whales

Last appearance
- MLB: October 3, 1987, for the Houston Astros
- NPB: September 6, 1994, for the Orix BlueWave
- CPBL: October 22, 1998, for the Koos Group Whales

MLB statistics
- Batting average: .216
- Home runs: 1
- Runs batted in: 7

NPB statistics
- Batting average: .270
- Home runs: 33
- Runs batted in: 99

CPBL statistics
- Batting average: .376
- Home runs: 21
- Runs batted in: 83
- Stats at Baseball Reference

Teams
- Houston Astros (1985–1987); Orix BlueWave (1993–1994); Koos Group Whales (1998)

Telmanch Gainey (born December 25, 1960) is an American former professional baseball outfielder. He played in Major League Baseball (MLB) for the Houston Astros from 1985 to 1987. He also played in Nippon Professional Baseball (NPB) for the Orix BlueWave, and in the Chinese Professional Baseball League (CPBL) for the Koos Group Whales.

After his playing career in Asia, Gainey started giving baseball lessons at the Maplezone Sports Institute in Garnet Valley, Pennsylvania.

== Pro career ==
After being drafted in the second round of the 1979 MLB draft, Gainey was assigned to the Astros Gulf Coast League team. The team featured future Astros star Bill Doran, and Gainey appeared in ten games, and batted .230 in his first year of professional baseball. Gainey would spend the next two seasons bouncing back from rookie league to Single A levels. In 1982, he made it to Double-A, playing for the Columbus Astros, where he played outfield alongside Glenn Davis (who'd later be converted to first base) and Eric Bullock.

Over the course of two seasons at the AA level, Gainey had a respectable batting average, but his strength was his speed, as he stole over 60 bases over the course of those two seasons. By 1985, He'd finally made it to the majors, making his debut on April 24th. However, Gainey seemed overwhelmed by the level of pitching in the majors. With only thirteen games behind him, and a .167 batting average, Gainey was demoted to Triple-A Tucson. Gainey found his grove, and batted a career best .336, but only had ten stolen bases. Gainey spent the next two seasons bouncing from Triple-A to the majors, but continued to struggled at the plate. And during this time, he was passed up by other outfield prospects in the Astros system, Gerald Young and Louie Meadows. Midway through the 1988 season, the Astros finally gave up on Gainey, and he drew his release.

In 1989, he agreed to terms on a minor league deal with the Cleveland Indians, who assigned Gainey to their Triple A team in Colorado Springs. Gainey spent the entire 1989 season in the minors, before splitting the next season playing in the chain of both Cleveland and Pittsburgh. After the Pirates released him, Gainey went to Mexico and finished the season with the Mexico City Reds. After a couple seasons in Mexico, Gainey moved on to Japan, playing for the Orix BlueWave. During this time, Gainey found a power stroke, hitting highs in home runs, but he still had a high strikeout ratio. One of Gainey's teammates on the 1993 BlueWave team was a nineteen year old second year player named Ichiro Suzuki

Over the next several seasons, Gainey split his time between playing in Mexico, returning to the Mexico City Reds, and playing for teams in China. In 2000, after playing for Leones de Yucatan of the Mexican League, Ty Gainey retired from baseball.
