= Jim Deshaies =

American baseball player and analyst (born 1960)

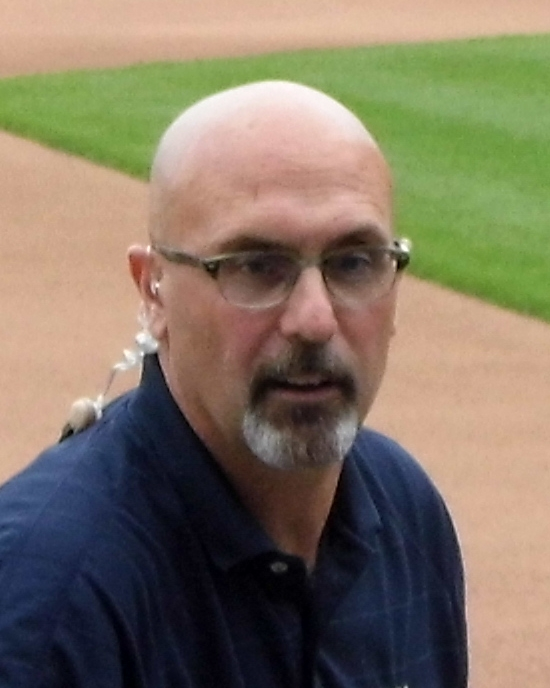
- Deshaies at Wrigley Field in 2013
- Pitcher
- Born: June 23, 1960 (age 66); Massena, New York, U.S.
- Batted: Left Threw: Left

MLB debut
- August 7, 1984, for the New York Yankees

Last MLB appearance
- July 30, 1995, for the Philadelphia Phillies

MLB statistics
- Win–loss record: 84–95
- Earned run average: 4.14
- Strikeouts: 951
- Stats at Baseball Reference

Teams
- New York Yankees (1984); Houston Astros (1985–1991); San Diego Padres (1992); Minnesota Twins (1993); San Francisco Giants (1993); Minnesota Twins (1994); Philadelphia Phillies (1995)

James Joseph Deshaies (born June 23, 1960) is an American former professional baseball left-handed starting pitcher. He played in Major League Baseball (MLB) for six teams over the course of 12 big league seasons. He is currently a color commentator for broadcasts of Chicago Cubs games.

== Playing career ==
Deshaies pitched at Le Moyne College before making his MLB debut with the New York Yankees on August 7, 1984. He was the 1,000th person to play an official game for the Yankees. Deshaies was the losing pitcher that day, after giving up four earned runs in four innings pitched in a 6–3 loss to the Chicago White Sox. Six days later, he lasted three innings in a no decision start against the Cleveland Indians. Those were Deshaies' only appearances for the Yankees, who traded him to the Houston Astros on September 15, 1985, for Joe Niekro.

Deshaies' first full season was with the Astros in 1986, during which he posted 12 wins, an Astros' rookie record, later broken by Roy Oswalt in 2001.

In a September 23, 1986, game against the Los Angeles Dodgers, Deshaies set a Major League record by striking out the first eight batters of the game. This feat was equaled by Jacob deGrom on September 14, 2014, and Germán Márquez on September 26, 2018. The record was later broken by Pablo López of the Miami Marlins on July 11, 2021. Cristian Javier matched a variation of Deshaies' club record on April 22, 2021, by securing the first eight outs of a game via strikeout, while Justin Verlander tied Deshaies' club record for consecutive strikeouts at any point in a game on October 4, 2022.

Deshaies was a mainstay on the Astros' rotation from 1986 to 1991, pitching in 25 or more starts in each of those seasons. His best season was 1989, when he posted a 15–10 record, with a 2.91 earned run average (ERA), and 153 strikeouts. On May 2 that year, Mike Schmidt hit his 548th and final home run off Deshaies.

Deshaies holds the major league record for most at-bats without an extra base hit, with 373.

In 1992, Deshaies joined the San Diego Padres, and later played for the Minnesota Twins (twice), San Francisco Giants, and Philadelphia Phillies. Deshaies retired following his release by the Phillies, on July 31, 1995.

== Broadcasting career ==
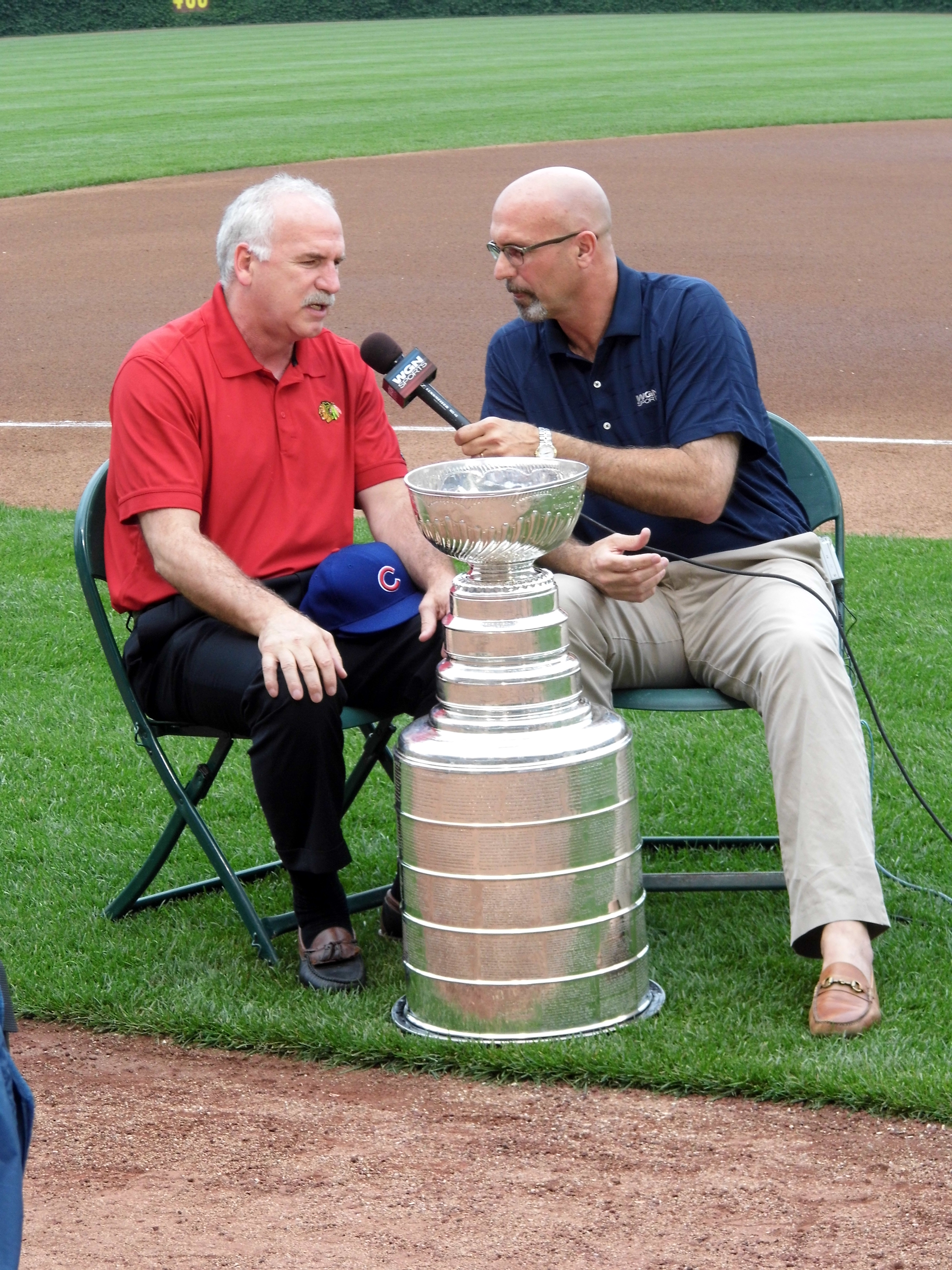
Deshaies interviewing Blackhawks coach Joel Quenneville before a Cubs pregame celebration for the 2013 Stanley Cup champion Blackhawks at Wrigley Field

Deshaies was a commentator for Astros' TV broadcasts from 1997 to 2012, along with Bill Brown. Deshaies gained respect as an analyst and enjoyed very high popularity with Astros fans during his tenure. He was the co-host of the "J.D. and Dave's Excellent Offseason Adventure" during one offseason and occasionally served as an analyst for Fox Major League Baseball.

Deshaies moved to the Chicago Cubs' TV broadcast ahead of the 2013 season. On January 10, 2017, the Cubs announced extensions for both Deshaies and play-by-play man Len Kasper through 2019.

In 2001, Deshaies ran a tongue-in-cheek campaign urging Baseball Writers' Association of America voters to elect him to the Hall of Fame, knowing full well he would not qualify for the honor. Deshaies‘ goal of receiving one vote in the Hall of Fame election was achieved when Houston Chronicle writer John Lopez voted for him. Deshaies remains the Cubs color commentator following the departure of Len Kasper in December 2020.

Preceded by Bob Brenley	Chicago Cubs Television Color Commentator; 2013–present	Incumbent
