= Rob Mallicoat =

American baseball player (1964–2025)

- Pitcher
- Born: November 16, 1964; Saint Helens, Oregon, U.S.
- Died: October 19, 2025 (aged 60)
- Batted: Left Threw: Left

MLB debut
- September 11, 1987, for the Houston Astros

Last MLB appearance
- September 22, 1992, for the Houston Astros

MLB statistics
- Win–loss record: 0–2
- Earned run average: 5.70
- Strikeouts: 42
- Stats at Baseball Reference

Teams
- Houston Astros (1987, 1991–1992)

Robbin Dale Mallicoat (November 16, 1964 – October 19, 2025) was an American Major League Baseball left-handed reliever who played professional baseball from 1985 through 1995. He was drafted by the Detroit Tigers in the 8th round of the 1983 draft (out of high school) and then again between his freshman and sophomore year by the Houston Astros in the first round of the 1984 amateur draft. Mallicoat was 6 ft 3 in (1.91 m) tall and weighed 192 pounds (87 kg). He batted and threw left. Mallicoat was never able to win a game as a Major Leaguer but did pick up one save. It came on August 18, 1991 when Mallicoat pitched the final three innings of a 8–4 Astros win over the Los Angeles Dodgers. He saved the game for starter Mark Portugal.

Mallicoat died from colon cancer on October 19, 2025, at the age of 60.
