= Ronn Reynolds =

American baseball player (born 1958)

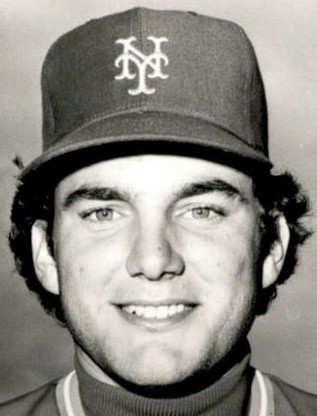
- Catcher
- Born: September 28, 1958 (age 68); Wichita, Kansas, U.S.
- Batted: Right Threw: Right

MLB debut
- September 29, 1982, for the New York Mets

Last MLB appearance
- July 5, 1990, for the San Diego Padres

MLB statistics
- Batting average: .188
- Home runs: 4
- Runs batted in: 21
- Stats at Baseball Reference

Teams
- New York Mets (1982–1983, 1985); Philadelphia Phillies (1986); Houston Astros (1987); San Diego Padres (1990)

Ronn Dwayne Reynolds (born September 28, 1958), is an American former professional baseball catcher, who played in Major League Baseball (MLB) for the New York Mets, Philadelphia Phillies, Houston Astros, and San Diego Padres. He batted and threw right-handed.

== Career ==
After playing college baseball at the University of Arkansas, Reynolds was drafted by the Oakland Athletics in the 5th round in 1979. After not signing with the Athletics, he was again drafted in the 5th round in 1980, this time by the Mets. Reynolds played 51 games for two of the Mets' class-A minor league teams, getting 29 hits in 149 at bats.

In 1981, Reynolds was promoted to the Mets' class-AA team in Jackson. There he played 88 games, getting 272 at-bats and posting a batting average of .235, a slugging percentage of .309 and an on-base percentage of .314. He repeated at Jackson in 1982, improving to a .255 batting average, a .360 slugging percentage and a .344 on-base percentage in 123 games and 431 at-bats.

His 1982 performance earned him a late season promotion to the Mets. He made his major league debut for the Mets on September 29, 1982, against the Chicago Cubs. In total, he played 2 games for the Mets in 1982, going hitless in 4 at-bats.

In 1983, Reynolds split the season between the Mets and their class-AAA affiliate in Tidewater, getting a chance to play in the majors largely due to the injury to the John Stearns. He played with the Mets from April 27 through June 13, playing 24 games and getting 66 at-bats. He posted a .197 batting average, a .280 slugging percentage and a .212 on-base percentage. As a catcher, he allowed 27 stolen bases in 38 attempts. The Mets television and radio announcers often commented in the unusual spelling of his first name (with two n's) when he came to bat that season. During his time with Tidewater, he played 40 games, getting 128 at-bats, posting a .211 batting average, a .273 slugging percentage and a .246 on-base percentage.

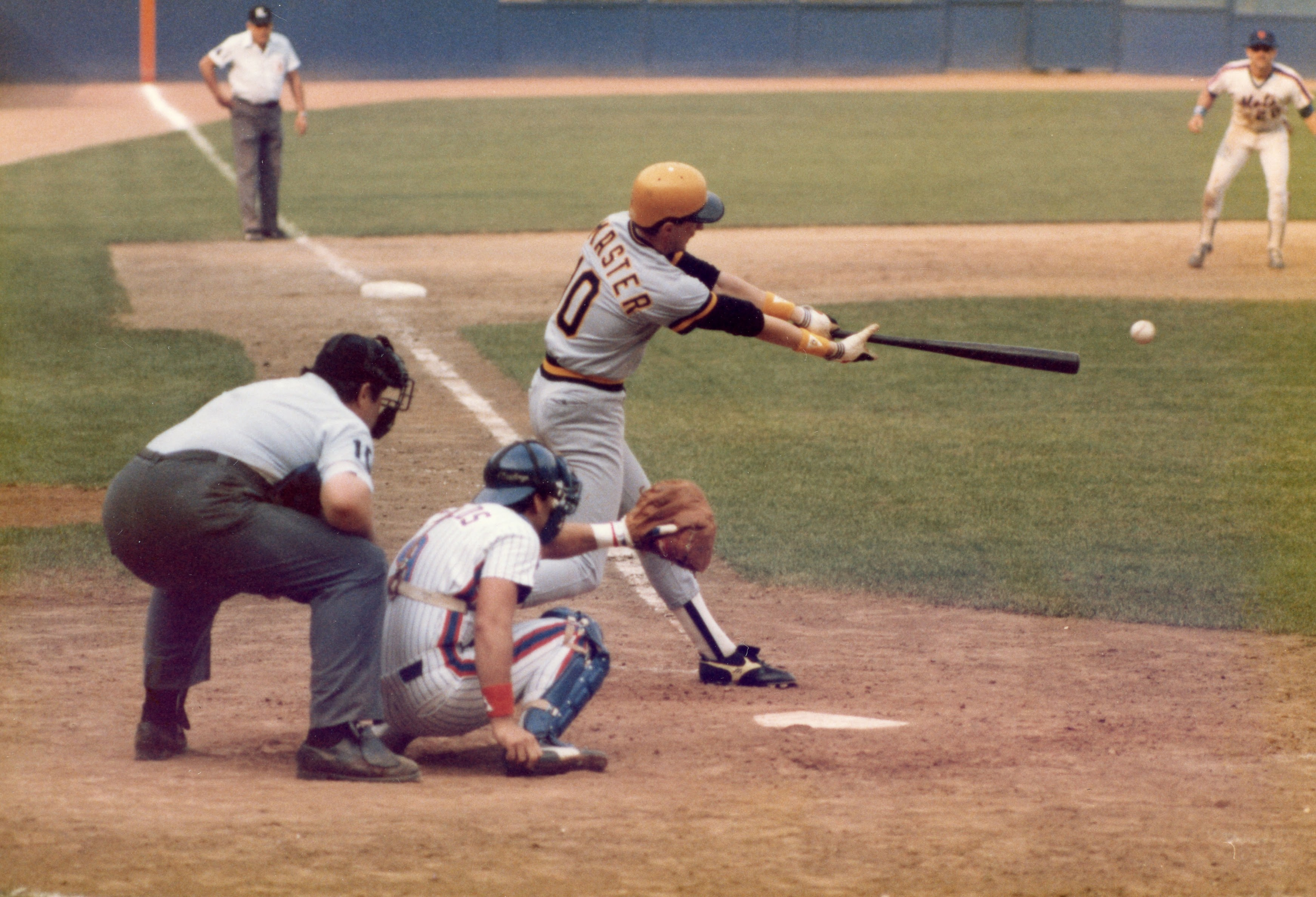
Reynolds catching for the New York Mets during a game at Shea Stadium in 1985

Reynolds spent the entire 1984 season with Tidewater, posting a batting average of .261, a slugging percentage of .418 and an on-base percentage of .303 in 90 games and 280 at bats. His 11 home runs that season were a career high as a professional. Although he started the 1985 season at Tidewater, playing 3 games there, he was promoted to the Mets early in the season to back up Gary Carter. He played 28 games for the Mets, with a batting average of .209, a slugging percentage of .227 and an on-base percentage of .256 in 43 at-bats. He allowed just 10 stolen bases in 19 attempts. In George Plimpton's 1985 April Fools' Day hoax, The Curious Case of Sidd Finch, Reynolds was mentioned as the catcher who painfully caught Sidd Finch's 168 mph fastball.

After the 1985 season, Reynolds was traded to the Philadelphia Phillies along with Jeff Bittiger in exchange for Rodger Cole and Ronnie Gideon, neither of whom ever played a major league game. He split the 1986 season between the Phillies and their class-AAA minor league affiliate in Portland. He played 43 games for the Phillies, with a batting average of .214 (his Major League high), a slugging percentage of .242 and an on-base percentage of .317 in 126 at-bats. He also hit 3 of his 4 lifetime Major League home runs that season. He allowed 46 stolen bases in 59 attempts.

After the 1986 season, he was traded again to the Houston Astros for Jeff Calhoun. He split the 1987 season between the Astros and their class-AAA minor league affiliate in Tucson. He played 38 games for the Astros, with a batting average of .167, a slugging percentage of .189 and an on-base percentage of .235 in 102 at-bats. He allowed 46 stolen bases in 59 attempts. On October 1, Reynolds was the victim of a rare triple-steal versus the Atlanta Braves. With the bases loaded, Reynolds made a return throw to pitcher Danny Darwin and the Braves' Gerald Perry broke from third towards home plate. Darwin threw back to Reynolds but Reynolds dropped the ball and all three runners were safe. Not only were the Braves credited with three stolen bases but Reynolds was injured on the play and left the game.

He was released by the Astros after the 1987 season and signed as a free agent with the Milwaukee Brewers. He never played a game for the Brewers, spending the 1988 and 1989 seasons playing for the Brewers' class AAA affiliate in Denver. His 1989 season was shortened by a pre-season Achilles tendon rupture. He was granted free agency after the 1989 season and signed with the San Diego Padres. He played most of the 1990 season with the Padres class-AAA affiliate in Las Vegas. He did play 8 games for the Padres, getting just one hit (a double) in 15 at-bats. He played his last major league game for the Padres on July 5, 1990.

In all, Reynolds played 143 Major League games in 6 seasons, getting 356 at-bats, 4 home runs, a career batting average of .188, a career slugging percentage of .228 and a career on-base percentage of .256. His minor league totals were 701 games, 2193 at-bats, 49 home runs, a .238 batting average, a .358 slugging percentage and a .309 on-base percentage.
