= Ron Mathis =

American baseball player (born 1958)

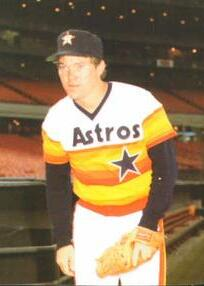
- Mathis with the Houston Astros c. 1985
- Pitcher
- Born: September 25, 1958 (age 67); Kansas City, Missouri, U.S.
- Batted: Right Threw: Right

MLB debut
- April 13, 1985, for the Houston Astros

Last MLB appearance
- July 4, 1987, for the Houston Astros

MLB statistics
- Win–loss record: 3–6
- Earned run average: 5.93
- Strikeouts: 42
- Stats at Baseball Reference

Teams
- Houston Astros (1985, 1987)

Ronald Vance Mathis (born September 25, 1958) is an American former professional baseball player. He was a right-handed pitcher over parts of two seasons (1985, 1987) with the Houston Astros. For his career, he compiled a 3–6 record, with a 5.93 earned run average, and 42 strikeouts in 82 innings pitched.

An alumnus of the University of Missouri, Mathis was born in Kansas City, Missouri.
