= Eric Bullock =

American baseball player (born 1960)

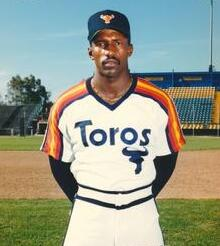
- Bullock with the Tucson Toros c. 1987
- Outfielder
- Born: February 16, 1960 (age 65); Los Angeles, California, U.S.
- Batted: Left Threw: Left

MLB debut
- August 26, 1985, for the Houston Astros

Last MLB appearance
- April 30, 1992, for the Montreal Expos

MLB statistics
- Batting average: .205
- Home runs: 1
- Runs batted in: 12
- Stats at Baseball Reference

Teams
- Houston Astros (1985–1986); Minnesota Twins (1988); Philadelphia Phillies (1989); Montreal Expos (1990–1992)

Eric Gerald Bullock (born February 16, 1960) is an American former professional baseball outfielder, who played in Major League Baseball (MLB) for the Houston Astros, Minnesota Twins, Philadelphia Phillies, and Montreal Expos, from 1985 to 1992.
