= Mark Bailey (baseball) =

American baseball player (1961–2026)

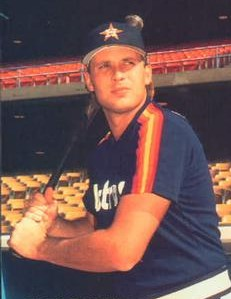
- Bailey in 1987
- Catcher
- Born: November 4, 1961; Springfield, Missouri, U.S.
- Died: May 26, 2026 (aged 64); Katy, Texas, U.S.
- Batted: Switch Threw: Right

MLB debut
- April 27, 1984, for the Houston Astros

Last MLB appearance
- August 22, 1992, for the San Francisco Giants

MLB statistics
- Batting average: .220
- Home runs: 24
- Runs batted in: 101
- Stats at Baseball Reference

Teams
- Houston Astros (1984–1988); San Francisco Giants (1990, 1992)

John Mark "Beetle" Bailey (November 4, 1961 – May 26, 2026) was an American professional baseball player and coach. He played in Major League Baseball as a catcher from 1984 to 1992 for the Houston Astros and San Francisco Giants.

== Amateur career ==
A native of Springfield, Missouri, Bailey graduated from Glendale High School in 1979. He played college basketball and college baseball at Southwest Missouri State University, and was twice named an NCAA Division II All-American infielder. In 1981, he played collegiate summer baseball with the Wareham Gatemen of the Cape Cod Baseball League. In 1982, he helped lead SMS to the NCAA Division II baseball tournament. Bailey was selected by the Astros in the 6th round of the 1982 MLB draft, and opted to forgo his senior year in college to sign professionally.

== Professional career ==
Bailey made his major league debut with Houston in 1984, and was the team's primary catcher in 1984 and 1985. His most productive year at the plate came in 1985, when he hit .265 in 114 games with 10 home runs.

The Astros traded Bailey to the Montreal Expos midway through the 1988 season for Casey Candaele. Bailey spent the remainder of 1988 in the Expos' minor league system and 1989 with the New York Mets' Triple-A Tidewater Tides. After the 1989 season, Bailey signed with the Giants as a free agent, and appeared in a handful of games at the Major League level with San Francisco in 1990 and 1992. Bailey played in the independent Texas-Louisiana League in 1994 and 1995.

In 340 games over seven Major League seasons, Bailey posted a .220 batting average (209-for-949) with 101 runs, 24 home runs, and 101 RBI. While with the Astros, Bailey was behind the plate for 64 of Hall-of-Famer Nolan Ryan starts, the third most of any catcher in Ryan's 27-year career.

== Coaching career ==
Bailey coached at the Single A and Double A in the Astros organization before joining the Houston's staff as the bullpen coach from 2002-09. Bailey then worked as a roving catching instructor for the Astros minor league teams through the 2020 season, capping off 23 seasons coaching with the organization.

== Death ==
Bailey died from cancer in Katy, Texas, on May 26, 2026, at the age of 64.

== Honors ==
Bailey was inducted into the Missouri State Athletics Hall of Fame in 1995, the Springfield Area Sports Hall of Fame in 2016, and the Missouri Sports Hall of Fame in 2017.
