= 1990 San Francisco Giants season =

1990 San Francisco Giants
- League: National League
- Division: West
- Ballpark: Candlestick Park
- City: San Francisco, California
- Owners: Bob Lurie
- General managers: Al Rosen
- Managers: Roger Craig
- Television: KTVU (Duane Kuiper, Ron Fairly, Hank Greenwald); SportsChannel America (Joe Morgan, Duane Kuiper)
- Radio: KNBR (Ron Fairly, Hank Greenwald, Mike Krukow); KLOK (Tito Fuentes, Julio Gonzalez)

The 1990 San Francisco Giants season was the Giants' 108th season in Major League Baseball, their 33rd season in San Francisco since their move from New York following the 1957 season, and their 31st at Candlestick Park. The team finished in third place in the National League West with an 85–77 record, 6 games behind the Cincinnati Reds.

== Offseason ==
- December 3, 1990: Willie McGee was signed as a free agent by the Giants.
- January 19, 1990: Gary Carter was signed as a free agent by the Giants.

== Regular season ==
- In a game against the San Diego Padres, Gary Carter broke the National League record set by Al López for most games caught by a catcher. It was Carter's 1,862nd game as a catcher.

=== Opening Day starters ===
- Kevin Bass
- Brett Butler
- Gary Carter
- Will Clark
- Kevin Mitchell
- Rick Reuschel
- Robby Thompson
- José Uribe
- Matt Williams

=== Season standings ===
NL West
Team	W	L	Pct.	GB	Home	Road
Cincinnati Reds	91	71	.562	—	46‍–‍35	45‍–‍36
Los Angeles Dodgers	86	76	.531	5	47‍–‍34	39‍–‍42
San Francisco Giants	85	77	.525	6	49‍–‍32	36‍–‍45
Houston Astros	75	87	.463	16	49‍–‍32	26‍–‍55
San Diego Padres	75	87	.463	16	37‍–‍44	38‍–‍43
Atlanta Braves	65	97	.401	26	37‍–‍44	28‍–‍53

=== Record vs. opponents ===
1990 National League record Sources:
Team	ATL	CHC	CIN	HOU	LAD	MON	NYM	PHI	PIT	SD	SF	STL
Atlanta	—	6–6	8–10	5–13	6–12	6–6	4–8	5–7	5–7	8–10	5–13	7–5
Chicago	6–6	—	4–8	6–6	3–9	11–7	9–9	11–7	4–14	8–4	7–5	8–10
Cincinnati	10–8	8–4	—	11–7	9–9	9–3	6–6	7–5	6–6	9–9	7–11	9–3
Houston	13–5	6–6	7–11	—	9–9	5–7	5–7	5–7	5–7	4–14	10–8	6–6
Los Angeles	12–6	9–3	9–9	9–9	—	6–6	5–7	8–4	4–8	9–9	8–10	7–5
Montreal	6–6	7–11	3–9	7–5	6–6	—	8–10	10–8	13–5	7–5	7–5	11–7
New York	8–4	9–9	6–6	7–5	7–5	10–8	—	10–8	10–8	5–7	7–5	12–6
Philadelphia	7-5	7–11	5–7	7–5	4–8	8–10	8–10	—	6–12	7–5	8–4	10–8
Pittsburgh	7–5	14–4	6–6	7–5	8–4	5–13	8–10	12–6	—	10–2	8–4	10–8
San Diego	10–8	4–8	9–9	14–4	9–9	5–7	7–5	5–7	2–10	—	7–11	3–9
San Francisco	13–5	5–7	11–7	8–10	10–8	5–7	5–7	4–8	4–8	11–7	—	9–3
St. Louis	5–7	10–8	3–9	6–6	5–7	7–11	6–12	8–10	8–10	9–3	3–9	—

=== Notable transactions ===
- April 5, 1990: Greg Booker was signed as a free agent by the Giants.
- April 8, 1990: Rick Leach was signed as a free agent with the San Francisco Giants.
- June 23, 1990: Ernie Camacho was released by the Giants.
- June 24, 1990: Rick Rodriguez was signed as a free agent by the Giants.
- August 12, 1990: Atlee Hammaker was released by the Giants.

==== Draft picks ====
- June 4, 1990: Rikkert Faneyte was drafted by the San Francisco Giants in the 16th round of the 1990 amateur draft. Player signed March 19, 1991.

=== Major League debuts ===
- Batters:
  - Steve Decker (Sep 18)
  - Mark Leonard (Jul 21)
  - Rick Parker (May 4)
  - Andres Santana (Sep 16)
- Pitchers:
  - Mark Dewey (Aug 24)
  - Eric Gunderson (Apr 11)
  - Paul McClellan (Sep 2)
  - Rafael Novoa (Jul 31)

=== Roster ===
1990 San Francisco Giants
Roster
Pitchers: 40 Steve Bedrosian; 51 Greg Booker; 49 Jeff Brantley; 33 John Burkett; 13 Ernie Camacho; 14 Mark Dewey; 37 Kelly Downs; 50 Scott Garrelts; 53 Eric Gunderson; 14 Atlee Hammaker; 39 Bob Knepper; 29 Mike LaCoss; 36 Randy McCament; 28 Paul McClellan; 26 Andy McGaffigan; 36 Rafael Novoa; 55 Randy O'Neal; 45 Francisco Oliveras; 47 Dan Quisenberry; 48 Rick Reuschel; 31 Don Robinson; 59 Rick Rodriguez; 59 Russ Swan; 30 Mark Thurmond; 28 Ed Vosberg; 46 Trevor Wilson	Catchers: 45 Mark Bailey; 18 Bill Bathe; 8 Gary Carter; 47 Steve Decker; 16 Terry Kennedy; 19 Kirt Manwaring; Infielders: 10 Dave Anderson; 51 Mike Benjamin; 22 Will Clark; 39 Mike Laga; 28 Tony Perezchica; 1 Ernest Riles; 35 Andres Santana; 6 Robby Thompson; 23 José Uribe; 9 Matt Williams	Outfielders: 17 Kevin Bass; 2 Brett Butler; 26 Mike Kingery; 32 Brad Komminsk; 25 Rick Leach; 21 Mark Leonard; 15 Greg Litton; 7 Kevin Mitchell; 32 Rick Parker	Manager: 38 Roger Craig; Coaches: 12 Dusty Baker (hitting); 42 Bill Fahey (third base); 20 Wendell Kim (first base); 5 Bob Lillis (bench); 34 Norm Sherry (pitching)

== Player stats ==
=== Batting ===
==== Starters by position ====
Note: Pos = Position; G = Games played; AB = At bats; H = Hits; Avg. = Batting average; HR = Home runs; RBI = Runs batted in

Pos	Player	G	AB	H	Avg.	HR	RBI
C	Terry Kennedy	107	303	84	.277	2	26
1B	Will Clark	154	600	177	.295	19	95
2B	Robby Thompson	144	498	122	.245	15	56
SS	José Uribe	138	415	103	.248	1	24
3B	Matt Williams	159	617	171	.277	33	122
LF	Kevin Mitchell	140	524	152	.290	35	93
CF	Brett Butler	160	622	192	.309	3	44
RF	Kevin Bass	61	214	54	.252	7	32

==== Other batters ====
Note; G = Games played; AB = At bats; H = Hits; Avg.= Batting average; HR = Home runs; RBI = Runs batted in

Player	G	AB	H	Avg.	HR	RBI
Gary Carter	92	244	62	.254	9	27
Mike Kingery	105	207	61	.295	0	24
Greg Litton	93	204	50	.245	1	24
Rick Leach	78	174	51	.293	2	16
Ernie Riles	92	155	31	.200	8	21
Rick Parker	54	107	26	.243	2	14
Dave Anderson	60	100	35	.350	1	6
Mike Benjamin	22	56	12	.214	2	3
Steve Decker	15	54	16	.296	3	8
Bill Bathe	52	48	11	.229	3	12
Mike Laga	23	27	5	.185	2	4
Mark Leonard	11	17	3	.176	1	2
Kirt Manwaring	8	13	2	.154	0	1
Mark Bailey	5	7	1	.143	1	3
Brad Komminsk	8	5	1	.200	0	0
Tony Perezchica	4	3	1	.333	0	0
Andrés Santana	6	2	0	.000	0	1

=== Pitching ===
==== Starting pitchers ====
Note; G = Games pitched; IP = Innings pitched; W =Wins; L = Losses; ERA = Earned run average; SO = Strikeouts

Player	G	IP	W	L	ERA	SO
John Burkett	33	204.0	14	7	3.79	118
Scott Garrelts	31	182.0	12	11	4.15	80
Don Robinson	26	157.2	10	7	4.57	78
Rick Reuschel	15	87.0	3	6	3.93	49
Mike LaCoss	13	77.2	6	4	3.94	39

==== Other pitchers ====
Note; G = Games pitched; IP = Innings pitched; W = Wins; L = Losses; ERA = Earned run average; SO = Strikeouts

Player	G	IP	W	L	ERA	SO
Trevor Wilson	27	110.1	8	7	4.00	66
Atlee Hammaker	25	67.1	4	5	4.28	28
Kelly Downs	13	63.0	3	2	3.43	31
Bob Knepper	12	44.1	3	3	5.68	24
Eric Gunderson	7	19.2	1	2	5.49	14
Rafael Novoa	7	18.2	0	1	6.75	14
Paul McClellan	4	7.2	0	1	11.74	2
Russ Swan	2	2.1	0	1	3.86	1

==== Relief pitchers ====
Note; G = Games pitched; W = Wins; L = Losses; SV = Saves; ERA = Earned run average; SO = Strikeouts

Player	G	W	L	SV	ERA	SO
Jeff Brantley	55	5	3	19	1.56	61
Steve Bedrosian	68	9	9	17	4.20	43
Mark Thurmond	43	2	3	4	3.34	24
Francisco Oliveras	33	2	2	2	2.77	41
Randy O'Neal	26	1	0	0	3.83	30
Ed Vosberg	18	1	1	0	5.55	12
Mark Dewey	14	1	1	0	2.78	11
Ernie Camacho	8	0	0	0	3.60	8
Dan Quisenberry	5	0	1	0	13.50	2
Andy McGaffigan	4	0	0	0	17.36	4
Randy McCament	3	0	0	0	3.00	5
Rick Rodriguez	3	0	0	0	8.10	2
Greg Booker	2	0	0	0	13.50	0

== Award winners ==
- Steve Bedrosian P, Willie Mac Award
- Will Clark, National League Leader, Sacrifice Flies (13)

All-Star Game

- Kevin Mitchell, Matt Williams

== Farm system ==
Level	Team	League	Manager
AAA	Phoenix Firebirds	Pacific Coast League	Duane Espy
AA	Shreveport Captains	Texas League	Bill Evers
A	San Jose Giants	California League	Tom Spencer
A	Clinton Giants	Midwest League	Jack Mull
A-Short Season	Everett Giants	Northwest League	Deron McCue

LEAGUE CHAMPIONS: Shreveport
