= 1989 San Francisco Giants season =

Major League Baseball season

1989 San Francisco Giants
- National League champions National League West champions
- League: National League
- Division: West
- Ballpark: Candlestick Park
- City: San Francisco
- Owners: Bob Lurie
- General managers: Al Rosen
- Managers: Roger Craig
- Television: KTVU (Duane Kuiper, Steve Physioc, Hank Greenwald); GiantsVision (Joe Morgan, Duane Kuiper)
- Radio: KNBR (Ron Fairly, Hank Greenwald); KLOK (Tito Fuentes, Julio Gonzalez)

The 1989 San Francisco Giants season was the Giants' 107th season in Major League Baseball, their 32nd season in San Francisco since their move from New York following the 1957 season, and their 30th at Candlestick Park. The Giants finished in first place in the National League West with a record of 92 wins and 70 losses. It was their second division title in three years. The Giants defeated the Chicago Cubs in five games in the NLCS. However, they were swept by their cross-Bay rivals, the Oakland Athletics, in an earthquake-marred World Series.

== Offseason ==
- December 8, 1988: Mike Aldrete was traded by the San Francisco Giants to the Montreal Expos for Tracy Jones.
- February 27, 1989: Ernie Camacho was signed as a free agent with the San Francisco Giants.

== Regular season ==
=== Opening Day Lineup ===
Opening Day Starters
#	Name	Position
2	Brett Butler	CF
6	Robby Thompson	2B
22	Will Clark	1B
7	Kevin Mitchell	LF
21	Candy Maldonado	RF
16	Terry Kennedy	C
9	Matt Williams	3B
23	Jose Uribe	SS
48	Rick Reuschel	P

=== Season standings ===
NL West
Team	W	L	Pct.	GB	Home	Road
San Francisco Giants	92	70	.568	—	53‍–‍28	39‍–‍42
San Diego Padres	89	73	.549	3	46‍–‍35	43‍–‍38
Houston Astros	86	76	.531	6	47‍–‍35	39‍–‍41
Los Angeles Dodgers	77	83	.481	14	44‍–‍37	33‍–‍46
Cincinnati Reds	75	87	.463	17	38‍–‍43	37‍–‍44
Atlanta Braves	63	97	.394	28	33‍–‍46	30‍–‍51

=== Record vs. opponents ===
1989 National League record Sources:
Team	ATL	CHC	CIN	HOU	LAD	MON	NYM	PHI	PIT	SD	SF	STL
Atlanta	—	5–7	8–10	8–10	6–10	6–6	2–10	8–4	4–8	7–11	6–12	3–9
Chicago	7–5	—	7–5	5–7	7–5	10–8	10–8	10–8	12–6	8–4	6–6	11–7
Cincinnati	10–8	5–7	—	8–10	8–10	4–8	4–8	4–8	7–5	9–9	8–10	8–4
Houston	10–8	7–5	10–8	—	10–8	4–8	6–6	9–3	7–5	8–10	8–10	7–5
Los Angeles	10–6	5–7	10–8	8–10	—	7–5	5–7	6–6	7–5	6–12	10–8	3–9
Montreal	6–6	8–10	8–4	8–4	5–7	—	9–9	9–9	11–7	5–7	7–5	5–13
New York	10–2	8–10	8–4	6–6	7–5	9–9	—	12–6	9–9	5–7	3–9	10–8
Philadelphia	4–8	8–10	8–4	3–9	6–6	9–9	6–12	—	10–8	2–10	4–8	7–11
Pittsburgh	8–4	6–12	5–7	5–7	5–7	7–11	9–9	8–10	—	3–9	5–7	13–5
San Diego	11–7	4–8	9–9	10–8	12–6	7–5	7–5	10–2	9–3	—	8–10	2–10
San Francisco	12–6	6–6	10–8	10–8	8–10	5–7	9–3	8–4	7–5	10–8	—	7–5
St. Louis	9–3	7–11	4–8	5–7	9–3	13–5	8–10	11–7	5–13	10–2	5–7	—

=== Notable transactions ===
- April 14, 1989: Goose Gossage was signed as a free agent with the San Francisco Giants.
- June 5, 1989: Clay Bellinger was drafted by the San Francisco Giants in the 2nd round of the 1989 amateur draft. Player signed June 8, 1989.
- June 16, 1989: Tracy Jones was traded by the San Francisco Giants to the Detroit Tigers for Pat Sheridan.
- June 18, 1989: Charlie Hayes was traded by the San Francisco Giants with Dennis Cook and Terry Mulholland to the Philadelphia Phillies for a player to be named later and Steve Bedrosian. The Philadelphia Phillies sent Rick Parker (August 7, 1989) to the San Francisco Giants to complete the trade.
- August 2, 1989: Bob Brenly signed as a free agent.
- August 10, 1989: Goose Gossage was selected off waivers by the New York Yankees from the San Francisco Giants.

=== Major League debuts ===
- Batters: Mike Benjamin (July 7), Greg Litton (May 2)
- Pitchers: Randy McCament (June 28), Russ Swan (August 3), Stu Tate (September 20)

== Game log and schedule ==
Legend
	Giants win
	Giants loss
	Postponement
**Bold**	Giants team member

1989 Game Log (92–70) (Home: 53–28; Road: 39–42)
April (12–12) (Home: 6–4; Road: 6–8)

#	Date	Opponent	Score	Win	Loss	Save	Stadium	Attendance	Record	Report
1	April 3	@ Padres	5–3	**Reuschel** (1–0)		**LaCoss** (1)	Jack Murphy Stadium	52,763	1–0	W1
2	April 4	@ Padres	8–3	**Downs** (1–0)			Jack Murphy Stadium	21,768	2–0	W2
3	April 5	@ Padres	3–4		**Robinson** (0–1)		Jack Murphy Stadium	24,309	2–1	L1
4	April 7	@ Reds	3–4 (16)		**Price** (0–1)		Riverfront Stadium	25,278	2–2	L2
5	April 9	@ Reds	9–1	**Reuschel** (2–0)			Riverfront Stadium	23,152	3–2	W1
6	April 10	Dodgers	4–7		**LaCoss** (0–1)		**Candlestick Park**	53,015	3–3	L1
7	April 11	Dodgers	8–3	**Downs** (2–0)		**Lefferts** (1)	**Candlestick Park**	17,722	4–3	W1
8	April 12	Dodgers	3–1	**Garrelts** (1–0)		**LaCoss** (2)	**Candlestick Park**	19,035	5–3	W2
9	April 14	Braves	7–5	**Reuschel** (3–0)		**Lefferts** (2)	**Candlestick Park**	11,808	6–3	W3
10	April 15	Braves	1–0	**Hammaker** (1–0)			**Candlestick Park**	29,798	7–3	W4
11	April 16	Braves	2–7		**Downs** (2–1)		**Candlestick Park**	n/a	7–4	L1
12	April 16	Braves	6–1	**Price** (1–1)			**Candlestick Park**	26,048	8–4	W1
13	April 17	Padres	9–0	**Garrelts** (2–0)			**Candlestick Park**	12,161	9–4	W2
14	April 18	Padres	2–4		**Reuschel** (3–1)		**Candlestick Park**	11,509	9–5	L1
15	April 19	Padres	3–4		**Hammaker** (1–1)		**Candlestick Park**	22,701	9–6	L2
16	April 21	@ Dodgers	2–8		**Downs** (2–2)		Dodger Stadium	47,251	9–7	L3
17	April 22	@ Dodgers	5–4	**Lefferts** (1–0)			Dodger Stadium	48,347	10–7	W1
18	April 23	@ Dodgers	6–7 (10)		**Hammaker** (1–2)		Dodger Stadium	48,493	10–8	L1
19	April 25	@ Cardinals	4–0	**Robinson** (1–1)		**Lefferts** (3)	Busch Stadium	27,911	11–8	W1
20	April 26	@ Cardinals	1–3		**Downs** (2–3)		Busch Stadium	27,514	11–9	L1
21	April 27	@ Cardinals	1–10		**Garrelts** (2–1)		Busch Stadium	30,825	11–10	L2
22	April 28	@ Pirates	0–1		**Reuschel** (3–2)		Three Rivers Stadium	12,913	11–11	L1
23	April 29	@ Pirates	4–3	**LaCoss** (1–1)			Three Rivers Stadium	11,509	12–11	W1
24	April 30	@ Pirates	1–11		**Robinson** (1–2)		Three Rivers Stadium	20,940	12–12	L1

May (17–10) (Home: 10–6; Road: 7–4)

#	Date	Opponent	Score	Win	Loss	Save	Stadium	Attendance	Record	Report
25	May 1	Cubs	3–4 (12)		**LaCoss** (1–2)		**Candlestick Park**	17,914	12–13	L2
26	May 2	Cubs	4–0	**Reuschel** (4–2)		**Gossage** (1)	**Candlestick Park**	11,128	13–13	W1
27	May 3	Pirates	3–5		**Robinson** (1–3)		**Candlestick Park**	8,536	13–14	L1
28	May 4	Pirates	6–3	**Krukow** (1–0)		**Lefferts** (4)	**Candlestick Park**	11,820	14–14	W1
29	May 5	Cardinals	1–3		**LaCoss** (1–3)		**Candlestick Park**	24,401	14–15	L1
30	May 6	Cardinals	9–0	**Reuschel** (5–2)		**LaCoss** (3)	**Candlestick Park**	26,925	15–15	W1
31	May 7	Cardinals	5–1	**Robinson** (2–3)			**Candlestick Park**	50,492	16–15	W2
32	May 9	@ Cubs	4–2	**Krukow** (2–0)		**Lefferts** (5)	Wrigley Field	13,949	17–15	W3
33	May 10	@ Cubs	4–3	**LaCoss** (2–3)		**Lefferts** (6)	Wrigley Field	25,638	18–15	W4
34	May 12	@ Expos	2–1	**Reuschel** (6–2)		**Gossage** (2)	Olympic Stadium	15,851	19–15	W5
35	May 13	@ Expos	4–5		**Hammaker** (1–3)		Olympic Stadium	13,029	19–16	L1
36	May 14	@ Expos	3–4		**Krukow** (2–1)		Olympic Stadium	19,835	19–17	L2
37	May 15	@ Phillies	2–3 (12)		**Lefferts** (1–1)		Veterans Stadium	15,703	19–18	L3
38	May 16	@ Phillies	13–5	**Hammaker** (2–3)			Veterans Stadium	14,074	20–18	W1
39	May 17	@ Phillies	6–0	**Reuschel** (7–2)			Veterans Stadium	18,943	21–18	W2
40	May 19	@ Mets	2–3 (10)		**Lefferts** (1–2)		Shea Stadium	37,402	21–19	L1
41	May 20	@ Mets	3–0	**Krukow** (3–1)		**LaCoss** (4)	Shea Stadium	45,562	22–19	W1
42	May 21	@ Mets	10–6	**Hammaker** (3–3)		**Lefferts** (7)	Shea Stadium	44,660	23–19	W2
43	May 23	Expos	4–2	**Reuschel** (8–2)		**LaCoss** (5)	**Candlestick Park**	13,018	24–19	W3
44	May 24	Expos	0–1		**Robinson** (2–4)		**Candlestick Park**	9,889	24–20	L1
45	May 25	Expos	0–2		**Krukow** (3–2)		**Candlestick Park**	14,125	24–21	L2
46	May 26	Phillies	6–1	**Garrelts** (3–1)			**Candlestick Park**	12,787	25–21	W1
47	May 27	Phillies	6–2	**Hammaker** (4–3)		**Lefferts** (8)	**Candlestick Park**	18,325	26–21	W2
48	May 28	Phillies	8–5	**Reuschel** (9–2)		**LaCoss** (6)	**Candlestick Park**	51,498	27–21	W3
49	May 29	Mets	3–2	**Robinson** (3–4)		**Lefferts** (9)	**Candlestick Park**	38,899	28–21	W4
50	May 30	Mets	10–3	**Krukow** (4–2)			**Candlestick Park**	17,398	29–21	W5
51	May 31	Mets	1–3 (10)		**Lefferts** (1–3)		**Candlestick Park**	21,568	29–22	L1

June (18–10) (Home: 11–3; Road: 7–7)

#	Date	Opponent	Score	Win	Loss	Save	Stadium	Attendance	Record	Report
52	June 2	@ Braves	7–6	**Reuschel** (10–2)		**Gossage** (3)	Atlanta–Fulton County Stadium	14,052	30–22	W1
53	June 3	@ Braves	4–0	**Hammaker** (5–3)			Atlanta–Fulton County Stadium	16,181	31–22	W2
54	June 4	@ Braves	3–6		**Krukow** (4–3)		Atlanta–Fulton County Stadium	13,700	31–23	L1
55	June 5	@ Reds	11–8	**Garrelts** (4–1)			Riverfront Stadium	20,828	32–23	W1
56	June 6	@ Reds	3–4		**LaCoss** (2–4)		Riverfront Stadium	n/a	33–23	L1
57	June 6	@ Reds	3–2	**Reuschel** (11–2)		**Lefferts** (10)	Riverfront Stadium	28,830	33–24	W1
58	June 7	@ Reds	5–12		**Hammaker** (5–4)		Riverfront Stadium	25,896	33–25	L1
59	June 8	@ Reds	2–3		**LaCoss** (2–5)		Riverfront Stadium	29,217	33–26	L2
60	June 9	Padres	12–2	**Robinson** (4–4)			**Candlestick Park**	17,463	34–26	W1
61	June 10	Padres	1–0	**Garrelts** (5–1)		**Lefferts** (11)	**Candlestick Park**	29,116	35–26	W2
62	June 11	Padres	3–1 (12)	**Gossage** (1–0)			**Candlestick Park**	42,003	36–26	W3
63	June 13	Braves	3–2	**Hammaker** (6–4)		**Lefferts** (12)	**Candlestick Park**	10,484	37–26	W4
64	June 14	Braves	10–1	**Robinson** (5–4)			**Candlestick Park**	12,140	38–26	W5
65	June 15	Braves	1–2		**Garrelts** (5–2)		**Candlestick Park**	9,403	38–27	L1
66	June 16	Reds	4–5		**Gossage** (1–1)		**Candlestick Park**	23,986	38–28	L2
67	June 17	Reds	8–1	**Cook** (1–0)			**Candlestick Park**	34,476	39–28	W1
68	June 18	Reds	2–1	**LaCoss** (3–5)		**Lefferts** (13)	**Candlestick Park**	44,542	40–28	W2
69	June 19	Astros	3–2	**Robinson** (6–4)		**Bedrosian** (1)	**Candlestick Park**	22,386	41–28	W3
70	June 20	Astros	4–0	**Garrelts** (6–2)		**Lefferts** (14)	**Candlestick Park**	21,074	42–28	W4
71	June 21	Astros	2–0	**Reuschel** (12–2)		**Bedrosian** (2)	**Candlestick Park**	32,730	43–28	W5
72	June 23	@ Padres	8–7	**Gossage** (2–1)		**Bedrosian** (3)	Jack Murphy Stadium	21,721	44–28	W6
73	June 24	@ Padres	3–1	**Robinson** (7–4)		**Bedrosian** (4)	Jack Murphy Stadium	32,615	45–28	W7
74	June 25	@ Padres	7–10		**Garrelts** (6–3)		Jack Murphy Stadium	41,028	45–29	L1
75	June 26	@ Astros	4–3	**Lefferts** (2–3)		**Bedrosian** (5)	Astrodome	11,616	46–29	W1
76	June 27	@ Astros	5–7		**Bedrosian** (0–1)		Astrodome	33,231	46–30	L1
77	June 28	@ Astros	3–7		**Robinson** (7–5)		Astrodome	29,817	46–31	L2
78	June 29	Cubs	12–2	**Brantley** (1–0)			**Candlestick Park**	12,339	47–31	W1
79	June 30	Cubs	4–6		**Wilson** (0–1)		**Candlestick Park**	49,241	47–32	L1

July (14–12) (Home: 6–2; Road: 8–10)

#	Date	Opponent	Score	Win	Loss	Save	Stadium	Attendance	Record	Report
80	July 1	Cubs	2–3		**Reuschel** (12–3)		**Candlestick Park**	29,019	47–33	L2
81	July 2	Cubs	4–3	**Brantley** (2–0)		**Bedrosian** (6)	**Candlestick Park**	41,350	48–33	W1
82	July 4	@ Pirates	3–5		**Robinson** (7–6)		Three Rivers Stadium	14,186	48–34	L1
83	July 5	@ Pirates	6–4	**Wilson** (1–1)			Three Rivers Stadium	22,242	49–34	W1
84	July 6	@ Pirates	2–1 (10)	**Brantley** (3–0)		**Lefferts** (15)	Three Rivers Stadium	18,165	50–34	W2
85	July 7	@ Cardinals	4–6		**LaCoss** (3–6)		Busch Stadium	42,627	50–35	L1
86	July 8	@ Cardinals	8–5	**Brantley** (4–0)			Busch Stadium	47,400	51–35	W1
87	July 9	@ Cardinals	4–6		**Wilson** (1–2)		Busch Stadium	41,985	51–36	L1
88	July 13	Pirates	3–2 (13)	**Brantley** (5–0)			**Candlestick Park**	17,178	52–36	W1
89	July 14	Pirates	4–7		**Reuschel** (12–4)		**Candlestick Park**	18,238	52–37	L1
90	July 15	Pirates	8–3	**LaCoss** (4–6)			**Candlestick Park**	27,881	53–37	W1
91	July 16	Pirates	3–1	**Garrelts** (7–3)		**Bedrosian** (7)	**Candlestick Park**	44,781	54–37	W2
92	July 17	Cardinals	8–4	**McCament** (1–0)		**Gossage** (4)	**Candlestick Park**	25,643	55–37	W3
93	July 18	Cardinals	7–3	**Robinson** (8–6)			**Candlestick Park**	18,112	56–37	W4
94	July 19	Cardinals	7–5	**Brantley** (6–0)		**Lefferts** (16)	**Candlestick Park**	38,282	57–37	W5
95	July 20	@ Cubs	3–4 (11)		**McCament** (1–1)		Wrigley Field	32,306	57–38	L1
96	July 21	@ Cubs	4–3	**Garrelts** (8–3)		**Lefferts** (17)	Wrigley Field	34,725	58–38	W1
97	July 22	@ Cubs	2–5		**Hammaker** (6–5)		Wrigley Field	35,530	58–39	L1
98	July 23	@ Cubs	5–9		**Robinson** (8–7)		Wrigley Field	35,707	58–40	L2
99	July 24	@ Braves	2–0	**Reuschel** (13–4)		**Bedrosian** (8)	Atlanta–Fulton County Stadium	12,985	59–40	W1
100	July 25	@ Braves	5–4	**LaCoss** (5–6)		**Lefferts** (18)	Atlanta–Fulton County Stadium	10,564	60–40	W2
101	July 26	@ Braves	4–5		**Bedrosian** (0–2)		Atlanta–Fulton County Stadium	8,055	60–41	L1
102	July 27	@ Braves	1–10		**Hammaker** (6–6)		Atlanta–Fulton County Stadium	10,471	60–42	L2
103	July 28	@ Astros	3–2	**Robinson** (9–7)			Astrodome	38,845	61–42	W1
104	July 29	@ Astros	1–8		**Reuschel** (13–5)		Astrodome	39,602	61–43	L1
105	July 30	@ Astros	2–6		**LaCoss** (5–7)		Astrodome	41,088	61–44	L2

August (14–14) (Home: 7–9; Road: 7–5)

#	Date	Opponent	Score	Win	Loss	Save	Stadium	Attendance	Record	Report
106	August 1	@ Dodgers	5–2	**Garrelts** (9–3)		**Lefferts** (19)	Dodger Stadium	35,716	62–44	W1
107	August 2	@ Dodgers	4–7		**Wilson** (1–3)		Dodger Stadium	45,478	62–45	L1
108	August 3	@ Dodgers	3–6		**Swan** (0–1)		Dodger Stadium	43,516	62–46	L2
109	August 4	Astros	4–2	**Robinson** (10–7)			**Candlestick Park**	26,648	63–46	W1
110	August 5	Astros	7–0	**LaCoss** (6–7)			**Candlestick Park**	33,736	64–46	W2
111	August 6	Astros	2–3		**Lefferts** (2–4)		**Candlestick Park**	52,292	65–46	W3
112	August 7	Reds	2–10		**Brantley** (6–1)		**Candlestick Park**	23,905	65–47	L1
113	August 8	Reds	4–10		**Swan** (0–2)		**Candlestick Park**	20,765	65–48	L2
114	August 9	Reds	10–1	**Robinson** (11–7)			**Candlestick Park**	29,441	66–48	W1
115	August 10	Reds	4–3	**Dravecky** (1–0)		**Bedrosian** (9)	**Candlestick Park**	34,810	67–48	W2
116	August 11	Dodgers	10–2	**LaCoss** (7–7)			**Candlestick Park**	33,307	68–48	W3
117	August 12	Dodgers	1–5		**Knepper** (0–1)		**Candlestick Park**	49,772	68–49	L1
118	August 13	Dodgers	2–3 (12)		**Robinson** (11–8)		**Candlestick Park**	53,821	68–50	L2
119	August 15	@ Expos	3–2	**Dravecky** (2–0)		**Bedrosian** (10)	Olympic Stadium	24,490	69–50	W1
120	August 16	@ Expos	2–4		**Bedrosian** (0–3)		Olympic Stadium	24,719	69–51	L1
121	August 17	@ Expos	10–5	**Knepper** (1–1)			Olympic Stadium	21,057	70–51	W1
122	August 18	@ Phillies	5–2	**Reuschel** (14–5)		**Bedrosian** (11)	Veterans Stadium	23,368	71–51	W2
123	August 19	@ Phillies	0–1		**Downs** (2–4)		Veterans Stadium	30,366	71–52	L1
124	August 20	@ Phillies	5–2	**Brantley** (7–1)			Veterans Stadium	36,530	72–52	W1
125	August 21	@ Mets	1–4		**LaCoss** (7–8)		Shea Stadium	41,200	72–53	L1
126	August 22	@ Mets	5–0	**Knepper** (2–1)			Shea Stadium	48,249	73–53	W1
127	August 23	@ Mets	5–0	**Reuschel** (15–5)			Shea Stadium	43,694	74–53	W2
128	August 25	Expos	2–12		**Downs** (2–5)		**Candlestick Park**	23,272	74–54	L1
129	August 26	Expos	8–3	**Garrelts** (10–3)			**Candlestick Park**	29,527	74–55	W1
130	August 27	Expos	3–6		**LaCoss** (7–9)		**Candlestick Park**	31,536	74–56	L1
131	August 28	Phillies	1–9		**Reuschel** (15–6)		**Candlestick Park**	15,614	74–57	L2
132	August 29	Phillies	1–6		**Robinson** (11–9)		**Candlestick Park**	13,952	74–58	L3
133	August 30	Phillies	3–2	**Downs** (3–5)		**Bedrosian** (12)	**Candlestick Park**	19,053	75–58	W1

September (17–11) (Home: 12–4; Road: 5–7)

#	Date	Opponent	Score	Win	Loss	Save	Stadium	Attendance	Record	Report
134	September 1	Mets	7–1	**Garrelts** (11–3)			**Candlestick Park**	29,413	76–58	W2
135	September 2	Mets	6–2	**Reuschel** (16–6)			**Candlestick Park**	31,066	77–58	W3
136	September 3	Mets	4–0	**Robinson** (12–9)			**Candlestick Park**	44,084	78–58	W4
137	September 4	@ Reds	9–8	**Camacho** (1–0)		**Bedrosian** (13)	Riverfront Stadium	15,140	79–58	W5
138	September 5	@ Reds	5–6		**LaCoss** (7–10)		Riverfront Stadium	16,389	79–59	L1
139	September 6	@ Braves	7–2	**Garrelts** (12–3)			Atlanta–Fulton County Stadium	2,735	80–59	W1
140	September 7	@ Braves	7–5	**Bedrosian** (1–3)			Atlanta–Fulton County Stadium	4,474	81–59	W2
141	September 8	@ Astros	2–5		**Robinson** (12–10)		Astrodome	24,405	81–60	L1
142	September 9	@ Astros	1–4		**Downs** (3–6)		Astrodome	37,711	81–61	L2
143	September 10	@ Astros	5–3	**Knepper** (3–1)		**Lefferts** (20)	Astrodome	26,004	82–61	W1
144	September 11	Braves	3–2	**Garrelts** (13–3)		**Bedrosian** (14)	**Candlestick Park**	11,930	83–61	W2
145	September 12	Braves	5–6		**Bedrosian** (1–4)		**Candlestick Park**	11,077	83–62	L1
146	September 13	Reds	8–7 (13)	**Camacho** (2–0)			**Candlestick Park**	13,827	84–62	W1
147	September 14	Reds	4–3 (12)	**Camacho** (3–0)			**Candlestick Park**	15,969	85–62	W2
148	September 15	Padres	3–5		**Knepper** (3–2)		**Candlestick Park**	33,920	85–63	L1
149	September 17	Padres	5–3	**Garrelts** (14–3)		**Bedrosian** (15)	**Candlestick Park**	n/a	86–63	W1
150	September 17	Padres	1–6		**Reuschel** (16–7)		**Candlestick Park**	25,543	86–64	L1
151	September 19	Dodgers	3–2	**LaCoss** (8–10)		**Bedrosian** (16)	**Candlestick Park**	20,668	87–64	W1
152	September 20	Dodgers	8–7	**Wilson** (2–3)			**Candlestick Park**	21,420	88–64	W2
153	September 21	Dodgers	4–3	**Downs** (4–6)		**Bedrosian** (17)	**Candlestick Park**	24,896	89–64	W3
154	September 22	Astros	1–3		**Garrelts** (14–4)		**Candlestick Park**	33,020	89–65	L1
155	September 23	Astros	3–1	**Reuschel** (17–7)			**Candlestick Park**	46,664	90–65	W1
156	September 24	Astros	10–2	**LaCoss** (9–10)			**Candlestick Park**	50,871	91–65	W2
157	September 25	@ Dodgers	2–5		**Robinson** (12–11)		Dodger Stadium	23,007	91–66	L1
158	September 26	@ Dodgers	1–2		**Downs** (4–7)		Dodger Stadium	27,662	91–67	L2
159	September 27	@ Dodgers	0–1		**Garrelts** (14–5)		Dodger Stadium	34,210	91–68	L3
160	September 29	@ Padres	7–2	**LaCoss** (10–10)			Jack Murphy Stadium	52,089	92–68	W1
161	September 30	@ Padres	5–11		**Reuschel** (17–8)		Jack Murphy Stadium	47,787	92–69	L1

October (0–1) (Road: 0–1)

#	Date	Opponent	Score	Win	Loss	Save	Stadium	Attendance	Record	Report
162	October 1	@ Padres	0–3		**Downs** (4–8)		Jack Murphy Stadium	24,031	92–70	L2

=== Postseason ===
1989 Postseason Game Log
National League Championship Series (4–1)

Game	Date	Opponent	Score	Win	Loss	Save	Stadium	Attendance	Series	Report
1 NLCS	October 4	@ Cubs	11–3	**Garrelts** (1–0)	Maddux (0–1)		Wrigley Field	39,195	1–0	W1
2 NLCS	October 5	@ Cubs	5–9	Lancaster (1–0)	**Reuschel** (0–1)		Wrigley Field	39,195	1–1	L1
3 NLCS	October 7	Cubs	5–4	**Robinson** (1–0)	Lancaster (1–1)	**Bedrosian** (1)	**Candlestick Park**	62,065	2–1	W1
4 NLCS	October 8	Cubs	6–4	**Downs** (1–0)	Wilson (0–1)	**Bedrosian** (2)	**Candlestick Park**	62,078	3–1	W2
5 NLCS	October 9	Cubs	3–2	**Reuschel** (1–1)	Bielecki (0–1)	**Bedrosian** (3)	**Candlestick Park**	62,084	4–1	W3

World Series (0–4)

Game	Date	Opponent	Score	Win	Loss	Save	Stadium	Attendance	Series	Report
1 WS	October 14	@ Athletics	0–5	Stewart (1–0)	**Garrelts** (0–1)		Oakland–Alameda County Coliseum	49,385	0–1	L1
2 WS	October 15	@ Athletics	1–5	Moore (1–0)	**Reuschel** (0–1)		Oakland–Alameda County Coliseum	49,388	0–2	L2
3 WS	October 27	Athletics	7–13	Stewart (2–0)	**Garrelts** (0–2)		**Candlestick Park**	62,038	0–3	L3
4 WS	October 28	Athletics	6–9	Moore (2–0)	**Robinson** (0–1)	Eckersley (1)	**Candlestick Park**	62,032	0–4	L4

=== Roster ===
1989 San Francisco Giants
**Roster**
**Pitchers**: 40 Steve Bedrosian; 49 Jeff Brantley; 13 Ernie Camacho; 31 Dennis Cook; 37 Kelly Downs; 43 Dave Dravecky; 50 Scott Garrelts; 54 Goose Gossage; 14 Atlee Hammaker; 28 Bob Knepper; 39 Mike Krukow; 29 Mike LaCoss; 32 Craig Lefferts; 36 Randy McCament; 45 Terry Mulholland; 47 Joe Price; 48 Rick Reuschel; 31 Don Robinson; 33 Russ Swan; 33 Stu Tate; 41 Trevor Wilson	**Catchers**: 18 Bill Bathe; 10 Bob Brenly; 16 Terry Kennedy; 17 Kirt Manwaring; **Infielders**: 26 Mike Benjamin; 22 Will Clark; 26 Charlie Hayes; 8 Ed Jurak; 8 Mike Laga; 15 Greg Litton; 10 Ken Oberkfell; 1 Ernest Riles; 35 Chris Speier; 19 Jim Steels; 6 Robby Thompson; 23 José Uribe; 9 Matt Williams	**Outfielders**: 2 Brett Butler; 25 Tracy Jones; 21 Candy Maldonado; 7 Kevin Mitchell; 30 Donell Nixon; 25 Pat Sheridan; 45 Jim Weaver	**Manager**: 38 Roger Craig; **Coaches**: 12 Dusty Baker (Hitting); 42 Bill Fahey (Third base); 20 Wendell Kim (First base); 5 Bob Lillis (Bench); 34 Norm Sherry (Pitching)

=== Dave Dravecky ===
The previous season, a cancerous desmoid tumor was found in Dravecky's pitching arm. He underwent surgery on October 7, 1988, removing half of the deltoid muscle in his pitching arm and freezing the humerus bone in an effort to eliminate all of the cancerous cells. By July 1989, he was pitching in the minors, and on August 10, he made a highly publicized return to the major leagues, pitching 8 innings and defeating Cincinnati 4–3. In his following start five days later against the Expos, Dravecky pitched three no-hit innings, but in the fifth inning, he felt a tingling sensation in his arm. In the sixth inning he started off shaky, allowing a home run to the lead off batter and then hitting the second batter. Then, on his first pitch to Tim Raines, his humerus bone snapped, ending his career.

To see a pitcher break his arm with a loud cracking sound while doing something as ordinary as throwing a pitch, then fall to the ground rolling in agonizing pain, was shocking, unusual, and upsetting, especially for those who had followed his touching story. The pitch was replayed on television repeatedly over the following days.

The Giants won the National League pennant in 1989, and in the post-game celebration, Dravecky's arm was broken a second time. A doctor examining Dravecky's x-rays noticed a mass in his arm. Cancer had returned. Eighteen days later, Dravecky retired from baseball, aged 33, leaving a 64–57 record with 558 strikeouts and a 3.13 ERA in 1,062.2 innings. He won the 1989 Willie Mac Award honoring his spirit and leadership.

== Player stats ==
= Indicates team leader

=== Batting ===
==== Starters by position ====
Note: Pos = Position; G = Games played; AB = At bats; H = Hits; Avg. = Batting average; HR = Home runs; RBI = Runs batted in

Pos.	Player	G	AB	H	Avg.	HR	RBI
C	Terry Kennedy	125	355	85	.239	5	34
1B	Will Clark	159	588	196	.333	23	111
2B	Robby Thompson	148	547	132	.241	13	50
3B	Ernest Riles	122	302	84	.278	7	40
SS	José Uribe	151	453	100	.221	1	30
LF	Kevin Mitchell	154	543	158	.291	47	125
CF	Brett Butler	154	594	168	.283	4	36
RF	Candy Maldonado	129	345	75	.217	9	41

==== Other batters ====
Note: G = Games played; AB = At bats; H = Hits; Avg. = Batting average; HR = Home runs; RBI = Runs batted in

Player	G	AB	H	Avg.	HR	RBI
Matt Williams	84	292	59	.202	18	50
Kirt Manwaring	85	200	42	.210	0	18
Donell Nixon	95	166	44	.265	1	15
Pat Sheridan	70	161	33	.205	3	14
Greg Litton	71	143	36	.252	4	17
Ken Oberkfell	83	116	37	.319	2	15
Tracy Jones	40	97	18	.186	0	12
Ed Jurak	30	42	10	.238	0	1
Chris Speier	28	37	9	.243	0	2
Bill Bathe	30	32	9	.281	0	6
Bob Brenly	12	22	4	.182	0	3
Mike Laga	17	20	4	.200	1	7
Jim Weaver	12	20	4	.200	0	2
Jim Steels	13	12	1	.083	0	0
Mike Benjamin	14	6	1	.167	0	0
Charlie Hayes	3	5	1	.200	0	0

=== Pitching ===
==== Starting pitchers ====
Note: G = Games pitched; IP = Innings pitched; W = Wins; L = Losses; ERA = Earned run average; SO = Strikeouts

Player	G	IP	W	L	ERA	SO
Rick Reuschel	32	208.1	17	8	2.94	111
Don Robinson	34	197.0	12	11	3.43	96
Scott Garrelts	30	193.1	14	5	2.28	119
Kelly Downs	18	82.2	4	8	4.79	49
Mike Krukow	8	43.0	4	3	3.98	18
Dennis Cook	2	15.0	1	0	1.80	9
Dave Dravecky	2	13.0	2	0	3.46	5
Russ Swan	2	6.2	0	2	10.80	2

==== Other pitchers ====
Note: G = Games pitched; IP = Innings pitched; W = Wins; L = Losses; ERA = Earned run average; SO = Strikeouts

Player	G	IP	W	L	ERA	SO
Mike LaCoss	45	150.1	10	10	3.17	78
Atlee Hammaker	28	76.2	6	6	3.76	30
Bob Knepper	13	52.0	3	2	3.46	19
Trevor Wilson	14	39.1	2	3	4.35	22
Joe Price	7	14.0	1	1	5.79	10
Terry Mulholland	5	11.0	0	0	4.09	6

==== Relief pitchers ====
Note: G = Games pitched; W = Wins; L = Losses; SV = Saves; ERA = Earned run average; SO = Strikeouts

Player	G	W	L	SV	ERA	SO
Craig Lefferts	70	2	4	20	2.69	71
Jeff Brantley	59	7	1	0	4.07	69
Steve Bedrosian	40	1	4	17	2.65	34
Goose Gossage	31	2	1	4	2.68	24
Randy McCament	25	1	1	0	3.93	12
Ernie Camacho	13	3	0	0	2.76	14
Stu Tate	2	0	0	0	3.38	4

== National League Championship Series ==
=== Game 1 ===
October 4 at Wrigley Field in Chicago

Team	1	2	3	4	5	6	7	8	9	R	H	E
San Francisco	3	0	1	4	0	0	0	3	0	11	13	0
Chicago	2	0	1	0	0	0	0	0	0	3	8	1
W: Scott Garrelts (1–0) L: Greg Maddux (0–1) S: None
HR: SF – Will Clark (1), (2), Kevin Mitchell (1) CHC – Mark Grace (1), Ryne Sandberg (1)
Pitchers: SF – Garrelts, Brantley (8), Hammaker (9) CHC – Maddux, Kilgus (5), Wilson (8)
Attendance: 39,195

=== Game 2 ===
October 5 at Wrigley Field in Chicago

Team	1	2	3	4	5	6	7	8	9	R	H	E
San Francisco	0	0	0	2	0	0	0	2	1	5	10	0
Chicago	6	0	0	0	0	3	0	0	X	9	11	0
W: Les Lancaster (1–0) L: Rick Reuschel (0–1) S: None
HR: SF – Kevin Mitchell (2), Matt Williams (1), Robby Thompson (1) CHC – None
Pitchers: SF – Reuschel, Downs (1), Lefferts (6), Brantley (7), Bedrosian (8) CHC – Bielecki, Assenmacher (5), Lancaster (6)
Attendance: 39,195

=== Game 3 ===
October 7 at Candlestick Park in San Francisco, California

Team	1	2	3	4	5	6	7	8	9	R	H	E
Chicago	2	0	0	1	0	0	1	0	0	4	10	0
San Francisco	3	0	0	0	0	0	2	0	X	5	8	3
W: Don Robinson (1–0) L: Les Lancaster (1-1) S: Steve Bedrosian (1)
HR: CHC – None SF – Robby Thompson (2)
Pitchers: CHC – Sutcliffe, Assenmacher (7), Lancaster (7) SF – LaCoss, Brantley (4), Robinson (7), Lefferts (8), Bedrosian (9)
Attendance: 62,065

=== Game 4 ===
October 8 at Candlestick Park in San Francisco, California

Team	1	2	3	4	5	6	7	8	9	R	H	E
Chicago	1	1	0	0	2	0	0	0	0	4	12	1
San Francisco	1	0	2	1	2	0	0	0	X	6	9	1
W: Kelly Downs (1–0) L: Steve Wilson (0–1) S: Steve Bedrosian (2)
HR: CHC – Luis Salazar (1) SF – Matt Williams (2)
Pitchers: CHC – Maddux, Wilson (4), Sanderson (6), Williams (8) SF – Garrelts, Downs (5), Bedrosian (9)
Attendance: 62,078

=== Game 5 ===
October 9 at Candlestick Park in San Francisco, California

Team	1	2	3	4	5	6	7	8	9	R	H	E
Chicago	0	0	1	0	0	0	0	0	1	2	10	1
San Francisco	0	0	0	0	0	0	1	2	X	3	4	1
W: Rick Reuschel (1-1) L: Mike Bielecki (0–1) S: Steve Bedrosian (3)
HR: CHC – None SF – None
Pitchers: CHC – Bielecki, Williams (8), Lancaster (8) SF – Reuschel, Bedrosian (9)
Attendance: 62,084

The Giants made it to their first World Series since 1962 with a 3–2 win over the Cubs to win the 1989 National League pennant, four games to one. The final game pitted Mike Bielecki against a well-rested (due to his quick exit from Game 2) Rick Reuschel. Reuschel made amends for his poor start in Game 2 by giving up only one run over eight innings. The one run Reuschel gave up was an unearned run the Cubs scored when Walton reached on an error by Mitchell and then scored on Sandberg's double. The Cubs held the 1–0 lead until the seventh inning when Will Clark tripled and scored on Mitchell's sacrifice fly.

With two outs in the eighth, the Cubs appeared ready to perhaps send the series back to Chicago. But Candy Maldonado pinch-hit for Reuschel and walked. Bielcki then proceeded the load the bases by walking both Butler and Thompson. Don Zimmer sent for Mitch Williams to end the jam, but Clark drove a single to center that gave the Giants a 3–1 lead. The Cubs strung together three straight singles with two outs in the ninth to pull within a run, but Bedrosian got Sandberg to ground out to second to end the game and the series.

The Giants were in their first World Series since 1962. Clark's stellar performance earned him Most Valuable Player honors for the Giants. Clark hit .650 with eight RBIs.

== World Series ==
It was the first World Series in which the losing team never had the lead and never had the tying run at the plate in its final turn at-bat. The Giants were tied at the end of exactly two innings for the entire series: the first inning of Game 1 and the third inning of Game 2.

=== Game 1 ===
October 14, 1989, at Oakland Coliseum in Oakland, California.

Team	1	2	3	4	5	6	7	8	9	R	H	E
San Francisco	0	0	0	0	0	0	0	0	0	0	5	1
Oakland	0	3	1	1	0	0	0	0	X	5	11	1
W: Dave Stewart (1–0) L: Scott Garrelts (0–1)

=== Game 2 ===
October 15, 1989, at Oakland Coliseum in Oakland, California

Team	1	2	3	4	5	6	7	8	9	R	H	E
San Francisco	0	0	1	0	0	0	0	0	0	1	4	0
Oakland	1	0	0	4	0	0	0	0	X	5	7	0
W: Mike Moore (1–0) L: Rick Reuschel (0–1)

=== Game 3 ===
October 17, 1989, at Candlestick Park in San Francisco

The game was delayed until October 27, or about ten days, due to the Loma Prieta earthquake.

Team	1	2	3	4	5	6	7	8	9	R	H	E
Oakland	2	0	0	2	4	1	0	4	0	13	14	0
San Francisco	0	1	0	2	0	0	0	0	4	7	10	3
W: Dave Stewart (2–0) L: Scott Garrelts (0–2)

=== Game 4 ===
October 28, 1989, at Candlestick Park in San Francisco

Team	1	2	3	4	5	6	7	8	9	R	H	E
Oakland	1	3	0	0	3	1	0	1	0	9	12	0
San Francisco	0	0	0	0	0	2	4	0	0	6	9	0
W: Mike Moore (2–0) L: Don Robinson (0–1) S:Dennis Eckersley

== Award winners ==
- Will Clark, NLCS MVP
- Dave Dravecky, Hutch Award
- Dave Dravecky, Willie Mac Award
- Kevin Mitchell, National League MVP

All-Star Game

== Farm system ==
Level	Team	League	Manager
AAA	Phoenix Firebirds	Pacific Coast League	Gordon Mackenzie
AA	Shreveport Captains	Texas League	Bill Evers
A	San Jose Giants	California League	Duane Espy
A	Clinton Giants	Midwest League	Keith Bodie
A-Short Season	Everett Giants	Northwest League	Joe Strain
Rookie	Pocatello Giants	Pioneer League	Deron McCue
