= 1991 San Francisco Giants season =

1991 San Francisco Giants
- League: National League
- Division: West
- Ballpark: Candlestick Park
- City: San Francisco, California
- Record: 75–87 (.463)
- Divisional place: 4th
- Owners: Bob Lurie
- General managers: Al Rosen
- Managers: Roger Craig
- Television: KTVU (Duane Kuiper, Ron Fairly, Hank Greenwald); SportsChannel America (Joe Morgan, Duane Kuiper)
- Radio: KNBR (Ron Fairly, Hank Greenwald, Mike Krukow); KLOK (Tito Fuentes, Eduardo Ortega)

The San Francisco Giants played their 109th season in Major League Baseball in 1991. It was their 34th season in San Francisco since their move from New York following the 1957 season and their 32nd season at Candlestick Park. The team finished in fourth place in the National League West with a 75–87 record, 19 games behind the Atlanta Braves.

== Offseason ==
- November 9, 1990: Bud Black signed as a free agent with the San Francisco Giants.
- December 4, 1990: Dave Righetti signed as a free agent with the San Francisco Giants.
- December 4, 1990: Darren Lewis was traded by the Oakland Athletics with a player to be named later to the San Francisco Giants for Ernest Riles. The Oakland Athletics sent Pedro Pena (minors) (December 17, 1990) to the San Francisco Giants to complete the trade.
- March 30, 1991: Darnell Coles was signed as a free agent with the San Francisco Giants.

== Regular season ==
=== Season standings ===
NL West
Team	W	L	Pct.	GB	Home	Road
Atlanta Braves	94	68	.580	—	48‍–‍33	46‍–‍35
Los Angeles Dodgers	93	69	.574	1	54‍–‍27	39‍–‍42
San Diego Padres	84	78	.519	10	42‍–‍39	42‍–‍39
San Francisco Giants	75	87	.463	19	43‍–‍38	32‍–‍49
Cincinnati Reds	74	88	.457	20	39‍–‍42	35‍–‍46
Houston Astros	65	97	.401	29	37‍–‍44	28‍–‍53

=== Record vs. opponents ===
1991 National League record Sources:
Team	ATL	CHC	CIN	HOU	LAD	MON	NYM	PHI	PIT	SD	SF	STL
Atlanta	—	6–6	11–7	13–5	7–11	5–7	9–3	5–7	9–3	11–7	9–9	9–3
Chicago	6–6	—	4–8	9–3	2–10	10–7	11–6	8–10	7–11	4–8	6–6	10–8
Cincinnati	7–11	8–4	—	9–9	6–12	6–6	5–7	9–3	2–10	8–10	10–8	4–8
Houston	5–13	3–9	9–9	—	8–10	2–10	7–5	7–5	4–8	6–12	9–9	5–7
Los Angeles	11–7	10–2	12–6	10–8	—	5–7	7–5	7–5	7–5	10–8	8–10	6–6
Montreal	7–5	7–10	6–6	10–2	7–5	—	4–14	4–14	6–12	6–6	7–5	7–11
New York	3–9	6–11	7–5	5–7	5–7	14–4	—	11–7	6–12	7–5	6–6	7–11
Philadelphia	7-5	10–8	3–9	5–7	5–7	14–4	7–11	—	6–12	9–3	6–6	6–12
Pittsburgh	3–9	11–7	10–2	8–4	5–7	12–6	12–6	12–6	—	7–5	7–5	11–7
San Diego	7–11	8–4	10–8	12–6	8–10	6–6	5–7	3–9	5–7	—	11–7	9–3
San Francisco	9–9	6–6	8–10	9–9	10–8	5–7	6–6	6–6	5–7	7–11	—	4–8
St. Louis	3–9	8–10	8–4	7–5	6–6	11–7	11–7	12–6	7–11	3–9	8–4	—

=== Opening Day starters ===
- Kevin Bass
- Mike Benjamin
- John Burkett
- Will Clark
- Steve Decker
- Willie McGee
- Kevin Mitchell
- Robby Thompson
- Matt Williams

=== Notable transactions ===
- June 3, 1991: William Van Landingham was drafted by the San Francisco Giants in the 5th round of the 1991 amateur draft. Player signed June 6, 1991.
- June 19, 1991: Rick Reuschel was released by the San Francisco Giants.

=== Roster ===
1991 San Francisco Giants
Roster
Pitchers: 47 Rod Beck; 40 Bud Black; 49 Jeff Brantley; 33 John Burkett; 37 Kelly Downs; 50 Scott Garrelts; 53 Eric Gunderson; 36 Gil Heredia; 41 Bryan Hickerson; 29 Mike LaCoss; 48 Paul McClellan; 45 Francisco Oliveras; 14 Mike Remlinger; 48 Rick Reuschel; 19 Dave Righetti; 31 Don Robinson; 46 José Segura; 32 Trevor Wilson	Catchers: 35 Steve Decker; 16 Terry Kennedy; 8 Kirt Manwaring; Infielders: 10 Dave Anderson; 18 Mike Benjamin; 22 Will Clark; 21 Royce Clayton; 28 Tom Herr; 15 Greg Litton; 39 Tony Perezchica; 6 Robby Thompson; 23 José Uribe; 9 Matt Williams	Outfielders: 17 Kevin Bass; 21 Darnell Coles; 25 Mike Felder; 26 Mike Kingery; 1 Mark Leonard; 2 Darren Lewis; 51 Willie McGee; 7 Kevin Mitchell; 28 Rick Parker; 39 Ted Wood	Manager: 38 Roger Craig; Coaches: 12 Dusty Baker (hitting); 42 Bill Fahey (third base); 20 Wendell Kim (first base); 5 Bob Lillis (bench); 34 Norm Sherry (pitching)

== Player stats ==
=== Batting ===
==== Starters by position ====
Note: Pos = Position; G = Games played; AB = At bats; H = Hits; Avg. = Batting average; HR = Home runs; RBI = Runs batted in

Pos	Player	G	AB	H	Avg.	HR	RBI
C	Steve Decker	79	233	48	.206	5	24
1B	Will Clark	148	565	170	.301	29	116
2B	Robby Thompson	144	492	129	.262	19	48
3B	Matt Williams	157	589	158	.268	34	98
SS	José Uribe	90	231	51	.221	1	12
LF	Kevin Mitchell	113	371	95	.256	27	69
CF	Willie McGee	131	497	155	.312	4	43
RF	Kevin Bass	124	361	84	.233	10	40

==== Other batters ====
Note: G = Games played; AB = At bats; H = Hits; Avg. = Batting average; HR = Home runs; RBI = Runs batted in

Player	G	AB	H	Avg.	HR	RBI
Mike Felder	132	348	92	.264	0	18
Dave Anderson	100	226	56	.248	2	13
Darren Lewis	72	222	55	.248	1	15
Kirt Manwaring	67	178	40	.225	0	19
Terry Kennedy	69	171	40	.234	3	13
Mark Leonard	64	129	31	.240	2	14
Greg Litton	59	127	23	.181	1	15
Mike Kingery	91	110	20	.182	0	8
Mike Benjamin	54	106	13	.123	2	8
Tom Herr	32	60	15	.250	0	7
Tony Perezchica	23	48	11	.229	0	3
Royce Clayton	9	26	3	.115	0	2
Ted Wood	10	25	3	.120	0	1
Rick Parker	13	14	1	.071	0	1
Darnell Coles	11	14	3	.214	0	0

=== Pitching ===
==== Starting pitchers ====
Note: G = Games pitched; IP = Innings pitched; W = Wins; L = Losses; ERA = Earned run average; SO = Strikeouts

Player	G	IP	W	L	ERA	SO
Bud Black	34	214.1	12	16	3.99	104
John Burkett	36	206.2	12	11	4.18	131
Trevor Wilson	44	202.0	13	11	3.56	139
Paul McClellan	13	71.0	3	6	4.56	44
Mike Remlinger	8	35.0	2	1	4.37	19

==== Other pitchers ====
Note: G = Games pitched; IP = Innings pitched; W = Wins; L = Losses; ERA = Earned run average; SO = Strikeouts

Player	G	IP	W	L	ERA	SO
Don Robinson	34	121.1	5	9	4.38	78
Kelly Downs	45	111.2	10	4	4.19	62
Bryan Hickerson	17	50.0	2	2	3.60	43
Mike LaCoss	18	47.1	1	5	7.23	30
Gil Heredia	7	33.0	0	2	3.82	13
Scott Garrelts	8	19.2	1	1	6.41	8
Rick Reuschel	4	10.2	0	2	4.22	4

==== Relief pitchers ====
Note: G = Games pitched; W = Wins; L = Losses; SV = Saves; ERA = Earned run average; SO = Strikeouts

Player	G	W	L	SV	ERA	SO
Dave Righetti	61	2	7	24	3.39	51
Jeff Brantley	67	5	2	15	2.45	81
Francisco Oliveras	55	6	6	3	3.86	48
Rod Beck	31	1	1	1	3.78	38
José Segura	11	0	1	0	4.41	10
Eric Gunderson	2	0	0	1	5.40	2
Greg Litton	1	0	0	0	9.00	0

== Award winners ==
- Will Clark, National League Leader, Slugging (.536)
- Robby Thompson 2B, Willie Mac Award

All-Star Game

== Farm system ==
Level	Team	League	Manager
AAA	Phoenix Firebirds	Pacific Coast League	Duane Espy
AA	Shreveport Captains	Texas League	Bill Evers
A	San Jose Giants	California League	Ron Wotus
A	Clinton Giants	Midwest League	Jack Mull
A-Short Season	Everett Giants	Northwest League	Rob Ellis and Mike Bubalo
Rookie	AZL Giants	Arizona League	Nelson Rood

LEAGUE CHAMPIONS: Shreveport, Clinton
