= 1991 San Diego Padres season =

1991 San Diego Padres
- League: National League
- Division: West
- Ballpark: Jack Murphy Stadium
- City: San Diego
- Record: 84–78 (.519)
- Divisional place: 3rd
- Owners: Tom Werner
- General managers: Joe McIlvaine
- Managers: Greg Riddoch
- Television: KUSI-TV (Rick Monday, Jerry Coleman); San Diego Cable Sports Network (Bob Chandler, Ted Leitner); XHBJ-TV (Rafael Munoz, Victor Villa)
- Radio: KFMB (AM) (Bob Chandler, Jerry Coleman, Rick Monday, Ted Leitner); XEXX (Gustavo Lopez, Jr., Gustavo Lopez Moreno, Mario Thomas Zapiain)

The 1991 San Diego Padres season was the 23rd season in franchise history.

== Offseason ==
- December 3, 1990: Frank Seminara was drafted by the San Diego Padres from the New York Yankees in the 1990 rule 5 draft.
- December 12, 1990: Mark Parent was traded by the Padres to the Texas Rangers for Scott Coolbaugh.
- February 8, 1991: Jim Vatcher was selected off waivers by the Padres from the Atlanta Braves.

=== Blockbuster Deal ===
On December 4, 1990, the Padres traded second baseman Roberto Alomar and outfielder Joe Carter to the Toronto Blue Jays in exchange for first baseman Fred McGriff and shortstop Tony Fernández. Blue Jays GM Pat Gillick and Padres GM Joe McIlvaine originally talked about just trading Joe Carter for Fred McGriff. The Padres were losing Jack Clark and needed a new first baseman. The Blue Jays had John Olerud ready to take over at first base but were losing outfielder George Bell. Gillick decided to up the ante by trying to get Roberto Alomar. Gillick figured that with Garry Templeton in the twilight of his career, Fernández would be an adequate replacement. Alomar feuded with Padres manager Greg Riddoch and the thinking was that Bip Roberts and Joey Cora could platoon at second base. Alomar and Carter would go on to help the Toronto Blue Jays win the 1992 World Series and 1993 World Series.

== Regular season ==
- Atlanta Braves pitchers Kent Mercker, Mark Wohlers and Alejandro Pena combined for a no-hitter on September 11, 1991 in a 1-0 shutout win over the San Diego Padres. The 13th no-hitter in Braves franchise history, attendance was 20,477 at Fulton-County Stadium.

=== Opening Day starters ===
- Shawn Abner
- Jerald Clark
- Tony Fernández
- Tony Gwynn
- Fred McGriff
- Jim Presley
- Bip Roberts
- Benito Santiago
- Ed Whitson

=== Season standings ===
NL West
Team	W	L	Pct.	GB	Home	Road
Atlanta Braves	94	68	.580	—	48‍–‍33	46‍–‍35
Los Angeles Dodgers	93	69	.574	1	54‍–‍27	39‍–‍42
San Diego Padres	84	78	.519	10	42‍–‍39	42‍–‍39
San Francisco Giants	75	87	.463	19	43‍–‍38	32‍–‍49
Cincinnati Reds	74	88	.457	20	39‍–‍42	35‍–‍46
Houston Astros	65	97	.401	29	37‍–‍44	28‍–‍53

=== Record vs. opponents ===
1991 National League record Sources:
Team	ATL	CHC	CIN	HOU	LAD	MON	NYM	PHI	PIT	SD	SF	STL
Atlanta	—	6–6	11–7	13–5	7–11	5–7	9–3	5–7	9–3	11–7	9–9	9–3
Chicago	6–6	—	4–8	9–3	2–10	10–7	11–6	8–10	7–11	4–8	6–6	10–8
Cincinnati	7–11	8–4	—	9–9	6–12	6–6	5–7	9–3	2–10	8–10	10–8	4–8
Houston	5–13	3–9	9–9	—	8–10	2–10	7–5	7–5	4–8	6–12	9–9	5–7
Los Angeles	11–7	10–2	12–6	10–8	—	5–7	7–5	7–5	7–5	10–8	8–10	6–6
Montreal	7–5	7–10	6–6	10–2	7–5	—	4–14	4–14	6–12	6–6	7–5	7–11
New York	3–9	6–11	7–5	5–7	5–7	14–4	—	11–7	6–12	7–5	6–6	7–11
Philadelphia	7-5	10–8	3–9	5–7	5–7	14–4	7–11	—	6–12	9–3	6–6	6–12
Pittsburgh	3–9	11–7	10–2	8–4	5–7	12–6	12–6	12–6	—	7–5	7–5	11–7
San Diego	7–11	8–4	10–8	12–6	8–10	6–6	5–7	3–9	5–7	—	11–7	9–3
San Francisco	9–9	6–6	8–10	9–9	10–8	5–7	6–6	6–6	5–7	7–11	—	4–8
St. Louis	3–9	8–10	8–4	7–5	6–6	11–7	11–7	12–6	7–11	3–9	8–4	—

=== Notable transactions ===
- April 5, 1991: Mike Aldrete was signed as a free agent by the Padres.
- May 10, 1991: Mike Aldrete was released by the San Diego Padres.
- July 30, 1991: Shawn Abner was traded by the Padres to the California Angels for Jack Howell.

=== Roster ===
1991 San Diego Padres
Roster
Pitchers: 27 Larry Andersen; 40 Andy Benes; 56 Ricky Bones; 38 Pat Clements; 45 John Costello; 39 Wes Gardner; 14 Atlee Hammaker; 46 Greg W. Harris; 50 Jeremy Hernandez; 47 Bruce Hurst; 11 Craig Lefferts; 39 Jim Lewis; 26 Derek Lilliquist; 51 Mike Maddux; 48 José Meléndez; 37 Eric Nolte; 32 Adam Peterson; 43 Dennis Rasmussen; 42 Rich Rodriguez; 41 Steve Rosenberg; 30 Eric Show; 54 Tim Scott; 31 Ed Whitson	Catchers: 7 Dann Bilardello; 25 Tom Lampkin; 9 Benito Santiago; Infielders: 7 Marty Barrett; 12 Scott Coolbaugh; 8 Brian Dorsett; 23 Paul Faries; 1,8 Tony Fernández; 28 Jack Howell; 29 Fred McGriff; 15 José Mota; 18 Jim Presley; 10 Bip Roberts; 18 Craig Shipley; 1 Garry Templeton; 20 Tim Teufel	Outfielders: 28 Shawn Abner; 15 Mike Aldrete; 22 Oscar Azócar; 24 Jerald Clark; 19 Tony Gwynn; 33 Thomas Howard; 4 Darrin Jackson; 2 Jim Vatcher; 30 Kevin Ward; Other batters: 21 Phil Stephenson	Manager: 3 Greg Riddoch; Coaches: 34 Bruce Kimm (third base); 23 Rob Picciolo (first base); 16 Merv Rettenmund (hitting); 36 Mike Roarke (pitching); 29 Jim Snyder (bench)

== Player stats ==
=== Batting ===
==== Starters by position ====
Note: Pos = Position; G = Games played; AB = At bats; H = Hits; Avg. = Batting average; HR = Home runs; RBI = Runs batted in

Pos	Player	G	AB	H	Avg.	HR	RBI
C	Benito Santiago	152	580	155	.267	17	87
1B	Fred McGriff	153	528	147	.278	31	106
2B	Bip Roberts	117	424	119	.281	3	32
3B	Scott Coolbaugh	60	180	39	.217	2	15
SS	Tony Fernández	145	558	152	.272	4	38
LF	Jerald Clark	118	369	84	.228	10	47
CF	Darrin Jackson	122	359	94	.262	21	49
RF	Tony Gwynn	134	530	168	.317	4	62

==== Other batters ====
Note: G = Games played; AB = At bats; H = Hits; Avg. = Batting average; HR = Home runs; RBI = Runs batted in

Player	G	AB	H	Avg.	HR	RBI
Tim Teufel	97	307	70	.228	11	42
Thomas Howard	106	281	70	.249	4	22
Jack Howell	58	160	33	.206	6	16
Paul Faries	57	130	23	.177	0	7
Shawn Abner	53	115	19	.165	1	5
Kevin Ward	44	107	26	.243	2	8
Craig Shipley	37	91	25	.275	1	6
Jim Presley	20	59	8	.136	1	5
Tom Lampkin	38	58	11	.190	0	3
Oscar Azócar	38	57	14	.246	0	9
Garry Templeton	32	57	11	.193	1	6
José Mota	17	36	8	.222	0	2
Dann Bilardello	15	26	7	.269	0	5
Jim Vatcher	17	20	4	.200	0	2
Marty Barrett	12	16	3	.188	1	3
Mike Aldrete	12	15	0	.000	0	1
Brian Dorsett	11	12	1	.083	0	1
Phil Stephenson	11	7	2	.286	0	0

=== Pitching ===
==== Starting pitchers ====
Note: G = Games pitched; IP = Innings pitched; W = Wins; L = Losses; ERA = Earned run average; SO = Strikeouts

Player	G	IP	W	L	ERA	SO
Andy Benes	33	223.0	15	11	3.03	167
Bruce Hurst	31	221.2	15	8	3.29	141
Dennis Rasmussen	24	146.2	6	13	3.74	75
Greg W. Harris	20	133.0	9	5	2.23	95
Ed Whitson	13	78.2	4	6	5.03	40
Adam Peterson	13	54.2	3	4	4.45	37
Ricky Bones	11	54.0	4	6	4.83	31
Eric Nolte	6	22.0	3	2	11.05	15
Atlee Hammaker	1	4.2	0	1	5.79	1

==== Other pitchers ====
Note: G = Games pitched; IP = Innings pitched; W = Wins; L = Losses; ERA = Earned run average; SO = Strikeouts

Player	G	IP	W	L	ERA	SO
José Meléndez	31	93.2	8	5	3.27	60
Derek Lilliquist	6	14.1	0	2	8.79	7

==== Relief pitchers ====
Note: G = Games pitched; W = Wins; L = Losses; SV = Saves; ERA = Earned run average; SO = Strikeouts

Player	G	W	L	SV	ERA	SO
Craig Lefferts	54	1	6	23	3.91	48
Mike Maddux	64	7	2	5	2.46	57
Rich Rodriguez	64	3	1	0	3.26	40
Larry Andersen	38	3	4	13	2.30	40
John Costello	27	1	0	0	3.09	24
Wes Gardner	14	0	1	1	7.08	9
Pat Clements	12	1	0	0	3.77	8
Jim Lewis	12	0	0	0	4.15	10
Steve Rosenberg	10	1	1	0	6.94	6
Jeremy Hernandez	9	0	0	2	0.00	9
Tim Scott	2	0	0	0	9.00	1
Darrin Jackson	1	0	0	0	9.00	0

== Awards and honors ==
1991 Major League Baseball All-Star Game

== Farm system ==
Level	Team	League	Manager
AAA	Las Vegas Stars	Pacific Coast League	Jim Riggleman
AA	Wichita Wranglers	Texas League	Steve Lubratich
A	High Desert Mavericks	California League	Bruce Bochy
A	Waterloo Diamonds	Midwest League	Bryan Little
A	Charleston Rainbows	South Atlantic League	Dave Trembley
A-Short Season	Spokane Indians	Northwest League	Gene Glynn
Rookie	AZL Padres	Arizona League	Ken Berry

LEAGUE CHAMPIONS: High Desert
