= 1989 San Diego Padres season =

1989 San Diego Padres
- League: National League
- Division: West
- Ballpark: Jack Murphy Stadium
- City: San Diego, California
- Record: 89–73 (.549)
- Divisional place: 2nd
- Owners: Joan Kroc
- General managers: Jack McKeon
- Managers: Jack McKeon
- Television: KUSI-TV; San Diego Cable Sports Network
- Radio: KFMB (AM) (Rick Monday, Jerry Coleman, Bob Chandler, Ted Leitner); XEXX (Gustavo Lopez, Mario Thomas Zapiain, Eduardo Ortega)

The 1989 San Diego Padres season was the 21st season in franchise history. The Padres improved on their previous season record of 83–78, and were in contention for the National League West title until the final week of the regular season. However, a 2-1 loss to the Cincinnati Reds on September 27 ended their postseason hopes. The Padres finished in second place at 89–73, three games behind the San Francisco Giants.

This was the Padres' last full season under the ownership of Joan Kroc, who had inherited the franchise following the death of her husband Ray in 1984. Kroc sold the team to a consortium led by Tom Werner the following year.

== Offseason ==
- October 24, 1988: Lance McCullers, Jimmy Jones, and Stan Jefferson were traded by the Padres to the New York Yankees for Jack Clark and Pat Clements.
- December 8, 1988: Bruce Hurst was signed as a free agent by the Padres.
- March 30, 1989: Billy Taylor was signed as a free agent by the Padres.

== Regular season ==
=== Season standings ===
NL West
Team	W	L	Pct.	GB	Home	Road
San Francisco Giants	92	70	.568	—	53‍–‍28	39‍–‍42
San Diego Padres	89	73	.549	3	46‍–‍35	43‍–‍38
Houston Astros	86	76	.531	6	47‍–‍35	39‍–‍41
Los Angeles Dodgers	77	83	.481	14	44‍–‍37	33‍–‍46
Cincinnati Reds	75	87	.463	17	38‍–‍43	37‍–‍44
Atlanta Braves	63	97	.394	28	33‍–‍46	30‍–‍51

=== Record vs. opponents ===
1989 National League record Sources:
Team	ATL	CHC	CIN	HOU	LAD	MON	NYM	PHI	PIT	SD	SF	STL
Atlanta	—	5–7	8–10	8–10	6–10	6–6	2–10	8–4	4–8	7–11	6–12	3–9
Chicago	7–5	—	7–5	5–7	7–5	10–8	10–8	10–8	12–6	8–4	6–6	11–7
Cincinnati	10–8	5–7	—	8–10	8–10	4–8	4–8	4–8	7–5	9–9	8–10	8–4
Houston	10–8	7–5	10–8	—	10–8	4–8	6–6	9–3	7–5	8–10	8–10	7–5
Los Angeles	10–6	5–7	10–8	8–10	—	7–5	5–7	6–6	7–5	6–12	10–8	3–9
Montreal	6–6	8–10	8–4	8–4	5–7	—	9–9	9–9	11–7	5–7	7–5	5–13
New York	10–2	8–10	8–4	6–6	7–5	9–9	—	12–6	9–9	5–7	3–9	10–8
Philadelphia	4–8	8–10	8–4	3–9	6–6	9–9	6–12	—	10–8	2–10	4–8	7–11
Pittsburgh	8–4	6–12	5–7	5–7	5–7	7–11	9–9	8–10	—	3–9	5–7	13–5
San Diego	11–7	4–8	9–9	10–8	12–6	7–5	7–5	10–2	9–3	—	8–10	2–10
San Francisco	12–6	6–6	10–8	10–8	8–10	5–7	9–3	8–4	7–5	10–8	—	7–5
St. Louis	9–3	7–11	4–8	5–7	9–3	13–5	8–10	11–7	5–13	10–2	5–7	—

=== Notable transactions ===
- April 24, 1989: Randy Byers was traded by the Padres to the St. Louis Cardinals for Jeremy Hernandez.
- June 2, 1989: John Kruk and Randy Ready were traded by the Padres to the Philadelphia Phillies for Chris James.
- June 5, 1989: Darrell Sherman was drafted by the Padres in the 6th round of the 1989 Major League Baseball draft.
- June 29, 1989: Greg Booker was traded by the Padres to the Minnesota Twins for Freddie Toliver.
- July 22, 1989: Walt Terrell and a player to be named later were traded by the Padres to the New York Yankees for Mike Pagliarulo and Don Schulze. The Padres completed the deal by sending Freddie Toliver to the Yankees on September 27.
- August 30, 1989: Calvin Schiraldi, Darrin Jackson and a player to be named later were traded by the Cubs to the San Diego Padres for Marvell Wynne and Luis Salazar. The Cubs completed the deal by sending Phil Stephenson to the Padres on September 5.

=== Roster ===
1989 San Diego Padres
Roster
Pitchers: 40 Andy Benes; 51 Greg Booker; 38 Pat Clements; 48 Mark Davis; 55 Mark Grant; 46 Greg W. Harris; 47 Bruce Hurst; 52 Dave Leiper; 39 Dan Murphy; 37 Eric Nolte; 43 Dennis Rasmussen; 32 Calvin Schiraldi; 51 Don Schulze; 30 Eric Show; 35 Walt Terrell; 41 Freddie Toliver; 31 Ed Whitson	Catchers: 17 Sandy Alomar Jr.; 27 Mark Parent; 9 Benito Santiago; Infielders: 12 Roberto Alomar; 25 Jack Clark; 5 Joey Cora; 11 Tim Flannery; 20 Gary Green; 7 Rob Nelson; 13 Mike Pagliarulo; 5 Randy Ready; 4 Luis Salazar; 21 Phil Stephenson; 1 Garry Templeton	Outfielders: 28 Shawn Abner; 24,28 Jerald Clark; 19 Tony Gwynn; 4 Darrin Jackson; 18 Chris James; 8 John Kruk; 14 Carmelo Martínez; 10 Bip Roberts; 16 Marvell Wynne	Manager: 15 Jack McKeon; Coaches: 2 Sandy Alomar Sr. (third base); 36 Pat Dobson (pitching); 26 Amos Otis (hitting); 3 Greg Riddoch (first base); 34 Denny Sommers (bullpen)

== Player stats ==
=== Batting ===
==== Starters by position ====
Note: Pos = Position; G = Games played; AB = At bats; H = Hits; Avg. = Batting average; HR = Home runs; RBI = Runs batted in

Pos	Player	G	AB	H	Avg.	HR	RBI
C	Benito Santiago	129	462	109	.236	16	62
1B	Jack Clark	142	455	110	.242	26	94
2B	Roberto Alomar	158	623	184	.295	7	56
3B	Luis Salazar	95	246	66	.268	8	22
SS	Garry Templeton	142	506	129	.255	6	40
LF	Carmelo Martínez	111	267	59	.221	6	39
CF	Tony Gwynn	158	604	203	.336	4	62
RF	Chris James	87	303	80	.264	11	46

==== Other batters ====
Note: G = Games played; AB = At bats; H = Hits; Avg. = Batting average; HR = Home runs; RBI = Runs batted in

Player	G	AB	H	Avg.	HR	RBI
Bip Roberts	117	329	99	.301	3	25
Marvell Wynne	105	294	74	.252	6	35
Mike Pagliarulo	50	148	29	.196	3	14
Mark Parent	52	141	27	.191	7	21
Tim Flannery	73	130	30	.231	0	8
Shawn Abner	57	102	18	.176	2	14
Darrin Jackson	25	87	18	.207	3	12
Rob Nelson	42	82	16	.195	3	7
John Kruk	31	76	14	.184	3	6
Randy Ready	28	67	17	.254	0	5
Jerald Clark	17	41	8	.195	1	7
Gary Green	15	27	7	.259	0	0
Sandy Alomar Jr.	7	19	4	.211	1	6
Joey Cora	12	19	6	.316	0	1
Phil Stephenson	10	17	6	.353	2	2

=== Pitching ===
==== Starting pitchers ====
Note: G = Games pitched; IP = Innings pitched; W = Wins; L = Losses; ERA = Earned run average; SO = Strikeouts

Player	G	IP	W	L	ERA	SO
Bruce Hurst	33	244.2	15	11	2.69	179
Ed Whitson	33	227.0	16	11	2.66	117
Dennis Rasmussen	33	183.2	10	10	4.26	87
Walt Terrell	19	123.1	5	13	4.01	63
Eric Show	16	106.1	8	6	4.23	66
Andy Benes	10	66.2	6	3	3.51	66
Calvin Schiraldi	5	21.1	3	1	2.53	17

==== Other pitchers ====
Note: G = Games pitched; IP = Innings pitched; W = Wins; L = Losses; ERA = Earned run average; SO = Strikeouts

Player	G	IP	W	L	ERA	SO
Greg Harris	56	135.0	8	9	2.60	106
Don Schulze	7	24.1	2	1	5.55	15
Eric Nolte	3	11.0	0	0	11.00	8

==== Relief pitchers ====
Note: G = Games pitched; IP = Innings pitched; W = Wins; L = Losses; SV = Saves; ERA = Earned run average; SO = Strikeouts

Player	G	IP	W	L	SV	ERA	SO
Mark Davis	70	92.2	4	3	44	1.85	92
Mark Grant	50	116.1	8	2	2	3.33	69
Pat Clements	23	39.0	4	1	0	3.92	18
Dave Leiper	22	28.2	0	1	0	5.02	7
Greg Booker	11	19.0	0	1	0	4.26	8
Freddie Toliver	9	14.0	0	0	0	7.07	14
Dan Murphy	7	6.1	0	0	0	5.68	1

== Award winners ==
- Mark Davis, Cy Young Award Winner
- Jack Clark, National League Leader Walks (132)
- Tony Gwynn, National League Batting Champion (.336)
- Tony Gwynn, National League Leader Hits (203)
- Bruce Hurst, National League Leader Complete Games (10)

1989 Major League Baseball All-Star Game

== Farm system ==
Level	Team	League	Manager
AAA	Las Vegas Stars	Pacific Coast League	Steve Smith
AA	Wichita Pilots	Texas League	Pat Kelly
A	Riverside Red Wave	California League	Steve Lubratich
A	Charleston Rainbows	South Atlantic League	Jack Krol
A-Short Season	Spokane Indians	Northwest League	Bruce Bochy
Rookie	AZL Padres	Arizona League	Lonnie Keeter

LEAGUE CHAMPIONS: Spokane
