= 1990 San Diego Padres season =

1990 San Diego Padres
- League: National League
- Division: West
- Ballpark: Jack Murphy Stadium
- City: San Diego, California
- Record: 75–87 (.463)
- Divisional place: 5th
- Owners: Joan Kroc, Tom Werner
- General managers: Jack McKeon
- Managers: Jack McKeon, Greg Riddoch
- Television: KUSI-TV (Rick Monday, Jerry Coleman); San Diego Cable Sports Network
- Radio: KFMB (AM) (Bob Chandler, Jerry Coleman, Rick Monday, Ted Leitner); XEXX (Gustavo Lopez, Mario Thomas Zapiain, Eduardo Ortega)

The 1990 San Diego Padres season was the 22nd season in franchise history. The team regressed to a 75–87 record. They scored 673 runs and allowed 673 runs for a run differential of zero.

During the season, the Padres were sold by McDonald's heiress Joan Kroc to an ownership group led by Tom Werner.

== Offseason ==
- November 16, 1989: Don Schulze was released by the Padres.
- December 6, 1989: Fred Lynn was signed as a free agent by the Padres.
- December 6, 1989: Sandy Alomar Jr., Carlos Baerga and Chris James were traded by the Padres to the Cleveland Indians for Joe Carter.
- December 12, 1989: Craig Lefferts was signed by the Padres as a free agent.
- January 11, 1990: Ronn Reynolds was signed as a free agent with the San Diego Padres.
- February 27, 1990: Omar Olivares was traded by the Padres to the St. Louis Cardinals for Alex Cole and Steve Peters.

== Regular season ==
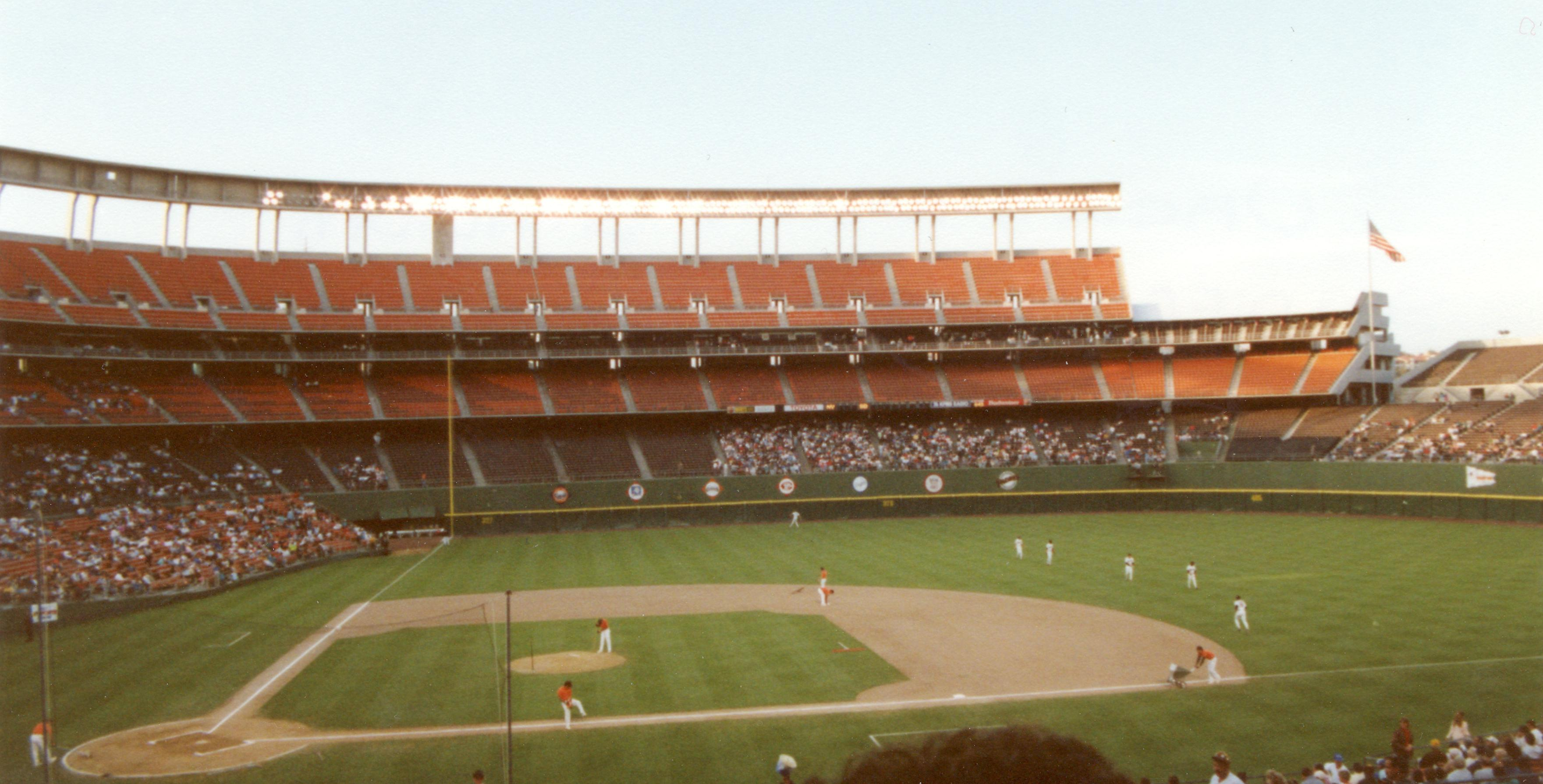
The Padres playing host to the New York Mets at Jack Murphy Stadium during a 1990 home game.

- Joe Carter set a club record for most RBIs in a season.
- July 12, 1990: Jack McKeon, holding the dual positions of general manager and field manager of the Padres, turns over the managing portfolio to one of his coaches, Greg Riddoch, during the All-Star break. The Padres are 37–43 (.463) and in fourth place in the NL West at the time of McKeon's resignation.
- July 25, 1990: Roseanne Barr performed a controversial rendition of the "Star Spangled Banner" before a game against the Cincinnati Reds. As she later reported, she was initially having trouble hearing herself over the public-address system, so she was singing as loudly as possible, and her rendition of the song sounded "screechy". Following her rendition, she mimicked the often-seen actions of players by spitting and grabbing her crotch as if adjusting a protective cup. Barr claimed she had been encouraged by baseball officials to "bring humor to the song". The song and the closing routine offended many in the audience, and it was replayed frequently on television, drawing further attention to it.
- September 23, 1990: Ten weeks after stepping down as field manager, McKeon is fired from his general manager position by the Padres' new ownership group. He had led the San Diego front office since July 1980 and had acquired many of the players who led the team to its 1984 National League pennant. He is replaced by New York Mets executive Joe McIlvaine.

=== Opening Day starters ===
- Roberto Alomar
- Joe Carter
- Jack Clark
- Tony Gwynn
- Fred Lynn
- Bip Roberts
- Benito Santiago
- Eric Show
- Garry Templeton

=== Season standings ===
NL West
Team	W	L	Pct.	GB	Home	Road
Cincinnati Reds	91	71	.562	—	46‍–‍35	45‍–‍36
Los Angeles Dodgers	86	76	.531	5	47‍–‍34	39‍–‍42
San Francisco Giants	85	77	.525	6	49‍–‍32	36‍–‍45
Houston Astros	75	87	.463	16	49‍–‍32	26‍–‍55
San Diego Padres	75	87	.463	16	37‍–‍44	38‍–‍43
Atlanta Braves	65	97	.401	26	37‍–‍44	28‍–‍53

=== Record vs. opponents ===
1990 National League record Sources:
Team	ATL	CHC	CIN	HOU	LAD	MON	NYM	PHI	PIT	SD	SF	STL
Atlanta	—	6–6	8–10	5–13	6–12	6–6	4–8	5–7	5–7	8–10	5–13	7–5
Chicago	6–6	—	4–8	6–6	3–9	11–7	9–9	11–7	4–14	8–4	7–5	8–10
Cincinnati	10–8	8–4	—	11–7	9–9	9–3	6–6	7–5	6–6	9–9	7–11	9–3
Houston	13–5	6–6	7–11	—	9–9	5–7	5–7	5–7	5–7	4–14	10–8	6–6
Los Angeles	12–6	9–3	9–9	9–9	—	6–6	5–7	8–4	4–8	9–9	8–10	7–5
Montreal	6–6	7–11	3–9	7–5	6–6	—	8–10	10–8	13–5	7–5	7–5	11–7
New York	8–4	9–9	6–6	7–5	7–5	10–8	—	10–8	10–8	5–7	7–5	12–6
Philadelphia	7-5	7–11	5–7	7–5	4–8	8–10	8–10	—	6–12	7–5	8–4	10–8
Pittsburgh	7–5	14–4	6–6	7–5	8–4	5–13	8–10	12–6	—	10–2	8–4	10–8
San Diego	10–8	4–8	9–9	14–4	9–9	5–7	7–5	5–7	2–10	—	7–11	3–9
San Francisco	13–5	5–7	11–7	8–10	10–8	5–7	5–7	4–8	4–8	11–7	—	9–3
St. Louis	5–7	10–8	3–9	6–6	5–7	7–11	6–12	8–10	8–10	9–3	3–9	—

=== Notable transactions ===
- June 4, 1990: 1990 Major League Baseball draft
  - Robbie Beckett was drafted by the Padres in the 1st round.
  - Alan Benes was drafted by the Padres in the 49th round, but did not sign.
- July 11, 1990: Alex Cole was traded by the Padres to the Cleveland Indians for Tom Lampkin.
- July 12, 1990: Mark Grant was traded by the Padres to the Atlanta Braves for Derek Lilliquist.
- August 24, 1990: Atlee Hammaker was signed as a free agent by the Padres.

=== Roster ===
1990 San Diego Padres
Roster
Pitchers: 40 Andy Benes; 38 Pat Clements; 44 John Davis; 41 Mike Dunne; 55 Mark Grant; 14 Atlee Hammaker; 46 Greg W. Harris; 47 Bruce Hurst; 11 Craig Lefferts; 26 Derek Lilliquist; 43 Dennis Rasmussen; 42 Rich Rodriguez; 32 Calvin Schiraldi; 30 Eric Show; 35 Rafael Valdez; 31 Ed Whitson	Catchers: 25 Tom Lampkin; 27 Mark Parent; 54 Ronn Reynolds; 9 Benito Santiago; Infielders: 12 Roberto Alomar; 00,25 Jack Clark; 24 Jerald Clark; 5 Joey Cora; 53 Paul Faries; 20 Gary Green; 13 Mike Pagliarulo; 21 Phil Stephenson; 1 Garry Templeton; 22 Eddie Williams	Outfielders: 28 Shawn Abner; 17 Joe Carter; 19 Tony Gwynn; 33 Thomas Howard; 4 Darrin Jackson; 8 Fred Lynn; 10 Bip Roberts; Other batters: 7 Rob Nelson	Manager: 15 Jack McKeon; 3 Greg Riddoch (appointed July 12); Coaches: 2 Sandy Alomar Sr. (third base); 36 Pat Dobson (pitching); 26 Amos Otis (hitting) (beginning of season-July 11); 23 Rob Picciolo (first base) (July 12th-end of season); 3 Greg Riddoch (first base) (through July 11); 34 Denny Sommers (bullpen); ? Jack Maloof (hitting) (July 12-end of season)

== Player stats ==
= Indicates team leader

=== Batting ===
==== Starters by position ====
Note: Pos = Position; G = Games played; AB = At bats; H = Hits; Avg. = Batting average; HR = Home runs; RBI = Runs batted in

Pos	Player	G	AB	H	Avg.	HR	RBI
C	Benito Santiago	100	344	93	.270	11	53
1B	Jack Clark	115	334	89	.266	25	62
2B	Roberto Alomar	147	586	168	.287	6	60
3B	Mike Pagliarulo	128	398	101	.254	7	38
SS	Garry Templeton	144	505	125	.248	9	59
LF	Bip Roberts	149	556	172	.309	9	44
CF	Joe Carter	162	634	147	.232	24	115
RF	Tony Gwynn	141	573	177	.309	4	72

==== Other batters ====
Note: G = Games played; AB = At bats; H = Hits; Avg. = Batting average; HR = Home runs; RBI = Runs batted in

Player	G	AB	H	Avg.	HR	RBI
Fred Lynn	90	196	47	.240	6	23
Mark Parent	65	189	42	.222	3	16
Shawn Abner	91	184	45	.245	1	15
Phil Stephenson	103	182	38	.209	4	19
Darrin Jackson	58	113	29	.257	3	9
Jerald Clark	52	101	27	.267	5	11
Joey Cora	51	100	27	.270	0	2
Tom Lampkin	26	63	14	.222	1	4
Thomas Howard	20	44	12	.273	0	0
Eddie Williams	14	42	12	.286	3	4
Paul Faries	14	37	7	.189	0	2
Ronn Reynolds	8	15	1	.067	0	1
Rob Nelson	5	5	0	.000	0	0

=== Pitching ===
==== Starting pitchers ====
Note: G = Games pitched; IP = Innings pitched; W = Wins; L = Losses; ERA = Earned run average; SO = Strikeouts

Player	G	IP	W	L	ERA	SO
Ed Whitson	32	228.2	14	9	2.60	127
Bruce Hurst	33	223.2	11	9	3.14	162
Andy Benes	32	192.1	10	11	3.60	140
Dennis Rasmussen	32	187.2	11	15	4.51	86

==== Other pitchers ====
Note: G = Games pitched; IP = Innings pitched; W = Wins; L = Losses; ERA = Earned run average; SO = Strikeouts

Player	G	IP	W	L	ERA	SO
Eric Show	39	106.1	6	8	5.76	55
Calvin Schiraldi	42	104.0	3	8	4.41	74
Derek Lilliquist	16	60.1	3	3	4.33	29
Mike Dunne	10	28.2	0	3	5.65	15
Atlee Hammaker	9	19.1	0	4	4.66	16

==== Relief pitchers ====
Note: G = Games pitched; IP = Innings pitched; W = Wins; L = Losses; SV = Saves; ERA = Earned run average; SO = Strikeouts

Player	G	IP	W	L	SV	ERA	SO
Craig Lefferts	56	78.2	7	5	23	2.52	60
Greg W. Harris	73	117.1	8	8	9	2.30	97
Rich Rodriguez	32	47.2	1	1	1	2.83	52
Mark Grant	26	39.0	1	1	0	4.85	29
Pat Clements	9	13.0	0	0	0	4.15	6
John Davis	6	9.1	0	1	0	5.79	7
Rafael Valdez	3	5.2	0	1	0	11.12	3

== Award winners ==
- Joe Carter, National League Leader in At-Bats (634)
- Jack Clark, National League Leader Walks (104)
- Bruce Hurst, National League Leader Shutouts (4)

1990 Major League Baseball All-Star Game

== Farm system ==
Level	Team	League	Manager
AAA	Las Vegas Stars	Pacific Coast League	Pat Kelly
AA	Wichita Wranglers	Texas League	Steve Lubratich
A	Riverside Red Wave	California League	Bruce Bochy
A	Waterloo Diamonds	Midwest League	Bryan Little
A	Charleston Rainbows	South Atlantic League	Jack Krol
A-Short Season	Spokane Indians	Northwest League	Gene Glynn
Rookie	AZL Padres	Arizona League	Jaime Moreno

LEAGUE CHAMPIONS: Spokane
