= Dave Dravecky =

American baseball player (born 1956)

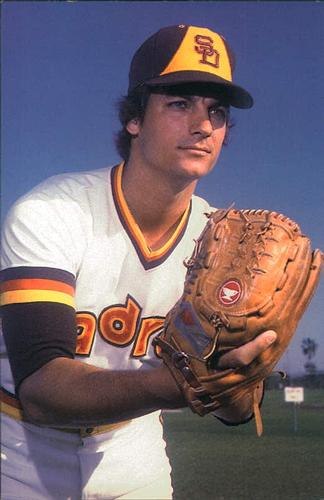
- Dravecky with the San Diego Padres c. 1983
- Pitcher
- Born: February 14, 1956 (age 70); Youngstown, Ohio, U.S.
- Batted: Right Threw: Left

MLB debut
- June 15, 1982, for the San Diego Padres

Last MLB appearance
- August 15, 1989, for the San Francisco Giants

MLB statistics
- Win–loss record: 64–57
- Earned run average: 3.13
- Strikeouts: 558
- Stats at Baseball Reference

Teams
- San Diego Padres (1982–1987); San Francisco Giants (1987–1989)

Career highlights and awards
- All-Star (1983)

David Francis Dravecky (born February 14, 1956) is an American former professional baseball player, motivational speaker, and author. A left-handed pitcher, Dravecky played Major League Baseball (MLB) for the San Diego Padres (1982–87) and the San Francisco Giants (1987–89). He was named an All-Star in 1983 and played with the Padres in the 1984 World Series.

In September 1988, Dravecky was diagnosed with a desmoid tumor in his left arm. He underwent surgery the following month. Dravecky returned to pitch for the Giants in August 1989 and won his first major league start of the season. In his second start, he broke his arm throwing a pitch. He retired from baseball after the season and, following a cancer recurrence, had his left arm amputated in 1991.

Following his baseball career, Dravecky became a motivational speaker and author. He has written four books.

== Early life ==
Dravecky was born on February 14, 1956, in Youngstown, Ohio. He has three brothers and a sister. Dravecky graduated from Boardman High School in Youngstown and from Youngstown State University, where he played baseball and basketball.

== Professional baseball career ==
The Pittsburgh Pirates drafted Dravecky in the 21st round of the 1978 Major League Baseball draft. The Pirates traded him to the San Diego Padres on April 5, 1981, for Bobby Mitchell.

=== San Diego Padres (1982–1987) ===
Dravecky made his major league debut on June 15, 1982, for the Padres. Pitching as a starter and as a reliever, he amassed a 5–3 record and a 2.57 earned run average (ERA).

Dravecky represented the Padres at the 1983 All-Star Game, pitching two scoreless innings and striking out George Brett. He started 28 games in 1983, finishing the season with a 14–10 record and 3.58 ERA.

Dravecky became friends with two other Padres pitchers, Eric Show and Mark Thurmond. Dravecky, Show, and Thurmond all held strong Christian beliefs. In the spring of 1984, Show recruited Dravecky and Thurmond to the John Birch Society, a far-right US political organization. The three players were the subjects of wide reporting after they distributed Birch literature from a booth at the June 1984 Del Mar Fair. Dravecky stated he saw Birch beliefs as the "natural outgrowth" of a born-again Christian philosophy. In 1987, the Associated Press wrote that Dravecky was better known for his association with the John Birch Society than he was for his pitching.

In 1984, the Padres won their first National League pennant. The Padres won a come-from-behind victory over the Chicago Cubs in Game 5 of the National League Championship Series, with Dravecky and three other relievers shutting out the Cubs over a combined 7 2/3 innings. Used as a starter and as a reliever, Dravecky finished the regular season with a 9–8 record, an earned run average of 2.93, and eight saves. In the 1984 postseason, Dravecky appeared out of the bullpen in five games without allowing a run. The Padres lost the World Series to the Detroit Tigers, four games to one.

Dravecky won 22 games for the Padres over the 1985 and 1986 seasons.

=== San Francisco Giants (1987–1989) ===
On July 4, 1987, the San Francisco Giants acquired Dravecky, pitcher Craig Lefferts, and third baseman Kevin Mitchell from the Padres for pitchers Keith Comstock, Mark Davis, and Mark Grant and third baseman Chris Brown for their pennant drive. Dravecky went 7–5 with three shutouts following the trade, helping the Giants to win the NL West. In the 1987 National League Championship Series, Dravecky pitched a shutout in Game Two against the St. Louis Cardinals and lost Game Six by a score of 1–0. The Cardinals won the series in seven games.

While with the Giants, Dravecky and teammates Scott Garrelts, Atlee Hammaker, and Jeff Brantley became known as the "God Squad" because of their strong Christian faith. Foregoing the hard-partying lifestyle of some of their teammates, they preferred to hold Bible studies in their hotel rooms while on the road.

Dravecky was the Giants' opening day starter in 1988, defeating the Los Angeles Dodgers 5–1. Shortly thereafter, he noticed stiffness in his pitching arm and was placed on the disabled list.

==== Cancer, comeback, and retirement ====
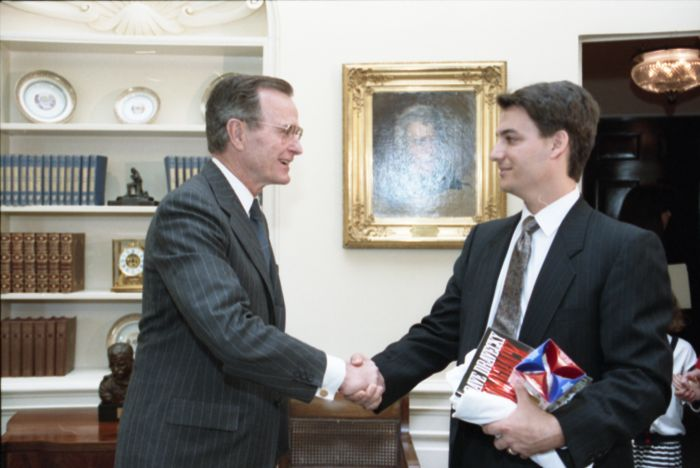
Dravecky with President George H. W. Bush in 1990

In September 1988, Dravecky was diagnosed with a desmoid tumor in his left (pitching) arm. On October 7, he underwent a surgical procedure in which half of the deltoid muscle in his left arm was removed and his humerus bone was frozen in an effort to eliminate all of the cancerous cells.

Doctors advised Dravecky to wait until 1990 to pitch again, but Dravecky was determined to pitch in 1989. By July 1989, he was pitching in the minors, and on August 10, he made a highly publicized return to the major leagues, pitching eight innings and defeating the Cincinnati Reds 4–3. In his following start, on August 15, 1989, Dravecky faced the Montreal Expos. In the fifth inning, he felt a tingling sensation in his arm. In the sixth inning, when he threw a pitch to Tim Raines, his humerus bone snapped. The sound of his arm breaking could be heard throughout Olympic Stadium. Dravecky collapsed on the mound; he had suffered a clean break midway between his shoulder and elbow, ending his season. Dravecky was credited with the win in the Giants' 3–2 victory.

The Giants won the National League pennant in 1989, defeating the Chicago Cubs in the NLCS in five games. On October 9, 1989, Dravecky's left arm was broken a second time when he was running out to the mound to celebrate the Giants' 3–2 victory in Game 5. The Giants went on to lose the World Series to the Oakland Athletics, four games to none. After a doctor found a lump in Dravecky's left arm, he opted to retire from baseball on November 13, 1989, to avoid risking further injury.

Dravecky ended his career with a 64–57 record with 558 strikeouts and a 3.13 earned run average in 1,062 2/3 innings. He won the 1989 Willie Mac Award honoring his spirit and leadership and the 1989 Hutch Award.

== Life and career after baseball ==
Dravecky underwent arm surgeries in January and May 1990, after which his cancer was found to have returned. On June 18, 1991, less than two years after his comeback with the Giants, Dravecky's left arm and shoulder were amputated. After recovering from the surgery, Dravecky began a new career as a motivational speaker.

Dravecky wrote three books about his battles with cancer and his comeback attempt: Comeback (1990), written with Tim Stafford, When You Can't Come Back (1992), co-authored with his wife Janice and Ken Gire, and The Worth of a Man (1996), with Connie Neal. Comeback was republished as a self-titled autobiography for children in 1992. Dravecky has also written a Christian motivational book, Called Up, published in 2004 by Zondervan.

Dravecky and his wife, Janice, have two children. Dravecky is a Christian.

In 2021, indie-folk artist Cousin Wolf released a song entitled "Dave Dravecky" as part of an album called "Nine Innings."
