= Scott Garrelts =

American baseball player

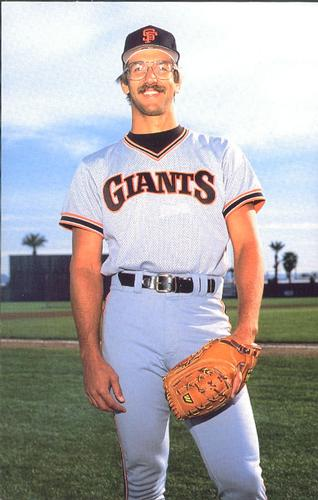
- Pitcher
- Born: October 30, 1961 (age 64); Urbana, Illinois, U.S.
- Batted: Right Threw: Right

MLB debut
- October 2, 1982, for the San Francisco Giants

Last MLB appearance
- June 10, 1991, for the San Francisco Giants

MLB statistics
- Win–loss record: 69–53
- Earned run average: 3.29
- Strikeouts: 703
- Stats at Baseball Reference

Teams
- San Francisco Giants (1982–1991)

Career highlights and awards
- All-Star (1985); NL ERA leader (1989); San Francisco Giants Wall of Fame

Scott William Garrelts (/ɡəˈrɛlts/ gə-RELTS; born October 30, 1961) is an American former Major League Baseball pitcher who played for the San Francisco Giants from 1982 to 1991. Garrelts's best year as a Giant came during the 1989 season, when he went 14-5 with a 2.28 ERA, leading his team to the World Series against their Bay Area rivals, the Oakland Athletics.

== High school and minors ==
Garrelts attended high school at Buckley Loda High School in Buckley, Illinois.

== Major League career ==
Garrelts was the Giants' lone All-Star in 1985, a season in which he led the team in wins and ERA, and had streak of 24 consecutive scoreless innings, all as a reliever. In 1986, he was second on the Giants in wins and strikeouts. Garrelts missed the final month of the 1987 season with a broken finger tip, but still finished second on the Giants in saves, a stat in which he led the team in 1988. He missed a month of the 1989 season with a pulled hamstring. During the season, Garrelts switched from the bullpen to a starting role and led the N.L. in ERA. He was second on the Giants in wins and strikeouts in 1990.

On July 29, 1990, Garrelts took a no-hitter into the ninth inning at home against the Cincinnati Reds, which was broken up by Paul O'Neill, with a two-out single over shortstop Jose Uribe's head.

While with the Giants, Garrelts and teammates Dave Dravecky, Atlee Hammaker, and Jeff Brantley became known as the "God Squad" because of their strong Christian faith. Forgoing the hard-partying lifestyle of many of their teammates, they preferred to hold Bible studies in their hotel rooms while on the road.

== See also ==
- List of Major League Baseball annual ERA leaders
- List of Major League Baseball players who spent their entire career with one franchise

Honorary titles
Preceded by David Green; 1981	Youngest Player in the National League; 1982	Succeeded by Gilberto Reyes; 1983
