= Jim Lewis (1990s pitcher) =

American baseball player (born 1964)

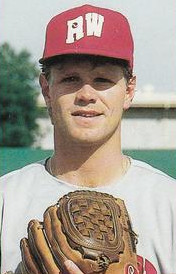
- Lewis in 1988
- Pitcher
- Born: July 20, 1964 (age 62); Jackson, Michigan
- Batted: Right Threw: Right

MLB debut
- August 9, 1991, for the San Diego Padres

Last MLB appearance
- October 5, 1991, for the San Diego Padres

MLB statistics
- Win–loss record: 2-3
- Earned run average: 4.15
- Strikeouts: 10
- Stats at Baseball Reference

Teams
- San Diego Padres (1991)

James Steven Lewis (born July 20, 1964) is former Major League Baseball pitcher. Lewis played for the San Diego Padres in 1991. He batted and threw right-handed.
