= Stu Tate =

American baseball player (1962–2026)

- Pitcher
- Born: June 17, 1962; Huntsville, Alabama, U.S.
- Died: January 13, 2026 (aged 63); Huntsville, Alabama, U.S.
- Batted: Right Threw: Right

MLB debut
- September 20, 1989, for the San Francisco Giants

Last MLB appearance
- September 30, 1989, for the San Francisco Giants

MLB statistics
- Games played: 2
- Innings pitched: 2.2
- Earned run average: 3.38
- Stats at Baseball Reference

Teams
- San Francisco Giants (1989)

Stuart Douglas Tate (June 17, 1962 – January 13, 2026) was an American professional baseball pitcher. He played in Major League Baseball (MLB) for the San Francisco Giants.

Tate was selected for the Triple-A All-Star Game in 1989.

Tate died January 13, 2026, at the age of 63.
