= Dan Murphy (baseball) =

American baseball player (born 1964)

- Pitcher
- Born: September 18, 1964 (age 61); Artesia, California, U.S.
- Batted: Right Threw: Right

MLB debut
- August 10, 1989, for the San Diego Padres

Last MLB appearance
- September 14, 1989, for the San Diego Padres

MLB statistics
- Win–loss record: 0–0
- Earned run average: 5.68
- Strikeouts: 1
- Stats at Baseball Reference

Teams
- San Diego Padres (1989)

Daniel Lee Murphy (born September 18, 1964) is an American former Major League Baseball pitcher. Murphy played for the San Diego Padres in 1989. He batted and threw right-handed.
