= Andrés Santana =

Dominican baseball player (born 1968)

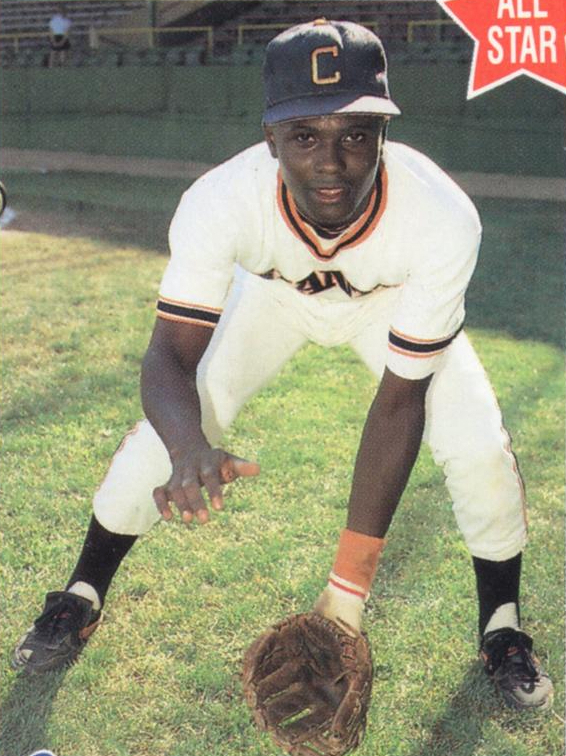
- Santana with the Clinton Giants c. 1988
- Shortstop / Pinch runner
- Born: February 5, 1968 (age 58); San Pedro de Macoris, Dominican Republic
- Batted: Both Threw: Right

MLB debut
- September 16, 1990, for the San Francisco Giants

Last MLB appearance
- October 3, 1990, for the San Francisco Giants

MLB statistics
- Games played: 6
- At bats: 2
- Runs batted in: 1

CPBL statistics
- Games played: 18
- Batting average: .306
- Runs batted in: 2
- Stats at Baseball Reference

Teams
- San Francisco Giants (1990); Uni-President Lions (1994)

Andrés Confesor Santana Belonis (born February 5, 1968) was a Dominican Major League Baseball player who played for the San Francisco Giants in 1990. He was used as a pinch hitter, and as a shortstop.
