= Hank Greenwald =

American sportscaster

- Born: Howard Sanford Greenwald; June 26, 1935; Detroit, Michigan, U.S.
- Died: October 22, 2018 (aged 83); San Francisco, California, U.S.
- Education: Syracuse University
- Sports commentary career
- Teams: San Francisco Giants (1979–86, 1989–96); New York Yankees (1987–88); Oakland Athletics (2004–05)
- Genre: Play-by-play
- Sport: Major League Baseball

Howard Sanford "Hank" Greenwald (June 26, 1935 — October 22, 2018) was an American sportscaster, known best for being a play-by-play announcer for the San Francisco Giants of Major League Baseball.

== Biography ==
=== Early career ===
A native Detroiter, Greenwald changed his name from Howard to Hank to honor Detroit Tigers Hall of Famer Hank Greenberg. Greenwald attended Syracuse University's journalism school and graduated in 1957. He began his broadcasting career on WAER calling Syracuse Orange Football games during the heyday of Jim Brown, Ernie Davis, Floyd Little, and Larry Csonka. He was also a broadcaster for the former NBA team, the Syracuse Nationals. In the 1960s, he broadcast Hawaii Islanders baseball in the Pacific Coast League.

=== San Francisco Giants (first and second stints) and the New York Yankees ===
Greenwald began calling games for the Giants in 1979, but ended this stint in 1986, after Greenwald had a disagreement with station management. After joining the New York Yankees radio broadcast team for the next two seasons, Greenwald returned to the Giants in 1989 when the team reached the World Series. Greenwald later expressed resentment toward Yankees owner George Steinbrenner, saying "Steinbrenner is everything you've heard, maybe worse."

He remained in San Francisco until 1996, when he announced his retirement. At the time he retired, Greenwald had announced 2,798 consecutive games. In his book This Copyrighted Broadcast, Greenwald cites disagreements with Giants' Vice President Larry Baer as his reason for retiring. The Giants hired former Baltimore Orioles and ESPN announcer Jon Miller as Greenwald's replacement.

Perhaps Hank Greenwald's most memorable call was his emotional description of the final out in Game 5 of the 1989 National League Championship Series (which sent the San Francisco Giants to the World Series for the first time since 1962).

Twenty-seven years of waiting have come to an end! The Giants have won the pennant!

This came after Greenwald called Giants first baseman Will Clark's pennant clinching hit off of Chicago Cubs relief pitcher Mitch Williams in the bottom of the eighth inning:

And Clark hits it up the middle, into center-field, base hit!!! Maldonado scores! Here comes Butler...on his way to third is Thompson, the Giants lead three to one!!! And Superman has done it again!

=== CBS Radio ===
In 1997, Greenwald was employed by the CBS Radio network as a baseball announcer, calling Saturday Game of the Week broadcasts as well as that year's NLDS between the Giants and Florida Marlins.

=== Oakland Athletics ===
In 2004, Greenwald was hired as a television play-by-play announcer for the Oakland Athletics working about 1/3 of the team's telecasts with analyst Ray Fosse. He announced games for the A's in the 2004 and 2005 seasons.

==== Other San Francisco Bay Area assignments ====
Greenwald also called basketball play-by-play for the Golden State Warriors (with legendary announcer Bill King) and the University of San Francisco Dons.

== Personal life ==
Greenwald married Carla Reiter in 1973. His son Doug (born 1974) is the play-by-play announcer for the Fresno Grizzlies, formerly the Giants' AAA affiliate and now the Houston Astros' affiliate. He also has announced baseball and women's basketball for the Santa Clara Broncos. His first game announcing for the major league Giants was on September 6, 2009; he filled in for regular announcer Dave Flemming.
