= Eric Nolte =

American baseball player (born 1964)

- Pitcher
- Born: April 28, 1964 (age 61); Canoga Park, California, U.S.
- Batted: Left Threw: Left

MLB debut
- August 1, 1987, for the San Diego Padres

Last MLB appearance
- June 1, 1991, for the Texas Rangers

MLB statistics
- Win–loss record: 5–8
- Earned run average: 5.62
- Strikeouts: 69
- Stats at Baseball Reference

Teams
- San Diego Padres (1987–1989, 1991); Texas Rangers (1991)

Eric Carl Nolte (born April 28, 1964) is a former Major League Baseball pitcher who played for four seasons. He was drafted by the Padres in the Sixth Round of the 1985 MLB draft. He pitched for the San Diego Padres from 1987 to 1989 and 1991 and the Texas Rangers in 1991. Nolte recorded his first MLB win on August 1, 1987.
