= Mark Leonard (baseball) =

American baseball player (born 1964)

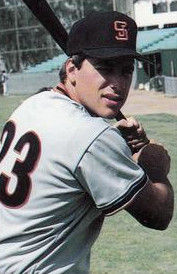
- Leonard in 1988
- Outfielder
- Born: August 14, 1964 (age 61); Mountain View, California, U.S.
- Batted: Left Threw: Right

MLB debut
- July 21, 1990, for the San Francisco Giants

Last MLB appearance
- October 1, 1995, for the San Francisco Giants

MLB statistics
- Batting average: .227
- Home runs: 8
- Runs batted in: 41
- Stats at Baseball Reference

Teams
- San Francisco Giants (1990–1992); Baltimore Orioles (1993); San Francisco Giants (1994–1995)

Mark David Leonard (born August 14, 1964) is a former outfielder in Major League Baseball. Between 1990 and 1995 he played for the Baltimore Orioles and the San Francisco Giants.
