= Randy McCament =

American baseball player (born 1962)

- Pitcher
- Born: July 29, 1962 (age 63); Albuquerque, New Mexico
- Batted: Right Threw: Right

MLB debut
- June 28, 1989, for the San Francisco Giants

Last MLB appearance
- May 21, 1990, for the San Francisco Giants

MLB statistics
- Win–loss record: 1–1
- Earned run average: 3.80
- Strikeouts: 17
- Stats at Baseball Reference

Teams
- San Francisco Giants (1989–1990)

Larry Randall McCament (born July 29, 1962) is a retired Major League Baseball pitcher.

McCament attended Grand Canyon University. He was signed as a 15th-round pick in the 1985 Major League Baseball draft by the San Francisco Giants. He was a starter in his first season in pro ball, 1985, going 7–3 for the Everett Giants, but thereafter was a reliever. He spent parts of five seasons in the Texas League and parts of four seasons in the Pacific Coast League. McCament made his MLB debut with the Giants in 1989, pitching in 25 games. He pitched in 3 games for the Giants in 1990. He continued to pitch in the minors until 1992. In 1995, he was a replacement player in spring training for the Seattle Mariners during the ongoing strike.
