= Russ Swan (baseball) =

American baseball player (1964–2006)

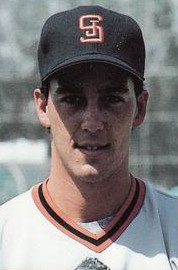
- Swan in 1988
- Pitcher
- Born: January 3, 1964; Fremont, California, U.S.
- Died: April 26, 2006 (aged 42); Las Vegas, Nevada, U.S.
- Batted: Left Threw: Left

MLB debut
- August 3, 1989, for the San Francisco Giants

Last MLB appearance
- April 30, 1994, for the Cleveland Indians

MLB statistics
- Win–loss record: 14–22
- Earned run average: 4.83
- Strikeouts: 108
- Stats at Baseball Reference

Teams
- San Francisco Giants (1989–1990); Seattle Mariners (1990–1993); Cleveland Indians (1994)

Russell Howard Swan (January 3, 1964 – April 26, 2006) was an American professional baseball relief pitcher who played from 1989 through 1994 for the San Francisco Giants, Seattle Mariners, and Cleveland Indians of Major League Baseball (MLB).

Listed at 6' 4", 210 lb., Swan was a southpaw reliever usually used in the setup role, although he occasionally worked as a closer in the 1991 and 1992 seasons. He was selected by the Giants in the ninth round of the 1986 MLB draft. He made his MLB debut with the Giants in 1989, then was traded to the Mariners for Gary Eave in May 1990. In his first start for Seattle, he took a no-hitter into the eighth inning against the Detroit Tigers on June 9. After an injury-plagued 1993 season, Seattle released him, and he signed with Cleveland for the 1994 season. He played in the minors in 1995 and 1996.

Following his playing retirement, Swan worked as a pitching coach at Washington State University and for the Colorado Rockies organization.

On April 17, 2006, Swan was found unconscious after a fall in a stairwell in Lake Havasu City, Arizona. He had been found without a wallet or any identification. Swan died nine days later at a hospital in Las Vegas, at the age of 42. He was survived by his wife and two children.
