= Paul McClellan =

American baseball player (born 1966)

- Pitcher
- Born: February 3, 1966 (age 60); San Mateo, California, U.S.
- Batted: Right Threw: Right

MLB debut
- September 2, 1990, for the San Francisco Giants

Last MLB appearance
- October 6, 1991, for the San Francisco Giants

MLB statistics
- Win–loss record: 3–7
- Earned run average: 5.26
- Strikeouts: 46
- Stats at Baseball Reference

Teams
- San Francisco Giants (1990–1991)

Paul William McClellan (born February 3, 1966) is a former American Major League baseball player for the San Francisco Giants.

McClellan, a graduate of Sequoia High School and the College of San Mateo. He was a first round draft pick by the Giants in 1986. He played his last game with the Giants on October 6, 1991. His MLB career earned run average was 5.26. Later, McClellan joined the now defunct Sonoma County Crushers minor league team which operated between 1995 through 2002.
