= Jeff Brantley =

American baseball player (born 1963)

- Pitcher
- Born: September 5, 1963 (age 63); Florence, Alabama, U.S.
- Batted: Right Threw: Right

MLB debut
- August 5, 1988, for the San Francisco Giants

Last MLB appearance
- May 23, 2001, for the Texas Rangers

MLB statistics
- Win–loss record: 43–46
- Earned run average: 3.39
- Strikeouts: 728
- Saves: 172
- Stats at Baseball Reference

Teams
- San Francisco Giants (1988–1993); Cincinnati Reds (1994–1997); St. Louis Cardinals (1998); Philadelphia Phillies (1999–2000); Texas Rangers (2001)

Career highlights and awards
- All-Star (1990); NL Rolaids Relief Man Award (1996); NL saves leader (1996); San Francisco Giants Wall of Fame

Jeffrey Hoke Brantley (born September 5, 1963) is an American former professional baseball relief pitcher who played in Major League Baseball (MLB) for 14 seasons, from 1988 to 2001. Brantley, whose nickname is Cowboy, was hired in 2006 as a broadcaster for one of his former teams, the Cincinnati Reds.

== Early career ==
Brantley lettered in three sports at W. A. Berry High School (which was replaced by Hoover High School). Brantley was the quarterback on a Berry state championship football team.

Brantley played college baseball at Mississippi State University, where he was a teammate of Will Clark, Rafael Palmeiro and Bobby Thigpen on a Bulldogs team that participated in the 1985 College World Series. He is co-holder of the SEC record for career wins by a pitcher with 45, tied with Kip Bouknight.

== Major league career ==
Brantley played for the San Francisco Giants, Cincinnati Reds, St. Louis Cardinals and Philadelphia Phillies, all of the National League, and the Texas Rangers of the American League. He was a member of the 1989 Giants that defeated the Chicago Cubs to win the National League pennant and eventually lost to the Oakland A's in the World Series. In the World Series, he pitched in three games with an ERA of 4.15.

Brantley was an All-Star in 1990, finishing the season with a 5–3 record and a 1.56 ERA. He led the National League in 1996 with 44 saves.

In 2010, he was inducted into the Mississippi Sports Hall of Fame.

== Broadcasting career ==
Brantley was a color commentator for ESPN broadcasts of Major League Baseball games and an in-studio contributor for Baseball Tonight from 2002 through 2006. In October 2006, he joined the radio broadcast team of the Cincinnati Reds on the Cincinnati Reds Radio Network, led by flagship station WLW. He also joined Marty Brennaman and Thom Brennaman on the FSN Ohio television broadcast team, which also featured Chris Welsh and George Grande.

== Personal ==
Brantley and his wife, Ashley have two children, while he also has two children from a previous marriage.

Brantley is a devout Christian. While with the Giants, Brantley and teammates Scott Garrelts, Atlee Hammaker and Dave Dravecky became known as the "God Squad" because of their strong Christian faith. Foregoing the hard-partying lifestyle of many of their teammates, they preferred to hold Bible studies in their hotel rooms while on the road.

== See also ==
- List of Major League Baseball annual saves leaders
