= Robby Thompson =

American baseball player (born 1962)

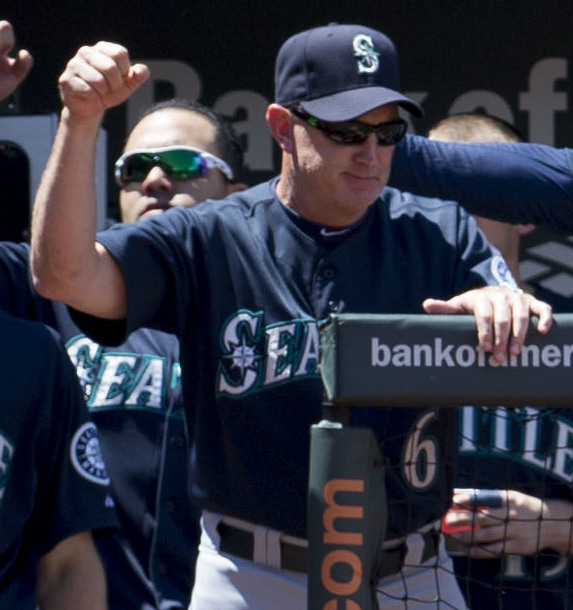
- Thompson with the Seattle Mariners in 2013
- Second baseman
- Born: May 10, 1962 (age 64); West Palm Beach, Florida, U.S.
- Batted: Right Threw: Right

MLB debut
- April 8, 1986, for the San Francisco Giants

Last MLB appearance
- September 22, 1996, for the San Francisco Giants

MLB statistics
- Batting average: .257
- Home runs: 119
- Runs batted in: 458
- Stats at Baseball Reference

Teams
- As player: San Francisco Giants (1986–1996); As coach: San Francisco Giants (2000–2001); Cleveland Indians (2002, 2005); Seattle Mariners (2011–2013)

Career highlights and awards
- 2× All-Star (1988, 1993); Gold Glove Award (1993); Silver Slugger Award (1993); San Francisco Giants Wall of Fame

Robert Randall Thompson (born May 10, 1962) is an American former professional baseball player and coach. He played his entire career in Major League Baseball (1986–1996) with the San Francisco Giants where he was their starting second baseman for eleven straight years. Although he was often overshadowed by his contemporary, Hall of Fame second baseman Ryne Sandberg, Thompson was a two-time All-Star player who served as a catalyst for the powerful Giants offense led by Will Clark and Kevin Mitchell during the team's resurgence in the late 1980s.

After his playing career, Thompson coached for the Giants, Cleveland Indians, and Seattle Mariners.

== Early life ==
Thompson was born in West Palm Beach, Florida. He attended Forest Hill Community High School in West Palm Beach, where he played high school baseball for the Forest Hill Falcons. He played shortstop for Palm Beach Junior College in 1981 and 1982 and received an athletic scholarship to attend the University of Florida in 1983, where he played for head coach Jack Rhine's Florida Gators baseball team. He was drafted by the San Francisco Giants in the first round of the 1983 Major League Baseball draft, and decided to forgo his remaining NCAA eligibility. In 1985, while playing for the Shreveport Captains in the Texas League, he posted a .261 batting average along with 9 home runs and was named to the league All-Star team.

== MLB playing career ==
Thompson made his major league debut with the Giants on April 8, 1986, at the age of 24. In June, he became the first player in major league history to be caught stealing four times in one game (three occurred during attempted hit and run plays). Despite his rocky start, Thompson ended the season with a .271 batting average as the Giants leadoff hitter and provided steady defense. He won the Sporting News Rookie of the Year Award and finished second to Todd Worrell in the 1986 National League Rookie of the Year Award. Thompson had surgery at the end of the season to have cartilage removed from his right knee.

Thompson continued to perform well defensively in 1987, teaming up with Giants shortstop José Uribe to form one of the best double play combinations in baseball, and helped the Giants lead the major leagues with 183 double plays. The Giants clinched the National League Western Division title by six games over the Cincinnati Reds. In the 1987 National League Championship Series, Thompson played in pain with a bulging disc but still played well defensively helping the Giants set a playoff record with 10 double plays. He also hit 1 home run and had 2 runs batted in as the Giants were defeated by the St. Louis Cardinals in a seven-game series.

In 1988, Thompson was hitting above .300 at mid-season to earn a spot as a reserve on the 1988 National League All-Star team. Unfortunately, he was once again plagued by an injury and had to miss the game due to a pinched nerve in his leg. Brett Butler took over as the Giants leadoff hitter and Thompson, as the new number two hitter in the batting order, struggled to make contact, striking out 111 times and ending the year with a .264 average.

In 1989, Thompson's batting average dropped to .241. However, he led the National League with 11 triples and scored a career-high 91 runs while hitting ahead of Will Clark and Kevin Mitchell in the batting order. The Giants once again won the Western Division crown and faced the Chicago Cubs in the 1989 National League Championship Series. Thompson hit 2 home runs in the series including a game-winning two-run home run in Game 3 as the Giants went on to win the series in five games. The victory marked the first time in 27 years that the Giants had won the National League pennant. Thompson was held to only one hit in the 1989 World Series against the Oakland Athletics as the Giants were swept in four straight games.

Thompson's best year statistically was in 1993 when he was hitting for a .325 average at mid-season to earn his second All-Star selection; however, a leg injury would once again force him to miss the game. The Giants had a nine-game lead on August 11 but faltered in September and were caught by the Atlanta Braves, though by no fault of Thompson, who increased his offensive output late in the season including a period in August where he hit home runs in five consecutive games. With 10 games left in the season on September 24, Thompson suffered a broken cheek bone when he was hit by a pitch thrown by Trevor Hoffman of the San Diego Padres. He missed 8 games due to the injury, but with the Giants and Braves tied for first place Thompson returned to play the final game of the season. Despite his determination, playing with a bloodshot eye and wearing a clear plastic mask in the field, the Giants lost the National League West on the last day of the season.

Thompson ended the season with career highs in batting average (.312), doubles (30), home runs (19) and runs batted in (65). Although Thompson was one of the best fielding second basemen in the National League, he was often overlooked in post-season awards because his playing career coincided with that of Baseball Hall of Fame second baseman Ryne Sandberg. By 1993, Sandberg was past his prime and Thompson finally received recognition when he won the Gold Glove Award and Silver Slugger Award. He was rewarded by the Giants in November when he signed a three-year contract for $12 million, making him the second-highest paid second baseman in baseball after Sandberg.

During spring training in 1994, Thompson received a scare when he was hit on the left ear flap of his batting helmet by pitcher Mike Harkey of the Colorado Rockies. Thompson later stated the two beanings by Hoffman and Harkey were on his mind when he batted during games. In May, he went onto the disabled list and missed almost two months of the season. He returned in late June, but played in only seven games before undergoing surgery on his right shoulder and missed the rest of the season. Thompson's injuries continued to hamper his playing time in 1995 and in September he had to undergo surgery again, this time on his left shoulder. He returned to play in 1996 but injuries continued to take their toll as he appeared in only 63 games. Thompson played his last major league game on September 22, 1996, at the age of 34.

Thompson was known for the well-used baseball glove with which he played for almost his entire career. He was offended when the San Francisco Chronicle printed a story titled, "Thompson's Ugly, Pathetic Glove is a Gem." Rich Aurilia, who played at shortstop next to Thompson near the end of his career said, "I think by the time Robby was done, the glove mainly consisted of pine tar and chew spit. I don't even know how much leather was left in it. I know for a fact Robby still has that glove."

== Career statistics ==
In an eleven-year major league career Thompson played in 1,304 games, accumulating 1,187 hits in 4,612 at bats for a .257 career batting average along with 119 home runs, 458 runs batted in and a .329 on-base percentage. He led the National League in triples in 1989 with 11 and he finished his career with a .983 fielding percentage. Thompson led National League second basemen in double plays for three consecutive seasons from 1990 to 1992. He hit for the cycle in a game on April 22, 1991.

A two-time All-Star, Thompson was the recipient of one Gold Glove Award and one Silver Slugger Award. He won the Willie Mac Award in 1991, honoring his spirit and leadership. At the time of his retirement, Thompson was the all-time leader among Giants second basemen in games (1,304), at bats (4,612), runs (671), hits (1,187), doubles (238), triples (39), home runs (119), runs batted in (458), stolen bases (103), fielding percentage (.983) and double plays (873).

== Coaching career ==
Thompson served as the Giants first base coach in 2000 and 2001. He was hired by the Cleveland Indians as a first base coach in December 2001. In 2003, he was promoted to special assistant to the Cleveland Indians' general manager before returning to the field in June 2005 as the Indians' bench coach. In November 2010, Thompson was hired by the Seattle Mariners as their bench coach. On July 22, 2013, Thompson began serving as interim manager while Eric Wedge recovered from a minor stroke. Thompson returned to his role as bench coach on August 23, 2013. On November 1, 2013, the Mariners fired Thompson.

== See also ==
- List of Florida Gators baseball players
- List of Major League Baseball players to hit for the cycle
- List of Major League Baseball annual triples leaders
- List of Major League Baseball players who spent their entire career with one franchise

Achievements
Preceded by George Brett	Hitting for the cycle April 22, 1991	Succeeded by Paul Molitor
