= Don Robinson (baseball) =

American baseball player (born 1957)

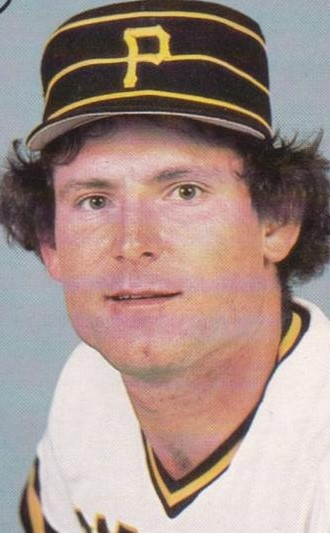
- Pitcher
- Born: June 8, 1957 (age 69); Ashland, Kentucky, U.S.
- Batted: Right Threw: Right

MLB debut
- April 10, 1978, for the Pittsburgh Pirates

Last MLB appearance
- July 12, 1992, for the Philadelphia Phillies

MLB statistics
- Win–loss record: 109–106
- Earned run average: 3.79
- Strikeouts: 1,251
- Stats at Baseball Reference

Teams
- Pittsburgh Pirates (1978–1987); San Francisco Giants (1987–1991); California Angels (1992); Philadelphia Phillies (1992)

Career highlights and awards
- World Series champion (1979); 3× Silver Slugger Award (1982, 1989, 1990)

Don Allen "Donnie" Robinson (born June 8, 1957) is an American former Major League Baseball pitcher who played for the Pittsburgh Pirates, San Francisco Giants, California Angels, and Philadelphia Phillies, from 1978 through 1992. Nicknamed "the Caveman", Robinson's career record was 109–106 with a 3.79 ERA.

== Career ==
In 1978, as a 21-year-old rookie, Robinson was 14–6 with a 3.47 ERA. His won-loss percentage was second to NL Cy Young Award winner Gaylord Perry. Robinson was named The Sporting News NL Rookie Pitcher of the Year and was third in overall NL Rookie of the Year. He finished eighth in the Cy Young Award contest.

The next year, he went 8–8 with a 3.87 ERA. He also pitched in six postseason games, winning two and helping the Pirates to the 1979 World Series championship.

Robinson was regarded as one of the best-hitting pitchers during his time, winning three Silver Slugger Awards in 1982, 1989, and 1990. In 1990, Robinson hit a home run while appearing as a pinch-hitter against the San Diego Padres, becoming the first pitcher to do so since Gary Peters in 1971. He hit 13 home runs in his career. He compiled a .231 batting average (146–631) with 47 runs and 69 RBI.

Robinson was the recipient of the Hutch Award in 1984. On April 18, 1987, he gave up Mike Schmidt's 500th career home run. He appeared in the World Series again in 1989, winning Game 3 of the NLCS for the Giants against the Chicago Cubs. Robinson enjoyed a renaissance with the Giants: from 1987 to 1991, he was 42–33 with a 3.56 ERA, and started a majority of his 170 games with them.

Don Robinson is the pitching coach for the State College of Florida baseball team in Bradenton, Florida.
