= Kelly Downs =

American baseball player (born 1960)

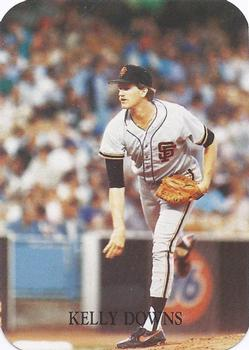
- Pitcher
- Born: October 25, 1960 (age 65); Ogden, Utah, U.S.
- Batted: Right Threw: Right

MLB debut
- July 29, 1986, for the San Francisco Giants

Last MLB appearance
- September 29, 1993, for the Oakland Athletics

MLB statistics
- Win–loss record: 57–53
- Earned run average: 3.86
- Strikeouts: 598
- Stats at Baseball Reference

Teams
- San Francisco Giants (1986–1992); Oakland Athletics (1992–1993)

Kelly Robert Downs (born October 25, 1960) is an American former professional baseball pitcher who played in Major League Baseball (MLB) for the San Francisco Giants and Oakland Athletics from 1986 to 1993. He wore uniform number 37 for his seven years with the Giants, and number 31 for his two seasons with the A's.

Downs won a career high 13 games in 1988 for the Giants and appeared in the 1989 World Series versus the Athletics. He was featured on the cover of Sports Illustrated on October 30, 1989, carrying his nephew in his arms after the Loma Prieta earthquake (magnitude 7.1) disrupted Game 3, at Candlestick Park.

Downs graduated from Viewmont High School in 1979.

His brother, Dave Downs, pitched briefly for the 1972 Philadelphia Phillies.
