= Trevor Wilson (baseball) =

American baseball player

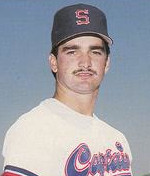
- Wilson with the Shreveport Captains in 1988
- Pitcher
- Born: June 7, 1966 (age 59); Torrance, California, U.S.
- Batted: Left Threw: Left

MLB debut
- September 5, 1988, for the San Francisco Giants

Last MLB appearance
- September 26, 1998, for the Anaheim Angels

MLB statistics
- Win–loss record: 41–46
- Earned run average: 3.87
- Strikeouts: 431
- Stats at Baseball Reference

Teams
- San Francisco Giants (1988–1993, 1995); Anaheim Angels (1998)

Trevor Kirk Wilson (born June 7, 1966) is an American former professional baseball pitcher who played in Major League Baseball (MLB) for the San Francisco Giants and Anaheim Angels, in all or parts of eight seasons between 1988 and 1998.

== Career ==
Wilson graduated from Oregon City High School in Oregon City, Oregon. He enrolled at Oregon State University out of high school, but only attended for one term before deciding to turn professional, never playing baseball for the Beavers.

On June 7, 1992, Wilson struck out all three batters on nine total pitches in the ninth inning of a 5–2 win over the Houston Astros, becoming the 18th National League pitcher and the 27th pitcher in major-league history to throw an immaculate inning.

Since his retirement, Wilson has served as pitching coach for a number of minor league teams. His longest tenure was with the Salem-Keizer Volcanoes, from 2000 to 2003.
