= Greg Litton =

American baseball player (born 1964)

- Utility player
- Born: July 13, 1964 (age 62); New Orleans, Louisiana, U.S.
- Batted: Right Threw: Right

MLB debut
- May 2, 1989, for the San Francisco Giants

Last MLB appearance
- August 10, 1994, for the Boston Red Sox

MLB statistics
- Batting average: .241
- Home runs: 13
- Runs batted in: 97
- Stats at Baseball Reference

Teams
- San Francisco Giants (1989–1992); Seattle Mariners (1993); Boston Red Sox (1994)

Jon Gregory Litton (born July 13, 1964) is a former utility player in Major League Baseball for the San Francisco Giants, Seattle Mariners, and Boston Red Sox. The Giants drafted Litton in the first round with the 10th overall selection of the 1984 MLB draft.

Litton most often played second base, the outfield, and third base. He also played shortstop, first base, and catcher, and made one appearance as a pitcher. His personal high for playing time was during the 1990 season, when he was in 93 games and made 220 plate appearances.

== Career highlights ==
- Batted .500 (3-for-6) in the 1989 World Series against the Oakland Athletics, including a two-run homer in Game 4 off reliever Gene Nelson
- Pitched in the 9th inning of 14-6 loss to Houston Astros, giving up one earned run (July 4, 1991)
- Eight 3-hit games, including two doubles and a home run against the Chicago Cubs (May 15, 1992)
- A pinch-hit grand slam in the top of the 13th inning to defeat the Cincinnati Reds (October 4, 1992)
- Two doubles, good for four runs batted in, against the Kansas City Royals (September 16, 1993)
- Hit a combined .417 (20-for-48) against All-Star pitchers Norm Charlton, Danny Jackson, Greg Maddux, and Frank Viola

He finished his career with a batting average of .241, 13 home runs, 97 RBI, and 78 runs scored in 374 ballgames.

== Political Activity ==
Litton has lost three Republican primary elections in Florida. In 2004, Litton ran for office to serve as the Escambia County Supervisor of Elections. He lost to David Stafford in the Republican primary. In 2018, Litton ran for an open County Commission seat in Escambia County. Litton lost in the Republican primary, garnering less than 20% of the vote. In 2022, Litton ran for a seat in the Florida House of Representatives. Litton challenged incumbent Alex Andrade in the Republican primary. Litton again lost in the Republican primary, garnering less than 21% of the vote.

== Post-playing career and personal life ==
Litton is now divorced and has two children.

On departing baseball Litton worked with a close friend as a jeweler. Soon after, Litton began a professional relationship with Pensacola businessman Quint Studer that led to opportunities as an announcer for the Double-A Pensacola Blue Wahoos and as motivational speaker for the Studer Group. Litton has also worked as a mortgage originator.
