= San Diego Cable Sports Network =

Pay-per-view television service

San Diego Cable Sports Network was a pay-per-view service offered by Cox Communications. It was established in 1984 to provide telecasts of San Diego Padres games, initially offering 40 games a season. Games could be purchased separately or as a package. In addition to Cox, Sun Cable and American Cable Television also provided the service. The 1993 season was the last for the Padres on San Diego Cable Sports Network, as they would sign a deal with Prime Ticket to appear on a new subfeed of that network in 1994.
