= Craig Lefferts =

American baseball player (born 1957)

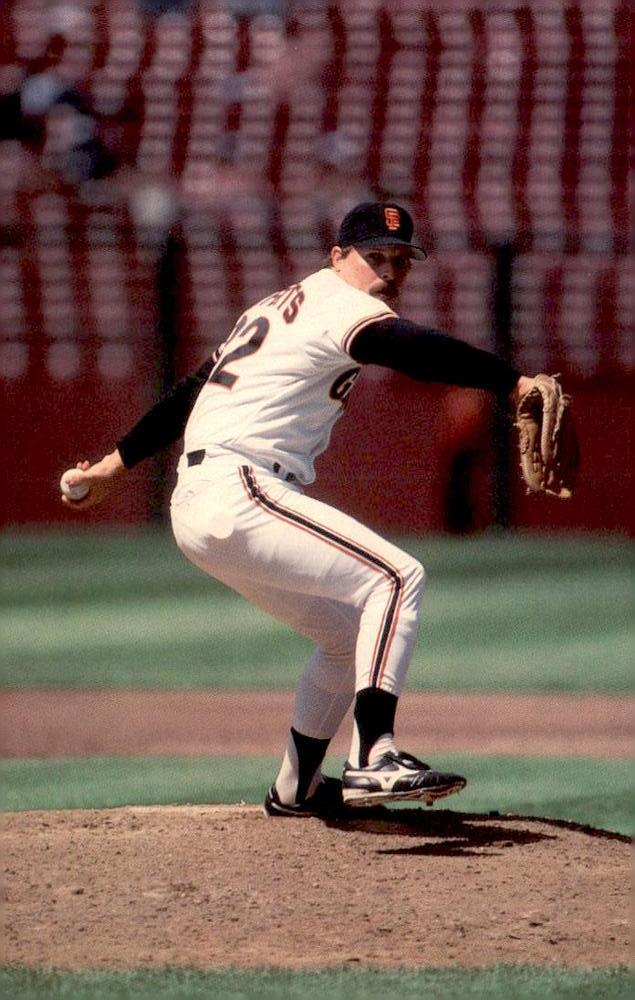
- Lefferts with the San Francisco Giants c. 1988
- Pitcher
- Born: September 29, 1957 (age 69); Munich, West Germany
- Batted: Left Threw: Left

MLB debut
- April 7, 1983, for the Chicago Cubs

Last MLB appearance
- July 3, 1994, for the California Angels

MLB statistics
- Win–loss record: 58–72
- Earned run average: 3.43
- Strikeouts: 719
- Saves: 101
- Stats at Baseball Reference

Teams
- Chicago Cubs (1983); San Diego Padres (1984–1987); San Francisco Giants (1987–1989); San Diego Padres (1990–1992); Baltimore Orioles (1992); Texas Rangers (1993); California Angels (1994)

Craig Lindsay Lefferts (born September 29, 1957) is a German-American former relief pitcher who played in Major League Baseball for the Chicago Cubs, San Diego Padres, San Francisco Giants, Baltimore Orioles, Texas Rangers and California Angels between 1983 and 1994.

== Early life ==
Lefferts was born in West Germany, one of five children of Ed, a United States Air Force officer, and Bobbie Lefferts. Lefferts moved to Sacramento, Japan, Topeka, Cape Cod and San Diego before the family settled in the Tampa Bay area. As a child, Lefferts suffered from asthma, was prone to attacks and his parents did not let him play baseball until he was 12 years old.

Lefferts received a commission to attend the United States Air Force Academy where he planned to become a pilot like his father. However, he failed the pilot physical due to a lack of depth perception and lazy eye. Lefferts' father wrote to his alma mater, the University of Arizona, and asked if his son could walk on to the school's baseball team. Coach Jerry Kindall added Lefferts to the roster but cut him shortly thereafter as he was undersized (at 5 feet 10 inches (1.78 m) and 140 pounds (64 kg)) and did not throw hard. Lefferts eventually worked his way back onto the roster to become one of the team's best pitchers.

Lefferts represented the United States at the 1979 Pan American Games. He graduated from the University of Arizona and was the winning pitcher in the 1980 College World Series title game, leading the Arizona Wildcats to a 5-3 victory over the Hawaii Rainbow Warriors. He was named to the 1980 College World Series all-tournament team. He was then drafted by the Chicago Cubs in the ninth round of the 1980 amateur draft.

== Professional career ==
Lefferts helped the Padres win the 1984 National League pennant and the Giants win the 1987 National League West division title and the 1989 National League pennant. The 83 games he pitched in during 1986 not only led the National League but remains a Padres single season record.

Lefferts was traded from the Padres to the Orioles for Erik Schullstrom on August 31, 1992 in a transaction which was completed four days later on September 4 when Ricky Gutiérrez was sent to San Diego. After going 1–3 with a 4.09 earned run average (ERA) with the Orioles, he elected to become a free agent on November 2, 1992.

In 12 seasons he had a win–loss record of 58–72, 45 games started, 1 complete game, 286 games finished, 101 saves, 1,145 2/3 innings, 1,108 hits allowed, 490 runs allowed, 436 earned runs allowed, 120 home runs allowed, 322 walks allowed, 719 strikeouts, 31 wild pitches, 4,754 batters faced, 55 intentional walks, 10 balks and a 3.43 ERA.

As of 2026, Lefferts is the most recent pitcher to hit a walk-off home run, doing so on April 25, 1986, in the bottom of the 12th inning against the San Francisco Giants' Greg Minton. He will likely be the last pitcher to do so, as MLB permanently implemented a universal designated hitter in 2022. He was the first pitcher to hit a walk-off home run since Moe Drabowsky in 1969.

A few years after retiring as a player, Lefferts became a coach in the Toronto Blue Jays system before joining the Oakland Athletics system in 2001 and, in 2015, became the team's pitching rehab coordinator. Lefferts underwent two failed eye surgeries in retirement which damaged his vision even further.

== Sources ==
- Career statistics from Baseball Reference · Baseball Reference (Minors) · Retrosheet · Baseball Almanac
