= Atlee Hammaker =

American baseball player (born 1958)

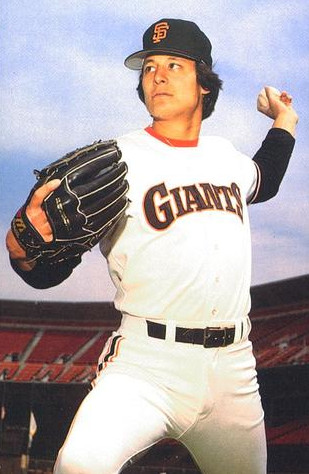
- Pitcher
- Born: January 24, 1958 (age 68); Carmel-by-the-Sea, California, U.S.
- Batted: Switch Threw: Left

MLB debut
- August 13, 1981, for the Kansas City Royals

Last MLB appearance
- August 9, 1995, for the Chicago White Sox

MLB statistics
- Win–loss record: 59–67
- Earned run average: 3.66
- Strikeouts: 615
- Stats at Baseball Reference

Teams
- Kansas City Royals (1981); San Francisco Giants (1982–1985, 1987–1990); San Diego Padres (1990–1991); Chicago White Sox (1994–1995)

Career highlights and awards
- All-Star (1983); NL ERA leader (1983); San Francisco Giants Wall of Fame
Medals
Baseball
Representing the United States
Amateur World Series
| Silver medal – second place | 1978 Italy | Team |

Charlton Atlee Hammaker (/ˈhæməkər/ HAM-ə-kər; born January 24, 1958) is an American former Major League Baseball left-handed pitcher who played the majority of his career for the San Francisco Giants (1982–1990). He also played for the Kansas City Royals, San Diego Padres, and Chicago White Sox. During his twelve-year career, he won 59 games, lost 67 games and netted five saves.

== Early life ==
Hammaker was born in Carmel-by-the-Sea, California, on January 24, 1958, the son of Miyake and Charles Hammaker. A middle child, he has one older brother, Aldine and one younger sister, Charlene. He is half German and half Japanese. Hammaker grew up living in many different locations due to his father's career in the United States Army, and attended Mount Vernon High School in Fairfax County, Virginia, where he played basketball, football, and baseball. After suffering a knee injury in football his sophomore year, he began focusing on basketball.

Hammaker received a full basketball scholarship to East Tennessee State University (ETSU) in Johnson City. After being talked to and convinced by the coaches at ETSU, Hammaker decided to change his focus to baseball. He attended a summer league in Alaska, and from there, was a first-round pick (21st overall) in the 1979 MLB draft by the Kansas City Royals.

== Career ==
In 1983, Hammaker's best season, he led the National League with an ERA of 2.25, a WHIP of 1.039, BB/9IP of 1.67, and strikeout to walk ratio of 3.97. That year Hammaker won 10, lost 9, and made the National League All-Star team. (Through June, his record was 9–3 with an ERA of 1.52.)

=== 1983 All-Star Game ===
Hammaker made the National League All-Star team in 1983, but did not fare well, surrendering seven earned runs in 0.2 inning pitched; and he gave up the only grand slam in All-Star Game history, to Fred Lynn. The American League prevailed 13–3 for their first win in twelve years.

=== 1987 NLCS ===
In Game 7 of the 1987 NLCS, Hammaker, pitching for San Francisco, gave up a three-run homer in the second inning to José Oquendo, a utility infielder who had hit only one home run that season. The Cardinals won 6–0 to advance to the World Series.

=== Religion ===
While with the Giants, Hammaker and teammates Scott Garrelts, Dave Dravecky and Jeff Brantley became known as the "God Squad" because of their strong Christian faith. Forgoing the hard-partying lifestyle of many of their teammates, they preferred to hold Bible studies in their hotel rooms while on the road.

== Personal life ==
Hammaker is married and lives in Knoxville, Tennessee, with his wife. He is the father of five daughters. His second oldest daughter, Jenna Hammaker-Gomes, is married to major league player Yan Gomes.

== See also ==
- List of Major League Baseball annual ERA leaders
