= 1989 Chicago Cubs season =

1989 Chicago Cubs
- National League East champions
- League: National League
- Division: East
- Ballpark: Wrigley Field
- City: Chicago
- Record: 93–69 (.574)
- Divisional place: 1st
- Owners: Tribune Company
- General managers: Jim Frey
- Managers: Don Zimmer
- Television: WGN-TV/Superstation WGN (Harry Caray, Steve Stone, Dewayne Staats)
- Radio: WGN (Dewayne Staats, Dave Nelson, Harry Caray)
- Stats: ESPN.com; Baseball Reference

The 1989 Chicago Cubs season was the 118th season of the franchise, the 114th in the National League and 74th season at Wrigley Field. The Cubs were managed by Don Zimmer in his second season as manager and played their home games at Wrigley Field as members of National League East.

The Cubs stole the National League spotlight during the 1989 season along with their NL West rivals San Francisco Giants. The Cubs had All-Star seasons from Ryne Sandberg, Andre Dawson, Rick Sutcliffe, and closing pitcher Mitch Williams. Williams gave the Cubs a strong stopper in the bullpen in his impressive National League debut while the 1989 NL Rookie of the Year was Chicago's very own Jerome Walton, who proved himself to be a dependable centerfielder.

The Cubs finished the season 93–69 to win the NL East for the second time in franchise history, battling the St. Louis Cardinals into the last week of the season. The Cubs lost the NLCS four games to one to the San Francisco Giants, who proved to be more dominant with a strong hitting presence.

== Offseason ==
- December 5, 1988: Rafael Palmeiro, Jamie Moyer, and Drew Hall were traded by the Cubs to the Texas Rangers in exchange for Paul Kilgus, Mitch Williams, Curtis Wilkerson, Steve Wilson, Luis Benitez (minors), and Pablo Delgado (minors).
- December 7, 1988: Scott Sanderson was signed as a free agent by the Cubs.
- December 8, 1988: Rolando Roomes was traded by the Chicago Cubs to the Cincinnati Reds for Lloyd McClendon.
- March 28, 1989: Rich Gossage was released by the Cubs.

== Regular season ==
=== Season standings ===
NL East
Team	W	L	Pct.	GB	Home	Road
Chicago Cubs	93	69	.574	—	48‍–‍33	45‍–‍36
New York Mets	87	75	.537	6	51‍–‍30	36‍–‍45
St. Louis Cardinals	86	76	.531	7	46‍–‍35	40‍–‍41
Montreal Expos	81	81	.500	12	44‍–‍37	37‍–‍44
Pittsburgh Pirates	74	88	.457	19	39‍–‍42	35‍–‍46
Philadelphia Phillies	67	95	.414	26	38‍–‍42	29‍–‍53

=== Record vs. opponents ===
1989 National League record Sources:
Team	ATL	CHC	CIN	HOU	LAD	MON	NYM	PHI	PIT	SD	SF	STL
Atlanta	—	5–7	8–10	8–10	6–10	6–6	2–10	8–4	4–8	7–11	6–12	3–9
Chicago	7–5	—	7–5	5–7	7–5	10–8	10–8	10–8	12–6	8–4	6–6	11–7
Cincinnati	10–8	5–7	—	8–10	8–10	4–8	4–8	4–8	7–5	9–9	8–10	8–4
Houston	10–8	7–5	10–8	—	10–8	4–8	6–6	9–3	7–5	8–10	8–10	7–5
Los Angeles	10–6	5–7	10–8	8–10	—	7–5	5–7	6–6	7–5	6–12	10–8	3–9
Montreal	6–6	8–10	8–4	8–4	5–7	—	9–9	9–9	11–7	5–7	7–5	5–13
New York	10–2	8–10	8–4	6–6	7–5	9–9	—	12–6	9–9	5–7	3–9	10–8
Philadelphia	4–8	8–10	8–4	3–9	6–6	9–9	6–12	—	10–8	2–10	4–8	7–11
Pittsburgh	8–4	6–12	5–7	5–7	5–7	7–11	9–9	8–10	—	3–9	5–7	13–5
San Diego	11–7	4–8	9–9	10–8	12–6	7–5	7–5	10–2	9–3	—	8–10	2–10
San Francisco	12–6	6–6	10–8	10–8	8–10	5–7	9–3	8–4	7–5	10–8	—	7–5
St. Louis	9–3	7–11	4–8	5–7	9–3	13–5	8–10	11–7	5–13	10–2	5–7	—

=== Notable transactions ===
- August 24, 1989: The Cubs traded players to be named later to the Atlanta Braves for Paul Assenmacher. The Cubs completed the deal by sending Kelly Mann and Pat Gomez to the Braves on September 1.
- August 30, 1989: Calvin Schiraldi, Darrin Jackson and a player to be named later were traded by the Cubs to the San Diego Padres for Marvell Wynne and Luis Salazar. The Cubs completed the deal by sending Phil Stephenson to the Padres on September 5.

== Roster ==
1989 Chicago Cubs
Roster
Pitchers: 45 Paul Assenmacher; 36 Mike Bielecki; 51 Kevin Blankenship; 39 Paul Kilgus; 43 Joe Kraemer; 50 Les Lancaster; 31 Greg Maddux; 37 Pat Perry; 41 Jeff Pico; 21 Scott Sanderson; 32 Calvin Schiraldi; 40 Rick Sutcliffe; 38 Dean Wilkins; 28 Mitch Williams; 44 Steve Wilson	Catchers: 9 Damon Berryhill; 7 Joe Girardi; 1 Rick Wrona; Infielders: 12 Shawon Dunston; 17 Mark Grace; 2 Vance Law; 15 Domingo Ramos; 11 Luis Salazar; 23 Ryne Sandberg; 16 Greg Smith; 19 Curtis Wilkerson	Outfielders: 29 Doug Dascenzo; 8 Andre Dawson; 30 Darrin Jackson; 10 Lloyd McClendon; 18 Dwight Smith; 11 Phil Stephenson; 24 Gary Varsho; 20 Jerome Walton; 33 Mitch Webster; 25 Marvell Wynne	Manager: 4 Don Zimmer; Coaches: 6 Joe Altobelli; 5 Chuck Cottier; 35 Larry Cox; 3 José Martínez; 34 Dick Pole

=== Game log ===
1989 Chicago Cubs regular season game log: 93–69 (.574)
April: 12–11 (.522)

#	Date	Opponent	Score	Win	Loss	Save	Attendance	Record	Other Info
1	April 4	Phillies	5–4	Sutcliffe (1–0)	Youmans (0–1)	Williams (1)	33,361	1–0	
2	April 5	Phillies	12–4	Howell (1–0)	Maddux (0–1)	Maddux (1)	18,674	1–1	
3	April 6	Phillies	8–3	Ontiveros (1–0)	Kilgus (0–1)		6,364	1–2	
4	April 7	Pirates	6–5	Wilson (1–0)	Taylor (0–1)	Williams (2)	6,195	2–2	
5	April 8	Pirates	5–3	Bielecki (1–0)	Heaton (0–1)	Schiraldi (1)	19,374	3–2	
6	April 9	Pirates	8–3	Sutcliffe (2–0)	Walk (0–1)		11,387	4–2	
7	April 11	Cardinals	5–4	Schiraldi (1–0)	DeLeón (1–1)	Williams (3)	7,943	5–2	
8	April 12	Cardinals	3–2	Kilgus (1–1)	Terry (0–1)	Williams (4)	21,187	6–2	
9	April 14	@ Phillies	6–4	Sanderson (1–0)	Ruffin (0–2)	Williams (5)	20,851	7–2	
10	April 16	@ Phillies	5–3	Sutcliffe (3–0)	Youmans (0–2)	Williams (6)	32,249	8–2	
11	April 17	@ Expos	2–1	Gross (2–1)	Maddux (0–2)	Burke (3)	8,847	8–3	
12	April 18	@ Expos	11–2	B. Smith (1–0)	Kilgus (1–2)		11,913	8–4	
13	April 19	@ Expos	3–2	Den. Martinez (1–0)	Sanderson (1–1)	Burke (4)	9,014	8–5	
14	April 20	@ Mets	4–3	Gooden (3–0)	Williams (0–1)	McDowell (1)	28,944	8–6	
15	April 21	@ Mets	8–4	Sutcliffe (4–0)	Ojeda (0–3)	Wilson (1)	34,690	9–6	
16	April 22	@ Mets	3–1	Fernandez (2–0)	Maddux (0–3)	McDowell (2)	41,323	9–7	
17	April 23	@ Mets	4–2	Aguilera (1–0)	Schiraldi (1–1)		40,268	9–8	
18	April 25	Dodgers	4–0	Belcher (2–1)	Sanderson (1–2)		31,876	9–9	
19	April 26	Dodgers	3–1	Morgan (2–1)	Sutcliffe (4–1)	Howell (2)	13,221	9–10	
20	April 27	Dodgers	1–0	Maddux (1–3)	Hershiser (3–2)		12,013	10–10	
21	April 28	Padres	3–1	Kilgus (2–2)	Rasmussen (1–4)	Williams (7)	9,504	11–10	
22	April 29	Padres	5–4	Terrell (3–2)	Bielecki (1–1)	Davis (11)	34,748	11–11	
23	April 30	Padres	7–3	Sanderson (2–2)	Show (4–2)		28,735	12–11	

May: 16–11 (.593)

#	Date	Opponent	Score	Win	Loss	Save	Attendance	Record	Other Info
24	May 1	@ Giants	4–3 (12)	Pico (1–0)	LaCoss (1–2)	Schiraldi (2)	17,914	13–11	
25	May 2	@ Giants	4–0	Reuschel (4–2)	Maddux (1–4)	Gossage (1)	11,128	13–12	
26	May 3	@ Padres	5–4	Kilgus (3–2)	Grant (0–1)	Williams (8)	20,403	14–12	
27	May 4	@ Padres	4–0	Bielecki (2–1)	Terrell (3–3)		25,892	15–12	
28	May 5	@ Dodgers	4–2	Sanderson (3–2)	Belcher (2–3)	Williams (9)	46,767	16–12	
29	May 6	@ Dodgers	3–0	Morgan (3–1)	Sutcliffe (4–2)	Howell (3)	46,389	16–13	
30	May 7	@ Dodgers	4–2	Wilson (2–0)	Hershiser (4–3)	Williams (10)	46,329	17–13	
31	May 9	Giants	4–2	Krukow (2–0)	Kilgus (3–3)	Lefferts (5)	13,949	17–14	
32	May 10	Giants	4–3	LaCoss (2–3)	Williams (0–2)	Lefferts (6)	25,638	17–15	
33	May 12	Astros	3–1	Deshaies (5–2)	Sutcliffe (4–3)		21,141	17–16	
34	May 13	Astros	1–0	Knepper (2–5)	Maddux (1–5)	Smith (6)	27,775	17–17	
35	May 14	Astros	5–1	Scott (5–2)	Kilgus (3–4)		23,391	17–18	
36	May 15	Braves	4–0	Bielecki (3–1)	Lilliquist (2–3)		16,920	18–18	
37	May 16	Braves	4–3	Sanderson (4–2)	Glavine (5–1)	Williams (11)	24,070	19–18	
38	May 17	Braves	4–0	Pico (2–0)	Z. Smith (1–6)		31,196	20–18	
39	May 19	@ Reds	8–2	Maddux (2–5)	Jackson (2–7)		29,202	21–18	
40	May 20	@ Reds	7–3	Kilgus (4–4)	Browning (3–4)	Perry (1)	49,175	22–18	
41	May 21	@ Reds	7–2	Mahler (6–4)	Bielecki (3–2)		34,128	22–19	
42	May 22	@ Astros	5–3	Sutcliffe (5–3)	Deshaies (5–3)	Schiraldi (3)	11,923	23–19	
43	May 23	@ Astros	5–4	Sanderson (5–2)	Scott (6–3)	Schiraldi (4)	15,665	24–19	
44	May 24	@ Astros	3–1	Maddux (3–5)	Knepper (2–6)	Williams (12)	17,042	25–19	
45	May 26	Reds	10–8 (12)	Dibble (4–1)	Schiraldi (1–2)		33,583	25–20	
46	May 27	Reds	5–3	Sutcliffe (6–3)	Rijo (4–1)		34,546	26–20	
47	May 28	Reds	6–1	Bielecki (4–2)	Jackson (3–8)		37,231	27–20	
48	May 29	@ Braves	2–1	Lilliquist (3–3)	Sanderson (5–3)	Boever (7)	15,123	27–21	
49	May 30	@ Braves	3–2	Maddux (4–5)	P. Smith (1–7)	Williams (13)	7,566	28–21	
50	May 31	@ Braves	3–2	Smoltz (7–3)	Kilgus (4–5)	Boever (8)	7,958	28–22	

June: 13–15 (.464)

#	Date	Opponent	Score	Win	Loss	Save	Attendance	Record	Other Info
51	June 2	@ Cardinals	5–2	Sutcliffe (7–3)	Magrane (3–4)	Williams (14)	46,448	29–22	
52	June 3	@ Cardinals	6–5 (10)	Quisenberry (2–1)	Schiraldi (1–3)		44,719	29–23	
53	June 4	@ Cardinals	11–3	Sanderson (6–3)	Terry (4–5)		45,659	30–23	
54	June 5	Mets	15–3	Maddux (5–5)	Cone (3–5)		34,840	31–23	
55	June 6	Mets	8–4	Kilgus (5–5)	Ojeda (2–6)		33,558	32–23	
56	June 7	Mets	10–5	Gooden (7–2)	Sutcliffe (7–4)	Aguilera (4)	35,372	32–24	
57	June 8	Mets	5–4 (10)	Williams (1–2)	Aase (1–2)		36,358	33–24	
58	June 9	Cardinals	1–0	DeLeón (8–3)	Sanderson (6–4)	Worrell (7)	34,937	33–25	
59	June 10	Cardinals	6–0	Magrane (4–5)	Maddux (5–6)		38,045	33–26	
60	June 11	Cardinals	10–7	Carpenter (2–4)	Schiraldi (1–4)		35,450	33–27	
61	June 12	Cardinals	10–3	Wilson (3–0)	Terry (4–6)		27,154	34–27	
62	June 13	@ Mets	4–2	Bielecki (5–2)	Darling (4–5)	Williams (15)	26,664	35–27	
63	June 14	@ Mets	2–0 (7)	Gooden (8–2)	Sanderson (6–5)	Aguilera (5)	27,278	35–28	
64	June 15	@ Mets	4–3 (12)	Aguilera (3–1)	Perry (0–1)		24,689	35–29	
65	June 16	@ Expos	8–5	B. Smith (7–2)	Kilgus (5–6)	Burke (14)	26,264	35–30	
66	June 17	@ Expos	3–2	Sutcliffe (8–4)	Pérez (3–8)	Williams (16)	35,095	36–30	
67	June 18	@ Expos	5–4	Bielecki (6–2)	Langston (2–2)	Williams (17)	35,968	37–30	
68	June 20	@ Pirates	5–4 (11)	Schiraldi (2–4)	Garcia (0–1)	Kilgus (1)	11,713	38–30	
69	June 21	@ Pirates	1–0 (11)	Maddux (6–6)	Bair (0–1)	Williams (18)	23,970	39–30	
70	June 22	@ Pirates	8–0	Sutcliffe (9–4)	Kramer (1–4)		16,430	40–30	
71	June 23	Expos	5–1	Langston (3–2)	Bielecki (6–3)	Burke (15)	36,239	40–31	
72	June 24	Expos	5–0	Gross (7–6)	Kilgus (5–7)		36,068	40–32	
73	June 25	Expos	5–0	Den. Martinez (7–1)	Sanderson (6–6)		34,491	40–33	
74	June 26	Pirates	2–1	Drabek (5–5)	Maddux (6–7)		35,407	40–34	
75	June 27	Pirates	5–4	Kramer (2–4)	Sutcliffe (9–5)	Landrum (7)	35,646	40–35	
76	June 28	Pirates	3–1	Robinson (4–6)	Bielecki (6–4)	Landrum (8)	34,114	40–36	
77	June 29	@ Giants	12–2	Brantley (1–0)	Kilgus (5–8)		12,339	40–37	
78	June 30	@ Giants	6–4	Sanderson (7–6)	Wilson (0–1)	Williams (19)	49,241	41–37	

July: 18–9 (.667)

#	Date	Opponent	Score	Win	Loss	Save	Attendance	Record	Other Info
79	July 1	@ Giants	3–2	Maddux (7–7)	Reuschel (12–3)	Williams (20)	29,019	42–37	
80	July 2	@ Giants	4–3	Brantley (2–0)	Sutcliffe (9–6)	Bedrosian (12)	41,350	42–38	
81	July 4	Padres	5–1	Bielecki (7–4)	Whitson (10–6)	Wilson (2)	32,920	43–38	
82	July 5	Padres	5–3	Sanderson (8–6)	Rasmussen (3–6)	Kilgus (2)	33,464	44–38	
83	July 6	Padres	7–3	Maddux (8–7)	Terrell (4–12)	Williams (21)	34,814	45–38	
84	July 7	Dodgers	6–4	Sutcliffe (10–6)	Wetteland (2–2)	Williams (22)	35,434	46–38	
85	July 8	Dodgers	8–2	Morgan (6–8)	Pico (2–1)		37,096	46–39	
86	July 9	Dodgers	11–4	Bielecki (8–4)	Valenzuela (4–8)		35,533	47–39	
87	July 13	@ Padres	7–3	Maddux (9–7)	Hurst (7–7)	Lancaster (1)	23,481	48–39	
88	July 14	@ Padres	7–4	Whitson (12–6)	Bielecki (8–5)	Davis (23)	27,649	48–40	
89	July 15	@ Padres	3–2	Terrell (5–12)	Kilgus (5–9)		54,717	48–41	
90	July 16	@ Padres	4–3	Rasmussen (4–6)	Sutcliffe (10–7)	Davis (24)	30,549	48–42	
91	July 17	@ Dodgers	6–3	Lancaster (1–0)	Leary (6–7)	Williams (23)	39,914	49–42	
92	July 18	@ Dodgers	4–1	Hershiser (11–7)	Maddux (9–8)		37,543	49–43	
93	July 19	@ Dodgers	4–0	Bielecki (9–5)	Morgan (6–10)		40,050	50–43	
94	July 20	Giants	4–3 (11)	Lancaster (2–0)	McCament (1–1)		32,306	51–43	
95	July 21	Giants	4–3	Garrelts (8–3)	Sutcliffe (10–8)	Lefferts (17)	34,725	51–44	
96	July 22	Giants	5–2	Sanderson (9–6)	Hammaker (6–5)	Lancaster (2)	35,530	52–44	
97	July 23	Giants	9–5	Maddux (10–8)	Robinson (8–7)		35,707	53–44	
98	July 24	@ Cardinals	3–2	Bielecki (10–5)	Terry (7–9)	Williams (24)	45,183	54–44	
99	July 25	@ Cardinals	4–2	Kilgus (6–9)	Magrane (11–7)	Williams (25)	46,621	55–44	
100	July 26	@ Cardinals	2–0	DeLeón (10–9)	Sutcliffe (10–9)	Worrell (13)	43,000	55–45	
101	July 28	Mets	6–5	Schiraldi (3–4)	Aguilera (6–5)	Williams (26)	37,554	56–45	
102	July 29	Mets	10–3	Maddux (11–8)	Whitehurst (0–1)		38,012	57–45	
103	July 30	Mets	6–4	Lancaster (3–0)	Aguilera (6–6)		36,837	58–45	
104	July 31	@ Phillies	10–2	Sutcliffe (11–9)	Mulholland (1–5)			59–45	
105	July 31	@ Phillies	7–4	Carman (3–11)	Kilgus (6–10)	Parrett (4)	22,160	59–46	

August: 16–12 (.571)

#	Date	Opponent	Score	Win	Loss	Save	Attendance	Record	Other Info
106	August 1	@ Phillies	4–1	Wilson (4–0)	McWilliams (2–11)	Williams (27)	23,614	60–46	
107	August 2	@ Phillies	6–0	Howell (9–7)	Sanderson (9–7)		21,688	60–47	
108	August 3	@ Phillies	2–0	Maddux (12–8)	Ruffin (3–5)	Lancaster (3)	21,983	61–47	
109	August 4	@ Pirates	3–2	Bielecki (11–5)	Drabek (8–8)	Williams (28)	29,169	62–47	
110	August 5	@ Pirates	4–2	Wilson (5–0)	Landrum (2–2)	Lancaster (4)	23,262	63–47	
111	August 6	@ Pirates	5–4 (18)	Drabek (9–8)	Sanderson (9–8)		24,716	63–48	
112	August 7	Expos	5–2	Maddux (13–8)	Pérez (6–11)		39,002	64–48	
113	August 8	Expos	4–2	Bielecki (12–5)	Den. Martinez (12–2)	Lancaster (5)	38,126	65–48	
114	August 9	Expos	3–0	Sutcliffe (12–9)	B. Smith (9–6)	Williams (29)	39,009	66–48	
115	August 10	Phillies	16–13	Parrett (9–4)	Wilson (5–1)		36,745	66–49	
116	August 11	Phillies	9–2	Maddux (14–8)	Carman (3–12)		36,440	67–49	
117	August 12	Phillies	9–7	Bielecki (13–5)	Howell (9–8)	Williams (30)	37,752	68–49	
118	August 13	Phillies	5–3	Parrett (10–4)	Wilson (5–2)		37,054	68–50	
119	August 15	@ Reds	5–2 (12)	Williams (2–2)	Roesler (0–1)		31,694	69–50	
120	August 16	@ Reds	5–1	Bielecki (14–5)	Leary (8–10)		29,764	70–50	
121	August 17	@ Reds	3–2	Sutcliffe (13–9)	Franco (3–6)	Williams (31)	29,278	71–50	
122	August 18	@ Astros	6–5	Smith (3–3)	Schiraldi (3–5)		31,987	71–51	
123	August 19	@ Astros	8–4	Portugal (3–1)	Maddux (14–9)		41,661	71–52	
124	August 20	@ Astros	8–4	Darwin (11–3)	Lancaster (3–1)		38,624	71–53	
125	August 21	Reds	6–5 (10)	Charlton (6–1)	Schiraldi (3–6)	Franco (26)	37,626	71–54	
126	August 22	Reds	7–2	Browning (13–10)	Kraemer (0–1)		35,179	71–55	
127	August 23	Reds	8–5	Scudder (3–5)	Maddux (14–10)		33,054	71–56	
128	August 25	Braves	4–3 (12)	Williams (3–2)	Eichhorn (4–4)		35,456	72–56	
129	August 26	Braves	5–3	Valdez (1–2)	Sutcliffe (13–10)	Boever (21)	35,752	72–57	
130	August 27	Braves	3–2 (10)	Williams (4–2)	Eichhorn (4–5)		35,107	73–57	
131	August 28	Astros	6–1	Maddux (15–10)	Cano (0–1)		23,039	74–57	
132	August 29	Astros	10–9 (10)	Assenmacher (2–3)	Smith (3–4)		25,829	75–57	Cubs come back from 9–0 deficit
133	August 30	Astros	8–4	Scott (18–7)	Sutcliffe (13–11)		37,218	75–58	

September: 17–11 (.607)

#	Date	Opponent	Score	Win	Loss	Save	Attendance	Record	Other Info
134	September 1	@ Braves	5–1	Lilliquist (8–8)	Wilson (5–3)	Stanton (2)	14,255	75–59	
135	September 2	@ Braves	10–3	Maddux (16–10)	Clary (4–3)		41,020	76–59	
136	September 3	@ Braves	8–5	P. Smith (5–13)	Bielecki (14–6)	Stanton (3)	25,189	76–60	
137	September 4	@ Mets	7–3	Sutcliffe (14–11)	Cone (12–7)	Lancaster (6)	46,049	77–60	
138	September 5	@ Mets	3–2	Fernandez (11–3)	Williams (4–3)		39,352	77–61	
139	September 6	@ Phillies	9–1	Ruffin (5–8)	Maddux (16–11)		17,272	77–62	
140	September 7	@ Phillies	6–2	Bielecki (15–6)	Howell (11–11)		13,058	78–62	
141	September 8	Cardinals	11–8	Carpenter (3–4)	Williams (4–4)	Quisenberry (6)	35,231	78–63	
142	September 9	Cardinals	3–2 (10)	Assenmacher (3–3)	Dayley (3–2)		37,633	79–63	
143	September 10	Cardinals	4–1	Sanderson (10–8)	Hill (7–12)	Williams (32)	37,281	80–63	
144	September 11	Expos	4–3	Maddux (17–11)	Langston (11–7)	Williams (33)	29,190	81–63	
145	September 12	Expos	2–0	Bielecki (16–6)	B. Smith (10–9)		36,333	82–63	
146	September 13	Expos	3–1	Sanderson (11–8)	Gross (11–11)	Lancaster (7)	34,870	83–63	
147	September 15	@ Pirates	7–2	Sutcliffe (15–11)	Belinda (0–1)		12,607	84–63	
148	September 16	@ Pirates	8–6	Smiley (12–7)	Maddux (17–12)		15,668	84–64	
149	September 17	@ Pirates	2–0	Drabek (13–11)	Bielecki (16–7)		21,081	84–65	
150	September 18	Mets	10–6	Wilkins (1–0)	Viola (3–5)	Williams (34)	38,138	85–65	
151	September 19	Mets	5–2	Ojeda (13–10)	Wilson (5–4)	Gooden (1)	35,937	85–66	
152	September 20	Phillies	9–8	Carman (5–15)	Lancaster (3–2)	McDowell (19)	21,620	85–67	
153	September 21	Phillies	9–1	Maddux (18–12)	Mulholland (4–7)		22,885	86–67	
154	September 22	Pirates	4–2	Bielecki (17–7)	Drabek (13–12)	Williams (35)	34,040	87–67	
155	September 23	Pirates	3–2	Lancaster (4–2)	Bair (2–3)		36,849	88–67	
156	September 24	Pirates	4–2	Wilson (6–4)	Robinson (7–12)	Pico (1)	37,904	89–67	
157	September 25	@ Expos	4–3 (10)	Burke (9–3)	Sanderson (11–9)		10,305	89–68	
158	September 26	@ Expos	3–2	Maddux (19–12)	Den. Martinez (16–7)	Williams (36)	11,615	90–68	Cubs clinch NL East title
159	September 27	@ Expos	7–2	Bielecki (18–7)	Thompson (0–2)	Pico (2)	12,442	91–68	
160	September 29	@ Cardinals	7–5	Dayley (4–3)	Assenmacher (3–4)	Terry (2)	41,599	91–69	
161	September 30	@ Cardinals	6–4	Pico (3–1)	Costello (5–4)	Lancaster (8)	43,570	92–69	

October: 1–0 (1.000)

#	Date	Opponent	Score	Win	Loss	Save	Attendance	Record	Other Info
162	October 1	@ Cardinals	5–1	Sutcliffe (16–11)	Hill (7–15)		37,846	93–69	

== Player stats ==
=== Batting ===
==== Starters by position ====
Note: Pos = Position; G = Games played; AB = At bats; H = Hits; Avg. = Batting average; HR = Home runs; RBI = Runs batted in

Pos	Player	G	AB	H	Avg.	HR	RBI
C	Damon Berryhill	91	334	86	.257	5	41
1B	Mark Grace	142	510	160	.314	13	79
2B	Ryne Sandberg	157	606	176	.290	30	76
3B	Vance Law	130	408	96	.235	7	42
SS	Shawon Dunston	138	471	131	.278	9	60
LF	Dwight Smith	109	343	111	.324	9	52
CF	Jerome Walton	116	475	139	.293	5	46
RF	Andre Dawson	118	416	105	.252	21	77

==== Other batters ====
Note: G = Games played; AB = At bats; H = Hits; Avg. = Batting average; HR = Home runs; RBI = Runs batted in

Player	G	AB	H	Avg.	HR	RBI
Mitch Webster	98	272	70	.257	3	19
Lloyd McClendon	92	259	74	.286	12	40
Domingo Ramos	85	179	47	.263	1	19
Curt Wilkerson	77	160	39	.244	1	10
Joe Girardi	59	157	39	.248	1	14
Doug Dascenzo	47	139	23	.165	1	12
Rick Wrona	38	92	26	.283	2	14
Gary Varsho	61	87	16	.184	0	6
Darrin Jackson	45	83	19	.229	1	8
Luis Salazar	26	80	26	.325	1	12
Marvell Wynne	20	48	9	.188	1	4
Phil Stephenson	17	21	3	.143	0	0
Greg Smith	4	5	2	.400	0	2

=== Pitching ===
==== Starting pitchers ====
Note: G = Games pitched; IP = Innings pitched; W = Wins; L = Losses; ERA = Earned run average; SO = Strikeouts

Player	G	IP	W	L	ERA	SO
Greg Maddux	35	238.0	19	12	2.95	135
Rick Sutcliffe	35	229.0	16	11	3.66	153
Mike Bielecki	33	212.1	18	7	3.14	147
Joe Kraemer	1	3.2	0	1	4.91	5

==== Other pitchers ====
Note: G = Games pitched; IP = Innings pitched; W = Wins; L = Losses; ERA = Earned run average; SO = Strikeouts

Player	G	IP	W	L	ERA	SO
Scott Sanderson	37	146.0	11	9	3.94	86
Paul Kilgus	35	145.2	6	10	4.39	61
Jeff Pico	53	90.2	3	1	3.77	38
Steve Wilson	53	85.2	6	4	4.20	65

==== Relief pitchers ====
Note: G = Games pitched; W = Wins; L = Losses; SV = Saves; ERA = Earned run average; SO = Strikeouts

Player	G	W	L	SV	ERA	SO
Mitch Williams	76	4	4	36	2.76	67
Calvin Schiraldi	54	3	6	4	3.78	54
Les Lancaster	42	4	2	8	1.36	56
Pat Perry	19	0	1	1	1.77	20
Paul Assenmacher	14	2	1	0	5.21	15
Dean Wilkins	11	1	0	0	4.60	14
Kevin Blankenship	2	0	0	0	1.69	2

== NLCS ==
=== Game 1 ===
October 4 at Wrigley Field in Chicago

Team	1	2	3	4	5	6	7	8	9	R	H	E
San Francisco	3	0	1	4	0	0	0	3	0	11	13	0
Chicago	2	0	1	0	0	0	0	0	0	3	8	1
W: Scott Garrelts (1–0) L: Greg Maddux (0–1) S: None
HR: SF – Will Clark (1), (2), Kevin Mitchell (1) CHC – Mark Grace (1), Ryne Sandberg (1)
Pitchers: SF – Garrelts, Brantley (8), Hammaker (9) CHC – Maddux, Kilgus (5), Wilson (8)
Attendance: 39,195

=== Game 2 ===
October 5 at Wrigley Field in Chicago

Team	1	2	3	4	5	6	7	8	9	R	H	E
San Francisco	0	0	0	2	0	0	0	2	1	5	10	0
Chicago	6	0	0	0	0	3	0	0	X	9	11	0
W: Les Lancaster (1–0) L: Rick Reuschel (0–1) S: None
HR: SF – Kevin Mitchell (2), Matt Williams (1), Robby Thompson (1) CHC – None
Pitchers: SF – Reuschel, Downs (1), Lefferts (6), Brantley (7), Bedrosian (8) CHC – Bielecki, Assenmacher (5), Lancaster (6)
Attendance: 39,195

=== Game 3 ===
October 7 at Candlestick Park in San Francisco

Team	1	2	3	4	5	6	7	8	9	R	H	E
Chicago	2	0	0	1	0	0	1	0	0	4	10	0
San Francisco	3	0	0	0	0	0	2	0	X	5	8	3
W: Don Robinson (1–0) L: Les Lancaster (1–1) S: Steve Bedrosian (1)
HR: CHC – None SF – Robby Thompson (2)
Pitchers: CHC – Sutcliffe, Assenmacher (7), Lancaster (7) SF – LaCoss, Brantley (4), Robinson (7), Lefferts (8), Bedrosian (9)
Attendance: 62,065

=== Game 4 ===
October 8 at Candlestick Park in San Francisco

Team	1	2	3	4	5	6	7	8	9	R	H	E
Chicago	1	1	0	0	2	0	0	0	0	4	12	1
San Francisco	1	0	2	1	2	0	0	0	X	6	9	1
W: Kelly Downs (1–0) L: Steve Wilson (1–1) S: Steve Bedrosian (2)
HR: CHC – Luis Salazar (1) SF – Matt Williams (2)
Pitchers: CHC – Maddux, Wilson (4), Sanderson (6), Williams (8) SF – Garrelts, Downs (5), Bedrosian (9)
Attendance: 62,078

=== Game 5 ===
October 9 at Candlestick Park in San Francisco

Team	1	2	3	4	5	6	7	8	9	R	H	E
Chicago	0	0	1	0	0	0	0	0	1	2	10	1
San Francisco	0	0	0	0	0	0	1	2	X	3	4	1
W: Rick Reuschel (1–1) L: Mike Bielecki (0–1) S: Steve Bedrosian (3)
HR: CHC – None SF – None
Pitchers: CHC – Bielecki, Williams (8), Lancaster (8) SF – Reuschel, Bedrosian (9)
Attendance: 62,084

The Giants made it to their first World Series since 1962 with a 3–2 win over the Cubs to win the 1989 National League pennant, four games to one. The final game pitted Mike Bielecki against a well-rested (due to his quick exit from Game 2) Rick Reuschel. Reuschel made amends for his poor start in Game 2 by giving up only one run over eight innings. The one run Reuschel gave up was an unearned run the Cubs scored when Walton reached on an error by Mitchell and then scored on Sandberg's double. The Cubs held the 1–0 lead until the seventh inning when Will Clark tripled and scored on Mitchell's sacrifice fly.

The Cubs did rally, however, in the ninth with three straight singles that made it 3–2. But Sandberg grounded out sending the Giants to their first World Series since 1962.

== Awards and honors ==
- Ryne Sandberg, National League Leader, Runs (104)

All-Star Game

- Ryne Sandberg, second base, starter
- Andre Dawson, outfield, reserve
- Rick Sutcliffe, pitcher, reserve
- Mitch Williams, relief pitcher, reserve

== Farm system ==
Level	Team	League	Manager
AAA	Iowa Cubs	American Association	Pete Mackanin
AA	Charlotte Knights	Southern League	Jim Essian
A	Winston-Salem Spirits	Carolina League	Jay Loviglio
A	Peoria Chiefs	Midwest League	Brad Mills
A	Charleston Wheelers	South Atlantic League	Greg Mahlberg
A-Short Season	Geneva Cubs	New York–Penn League	Bill Hayes
Rookie	Wytheville Cubs	Appalachian League	Steve Roadcap
