= Marvell Wynne =

Marvell Wynne may refer to:

- Marvell Wynne (baseball) (born 1959), American baseball player
- Marvell Wynne (soccer) (born 1986), American soccer player and coach
