= 1989 National League Championship Series =

21st edition of Major League Baseball's National League Championship Series

Team (Wins)	Managers	Season
San Francisco Giants (4)	Roger Craig	92–70, .568, GA: 3
Chicago Cubs (1)	Don Zimmer	93–69, .574, GA: 6
- Dates: October 4–9
- MVP: Will Clark (San Francisco)
- Umpires: Doug Harvey; Bruce Froemming; Terry Tata; Jim Quick; Charlie Williams; Randy Marsh

Broadcast
- Television: NBC
- TV announcers: Vin Scully (Game 1, 3–5), Bob Costas (Game 2) and Tom Seaver
- Radio: CBS
- Radio announcers: John Rooney and Jerry Coleman

The 1989 National League Championship Series was a best-of-seven playoff series in Major League Baseball's 1989 postseason played between the National League West champion San Francisco Giants and the National League East champion Chicago Cubs. The Giants won the series four games to one, en route to losing to the Oakland Athletics in four games in the 1989 World Series.

== Background ==
This was the first official postseason match-up between to Cubs and Giants, but the two historic franchises had a history dating back to as far as the 1900s. Considered the first true rivalry in MLB, there were nine first-second finishes, eight second-third finishes, and 30 out of a possible 65 championships in the league's first six decades before both franchises experienced mediocrity in the 1940s. The most notorious point of the rivalry came in 1908 when Fred Merkle's baserunning mistake helped the Cubs win the 1908 national league pennant over the then-New York Giants, which was also the Cubs last World Series victory at this time.

This was the Cubs' and Giants' second NLCS in the 1980s, with both teams losing in heartbreak fashion in their first. The Cubs were defeated by the San Diego Padres in 1984 after being up in the series 2–0 in the last best-of-five game series before MLB changed to a seven-game format in 1985. The Giants lost to the St. Louis Cardinals in 1987 in seven games after being up 3–2 in the series; notable for not scoring a single run in the final two games.

Lastly, both franchises had experienced long title droughts. The Cubs had not won since the aforementioned 1908 World Series and had not been to a World Series since 1945, where the supposed Curse of the Billy Goat originated. The Giants had a curse of their own, the Curse of Coogan's Bluff, which had believed to been put on the team when the Giants relocated from New York to San Francisco after the 1957 season. The Giants had not won a World Series in San Francisco, last winning one in 1954.

== Summary ==
=== Chicago Cubs vs. San Francisco Giants ===
San Francisco won the series, 4–1.

Game	Date	Score	Location	Time	Attendance
1	October 4	San Francisco Giants – 11, Chicago Cubs – 3	Wrigley Field	2:51	39,195
2	October 5	San Francisco Giants – 5, Chicago Cubs – 9	Wrigley Field	3:08	39,195
3	October 7	Chicago Cubs – 4, San Francisco Giants – 5	Candlestick Park	2:48	62,065
4	October 8	Chicago Cubs – 4, San Francisco Giants – 6	Candlestick Park	3:13	62,078
5	October 9	Chicago Cubs – 2, San Francisco Giants – 3	Candlestick Park	2:47	62,084

== Game summaries ==
=== Game 1 ===
Wednesday, October 4, 1989, at Wrigley Field in Chicago, Illinois

Team	1	2	3	4	5	6	7	8	9	R	H	E
San Francisco	3	0	1	4	0	0	0	3	0	11	13	0
Chicago	2	0	1	0	0	0	0	0	0	3	10	1
WP: Scott Garrelts (1–0) LP: Greg Maddux (0–1); Home runs: SF: Will Clark 2 (2), Kevin Mitchell (1); CHC: Mark Grace (1), Ryne Sandberg (1)

The Giants entered the series as slight favorites due to the MVP season of Kevin Mitchell, the solid play of Will Clark, and the best ERA in baseball by pitcher Scott Garrelts. The Cubs had won their second NL East title in six seasons behind the excellent rookie performances of Jerome Walton and Dwight Smith, who finished one-two in the 1989 NL Rookie of the Year balloting. The Cubs also had three pitchers with 16 or more victories, Rick Sutcliffe, Mike Bielecki, and Greg Maddux, coming off his third full season in the majors. The opener pitted Maddux against Garrelts.

By the time the Cubs came to bat, the Giants had a 3–0 lead. Brett Butler led off with a single and moved to third on Rick Wrona's passed ball. Clark drove in his first run of the series with a double. Clark moved to third on Mitchell's single and scored along with Mitchell on Matt Williams' double. Maddux had given up three runs and recorded only one out, but he retired Terry Kennedy and Pat Sheridan to end the first. The Cubs came right back in the bottom of the first. Ryne Sandberg doubled and Mark Grace drilled a two-out, two-run homer to cut the Giants lead to 3–2. Clark got a run back when he homered in the third, but Sandberg's solo homer cut the Giants lead back to one. With the score 4–3, the Giants came to bat against Maddux in the fourth.

Pat Sheridan and José Uribe singled, and Uribe's steal put runners at second and third. Garrelts struck out, and the Cubs walked Butler intentionally hoping for a double play. Robby Thompson popped to shortstop, and the infield fly rule resulted in an automatic out. This set the stage for Clark with the bases loaded and two out. Having already driven in two runs, Clark tied the NLCS record for RBIs for an entire series in less than four innings when he drilled a grand slam to right that finished Maddux and the Cubs. The 8–3 lead ended in an 11–3 Giants victory when Mitchell nailed a three-run homer to close the scoring in the eighth. The Giants had drawn first blood and taken back home-field advantage.

Legend has it that Clark read Greg Maddux's lips during the mound visit before the grand slam, and that helped Clark pound a high fastball over the wall for a grand slam that helped the Giants steal Game 1 in Wrigley. Although, Clark's teammate, Bob Brenly, expressed doubts about the truth of that story. Postgame, Cubs' manager Don Zimmer summed up Clark's brilliant outing by saying, "He [Clark] had a helluva week tonight."

=== Game 2 ===
Thursday, October 5, 1989, at Wrigley Field in Chicago, Illinois

Team	1	2	3	4	5	6	7	8	9	R	H	E
San Francisco	0	0	0	2	0	0	0	2	1	5	10	0
Chicago	6	0	0	0	0	3	0	0	X	9	11	0
WP: Les Lancaster (1–0) LP: Rick Reuschel (0–1); Home runs: SF: Kevin Mitchell (2), Matt Williams (1), Robby Thompson (1); CHC: None

Giving the Giants a dose of their own Game 1 medicine, the Cubs ended Game 2 early with a six-run first inning, five of the runs coming against Giants starter and loser Rick Reuschel. After Mike Bielecki picked Butler off first and retired the side, the Cubs went to work. Jerome Walton singled and scored on Ryne Sandberg's triple. After Dwight Smith lined out to first, Mark Grace doubled Sandberg home. Reuschel struck out Andre Dawson, but Luis Salazar singled to score Grace and moved to second on a single by Shawon Dunston. The Giants walked Joe Girardi to get to the pitcher's spot, and Bielecki responded with a single that scored Salazar and Dunston to make it 5–0. Walton again singled, scoring Girardi, and when Kelly Downs retired Sandberg on a pop-up, the Cubs went back into the field with a 6–0 lead.

The game was essentially over after the first inning. The Giants cut the lead to 6–2 in the fourth when Will Clark singled and Kevin Mitchell homered for the second time in the series. But the Cubs got those runs plus another back in the sixth when Grace doubled with the bases loaded, scoring all three runners and giving the Cubs a 9–2 lead. The Giants got three cosmetic runs when Williams homered in the eighth and Robby Thompson homered in the ninth. But the Cubs' early scoring made it one game apiece as the series headed to San Francisco for Game 3. Les Lancaster got the win for the Cubs.

=== Game 3 ===
Saturday, October 7, 1989, at Candlestick Park in San Francisco, California

Team	1	2	3	4	5	6	7	8	9	R	H	E
Chicago	2	0	0	1	0	0	1	0	0	4	10	0
San Francisco	3	0	0	0	0	0	2	0	X	5	8	3
WP: Don Robinson (1–0) LP: Les Lancaster (1–1) Sv: Steve Bedrosian (1); Home runs: CHC: None; SF: Robby Thompson (2)

Tied at one apiece, the series converged on Candlestick Park for Game 3. The pitching match-up featured 16-game winner Rick Sutcliffe against Mike LaCoss. Neither pitcher would be involved in the decision.

Following the trend of the first two games—five runs by the two teams combined in the first inning of Game 1 and six in the first inning of Game 2—the Cubs roared out of the gate with two first-inning runs courtesy of back-to-back singles by Walton and Smith, a wild pitch by LaCoss that put them on second and third, and a single by Andre Dawson that scored both and put the Cubs in the lead, 2–0. The Giants answered with three in their half of the first. Butler and Thompson singled, and Will Clark's fielder's choice ground out moved the runners to second and third. Kevin Mitchell was given an intentional pass, and Matt Williams grounded out to the pitcher to score Butler. Two more walks gave the Giants a second run when Thompson scored, and Jose Uribe's infield single scored Mitchell. The Giants now led, 3–2, but Sutcliffe avoided further damage by getting LaCoss to pop up.

The Cubs tied it in the fourth, but they settled for one run with a chance to open up the game. They loaded the bases against LaCoss with nobody out, and Roger Craig summoned reliever Jeff Brantley. Brantley got Sutcliffe to hit into a double play, including a force on Salazar at the plate. With runners at second and third and two out, the Giants nearly escaped, but a wild pitch from Brantley scored Dunston and tied the game. Walton flied out to end the inning.

The Cubs regained the lead in the seventh when Sutcliffe doubled and went to third on Walton's bunt. Greg Maddux was sent in to pinch-run for Sutcliffe, and he scored on Ryne Sandberg's fly to center. Dwight Smith popped out, but the Cubs led, 4–3.

The Giants, however, came back to put the game away in the bottom of the seventh. Les Lancaster took the mound to face the Giants. He was the winning pitcher in Game 2, but he gave up a home run to Robby Thompson. Lancaster inherited Brett Butler at first and his first hitter was Thompson. Moments later, Thompson had his second home run in his last two at-bats against Lancaster, and the Giants had a 5–4 lead. Don Robinson got the win in relief, Steve Bedrosian got the save, and the Giants had a 2–1 series lead.

=== Game 4 ===
Sunday, October 8, 1989, at Candlestick Park in San Francisco, California

Team	1	2	3	4	5	6	7	8	9	R	H	E
Chicago	1	1	0	0	2	0	0	0	0	4	12	1
San Francisco	1	0	2	1	2	0	0	0	X	6	9	1
WP: Kelly Downs (1–0) LP: Steve Wilson (0–1) Sv: Steve Bedrosian (2); Home runs: CHC: Luis Salazar (1); SF: Matt Williams (2)

In keeping with the first three games, the scoring began early in Game 4 as the Cubs sought to tie the series and the Giants hoped to take a 3–1 lead in the series. The pitching match-up featured a rematch of first-game pitchers Scott Garrelts and Greg Maddux. Garrelts had triumphed in round one, but neither pitcher would be involved in the decision in the rematch.

The Cubs opened the first playing small ball. A double by Sandberg followed by a short single by Smith and a line out to right by Mark Grace scored Sandberg to give the Cubs a 1–0 lead. The Giants mimicked the Cubs in the bottom of the first when Thompson walked, went to third on a Clark single, and scored on a Kevin Mitchell ground out. Luis Salazar then stunned the Giants faithful with a homer to give the Cubs a 2–1 lead in the second. But a bases-loaded single by Matt Williams in the bottom of the third scored two runs and put the Giants back in front. José Uribe doubled in the fourth. Maddux seemingly had him picked off, but a throwing error put Uribe at third, and he scored on Maddux's wild pitch to make it 4–2 Giants. In the top of the fifth, Walton singled and scored on Grace's triple. Grace then scored on Dawson's double and the score was tied at four. But in the bottom of the fifth, Clark doubled and Matt Williams (after fouling off seven pitches in a 12-pitch at-bat) hit his second homer of the series to give the Giants a 6–4 lead that was the final score.

The Giants' win gave them a three games to one edge and a chance to finish the series the next day at home. Kelly Downs won the game in relief, and Steve Bedrosian got his second save in as many days.

=== Game 5 ===
Monday, October 9, 1989, at Candlestick Park in San Francisco, California

Team	1	2	3	4	5	6	7	8	9	R	H	E
Chicago	0	0	1	0	0	0	0	0	1	2	10	1
San Francisco	0	0	0	0	0	0	1	2	X	3	4	1
WP: Rick Reuschel (1–1) LP: Mike Bielecki (0–1) Sv: Steve Bedrosian (3)

Before the game, the Tower of Power horn section played the National Anthem.

The Giants made it to their first World Series since 1962 with a 3–2 win over the Cubs to win the 1989 National League pennant, four games to one. The final game pitted Mike Bielecki against a well-rested (due to his quick exit from Game 2) Rick Reuschel. Reuschel made amends for his poor start in Game 2 by giving up only one run over eight innings. The one run Reuschel gave up was an unearned run the Cubs scored when Walton reached on an error by Mitchell and then scored on Ryne Sandberg's double. The Cubs held the 1–0 lead until the seventh inning when Will Clark tripled and scored on Mitchell's sacrifice fly.

With two outs in the eighth, the Cubs appeared ready to perhaps send the series back to Chicago, but Candy Maldonado pinch-hit for Reuschel and walked. Bielecki then proceeded to load the bases by walking both Butler and Thompson. Don Zimmer sent for Mitch Williams to end the jam, but Clark drove home the pennant-winning runs with a single to center that gave the Giants a 3–1 lead. Les Lancaster got Matt Williams out to end the inning but the Cubs were finished.

They did rally, however, in the ninth with three straight singles that made it 3–2. But the rally would be for naught, as Steve Bedrosian ultimately notched his third consecutive save by inducing a ground ball from Sandberg to end the game and series, and send the Giants to their first World Series since 1962.

Clark's stellar performance earned him Most Valuable Player honors for the Giants. Clark hit .650 with eight RBIs.

== Composite box ==
1989 NLCS (4–1): San Francisco Giants over Chicago Cubs

Team	1	2	3	4	5	6	7	8	9	R	H	E
San Francisco Giants	7	0	3	7	2	0	3	7	1	30	44	5
Chicago Cubs	11	1	2	1	2	3	1	0	1	22	53	3
Total attendance: 264,617 Average attendance: 52,923

== Television coverage ==
NBC play-by-play man Vin Scully was unable to call Game 2 because he had come down with laryngitis. Thus, number two play-by-play man, Bob Costas filled-in for him. Around the same time, Costas was assigned to call the American League Championship Series between Oakland and Toronto. Game 2 of the NLCS occurred on Thursday, October 5, which was an off day for the ALCS. NBC then decided to fly Costas from Toronto to Chicago to substitute for Scully on Thursday night. Afterwards, Costas flew back to Toronto, where he resumed work on the ALCS the next night.

Game 5 of the 1989 NLCS (October 9, 1989) was the last Major League Baseball game that NBC, which had broadcast MLB in some shape or form since 1947, would televise for five years (CBS would become the exclusive broadcast television network home for Major League Baseball in the meantime); the ensuing World Series was broadcast on ABC, with those four games being that network's last in the same timeframe. NBC would next televise a Major League Baseball game on July 12, 1994 (the All-Star Game from Pittsburgh); that same year, ABC began to broadcast Saturday night games via The Baseball Network. During the 1995 season, NBC began broadcasting Friday night games, with ABC still continuing Saturday night games, and the two networks would rotate postseason series, as well as games in the World Series, in which the Atlanta Braves defeated the Cleveland Indians, 4 games to 2.

Game 5 also turned out to be Vin Scully's last televised postseason appearance for a network. He would return to CBS from 1990 to 1997 to become the lead announcer for CBS Radio Sports' World Series coverage. Between television and radio, he has called all or part of 28 World Series — more than any other announcer. He retired in 2016.

After The Baseball Network was dissolved, Fox took over the exclusive broadcast rights for MLB regular season games, although NBC would still broadcast select postseason games and alternate with Fox for World Series coverage. By 2001, Fox became the exclusive broadcast home for the MLB postseason as well, a position it held through 2006. Beginning in 2007, TBS and Fox would alternate televising the LCS, with Fox taking the ALCS in odd years, and the NLCS in even years. TBS would do the reverse, televising the NLCS in odd years and the ALCS in even years.

== Aftermath ==
Giants pitcher Dave Dravecky, who would ultimately have his pitching arm amputated due to cancer, broke his arm during the Giants' on-field celebration following Game 5.

The Giants were swept by the Athletics in the 1989 World Series. The 1989 World Series was most known for the Loma Prieta earthquake, which hit minutes before Game 3 causing significant damage to both Oakland and San Francisco. The game was postponed out of concerns for the safety of everyone in the ballpark as well as the loss of power, with commissioner Fay Vincent later saying that he did not know when play would resume. The series resumed ten days later on October 27 and finished the next day. Until that point, it was the latest a World Series had ever been played.

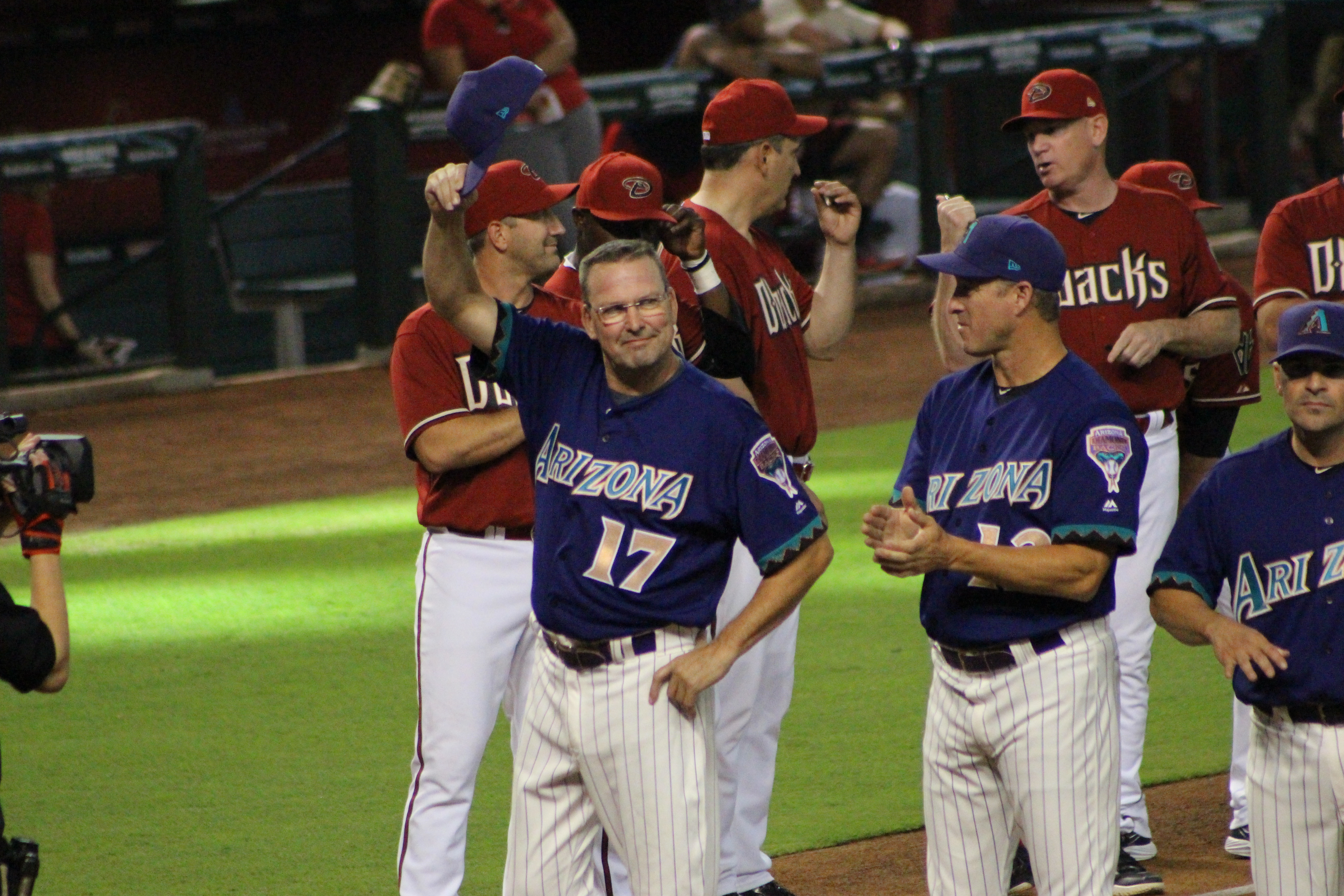
Mark Grace (waving cap) and Matt Williams (farthest right in the red jersey), among others, during the Diamondbacks alumni game in 2018.

Longtime Giants catcher Bob Brenly would later serve as a color analyst for televised Chicago Cubs games from 2005–2012. In between the end of his playing career and his announcing career, Brenly won a World Series managing the 2001 Arizona Diamondbacks. On that 2001 Diamondbacks team were a 35-year old Matt Williams and a 37-year old Mark Grace, who both played in the 1989 NLCS for Giants and Cubs, respectively. Williams and Grace would also serve as coaches for the Diamondbacks under manager Chip Hale from 2014 to 2015.

Known for their title droughts—the Giants had never won a World Series in San Francisco, while the Cubs had not won in 81 years at the time of this series in 1989—both teams would have to wait until the 2010s to win a World Series. In 2010, the Giants defeated the Texas Rangers in five games to win the World Series for the first time since moving to San Francisco in 1958, thus ending the 52-year "Curse of Coogan's Bluff". The Cubs beat the Cleveland Indians in the 2016 World Series in seven games after trailing in the series 3 games to 1. They won Game 7 by a score of 8–7 in 10 innings at Cleveland's Progressive Field, ending their 108-year drought and the Curse of the Billy Goat.

The Cubs and Giants met in a Wild Card tiebreaker in 1998 where the Cubs advanced, beating the Giants 5–3. On their way to the 2016 World Series, the Cubs also beat the Giants in the 2016 NLDS, 3 games to 1. The Cubs series clinching win in Game 4 was their first postseason win in a game played on the West coast. They had previously lost their first 10 games as the visiting team on the West Coast in the postseason, which included three losses in San Francisco in the 1989 NLCS.
