= Steve Wilson (baseball) =

Canadian baseball player (born 1964)

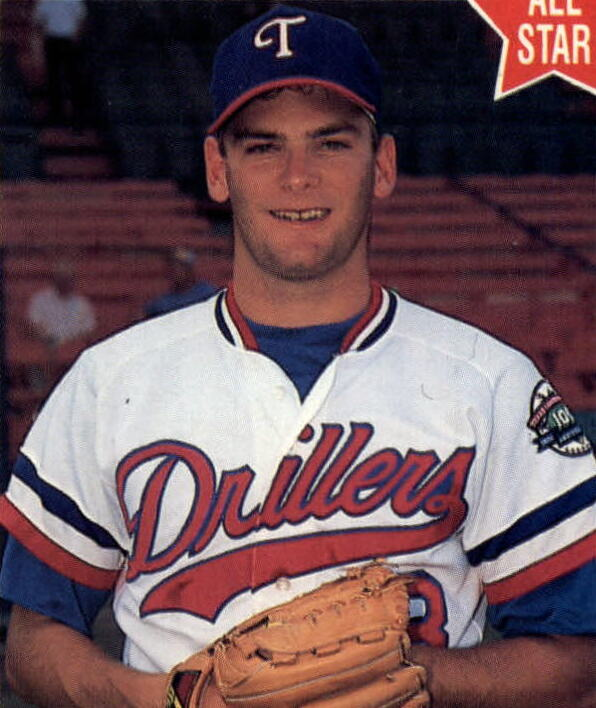
- Wilson with the Tulsa Drillers c. 1988
- Pitcher
- Born: December 13, 1964 (age 61); Victoria, British Columbia, Canada
- Batted: Left Threw: Left

MLB debut
- September 16, 1988, for the Texas Rangers

Last MLB appearance
- October 2, 1993, for the Los Angeles Dodgers

MLB statistics
- Win–loss record: 13–18
- Earned run average: 4.40
- Strikeouts: 252
- Stats at Baseball Reference

Teams
- Texas Rangers (1988); Chicago Cubs (1989–1991); Los Angeles Dodgers (1991–1993)

Stephen Douglas Wilson (born December 13, 1964) is a Canadian former professional baseball player. A left-handed pitcher, he played all or part of six seasons in Major League Baseball. He is an alumnus of the University of Portland and participated in the 1983 Pan American Games and the 1984 Summer Olympics for Canada.

In 1984, Steve pitched for the Alaska Goldpanners of Fairbanks summer amateur baseball club, where he was among 12 other players to eventually reach the major leagues.

Wilson was drafted by the Texas Rangers in 1985 in the 4th round, 83rd overall, and went on to make his Major League Baseball debut with the Texas Rangers on September 16, 1988. On December 5, 1988, Wilson was traded from the Rangers to the Chicago Cubs with Paul Kilgus, Curtis Wilkerson, and Mitch Williams for Rafael Palmeiro, Jamie Moyer, and Drew Hall. After two and a half seasons in Chicago, he was then traded to the Los Angeles Dodgers for Jeff Hartsock. Wilson appeared in his final major league game on October 2, 1993.

Wilson pitched in the Milwaukee Brewers organization in 1994, and in the Chicago White Sox system in 1996. In 1997 and 1998 Wilson played for the Taiwan Major League (TML)'s Kaohsiung-Pingtung Fala.
