= Curtis Wilkerson =

American baseball player (born 1961)

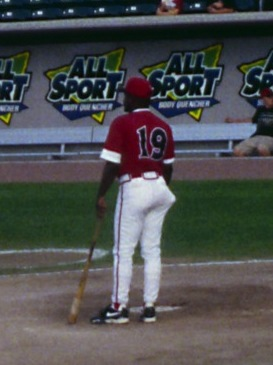
- Wilkerson with the Lansing Lugnuts in 2006
- Infielder
- Born: April 26, 1961 (age 64); Petersburg, Virginia, U.S.
- Batted: Switch Threw: Right

MLB debut
- September 10, 1983, for the Texas Rangers

Last MLB appearance
- May 16, 1993, for the Kansas City Royals

MLB statistics
- Batting average: .245
- Home runs: 8
- Runs batted in: 179
- Stats at Baseball Reference

Teams
- Texas Rangers (1983–1988); Chicago Cubs (1989–1990); Pittsburgh Pirates (1991); Kansas City Royals (1992–1993)

Curtis Vernon Wilkerson (born April 26, 1961) is an American former professional baseball player. He played in Major League Baseball as a utility player for the Texas Rangers, Chicago Cubs, Pittsburgh Pirates, and Kansas City Royals from 1983 to 1993.

He was drafted in the fourth round of the 1980 Major League Baseball draft by the Texas Rangers. Although he made his Major League debut as a late-season call-up in 1983, 1984 was his official rookie season; he was named the Rangers' Rookie of the Year that season.

On December 5, 1988, he was traded by the Texas Rangers with Paul Kilgus, Mitch Williams, Steve Wilson, and minor leaguers Luis Benitez and Pablo Delgado to the Chicago Cubs for Rafael Palmeiro, Jamie Moyer, and Drew Hall. After two seasons with the Cubs, Wilkerson played with the Pittsburgh Pirates and the Kansas City Royals.

After ending his playing career, Wilkerson coached in the Royals and Pirates organizations. He was the manager of the Tarrant County Blue Thunder of the independent Continental Baseball League before the team folded after the 2008 season.
