= Marvell Wynne (baseball) =

American baseball player (born 1959)

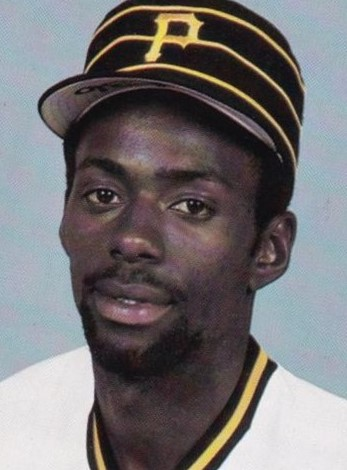
- Outfielder
- Born: December 17, 1959 (age 65); Chicago, Illinois, U.S.
- Batted: Left Threw: Left

Professional debut
- MLB: June 15, 1983, for the Pittsburgh Pirates
- NPB: April 6, 1991, for the Hanshin Tigers

Last appearance
- MLB: October 3, 1990, for the Chicago Cubs
- NPB: October 12, 1991, for the Hanshin Tigers

MLB statistics
- Batting average: .247
- Home runs: 40
- Runs batted in: 244

NPB statistics
- Batting average: .230
- Home runs: 13
- Runs batted in: 44
- Stats at Baseball Reference

Teams
- Pittsburgh Pirates (1983–1985); San Diego Padres (1986–1989); Chicago Cubs (1989–1990); Hanshin Tigers (1991)

Marvell Wynne (born December 17, 1959) is an American former professional baseball player. He played eight seasons in Major League Baseball for the Pittsburgh Pirates (1983–85), San Diego Padres (1986–89), and Chicago Cubs (1989–90), primarily as a center fielder. He also played one season in Japan, in 1991. Wynne batted and threw left-handed. He is the father of professional soccer player Marvell Wynne.

== Career ==
In an eight-season career, Wynne, a graduate of Chicago's Hirsch High School, posted a .247 batting average with 40 home runs and 244 RBI in 940 games played. In 1984, Wynne hit .266 BA with 77 runs, 174 hits, 24 doubles, 11 triples, 24 stolen bases in 154 games – all career-highs. On April 13, 1987, Wynne, Tony Gwynn, and John Kruk became the first players in major league history to open a game with three consecutive solo home runs in a 13–6 San Diego Padres win over the San Francisco Giants. All three players were left-handed.

Wynne was a member of the 1989 Cubs team that won the National League East Division title. The team lost to the San Francisco Giants in the NLCS. Wynne played in Japan for the Hanshin Tigers of the Central League in 1991.

== Personal life ==
Wynne's son Marvell Wynne II was a defender for the San Jose Earthquakes of Major League Soccer.
