= Joe Kraemer =

American baseball player (born 1964)

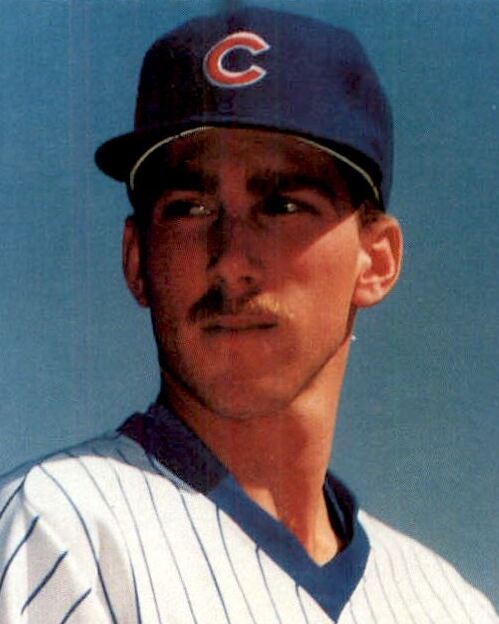
- Kraemer c. 1987
- Pitcher
- Born: September 10, 1964 (age 61); Olympia, Washington, U.S.
- Batted: Left Threw: Left

MLB debut
- August 22, 1989, for the Chicago Cubs

Last MLB appearance
- June 25, 1990, for the Chicago Cubs

MLB statistics
- Win–loss record: 0–1
- Earned run average: 6.91
- Strikeouts: 21
- Stats at Baseball Reference

Teams
- Chicago Cubs (1989–1990)

Joseph Wayne Kraemer (born September 10, 1964) is an American former professional baseball pitcher. He played professionally from 1985 to 1994 and in Major League Baseball (MLB) in 1989 and 1990.

== Early life ==
He attended both Portland State University and Lower Columbia College.

== Professional career ==
Kraemer was drafted three times. First, by the New York Mets in the second round of the 1983 Major League Baseball draft. He did not sign. He was then drafted by the Seattle Mariners in the sixth round of the 1984 Major League Baseball draft. Again, he did not sign. The third and final time he was drafted was in 1985 Major League Baseball draft, by the Chicago Cubs in the 16th round of the amateur entry draft.

=== Chicago Cubs ===
He began his professional career in 1985 with the Wytheville Cubs. In 22 games, he went 4–2 with a 3.35 ERA and 52 strikeouts in 45 2/3 innings of work. His control was suspect, as he walked 36 batters, or about seven per nine innings.

In 1986 with the Peoria Chiefs, he was perhaps the team's best relief pitcher. He made 45 relief appearances, posting a 6–3 record with a 1.09 ERA, 14 saves and 78 strikeouts in 66 1/3 innings of work. He also showed improved control, as he walked only 19 batters, or about three per nine innings. His 1.09 ERA and 14 saves led the team.

1987 wasn't nearly as good a season for Kraemer. He appeared in 41 games for the Winston-Salem Spirits, going 3–2 with a 2.73 ERA, 13 saves and 43 strikeouts in 52 2/3 innings of work. He also appeared in five games with the Iowa Cubs, posting a 1–0 record with two strikeouts and a 27.00 ERA in 2 2/3 innings of work. Overall that season, he went 4–2 with a 3.90 ERA and 45 strikeouts in 55 1/3 innings of work. His walk total again increased to a total of 46 overall.

In 1988, Kraemer started more than a few games in a season for the first time in his career. Pitching for the Pittsfield Cubs, Kraemer made 15 starts, going 5–5 with a 2.75 ERA and 47 strikeouts in 95 innings of work. He then pitched for the Iowa Cubs again, being used almost entirely as a reliever (he made only one start). In 20 games with them, he went 3–3 with a 4.50 ERA and 26 strikeouts in 26 innings of work. In total, Kraemer went 8–8 with a 3.12 ERA in 1988. He made 35 appearances, 16 of which were starts. In 121 innings, he struck out 73 batters and walked 60.

Save for one game with the big league club in 1989, Kraemer's entire season was spent with the Iowa Cubs. He started 27 games, going 8–10 with a 3.47 ERA in 181 2/3 innings with them. He walked 50 batters and struck out 113. He completed seven games as well.

Kraemer made his big league debut on August 22, 1989 at the age of 24 versus the Cincinnati Reds. The first batter he faced was Dave Collins, who lined out. The rest of the game didn't go so smoothly for him - in fact, he gave up six runs in just 3 2/3 innings of work. Because of shaky defense behind him however, only two of those runs were earned. Nevertheless, he got the loss and posted a 4.91 ERA in his rookie season.

The following year, Kraemer spent time in the majors and minors again. He started out with the big league club, but by June 26 he was in the minors again. While in the majors in 1990, Kraemer went 0–0 with a 7.20 ERA in 18 relief appearances. After being sent down to the Iowa Cubs, he was used entirely as a starter, making 20 appearances and going 7–6 with a 3.76 ERA. He played his final big league game on June 25, 1990.

He spent all of 1991 with the Iowa Cubs. He went 8–7 with a 4.60 ERA in 20 appearances, 19 of which were starts.

Overall, Kraemer went 0–1 with a 6.91 ERA in 28 2/3 big league innings. In 19 games, he walked 16 batters, struck out 21 and threw two wild pitches.

=== California Angels ===
After the 1991 season, he became a minor league free agent. He wound up in the California Angels organization for the 1992 season. He pitched for both the Midland Angels and Edmonton Trappers, going a combined 3–3 with a 4.61 ERA in 46 appearances, seven of which were starts. In 80 innings, he struck out 60 batters and walked 38.

As an affiliated minor leaguer, he went 48–41 with a 3.57 ERA. In 791 1/3 innings, he walked 337 batters and struck out 582.

=== Independent leagues ===
Following his career as an affiliated baseball player, he played with the Sioux City Explorers of the Northern League in 1993-94.
