= Dean Wilkins (baseball) =

American baseball player (born 1966)

- Pitcher
- Born: August 24, 1966 (age 58); Blue Island, Illinois, U.S.
- Batted: Right Threw: Right

MLB debut
- August 21, 1989, for the Chicago Cubs

Last MLB appearance
- August 9, 1991, for the Houston Astros

MLB statistics
- Win–loss record: 3–1
- Earned run average: 7.55
- Strikeouts: 21
- Stats at Baseball Reference

Teams
- Chicago Cubs (1989–1990); Houston Astros (1991)

Dean Allan Wilkins (born August 24, 1966), is a professional baseball player who played pitcher in the Major Leagues from 1989 to 1991. He played for the Chicago Cubs and Houston Astros.
