= Les Lancaster =

American baseball player (born 1962)

Idaho Falls Chukars
- Pitcher
- Born: April 21, 1962 (age 63); Dallas, Texas, U.S.
- Batted: Right Threw: Right

MLB debut
- April 7, 1987, for the Chicago Cubs

Last MLB appearance
- October 3, 1993, for the St. Louis Cardinals

MLB statistics
- Win–loss record: 41–28
- Earned run average: 4.05
- Strikeouts: 408
- Stats at Baseball Reference

Teams
- Chicago Cubs (1987–1991); Detroit Tigers (1992); St. Louis Cardinals (1993)

Lester Wayne Lancaster (born April 21, 1962) is an American former professional baseball pitcher. He played in Major League Baseball for the Chicago Cubs, Detroit Tigers, and St. Louis Cardinals from 1987 to 1993 and later managed in the minor leagues.

Along with fellow reliever Mitch Williams, Lancaster helped lead the Chicago Cubs to a 1989 National League East division title.

Lancaster played college baseball for the Arkansas Razorbacks and Dallas Baptist University.

In 703.2 innings of work, Lancaster was 41–28, a winning percentage of .594 with an earned run average of 4.05. He was a good fielding pitcher, committing only one error in 139 total chances for a .993 fielding percentage.

In November 2025, Lancaster was announced as the new manager of the Idaho Falls Chukars.
