= Mitch Williams =

American baseball player and analyst (born 1964)

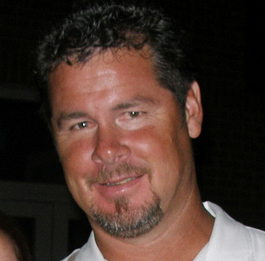
- Pitcher
- Born: November 17, 1964 (age 62); Santa Ana, California, U.S.
- Batted: Left Threw: Left

MLB debut
- April 9, 1986, for the Texas Rangers

Last MLB appearance
- May 10, 1997, for the Kansas City Royals

MLB statistics
- Win–loss record: 45–58
- Earned run average: 3.65
- Strikeouts: 660
- Saves: 192
- Stats at Baseball Reference

Teams
- Texas Rangers (1986–1988); Chicago Cubs (1989–1990); Philadelphia Phillies (1991–1993); Houston Astros (1994); California Angels (1995); Kansas City Royals (1997)

Career highlights and awards
- All-Star (1989)

Mitchell Steven Williams (born November 17, 1964), nicknamed "Wild Thing", is an American former relief pitcher in Major League Baseball (MLB) who played for six teams from 1986 to 1997. He was also a studio analyst for the MLB Network from 2009 to 2014.

Williams, a left-hander with a high-90s fastball and major control issues, was largely effective, especially in the early part of his career earning 192 saves in his 11 seasons including a career high of 43 in 1993. He gave up a walk-off home run to Joe Carter of the Toronto Blue Jays in the sixth game of the 1993 World Series, which gave Toronto a World Series championship win over the Phillies. Williams' career went into decline afterward, although he played in parts of three more major league seasons.

== Early playing career ==
Williams was drafted out of high school in West Linn, Oregon, in 1982, by the San Diego Padres. The Texas Rangers acquired him in 1985, and he made his major league debut for the Rangers in 1986. It was with the Rangers that Williams earned the nickname "Wild Thing" due in large part to his awkward delivery to the plate in which he would fall to the third base side of the mound during his follow through, and also because of issues he had with control. The Rangers traded him to the Chicago Cubs after the 1988 season.

== Chicago Cubs ==
Williams' extravagant wind-up and release, as well as his frequent wild pitches, drew comparisons to film character Rick "Wild Thing" Vaughn (played by Charlie Sheen) in the 1989 David S. Ward film Major League. When he joined the Cubs, Wrigley Field organist Gary Pressy began playing The Troggs' "Wild Thing" as he came out of the bullpen, mimicking the scenes in the film.

A power reliever, he put his full weight behind every pitch, so that he dropped hard to the right, sometimes falling off the mound. In 1993, Williams started wearing the number 99 (he originally wore the number 28) on his jersey, the same number that Vaughn wore in the film. According to an interview on The Dan Patrick Show on October 22, 2008, the number change had nothing to do with the Major League film. Williams said he had wanted the number 99 for years and years because of an admiration for the football player Mark Gastineau, who also wore number 99. Williams said that he did not change his number until 1993 because that was his first chance to do it.

Cubs manager Don Zimmer said Williams "did everything 99 miles an hour", and teammate and close friend Mark Grace said "Mitch pitches like his hair's on fire." A Sports Illustrated article stated that "He has two pitches--fastball #1 and fastball #2." The New Yorker baseball writer Roger Angell chortled over his "scary, hilarious antics", saying "he flung the ball and then... flung himself after it, winding up with his back to home plate... peering over his left shoulder in case anyone accidentally made contact."

=== 1989 ===
One of Williams's best seasons came in 1989 as a member of the Chicago Cubs. Williams had a win–loss record of 4–4 with a 2.76 ERA, 67 strikeouts (in 76 appearances during the regular season) and 36 saves. That year, Williams made the All-Star team for the only time in his career. He also hit the only home run of his career that season. He was a key figure in the Cubs winning the National League East title in 1989.

Williams became the first player in MLB history to record a save without throwing a pitch. On April 28, 1989, he entered the game against the San Diego Padres with a 3–1 lead and two outs in the ninth inning. Williams picked off the Padres' Carmelo Martínez at second base to end the game.

==== National League Championship Series ====
In the League Championship Series against the San Francisco Giants, Williams made two appearances, in Games 2 and 5. He did not give up any earned runs and recorded two strikeouts.

However, in Game 5, with the score tied at 1–1 in the bottom of the eighth inning, Williams gave up a two-run RBI single to Will Clark. Williams was removed, and NBC's cameras caught him in the dugout with a towel over his head. Moments later, the Giants finished the Cubs off to win their first National League pennant in 27 years.

== Philadelphia Phillies ==
The Cubs dealt Williams to the Philadelphia Phillies at the start of the 1991 campaign. That year, he won 12 games, including eight in August, and saved 30 for the Phillies. However, he suffered eight losses in 1992 and seven more in 1993. Still, manager Jim Fregosi chose Williams as the team's closer entering the World Series against the defending champion Toronto Blue Jays.

On July 2, 1993, in the second game of a 12-hour double-header delayed repeatedly by rain, Williams came up to bat in the tenth inning and ended the game at 4:40 am with an RBI single, the only walk-off hit of his career and one of only three hits overall. Williams recorded it off Trevor Hoffman, one of the only two closers to have 600 or more saves. It was also his only plate appearance of the season and the final one of his career.

During Williams' time in Philadelphia, his walkout theme changed artists; instead of the original version by The Troggs, American punk-rock band X’s cover (the same one used in the Major League films) was played when he made his entrance from the bullpen.

=== 1993 World Series ===
During that World Series, whenever Williams was on the mound, his nervous teammate Curt Schilling was caught by CBS television cameras with a towel over his head. Schilling's behavior not only irked Williams (who to this day harbors bitter feelings towards Schilling), but also fellow Phillies teammates like Larry Andersen and Danny Jackson, who accused Schilling of purposely trying to get more camera time. On subsequent nights, several other Phillies were seen wearing towels—possibly to keep Schilling from looking unique. The gesture was taken up almost as a good-luck charm by fans in the seats.

Williams earned a save in Game 2 of the series, relieving Terry Mulholland as the Phillies tied the series at a game each. However, relieving Larry Andersen in the eighth inning of Game 4 with a 14–10 lead with one out and two on, Williams allowed a walk and three hits and was charged with three of the six Blue Jays eighth-inning runs. Devon White's two-out two-run double off Williams gave the Blue Jays a 15–14 lead that would be the eventual final score, securing the Blue Jays a 3–1 series lead, while Williams picked up a blown save and the loss. Afterwards, Williams received death threats from angry Phillies fans for blowing the game.

After the Phillies won Game 5 in a complete-game shutout by Curt Schilling, the series returned to Toronto for Game 6. The Phillies scored five runs in the seventh inning to take a 6–5 lead, and it was up to Williams to preserve the victory and force a Game 7. Rickey Henderson led off the inning for the Jays and promptly walked on four pitches. After getting a flyout, Paul Molitor singled to center field to get Joe Carter (who Williams described as a "down-and-in hitter") to the plate with one out and two runners on base in the bottom of the ninth inning, Joe Carter hit a 2–2 pitch over the left-field wall for a walk-off home run, giving the Blue Jays an 8–6 victory and a World Series championship.

Williams later placed the blame on himself for what happened in the 1993 World Series, adding that he had put the ordeal behind him:

There are people who work a hell of a lot harder than I do in this world. I’m not going to sit and whine and complain over the fact that I was in the World Series and I lost.

—Mitch Williams on his feelings about surrendering the home run to Joe Carter

In 2011, 17 years after giving up the World Series home run, Williams said he regretted using the slide step when pitching to Carter. In a joint interview with Carter for the MLB Network's 20 Greatest Games series, Williams said he hadn't used the slide step before but was talked into doing so by pitching coach Johnny Podres after allowing a walk to base-stealing legend Rickey Henderson.

Despite having the highest number of lefty saves in his career with the Phillies (102), the Carter blast was the end of the line for Williams in Philadelphia. The Phillies traded him to the Houston Astros prior to the start of the 1994 season.

== Post-Phillies career ==
Williams' post-Phillies career was a comedown from his previous heights. He would register only two wins and six saves in his final three major league seasons, with an ERA of 6.75 or above in all three campaigns. After two months with Houston in 1994, Williams closed out his major league career with equally short stints with the California Angels in 1995 and the Kansas City Royals in 1997.

== Retirement ==
After retiring from baseball, Williams began to operate a bowling establishment outside Philadelphia. Although Phillies fans continued to blame Williams for the 1993 World Series loss for several years afterward, the fact that he did not make excuses for the blown save, shift the blame to others, or hide from the media or the city of Philadelphia caused many fans to ultimately forgive him and embrace him once again as a local figure. He is featured on many murals and city art around the Philadelphia area.

The Atlantic City Surf of the independent Atlantic League lured Williams back into uniform to pitch in 2001. He went 4–3 for the Surf that season and then became the club's pitching coach for 2002 and 2003. He was not retained as coach after a year and a half. Williams has been out of professional baseball since then.

In July 2011, Williams participated in a House Crashers episode from the DIY Network, in which a local Phillies fan won a makeover of his home's sports den.

Williams sued Deadspin and MLB Network, claiming defamation and breach of contract in 2014 for a report on him regarding his actions during a youth baseball tournament, including his alleged cursing of an umpire and calling children on other teams derogatory names. The lawsuit against MLB claimed all accusations were fabricated. Williams apologized for his behavior at the tournament at the request of his employers. BBC In June 2016, Williams's suit against Deadspin was dismissed by summary judgment. This was because Deadspin went bankrupt after Hulk Hogan’s victory against them in court. In June 2017, Williams prevailed in his lawsuit against MLB Network and was awarded $1.5 million by a jury.

He and former teammate Lenny Dykstra were involved in a profane exchange, captured on camera, during a May 2015 sports roast in Philadelphia.

=== Broadcasting ===
In March 2007, Williams joined Philadelphia radio station 610 WIP AM as a part-time cohost of the Angelo Cataldi and the Morning Team show heard from 5:30 to 10:00 am on weekdays. Williams generally appeared one day per week. In April 2007, Williams joined Comcast SportsNet Philadelphia as a post-game analyst for broadcasts of Philadelphia Phillies games. On January 3, 2009, Williams joined MLB Network as a studio analyst where he was a regular on the network's MLB Tonight program until 2014.

Williams served as a color commentator for Fox Sports occasionally commentating national games. Williams came under some criticism for stating that the correct way to catch a fly ball was with one hand rather than two, after Cincinnati Reds outfielder Fred Lewis made an error in a game vs. the Atlanta Braves on July 23, 2011.
