= Gary Pressy =

American organist

Gary Pressy is an American organist. He played organ for the Chicago Cubs at Wrigley Field in Chicago, Illinois. On Saturday, May 25, 2019, Pressy reached his 2,633-consecutive played game; never having missed a day in 33 years. He retired at the end of the 2019 season.

== Early life ==
Pressy knew he wanted to play organ for a sports team, especially a major league team, since he was 5-years old. He began playing the organ as a young boy in the Ashburn area of Chicago, near St. Thomas More Church. Pressy would often imitate the organists he would hear on the radio during broadcast games. Watching the World Series on television, he thought to himself: “Boy, I’d like to do that! ”

Pressy played the organ throughout his school days at St. Laurence High School in Chicago, graduating in 1975. He continued private organ studies with Russ Caifano while in college and began sending out resumes to area teams who may have been in need of an organist.

John McDonough hired him to play for the Chicago Sting soccer club. When McDonough transferred to the Chicago Cubs organization in 1987, Pressy went with him. Of Pressy, McDonough says: “The one thing that struck me with Gary was he was so reliable. Those jobs are important. It’s hard to have a backup for the organist. He gets along with everybody. He’s a craftsman.”

== Career ==
Wrigley Field was the first Major League ballpark to have organ music on April 26, 1941. Pressy was hired in 1987. He marks the 2016 Chicago Cubs World Series as one of his most cherished highlights of his career.

On August 28, 2017, Pressy tweeted: Big homestand starts tonight, but special night as it's my 2500th consecutive game as organist at WF. Thank you fans! - GP.

On Saturday, May 25, 2019, Pressy reached his 2,633-consecutive game milestone, never having missed a day in 33 years. The streak would surpass Baltimore Orioles’ Cal Ripken Jr.'s Hall of Fame consecutive games-played on the field (2,632). Pressy spoke of the achievement and comparison in an April 2019 interview stating: “That’s a whole different ballgame, pardon the pun … but it is flattering that they even mention that.”

== Ballgame music ==
Regarding the famous “7th inning stretch”, for years sportscaster Harry Caray would sing "Take Me Out to the Ballgame". After Caray died in February 1998, various singers and celebrities would guest appear to lead the crowd in singing the song. Pressy cites Mike Ditka’s performance on July 4, 1998 as his most memorable accompaniment. Others include Ozzy Osbourne, who Pressy still says to this day he [Ozzy] “sang it backwards … but he did sing at the end: "let’s get some runs!”, and Vin Scully: “He nailed it.”

Pressy, a self-professed avid baseball fan, told a reporter in 2019 that his deep knowledge of the game influences how he does his job: “I’ll know when a batter has three balls on him and the next pitch could be a walk, so you are going to need to play a walking song. And you have to just know things like how you don’t play when the pitcher is about to throw the ball. There are a lot of rules that you have to follow.”

For 26 years, Pressy would play specifically assigned “walk-up” music for each player, saying: “it was fun to choose songs based on a player's number, their names or their hometowns.” When the Cubs retired catcher Buster Posey, Pressy played the theme to Ghostbusters. For Cubs pitcher Kerry Wood's last game on May 18, 2012, Pressy played My Way as Wood left the mound. For pitcher Tom Gorzelanny, Pressy performed the Marist High School’s fight song whenever he entered the game.

In 2016, a big screen was introduced along with a DJ. Pressy adapted to the new format by updating his repertoire to include such artists as Lady Gaga, Bruno Mars, Katy Perry, etc. “You try to do different types of styles …”, Pressy says, “The one thing about the fans, there’s all different types of people who come to the ballpark. You have 80-year-olds and 10-year-olds.” He even plays holiday classics; but refuses to play There's No Place Like Home for the Holidays, because “we don’t want him touching home plate”.

The Cubs created a special bobblehead of Pressy seated at the Wrigley organ to commemorate 30 years with the organization. Pressy awards fans with the one-of-a-kind prize who answer trivia questions correctly on his Twitter account during games.

Today, organs at baseball stadiums have been made redundant in exchange for canned music. Pressy says: "I don't think it's a dying art, especially at Wrigley Field,” The team, he says, respects tradition. Pressy played on a Lowrey organ.
