= Marvell Wynne (soccer) =

American soccer player (born 1986)

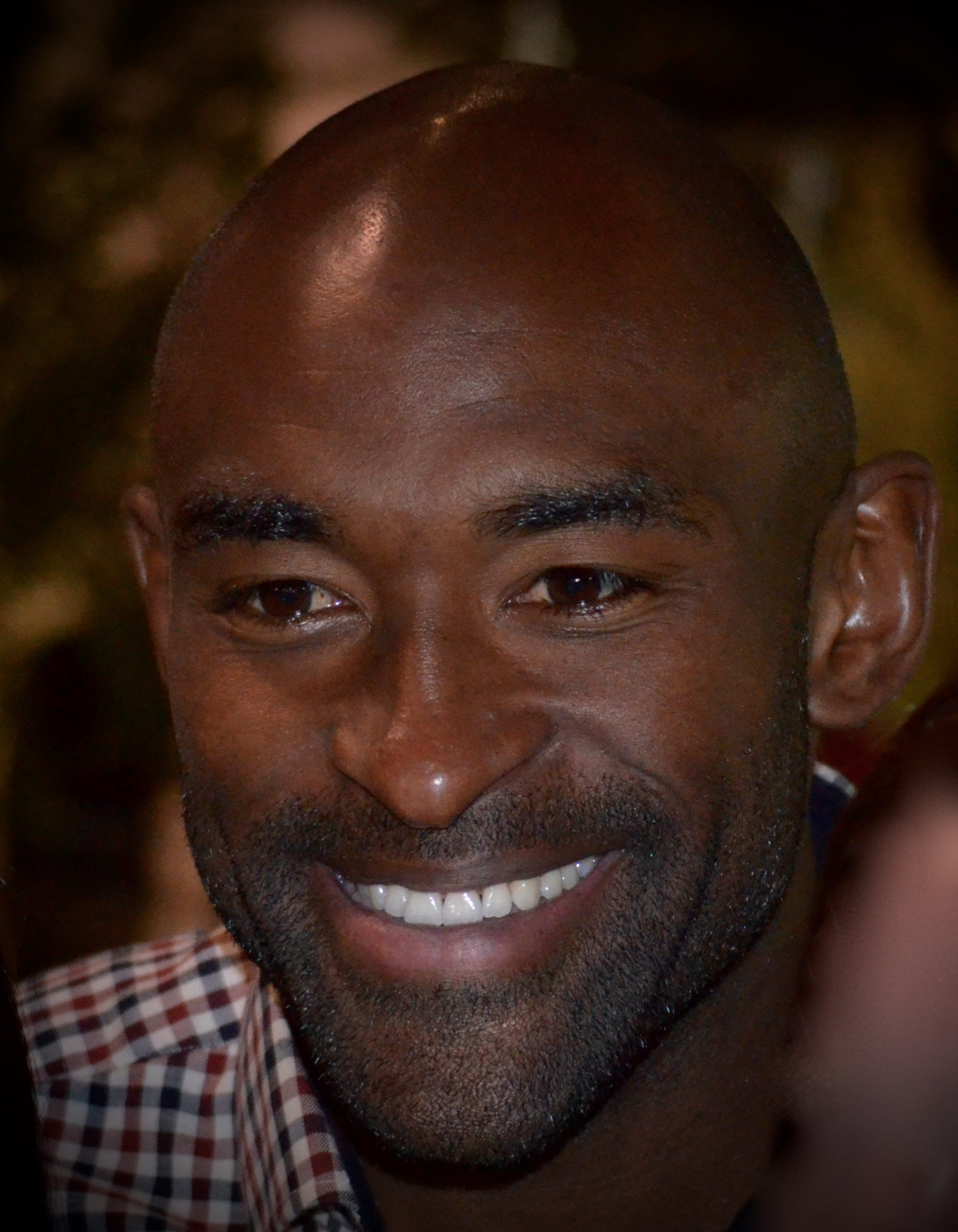
- Wynne in 2015

Personal information
- Full name: Marvell Wynne II
- Date of birth: May 8, 1986 (age 40)
- Place of birth: Pittsburgh, Pennsylvania, U.S.
- Height: 5 ft 9 in (1.75 m)
- Positions: Right-back; centre-back

College career
Years	Team	Apps	(Gls)
2004–2005	UCLA Bruins		

Senior career*
Years	Team	Apps	(Gls)
2006–2007	New York Red Bulls	29	(0)
2007–2009	Toronto FC	67	(2)
2010–2014	Colorado Rapids	140	(0)
2015–2017	San Jose Earthquakes	65	(0)
Total		301	(2)

International career
2004–2006	United States U20		
2007–2008	United States U23	3	(0)
2007–2011	United States	5	(0)
Medal record
Representing United States
Men's soccer
FIFA Confederations Cup
Runner-up	2009 South Africa
- * Club domestic league appearances and goals

Marvell Wynne II (born May 8, 1986) is an American former soccer player. He was a starting defender on the Colorado Rapids' 2010 MLS Cup Championship team and the 2008 United States Olympic soccer team, and made several appearances for the U.S. men's national team.

== Personal ==
Born in Pittsburgh, Pennsylvania, Wynne is the son of former Major League Baseball player Marvell Wynne.

== Career ==
=== High school and college ===
Wynne decided to pursue an athletic career of his own as early as the age of six, choosing soccer over his father's sport, baseball. He attended Poway High School in Poway, California and was a letterman in soccer and track. Wynne in his senior year of high school ran the 100 meters dash in 11.05 seconds. Wynne played two years of college soccer at UCLA, where he was named first team All-American in 2005.

=== Professional ===
==== New York Red Bulls ====
Wynne was the first pick at the 2006 MLS SuperDraft, with the MetroStars (later renamed as New York Red Bulls) trading up to make the selection. He subsequently signed a Generation adidas contract with the league.

Known for his speed — he is considered one of the fastest players in the league — Wynne was initially considered too unpolished to play in the 3-5-2 system favored by then-coach Mo Johnston, but as Bruce Arena succeeded to the coaching position, Wynne began starting regularly in the first team's back line.

==== Toronto FC ====
Wynne was traded to Toronto FC in April 2007 in exchange for a partial allocation and a 2nd round pick in the 2008 MLS SuperDraft. In Toronto, Wynne he continued to impress, becoming a firm favorite amongst the fans. He scored his first career MLS goal in a game against Houston Dynamo on September 27, 2008.

==== Colorado Rapids ====
On March 25, 2010, Wynne was traded to Colorado Rapids in exchange for Nick LaBrocca and a 3rd round pick in the 2011 MLS SuperDraft. After a successful season with Colorado in which he converted from right back to center back, the team won MLS Cup 2010 – a game which took place at BMO Field in Toronto, Wynne's former home.

==== San Jose Earthquakes ====
Following the 2014 season, his fifth campaign in Colorado, the Rapids declined Wynne's 2015 contract option. In December 2014 he entered the 2014 MLS Re-Entry Draft and was selected in stage two by San Jose Earthquakes. Wynne was sidelined indefinitely from the 2017 season after the discovery of a heart abnormality during preseason. He underwent surgery for an enlarged aortic root, but was unable to secure medical clearance to return to the game, and officially announced his retirement as an active player on April 20, 2018.

=== International ===
Wynne has played for various youth United States national teams, and was part of the Under-20 team at the 2005 World Youth Championship. He earned his first senior cap for the United States in the 2007 Copa America against Argentina on June 28, 2007. Wynne was an integral part of the U-23 side that earned qualification to the Beijing Olympics, which also included, then Toronto FC teammate, Maurice Edu.

Wynne also was a starter on the U.S. Men's 2008 Olympic soccer team. Wynne received his second cap for the senior team on January 24, 2009, against Sweden, drawing a penalty that Sacha Kljestan converted.

=== After retirement ===
After retirement, Wynne moved to Quincy, Illinois, where he served as the assistant coach of the men's soccer team at John Wood Community College until 2021. He studied yoga, personal training and nutrition.

== Career statistics ==
Appearances and goals by club, season and competition
Club	Season	League			National cup (Note: Includes U.S. Open Cup, Canadian Championship)		MLS Playoffs		North America		Total	
Club	Season	Division	Apps	Goals	Apps	Goals	Apps	Goals	Apps	Goals	Apps	Goals
New York Red Bulls	MLS	2006	28	0	0	0	2	0	—		30	0
New York Red Bulls	MLS	2007	1	0	—		0	0	—		1	0
New York Red Bulls	Total		29	0	0	0	2	0	0	0	31	0
Toronto FC	MLS	2007	22	0	—		—		—		22	0
Toronto FC	MLS	2008	24	2	4	0	—		—		28	2
Toronto FC	MLS	2009	21	0	2	0	—		2	0	25	0
Toronto FC	Total		67	2	6	0	0	0	2	0	75	2
Colorado Rapids	MLS	2010	27	0	0	0	4	0	—		31	0
Colorado Rapids	MLS	2011	29	0	0	0	3	0	3	0	32	0
Colorado Rapids	MLS	2012	28	0	0	0	—		—		28	0
Colorado Rapids	MLS	2013	28	0	1	0	1	0	—		28	0
Colorado Rapids	MLS	2014	6	0	—		—		—		6	0
Colorado Rapids	Total		118	0	1	0	8	0	3	0	130	0
San Jose Earthquakes	MLS	2015	33	0	0	0	0	0	0	0	33	0
San Jose Earthquakes	MLS	2016	32	0	0	0	0	0	0	0	32	0
San Jose Earthquakes	MLS	2017	0	0	0	0	0	0	0	0	0	0
San Jose Earthquakes	Total		65	0	0	0	0	0	0	0	65	0
Career total			279	2	7	0	10	0	5	0	301	2

== Honors ==
Toronto FC

- Canadian Championship: 2009

Colorado Rapids

- Major League Soccer Eastern Conference Championship: 2010
- Major League Soccer MLS Cup: 2010
