= 1989 Major League Baseball All-Star Game =

1989 American baseball competition

	1	2	3	4	5	6	7	8	9	R	H	E
National League	2	0	0	0	0	0	0	1	0	3	9	1
American League	2	1	2	0	0	0	0	0	X	5	12	0
- Date: July 11, 1989
- Venue: Anaheim Stadium
- City: Anaheim, California
- Managers: Tommy Lasorda (LA); Tony La Russa (OAK)
- MVP: Bo Jackson (KC)
- Attendance: 64,036
- Ceremonial first pitch: Jimmie Reese
- Television: NBC
- TV announcers: Vin Scully, Tom Seaver and Ronald Reagan (first inning only)
- Radio: CBS
- Radio announcers: Brent Musburger, Jerry Coleman and Johnny Bench

The 1989 Major League Baseball All-Star Game was the 60th playing of the midsummer classic between the all-stars of the American League (AL) and National League (NL), the two leagues comprising Major League Baseball. The game was held on July 11, 1989, at Anaheim Stadium in Anaheim, California, the home of the California Angels of the American League. The game is noted for being the first in All-Star Game history to include the designated hitter. The game resulted in the American League defeating the National League 5–3. The game is remembered for Bo Jackson's monstrous lead-off home run to center field. Jackson was named the game's MVP. The game also featured former U.S. President and former baseball announcer Ronald Reagan sharing the NBC broadcast booth with Vin Scully for the first inning.

The pregame ceremonies featured Disney characters joining this year's players in sprinting onto the field for the introduction of the starting lineups. Mike Schmidt of the Philadelphia Phillies, who had retired on May 29, was still elected by the fans as the starting third baseman for the NL All-Star team. Schmidt decided not to play, but he did participate in the game's opening ceremony in uniform. Oakland Athletics slugger Jose Canseco, the reigning American League Most Valuable Player was voted by the fans as one of the starting outfielders despite not playing a single game on the first half of the season due to injury. His place in the roster was taken by Ruben Sierra. Doc Severinsen later led The Tonight Show Band in the playing of the Canadian and U.S. national anthems. Severinsen and The Tonight Show Band's performance of the U.S. National Anthem was the last non-vocal performance of the Anthem at the All-Star Game to date. The ceremonial first pitch was thrown by longtime Angels coach Jimmie Reese.

This was the second All-Star Game to be played in Anaheim, which last hosted the Midsummer Classic in 1967. It would return to the by-now renovated and renamed Angel Stadium of Anaheim in 2010.

== Rosters ==
Players in italics have since been inducted into the National Baseball Hall of Fame.

=== National League ===
Starters
Position	Player	Team	All-Star Games
P	Rick Reuschel	Giants	3
C	Benito Santiago	Padres	1
1B	Will Clark	Giants	2
2B	Ryne Sandberg	Cubs	6
3B	Howard Johnson	Mets	1
SS	Ozzie Smith	Cardinals	9
OF	Eric Davis	Reds	2
OF	Tony Gwynn	Padres	5
OF	Kevin Mitchell	Giants	1
DH	Pedro Guerrero	Cardinals	5

Pitchers
Position	Player	Team	All-Star Games
P	Tim Burke	Expos	1
P	Mark Davis	Padres	2
P	John Franco	Reds	3
P	Orel Hershiser	Dodgers	3
P	Jay Howell	Dodgers	3
P	Mike Scott	Astros	3
P	John Smoltz	Braves	1
P	Rick Sutcliffe	Cubs	3
P	Mitch Williams	Cubs	1

Reserves
Position	Player	Team	All-Star Games
C	Tony Peña	Cardinals	5
C	Mike Scioscia	Dodgers	1
1B	Glenn Davis	Astros	2
2B	Willie Randolph	Dodgers	6
3B	Bobby Bonilla	Pirates	2
3B	Mike Schmidt	Phillies	12
3B	Tim Wallach	Expos	4
SS	Barry Larkin	Reds	2
OF	Vince Coleman	Cardinals	2
OF	Andre Dawson	Cubs	6
OF	Von Hayes	Phillies	1
OF	Darryl Strawberry	Mets	6

=== American League ===
Starters
Position	Player	Team	All-Star Games
P	Dave Stewart	Athletics	1
C	Terry Steinbach	Athletics	2
1B	Mark McGwire	Athletics	3
2B	Julio Franco	Rangers	1
3B	Wade Boggs	Red Sox	5
SS	Cal Ripken Jr.	Orioles	7
OF	Bo Jackson	Royals	1
OF	Kirby Puckett	Twins	4
OF	Rubén Sierra	Rangers	1
DH	Harold Baines	White Sox	4

Pitchers
Position	Player	Team	All-Star Games
P	Chuck Finley	Angels	1
P	Mark Gubicza	Royals	2
P	Mike Henneman	Tigers	1
P	Doug Jones	Indians	2
P	Mike Moore	Athletics	1
P	Dan Plesac	Brewers	3
P	Jeff Russell	Rangers	2
P	Nolan Ryan	Rangers	8
P	Greg Swindell	Indians	1

Reserves
Position	Player	Team	All-Star Games
C	Mickey Tettleton	Orioles	1
1B	Don Mattingly	Yankees	6
2B	Steve Sax	Yankees	4
3B	Gary Gaetti	Twins	2
3B	Kelly Gruber	Blue Jays	1
SS	Tony Fernández	Blue Jays	3
OF	José Canseco	Athletics	3
OF	Mike Greenwell	Red Sox	2
OF	Devon White	Angels	1
DH	Jeffrey Leonard	Mariners	2

== Game ==
=== Coaching staff ===
Description	NL	AL
Managers	Tommy Lasorda	Tony La Russa
Coaches	Jack McKeon	Joe Morgan
Coaches	Buck Rodgers	Doug Rader
Honorary Captains	Don Drysdale	Carl Yastrzemski

=== Umpires ===
Home Plate	Jim Evans (AL)
First Base	Bob Engel (NL)
Second Base	Terry Cooney (AL)
Third Base	Jerry Crawford (NL)
Left Field	John Hirschbeck(AL)
Right Field	Gerry Davis (NL)

=== Starting lineups ===
National League				American League			
Order	Player	Team	Position	Order	Player	Team	Position
1	Ozzie Smith	Cardinals	SS	1	Bo Jackson	Royals	LF
2	Tony Gwynn	Padres	RF	2	Wade Boggs	Red Sox	3B
3	Will Clark	Giants	1B	3	Kirby Puckett	Twins	CF
4	Kevin Mitchell	Giants	LF	4	Harold Baines	White Sox	DH
5	Eric Davis	Reds	CF	5	Julio Franco	Rangers	2B
6	Howard Johnson	Mets	3B	6	Cal Ripken Jr.	Orioles	SS
7	Pedro Guerrero	Cardinals	DH	7	Rubén Sierra	Rangers	RF
8	Ryne Sandberg	Cubs	2B	8	Mark McGwire	Athletics	1B
9	Benito Santiago	Padres	C	9	Terry Steinbach	Athletics	C
	Rick Reuschel	Giants	P		Dave Stewart	Athletics	P

=== Game summary ===
Tuesday, July 11, 1989 5:35 pm (PT) at Anaheim Stadium in Anaheim, California
Team	1	2	3	4	5	6	7	8	9	R	H	E
National League	2	0	0	0	0	0	0	1	0	3	9	1
American League	2	1	2	0	0	0	0	0	-	5	12	0
WP: Nolan Ryan (1-0) LP: John Smoltz (0-1) Sv: Doug Jones (1); Home runs: NL: None; AL: Wade Boggs (1), Bo Jackson (1)

The NL got off to a fast start off Dave Stewart in the first on RBI singles by Kevin Mitchell and Howard Johnson. The AL would counter in spectacular fashion in their half when game MVP Bo Jackson golfed the second pitch by Rick Reuschel, a low sinker, out in deep center. Wade Boggs followed with a homer to tie it.

The AL took the lead the very next inning when Jackson beat out a double play grounder, scoring Rubén Sierra. Jackson then stole second and joined Willie Mays in the second 1960 All-Star Game (from 1959 to 1962, two All-Star Games were played) as the only players to have a home run and a stolen base in the same All-Star game. The AL expanded their lead to 5–2 in the third on RBI singles by Harold Baines and Sierra. The NL would get no closer than a run in the eighth when Von Hayes singled home Glenn Davis.
