= 1989 Major League Baseball season =

1989 MLB season
- League: Major League Baseball
- Sport: Baseball
- Duration: April 3 – October 28, 1989
- Games: 162
- Teams: 26
- TV partner(s): ABC, NBC

Draft
- Top draft pick: Ben McDonald
- Picked by: Baltimore Orioles

Regular season
- Season MVP: NL: Kevin Mitchell (SF); AL: Robin Yount (MIL)

Postseason
- AL champions: Oakland Athletics
- AL runners-up: Toronto Blue Jays
- NL champions: San Francisco Giants
- NL runners-up: Chicago Cubs

World Series
- Champions: Oakland Athletics
- Runners-up: San Francisco Giants
- World Series MVP: Dave Stewart (OAK)

MLB seasons
- ← 1988 1990 →

Locations of teams for the 1989–1990 American League seasons
West East
Locations of teams for the 1977–1992 National League seasons
West East

The 1989 Major League Baseball season saw the Oakland Athletics win their first World Series title since 1974.

The American League saw the Oakland Athletics and the Toronto Blue Jays as the AL West and AL East division winners, respectively. Oakland dominated the entire American League with their second straight season of more than 100 wins (including postseason wins) and looked to be a future dynasty. The Blue Jays, powered by their offense, won their division title in the final weekend of the season. The Chicago Cubs and San Francisco Giants stole the spotlight in the National League, but the Giants proved to be more dominant with a strong hitting presence, while the Cubs extended their streak without a World Series championship to 81 years.

== Awards and honors ==
- Baseball Hall of Fame
  - Al Barlick
  - Johnny Bench
  - Red Schoendienst
  - Carl Yastrzemski

Baseball Writers' Association of America Awards
BBWAA Award	National League	American League
Rookie of the Year	Jerome Walton (CHC)	Gregg Olson (BAL)
Cy Young Award	Mark Davis (SD)	Bret Saberhagen (KC)
Manager of the Year	Don Zimmer (CHC)	Frank Robinson (BAL)
Most Valuable Player	Kevin Mitchell (SF)	Robin Yount (MIL)
Gold Glove Awards
Position	National League	American League
Pitcher	Ron Darling (NYM)	Bret Saberhagen (KC)
Catcher	Benito Santiago (SD)	Bob Boone (KC)
First Baseman	Andrés Galarraga (MON)	Don Mattingly (NYY)
Second Baseman	Ryne Sandberg (CHC)	Harold Reynolds (SEA)
Third Baseman	Terry Pendleton (STL)	Gary Gaetti (MIN)
Shortstop	Ozzie Smith (STL)	Tony Fernández (TOR)
Outfielders	Eric Davis (CIN)	Gary Pettis (DET)
Outfielders	Tony Gwynn (SD)	Kirby Puckett (MIN)
Outfielders	Andy Van Slyke (PIT)	Devon White (CAL)
Silver Slugger Awards
Pitcher/Designated Hitter	Don Robinson (SF)	Harold Baines (TEX)/(CWS)
Catcher	Craig Biggio (HOU)	Mickey Tettleton (BAL)
First Baseman	Will Clark (SF)	Fred McGriff (TOR)
Second Baseman	Ryne Sandberg (CHC)	Julio Franco (TEX)
Third Baseman	Howard Johnson (NYM)	Wade Boggs (BOS)
Shortstop	Barry Larkin (CIN)	Cal Ripken Jr. (BAL)
Outfielders	Eric Davis (CIN)	Kirby Puckett (MIN)
Outfielders	Tony Gwynn (SD)	Rubén Sierra (TEX)
Outfielders	Kevin Mitchell (SF)	Robin Yount (MIL)

=== Other awards ===
- Outstanding Designated Hitter Award: Dave Parker (OAK)
- Roberto Clemente Award (Humanitarian): Gary Carter (NYM).
- Rolaids Relief Man Award: Jeff Russell (TEX, American); Mark Davis (SD, National).

=== Player of the Month ===
Month	American League	National League
April	Fred McGriff	Von Hayes
May	Ron Kittle	Will Clark
June	Rubén Sierra	Howard Johnson
July	Robin Yount	Mark Grace
August	George Bell; Nick Esasky	Pedro Guerrero
September	Paul Molitor	Will Clark

=== Pitcher of the Month ===
Month	American League	National League
April	Jeff Ballard	Mark Davis
May	Chuck Finley	Rick Reuschel
June	Mark Gubicza	Mike Scott
July	Mike Moore	Mark Langston
August	Bret Saberhagen	Tom Browning
September	Bret Saberhagen	Tim Belcher

== Statistical leaders ==
Statistic	American League		National League	
AVG	Kirby Puckett MIN	.339	Tony Gwynn SD	.336
HR	Fred McGriff TOR	36	Kevin Mitchell SF	47
RBIs	Rubén Sierra TEX	119	Kevin Mitchell SF	125
Wins	Bret Saberhagen KC	23	Mike Scott HOU	20
ERA	Bret Saberhagen KC	2.16	Scott Garrelts SF	2.28
SO	Nolan Ryan TEX	301	José DeLeón STL	201
SV	Jeff Russell TEX	38	Mark Davis SD	44
SB	Rickey Henderson NYY/OAK	77	Vince Coleman STL	65

== Standings ==
=== American League ===
AL East
Team	W	L	Pct.	GB	Home	Road
Toronto Blue Jays	89	73	.549	—	46‍–‍35	43‍–‍38
Baltimore Orioles	87	75	.537	2	47‍–‍34	40‍–‍41
Boston Red Sox	83	79	.512	6	46‍–‍35	37‍–‍44
Milwaukee Brewers	81	81	.500	8	45‍–‍36	36‍–‍45
New York Yankees	74	87	.460	14½	41‍–‍40	33‍–‍47
Cleveland Indians	73	89	.451	16	41‍–‍40	32‍–‍49
Detroit Tigers	59	103	.364	30	38‍–‍43	21‍–‍60

AL West
Team	W	L	Pct.	GB	Home	Road
Oakland Athletics	99	63	.611	—	54‍–‍27	45‍–‍36
Kansas City Royals	92	70	.568	7	55‍–‍26	37‍–‍44
California Angels	91	71	.562	8	52‍–‍29	39‍–‍42
Texas Rangers	83	79	.512	16	45‍–‍36	38‍–‍43
Minnesota Twins	80	82	.494	19	45‍–‍36	35‍–‍46
Seattle Mariners	73	89	.451	26	40‍–‍41	33‍–‍48
Chicago White Sox	69	92	.429	29½	35‍–‍45	34‍–‍47

=== National League ===
NL East
Team	W	L	Pct.	GB	Home	Road
Chicago Cubs	93	69	.574	—	48‍–‍33	45‍–‍36
New York Mets	87	75	.537	6	51‍–‍30	36‍–‍45
St. Louis Cardinals	86	76	.531	7	46‍–‍35	40‍–‍41
Montreal Expos	81	81	.500	12	44‍–‍37	37‍–‍44
Pittsburgh Pirates	74	88	.457	19	39‍–‍42	35‍–‍46
Philadelphia Phillies	67	95	.414	26	38‍–‍42	29‍–‍53

NL West
Team	W	L	Pct.	GB	Home	Road
San Francisco Giants	92	70	.568	—	53‍–‍28	39‍–‍42
San Diego Padres	89	73	.549	3	46‍–‍35	43‍–‍38
Houston Astros	86	76	.531	6	47‍–‍35	39‍–‍41
Los Angeles Dodgers	77	83	.481	14	44‍–‍37	33‍–‍46
Cincinnati Reds	75	87	.463	17	38‍–‍43	37‍–‍44
Atlanta Braves	63	97	.394	28	33‍–‍46	30‍–‍51

== Postseason ==
=== Bracket ===
League Championship Series (ALCS, NLCS)
East	Toronto	1
West	Oakland	4
East	Chicago Cubs	1
West	San Francisco	4

World Series
AL	Oakland	4
NL	San Francisco	0

== Managers ==
=== American League ===
Team	Manager	Notes
Baltimore Orioles	Frank Robinson	2nd season as Orioles manager
Boston Red Sox	Joe Morgan	
California Angels	Doug Rader	
Chicago White Sox	Jeff Torborg	First season as White Sox manager
Cleveland Indians	Doc Edwards, John Hart	
Detroit Tigers	Sparky Anderson	
Kansas City Royals	John Wathan	
Milwaukee Brewers	Tom Trebelhorn	
Minnesota Twins	Tom Kelly	
New York Yankees	Dallas Green, Bucky Dent	
Oakland Athletics	Tony La Russa	Won World Series
Seattle Mariners	Jim Lefebvre	
Texas Rangers	Bobby Valentine	
Toronto Blue Jays	Jimy Williams, Cito Gaston	Won AL East

=== National League ===
Team	Manager	Notes
Atlanta Braves	Russ Nixon	2nd season as Braves manager
Chicago Cubs	Don Zimmer	Won NL East
Cincinnati Reds	Pete Rose, Tommy Helms	
Houston Astros	Art Howe	First season as Astros manager
Los Angeles Dodgers	Tommy Lasorda	
Montreal Expos	Buck Rodgers	
New York Mets	Davey Johnson	
Philadelphia Phillies	Nick Leyva	First season as Phillies manager
Pittsburgh Pirates	Jim Leyland	
St. Louis Cardinals	Whitey Herzog	
San Diego Padres	Jack McKeon	
San Francisco Giants	Roger Craig	Won National League Pennant

== Home field attendance and payroll ==
Team name	Wins	%±	Home attendance	%±	Per game	Est. payroll	%±
Toronto Blue Jays	89	2.3%	3,375,883	30.1%	41,678	$16,586,666	15.1%
St. Louis Cardinals	86	13.2%	3,080,980	6.5%	37,120	$16,078,833	21.9%
Los Angeles Dodgers	77	−18.1%	2,944,653	−1.2%	36,354	$21,071,562	22.9%
New York Mets	87	−13.0%	2,918,710	−4.5%	36,033	$19,885,071	29.1%
Oakland Athletics	99	−4.8%	2,667,225	16.6%	32,929	$16,314,265	53.1%
California Angels	91	21.3%	2,647,291	13.1%	32,683	$15,097,833	23.2%
Baltimore Orioles	87	61.1%	2,535,208	52.7%	31,299	$10,916,401	−24.1%
Boston Red Sox	83	−6.7%	2,510,012	1.8%	30,988	$18,556,748	26.3%
Chicago Cubs	93	20.8%	2,491,942	19.3%	30,765	$11,918,000	−14.6%
Kansas City Royals	92	9.5%	2,477,700	5.4%	30,589	$18,914,068	27.4%
Minnesota Twins	80	−12.1%	2,277,438	−24.9%	28,117	$16,806,666	26.3%
New York Yankees	74	−12.9%	2,170,485	−17.6%	26,796	$17,114,375	−16.0%
San Francisco Giants	92	10.8%	2,059,701	15.4%	25,428	$15,040,834	17.3%
Texas Rangers	83	18.6%	2,043,993	29.2%	25,234	$11,893,781	86.3%
San Diego Padres	89	7.2%	2,009,031	33.3%	24,803	$15,295,000	42.6%
Cincinnati Reds	75	−13.8%	1,979,320	−4.5%	24,436	$11,717,000	20.8%
Milwaukee Brewers	81	−6.9%	1,970,735	2.5%	24,330	$12,716,000	33.8%
Philadelphia Phillies	67	3.1%	1,861,985	−6.4%	22,987	$10,779,000	−22.5%
Houston Astros	86	4.9%	1,834,908	−5.1%	22,377	$15,579,500	23.2%
Montreal Expos	81	0.0%	1,783,533	20.6%	22,019	$13,807,389	37.4%
Detroit Tigers	59	−33.0%	1,543,656	−25.8%	19,057	$15,669,304	16.7%
Pittsburgh Pirates	74	−12.9%	1,374,141	−26.4%	16,965	$13,992,500	96.3%
Seattle Mariners	73	7.4%	1,298,443	27.0%	16,030	$10,099,500	30.2%
Cleveland Indians	73	−6.4%	1,285,542	−8.9%	15,871	$9,894,500	6.8%
Chicago White Sox	69	−2.8%	1,045,651	−6.3%	13,071	$8,565,410	0.3%
Atlanta Braves	63	16.7%	984,930	16.1%	12,467	$11,180,334	−14.4%

== Television coverage ==
This was the last season under the television contracts with ABC and NBC. MLB signed new deals with CBS and ESPN to begin broadcasting games in 1990.

Network	Day of week	Announcers
ABC	Thursday nights	Al Michaels, Jim Palmer, Tim McCarver, Gary Thorne, Joe Morgan
NBC	Saturday afternoons	Vin Scully, Tom Seaver, Bob Costas, Tony Kubek

== Events ==
- January 9 – Johnny Bench and Carl Yastrzemski are elected to the Hall of Fame by the Baseball Writers' Association of America in their first year of eligibility. Bench was named on 96.4 percent of the ballots, the third-highest figure in history at the time behind Ty Cobb and Hank Aaron.
- February 3 – Bill White, a former MLB player and broadcaster, was elected president of the National League.
- February 28 – Red Schoendienst, a former second baseman and manager of the St. Louis Cardinals, and Al Barlick, a National League umpire for 28 seasons, are elected to the Hall of Fame by the Special Veterans Committee.
- April 3 – Outfielder Ken Griffey Jr. debuts with the Seattle Mariners and hits the first pitch he sees for a double (thrown by Dave Stewart of the Oakland Athletics). Griffey's father, Ken Griffey Sr., is still active with the Cincinnati Reds, making them the first father-son combination to play simultaneously in Major League Baseball (Griffey, Sr. would join the Mariners the following year, becoming first father/son combo playing in the same Major League game).
- May 7 – Chicago mayor Richard M. Daley presides over the groundbreaking of the new Comiskey Park.
- May 28 – George Bell ends the Toronto Blue Jays' twelve-year stay at Exhibition Stadium with a walk-off home run to win the Jays' final game there with a 7–5 win over the Chicago White Sox, the same team the Jays' faced in their first game at Exhibition Stadium and in franchise history twelve years earlier.
- May 29 – Mike Schmidt of the Philadelphia Phillies calls a press conference and tearfully announces his retirement, effective immediately. Nonetheless, he will be voted to start the All-Star Game, and is permitted to appear in uniform.
- June 3 – At the Astrodome, the Houston Astros and Los Angeles Dodgers engage in a 22-inning battle lasting seven hours and fourteen minutes, setting a new record for the longest night game in National League history. Houston's ace pitcher Mike Scott, never known for his batting abilities, surprises everyone by coming through with a walk-off sacrifice fly to give the Astros a 5–4 victory. Amazingly, the two teams meet again just hours later and wage another marathon, with Houston once again emerging victorious, 7–6 in 13 innings.
- June 5 – Just eight days after leaving Exhibition Stadium, the Toronto Blue Jays inaugurate their brand-new home, SkyDome, the first Major League stadium with a fully retractable roof. As in the final game at Exhibition Stadium, George Bell hits a home run, but the Blue Jays fall to the Milwaukee Brewers, 5–3.
- June 8 – At Veterans Stadium, the visiting Pittsburgh Pirates score 10 runs in the top of the first inning against the Philadelphia Phillies, three of which come on a Barry Bonds home run. As the Phillies come to bat in the bottom of the first, Pirate broadcaster Jim Rooker says on the air, "If we lose this game, I'll walk home." Both Von Hayes and Steve Jeltz hit two home runs to trigger the comeback for the Phillies, who finally tie the game in the 8th on a wild pitch, then take the lead on Darren Daulton's two-run single and go on to win 15–11. After the season, Rooker conducts a 300-plus-mile charity walk from Philadelphia to Pittsburgh.
- June 24 – Vince Coleman of the St. Louis Cardinals broke the major league record of 38 consecutive stolen bases set by Dave Lopes in 1975 by stealing his 39th stolen base against the Pittsburgh Pirates.
- July 4 – At Veterans Stadium, Cincinnati Reds pitcher Tom Browning, having already pitched a perfect game a year earlier, misses becoming the first pitcher in Major League history to throw two perfect games. Dickie Thon's leadoff double in the ninth breaks up this bid; Thon later scores on a Steve Jeltz single. John Franco then relieves Browning and induces Lenny Dykstra to hit into a game-ending double play for a 2–1 Reds victory.
- July 5 – Mark McGwire of the Oakland Athletics hits his 100th career home run. However, the Kansas City Royals come out on top by a score of 12–9 in 11 innings.
- July 11 – At Anaheim Stadium, Bo Jackson and Wade Boggs lead off the bottom of the first inning with back-to-back home runs off Rick Reuschel to spark the American League to a 5–3 win over the National League in the All-Star Game. Jackson earns MVP honors.
- July 26 – Vince Coleman of the St. Louis Cardinals set a major league record by stealing his 50th consecutive base against the Chicago Cubs. Coincidentally, the streak began on September 16, 1988 also against the Chicago Cubs.
- August 3 – The Cincinnati Reds set a Major League record for the most singles in an inning, with 12 in the 1st inning against the Houston Astros at Riverfront Stadium in an 18–2 victory.
- August 4 – Dave Stieb, pitching for the Toronto Blue Jays, loses a perfect game with two outs in the ninth inning when Roberto Kelly of the New York Yankees doubles and later scores on a single by Steve Sax. Stieb wins a 2–1 two-hitter, but it is the third no-hitter that he has lost in the ninth inning in the past 11 months.
- August 15 – San Francisco Giants pitcher Dave Dravecky, making a comeback from cancer in his deltoid muscle, snaps his humerus bone while throwing a pitch to Tim Raines in the sixth inning of a game against the Montreal Expos. The bone had been frozen as part of surgery for his cancer the previous year. Dravecky's cancer would return after the Giants' pennant win, forcing his retirement and the eventual amputation of his arm.
- August 21 – Cal Ripken Jr. hits his 200th career home run, helping his Baltimore Orioles beat the Milwaukee Brewers, 5–0.
- August 22 – Nolan Ryan of the Texas Rangers becomes the first (and so far only) pitcher in Major League history to record 5,000 career strikeouts. Ryan whiffs Rickey Henderson in the top of the fifth inning of an eventual 2–1 loss to the Oakland Athletics to reach the milestone.
- August 23 – The Los Angeles Dodgers and Montreal Expos play a twenty-two inning game without a single base on balls, setting a Major League record which still stands.
- August 24 – Commissioner A. Bartlett Giamatti announces in a press conference that Pete Rose is banned from baseball for life, in the wake of evidence that has come to light regarding Rose's gambling history.
- September 1 – Commissioner A. Bartlett Giamatti unexpectedly dies of a heart attack.
- September 14 – Jeff Reardon of the Minnesota Twins earns his 30th save of the season in a 2–0 win over the Toronto Blue Jays. He becomes the first pitcher to save 30 games in five consecutive seasons.
- September 26 – The Chicago Cubs clinch the National League East division title with a 3–2 win over the Expos in Montreal.
- September 27 – The Oakland Athletics clinch their second straight American League West title with a 5–0 blanking of the Texas Rangers.
- September 27 – Despite a 1–0 loss to the arch-rival Los Angeles Dodgers, the San Francisco Giants secure their second National League West crown in three years when the second-place San Diego Padres lose a 2–1 heartbreaker in 13 innings to the Cincinnati Reds.
- September 30 – The Toronto Blue Jays win the American League East title with a narrow 4–3 victory over the Baltimore Orioles, whom they had overtaken for first place on September 1.
- October 3 – Kirby Puckett wins an unlikely (at the time) American League batting title, taking advantage of an off-year by Boston's Wade Boggs due to marital issues. Puckett clinches the title in Seattle on a double in the final game of the season, finishing with a final average of .339.
- October 9 – After 43 years on the air, NBC concludes its run as the #1 over-the-air television broadcaster for Major League Baseball games. Game 5 of the NLCS between the San Francisco Giants and Chicago Cubs is the final baseball broadcast shown on the network (it would return to baseball broadcasting five years later, with the establishment of The Baseball Network).
- October 17 – Game 3 of the World Series is postponed due to the Loma Prieta earthquake, which struck immediately before the game was set to begin. It would be rescheduled for ten days later, on October 27.
- October 28 – The Oakland Athletics complete a four-game sweep of the San Francisco Giants in the World Series, the first Series sweep since 1976. Oakland pitcher Dave Stewart, who won two games, is named MVP. It is also the latest in the calendar year that a World Series game has ever been played up to this point; it was also the last MLB game broadcast by ABC for five years.
- November 20 – Milwaukee Brewers outfielder Robin Yount is named American League MVP for the second time. With his 1982 MVP Award coming in a year he played shortstop, he becomes the third player to win two such awards while playing different positions, after Hank Greenberg and Stan Musial.

== Movies ==
- Major League
- Field of Dreams

== Deaths ==
- January 9 – Bill Terry, 90, Hall of Fame first baseman for the New York Giants who batted .341 lifetime and was the last National Leaguer to hit .400 (.401 in 1930); also managed Giants to 1933 World Series title
- January 21 – Carl Furillo, 66, All-Star right fielder for the Dodgers who batted .300 five times and won 1953 batting title
- January 22 – Willie Wells, 83, All-Star shortstop of the Negro leagues who combined batting power with excellent defense
- January 23 – George Case, 73, All-Star outfielder for the Washington Senators who led the AL in stolen bases six times
- February 17 – Lefty Gómez, 80, Hall of Fame pitcher for the New York Yankees who had four 20-win seasons and a .649 career winning percentage; led AL in strikeouts three times and in wins and ERA twice each, and was 6–0 in World Series
- April 8 – Bus Saidt, 68, sportswriter who covered the Phillies, Mets and Yankees for the Trenton Times since 1967; previously a minor league broadcaster
- April 16 – Jocko Conlan, 89, Hall of Fame umpire who worked in the National League from 1941 to 1964, including five World Series and six All-Star Games
- May 17 – Specs Toporcer, 90, infielder for the Cardinals for eight seasons, and the first non-pitcher to wear eyeglasses; later a minor league manager
- June 8 – Bibb Falk, 90, left fielder who batted .314 with White Sox and Indians; coached Texas to two College World Series titles
- June 8 – Emil Verban, 73, All-Star second baseman for four NL teams who hit .412 in the 1944 World Series
- June 15 – Judy Johnson, 89, Hall of Fame third baseman of the Negro leagues who became the major leagues' first black coach, and later a scout
- July 18 – Donnie Moore, 35, All-Star relief pitcher who never overcame the disappointment from giving up a pivotal home run in the 1986 ALCS
- August 17 – Fred Frankhouse, 85, All-Star pitcher for the Cardinals, Braves and Dodgers who ended Carl Hubbell's 24-game winning streak in 1937
- August 30 – Joe Collins, 66, first baseman for the New York Yankees who hit four World Series homers
- September 1 – A. Bartlett Giamatti, 51, commissioner of baseball since April, previously NL president since 1986, known for numerous writings on the sport as well as his banishment of Pete Rose
