= Paul Kilgus =

American baseball player (born 1962)

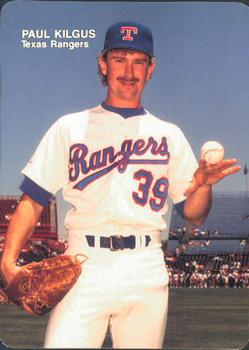
- Pitcher
- Born: February 2, 1962 (age 64); Bowling Green, Kentucky, U.S.
- Batted: Left Threw: Left

MLB debut
- June 7, 1987, for the Texas Rangers

Last MLB appearance
- October 3, 1993, for the St. Louis Cardinals

MLB statistics
- Win–loss record: 21–34
- Earned run average: 4.19
- Strikeouts: 251
- Stats at Baseball Reference

Teams
- Texas Rangers (1987–1988); Chicago Cubs (1989); Toronto Blue Jays (1990); Baltimore Orioles (1991); St. Louis Cardinals (1993)

Paul Nelson Kilgus (born February 2, 1962) is an American former professional baseball pitcher. He played in Major League Baseball (MLB) for the Texas Rangers, Chicago Cubs, Toronto Blue Jays, Baltimore Orioles, and St. Louis Cardinals.

== Early life ==
Kilgus is a 1984 graduate of the University of Kentucky. In 1982, he played collegiate summer baseball with the Chatham A's of the Cape Cod Baseball League. He was drafted by the Texas Rangers in the 43rd round of the 1984 amateur draft.

== Sources ==
- Career statistics from Baseball Reference · Baseball Reference (Minors) · Retrosheet · Baseball Almanac
