= Mark Grace =

American baseball player (born 1964)

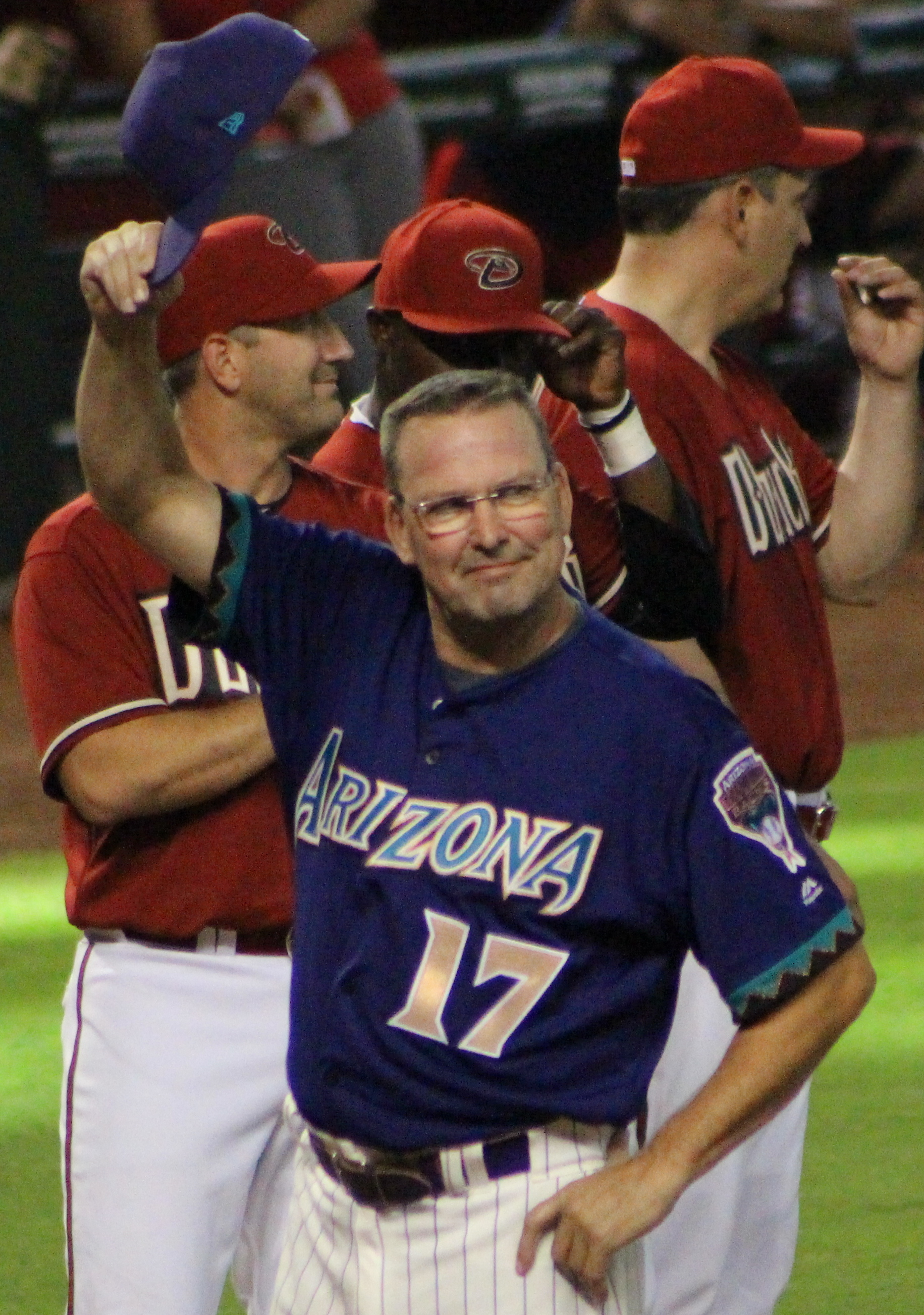
- Grace at the 2017 Arizona Diamondbacks Alumni Game
- First baseman
- Born: June 28, 1964 (age 62); Winston-Salem, North Carolina, U.S.
- Batted: Left Threw: Left

MLB debut
- May 2, 1988, for the Chicago Cubs

Last MLB appearance
- September 28, 2003, for the Arizona Diamondbacks

MLB statistics
- Batting average: .303
- Hits: 2,445
- Home runs: 173
- Runs batted in: 1,146
- Stats at Baseball Reference

Teams
- As player: Chicago Cubs (1988–2000); Arizona Diamondbacks (2001–2003); As coach: Arizona Diamondbacks (2015–2016)

Career highlights and awards
- 3× All-Star (1993, 1995, 1997); World Series champion (2001); 4× Gold Glove Award (1992, 1993, 1995, 1996); Chicago Cubs Hall of Fame

Mark Eugene Grace (born June 28, 1964) is an American former professional baseball first baseman, who played 16 seasons in Major League Baseball (MLB) for the Chicago Cubs and Arizona Diamondbacks. He was named an All-Star three times during his career.

Grace was drafted by the Cubs in the 1985 draft. After spending three years in the minor leagues, he became the starting first baseman of the team in the 1988 season, and he batted .296 in 134 games of his first season to finish second in Rookie of the Year voting. He had his first of nine seasons hitting .300 the following year and soon became a reliable hitting presence for the Cubs. He earned three Gold Glove awards in a four-year span from 1992 to 1995 and led the NL in doubles in 1995 with 51. In the decade of the 1990s, he collected 1,754 hits, more than any other player in that same time. He signed with the Diamondbacks as a free agent prior to the 2001 season. In the 2001 postseason, only his third appearance as a player, Grace batted .286 and played an integral part of the run to the World Series, which saw hit a leadoff single in the bottom of the 9th inning in Game 7, where Arizona eventually rallied to win the championship. He played two further seasons with the team before retiring in 2003. The Cubs inducted him into their team Hall of Fame in 2023.

Grace batted and threw left-handed; he wore jersey number 28 and 17 during his rookie season of 1988. He kept number 17 for the remainder of his career. After his playing career ended, he became a television commentator.

== Career ==
=== Amateur career ===
Grace played high school baseball and basketball at Tustin High School in Tustin, California. After graduating from high school in 1982, he attended Saddleback College before transferring to San Diego State University to play for the San Diego State Aztecs. At the age of 19, he was drafted in the 15th round by the Minnesota Twins but did not sign.

=== Chicago Cubs ===
The Chicago Cubs selected Grace in the 1985 Major League Baseball draft. He spent three years playing in the Cubs farm system before making his major league debut May 2, 1988.

Grace starred on Cubs teams that included Ryne Sandberg, Andre Dawson, Shawon Dunston and Sammy Sosa and was a consistent, steady hitter, compiling 2,445 hits and more than 500 doubles during his 16-year career and for a few years batted clean-up for the Cubs. He had a career on-base percentage of .383 and collected four Gold Glove Awards and was a three-time All-Star (1993, 1995, 1997). Grace collected the most hits (1,754) and doubles (364) of any player in the 1990s. Grace and Pete Rose are the only Major League Baseball players to lead a decade in hits and not be in the Baseball Hall of Fame.

Grace helped lead the Cubs to the NL East division title in 1989 and the NL wild card in 1998. In the 1989 NLCS, Grace batted .647 in the five-game contest with a home run and three doubles, while driving in 8 of the 16 total runs scored by the Cubs in the series.

Grace led the team in average (.325), OBP (.393), hits (193), walks (71), doubles (39), and RBI (98 – a career high) in 1993 and was selected as an alternate to the NL All-Star team for the first time in his career. He also hit for the cycle on May 9 that year, with no other Cub hitting for the cycle again until Carson Kelly did so on March 31, 2025. In 1995, Grace hit .326/.395/.516 and hit 51 doubles (which led the NL). He was once again named to the NL All-Star team.

The song that played most frequently on the Wrigley Field organ prior to a Grace at bat was "Taking Care of Business", which Grace explained was due to his bit part in a Jim Belushi film of the same name.

=== Arizona Diamondbacks ===
Grace signed with the Arizona Diamondbacks on December 8, 2000, with a $6 million, two-year contract after the Cubs declined to offer salary arbitration. The deal included a mutual $3 million option year in 2003. He received $5.3 million in his last season with the Cubs but accepted less money for the opportunity to live year-round at his home in suburban Scottsdale, Arizona with his family. "For me to remain a Cub, the Cubs would have wanted to want me back and the Cubs would have had to win", Grace said at the time. "Neither of those happened and I'm one proud Diamondback now."

Grace wore his familiar number 17 in Arizona where he played for three more seasons, including helping the Diamondbacks win the 2001 World Series. Having never even visited Yankee Stadium, he belted a home run there in Game 4 of the series. In Game 7, Grace led off the bottom of the 9th inning with a single — his third of the game — off Yankee pitcher Mariano Rivera, which rallied the Arizona Diamondbacks to a come-from-behind victory for the franchise's first championship.

During a 19–1 defeat by the Los Angeles Dodgers in September 2002, Grace pitched one inning of relief. He surrendered one run on catcher David Ross's first career home run. Grace also impersonated teammate Mike Fetters, who from the stretch would take a deep breath and then quickly turned his head towards the catcher.

On September 26, 2003, Grace announced his retirement from baseball.

=== Coaching ===
Grace has stated a desire to manage a major league team at some point. He was considered for the Diamondbacks' managerial position following the 2004 season, but the Diamondbacks hired Bob Melvin instead.

Grace spent 2014 as hitting coach for the Diamondbacks' Class A Short Season affiliate Hillsboro Hops of the Northwest League. In 2015, he was promoted to the Diamondbacks to be their hitting coach. He was fired after the 2016 season.

== Broadcasting career ==
After his retirement as a player, Grace continued his involvement in the game as a television color commentator for the Diamondbacks and for Fox Saturday Baseball. Grace used off-the-wall terms—such as "slumpbuster", "never-say-die-mondbacks", and "Gas!"—during broadcasts. He was paired with Thom Brennaman on television from 2004 to 2006, and was paired with Daron Sutton from 2007 to 2012.

Grace also agreed to a deal with Fox Sports in 2007. He originally rotated between the studio and the number three booth. He was then promoted to the number two booth with Thom Brennaman for the 2008, 2009, 2010 and 2011 seasons before leaving the network at the end of the regular season. He was replaced by Eric Karros who had worked on the number three team with Kenny Albert.

On August 24, 2012, Grace requested an indefinite leave of absence from the booth, and at the end of the 2012 season, the team announced that he would not be returning for the 2013 season.

In February 2017, Grace was named as a baseball analyst for Diamondbacks games by Fox Sports Arizona.

In February 2020, Grace was hired as an analyst for select Cubs games on Marquee Sports Network. Grace would continue his role with the Diamondbacks as the lead color commentator on Fox Sports Arizona.

== Personal life ==
Grace was known to smoke cigarettes before and after Cubs games, and reportedly at times, during games in the clubhouse.

On August 3, 2006, Grace led the Wrigley Field crowd in singing "Take Me Out to the Ball Game" during the seventh-inning stretch of the second game of a doubleheader between the Cubs and Diamondbacks; his appearance helped to improve his relationship with the Cubs, which had been strained since he left the team after the 2000 season.

Grace became eligible for the National Baseball Hall of Fame in 2009; 75% of the vote was necessary for induction, and 5% was necessary to stay on future ballots. Grace received 4.1% of the vote and was dropped from further ballots.

Grace's ex-wife, Michelle, was married to Ray Liotta from 1997 to 2004; they had met at a Cubs game. Grace is divorced from his second wife, Tanya, who starred on the VH1 show Baseball Wives.

Grace lived in Antioch, Tennessee, during a period of his childhood years. He currently resides in Paradise Valley, Arizona, with his sons.

=== Legal history ===
Grace has been arrested twice for driving under the influence; once in May 2011 and once in August 2012.

On October 3, 2012, a grand jury in Arizona indicted Grace on four felony counts stemming from his August 23, 2012 arrest in Scottsdale on suspicion of driving under the influence, driving with a suspended license and without an interlock device. The Diamondbacks announced the following day that Grace would not return to his television broadcasting duties with the club. He subsequently pleaded guilty and was sentenced to four months in jail on January 31, 2013. The sentence included work-release jail time as well as two years of supervised probation. An interlock device was required to be installed in his vehicle for six months.

== See also ==
- List of Major League Baseball career hits leaders
- List of Major League Baseball career doubles leaders
- List of Major League Baseball career runs scored leaders
- List of Major League Baseball career runs batted in leaders
- List of Major League Baseball annual doubles leaders
- List of Major League Baseball players to hit for the cycle

Awards and achievements
Preceded by Mark McGwire	Topps Rookie All-Star First Baseman; 1988	Succeeded by Carlos Martínez
Preceded by Howard Johnson	National League Player of the Month; July 1989	Succeeded by Pedro Guerrero
Preceded by Andújar Cedeño	Hitting for the cycle May 9, 1993	Succeeded by Jay Buhner
