= Kevin Mitchell (baseball) =

American baseball player (born 1962)

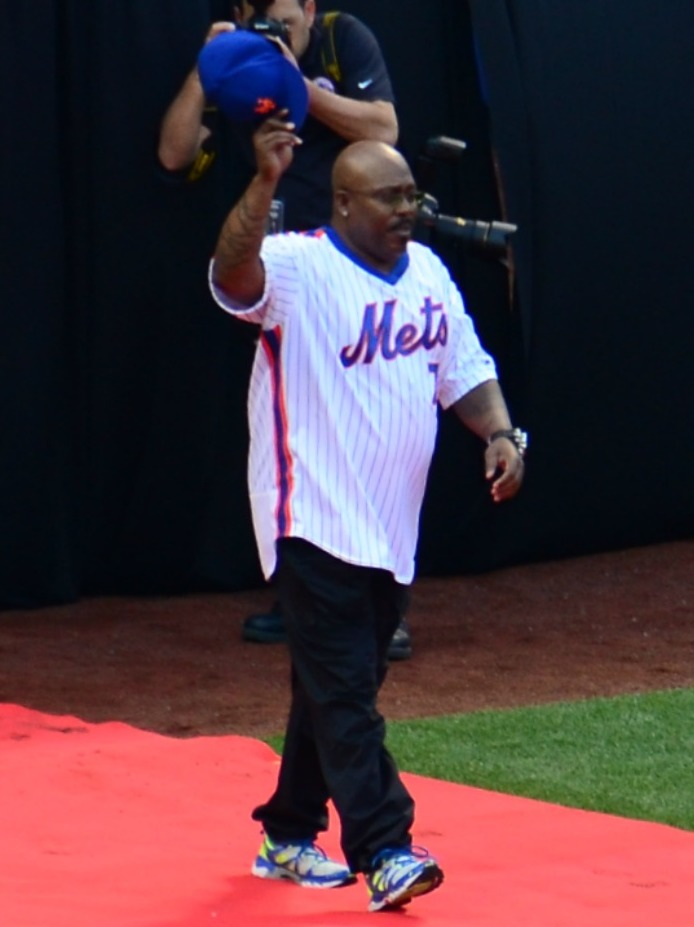
- Mitchell in 2016
- Left fielder
- Born: January 13, 1962 (age 64); San Diego, California, U.S.
- Batted: Right Threw: Right

Professional debut
- MLB: September 4, 1984, for the New York Mets
- NPB: April 1, 1995, for the Fukuoka Daiei Hawks

Last appearance
- NPB: August 8, 1995, for the Fukuoka Daiei Hawks
- MLB: August 3, 1998, for the Oakland Athletics

MLB statistics
- Batting average: .284
- Home runs: 234
- Runs batted in: 760

NPB statistics
- Batting average: .300
- Home runs: 8
- Runs batted in: 28
- Stats at Baseball Reference

Teams
- New York Mets (1984, 1986); San Diego Padres (1987); San Francisco Giants (1987–1991); Seattle Mariners (1992); Cincinnati Reds (1993–1994); Fukuoka Daiei Hawks (1995); Boston Red Sox (1996); Cincinnati Reds (1996); Cleveland Indians (1997); Oakland Athletics (1998)

Career highlights and awards
- 2× All-Star (1989, 1990); World Series champion (1986); NL MVP (1989); Silver Slugger Award (1989); NL home run leader (1989); NL RBI leader (1989); San Francisco Giants Wall of Fame

Kevin Darnell Mitchell (born January 13, 1962) is an American former professional baseball left fielder who played in Major League Baseball (MLB) and Nippon Professional Baseball from 1984 to 1998. Mitchell was a two-time MLB All-Star and won the National League Most Valuable Player Award and Silver Slugger Award in 1989, when he led the league in home runs and runs batted in.

== Early life ==
Mitchell was born and raised in San Diego to Alma Mitchell, who worked as an electrician with the US Navy. Alma separated from Mitchell's father, Earl, when Mitchell was two years old. He was raised by his mother and paternal grandmother, Josie Whitfield, who encouraged his participation in sports. Because Mitchell struggled academically, he attended several high schools in San Diego including Lincoln High School, Clairemont High School and Crawford High School, where he claimed to have played water polo. Although he has been credited with graduating from Clairemont and has claimed to have been a high school football star there, Mitchell only attended the school for two months in 1978. He was reportedly involved in street gangs as a youth, but has claimed he was never himself a member; he also claimed to have been shot three times in his youth. His stepbrother, Donald, was killed in a gang fight.

Mitchell reportedly did not play high school baseball. He was signed by the New York Mets as an undrafted free agent following an open tryout at Grossmont College. He was given a $1,500 signing bonus plus $600 monthly in salary.

== Playing career ==
=== New York Mets ===
In Amazin', Peter Golenbock's oral history of the New York Mets, Hall of Fame catcher Gary Carter said he gave Mitchell the nickname "World" for his ability to play in the infield and outfield. Carter spoke fondly of Mitchell's talents. Mitchell made his major league debut on September 4, 1984, against the St. Louis Cardinals, appearing as a pinch hitter and flying out in his only plate appearance. He batted .214 with an RBI in seven games to finish the 1984 season.

While playing in the Mexican Pacific League for the Naranjeros de Hermosillo in the mid-1980s, Mitchell was hit in the mouth by an object thrown by a fan and lost a tooth which he eventually replaced with a gold prosthetic. Later that season, when the team was playing in Tijuana, Mitchell abandoned the team and walked home across the border to San Diego.

After spending the 1985 season in the minor leagues, Mitchell returned to the Mets in 1986, batting .277 with 12 home runs and 43 RBI in 108 games. In the tenth inning of Game 6 of the 1986 World Series, with the Mets trailing and two outs, Gary Carter singled to keep the game alive. Mitchell was then sent in to pinch hit for Rick Aguilera and also singled, extending the rally. He would eventually score the tying run on Bob Stanley's wild pitch to Mookie Wilson. The Mets went on to win the game and series, giving Mitchell his only World Series ring.

In a July 2007 radio interview with San Francisco sports talk radio station KNBR, Mitchell disputed that he was out of uniform at the time, and stated that he never wore a cup, even when playing infield. When asked why he never wore a cup, Mitchell responded, "I couldn’t find one big enough for my junk." The interviewer then commented that maybe the increased mobility helped Mitchell to make the famous 1989 barehanded catch of Ozzie Smith's fly ball.

On December 11, 1986, the Mets traded Mitchell, Shawn Abner, Stan Jefferson, Kevin Armstrong, and Kevin Brown to the San Diego Padres for Kevin McReynolds, Gene Walter, and Adam Ging. Mitchell played for the Padres for the first half of 1987, batting .245 with seven home runs and 26 RBI in 62 games.

=== San Francisco Giants ===
On July 4, 1987, Mitchell was traded to the San Francisco Giants as part of a multi-player trade that also sent pitchers Dave Dravecky and Craig Lefferts to San Francisco in exchange for third baseman Chris Brown and pitchers Keith Comstock, Mark Davis, and Mark Grant. While Dravecky was initially considered to be the key to the trade for the Giants, it was Mitchell who emerged as a star player. He hit .306 with 15 home runs and 44 RBI in 69 games with the Giants following the trade. In 1988, Mitchell hit .251 with 19 home runs and 80 RBI in 148 games.

Most Valuable Player

After two seasons playing primarily at third base, Mitchell had his best season with the Giants in 1989 upon being moved to the outfield. In that season, he batted .291 with a league-best 47 home runs and 125 RBI in 154 games, leading the team to the playoffs and winning the National League's Most Valuable Player award, the first by a Giant since Willie McCovey in 1969. Mitchell was named to his first All-Star team, and also led the majors in slugging percentage (.635), on-base plus slugging (1.023), total bases (345), and intentional walks (32).

In the 1989 postseason, Mitchell posted a .353 average, two home runs and 7 RBI in the NLCS, helping the Giants to their first World Series appearance since 1962. Mitchell hit safely in every game of the 1989 World Series, batting .294 with a home run, two runs scored, and 2 RBI in the Oakland Athletics' four-game sweep.

The barehanded catch

Mitchell set the tone for his charmed 1989 season early in the year with a unique defensive play on April 26. Sprinting toward the left field foul line in St. Louis's Busch Stadium, for a ball off the bat of Ozzie Smith, Mitchell realized he had overrun the ball, but was able to reach back and snare the ball with his bare hand.

==== Remainder of Giants tenure ====
Mitchell made another All-Star team in 1990, and finished the season batting .290 with 35 home runs and 93 RBI in 140 games. He ranked among the National League leaders in home runs (third), slugging percentage (.544, third), on-base plus slugging (.904, sixth), total bases (285, eighth), and extra-base hits (61, ninth). In 1991, Mitchell hit .256 with 27 home runs and 69 RBI in 113 games.

=== Later career ===
On December 11, 1991, Mitchell and pitcher Mike Remlinger were traded to the Seattle Mariners in exchange for pitchers Bill Swift, Mike Jackson and Dave Burba. Mitchell arrived at spring training 30 pounds (14 kg) overweight, and struggled to begin the season, batting just .222 with two home runs and 20 RBI through the end of May. Starting on June 1, Mitchell rebounded and batted .337 the rest of the way along with seven home runs and 47 RBI in his last 54 games. Overall, he batted .286 with nine home runs and 67 RBI in 99 games with the Mariners.

On November 17, 1992, Mitchell was traded to the Cincinnati Reds for pitcher Norm Charlton. He had a resurgence in two seasons with the Reds, batting .341 with 19 home runs and 64 RBI in just 323 at-bats in 1993 and .323 with 30 home runs and 77 RBI in the strike-shortened 1994 season. However, his weight problems kept him from being more productive. Because of the baseball strike, he opted to play for the Fukuoka Daiei Hawks in Japan the following year, where he became the highest-paid player in Japanese history. In Japan, he incurred the displeasure of team management when he chose to travel to the U.S. in mid-season for treatment of knee problems against the team's wishes. He spent only two months with the team. It was discovered later that he did indeed need surgery on his knee.

On March 8, 1996, Mitchell signed with the Boston Red Sox as a free agent. He hit .304 with two home runs and 13 RBI in 27 games with Boston before being traded back to the Reds in exchange for infielder Roberto Mejía and pitcher Brad Tweedlie on July 30. Mitchell batted .325 with six home runs and 26 RBI in 37 games for the Reds to close the season.

On December 13, 1996, Mitchell signed with the Cleveland Indians. In May, after teammate Chad Curtis objected to lyrics of a rap song Mitchell was playing in the clubhouse, and shut off the clubhouse stereo, Curtis exchanged punches with Mitchell, who threw Curtis over a ping pong table. Curtis sustained a bruised right thumb in the fight, and was placed on the 15-day disabled list. Mitchell was designated for assignment on May 24. At the time, he was batting just .153 with four home runs and 11 RBI in 20 games. Mitchell was released on June 3.

Mitchell signed a minor league contract with the Oakland Athletics on March 9, 1998. After a strong spring training, he made the team's Opening Day roster. On August 4, Mitchell was released by Oakland following their game that night. He batted .228 with two home runs and 21 RBI in 51 games with the Athletics. Mitchell played the following two seasons in independent ball before officially retiring.

In his 13-season career with eight teams, Mitchell batted .284 with 234 home runs, 760 runs batted in, 630 runs scored, 1,173 hits, 224 doubles, 25 triples and 491 bases on balls in 1,223 games.

== Personal life ==
After his retirement, Mitchell returned to live in San Diego. and plays in the San Diego Adult Baseball League for the championship team, the San Diego Black Sox.

Mitchell's cousin, Keith Mitchell, also played in the major leagues for four teams across four seasons (between 1991 and 1998), ending his career with a .260 batting average and eight home runs.

=== Arrests and suspension ===
Mitchell was the subject of a rape investigation in Chula Vista, California, in December 1991. No charges were filed.

After being released from Major League Baseball for the last time, he was arrested in 1999 for assaulting his father during an argument. In the independent leagues as manager of the Sonoma County Crushers in 2000, he was suspended for nine games after punching the opposing team's owner in the mouth during a brawl. In 2010, Mitchell was arrested for alleged misdemeanor battery at the Bonita Golf Club in Bonita, California. He was ordered to perform community service and attend anger management classes.

== See also ==
- List of Major League Baseball annual runs batted in leaders
- List of Major League Baseball annual home run leaders
