= 1990 Chicago Cubs season =

1990 Chicago Cubs
- League: National League
- Division: East
- Ballpark: Wrigley Field
- City: Chicago
- Record: 77–85 (.475)
- Divisional place: 4th
- Owners: Tribune Company
- General managers: Jim Frey
- Managers: Don Zimmer
- Television: WGN-TV/Superstation WGN (Harry Caray, Steve Stone, Thom Brennaman)
- Radio: WGN (Thom Brennaman, Ron Santo, Bob Brenly, Harry Caray)
- Stats: ESPN.com; Baseball Reference

The 1990 Chicago Cubs season was the 119th season of the Chicago Cubs franchise, the 115th in the National League and the 75th at Wrigley Field. The Cubs finished fourth in the National League East with a record of 77–85. The Cubs hosted the All-Star Game on July 10.

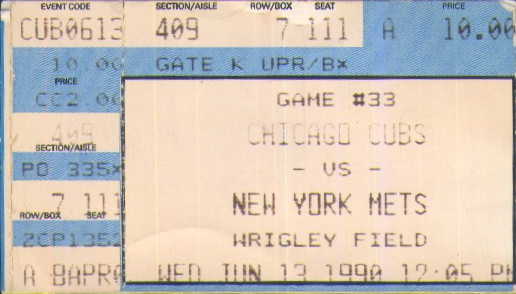
A ticket for a 1990 game between the New York Mets and the Chicago Cubs.

== Offseason ==
- December 7, 1989: Paul Kilgus was traded by the Cubs to the Toronto Blue Jays for José Núñez.
- January 2, 1990: Vance Law was released by the Cubs.

== Regular season ==
- Ryne Sandberg became the first second baseman to lead the National League in home runs since Rogers Hornsby in 1925.
- Sandberg also set the Major League record for consecutive errorless games at second base with 124.

=== Season standings ===
NL East
| Team | W | L | Pct. | GB | Home | Road |
|---|---|---|---|---|---|---|
| Pittsburgh Pirates | 95 | 67 | .586 | — | 49‍–‍32 | 46‍–‍35 |
| New York Mets | 91 | 71 | .562 | 4 | 52‍–‍29 | 39‍–‍42 |
| Montreal Expos | 85 | 77 | .525 | 10 | 47‍–‍34 | 38‍–‍43 |
| Chicago Cubs | 77 | 85 | .475 | 18 | 39‍–‍42 | 38‍–‍43 |
| Philadelphia Phillies | 77 | 85 | .475 | 18 | 41‍–‍40 | 36‍–‍45 |
| St. Louis Cardinals | 70 | 92 | .432 | 25 | 34‍–‍47 | 36‍–‍45 |

=== Record vs. opponents ===
1990 National League record Sources:
| Team | ATL | CHC | CIN | HOU | LAD | MON | NYM | PHI | PIT | SD | SF | STL |
|---|---|---|---|---|---|---|---|---|---|---|---|---|
| Atlanta | — | 6–6 | 8–10 | 5–13 | 6–12 | 6–6 | 4–8 | 5–7 | 5–7 | 8–10 | 5–13 | 7–5 |
| Chicago | 6–6 | — | 4–8 | 6–6 | 3–9 | 11–7 | 9–9 | 11–7 | 4–14 | 8–4 | 7–5 | 8–10 |
| Cincinnati | 10–8 | 8–4 | — | 11–7 | 9–9 | 9–3 | 6–6 | 7–5 | 6–6 | 9–9 | 7–11 | 9–3 |
| Houston | 13–5 | 6–6 | 7–11 | — | 9–9 | 5–7 | 5–7 | 5–7 | 5–7 | 4–14 | 10–8 | 6–6 |
| Los Angeles | 12–6 | 9–3 | 9–9 | 9–9 | — | 6–6 | 5–7 | 8–4 | 4–8 | 9–9 | 8–10 | 7–5 |
| Montreal | 6–6 | 7–11 | 3–9 | 7–5 | 6–6 | — | 8–10 | 10–8 | 13–5 | 7–5 | 7–5 | 11–7 |
| New York | 8–4 | 9–9 | 6–6 | 7–5 | 7–5 | 10–8 | — | 10–8 | 10–8 | 5–7 | 7–5 | 12–6 |
| Philadelphia | 7-5 | 7–11 | 5–7 | 7–5 | 4–8 | 8–10 | 8–10 | — | 6–12 | 7–5 | 8–4 | 10–8 |
| Pittsburgh | 7–5 | 14–4 | 6–6 | 7–5 | 8–4 | 5–13 | 8–10 | 12–6 | — | 10–2 | 8–4 | 10–8 |
| San Diego | 10–8 | 4–8 | 9–9 | 14–4 | 9–9 | 5–7 | 7–5 | 5–7 | 2–10 | — | 7–11 | 3–9 |
| San Francisco | 13–5 | 5–7 | 11–7 | 8–10 | 10–8 | 5–7 | 5–7 | 4–8 | 4–8 | 11–7 | — | 9–3 |
| St. Louis | 5–7 | 10–8 | 3–9 | 6–6 | 5–7 | 7–11 | 6–12 | 8–10 | 8–10 | 9–3 | 3–9 | — |

=== Notable transactions ===
- September 1, 1990: Greg Kallevig (minors) was traded by the Cubs to the Pittsburgh Pirates for Randy Kramer.

== Roster ==
1990 Chicago Cubs
Roster
| Pitchers: 45 Paul Assenmacher; 36 Mike Bielecki; 51 Kevin Blankenship; 47 Shawn Boskie; 42 Kevin Coffman; 33 Lance Dickson; 22 Mike Harkey; 38 Joe Kraemer; 50 Les Lancaster; 37 Bill Long; 31 Greg Maddux; 39 José Núñez; 46 Dave Pavlas; 41 Jeff Pico; 40 Rick Sutcliffe; 38 Dean Wilkins; 28 Mitch Williams; 44 Steve Wilson | Catchers: 9 Damon Berryhill; 7 Joe Girardi; 32 Héctor Villanueva; 1 Rick Wrona; Infielders: 12 Shawon Dunston; 17 Mark Grace; 15 Domingo Ramos; 11 Luis Salazar; 23 Ryne Sandberg; 16 Greg Smith; 19 Curtis Wilkerson | Outfielders: 30 Dave Clark; 29 Doug Dascenzo; 8 Andre Dawson; 27 Derrick May; 10 Lloyd McClendon; 18 Dwight Smith; 24 Gary Varsho; 20 Jerome Walton; 25 Marvell Wynne | Manager: 4 Don Zimmer; Coaches: 6 Joe Altobelli (bench/hitting); 5 Chuck Cottier (third base); 3 José Martínez (first base); 34 Dick Pole (pitching); 48 Phil Roof (bullpen) |

=== Game log ===
April (8–11)
| # | Date | Opponent | Score | Win | Loss | Save | Attendance | Record |
|---|---|---|---|---|---|---|---|---|
| 1 | April 10 | Phillies | 2–1 | Lancaster (1–0) | Parrett (0–1) | Williams (1) | 7,791 | 1–0 |
| 2 | April 12 | Phillies | 5–4 | Mulholland (1–0) | Wilson (0–1) | McDowell (1) | | 1–1 |
| 3 | April 12 | Phillies | 6–3 | Núñez (1–0) | Combs (0–1) | Williams (2) | 7,717 | 2–1 |
| 4 | April 13 | @ Pirates | 2–0 | Maddux (1–0) | Walk (0–1) | Williams (3) | 44,799 | 3–1 |
| 5 | April 14 | @ Pirates | 4–1 | Harkey (1–0) | Drabek (1–1) | Williams (4) | 13,226 | 4–1 |
| 6 | April 15 | @ Pirates | 4 – 3 (10) | Patterson (1–0) | Lancaster (1–1) | | 6,289 | 4–2 |
| 7 | April 16 | Mets | 10–1 | Viola (2–0) | Wilson (0–2) | Pena (1) | 13,813 | 4–3 |
| 8 | April 17 | @ Mets | 8 – 6 (13) | Assenmacher (1–0) | Innis (0–1) | Wilkins (1) | 13,964 | 5–3 |
| 9 | April 18 | @ Mets | 8–5 | Maddux (2–0) | Cone (0–1) | | 21,561 | 6–3 |
| 10 | April 19 | @ Mets | 4–1 | Gooden (1–2) | Harkey (1–1) | Franco (3) | 18,780 | 6–4 |
| 11 | April 20 | Pirates | 9 – 4 (7) | Roesler (1–0) | Bielecki (0–1) | | 15,171 | 6–5 |
| 12 | April 21 | Pirates | 4–3 | Smiley (1–2) | Wilson (0–3) | Landrum (1) | 37,091 | 6–6 |
| 13 | April 22 | Pirates | 3–2 | Heaton (3–0) | Núñez (1–1) | Power (1) | 33,583 | 6–7 |
| 14 | April 24 | @ Padres | 13–3 | Rasmussen (1–0) | Maddux (2–1) | | 19,474 | 6–8 |
| 15 | April 25 | @ Padres | 3–0 | Whitson (2–0) | Bielecki (0–2) | | 22,305 | 6–9 |
| 16 | April 26 | @ Padres | 3–1 | Harkey (2–1) | Hurst (0–3) | Williams (5) | 29,168 | 7–9 |
| 17 | April 27 | @ Dodgers | 5–0 | Valenzuela (1–2) | Núñez (1–2) | | 37,809 | 7–10 |
| 18 | April 28 | @ Dodgers | 5–4 | Martinez (2–0) | Williams (0–1) | | 45,791 | 7–11 |
| 19 | April 29 | @ Dodgers | 4–0 | Maddux (3–1) | Morgan (3–1) | | 41,893 | 8–11 |

May (13–15)
| # | Date | Opponent | Score | Win | Loss | Save | Attendance | Record |
|---|---|---|---|---|---|---|---|---|
| 20 | May 1 | @ Giants | 7–4 | Bielecki (1–2) | Knepper (0–1) | Williams (6) | 21,714 | 9–11 |
| 21 | May 2 | @ Giants | 9–6 | Harkey (3–1) | Garrelts (0–3) | Assenmacher (1) | 18,279 | 10–11 |
| 22 | May 5 | Padres | 3–2 | Maddux (4–1) | Lefferts (1–1) | | | 11–11 |
| 23 | May 5 | Padres | 6–5 | Rasmussen (2–1) | Núñez (1–3) | Harris (1) | 33,695 | 11–12 |
| 24 | May 6 | Padres | 8–3 | Whitson (3–1) | Bielecki (1–3) | | 34,077 | 11–13 |
| 25 | May 7 | Braves | 9–8 | Kerfeld (2–2) | Williams (0–2) | Boever (3) | 32,266 | 11–14 |
| 26 | May 8 | Braves | 10 – 8 (11) | Long (1–0) | Henry (0–1) | | 18,503 | 12–14 |
| 27 | May 9 | Braves | 4 – 0 (5) | Lancaster (2–1) | P. Smith (2–2) | | 14,266 | 13–14 |
| 28 | May 11 | @ Reds | 7–5 | Charlton (2–0) | Williams (0–3) | Dibble (5) | 38,900 | 13–15 |
| 29 | May 12 | @ Reds | 4–2 | Bielecki (2–3) | Browning (3–3) | Williams (7) | 33,646 | 14–15 |
| 30 | May 13 | @ Reds | 13–9 | Dibble (2–0) | Wilson (0–4) | | 32,251 | 14–16 |
| 31 | May 14 | @ Braves | 3–2 | Henry (1–1) | Williams (0–4) | Kerfeld (2) | 16,417 | 14–17 |
| 32 | May 15 | @ Braves | 12–2 | Pico (1–0) | P. Smith (2–3) | | 16,271 | 15–17 |
| 33 | May 16 | @ Braves | 4–0 | Smoltz (2–4) | Maddux (4–2) | | 13,345 | 15–18 |
| 34 | May 17 | @ Astros | 5 – 4 (11) | Smith (2–2) | Núñez (1–4) | | 14,644 | 15–19 |
| 35 | May 18 | @ Astros | 7–0 | Harkey (4–1) | Gullickson (2–3) | | 22,972 | 16–19 |
| 36 | May 19 | @ Astros | 4–1 | Lancaster (3–1) | Clancy (1–3) | Williams (8) | 32,253 | 17–19 |
| 37 | May 20 | @ Astros | 5–1 | Boskie (1–0) | Scott (1–5) | | 26,451 | 18–19 |
| 38 | May 21 | Reds | 4–3 | Rijo (3–1) | Maddux (4–3) | Myers (8) | 31,476 | 18–20 |
| 39 | May 22 | Reds | 2 – 1 (16) | Long (2–0) | Scudder (1–1) | | 29,860 | 19–20 |
| 40 | May 23 | Dodgers | 4–3 | Belcher (4–3) | Assenmacher (1–1) | Aase (3) | 23,963 | 19–21 |
| 41 | May 24 | Dodgers | 15–6 | Valenzuela (4–3) | Lancaster (3–2) | | 27,918 | 19–22 |
| 42 | May 26 | Astros | 8–1 | Scott (2–5) | Boskie (1–1) | | | 19–23 |
| 43 | May 26 | Astros | 12–3 | Deshaies (2–2) | Maddux (4–4) | Andersen (2) | 31,995 | 19–24 |
| 44 | May 27 | Astros | 11–6 | Bielecki (3–3) | Portugal (1–5) | | 36,395 | 20–24 |
| 45 | May 28 | Giants | 5–1 | Harkey (5–1) | Knepper (3–3) | Lancaster (1) | 33,822 | 21–24 |
| 46 | May 29 | Giants | 6–2 | Robinson (1–0) | Blankenship (0–1) | Brantley (5) | 28,925 | 21–25 |
| 47 | May 30 | Giants | 4–1 | Burkett (4–1) | Boskie (1–2) | Bedrosian (7) | 29,109 | 21–26 |

June (12–18)
| # | Date | Opponent | Score | Win | Loss | Save | Attendance | Record |
|---|---|---|---|---|---|---|---|---|
| 48 | June 1 | @ Cardinals | 6–4 | DeLeón (5–3) | Maddux (4–5) | L. Smith (5) | 43,773 | 21–27 |
| 49 | June 2 | @ Cardinals | 7–6 | Lancaster (4–2) | L. Smith (1–1) | Williams (9) | 48,051 | 22–27 |
| 50 | June 3 | @ Cardinals | 7–4 | B. Smith (6–4) | Blankenship (0–2) | | 45,393 | 22–28 |
| 51 | June 4 | @ Pirates | 6–2 | Patterson (4–1) | Boskie (1–3) | Landrum (8) | 9,257 | 22–29 |
| 52 | June 5 | @ Pirates | 6–5 | Belinda (1–1) | Williams (0–5) | | 20,642 | 22–30 |
| 53 | June 6 | @ Pirates | 6 – 1 (7) | Drabek (8–2) | Maddux (4–6) | | 21,164 | 22–31 |
| 54 | June 7 | Phillies | 3–1 | Howell (7–3) | Bielecki (3–4) | | 29,271 | 22–32 |
| 55 | June 8 | Phillies | 15–2 | Pico (2–0) | Mulholland (3–3) | | 32,219 | 23–32 |
| 56 | June 9 | Phillies | 4 – 3 (11) | Lancaster (5–2) | Parrett (2–4) | | 33,266 | 24–32 |
| 57 | June 10 | Phillies | 7–3 | Wilson (1–4) | Ruffin (3–6) | Lancaster (2) | 32,187 | 25–32 |
| 58 | June 11 | Mets | 8–5 | Williams (1–5) | Pena (1–2) | Assenmacher (2) | 33,059 | 26–32 |
| 59 | June 12 | Mets | 19–8 | Gooden (4–5) | Bielecki (3–5) | | 34,893 | 26–33 |
| 60 | June 13 | Mets | 15–10 | Franco (3–0) | Lancaster (5–3) | | | 26–34 |
| 61 | June 13 | Mets | 9–6 | Darling (2–4) | Harkey (5–2) | | 34,241 | 26–35 |
| 62 | June 15 | @ Phillies | 6 – 5 (10) | Akerfelds (1–0) | Núñez (1–5) | | | 26–36 |
| 63 | June 15 | @ Phillies | 7–0 | Ruffin (4–6) | Bielecki (3–6) | | 26,098 | 26–37 |
| 64 | June 16 | @ Phillies | 2–1 | Akerfelds (2–0) | Maddux (4–7) | | 32,023 | 26–38 |
| 65 | June 17 | @ Phillies | 5–3 | Pico (3–0) | Parrett (2–6) | Lancaster (3) | 30,338 | 27–38 |
| 66 | June 18 | @ Expos | 5–1 | Den. Martinez (5–4) | Harkey (5–3) | | 15,898 | 27–39 |
| 67 | June 19 | @ Expos | 2–1 | Boskie (2–3) | Gardner (3–3) | Lancaster (4) | 20,306 | 28–39 |
| 68 | June 20 | @ Expos | 3–2 | Mohorcic (1–1) | Maddux (4–8) | Schmidt (8) | 22,058 | 28–40 |
| 69 | June 22 | Cardinals | 7–0 | Magrane (4–9) | Wilson (1–5) | | 30,764 | 28–41 |
| 70 | June 23 | Cardinals | 8–7 | Tewksbury (2–0) | Bielecki (3–7) | L. Smith (7) | 33,721 | 28–42 |
| 71 | June 24 | Cardinals | 3 – 2 (10) | Assenmacher (2–1) | Niedenfuer (0–3) | | 34,229 | 29–42 |
| 72 | June 25 | Expos | 7–3 | Gardner (4–3) | Boskie (2–4) | Sampen (1) | 32,231 | 29–43 |
| 73 | June 26 | Expos | 6–5 | Schmidt (3–0) | Lancaster (5–4) | Frey (4) | 31,676 | 29–44 |
| 74 | June 27 | Expos | 5–3 | Pico (4–0) | Gross (8–5) | Wilson (1) | 32,830 | 30–44 |
| 75 | June 28 | Expos | 3–2 | Lancaster (6–4) | Sampen (6–1) | | 31,974 | |
| 76 | June 29 | @ Padres | 3–2 | Long (3–0) | Harris (4–2) | Assenmacher (3) | 43,005 | 32–44 |
| 77 | June 30 | @ Padres | 7–3 | Wilson (2–5) | Benes (6–6) | | 31,852 | 33–44 |

July (14–12)
| # | Date | Opponent | Score | Win | Loss | Save | Attendance | Record |
|---|---|---|---|---|---|---|---|---|
| 78 | July 1 | @ Padres | 11–10 | Lancaster (7–4) | Lefferts (5–3) | Long (1) | 30,968 | 34–44 |
| 79 | July 2 | @ Dodgers | 3–1 | Belcher (6–6) | Pico (4–1) | | 32,600 | 34–45 |
| 80 | July 3 | @ Dodgers | 7–6 | Hartley (1–1) | Assenmacher (2–2) | | 40,235 | 34–46 |
| 81 | July 4 | @ Dodgers | 5–3 | Harkey (6–3) | Valenzuela (6–7) | Lancaster (5) | 46,811 | 35–46 |
| 82 | July 6 | @ Giants | 5–2 | Boskie (3–4) | Garrelts (5–7) | Long (2) | 28,517 | 36–46 |
| 83 | July 7 | @ Giants | 10–9 | Brantley (3–1) | Lancaster (7–5) | | 36,005 | 36–47 |
| 84 | July 8 | @ Giants | 5–3 | Wilson (6–0) | Pico (4–2) | Brantley (13) | | 36–48 |
| 85 | July 8 | @ Giants | 10–4 | Burkett (9–2) | Bielecki (3–8) | | 45,669 | 36–49 |
| 86 | July 12 | Dodgers | 6–3 | Valenzuela (7–7) | Harkey (6–4) | Howell (5) | 31,518 | 36–50 |
| 87 | July 13 | Dodgers | 5–2 | Martinez (10–4) | Boskie (3–5) | Howell (6) | 31,438 | 36–51 |
| 88 | July 14 | Dodgers | 7–0 | Morgan (8–7) | Maddux (4–9) | | 31,919 | 36–52 |
| 89 | July 15 | Dodgers | 5–1 | Wilson (3–5) | Belcher (7–7) | | 29,266 | 37–52 |
| 90 | July 16 | Padres | 4–3 | Harkey (7–4) | Show (1–7) | Williams (10) | 31,523 | 38–52 |
| 91 | July 17 | Padres | 7–2 | Boskie (4–5) | Benes (6–7) | | 32,923 | 39–52 |
| 92 | July 18 | Padres | 4–2 | Maddux (5–9) | Rasmussen (7–7) | Pico (1) | 33,856 | 40–52 |
| 93 | July 20 | Giants | 5–4 | Bielecki (4–8) | Brantley (3–2) | | 30,532 | 41–52 |
| 94 | July 21 | Giants | 3–2 | Harkey (8–4) | Brantley (3–3) | | 34,463 | 42–52 |
| 95 | July 22 | Giants | 4–2 | Assenmacher (3–2) | Hammaker (4–5) | Pico (2) | 33,708 | 43–52 |
| 96 | July 23 | @ Cardinals | 3–1 | Maddux (6–9) | DeLeón (6–10) | Williams (11) | 40,534 | 44–52 |
| 97 | July 24 | @ Cardinals | 9–4 | Terry (1–5) | Wilson (3–6) | | 38,974 | 44–53 |
| 98 | July 25 | @ Cardinals | 9–0 | Tudor (9–3) | Harkey (8–5) | | 37,826 | 44–54 |
| 99 | July 26 | @ Expos | 3 – 2 (10) | Burke (1–1) | Williams (1–6) | | 19,129 | 44–55 |
| 100 | July 27 | @ Expos | 2 – 0 (10) | Maddux (7–9) | Sampen (8–3) | Long (3) | 21,980 | 45–55 |
| 101 | July 28 | @ Expos | 10–7 | Long (4–0) | Burke (1–2) | | 24,808 | 46–55 |
| 102 | July 29 | @ Expos | 2–1 | Harkey (9–5) | Gross (8–8) | Williams (12) | 24,333 | 47–55 |
| 103 | July 31 | Pirates | 9–1 | Patterson (7–3) | Boskie (4–6) | | 35,126 | 47–56 |

August (15–12)
| # | Date | Opponent | Score | Win | Loss | Save | Attendance | Record |
|---|---|---|---|---|---|---|---|---|
| 104 | August 1 | Pirates | 5–0 | Maddux (8–9) | Reed (2–3) | | 34,542 | 48–56 |
| 105 | August 2 | Pirates | 8–5 | Smiley (5–5) | Wilson (3–7) | Walk (1) | 34,493 | 48–57 |
| 106 | August 3 | Expos | 10–4 | Harkey (10–5) | Gardner (6–6) | | 33,318 | 49–57 |
| 107 | August 4 | Expos | 10–2 | Boskie (5–6) | Gross (8–9) | | 35,176 | 50–57 |
| 108 | August 5 | Expos | 3–1 | Maddux (9–9) | Boyd (6–4) | | 33,481 | 51–57 |
| 109 | August 7 | Cardinals | 5–3 | Assenmacher (4–2) | Terry (1–6) | Williams (13) | 34,271 | 52–57 |
| 110 | August 8 | Cardinals | 4 – 3 (15) | Long (5–0) | Niedenfuer (0–5) | | 34,977 | 53–57 |
| 111 | August 9 | Cardinals | 3–1 | Hill (3–1) | Dickson (0–1) | L. Smith (20) | 36,328 | 53–58 |
| 112 | August 10 | @ Mets | 5–1 | Fernandez (8–8) | Maddux (9–10) | | 34,090 | 53–59 |
| 113 | August 11 | @ Mets | 6–3 | Wilson (4–7) | Darling (4–7) | Assenmacher (4) | 45,710 | 54–59 |
| 114 | August 12 | @ Mets | 10–2 | Harkey (11–5) | Viola (15–7) | | 46,538 | 55–59 |
| 115 | August 13 | Astros | 7–2 | Portugal (6–9) | Dickson (0–2) | | 34,087 | 55–60 |
| 116 | August 14 | Astros | 5–2 | Maddux (10–10) | Scott (9–11) | Long (4) | 34,843 | 56–60 |
| 117 | August 15 | Astros | 8 – 4 (10) | Smith (3–4) | Pico (4–3) | | 34,307 | 56–61 |
| 118 | August 17 | Braves | 7–0 | Harkey (12–5) | Smoltz (9–9) | | 29,893 | 57–61 |
| 119 | August 18 | Braves | 17–6 | Leibrandt (5–7) | Dickson (0–3) | | 36,226 | 57–62 |
| 120 | August 19 | Braves | 5–4 | Maddux (11–10) | Mercker (4–3) | Assenmacher (5) | 33,284 | 58–62 |
| 121 | August 20 | @ Reds | 3–1 | Bielecki (5–8) | Charlton (9–7) | Long (5) | 26,011 | 59–62 |
| 122 | August 21 | @ Reds | 8–1 | Mahler (5–5) | Harkey (12–6) | | 22,759 | 59–63 |
| 123 | August 22 | @ Reds | 4–1 | Rijo (9–6) | Pico (4–4) | | 28,707 | 59–64 |
| 124 | August 24 | @ Braves | 3–0 | Avery (3–7) | Maddux (11–11) | | 20,922 | 59–65 |
| 125 | August 25 | @ Braves | 6–3 | Bielecki (6–8) | Glavine (6–11) | Assenmacher (6) | 29,359 | 60–65 |
| 126 | August 26 | @ Braves | 4–3 | Smoltz (11–9) | Williams (1–7) | | 14,178 | 60–66 |
| 127 | August 28 | @ Astros | 5–2 | Maddux (12–11) | Gullickson (8–12) | | 12,150 | 61–66 |
| 128 | August 29 | @ Astros | 1–0 | Portugal (8–9) | Sutcliffe (0–1) | Andersen (6) | 11,211 | 61–67 |
| 129 | August 30 | Reds | 6–5 | Jackson (5–2) | Bielecki (6–9) | Myers (27) | 30,778 | 61–68 |
| 130 | August 31 | Reds | 4–3 | Long (6–0) | Myers (3–4) | | 31,042 | 62–68 |

September (13–16)
| # | Date | Opponent | Score | Win | Loss | Save | Attendance | Record |
|---|---|---|---|---|---|---|---|---|
| 131 | September 1 | Reds | 8–1 | Mahler (7–5) | Núñez (1–6) | | 34,388 | 62–69 |
| 132 | September 2 | Reds | 6–2 | Rijo (11–6) | Maddux (12–12) | | 35,043 | 62–70 |
| 133 | September 3 | @ Expos | 3 – 2 (12) | Frey (7–2) | Kramer (0–2) | | 22,629 | 62–71 |
| 134 | September 4 | @ Expos | 3–1 | Bielecki (7–9) | Dn. Martinez (10–10) | Assenmacher (7) | 10,605 | 63–71 |
| 135 | September 5 | @ Phillies | 4–1 | Mulholland (8–8) | Wilson (4–8) | McDowell (19) | 16,177 | 63–72 |
| 136 | September 6 | @ Phillies | 5–2 | Núñez (2–6) | Grimsley (1–1) | Williams (14) | 13,849 | 64–72 |
| 137 | September 7 | Cardinals | 4–3 | Tewksbury (10–5) | Maddux (12–13) | L. Smith (25) | 23,353 | 64–73 |
| 138 | September 8 | Cardinals | 5–4 | Pavlas (1–0) | Dayley (4–3) | Assenmacher (8) | 32,039 | 65–73 |
| 139 | September 9 | Cardinals | 9–2 | Tudor (12–4) | Bielecki (7–10) | | 27,362 | 65–74 |
| 140 | September 10 | Expos | 7–4 | Nabholz (5–0) | Long (6–1) | Burke (18) | 26,774 | 65–75 |
| 141 | September 11 | Expos | 11–6 | Pavlas (2–0) | Gross (8–11) | | 18,984 | 66–75 |
| 142 | September 12 | Phillies | 9–3 | Maddux (13–13) | De Jesus (5–7) | | 16,258 | 67–75 |
| 143 | September 13 | Phillies | 6–5 | Assenmacher (5–2) | McDowell (6–7) | Lancaster (6) | 15,495 | 68–75 |
| 144 | September 14 | @ Cardinals | 4–2 | B. Smith (8–8) | Williams (1–8) | Pérez (1) | 34,473 | 68–76 |
| 145 | September 15 | @ Cardinals | 6–2 | Lancaster (8–5) | DeLeón (7–17) | | 42,282 | 69–76 |
| 146 | September 16 | @ Cardinals | 8–4 | Núñez (3–6) | Hill (4–4) | Bielecki (1) | 39,402 | 70–76 |
| 147 | September 18 | Pirates | 8–5 | Maddux (14–13) | Smiley (8–10) | | 23,168 | 71–76 |
| 148 | September 19 | Pirates | 8–7 | Drabek (20–6) | Sutcliffe (0–2) | Patterson (5) | 13,058 | 71–77 |
| 149 | September 20 | Pirates | 11–2 | Walk (6–5) | Kramer (0–3) | Palacios (1) | 14,926 | 71–78 |
| 150 | September 21 | Mets | 4–3 | Assenmacher (6–2) | Cone (12–10) | | 19,291 | 72–78 |
| 151 | September 22 | Mets | 11–5 | Darling (6–9) | Núñez (3–7) | | 31,066 | 72–79 |
| 152 | September 23 | Mets | 7–3 | Gooden (18–6) | Maddux (14–14) | | 24,385 | 72–80 |
| 153 | September 24 | Mets | 4–3 | Assenmacher (7–2) | Viola (19–11) | | 12,489 | 73–80 |
| 154 | September 25 | @ Pirates | 5–3 | Drabek (21–6) | Wilson (4–9) | | 21,644 | 73–81 |
| 155 | September 26 | @ Pirates | 4–3 | Smith (12–8) | Coffman (0–1) | | 26,157 | 73–82 |
| 156 | September 27 | @ Pirates | 3–2 | Tomlin (4–4) | Bielecki (7–11) | Palacios (3) | 25,049 | 73–83 |
| 157 | September 28 | @ Mets | 7–1 | Gooden (19–6) | Maddux (14–15) | | 37,586 | 73–84 |
| 158 | September 29 | @ Mets | 3–2 | Lancaster (9–5) | Viola (19–12) | Assenmacher (9) | 38,664 | 74–84 |
| 159 | September 30 | @ Mets | 6–5 | Núñez (4–7) | Franco (5–3) | Williams (15) | 39,195 | 75–84 |

October (2–1)
| # | Date | Opponent | Score | Win | Loss | Save | Attendance | Record |
|---|---|---|---|---|---|---|---|---|
| 160 | October 1 | @ Phillies | 7–6 | De Jesus (7–8) | Coffman (0–2) | McDowell (22) | 9,041 | 75–85 |
| 161 | October 2 | @ Phillies | 3–1 | Bielecki (8–11) | Greene (3–3) | Williams (16) | 9,940 | 76–85 |
| 162 | October 3 | @ Phillies | 4–3 | Maddux (15–15) | McElroy (0–1) | Assenmacher (10) | 11,889 | 77–85 |

=== All-Star Game ===
The 1990 Major League Baseball All-Star Game was the 61st playing of the midsummer classic between the all-stars of the American League (AL) and National League (NL), the two leagues comprising Major League Baseball. The game was held on July 10, 1990, at Wrigley Field in Chicago, the home of the Chicago Cubs of the National League. The game resulted in the American League defeating the National League 2–0. The game is remembered for a rain delay in the 7th inning that resulted in CBS airing Rescue 911 during the delay.

== Player stats ==
| = Indicates team leader |

| = Indicates league leader |

=== Batting ===
==== Starters by position ====
Note: Pos = Position; G = Games played; AB = At bats; H = Hits; Avg. = Batting average; HR = Home runs; RBI = Runs batted in

| Pos | Player | G | AB | H | Avg. | HR | RBI |
|---|---|---|---|---|---|---|---|
| C | Joe Girardi | 133 | 419 | 113 | .270 | 1 | 38 |
| 1B | Mark Grace | 157 | 589 | 182 | .309 | 9 | 82 |
| 2B | Ryne Sandberg | 155 | 615 | 188 | .306 | 40 | 100 |
| SS | Shawon Dunston | 146 | 545 | 143 | .262 | 17 | 66 |
| 3B | Luis Salazar | 115 | 410 | 104 | .254 | 12 | 47 |
| LF | Dwight Smith | 117 | 290 | 76 | .262 | 6 | 27 |
| CF | Jerome Walton | 101 | 392 | 103 | .263 | 2 | 21 |
| RF | Andre Dawson | 147 | 529 | 164 | .310 | 27 | 100 |

==== Other batters ====
Note: G = Games played; AB = At bats; H = Hits; Avg. = Batting average; HR = Home runs; RBI = Runs batted in

| Player | G | AB | H | Avg. | HR | RBI |
|---|---|---|---|---|---|---|
| Doug Dascenzo | 113 | 241 | 61 | .253 | 1 | 26 |
| Domingo Ramos | 98 | 226 | 60 | .265 | 2 | 17 |
| Marvell Wynne | 92 | 186 | 38 | .204 | 4 | 19 |
| Curt Wilkerson | 77 | 186 | 41 | .220 | 0 | 16 |
| Dave Clark | 84 | 171 | 47 | .275 | 5 | 20 |
| Héctor Villanueva | 52 | 114 | 31 | .272 | 7 | 18 |
| Lloyd McClendon | 49 | 107 | 17 | .159 | 1 | 10 |
| Derrick May | 17 | 61 | 15 | .246 | 1 | 11 |
| Damon Berryhill | 17 | 53 | 10 | .189 | 1 | 9 |
| Gary Varsho | 46 | 48 | 12 | .250 | 0 | 1 |
| Greg Smith | 18 | 44 | 9 | .205 | 0 | 5 |
| Rick Wrona | 16 | 29 | 5 | .172 | 0 | 0 |

=== Pitching ===
==== Starting pitchers ====
Note" G = Games pitched; IP = Innings pitched; W = Wins; L = Losses; ERA = Earned run average; SO = Strikeouts

| Player | G | IP | W | L | ERA | SO |
|---|---|---|---|---|---|---|
| Greg Maddux | 35 | 237.0 | 15 | 15 | 3.46 | 144 |
| Mike Harkey | 27 | 173.2 | 12 | 6 | 3.26 | 94 |
| Shawn Boskie | 15 | 97.2 | 5 | 6 | 3.69 | 49 |

==== Other pitchers ====
Note: G = Games pitched; IP = Innings pitched; W = Wins; L = Losses; ERA = Earned run average; SO = Strikeouts

| Player | G | IP | W | L | ERA | SO |
|---|---|---|---|---|---|---|
| Mike Bielecki | 36 | 168.0 | 8 | 11 | 4.93 | 103 |
| Steve Wilson | 45 | 139.0 | 4 | 9 | 4.79 | 95 |
| Jeff Pico | 31 | 92.0 | 4 | 4 | 4.79 | 37 |
| José Núñez | 21 | 60.2 | 4 | 7 | 6.53 | 40 |
| Rick Sutcliffe | 5 | 21.1 | 0 | 2 | 5.91 | 7 |
| Randy Kramer | 10 | 20.1 | 0 | 2 | 3.98 | 12 |
| Kevin Coffman | 8 | 18.1 | 0 | 2 | 11.29 | 9 |
| Lance Dickson | 3 | 13.2 | 0 | 3 | 7.24 | 4 |
| Kevin Blankenship | 3 | 12.1 | 0 | 2 | 5.84 | 5 |

==== Relief pitchers ====
Note: G = Games pitched; W = Wins; L = Losses; SV = Saves; ERA = Earned run average; SO = Strikeouts

| Player | G | W | L | SV | ERA | SO |
|---|---|---|---|---|---|---|
| Mitch Williams | 59 | 1 | 8 | 16 | 3.93 | 55 |
| Paul Assenmacher | 74 | 7 | 2 | 10 | 2.80 | 95 |
| Les Lancaster | 55 | 9 | 5 | 6 | 4.62 | 65 |
| Bill Long | 42 | 6 | 1 | 5 | 4.37 | 32 |
| Joe Kraemer | 18 | 0 | 0 | 0 | 7.20 | 16 |
| Dave Pavlas | 13 | 2 | 0 | 0 | 2.11 | 12 |
| Dean Wilkins | 7 | 0 | 0 | 1 | 9.82 | 3 |
| Doug Dascenzo | 1 | 0 | 0 | 0 | 0.00 | 0 |

== Awards and honors ==
- Ryne Sandberg, National League Leader, Home Runs (40)
- Ryne Sandberg, National League Leader, Runs (116)
- Ryne Sandberg, National League Leader, Total Bases (344)

All-Star Game

- Ryne Sandberg, second baseman, starter
- Andre Dawson, outfield, starter
- Shawon Dunston, shortstop, reserve
- Don Zimmer, manager, bench coach

== Farm system ==
| Level | Team | League | Manager |
|---|---|---|---|
| AAA | Iowa Cubs | American Association | Jim Essian |
| AA | Charlotte Knights | Southern League | Tommy Helms and Jay Loviglio |
| A | Winston-Salem Spirits | Carolina League | Brad Mills |
| A | Peoria Chiefs | Midwest League | Greg Mahlberg |
| A-Short Season | Geneva Cubs | New York–Penn League | Bill Hayes |
| Rookie | Huntington Cubs | Appalachian League | Steve Roadcap |
