= 1991 Chicago Cubs season =

1991 Chicago Cubs
- League: National League
- Division: East
- Ballpark: Wrigley Field
- City: Chicago
- Record: 77–83 (.481)
- Divisional place: 4th
- Owners: Tribune Company
- General managers: Jim Frey
- Managers: Don Zimmer, Joe Altobelli, Jim Essian
- Television: WGN-TV/Superstation WGN (Harry Caray, Steve Stone, Thom Brennaman)
- Radio: WGN (Thom Brennaman, Ron Santo, Bob Brenly, Harry Caray)
- Stats: ESPN.com; Baseball Reference

The 1991 Chicago Cubs season was the 120th season of the Chicago Cubs franchise, the 116th in the National League and the 76th at Wrigley Field. The Cubs finished fourth in the National League East with a record of 77–83.

== Offseason ==
- November 21, 1990: Danny Jackson was signed as a free agent by the Cubs.
- December 6, 1990: George Bell was signed as a free agent by the Cubs.
- December 7, 1990: Dave Smith was signed as a free agent by the Cubs.
- December 17, 1990: Randy Kramer was released by the Cubs.
- March 29, 1991: Gary Varsho was traded by the Cubs to the Pittsburgh Pirates for Steve Carter.

== Regular season ==
=== Season standings ===
NL East
Team	W	L	Pct.	GB	Home	Road
Pittsburgh Pirates	98	64	.605	—	52‍–‍32	46‍–‍32
St. Louis Cardinals	84	78	.519	14	52‍–‍32	32‍–‍46
Philadelphia Phillies	78	84	.481	20	47‍–‍36	31‍–‍48
Chicago Cubs	77	83	.481	20	46‍–‍37	31‍–‍46
New York Mets	77	84	.478	20½	40‍–‍42	37‍–‍42
Montreal Expos	71	90	.441	26½	33‍–‍35	38‍–‍55

=== Record vs. opponents ===
1991 National League record Sources:
Team	ATL	CHC	CIN	HOU	LAD	MON	NYM	PHI	PIT	SD	SF	STL
Atlanta	—	6–6	11–7	13–5	7–11	5–7	9–3	5–7	9–3	11–7	9–9	9–3
Chicago	6–6	—	4–8	9–3	2–10	10–7	11–6	8–10	7–11	4–8	6–6	10–8
Cincinnati	7–11	8–4	—	9–9	6–12	6–6	5–7	9–3	2–10	8–10	10–8	4–8
Houston	5–13	3–9	9–9	—	8–10	2–10	7–5	7–5	4–8	6–12	9–9	5–7
Los Angeles	11–7	10–2	12–6	10–8	—	5–7	7–5	7–5	7–5	10–8	8–10	6–6
Montreal	7–5	7–10	6–6	10–2	7–5	—	4–14	4–14	6–12	6–6	7–5	7–11
New York	3–9	6–11	7–5	5–7	5–7	14–4	—	11–7	6–12	7–5	6–6	7–11
Philadelphia	7-5	10–8	3–9	5–7	5–7	14–4	7–11	—	6–12	9–3	6–6	6–12
Pittsburgh	3–9	11–7	10–2	8–4	5–7	12–6	12–6	12–6	—	7–5	7–5	11–7
San Diego	7–11	8–4	10–8	12–6	8–10	6–6	5–7	3–9	5–7	—	11–7	9–3
San Francisco	9–9	6–6	8–10	9–9	10–8	5–7	6–6	6–6	5–7	7–11	—	4–8
St. Louis	3–9	8–10	8–4	7–5	6–6	11–7	11–7	12–6	7–11	3–9	8–4	—

=== Notable transactions ===
- April 7, 1991: Mitch Williams was traded by the Cubs to the Philadelphia Phillies for Chuck McElroy and Bob Scanlan.
- September 29, 1991: Damon Berryhill and Mike Bielecki were traded by the Cubs to the Atlanta Braves for Turk Wendell and Yorkis Pérez.

=== Notable games ===
- July 23: In a 6–4 victory over the Reds, Andre Dawson was ejected in the bottom of the seventh inning for arguing a called third strike by umpire Joe West. After Jim Essian was also ejected for arguing, Dawson proceeded to throw seventeen bats from the bat racks onto the field from the dugout. Dawson was fined $1,000 and suspended for one game.

=== Roster ===
1991 Chicago Cubs
Roster
Pitchers: 45 Paul Assenmacher; 36 Mike Bielecki; 47 Shawn Boskie; 49 Frank Castillo; 22 Mike Harkey; 32 Danny Jackson; 50 Les Lancaster; 31 Greg Maddux; 39 Scott May; 35 Chuck McElroy; 46 Dave Pavlas; 33 Yorkis Pérez; 39 Laddie Renfroe; 30 Bob Scanlan; 51 Heathcliff Slocumb; 42 Dave Smith; 40 Rick Sutcliffe; 44 Steve Wilson	Catchers: 9 Damon Berryhill; 7 Joe Girardi; 37 Erik Pappas; 19 Héctor Villanueva; 2 Rick Wilkins; Infielders: 12 Shawon Dunston; 17 Mark Grace; 10 Luis Salazar; 15 Rey Sánchez; 23 Ryne Sandberg; 25 Gary Scott; 1 Doug Strange; 16 José Vizcaíno; 47 Chico Walker	Outfielders: 11 George Bell; 29 Doug Dascenzo; 8 Andre Dawson; 28 Ced Landrum; 27 Derrick May; 18 Dwight Smith; 20 Jerome Walton	Manager: 6 Joe Altobelli; 41 Jim Essian; 4 Don Zimmer; Coaches: 6 Joe Altobelli (bench/hitting); 5 Chuck Cottier (third base); 3 José Martínez (first base); 34 Dick Pole (pitching); 48 Phil Roof (bullpen)

==== Opening Day lineup ====
- CF 20 Jerome Walton
- 2B 23 Ryne Sandberg
- 1B 17 Mark Grace
- LF 11 George Bell
- RF 8 Andre Dawson
- C 9 Damon Berryhill
- SS 12 Shawon Dunston
- 3B 25 Gary Scott
- P 32 Danny Jackson

=== Schedule ===
#	Date	Opponent	Score	Win	Loss	Save	Attendance	Record	Box/ Streak
1	April 9	Cardinals	1–4	Smith	Jackson	Smith	31,622	0–1	{{{box/streak}}}
2	April 10	Cardinals	2–0	Maddux	DeLeon	Smith	11,204	1–1	{{{box/streak}}}
3	April 11	Cardinals	4–5	Hill	Harkey	Smith	10,830	1–2	{{{box/streak}}}
4	April 12	Pirates	1–3	Smiley	Boskie	Palacios	8,704	1–3	{{{box/streak}}}
5	April 13	Pirates	7–3	Bielecki	Drabek		23,838	2–3	{{{box/streak}}}
6	April 14	Pirates	6–4	Slocumb	Belinda	Smith	25,994	3–3	{{{box/streak}}}
7	April 15	Phillies	5–4	Maddux	Grimsley	Smith	27,794	4–3	{{{box/streak}}}
8	April 16	Phillies	4–3 ^{(13)}	Bielecki	Williams		11,571	5–3	{{{box/streak}}}
9	April 17	Phillies	4–1	Boskie	Combs	Smith	13,680	6–3	{{{box/streak}}}
10	April 18	@ Pirates	3–2	Sutcliffe	Drabek	Assenmacher	9,148	7–3	{{{box/streak}}}
11	April 19	@ Pirates	4–5	Belinda	Smith		13,157	7–4	{{{box/streak}}}
12	April 20	@ Pirates	3–9	Smith	Maddux		13,179	7–5	{{{box/streak}}}
13	April 21	@ Pirates	12–13 ^{(11)}	Patterson	Bielecki		10,860	7–6	{{{box/streak}}}
14	April 22	@ Cardinals	2–3	Agosto	Smith		23,943	7–7	{{{box/streak}}}
15	April 23	@ Cardinals	2–4	Tewksbury	Sutcliffe	Smith	25,384	7–8	{{{box/streak}}}
16	April 24	@ Cardinals	1–0	Bielecki	DeLeon	Assenmacher	25,339	8–8	{{{box/streak}}}
17	April 25	@ Reds	4–6	Power	Slocumb	Myers	22,914	8–9	{{{box/streak}}}
18	April 26	@ Reds	1–3	Rijo	Harkey	Dibble	37,681	8–10	{{{box/streak}}}
19	April 27	@ Reds	8–3	Boskie	Charlton	Assenmacher	35,265	9–10	{{{box/streak}}}
20	April 28	@ Reds	3–4	Hammond	Sutcliffe	Dibble	33,518	9–11	{{{box/streak}}}
21	April 30	Astros	10–3	Bielecki	Portugal		27,523	10–11	{{{box/streak}}}
22	May 1	Astros	11–8	Maddux	Deshaies		17,606	11–11	{{{box/streak}}}
23	May 3	@ Braves	2–5	Glavine	Boskie	Mercker	30,476	11–12	{{{box/streak}}}
24	May 4	@ Braves	2–4	Smoltz	Sutcliffe	Berenguer	20,724	11–13	{{{box/streak}}}
25	May 5	@ Braves	9–6	McElroy	Leibrandt	Smith	27,141	12–13	{{{box/streak}}}
26	May 6	@ Astros	4–3	Maddux	Deshaies	Smith	9,736	13–13	{{{box/streak}}}
27	May 7	@ Astros	4–3	Scanlan	Hernandez	Smith	13,640	14–13	{{{box/streak}}}
28	May 8	@ Astros	2–4	Harnisch	Boskie	Schilling	11,307	14–14	{{{box/streak}}}
29	May 10	Reds	6–5	Sutcliffe	Browning	Smith	35,484	15–14	{{{box/streak}}}
30	May 11	Reds	2–12	Rijo	Bielecki		35,998	15–15	{{{box/streak}}}
31	May 12	Reds	3–5	Armstrong	Maddux	Dibble	32,353	15–16	{{{box/streak}}}
32	May 13	Braves	3–5	Glavine	Boskie		29,579	15–17	{{{box/streak}}}
33	May 14	Braves	5–4	Assenmacher	Mercker	Smith	31,446	16–17	{{{box/streak}}}
34	May 15	Braves	6–1	Assenmacher	Berenguer		25,814	17–17	{{{box/streak}}}
35	May 17	@ Phillies	0–1 ^{(16)}	Greene	Lancaster		28,044	17–18	{{{box/streak}}}
36	May 18	@ Phillies	2–5	Boever	Assenmacher	Williams	34,877	17–19	{{{box/streak}}}
37	May 19	@ Phillies	2–1 ^{(10)}	Bielecki	McDowell	Smith	27,830	18–19	{{{box/streak}}}
38	May 21	@ Mets	6–8	Gooden	Sutcliffe	Franco	29,129	18–20	{{{box/streak}}}
39	May 22	@ Mets	5–2	Maddux	Viola		28,749	19–20	{{{box/streak}}}
40	May 23	@ Mets	4–3	Lancaster	Franco	Assenmacher	29,763	20–20	{{{box/streak}}}
41	May 24	Expos	4–3	Scanlan	Gardner	Slocumb	32,410	21–20	{{{box/streak}}}
42	May 25	Expos	6–1	Bielecki	Mahler	McElroy	16,961	22–20	{{{box/streak}}}
43	May 26	Expos	8–6	Lancaster	Burke	Smith	35,417	23–20	{{{box/streak}}}
44	May 27	Mets	1–3	Viola	Maddux	Franco	33,897	23–21	{{{box/streak}}}
45	May 28	Mets	8–9	Pena	Assenmacher	Franco	32,811	23–22	{{{box/streak}}}
46	May 29	Mets	1–8	Cone	Scanlan		31,359	23–23	{{{box/streak}}}
47	May 31	@ Expos	7–2	Bielecki	Martinez	Lancaster	17,308	24–23	{{{box/streak}}}
48	June 1	@ Expos	2–1 ^{(10)}	McElroy	Jones	Smith	22,184	25–23	{{{box/streak}}}
49	June 2	@ Expos	4–3	Assenmacher	Ruskin	Smith	23,070	26–23	{{{box/streak}}}
50	June 4	Padres	1–7	Benes	Scanlan		32,712	26–24	{{{box/streak}}}
51	June 5	Padres	0–3	Rasmussen	Bielecki		22,500	26–25	{{{box/streak}}}
52	June 6	Padres	6–2	Maddux	Melendez		23,200	27–25	{{{box/streak}}}
53	June 7	Dodgers	2–3	Morgan	Boskie	Howell	35,414	27–26	{{{box/streak}}}
54	June 8	Dodgers	4–3	McElroy	Gross	Smith	35,101	28–26	{{{box/streak}}}
55	June 9	Dodgers	3–6	Hershiser	Jackson		34,446	28–27	{{{box/streak}}}
56	June 10	Dodgers	5–13	Martinez	Bielecki	Hartley	33,204	28–28	{{{box/streak}}}
57	June 11	Giants	6–8 ^{(10)}	Downs	Smith	Righetti	32,449	28–29	{{{box/streak}}}
58	June 12	Giants	6–1	Boskie	Robinson	Smith	33,880	29–29	{{{box/streak}}}
59	June 13	Giants	4–3	Bielecki	Wilson	Assenmacher	34,149	30–29	{{{box/streak}}}
60	June 14	@ Padres	7–3	Jackson	Benes	Smith	30,161	31–29	{{{box/streak}}}
61	June 15	@ Padres	2–6	Rasmussen	Bielecki		23,557	31–30	{{{box/streak}}}
62	June 16	@ Padres	2–4	Melendez	Maddux	Andersen	28,961	31–31	{{{box/streak}}}
63	June 17	@ Dodgers	4–6	Morgan	Boskie	Crews	42,767	31–32	{{{box/streak}}}
64	June 18	@ Dodgers	5–6 ^{(13)}	Hartley	Bielecki		37,402	31–33	{{{box/streak}}}
65	June 19	@ Dodgers	8–9	Howell	Assenmacher		39,287	31–34	{{{box/streak}}}
66	June 20	@ Giants	3–4	Oliveras	Lancaster	Righetti	16,408	31–35	{{{box/streak}}}
67	June 21	@ Giants	2–4	Downs	Maddux	Righetti	17,198	31–36	{{{box/streak}}}
68	June 22	@ Giants	3–6	Wilson	Boskie	Oliveras	31,841	31–37	{{{box/streak}}}
69	June 23	@ Giants	1–2	Brantley	Smith		42,389	31–38	{{{box/streak}}}
70	June 25	@ Pirates	5–1	Lancaster	Smiley		31,115	32–38	{{{box/streak}}}
71	June 26	@ Pirates	6–7	Walk	Maddux	Landrum	41,389	32–39	{{{box/streak}}}
72	June 27	@ Pirates	3–4	Palacios	Assenmacher		30,960	32–40	{{{box/streak}}}
73	June 28	Cardinals	6–14	Olivares	Scanlan		35,220	32–41	{{{box/streak}}}
74	June 29	Cardinals	6–4	Lancaster	Tewksbury	Assenmacher	34,957	33–41	{{{box/streak}}}
75	June 30	Cardinals	7–4	McElroy	DeLeon		32,736	34–41	{{{box/streak}}}
76	July 1	Pirates	6–5 ^{(13)}	Scanlan	Belinda		32,633	35–41	{{{box/streak}}}
77	July 2	Pirates	4–13	Drabek	Boskie		34,332	35–42	{{{box/streak}}}
78	July 3	Pirates	7–11	Smith	Lancaster		33,432	35–43	{{{box/streak}}}
79	July 4	Pirates	9–8 ^{(11)}	McElroy	Landrum		31,098	36–43	{{{box/streak}}}
80	July 5	@ Cardinals	5–1	Castillo	DeLeon		49,251	37–43	{{{box/streak}}}
81	July 6	@ Cardinals	12–2	Bielecki	Smith		48,313	38–43	{{{box/streak}}}
82	July 7	@ Cardinals	7–8 ^{(12)}	Fraser	Renfroe		39,595	38–44	{{{box/streak}}}
83	July 11	Astros	4–6 ^{(11)}	Osuna	Smith	Capel	32,313	38–45	{{{box/streak}}}
84	July 12	Astros	5–2	Castillo	Portugal	Assenmacher	33,772	39–45	{{{box/streak}}}
85	July 13	Astros	4–3	Lancaster	Capel		32,588	40–45	{{{box/streak}}}
86	July 14	Astros	4–3	Bielecki	Kile	Assenmacher	33,750	41–45	{{{box/streak}}}
87	July 15	@ Braves	6–4	Maddux	Smith	Assenmacher	25,057	42–45	{{{box/streak}}}
88	July 16	@ Braves	5–8	Freeman	Scanlan	Berenguer	25,893	42–46	{{{box/streak}}}
89	July 17	@ Braves	2–12	Smoltz	Lancaster		16,984	42–47	{{{box/streak}}}
90	July 19	@ Astros	2–5	Harnisch	Scanlan	Osuna	27,577	42–48	{{{box/streak}}}
91	July 20	@ Astros	6–0	Maddux	Kile		37,970	43–48	{{{box/streak}}}
92	July 21	@ Astros	4–2	Castillo	Clancy		28,847	44–48	{{{box/streak}}}
93	July 23	Reds	8–5	Lancaster	Myers	Assenmacher	34,458	45–48	{{{box/streak}}}
94	July 24	Reds	3–12	Browning	Bielecki		36,215	45–49	{{{box/streak}}}
95	July 25	Reds	5–4 ^{(13)}	Slocumb	Layana		35,008	46–49	{{{box/streak}}}
96	July 26	Braves	2–6	Avery	Castillo		35,604	46–50	{{{box/streak}}}
97	July 27	Braves	7–5	Lancaster	Smoltz	McElroy	34,023	47–50	{{{box/streak}}}
98	July 28	Braves	6–2	Bielecki	Leibrandt	Assenmacher	33,782	48–50	{{{box/streak}}}
99	July 30	@ Reds	5–6 ^{(10)}	Dibble	McElroy		37,832	48–51	{{{box/streak}}}
100	July 31	@ Reds	1–5	Rijo	Castillo	Power	36,483	48–52	{{{box/streak}}}
101	August 2	@ Mets	4–2 ^{(10)}	Assenmacher	Pena		35,361	49–52	{{{box/streak}}}
102	August 3	@ Mets	9–2	Scanlan	Viola		39,804	50–52	{{{box/streak}}}
103	August 4	@ Mets	8–3	Maddux	Cone		36,080	51–52	{{{box/streak}}}
104	August 5	@ Mets	7–2	Castillo	Schourek		27,508	52–52	{{{box/streak}}}
105	August 6	@ Phillies	2–6 ^{(11)}	Williams	Lancaster		26,562	52–53	{{{box/streak}}}
106	August 7	@ Phillies	4–5 ^{(11)}	Williams	Lancaster		26,294	52–54	{{{box/streak}}}
107	August 8	@ Phillies	1–11	Cox	Jackson		32,232	52–55	{{{box/streak}}}
108	August 9	Mets	5–4	Maddux	Cone		36,110	53–55	{{{box/streak}}}
109	August 10	Mets	6–2	Scanlan	Burke	Lancaster	35,639	54–55	{{{box/streak}}}
110	August 11	Mets	3–2 ^{(14)}	Boskie	Schourek		33,128	55–55	{{{box/streak}}}
111	August 12	Mets	3–2 ^{(10)}	Lancaster	Burke		34,342	56–55	{{{box/streak}}}
112	August 13	Expos	6–7	Sampen	Lancaster	Fassero	34,085	56–56	{{{box/streak}}}
113	August 14	Expos	0–2	Barnes	Maddux	Jones	34,817	56–57	{{{box/streak}}}
114	August 15	Expos	7–6	Assenmacher	Fassero	McElroy	33,514	57–57	{{{box/streak}}}
115	August 16	Phillies	9–1	Sutcliffe	Ruffin		34,547	58–57	{{{box/streak}}}
116	August 17	Phillies	2–5	Mulholland	Bielecki	Williams	33,223	58–58	{{{box/streak}}}
117	August 18	Phillies	7–6 ^{(10)}	Assenmacher	Williams		32,801	59–58	{{{box/streak}}}
118	August 19	@ Expos	3–2 ^{(11)}	Assenmacher	Sampen		10,792	60–58	{{{box/streak}}}
119	August 20	@ Expos	2–4	Haney	Scanlan	Rojas	12,987	60–59	{{{box/streak}}}
120	August 21	@ Expos	3–1	Sutcliffe	Nabholz	Lancaster	15,192	61–59	{{{box/streak}}}
121	August 23	Padres	5–4	Lancaster	Lefferts		33,090	62–59	{{{box/streak}}}
122	August 24	Padres	1–4	Benes	Maddux	Melendez	32,760	62–60	{{{box/streak}}}
123	August 25	Padres	9–12	Maddux	Scanlan	Melendez	31,190	62–61	{{{box/streak}}}
124	August 26	Dodgers	3–4	Gott	McElroy	Howell	31,149	62–62	{{{box/streak}}}
125	August 27	Dodgers	2–1	Castillo	Martinez		31,624	63–62	{{{box/streak}}}
126	August 28	@ Giants	8–6	Bielecki	McClellan	Assenmacher	16,230	64–62	{{{box/streak}}}
127	August 29	@ Giants	5–4	Maddux	Oliveras		19,887	65–62	{{{box/streak}}}
128	August 30	@ Dodgers	0–2	Belcher	Jackson		39,666	65–63	{{{box/streak}}}
129	August 31	@ Dodgers	2–3	McDowell	Assenmacher	Howell	46,943	65–64	{{{box/streak}}}
130	September 1	@ Dodgers	3–12	Martinez	Castillo		38,742	65–65	{{{box/streak}}}
131	September 2	@ Padres	10–8	McElroy	Melendez		12,706	66–65	{{{box/streak}}}
132	September 3	@ Padres	1–4	Benes	Maddux		9,047	66–66	{{{box/streak}}}
133	September 4	@ Padres	1–5	Rasmussen	Jackson		9,952	66–67	{{{box/streak}}}
134	September 6	Giants	3–2	Castillo	Hickerson	Smith	22,090	67–67	{{{box/streak}}}
135	September 7	Giants	2–1	Bielecki	McClellan	Assenmacher	30,821	68–67	{{{box/streak}}}
136	September 8	Giants	3–4	Wilson	Maddux	Righetti	27,875	68–68	{{{box/streak}}}
137	September 9	Pirates	10–12	Belinda	Smith	Rodriguez	18,775	68–69	{{{box/streak}}}
138	September 10	Pirates	6–2	Sutcliffe	Tomlin	Scanlan	29,299	69–69	{{{box/streak}}}
139	September 11	Mets	1–4	Castillo	Castillo	Franco	15,795	69–70	{{{box/streak}}}
140	September 12	Mets	3–6	Young	Bielecki	Whitehurst	14,324	69–71	{{{box/streak}}}
141	September 13	Expos	2–3	Martinez	Scanlan	Jones	17,668	69–72	{{{box/streak}}}
142	September 14	Expos	7–5 ^{(10)}	Scanlan	Jones		30,130	70–72	{{{box/streak}}}
143	September 15	Expos	5–6 ^{(10)}	Rojas	Assenmacher	Fassero	25,601	70–73	{{{box/streak}}}
144	September 16	@ Pirates	4–5	Smith	Castillo	Mason	16,149	70–74	{{{box/streak}}}
145	September 17	@ Pirates	2–9	Drabek	Bielecki		18,152	70–75	{{{box/streak}}}
146	September 18	@ Mets	4–1	Maddux	Viola		11,980	71–75	{{{box/streak}}}
147	September 22	Expos	2–6	Gardner	Sutcliffe			71–76	{{{box/streak}}}
148	September 22	Expos	3–5	Sampen	Castillo	Rojas	16,061	71–77	{{{box/streak}}}
149	September 23	Phillies	10–3	Maddux	Mulholland		16,141	72–77	{{{box/streak}}}
150	September 24	Phillies	2–4	Ashby	Bielecki	Williams	19,694	72–78	{{{box/streak}}}
151	September 25	Phillies	4–5	Greene	Boskie	Williams	9,892	72–79	{{{box/streak}}}
152	September 27	@ Cardinals	4–5	Tewksbury	Castillo	Smith	30,429	72–80	{{{box/streak}}}
153	September 28	@ Cardinals	2–3	Hill	Maddux	Smith	38,304	72–81	{{{box/streak}}}
154	September 29	@ Cardinals	5–3	Sutcliffe	Smith	Assenmacher	42,665	73–81	{{{box/streak}}}
155	September 30	@ Phillies	5–6	Ritchie	Assenmacher		12,109	73–82	{{{box/streak}}}
156	October 1	@ Phillies	5–6 ^{(13)}	Ruffin	Assenmacher		12,291	73–83	{{{box/streak}}}
157	October 2	@ Phillies	1–0	Maddux	de Jesus		13,680	74–83	{{{box/streak}}}
158	October 5	Cardinals	3–2	Scanlan	Fraser			75–83	{{{box/streak}}}
159	October 5	Cardinals	7–5	Perez	Agosto	Assenmacher	21,295	76–83	{{{box/streak}}}
160	October 6	Cardinals	7–3	Maddux	Olivares		17,169	77–83	{{{box/streak}}}

== Player stats ==
=== Batting ===
==== Starters by position ====
Note: Pos = Position; G = Games played; AB = At bats; H = Hits; Avg. = Batting average; HR = Home runs; RBI = Runs batted in

Pos	Player	G	AB	H	Avg.	HR	RBI
C	Rick Wilkins	86	203	45	.222	6	22
1B	Mark Grace	160	619	169	.273	8	58
2B	Ryne Sandberg	158	585	170	.291	26	100
3B	Luis Salazar	103	333	86	.258	14	38
SS	Shawon Dunston	142	492	128	.260	12	50
LF	George Bell	148	558	159	.285	25	86
CF	Jerome Walton	123	270	59	.219	5	17
RF	Andre Dawson	149	563	153	.272	31	104

==== Other batters ====
Note: G = Games played; AB = At bats; H = Hits; Avg. = Batting average; HR = Home runs; RBI = Runs batted in

Player	G	AB	H	Avg.	HR	RBI
Chico Walker	124	374	96	.257	6	34
Doug Dascenzo	118	239	61	.255	1	18
Héctor Villanueva	71	192	53	.276	13	32
Dwight Smith	90	167	38	.228	3	21
Damon Berryhill	62	159	30	.189	5	14
José Vizcaíno	93	145	38	.262	0	10
Ced Landrum	56	86	20	.233	0	6
Gary Scott	31	79	13	.165	1	5
Joe Girardi	21	47	9	.191	0	6
Rey Sánchez	13	23	6	.261	0	2
Derrick May	15	22	5	.227	1	3
Erik Pappas	7	17	3	.176	0	2
Doug Strange	3	9	4	.444	0	1

=== Pitching ===
==== Starting pitchers ====
Note: G = Games pitched; IP = Innings pitched; W = Wins; L = Losses; ERA = Earned run average; SO = Strikeouts

Player	G	IP	W	L	ERA	SO
Greg Maddux	37	263.0	15	11	3.35	198
Shawn Boskie	28	129.0	4	9	5.23	62
Frank Castillo	18	111.2	6	7	4.35	73
Rick Sutcliffe	19	96.2	6	5	4.10	52
Danny Jackson	17	70.2	1	5	6.75	31
Mike Harkey	4	18.2	0	2	5.30	15

==== Other pitchers ====
Note: G = Games pitched; IP = Innings pitched; W = Wins; L = Losses; ERA = Earned run average; SO = Strikeouts

Player	G	IP	W	L	ERA	SO
Mike Bielecki	39	172.0	13	11	4.50	72
Les Lancaster	64	156.0	9	7	3.52	102
Bob Scanlan	40	111.0	7	8	3.89	44

==== Relief pitchers ====
Note: G = Games pitched; W = Wins; L = Losses; SV = Saves; ERA = Earned run average; SO = Strikeouts

Player	G	W	L	SV	ERA	SO
Dave Smith	35	0	6	17	6.00	16
Paul Assenmacher	75	7	8	15	3.24	117
Chuck McElroy	71	6	2	3	1.95	92
Heathcliff Slocumb	52	2	1	1	3.45	34
Steve Wilson	8	0	0	0	4.38	9
Laddie Renfroe	4	0	1	0	13.50	4
Yorkis Pérez	3	1	0	0	2.08	3
Doug Dascenzo	3	0	0	0	0.00	2
Scott May	2	0	0	0	18.00	1
Dave Pavlas	1	0	0	0	18.00	0

== Farm system ==
Level	Team	League	Manager
AAA	Iowa Cubs	American Association	Jim Essian and Mick Kelleher
AA	Charlotte Knights	Southern League	Jay Loviglio
A	Winston-Salem Spirits	Carolina League	Brad Mills
A	Peoria Chiefs	Midwest League	Bill Hayes
A-Short Season	Geneva Cubs	New York–Penn League	Greg Mahlberg
Rookie	Huntington Cubs	Appalachian League	Steve Roadcap
