= Kevin Blankenship =

American baseball player (born 1963)

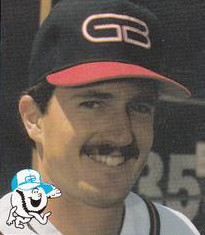
- Blankenship in 1988
- Pitcher
- Born: January 26, 1963 (age 63); Anaheim, California, U.S.
- Batted: Right Threw: Right

MLB debut
- September 20, 1988, for the Atlanta Braves

Last MLB appearance
- June 12, 1990, for the Chicago Cubs

MLB statistics
- Win–loss record: 1–3
- Earned run average: 4.59
- Strikeouts: 16
- Stats at Baseball Reference

Teams
- Atlanta Braves (1988); Chicago Cubs (1988–1990)

Kevin DeWayne Blankenship (born January 26, 1963) is a former right-handed pitcher in Major League Baseball for the Chicago Cubs and Atlanta Braves. A veteran minor league journeyman, Blankenship played in eight seasons with four different Major League Baseball farm systems during his time as a professional player. Blankenship's career highlights came in 1988 and 1989 when his stellar pitching not only earned him back-to-back minor league all-star selections but also two separate major league call-ups to pitch for the Atlanta Braves and the Chicago Cubs, respectively.

== Early career ==
Kevin Blankenship's signature

Blankenship began his baseball career at El Dorado High School, in Placentia, California where he pitched for the El Dorado Hawks varsity baseball team. He rose to prominence during his senior year in 1981, setting school records in wins, ERA, and strikeouts while leading the team to the CIF 3A championship. Blankenship was signed by the Braves as an undrafted free agent out of the University of Arizona.

He spent his minor league debut with the Rookie-level Gulf Coast League Braves in 1984 as a reliever. After posting a 1.34 ERA over 19 games, the rookie pitcher was called up to spend the summer of 1985 in North Carolina with the Durham Bulls. Blankenship split the season as both a starting and relief pitcher, posting an 8–8 record. His performance in the Single-A won the young pitcher an invitation to join the Greenville Braves, where he bounced between starting and relieving for the next two seasons.

During his third season with Greenville, Blankenship put on a breakout performance on the pitcher's mound posting a 13–9 record, a 2.34 ERA with 127 strikeouts. Now a regular starter, he finished the season earning a spot on the 1988 Southern League All-Star team and a call up to the majors by Atlanta in late 1988. He made two starts for the Braves, debuting on September 20, when he struck out the first batter he faced, San Francisco's Brett Butler. Taking the loss on both September 20 and 25, before Atlanta traded him and Kevin Coffman to the Cubs in an extraordinarily late-in-the-season deal for catcher Jody Davis.

== Chicago Cubs ==
=== 1989 season ===
He started the Cubs' final game of the season and got his first major league win, going five-plus innings and allowing four runs, defeating the Pittsburgh Pirates' Randy Kramer. Blankenship was helped out significantly by a Rafael Palmeiro grand slam that put the Cubs up 8–1 in the fifth inning.

Blankenship spent most of 1989 pitching for the Cubs' AAA team in Iowa, but was called up when rosters expanded in September and made two relief appearances for Chicago in the final month of their divisional championship season, allowing one run in 5 1/3 innings of work. He was not on the Cubs' postseason roster. In fact, in an unusual move, Cubs' manager Don Zimmer actually sent Blankenship home before the season ended after Blankenship showed up late to team events twice in a four-day period.

On September 20, 1989, the Cubs pitching coach Dick Pole awakened Blankenship in his hotel room at 11 a.m., 30 minutes after he was to be in uniform. He showed up at 11:45 a.m. And then, on September 24, 1989, Blankenship arrived 15 minutes late for an 8:30 a.m. physical. At that point, Zimmer sent Blankenship home to Fullerton, California. "I overlooked (the first infraction)", Zimmer told The Chicago Tribune, "I'm thinking to myself, 'How the hell could somebody oversleep a day game and show up at a quarter to 12?'" After the second instance of tardiness, however, Zimmer's patience ran out. "I called him into my office and said, 'Go on home.' I gave him the benefit of the doubt (previously). I could have fined him $300–$400. I can't stand being late. I sent him home. That's it. I didn't ask for any explanation."

=== 1990 season ===
Several months later, Blankenship played winter league ball in Venezuela, going 6–1 with a 1.81 earned-run average. In January 1990, Zimmer told the Chicago Sun-Times that Blankenship would be back for spring training. "That's forgotten," he told the paper. "It's over with." And in spring training 1990, Blankenship told the Sun-Times that the issue of tardiness was in his past. "We talked," Blankenship said, referring to Zimmer. "From what I gather, it won't be held against me. The problem won't pop up again unless I do something to make it. And I don't plan on doing that. Everything I know and have heard of Zim, he's not the kind of guy to hold grudges."

The 1990 Cubs had a rash of injuries to their starting pitchers, and Blankenship again found himself in the majors in May. He made just two starts, losing both. His final appearance was in relief of Mike Bielecki on June 12 in a game the Cubs ended up losing 19–8 at Wrigley Field. Blankenship allowed two runs in 2 2/3 innings on a day when Cub outfielder Doug Dascenzo pitched a scoreless ninth inning, the only Cub hurler not to allow a run that day.

== Later career ==
After spending the rest of 1990 in Iowa, Blankenship became a free agent. He signed with the Pittsburgh Pirates and pitched for their AAA farm team in Buffalo in 1991, then closed out his career pitching in Oklahoma City in 1992 for Texas's AAA affiliate. Blankenship retired after the 1992 season with a major league record of 1–3 and a 4.59 ERA.
