= Turk Wendell =

American baseball player (born 1967)

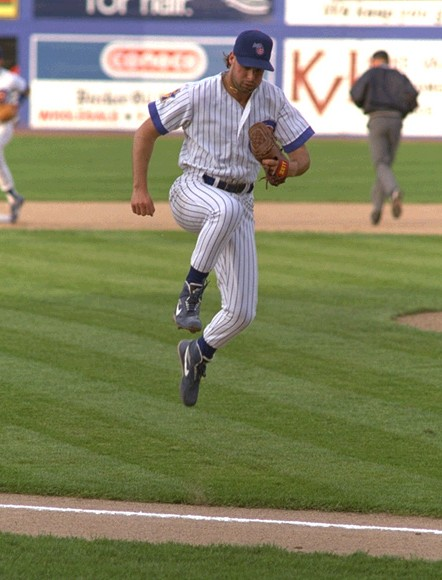
- Pitcher
- Born: May 19, 1967 (age 59); Pittsfield, Massachusetts, U.S.
- Batted: Switch Threw: Right

MLB debut
- June 17, 1993, for the Chicago Cubs

Last MLB appearance
- May 13, 2004, for the Colorado Rockies

MLB statistics
- Win–loss record: 36–33
- Earned run average: 3.93
- Strikeouts: 515
- Stats at Baseball Reference

Teams
- Chicago Cubs (1993–1997); New York Mets (1997–2001); Philadelphia Phillies (2001, 2003); Colorado Rockies (2004)

Steven John "Turk" Wendell (born May 19, 1967) is an American former professional baseball right-handed relief pitcher, who played in Major League Baseball (MLB) for four National League (NL) teams, in all or parts of 11 seasons, between 1993 and 2004. As a batter, Wendell was a switch hitter, with all three of his lifetime hits coming from the left side of the plate.

Wendell was drafted by the Atlanta Braves in the 5th round (112th overall) of the 1988 Major League Baseball draft. He made his professional debut with the Pulaski Braves of the Appalachian League in June 1988. Traded to the Cubs in 1991, Wendell made his first big league appearance on June 17, 1993.

Wendell was a relief pitcher who threw a four-seam fastball, a two-seam fastball, a slider, and a change-up. He was regarded as having above-average control, average pitch movement, below-average power, and a good pick-off move.

Wendell was named the most superstitious athlete of all time by Men's Journal.

== College career ==
Wendell attended Wahconah Regional High School in Dalton, Massachusetts and then Quinnipiac University, where he is among the school's all-time leaders in strikeouts (single season) and earned run average. Wendell played his summer baseball during college with the independent Dalton Collegians and in 1987 with the Falmouth Commodores of the Cape Cod League.

== Career ==
=== Professional beginnings ===
Toward the end of the 1991 big-league season, Atlanta traded Wendell and fellow pitcher Yorkis Pérez to the Chicago Cubs for catcher Damon Berryhill and pitcher Mike Bielecki.

Wendell pitched in the Cubs' minor league system for two years before making his major league debut in 1993 in a start against the Cardinals. Wendell started three more games in 1993 and appeared as a reliever in three others, finishing the season 1–2 with a 4.37 ERA. The following season, which was cut short by a strike, he had two starts and four relief appearances and finished the year 0–1 with an 11.93 ERA.

=== Established reliever ===
After the 1994 season, Wendell moved permanently to the bullpen and began making regular relief appearances for the Cubs. His best year for the Cubs came in 1996, when he appeared in 70 games, recording 18 saves and a 2.84 ERA. Toward the end of the 1997 season, Wendell was traded to the New York Mets, where he spent four and a half seasons. As a Met, Wendell posted a 3.34 ERA and a 22–14 record in 285 appearances. He led the team in games pitched in the 1999 and 2000 seasons. Wendell appeared in the playoffs twice, in 1999 and 2000, and pitched in the 2000 World Series against the Yankees.

In both Chicago and New York, Wendell became known for his many habits and superstitions, including jumping over the foul lines on his way to and from the mound, brushing his teeth between innings, slamming the rosin bag into the mound before facing batters and chewing black licorice. His unique on-field personality made him popular among both Cubs and Mets fans.

=== Later career ===
In the middle of a disappointing 2001 season, the Mets traded Wendell and fellow veteran reliever Dennis Cook to the Philadelphia Phillies in exchange for pitcher Bruce Chen and a minor league prospect. Wendell expressed excitement at the opportunity to join the Phillies, who were in the midst of an ultimately unsuccessful playoff race at the time. "It's kind of sad to leave a place you're comfortable with, but we're going into a situation where we have a chance to be a part of something very special," Wendell said. "That's what we all work for from the first day of spring training. It's kind of like a new life."

After missing the entire 2002 season due to an elbow injury, Wendell returned to pitch in 56 games for the Phillies in 2003, with a 3–3 record and a 3.38 ERA.

After the 2003 season, Wendell became a free agent, and was not re-signed by the Phillies. Offered a guaranteed major league contract for $900,000 by the Florida Marlins, Wendell instead signed a minor league deal with the Colorado Rockies, as it was close to the Colorado home he shared with his family. That season, Wendell posted a 7.02 ERA in 12 games before getting sent down to Colorado's Triple A affiliate for a rehab stint, where he similarly pitched poorly in 12 games. The Rockies released Wendell at the end of July.

Wendell signed a minor league contract with the Houston Astros in early 2005, but failed to earn a spot on the team's major league roster in spring training, after which he retired. “It was never stated or announced,” Wendell later said.

== Notable statements ==
Wendell repeatedly denounced steroids in baseball and the players he suspected of using them. As a pitcher for the Colorado Rockies in 2004, Wendell became the first major leaguer to publicly accuse Barry Bonds, whose trainer had just been indicted for providing steroids to players, of using performance-enhancing drugs. "It's clear just seeing his body," Wendell told the Denver Post. Bonds reacted, telling reporters, "If you've got something to say, say it to my face. Don't talk through the media." In March 2006, Wendell was quoted by the suburban Chicago Daily Herald as saying that former Cubs teammate Sammy Sosa "of course" used steroids. Wendell alleged that Sosa's home run totals increased significantly only after he began using steroids. He also stated that "everybody in baseball" (including coaches, managers, and owners) knew about steroid use by players such as Sosa, and that he agreed with the information in José Canseco's book Juiced.

In a 2010 interview, Wendell ridiculed excuses and apologies from stars who admitted to using performance-enhancing drugs. "When Mark McGwire said he wished he had never played in this era, that [ticked] me off because he had the same choices I did," Wendell said. "He didn't have to take a shortcut and cheat like that. If he feels that badly about it, give the owners back the money that he took from them."

In early 2001, after Vladimir Guerrero (then playing for the Montreal Expos) took exception to being hit by Wendell, Wendell remarked, "One of the ways to get him out is pitching inside and if he can’t handle being pitched inside, he should go frickin' back to the Dominican and find another line of work."

Less than a month later, Wendell was ejected from a game against the St. Louis Cardinals for throwing behind batter Mike Matheny. After the game, Wendell referred to Cardinals' pitcher Rick Ankiel, whose mysterious loss of control would soon end his pitching career: "When Ankiel is out there and he throws balls everywhere, why don't they throw him out of the game?"

On the eve of the 2000 World Series between the Yankees and the Mets, Wendell is quoted as having said "Yankee Stadium? I don't give a hoot about it. We've played there before. It won't be a surprise. The Yankees have tortured us for years and years, and beating them would be sweet for me." During the Yankees celebration of their win, it is reported that every five minutes, someone would call for a toast "To Turk Wendell!"

Wendell repeatedly told reporters that he wanted to play his last season in baseball for free. "I want my last season to be a testament to the game," Wendell said in 2000. "I only wanted a few things out of life – a wife, children, to play baseball and to hunt deer." When informed that the Major League Baseball Players Association would not allow him to play for free, Wendell said, "then I'll drop out of the union when the time comes."

== Personal life ==
Wendell was recognized for significant charity work during and after his career. Wendell was given the "Good Guy Award" by the New York Press Photographers Association in 2000.

In October 2006, he visited troops stationed in Afghanistan as part of the "Heroes of the Diamond Tour". He said he was so inspired by the trip that he enlisted in the Army upon return but was denied active combat duty eligibility because he is color-blind.

Wendell owns Wykota Ranch, a 200-acre hunting and fishing camp in Larkspur, Colorado Wendell's son, Wyatt Wendell, played collegiate baseball for Purdue University. After college he signed as an undrafted free agent with the Arizona Diamondbacks, and joined their minor-league system. His daughter, Dakota, plays collegiate soccer for the Minnesota State University, Mankato Mavericks.

In or around 2003, former Mets teammate Jerrod Riggan named his son after Wendell.
