= Rick Wrona =

American baseball player (born 1963)

- Catcher
- Born: December 10, 1963 (age 62); Tulsa, Oklahoma, U.S.
- Batted: Right Threw: Right

MLB debut
- September 3, 1988, for the Chicago Cubs

Last MLB appearance
- July 22, 1994, for the Milwaukee Brewers

MLB statistics
- Batting average: .244
- Home runs: 3
- Runs batted in: 18
- Stats at Baseball Reference

Teams
- Chicago Cubs (1988–1990); Cincinnati Reds (1992); Chicago White Sox (1993); Milwaukee Brewers (1994)

Richard James Wrona (born December 10, 1963) is an American former professional baseball player. He played parts of six seasons in Major League Baseball, between 1988 and 1994, for the Chicago Cubs, Cincinnati Reds, Chicago White Sox, and Milwaukee Brewers, primarily as a catcher.

== Baseball career ==
Wrona played high school baseball at Bishop Kelley High School and college ball for Wichita State University. After being drafted by the Cubs in the 5th round of the 1985 Major League Baseball draft, he spent several seasons in the minor leagues before making his major league debut on September 3, 1988, as a pinch hitter against the Reds.

The next year, with Joe Girardi and Damon Berryhill, the Cubs two primary catchers, both spending time in the minor leagues, Wrona found himself spending a good part of the season in the majors as well. The Cubs carried all three catchers for the National League Championship Series against the San Francisco Giants. The Giants won the series 4 games to 1. Wrona enjoyed no success in the series, going 0-for-5 with 3 strikeouts while appearing in two games.

Wrona never played a full season in the major leagues. A career backup, he played no more than 38 games, nor had more than 92 at bats, in any one season. Only in 1989 did Wrona play more than 16 games or log more than 29 at bats in the majors. He played his final major league game as a member of the Brewers on July 22, 1994, although he continued to play in the minor leagues until 1998.
