= José Núñez (right-handed pitcher) =

Dominican baseball player (born 1960)

- Pitcher
- Born: January 13, 1964 (age 62); Jarabacoa, Dominican Republic
- Batted: Right Threw: Right

Professional debut
- MLB: April 9, 1987, for the Toronto Blue Jays
- CPBL: March 13, 1993, for the Uni-President Lions
- NPB: March 31, 1996, for the Fukuoka Daiei Hawks
- KBO: April 8, 2001, for the Hanwha Eagles

Last appearance
- MLB: October 1, 1990, for the Chicago Cubs
- CPBL: October 11, 1995, for the Uni-President Lions
- NPB: July 28, 1997, for the Fukuoka Daiei Hawks
- KBO: May 23, 2001, for the Hanwha Eagles

MLB statistics
- Win–loss record: 9–10
- Earned run average: 5.05
- Strikeouts: 171

CPBL statistics
- Win–loss record: 56–25
- Earned run average: 2.14
- Strikeouts: 511

NPB statistics
- Win–loss record: 7–11
- Earned run average: 3.27
- Strikeouts: 105

KBO statistics
- Win–loss record: 2–1
- Earned run average: 5.52
- Strikeouts: 19
- Stats at Baseball Reference

Teams
- Toronto Blue Jays (1987–1989); Chicago Cubs (1990); Uni-President Lions (1993–1995); Fukuoka Daiei Hawks (1996–1997); Hanwha Eagles (2001)

Career highlights and awards
- Taiwan Series champion (1995)

José Núñez Jiménez (born January 13, 1964) is a Dominican former professional baseball pitcher. He was signed by the Kansas City Royals as a free agent in 1983 and pitched in Major League Baseball for the Toronto Blue Jays (1987-1989) and Chicago Cubs (1990). Núñez is currently a pitching coach in the Milwaukee Brewers minor league system.

After leaving the major leagues, Núñez enjoyed a long and prosperous career in Asia, playing for the Uni-President Lions (1993–1995), Fukuoka Daiei Hawks (1996–1997), Taichung Agan (1998) and Hanwha Eagles (2001). He shares the Taiwanese professional baseball record of winning the most games in a single season (22 wins in 1993), along with Chen Yi-Hsin.
