= Lance Dickson =

American baseball player (born 1969)

- Pitcher
- Born: October 19, 1969 (age 56); Fullerton, California
- Batted: Right Threw: Left

MLB debut
- August 9, 1990, for the Chicago Cubs

Last MLB appearance
- August 18, 1990, for the Chicago Cubs

MLB statistics
- Win–loss record: 0–3
- Earned run average: 7.24
- Strikeouts: 4
- Stats at Baseball Reference

Teams
- Chicago Cubs (1990)

Lance Michael Dickson (born October 19, 1969) is an American former professional baseball pitcher. He played in 3 games in Major League Baseball (MLB) for the Chicago Cubs in 1990. He threw left–handed and batted right–handed.

== Amateur career ==
Dickson was born in Fullerton, California, and graduated from Grossmont High School in El Cajon in 1987. He was drafted by the Houston Astros in the 37th round (953rd overall) of the 1987 MLB draft. Dickson did not sign with the team, opting to go to college and try to improve his draft prospects. He attended the University of Arizona, and in 1989 he played collegiate summer baseball with the Orleans Cardinals of the Cape Cod Baseball League, where he was named the most valuable pitcher of the league's All-Star Game.

== Professional career ==
Dickson was selected in the first round of the 1990 Major League Baseball draft (23rd overall) by the Chicago Cubs, and signed with them seven days later.

Dickson played in 11 minor league games and went 7–3 with an 0.94 ERA and 111 strikeouts over 76 1/3 innings. After this performance he was called up to the major leagues and made his debut as the Cubs' starting pitcher on August 9, 1990. The second-youngest player in the league at the time of his promotion, Dickson's big-league career was nonetheless short-lived. He went 0–3 with a 7.24 ERA in his three starts, precipitating his return to the Triple–A Iowa Cubs. His last major league appearance was August 18.

After Dickson went back to the minor leagues, he was chosen by the American Association managers as the best pitching prospect and possessor of the best breaking ball in the league. His record was 4-3 and had a 2.86 ERA in his 15 starts. Dickson led the league with 92 strikeouts in 91 innings before he was injured by a stress fracture in his right foot in June 1991. During the following offseason, he underwent arm surgery, and made only one start in 1992 as a result.

Dickson split the 1993 campaign between the High–A Daytona Cubs, Double–A Orlando Cubs, and Iowa. In 14 starts for the three affiliates, he accumulated a 3–6 record and 4.08 ERA with 67 strikeouts across 70 2/3 innings pitched. Dickson made 4 starts for Triple–A Iowa in 1994, recording a 4.91 ERA with 17 strikeouts over 14 2/3 innings of work.

Dickson retired from baseball in 1995, having made only two scoreless appearances for the rookie–level Gulf Coast League Cubs during the season.
