= Jerome Walton =

American baseball player (born 1965)

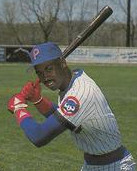
- Walton in 1988
- Center fielder
- Born: July 8, 1965 (age 61); Newnan, Georgia, U.S.
- Batted: Right Threw: Right

MLB debut
- April 4, 1989, for the Chicago Cubs

Last MLB appearance
- May 6, 1998, for the Tampa Bay Devil Rays

MLB statistics
- Batting average: .269
- Home runs: 25
- Runs batted in: 132
- Stats at Baseball Reference

Teams
- Chicago Cubs (1989–1992); California Angels (1993); Cincinnati Reds (1994–1995); Atlanta Braves (1996); Baltimore Orioles (1997); Tampa Bay Devil Rays (1998)

Career highlights and awards
- NL Rookie of the Year (1989)

Jerome O'Terrell Walton (born July 8, 1965) is an American former Major League Baseball center fielder who played for the Chicago Cubs, California Angels, Cincinnati Reds, Atlanta Braves, Baltimore Orioles, and Tampa Bay Devil Rays, between 1989 and 1998. He batted and threw right-handed. Walton was born in Newnan, Georgia.

== Baseball career ==
He graduated from Newnan High School in Newnan, and went on to attend Enterprise State Junior College. Walton was drafted in the second round (36th overall) of the 1986 Major League Baseball draft by the Chicago Cubs. Walton made his major league debut on April 4, 1989, as a Chicago Cub. He was named the 1989 National League Rookie of the Year (the first Cub to be so honored since Ken Hubbs in 1962), playing in 116 games, batting .293 with 24 stolen bases and a 30-game hitting streak.

Walton received votes for the Most Valuable Player Award to go alongside his Rookie of the Year season, finishing 13th. In the 1989 National League Championship Series, he batted .364 with eight hits as the Cubs lost in five games. He played three further seasons with the Cubs for a combined 254 games, where he batted as high as .263 in 1990 and as low as .127 in 1992. He became a free agent after the year and signed with the California Angels for the 1993 season. However, he played just five games for the Angels, going 0-for-2 with a walk, a stolen base, and two runs before being released. He signed with the Cincinnati Reds for the 1994 season, and he batted .309 in 46 games. He then played in 102 games of the following year and batted .290. In the postseason, he made eleven combined plate appearances and walked once while not collecting a hit. He then moved to the Atlanta Braves for the 1996 season, where he played in 37 games while batting .340. One more postseason run came with the Baltimore Orioles in 1997, although he once again did not collect a hit in four total plate appearances. He closed his career out in 1998 by playing twelve total games with the expansion team Tampa Bay Devil Rays, where he had eleven hits before being cut in May.

In a 10-year major league career, Walton compiled a .269 batting average with 25 home runs, 132 runs batted in and 58 stolen bases, mostly in a reserve role. While early in his Cub career, Walton's fans used a "Jerome-O-Meter" to track his batting average. The gimmick was a spin-off of the "Shawon-O-Meter," used during Walton's rookie season of 1989 to track the average of Cubs shortstop Shawon Dunston.
