= Jeff Pico =

American baseball player & coach (born 1966)

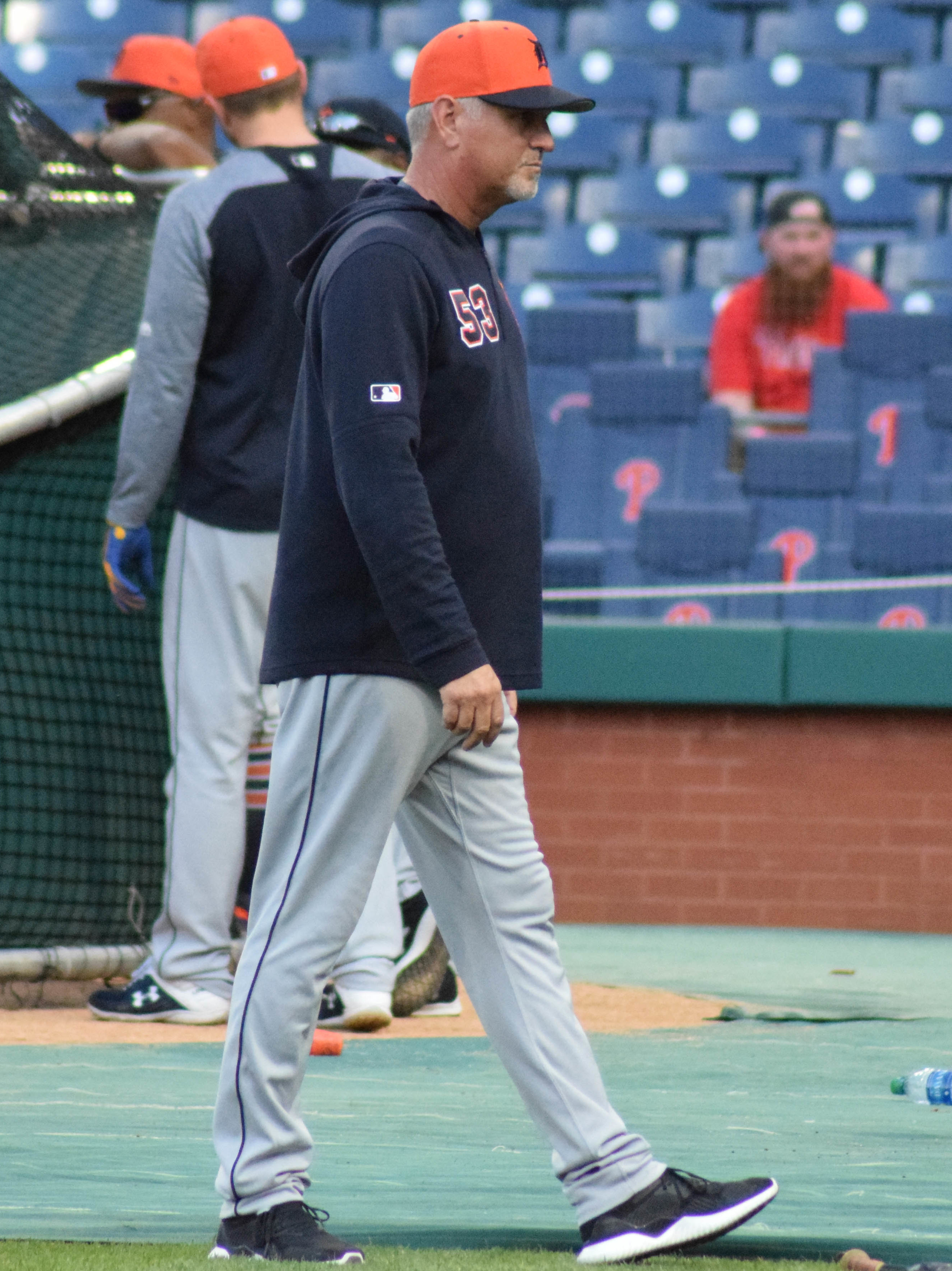
- Pico with the Detroit Tigers in 2019
- Pitcher
- Born: February 12, 1966 (age 60); Antioch, California, U.S.
- Batted: Right Threw: Right

MLB debut
- May 31, 1988, for the Chicago Cubs

Last MLB appearance
- September 9, 1990, for the Chicago Cubs

MLB statistics
- Win–loss record: 13–12
- Earned run average: 4.24
- Strikeouts: 132
- Stats at Baseball Reference

Teams
- As player: Chicago Cubs (1988–1990); As coach: Cincinnati Reds (2014–2015); Detroit Tigers (2018–2020)

Jeffrey Mark Pico (born February 12, 1966) is an American former professional baseball pitcher and current coach. He played in Major League Baseball (MLB) for the Chicago Cubs.

== Early life ==
Pico was born in Antioch, California, and attended Antioch High School. His teammates included former Toronto Blue Jays pitcher Alex Sanchez and PGA Tour pro Larry Silveira. In his sophomore year Pico posted a 7–3 season with a 1.53 ERA. Named Most Valuable Player during both his junior and senior years, the 6’2", 170-lb. pitcher had a 6–0 record in 1984 when the team won the North Coast championship. He is one of four Antioch players to have his baseball jersey retired.

== Playing career ==
Pico was drafted in the 13th round of the 1984 MLB draft by the Chicago Cubs. With his major league pitching debut on May 31, 1988, against the Cincinnati Reds, Pico threw a four-hit shutout and was the first Cubs pitcher to throw a shutout in his major league debut since Bill Lee on May 7, 1934, against the Philadelphia Phillies. Pico played three seasons and appeared in 113 games from 1988 through 1990; he had a career ERA of 4.24. In his best preseason, 1989, he had an ERA of 3.77 and a 3–1 record. His major league career posted a winning lifetime 13–12 record in 295 career innings.

== Coaching career ==
Pico began coaching after he retired as a pitcher, and was the pitching coach for the Chico Heat from 1997 to 2002. In 2003, Pico joined the Arizona Diamondbacks organization and was with the organization until 2013. He was the pitching coach for the South Bend Silver Hawks in 2004, the Lancaster JetHawks in 2006, the Visalia Oaks in 2007 and the Mobile BayBears in 2008 and 2009. Pico was pitching coordinator from 2010 to 2011, and the Arizona Diamondbacks' minor-league field coordinator in 2011 and 2012.

In November 2013, Pico was hired as the pitching coach for the Cincinnati Reds to replace Bryan Price who was promoted from pitching coach to manager for the Reds. On October 22, 2015, it was announced that the Reds would not renew Pico's contract for the 2016 season.

On December 2, 2015, Pico was named the pitching coach for the Triple-A Toledo Mud Hens.

On June 28, 2018, Pico was named the bullpen coach for the Detroit Tigers.
