= Jim Essian =

American baseball player (born 1951)

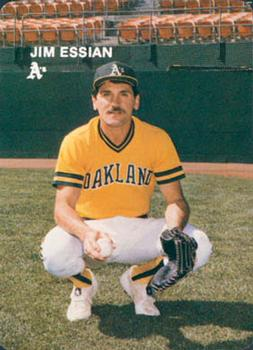
- Catcher / Manager
- Born: January 2, 1951 (age 75); Detroit, Michigan, U.S.
- Batted: Right Threw: Right

MLB debut
- September 15, 1973, for the Philadelphia Phillies

Last MLB appearance
- September 30, 1984, for the Oakland Athletics

MLB statistics
- Batting average: .244
- Home runs: 33
- Runs batted in: 307
- Managerial record: 59–63
- Winning %: .484
- Stats at Baseball Reference
- Managerial record at Baseball Reference

Teams
- As player: Philadelphia Phillies (1973–1975); Chicago White Sox (1976–1977); Oakland Athletics (1978–1980); Chicago White Sox (1981); Seattle Mariners (1982); Cleveland Indians (1983); Oakland Athletics (1984); As manager: Chicago Cubs (1991)

James Sarkis Essian, Jr. (born January 2, 1951) is an American former professional baseball player, coach, and manager. He played in Major League Baseball (MLB) as a catcher for the Philadelphia Phillies, Chicago White Sox, Oakland Athletics, Seattle Mariners, and Cleveland Indians.

After his playing career, Essian served as a coach with the Chicago Cubs organization in 1986. After managing in the minor leagues, he became the Cubs manager in 1991. Essian was inducted into the Reading Baseball Hall of Fame in 2000.

== Baseball career ==
Born in Detroit, Michigan, Essian was signed at age 18 by the Philadelphia Phillies as an undrafted amateur free agent, out of Arizona State in 1969. He made his major league debut at the age of 22 with the Phillies on September 15, 1973. He continued to bounce back and forth from the major leagues to the minors for the next few seasons.

Having amassed only 24 major league at-bats during three seasons with the Phillies, on May 7, 1975, Essian was traded (along with Barry Bonnell and cash considerations) to the Atlanta Braves for Dick Allen and Johnny Oates; on May 15, Essian was selected by the Chicago White Sox (from Atlanta), as the player to be named later, thereby completing the December 1974 trade in which the Braves had originally acquired Allen from the White Sox.

Essian was with the White Sox the next two seasons, seeing his most extensive playing time. In 1976, he finished second to Rick Dempsey among American League catchers in caught stealing percentage. He had his best year offensively in 1977 when he hit 10 home runs and had 44 runs batted in along with a .374 on base percentage, all of which were career highs. In 1978, Essian was traded to the Oakland Athletics, where he appeared in a career-high 126 games played. In 1979, he led American League catchers in range factor.

After three seasons with the Oakland Athletics, he returned to the White Sox in 1981 where, he served as a back up catcher to future Baseball Hall of Fame member Carlton Fisk. On December 11, 1981, Essian was traded with Todd Cruz and Rod Allen to the Seattle Mariners for Tom Paciorek. Essian spent the next few seasons as a reserve catcher for the Cleveland Indians and the Athletics. At the age of 33, he retired following his release by the Athletics at the end of spring training, on March 31, 1985.

After he was released by Oakland in spring training of 1985, Essian signed with the Minor League Baseball (MiLB) Miami Marlins of the Florida State League. The Marlins were an independent team, meaning they were not affiliated with any major league club. Though the Marlins were a Single-A team, ownership was aggressive in signing former major league players in order to increase interest and game attendance. The Marlins added Essian and such fading big league players as Broderick Perkins, Juan Eichelberger, Derrel Thomas, Ed Farmer, and Mike Torrez. However, this plan backfired, after manager Tom Burgess was unable to get much out of his squad of former major leaguers and marginal prospects. Burgess was fired and Essian took over as manager. The team finished 58-83. 1985 was Essian's final season as an active player.

== Coach and manager ==
Essian became a coach for the Chicago Cubs, and in 1991 he became manager of the club after Don Zimmer was fired; Essian finished that year with a won-loss record of 59-63.

He became the first MLB manager of Armenian heritage. A Cubs blog, "Hire Jim Essian," was named in honor of the former Cubs manager and has an author patterned after him named "Skip", due to Essian's insistence that his former players refer to him as "Skip Johnson".

Essian is the head coach of the Greek National Baseball Team and in 2017, he became the manager of the Utica Unicorns of the United Shore Professional Baseball League where he's won three USPBL championships, with three in a row from 2019 to 2021.

== Managerial record ==
Team	Year	Regular season					Postseason			
Team	Year	Games	Won	Lost	Win %	Finish	Won	Lost	Win %	Result
CHC	1991	112	59	63	.484	4th in NL East				
Total		112	59	63	.484					
