= Mike Bielecki =

American baseball player (born 1959)

- Pitcher
- Born: July 31, 1959 (age 67); Baltimore, Maryland, U.S.
- Batted: Right Threw: Right

MLB debut
- September 14, 1984, for the Pittsburgh Pirates

Last MLB appearance
- August 16, 1997, for the Atlanta Braves

MLB statistics
- Win–loss record: 70–73
- Earned run average: 4.18
- Strikeouts: 783
- Stats at Baseball Reference

Teams
- Pittsburgh Pirates (1984–1987); Chicago Cubs (1988–1991); Atlanta Braves (1991–1992); Cleveland Indians (1993); Atlanta Braves (1994); California Angels (1995); Atlanta Braves (1996–1997)

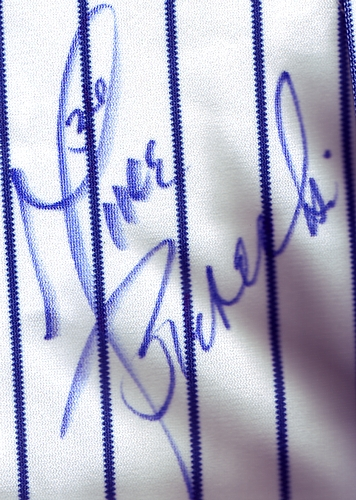
Mike Bielecki's signature

Michael Joseph Bielecki (/bɪˈlɛkiː/ bih-LEK-ee; born July 31, 1959) is an American former professional baseball pitcher. He played in Major League Baseball (MLB) for the Pittsburgh Pirates, Chicago Cubs, Atlanta Braves, Cleveland Indians, and California Angels.

== Major league career ==
=== Pittsburgh Pirates ===
After graduating from Dundalk High School, Bielecki attended Loyola College in Maryland for the 1977 –78 academic year. He pitched for the Greyhounds for only one season due to the university discontinuing its intercollegiate baseball program in the autumn of 1978. Bielecki was drafted by the Pittsburgh Pirates in the first round, with the eighth pick of the 1979 amateur draft (secondary phase). He made his debut on September 14, 1984. Bielecki spent the next four seasons with the Pirates, only playing full-time in 1986, finishing that season with a 6–11 record and a 4.66 ERA.

=== Chicago Cubs ===
In 1989, Bielecki won a career high 18 games for the Cubs and finished ninth in Cy Young Award voting. He was nicknamed "BOOM BOOM" Bielecki by Steve Stone for the two-run single he collected against the Pittsburgh Pirates in a game on April 13, 1991. Bielecki pitched the first night game ever at Wrigley Field, on August 9, 1988.

=== Cleveland Indians ===
In 1993, as an Indian, Bielecki had been invited to join Steve Olin, Tim Crews and Bob Ojeda on a fishing boat in spring training, but declined. The subsequent crash of the boat killed Olin and Crews, and nearly killed Ojeda. Bielecki didn't stay long in Cleveland; he ended the season pitching for the Baltimore Orioles AAA farm team.

=== California Angels ===
In 1995 Bielecki pitched for the California Angels, and had a 5.97 ERA in 22 appearances with the team.

=== Atlanta Braves ===
Bielecki pitched in three separate stints for the Braves. He joined them for the first time near the end of the 1991 season, when he and Damon Berryhill were traded from the Cubs in exchange for Turk Wendell and Yorkis Perez. Bielecki returned in 1994 and again in 1996, pitching primarily out of the bullpen. In the latter year, he made six appearances in the postseason and did not give up a run while striking out twelve batters. He concluded his career by pitching in a career-high fifty games, all in relief, in 1997.
