= Damon Berryhill =

American baseball player (born 1963)

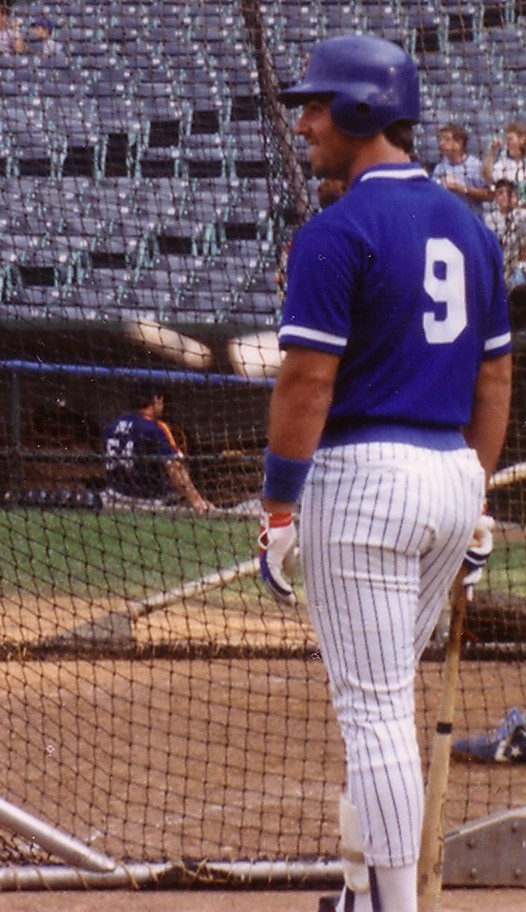
- Berryhill with the Chicago Cubs in 1988
- Catcher
- Born: December 3, 1963 (age 62); South Laguna, California, U.S.
- Batted: Switch Threw: Right

MLB debut
- September 5, 1987, for the Chicago Cubs

Last MLB appearance
- October 3rd, 1997, for the San Francisco Giants

MLB statistics
- Batting average: .240
- Home runs: 47
- Runs batted in: 257
- Stats at Baseball Reference

Teams
- Chicago Cubs (1987–1991); Atlanta Braves (1991–1993); Boston Red Sox (1994); Cincinnati Reds (1995); San Francisco Giants (1997)

Damon Scott Berryhill (born December 3, 1963) is an American former professional baseball catcher and former manager of the AAA Gwinnett Stripers. He played ten seasons for the Chicago Cubs, the Atlanta Braves, the Boston Red Sox, the Cincinnati Reds, and the San Francisco Giants of the Major League Baseball (MLB) from 1987 to 1997. He threw right and was a switch hitter.

Berryhill went to high school at Laguna Beach High School where he was MVP of the baseball team, and went to college at Orange Coast Community College.

== Career ==
=== Chicago Cubs ===
He was originally drafted by the Chicago White Sox in the 13th round of the January 1983 amateur draft, but did not sign with them. He played another year at Orange Coast and was drafted in 1984 by the Chicago Cubs with the 4th pick of the January 1984 amateur draft. He signed with the Cubs on June 2 and began his professional career.

Berryhill began his minor league career in 1984 with the Quad City Cubs, and played 62 games with them. The following season, he played for the Winston-Salem Spirits, Chicago's high A-class affiliate. He continued to move up the ranks in the following seasons, playing for the Pittsfield Cubs in 1986 and the Iowa Cubs in 1987. He was named to the American Association All-Star team for Iowa after batting .287 and hitting 18 home runs.

Berryhill was called up to the major leagues at the end of the 1987 minor league season, and made his major league debut on September 5 against the Cincinnati Reds. He had one hit in two at-bats in his debut, with his first hit a single to center field off of Rob Murphy in the bottom of the ninth.

He was selected to the 1988 Topps All-Star Rookie Roster as he hit .259 in 95 games for the Cubs that season.

He was the most commonly used starting catcher for the division-winning 1989 Cubs. In 5 seasons with the Cubs, he played in 277 games and hit .239 as he was primarily a backup catcher in 1990–91.

=== Atlanta Braves ===
Berryhill was traded to the Atlanta Braves on September 29, 1991, along with pitcher Mike Bielecki in exchange for pitchers Yorkis Perez and Turk Wendell.

He hit a game-winning three-run home run for the Braves in Game 1 of the 1992 World Series against the Toronto Blue Jays. He played in 217 games for the Braves through 1993, batting .236.

=== 1994–98 ===
He signed as a free agent with the Boston Red Sox on February 1, 1994, and played in 82 games with the Red Sox during the 1994 season. He hit .263.

Berryhill signed with the Cincinnati Reds on November 4, 1994, playing in 34 games and batting .183 before being sustaining an elbow injury. He was released on February 26, 1996, and he sat out the 1996 season while recovering from elbow surgery.

He signed as a free agent with the San Francisco Giants on January 6, 1997. As a backup catcher for the Giants, he played in 73 games in 1996 and hit .257.

He subsequently signed a minor league contract with the Oakland Athletics on November 22, 1997, and he played in 21 games for the AAA Edmonton Trappers, where he batted .257 before he was released.

=== Coaching career ===
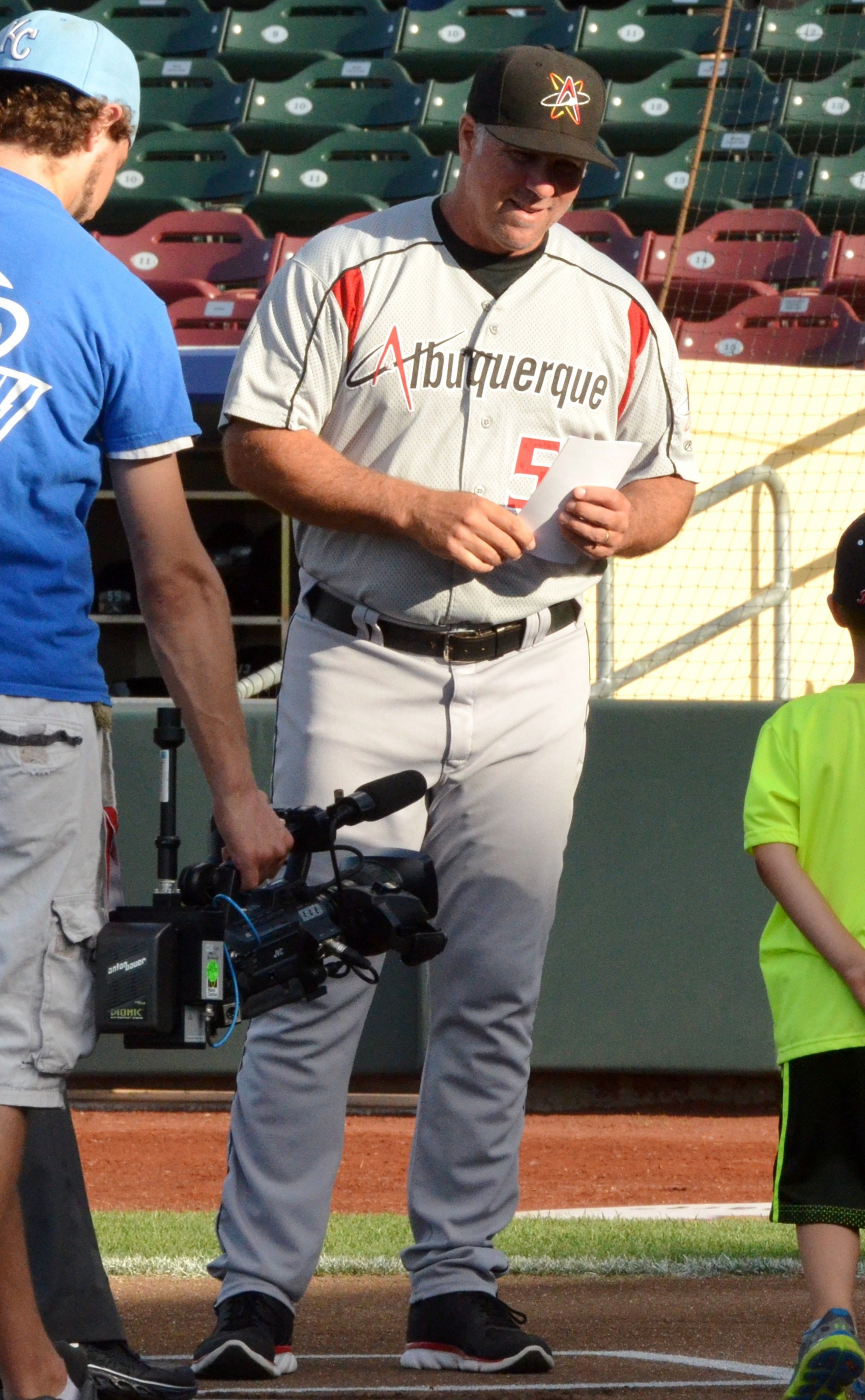
Berryhill as manager for the Albuquerque Isotopes in 2014

He was a coach for the Rancho Cucamonga Quakes in 2002 and minor league catching coordinator for the Texas Rangers in 2006.

In 2008, he managed the Bakersfield Blaze of the California League. In 2009–13 he was the manager of the Ogden Raptors. He was named the manager of the Albuquerque Isotopes of the Pacific Coast League for 2014. The Dodgers changed AAA affiliates in 2015 and he became the manager of the Oklahoma City Dodgers. He led the AAA Dodgers to a division title and was selected as PCL Manager of the Year. Despite that, the Dodgers chose not to renew his contract at the end of the season. On December 12, 2016, it was announced that Berryhill would serve as manager for Atlanta's AAA affiliate, the Gwinnett Braves.

Preceded by Matt Nokes	Topps Rookie All-Star Catcher; 1988	Succeeded by Bob Geren
Preceded by Lorenzo Bundy	Albuquerque Isotopes Manager; 2014	Succeeded by Glenallen Hill
