= Héctor Villanueva =

Puerto Rican baseball player (born 1964)

- Catcher
- Born: October 2, 1964 (age 61); Río Piedras, Puerto Rico
- Batted: Right Threw: Right

MLB debut
- June 1, 1990, for the Chicago Cubs

Last MLB appearance
- June 13, 1993, for the St. Louis Cardinals

MLB statistics
- Batting average: .230
- Home runs: 25
- Runs batted in: 72
- Stats at Baseball Reference

Teams
- Chicago Cubs (1990–1992); St. Louis Cardinals (1993)

Member of the Caribbean

Baseball Hall of Fame
- Induction: 2015

Héctor José Alberto Villanueva Balasquide (born October 2, 1964) is a Puerto Rican former professional baseball player who played catcher in the Major Leagues from 1990 to 1993.

In 1991, he became the fourth player in the history of the Puerto Rico Baseball League to win the triple crown.

== Career ==
Héctor Villanueva attended Cupeyville High School in Rio Piedras, Puerto Rico. He later went to the University of Alabama at Birmingham because his parents insisted that he attend college. His father was a salesman and his mother Lourdes was a schoolteacher. On March 26, 1985, he was signed as a free agent by a scout from the Cubs named Joaquin Velilla. Hector married Gizelle Krebs on December 26, 1987. They have four children, Alana, Soleil, Omar, and Joshua.

In 1986 he had a .318 average, with 13 home runs and 100 RBIs during his second season playing Class-A baseball for the Carolina league. He then advanced to Double-A and played in the Eastern league. Other catchers that eventually became big league players were in the Cubs system, including Joe Girardi and Rick Wrona so Héctor began to play mostly at first base. By 1989 he had reached Triple-A in the American Association league with a .252 batting average, 15 home runs, and 57 RBIs. During the winter he played baseball in Puerto Rico where he excelled as a player for different teams, which included, Los Cangrejeros de Santurce, Los Senadores de San Juan, and the Leones de Ponce. In 1990 he made his Major League debut for the Chicago Cubs against the St. Louis Cardinals as a pinch-hitter replacing Mark Grace. In his first at-bat, he popped up to second base. He stayed in the game playing first base and in his second at-bat he hit a two-run-homer that was estimated to be 430-feet. As a rookie for the Cubs, he hit 3 home runs in his first 6 games. After catcher Damon Berryhill returned from shoulder surgery, Villanueva became the number-three receiver on the team. He drew a cult-like following while he was in Chicago some in part was due to the comedic way announcer Harry Caray would mispronounce his name. He ended his rookie season with a .276 average, 13 home runs and 32 RBIs in 192 at-bats. In December 1992 he signed with the St. Louis Cardinals and made the roster in 1993 as a backup catcher. However, Hector did not hit very well that year and had a .175 batting average. He was later sent down to the minors to play in Louisville. He was somewhat successful playing in Louisville but never garnered momentum and was eventually released in August.

In 1993 during the winter he played in Puerto Rico for the Cangrejeros de Santurce and the team won the league championship. They clinched a spot to play in the Caribbean Series representing Puerto Rico and went on to win the series. Villanueva played first base and had the honor of being named the MVP. In 1994 Héctor moved to Mexico where he played for the Tigres of Mexico City. He led the league in home runs and RBIs with a batting average of.333. He later signed a contract that year to play for the Expos on a minor league triple-A team for the Ottawa Lynx. Villanueva was never called up to the Majors so in 1996 he went back to play in the Mexican league. This time he played for the team in Monclova, Mexico. He then spent one season during 1997 playing baseball in the Chinese league for the China Times Eagles. He did not have a good experience in China because he was away from his family and had a misunderstanding with the team manager concerning tickets for his family members to visit him and watch him play. He also felt very uncomfortable with the type of gambling that was going on so he ultimately traveled back to play in Mexico again where would move from one ball club to another. After a while, Héctor became tired of the traveling he had to do in Mexico and decided to retire from playing summer baseball there. He took a job back in his hometown where he would be in charge of the baseball parks where he grew up. This meant he could also be with his family and be there for his kids as they grew up. He always played in the Puerto Rican winter league during the Major league offseason when he was a professional and a few years after his time in Mexico. He also managed a few amateur teams in Puerto Rico later on in his career. He finally quit playing baseball altogether after the 2002–2003 season in Puerto Rico. Villanueva was very passionate about the sport and loved to play the game. He was always a popular player among the fan base because of his likable character and easygoing personality. He displayed tremendous strength whenever he connected the ball but struggled as a defensive player. In The Puerto Rican league Héctor achieved 105 home runs, which ties him for third on the league's lifetime list. He also compiled 425 RBIs and a career batting average of .259 in 754 games. He ended up winning a total of three championships in the league.

Like many other baseball players, Villanueva never became a breakthrough star in the Major Leagues but found a fair amount of success playing in the minors and leagues outside of the United States, especially in Mexico. He was a right-handed hefty slugger with a knack to pull the ball down the left field line. Héctor would at times come up with a streak of hits and home runs during clutch moments, but he lacked consistency and this made his professional career in the Major Leagues last for a short amount of time.

== See also ==
- List of Major League Baseball players from Puerto Rico
- List of Puerto Ricans
