= Shawn Boskie =

American baseball player (born 1967)

- Pitcher
- Born: March 28, 1967 (age 58); Hawthorne, Nevada, U.S.
- Batted: Right Threw: Right

MLB debut
- May 20, 1990, for the Chicago Cubs

Last MLB appearance
- July 18, 1998, for the Montreal Expos

MLB statistics
- Win–loss record: 49–63
- Earned run average: 5.14
- Strikeouts: 494
- Stats at Baseball Reference

Teams
- Chicago Cubs (1990–1994); Philadelphia Phillies (1994); Seattle Mariners (1994); California Angels (1995–1996); Baltimore Orioles (1997); Montreal Expos (1998)

Shawn Kealoha Boskie (born March 28, 1967), is an American former professional baseball pitcher, who played in Major League Baseball (MLB) from 1990 to 1998. He was drafted by the Chicago Cubs in the first round, 10th overall, in the 1986 Major League Baseball draft.

== Early life ==
Boskie attended Reno High School in Reno, Nevada, where he played football and baseball. Both his parents were active bowlers and softball players throughout his childhood. His father, Dietrich Boskie, is of Hawaiian descent and grew up in Hilo, Hawaii. He has been active in the Elks Club where he served as a leader locally, statewide, and nationally. His mother, Cheryl Boskie, has been a member of P.E.O. for 50 years. Boskie played college baseball at Modesto Junior College in Modesto, California.

== Professional career ==
Boskie made his major league debut on May 20, 1990, versus the Houston Astros, pitching a 5-hit complete game, while collecting two hits himself. Overall, his rookie year was quite promising, highlighted by a 3.63 earned run average (ERA), in 15 games started. Boskie's best season was in 1996, with the California Angels, when he achieved career statistical highs in wins (12) and innings pitched (189 1/3). He tied for the league lead in home runs allowed (40), which ranks 12th-most all-time in a single MLB season. Boskie's eight-year big league career also included stints with the Philadelphia Phillies, Seattle Mariners, Baltimore Orioles, and Montreal Expos.

On September 6, 1995, Boskie was the starting pitcher when the Angels played the Orioles on the evening that Cal Ripken Jr. broke Lou Gehrig's consecutive games played streak of 2,130. Ripken hit a home run off Boskie in the 4th inning (Ripken's third game in a row in which he hit a home run).

== Personal life ==
Boskie is a devout Christian. He worked with the non-profit legal advocacy organization Alliance Defending Freedom for 10 years before joining Pure Flix Entertainment as Vice President of Investor Relations. In 2021 he founded Canyon Productions, an independent Christian film company. He married Pamela Russell in 1990 and they reside in Scottsdale, AZ with three children.
