= Kevin Coffman =

American baseball player (born 1965)

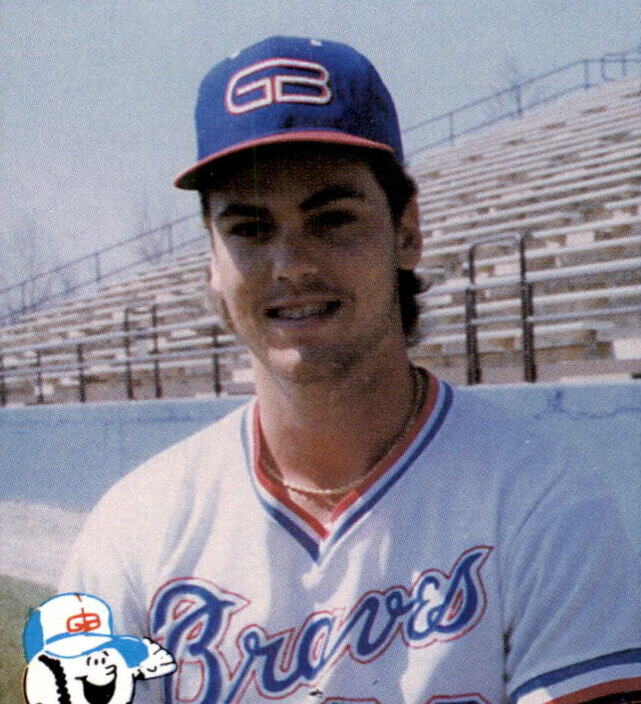
- Coffman with the Greenville Braves c. 1987
- Pitcher
- Born: January 19, 1965 (age 61); Austin, Texas, U.S.
- Batted: Right Threw: Right

MLB debut
- September 5, 1987, for the Atlanta Braves

Last MLB appearance
- October 1, 1990, for the Chicago Cubs

MLB statistics
- Win–loss record: 4–11
- Earned run average: 6.42
- Strikeouts: 47
- Stats at Baseball Reference

Teams
- Atlanta Braves (1987–1988); Chicago Cubs (1990)

Kevin Reese Coffman (born January 19, 1965) is an American former right-handed pitcher in the MLB, where he played three seasons, appearing with the Atlanta Braves from 1987 to 1988, where he went 4–9 with a 5.46 earned run average. He played in MLB again in 1990, this time for the Chicago Cubs where he went 0–2 with an 11.29 earned run average, retiring after the 1995 season having also played in the Houston and Seattle organizations. He compiled a 4-11 record with a 6.42 ERA.
