= Dave Pavlas =

German baseball player (born 1962)

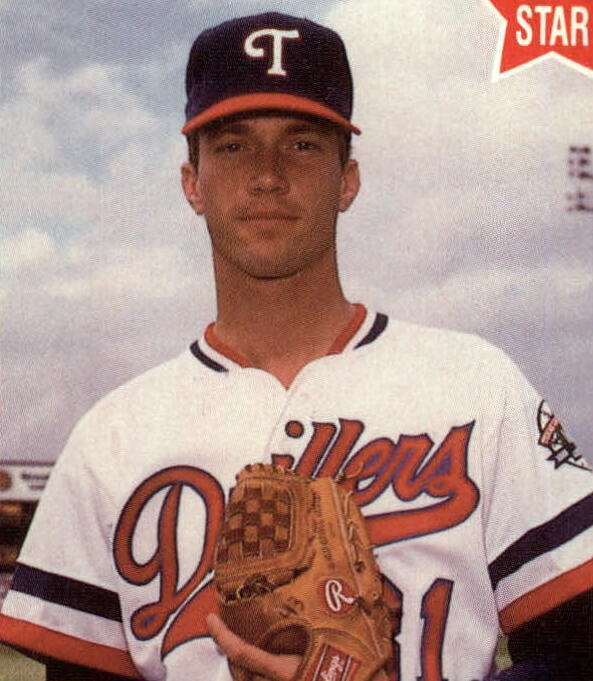
- Pavlas with the Tulsa Drillers c. 1988
- Pitcher
- Born: August 12, 1962 (age 64); Frankfurt, West Germany
- Batted: Right Threw: Right

Professional debut
- MLB: August 21, 1990, for the Chicago Cubs
- CPBL: September 11, 1993, for the Brother Elephants
- NPB: June 10, 1997, for the Yomiuri Giants

Last appearance
- MLB: September 29, 1996, for the New York Yankees
- NPB: June 29, 1997, for the Yomiuri Giants
- CPBL: October 24, 1998, for the Brother Elephants

MLB statistics
- Win–loss record: 2–0
- Earned run average: 2.65
- Strikeouts: 33

CPBL statistics
- Win–loss record: 4–2
- Earned run average: 2.48
- Strikeouts: 28

NPB statistics
- Win–loss record: 0–0
- Earned run average: 6.00
- Strikeouts: 4
- Stats at Baseball Reference

Teams
- Chicago Cubs (1990–1991); Brother Elephants (1993); New York Yankees (1995–1996); Yomiuri Giants (1997); Brother Elephants (1998)

Career highlights and awards
- Taiwan Series champion (1993)

David Lee Pavlas (born August 12, 1962) is a German former baseball pitcher who was born in Frankfurt, West Germany. He attended Rice University.

== Career ==
Pavlas was a 6'7", 180-pound pitcher. He was signed by the Chicago Cubs as an amateur free agent in 1984. A right-handed pitcher, he did exceptionally well in his first professional season, going 8–3 with a 2.62 ERA. His success simmered after the first pro season, but overall he had an impressive minor league career-impressive enough to be called up by the Cubs at the age of 28. He did well in his first stint in the major leagues, going 2–0 with a 2.11 ERA in 13 games.

Even with that, he found himself in the minors in 1991. He appeared in only one game that year, allowing 2 runs in one inning of work. After playing in the minors for the remainder of the 1992 season, he moved on to the Mexican League. He spent two years there before being signed by the New York Yankees as a replacement player in 1995. In 20 career games as a Yankee, his ERA was below 3.00. After his final game in the majors on September 29, 1996, he pitched in seven games for the Yomiuri Giants in 1997, then bounced around in the minors until 2001 before retiring.
