= Derrick May (baseball) =

American baseball player and coach (born 1968)

- Left fielder / Coach
- Born: July 14, 1968 (age 57); Rochester, New York, U.S.
- Batted: Left Threw: Right

Professional debut
- MLB: September 6, 1990, for the Chicago Cubs
- NPB: March 24, 2001, for the Chiba Lotte Marines

Last appearance
- MLB: October 3, 1999, for the Baltimore Orioles
- NPB: May 6, 2003, for the Chiba Lotte Marines

MLB statistics
- Batting average: .271
- Home runs: 52
- Runs batted in: 310

NPB statistics
- Batting average: .274
- Home runs: 59
- Runs batted in: 200
- Stats at Baseball Reference

Teams
- Chicago Cubs (1990–1994); Milwaukee Brewers (1995); Houston Astros (1995–1996); Philadelphia Phillies (1997); Montreal Expos (1998); Baltimore Orioles (1999); Chiba Lotte Marines (2001–2003)

Derrick Brant May (born July 14, 1968) is an American former professional baseball outfielder and coach. He played in Major League Baseball (MLB) from 1990 to 1999 for the Chicago Cubs, Milwaukee Brewers, Houston Astros, Philadelphia Phillies, Montreal Expos, and Baltimore Orioles. He also played three seasons in Nippon Professional Baseball (NPB), from 2001 until 2003, for the Chiba Lotte Marines.

May was the assistant hitting coach for the St. Louis Cardinals in 2016. He was the manager of the Frederick Keys of the MLB Draft League in 2021. In 2022 he was the Organization Hitting Coordinator for the SSG Landers of the KBO League.

May was the 1993 Delaware Athlete of the Year, a 2014 Delaware Sports Hall of Fame inductee, and a 2015 Delaware Afro-American Hall of Fame inductee. In 2019 he was elected into the Delaware Baseball Hall of Fame at Frawley Stadium.

Derrick May was recently named Director of the Baseball Division for Rise Above Sports Group.

== Playing career ==
May batted left-handed and threw right-handed. After signing to play football and baseball at Virginia Tech, May was drafted by the Chicago Cubs in the first round (#9 overall) of the 1986 Major League Baseball draft, at the age of 17. May hit .320 (3rd), .298 (11th), .305 (5th), .295 (5th), and .296 (5th) and was a Carolina League and Southern League All-Star before making his major league debut. May enjoyed an 18-year professional baseball career, including ten seasons in the major leagues. He was a .271 hitter with 52 home runs and 310 RBI in 797 major league games played. In Japan, he hit an additional 59 home runs in just three seasons, batting .274. May's best season came in 1993, where he logged a: .295 batting average, 10 home runs, 77 runs batted in, 62 runs, 25 doubles, 10 stolen bases, and 128 appearances – all career-highs.

== Coaching career ==
=== St. Louis Cardinals ===
May was an assistant MLB hitting coach/hitting coordinator and minor league hitting coach in the St. Louis Cardinals organization from 2005 to 2016.

- 2005: Coached the Palm Beach Cardinals (High-A) to the Florida State League Championship his first year in 2005.
- 2006: Won both halves and made playoffs in the Florida State League.
- 2007: Promoted to (Double-A) Springfield Cardinals of the Texas League and coached them to the Texas League championship finals. The team led the league in hitting (.271), hits and on-base percentage (.345), and was second in runs scored, home runs, slugging (.431) and on-base plus slugging percentage (.776).
- 2008: Coached Springfield to the second best record in the league. The team batted .275, was first in home runs, and tied for second in hits and total bases.
- 2009: Won the first half in Northern division. Lost in the first round of the playoffs. His team led the league in home runs and tied for second in triples.
- 2010: Was the Springfield hitting coach. The team finished with the second best record in the league at 76–64, and tied for second in batting at .264, first in home runs with 146, second in doubles, runs scored, total bases, walks, on-base percentage, slugging, and on-base plus slugging.
- 2011-2016: St. Louis Cardinals organizational minor league hitting coordinator.
- 2014: Awarded the Organizations George Kissell award for excellence in player development.
- 2016: Named assistant hitting coach for the St. Louis Cardinals after third-base coach Jose Oquendo was placed on medical leave of absence.

=== Colorado Rockies ===
In 2017, May began working for the Colorado Rockies organization as the hitting coach for the Lancaster JetHawks in the California League. Where the team were the first and second half champions of the South Division 79-61. The Jayhawks led the league in hitting, hits and stolen bases.

=== Frederick Keys ===
On April 12, 2021, May was announced as the manager of the Frederick Keys, a collegiate summer baseball team of the MLB Draft League.

=== SSG Landers ===
In January 2022, May was named the Organization Hitting Coordinator for the SSG Landers of the KBO League.

=== Piratas de Campeche ===
In 2025, May served as the hitting coach for the Piratas de Campeche of the Mexican League. May stepped down as hitting coach due to team issues.

== Personal life ==
Derrick May is the son of major league outfielder Dave May. His brother, David May, Jr., is a major league scout for the Toronto Blue Jays. His oldest son Derrick Jr. was a 37th round draft pick in 2012 by the St. Louis Cardinals and another son Donovan is a scout for the Boston Red Sox.

== See also ==
- List of second-generation Major League Baseball players

Cardinal's Derrick May on What it takes to get to the big leagues - Pro Baseball Insider

- List of St. Louis Cardinals coaches
