= Luis Salazar =

Venezuelan baseball player (born 1956)

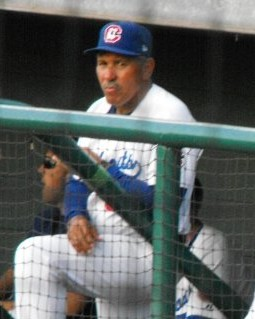
- Salazar as hitting coach of the Chattanooga Lookouts in 2009
- Third baseman
- Born: May 19, 1956 (age 70); Barcelona, Venezuela
- Batted: Right Threw: Right

MLB debut
- August 15, 1980, for the San Diego Padres

Last MLB appearance
- October 4, 1992, for the Chicago Cubs

MLB statistics
- Batting average: .261
- Home runs: 94
- Runs batted in: 455
- Stats at Baseball Reference

Teams
- San Diego Padres (1980–1984); Chicago White Sox (1985–1986); San Diego Padres (1987); Detroit Tigers (1988); San Diego Padres (1989); Chicago Cubs (1989–1992)

Member of the Venezuelan

Baseball Hall of Fame
- Induction: 2011

Luis Ernesto Salazar García (born May 19, 1956) is a Venezuelan former professional baseball player, coach and manager. He played in Major League Baseball from 1980 to 1992 as a third baseman and outfielder for the San Diego Padres (1980–84, 1987, 1989), Chicago White Sox (1985–86), Detroit Tigers (1988), and the Chicago Cubs (1989–92).

== Baseball career ==
In 1973, he signed with the Kansas City Royals but was released in 1974. He signed with the Pittsburgh Pirates in 1975. On August 5, 1980, Salazar, along with Rick Lancellotti, was traded to the San Diego Padres for a player to be named later and Kurt Bevacqua. The Padres later sent Mark Lee to Pittsburgh to complete the trade. After seven minors seasons, finally, he got a chance with San Diego in the 1980 season.

An extremely versatile reserve who played every position but catcher in his career, Salazar was the Padres' third baseman between 1981 and 1983. In 1984, they acquired 39-year-old Graig Nettles, who platooned with Salazar at third base. The Padres won the National League pennant, before losing the World Series in five games to the Detroit Tigers. Salazar was traded to the White Sox along with Ozzie Guillén (1985), and returned to the Padres as a free agent (1987). Then, he signed with Detroit (1988), before being dealt back to San Diego. Salazar finished his career with the Cubs.

In his first stint with the Padres, Salazar hit 29 home runs with 187 runs batted in and 109 stolen bases in 525 games. In 126 games with the White Sox, he played on third base, first base, shortstop and outfield (eventually was DH and relief pitcher), batting .245 with 10 homers and 45 RBI. For Detroit, mostly in the outfield, he hit .270, 12, 62. Also, he kept the Tigers in a pennant race by filling in at shortstop for injured Alan Trammell.

On August 31, 1989, a few minutes before the postseason rosters had to be filed, the Cubs obtained Salazar from San Diego in a last effort to replace their four slumping third basemen. Salazar gave the club a lift in September, playing a solid third base and batting .325 (26-80) with 12 RBI and a .357 on-base percentage. The Cubs won the National League East division title. The next three seasons Salazar played predominantly on third base, batting .243 with 31 homers, 110 RBI, and 78 runs in 316 games.

In a 1,302-game career, Salazar batted .261 with 179 home runs, 653 RBI, 438 runs scored, 1070 hits, 144 doubles, 33 triples and 117 stolen bases. Salazar was also a valuable pinch-hitter in his career. He went 28-for-91 for a .308 of batting average, with four home runs and 17 runs batted in.

He has served as a hitting coach with the Louisville RiverBats (1999), Indianapolis Indians (2000), Milwaukee Brewers, Jacksonville Suns (2008) and Chattanooga Lookouts (2009).

Salazar was inducted into the Hispanic Heritage Baseball Museum Hall of Fame in 2010.

Salazar joined the Atlanta Braves organization in 2011 and was poised to serve as the manager of their Class A-Advanced minor league affiliate, the Lynchburg Hillcats of the Carolina League. On March 9, 2011, he was struck in the face by a foul ball hit by Braves catcher Brian McCann during a spring training game between the Braves and the St. Louis Cardinals. He was airlifted to a local hospital to undergo surgery. Salazar had his left eye removed on March 15, 2011, due to the injuries he sustained from the incident. After the injury, Salazar stated that he intended to continue working for the Braves organization, and he was expected to return to manage the Hillcats once medically cleared to return to work. Salazar returned to the Hillcats dugout on April 15, 2011.

Salazar was named manager for the A advanced Florida Fire Frogs in the Atlanta Braves organization for the 2018 season.

== See also ==
- List of players from Venezuela in Major League Baseball
