= Shawon Dunston =

American baseball player (born 1963)

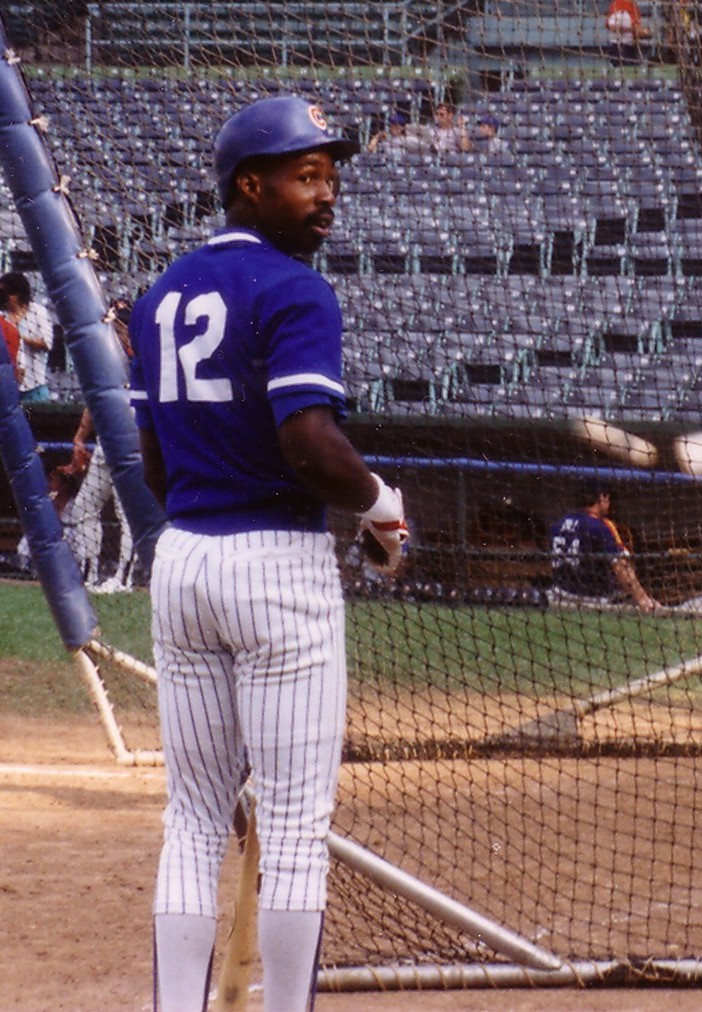
- Dunston with the Chicago Cubs in 1988
- Shortstop
- Born: March 21, 1963 (age 63); Brooklyn, New York, U.S.
- Batted: Right Threw: Right

MLB debut
- April 9, 1985, for the Chicago Cubs

Last MLB appearance
- September 29, 2002, for the San Francisco Giants

MLB statistics
- Batting average: .269
- Home runs: 150
- Runs batted in: 668
- Stats at Baseball Reference

Teams
- Chicago Cubs (1985–1995); San Francisco Giants (1996); Chicago Cubs (1997); Pittsburgh Pirates (1997); Cleveland Indians (1998); San Francisco Giants (1998); St. Louis Cardinals (1999); New York Mets (1999); St. Louis Cardinals (2000); San Francisco Giants (2001–2002)

Career highlights and awards
- 2× All-Star (1988, 1990); Chicago Cubs Hall of Fame

Shawon Donnell Dunston (born March 21, 1963) is an American former professional baseball player. A shortstop, Dunston played in Major League Baseball (MLB) from 1985 through 2002. On January 13, 2023, he was selected as a member of the 2023 class of the Chicago Cubs Hall of Fame.

Dunston was the first overall pick in the 1982 MLB draft by the Chicago Cubs, and played for the Cubs (1985–95, 1997), San Francisco Giants (1996, 1998, 2001–02), Pittsburgh Pirates (1997), Cleveland Indians (1998), St. Louis Cardinals (1999, 2000) and New York Mets (1999). Dunston was named an All-Star in 1988 and 1990.

== Early life ==
Dunston was born in the East New York section of Brooklyn, New York City, on March 21, 1963. As a youth, he lived in the Linden Apartments, a public housing facility, with his father, Jack, mother, Brenda, and younger sister, Kindra. Jack worked as a cab driver and delivered furniture, while Brenda worked in a women's clothing store.

Dunston attended the nearby Thomas Jefferson High School. He played for the school's baseball team as an infielder. In his senior season at Thomas Jefferson, Dunston had a .790 batting average, 10 home runs, and stole 37 bases without being caught stealing in 26 games.

== Playing career ==
As a shortstop, Dunston was considered one of the best prospects available in the 1982 Major League Baseball draft. The Chicago Cubs selected Dunston with the first overall selection of the draft out of Thomas Jefferson High School. He was the first player from the New York area to be chosen with the first overall pick in the draft. Opting to represent himself, Dunston signed a one-year contract with the Cubs for $100,000, and was assigned to the Cubs' Rookie-level minor league baseball affiliate in the Gulf Coast League.

Dunston competed with Larry Bowa for the role as the starting shortstop for the Cubs in spring training in 1985. Dunston initially won the job over Bowa. He made his debut in the major leagues on April 9. However, Dunston struggled offensively and defensively, batting .194 and committing nine errors in 23 games. As a result, he was sent back to the minor leagues, with Bowa regaining the starting role. After playing well for the Iowa Cubs, the Cubs recalled Dunston in August, and released Bowa.

In 1988 and 1990 he joined double-play partner Ryne Sandberg as an All-Star and was a key contributor to the Cubs' NL East division title in 1989, hitting .278 with 20 doubles, 6 triples, 9 home runs, 60 runs batted in and 19 stolen bases. Due to become a free agent after the 1991 season, Dunston instead signed a four-year, $12 million contract to remain with the Cubs without testing the open market. However, he injured his back that offseason, and required surgery to repair a herniated disk in May 1992. The Cubs opted not to protect Dunston from being eligible to be selected in the 1992 Major League Baseball expansion draft, but neither the Colorado Rockies nor the Florida Marlins selected him.

After the 1995 season, he was granted free agency. The Cubs wanted to move Dunston to third base, but he preferred to remain at shortstop. As a result, he signed with the San Francisco Giants for the 1996 season, receiving a one-year contract worth $1.5 million. He signed with the Cubs for the 1997 season, receiving $2 million.

On August 31, 1997, the Cubs traded Dunston to the Pittsburgh Pirates, who lost two shortstops, Kevin Elster and Kevin Polcovich, to injuries. He hit two home runs in his first game with the Pirates, and three in his first three games. He became a free agent after the season, and signed a one-year contract with the Cleveland Indians for $400,000. On July 23, 1998, the Indians traded Dunston, José Mesa, and Alvin Morman to the Giants for Jacob Cruz and Steve Reed. Dunston was batting .237 at the time of the trade. With the Giants, Dunston batted .176 in 51 at-bats. Dunston became a free agent after the season and signed with the St. Louis Cardinals on a one-year contract worth $500,000.

On July 31, 1999, the Cardinals traded Dunston to the New York Mets for Craig Paquette. He replaced rookie Melvin Mora on the Mets roster. Dunston became a free agent after the season and signed with the Cardinals for the 2000 season. He signed with the Giants that next offseason, playing with them in 2001 and 2002. He reached the 2002 World Series, his first, as a member of the Giants. In his final major league appearance, he hit a home run off Kevin Appier of the Anaheim Angels in Game Six to give his team a two run lead in what could have been a championship-clinching game for the Giants, but the Angels came back to win the game and eventually the series.

Dunston was a career .269 hitter with 150 home runs and 668 RBI in 1814 games. He seldom walked, so in spite of his batting average, his on-base percentage was the second-worst among players with at least 4500 plate appearances during their careers. At the end of his career, he was used mainly as a fourth outfielder and a role player off the bench. He wore jersey #12 while with the Chicago Cubs.

== Playing style ==
Bill James noted that Dunston was an "eternal rookie, a player who continued until the end of his career to make rookie mistakes." Dunston was known, especially early in his career, for his unusually strong throwing arm at the shortstop position.

He won the 1996 Willie Mac Award for his spirit and leadership.

== Post-playing career ==
Dunston became eligible for the National Baseball Hall of Fame in 2008; 75% of the vote was necessary for induction, and 5% was necessary to stay on the ballot. He received 0.2% of the vote, thus being dropped off the Baseball Writers' Association of America's ballot.

During his career, Dunston resided in Fremont, California.

== Personal ==
Dunston has a son, Shawon Jr., who has played minor league baseball. One of Dunston's three daughters, Jasmine Dunston, became the White Sox Director of Minor League Operations in 2022.

== See also ==
- List of Major League Baseball career stolen bases leaders

Awards and achievements
Preceded by Mike Moore	First overall pick in the MLB Entry Draft; 1982	Succeeded by Tim Belcher
