= Randy Kramer =

American baseball player (born 1960)

- Pitcher
- Born: September 20, 1960 (age 66); Palo Alto, California, U.S.
- Batted: Left Threw: Right

MLB debut
- September 11, 1988, for the Pittsburgh Pirates

Last MLB appearance
- June 23, 1992, for the Seattle Mariners

MLB statistics
- Win–loss record: 6–15
- Earned run average: 4.51
- Strikeouts: 92
- Stats at Baseball Reference

Teams
- Pittsburgh Pirates (1988–1990); Chicago Cubs (1990); Seattle Mariners (1992)

Randall John Kramer (born September 20, 1960) is an American former professional baseball pitcher, coach, and scout. He pitched in parts of four seasons in Major League Baseball (MLB) between 1988 and 1992 for the Pittsburgh Pirates, Chicago Cubs, and Seattle Mariners.

Kramer attended Oak Grove High School in San Jose, California. He was high school baseball teammates with future MLB players Dave Stieb and Mike Brown. The San Diego Padres drafted Kramer in the 26th round of the 1978 MLB draft, but he did not sign. He then attended San Jose City College. The Houston Astros drafted him in the January phase of the 1982 MLB draft, but he again did not sign to play professionally. He was the Golden Gate Conference Pitcher of the Year in 1982. The Texas Rangers then selected him in the first round of the June secondary phase of the 1982 draft, and he signed. He pitched in the Rangers minor league system through 1986, then Texas traded him to the Pirates for pitcher Jeff Zaske on September 30.

After leading the American Association in innings pitched in 1988, Kramer made his MLB debut with Pittsburgh on September 11, going 1–2 with a 5.40 earned run average (ERA) as a September call-up. He started the 1989 season in the minors, returning to the majors on April 21. He pitched a career-high 111 1/3 innings in his rookie season, with a 5–9 record, 2 saves, and 3.96 ERA.

Pittsburgh traded Kramer to the Cubs on September 1, 1990. He pitched in 10 games for Chicago, which released him after the season. He signed with the Atlanta Braves in January 1991 but was released in June, quickly latching on with the Mariners, though he did not pitch in the majors that season. He returned to the majors for part of June 1992, starting four games for Seattle, which released him after the season.

Kramer pitched in Triple-A in 1993 and 1994, also pitching twice in 1994 for the China Times Eagles of the Chinese Professional Baseball League.

After his playing career, Kramer was a minor league pitching coach from 1998 to 2002. He was an assistant coach at Cabrillo College in 2005 and later a scout for the Toronto Blue Jays.

Kramer is married.
