= Yorkis Pérez =

Dominican baseball player (born 1967)

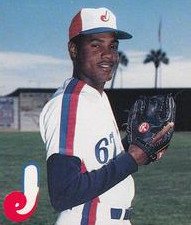
- Pérez in 1988
- Pitcher
- Born: September 30, 1967 (age 58); Bajos de Haina, Dominican Republic
- Batted: Left Threw: Left

MLB debut
- September 30, 1991, for the Chicago Cubs

Last MLB appearance
- September 10, 2002, for the Baltimore Orioles

MLB statistics
- Win–loss record: 14–15
- Earned run average: 4.44
- Strikeouts: 259
- Stats at Baseball Reference

Teams
- Chicago Cubs (1991); Yomiuri Giants (1992); Florida Marlins (1994–1996); New York Mets (1997); Philadelphia Phillies (1998–1999); Houston Astros (2000); Baltimore Orioles (2002)

Yorkis Miguel Vargas Pérez (born September 30, 1967) is a Dominican former Major League Baseball (MLB) pitcher. The left-hander appeared in 337 games over nine seasons for the Chicago Cubs, Florida Marlins, New York Mets, Philadelphia Phillies, Houston Astros and Baltimore Orioles, all as a relief pitcher. He also pitched three games in 1992 for the Yomiuri Giants.

== Career ==
He signed a minor league deal with Baltimore just before the start of the 2002 season after he was released by the Arizona Diamondbacks during the last week of spring training. After spending almost the entire first half of the campaign with the Rochester Red Wings, his contract was purchased by the Orioles on June 25. He went 0–0 with one save and a 3.29 earned run average (ERA) in 23 appearances before an appendectomy on September 12 ended his season. He was released nineteen days later on October 1.

== Personal life ==
Yorkis has three cousins (all brothers) that have played in the major leagues: Melido Pérez, Pascual Pérez, and Carlos Pérez. His son, Leurys Vargas, was a member of the Seattle Mariners organization from 2012-2015.
