= Baseball at the 1984 Summer Olympics – Team squads =

Below are the team rosters for the baseball tournament at the 1984 Summer Olympics.

== White Division ==
=== Chinese Taipei ===
- George Chao, DH/1B
- Chiang Tai-Chuan, DH
- Chuang Sheng-Hsiung, P
- Kuo Tai-Yuan, P
- Lee Chu-Ming, CF
- Lu Wen-sheng, 2B
- Li Chih-Chun, LF
- Lin Hua-Wei, 3B
- Lin I-Tseng, RF
- Liu Chiu-Lung, P
- Sung Yung-Tai, 1B/LF/CF
- Tsai Sen-Fong, RF
- Tseng Chih-chen, C
- Tu Fu-Ming, P
- Tu Hung-Chin, P
- Twu Jong-Nan, C
- Wu Fu-Lien, SS
- Wu Te-Shen, 3B/SS
- Yang Ching-Long, 1B
- Yeh Chih-Shien, 2B

=== Dominican Republic ===
- Rafael Almonte, P
- Horacio Bauza, SS
- Nelson Cespedes, P
- Ivan Crispin, SS
- Nicholas Domitilo, P
- Jose Florentino, P
- Junio Gelbal, C
- Pedro Gomez, 1B
- Victor Gomez, P
- Orlando Guerreo, 2B
- Secundino Lora, P
- Ramón Martínez, P
- Miguel Mota, LF
- Jony Olivo, P
- Hector Paniagua, RF
- Francisco Pans, 2B
- Bernardo Reyes, CF
- Antonio Sanchez, DH
- Abad Santana, C
- Aristides Taveras, 3B

=== Italy ===
- Ruggero Bagialemani, 2B
- Roberto Bianchi, DH
- Giuseppe Carelli, RF
- Paolo Ceccaroli, P
- David Chiono, P
- Louis Colabello, P
- Giovanni Costa, 3B
- Keith D'Amato, P
- David DeMarco, 1B
- David Farina, P
- Massimo Fochi, P
- Paolo Gagliano, 2B/CF
- John Guggiana, 3B
- Anthony Lo Nero, C
- Roberto Man, P
- Stefano Manzini, LF
- Mike Romano, SS
- Mark Talarico, CF/LF
- Guglielmo Trinci, 1B/LF
- Bob Turcio, DH/P

=== United States ===
- Sid Akins, P
- Flavio Alfaro, SS
- Don August, P
- Scott Bankhead, P
- Bob Caffrey, DH/C
- Will Clark, DH/LF
- Mike Dunne, P
- Gary Green, SS
- Chris Gwynn, RF
- John Hoover, P
- Barry Larkin, 2B/DH/LF
- Shane Mack, LF/RF
- John Marzano, C
- Oddibe McDowell, CF
- Mark McGwire, 1B
- Pat Pacillo, P
- Cory Snyder, 3B
- B. J. Surhoff, C
- Bill Swift, P
- Bobby Witt, P

== Blue Division ==
=== Canada ===
- Henry Andrulis, DH
- Michael Carnegie, P
- Larry Downes, 1B
- Mike Gardiner, P
- Joe Heeney, DH
- Rod Heisler, P
- John Ivan, 3B
- Barry Kuzminski, P
- Simon Legault, C
- Scott Mann, RF
- Scott Maxwell, LF
- Bob McCullough, SS
- Doug McPhail, CF
- Tom Nelson, 2B
- Alain Patenaude, P
- Steve Ridley, SS
- Brad Susko, P
- Rob Thomson, C
- Steve Wilson, P
- Mark Wooden, P

=== Japan ===
- Yukio Arai, RF
- Katsuyuki Fukumoto, 1B
- Shinichi Furukawa, LF
- Shinji Hata, DH/C
- Katsumi Hirosawa, DH/1B
- Akimitsu Ito, P
- Atsunori Ito, P
- Terumitsu Kumano, CF
- Kazutomo Miyamoto, P
- Noboru Morita, LF
- Yoshihiko Morita, SS
- Yoshiaki Nishikawa, P
- Munehiko Shimada, C
- Kozo Shoda, 2B
- Kazuaki Ueda, DH/3B
- Yasushi Urahigashi, 3B
- Yutaka Wada, 1B/2B/DH
- Akira Yonemura, P
- Yasuo Yoshida, C
- Yukio Yoshida, P

=== Korea ===
- Ahn Un-Hak, 1B/SS/3B
- Baek In-Ho, SS
- Choy Kai-Young, DH/LF/RF
- Han Hee-Min, P
- Kang Ki-Woong, 2B
- Kim Hyoung-Suk, 1B
- Kim Yong-Kuk, 3B
- Kim Yong-soo, P
- Kim Young-Sin, C
- Lee Jong-Doo, RF/DH
- Lee Kang-Don, DH/RF
- Lee Sang-Kun, P
- Lee Soon Chul, LF/CF
- Oh Myong-Lok, P
- Park Heung-Sik, CF
- Park Noh-Jun, P/DH
- Sun Dong-Ryeul, P
- Yoo Joong-Il, SS
- Yoon Hak-Kil, P

=== Nicaragua ===
- Luis Arauz, P
- Leonardo Cardenas, CF/RF
- Juan Centeno, P
- Cesar Chavarria, C
- Francisco Cruz, P
- José Cruz, RF/CF
- Ariel Delgado, 3B
- Roberto Espino, 1B
- Julio Espinoza, P
- Fabio Garcia, CF
- Juan Garmendez, DH
- Jose Guzman, C
- Julio Medina, 2B
- Jaime Miranda, RF
- Julio Moya, P
- Arnoldo Munoz, SS
- Diego Raudez, P
- Julio Sanchez, 1B/DH
- Richard Taylor, LF
- Gerald Watson, P
