= Flavio Alfaro =

American baseball player (1961–2021)

Medal record

Representing United States

Men's baseball

Summer Olympics
Silver medal – second place	1984 Los Angeles	Team

Flavio Roman Alfaro (October 26, 1961 – January 27, 2021) was an American baseball shortstop and second baseman who played one season of Minor League Baseball. He was noted for being a member of the 1984 United States Olympic baseball team that won silver.

== Early life ==
Alfaro was born in Los Angeles on October 26, 1961. He attended Poly High School in Sun Valley, California, where he played on the school's baseball team. He went on to study at the College of the Canyons from 1981 to 1982. In his two seasons there, he finished with batting averages of .361 and .369, respectively, and was well-regarded for his defensive play. He later transferred to San Diego State University, where he played for the San Diego State Aztecs baseball team under Jim Dietz in 1983 and 1984. There, he batted .387 with 11 home runs, 14 doubles, and 52 runs batted in (RBI).

== Professional career ==
=== 1984 Olympics ===
While playing for the Aztecs, Alfaro was selected for the United States national baseball team to compete at the 1984 Summer Olympics. He ended up playing alongside future well known Major League Baseball players such as Mark McGwire, Barry Larkin, Will Clark, Cory Snyder, Bobby Witt, Oddibe McDowell, Shane Mack, Gary Green, and Bill Swift, among others. In the team's opening game against Chinese Taipei, Alfaro reached base via an error, and came around to score the game-winning run in the seventh inning of a 2–1 win. He proceeded to drive in one run on an infield hit in the second game, a 16–1 blowout win against Italy. He scored on a home run by McDowell in the semifinals against South Korea. The team ultimately advanced to the final, where they lost 6–3 to Japan. In that game, Alfaro's delay in covering second base on a pickoff attempt led to Kozo Shoda stealing third and eventually scoring.

=== Minor leagues ===
Alfaro was subsequently drafted by the Atlanta Braves in the 4th round of the 1984 Major League Baseball draft. He would go on to play only one season in the minor leagues with the Class-A Durham Bulls of the Carolina League. He batted .193 with 3 home runs, 34 RBIs and 29 stolen bases in 110 games for the team, and played predominantly at second base. He was traded to the Milwaukee Brewers in March 1986, just prior to start of the season, in a trade involving major leaguers Rick Cerone and Ted Simmons. However, he retired after a back injury and a contract dispute with Brewers management over which level in the minor leagues he would play. He was the first player from the 1984 Olympic team to retire from professional baseball. He would later concede that his inability to adjust to wooden bats led to his early retirement in professional baseball. [14] In the 1980s the NCAAs exclusively used aluminum bats for financial reasons, and it wasn't uncommon for some of the brightest college baseball stars to struggle with wood bats they would be required to use once they started playing professional baseball.

== Later life ==
After retiring from baseball, he moved to Sacramento, California, and became a chestnut farmer.

Alfaro died on January 27, 2021. He was 59, and suffered from pancreatic cancer in the time leading up to his death.
