= Bash Brothers =

Duo of baseball teammates Mark McGwire and Jose Canseco

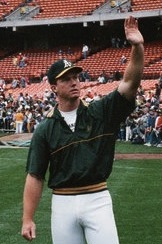
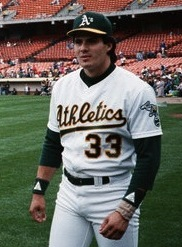
Mark McGwire (left) and Jose Canseco (right) were named Rookie of the Year in consecutive years.

The Bash Brothers are a duo of former baseball players consisting of Jose Canseco and Mark McGwire. Both prolific home run hitters, the two were teammates in Major League Baseball (MLB) for seven seasons with the Oakland Athletics, helping the team win a World Series title in 1989.

The two began celebrating homers by bashing each other's forearms, which spawned a marketing campaign that was a takeoff on The Blues Brothers. After retiring from playing, Canseco and McGwire both admitted to using anabolic steroids during their careers.

== Background ==
Canseco was drafted by the Oakland A's in the 15th round of the 1982 MLB draft. He did not become a legitimate power hitter until he began weightlifting in late 1984 and gained 35 pounds (16 kg) of muscle. In 1985 he jumped from AA to AAA to the major leagues, and batted .300 at each level. In 29 games with Oakland that season, he batted .302 with five home runs (HR) and 13 runs batted in (RBI), and hit a combined 41 home runs with 140 RBI at all levels that year.

McGwire played college baseball for the USC Trojans, and set a school record with 32 home runs in his junior year. He played for the United States national team in the 1984 Summer Olympics before being selected by the A's in the first round of the 1984 draft. In two-plus years in the minor leagues, McGwire hit 48 home runs. He debuted with the A's as a third baseman in August 1986.

== Oakland A's ==
The outfielder Canseco was named the American League (AL) Rookie of the Year in 1986 when he hit 33 homers, and McGwire captured the award the following season, when he was moved to first base and hit a league-leading 49 home runs, a major-league record for rookies. The two combined for over 200 home runs as Oakland captured the AL pennant in three consecutive seasons from 1988 through 1990, winning the World Series in 1989. In 1988, Canseco was unanimously voted the AL Most Valuable Player after batting .307 and leading the majors with 42 home runs and 124 RBI. He also added 40 stolen bases (SB), which combined with his home run total made him the first major leaguer to ever reach the 40–40 club. Starting with spring training that year, Canseco and McGwire began a ritual of meeting at home plate and banging their massive forearms together with closed fists to briefly form an "X" when either of them hit a home run. Dubbed the Monster Bash, it soon replaced the customary high five as the team's preferred post-homer celebration. The practice was mimicked by Little Leaguers, college players, and minor leaguers. It was also performed by the United States national team at the 1988 Summer Olympics in South Korea.

At the Oakland Coliseum, T-shirts and banners bore "Let's Bash". The A's marketing department teamed with local San Jose television station KICU-TV to make a song and complementary music video to the tune of "Monster Mash", the 1962 hit by Bobby "Boris" Pickett. The "Monster Bash" video debuted on the Coliseum’s large Mitsubishi DiamondVision during the A's homestand against the Chicago White Sox on April 15–17, but was temporarily shelved after Oakland was swept in the three-game series. However, the A's released the song to local radio stations, and it ended up on the playlists of almost a dozen of them, whose formats varied from top 40, oldies, new age, and even news/talk. The video later returned to the stadium as well.

Poster for "The Bash Brothers" was a takeoff from The Blues Brothers

Costacos Brothers Inc., a poster company, had already planned a photo shoot with the slugging duo for a concept that was originally titled the "Blast Brothers", but the advent of the forearm bashing motivated a change to the "Bash Brothers". While the industry standard at the time was to show action shots of athletes, Costacos Brothers gave their subjects amusing personas matched with catchy slogans. The Bash Brothers poster was patterned after characters popularized by comedians Dan Aykroyd and John Belushi. Canseco and McGwire were made to look like a bigger and meaner version of The Blues Brothers who were also partial to some yellow in their attire—yellow being an A's team color along with green. Wearing black suits, black shoes, black hats, black sunglasses, yellow socks, yellow shirts, green skinny ties, and fedora hats, the duo posed in front of an Oakland Police patrol car while holding giant 5-foot (1.5 m) baseball bats. The poster sold 50,000 copies in the San Francisco Bay Area in less than three weeks. It was as popular as any poster that Costacos had done, and it received immense press coverage.

Due to the frequency and distance of their home runs, the Bash Brothers were a popular attraction in every American League city. McGwire became the first player in major league history to hit 30 home runs in each of his first four seasons (1987–1990), and Canseco led the majors in homers for the second time with 44 in 1991. However, the Athletics finished in fourth place in the AL West in 1991 after having made three straight trips to the World Series. At the trade deadline in 1992, Oakland traded Canseco to the Texas Rangers for outfielder Rubén Sierra, relief pitcher Jeff Russell, and starting pitcher Bobby Witt. The A's at the time were 27 games above .500 and leading their division by 7 1/2 games, but they had played 34 of 131 games without Canseco, and were seeking to strengthen their pitching. He had homered 231 times with the A's since 1985, and was arguably the biggest celebrity in baseball at the time. However, Canseco had played over 135 games in a season just once since 1988, and his off-the-field antics had drawn criticism as well.

After parts of three seasons with Texas and two full seasons with Boston, Canseco returned to Oakland in 1997. The A's had been languishing for three seasons with a combined 196–224 record, and were having a nondescript offseason before acquiring him for pitcher John Wasdin. Reuniting him with McGwire, who together were once one of the most explosive tandems in baseball, boosted the team's ticket sales considerably. McGwire was coming off of a majors-leading 52-homer season, and Canseco remained a threat with his tremendous bat speed. However, McGwire's contract was expiring at the end of the season, and he was traded mid-season to the St. Louis Cardinals for pitchers T. J. Mathews, Eric Ludwick, and Blake Stein. Canseco's season was just ordinary, and he signed in the offseason with the Toronto Blue Jays, his fourth team in four years. During their careers with Oakland, Canseco and McGwire combined to hit 617 home runs.

== Aftermath ==
With Toronto in 1998, Canseco played in 120 games for the first time since 1991, and reached 100 RBI for the first time since 1991. In his last big season, he had 46 home runs, 107 RBI, and 29 stolen bases for the Blue Jays. He became a journeyman designated hitter before retiring in 2002. He fell 38 home runs short of joining the 500 home run club, a milestone he had hoped to reach to bolster his chances of being inducted into the National Baseball Hall of Fame and Museum. Unable to find a job to prolong his career, he accused teams of blackballing him.

McGwire hit 70 home runs in 1998 to break Roger Maris' long-standing major-league record of 61. It was the highlight of a four-year stretch from 1996 though 1999 in which McGwire hit 245 homers. He finished his career with 583 home runs, and averaged one homer every 10.6 at-bats in his career for the best at bats per home run ratio in major league history. He was considered a likely inductee into the Hall of Fame until allegations of his illegal use of steroids.

== Performance-enhancing drugs ==
On September 28, 1988, sports columnist Thomas Boswell of The Washington Post appeared as a guest on CBS News Nightwatch and alleged that Canseco, who was on his way to winning the MVP award that season, was "the most conspicuous example of a player who has made himself great with steroids.” Boswell did not print the allegations in the paper. According to George Solomon, who was the Post's sports editor, the newspaper required 100 percent certainty in what it published. "What Boswell said on CBS was Boswell’s opinion,” Solomon said. In October against Boston during the 1988 American League Championship Series, Red Sox fans at Fenway Park loudly chanted "Ster-roids! Ster-roids!" when Canseco was on the field. He denied the charges, and steroids at the time were not covered in the federal government's Controlled Substances Act.

During his home run record chase in 1998, McGwire was spotted with a bottle of androstenedione in his locker by Steve Wilstein of the Associated Press, which he eventually admitted to using. An over-the-counter bodybuilding substance, andro was a type of anabolic steroid that had been banned in other sports, but not yet in baseball. “Everybody that I know in the game of baseball uses the same stuff I use,” McGwire said. After setting the home run record, he announced that he had stopped using the substance to avoid setting a bad example to young kids. Meanwhile, the locker discovery was written off by the public as the work of a prying reporter.

In 2005, Canseco admitted to using steroids in his book Juiced: Wild Times, Rampant 'Roids, Smash Hits & How Baseball Got Big, which stated that he and McGwire injected steroids together while with Oakland. The book also accused other prominent players of using steroids. McGwire initially denied the allegations, before refusing to comment on steroids during a congressional hearing the following month. In 2010, he too admitted to using steroids. Canseco expressed regret in writing his book and apologized to McGwire in 2014, but his former teammate has spurned multiple attempts at reconciliation until 2025, when they finally reconciled prior to the 2025 Athletics Hall of Fame ceremony in Sacramento.

== Cultural references ==
In May 2019, the comedy group The Lonely Island imagined the Bash Brothers as rappers from their pre-World Series winning season of 1988 in a visual album entitled The Unauthorized Bash Brothers Experience. Its release was timed with the 30th anniversary of the A's 1989 championship season. Canseco said that he "loved" the video and could not "stop laughing." In their first home game after its release, the A's tweeted at The Lonely Island about The Unauthorized Bash Brothers Experience and played one of its tracks, "Oakland Nights", at the Coliseum.

The naming of the NBA's Splash Brothers was directly influenced by the Bash Brothers
