= John Hoover (baseball) =

American baseball player (1962-2014)

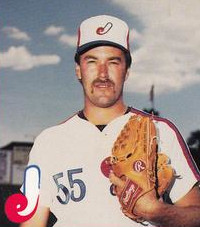
- Hoover in 1988
- Pitcher
- Born: December 22, 1962; Fresno, California, U.S.
- Died: July 8, 2014 (aged 51); Fresno, California, U.S.
- Batted: Right Threw: Right

MLB debut
- May 23, 1990, for the Texas Rangers

Last MLB appearance
- May 25, 1990, for the Texas Rangers

MLB statistics
- Win–loss record: 0–0
- Earned run average: 11.57
- Innings pitched: 4.2
- Stats at Baseball Reference

Teams
- Texas Rangers (1990)
Medals
Men's baseball
Representing United States
Olympics
Silver medal – second place	1984 Los Angeles	Team
Pan American Games
Bronze medal – third place	1983 Caracas	Team

John Nicklaus Hoover (December 22, 1962 – July 8, 2014) was an American Major League Baseball pitcher. He was the No. 25 draft choice in the first round in 1984 (by the Baltimore Orioles), after having led the nation in strikeouts in college baseball, pitching 205 strikeouts for Fresno State in his senior year. Also in 1984 Hoover was a starting pitcher for the United States Olympic baseball team, winning the opening game and helping the US to win the silver medal for baseball. His teammates on the Olympic team included Mark McGwire, Barry Larkin, Will Clark, and Oddibe McDowell.

In 1983, Hoover pitched the opening game at the IX Pan American Games, for an 8-0 victory over the Dominican Republic, helping to win the bronze medal for the United States team.

Hoover signed with the Orioles while still at the Summer Olympics on August 3, 1984. He played for the Texas Rangers in the 1990 season, but had a shortened pro-baseball career due to injuries sustained as a college player. He died on July 8, 2014, apparently of natural causes.

Prior to attending Fresno State, he attended Fresno High School, graduating in 1980 and Cooper Junior High School in Fresno, graduating in 1977.
