= Arimitsu =

Arimitsu (written: 有光) is a Japanese surname. Notable people with the surname include:

- Ryota Arimitsu (有光 亮太, born 1981), Japanese footballer
- Yosuke Arimitsu (有光 洋右, born 1943), Japanese diver

== See also ==
- Akimitsu
