= Sid Akins =

American baseball player

- Pitcher
- Born: November 14, 1962 (age 63); Tyndall Air Force Base, Florida, U.S.
- Bats: Right Throws: Left
- Stats at Baseball Reference
Medals
Baseball
Representing the United States
Olympic Games
Silver medal – second place	1984 Los Angeles	Team

Sidney Wayne Akins (born November 14, 1962) is an American former professional baseball pitcher.

== Career ==
Akins attended Cleveland High School in Los Angeles and the University of Southern California (USC), where he played college baseball for the Trojans. He played for the United States national baseball team in the 1984 Summer Olympics.

The Texas Rangers selected Akins in the third round of the 1984 MLB draft. The Rangers released him during spring training in 1986, and he signed with the Atlanta Braves' organization. The Braves added him to their 40-man roster after the 1987 season.

== Personal life ==
Akins is a cousin of pitcher Randy Wolf and umpire Jim Wolf.
