= Akimitsu =

- Gender: Male

Origin
- Origin: Japanese
- Meaning: Different meanings depending on the kanji used

Akimitsu (written: 右光, 彬光, 昭光 or 顕光) is a masculine Japanese given name. Notable people with the name include:

- Fujiwara no Akimitsu (藤原 顕光; 944–1021), Japanese noble
- Ishikawa Akimitsu (石川 昭光; 1550–1622), Japanese samurai
- Akimitsu Itoh (伊東 昭光; born 1963), Japanese baseball pitcher
- Akimitsu Takagi (高木 彬光; 1920–1995), Japanese writer
- Akimitsu Takase (高瀬 右光; born 1970), Japanese voice actor
