= Steve Wilstein =

American sportswriter (born 1948)

- Born: September 1, 1948 (age 78)
- Education: University of Wisconsin-Madison (1970)
- Occupations: Sports writer, book author, photographer
- Employer(s): United Press International, Associated Press (AP)
- Notable work: Exposing Mark McGwire's use of androstenedione

Steve Wilstein (born September 1, 1948) is an American sports writer, book author and photographer.

Wilstein reported Mark McGwire's use of the testosterone booster androstenedione during the home run race in 1998, the first news story to expose and corroborate the use of anabolic steroids in baseball. Wilstein's stories and columns led to revelations that resulted in Congressional hearings, drug-testing in the major leagues for the first time, a U.S. Food and Drug Administration (FDA) ban on androstenedione, and the federal Anabolic Steroid Control Act of 2004. His work was cited as pivotal by former Senator George J. Mitchell in his 2007 report to the commissioner of baseball on steroids in the sport, after a twenty-month probe, and was chronicled in the books Game of Shadows and Juicing the Game, and detailed in the ESPN The Magazine series, "Who Knew?"

In 2009 the Seattle chapter of the Baseball Writers' Association of America nominated Wilstein for the Hall of Fame's J.G. Taylor Spink award "for meritorious contributions to baseball writing". In 2010, Wilstein was featured in filmmaker Ken Burns's PBS baseball documentary, "The Tenth Inning". In 2021, Wilstein was featured in the podcast series Crushed by "Religion of Sports".

Wilstein is the author of The AP Sports Writing Handbook, which is used as a primary text in many college journalism classes. Wilstein continues to provide commentary about developments in the "Steroid Era", although he retired from the AP in 2005.

== Major League Baseball's "steroid era" ==
The use of steroids by players had been only hinted at until Wilstein's story on August 21, 1998, when McGwire and the Chicago Cubs' Sammy Sosa were closing in on Roger Maris's 1961 record of sixty-one homers in one season – a chase that captivated the country. After Wilstein saw the bottle of androstenedione in McGwire's open locker while covering the chase, McGwire first denied using it, then admitted he had been taking it for more than a year when confronted by Wilstein's colleague at the AP, Nancy Armour. McGwire commented, "Everybody that I know in the game of baseball uses the same stuff I use."

Wilstein's story focused on the disparity of steroid rules in different sports. Andro, sold at the time as an over-the-counter supplement that boosted testosterone levels, was allowed in baseball but not in the Olympics, the NFL, pro tennis and all U.S. NCAA college sports. Shot putter Randy Barnes, the 1996 Olympic gold medalist and world record-holder, had recently drawn a lifetime ban for using andro, reported Wilstein, who had written extensively about steroids in the Olympics since the mid-1980s.

"The ensuing AP news story led to renewed scrutiny of the use of 'andro' and other substances by major league players," the Mitchell Report said. "... [C]ommissioner [Bud] Selig and others in baseball have said that this incident more than any other caused them to focus on the use of performance-enhancing substances as a possible problem".

Wilstein had witnessed an episode of "roid rage" by Canadian sprinter Ben Johnson after a preliminary heat at the 1988 Seoul Olympics and watched from the finish line as Johnson beat Carl Lewis in the 100-meter final. Johnson soon lost his gold and was sent home in disgrace after testing positive for an anabolic steroid. Andro, Wilstein wrote in the story about McGwire, "is seen outside baseball as cheating and potentially dangerous".

The story set off a controversy that has gone on for more than a decade of follow-ups by Wilstein and those who joined in about steroids and the related sports and social issues, among them McGwire's former "Bash Brother", Jose Canseco, in his tell-all books, and reporters covering the BALCO federal investigation in San Francisco.

McGwire was the first among numerous stars on various teams – including pitcher Roger Clemens, sluggers Barry Bonds, Alex Rodriguez and Rafael Palmeiro, and former MVP Ken Caminiti—whose reputations and records were tainted as revelations appeared about their alleged or admitted performance-enhancing drug use.

Washington Post baseball writer Thomas Boswell in 1988 and the Los Angeles Times Bob Nightengale in 1995 had touched on the baseball steroids issue, but without specifics were largely ignored. "Instead of sparking a wave of follow-up articles or investigations to ferret out the details of steroid use in baseball … sports writers essentially left the story alone," Editor & Publisher writer Joe Strupp wrote in a 2006 report headlined, "Sports writers say they dropped the ball on steroids in major league sports."

Strupp noted in an earlier E&P report in 2006 that "Wilstein's discovery marked the first real press probe into which substances and supplements baseball players were using, and what effect they were having on their accomplishments, abilities and health" "But then a funny thing happened," Strupp wrote in his account of the media's response. "Instead of being praised for discovering a questionable act by a baseball star in the middle of a record-breaking season, Wilstein was vilified."

Wilstein "noticed a bottle of androstenedione and opened up a can of worms," USA Today baseball columnist Hal Bodley wrote in 2005. "This was baseball's feel-good story that no one, including Selig and the union, wanted tainted by a performance-enhancing supplement few of us knew anything about."

On January 11, 2010, Wilstein's suspicions and Jose Canseco's allegations of McGwire's steroid use were confirmed by Mark McGwire in a statement to and interview with the Associated Press and later interviews with Bob Costas and others by McGwire. Upon the news, many sports columnists and media spoke of Wilstein's vindication and CNN asked Wilstein to provide his views in an op-ed piece. Wilstein wrote that McGwire should be banned from Major League Baseball for life and that his acts hurt baseball more than those of Pete Rose.

== Personal life ==
In 1970, Wilstein graduated from the University of Wisconsin-Madison with a political-science degree and began his career in journalism a year later working for United Press International as a sports writer from 1971 through 1978.

== Journalism awards ==
His awards include the National Headliner Award for a feature on boxer Jerry Quarry’s brain damage, the John Hancock business writing award for coverage of the 1987 stock market crash, and three AP Managing Editors awards for features on injured New York Jets player Dennis Byrd, illegal sports gambling's ties to organized crime, and former Los Angeles Dodger Glenn Burke’s struggle with AIDS. Wilstein won a record twenty AP Sports Editors awards for his work covering the Olympics, Super Bowls, World Series, college football bowl games, the Grand Slam of tennis, sports business, race and gender in sports and other issues.
