= Cleveland High School (Los Angeles) =

Grover Cleveland Charter High School
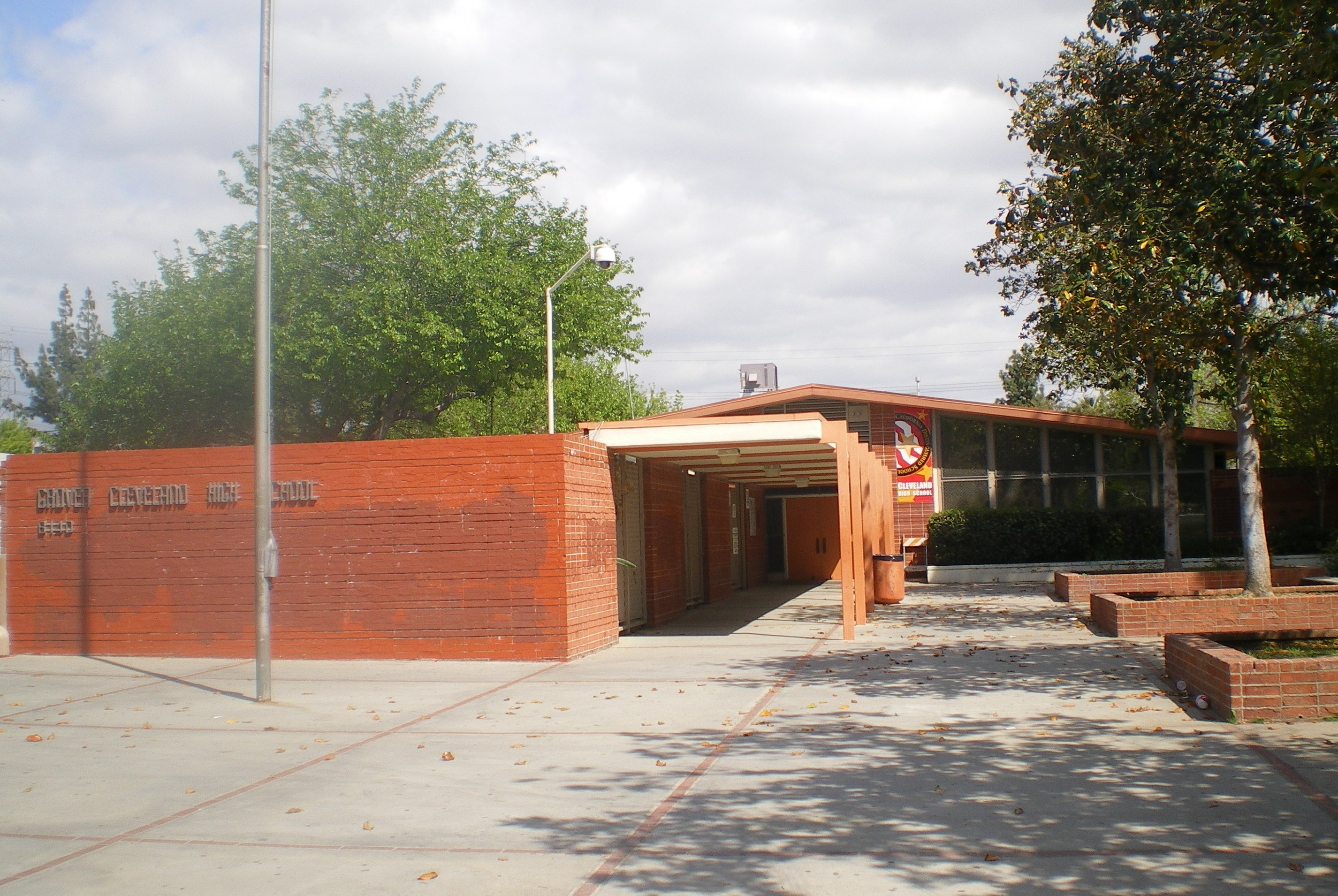

Location
- 8140 Vanalden Avenue; Los Angeles, California 91335; United States; 34°13′4″N 118°32′51″W

Information
- Type: Public school
- Established: 1959
- Locale: City, Large
- School district: Los Angeles Unified School District
- NCES District ID: 0622710
- NCES School ID: 062271002923
- Principal: Cindy Duong
- Teaching staff: 120.46 (on an FTE basis)
- Grades: 9–12
- Enrollment: 2,719 (2024–25)
  - Male: 1,349
  - Female: 1,370
- Student to teacher ratio: 22.57
- Colors: Red, white and black
- Athletics conference: CIF Los Angeles City Section
- Nickname: Cavaliers
- Newspaper: Le Sabre
- Yearbook: Les Mémoires
- Website: clevelandhs.org

Grover Cleveland Charter High School is a public school serving grades 9–12. Cleveland Humanities Magnet is part of Cleveland Charter High School. The school is located along the community of Reseda Ranch within the neighborhood of Reseda, in the San Fernando Valley portion of the city of Los Angeles, California. Cleveland offers certain pathways and academic programs to personalize learning to the students, allowing for self-exploration. Cleveland offers a Media Arts, Visual Arts, STEM, Performing Arts, Liberal Studies, and World Language pathway. Cleveland's academic programs include the Academy of Art and Technology (AOAT) and the School for Advanced Studies (SAS). It has two magnet programs including the Humanities Magnet and the Global Media Studies Magnet.

Cleveland, a part of the Los Angeles Unified School District, was named after President Grover Cleveland.

It was in the Los Angeles City High School District until 1961, when it merged into LAUSD.

In 2010, Cleveland High School was named one of the "Best High Schools in America" by Newsweek magazine and spotlighted for being in the top 3% of public high schools.

== Academics ==
According to U.S. News & World Report, Cleveland ranked among America's top 2,000 high schools, 253rd in California, and 23rd in the Los Angeles Unified School District for the 2025–26 school year. 53% of students participate in AP courses, with 46% of students passing at least one AP exam. The graduation rate is 93%.

=== Academic programs ===
The Academy of Art and Technology (AOAT) was established in 2004 at Cleveland High School. AOAT, a California Partnership Academy and California Lighthouse Academy, offers an art and technology-based education. Students are educated in graphic design, web design, and illustration. The programs mission is to provide all students with skills to succeed in the workforce and college.

The School for Advanced Studies (SAS) provides state-identified gifted students with a rigorous program of study that aligns with the UC system admission requirements. SAS offers students college-level studies in English, social sciences, mathematics, biological and physical sciences, and languages other than English. Students can choose from 23 Advanced Program courses and other on-campus college classes offered at Cleveland High School.

The Humanities Magnet was established in 1981. The curriculum explores the history and modern expressions of diverse ideas, multicultural ideas, and the functions of art through the ages. The Humanities program also known as CORE focuses on giving students an education based on our development, culture, diversity, and similar attributes.

The Global Media Studies Magnet (GMS) focuses on social justice themes and communication arts. Students learn to communicate their ideas through film and animations. Students learn to use media skills for the good of global community and are given the chance to engage with students around the world to explore current social issues.

In 2022, a $170 million modernization project was completed which included a 450-seat performing art center, two multi-story classroom buildings, and more.

== Notable alumni ==
- Sid Akins, baseball player, Olympian
- Max Boot, journalist
- Patrisse Cullors, activist, co-founder Black Lives Matter
- Wally Dempsey, professional football player
- Pamela Des Barres, rock and roll groupie
- Lucious Harris, former NBA player
- Leslie-Anne Huff, actress
- Victoria Justice, actress
- Blair Levin, policy analyst and commentator
- Harvey Levin, TMZ founder
- Chris Reed (baseball), former Baseball Player for the Miami Marlins
- Bret Saberhagen, former MLB pitcher
- Charles Martin Smith, actor, director
- Don Stark, actor
- Nick Young, former NBA player
