= Hitting mechanics =

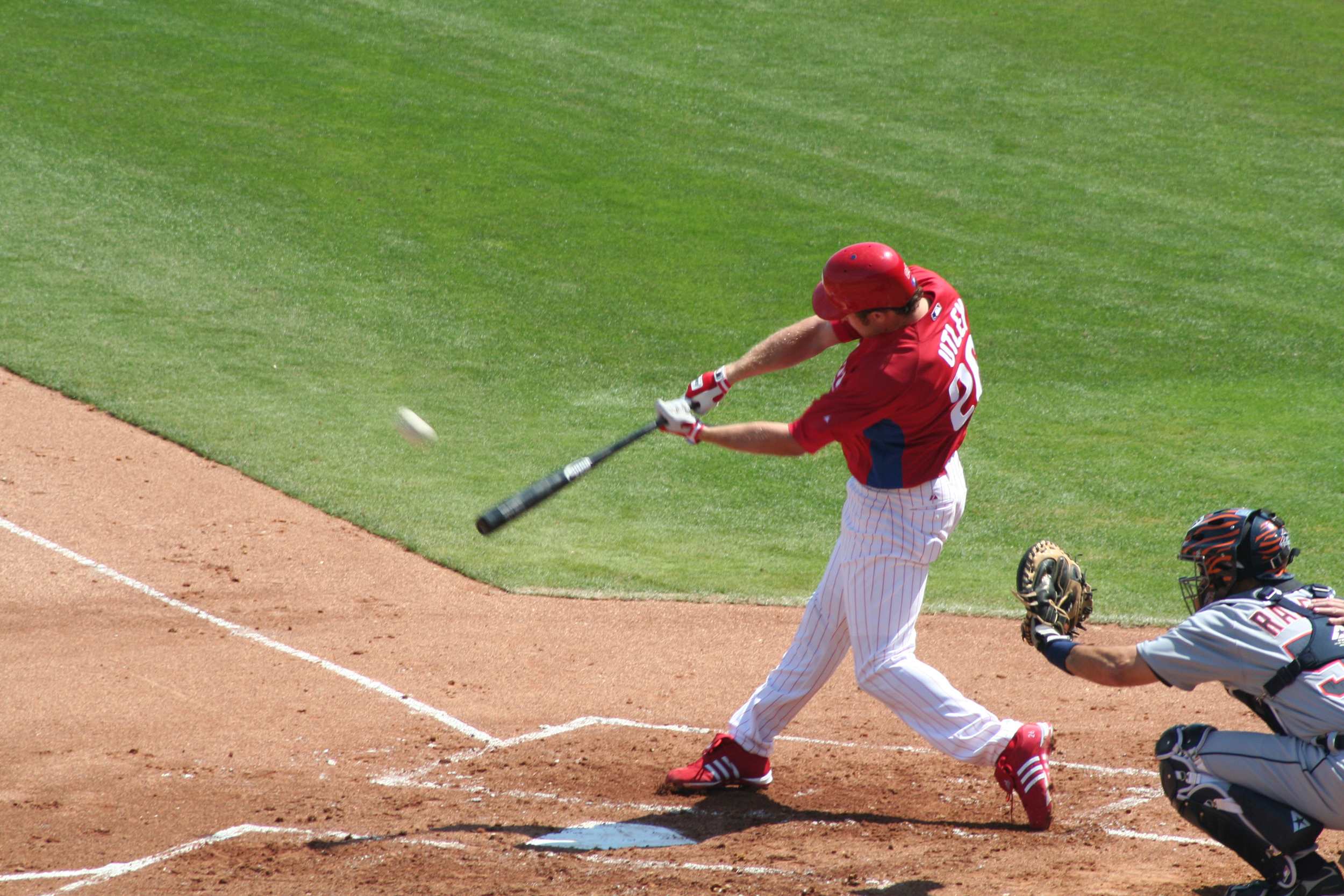
Chase Utley Home Run

In baseball, hitting mechanics studies the biomechanical motion that governs the swing of a baseball player. The goal of biomechanics in hitting during baseball training is to study and improve upon the physics involved in hitting. This includes optimizing a player's swing for either maximizing their "bat speed" or time for plate coverage. There is a wide range of batting stances and mechanics that are developed through individual preferences. However, when comparing among experienced baseball players, their batting mechanics approach are almost similar.

== Hitting analysis ==
Hitters have a wide variation of swings, but in the end staying balanced and having stable posture is the most important aspect of hitting a baseball. If the hitter becomes unbalanced throughout the swing the chance of making solid contact with the baseball is very slim. Once balanced throughout the swing, bat speed comes into the next most important aspect of the baseball swing. The faster the bat speed, the faster the ball will come off the bat. Furthermore, researchers have long established that home run hits are dependent on swing speed. Most notably, one can logically assume that a faster swing will result in the ball traveling farther. A 3-6% increase in bat speed can significantly affect the distance a ball travels after contact in competition (7). In terms of simple physics and mathematics, the conservation of momentum (E1) and a kinematic equation (E2) also reinforces this idea.

- (E1): (Mass1*Velocity1 = Mass2*Velocity2)
- (E2): (distance = Velocity (initial) *time + 0.5 *acceleration *time^2)

A study used an intensive mathematical program (finite element analysis software) to confirm that ball exit velocity is indeed dependent on linear bat velocity. These findings and observations confirm that a faster swing will be beneficial to a baseball player. In a research done by Welsh and et al. for the Journal of Orthopaedic and Sport Physical Therapy, they found that every baseball player goes through three critical phases during their swing. The three phases are foot off, foot down, and ball contact. In addition, they found that maximum hip rotation (around 714 degrees per second) happens right after foot down and maximum bat velocity (around 31 meters per second) before ball contact. These are significant markers since the hips generate the power needed for the bat speed which determines the distance the ball travels. Most biomechanics research hypothesis involving baseball takes those parameters as key values that can determine the success of a hitter. Furthermore, a hitter's mechanics will also includes an initial short “windup” motion and a final follow through phase that completes the motion.

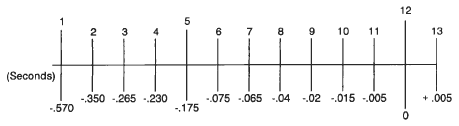
Sequence of events occurring in a baseball swing in relation to ball contact. Events: I) foot off, 2) maximum hip rotation, 3) maximum shoulder rotation, 4) maximum arm rotation, 5) foot down, 6) maximum hip rotational velocity, 7) maximum shoulder and arm rotational velocity, 8) maximum Y and Z components of bat linear velocity, 9) bat lag maximum rotational velocity, 10) maximum bat linear velocity and maximum right elbow extension velocity, 11 ) maximum X component of bat linear velocity, 12) ball contact, and 13) maximum left elbow extension velocity.

== Biomechanic description of hitting ==
From the anatomic position, a common baseball player batting from the right side will exhibit these movements before the pitch. The hitter will start with both knees, ankles, and elbows in flexion and adducted. In addition, the shoulder will be slightly elevated, hand medially rotated, right arm abducted, left arm adducted, fingers full flexed around the bat, and neck externally rotated towards the pitcher. During the pitcher's windup, the hitter will continue to flex his/her left knee and extend their left ankle off the ground while rotating their hips away from the pitcher. After the pitch is thrown, the hitter will then fully extend their elbows, left knee, and left ankle while rotating their hips towards the pitcher. After perceived ball contact, the hips continue to rotate along with continue extension towards hyperextension of the elbow.

== Hitting Phases ==
Baseball hitting mechanics are far more complex than many believe. It is a science of best utilizing the kinetic chain in order to travel energy from lower body to upper body, and then using that energy when making contact with the ball. There are several phases of the baseball swing. First is the Preparatory Phase, second the Stance Phase, third the Stride Phase, fourth the Drive Phase, fifth Bat Acceleration Phase, and last Follow-Through Phase. Mastering these six phases allows for a baseball player to have their best possible swing. The baseball swing is all about creating and transferring the maximum amount of energy from your body into the ball. This leads to higher velocity and higher success.

The Preparatory Phase involves the stance of the hitter prior to the hitting cycle. The stance of the batter tends to be based on batter preference and comfort. This then leads into the Stance Phase.

This phase involves coiling as much energy as possible onto the back leg while staying balanced. The hitter doesn’t not want to load with too much extent, because it can cause them to lose balance and lose that energy. This then leads into the Stride Phase.

The Stride Phase is when the hitter takes the energy coiled onto their back leg and begin transferring it forward toward the incoming ball. Stride length and timing is crucial. One must strive linear to the ball and also stride far enough that the maximum amount of energy is being transferred. The timing is also important as a too long or too short stride may effect the hitters balance and contact timing with the baseball. It’s important the stride timing is accurate to ensure proper connection with the ball. The next phase is the Drive Phase.

This is phase is associated with the bat lag. As the batter is transferring energy forward they are keeping their arms extending back and the bat to be “lagged” or delayed from the rest of the body. The arms of the batter should have a sort of rubber band effect as the back elbow increases flexion versus the front elbow. The baseball bat should also be 45 degrees in the frontal plane, or the knob of the bat should be facing the catcher. The next phase is the Bat Acceleration Phase.

In this phase the hips will turn first towards the pitcher, with the bat following behind. This is where the body begins to uncoil as it releases all of the built up energy from the loading phase and transferring it all into the baseball upon contact. This motion allows for the maximum velocity of the baseball swing and transfers the most velocity to the baseball on contact. On contact, the elbows should be extended with the top hand facing up and the bottom hand facing downward. This then leads into our next phase, the Follow-Through Phase.

In this phase the hips are fully rotated towards the pitcher. The bat then makes a full rotation around the body. At the end of the swing the batters laces of the rear shoe should be facing toward the pitcher. Though these steps are very complex and contain many important details, all of this happens within seconds as the batter swings. Hence, the difficulty and undervalued complexity of this motion.
