= Shane Mack (baseball) =

American baseball player (born 1963)

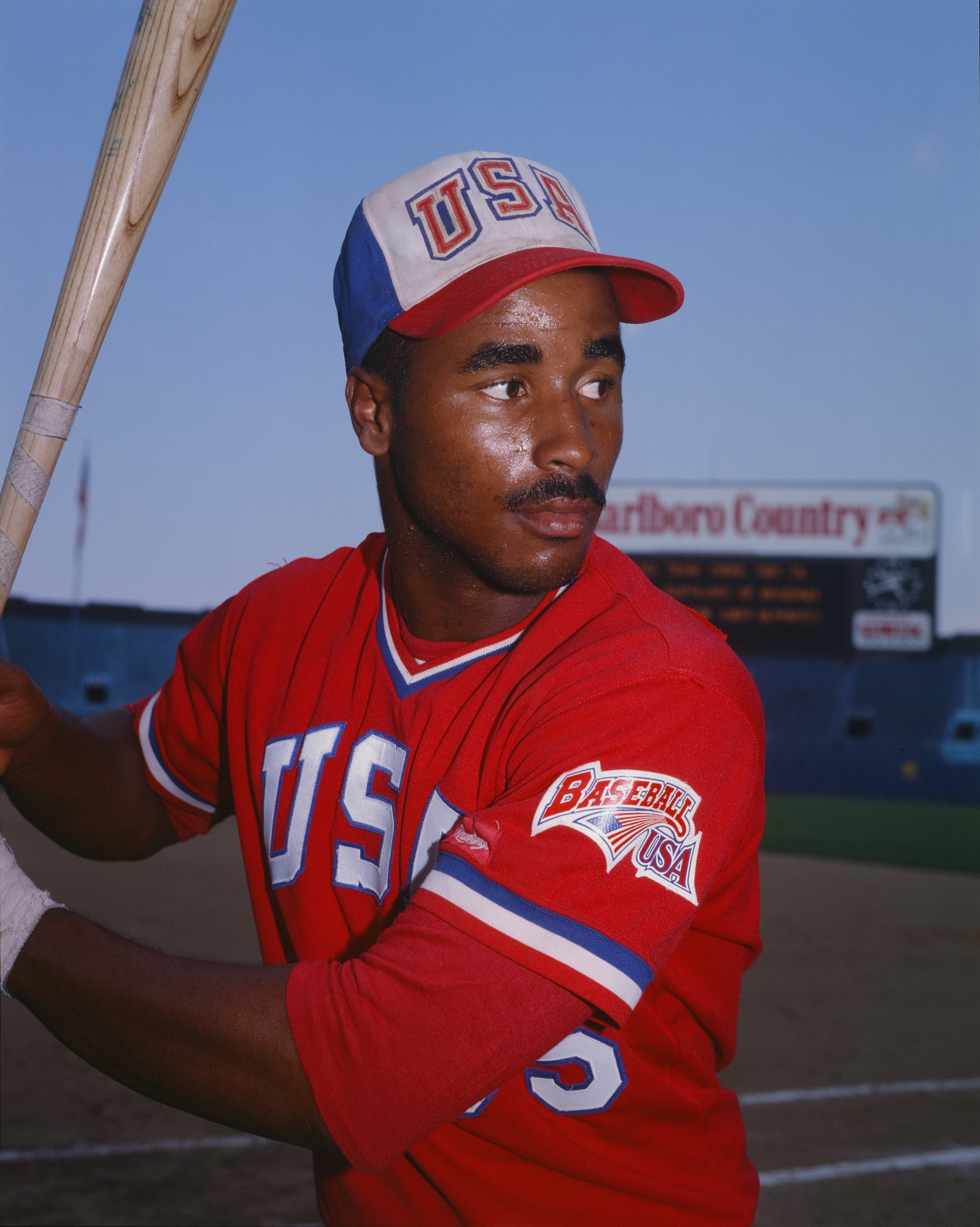
- Outfielder
- Born: December 7, 1963 (age 62); Los Angeles, California, U.S.
- Batted: Right Threw: Right

Professional debut
- MLB: May 25, 1987, for the San Diego Padres
- NPB: April 7, 1995, for the Yomiuri Giants

Last appearance
- NPB: October 24, 1996, for the Yomiuri Giants
- MLB: July 30, 1998, for the Kansas City Royals

MLB statistics
- Batting average: .299
- Home runs: 80
- Runs batted in: 398

NPB statistics
- Batting average: .284
- Home runs: 42
- Runs batted in: 127
- Stats at Baseball Reference

Teams
- San Diego Padres (1987–1988); Minnesota Twins (1990–1994); Yomiuri Giants (1995–1996); Boston Red Sox (1997); Oakland Athletics (1998); Kansas City Royals (1998)

Career highlights and awards
- World Series champion (1991)
Medals
Men's baseball
Representing United States
Olympic Games
Silver medal – second place	1984 Los Angeles	Team

Shane Lee Mack (born December 7, 1963) is an American former professional baseball outfielder in Major League Baseball (MLB). After starring for the UCLA Bruins baseball team and winning a silver medal with at 1984 Olympic Baseball Team, Mack was a #1 draft pick of the San Diego Padres and played for the Padres, Minnesota Twins, and Yomiuri Giants, Boston Red Sox, Oakland Athletics, and Kansas City Royals in a 13 year major league career.

== Career ==
=== College ===
Mack played for Richard Gahr High School in Cerritos, California, from 1978-1981. Upon graduation, he accepted an athletic scholarship to play for the UCLA Bruins baseball team where he starred from 1982-1984. His career college statistics include a .361 batting average, 29 home runs, 142 runs batted in, 158 runs scored and 44 stolen bases. Mack was the runner-up for the Pac-10 Conference Most Valuable Player (MVP) in 1983. His .419 batting average that year was the seventh best all-time in the Pac-10. Mack was selected to the All-Pac-10 and All-American College Baseball Teams in 1983 and 1984.

Days before the draft, the Los Angeles Times described Mack as “the finest all-around player in college baseball” and “near the top of virtually every major-league club’s scouting list.” Mack was the 11th player selected in the 1st round of the major league draft in 1984. Following college, he played on the U.S. Olympic baseball team which won a silver medal in the 1984 Olympic Games in Los Angeles.

=== Major Leagues ===
Mack skipped the low levels of the Padres' minor leagues after being drafted, jumping directly to Double A, with mediocre results in 1985 and 1986, but a strong Triple-A stretch to begin 1987 (and a Steve Garvey injury) got him called up to San Diego. However low numbers in 1988 and an elbow injury in 1989 left the now six-year minor leaguer at a crossroads. Frustrated with the lack of production from their former #1 pick, hitting only .241/.312/.331 with 3 homeruns in 161 games, the Padres left Mack off the team's 40-man roster exposing him into the 1989 Rule 5 Draft. Mack was picked by the Minnesota Twins with ironically the draft's 11th pick. Mack's pickup, along with the 1999 selection of Johan Santana, are arguably the Twins most successful Rule 5 selections in the team's history.

Given the fresh start, Mack never stopped hitting and earned an everyday spot in rightfield in 1991, playing rightfield beside future Hall of Fame centerfielder Kirby Puckett, and keying the team's run to a second World Series championship in four years. In 1992, Mack moved to leftfield, following the departure of Dan Gladden, and had his best year, hitting .315 (fifth in the American League), scoring 101 runs (seventh in the AL), stealing 26 bases, driving in 75 runs, and hitting 16 home runs. Mack then moved to centerfield, moving Puckett to right, for the 1993 and 1994 seasons. Mack starred for the Twins from 1990-1994 and became a free agent following the 1994 season.

Due to fallout from the 1994-95 MLB Strike, his only contract offer was from the Twins. Determining that the 2-year, $6.7M contract was unsatisfactory, Mack signed with the Japanese Baseball League Yomiuri Giants in a 2-year, $8.1M contract. Minnesota Twins General Manager Terry Ryan, Mack, and Mack's agent Eric Goldschmidt all expressed frustration on how the negotiations ended.

After playing for the Giants in 1995 & 1996, winning a championship in the latter year, Mack returned to the United States to play ball for the Boston Red Sox in the 1997 season. He then played for the Oakland Athletics and the Kansas City Royals in 1998 before retiring due to shoulder issues and a herniated disk in his back.

Mack's career statistics include a .299 lifetime batting average, 80 home runs, and 398 RBIs in 923 games. Defensively, he recorded a .985 fielding percentage at all three outfield positions. During his time with the Twins, Mack was even better hitting .309 / .375 / .479 in 633 games with the team. He also destroyed lefthanded pitchers while with the Twins, batting .340 with a .576 slugging percentage. His .976 on-base plus slugging percentage is the best in team history. Mack was inducted into the UCLA Athletics Hall of Fame on October 10, 2002.

== Personal life ==
His brother is former major league outfielder Quinn Mack.
