= Katsumi Hirosawa =

Japanese baseball player (born 1962)

- Infielder / Outfielder
- Born: April 10, 1962 (age 64); Ibaraki, Japan
- Batted: Right Threw: Right

NPB debut
- April 13, 1985, for the Yakult Swallows

Last NPB appearance
- October 27, 2003, for the Hanshin Tigers

NPB statistics (through 2003)
- Batting average: .275
- Hits: 1736
- Home runs: 306
- RBIs: 985
- Stats at Baseball Reference

Teams
- As player: Yakult Swallows (1985–1994); Yomiuri Giants (1995–1999); Hanshin Tigers (2000–2003); As coach: Hanshin Tigers (2007–2008)

Career highlights and awards
- Japan Series champion (1993); 4× Central League Best Nine Award (1988, 1990–1991, 1993); 2× Leader of RBI in Central League (1991, 1993); 8× NPB All-Star (1987–1994); NPB All-Star Game MVP (1991 Game 2)
Medals
Men's baseball
Representing Japan
Olympics
Gold medal – first place	1984 Los Angeles	Team competition
- Last updated on: 27 March 2022

Katsumi Hirosawa (広澤 克実, born April 10, 1962) is a former Nippon Professional Baseball player. A slugger who divided his time between infield (first base and third base) and the outfield, Hirosawa played for the Yakult Swallows, the Yomiuri Giants, and the Hanshin Tigers. Hirosawa was a four-time Central League Best Nine Award-winner, an eight-time NPB All-Star (including winning the NPB All-Star Game MVP in the 1991 Game 2), and twice led the Central League in RBI.

Before joining the Swallows, Hirosawa played baseball for Japan in the 1984 Summer Olympics. Although baseball was a demonstration sport during that Olympics (and no medals were awarded), the Japanese team defeated the United States to take the "gold medal."

Hirosawa was part of the Central League-champion Swallows team that lost the 1992 Japan Series to Seibu, as well as the championship team that defeated the Lions in a rematch in 1993.

Hirosawa topped off his playing career as part of the 2003 Hanshin Tigers squad that narrowly lost the Japan Series to the Fukuoka Daiei Hawks.

After retiring he served as a coach on the Tigers from 2007 to 2008.

== See also ==
- List of top Nippon Professional Baseball home run hitters
