= Yukio Arai =

Japanese baseball player (born 1964)

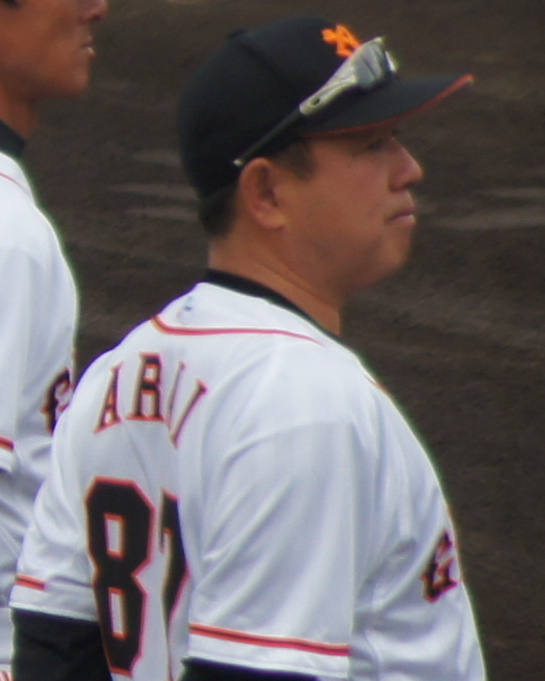
- Outfielder / Coach
- Born: October 13, 1964 (age 61); Kanazawa-ku, Yokohama, Kanagawa, Japan
- Batted: Left Threw: Left

NPB debut
- September 24, 1986, for the Yakult Swallows

Last appearance
- October 10, 2000, for the Yokohama BayStars

NPB statistics (through 2000 season)
- Batting average: .270
- Hits: 782
- RBIs: 276
- Home runs: 55
- Stats at Baseball Reference

Teams
- As player: Yakult Swallows (1986–1995); Kintetsu Buffaloes (1996–1997); Yokohama BayStars (1998–2000); As coach: Yakult Swallows/Tokyo Yakult Swallows (2001–2007); Hokkaido Nippon-Ham Fighters (2008–2009); Yomiuri Giants (2010–2014)

Career highlights and awards
- 1987 Central League Rookie of the Year
Medals
Men's baseball
Representing Japan
Gold medal – first place	1984 Los Angeles	Team competition

Yukio Arai (荒井 幸雄, Arai Yukio) (born October 13, 1964) is a former Japanese professional baseball player. He played for the Yakult Swallows in the Japan Central League. He later played for the Kintetsu Buffaloes of the Japan Pacific League. He ended his career playing with the Yokohama BayStars of the Japan Central League.
