= Mark McGwire =

American baseball player and coach (born 1963)

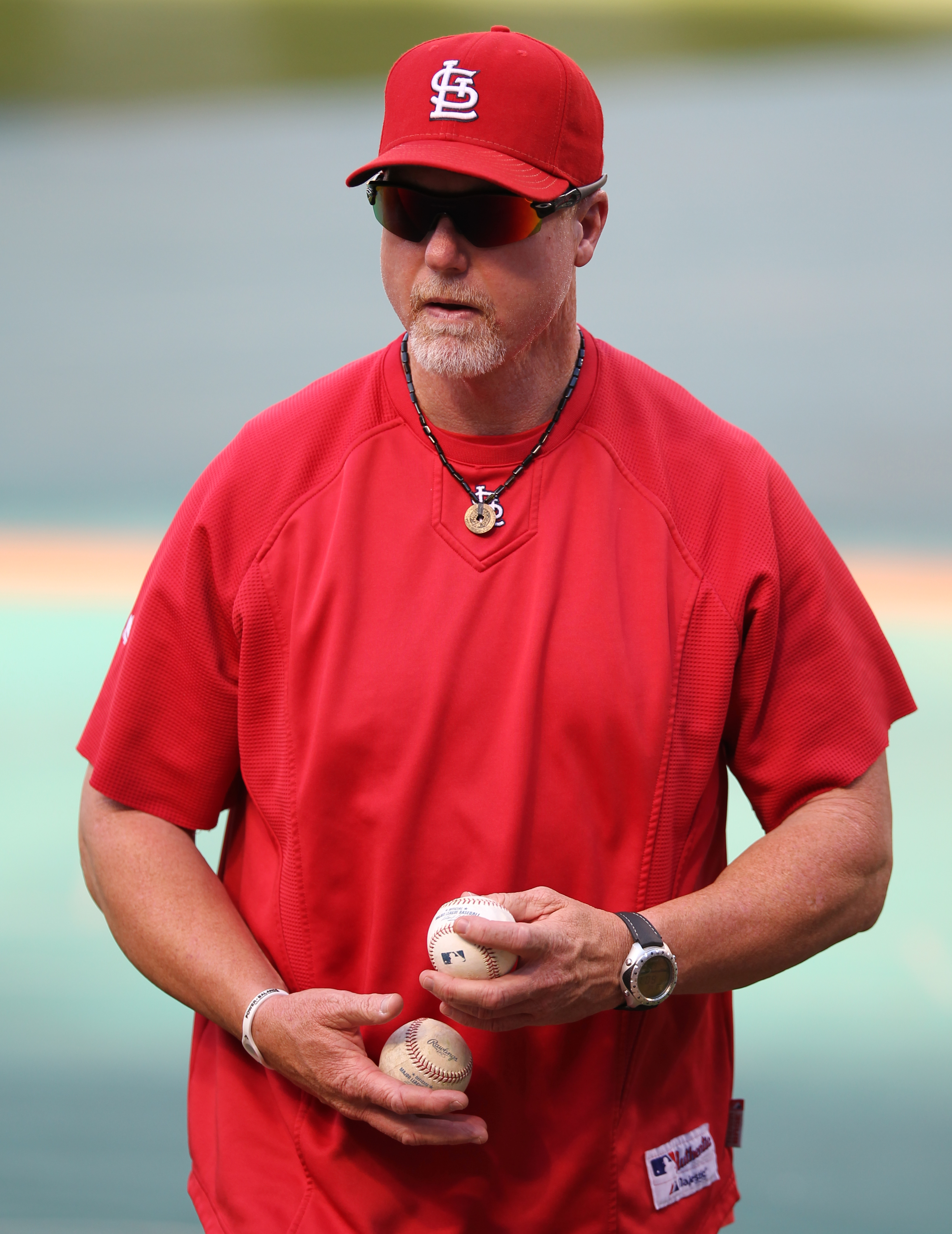
- McGwire with the St. Louis Cardinals in 2011
- First baseman
- Born: October 1, 1963 (age 63); Pomona, California, U.S.
- Batted: Right Threw: Right

MLB debut
- August 22, 1986, for the Oakland Athletics

Last MLB appearance
- October 7, 2001, for the St. Louis Cardinals

MLB statistics
- Batting average: .263
- Home runs: 583
- Runs batted in: 1,414
- Stats at Baseball Reference

Teams
- As player: Oakland Athletics (1986–1997); St. Louis Cardinals (1997–2001); As coach: St. Louis Cardinals (2010–2012); Los Angeles Dodgers (2013–2015); San Diego Padres (2016–2018)

Career highlights and awards
- 12× All-Star (1987–1992, 1995–2000); 2× World Series champion (1989, 2011); AL Rookie of the Year (1987); Gold Glove Award (1990); 3× Silver Slugger Award (1992, 1996, 1998); 5× MLB home run leader (1987, 1996–1999); NL RBI leader (1999); Commissioner's Historic Achievement Award; Athletics Hall of Fame; St. Louis Cardinals Hall of Fame; Major League Baseball All-Century Team
Medals
Representing United States
Men's baseball
Summer Olympics
Silver medal – second place	1984 Los Angeles	Team
Pan American Games
Bronze medal – third place	1983 Caracas	Team
Intercontinental Cup
Silver medal – second place	1983 Brussels	Team

Mark David McGwire (born October 1, 1963), nicknamed "Big Mac", is an American former professional baseball first baseman. He played 16 seasons in Major League Baseball (MLB) for the Oakland Athletics and St. Louis Cardinals from 1986 to 2001. He was part of two World Series championship teams: Oakland as a player in 1989 and St. Louis as a coach in 2011. One of the most prolific home run hitters in baseball history, McGwire hit 583 home runs during his career, which ranked 5th-most in MLB history at the time of his retirement and currently ranks 11th. He holds the major-league career record for at bats per home run ratio (10.6), and is the former record holder for both home runs in a single season (70 in 1998) and home runs hit by a rookie (49 in 1987). McGwire was one of several central figures in baseball's steroids scandal.

McGwire led the major leagues in home runs in five different seasons, and set the major-league record for home runs hit in a four-season period from 1996 to 1999 with 245. He demonstrated exemplary patience as a batter, producing a career .394 on-base percentage (OBP) and twice leading the major leagues in bases on balls. McGwire also led the league in runs batted in once, on-base percentage twice, and slugging percentage four times. Injuries cut short even greater potential, as he reached 140 games played in just eight of his 16 MLB seasons. Injuries particularly cut into his playing time in 2000 and 2001 and factored into his decision to retire. A right-handed batter and thrower, McGwire stood 6 feet 5 inches (1.96 m) tall and weighed 245 pounds (111 kg) during his playing career.

With the Cardinals in 1998, McGwire joined Cubs slugger Sammy Sosa in a chase for the single-season home-run record set by Roger Maris in 1961. McGwire surpassed Maris and finished with 70 home runs, a record that Barry Bonds would break three years later with 73.

In 2010, McGwire publicly admitted to using performance-enhancing drugs during a large portion of his career.

== Early life ==
McGwire was born in the Los Angeles suburb of Pomona, California. His father was a dentist. He attended Damien High School in La Verne, California, where he played baseball, golf, and basketball. He was drafted in the 8th round by the Montreal Expos in the 1981 amateur draft, but did not sign.

== College career ==
McGwire played college baseball at the University of Southern California, where he was a teammate of Randy Johnson, Jack Del Rio, and Rodney Peete under coach Rod Dedeaux. McGwire was named the college baseball player of the year by the Sporting News in 1984.

== Professional career ==
=== Draft and minor leagues ===
After three years at USC and a stint on the 1984 U.S. Olympic team, McGwire was drafted tenth overall in the 1984 Major League Baseball draft by the Oakland Athletics. In 1984 and 1985, he played for the Single-A Modesto A's. He began the 1986 season in the minors, with the Double-A Huntsville Stars and Triple-A Tacoma Tigers.

=== Oakland Athletics (1986–1997) ===
McGwire debuted in the major leagues on August 22, 1986. He did not get a hit until his third game, on August 24. In 18 games with Oakland in 1986, he hit three home runs and had nine runs batted in (RBIs), but had a lowly .189 batting average.

==== Rookie home-run record and major-league leader (1987) ====
Retaining his rookie status in 1987, McGwire hit four home runs in the month of April, but followed in May with 15 and another nine in June. Before the All-Star break arrived, he had totaled 33 home runs and earned a spot on the American League All-Star team. On August 11, he broke Al Rosen's AL rookie record of 37 home runs. Three days later, McGwire broke the major-league record of 38, which Frank Robinson and Wally Berger had jointly held. In September, McGwire hit nine more home runs while posting monthly personal bests of a .351 batting average, .419 on-base percentage (OBP) and 11 doubles (2B). With 49 home runs and two games remaining in the regular season for him to reach 50 home runs, he missed the games in order to attend the birth of his first child. McGwire also totaled 118 runs batted in, a .289 batting average, 97 runs scored, 28 doubles, a .618 slugging percentage and a .370 on-base percentage (OBP). McGwire's 49 home runs as a rookie stood as a major league record until Aaron Judge hit 52 for the New York Yankees in 2017.

Not only did McGwire lead the AL in home runs in 1987, but he also tied for the major-league lead with Chicago Cubs right fielder Andre Dawson. McGwire also led the major leagues in slugging, finished second in the AL in adjusted on-base plus slugging percentage (OPS+, 164) and total bases (344) and placed third in RBI and on-base plus slugging (OPS, .987). He was unanimously chosen as the AL Rookie of the Year Award and finished sixth overall in the AL Most Valuable Player Award voting.

==== More All-Star appearances (1988–1991) ====
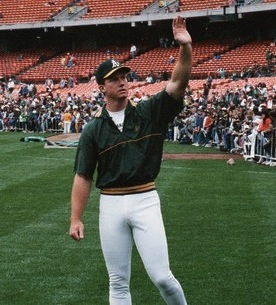
McGwire with the A's, 1989

From 1988 to 1990, McGwire followed with 32, 33, and 39 home runs, respectively, becoming the first Major Leaguer to hit 30+ home runs in each of his first four full seasons. On July 3 and 4, 1988, he hit game-winning home runs in the 16th inning of both games. Through May 2009, McGwire was tied for third all-time with Joe DiMaggio in home runs over his first two calendar years in the major leagues (71), behind Chuck Klein (83) and Ryan Braun (79).

McGwire's most famous home run with the A's was likely his game-winning solo shot in the bottom of the ninth inning of Game 3 of the 1988 World Series against the Los Angeles Dodgers and former A's closer Jay Howell. McGwire's game-winner brought the A's their only victory in the 1988 World Series, which they lost in five games; however, McGwire and his fellow Bash Brother, José Canseco, played a large part in the 1989 championship club that defeated the San Francisco Giants in the famous "Earthquake Series."

Working diligently on his defense at first base, McGwire bristled at the notion that he was a one-dimensional player. He was generally regarded as a good fielder in his early years, even winning a Gold Glove Award in 1990, the only one that the Yankees' Don Mattingly would not win between 1985 and 1994. In later years, his mobility decreased along with his defensive ability. His batting averages after his rookie season plummeted to .260, .231, and .235 from 1988 to 1990. In 1991, he bottomed out with a .201 average and 22 homers. Manager Tony La Russa sat him for the final game of the season to avoid causing his batting average to dip below .200. Despite the declining averages during this time of his career, McGwire's high base-on-balls totals allowed him to maintain an acceptable on-base percentage. In fact, when he hit .201, his OPS+ was 103, just over the league average.

McGwire stated in an interview with Sports Illustrated that 1991 was the "worst year" of his life, with his on-field performance and marriage difficulties, and that he "didn't lift a weight" that entire season. With all that behind him, McGwire rededicated himself to working out harder than ever and received visual therapy from a sports vision specialist.

==== Career resurgence (1992–1997) ====
The "new look" McGwire hit 42 homers and batted .268 in 1992, with an outstanding OPS+ of 175 (the highest of his career to that point), and put on a victorious home-run-hitting show at the Home Run Derby during the 1992 All-Star break. His performance propelled the A's to the American League West Division title in 1992, their fourth in five seasons. The A's lost in the playoffs to the eventual World Series champion Toronto Blue Jays.

Foot injuries limited McGwire to a total of 74 games in 1993 and 1994, and just nine home runs in each of the two seasons. He played just 104 games in 1995, but his proportional totals were much improved, as he hit 39 home runs in 317 at-bats. In 1996, McGwire belted a major-league-leading 52 homers in 423 at-bats. He also hit for a career-high .312 average and led the league in both slugging and on-base percentage.

McGwire's total of 363 home runs with the Athletics surpassed the previous franchise record. He was selected or voted to nine American League All-Star teams while playing for the A's, including six consecutive appearances from 1987 through 1992. On April 21, 1997, McGwire became the fourth and final player to hit a home run over the left-field roof of Detroit's Tiger Stadium, joining Harmon Killebrew, Frank Howard and Cecil Fielder. The blast was estimated to have traveled 491 feet.

=== St. Louis Cardinals (1997–2001) ===
On July 31, having already amassed 34 home runs in the 1997 season, McGwire was traded from the Oakland Athletics to the St. Louis Cardinals for T. J. Mathews, Eric Ludwick and Blake Stein. Despite playing just two-thirds of the season in the American League, he finished ninth in home runs. In 51 games with the Cardinals to finish the 1997 season, McGwire compiled a .253 batting average, 24 home runs, and 42 RBI. Overall in 1997, McGwire led the majors with 58 home runs. He also finished third in the major leagues in slugging percentage (.646), fourth in OPS (1.039), fifth in OPS+ (170), tenth in RBI (123), and ninth in walks (101). He placed 16th in the NL MVP voting.

It was the last year of his contract, so there was speculation that McGwire would play for the Cardinals only for the remainder of the season, then seek a long-term deal, possibly in Southern California, where he still lived; however, McGwire signed a contract to stay in St. Louis. It is also believed that McGwire later encouraged Jim Edmonds, another Southern California resident who was traded to St. Louis, to forgo free agency and sign a contract with the Cardinals in 2000.

==== Single-season home run record chase (1998) ====
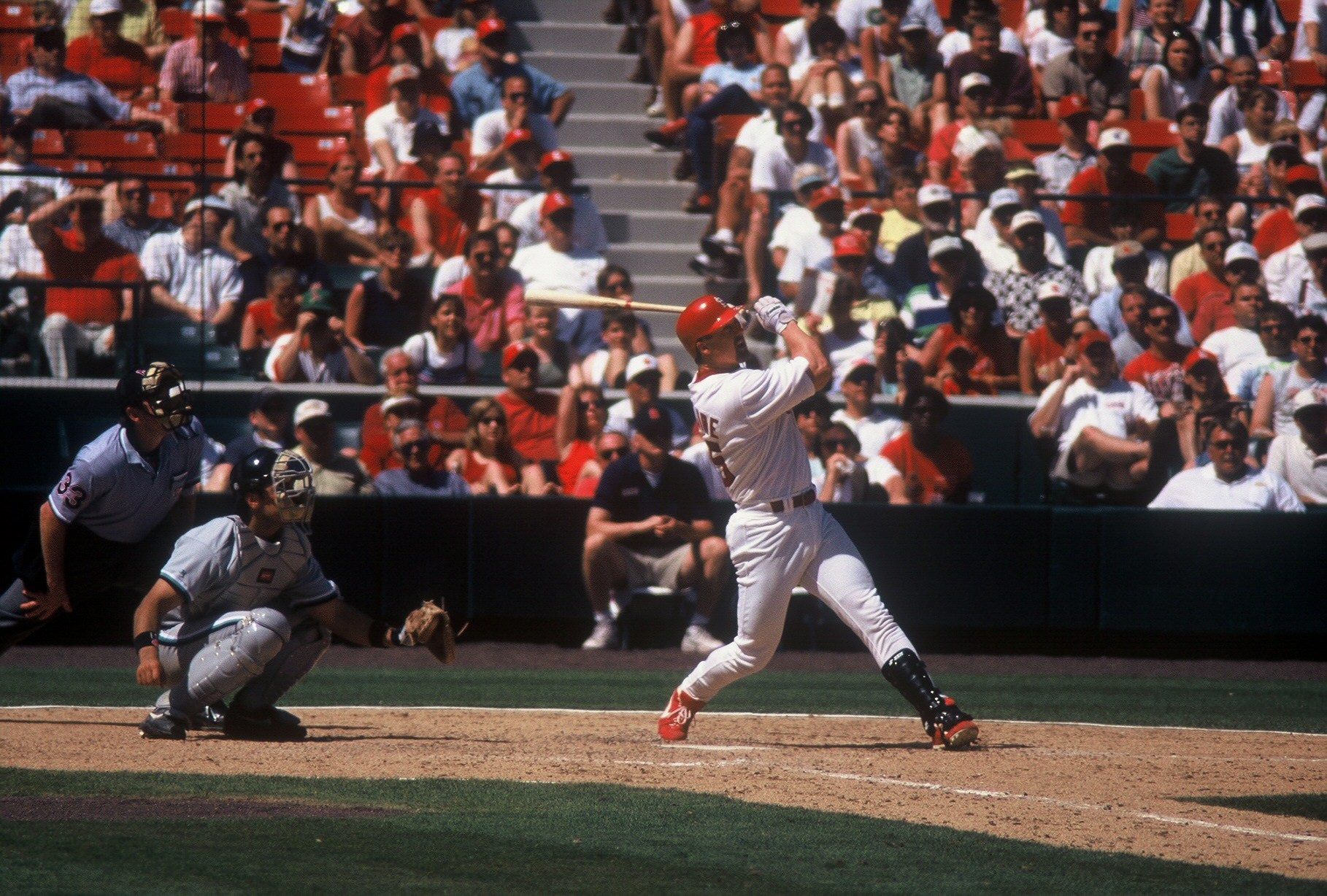
McGwire batting during a May 1998 game

As the 1998 season progressed, it became clear that McGwire, Seattle Mariners outfielder Ken Griffey Jr., and Chicago Cubs outfielder Sammy Sosa were all on track to break Roger Maris's single-season home run record. The race to break the record first attracted media attention as the home-run leader changed often throughout the season. On August 19, Sosa hit his 48th home run to move ahead of McGwire; however, later that day McGwire hit his 48th and 49th home runs to regain the lead.

On September 8, 1998, McGwire hit a pitch by the Cubs' Steve Trachsel over the left-field wall for his record-breaking 62nd home run, setting off massive celebrations at Busch Stadium. The fact that the game was against the Cubs meant that Sosa was able to congratulate McGwire personally on his achievement. Members of Maris's family were also present at the game. The ball was given to McGwire in a ceremony on the field by the stadium worker who found it.

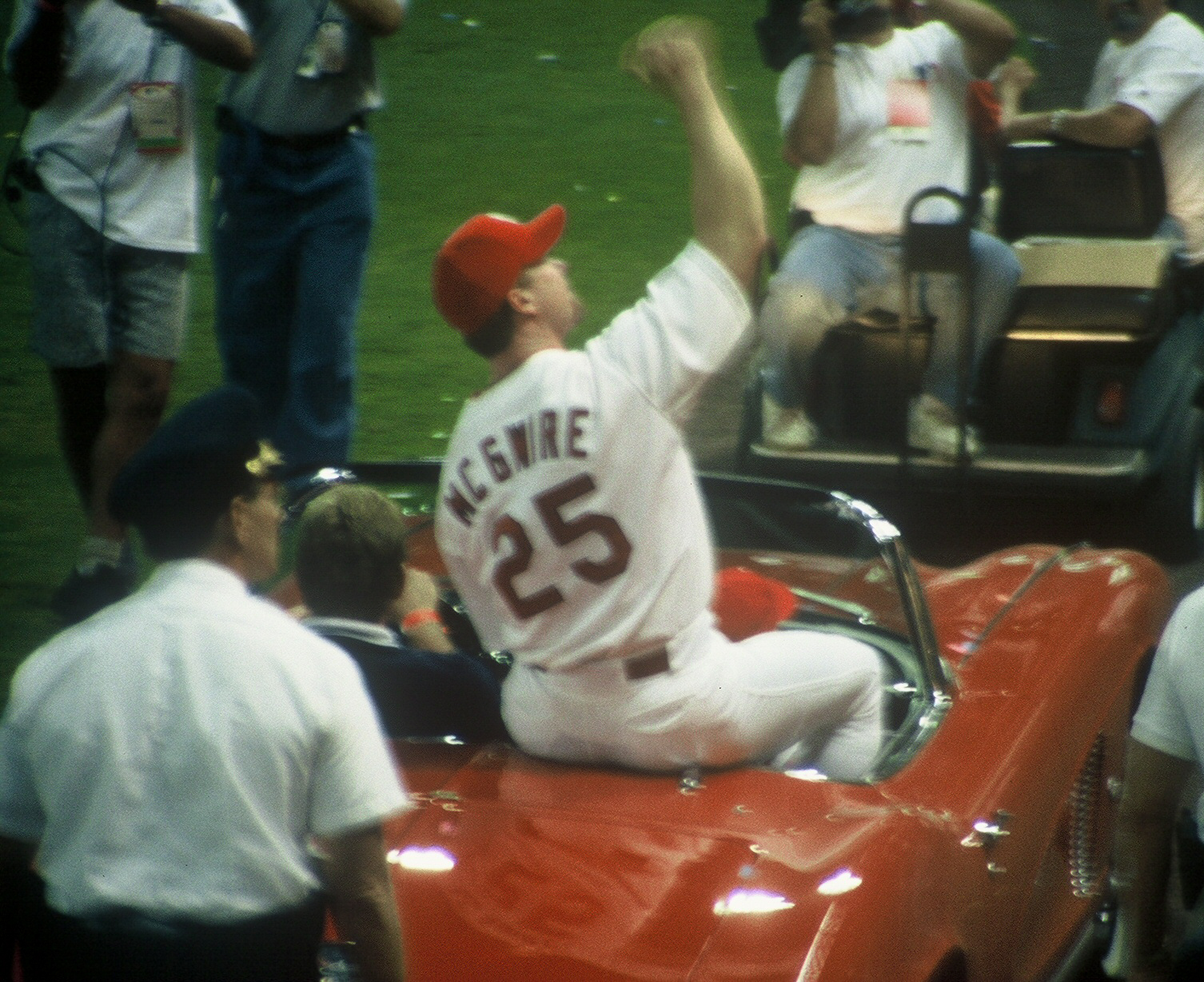
McGwire circling the field at Busch Memorial Stadium in a Chevrolet Corvette after hitting his 62nd home run of the season.

McGwire finished the 1998 season with 70 home runs (including five in his last three games), four ahead of Sosa's 66, a record that was broken three seasons later in 2001 by Barry Bonds with 73.

McGwire was honored with the inaugural Babe Ruth Home Run Award for leading Major League Baseball in home runs. Although McGwire had the prestige of the home-run record, Sammy Sosa (who had fewer home runs but more RBI and stolen bases) won the 1998 NL MVP award, as his contributions helped propel the Cubs to the playoffs (the Cardinals finished third in the NL Central). Many credited the Sosa-McGwire home run chase in 1998 with "saving baseball" by attracting new, younger fans and bringing back old fans soured by the 1994–95 Major League Baseball strike.

==== Later playing career (1999–2001) ====
McGwire kept his high level of offensive production from 1998 going in 1999 while setting or extending several significant records. With 65 home runs, he led MLB for the fourth consecutive season. It was also his fourth consecutive season with at least 50 home runs, extending his own major league record. Sosa, who hit 63 home runs in 1999, again trailed McGwire. Thus, they became the first, and still only, players in major league history to hit 60 or more home runs in consecutive seasons; both players played on teams that finished below .500, which also made them part of dubious history as the first players with 60 home runs for teams with a losing record, a mark that has not been matched since (for all players with 50-HR seasons, McGwire is the only player to have three come on losing teams). McGwire also set a record from 1998 to 1999 for home runs in a two-season period with 135. He also owned the highest four-season home-run total, with 245 from 1996 to 1999. In 1999, he drove in an NL-leading 147 runs while only having 145 hits, becoming the first player with more RBIs than hits in a season.

Following the 1999 season, McGwire and the Cardinals exercised a mutual option in his contract for the 2001 season which would pay him $11 million for the 2001 season. Shortly before the 2001 season, McGwire and the Cardinals agreed to another extension through the 2004 season for $30 million which, according to Phil Rogers in the Chicago Tribune, was far less than he could have made in free agency.

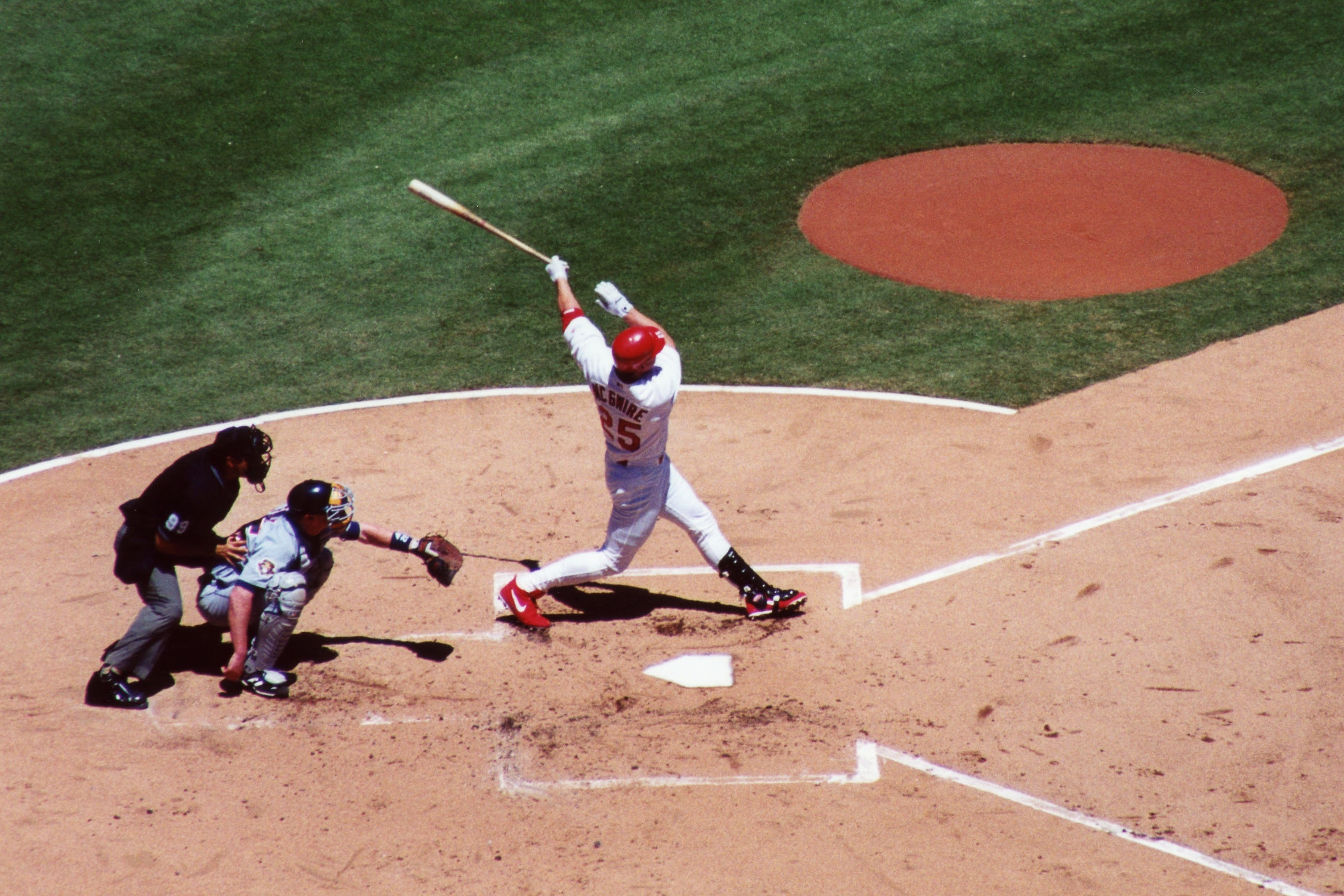
McGwire hitting a home run in St. Louis against the Tigers on July 14, 2001

However, in 2000 and 2001, McGwire's statistics declined relative to previous years as he struggled to avoid injury, specifically with his knee, which lessened his bat speed. McGwire missed two months of the 2000 season with patella tendinitis while noting his appreciation for coaching. In September, he was used primarily as a pinch-hitter. He played just 89 games and had 32 home runs. In the 2000 postseason, he was used a pinch hitter for six games, where he hit one home run (his fifth and final postseason home run) and walked twice as the Cardinals lost in the NLCS. He had surgery on his right knee to deal with tendinitis immediately the 2000 season ended. McGwire returned to play spring training and Opening Day in April (less than six months since the surgery), but his knee still bothered him, and after he went 2-for-21 (.095), he was moved to the disabled list on April 18. He ended missing a month. He ultimately played just 97 games that year and had 29 of his 56 hits go for home runs while batting .187. His last home run came on September 28 against Pittsburgh. In the NLDS, McGwire had just one hit in 11 at-bats and was pulled for a pinch-hitter in the 9th inning in decisive Game 5.

On November 11, 2001, McGwire announced his retirement, stating, "I am unable to perform at a level equal to the salary the organization would be paying me. I believe I owe it to the Cardinals and the fans of St. Louis to step aside, so a talented free agent can be brought in as the final piece of what I expect can be a world championship-caliber team."

== International career ==
McGwire played for the United States national team during his collegiate years. On the 1984 team, he batted .359 over 35 games. McGwire was selected to the roster for the Summer Olympics in Los Angeles that same year. That squad, which included future Hall of Famer Barry Larkin, emerged as the favorite for the competition, after Cuba joined the Soviet Union-led boycott of the games. The U.S. team won the silver medal in the tournament, with Japan winning the gold medal. McGwire finished the five-game competition batting 4-for-21 with no home runs. McGwire later said of the 1984 Olympics squad: "People may not have recognized it at the time, but that was definitely a dream team."

== Coaching career ==
=== St. Louis Cardinals (2010–2012) ===
After his playing career ended, McGwire demonstrated coaching ability, personally assisting players such as Matt Holliday, Bobby Crosby, and Skip Schumaker before accepting an official role as hitting coach with an MLB team. On October 26, 2009, Cardinals manager Tony La Russa confirmed that McGwire would become the club's fifth hitting coach of La Russa's tenure with the Cardinals, replacing Hal McRae. McGwire received a standing ovation prior to the Cardinals' home opener on April 12, 2010. In his three seasons as Cardinals hitting coach, the team's prolific offense led the National League in batting and on-base percentage, and the team finished second in runs scored.

=== Los Angeles Dodgers (2013–2015) ===
In early November 2012, McGwire rejected a contract extension to return as Cardinals hitting coach for the 2013 season. Instead, he accepted an offer for the same position with the Los Angeles Dodgers in order to be closer to his wife and five children.

On June 11, 2013, McGwire was ejected for the first time as a coach during a bench-clearing brawl with the Arizona Diamondbacks. He was suspended for two games starting the next day.

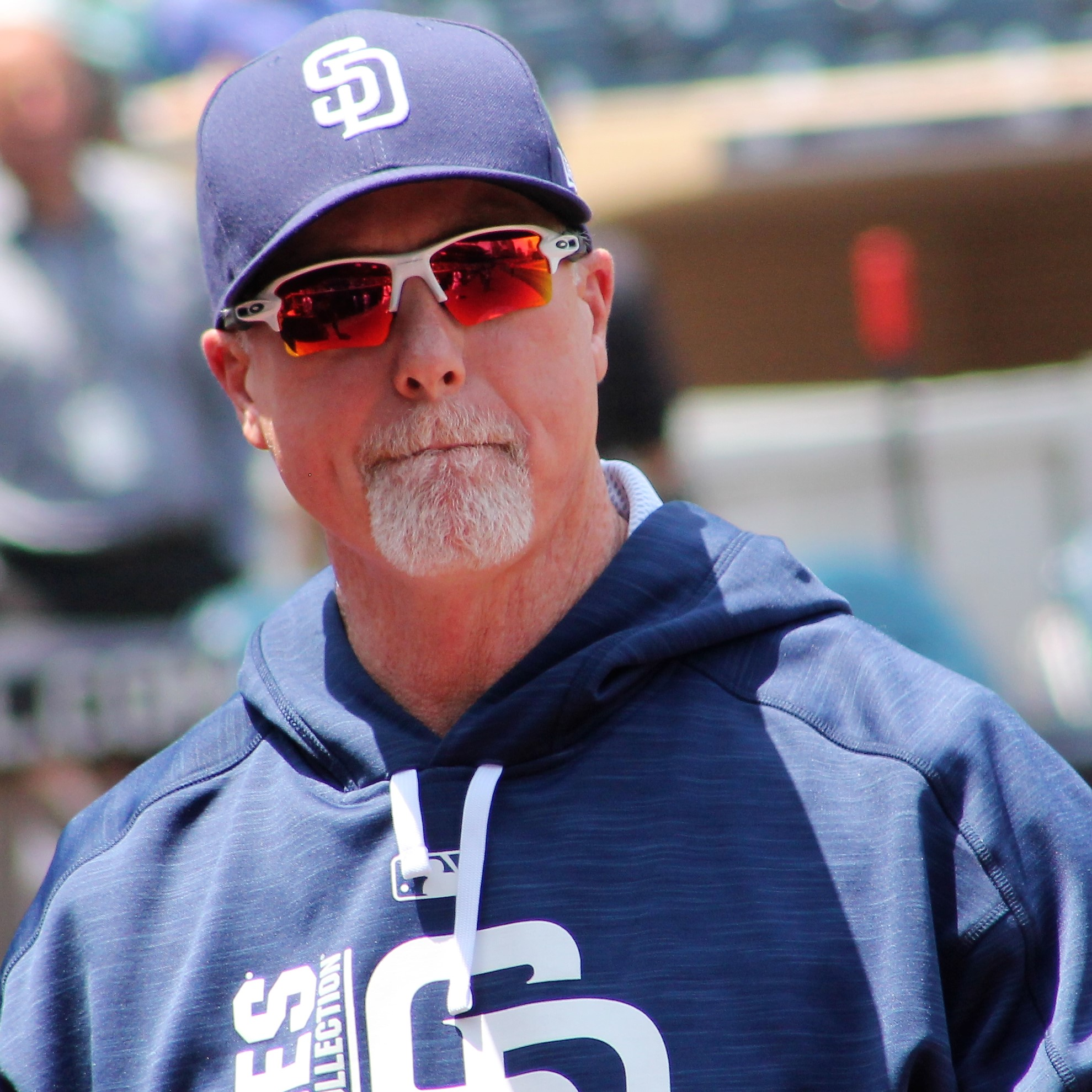
McGwire as coach for the San Diego Padres in 2011

=== San Diego Padres (2016–2018) ===
On December 2, 2015, McGwire was named as the bench coach for the San Diego Padres. He left the team after the 2018 season.

On February 6, 2026, the Athletics hired McGwire as a special assistant in their player development department.

== Honors, records and achievements ==
Known as one of the top sluggers of his era, McGwire ended his career with 583 home runs, which was fifth-most in history when he retired. When he hit his 500th career home run in 1999, he did so in 5,487 career at-bats, the fewest in major league history. He led all of MLB in home runs in five different seasons: 1987 and each season from 1996 to 1999. His total of 245 home runs from 1996 to 1999 is the highest four-season home-run output in major league history. In each of those four seasons, he exceeded 50 home runs, becoming the first player to do so. He was also the first player to hit 49 or more home runs five times, including his rookie-season record of 49 in 1987. With a career average of one home every 10.61 at-bats, he holds the MLB record for most home runs per at-bat, leading second-place Babe Ruth by more than a full at-bat (11.76).

As of 2025, McGwire owned three of the four lowest single-season AB/HR ratios in MLB history, which covered his 1996, 1998 and 1999 seasons; they were actually the top three seasons in MLB history until Bonds broke his single-season home-run record in 2001. McGwire's 1997 season ranked 14th, excluding Negro Leagues statistics. Considered one of the slowest runners in the game, McGwire hit only 6 triples, the second fewest of any player with at least 7,000 plate appearances. He had 12 stolen bases while being caught stealing eight times. His 1,626 hits is the lowest for all members of the 500 home run club.

=== Honors and distinctions ===
McGwire was recognized as The Sporting News Sportsman of the Year in 1997 and again in 1998, the latter shared with Sammy Sosa. He also shared the 1998 Sports Illustrated Sportsman of the Year award with Sosa, and was named the Associated Press Athlete of the Year that year. In a 1999 list of the 100 greatest baseball players, The Sporting News ranked McGwire at number 91. The list had been compiled during the 1998 season and included statistics through the 1997 season. That year, he was elected to the Major League Baseball All-Century Team. In 2005, The Sporting News published an update of its list with McGwire at number 84.

A five-mile stretch of Interstate 70 in Missouri near Busch Stadium was named Mark McGwire Highway to honor his 70-home-run achievement, along with his various good works for the city. In May 2010, St. Louis politicians succeeded in passing a state bill to change the name to Mark Twain Highway.

=== National Baseball Hall of Fame consideration ===
McGwire first became eligible for Hall of Fame voting in 2007. For election, a player needs to be listed on 75% of ballots cast; falling under 5% removes a player from future consideration. Between 2007 and 2010, McGwire's performance held steady, receiving 128 votes (23.5%) in 2007, 128 votes (23.6%) in 2008, 118 votes (21.9%) in 2009, and 128 votes (23.7%) in 2010. The 2011 ballot resulted in his first sub-20% total of 115 votes (19.8%), and McGwire's total votes continued to decline (112 votes (19.5%) in 2012, 96 votes (16.9%) in 2013, 63 votes (11.0%) in 2014 and 55 votes (10.0%) in 2015) until he was eliminated after receiving 54 votes (12.3%) in 2016.

A second path for entering the Hall of Fame is through the Hall's "Era Committees" structure, formerly known as the Veterans Committee, which may consider retired players whose eligibility has fallen outside of the traditional 10-year ballot period. Entry into the Hall of Fame requires a "yes" vote from 12 of the 16 committee members. McGwire was not on the ballot for Contemporary Baseball Era players in 2022 or for the one in 2025.

=== Records ===
MLB and team records
Accomplishment	Record	Date(s)	Refs
Major League Baseball records
Fewest at-bats to 500 career home runs	5,487	1999	
Fewest career at bats per home run	10.6		
Home runs in a four-season period	245	1996–1999	
Consecutive 50-HR seasons	4^{†}	1996–1999	
50-HR seasons	4^{††}	1996–1999	
Consecutive 60-HR seasons	2^{†}	1998–1999	
Home runs in a two-season period	135	1998–1999	
Single-season highest RBI/H ratio	1.014	1999	
Oakland Athletics records
Lowest career AB/HR ratio	12.1		
Career HR	363		
Lowest single-season AB/HR ratio	8.1	1995, 1996	
St. Louis Cardinals records
Lowest career AB/HR ratio	7.9		
Highest career OPS	1.222		
Highest career OPS+	180		
Highest career SLG	.683		
Lowest single-season AB/HR ratio	7.3	1998	
Most HR in a season	70	1998	
Most times on base in a season	320	1998	
Most bases on balls in a season	162	1998	

† – tied with Sammy Sosa

†† – tied with Babe Ruth and Sammy Sosa

=== Playing career totals ===
In 16 seasons playing major league baseball (1986–2001), McGwire accumulated the following career totals:

- G 1,874
- ABs 6,187
- Runs 1,167
- Hits 1,626
- Doubles 252
- Triples 6
- HR 583
- RBI 1,414
- GIDP 147
- BB 1,317
- IBB 150
- HBP 75
- SH 3
- SF 78
- Strikeouts 1,596
- SBs 12
- CS 8
- BA .263
- OBP .394
- SLG .588
- OPS .982
- OPS+ 162

== Steroid use ==
In a 1998 article by Associated Press writer Steve Wilstein, McGwire admitted to taking androstenedione, an over-the-counter muscle enhancement product that had already been banned by the NFL, and the IOC; however, use of the substance was not prohibited by Major League Baseball at the time, and it was not federally classified as an anabolic steroid in the United States until 2004.

Jose Canseco released a book, Juiced: Wild Times, Rampant 'Roids, Smash Hits & How Baseball Got Big, in 2005. In it, he wrote positively about steroids and made various claims—among them, that McGwire had used performance-enhancing drugs since the 1980s and that Canseco had personally injected him with them.

In 2005, McGwire and Canseco were among 11 baseball players and executives subpoenaed to testify at a congressional hearing on steroids. During his testimony on March 17, 2005, McGwire declined to answer questions under oath when he appeared before the House Government Reform Committee. In a tearful opening statement, McGwire said:

Asking me or any other player to answer questions about who took steroids in front of television cameras will not solve the problem. If a player answers 'No,' he simply will not be believed; if he answers 'Yes,' he risks public scorn and endless government investigations ... My lawyers have advised me that I cannot answer these questions without jeopardizing my friends, my family, and myself. I will say, however, that it remains a fact in this country that a man, any man, should be regarded as innocent unless proven guilty.

On January 11, 2010, in an interview with Bob Costas, McGwire admitted to using steroids on and off for a decade and said, "I wish I had never touched steroids. It was foolish and it was a mistake. I truly apologize. Looking back, I wish I had never played during the steroid era." He admitted using them in the 1989/90 offseason and then after he was injured in 1993. He admitted using them on occasion throughout the 1990s, including during the 1998 season. McGwire said that he used steroids to recover from injuries.

McGwire's decision to admit using steroids was prompted by his decision to become hitting coach of the St. Louis Cardinals. According to McGwire, he took steroids for health reasons rather than to improve performance.

Despite his admission of steroid use, McGwire was criticized for refusing to acknowledge that his record-setting home run output in the late 1990s was aided by steroids. Bob Costas said he was "surprised" that although he gave McGwire multiple opportunities to do so, McGwire was never able to make this admission. Costas said:

I kept trying to gently suggest that, couldn't you see that even though you were a powerful hitter...couldn't you see that you were even better than you had been? Couldn't you see the cluster of Sammy Sosa seasons, Barry Bonds seasons, guys with 18 home runs all of a sudden hitting 45 home runs, can't you see a correlation here? And he could never acknowledge it. I don't think he's being consciously dishonest, I think he's convinced that that is the truth [that he would have hit the same number of home runs with or without steroids]. But at least he's acknowledged something [taking steroids]. Almost nobody else has acknowledged it.

== Personal life ==
McGwire's brother Dan McGwire was a quarterback for the Seattle Seahawks and Miami Dolphins of the NFL in the early 1990s and was a first-round draft pick out of San Diego State University. He has another brother, Jay McGwire, a bodybuilder, who wrote a book in 2010 detailing their shared steroid use.

McGwire married Stephanie Slemera, a former pharmaceutical sales representative from the St. Louis area, in Las Vegas on April 20, 2002. On June 1, 2010, their triplet daughters Monet Rose, Marlo Rose, and Monroe Rose were born. They joined brothers Max and Mason. Mason was drafted by the Chicago Cubs in the eighth round of the 2022 MLB draft to be a pitcher. Max, a pitcher and first baseman, signed a minor league deal with the Athletics organization on July 31, 2026, after playing college baseball for the Oklahoma Sooners, San Diego Toreros, and Saint Louis Billikens. They reside in a gated community in Shady Canyon, Irvine, California. Together they created the Mark McGwire Foundation for Children to support agencies that help children who have been sexually and physically abused come to terms with a difficult childhood. Mark has a son, Matthew (b. 1987), from his previous marriage to Kathlene Hughes from 1984 to 1990.

Prior to admitting to using steroids, McGwire avoided the media and spent much of his free time playing golf. He also worked as a hitting coach for major league players Matt Holliday, Bobby Crosby, Chris Duncan, and Skip Schumaker.

McGwire appeared as himself in season 7, episode 13 of the TV show Mad About You. McGwire provided his voice for a 1999 episode of The Simpsons titled "Brother's Little Helper", where he played himself.

== See also ==
- 1998 Major League Baseball home run record chase
- At bats per home run
- List of doping cases in sport
- List of Major League Baseball home run records
- List of Major League Baseball career bases on balls leaders
- List of Major League Baseball career extra base hits leaders
- List of Major League Baseball career home run leaders
- List of Major League Baseball career OPS leaders
- List of Major League Baseball career runs scored leaders
- List of Major League Baseball career runs batted in leaders
- List of Major League Baseball career strikeouts by batters leaders
- List of Major League Baseball career slugging percentage leaders
- List of St. Louis Cardinals team records
- Major League Baseball titles leaders
- St. Louis Cardinals award winners and league leaders
- List of most valuable celebrity memorabilia

Awards and achievements
Preceded by Mo Vaughn	American League Player of the Month; June 1996	Succeeded by Juan González
Preceded by Mike Piazza; Jeff Kent; Jeromy Burnitz	National League Player of the Month; September 1997—May 1998; September 1998; July 1999	Succeeded by Sammy Sosa; Matt Williams; Vladimir Guerrero
Preceded by Roger Maris	Single season home run record holder 1998—2000	Succeeded by Barry Bonds
Preceded by Larry Walker	National League Slugging Percentage Champion; 1998	Succeeded by Larry Walker
Preceded by Steve Finley	Two or more 3-home run games in a season 1998	Succeeded by Jeff Bagwell

Sporting positions
Preceded by Hal McRae	St. Louis Cardinals Hitting Coach; 2010–2012	Succeeded by John Mabry
Preceded by Dave Hansen	Los Angeles Dodgers Hitting Coach; 2013–2015	Succeeded by Turner Ward
Preceded by Dave Roberts	San Diego Padres Bench Coach; 2016–2018	Succeeded by TBA
