= Kozo Shoda =

Japanese baseball player and coach (born 1962)

- Infielder / Coach
- Born: January 2, 1962; Wakayama, Wakayama, Japan
- Batted: Both Threw: Right

NPB debut
- May 22, 1985, for the Hiroshima Toyo Carp

Last appearance
- September 29, 1998, for the Hiroshima Toyo Carp

NPB statistics (through 1998)
- Batting average: .287
- Hits: 1546
- Home runs: 44
- Runs batted in: 875
- Stolen base: 146
- Stats at Baseball Reference

Teams
- As player: Hiroshima Toyo Carp (1985–1998); As coach: Hiroshima Toyo Carp (1998–1999); Osaka Kintetsu Buffaloes (2000–2004); Hanshin Tigers (2005–2007); SK Wyverns (2009); Orix Buffaloes (2010–2011); Hanwha Eagles (2015–2016); Kia Tigers (2017–2019)

Career highlights and awards
- 2× Central League batting champion (1987, 1988); 2× Central League Best Nine Award (1988, 1989); 5× Central League Golden Glove Award (1987–1991); 5× NPB All-Star (1987–1990, 1993); NPB All-Star Game MVP (1988 Game3)
Medals
Men's baseball
Representing Japan
Olympics
Gold medal – first place	1984 Los Angeles	Team competition

Kozo Shoda (正田 耕三, Shoda Kozo; born January 2, 1962) is a Japanese former Nippon Professional Baseball infielder.
