= Akimitsu Itoh =

Japanese baseball player and coach

- Pitcher / Coach
- Born: April 2, 1963; Edogawa, Tokyo, Japan
- Batted: Right Threw: Right

NPB debut
- April 6, 1986, for the Yakult Swallows

Last appearance
- October 8, 1998, for the Yakult Swallows

NPB statistics
- Win–loss record: 87–76
- Earned run average: 4.01
- Strikeouts: 632
- Saves: 21
- Stats at Baseball Reference

Teams
- As player: Tokyo Yakult Swallows (1986–1998); As coach: Yakult Swallows / Tokyo Yakult Swallows (1999–2007, 2011–2015)

Career highlights and awards
- Central League wins champion (1988); Comeback Player of the Year (1992); NPB All-Star (1988); 3× Japan Series champion (1993, 1995, 1997)
Medals
Men's baseball
Representing Japan
Olympics
| Gold medal – first place | 1984 Los Angeles | Team competition |

Akimitsu Itoh (伊東 昭光, Itoh Akimitsu; born April 2, 1963) is a Japanese former Nippon Professional Baseball pitcher.
