= Oddibe McDowell =

American baseball player (born 1962)

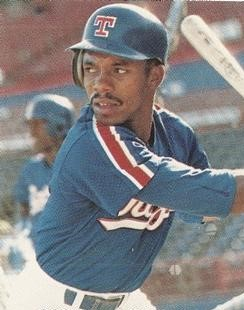
- Center fielder
- Born: August 25, 1962 (age 64); Hollywood, Florida, U.S.
- Batted: Left Threw: Left

MLB debut
- May 19, 1985, for the Texas Rangers

Last MLB appearance
- August 10, 1994, for the Texas Rangers

MLB statistics
- Batting average: .253
- Home runs: 74
- Runs batted in: 266
- Stats at Baseball Reference

Teams
- Texas Rangers (1985–1988); Cleveland Indians (1989); Atlanta Braves (1989–1990); Texas Rangers (1994)

Career highlights and awards
- Golden Spikes Award (1984)

Member of the College

Baseball Hall of Fame
- Induction: 2011
Medals
Men's baseball
Representing the United States
Olympic Games
Silver medal – second place	1984 Los Angeles	Team
World Games
Gold medal – first place	1981 Santa Clara	Team

Oddibe McDowell (born August 25, 1962) is an American former center fielder in Major League Baseball (MLB) who played from 1985 to 1994 for the Texas Rangers, Cleveland Indians, and Atlanta Braves.

== Amateur baseball ==
McDowell was a multi-sport athlete at McArthur High School in Hollywood, Florida and won the Florida High School Activities Association Class 4A wrestling championship at 155 pounds in 1979.

McDowell won the Golden Spikes Award, given annually to the best amateur baseball player, in 1984 while playing college baseball at Arizona State University (ASU). He wore uniform number 0 at ASU; ASU inducted McDowell to the university's athletic hall of fame in 1991 and has retired his number.

In 1981, McDowell won a gold medal as a member of the United States national team in the World Games and Intercontinental Cup. He was also a member of the 1984 Olympic Team that won a silver medal, hitting three home runs in the tournament.

== Professional baseball ==
The Texas Rangers selected McDowell in the first round of the 1984 Major League Baseball draft. He stood out during his first stint with the Texas Rangers by wearing the very unusual uniform number 0. He wore the number 20 with the Indians, the number 1 with the Braves, and during his second time with the Rangers, he wore number 8.

McDowell was the first player to hit for the cycle for the Rangers, doing so on July 23, 1985, in a Rangers' 8–4 victory over the Indians at Arlington Stadium. McDowell finished 4th in the American League Rookie of the Year voting for 1985.

The Rangers traded McDowell to Cleveland after a disappointing 1988 season. In 1993, McDowell signed with the Rangers minor league affiliate Tulsa Drillers and his play there earned him a spring training invitation from the Rangers.

Through June 16, 2009, McDowell was tied for second of all Rangers players ever in career leadoff home runs, one behind the nine leadoff homers by Ian Kinsler.

His first name is pronounced "owed a bee" or "oh-ta-bee."

== Post-playing career ==
McDowell was inducted to the National College Baseball Hall of Fame in 2011.

Between February 2011 and March 2012, Deadspin ran a series of 14 articles, which published McDowell's monthly water bill and the amount owed; until that time, water bills were publicly accessible on the Broward County Waste and Wastewater Services department's website. Writing for New Times Broward-Palm Beach, Michael J. Mooney described the series as Dadaist and evidence of "the power of mass appeal and of interactive media."

As of 2026, McDowell is in his 12th year as the head coach for the McArthur High School varsity baseball team in Hollywood, Florida.

== See also ==
- List of Major League Baseball career stolen bases leaders
- List of Major League Baseball players to hit for the cycle

Achievements
Preceded by Keith Hernandez	Hitting for the cycle July 23, 1985	Succeeded by Rich Gedman
