= Baseball at the 1984 Summer Olympics =

Demonstration sport

Tournament details
- Country: United States
- Cities: Los Angeles, California
- Dates: July 31 – August 7, 1984
- Teams: 8

Final positions
- Champions: Japan
- Runners-up: United States
- Third place: Chinese Taipei
- Fourth place: South Korea

Tournament statistics
- Games played: 16

Baseball at the 1984 Summer Olympics was a demonstration sport. It would become an official sport 8 years later at the 1992 Summer Olympics. Although single exhibition games had been played in conjunction with five previous Olympics, it was the first time that the sport was officially included in the program, and also the first time that the sport was played in Olympics held in the United States. Eight teams competed in Los Angeles, California, in the tournament. Games were held at Dodger Stadium. Cuba originally qualified but withdrew as a result of the Soviet-led boycott.

== Teams ==
Eight teams competed in the tournament.

- Canada – Invited
- Chinese Taipei – 1983 Asian Baseball Championship gold medalist, defeat Japan in a playoff
- Dominican Republic – 1983 Pan American Games Fourth place – Replaced Cuba as the highest Americas team
- Italy – 1983 European Baseball Championship gold medalist
- Japan – Invited
- South Korea – 1982 Amateur World Series gold medalist
- Nicaragua – 1983 Pan American Games silver medalist
- United States – Host nation

== Venue ==
Los Angeles	Dodger Stadium (the Los Angeles metropolitan area)
Dodger Stadium	Dodger Stadium (the Los Angeles metropolitan area)
Capacity: 56,000	Dodger Stadium (the Los Angeles metropolitan area)

== Preliminary round ==
There were two pools for the preliminary round. Teams played each of the three other teams in their division.

=== White Division ===
Pos	Team	Pld	W	L	RF	RA	RD	PCT	GB	Qualification
1	United States (H)	3	3	0	30	2	+28	1.000	—	Advance to knockout round
2	Chinese Taipei	3	2	1	24	3	+21	.667	1	Advance to knockout round
3	Italy	3	1	2	11	33	−22	.333	2	
4	Dominican Republic	3	0	3	8	35	−27	.000	3	

(H) Hosts

31 July; Game 1	Italy	10–7	Dominican Republic	Dodger Stadium

31 July; Game 2	Chinese Taipei	1–2	United States	Dodger Stadium

2 August; Game 5	Dominican Republic	1–13	Chinese Taipei	Dodger Stadium

2 August; Game 6	United States	16–1	Italy	Dodger Stadium

4 August; Game 9	Dominican Republic	0–12	United States	Dodger Stadium

4 August; Game 10	Italy	0–10	Chinese Taipei	Dodger Stadium

=== Blue Division ===
Pos	Team	Pld	W	L	RF	RA	RD	PCT	GB	Qualification
1	Japan	3	2	1	25	7	+18	.667	—	Advance to knockout round
2	South Korea	3	2	1	10	9	+1	.667	—	Advance to knockout round
3	Nicaragua	3	1	2	11	29	−18	.333	1	
4	Canada	3	1	2	10	11	−1	.333	1	

1 August; Game 3	Canada	3–4 (F/12)	Nicaragua	Dodger Stadium

1 August; Game 4	Japan	2–0	South Korea	Dodger Stadium

3 August; Game 7	South Korea	3–1	Canada	Dodger Stadium

3 August; Game 8	Nicaragua	1–19	Japan	Dodger Stadium

5 August; Game 11	Canada	6–4	Japan	Dodger Stadium

5 August; Game 12	Nicaragua	6–7	South Korea	Dodger Stadium

== Knockout round ==
Semi-finals
6 August – Dodger Stadium (F/10)
Chinese Taipei	1
Japan	2
6 August – Dodger Stadium
South Korea	2
United States	5

Final
7 August – Dodger Stadium
Japan	6
United States	3
Third place
7 August – Dodger Stadium (F/14)
Chinese Taipei	3
South Korea	0

=== Semifinals ===
The semifinals pitted the first-place team of each division against the second-place team of the other division. Thus, the United States (3–0) played against Korea (2–1), which had a tied record with Japan (2–1) but had lost in head-to-head competition against them. The first-place Japanese played against Chinese Taipei (2–1).

6 August; Game 13	Chinese Taipei	1–2 (F/10)	Japan	Dodger Stadium

6 August; Game 14	South Korea	2–5	United States	Dodger Stadium

=== Third-place final ===
The third-place final pitted the losers of the semifinals against each, with the winner taking third place and the loser taking fourth.

7 August; Game 15	Chinese Taipei	3–0 (F/14)	South Korea	Dodger Stadium

=== First-place final ===
Since baseball was a demonstration sport, no official medals were awarded. The winners of the semifinals played each other for first and second place, with the Japanese team prevailing, 6–3.

7 August; Game 16	Japan	6–3	United States	Dodger Stadium

== Statistical leaders ==
=== Batting ===
Statistic	Name	Total/Avg
Batting average*	3 tied with (Note: Yukio Arai (JPN), Roberto Bianchi (ITA), Arnoldo Munoz (NCA))	.500
Hits	(Japan) Yukio Arai	11
Runs	(Japan) Kozo Shoda	7
Home runs	3 tied with (Note: Will Clark (USA), Oddibe McDowell (USA), Katsumi Hirosawa (JPN))	3
Runs batted in	(Japan) Katsumi Hirosawa	9
Strikeouts	(South Korea) Soon-chul Lee	13
Stolen bases	(Chinese Taipei) Fu-lien Wu	4
Walks	(Japan) Kozo Shoda	5

* Minimum 10 plate appearances

=== Pitching ===
Statistic	Name	Total/Avg
Wins	(Japan) Akimitsu Ito (Chinese Taipei) Fu-ming Tu	2
Saves	3 tied with (Note: Akimitsu Ito (JPN), Yukio Yoshida (JPN), Mark Wooden (CAN))	1
Innings pitched	(Chinese Taipei) Sheng-Hsiung Chuang	21 1/3
Hits allowed	(Nicaragua) Julio Moya	20
Runs allowed	(Dominican Republic) Secundina Lora	9
Earned runs allowed	(Dominican Republic) Secundina Lora	8
Earned run average*	(Chinese Taipei) Sheng-Hsiung Chuang	0.00
Walks	(United States) John Hoover	8
Strikeouts	(Chinese Taipei) Sheng-Hsiung Chuang	6
Complete games	3 tied with (Note: John Hoover (USA), Tai-yan Kuo (TPE), Julio Moya (NCA))	1

* Minimum 9 innings pitched
