= 1987 Pittsburgh Pirates season =

1987 Pittsburgh Pirates
- League: National League
- Division: East
- Ballpark: Three Rivers Stadium
- City: Pittsburgh, Pennsylvania
- Record: 80–82 (.494)
- Divisional place: 4th (tie)
- Owners: Pittsburgh Associates
- General managers: Syd Thrift
- Managers: Jim Leyland
- Television: KDKA-TV (Lanny Frattare, Jim Rooker, John Sanders); Pirates Cable Network (Steve Blass, Mike Lange)
- Radio: KDKA-AM (Lanny Frattare, Jim Rooker)

The 1987 Pittsburgh Pirates season was the 106th season of the Pittsburgh Pirates franchise; and their 101st season in the National League. This was their 18th season at Three Rivers Stadium. The Pirates finished fifth in the National League East with a record of 80–82.

== Regular season ==
=== Season standings ===
NL East
Team	W	L	Pct.	GB	Home	Road
St. Louis Cardinals	95	67	.586	—	49‍–‍32	46‍–‍35
New York Mets	92	70	.568	3	49‍–‍32	43‍–‍38
Montreal Expos	91	71	.562	4	48‍–‍33	43‍–‍38
Philadelphia Phillies	80	82	.494	15	43‍–‍38	37‍–‍44
Pittsburgh Pirates	80	82	.494	15	47‍–‍34	33‍–‍48
Chicago Cubs	76	85	.472	18½	40‍–‍40	36‍–‍45

=== Game log ===
1987 Game Log: 80–82 (Home: 47–34; Away: 33–48)
April: 8–11 (Home: 6–7; Away: 2–4)

#	Date	Opponent	Score	Win	Loss	Save	Attendance	Record
1	April 7	@ Mets	2–3	Ojeda	**Patterson** (0–1)	Orosco	46,102	0–1
2	April 9	@ Mets	2–4	Walter	**Easley** (0–1)	Orosco	20,598	0–2
3	April 10	Cardinals	4–3	**Robinson** (1–0)	LaPoint	—	52,119	1–2
4	April 11	Cardinals	3–6	Forsch	**Kipper** (0–1)	Worrell	6,720	1–3
5	April 12	Cardinals	7–4	**Patterson** (1–1)	Tudor	**Robinson** (1)	6,749	2–3
6	April 13	Cardinals	4–8	Cox	**Drabek** (0–1)	Horton	5,182	2–4
7	April 15	@ Cubs	3–1 (10)	**Robinson** (2–0)	Noles	—	5,369	3–4
8	April 16	@ Cubs	6–0	**Kipper** (1–1)	Lynch	—	6,956	4–4
9	April 17	Phillies	2–6 (10)	Bedrosian	**Jones** (0–1)	—	10,105	4–5
10	April 18	Phillies	6–8	Tekulve	**Robinson** (2–1)	—	19,361	4–6
11	April 19	Phillies	5–2	**Drabek** (1–1)	Ruffin	**Robinson** (2)	7,962	5–6
12	April 20	Mets	9–6	**Easley** (1–1)	Myers	—	8,267	6–6
13	April 21	Mets	6–9	Ojeda	**Kipper** (1–2)	Orosco	13,368	6–7
14	April 22	Mets	7–8	Darling	**Patterson** (1–2)	Orosco	13,911	6–8
15	April 25	@ Phillies	2–3	Carman	**Drabek** (1–2)	Tekulve	18,553	6–9
16	April 26	@ Phillies	4–6	Ruffin	**Reuschel** (0–1)	Bedrosian	30,234	6–10
17	April 28	Dodgers	6–1	**Kipper** (2–2)	Valenzuela	**Easley** (1)	3,420	7–10
18	April 29	Dodgers	2–10	Welch	**Patterson** (1–3)	—	4,668	7–11
19	April 30	Dodgers	5–4	**Smiley** (1–0)	Hershiser	**Robinson** (3)	7,114	8–11

May: 13–14 (Home: 8–6; Away: 5–8)

#	Date	Opponent	Score	Win	Loss	Save	Attendance	Record
20	May 1	Giants	4–2	**Reuschel** (1–1)	Davis	—	10,651	9–11
21	May 2	Giants	1–0	**Smiley** (2–0)	Downs	**Robinson** (4)	14,736	10–11
22	May 4	@ Padres	5–9	Davis	**Patterson** (1–4)	McCullers	22,306	10–12
23	May 5	@ Padres	10–8	**Walk** (1–0)	Show	**Robinson** (5)	12,642	11–12
24	May 6	@ Dodgers	1–2	Hershiser	**Reuschel** (1–2)	—	32,789	11–13
25	May 7	@ Dodgers	3–6	Honeycutt	**Kipper** (2–3)	Young	27,621	11–14
26	May 8	@ Giants	2–4	Downs	**Fisher** (0–1)	Garrelts	17,985	11–15
27	May 9	@ Giants	4–9	Hammaker	**Walk** (1–1)	—	17,609	11–16
28	May 10	@ Giants	4–1 (11)	**Robinson** (3–1)	Garrelts	—	29,652	12–16
29	May 12	Padres	12–5	**Reuschel** (2–2)	Hawkins	—	5,744	13–16
30	May 13	Padres	9–5	**Walk** (2–1)	Lefferts	**Robinson** (6)	7,916	14–16
31	May 14	Padres	10–3	**Fisher** (1–1)	Show	**Smiley** (1)	5,592	15–16
32	May 15	Braves	3–9	Assenmacher	**Pena** (0–1)	—	18,137	15–17
33	May 16	Braves	8–10	Dedmon	**Smiley** (2–1)	Garber	16,939	15–18
34	May 17	Braves	6–5	**Robinson** (4–1)	Olwine	—	26,469	16–18
35	May 18	Astros	1–4	Scott	**Kipper** (2–4)	—	4,213	16–19
36	May 19	Astros	5–2	**Smiley** (3–1)	Meads	**Robinson** (7)	6,238	17–19
37	May 20	Astros	5–3	**Taylor** (1–0)	Darwin	**Pena** (1)	14,096	18–19
38	May 22	@ Reds	4–1	**Reuschel** (3–2)	Robinson	**Smiley** (2)	25,678	19–19
39	May 23	@ Reds	3–2	**Kipper** (3–4)	Pacillo	**Robinson** (8)	33,887	20–19
40	May 24	@ Reds	7–2	**Fisher** (2–1)	Browning	—	30,082	21–19
41	May 25	@ Astros	2–7	Deshaies	**Taylor** (1–1)	—	9,618	21–20
42	May 26	@ Astros	3–10	Meads	**Pena** (0–2)	—	9,632	21–21
43	May 27	@ Astros	2–7	Lopez	**Robinson** (4–3)	Smith	14,863	21–22
44	May 29	Reds	6–13	Hoffman	**Kipper** (3–5)	—	26,835	21–23
45	May 30	Reds	2–6	Gullickson	**Taylor** (1–2)	—	28,853	21–24
46	May 31	Reds	2–5	Power	**Drabek** (1–3)	Franco	24,786	21–25

June: 13–17 (Home: 5–4; Away: 8–13)

#	Date	Opponent	Score	Win	Loss	Save	Attendance	Record
47	June 2	@ Braves	4–1	**Reuschel** (4–2)	Mahler	—	8,890	22–25
48	June 3	@ Braves	4–1	**Kipper** (4–5)	Palmer	—	5,368	23–25
49	June 4	@ Braves	3–8	Smith	**Fisher** (2–2)	Dedmon	6,460	23–26
50	June 5	@ Mets	1–5	Gooden	**Dunne** (0–1)	Orosco	51,402	23–27
51	June 6	@ Mets	2–4	Fernandez	**Drabek** (1–4)	McDowell	47,603	23–28
52	June 7	@ Mets	4–5 (10)	McDowell	**Robinson** (4–4)	—		23–29
53	June 7	@ Mets	10–9	**Taylor** (2–2)	McDowell	**Robinson** (9)	42,516	24–29
54	June 8	@ Expos	1–7	Heaton	**Fisher** (2–3)	—	11,973	24–30
55	June 9	@ Expos	8–1	**Dunne** (1–1)	Sorensen	—	13,132	25–30
56	June 10	@ Expos	3–4 (11)	McClure	**Robinson** (4–5)	—	10,134	25–31
57	June 12	Mets	2–10	Fernandez	**Reuschel** (4–3)	—	27,465	25–32
58	June 13	Mets	4–3	**Robinson** (5–5)	Myers	—	26,894	26–32
59	June 14	Mets	3–7	Sisk	**Fisher** (2–4)	—	30,477	26–33
60	June 15	@ Cardinals	3–1	**Dunne** (2–1)	Mathews	—	30,887	27–33
61	June 16	@ Cardinals	1–11	Dawley	**Drabek** (1–5)	Horton	27,048	27–34
62	June 17	@ Cardinals	4–1	**Reuschel** (5–3)	Forsch	—	30,891	28–34
63	June 18	@ Cardinals	6–8 (10)	Dawley	**Robinson** (5–6)	—	35,264	28–35
64	June 19	@ Cubs	4–0	**Fisher** (3–4)	Noles	—	33,529	29–35
65	June 20	@ Cubs	8–2	**Dunne** (3–1)	Maddux	—	34,384	30–35
66	June 21	@ Cubs	3–6	Trout	**Drabek** (1–6)	Smith	33,418	30–36
67	June 22	@ Cubs	2–3	Moyer	**Reuschel** (5–4)	—	27,064	30–37
68	June 23	Expos	2–8	Heaton	**Kipper** (4–6)	Parrett	9,276	30–38
69	June 24	Expos	9–6	**Fisher** (4–4)	Fischer	—	21,564	31–38
70	June 25	Expos	2–7	Martinez	**Dunne** (3–2)	McGaffigan	10,836	31–39
71	June 26	Cubs	5–2	**Jones** (1–1)	Maddux	**Robinson** (10)	20,408	32–39
72	June 27	Cubs	7–0	**Reuschel** (6–4)	Moyer	—	31,595	33–39
73	June 28	Cubs	6–2	**Jones** (2–1)	Sutcliffe	—	25,304	34–39
74	June 29	@ Phillies	5–6	Jackson	**Jones** (2–2)	Bedrosian		34–40
75	June 29	@ Phillies	3–11	Bair	**Dunne** (3–3)	Ritchie	30,046	34–41
76	June 30	@ Phillies	4–6	Gross	**Drabek** (1–7)	Bedrosian	20,598	34–42

July: 11–15 (Home: 5–8; Away: 6–7)

#	Date	Opponent	Score	Win	Loss	Save	Attendance	Record
77	July 1	@ Phillies	4–11	Rawley	**Taylor** (2–3)	—	19,977	34–43
78	July 3	Dodgers	6–0	**Reuschel** (7–4)	Valenzuela	—	22,454	35–43
79	July 4	Dodgers	4–2	**Kipper** (5–6)	Welch	**Robinson** (11)	12,935	36–43
80	July 5	Dodgers	1–6	Hershiser	**Fisher** (4–5)	Young	13,438	36–44
81	July 6	Giants	5–7	Dravecky	**Dunne** (3–4)	Garrelts		36–45
82	July 6	Giants	4–7	LaCoss	**Drabek** (1–8)	Lefferts	11,204	36–46
83	July 7	Giants	6–4 (12)	**Gideon** (1–0)	Price	—	7,027	37–46
84	July 8	Giants	4–8 (14)	Robinson	**Gideon** (1–1)	—	10,868	37–47
85	July 10	Padres	6–5 (11)	**Robinson** (7–6)	Gossage	—	13,109	38–47
86	July 11	Padres	1–3	Grant	**Fisher** (4–6)	Davis	27,476	38–48
87	July 12	Padres	4–2	**Dunne** (4–4)	Show	**Gideon** (1)	13,276	39–48
88	July 16	@ Dodgers	0–7	Valenzuela	**Kipper** (5–7)	—	32,845	39–49
89	July 17	@ Dodgers	2–3 (10)	Young	**Robinson** (7–7)	—	28,466	39–50
90	July 18	@ Dodgers	4–2	**Drabek** (2–8)	Hershiser	**Jones** (1)	34,864	40–50
91	July 19	@ Dodgers	7–2	**Dunne** (5–4)	Honeycutt	**Smiley** (3)	37,548	41–50
92	July 20	@ Giants	7–6	**Fisher** (5–6)	LaCoss	**Robinson** (12)	6,919	42–50
93	July 21	@ Giants	0–7	Dravecky	**Kipper** (5–8)	—	8,382	42–51
94	July 22	@ Giants	4–0	**Reuschel** (8–4)	Downs	—	14,472	43–51
95	July 23	@ Padres	1–2	Show	**Drabek** (2–9)	Gossage	14,911	43–52
96	July 24	@ Padres	3–2	**Dunne** (6–4)	Jones	**Gideon** (2)	17,136	44–52
97	July 25	@ Padres	9–3	**Fisher** (6–6)	Hawkins	—	19,764	45–52
98	July 26	@ Padres	4–7	Whitson	**Kipper** (5–9)	—	13,219	45–53
99	July 28	Phillies	2–5	Rawley	**Reuschel** (8–5)	—	16,270	45–54
100	July 29	Phillies	3–4	Carman	**Drabek** (2–10)	Bedrosian	28,392	45–55
101	July 30	Phillies	0–1	Ruffin	**Smiley** (3–2)	Bedrosian	11,769	45–56
102	July 31	@ Cardinals	3–4	Dayley	**Jones** (2–4)	—	38,757	45–57

August: 15–14 (Home: 13–4; Away: 2–10)

#	Date	Opponent	Score	Win	Loss	Save	Attendance	Record
103	August 1	@ Cardinals	6–7 (10)	Worrell	**Jones** (2–5)	—	47,106	45–58
104	August 2	@ Cardinals	1–9	Magrane	**Pena** (0–3)	—	44,695	45–59
105	August 3	Cubs	6–4	**Drabek** (3–10)	Maddux	**Gott** (1)	7,281	46–59
106	August 4	Cubs	2–3 (11)	Mason	**Gideon** (1–2)	—	8,744	46–60
107	August 5	Cubs	10–0	**Fisher** (7–6)	Moyer	—	7,726	47–60
108	August 6	Expos	3–6	Parrett	**Gott** (0–1)	Burke	7,755	47–61
109	August 7	Expos	9–3	**Walk** (3–1)	Sebra	**Gideon** (3)	22,075	48–61
110	August 8	Expos	5–2	**Drabek** (4–10)	Smith	**Smiley** (4)	18,285	49–61
111	August 9	Expos	4–3	**Dunne** (7–4)	Parrett	**Gott** (2)	18,829	50–61
112	August 10	Cardinals	0–6	Forsch	**Fisher** (7–7)	—	11,445	50–62
113	August 11	Cardinals	5–6	Dayley	**Reuschel** (8–6)	Worrell	14,637	50–63
114	August 12	Cardinals	11–0	**Walk** (4–1)	Magrane	—	15,186	51–63
115	August 13	@ Expos	7–9	McGaffigan	**Gideon** (1–3)	McClure	23,609	51–64
116	August 14	@ Expos	3–4	McClure	**Smiley** (3–3)	—	20,501	51–65
117	August 15	@ Expos	3–6	Burke	**Fisher** (7–8)	—	23,894	51–66
118	August 16	@ Expos	7–10	Parrett	**Gideon** (1–4)	—	26,134	51–67
119	August 18	@ Reds	7–4	**Walk** (5–1)	Murphy	**Gott** (3)	29,385	52–67
120	August 19	@ Reds	10–9	**Drabek** (5–10)	Browning	—	24,179	53–67
121	August 20	@ Reds	3–5	Power	**Dunne** (7–5)	Franco	22,542	53–68
122	August 21	@ Braves	4–5	Smith	**Smiley** (3–4)	Olwine	15,783	53–69
123	August 22	@ Braves	3–10	Glavine	**Walk** (5–2)	—	22,173	53–70
124	August 23	@ Braves	2–6	Palmer	**Bielecki** (0–1)	—	10,699	53–71
125	August 24	Reds	5–4	**Drabek** (6–10)	Browning	**Gott** (4)	11,020	54–71
126	August 25	Reds	1–0	**Dunne** (8–5)	Power	—	10,149	55–71
127	August 26	Reds	6–5	**Robinson** (8–7)	Franco	—	13,722	56–71
128	August 28	Astros	4–2	**Walk** (6–2)	Scott	**Gott** (5)	11,917	57–71
129	August 29	Astros	8–2	**Bielecki** (1–1)	Ryan	—	26,585	58–71
130	August 30	Astros	7–0	**Drabek** (7–10)	Knepper	—	26,867	59–71
131	August 31	Braves	7–3	**Dunne** (9–5)	Dedmon	—	4,930	60–71

September: 16–11 (Home: 6–5; Away: 10–6)

#	Date	Opponent	Score	Win	Loss	Save	Attendance	Record
132	September 1	Braves	0–4	Smith	**Fisher** (7–9)	—	7,498	60–72
133	September 2	Braves	2–0	**Walk** (7–2)	Glavine	**Gott** (6)	6,259	61–72
134	September 4	@ Astros	0–2	Ryan	**Bielecki** (1–2)	Agosto	16,367	61–73
135	September 5	@ Astros	1–5	Knepper	**Drabek** (7–11)	—	27,887	61–74
136	September 6	@ Astros	4–3	**Dunne** (10–5)	Hernandez	**Gott** (7)	25,374	62–74
137	September 7	@ Cubs	3–2	**Fisher** (8–9)	Moyer	**Robinson** (13)	21,745	63–74
138	September 8	@ Cubs	4–1	**Palacios** (1–0)	Sutcliffe	**Gott** (8)	8,331	64–74
139	September 9	@ Cubs	4–3	**Robinson** (9–7)	Smith	**Gott** (9)	8,054	65–74
140	September 11	@ Phillies	4–2	**Drabek** (8–11)	Gross	**Gott** (10)	20,085	66–74
141	September 12	@ Phillies	12–4	**Dunne** (11–5)	Carman	—	15,440	67–74
142	September 13	@ Phillies	6–1	**Fisher** (9–9)	Ruffin	—	12,610	68–74
143	September 14	Expos	4–6 (14)	McGaffigan	**Gideon** (1–5)	Parrett	5,869	68–75
144	September 15	Expos	5–1	**Bielecki** (2–2)	Heaton	—	5,852	69–75
145	September 16	Cardinals	5–8	Tudor	**Drabek** (8–12)	—	15,323	69–76
146	September 17	Cardinals	1–0	**Dunne** (12–5)	Mathews	**Gott** (11)	5,640	70–76
147	September 18	Mets	10–9	**Smiley** (4–4)	Myers	**Gott** (12)	15,308	71–76
148	September 19	Mets	4–5	Aguilera	**Palacios** (1–1)	McDowell	20,933	71–77
149	September 20	Mets	9–8 (14)	**Smiley** (5–4)	Ojeda	—	19,122	72–77
150	September 21	@ Expos	5–2	**Drabek** (9–12)	Sebra	**Robinson** (14)	13,206	73–77
151	September 22	@ Expos	3–4	Perez	**Gott** (0–2)	Burke	16,407	73–78
152	September 23	@ Cardinals	2–0	**Fisher** (10–9)	Mathews	—	30,235	74–78
153	September 24	@ Cardinals	2–3	Horton	**Robinson** (9–8)	—	35,921	74–79
154	September 25	@ Mets	2–10	Fernandez	**Bielecki** (2–3)	—	41,987	74–80
155	September 26	@ Mets	8–2	**Drabek** (10–12)	Gooden	—	48,695	75–80
156	September 27	@ Mets	3–12	Ojeda	**Dunne** (12–6)	Orosco	48,588	75–81
157	September 30	Cubs	5–3	**Fisher** (11–9)	Sutcliffe	**Robinson** (15)		76–81
158	September 30	Cubs	8–10	Hall	**Smiley** (5–5)	—	6,985	76–82

October: 4–0 (Home: 4–0; Away: 0–0)

#	Date	Opponent	Score	Win	Loss	Save	Attendance	Record
159	October 1	Cubs	12–3	**Drabek** (11–12)	Sanderson	—	5,294	77–82
160	October 2	Phillies	6–4	**Walk** (8–2)	Jackson	**Gott** (13)	8,245	78–82
161	October 3	Phillies	10–5	**Palacios** (2–1)	Gross	—	12,790	79–82
162	October 4	Phillies	4–2	**Dunne** (13–6)	Bedrosian	**Robinson** (16)	26,734	80–82

Legend: = Win = Loss
Bold = Pirates team member

=== Record vs. opponents ===
1987 National League record Sources:
Team	ATL	CHC	CIN	HOU	LAD	MON	NYM	PHI	PIT	SD	SF	STL
Atlanta	—	6–5	8–10	8–10	6–12	3–9	7–5	7–5	7–5	6–12	8–10	3–9
Chicago	5–6	—	6–6	8–4	6–6	10–8	9–9	8–10	4–14	9–3	5–7	6–12
Cincinnati	10–8	6–6	—	13–5	10–8	6–6	7–5	5–7	4–8	12–6	7–11	4–8
Houston	10–8	4–8	5–13	—	12–6	7–5	6–6	6–6	6–6	5–13	10–8	5–7
Los Angeles	12–6	6–6	8–10	6–12	—	3–9	6–6	2–10	6–6	11–7	10–8	3–9
Montreal	9–3	8–10	6–6	5–7	9–3	—	8–10	10–8	11–7	9–3	5–7	11–7
New York	5–7	9–9	5–7	6–6	6–6	10–8	—	13–5	12–6	8–4	9–3	9–9
Philadelphia	5–7	10–8	7–5	6–6	10–2	8–10	5–13	—	11–7	8–4	2–10	8–10
Pittsburgh	5–7	14–4	8–4	6–6	6–6	7–11	6–12	7–11	—	8–4	6–6	7–11
San Diego	12–6	3–9	6–12	13–5	7–11	3–9	4–8	4–8	4–8	—	5–13	4–8
San Francisco	10–8	7–5	11–7	8–10	8–10	7–5	3–9	10–2	6–6	13–5	—	7–5
St. Louis	9–3	12–6	8–4	7–5	9–3	7–11	9–9	10–8	11–7	8–4	5–7	—

=== Detailed records ===
**National League**
Opponent	W	L	WP	RS	RA
**NL East**
Chicago Cubs	14	4	0.778	98	45
Montreal Expos	7	11	0.389	83	89
New York Mets	6	12	0.333	88	119
Philadelphia Phillies	7	11	0.389	82	87
St. Louis Cardinals	7	11	0.389	68	85
Total	41	49	0.456	419	425
**NL West**
Atlanta Braves	5	7	0.417	46	62
Cincinnati Reds	8	4	0.667	56	56
Houston Astros	6	6	0.500	42	47
Los Angeles Dodgers	6	6	0.500	41	45
San Diego Padres	8	4	0.667	74	54
San Francisco Giants	6	6	0.500	45	55
Total	39	33	0.542	304	319
Season Total	80	82	0.494	723	744

Month	Games	Won	Lost	Win %	RS	RA
April	19	8	11	0.421	85	92
May	27	13	14	0.481	124	140
June	30	13	17	0.433	123	145
July	26	11	15	0.423	94	110
August	29	15	14	0.517	149	133
September	27	16	11	0.593	116	110
October	4	4	0	1.000	32	14
Total	162	80	82	0.494	723	744

	Games	Won	Lost	Win %	RS	RA
Home	81	47	34	0.580	404	363
Away	81	33	48	0.407	319	381
Total	162	80	82	0.494	723	744

== Roster ==
1987 Pittsburgh Pirates
Roster
Pitchers: 34 Mike Bielecki; 15 Doug Drabek; 55 Tim Drummond; 41 Mike Dunne; 42 Logan Easley; 36,54 Brian Fisher; 28 Miguel García; 58 Brett Gideon; 35 Jim Gott; 56 Dave Johnson; 50 Barry Jones; 16 Bob Kipper; 38 Vicente Palacios; 30 Bob Patterson; 49 Hipólito Peña; 48 Rick Reuschel; 43 Don Robinson; 49 Jeff Robinson; 49 Mark Ross; 57 John Smiley; 52 Dorn Taylor; 17 Bob Walk	Catchers: 4,12 Mike LaValliere; 26 Junior Ortiz; 46 Tom Prince; 2 Mackey Sasser; Infielders: 12 Bill Almon; 6 Rafael Belliard; 25 Bobby Bonilla; 5 Sid Bream; 29 Onix Concepción; 29 Félix Fermín; 28 Denny González; 19 Houston Jiménez; 27 Sammy Khalifa; 13 José Lind; 2 Jim Morrison; 22 Al Pedrique; 3 Johnny Ray; 3 U L Washington	Outfielders: 24 Barry Bonds; 22,44 John Cangelosi; 7 Darnell Coles; 58 Butch Davis; 14 Mike Diaz; 47 Tommy Gregg; 19 Terry Harper; 23 R. J. Reynolds; 18 Andy Van Slyke	Manager: 10 Jim Leyland; Coaches: 45 Rich Donnelly (bullpen); 32 Gene Lamont (third base); 39 Milt May (hitting); 31 Ray Miller (pitching); 37 Tommy Sandt (first base)

=== Opening Day lineup ===
Opening Day Starters
#	Name	Position
24	Barry Bonds	CF
26	Junior Ortiz	C
3	Johnny Ray	2B
25	Bobby Bonilla	LF
18	Andy Van Slyke	RF
2	Jim Morrison	3B
5	Sid Bream	1B
6	Rafael Belliard	SS
30	Bob Patterson	SP

== Player stats ==
= Indicates team leader

Batting

Note: G = Games played; AB = At bats; H = Hits; Avg. = Batting average; HR = Home runs; RBI = Runs batted in

Regular season
Player	G	AB	H	Avg.	HR	RBI
O. Concepción	1	1	1	1.000	0	0
B. Gideon	29	1	1	1.000	0	2
J. Lind	35	143	46	0.322	0	11
A. Pedrique	88	246	74	0.301	1	27
B. Bonilla	141	466	140	0.300	15	77
M. LaValliere	121	340	102	0.300	1	36
U. Washington	10	10	3	0.300	0	0
A. Van Slyke	157	564	165	0.293	21	82
T. Harper	36	66	19	0.288	1	7
S. Bream	149	516	142	0.275	13	65
J. Cangelosi	104	182	50	0.275	4	18
J. Ray	123	472	129	0.273	5	54
J. Ortiz	75	192	52	0.271	1	22
J. Morrison	96	348	92	0.264	9	46
B. Bonds	150	551	144	0.261	25	59
R. Reynolds	117	335	87	0.260	7	51
F. Fermín	23	68	17	0.250	0	4
T. Gregg	10	8	2	0.250	0	0
J. Robinson	18	4	1	0.250	1	1
B. Kipper	26	33	8	0.242	0	0
M. Diaz	103	241	58	0.241	16	48
B. Walk	39	26	6	0.231	0	5
D. Coles	40	119	27	0.227	6	24
T. Prince	4	9	2	0.222	1	2
M. Sasser	12	23	5	0.217	0	2
R. Belliard	81	203	42	0.207	1	15
B. Almon	19	20	4	0.200	0	1
B. Fisher	37	58	11	0.190	2	9
S. Khalifa	5	17	3	0.176	0	2
H. Peña	16	6	1	0.167	0	0
D. Taylor	15	18	3	0.167	0	0
R. Reuschel	25	60	9	0.150	1	5
B. Davis	7	7	1	0.143	0	0
D. Robinson	44	7	1	0.143	0	1
J. Smiley	63	7	1	0.143	0	1
D. Drabek	30	59	7	0.119	0	4
V. Palacios	6	9	1	0.111	0	0
M. Dunne	23	53	5	0.094	0	3
B. Patterson	15	12	1	0.083	0	0
M. Bielecki	8	16	1	0.063	0	0
T. Drummond	6	1	0	0.000	0	0
L. Easley	17	2	0	0.000	0	0
D. González	5	7	0	0.000	0	0
J. Gott	25	1	0	0.000	0	0
H. Jiménez	5	6	0	0.000	0	0
B. Jones	32	3	0	0.000	0	0
M. García	1	0	0	—	0	0
D. Johnson	5	0	0	—	0	0
M. Ross	1	0	0	—	0	0
Team totals	162	5,536	1,464	0.264	131	684

Pitching

Note: G = Games pitched; IP = Innings pitched; W = Wins; L = Losses; ERA = Earned run average; SO = Strikeouts

Regular season
Player	G	IP	W	L	ERA	SO
M. García	1	2/3	0	0	0.00	0
J. Gott	25	31	0	2	1.45	27
R. Reuschel	25	177	8	6	2.75	80
M. Dunne	23	163 1/3	13	6	3.03	72
J. Robinson	18	26 2/3	2	1	3.04	19
B. Walk	39	117	8	2	3.31	78
D. Robinson	42	65 1/3	6	6	3.86	53
D. Drabek	29	176 1/3	11	12	3.88	120
V. Palacios	6	29 1/3	2	1	4.30	13
T. Drummond	6	6	0	0	4.50	5
B. Fisher	37	185 1/3	11	9	4.52	117
H. Peña	16	25 2/3	0	3	4.56	16
B. Gideon	29	36 2/3	1	5	4.66	31
M. Bielecki	8	45 2/3	2	3	4.73	25
L. Easley	17	26 1/3	1	1	5.47	21
B. Jones	32	43 1/3	2	4	5.61	28
D. Taylor	14	53 1/3	2	3	5.74	37
J. Smiley	63	75	5	5	5.76	58
B. Kipper	24	110 2/3	5	9	5.94	83
B. Patterson	15	43	1	4	6.70	27
M. Ross	1	1	0	0	9.00	0
D. Johnson	5	6 1/3	0	0	9.95	4
Team totals	162	1445	80	82	4.20	914

== Awards and honors ==
1987 Major League Baseball All-Star Game

- Rick Reuschel, P, reserve

== Transactions ==
- November 7, 1986 – Released U.L. Washington.
- November 12, 1986 – Released Ray Krawczyk.
- November 26, 1986 – Traded Pat Clements, Cecilio Guante and Rick Rhoden to the New York Yankees. Received Doug Drabek, Logan Easley and Brian Fisher.
- December 4, 1986 – Signed Butch Davis as a free agent.
- December 4, 1986 – Signed Vicente Palacios as a free agent.
- December 4, 1986 – Signed Mark Ross as a free agent.
- December 5, 1986 – Traded Rick Renteria to the Seattle Mariners. Received a player to be named later. The Seattle Mariners sent Bob Siegel (minors) (December 10, 1986) to the Pittsburgh Pirates to complete the trade.
- December 8, 1986 – Cecil Espy drafted by the Texas Rangers in the 1986 rule 5 draft.
- December 8, 1986 – Vicente Palacios drafted by the Milwaukee Brewers in the 1986 rule 5 draft.
- December 10, 1986 – Signed Houston Jimenez as a free agent.
- December 20, 1986 – Released Lee Tunnell.
- January 9, 1987 – Signed Carlos Garcia as an amateur free agent.
- January 20, 1987 – Signed U.L. Washington as a free agent.
- February 6, 1987 – Signed Lee Tunnell as a free agent.
- February 9, 1987 – Signed Onix Concepción as a free agent.
- March 22, 1987 – Purchased Dann Bilardello from the Montreal Expos.
- March 27, 1987 – Traded Jim Winn to the Chicago White Sox. Received John Cangelosi.
- March 31, 1987 – Released Mike Brown.
- April 1, 1987 – Traded Tony Peña to the St. Louis Cardinals. Received Mike Dunne, Mike LaValliere and Andy Van Slyke.
- April 3, 1987 – The Milwaukee Brewers returned Vicente Palacios (earlier draft pick).
- April 6, 1987 – Sold Lee Tunnell to the St. Louis Cardinals.
- April 6, 1987 – Released Larry McWilliams.
- May 19, 1987 – Purchased Paul Wilmet from the St. Louis Cardinals.
- May 29, 1987 – Traded Bill Almon to the New York Mets. Received Scott Little and Al Pedrique.
- June 2, 1987 – Drafted Ben Shelton in the 2nd round of the 1987 amateur draft.
- June 2, 1987 – Drafted Brian Williams in the 3rd round of the 1987 amateur draft, but did not sign the player.
- June 2, 1987 – Drafted Wes Chamberlain in the 4th round of the 1987 amateur draft. Player signed June 12, 1987.
- June 2, 1987 – Drafted Mickey Morandini in the 7th round of the 1987 amateur draft, but did not sign the player.
- June 2, 1987 – Drafted Kurt Knudsen in the 8th round of the 1987 amateur draft, but did not sign the player.
- June 2, 1987 – Drafted Steve Carter in the 17th round of the 1987 amateur draft.
- June 2, 1987 – Drafted Mike Fyhrie in the 19th round of the 1987 amateur draft, but did not sign the player.
- June 2, 1987 – Drafted Bob Ayrault in the 26th round of the 1987 amateur draft, but did not sign the player.
- June 2, 1987 – Drafted Paul Miller in the 53rd round of the 1987 amateur draft.
- June 15, 1987 – Released Onix Concepción.
- June 26, 1987 – Traded Pete Rice (minors) and Shawn Holman to the Detroit Tigers. Received Terry Harper.
- July 23, 1987 – Sold Dann Bilardello to the Kansas City Royals.
- July 31, 1987 – Traded Don Robinson to the San Francisco Giants. Received Mackey Sasser and $50,000.
- August 3, 1987 – Selected Jim Gott off waivers from the San Francisco Giants.
- August 7, 1987 – Traded Jim Morrison to the Detroit Tigers. Received a player to be named later and Darnell Coles. The Detroit Tigers sent Morris Madden (August 12, 1987) to the Pittsburgh Pirates to complete the trade.
- August 21, 1987 – Traded Rick Reuschel to the San Francisco Giants. Received Scott Medvin and Jeff Robinson.
- August 29, 1987 – Traded Johnny Ray to the California Angels. Received a player to be named later and Billie Merrifield (minors). The California Angels sent Miguel Garcia (September 3, 1987) to the Pittsburgh Pirates to complete the trade.
- October 5, 1987 – Released U.L. Washington.
- October 15, 1987 – Butch Davis granted free agency.
- October 15, 1987 – Houston Jimenez granted free agency.
- October 15, 1987 – Mark Ross granted free agency.

== Farm system ==
Level	Team	League	Manager
AAA	Vancouver Canadians	Pacific Coast League	Rocky Bridges
AA	Harrisburg Senators	Eastern League	Dave Trembley
A	Salem Buccaneers	Carolina League	Steve Demeter
A	Macon Pirates	South Atlantic League	Dennis Rogers
A-Short Season	Watertown Pirates	New York–Penn League	Jeff Cox
Rookie	GCL Pirates	Gulf Coast League	Woody Huyke

LEAGUE CHAMPIONS: Harrisburg, Salem
