= 1989 Pittsburgh Pirates season =

1989 Pittsburgh Pirates
- League: National League
- Division: East
- Ballpark: Three Rivers Stadium
- City: Pittsburgh, Pennsylvania
- Record: 74–88 (.457)
- Divisional place: 5th
- Owners: Pittsburgh Associates
- General managers: Larry Doughty
- Managers: Jim Leyland
- Television: KDKA-TV (Steve Blass, Lanny Frattare, Jim Rooker, John Sanders); KBL (Steve Blass, Lanny Frattare, Jim Rooker, John Sanders)
- Radio: KDKA-AM (Steve Blass, Lanny Frattare, Jim Rooker, John Sanders)

The 1989 Pittsburgh Pirates season was the 108th season of the Pittsburgh Pirates franchise; the 103rd in the National League. This was their 20th season at Three Rivers Stadium. The Pirates finished fifth in the National League East with a record of 74–88.

== Offseason ==
- November 9, 1988: Randy Milligan was traded by the Pirates to the Baltimore Orioles for Pete Blohm (minors).
- November 28, 1988: Denny González and a player to be named later were traded by the Pirates to the Cleveland Indians for a player to be named later. The deal was completed on March 25, 1989, with the Pirates sending Félix Fermín to the Indians, and the Indians sending Jay Bell to the Pirates.

== Regular season ==
=== Season standings ===
NL East
Team	W	L	Pct.	GB	Home	Road
Chicago Cubs	93	69	.574	—	48‍–‍33	45‍–‍36
New York Mets	87	75	.537	6	51‍–‍30	36‍–‍45
St. Louis Cardinals	86	76	.531	7	46‍–‍35	40‍–‍41
Montreal Expos	81	81	.500	12	44‍–‍37	37‍–‍44
Pittsburgh Pirates	74	88	.457	19	39‍–‍42	35‍–‍46
Philadelphia Phillies	67	95	.414	26	38‍–‍42	29‍–‍53

=== Game log ===
1989 Game Log: 74–88 (Home: 39–42; Away: 35–46)
April: 10–14 (Home: 7–8; Away: 3–6)

#	Date	Opponent	Score	Win	Loss	Save	Attendance	Record
1	April 4	@ Expos	5–6	McGaffigan	**Robinson**	—	35,154	0–1
2	April 5	@ Expos	3–0	**Drabek**	Johnson	—	9,137	1–1
3	April 6	@ Expos	2–3	Burke	**Smiley**	Hesketh	8,722	1–2
4	April 7	@ Cubs	5–6	Wilson	**Taylor**	Williams	6,195	1–3
5	April 8	@ Cubs	3–5	Bielecki	**Heaton**	Schiraldi	19,374	1–4
6	April 9	@ Cubs	3–8	Sutcliffe	**Walk**	—	11,387	1–5
7	April 11	Mets	4–3 (11)	**Robinson**	Myers	—	42,910	2–5
8	April 13	Mets	4–2	**Smiley**	Darling	**Robinson**	19,105	3–5
9	April 14	Expos	6–7	Hesketh	**Medvin**	McGaffigan	15,052	3–6
10	April 15	Expos	6–4	**Dunne**	Johnson	**Robinson**	9,658	4–6
11	April 16	Expos	4–5 (11)	Hesketh	**Robinson**	Burke	18,107	4–7
12	April 17	@ Cardinals	2–4	Terry	**Fisher**	Worrell	25,277	4–8
13	April 18	@ Cardinals	4–3	**Madden**	Worrell	**Robinson**	22,198	5–8
14	April 19	@ Cardinals	7–5	**Walk**	Heinkel	**Robinson**	29,132	6–8
15	April 20	Phillies	4–9	Howell	**Dunne**	—	6,977	6–9
16	April 21	Phillies	2–3	Youmans	**Drabek**	Bedrosian	15,221	6–10
17	April 22	Phillies	4–3	**Robinson**	Carman	—	14,669	7–10
18	April 23	Phillies	6–4	**Easley**	Bedrosian	—	16,816	8–10
19	April 25	Padres	0–1	Show	**Walk**	Davis	5,296	8–11
20	April 26	Padres	1–3	Hurst	**Drabek**	—	14,126	8–12
21	April 27	Padres	1–8	Whitson	**Heaton**	—	6,473	8–13
22	April 28	Giants	1–0	**Smiley**	Reuschel	—	12,913	9–13
23	April 29	Giants	3–4	LaCoss	**Robinson**	—	11,509	9–14
24	April 30	Giants	11–1	**Walk**	Robinson	—	20,940	10–14

May: 11–14 (Home: 4–5; Away: 7–9)

#	Date	Opponent	Score	Win	Loss	Save	Attendance	Record
25	May 1	@ Dodgers	0–1	Howell	**Drabek**	—	27,630	10–15
26	May 2	@ Dodgers	0–7	Hershiser	**Heaton**	—	29,310	10–16
27	May 3	@ Giants	5–3	**Smiley**	Robinson	**Easley**	8,536	11–16
28	May 4	@ Giants	3–6	Krukow	**Kramer**	Lefferts	11,820	11–17
29	May 5	@ Padres	4–2	**Walk**	Show	—	53,970	12–17
30	May 6	@ Padres	2–4	Hurst	**Drabek**	Davis	33,582	12–18
31	May 7	@ Padres	1–3	Whitson	**Heaton**	Davis	33,144	12–19
32	May 12	Braves	10–2	**Smiley**	Smith	—	13,378	13–19
33	May 13	Braves	8–3	**Walk**	Smith	—	15,828	14–19
34	May 14	Braves	2–5	Smoltz	**Drabek**	Boever	11,403	14–20
35	May 15	@ Reds	5–6	Charlton	**Robinson**	—	16,030	14–21
36	May 16	@ Reds	5–0	**Kramer**	Mahler	—	22,595	15–21
37	May 17	@ Reds	4–5 (10)	Franco	**Landrum**	—	23,553	15–22
38	May 19	@ Astros	0–3	Scott	**Walk**	—	21,413	15–23
39	May 20	@ Astros	4–5 (12)	Agosto	**Kipper**	—	20,595	15–24
40	May 21	@ Astros	17–5	**Heaton**	Clancy	**Fisher**	18,942	16–24
41	May 23	@ Braves	5–2	**Smiley**	Smith	—	6,137	17–24
42	May 24	@ Braves	4–1 (14)	**Landrum**	Acker	—	5,896	18–24
43	May 25	@ Braves	7–3	**Drabek**	Smith	**Landrum**	5,517	19–24
44	May 26	Astros	2–4	Clancy	**Heaton**	Smith	26,637	19–25
45	May 27	Astros	4–5 (12)	Schatzeder	**Robinson**	Smith	22,359	19–26
46	May 28	Astros	2–9	Scott	**Smiley**	Agosto	25,776	19–27
47	May 29	Reds	12–3	**Walk**	Browning	**Kipper**	18,602	20–27
48	May 30	Reds	2–0	**Drabek**	Mahler	**Kramer**	14,952	21–27
49	May 31	Reds	3–4	Rijo	**Heaton**	Franco	22,932	21–28

June: 12–13 (Home: 6–6; Away: 6–7)

#	Date	Opponent	Score	Win	Loss	Save	Attendance	Record
50	June 2	@ Mets	2–3 (11)	Aguilera	**Kramer**	—	42,578	21–29
51	June 3	@ Mets	3–9	Darling	**Walk**	—	47,835	21–30
52	June 4	@ Mets	3–4	Aase	**Kipper**	Myers	47,478	21–31
53	June 5	@ Phillies	3–3 (8)			—	17,696	21–31
54	June 6	@ Phillies	4–9	Sebra	**Fisher**	Parrett	16,783	21–32
55	June 7	@ Phillies	5–7	Parrett	**Kipper**	Bedrosian	15,480	21–33
56	June 8	@ Phillies	11–15	Carman	**Robinson**	—	18,511	21–34
57	June 9	Mets	4–3 (10)	**Landrum**	McDowell	—	20,819	22–34
58	June 10	Mets	6–5	**Kipper**	Myers	—	27,463	23–34
59	June 11	Mets	1–6	Ojeda	**Fisher**	—	37,716	23–35
60	June 13	Phillies	2–10	Howell	**Madden**	—	11,570	23–36
61	June 14	Phillies	6–4	**Smiley**	Carman	**Landrum**	7,407	24–36
62	June 15	Phillies	5–3	**Drabek**	Sebra	**Landrum**	15,428	25–36
63	June 16	@ Cardinals	2–6	Terry	**Kramer**	Dayley	47,186	25–37
64	June 17	@ Cardinals	7–2	**Robinson**	DeLeon	**Kipper**	43,924	26–37
65	June 18	@ Cardinals	12–4	**Madden**	Magrane	**Landrum**	40,198	27–37
66	June 20	Cubs	4–5 (11)	Schiraldi	**Garcia**	Kilgus	11,713	27–38
67	June 21	Cubs	0–1 (11)	Maddux	**Bair**	Williams	23,970	27–39
68	June 22	Cubs	0–8	Sutcliffe	**Kramer**	—	16,430	27–40
69	June 23	Cardinals	2–3	Magrane	**Madden**	Worrell	22,904	27–41
70	June 24	Cardinals	5–2	**Walk**	Terry	**Landrum**	36,064	28–41
71	June 25	Cardinals	5–3	**Smiley**	Power	**Landrum**	22,514	29–41
72	June 26	@ Cubs	2–1	**Drabek**	Maddux	—	35,407	30–41
73	June 27	@ Cubs	5–4	**Kramer**	Sutcliffe	**Landrum**	35,646	31–41
74	June 28	@ Cubs	3–1	**Robinson**	Bielecki	**Landrum**	34,114	32–41
75	June 30	@ Dodgers	4–3	**Walk**	Hershiser	**Landrum**	46,411	33–41

July: 12–18 (Home: 5–8; Away: 7–10)

#	Date	Opponent	Score	Win	Loss	Save	Attendance	Record
76	July 1	@ Dodgers	0–1	Belcher	**Smiley**	—	33,692	33–42
77	July 2	@ Dodgers	2–3	Wetteland	**Drabek**	Howell	40,789	33–43
78	July 3	@ Dodgers	4–2	**Robinson**	Morgan	**Landrum**	29,673	34–43
79	July 4	Giants	5–3	**Kramer**	Robinson	**Landrum**	14,186	35–43
80	July 5	Giants	4–6	Wilson	**Walk**	—	22,242	35–44
81	July 6	Giants	1–2 (10)	Brantley	**Smiley**	Lefferts	18,165	35–45
82	July 7	Padres	3–0	**Drabek**	Hurst	—	18,907	36–45
83	July 8	Padres	0–2	Whitson	**Robinson**	—	25,852	36–46
84	July 9	Padres	3–5	Grant	**Kramer**	Davis	23,584	36–47
85	July 13	@ Giants	2–3 (13)	Brantley	**Garcia**	—	17,178	36–48
86	July 14	@ Giants	7–4	**Drabek**	Reuschel	**Landrum**	18,238	37–48
87	July 15	@ Giants	3–8	LaCoss	**Smiley**	—	27,881	37–49
88	July 16	@ Giants	1–3	Garrelts	**Robinson**	Bedrosian	44,781	37–50
89	July 17	@ Padres	4–1	**Kramer**	Harris	**Landrum**	13,667	38–50
90	July 18	@ Padres	4–17	Hurst	**Walk**	—	18,777	38–51
91	July 19	@ Padres	1–9	Whitson	**Drabek**	—	16,412	38–52
92	July 21	Dodgers	4–1	**Smiley**	Belcher	—		39–52
93	July 21	Dodgers	3–7	Valenzuela	**Heaton**	Howell	27,996	39–53
94	July 22	Dodgers	4–8	Martinez	**Robinson**	—	31,108	39–54
95	July 23	Dodgers	3–4	Hershiser	**Kramer**	Howell		39–55
96	July 23	Dodgers	2–1 (10)	**Kipper**	Crews	—	34,373	40–55
97	July 24	Dodgers	7–4	**Walk**	Morgan	—	19,957	41–55
98	July 25	@ Mets	4–2	**Drabek**	Aguilera	**Landrum**	38,249	42–55
99	July 26	@ Mets	3–2	**Smiley**	Darling	—	38,134	43–55
100	July 27	@ Mets	10–8	**Kipper**	Aase	**Landrum**	39,447	44–55
101	July 28	@ Phillies	10–5	**Heaton**	Howell	—		45–55
102	July 28	@ Phillies	1–6	Harris	**Reed**	—	35,569	45–56
103	July 29	@ Phillies	2–6	Parrett	**Walk**	McDowell	47,277	45–57
104	July 30	@ Phillies	6–8	Cook	**Kipper**	McDowell	31,341	45–58
105	July 31	Expos	2–4	Langston	**Smiley**	Burke	13,150	45–59

August: 13–15 (Home: 8–7; Away: 5–8)

#	Date	Opponent	Score	Win	Loss	Save	Attendance	Record
106	August 1	Expos	4–5 (11)	Burke	**Bair**	—	14,912	45–60
107	August 2	Expos	1–3	Perez	**Reed**	Burke	27,645	45–61
108	August 3	Expos	1–0 (12)	**Bair**	McGaffigan	—	12,292	46–61
109	August 4	Cubs	2–3	Bielecki	**Drabek**	Williams	29,169	46–62
110	August 5	Cubs	2–4	Wilson	**Landrum**	Lancaster	23,262	46–63
111	August 6	Cubs	5–4 (18)	**Drabek**	Sanderson	—	24,716	47–63
112	August 7	Cardinals	0–4	Power	**Reed**	—	11,772	47–64
113	August 8	Cardinals	7–3	**Walk**	Hill	—	13,884	48–64
114	August 9	Cardinals	2–5	Magrane	**Drabek**	—	15,046	48–65
115	August 11	@ Expos	1–4	Langston	**Smiley**	—	30,123	48–66
116	August 12	@ Expos	2–5	Gross	**Robinson**	Smith	27,697	48–67
117	August 13	@ Expos	6–4	**Walk**	Perez	**Landrum**	38,576	49–67
118	August 14	@ Expos	6–1	**Drabek**	Martinez	—	18,838	50–67
119	August 15	@ Astros	2–3 (11)	Andersen	**Smith**	—	23,574	50–68
120	August 16	@ Astros	5–4 (12)	**Heaton**	Andersen	**Landrum**	17,317	51–68
121	August 17	@ Astros	3–5	Deshaies	**Robinson**	—	25,325	51–69
122	August 18	@ Braves	6–13	Glavine	**Walk**	—	17,154	51–70
123	August 19	@ Braves	3–4	Smoltz	**Drabek**	Boever	27,034	51–71
124	August 20	@ Braves	7–6	**Reed**	Smith	**Landrum**	9,222	52–71
125	August 22	Astros	4–1	**Smiley**	Deshaies	—	14,638	53–71
126	August 23	Astros	6–1	**Walk**	Clancy	—	12,564	54–71
127	August 24	Astros	3–2 (14)	**Bair**	Agosto	—	13,884	55–71
128	August 25	@ Reds	12–3	**Robinson**	Mahler	—	25,722	56–71
129	August 26	@ Reds	4–6	Robinson	**Reed**	Franco	26,159	56–72
130	August 27	@ Reds	0–1	Browning	**Kramer**	Franco	22,413	56–73
131	August 28	Braves	2–5	Smith	**Walk**	Stanton	9,854	56–74
132	August 29	Braves	5–4	**Drabek**	Glavine	**Landrum**	9,686	57–74
133	August 30	Braves	7–5	**Kramer**	Boever	**Landrum**	8,314	58–74

September: 16–13 (Home: 9–7; Away: 7–6)

#	Date	Opponent	Score	Win	Loss	Save	Attendance	Record
134	September 1	Reds	5–11	Robinson	**Patterson**	—	15,623	58–75
135	September 2	Reds	2–6	Browning	**Walk**	—	25,682	58–76
136	September 3	Reds	3–1	**Drabek**	Scudder	**Landrum**	24,175	59–76
137	September 4	@ Phillies	7–5	**Patterson**	Maddux	**Landrum**	13,317	60–76
138	September 5	@ Phillies	2–3	Parrett	**Patterson**	—	12,484	60–77
139	September 6	@ Expos	6–11	Langston	**Kramer**	—	17,330	60–78
140	September 7	@ Expos	7–4	**Walk**	Candelaria	**Landrum**	16,390	61–78
141	September 8	@ Mets	2–7	Ojeda	**Drabek**	—	36,902	61–79
142	September 9	@ Mets	8–5 (12)	**Taylor**	Innis	**Patterson**	41,722	62–79
143	September 10	@ Mets	4–1	**Smiley**	Fernandez	**Kipper**	45,024	63–79
144	September 11	@ Cardinals	3–1	**Heaton**	Horton	**Bair**	25,642	64–79
145	September 12	@ Cardinals	5–2	**Walk**	Magrane	—	25,370	65–79
146	September 13	@ Cardinals	0–0 (6)			—	28,561	65–79
147	September 14	@ Cardinals	4–3	**Patterson**	Dayley	**Kipper**	1,519	66–79
148	September 15	Cubs	2–7	Sutcliffe	**Belinda**	—	12,607	66–80
149	September 16	Cubs	8–6	**Smiley**	Maddux	—	15,668	67–80
150	September 17	Cubs	2–0	**Drabek**	Bielecki	—	21,081	68–80
151	September 18	Phillies	6–2	**Patterson**	Grimsley	**Kramer**	7,665	69–80
152	September 19	Phillies	4–2	**Robinson**	Ruffin	**Landrum**	8,156	70–80
153	September 20	Expos	9–1	**Heaton**	Gross	—	11,926	71–80
154	September 21	Expos	5–6	Martinez	**Smiley**	Burke	6,753	71–81
155	September 22	@ Cubs	2–4	Bielecki	**Drabek**	Williams	34,040	71–82
156	September 23	@ Cubs	2–3	Lancaster	**Bair**	—	36,849	71–83
157	September 24	@ Cubs	2–4	Wilson	**Robinson**	Pico	37,904	71–84
158	September 25	Cardinals	4–2	**Heaton**	DeLeon	**Landrum**	4,278	72–84
159	September 26	Cardinals	4–1	**Patterson**	Hill	**Landrum**	8,101	73–84
160	September 27	Cardinals	1–0	**Drabek**	Magrane	—	5,051	74–84
161	September 29	Mets	2–6	Viola	**Kramer**	—		74–85
162	September 29	Mets	0–7	Cone	**Robinson**	—	16,734	74–86
163	September 30	Mets	2–7 (11)	Myers	**Landrum**	—	20,624	74–87

October: 0–1 (Home: 0–1; Away: 0–0)

#	Date	Opponent	Score	Win	Loss	Save	Attendance	Record
164	October 1	Mets	3–7	Fernandez	**Patterson**	—	23,502	74–88

Legend: = Win = Loss = Tie
Bold = Pirates team member

=== Record vs. opponents ===
1989 National League record Sources:
Team	ATL	CHC	CIN	HOU	LAD	MON	NYM	PHI	PIT	SD	SF	STL
Atlanta	—	5–7	8–10	8–10	6–10	6–6	2–10	8–4	4–8	7–11	6–12	3–9
Chicago	7–5	—	7–5	5–7	7–5	10–8	10–8	10–8	12–6	8–4	6–6	11–7
Cincinnati	10–8	5–7	—	8–10	8–10	4–8	4–8	4–8	7–5	9–9	8–10	8–4
Houston	10–8	7–5	10–8	—	10–8	4–8	6–6	9–3	7–5	8–10	8–10	7–5
Los Angeles	10–6	5–7	10–8	8–10	—	7–5	5–7	6–6	7–5	6–12	10–8	3–9
Montreal	6–6	8–10	8–4	8–4	5–7	—	9–9	9–9	11–7	5–7	7–5	5–13
New York	10–2	8–10	8–4	6–6	7–5	9–9	—	12–6	9–9	5–7	3–9	10–8
Philadelphia	4–8	8–10	8–4	3–9	6–6	9–9	6–12	—	10–8	2–10	4–8	7–11
Pittsburgh	8–4	6–12	5–7	5–7	5–7	7–11	9–9	8–10	—	3–9	5–7	13–5
San Diego	11–7	4–8	9–9	10–8	12–6	7–5	7–5	10–2	9–3	—	8–10	2–10
San Francisco	12–6	6–6	10–8	10–8	8–10	5–7	9–3	8–4	7–5	10–8	—	7–5
St. Louis	9–3	7–11	4–8	5–7	9–3	13–5	8–10	11–7	5–13	10–2	5–7	—

=== Detailed records ===
**National League**
Opponent	W	L	WP	RS	RA
**NL East**
Chicago Cubs	6	12	0.333	52	74
Montreal Expos	7	11	0.389	76	73
New York Mets	9	9	0.500	65	87
Philadelphia Phillies	8	10	0.444	90	107
St. Louis Cardinals	13	5	0.722	76	53
Total	43	47	0.478	359	394
**NL West**
Atlanta Braves	8	4	0.667	66	53
Cincinnati Reds	5	7	0.417	57	46
Houston Astros	5	7	0.417	52	47
Los Angeles Dodgers	5	7	0.417	33	42
San Diego Padres	3	9	0.250	24	55
San Francisco Giants	5	7	0.417	46	43
Total	31	41	0.431	278	286
Season Total	74	88	0.457	637	680

Month	Games	Won	Lost	Win %	RS	RA
April	24	10	14	0.417	91	97
May	25	11	14	0.440	111	91
June	25	12	13	0.480	106	124
July	30	12	18	0.400	105	135
August	28	13	15	0.464	108	108
September	29	16	13	0.552	113	118
October	1	0	1	0.000	3	7
Total	162	74	88	0.457	637	680

	Games	Won	Lost	Win %	RS	RA
Home	81	39	42	0.481	296	313
Away	81	35	46	0.432	341	367
Total	162	74	88	0.457	637	680

== Roster ==
1989 Pittsburgh Pirates
Roster
Pitchers: 46 Doug Bair; 60 Stan Belinda; 15 Doug Drabek; 41 Mike Dunne; 22 Logan Easley; 54 Brian Fisher; 27 Miguel García; 35 Jim Gott; 26 Neal Heaton; 16 Bob Kipper; 28 Randy Kramer; 43 Bill Landrum; 59 Morris Madden; 55 Scott Medvin; 38 Bob Patterson; 34 Rick Reed; 49 Jeff Robinson; 58 Roger Samuels; 57 John Smiley; 41 Mike Smith; 52 Dorn Taylor; 17 Bob Walk	Catchers: 22 Dann Bilardello; 12 Mike LaValliere; 0 Junior Ortiz; 14 Tom Prince; Infielders: 3 Jay Bell; 6 Rafael Belliard; 25 Bobby Bonilla; 5 Sid Bream; 30 Benny Distefano; 7 Jeff King; 13 José Lind; 14 Ken Oberkfell; 51 Rey Quiñones; 2 Gary Redus	Outfielders: 24 Barry Bonds; 44 John Cangelosi; 42 Steve Carter; 19 Albert Hall; 29 Billy Hatcher; 38 Scott Little; 23 R. J. Reynolds; 18 Andy Van Slyke; 11 Glenn Wilson	Manager: 10 Jim Leyland; Coaches: 45 Rich Donnelly (bullpen); 36 Bruce Kimm (bench); 32 Gene Lamont (third base); 39 Milt May (hitting); 31 Ray Miller (pitching); 37 Tommy Sandt (first base)

=== Opening Day lineup ===
Opening Day Starters
#	Name	Position
24	Barry Bonds	LF
13	José Lind	2B
18	Andy Van Slyke	CF
25	Bobby Bonilla	3B
5	Sid Bream	1B
11	Glenn Wilson	RF
12	Mike LaValliere	C
3	Jay Bell	SS
17	Bob Walk	SP

== Player stats ==
Batting

Note: G = Games played; AB = At bats; H = Hits; Avg. = Batting average; HR = Home runs; RBI = Runs batted in

Regular season
Player	G	AB	H	Avg.	HR	RBI
M. García	11	1	1	1.000	0	0
M. LaValliere	68	190	60	0.316	2	23
G. Redus	98	279	79	0.283	6	33
G. Wilson	100	330	93	0.282	9	49
B. Bonilla	163	616	173	0.281	24	86
R. Reynolds	125	363	98	0.270	6	48
J. Bell	78	271	70	0.258	2	27
M. Dunne	3	4	1	0.250	0	0
S. Little	3	4	1	0.250	0	0
B. Bonds	159	580	144	0.248	19	58
B. Distefano	96	154	38	0.247	2	15
B. Hatcher	27	86	21	0.244	1	7
A. Van Slyke	130	476	113	0.237	9	53
J. Lind	153	578	134	0.232	2	48
J. Robinson	50	35	8	0.229	1	3
D. Bilardello	33	80	18	0.225	2	8
S. Bream	19	36	8	0.222	0	4
J. Cangelosi	112	160	35	0.219	0	9
J. Ortiz	91	230	50	0.217	1	22
R. Belliard	67	154	33	0.214	0	8
N. Heaton	44	42	9	0.214	0	2
R. Quiñones	71	225	47	0.209	3	29
D. Bair	44	5	1	0.200	0	0
J. King	75	215	42	0.195	5	19
B. Walk	33	70	13	0.186	0	9
A. Hall	20	33	6	0.182	0	1
R. Kramer	37	33	5	0.152	0	2
J. Smiley	28	65	9	0.138	0	7
T. Prince	21	52	7	0.135	0	5
S. Carter	9	16	2	0.125	1	3
K. Oberkfell	14	40	5	0.125	0	2
B. Kipper	52	9	1	0.111	0	1
D. Drabek	40	77	8	0.104	0	3
R. Reed	15	13	1	0.077	0	0
L. Easley	10	1	0	0.000	0	0
B. Fisher	9	5	0	0.000	0	0
B. Landrum	56	3	0	0.000	0	0
M. Madden	10	1	0	0.000	0	0
B. Patterson	12	3	0	0.000	0	0
M. Smith	16	3	0	0.000	0	0
D. Taylor	10	1	0	0.000	0	0
S. Belinda	8	0	0	—	0	0
J. Gott	1	0	0	—	0	0
S. Medvin	6	0	0	—	0	0
R. Samuels	5	0	0	—	0	0
Team totals	164	5,539	1,334	0.241	95	584

Pitching

Note: G = Games pitched; IP = Innings pitched; W = Wins; L = Losses; ERA = Earned run average; SO = Strikeouts

Regular season
Player	G	IP	W	L	ERA	SO
J. Gott	1	2/3	0	0	0.00	1
B. Landrum	56	81	2	3	1.67	51
D. Bair	44	67 1/3	2	3	2.27	56
D. Drabek	35	244 1/3	14	12	2.80	123
J. Smiley	28	205 1/3	12	8	2.81	123
B. Kipper	52	83	3	4	2.93	58
N. Heaton	42	147 1/3	6	7	3.05	67
M. Smith	16	24	0	1	3.75	12
R. Kramer	35	111 1/3	5	9	3.96	52
B. Patterson	12	26 2/3	4	3	4.05	20
L. Easley	10	12 1/3	1	0	4.38	6
B. Walk	33	196	13	10	4.41	83
J. Robinson	50	141 1/3	7	13	4.58	95
D. Taylor	9	10 2/3	1	1	5.06	3
R. Reed	15	54 2/3	1	4	5.60	34
S. Medvin	6	6 1/3	0	1	5.68	4
S. Belinda	8	10 1/3	0	1	6.10	10
M. Madden	9	14	2	2	7.07	6
M. Dunne	3	14 1/3	1	1	7.53	4
B. Fisher	9	17	0	3	7.94	8
M. García	11	16	0	2	8.44	9
R. Samuels	5	3 2/3	0	0	9.82	2
Team totals	164	1,487 2/3	74	88	3.64	827

== Awards and honors ==
1989 Major League Baseball All-Star Game

- Bobby Bonilla, 3B, reserve

== Farm system ==
Level	Team	League	Manager
AAA	Buffalo Bisons	American Association	Terry Collins
AA	Harrisburg Senators	Eastern League	Dave Trembley
A	Salem Buccaneers	Carolina League	Rocky Bridges
A	Augusta Pirates	South Atlantic League	Stan Cliburn
A-Short Season	Welland Pirates	New York–Penn League	U. L. Washington
Rookie	Princeton Pirates	Appalachian League	Julio Garcia
Rookie	GCL Pirates	Gulf Coast League	Woody Huyke

LEAGUE CHAMPIONS: Augusta
