= List of Pittsburgh Pirates seasons =

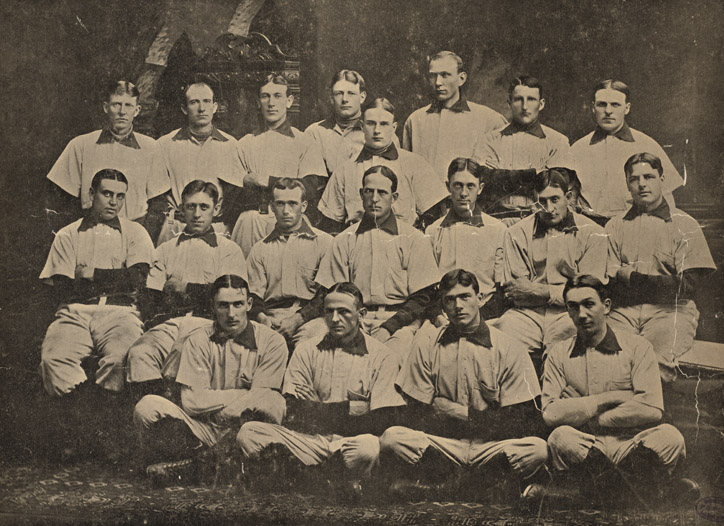
The Pirates won the National League in 1901 and 1902, before participating in the first World Series in 1903.

The Pittsburgh Pirates have completed 132 seasons in Major League Baseball (MLB) since joining the National League (NL) in 1887. Through 2018, they have played 20,256 regular season games, winning 10,240 and losing 10,016, for a winning percentage of .506. The Pirates are also a combined total of 43—53 (.448) in post-season play. Prior to joining the National League in 1887 the franchise compiled a record of 236—296 (.444) in five seasons of the American Association.

This list documents the season-by-season records of the Pirates’ franchise including their years as the “Alleghenies”^{[l]} (alternately spelled Alleghenys). The Pirates moved from the American Association to the National League after owner William Nimick became upset over a contract dispute, thus establishing the extant franchise. The team currently plays home games at PNC Park which they moved into in 2001. Prior to PNC Park, the Pirates played home games at Three Rivers Stadium and Forbes Field, among other stadiums.

In 1903, the Pirates were defeated by the Boston Americans in the first World Series. The Pirates returned to and won the World Series in 1909, over the Detroit Tigers. Since then the Pirates have won World Series in 1925, 1960, 1971, and 1979. In addition to these five World Series victories the Pirates have won nine National League pennants and qualified for the playoffs fifteen times, six of which were during a run of twelve winning seasons between 1969 and 1980.

The franchise's original colors were red and blue, which were switched to black and gold—colors that all professional Pittsburgh sports franchises now share—for the 1948 season.

== Table key ==
NLCS	National League Championship Series
NLDS	National League Division Series
ASGMVP	All-Star Game Most Valuable Player
CPOY	Comeback Player of the Year
CYA	Cy Young Award
Finish	Final position in league or division
GB	"Games Back" from first-place team^{[a]}
Losses	Number of regular season losses
MOY	Manager of the Year
MVP	Most Valuable Player
ROY	National League Rookie of the Year
Season	Each year is linked to an article about that particular MLB season
Team	Each year is linked to an article about that particular Yankees season
Wins	Number of regular season wins
WSMVP	World Series Most Valuable Player

== Season by season ==
World Series Champions (1903–present) †	National League Champions (1883–present) *	Division Champions (1969–present) ^	Wild card Berth (1994–present) ¤

MLB season	Team season	League	Division	Finish	Wins	Losses	Win%	GB	Postseason	Awards
Pittsburgh Alleghenys
1882	1882	AA		4th	39	39	.500	15		
1883	1883	AA		7th	31	67	.316	35		
1884	1884	AA		11th	30	78	.278	45½		
1885	1885	AA		3rd	56	55	.505	22½		
1886	1886	AA		2nd	80	57	.584	12		
1887	1887	NL		6th	55	69	.444	24		
1888	1888	NL		6th	66	68	.493	19½		
1889	1889	NL		5th	61	71	.462	25		
1890	1890^{[n]}	NL		8th	23	113	.169	66½		
Pittsburgh Pirates
1891	1891^{[o]}	NL		8th	55	80	.407	30½		
1892	1892	NL		6th	80	73	.523	23½		
1893	1893	NL		2nd	81	48	.628	5		
1894	1894	NL		7th	65	65	.500	25		
1895	1895	NL		7th	71	61	.538	17		
1896	1896	NL		6th	66	63	.512	24		
1897	1897	NL		8th	60	71	.458	32½		
1898	1898	NL		8th	72	76	.486	29½		
1899	1899	NL		7th	76	73	.510	25½		
1900	1900	NL		2nd	79	60	.568	4½	Lost Chronicle-Telegraph Cup (Superbas) 3-1	
1901	1901	NL *		1st	90	49	.647	–	Pre-World Series Era NL Champions *	
1902	1902	NL *		1st	103	36	.741	–	Pre-World Series Era NL Champions *	
1903	1903	NL *		1st	91	49	.647	–	Lost World Series (Americans) 5–3 *	
1904	1904	NL		4th	87	66	.569	19		
1905	1905	NL		2nd	96	57	.627	9		
1906	1906	NL		3rd	93	60	.608	23½		
1907	1907	NL		2nd	91	63	.591	17		
1908	1908	NL		2nd	98	56	.636	1		
1909 †	1909^{[p]}	NL *		1st	110	42	.724	–	Won World Series (Tigers) 4–3 †	
1910	1910	NL		3rd	86	67	.562	17½		
1911	1911	NL		3rd	85	69	.552	14½		
1912	1912	NL		2nd	93	58	.616	10		
1913	1913	NL		4th	78	71	.523	21½		
1914	1914	NL		7th	69	85	.448	25½		
1915	1915	NL		5th	73	81	.474	18		
1916	1916	NL		6th	65	89	.422	29		
1917	1917	NL		8th	51	103	.331	47		
1918	1918	NL		4th	65	60	.520	17		
1919	1919	NL		4th	71	68	.511	24½		
1920	1920	NL		4th	79	75	.513	14		
1921	1921	NL		2nd	90	63	.588	4		
1922	1922	NL		3rd	85	69	.552	8		
1923	1923	NL		3rd	87	67	.565	8½		
1924	1924	NL		3rd	90	63	.588	3		
1925 †	1925	NL *		1st	95	68	.621	–	Won World Series (Senators) 4–3 †	
1926	1926	NL		3rd	84	69	.549	4½		
1927	1927	NL *		1st	94	60	.610	–	Lost World Series (Yankees) 4–0 *	Paul Waner (MVP)^{[e]}
1928	1928	NL		4th	85	67	.559	9		
1929	1929	NL		2nd	88	65	.575	10½		
1930	1930	NL		5th	80	74	.519	12		
1931	1931	NL		5th	75	79	.487	26		
1932	1932	NL		2nd	86	68	.558	4		
1933	1933	NL		2nd	87	67	.565	5		
1934	1934	NL		5th	74	76	.493	19½		
1935	1935	NL		4th	86	67	.562	13½		
1936	1936	NL		4th	84	70	.545	8		
1937	1937	NL		3rd	86	68	.558	10		
1938	1938	NL		2nd	86	64	.573	2		
1939	1939	NL		6th	68	85	.444	28½		
1940	1940	NL		4th	78	76	.506	22½		
1941	1941	NL		4th	81	73	.526	19		
1942	1942	NL		5th	66	81	.449	36½		
1943	1943	NL		4th	80	74	.519	25		
1944	1944	NL		2nd	90	63	.588	14½		
1945	1945	NL		4th	82	72	.532	16		
1946	1946	NL		7th	63	91	.409	34		
1947	1947	NL		7th	62	92	.403	32		
1948	1948	NL		4th	83	71	.539	8½		
1949	1949	NL		6th	71	83	.461	26		
1950	1950	NL		8th	57	96	.373	33½		
1951	1951	NL		7th	64	90	.416	32½		
1952	1952	NL		8th	42	112	.273	54½		
1953	1953	NL		8th	50	104	.325	55		
1954	1954	NL		8th	53	101	.344	44		
1955	1955	NL		8th	60	94	.390	38½		
1956	1956	NL		7th	66	88	.429	27		
1957	1957	NL		7th	62	92	.403	33		
1958	1958	NL		2nd	84	70	.545	8		
1959	1959	NL		4th	78	76	.506	9		
1960 †	1960	NL *		1st	95	59	.617	–	Won World Series (Yankees) 4–3 †	Dick Groat (MVP); Vern Law (CYA)^{[f]}
1961	1961	NL		6th	75	79	.487	18		
1962	1962	NL		4th	93	68	.578	8		
1963	1963	NL		8th	74	88	.457	25		
1964	1964	NL		6th	80	82	.494	13		
1965	1965	NL		3rd	90	72	.556	7		
1966	1966	NL		3rd	92	70	.568	3		Roberto Clemente (MVP)
1967	1967	NL		6th	81	81	.500	20½		
1968	1968	NL		6th	80	82	.494	17		
1969	1969	NL	East	3rd	88	74	.543	12		
1970	1970^{[q]}	NL	East ^	1st	89	73	.549	–	Lost NLCS^{[d]} (Reds) 3–0	
1971 †	1971	NL *	East ^	1st	97	65	.599	–	Won NLCS (Giants) 3–1; Won World Series (Orioles) 4–3 †	Roberto Clemente (WSMVP)
1972^{i}	1972	NL	East ^	1st	96	59	.619	–	Lost NLCS (Reds) 3–2	
1973	1973	NL	East	3rd	80	82	.494	2½		
1974	1974	NL	East ^	1st	88	74	.543	–	Lost NLCS (Dodgers) 3–1	
1975	1975	NL	East ^	1st	92	69	.571	–	Lost NLCS (Reds) 3–0	
1976	1976	NL	East	2nd	92	70	.568	9		
1977	1977	NL	East	2nd	96	66	.593	5		
1978	1978	NL	East	2nd	88	73	.547	1½		Dave Parker (MVP)
1979 †	1979	NL *	East ^	1st	98	64	.605	–	Won NLCS (Reds) 3–0; Won World Series (Orioles) 4–3 †	Willie Stargell (MVP, WSMVP)
1980	1980	NL	East	3rd	83	79	.512	8		
1981^{[j]}	1981	NL	East	4th	25	23	.521	5½		
1981^{[j]}	1981	NL	East	6th	21	33	.389	9½		
1982	1982	NL	East	4th	84	78	.519	8		
1983	1983	NL	East	2nd	84	78	.519	6		
1984	1984	NL	East	6th	75	87	.463	21½		
1985	1985	NL	East	6th	57	104	.354	43½		
1986	1986	NL	East	6th	64	98	.395	44		
1987	1987	NL	East	4th	80	82	.464	15		
1988	1988	NL	East	2nd	85	75	.531	15		
1989	1989	NL	East	5th	74	88	.457	19		
1990	1990	NL	East ^	1st	95	67	.586	–	Lost NLCS (Reds) 4–2	Barry Bonds (MVP); Doug Drabek (CYA); Jim Leyland (MOY)^{[g]}
1991	1991	NL	East ^	1st	98	64	.605	–	Lost NLCS (Braves) 4–3	
1992	1992	NL	East ^	1st	96	66	.593	–	Lost NLCS (Braves) 4–3	Barry Bonds (MVP); Jim Leyland (MOY)
1993	1993	NL	East	5th	75	87	.463	22		
1994^{[k]}	1994	NL	Central	4th	53	61	.465	13	Playoffs cancelled	
1995	1995	NL	Central	5th	58	86	.403	27		
1996	1996	NL	Central	5th	73	89	.451	15		
1997	1997	NL	Central	2nd	79	83	.488	5		
1998	1998	NL	Central	6th	69	93	.426	33		
1999	1999	NL	Central	3rd	78	84	.484	18½		
2000	2000^{[r]}	NL	Central	5th	69	93	.426	26		
2001	2001	NL	Central	6th	62	100	.383	31		
2002	2002	NL	Central	4th	72	89	.447	24½		
2003	2003	NL	Central	4th	75	87	.463	13		
2004	2004	NL	Central	5th	72	89	.447	32½		Jason Bay (ROY)
2005	2005	NL	Central	6th	67	95	.414	33		
2006	2006	NL	Central	5th	67	95	.414	16½		
2007	2007	NL	Central	6th	68	94	.420	17		
2008	2008	NL	Central	6th	67	95	.414	30½		
2009	2009	NL	Central	6th	62	99	.385	28½		
2010	2010	NL	Central	6th	57	105	.352	34		
2011	2011	NL	Central	4th	72	90	.444	24		
2012	2012	NL	Central	4th	79	83	.488	18		
2013	2013	NL	Central	2nd ¤	94	68	.580	3	Won NLWC (Reds); Lost NLDS (Cardinals) 3–2	Andrew McCutchen (MVP); Clint Hurdle (MOY); Francisco Liriano (CBPOY)
2014	2014	NL	Central	2nd ¤	88	74	.543	2	Lost NLWC (Giants)	
2015	2015	NL	Central	2nd ¤	98	64	.605	2	Lost NLWC (Cubs)	
2016	2016	NL	Central	3rd	78	83	.484	25		
2017	2017	NL	Central	4th	75	87	.463	17		
2018	2018	NL	Central	4th	82	79	.509	12½		
2019	2019	NL	Central	5th	69	93	.426	22		
2020	2020^{[t]}	NL	Central	5th	19	41	.317	15		
2021	2021	NL	Central	5th	61	101	.377	34		
2022	2022	NL	Central	4th	62	100	.383	31		
2023	2023	NL	Central	4th	76	86	.469	16		
2024	2024	NL	Central	5th	76	86	.469	17		Paul Skenes (ROY)
2025	2025	NL	Central	5th	71	91	.438	26		Paul Skenes (CYA)
2026	2026	NL	Central	3rd	82	80	.506	21		
Totals					W	L	Win%			
Totals					441	617	.417	Pittsburgh Alleghenys (AA/NL) regular season record (1882–90)		
Totals					10,246	10,030	.505	Pittsburgh /Pirates (NL) regular season record (1891–2021)		
Totals					10,687	10,647	.501	All-time regular season record (1882–2021)		
Totals					43	53	.448	All-time postseason record		
Totals					10,730	10,700	.501	All-time regular and postseason record		

These statistics are current as of October 3, 2021.

== Record by decade ==
The following table describes the Pirates' MLB win–loss record by decade.

Decade	Wins	Losses	Pct
1880s	418	504	.453
1890s	649	723	.473
1900s	938	538	.636
1910s	736	751	.495
1920s	877	656	.572
1930s	812	718	.531
1940s	756	776	.493
1950s	616	923	.400
1960s	848	755	.529
1970s	916	695	.569
1980s	732	825	.470
1990s	774	779	.498
2000s	681	936	.421
2010s	792	826	.489
2020s	447	585	.433
All-time	10,910	10,910	.500

These statistics are from Baseball-Reference.com's Pittsburgh Pirates History & Encyclopedia, and are current as of January 16, 2018.

== Postseason record by year ==
The Pirates have made the postseason seventeen times in their history, with their first being in 1903 and the most recent being in 2015.

Year	Finish	Round	Opponent	Result		
1903	National League Champions	World Series	Boston Americans	Lost	3	5
1909	World Series Champions	World Series	Detroit Tigers	Won	4	3
1925	World Series Champions	World Series	Washington Senators	Won	4	3
1927	National League Champions	World Series	New York Yankees	Lost	0	4
1960	World Series Champions	World Series	New York Yankees	Won	4	3
1970	National League Champions	NLCS	Cincinnati Reds	Lost	0	3
1971	World Series Champions	NLCS	San Francisco Giants	Won	3	1
1971	World Series Champions	World Series	Baltimore Orioles	Won	4	3
1972	National League East Champions	NLCS	Cincinnati Reds	Lost	2	3
1974	National League East Champions	NLCS	Los Angeles Dodgers	Lost	1	3
1975	National League East Champions	NLCS	Cincinnati Reds	Lost	0	3
1979	World Series Champions	NLCS	Cincinnati Reds	Won	3	0
1979	World Series Champions	World Series	Baltimore Orioles	Won	4	3
1990	National League East Champions	NLCS	Cincinnati Reds	Lost	2	4
1991	National League East Champions	NLCS	Atlanta Braves	Lost	3	4
1992	National League East Champions	NLCS	Atlanta Braves	Lost	3	4
2013	National League Wild Card	NLWC	Cincinnati Reds	Won	1	0
2013	National League Wild Card	NLDS	St. Louis Cardinals	Lost	2	3
2014	National League Wild Card	NLWC	San Francisco Giants	Lost	0	1
2015	National League Wild Card	NLWC	Chicago Cubs	Lost	0	1
17	Totals			8–12	43	53

== Footnotes ==
- ^{i} The 1972 Major League Baseball strike forced the cancellation of the first seven games (thirteen game-days) of the season.
- ^{j} The 1981 Major League Baseball strike caused the season to split into two halves. This caused Major League Baseball to hold the Divisional Series so that the first- and second-half champions could play each other to determine playoff spots for the NLCS and World Series.
- ^{k} The 1994–95 Major League Baseball strike ended the season on August 11, as well as cancelling the entire postseason.
- ^{l} The official Pirates website uses the spelling of "Alleghenies" rather than "Alleghenys".
- ^{s} The Pirates first season at PNC Park.
- ^{t} The 2020 Major League Baseball season was shortened to 60 games due to the COVID-19 global pandemic.
