= Tim Drummond (disambiguation) =

Tim Drummond (1940–2015) was an American musician.

Tim or Timothy Drummond may also refer to:

- Tim Drummond (baseball) (born 1964), American baseball player
- Timothy Drummond (born 1988), South African field hockey player
