= 1989 Houston Astros season =

1989 Houston Astros
- League: National League
- Division: West
- Ballpark: The Astrodome
- City: Houston, Texas
- Record: 86–76 (.531)
- Divisional place: 3rd
- Owners: John McMullen
- General managers: Bill Wood
- Managers: Art Howe
- Television: KTXH; HSE
- Radio: KTRH (Bill Brown, Milo Hamilton, Larry Dierker, Bruce Gietzen, Bill Worrell, Enos Cabell); KXYZ (Orlando Sánchez-Diago, Rolando Becerra)

The 1989 Houston Astros season was the 28th season for the Major League Baseball (MLB) franchise located in Houston, Texas, their 25th as the Astros, 28th in the National League (NL), 21st in the NL West division, and 25th at The Astrodome. The Astros entered the season having completed an 82–80 record, in fifth place and 12 1/2 games behind the division-champion and World Series-winning Los Angeles Dodgers.

On April 4, pitcher Mike Scott made his third consecutive Opening Day start for Houston, who hosted the Atlanta Braves and won, 10–3. The season was best remembered for the Astros winning 16 of 17 games in late May through mid June. During the amateur draft, the Astros selected pitcher Jeff Juden at 12th overall and Todd Jones (27th) in the first round, outfielder Brian Hunter in the second round, and pitcher Shane Reynolds in the third round.

Scott and first baseman Glenn Davis were selected to the MLB All-Star Game and played for the National League, the second career selection for both.

The Astros concluded the season with an 86–76 record, in third place and six games behind the division champion and NL pennant-winning San Francisco Giants. Scott led the NL in wins (20), while, following the season, catcher Craig Biggio received his first career Silver Slugger Award.

== Offseason ==
Former infielder Phil Garner was named to the Astros' coaching staff in 1989.

- November 22, 1988: Hired former first baseman/outfielder Bob Watson as assistant general manager. Watson, who had most recently served as hitting coach for the Oakland Athletics, played for Houston from 1966 to 1979.
- December 4, 1988: The Astros traded a player to be named later to the Minnesota Twins for Mark Portugal. The Astros completed the deal by sending Todd McClure (minors) to the Twins on December 7.
- December 21, 1988: Bob Forsch was signed as a free agent by the Astros.
- January 10, 1989: John Fishel, Mike Hook (minors), and Pedro DeLeon (minors) were traded by the Astros to the New York Yankees for Rick Rhoden.
- January 30, 1989: Dan Schatzeder was signed as a free agent by the Astros.
- February 16, 1989: Roger Mason was signed as a free agent with the Houston Astros.
- March 31, 1989: Dave Johnson and Victor Hithe (minors) were traded by the Astros to the Baltimore Orioles for Carl Nichols.
- April 3, 1989: Signed right-hander Mike Scott to a two-year extension—including incentives—worth up to $4.75 million.

== Regular season ==
=== Summary ===
==== April—May ====
Opening Day starting lineup
Uniform	Player	Position
2	Gerald Young	Center fielder
16	Rafael Ramírez	Shortstop
28	Billy Hatcher	Left fielder
27	Glenn Davis	First baseman
17	Kevin Bass	Right fielder
19	Bill Doran	Second baseman
11	Ken Caminiti	Third baseman
4	Craig Biggio	Catcher
33	Mike Scott	Pitcher
Venue: Astrodome • Final: Houston 10, Atlanta 3 Sources:

For the third consecutive season, right-hander Mike Scott, the 1986 NL Cy Young Award winner, handled the Opening Day start for Houston, while Art Howe made his managerial debut. The Astros hosted the Atlanta Braves to commence the 25th season of baseball at the Astrodome. The Braves, meanwhile, countered with Zane Smith, to make his first Opening Day start. During the first three frames, Scott allowed no runs while inducing four whiffs, all swinging. In the bottom of the second inning Glenn Davis struck the Astros' first home run of the season, 425 feet (130 m) deep to left-center field. Next, Kevin Bass and Ken Caminiti each singled, then Scott singled in both in for a 3–0 lead. Misplayed chances on the part of the Braves during the third inning keyed three more runs as the Astros built a 6–0 lead. The Braves scored twice in the fourth, and during the fifth, Scott struck out the side, but not before the Tommy Gregg homered to cut the Astros' lead to 6–3. Larry Andersen relieved Scott and tossed a scoreless top of the eighth inning to earn the hold, while the Astros bats struck for four more run in the bottom of the eighth to raise the lead to 10–3. Dave Smith pitched a scoreless ninth, appearing in his third consecutive Opening Day.

From May 7 to May 31, the Astros established a club record with a 10-game winning streak on the road.

Taking a no-hit bid into the eighth inning on May 19, Mike Scott surrendered a leadoff single to Glenn Wilson. This remained the lone hit for the Pittsburgh Pirates as Scott led the Astros to a 3–0 win, also the third one-hit complete game of Scott's career. Bill Doran swatted a bases loaded triple in the bottom of sixth inning and drove in all 3 runs. Along with his no-hitter in 1986, this performance signaled the fourth successive campaign for Scott having pitched either a no-hit or a one-hit shutout, a club record for most games of those criteria. (Note: Number of games in a career player meets criteria, in shutouts, playing for HOU, in the regular season, requiring hits allowed ≤ 1, sorted by descending instances.)

Starting May 26, the Astros embarked on a 10-game winning streak, which matched another Houston club record. Moreover, the win streak evolved into 16 of 17 games won through June 11, ten of which were by a margin of one run, and four by walk-off scenarios.

On May 27, Houston trailed heading into the bottom of the ninth, until infielder Glenn Davis connected for a two-out, two-run game-tying home run to take the game in extra innings. In the 12th, the Astros won on a walk-off when Rafael Ramírez singled home Davis.

==== June ====
The final two games of four-game set on June 3 and 4 against the Los Angeles Dodgers took so many extra innings that by themselves the lasted a span of four games. A 22-inning marathon unfolded at The Astrodome on June 3, taking seven hours and 14 minutes. This ended with a 5–4 Astros win when Ramírez' single grazed the glove of left-hander Fernando Valenzuela, who was filling in at first base, for the game-winning RBI, which was the longest game in major league history. The ninth consecutive win for the Astros, they pulled to 1 1/2 games behind the NL West-leading San Francisco Giants, while concluding at 2:50 AM. The first pitch for the series finale was just 10 hours later at 1 PM. For the first time at the Astrodome, two grand slams were hit. The Dodgers' Mike Scioscia hit a grand slam in top of the first inning, while the Astros' Louie Meadows countered with one in the bottom of fifth, his first home of the season and first—and only—career grand slam. In the top of the 13th, Astros ace Mike Scott (9–3) entered to make his first relief appearance since 1985, tossed a scoreless inning, and later earned the victory. Scott batted for himself in the bottom of the 13th and hit a sacrifice fly to drive home Ramírez for the walk-off run, a 7–6 final score and four-game sweep of the Dodgers. This was the Astros' 10 consecutive win.

On June 8, Glenn Davis swatted the third walk-off home run of his career, off Mark Davis. Entering play that day, the Astros had won 12 of 13 contests, climbing from fifth place in the National League West into a tie for first with a record of 33–25 (.569). They hosted San Diego, who occupied fourth place, four games back with a mark of 30-30. This was Houston's fourth walk-off victory in six games, during which they went 5–1, and each win was decided by one run.

On June 13, right fielder Terry Puhl played his 1,403rd game to pass Jack Graney for most all-time in the major leagues among Canadian-born players.

Mike Scott concluded June with a 6–1 win–loss record (W–L), 2.20 earned run average, three complete games, 26 strikeouts, 15 bases on balls, and .209 batting average against. Hence, Scott was recognized as NL Pitcher of the Month to become the first Astro to receive the award since Nolan Ryan for May 1984.

==== August—September ====
Reliever Dave Smith established an Astros club record by converting each of the first 21 save opportunities to start the season. This record stood until 2025, when Josh Hader extended his streak to 22.

On August 20, Kevin Bass hit a walk-off grand slam off Chicago Cubs closer Mitch Williams, the second of a switch-hit, two home-run bout for Bass. The slam secured an 8–4 win for the Astros; moreover, this was the first of two grand slams on the season by Bass that either secured a win or tied the game. In an all-round performance, Bass was 3-for-5 with 5 RBI. This was a club-record third switch-hit, multi-homer, performance for Bass, the first with a grand slam for an Astro, (Note: On May 2, 2017, Marwin González succeeded Bass as the next Astro to hit home runs from both sides of the plate, including a grand slam.) hit his first career grand slam and, at the time, the only Astro to have generated more than one. (Note: Bass had produced the two most-recent such outings, on August 3 and September 2, 1987. Ken Caminiti had the next for Houston, on July 3, 1994.) Ryne Sandberg homered twice for the Cubs, once off starter Mike Scott and again off Danny Darwin in the top of the ninth. Though charged with a blown save, Darwin earned the victory, bringing his record to an excellent 11–3 standing.

Bass was recognized with NL Player of the Week honors for the week ended August 20.

Infielder Rafael Ramírez led a near-Astros victory over the Cubs on August 29, when he set a club record with 7 runs batted in (RBI). He homered twice, including a grand slam, to power Houston to a 9–0 lead. However, the Astros wasted Ramírez' landmark day and the lead. The Cubs came all the way back to tie the game, and in the tenth inning, Dwight Smith singled off Dave Smith for the game-winning RBI and 10–9 final score. Houston slipped to five games behind San Francisco in the NL West division title race. Ramírez' performance surpassed Román Mejías' record 6 RBI, which he set in the first-ever game in franchise history, April 10, 1962, which also took place against the Cubs.

Mike Scott earned his 100th victory as an Astro on September 9 at the Astrodome, notching a three-hitter as Houston topped San Francisco, the NL West-division leader, 5–1. The win closed the Astros' gap to five games behind the Giants. Scott (19–8) struck out seven with 37,711 fans in attendance. He surrendered just two base on balls and earned a game score of 82. The Astros scored twice in the bottom if the first. Kevin Bass singled home Gerald Young. Glenn Wilson also singled off Giants starter Kelly Downs to score Bass.

On September 20, Kevin Bass hit his fourth career grand slam to tie with César Cedeño for third place all-time in team history, while trailing only Bob Aspromonte (six) and Bob Watson (five). It was the Astros' sixth grand slam of the season, breaking the club record.

==== Performance overview ====
The Astros concluded the season with a 86–76 record, in third place, and six games behind the division- and NL pennant-winning San Francisco Giants. An increase in wins by 4 from the year prior, it was the fourth time in club history that the Astros had won 86 games or more. The Astros hit a club-record six grand slams in 1989, surpassing five each by the 1970, 1973, and 1986 squads. (Note: Remained the team record until 2001 (seven grand slams).)

Meanwhile, Mike Scott became the fourth pitcher in club history to win 20 games in a single season, which led the National League. Scott became the second Astros pitcher to lead the league, following Joe Niekro in 1979 (21). Houston's other prior moundsmen who had breached the 20-win threshold included Larry Dierker (1969) and J. R. Richard (1976). Scott also attained his third campaign as an 18-game or higher winner, second in club history only to Richard, with four (1976–1979). (Note: Number of seasons player meets criteria, playing for HOU, in the regular season, requiring wins ≥ 18, sorted by descending instances.) Scott (1986) joined Richard (1978 and 1979) as Houston Astros who were 20-game winners and members of the 300 strikeout club, and as earned run average (ERA) leaders (Scott, 1986; Richard, 1979). Scott (September 25, 1986) also joined Dierker (July 9, 1976) as the only Astros to have won 20 contests and hurled a no-hitter. As the club's first Cy Young Award winner in 1986, Scott also became the first pitcher in franchise history to have claimed 20 victories in one campaign, fired a no-hitter, won an ERA title, and joined the 300-strikeout club.

Glenn Davis launched a career-best 34 home runs, which, as his third campaign with upward of 30 home runs (previously, 1986 and 1988), set a franchise record. (Note: Surpassed Jimmy Wynn, who slugged 37 home runs in 1967 and another 33 in 1969.)

Right-hander Larry Andersen yielded a 1.54 ERA, which led National League relief pitchers (minimum 81 innings pitched). This was also the lowest club history for minimum of 81 innings, and—at the time—second in Colt .45s/Astros franchise history to Don McMahon's 1.53 ERA in 1962 for all seasons with minimum 50 innings. In 2019, Will Harris yielded a 1.50 ERA to break McMahon's record.

Fellow reliever Danny Darwin became the first in club history to accumulate each of 100 innings pitched, 100 strikeouts, and sub-3.00 earned run average (ERA). Darwin was one of three Major League relievers to earn this distinction in 1989, along with Greg W. Harris of the San Diego Padres, and Rob Murphy of the Boston Red Sox.

Catcher Craig Biggio won his first career Silver Slugger Award, the fifth overall in club history, and the first at the position.

=== League standings ===
==== National League West ====
NL West
Team	W	L	Pct.	GB	Home	Road
San Francisco Giants	92	70	.568	—	53‍–‍28	39‍–‍42
San Diego Padres	89	73	.549	3	46‍–‍35	43‍–‍38
Houston Astros	86	76	.531	6	47‍–‍35	39‍–‍41
Los Angeles Dodgers	77	83	.481	14	44‍–‍37	33‍–‍46
Cincinnati Reds	75	87	.463	17	38‍–‍43	37‍–‍44
Atlanta Braves	63	97	.394	28	33‍–‍46	30‍–‍51

==== Record versus opponents ====
National League

1989 National League record Sources:
Team	ATL	CHC	CIN	HOU	LAD	MON	NYM	PHI	PIT	SD	SF	STL
Atlanta	—	5–7	8–10	8–10	6–10	6–6	2–10	8–4	4–8	7–11	6–12	3–9
Chicago	7–5	—	7–5	5–7	7–5	10–8	10–8	10–8	12–6	8–4	6–6	11–7
Cincinnati	10–8	5–7	—	8–10	8–10	4–8	4–8	4–8	7–5	9–9	8–10	8–4
Houston	10–8	7–5	10–8	—	10–8	4–8	6–6	9–3	7–5	8–10	8–10	7–5
Los Angeles	10–6	5–7	10–8	8–10	—	7–5	5–7	6–6	7–5	6–12	10–8	3–9
Montreal	6–6	8–10	8–4	8–4	5–7	—	9–9	9–9	11–7	5–7	7–5	5–13
New York	10–2	8–10	8–4	6–6	7–5	9–9	—	12–6	9–9	5–7	3–9	10–8
Philadelphia	4–8	8–10	8–4	3–9	6–6	9–9	6–12	—	10–8	2–10	4–8	7–11
Pittsburgh	8–4	6–12	5–7	5–7	5–7	7–11	9–9	8–10	—	3–9	5–7	13–5
San Diego	11–7	4–8	9–9	10–8	12–6	7–5	7–5	10–2	9–3	—	8–10	2–10
San Francisco	12–6	6–6	10–8	10–8	8–10	5–7	9–3	8–4	7–5	10–8	—	7–5
St. Louis	9–3	7–11	4–8	5–7	9–3	13–5	8–10	11–7	5–13	10–2	5–7	—

=== Notable transactions ===
- April 5, 1989: Greg Gross was signed as a free agent with the Houston Astros.
- April 6, 1989: Troy Afenir was traded by the Astros to the Oakland Athletics for Matt Sinatro.
- June 5, 1989: Jeff Juden was drafted by the Astros in the 1st round (12th pick) of the 1989 Major League Baseball draft. Player signed June 30, 1989.

=== Roster ===
1989 Houston Astros
Roster
Pitchers: 49 Juan Agosto; 47 Larry Andersen; 52 José Canó; 38 Jim Clancy; 44 Danny Darwin; 43 Jim Deshaies; 31 Bob Forsch; 39 Bob Knepper; 22 Roger Mason; 35 Brian Meyer; 51 Mark Portugal; 36 Rick Rhoden; 20 Dan Schatzeder; 33 Mike Scott; 45 Dave Smith	Catchers: 14 Alan Ashby; 7 Craig Biggio; 28 Carl Nichols; 9 Alex Treviño; Infielders: 11 Ken Caminiti; 27 Glenn Davis; 19 Bill Doran; 4 Steve Lombardozzi; 16 Rafael Ramírez; 12 Craig Reynolds; 10 Harry Spilman; 29 Ron Washington; 15 Eric Yelding	Outfielders: 23 Eric Anthony; 17 Kevin Bass; 42 Mark Davidson; 6 Greg Gross; 28 Billy Hatcher; 26 Louie Meadows; 21 Terry Puhl; 13 Glenn Wilson; 2 Gerald Young	Manager: 18 Art Howe; Coaches: 8 Yogi Berra; 48 Matt Galante; 3 Phil Garner; 55 Les Moss; 5 Ed Napoleon; 24 Ed Ott

== Player statistica ==
Table legend
League leader	Team leader	*	Left-handed batter or pitcher
League top ten	Leader in appearances at position	#	Switch hitter

=== Batting ===
Abbreviations key

- Pos. – primary position
- G — games played
- AB — at bats
- H — hits
- 2B — doubles
- HR — home runs
- RBI — runs batted in
- RBI — stolen bases
- AVG — batting average
- SLG — slugging percentage

==== Starters by position ====
Individual batting results
Pos.	Player	G	AB	H	2B	HR	RBI	SB	AVG	SLG
C	Craig Biggio	134	443	114	21	13	60	21	.257	.402
1B	Glenn Davis	158	581	156	26	34	89	4	.269	.492
2B	Bill Doran^{#}	142	507	111	25	8	58	22	.219	.323
3B	Ken Caminiti^{#}	161	585	149	31	10	72	3	.255	.369
SS	Rafael Ramírez	151	537	132	20	6	54	4	.246	.324
LF	Billy Hatcher	108	395	90	15	3	44	22	.228	.304
CF	Gerald Young^{#}	146	533	124	15	0	38	34	.233	.276
RF	Terry Puhl*	121	354	96	25	0	27	9	.271	.376

==== Other batters ====
Individual batting results
Player	G	AB	H	Avg.	HR	RBI
Kevin Bass^{#}	87	313	94	.300	5	44
Craig Reynolds*	101	189	38	.201	2	14
Alex Treviño	59	131	38	.290	2	16
Glenn Wilson	28	102	22	.216	2	15
Eric Yelding	70	90	21	.233	0	9
Greg Gross*	60	75	15	.200	0	4
Mark Davidson	33	65	13	.200	1	5
Alan Ashby^{#}	22	61	10	.164	0	3
Eric Anthony*	25	61	11	.180	4	7
Louie Meadows*	31	51	9	.176	3	10
Steve Lombardozzi	21	37	8	.216	1	3
Harry Spilman*	32	36	10	.278	0	3
Carl Nichols	8	13	1	.077	0	2
Ron Washington	7	7	1	.143	0	0

=== Pitching ===
Abbreviations key

- W — wins
- L — losses
- ERA — earned run average
- G — games pitched
- SV — saves
- IP — innings pitched
- SO — strikeouts

==== Starting pitchers ====
Individual pitching results
Player	G	IP	W	L	ERA	SO
Mike Scott	33	229.0	20	10	3.10	172
Jim Deshaies*	34	225.2	15	10	2.91	153
Jim Clancy	33	147.0	7	14	5.08	91
Bob Knepper*	22	113.0	4	10	5.89	45
Mark Portugal	20	108.0	7	1	2.75	86
Rick Rhoden	20	96.2	2	6	4.28	41

==== Other pitchers ====
Individual pitching results
Player	G	IP	W	L	ERA	SO
Bob Forsch	37	108.1	4	5	5.32	40
José Canó	6	23.0	1	1	5.09	8

==== Relief pitchers ====
Individual pitching results
Player	G	W	L	SV	ERA	SO
Dave Smith	52	3	4	25	2.64	31
Juan Agosto^	71	4	5	1	2.93	46
Danny Darwin	68	11	4	7	2.36	104
Larry Andersen	60	4	4	3	1.54	85
Dan Schatzeder*	36	4	1	1	4.45	46
Brian Meyer	12	0	1	1	4.50	13
Roger Mason	2	0	0	0	20.25	3
Greg Gross*	1	0	0	0	18.00	1
Craig Reynolds	1	0	0	0	27.00	0

== Awards and achievements ==
=== Grand slams ===
No.	Date	Astros batter	Venue	Inning	Pitcher	Opposing team	Box
1	June 4	Louie Meadows (Note: 1st MLB grand slam)	Astrodome	5	Tim Belcher	Los Angeles Dodgers	
2	June 11	Bill Doran	Astrodome	2	Charlie Puleo	Atlanta Braves	
3	August 20	Kevin Bass (Note: Switch-hit, multi-home run game)	Astrodome	9 (Note: Walk-off)	Mitch Williams	Chicago Cubs	
4	August 29	Rafael Ramírez	Wrigley Field	5	Dean Wilkins	Chicago Cubs	
5	September 14	Craig Biggio	Dodger Stadium	2	John Wetteland	Los Angeles Dodgers	
6	September 20	Kevin Bass	Atlanta–Fulton County Stadium	7 (Note: Tied score or took lead)	Mark Eichhorn	Atlanta Braves	

=== Pitching achievements ===
==== No-hit bids ====
Date	Starting pitcher (IP)	Relief pitcher(s) (IP)	No-hit IP	GS	Catcher	Batter	Score	Opponent	Box
May 19, 1989	Mike Scott (9)	—	7	89	Craig Biggio	Glenn Wilson	3–0	Pittsburgh Pirates	
Note: Includes those games started with 7 or more no-hit innings.

=== Awards ===
1989 Houston Astros award winners
Name of award		Recipient	Ref.
Fred Hartman Award for Long and Meritorious Service to Baseball		Vivian Smith	
Houston-Area Major League Player of the Year	TEX	Nolan Ryan	
Houston Astros Most Valuable Player (MVP)		Mike Scott	
MLB All-Star Game	Reserve infielder	Glenn Davis	
MLB All-Star Game	Reserve pitcher	Mike Scott	
National League (NL) Pitcher of the Month	June	Mike Scott	
National League (NL) Player of the Week	May 21	Bill Doran	
National League (NL) Player of the Week	July 16	Glenn Davis	
National League (NL) Player of the Week	July 30	Craig Biggio	
National League (NL) Player of the Week	August 20	Kevin Bass	
Silver Slugger Award	Catcher	Craig Biggio	
The Sporting News NL All-Star	Pitcher	Mike Scott	

Other awards results

Name of award	Voting recipient(s) (Team)	Ref.
NL Cy Young	1st—M. Davis (SDP) • 2nd—Scott (HOU)	
NL Manager of the Year	1st—Zimmer (CHC) • 4th—Howe (HOU)	
NL Most Valuable Player	1st—K. Mitchell (SFG) • 7th—G. Davis (HOU); Other Astros: 15th—Scott	

=== League leaders ===
NL batting leaders

- Caught stealing: Gerald Young (25—led MLB)

NL pitching leaders

- Wins: Mike Scott (20)

NL defensive leaders

- Stolen bases allowed as catcher: Craig Biggio (140)
- Errors as shortstop: Rafael Ramírez (30)
- Outfield assists: Gerald Young (15)
- Putouts as outfielder: Gerald Young (412)
- Double plays turned as outfielder: Gerald Young (5)
- Total zone runs as third baseman: Ken Caminiti (23)

== Minor league system ==
Level	Team	League	Manager
AAA	Tucson Toros	Pacific Coast League	Bob Skinner
AA	Columbus Mudcats	Southern League	Tom Wiedenbauer
A	Osceola Astros	Florida State League	Rick Sweet
A	Asheville Tourists	South Atlantic League	Jim Coveney
A-Short Season	Auburn Astros	New York–Penn League	Reggie Waller
Rookie	GCL Astros	Gulf Coast League	Julio Linares

== See also ==
- List of Major League Baseball annual wins leaders
