= 1989 Los Angeles Dodgers season =

1989 Los Angeles Dodgers
- League: National League
- Division: West
- Ballpark: Dodger Stadium
- City: Los Angeles
- Record: 77–83 (.481)
- Divisional place: 4th
- Owners: Peter O'Malley
- General managers: Fred Claire
- Managers: Tommy Lasorda
- Television: KTTV (11); Vin Scully, Ross Porter, Don Drysdale; Z Channel; Eddie Doucette, Don Sutton
- Radio: KABC; Vin Scully, Ross Porter, Don Drysdale; KWKW; Jaime Jarrín, René Cárdenas

The 1989 Los Angeles Dodgers season marked the 100th season for the franchise in Major League Baseball, having joined the National League in 1890 after six seasons in the American Association. It also marked their 32nd season in Los Angeles, California.

The team came down to earth after the success of the 1988 season, finishing further down in the standings falling to fourth place in the National League West.

== Offseason ==
- December 4, 1988: Acquired Eddie Murray from the Baltimore Orioles for Juan Bell, Brian Holton and Ken Howell.
- March 11, 1989: Acquired Mike Morgan from the Baltimore Orioles for Mike Devereaux.

== Regular season ==
=== Season standings ===
NL West
Team	W	L	Pct.	GB	Home	Road
San Francisco Giants	92	70	.568	—	53‍–‍28	39‍–‍42
San Diego Padres	89	73	.549	3	46‍–‍35	43‍–‍38
Houston Astros	86	76	.531	6	47‍–‍35	39‍–‍41
Los Angeles Dodgers	77	83	.481	14	44‍–‍37	33‍–‍46
Cincinnati Reds	75	87	.463	17	38‍–‍43	37‍–‍44
Atlanta Braves	63	97	.394	28	33‍–‍46	30‍–‍51

=== Record vs. opponents ===
1989 National League record Sources:
Team	ATL	CHC	CIN	HOU	LAD	MON	NYM	PHI	PIT	SD	SF	STL
Atlanta	—	5–7	8–10	8–10	6–10	6–6	2–10	8–4	4–8	7–11	6–12	3–9
Chicago	7–5	—	7–5	5–7	7–5	10–8	10–8	10–8	12–6	8–4	6–6	11–7
Cincinnati	10–8	5–7	—	8–10	8–10	4–8	4–8	4–8	7–5	9–9	8–10	8–4
Houston	10–8	7–5	10–8	—	10–8	4–8	6–6	9–3	7–5	8–10	8–10	7–5
Los Angeles	10–6	5–7	10–8	8–10	—	7–5	5–7	6–6	7–5	6–12	10–8	3–9
Montreal	6–6	8–10	8–4	8–4	5–7	—	9–9	9–9	11–7	5–7	7–5	5–13
New York	10–2	8–10	8–4	6–6	7–5	9–9	—	12–6	9–9	5–7	3–9	10–8
Philadelphia	4–8	8–10	8–4	3–9	6–6	9–9	6–12	—	10–8	2–10	4–8	7–11
Pittsburgh	8–4	6–12	5–7	5–7	5–7	7–11	9–9	8–10	—	3–9	5–7	13–5
San Diego	11–7	4–8	9–9	10–8	12–6	7–5	7–5	10–2	9–3	—	8–10	2–10
San Francisco	12–6	6–6	10–8	10–8	8–10	5–7	9–3	8–4	7–5	10–8	—	7–5
St. Louis	9–3	7–11	4–8	5–7	9–3	13–5	8–10	11–7	5–13	10–2	5–7	—

=== Notable games ===
- June 3–4, 1989: The Dodgers lost 5–4 in 22 innings to the Houston Astros when Jeff Hamilton allowed a RBI single to Rafael Ramírez, scoring Bill Doran. The game lasted 7 hours, 14 minutes and did not finish until 2:49 a.m. Central time (12:49 a.m. Pacific). KTTV, which normally aired a postgame show in this era, canceled it on this night and went straight to a newscast. Whether it was due to the length of the game or due to the confluence of two huge breaking news stories (the death of Ayatollah Khomeini and the Tiananmen Square massacre) was never publicly revealed.
- August 23–24, 1989: The Dodgers played another 22-inning game, this one against the Montreal Expos. It eventually ended when Rick Dempsey homered for the Dodgers in the top half of the 22nd inning off Expos pitcher Dennis Martínez, who was making a very rare relief performance; the Dodgers won 1–0 in what was the Expos' longest game ever. Rex Hudler would be caught stealing second in the bottom half of the 22nd to end the game. The game almost ended in the 16th when Larry Walker scored from third on a sacrifice fly. The Dodgers' appeal, that Walker left the base too soon, was recognized by the third base umpire and the third out was recorded. The game also marked the first time a mascot was ejected by an umpire. When Youppi! dressed in a nightgown and nightcap pretended to go to sleep on top of the Dodgers' dugout, Dodgers' manager Tommy Lasorda demanded that Youppi! be run from the game. In the end, the game took over 6 hours to finish and ended close to 2 a.m. Eastern time (11 p.m. PT).

== Opening Day lineup ==
Opening Day starters
Name	Position
Willie Randolph	Second baseman
Alfredo Griffin	Shortstop
Kirk Gibson	Left fielder
Eddie Murray	First baseman
Mike Marshall	Right fielder
John Shelby	Center fielder
Jeff Hamilton	Third baseman
Mike Scioscia	Catcher
Tim Belcher	Starting pitcher

== Roster ==
1989 Los Angeles Dodgers
Roster
Pitchers: 49 Tim Belcher; 52 Tim Crews; 51 Jeff Fischer; 46 Mike Hartley; 55 Orel Hershiser; 29 Ricky Horton; 50 Jay Howell; 54 Tim Leary; 48 Ramón Martínez; 36 Mike Morgan; 56 Mike Munoz; 26 Alejandro Peña; 59 Ray Searage; 30 John Tudor; 34 Fernando Valenzuela; 57 John Wetteland	Catchers: 17 Rick Dempsey; 25 Darrin Fletcher; 14 Mike Scioscia; Infielders: 10 Dave Anderson; 25 Mariano Duncan; 7 Alfredo Griffin; 3 Jeff Hamilton; 33 Eddie Murray; 12 Willie Randolph; 27 Mike Sharperson; 44 José Vizcaíno; 21 Tracy Woodson	Outfielders: 40 Billy Bean; 28 Kal Daniels; 20 Mike Davis; 23 Kirk Gibson; 38 José González; 15 Chris Gwynn; 29 Lenny Harris; 9 Mickey Hatcher; 45 Mike Huff; 5 Mike Marshall; 31 John Shelby; 22 Franklin Stubbs	Manager: 2 Tommy Lasorda; Coaches: 8 Joey Amalfitano (third base); 58 Mark Cresse (bullpen); 13 Joe Ferguson (first base); 35 Ben Hines (hitting); 11 Manny Mota; 16 Ron Perranoski (pitching); 18 Bill Russell (bench)

=== Notable transactions ===
- July 18, 1989: Acquired Kal Daniels and Lenny Harris from the Cincinnati Reds for Mariano Duncan and Tim Leary.
- July 18, 1989: Acquired Billy Bean from the Detroit Tigers for Domingo Michel and Steve Green.

== Player stats ==
=== Batting ===
==== Starters by position ====
Note: Pos = Position; G = Games played; AB = At bats; H = Hits; Avg. = Batting average; HR = Home runs; RBI = Runs batted in

Pos	Player	GP	AB	H	Avg.	HR	RBI
C	Mike Scioscia	133	408	102	.250	10	44
1B	Eddie Murray	160	594	147	.247	20	88
2B	Willie Randolph	145	549	155	.282	2	36
3B	Jeff Hamilton	151	548	134	.245	12	56
SS	Alfredo Griffin	136	506	125	.247	0	29
LF	Kirk Gibson	71	253	54	.213	9	28
CF	John Shelby	108	345	63	.183	1	12
RF	Mike Marshall	105	377	98	.260	11	42

==== Other batters ====
Note: G = Games played; AB = At bats; H = Hits; Avg. = Batting average; HR = Home runs; RBI = Runs batted in

Player	GP	AB	H	Avg.	HR	RBI
José González	95	261	70	.268	3	18
Mickey Hatcher	94	224	66	.295	2	25
Mike Davis	67	173	43	.249	5	19
Rick Dempsey	79	151	27	.179	4	16
Lenny Harris	54	147	37	.252	1	15
Dave Anderson	87	140	32	.229	1	14
Franklin Stubbs	69	103	30	.291	4	15
Mariano Duncan	49	84	21	.250	0	8
Billy Bean	51	71	14	.197	0	3
Chris Gwynn	32	68	16	.235	0	7
Kal Daniels	11	38	13	.342	2	8
Mike Sharperson	27	28	7	.250	0	5
Mike Huff	12	25	5	.200	1	2
José Vizcaíno	7	10	2	.200	0	0
Darrin Fletcher	5	8	4	.500	1	2
Tracy Woodson	4	6	0	.000	0	0

=== Pitching ===
==== Starting pitchers ====
Note: G = Games pitched; IP = Innings pitched; W = Wins; L = Losses; ERA = Earned run average; SO = Strikeouts

Player	G	IP	W	L	ERA	SO
Orel Hershiser	35	256.2	15	15	2.31	178
Tim Belcher	39	230.0	15	12	2.82	200
Fernando Valenzuela	31	196.2	10	13	3.43	116
Tim Leary	19	117.1	6	7	3.38	59
Ramón Martínez	15	98.2	6	4	3.19	89

==== Other pitchers ====
Note: G = Games pitched; IP = Innings pitched; W = Wins; L = Losses; ERA = Earned run average; SO = Strikeouts

Player	G	IP	W	L	ERA	SO
Mike Morgan	40	152.2	8	11	2.53	72
John Wetteland	31	102.2	5	8	3.77	96
John Tudor	6	14.1	0	0	3.14	9

==== Relief pitchers ====
Note: G = Games pitched; W = Wins; L = Losses; SV = Saves; ERA = Earned run average; SO = Strikeouts

Player	G	W	L	SV	ERA	SO
Jay Howell	56	5	3	28	1.58	55
Alejandro Peña	53	4	3	5	2.13	75
Tim Crews	44	0	1	1	3.21	56
Ray Searage	41	3	4	0	3.53	24
Ricky Horton	23	0	0	0	5.06	12
Mike Hartley	5	0	1	0	1.50	4
Mike Munoz	3	0	0	0	16.88	3
Jeff Fischer	2	0	0	0	13.50	2
Jeff Hamilton	1	0	1	0	5.40	2
Mickey Hatcher	1	0	0	0	9.00	0

== 1989 Awards ==
- 1989 Major League Baseball All-Star Game
  - Orel Hershiser reserve
  - Jay Howell reserve
  - Willie Randolph reserve
  - Mike Scioscia reserve
- NL Pitcher of the Month
  - Tim Belcher (September 1989)
- NL Player of the Week
  - José González (June 26 – July 2)
  - Jay Howell (July 31 – Aug. 6)
  - Tim Belcher (Aug. 21–27)

== Farm system ==
Level	Team	League	Manager
AAA	Albuquerque Dukes	Pacific Coast League	Kevin Kennedy
AA	San Antonio Missions	Texas League	John Shoemaker
**High A**	**Bakersfield Dodgers**	**California League**	**Tim Johnson**
High A	Vero Beach Dodgers	Florida State League	Joe Alvarez
A-Short Season	Salem Dodgers	Northwest League	Tom Beyers
**Rookie**	**Great Falls Dodgers**	**Pioneer League**	**Joe Vavra**
Rookie	Gulf Coast Dodgers	Gulf Coast League	Jerry Royster
Rookie	DSL Dodgers	Dominican Summer League	

Teams in BOLD won League Championships

== Major League Baseball draft ==
The Dodgers drafted 65 players in this draft. Of those, seven of them would eventually play Major League baseball. The Dodgers had three first round picks this season as they gained the New York Yankees first round pick and a supplemental pick for the loss of free agent Steve Sax. They also gained an extra second round pick from the Cleveland Indians as compensation for the loss of pitcher Jesse Orosco.

With their first pick in the 1st round, the Dodgers selected pitcher Kiki Jones from Hillsborough High School in Tampa, Florida. Despite concerns that he was too small to make it, the Dodgers drafted him and their scouting director said "he's got the best arm around and the best curveball in the country." He was 8–0 with a 1.58 ERA his first season in the rookie leagues with the Great Falls Dodgers but then began to experience arm injuries and legal problems. The Dodgers released him after the 1993 season, though he attempted comebacks in 1998–1999 and 2001. In 8 total minor league seasons he was 23–20 with a 4.13 ERA in 77 games (61 starts).

Their next first round pick was outfielder Tom Goodwin from California State University, Fresno. He would play 14 seasons in the Majors (5 of them with the Dodgers) and hit .268 while stealing 369 bases. The supplemental pick was pitcher Jamie McAndrew of the University of Florida. He was subsequently selected by the Florida Marlins in the 1992 expansion draft and eventually pitched in 15 games in the Majors with the Milwaukee Brewers in 1995 and 1997.

The most successful pick was Eric Young drafted in the 43rd round out of Rutgers University as an outfielder. He was selected by the Colorado Rockies in the 1992 expansion draft and spent most of his 15-season career as a second baseman. He hit .283 in 1,730 career games with 79 homers, 543 RBI and 465 steals while playing with seven different teams.

1989 draft picks

Round	Name	Position	School	Signed	Career span	Highest level
1	Kiki Jones	RHP	Hillsborough High School	Yes	1989–2001	AA
1	Tom Goodwin	OF	California State University, Fresno	Yes	1989–2005	**MLB**
1s	Jamie McAndrew	RHP	University of Florida	Yes	1989–1997	**MLB**
2	Bily Lott	OF	Petal High School	Yes	1989–1997	AAA
2	Stan Payne	LHP	Clarke Central High School	No; Athletics-1992	1992	A-
3	Phil Nevin	SS	El Dorado High School	No; Astros-1992	1993–2006	**MLB**
4	Javier De La Hoya	RHP	Grant High School	Yes	1989–2007	AAA
5	John Deutsch	1B	Montclair State University	Yes	1989–1993	AA
6	Tim Barker	SS	Virginia Commonwealth University	Yes	1989–1998	AAA
7	Bryan Baar	C	Western Michigan University	Yes	1989–1992	AAA
8	Jason Brosnan	LHP	California State University, Fresno	Yes	1989–2002	AAA
9	Barry Parisotto	RHP	Gonzaga University	Yes	1989–1993	A+
10	Kevin Jordan	2B	Cañada College	No; Yankees-1990	1990–2005	**MLB**
11	Dennis Burbank	RHP	Cypress College	No; Yankees-1991	1991–1993	A+
12	Garett Teel	C	William Paterson University	Yes	1989–1994	A+
13	Lee DeLoach	SS	Rutgers University–Camden	Yes	1989	Rookie
14	Michael Wismer	OF	Villanova University	Yes	1989–1990	A+
15	Keith Daniel	RHP	Pender High School	Yes	1989–1990	Rookie
16	Frank Humber	LHP	Wake Forest University	Yes	1989–1990	A+
17	Pete Gonzalez	C	Miami Dade College	Yes	1989–1996	AAA
18	Audelle Cummings	RHP	Ohio Dominican University	Yes	1989	Rookie
19	Michael Potthoff	RHP	University of Missouri	Yes	1989–1991	A+
20	Gary Forrester	SS	University of Nevada, Las Vegas	Yes	1989–1991	A+
21	Michael Galle	3B	Purdue University	Yes	1990–1991	A+
22	William Miller	OF	San Diego State University	Yes	1989–1990	A+
23	Craig White	SS	Slippery Rock University of Pennsylvania	Yes	1989–1990	A-
24	Red Peters	1B	California State University, Fullerton	Yes	1989–1991	AA
25	Javier Puchales	OF		Yes	1989–1995	AA
26	Craig Bishop	LHP	Erie Community College	Yes	1989–1994	A+
27	Raymond Bielanin	RHP	Niagara University	Yes	1989	Rookie
28	Ray Calhoun	RHP	Spartanburg Methodist College	Yes	1989–1992	AA
29	Tim Patrick	LHP	Sacramento City College	Yes	1989–1991	A+
30	Jerome Santivasci	RHP	Clemson University	No		
31	Darnell Whims	OF	Governor Thomas Johnson High School	Yes	1989	Rookie
32	Yale Fowler	OF	California State University, San Bernardino	Yes	1989–1990	A-
33	John Farren	C	Villanova University	No		
34	Matt Howard	2B	Pepperdine University	Yes	1989–1999	**MLB**
35	Al Drumheller	LHP	Shenandoah High School	No; Yankees – 1993	1993–2002	AAA
36	Stephen O'Donnell	1B	La Salle University	Yes	1989–1992	A+
37	Helmut Bohringer	3B	Adelphi University	Yes	1989–1991	A+
38	Daniel Stupur	2B	George Fox University	Yes	1989	A-
39	Joe Seals	C	Belmont University	Yes	1989–1996	Rookie
40	Jimmy Brown	SS	Carlos Escobar Lopez High School	Yes	1989–1991	A-
41	Ross Farnsworth	LHP	Pinole Valley High School	Yes	1990–1996	A+
42	Roger Sweeney	OF	San Rafael High School	No; Dodgers-1990	1991–1992	A-
43	Eric Young	OF	Rutgers, the State University of New Jersey	Yes	1989–2006	**MLB**
44	Garey Ingram	C	Middle Georgia College	Yes	1990–2002	**MLB**
45	Melvin Warren	OF	Fairfield High School	No; Dodgers-1990	1991–1992	Rookie
46	Ray Bowen	LHP	San Diego Mesa College	No		
47	Martin Kilian	RHP	San Jose City College	No		
48	Mark Lundeen	LHP	Napa High School	No		
49	Daniel Poulton	RHP	Minidoka High School	No		
50	Brannon Veal	OF	Middle Georgia College	No		
51	Patrick Reed	SS	Castlemont High School	No; Dodgers-1990	1991–1993	A-
52	Don Meyers	1B	Sacramento City College	Yes	1990–1992	A+
53	Gaither Bagsby	RHP	Roane State Community College	No		
54	Robert Hoffman	C	Contra Costa College	Yes	1990	Rookie
55	Timothy McDermott	C	Iowa Western Community College	No		
56	Brian Van Horn	LHP	Pinconning High School	No		
57	Richard Josepher	1B	St. Rita High School	No; Yankees-1993	1993	A-
58	Bradley Cohen	OF	Meridian Community College	No		
59	Charles Williams	OF	Lumberton High School	No		
60	Pete Altenberger	RHP	Purdue University	No		
61	Brent Prudhomme	1B	Butler County Community College	No		
62	Richard Crane	LHP	California State University, Fresno	Yes	1989–1991	A+
