= Johnny Ray (second baseman) =

American baseball player (born 1957)

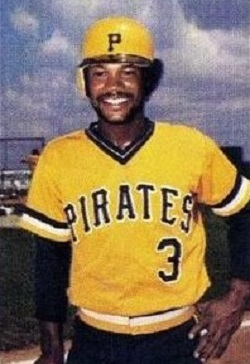
- Second baseman
- Born: March 1, 1957 (age 69); Chouteau, Oklahoma, U.S.
- Batted: Switch Threw: Right

Professional debut
- MLB: September 2, 1981, for the Pittsburgh Pirates
- NPB: April 6, 1991, for the Yakult Swallows

Last appearance
- MLB: September 30, 1990, for the California Angels
- NPB: July 16, 1992, for the Yakult Swallows

MLB statistics
- Batting average: .290
- Home runs: 53
- Runs batted in: 594

NPB statistics
- Batting average: .269
- Home runs: 13
- Runs batted in: 64
- Stats at Baseball Reference

Teams
- Pittsburgh Pirates (1981–1987); California Angels (1987–1990); Yakult Swallows (1991–1992)

Career highlights and awards
- All-Star (1988); Silver Slugger Award (1983)

Johnny Cornelius Ray (born March 1, 1957) is an American former second baseman and outfielder in Major League Baseball who had a 10-year career from 1981 to 1990. He played for the Pittsburgh Pirates of the National League and the California Angels of the American League. He also played two seasons for the Yakult Swallows in Japan in 1991 and 1992.

== Biography ==
Ray played college baseball for the University of Arkansas, finishing up in the 1979 College World Series for the runner-up Razorbacks. Ray was selected by the Houston Astros in the 12th round of the amateur baseball draft. He was traded to the Pirates on August 31, 1981, along with Randy Niemann for Phil Garner.

Ray became the Pirates' starting second baseman. As a rookie in 1982 he played in every game and was named the Rookie of the Year by The Sporting News, even though the Baseball Writers' Association of America selected Los Angeles Dodgers second baseman Steve Sax as the Rookie of the Year.

Besides, Ray continued his productive hitting, leading the league in doubles in 1983 and 1984. He then won the Silver Slugger Award for second baseman in 1983, and finished fifth in the league in batting average in 1984. By that time, the switch-hitting Ray was consistently one of the most difficult batters to strike out.

The Pirates, going with a youth movement, traded Ray to the Angels on August 29, 1987, for Miguel García and minor league prospect Bill Merrifield. García had a brief career in the major leagues while Merrifield never made it out of the minor leagues. Meanwhile, after narrowly missing making the All-Star team during a couple of seasons, Ray was finally chosen to the American League All-Star team in 1988. Ray also played some games in left field.

After his career in the Major Leagues, Ray played for two seasons with the Yakult Swallows in Japan. Since retiring, Ray returned to Chouteau, Oklahoma, where he was born, raised and still lives. As a mark of distinction, one roadside sign outside the eastern Oklahoma town reads "Chouteau, OK. Home of Johnny Ray."

== Career statistics ==
Career Hitting
G	AB	H	2B	3B	HR	R	RBI	SB	BB	SO	AVG	OBP	SLG	OPS
1,353	5,188	1,502	294	36	53	604	594	80	353	329	.290	.333	.391	.724

Preceded by Gary Carter	National League Player of the Month; April, 1986	Succeeded by Hubie Brooks
