= Cecilio Guante =

Dominican baseball player (born 1960)

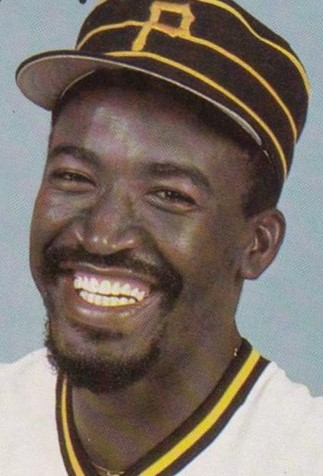
- Pitcher
- Born: February 1, 1960 (age 65); Villa Mella, Dominican Republic
- Batted: Right Threw: Right

MLB debut
- May 1, 1982, for the Pittsburgh Pirates

Last MLB appearance
- July 29, 1990, for the Cleveland Indians

MLB statistics
- Win–loss record: 29–34
- Earned run average: 3.48
- Strikeouts: 503
- Stats at Baseball Reference

Teams
- Pittsburgh Pirates (1982–1986); New York Yankees (1987–1988); Texas Rangers (1988–1989); Cleveland Indians (1990)
Medals
Men's baseball
Representing Dominican Republic
Pan American Games
Silver medal – second place	1979 San Juan	Team

Cecilio Guante Magallanes (born February 1, 1960) is a Dominican former professional baseball player. He made his Major League Baseball (MLB) debut with the Pittsburgh Pirates and ended his career after playing with the Cleveland Indians. He finished his career with a 29–34 won-loss record and a 3.48 earned run average. He worked exclusively as a relief pitcher (save for one start in 1990).

== Personal information ==
Guante was born in Villa Mella, Dominican Republic. His height is 6'3" and his playing weight was 205 lb. He was a right-handed pitcher and also a right-handed batter.

== Baseball career ==
Guante won a silver medal for the Dominican Republic at the 1979 Pan American Games and was signed as an amateur free agent by the Pittsburgh Pirates the same year. He was called up to the big leagues in 1982. He played five seasons for the Pirates, working exclusively as a relief pitcher. His strongest season was in 1985, when Guante posted a 4–6 record in 63 games. He pitched 109.0 innings, had 92 strikeouts, a 2.72 ERA and a 1.138 WHIP.

In 1987, Guante was traded to the New York Yankees, a team looking for pitching help. He was traded with Pat Clements and Rick Rhoden to the Yankees for Doug Drabek, Brian Fisher, and Logan Easley. Guante had a 5.73 ERA in 1987. By comparison, the average ERA for an American League pitcher in 1987 was 4.38. Though Guante had a statistically strong year in 1988 (5 wins and a 2.82 ERA), he was traded to the Texas Rangers for Dale Mohorcic before the season was over. Guante played two more full seasons before leaving MLB for good.

Guante briefly played for CPBL's Uni-President Lions in 1992 after leaving the major leagues.

Guante wore a giant G for Guante on his glove, as can be seen here.
