= Mackey Sasser =

American baseball player (born 1962)

- Catcher
- Born: August 3, 1962 (age 64); Fort Gaines, Georgia, U.S.
- Batted: Left Threw: Right

MLB debut
- July 17, 1987, for the San Francisco Giants

Last MLB appearance
- May 15, 1995, for the Pittsburgh Pirates

MLB statistics
- Batting average: .267
- Home runs: 16
- Runs batted in: 156
- Stats at Baseball Reference

Teams
- San Francisco Giants (1987); Pittsburgh Pirates (1987); New York Mets (1988–1992); Seattle Mariners (1993–1994); Pittsburgh Pirates (1995)

Mack Daniel Sasser (born August 3, 1962), nicknamed "the Hacker", is an American former professional baseball catcher who played in Major League Baseball from 1987 through 1995 for the San Francisco Giants, Pittsburgh Pirates, New York Mets and Seattle Mariners.

Sasser is known for the difficulty he regularly encountered in "double clutching" balls to the pitcher, although he performed competently as a catcher otherwise. He appeared in 534 games in his career, getting 317 hits with sixteen home runs, 156 runs batted in and a career .267 batting average.

== Early career ==
Born in Fort Gaines, Georgia, Sasser played college baseball at Wallace Community College in Dothan, Alabama and was drafted in the fifth round of the 1984 Major League Baseball draft by the San Francisco Giants. He debuted in the major leagues with the Giants on July 17, 1987, appearing in two games before being traded to the Pittsburgh Pirates with cash for pitcher Don Robinson, where he played 12 games during the remainder of the 1987 season.

== Mets career ==
On March 26, 1988, Sasser was traded to the New York Mets with pitcher Tim Drummond for former Mets prospect first baseman, Randy Milligan and a minor league player. With the Mets he was used as a backup for catcher Gary Carter for two seasons before playing 100 games in the 1990 season. That year he had 83 hits and a .307 batting average. After a serious collision with Jim Presley of the Atlanta Braves at home plate, Sasser began to hesitate and repeat his motion when returning the ball to the pitcher, a normally routine activity (he did not have this problem when throwing to second base on an attempted stolen base). In 1991, he played 96 games for a .272 batting average and in 1992 he went back to a backup role where he played in 92 games for only 141 at-bats and a .241 batting average.

== Later career ==
Sasser was granted free agent status after the 1992 season, signing a two-year contract with the Seattle Mariners. He appeared in 83 games as a backup in the 1993 season where he hit for only a .218 batting average. Seattle demoted him to third-string catcher after that season, appearing in only three games with them in the 1994 season, going hitless in three games before getting released. Sasser then signed a contract with the San Diego Padres on May 20, 1994, but was released a month later without playing in a game. Sasser re-signed with the Pirates for the 1995 season and played in fourteen games, getting four hits in 26 at-bats before being released in mid-May and retired as an active player.

After his playing career, Sasser became a baseball coach at Wallace Community College in Dothan, Alabama as well as athletic director of the college in 2011. He retired at the conclusion of the 2022 season after 25 years as the head baseball coach for the Governors.

After experiencing difficulty throwing batting practice to his players, he was finally able to overcome the problem with help from psychotherapist David Grand.
