= Brett Gideon =

American baseball player (born 1963)

- Pitcher
- Born: August 8, 1963; Ozona, Texas, U.S.
- Batted: Right Threw: Right

MLB debut
- July 5, 1987, for the Pittsburgh Pirates

Last MLB appearance
- April 10, 1990, for the Montreal Expos

MLB statistics
- Win–loss record: 1–5
- Earned run average: 4.46
- Strikeouts: 33
- Stats at Baseball Reference

Teams
- Pittsburgh Pirates (1987); Montreal Expos (1989–1990)

Byron Brett Gideon (born August 8, 1963) is an American former Major League Baseball player. A pitcher, Gideon played for the Pittsburgh Pirates and Montreal Expos.

A 1987 single in his only at-bat left Gideon with a rare MLB career batting average of 1.000.
