= Steve Carter (baseball) =

American baseball player (born 1964)

- Outfielder
- Born: December 3, 1964 (age 60); Charlottesville, Virginia
- Batted: Right Threw: Right

MLB debut
- April 16, 1989, for the Pittsburgh Pirates

Last MLB appearance
- October 3, 1990, for the Pittsburgh Pirates

MLB statistics
- Batting average: .143
- Home runs: 1
- Runs: 2
- Stats at Baseball Reference

Teams
- Pittsburgh Pirates (1989–1990)

Steven Jerome Carter (born December 3, 1964) is an American former Major League Baseball player from Charlottesville, Virginia who appeared in 14 games for the Pittsburgh Pirates from 1989 to 1990. A 1983 graduate of Albemarle High School, Carter was drafted by the Pittsburgh Pirates in the 17th round of the 1987 amateur draft out of the University of Georgia.

Carter is now the Acting Executive Director of the Parks and Recreation Foundation for Maryland National Capital Park and Planning Commission.
