= Rafael Ramírez (baseball) =

Dominican baseball player (born 1958)

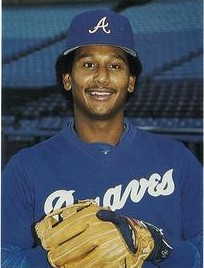
- Shortstop
- Born: February 18, 1958 (age 67); San Pedro de Macorís, Dominican Republic
- Batted: Right Threw: Right

MLB debut
- August 4, 1980, for the Atlanta Braves

Last MLB appearance
- October 3, 1992, for the Houston Astros

MLB statistics
- Batting average: .261
- Home runs: 53
- Runs batted in: 484
- Stats at Baseball Reference

Teams
- Atlanta Braves (1980–1987); Houston Astros (1988–1992)

Career highlights and awards
- All-Star (1984)

Rafael Emilio Ramírez Peguero (born February 18, 1958) is a Dominican former professional baseball player. He played in Major League Baseball (MLB) from 1980 to 1992, primarily as a shortstop. Ramirez made his major league debut on August 4, 1980, for the Atlanta Braves and played his final game on October 3, 1992, as a member of the Houston Astros.

== Career ==
One of many MLB players from the town of San Pedro de Macorís, Dominican Republic, Ramirez was the Braves' shortstop from 1981 to 1986, hitting quite well for his position while leading NL shortstops in double plays four straight years, but also errors five straight years. He made the NL All-Star team in 1984 with a .304 average at mid-season, but in 1987 torn knee ligaments limited him to only 56 games and he was traded to Houston after the season. With the Astros in 1988, Ramirez posted his best batting average since 1983 (.276) and drove in a career-high 59 runs. After that, his production slipped, with his batting average never again rising above .261, and plummeting as low as .236 in 1991. He retired following the 1992 season.

== Sources ==
- Career statistics from MLB · Baseball Reference · Fangraphs · Retrosheet
