= Dorn Taylor =

American baseball player (born 1958)

- Pitcher
- Born: August 11, 1958 (age 67); Abington, Pennsylvania, U.S.
- Batted: Right Threw: Right

MLB debut
- April 30, 1987, for the Pittsburgh Pirates

Last MLB appearance
- September 30, 1990, for the Baltimore Orioles

MLB statistics
- Win–loss record: 3–5
- Earned run average: 5.45
- Strikeouts: 44
- Stats at Baseball Reference

Teams
- Pittsburgh Pirates (1987, 1989); Baltimore Orioles (1990)

Donald Clyde Taylor (born August 11, 1958) is an American former professional baseball pitcher. He pitched parts of three seasons in the Major League Baseball (MLB), 1987 and 1989 for the Pittsburgh Pirates and 1990 for the Baltimore Orioles. He coached baseball at Bishop McDevitt High School in Glenside, Pennsylvania for several years after retiring.

Taylor played college baseball before flunking out of school, after which he spent three years working as a janitor and playing semi-pro baseball before catching on with the Pittsburgh Pirates.

== Sources ==
- Career statistics from Baseball Reference · Baseball Reference (Minors) · Retrosheet · Baseball Almanac, or Retrosheet
