= Brian Fisher (baseball) =

American baseball player (born 1962)

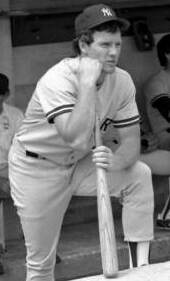
- Fisher with the New York Yankees in 1985
- Pitcher
- Born: March 18, 1962 (age 64); Honolulu, Hawaii, U.S.
- Batted: Right Threw: Right

MLB debut
- May 7, 1985, for the New York Yankees

Last MLB appearance
- October 4, 1992, for the Seattle Mariners

MLB statistics
- Win–loss record: 36–34
- Earned run average: 4.39
- Strikeouts: 370
- Stats at Baseball Reference

Teams
- New York Yankees (1985–1986); Pittsburgh Pirates (1987–1989); Houston Astros (1990); Seattle Mariners (1992)

Brian Kevin Fisher (born March 18, 1962) is an American former Major League Baseball pitcher. He played seven seasons in the major leagues for the New York Yankees, Pittsburgh Pirates, Houston Astros, and Seattle Mariners.

== Amateur career ==
Fisher attended William C. Hinkley High School in Aurora, Colorado. He helped Hinkley win the big-school state title in 1979.

Fisher attended Columbia College and the University of Denver.

== Professional career ==
The Atlanta Braves selected Fisher in the second round of the 1980 MLB draft. He played his first professional season with their Rookie league Gulf Coast Braves in 1980 and his last season with the San Francisco Giants' Triple-A Phoenix Firebirds in 1993. Atlanta traded him to the Yankees in December 1984 for Rick Cerone. He made his MLB debut in May 1985 and had his best season as a reliever in his rookie season, going 4–4 with a 2.38 earned run average.

After the 1986 season, the Yankees traded him with Doug Drabek and Logan Easley to the Pirates for Pat Clements, Cecilio Guante, and Rick Rhoden. He was a spot starter for Pittsburgh, winning a career-high 11 MLB games in 189 1/3 innings pitched in 1987. Fisher broke a bone in his right knee in 1989, limiting him to 9 MLB games.

Fisher signed with Houston ahead of the 1990 season, pitching in four games for the Astros. He pitched for the hometown Denver Zephyrs in the minors in 1991. He returned to the majors in 1992 with the Mariners, who acquired him from the Cincinnati Reds. Knee issues forced him to retire in 1993.

== Personal life ==
In 1997, Fisher's six-year-old child died of cerebral palsy.

Fisher lives in Aurora, Colorado, with his wife and two children.
