= Logan Easley =

American baseball player (born 1961)

- Pitcher
- Born: November 4, 1961 (age 64); Salt Lake City, Utah, U.S.
- Batted: Right Threw: Right

MLB debut
- April 9, 1987, for the Pittsburgh Pirates

Last MLB appearance
- May 28, 1989, for the Pittsburgh Pirates

MLB statistics
- Win–loss record: 2–1
- Earned run average: 5.12
- Strikeouts: 27
- Stats at Baseball Reference

Teams
- Pittsburgh Pirates (1987–1989)

Kenneth Logan Easley (born November 4, 1961) is an American former Major League Baseball player. A pitcher, Easley played for the Pittsburgh Pirates in 1987 and 1989.

Prior to his major league career Easley was a key member of the College of Southern Idaho baseball team in Twin Falls, Idaho, which won the NJCAA national championship in 1984.

== Professional career ==
Easley was drafted by the New York Yankees in the 20th round of the 1981 amateur draft. He was traded to the Pittsburgh Pirates in November 1986 along with Brian Fisher and Doug Drabek for Pat Clements, Cecilio Guante and Rick Rhoden.

Easley made his MLB debut in April 1987 against the New York Mets. He played 17 games for the Pirates in 1987 before being released in November. Easley was re-signed as a free agent the next month, but spent the 1988 season with the minor league Buffalo Bisons. He appeared in 10 games for the Pirates in the 1989 season, but was released a second and final time in November 1989. He spent the rest of his career in the minor leagues and retired in 1991.

Easley played for several minor league teams throughout his career. In addition to the Buffalo Bisons, Easley also played for the Albany-Colonie Yankees (now the Albany A's), the Vancouver Canadians, the Denver Zephyrs (now the New Orleans Zephyrs), the Reno Silver Sox and ultimately finished his career with the Canton/Akron Indians (now the Akron Aeros).

== Retirement ==
After retiring from baseball Easley returned to the Twin Falls, Idaho, area. He serves on the geology faculty at the College of Southern Idaho.

Easley's younger sister, Lori Easley Otter, is the former First Lady of Idaho.
