= John Sanders (sportscaster) =

American sports announcer (1943–2026)

John Sanders

John Sanders (1943 – June 10, 2026) was an American sports broadcaster, with over 25 years' experience commentating Major League Baseball games. He spent 16 years as a television announcer for the Cleveland Indians. Previously, he was on both television and radio broadcasts for the Pittsburgh Pirates. Sanders also called Big East football and basketball games through the mid-2010s.

== Career ==
Sanders, a Kansas native, worked at WIBW-TV in Topeka, Kansas. He then moved to KMBC-TV in Kansas City, Missouri, where he spent 12 years. While at KMBC, he did play-by-play for preseason telecasts of the Kansas City Chiefs.

In 1978, he moved to KDKA-TV in Pittsburgh, Pennsylvania, as weekend sports anchor. He later became sports director, appearing on the station's 6 and 11 o'clock newscasts. Then, in October 1980, KDKA announced that he would join Pirates broadcast legend Lanny Frattare for televised games during the 1981 season. He continued on the Pirates' broadcast team for nine seasons.

In 1991, Sanders moved to Cleveland to do television play-by-play for the Cleveland Indians on FSN Ohio. Following the 2006 season, the team declined to renew his contract.

== Personal life and death ==
Sanders and his wife, Cherie, had two daughters. He died on June 10, 2026, at the age of 83.
