= Doug Drabek =

American baseball player & coach (born 1962)

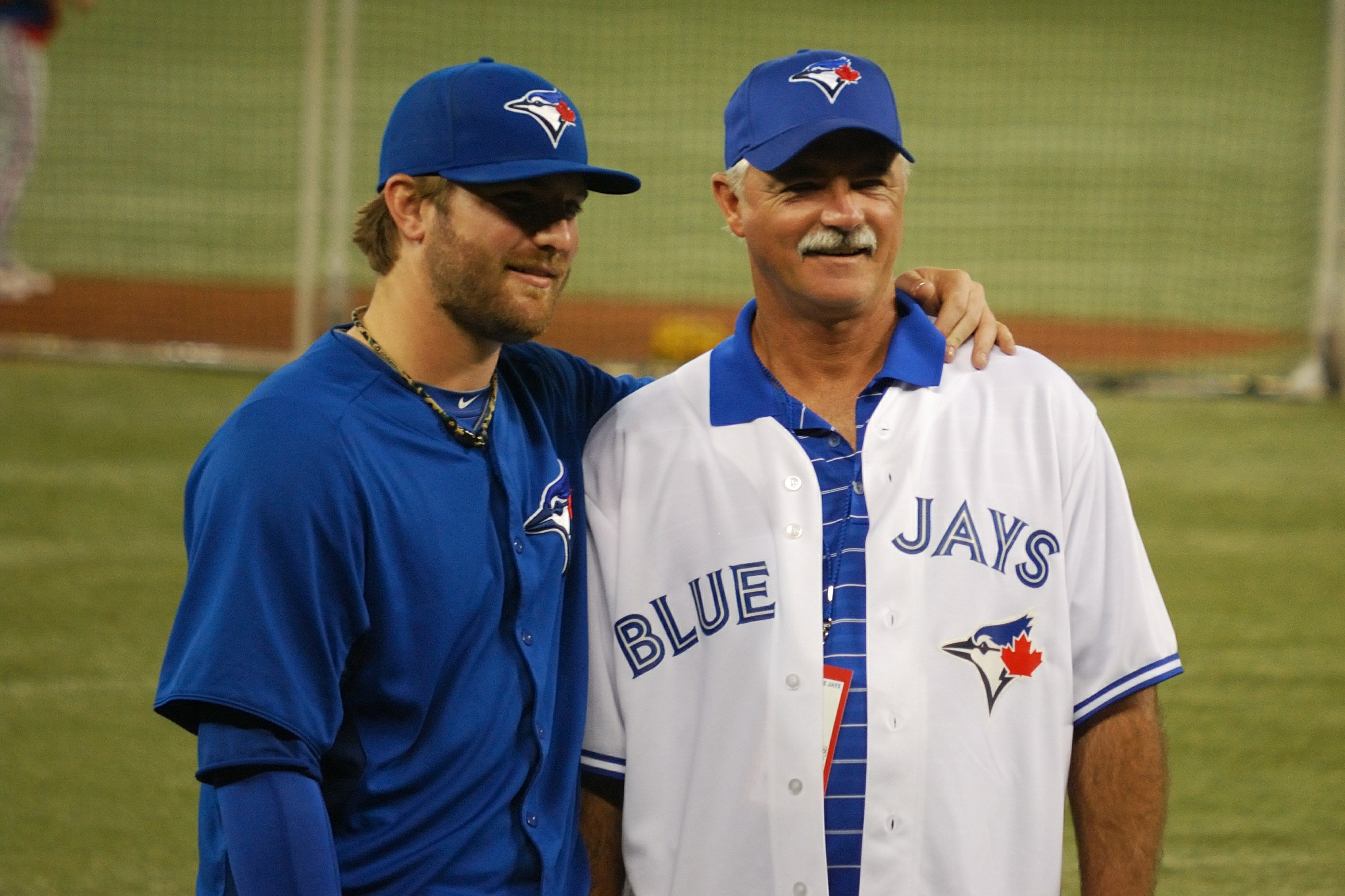
- Doug Drabek (right) with his son, Kyle, in 2012
- Pitcher
- Born: July 25, 1962 (age 64); Victoria, Texas, U.S.
- Batted: Right Threw: Right

MLB debut
- May 30, 1986, for the New York Yankees

Last MLB appearance
- September 25, 1998, for the Baltimore Orioles

MLB statistics
- Win–loss record: 155–134
- Earned run average: 3.73
- Strikeouts: 1,594
- Stats at Baseball Reference

Teams
- New York Yankees (1986); Pittsburgh Pirates (1987–1992); Houston Astros (1993–1996); Chicago White Sox (1997); Baltimore Orioles (1998)

Career highlights and awards
- All-Star (1994); NL Cy Young Award (1990); NL wins leader (1990)

Douglas Dean Drabek (/ˈdreɪbɛk/ DRAY-bek; born July 25, 1962) is an American former professional baseball pitcher, and a current minor league baseball coach. He is the pitching coach for the Reno Aces, the Triple-A affiliate of the Arizona Diamondbacks of Major League Baseball (MLB). He played in MLB for the New York Yankees, Pittsburgh Pirates, Houston Astros, Chicago White Sox and Baltimore Orioles between 1986 and 1998. Drabek batted and threw right-handed. Known for his fluid pitching motion and sound mechanics, he won the National League Cy Young Award in 1990. Drabek was an MLB All-Star in 1994.

== Early life ==
Drabek was born in Victoria, Texas. He attended St. Joseph High School in Victoria, where he played football and baseball. Drabek was drafted by the Cleveland Indians in the 4th round of the June 1980 MLB draft, but did not sign. He attended the University of Houston and played three seasons for the Cougars baseball team. Following his junior year, Drabek was drafted by the Chicago White Sox in the 11th round of the June 1983 MLB draft and signed on June 11.

== Career ==
After signing with the White Sox, Drabek was assigned to the Niagara Falls Sox in the short-season New York-Penn League where he finished 6–7 with a 3.67 earned run average (ERA) in 16 games with 103 strikeouts in 103 2/3 innings. After pitching one game for the Single-A Appleton Foxes, Drabek was promoted to the Double-A Glens Falls White Sox and was 12–5 with a 2.24 ERA. On August 13, he was traded to the New York Yankees along with Kevin Hickey to complete an earlier deal made on July 18 for Roy Smalley. Drabek then spent the rest of the 1984 season with the Double-A Nashville Sounds. In 1985, Drabek returned to Double-A and spent the entire season at Albany-Colonie in the Eastern League and finished with a 13–7 record with a 2.99 ERA with 153 strikeouts in 192 2/3 innings. After starting the 1986 season a with the Triple-A Columbus Clippers, Drabek made his Major League debut on May 30, coming in relief for starter Joe Niekro in a 6–3 loss to the Oakland Athletics. He would spend the rest of the season with the Yankees, appearing in 27 games (21 starts) and go 7–8 with a 4.10 ERA.

Following the 1986 season, the Yankees traded Drabek with Logan Easley and Brian Fisher to the Pittsburgh Pirates for Rick Rhoden, Cecilio Guante and Pat Clements. Drabek enjoyed his best years with Pittsburgh, from 1987 to 1992, during which time he regularly pitched over 230 innings and consistently finished in the top 10 in the National League ERA race. He went 22–6 with a 2.76 ERA in 1990 en route to winning the National League Cy Young Award and leading the Pirates to the postseason (where they lost in the NLCS to the Cincinnati Reds). His 22 wins that year were a league high; it was also 7 more wins than his previous single-season mark. On August 3, 1990, while with the Pirates, Drabek had a no-hitter broken up by a Sil Campusano single with two out in the ninth. The hit was the only one Drabek would allow in defeating the Philadelphia Phillies 11–0.

Drabek signed as a free agent after the 1992 season with the Houston Astros. Despite a solid 3.79 ERA and playing for a rising team, he posted a 9–18 record and led the National League in losses. He improved in the strike-shortened 1994 season to 12–6 with a 2.84 ERA, and was named an All-Star for the first and only time in his career.

When play resumed after the players' strike in 1995, however, he was unable to maintain his success and retired after the 1998 season, having compiled a 35–40 record over his final four seasons.

== Retirement and personal life ==
After retiring, Drabek coached his son's Little League and select league teams, often teaching them how to hit faster pitches with their personal pitching machine, giving them an advantage over other little league teams. Drabek returned to professional baseball in 2010, accepting a position in the Arizona Diamondbacks system as the pitching coach for the Yakima Bears in the Low-A Northwest League. On December 31, 2010, the D-backs announced that Drabek was promoted to the pitching coach for the Visalia Rawhide in the Single-A California League.

Drabek is married to Kristy and has three children; sons Justin (born 1986) and Kyle (born 1987) and daughter Kelsey (born 1991). Justin spent time playing in independent ball. Kyle was a starting pitcher who played for the Arizona Diamondbacks, Chicago White Sox, and Toronto Blue Jays.

In February 2018, Drabek was named as the pitching coach for the Double-A Jackson Generals. He served as the pitching coach for the Amarillo Sod Poodles in 2019.

Drabek was named as the pitching coach of the Triple-A Reno Aces prior to the 2024 season.

== See also ==
- Houston Astros award winners and league leaders
