= Miguel García (baseball) =

Venezuelan baseball player (born 1967)

Miguel Garcia
- Pitcher
- Born: April 3, 1967 (age 58); Caracas, Venezuela
- Batted: Left Threw: Left

MLB debut
- April 30, 1987, for the California Angels

Last MLB appearance
- July 22, 1989, for the Pittsburgh Pirates

MLB statistics
- Win–loss record: 0–2
- Earned run average: 8.41
- Strikeouts: 11

CPBL statistics
- Win–loss record: 0–1
- Earned run average: 3.97
- Strikeouts: 6
- Stats at Baseball Reference

Teams
- California Angels (1987); Pittsburgh Pirates (1987–1989); Brother Elephants (1991)

Miguel Angel García Sifontes (born April 3, 1967) is a Venezuelan former Major League Baseball left-handed relief pitcher who played for the California Angels (1987) and Pittsburgh Pirates (1987–1989).

In three seasons, García compiled a 0–2 record with 11 strikeouts and an 8.41 earned run average in 20⅓ innings pitched. He owns a perfect MLB batting average of 1.000, hitting a single during his only career at-bat in 1989.

== Personal life ==
Garcia and his wife Adrianna have two grown daughters, Mariangelica and Anacorina.

== See also ==
- List of players from Venezuela in Major League Baseball
