= Tim Drummond (baseball) =

American baseball player (born 1964)

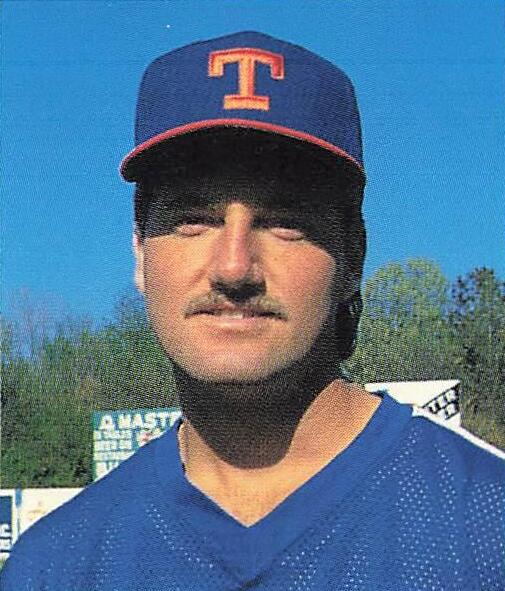
- Drummond with the Tidewater Tides c. 1988
- Pitcher
- Born: December 24, 1964 (age 61); La Plata, Maryland, U.S.
- Batted: Right Threw: Right

MLB debut
- September 12, 1987, for the Pittsburgh Pirates

Last MLB appearance
- September 28, 1990, for the Minnesota Twins

MLB statistics
- Win–loss record: 3–5
- Earned run average: 4.29
- Strikeouts: 63
- Stats at Baseball Reference

Teams
- Pittsburgh Pirates (1987); Minnesota Twins (1989–1990)

Timothy Darnell Drummond (born December 24, 1964) is an American former Major League Baseball pitcher. He played during three seasons at the major league level for the Pittsburgh Pirates and Minnesota Twins. He was signed by the Pirates in the 12th round of the 1983 amateur draft. Drummond played his first professional season with their Rookie league Gulf Coast Pirates in 1983, and split his last season between the Baltimore Orioles' Double-A Hagerstown Suns and Triple-A Rochester Red Wings and the Cincinnati Reds' Triple-A Nashville Sounds in 1992.
