= 1989 Philadelphia Phillies season =

1989 Philadelphia Phillies
- League: National League
- Division: East
- Ballpark: Veterans Stadium
- City: Philadelphia
- Owners: Bill Giles
- General managers: Lee Thomas
- Managers: Nick Leyva
- Television: WTAF (Harry Kalas, Richie Ashburn, Andy Musser); PRISM (Andy Musser, Chris Wheeler, Garry Maddox)
- Radio: WCAU (Harry Kalas, Richie Ashburn, Andy Musser, Chris Wheeler)

The 1989 Philadelphia Phillies season was the 107th season in the history of the franchise, and the 19th season for the Philadelphia Phillies at Veterans Stadium. The Phillies finished in sixth place in the National League East for the second consecutive season. It would also be Mike Schmidt's final season.

== Offseason ==
- October 24, 1988: Shane Rawley and cash were traded by the Phillies to the Minnesota Twins for Tom Nieto, Eric Bullock and Tom Herr.
- December 7, 1988: Kent Tekulve was released by the Philadelphia Phillies.
- December 7, 1988: Greg A. Harris was signed as a free agent with the Philadelphia Phillies.
- December 8, 1988: Phil Bradley was traded by the Phillies to the Baltimore Orioles for Gordon Dillard and Ken Howell.
- December 16, 1988: Milt Thompson was traded by the Phillies to the St. Louis Cardinals for Steve Lake and Curt Ford.
- January 11, 1989: Steve Stanicek was signed as a free agent by the Phillies.

== Regular season ==
Injuries to Mike Schmidt's shoulder caused him to miss much of the 1988 season. After a poor start to the 1989 season, Schmidt chose to suddenly announce his retirement in San Diego, on May 29. Known as "Captain Cool" by many in Philadelphia sports circles, Schmidt surprised many with an emotional, and occasionally tearful, retirement speech. In honor of his career, fans voted Schmidt to the NL All-Star team; Schmidt declined to play but was announced with the team. His last game was May 28, 1989, against the San Francisco Giants.

The Phillies played 163 regular season games due to a tie game on June 5 when they hosted the Pittsburgh Pirates. With the score tied 3–3, the game ended due to rain after only 8 innings had been played. Under the playing rules in place at the time, all player and team statistics generated during the tie game would stand (except since neither team had won, there could not be a winning or losing pitcher); a replacement game would be played at a later date. This game would mark the last regular-season tie game for the Phillies as playing rules changed in 2007 allowing tie games to continue from the point of interruption at a later date.

On June 8, 1989, Steve Jeltz hit two of his five career home runs in a game against the Pittsburgh Pirates, despite not starting the game. A switch-hitter, Jeltz hit one of these homers from the right side of the plate and one from the left side. This was the first time in the history of the Phillies that this feat had been accomplished. It was in this same game that, after the Pirates scored 10 runs in the top of the first, Pirate broadcaster Jim Rooker said on-air, "If we lose this game, I'll walk home." The Phillies came back to win 15–11, and after the season Rooker conducted a 300-mile charity walk from Philadelphia to Pittsburgh.

**Steve**
**Carlton**
LHP
Retired 1989

=== Season standings ===
NL East
| Team | W | L | Pct. | GB | Home | Road |
|---|---|---|---|---|---|---|
| Chicago Cubs | 93 | 69 | .574 | — | 48‍–‍33 | 45‍–‍36 |
| New York Mets | 87 | 75 | .537 | 6 | 51‍–‍30 | 36‍–‍45 |
| St. Louis Cardinals | 86 | 76 | .531 | 7 | 46‍–‍35 | 40‍–‍41 |
| Montreal Expos | 81 | 81 | .500 | 12 | 44‍–‍37 | 37‍–‍44 |
| Pittsburgh Pirates | 74 | 88 | .457 | 19 | 39‍–‍42 | 35‍–‍46 |
| Philadelphia Phillies | 67 | 95 | .414 | 26 | 38‍–‍42 | 29‍–‍53 |

=== Record vs. opponents ===
1989 National League record Sources:
| Team | ATL | CHC | CIN | HOU | LAD | MON | NYM | PHI | PIT | SD | SF | STL |
|---|---|---|---|---|---|---|---|---|---|---|---|---|
| Atlanta | — | 5–7 | 8–10 | 8–10 | 6–10 | 6–6 | 2–10 | 8–4 | 4–8 | 7–11 | 6–12 | 3–9 |
| Chicago | 7–5 | — | 7–5 | 5–7 | 7–5 | 10–8 | 10–8 | 10–8 | 12–6 | 8–4 | 6–6 | 11–7 |
| Cincinnati | 10–8 | 5–7 | — | 8–10 | 8–10 | 4–8 | 4–8 | 4–8 | 7–5 | 9–9 | 8–10 | 8–4 |
| Houston | 10–8 | 7–5 | 10–8 | — | 10–8 | 4–8 | 6–6 | 9–3 | 7–5 | 8–10 | 8–10 | 7–5 |
| Los Angeles | 10–6 | 5–7 | 10–8 | 8–10 | — | 7–5 | 5–7 | 6–6 | 7–5 | 6–12 | 10–8 | 3–9 |
| Montreal | 6–6 | 8–10 | 8–4 | 8–4 | 5–7 | — | 9–9 | 9–9 | 11–7 | 5–7 | 7–5 | 5–13 |
| New York | 10–2 | 8–10 | 8–4 | 6–6 | 7–5 | 9–9 | — | 12–6 | 9–9 | 5–7 | 3–9 | 10–8 |
| Philadelphia | 4–8 | 8–10 | 8–4 | 3–9 | 6–6 | 9–9 | 6–12 | — | 10–8 | 2–10 | 4–8 | 7–11 |
| Pittsburgh | 8–4 | 6–12 | 5–7 | 5–7 | 5–7 | 7–11 | 9–9 | 8–10 | — | 3–9 | 5–7 | 13–5 |
| San Diego | 11–7 | 4–8 | 9–9 | 10–8 | 12–6 | 7–5 | 7–5 | 10–2 | 9–3 | — | 8–10 | 2–10 |
| San Francisco | 12–6 | 6–6 | 10–8 | 10–8 | 8–10 | 5–7 | 9–3 | 8–4 | 7–5 | 10–8 | — | 7–5 |
| St. Louis | 9–3 | 7–11 | 4–8 | 5–7 | 9–3 | 13–5 | 8–10 | 11–7 | 5–13 | 10–2 | 5–7 | — |

=== Notable transactions ===
- June 1, 1989: Shane Turner was traded by the Phillies to the Baltimore Orioles for John Posey (minors).
- June 2, 1989: Chris James was traded by the Phillies to the San Diego Padres for John Kruk and Randy Ready.
- June 18, 1989: Juan Samuel was traded by the Phillies to the New York Mets for Lenny Dykstra, Roger McDowell and a player to be named later. The Mets completed the trade by sending Tom Edens to the Phillies on July 27.
- June 18, 1989: Steve Bedrosian and a player to be named later were traded by the Phillies to the San Francisco Giants for Charlie Hayes, Dennis Cook and Terry Mulholland. The Phillies completed the deal by sending Rick Parker to the Giants on August 7.
- August 7, 1989: Greg A. Harris was selected off waivers by the Boston Red Sox from the Philadelphia Phillies.

=== Game log ===
1989 game log (Overall Record: 67–95–1)
April (11–12)

| # | Date | Opponent | Score | Win | Loss | Save | Attendance | Record |
|---|---|---|---|---|---|---|---|---|
| 1 | April 4 | @ Cubs | 4–5 | Rick Sutcliffe (1–0) | **Floyd Youmans** (0–1) | Mitch Williams (1) | 33,361 | 0–1 |
| 2 | April 5 | @ Cubs | 12–4 | **Ken Howell** (1–0) | Greg Maddux (0–1) | **Mike Maddux** (1) | 18,674 | 1–1 |
| 3 | April 6 | @ Cubs | 8–3 | **Steve Ontiveros** (1–0) | Paul Kilgus (0–1) | None | 6,364 | 2–1 |
| – | April 7 | Cardinals | Postponed (rain); Makeup: June 20 as a traditional double-header | | | | | |
| 4 | April 8 | Cardinals | 5–4 (11) | **Jeff Parrett** (1–0) | John Costello (0–1) | None | 23,741 | 3–1 |
| 5 | April 9 | Cardinals | 3–15 | Joe Magrane (1–1) | **Bruce Ruffin** (0–1) | None | 31,631 | 3–2 |
| 6 | April 10 | Expos | 7–6 | **Steve Bedrosian** (1–0) | Gene Harris (1–1) | None | 13,194 | 4–2 |
| 7 | April 11 | Expos | 6–2 | **Steve Ontiveros** (2–0) | Pascual Pérez (0–1) | None | 14,429 | 5–2 |
| 8 | April 12 | Expos | 6–3 | **Don Carman** (1–0) | Kevin Gross (1–1) | **Steve Bedrosian** (1) | 15,461 | 6–2 |
| 9 | April 14 | Cubs | 4–6 | Scott Sanderson (1–0) | **Bruce Ruffin** (0–2) | Mitch Williams (5) | 20,851 | 6–3 |
| – | April 15 | Cubs | Postponed (rain); Makeup: July 31 as a traditional double-header | | | | | |
| 10 | April 16 | Cubs | 3–5 | Rick Sutcliffe (3–0) | **Floyd Youmans** (0–2) | Mitch Williams (6) | 32,249 | 6–4 |
| 11 | April 17 | @ Mets | 2–5 | Sid Fernandez (1–0) | **Don Carman** (1–1) | Randy Myers (2) | 28,087 | 6–5 |
| 12 | April 18 | @ Mets | 7–1 | **Larry McWilliams** (1–0) | Ron Darling (0–3) | None | 26,300 | 7–5 |
| 13 | April 19 | @ Mets | 2–4 | Randy Myers (1–1) | **Steve Bedrosian** (1–1) | None | 25,694 | 7–6 |
| 14 | April 20 | @ Pirates | 9–4 | **Ken Howell** (2–0) | Mike Dunne (1–1) | None | 6,977 | 8–6 |
| 15 | April 21 | @ Pirates | 3–2 | **Floyd Youmans** (1–2) | Doug Drabek (1–1) | **Steve Bedrosian** (2) | 15,221 | 9–6 |
| 16 | April 22 | @ Pirates | 3–4 | Jeff Robinson (2–2) | **Don Carman** (1–2) | None | 14,669 | 9–7 |
| 17 | April 23 | @ Pirates | 4–6 | Logan Easley (1–0) | **Steve Bedrosian** (1–2) | None | 16,816 | 9–8 |
| 18 | April 24 | @ Astros | 8–4 | **Greg A. Harris** (1–0) | Bob Forsch (0–1) | None | 9,088 | 10–8 |
| 19 | April 25 | @ Astros | 1–4 | Mike Scott (3–1) | **Ken Howell** (2–1) | None | 12,584 | 10–9 |
| 20 | April 26 | @ Astros | 5–6 | Danny Darwin (2–1) | **Jeff Parrett** (1–1) | Dave Smith (3) | 11,195 | 10–10 |
| 21 | April 28 | Reds | 0–3 | José Rijo (1–0) | **Don Carman** (1–3) | John Franco (7) | 23,052 | 10–11 |
| 22 | April 29 | Reds | 8–0 (5) | **Mike Maddux** (1–0) | Danny Jackson (0–1) | None | 23,156 | 11–11 |
| 23 | April 30 | Reds | 3–5 | Rob Dibble (3–0) | **Larry McWilliams** (1–1) | John Franco (8) | 43,605 | 11–12 |

May (7–19)

| # | Date | Opponent | Score | Win | Loss | Save | Attendance | Record |
|---|---|---|---|---|---|---|---|---|
| – | May 1 | Astros | Postponed (rain); Makeup: July 13 as a traditional double-header | | | | | |
| 24 | May 2 | Astros | 4–12 | Jim Deshaies (3–2) | **Floyd Youmans** (1–3) | None | 15,832 | 11–13 |
| 25 | May 3 | @ Braves | 3–6 | John Smoltz (4–2) | **Don Carman** (1–4) | None | 4,143 | 11–14 |
| 26 | May 4 | @ Braves | 0–3 | Tom Glavine (4–0) | **Mike Maddux** (1–1) | None | 2,047 | 11–15 |
| 27 | May 5 | @ Reds | 7–0 | **Ken Howell** (3–1) | Tom Browning (3–2) | None | 17,901 | 12–15 |
| 28 | May 6 | @ Reds | 4–7 | Rick Mahler (4–3) | **Larry McWilliams** (1–2) | John Franco (10) | 21,541 | 12–16 |
| 29 | May 7 | @ Reds | 5–0 | **Alex Madrid** (1–0) | Jack Armstrong (0–1) | None | 24,839 | 13–16 |
| 30 | May 9 | Braves | 2–7 | John Smoltz (5–2) | **Don Carman** (1–5) | None | 11,544 | 13–17 |
| – | May 10 | Braves | Postponed (rain); Makeup: June 30 as a traditional double-header | | | | | |
| 31 | May 11 | Braves | 3–8 | Tom Glavine (5–0) | **Randy O'Neal** (0–1) | None | 14,841 | 13–18 |
| 32 | May 12 | Dodgers | 3–0 | **Ken Howell** (4–1) | Tim Leary (2–3) | **Steve Bedrosian** (3) | 23,292 | 14–18 |
| 33 | May 13 | Dodgers | 2–0 | **Larry McWilliams** (2–2) | Tim Belcher (2–4) | None | 30,294 | 15–18 |
| 34 | May 14 | Dodgers | 0–9 | Orel Hershiser (5–3) | **Alex Madrid** (1–1) | None | 29,092 | 15–19 |
| 35 | May 15 | Giants | 3–2 (12) | **Steve Bedrosian** (2–2) | Craig Lefferts (1–1) | None | 15,703 | 16–19 |
| 36 | May 16 | Giants | 5–13 | Atlee Hammaker (2–3) | **Mike Maddux** (1–2) | None | 14,074 | 16–20 |
| 37 | May 17 | Giants | 0–6 | Rick Reuschel (7–2) | **Ken Howell** (4–2) | None | 18,943 | 16–21 |
| 38 | May 19 | Padres | 2–8 | Ed Whitson (6–2) | **Larry McWilliams** (2–3) | None | 28,224 | 16–22 |
| 39 | May 20 | Padres | 2–3 | Dennis Rasmussen (2–4) | **Don Carman** (1–6) | Greg W. Harris (3) | 28,866 | 16–23 |
| 40 | May 21 | Padres | 3–1 | **Bob Sebra** (1–0) | Walt Terrell (3–5) | **Steve Bedrosian** (4) | 38,346 | 17–23 |
| 41 | May 23 | @ Dodgers | 4–1 | **Ken Howell** (5–2) | Fernando Valenzuela (0–4) | **Steve Bedrosian** (5) | 32,199 | 18–23 |
| 42 | May 24 | @ Dodgers | 2–4 | Tim Leary (3–3) | **Larry McWilliams** (2–4) | Jay Howell (7) | 37,089 | 18–24 |
| 43 | May 25 | @ Dodgers | 6–7 | Tim Belcher (4–4) | **Don Carman** (1–7) | Jay Howell (8) | 27,781 | 18–25 |
| 44 | May 26 | @ Giants | 1–6 | Scott Garrelts (3–1) | **Bob Sebra** (1–1) | None | 12,787 | 18–26 |
| 45 | May 27 | @ Giants | 2–6 | Atlee Hammaker (4–3) | **Alex Madrid** (1–2) | Craig Lefferts (8) | 18,325 | 18–27 |
| 46 | May 28 | @ Giants | 5–8 | Rick Reuschel (9–2) | **Ken Howell** (5–3) | Mike LaCoss (6) | 51,498 | 18–28 |
| 47 | May 29 | @ Padres | 0–1 | Bruce Hurst (5–3) | **Larry McWilliams** (2–5) | Mark Davis (16) | 21,161 | 18–29 |
| 48 | May 30 | @ Padres | 3–9 | Ed Whitson (8–2) | **Don Carman** (1–8) | None | 11,710 | 18–30 |
| 49 | May 31 | @ Padres | 1–2 | Greg W. Harris (1–2) | **Jeff Parrett** (1–2) | Mark Davis (17) | 15,768 | 18–31 |

June (9–17–1)

| # | Date | Opponent | Score | Win | Loss | Save | Attendance | Record |
|---|---|---|---|---|---|---|---|---|
| 50 | June 2 | Expos | 1–2 (13) | Steve Frey (1–0) | **Greg A. Harris** (1–1) | Joe Hesketh (2) | 20,560 | 18–32 |
| 51 | June 3 | Expos | 5–7 | Kevin Gross (6–3) | **Larry McWilliams** (2–6) | Tim Burke (12) | 35,269 | 18–33 |
| 52 | June 4 | Expos | 4–7 | Dennis Martínez (5–1) | **Don Carman** (1–9) | Andy McGaffigan (2) | 30,926 | 18–34 |
| 53 | June 5 | Pirates | 3–3 (8) | None | None | None | 17,696 | 18–34–1 |
| 54 | June 6 | Pirates | 9–4 | **Bob Sebra** (2–1) | Brian Fisher (0–2) | **Jeff Parrett** (1) | 16,783 | 19–34–1 |
| 55 | June 7 | Pirates | 7–5 | **Jeff Parrett** (2–2) | Bob Kipper (0–3) | **Steve Bedrosian** (6) | 15,480 | 20–34–1 |
| 56 | June 8 | Pirates | 15–11 | **Don Carman** (2–9) | Jeff Robinson (2–6) | None | 18,511 | 21–34–1 |
| 57 | June 9 | @ Expos | 0–5 | Dennis Martínez (6–1) | **Floyd Youmans** (1–4) | None | 15,791 | 21–35–1 |
| 58 | June 10 | @ Expos | 1–9 | Bryn Smith (6–2) | **Bruce Ruffin** (0–3) | None | 23,981 | 21–36–1 |
| 59 | June 11 | @ Expos | 2–7 | Pascual Pérez (3–7) | **Bob Sebra** (2–2) | None | 34,365 | 21–37–1 |
| 60 | June 13 | @ Pirates | 10–2 | **Ken Howell** (6–3) | Morris Madden (1–1) | None | 11,570 | 22–37–1 |
| 61 | June 14 | @ Pirates | 4–6 | John Smiley (6–2) | **Don Carman** (2–10) | Bill Landrum (2) | 7,407 | 22–38–1 |
| 62 | June 15 | @ Pirates | 3–5 | Doug Drabek (4–5) | **Bob Sebra** (2–3) | Bill Landrum (3) | 15,428 | 22–39–1 |
| 63 | June 16 | Mets | 11–15 | Randy Myers (6–2) | **Steve Bedrosian** (2–3) | None | 33,135 | 22–40–1 |
| 64 | June 17 | Mets | 0–1 | Bob Ojeda (4–6) | **Larry McWilliams** (2–7) | None | 46,570 | 22–41–1 |
| 65 | June 18 | Mets | 6–5 | **Jeff Parrett** (3–2) | Randy Myers (6–3) | None | 43,689 | 23–41–1 |
| 66 | June 20 (1) | Cardinals | 4–6 | Ken Hill (4–4) | **Terry Mulholland** (0–1) | Ken Dayley (5) | see 2nd game | 23–42–1 |
| 67 | June 20 (2) | Cardinals | 3–5 | Frank DiPino (4–0) | **Steve Ontiveros** (2–1) | Todd Worrell (8) | 27,285 | 23–43–1 |
| – | June 21 | Cardinals | Postponed (rain); Makeup: September 15 as a traditional double-header | | | | | |
| 68 | June 22 | Cardinals | 11–2 | **Dennis Cook** (2–0) | José DeLeón (8–6) | None | 26,006 | 24–43–1 |
| 69 | June 23 | @ Mets | 3–9 | Bob Ojeda (5–6) | **Ken Howell** (6–4) | Randy Myers (10) | 44,828 | 24–44–1 |
| 70 | June 24 | @ Mets | 2–4 | Ron Darling (5–5) | **Floyd Youmans** (1–5) | Randy Myers (11) | 48,323 | 24–45–1 |
| 71 | June 25 | @ Mets | 1–5 | Sid Fernandez (5–2) | **Terry Mulholland** (0–2) | None | 47,692 | 24–46–1 |
| 72 | June 26 | @ Cardinals | 5–4 | **Jeff Parrett** (4–2) | Todd Worrell (1–2) | **Roger McDowell** (5) | 32,723 | 25–46–1 |
| 73 | June 27 | @ Cardinals | 4–2 | **Dennis Cook** (3–0) | José DeLeón (8–7) | **Roger McDowell** (6) | 30,482 | 26–46–1 |
| 74 | June 28 | @ Cardinals | 1–2 | Joe Magrane (7–6) | **Ken Howell** (6–5) | None | 37,018 | 26–47–1 |
| 75 | June 30 (1) | Braves | 4–2 | **Terry Mulholland** (1–2) | Zane Smith (1–12) | **Jeff Parrett** (2) | see 2nd game | 27–47–1 |
| 76 | June 30 (2) | Braves | 1–3 | Derek Lilliquist (5–4) | **Larry McWilliams** (2–8) | Joe Boever (13) | 25,586 | 27–48–1 |

July (15–14)

| # | Date | Opponent | Score | Win | Loss | Save | Attendance | Record |
|---|---|---|---|---|---|---|---|---|
| 77 | July 1 | Braves | 4–2 | **Bruce Ruffin** (1–3) | Pete Smith (2–9) | **Roger McDowell** (7) | 33,045 | 28–48–1 |
| 78 | July 2 | Braves | 1–3 | John Smoltz (10–6) | **Dennis Cook** (3–1) | None | 28,524 | 28–49–1 |
| 79 | July 3 | Reds | 2–1 | **Ken Howell** (7–5) | José Rijo (7–6) | **Roger McDowell** (8) | 56,498 | 29–49–1 |
| 80 | July 4 | Reds | 1–2 | Tom Browning (7–6) | **Terry Mulholland** (1–3) | John Franco (22) | 14,636 | 29–50–1 |
| 81 | July 5 | Reds | 3–2 (10) | **Roger McDowell** (2–5) | John Franco (2–2) | None | 11,935 | 30–50–1 |
| 82 | July 6 | @ Braves | 4–0 | **Bruce Ruffin** (2–3) | Pete Smith (2–10) | **Jeff Parrett** (3) | 6,544 | 31–50–1 |
| 83 | July 7 | @ Braves | 3–5 | John Smoltz (11–6) | **Dennis Cook** (3–2) | Joe Boever (14) | 11,450 | 31–51–1 |
| 84 | July 8 | @ Braves | 3–4 | Paul Assenmacher (1–2) | **Jeff Parrett** (4–3) | Joe Boever (15) | 21,337 | 31–52–1 |
| 85 | July 9 | @ Braves | 4–3 (13) | **Jeff Parrett** (5–3) | Joe Boever (2–3) | None | 9,292 | 32–52–1 |
| – | July 11 | **1989 Major League Baseball All-Star Game at Anaheim Stadium in Anaheim** | | | | | | |
| 86 | July 13 (1) | Astros | 11–4 | **Bruce Ruffin** (3–3) | Bob Knepper (3–10) | **Greg A. Harris** (1) | see 2nd game | 33–52–1 |
| 87 | July 13 (2) | Astros | 0–3 | Bob Forsch (2–2) | **Dennis Cook** (3–3) | Dave Smith (19) | 22,771 | 33–53–1 |
| 88 | July 14 | Astros | 4–2 | **Jeff Parrett** (6–3) | Larry Andersen (2–2) | None | 32,300 | 34–53–1 |
| 89 | July 15 | Astros | 6–9 | Mark Portugal (1–1) | **Larry McWilliams** (2–9) | None | 25,574 | 34–54–1 |
| – | July 16 | Astros | Postponed (rain); Makeup: July 22 as a traditional double-header | | | | | |
| 90 | July 17 | @ Reds | 4–1 | **Ken Howell** (8–5) | Ron Robinson (0–1) | **Roger McDowell** (9) | 24,167 | 35–54–1 |
| 91 | July 18 | @ Reds | 6–5 | **Todd Frohwirth** (1–0) | Danny Jackson (6–10) | **Roger McDowell** (10) | 19,970 | 36–54–1 |
| 92 | July 19 | @ Reds | 9–4 | **Dennis Cook** (4–3) | Tom Browning (7–9) | None | 17,739 | 37–54–1 |
| 93 | July 21 | @ Astros | 2–4 | Mike Scott (15–15) | **Terry Mulholland** (1–4) | Dave Smith (20) | 25,501 | 37–55–1 |
| 94 | July 22 (1) | @ Astros | 0–1 | Jim Deshaies (10–4) | **Ken Howell** (8–6) | Dave Smith (21) | see 2nd game | 37–56–1 |
| 95 | July 22 (2) | @ Astros | 3–4 | Danny Darwin (10–2) | **Larry McWilliams** (2–10) | None | 35,803 | 37–57–1 |
| 96 | July 23 | @ Astros | 2–3 | Bob Forsch (3–3) | **Bruce Ruffin** (3–4) | Larry Andersen (2) | 20,222 | 37–58–1 |
| 97 | July 24 | @ Expos | 3–4 (12) | Andy McGaffigan (3–4) | **Greg A. Harris** (1–2) | None | 25,218 | 37–59–1 |
| 98 | July 25 | @ Expos | 0–2 | Mark Langston (12–8) | **Don Carman** (2–11) | None | 30,103 | 37–60–1 |
| 99 | July 26 | @ Expos | 4–3 | **Jeff Parrett** (7–3) | Zane Smith (1–13) | **Roger McDowell** (11) | 24,377 | 38–60–1 |
| 100 | July 28 (1) | Pirates | 5–10 | Neal Heaton (2–7) | **Ken Howell** (8–7) | None | see 2nd game | 38–61–1 |
| 101 | July 28 (2) | Pirates | 6–1 | **Greg A. Harris** (2–2) | Rick Reed (0–1) | None | 35,569 | 39–61–1 |
| 102 | July 29 | Pirates | 6–2 | **Jeff Parrett** (8–3) | Bob Walk (8–7) | **Roger McDowell** (12) | 47,277 | 40–61–1 |
| 103 | July 30 | Pirates | 8–6 | **Dennis Cook** (5–3) | Bob Kipper (3–4) | **Roger McDowell** (13) | 31,341 | 41–61–1 |
| 104 | July 31 (1) | Cubs | 2–10 | Rick Sutcliffe (11–9) | **Terry Mulholland** (1–5) | None | see 2nd game | 41–62–1 |
| 105 | July 31 (2) | Cubs | 7–4 | **Don Carman** (3–11) | Paul Kilgus (6–10) | **Jeff Parrett** (4) | 22,160 | 42–62–1 |

August (12–17)

| # | Date | Opponent | Score | Win | Loss | Save | Attendance | Record |
|---|---|---|---|---|---|---|---|---|
| 106 | August 1 | Cubs | 1–4 | Steve Wilson (4–0) | **Larry McWilliams** (2–11) | Mitch Williams (27) | 23,614 | 42–63–1 |
| 107 | August 2 | Cubs | 6–0 | **Ken Howell** (9–7) | Scott Sanderson (9–7) | None | 21,688 | 43–63–1 |
| 108 | August 3 | Cubs | 0–2 | Greg Maddux (12–8) | **Bruce Ruffin** (3–5) | Les Lancaster (3) | 21,983 | 43–64–1 |
| 109 | August 4 | @ Cardinals | 3–6 | Joe Magrane (13–7) | **Dennis Cook** (5–4) | Todd Worrell (16) | 44,149 | 43–65–1 |
| 110 | August 5 | @ Cardinals | 7–3 | **Terry Mulholland** (2–5) | José DeLeón (11–10) | **Jeff Parrett** (5) | 46,504 | 44–65–1 |
| 111 | August 6 | @ Cardinals | 4–5 (10) | Todd Worrell (2–3) | **Jeff Parrett** (8–4) | None | 38,736 | 44–66–1 |
| 112 | August 7 | Mets | 2–1 | **Roger McDowell** (3–5) | Jeff Musselman (1–3) | None | 35,350 | 45–66–1 |
| 113 | August 8 | Mets | 0–9 | David Cone (9–5) | **Bruce Ruffin** (3–6) | None | 35,196 | 45–67–1 |
| 114 | August 9 | Mets | 0–6 | Bob Ojeda (8–9) | **Dennis Cook** (5–5) | None | 43,462 | 45–68–1 |
| 115 | August 10 | @ Cubs | 16–13 | **Jeff Parrett** (9–4) | Steve Wilson (5–1) | None | 36,745 | 46–68–1 |
| 116 | August 11 | @ Cubs | 2–9 | Greg Maddux (14–8) | **Don Carman** (3–12) | None | 36,440 | 46–69–1 |
| 117 | August 12 | @ Cubs | 7–9 | Mike Bielecki (13–5) | **Ken Howell** (9–8) | Mitch Williams (30) | 37,752 | 46–70–1 |
| 118 | August 13 | @ Cubs | 5–4 | **Jeff Parrett** (10–4) | Steve Wilson (5–2) | None | 37,054 | 47–70–1 |
| 119 | August 15 | Dodgers | 7–6 | **Jeff Parrett** (11–4) | Ray Searage (3–3) | None | 25,169 | 48–70–1 |
| 120 | August 16 | Dodgers | 6–2 | **Don Carman** (4–12) | Tim Belcher (8–12) | **Roger McDowell** (14) | 25,703 | 49–70–1 |
| 121 | August 17 | Dodgers | 4–10 | Fernando Valenzuela (8–11) | **Ken Howell** (9–9) | Alejandro Peña (4) | 25,779 | 49–71–1 |
| 122 | August 18 | Giants | 2–5 | Rick Reuschel (14–5) | **Bruce Ruffin** (3–7) | Steve Bedrosian (17) | 23,368 | 49–72–1 |
| 123 | August 19 | Giants | 1–0 | **Terry Mulholland** (3–5) | Kelly Downs (2–4) | None | 30,366 | 50–72–1 |
| 124 | August 20 | Giants | 2–5 | Jeff Brantley (7–1) | **Roger McDowell** (3–6) | None | 36,530 | 50–73–1 |
| 125 | August 21 | Padres | 2–8 | Dennis Rasmussen (6–9) | **Don Carman** (4–13) | None | 17,467 | 50–74–1 |
| 126 | August 22 | Padres | 4–2 | **Ken Howell** (10–9) | Mark Grant (5–2) | **Roger McDowell** (15) | 21,419 | 51–74–1 |
| 127 | August 23 | Padres | 3–7 | Andy Benes (1–2) | **Bruce Ruffin** (3–8) | None | 20,455 | 51–75–1 |
| 128 | August 25 | @ Dodgers | 3–2 | **Terry Mulholland** (4–5) | Ramón Martínez (3–2) | **Jeff Parrett** (6) | 33,541 | 52–75–1 |
| 129 | August 26 | @ Dodgers | 0–4 | Tim Belcher (10–12) | **Dennis Cook** (5–6) | None | 42,000 | 52–76–1 |
| 130 | August 27 | @ Dodgers | 1–8 | Fernando Valenzuela (9–12) | **Don Carman** (4–14) | None | 28,496 | 52–77–1 |
| 131 | August 28 | @ Giants | 9–1 | **Ken Howell** (11–9) | Rick Reuschel (15–6) | None | 15,614 | 53–77–1 |
| 132 | August 29 | @ Giants | 6–1 | **Bruce Ruffin** (4–8) | Don Robinson (11–9) | **Roger McDowell** (16) | 13,952 | 54–77–1 |
| 133 | August 30 | @ Giants | 2–3 | Kelly Downs (3–5) | **Terry Mulholland** (4–6) | Steve Bedrosian (18) | 19,053 | 54–78–1 |
| 134 | August 31 | @ Padres | 1–5 | Dennis Rasmussen (8–9) | **Don Carman** (4–15) | Mark Grant (2) | 15,541 | 54–79–1 |

September (12–16)

| # | Date | Opponent | Score | Win | Loss | Save | Attendance | Record |
|---|---|---|---|---|---|---|---|---|
| 135 | September 2 | @ Padres | 2–3 | Bruce Hurst (13–9) | **Ken Howell** (11–10) | Mark Davis (33) | 23,161 | 54–80–1 |
| 136 | September 3 | @ Padres | 5–9 | Andy Benes (3–2) | **Dennis Cook** (5–7) | Mark Davis (34) | 24,956 | 54–81–1 |
| 137 | September 4 | Pirates | 5–7 | Bob Patterson (1–1) | **Mike Maddux** (1–3) | Bill Landrum (22) | 13,317 | 54–82–1 |
| 138 | September 5 | Pirates | 3–2 | **Jeff Parrett** (12–4) | Bob Patterson (1–2) | None | 12,484 | 55–82–1 |
| 139 | September 6 | Cubs | 9–1 | **Bruce Ruffin** (5–8) | Greg Maddux (16–11) | None | 17,272 | 56–82–1 |
| 140 | September 7 | Cubs | 2–6 | Mike Bielecki (15–6) | **Ken Howell** (11–11) | None | 13,058 | 56–83–1 |
| 141 | September 8 | @ Expos | 4–3 | **Jason Grimsley** (1–0) | Kevin Gross (11–10) | **Roger McDowell** (17) | 18,151 | 57–83–1 |
| 142 | September 9 | @ Expos | 5–6 | Tim Burke (8–3) | **Jeff Parrett** (12–5) | None | 22,981 | 57–84–1 |
| 143 | September 10 | @ Expos | 4–2 | **Pat Combs** (1–0) | Pascual Pérez (8–13) | **Roger McDowell** (18) | 22,630 | 58–84–1 |
| 144 | September 11 | Mets | 2–5 | Ron Darling (13–12) | **Bruce Ruffin** (5–9) | Randy Myers (23) | 18,690 | 58–85–1 |
| 145 | September 12 | Mets | 2–1 | **Roger McDowell** (4–6) | Don Aase (1–5) | None | 22,953 | 59–85–1 |
| 146 | September 13 | Mets | 4–10 | Bob Ojeda (12–10) | **Jason Grimsley** (1–1) | None | 20,062 | 59–86–1 |
| 147 | September 15 (1) | Cardinals | 2–0 | **Pat Combs** (2–0) | Ken Hill (7–13) | None | see 2nd game | 60–86–1 |
| 148 | September 15 (2) | Cardinals | 6–7 | John Costello (4–3) | **Roger McDowell** (4–7) | None | 22,579 | 60–87–1 |
| – | September 16 | Cardinals | Postponed (rain); Makeup: September 17 as a traditional double-header | | | | | |
| 149 | September 17 (1) | Cardinals | 9–5 (12) | **Dennis Cook** (6–7) | Matt Kinzer (0–2) | None | see 2nd game | 61–87–1 |
| 150 | September 17 (2) | Cardinals | 0–2 | Cris Carpenter (4–4) | **Ken Howell** (11–12) | John Costello (2) | 23,043 | 61–88–1 |
| 151 | September 18 | @ Pirates | 2–6 | Bob Patterson (3–2) | **Jason Grimsley** (1–2) | Randy Kramer (2) | 7,665 | 61–89–1 |
| 152 | September 19 | @ Pirates | 2–4 | Jeff Robinson (7–11) | **Bruce Ruffin** (5–10) | Bill Landrum (24) | 8,156 | 61–90–1 |
| 153 | September 20 | @ Cubs | 9–8 | **Don Carman** (5–15) | Les Lancaster (3–2) | **Roger McDowell** (19) | 21,620 | 62–90–1 |
| 154 | September 21 | @ Cubs | 1–9 | Greg Maddux (18–12) | **Terry Mulholland** (4–7) | None | 22,885 | 62–91–1 |
| 155 | September 22 | @ Cardinals | 1–2 (10) | John Costello (5–3) | **Roger McDowell** (4–8) | None | 45,685 | 62–92–1 |
| 156 | September 23 | @ Cardinals | 5–11 | Frank DiPino (9–0) | **Dennis Cook** (6–8) | None | 38,936 | 62–93–1 |
| 157 | September 24 | @ Cardinals | 1–2 | Ted Power (7–7) | **Jeff Parrett** (12–6) | John Costello (3) | 38,795 | 62–94–1 |
| 158 | September 25 | @ Mets | 2–1 | **Pat Combs** (3–0) | Bob Ojeda (13–11) | **Roger McDowell** (20) | 18,001 | 63–94–1 |
| 159 | September 26 | @ Mets | 0–3 | Sid Fernandez (13–5) | **Jason Grimsley** (1–3) | None | 17,385 | 63–95–1 |
| 160 | September 27 | @ Mets | 5–3 | **Ken Howell** (12–12) | Ron Darling (14–14) | **Roger McDowell** (21) | 18,666 | 64–95–1 |
| 161 | September 29 | Expos | 2–0 | **Dennis Cook** (7–8) | Mark Langston (16–14) | None | 15,771 | 65–95–1 |
| 162 | September 30 | Expos | 6–3 | **Bruce Ruffin** (6–10) | Mark Gardner (0–3) | **Roger McDowell** (22) | 20,448 | 66–95–1 |

October (1–0)

| # | Date | Opponent | Score | Win | Loss | Save | Attendance | Record |
|---|---|---|---|---|---|---|---|---|
| 163 | October 1 | Expos | 5–3 | **Pat Combs** (4–0) | Bryn Smith (10–11) | **Roger McDowell** (23) | 25,213 | 67–95–1 |

- Phillies win
- Phillies loss
- Phillies tie
- Postponement
- Bold: Phillies team member

=== Roster ===
1989 Philadelphia Phillies
**Roster**
| **Pitchers**: 40 Steve Bedrosian; 42 Don Carman; 38 Pat Combs; 39 Dennis Cook; 50 Gordon Dillard; 48 Marvin Freeman; 52 Todd Frohwirth; 54 Jason Grimsley; 33 Greg A. Harris; 43 Ken Howell; 44 Mike Maddux; 34 Alex Madrid; 13 Roger McDowell; 51 Chuck McElroy; 46 Larry McWilliams; 45 Terry Mulholland; 27 Randy O'Neal; 41 Steve Ontiveros; 49 Jeff Parrett; 47 Bruce Ruffin; 37 Bob Sebra; 15 Floyd Youmans | **Catchers**: 10 Darren Daulton; 25 Steve Lake; 19 Tom Nieto; 31 Al Pardo; **Infielders**: 18 Jim Adduci; 29 Tom Barrett; 8 Charlie Hayes; 28 Tom Herr; 30 Steve Jeltz; 17 Ricky Jordan; 31 Mark Ryal; 20 Mike Schmidt; 21 Dickie Thon | **Outfielders**: 23 Eric Bullock; 22 Bob Dernier; 4 Lenny Dykstra; 24 Curt Ford; 9 Von Hayes; 18 Chris James; 26 Ron Jones; 11 John Kruk; 37 Keith Miller; 6 Dwayne Murphy; 23 Randy Ready; 8 Juan Samuel; **Other batters**: 33 Steve Stanicek | **Manager**: 16 Nick Leyva; **Coaches**: 2 Larry Bowa (Third Base); 3 Darold Knowles (Pitching); 4 Denis Menke (Hitting); 5 Mike Ryan (Bullpen); 12 Tony Taylor (First Base); 7 John Vukovich (Bench) |

== Player stats ==
=== Batting ===
==== Starters by position ====
Note: Pos = Position; G = Games played; AB = At bats; H = Hits; Avg. = Batting average; HR = Home runs; RBI = Runs batted in

| Pos | Player | G | AB | H | Avg. | HR | RBI |
|---|---|---|---|---|---|---|---|
| C | Darren Daulton | 131 | 368 | 74 | .201 | 8 | 44 |
| 1B | Ricky Jordan | 144 | 523 | 149 | .285 | 12 | 75 |
| 2B | Tom Herr | 151 | 561 | 161 | .287 | 2 | 37 |
| 3B | Charlie Hayes | 84 | 299 | 77 | .258 | 8 | 43 |
| SS | Dickie Thon | 136 | 435 | 118 | .271 | 15 | 60 |
| LF | John Kruk | 81 | 281 | 93 | .331 | 5 | 38 |
| CF | Lenny Dykstra | 90 | 352 | 78 | .222 | 4 | 19 |
| RF | Von Hayes | 154 | 540 | 140 | .259 | 26 | 78 |

==== Other batters ====
Note: G = Games played; AB = At bats; H = Hits; Avg. = Batting average; HR = Home runs; RBI = Runs batted in

| Player | G | AB | H | Avg. | HR | RBI |
|---|---|---|---|---|---|---|
| Steve Jeltz | 116 | 263 | 64 | .243 | 4 | 25 |
| Juan Samuel | 51 | 199 | 49 | .246 | 8 | 20 |
| Randy Ready | 72 | 187 | 50 | .267 | 8 | 21 |
| Bob Dernier | 107 | 187 | 32 | .171 | 1 | 13 |
| Chris James | 45 | 179 | 37 | .207 | 2 | 19 |
| Dwayne Murphy | 98 | 156 | 34 | .218 | 9 | 27 |
| Steve Lake | 58 | 155 | 39 | .252 | 2 | 14 |
| Mike Schmidt | 42 | 148 | 30 | .203 | 6 | 28 |
| Curt Ford | 108 | 142 | 31 | .218 | 1 | 13 |
| Mark Ryal | 29 | 33 | 8 | .242 | 0 | 5 |
| Ron Jones | 12 | 31 | 9 | .290 | 2 | 4 |
| Tom Barrett | 14 | 27 | 6 | .222 | 0 | 1 |
| Tom Nieto | 11 | 20 | 3 | .150 | 0 | 0 |
| Jim Adduci | 13 | 19 | 7 | .368 | 0 | 0 |
| Keith Miller | 8 | 10 | 3 | .300 | 0 | 0 |
| Steve Stanicek | 9 | 9 | 1 | .111 | 0 | 1 |
| Eric Bullock | 6 | 4 | 0 | .000 | 0 | 0 |
| Al Pardo | 1 | 1 | 0 | .000 | 0 | 0 |

=== Pitching ===
==== Starting pitchers ====
Note: G = Games pitched; IP = Innings pitched; W = Wins; L = Losses; ERA = Earned run average; SO = Strikeouts

| Player | G | IP | W | L | ERA | SO |
|---|---|---|---|---|---|---|
| Ken Howell | 33 | 204.0 | 12 | 12 | 3.44 | 164 |
| Bruce Ruffin | 24 | 125.2 | 6 | 10 | 4.44 | 70 |
| Dennis Cook | 21 | 106.0 | 6 | 8 | 3.99 | 58 |
| Terry Mulholland | 20 | 104.1 | 4 | 7 | 5.00 | 60 |
| Pat Combs | 6 | 38.2 | 4 | 0 | 2.09 | 30 |
| Bob Sebra | 6 | 34.1 | 2 | 3 | 4.46 | 21 |
| Steve Ontiveros | 6 | 30.2 | 2 | 1 | 3.82 | 12 |

==== Other pitchers ====
Note: G = Games pitched; IP = Innings pitched; W = Wins; L = Losses; ERA = Earned run average; SO = Strikeouts

| Player | G | IP | W | L | ERA | SO |
|---|---|---|---|---|---|---|
| Don Carman | 49 | 149.1 | 5 | 15 | 5.24 | 81 |
| Larry McWilliams | 40 | 120.2 | 2 | 11 | 4.10 | 54 |
| Mike Maddux | 16 | 43.2 | 1 | 3 | 5.18 | 26 |
| Floyd Youmans | 10 | 42.2 | 1 | 5 | 5.70 | 20 |
| Alex Madrid | 6 | 24.2 | 1 | 2 | 5.47 | 13 |
| Jason Grimsley | 4 | 18.1 | 1 | 3 | 5.89 | 7 |
| Marvin Freeman | 1 | 3.0 | 0 | 0 | 6.00 | 0 |

==== Relief pitchers ====
Note: G = Games pitched; W = Wins; L = Losses; SV = Saves; ERA = Earned run average; SO = Strikeouts

| Player | G | W | L | SV | ERA | SO |
|---|---|---|---|---|---|---|
| Roger McDowell | 44 | 3 | 3 | 19 | 1.11 | 32 |
| Jeff Parrett | 72 | 12 | 6 | 6 | 2.98 | 98 |
| Todd Frohwirth | 45 | 1 | 0 | 0 | 3.59 | 39 |
| Greg A. Harris | 44 | 2 | 2 | 1 | 3.58 | 51 |
| Steve Bedrosian | 28 | 2 | 3 | 6 | 3.21 | 24 |
| Randy O'Neal | 20 | 0 | 1 | 0 | 6.23 | 29 |
| Chuck McElroy | 11 | 0 | 0 | 0 | 1.74 | 8 |
| Gordon Dillard | 5 | 0 | 0 | 0 | 6.75 | 2 |

== Farm system ==
| Level | Team | League | Manager |
|---|---|---|---|
| AAA | Scranton/Wilkes-Barre; Red Barons | International League | Bill Dancy |
| AA | Reading Phillies | Eastern League | Mike Hart |
| A | Clearwater Phillies | Florida State League | Glenn Gulliver |
| A | Spartanburg Phillies | South Atlantic League | Mel Roberts |
| A-Short Season | Batavia Clippers | New York–Penn League | Don McCormack |
| Rookie | Martinsville Phillies | Appalachian League | Roly de Armas |
