= 1989 St. Louis Cardinals season =

Major League Baseball season

1989 St. Louis Cardinals
- League: National League
- Division: East
- Ballpark: Busch Memorial Stadium
- City: St. Louis, Missouri
- Record: 86–76 (.531)
- Divisional place: 3rd
- Owners: August "Gussie" Busch; Anheuser-Busch
- General managers: Dal Maxvill
- Managers: Whitey Herzog
- Television: KPLR-TV; Cardinal Cable Network (Al Hrabosky, Ken Wilson)
- Radio: KMOX (Jack Buck, Mike Shannon)

The 1989 St. Louis Cardinals season was the team's 108th season in St. Louis, Missouri and the 98th season in the National League. The Cardinals went 86–76 during the season and finished third in the National League East division.

Shortstop Ozzie Smith and third baseman Terry Pendleton won Gold Gloves this year.

On September 29, team owner August A. Busch, Jr. died at the age of 90.

== Offseason ==
- October 4, 1988: Lee Tunnell was released by the Cardinals.
- December 16, 1988: Steve Lake and Curt Ford were traded by the Cardinals to the Philadelphia Phillies for Milt Thompson.

== Regular season ==
The over-achieving 1989 Cardinal team almost made the playoffs. Pedro Guerrero finished third in the National League MVP voting while leading the league with 42 doubles and finishing second in RBIs (117). Joe Magrane won 18 games while José DeLeón won 16 games. Milt Thompson played in 155 games and hit .290, mostly substituting for the injured Willie McGee. Vince Coleman lead the league in stolen bases for the fifth straight year. However, it would be the arch-rival Cubs who would claim the division and move on to the playoffs. This team featured three former college football punters -- Vince Coleman, Cris Carpenter, and Matt Kinzer who played one game for the Detroit Lions.

=== Opening Day starters ===
- Tom Brunansky
- Vince Coleman
- Pedro Guerrero
- Tim Jones
- Joe Magrane
- José Oquendo
- Tony Peña
- Terry Pendleton
- Milt Thompson

=== Season standings ===
NL East
| Team | W | L | Pct. | GB | Home | Road |
|---|---|---|---|---|---|---|
| Chicago Cubs | 93 | 69 | .574 | — | 48‍–‍33 | 45‍–‍36 |
| New York Mets | 87 | 75 | .537 | 6 | 51‍–‍30 | 36‍–‍45 |
| St. Louis Cardinals | 86 | 76 | .531 | 7 | 46‍–‍35 | 40‍–‍41 |
| Montreal Expos | 81 | 81 | .500 | 12 | 44‍–‍37 | 37‍–‍44 |
| Pittsburgh Pirates | 74 | 88 | .457 | 19 | 39‍–‍42 | 35‍–‍46 |
| Philadelphia Phillies | 67 | 95 | .414 | 26 | 38‍–‍42 | 29‍–‍53 |

=== Record vs. opponents ===
1989 National League record Sources:
| Team | ATL | CHC | CIN | HOU | LAD | MON | NYM | PHI | PIT | SD | SF | STL |
|---|---|---|---|---|---|---|---|---|---|---|---|---|
| Atlanta | — | 5–7 | 8–10 | 8–10 | 6–10 | 6–6 | 2–10 | 8–4 | 4–8 | 7–11 | 6–12 | 3–9 |
| Chicago | 7–5 | — | 7–5 | 5–7 | 7–5 | 10–8 | 10–8 | 10–8 | 12–6 | 8–4 | 6–6 | 11–7 |
| Cincinnati | 10–8 | 5–7 | — | 8–10 | 8–10 | 4–8 | 4–8 | 4–8 | 7–5 | 9–9 | 8–10 | 8–4 |
| Houston | 10–8 | 7–5 | 10–8 | — | 10–8 | 4–8 | 6–6 | 9–3 | 7–5 | 8–10 | 8–10 | 7–5 |
| Los Angeles | 10–6 | 5–7 | 10–8 | 8–10 | — | 7–5 | 5–7 | 6–6 | 7–5 | 6–12 | 10–8 | 3–9 |
| Montreal | 6–6 | 8–10 | 8–4 | 8–4 | 5–7 | — | 9–9 | 9–9 | 11–7 | 5–7 | 7–5 | 5–13 |
| New York | 10–2 | 8–10 | 8–4 | 6–6 | 7–5 | 9–9 | — | 12–6 | 9–9 | 5–7 | 3–9 | 10–8 |
| Philadelphia | 4–8 | 8–10 | 8–4 | 3–9 | 6–6 | 9–9 | 6–12 | — | 10–8 | 2–10 | 4–8 | 7–11 |
| Pittsburgh | 8–4 | 6–12 | 5–7 | 5–7 | 5–7 | 7–11 | 9–9 | 8–10 | — | 3–9 | 5–7 | 13–5 |
| San Diego | 11–7 | 4–8 | 9–9 | 10–8 | 12–6 | 7–5 | 7–5 | 10–2 | 9–3 | — | 8–10 | 2–10 |
| San Francisco | 12–6 | 6–6 | 10–8 | 10–8 | 8–10 | 5–7 | 9–3 | 8–4 | 7–5 | 10–8 | — | 7–5 |
| St. Louis | 9–3 | 7–11 | 4–8 | 5–7 | 9–3 | 13–5 | 8–10 | 11–7 | 5–13 | 10–2 | 5–7 | — |

=== Notable transactions ===
- April 24, 1989: Jeremy Hernandez was traded by the Cardinals to the San Diego Padres for Randy Byers.

=== Roster ===
1989 St. Louis Cardinals
Roster
| Pitchers: 44 Cris Carpenter; 50 John Costello; 46 Ken Dayley; 48 José DeLeón; 35 Frank DiPino; 30 Don Heinkel; 43 Ken Hill; 49 Ricky Horton; 59 Matt Kinzer; 32 Joe Magrane; 42 Ted Power; 40 Dan Quisenberry; 37 Scott Terry; 39 Bob Tewksbury; 38 Todd Worrell | Catchers: 19 Tom Pagnozzi; 26 Tony Peña; 27 Todd Zeile; Infielders: 10 Rod Booker; 16 Leon Durham; 28 Pedro Guerrero; 22 Tim Jones; 15 Jim Lindeman; 11 Jose Oquendo; 9 Terry Pendleton; 1 Ozzie Smith; 21 Denny Walling; 12 Craig Wilson | Outfielders: 23 Tom Brunansky; 29 Vince Coleman; 51 Willie McGee; 33 John Morris; 25 Milt Thompson | Manager: 24 Whitey Herzog; Coaches: 7 Rich Hacker (Third base); 8 Johnny Lewis (Hitting); 3 Dave Ricketts (Bullpen); 5 Jim Riggleman (First base); 4 Mike Roarke (Pitching); 2 Red Schoendienst (Bench) |

== Player stats ==
=== Batting ===
==== Starters by position ====
Note: Pos = Position; G = Games played; AB = At bats; H = Hits; Avg. = Batting average; HR = Home runs; RBI = Runs batted in

| Pos | Player | G | AB | H | Avg. | HR | RBI |
|---|---|---|---|---|---|---|---|
| C | Tony Peña | 141 | 424 | 110 | .259 | 4 | 37 |
| 1B | Pedro Guerrero | 162 | 570 | 177 | .311 | 17 | 117 |
| 2B | José Oquendo | 163 | 556 | 162 | .291 | 1 | 48 |
| 3B | Terry Pendleton | 162 | 613 | 162 | .264 | 13 | 74 |
| SS | Ozzie Smith | 155 | 593 | 162 | .273 | 2 | 50 |
| LF | Vince Coleman | 145 | 563 | 143 | .254 | 2 | 28 |
| CF | Milt Thompson | 155 | 545 | 158 | .290 | 4 | 68 |
| RF | Tom Brunansky | 158 | 556 | 133 | .239 | 20 | 85 |

==== Other batters ====
Note: G = Games played; AB = At bats; H = Hits; Avg. = Batting average; HR = Home runs; RBI = Runs batted in

| Player | G | AB | H | Avg. | HR | RBI |
|---|---|---|---|---|---|---|
| Willie McGee | 58 | 199 | 47 | .236 | 3 | 17 |
| John Morris | 96 | 117 | 28 | .239 | 2 | 14 |
| Todd Zeile | 28 | 82 | 21 | .256 | 1 | 8 |
| Tom Pagnozzi | 52 | 80 | 12 | .150 | 0 | 3 |
| Denny Walling | 69 | 79 | 24 | .304 | 1 | 11 |
| Tim Jones | 42 | 75 | 22 | .293 | 0 | 7 |
| Jim Lindeman | 73 | 45 | 5 | .111 | 0 | 2 |
| Leon Durham | 29 | 18 | 1 | .056 | 0 | 1 |
| Rod Booker | 10 | 8 | 2 | .250 | 0 | 0 |
| Craig Wilson | 6 | 4 | 1 | .250 | 0 | 1 |

=== Pitching ===
==== Starting pitchers ====
Note: G = Games pitched; IP = Innings pitched; W = Wins; L = Losses; ERA = Earned run average; SO = Strikeouts

| Player | G | IP | W | L | ERA | SO |
|---|---|---|---|---|---|---|
| José DeLeón | 36 | 244.2 | 16 | 12 | 3.05 | 201 |
| Joe Magrane | 34 | 234.2 | 18 | 9 | 2.91 | 127 |
| Ken Hill | 33 | 196.2 | 7 | 15 | 3.80 | 112 |
| Scott Terry | 31 | 148.2 | 8 | 10 | 3.57 | 69 |

==== Other pitchers ====
Note: G = Games pitched; IP = Innings pitched; W = Wins; L = Losses; ERA = Earned run average; SO = Strikeouts

| Player | G | IP | W | L | ERA | SO |
|---|---|---|---|---|---|---|
| Ted Power | 23 | 97.0 | 7 | 7 | 3.71 | 43 |
| Ricky Horton | 11 | 45.2 | 0 | 3 | 4.73 | 14 |
| Bob Tewksbury | 7 | 30.0 | 1 | 0 | 3.30 | 17 |
| Don Heinkel | 7 | 26.1 | 1 | 1 | 5.81 | 16 |

==== Relief pitchers ====
Note: G = Games pitched; W = Wins; L = Losses; SV = Saves; ERA = Earned run average; SO = Strikeouts

| Player | G | W | L | SV | ERA | SO |
|---|---|---|---|---|---|---|
| Todd Worrell | 47 | 3 | 5 | 20 | 2.96 | 41 |
| Ken Dayley | 71 | 4 | 3 | 12 | 2.87 | 40 |
| Frank DiPino | 67 | 9 | 0 | 0 | 2.45 | 44 |
| Dan Quisenberry | 63 | 3 | 1 | 6 | 2.64 | 37 |
| John Costello | 48 | 5 | 4 | 3 | 3.32 | 40 |
| Cris Carpenter | 36 | 4 | 4 | 0 | 3.18 | 35 |
| Matt Kinzer | 8 | 0 | 2 | 0 | 12.83 | 8 |

== Awards and honors ==
- Vince Coleman, National League Stolen Base Leader, 65
- Terry Pendleton, Third Base, National League Gold Glove
- Ozzie Smith, Shortstop, National League Gold Glove

== Farm system ==
| Level | Team | League | Manager |
|---|---|---|---|
| AAA | Louisville Redbirds | American Association | Mike Jorgensen |
| AA | Arkansas Travelers | Texas League | Gaylen Pitts |
| A | St. Petersburg Cardinals | Florida State League | Dave Bialas |
| A | Springfield Cardinals | Midwest League | Dan Radison |
| A | Savannah Cardinals | South Atlantic League | Keith Champion |
| A-Short Season | Hamilton Redbirds | New York–Penn League | Joe Pettini |
| Rookie | Johnson City Cardinals | Appalachian League | Mark DeJohn |
| Rookie | AZL Cardinals | Arizona League | Luis Meléndez |

LEAGUE CHAMPIONS: Arkansas
