= Jim Adduci =

Jim Adduci may refer to:

- Jim Adduci (baseball, born 1959), American former left-handed outfielder and first baseman
- Jim Adduci (baseball, born 1985), Canadian baseball outfielder

== See also ==
- Adduci
