= Gregg Jefferies =

American baseball player (born 1967)

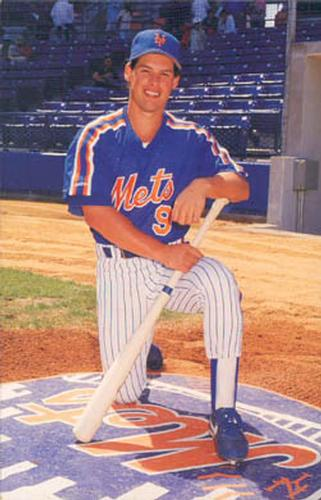
- Infielder / Left fielder
- Born: August 1, 1967 (age 59); Burlingame, California, U.S.
- Batted: Switch Threw: Right

MLB debut
- September 6, 1987, for the New York Mets

Last MLB appearance
- May 29, 2000, for the Detroit Tigers

MLB statistics
- Batting average: .289
- Home runs: 126
- Runs batted in: 663
- Stats at Baseball Reference

Teams
- New York Mets (1987–1991); Kansas City Royals (1992); St. Louis Cardinals (1993–1994); Philadelphia Phillies (1995–1998); Anaheim Angels (1998); Detroit Tigers (1999–2000)

Career highlights and awards
- 2× All-Star (1993, 1994)

Gregory Scott Jefferies (born August 1, 1967) is an American former infielder and outfielder in Major League Baseball who had a 14-year career from 1987 to 2000. He played for six MLB teams, primarily the New York Mets and Philadelphia Phillies. He was a highly touted prospect who became the first two-time winner of the Baseball America Minor League Player of the Year Award. In 2017, Baseball America called him their most highly regarded prospect until Andruw Jones. He went on to become a two-time All-Star.

== Early life ==
Jefferies was born in Burlingame, California. His father, the baseball coach at Parkside Junior High School in San Bruno, California, developed Jefferies as a baseball player by pushing him through an intense workout eight hours per day, six days per week, which involved, among other things, swinging a baseball bat underwater. Jefferies attended Junípero Serra High School in San Mateo, California, where he played baseball and football. While he was in high school, his brother played baseball at the University of San Francisco. Jefferies initially committed to play both college baseball and football at Cal State Fullerton after high school.

== Professional career ==
=== Draft and minor leagues ===
The New York Mets drafted Jefferies out of high school in the first round, with the 20th selection of the 1985 MLB draft. Jefferies hit .331 in his first year in the minor leagues, moving from Kingsport of the Appalachian League (rookie) to Jackson of the Texas League (AA) in two years. He was named Baseball America's Minor League Player of the Year for both 1986 and 1987, becoming the first player to receive that distinction in consecutive years.

=== New York Mets (1987–1991) ===
Jefferies hit .367 with 20 home runs, 48 doubles and 101 RBI for Jackson in 1987, earning Jefferies a brief call-up from the Mets at the end of the 1987 season. He went 3-for-6 in 6 games, at the age of 20, making him the youngest player in the major leagues that season.

The Mets decided they needed to make room for Jefferies, but didn't know where to play him, as the veteran team was full at the spots Jefferies played in the minor leagues (shortstop, third base and second base). The outfield was full as well, with the team finding it difficult to get outfielders Lenny Dykstra and Mookie Wilson playing time alongside Darryl Strawberry and Kevin McReynolds, so Jefferies was sent to Triple-A Tidewater to start the 1988 season.

After spending most of the 1988 season at Triple-A, hitting .282, Jefferies was recalled at the end of August and allowed to play out the year as a starter, mostly at third base. He responded by hitting .321 over the last 29 games of the 1988 season. The team had an MLB-best 24–7 record after his debut and finished with a league-best 100 wins en route to the National League East title. In his only postseason games, Jefferies batted .333 with two doubles as the Mets lost the National League Championship Series.

The Mets made a full-time roster spot for Jefferies when they traded Wally Backman to the Minnesota Twins, leaving second base open for Jefferies. But Jefferies faltered, hitting .258 with little selectivity as a rookie in 1989.

During a game against the Philadelphia Phillies on September 27, 1989, Jefferies was the last batter to ground out before the Mets lost the game. Jefferies then heard some unkind comments from his former teammate Roger McDowell and charged the mound, starting a bench-clearing brawl.

In response to criticism from teammates, on May 24, 1991, Jefferies pleaded his case in an open letter read on sports radio station WFAN. In the letter, Jefferies wrote:

"When a pitcher is having trouble getting players out, when a hitter is having trouble hitting, or when a player makes an error, I try to support them in whatever way I can. I don't run to the media to belittle them or to draw more attention to their difficult times. I can only hope that one day those teammates who have found it convenient to criticize me will realize that we are all in this together. If only we can concentrate more on the games than complaining and bickering and pointing fingers, we would all be better off."

In 2020, Jefferies denied having written the letter but did not reveal who wrote it.

In 1990, Jefferies raised his batting average to .283 while scoring 96 runs and leading the NL with 40 doubles, but the Mets finished second in the NL East for the second straight year. He slipped in 1991, hitting .272 with 30 extra base hits in 486 at bats as the team slipped to 5th place.

=== Kansas City Royals (1992) ===
On December 11, 1991, the Mets traded Jefferies, McReynolds and infielder Keith Miller to the Kansas City Royals for former All-Star pitcher Bret Saberhagen and infielder Bill Pecota. Jefferies batted .285 with 75 RBI, then a career-high, in his lone season in Kansas City.

=== St. Louis Cardinals (1993–1994) ===
In February 1993, the Royals traded Jefferies and minor league outfielder Ed Gerald to the St. Louis Cardinals for outfielder Félix José and infielder Craig Wilson. Jefferies had his two best seasons, batting .342 and .325, respectively, while playing first base and being named to the National League All-Star team in both 1993 and 1994.

=== Philadelphia Phillies (1995–1998) ===
Jefferies signed a four-year, $20 million contract (equivalent to $43,400,000 in 2025) with the Philadelphia Phillies after the 1994 season. At the time, the contract was the largest in Phillies history. He chose to leave St. Louis because the Cardinals would not give him a no-trade clause. He moved to the outfield for the Phillies, where he performed adequately over the 1995, 1996 and 1997 seasons, but injuries to his thumb and hamstring hampered his effectiveness. On August 25, 1995, in a game vs. the Los Angeles Dodgers at Veterans Stadium, Jefferies became the first Phillie to hit for the cycle since Johnny Callison in 1963.

=== Anaheim Angels (1998) ===
In 1998, Jefferies was traded mid-season to the Anaheim Angels, where he hit .347 in 19 games before moving to the Detroit Tigers the next year.

=== Detroit Tigers (1999–2000) ===
Jefferies hit a collective .231 for the Tigers over two seasons before he retired in 2000 due in part to a severed right hamstring. Tigers manager Phil Garner offered Jefferies the bench coach job for 2001 but he declined.

For his career, Jefferies had a career .289 batting average with 126 home runs, 663 RBIs and 196 stolen bases. In 2020, he told the St. Louis Post-Dispatch that he was "absolutely not" content with what he accomplished in his career.

== Personal life ==
Jefferies resided in Pleasanton, California, with his wife and kids. He was a hitting instructor at Total Players Center in Pleasanton before opening Gregg Jefferies Sports Academy, also in Pleasanton. He coached Troy Channing, who was selected in the 2008 MLB draft.

In 2017, Jefferies was working as a hitting instructor at Office Sports Academy in Anaheim. By 2020, he had relocated to Las Vegas, where he was working as a freelance hitting instructor.

Jefferies has four children from two marriages. His son Jake was selected by the Washington Nationals in the 39th round of the 2015 MLB draft and played two seasons in their minor league system.

== See also ==
- List of Major League Baseball annual doubles leaders
- List of Major League Baseball players to hit for the cycle

Achievements
Preceded by Rondell White	Hitting for the cycle September 3, 1995	Succeeded by Tony Fernández
