= 1989 Montreal Expos season =

1989 Montreal Expos
- League: National League
- Division: East
- Ballpark: Olympic Stadium
- City: Montreal
- Record: 81–81
- Divisional place: 4th
- Owners: Charles Bronfman
- General managers: Dave Dombrowski
- Managers: Buck Rodgers
- Television: CBC Television (Dave Van Horne, Ken Singleton); The Sports Network (Ken Singleton, Jim Hughson); Télévision de Radio-Canada (Claude Raymond, Raymond Lebrun)
- Radio: CJAD (English) (Dave Van Horne, Bobby Winkles, Jerry Trupiano); CKAC (French) (Jacques Doucet, Rodger Brulotte)

The 1989 Montreal Expos season was the 21st season of the baseball franchise. With owner Charles Bronfman thinking of selling the team he founded, he contemplated taking one last shot at a playoff berth. Bronfman gave young general manager Dave Dombrowski a clear mandate to win now, reportedly telling him he would provided all the money needed in the quest to bring a championship to Montreal in 1989. Dombrowski pulled off a massive trade on May 25, acquiring star left-handed pitcher – and pending free agent – Mark Langston from the Seattle Mariners. While the move was viewed as a coup at the time, it came at a heavy cost as a young, very tall and very raw Randy Johnson was the key part of the package going to the Pacific Northwest. Johnson would eventually harness his fantastic stuff and became one of the game's most dominant left-handed pitchers for well over a decade. Langston pitched 4 months for the club and left as a free agent. Still, it seemed like a worthy gamble at the time for the Expos. That year, there was no dominant team in the National League. The team seemed poised to compete for the NL East crown with a loaded starting pitching staff that featured Langston, Dennis Martínez, Bryn Smith, Pascual Perez and Kevin Gross.

The team peaked on August 2 with an National League best record of 63–44, holding a 3-game lead in the National League East and everything running along smoothly. What followed would go down as the greatest collapse in franchise history. The next night, a Benny Distefano pinch hit single in the 12th inning dealt the Expos a 1–0 loss in Pittsburgh. It was the start of a 7-game losing streak. The club limped through the rest of August but remained in the race in early September, with the team being only 2 games back of first place on September 6. Regardless, the downward spiral continued as the Expos inexplicably ended up losing 37 of their final 55 games to finish the season a disappointing 81–81, well out of the playoff picture. The easiest analysis of what caused the collapse is to point to the offense, which struggled after August 2, scoring an MLB worst 3.23 runs per game. For long-time Expos fans, the collapse is viewed as the beginning of the end of the franchise. If the club had won the NL East title that year and then beaten the Giants in the NLCS, clinching a World Series berth in the process, Bronfman may have changed his mind about selling the team. Instead, the late season collapse only added to the owner's frustration.

== Offseason ==
- December 8, 1988: Tracy Jones was traded by the Expos to the San Francisco Giants for Mike Aldrete.
- December 8, 1988: John Dopson and Luis Rivera were traded by the Expos to the Boston Red Sox for Spike Owen and Dan Gakeler.

== Spring training ==
The Expos held spring training at West Palm Beach Municipal Stadium in West Palm Beach, Florida – a facility they shared with the Atlanta Braves. It was their 13th season at the stadium; they had conducted spring training there from 1969 to 1972 and since 1981.

== Regular season ==
- August 23, 1989: The Expos and Los Angeles Dodgers engage in a 22-inning marathon, the longest game in Expos history. It eventually ended when Rick Dempsey homered for the Dodgers in the top half of the 22nd inning off Dennis Martínez in a very rare relief performance. Rex Hudler was caught stealing second in the bottom half of the 22nd to end the game. The game would have ended earlier when an Expo scored from third on a sacrifice fly. The Dodgers' appeal, that the runner left the base too soon, was recognized by the third base umpire and the third out was recorded. The game also marked the first time that a mascot was ejected by an umpire. Youppi!, dressed in a nightgown and nightcap, pretended to sleep on top of the Dodgers' dugout, and Dodgers manager Tommy Lasorda and umpire Bob Davidson ejected Youppi! from the game. In the end, the game took over 6 hours to finish and ended close to 2:00 am.
- August 15, 1989: San Francisco Giants pitcher Dave Dravecky pitched three no-hit innings, but in the fifth inning, he felt a tingling sensation in his arm. In the sixth inning he started off shaky, allowing a home run to the lead off batter and then hitting the second batter. Then, on his first pitch to Tim Raines, his humerus bone snapped, ending his career.

=== Opening Day starters ===
- Hubie Brooks
- Tom Foley
- Andrés Galarraga
- Dave Martinez
- Dennis Martínez
- Spike Owen
- Tim Raines
- Nelson Santovenia
- Tim Wallach

=== Season standings ===
NL East
Team	W	L	Pct.	GB	Home	Road
Chicago Cubs	93	69	.574	—	48‍–‍33	45‍–‍36
New York Mets	87	75	.537	6	51‍–‍30	36‍–‍45
St. Louis Cardinals	86	76	.531	7	46‍–‍35	40‍–‍41
Montreal Expos	81	81	.500	12	44‍–‍37	37‍–‍44
Pittsburgh Pirates	74	88	.457	19	39‍–‍42	35‍–‍46
Philadelphia Phillies	67	95	.414	26	38‍–‍42	29‍–‍53

=== Record vs. opponents ===
1989 National League record Sources:
Team	ATL	CHC	CIN	HOU	LAD	MON	NYM	PHI	PIT	SD	SF	STL
Atlanta	—	5–7	8–10	8–10	6–10	6–6	2–10	8–4	4–8	7–11	6–12	3–9
Chicago	7–5	—	7–5	5–7	7–5	10–8	10–8	10–8	12–6	8–4	6–6	11–7
Cincinnati	10–8	5–7	—	8–10	8–10	4–8	4–8	4–8	7–5	9–9	8–10	8–4
Houston	10–8	7–5	10–8	—	10–8	4–8	6–6	9–3	7–5	8–10	8–10	7–5
Los Angeles	10–6	5–7	10–8	8–10	—	7–5	5–7	6–6	7–5	6–12	10–8	3–9
Montreal	6–6	8–10	8–4	8–4	5–7	—	9–9	9–9	11–7	5–7	7–5	5–13
New York	10–2	8–10	8–4	6–6	7–5	9–9	—	12–6	9–9	5–7	3–9	10–8
Philadelphia	4–8	8–10	8–4	3–9	6–6	9–9	6–12	—	10–8	2–10	4–8	7–11
Pittsburgh	8–4	6–12	5–7	5–7	5–7	7–11	9–9	8–10	—	3–9	5–7	13–5
San Diego	11–7	4–8	9–9	10–8	12–6	7–5	7–5	10–2	9–3	—	8–10	2–10
San Francisco	12–6	6–6	10–8	10–8	8–10	5–7	9–3	8–4	7–5	10–8	—	7–5
St. Louis	9–3	7–11	4–8	5–7	9–3	13–5	8–10	11–7	5–13	10–2	5–7	—

=== Notable transactions ===
- May 25, 1989: Randy Johnson, Brian Holman, and Gene Harris were traded by the Expos to the Seattle Mariners for Mark Langston and a player to be named later. The Mariners completed the deal by sending Mike Campbell to the Expos on July 31.
- July 2, 1989: Sergio Valdez, Nate Minchey, and Kevin Dean (minors) were traded by the Expos to the Atlanta Braves for Zane Smith.
- July 27, 1989: Rick Carriger (minors) was traded by the Expos to the Cleveland Indians for Doug Piatt.
- August 29, 1989: Mike Blowers was traded by the Expos to the New York Yankees for John Candelaria.

==== Draft picks ====
- June 5, 1989: 1989 Major League Baseball draft
  - Charles Johnson was drafted by the Expos in the 1st round (10th pick), but did not sign.
  - Doug Bochtler was drafted by the Expos in the 9th round. Player signed June 26, 1989.

=== Major League debuts ===
- Batters:
  - Marquis Grissom (Aug 22)
  - Marty Pevey (May 16)
  - Larry Walker (Aug 16)
- Pitchers:
  - Steve Frey (May 10)
  - Mark Gardner (May 16)
  - Gene Harris (Apr 5)

=== Roster ===
1989 Montreal Expos
Roster
Pitchers: 44 Tim Burke; 45 John Candelaria; 41 Steve Frey; 40 Mark Gardner; 26 Brett Gideon; 46 Kevin Gross; 43,61 Gene Harris; 38 Joe Hesketh; 59 Brian Holman; 51 Randy Johnson; 12 Mark Langston; 43 Urbano Lugo; 32 Dennis Martínez; 27 Andy McGaffigan; 34 Pascual Pérez; 28 Bryn Smith; 23 Zane Smith; 48 Rich Thompson	Catchers: 20 Mike Fitzgerald; 49 Marty Pevey; 2 Gilberto Reyes; 22 Nelson Santovenia; Infielders: 16 Tom Foley; 14 Andrés Galarraga; 4 Dámaso García; 25 Rex Hudler; 15 Jeff Huson; 6 Wallace Johnson; 3 Junior Noboa; 11 Spike Owen; 29 Tim Wallach	Outfielders: 24 Mike Aldrete; 7 Hubie Brooks; 9 Marquis Grissom; 1 Dave Martinez; 35 Otis Nixon; 30 Tim Raines; 33 Larry Walker	Other batters: 5 Jim Dwyer	Manager: 37 Buck Rodgers; Coaches: 36 Larry Bearnarth (Pitching); 18 Ron Hansen (Bench); 17 Rafael Landestoy (First Base); 31 Ken Macha (Bullpen); 42 Jackie Moore (Third Base); 19 Joe Sparks (Hitting)

== Player stats ==
= Indicates team leader

=== Batting ===
==== Starters by position ====
Note: Pos = Position; G = Games played; AB = At bats; H = Hits; Avg. = Batting average; HR = Home runs; RBI = Runs batted in; SB = Stolen bases

Pos	Player	G	AB	H	Avg.	HR	RBI	SB
C	Nelson Santovenia	97	304	76	.250	5	31	2
1B	Andrés Galarraga	152	572	147	.257	23	85	12
2B	Tom Foley	122	375	86	.229	7	39	2
3B	Tim Wallach	154	573	159	.277	13	77	3
SS	Spike Owen	142	437	102	.233	6	41	3
LF	Tim Raines	145	517	148	.286	9	60	41
CF	Dave Martinez	126	361	99	.274	3	27	23
RF	Hubie Brooks	148	542	145	.268	14	70	6

==== Other batters ====
Note: G = Games played; AB = At bats; H = Hits; Avg. = Batting average; HR = Home runs; RBI = Runs batted in; SB = Stolen bases

Player	G	AB	H	Avg.	HR	RBI	SB
Mike Fitzgerald	100	290	69	.238	7	42	3
Otis Nixon	126	258	56	.217	0	21	37
Dámaso García	80	203	55	.271	3	18	5
Rex Hudler	92	155	38	.245	6	13	15
Mike Aldrete	76	136	30	.221	1	12	1
Wallace Johnson	85	114	31	.272	2	17	1
Marquis Grissom	26	74	19	.257	1	2	1
Jeff Huson	32	74	12	.162	0	2	3
Larry Walker	20	47	8	.170	0	4	1
Junior Noboa	21	44	10	.227	0	1	0
Marty Pevey	13	41	9	.220	0	3	0
Jim Dwyer	13	10	3	.300	0	2	0
Gilberto Reyes	4	5	1	.200	0	1	0

=== Pitching ===
==== Starting pitchers ====
Note: G = Games played; IP = Innings pitched; W = Wins; L = Losses; ERA = Earned run average; SO = Strikeouts

Player	G	IP	W	L	ERA	SO
Dennis Martínez	34	232.0	16	7	3.18	142
Bryn Smith	33	215.2	10	11	2.84	129
Kevin Gross	31	201.1	11	12	4.38	158
Pascual Pérez	33	198.1	9	13	3.31	152
Mark Langston	24	176.2	12	9	2.39	175

==== Other pitchers ====
Note: G = Games pitched; IP = Innings pitched; W = Wins; L = Losses; ERA = Earned run average; SO = Strikeouts

Player	G	IP	W	L	ERA	SO
Brian Holman	10	31.2	1	2	4.83	23
Randy Johnson	7	29.2	0	4	6.67	26
Mark Gardner	7	26.1	0	3	5.13	21

==== Relief pitchers ====
Note: G = Games pitched; W = Wins; L = Losses; SV = Saves; ERA = Earned run average; SO = Strikeouts

Player	G	W	L	SV	ERA	SO
Tim Burke	68	9	3	28	2.55	54
Andy McGaffigan	57	3	5	2	4.68	40
Joe Hesketh	43	6	4	3	5.77	44
Zane Smith	31	0	1	2	1.50	35
Steve Frey	20	3	2	0	5.48	15
Rich Thompson	19	0	2	0	2.18	15
John Candelaria	12	0	2	0	3.31	14
Gene Harris	11	1	1	0	4.95	11
Brett Gideon	4	0	0	0	1.93	2
Urbano Lugo	3	0	0	0	6.75	3
Tim Wallach	1	0	0	0	9.00	0
Tom Foley	1	0	0	0	27.00	0

== Award winners ==
- Mark Langston, National League Pitcher of the Month, July

1989 Major League Baseball All-Star Game

- Tim Burke, Pitcher, Reserve
- Tim Wallach, Third Base, Reserve

== Farm system ==
Level	Team	League	Manager
AAA	Indianapolis Indians	American Association	Tom Runnells
AA	Jacksonville Expos	Southern League	Alan Bannister
A	West Palm Beach Expos	Florida State League	Felipe Alou
A	Rockford Expos	Midwest League	Mike Quade
A-Short Season	Jamestown Expos	New York–Penn League	Don Werner
Rookie	GCL Expos	Gulf Coast League	Jerry Weinstein

LEAGUE CHAMPIONS: Indianapolis, Jamestown
