= Tom Foley (infielder) =

American baseball player (born 1959)

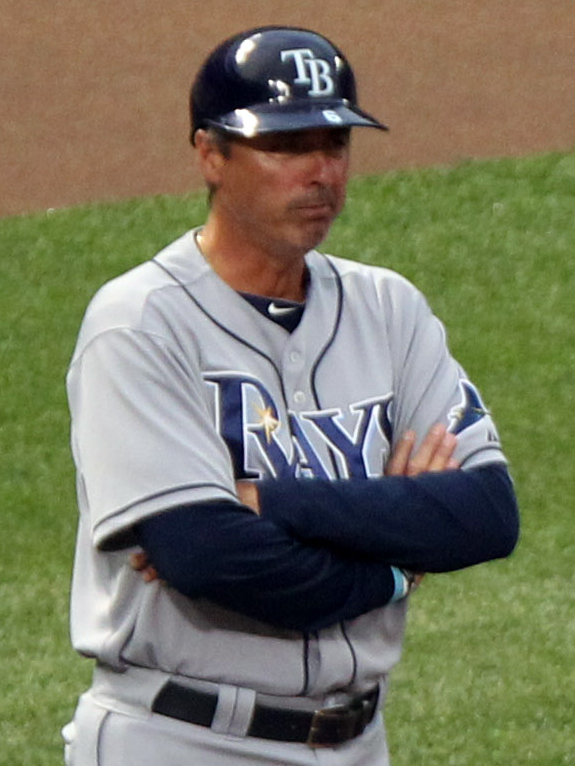
- Foley in 2011
- Shortstop / Second baseman
- Born: September 9, 1959 (age 67); Columbus, Georgia, U.S.
- Batted: Left Threw: Right

MLB debut
- April 9, 1983, for the Cincinnati Reds

Last MLB appearance
- July 13, 1995, for the Montreal Expos

MLB statistics
- Batting average: .244
- Home runs: 32
- Runs batted in: 263
- Stats at Baseball Reference

Teams
- As player: Cincinnati Reds (1983–1985); Philadelphia Phillies (1985–1986); Montreal Expos (1986–1992, 1995); Pittsburgh Pirates (1993–1994); As coach: Tampa Bay Devil Rays / Rays (2002–2017)

Thomas Michael Foley (born September 9, 1959) is an American former professional baseball infielder and coach who played in Major League Baseball (MLB) for the Cincinnati Reds, Philadelphia Phillies, Montreal Expos, and Pittsburgh Pirates, from 1983 to 1994. After retiring as a player, Foley served as an on-field coach for the Tampa Bay Rays, from 2002 through 2017, when he moved into the team's front office.

== Early years ==
Foley was born in Columbus, Georgia. His father was in the U.S. Army so he moved a lot in his childhood. When he was growing up he lived in France, Hawaii, and Japan for four years.

Foley graduated from Miami Palmetto High School, where he played both football, basketball and baseball. After high school, Foley played baseball at Dade South Community College until the Cincinnati Reds drafted him in the 7th round of the 1977 amateur draft.

== Playing career ==
At age 23, Foley made his major league debut on April 9, 1983. In his first start 8 days later, he had a walk and a two-run double in the first inning before even taking the field.

During the 1985 season, he was traded to the Philadelphia Phillies along with Alan Knicely and a player to be named later (Freddie Toliver) for Bo Diaz and Greg Simpson. Projected as the Phillies' starting shortstop in 1986, he was hit by a pitch in spring training and wound up playing sparingly (but well) behind the incumbent, Steve Jeltz. On July 24, 1986, Foley was traded to the Montreal Expos along with Lary Sorensen for Skeeter Barnes and Dan Schatzeder.

As an Expo, Foley played regularly as a utility infielder over the next three seasons, attaining personal bests in games played (127 in 1988), batting average (.293 in 1987), slugging percentage (.432 in 1987), runs scored (35 in 1987), home runs (7 in 1989), and RBI (43 in 1988). While his playing time diminished over his remaining time in Montreal, his utility role expanded as he played all four infield positions during each of the 1990-1992 seasons.

Prior to the 1993 season, Foley signed as a free agent with the Pittsburgh Pirates, where he continued to serve as a part-time player/utility infielder for two seasons. He returned to Montreal for the 1995 season, but played sparingly and retired after being released on July 26, 1995.

All of Foley's 13 seasons were played in the National League, and he was never part of a team that reached the postseason. A natural left-hander, he fielded/threw right-handed because as a youngster he first played baseball with his father's right-hander's glove. Foley credited his versatility afield for his longevity. "I really wasn't a great player, but I was an average major league player who did the little things. I played all of the infield positions and did what I was supposed to do. They say there are glove guys, and I was a glove guy. I could catch the ball and throw the ball, and I tried to mix in as many hits as I could." Fielding metrics back that up—over his career, Foley compiled above league-average range factors at both second and third base, and average range factors at shortstop. When asked what stood out to him about his 13 seasons in the majors, he responded, "Probably just making it to the major leagues."

== Post-playing/coaching career ==
After his retirement as a player, Foley was hired in 1996 by the expansion Tampa Bay Rays as a minor league field coordinator. Following the team's initial June amateur draft, he oversaw the first mini camp in club history. During the summer of 1996, Foley also managed the Rays' Rookie level team in Butte, Montana. He led the Copper Kings to a 37-35 record and was named the Pioneer League's Manager of the Year. After four years as field coordinator, Foley became the Rays' director of minor league operations in 2000. He also managed an Arizona Fall League team, the Maryvale Saguaros, in 2001.

Foley was hired by the Tampa Bay Rays to be their third base coach on October 25, 2001, and served in that role through the 2014 season, working under Hal McRae, Lou Piniella and Joe Maddon. During his 13 years as the third base coach, he waved home 9,418 runs, or 77% of the 12,215 runs scored in club history to that point. On December 19, 2014, the Rays announced that Foley would move into the dugout to serve as new manager Kevin Cash's bench coach. On October 2, 2017, the Rays announced Foley left the bench coach role in a mutual agreement and would be taking another role with the team. He is the longest-tenured coach in Rays history.

== Personal life ==
He married Marta Wright on August 28, 1981, and they have three children together, Bryan, Brett and Brooke. Brett works within the Rays organization with his father. He is an area supervisor scout covering Iowa, Illinois, Minnesota and Wisconsin.

== See also ==
Preceded by Terry Collins	Tampa Bay Devil Rays/ Tampa Bay Rays third base coach 2002–2014	Succeeded by Charlie Montoyo
Preceded by Dave Martinez	Tampa Bay Rays bench coach 2015–2017	Succeeded by Charlie Montoyo
