= Adduci =

Adduci is a surname. Notable people with the surname include:

- Jim Adduci (born 1959), American baseball player
- Jim Adduci (born 1985), American baseball player
- Nick Adduci (1929–2005), American football player
