= 1989 New York Mets season =

1989 New York Mets
- League: National League
- Division: East
- Ballpark: Shea Stadium
- City: New York
- Record: 87–75 (.537)
- Divisional place: 2nd
- Owners: Fred Wilpon and Nelson Doubleday, Jr.
- General manager: Frank Cashen
- Manager: Davey Johnson
- Television: WWOR-TV/SportsChannel New York (Ralph Kiner, Steve Zabriskie, Tim McCarver, Fran Healy, Rusty Staub)
- Radio: WFAN (Bob Murphy, Gary Cohen); WJIT (Spanish) (Juan Alicea, Billy Berroa, Armando Talavera)

The 1989 New York Mets season was the 28th regular season for the Mets. They went 87–75 and finished second in the National League East, six games behind the first place Chicago Cubs. They were managed by Davey Johnson. They played home games at Shea Stadium.

== Offseason ==
- December 11, 1988: José Martínez was signed as an amateur free agent by the Mets.
- February 20, 1989: Don Aase was signed as a free agent by the Mets.
- March 2, 1989: Darryl Strawberry threw a punch at Keith Hernandez during team picture day. The two shouted at each other and were restrained by teammates until Strawberry left the area.
- March 30, 1989: Mike Maksudian was released by the Mets.

== Regular season ==
=== Season standings ===
NL East
| Team | W | L | Pct. | GB | Home | Road |
|---|---|---|---|---|---|---|
| Chicago Cubs | 93 | 69 | .574 | — | 48‍–‍33 | 45‍–‍36 |
| New York Mets | 87 | 75 | .537 | 6 | 51‍–‍30 | 36‍–‍45 |
| St. Louis Cardinals | 86 | 76 | .531 | 7 | 46‍–‍35 | 40‍–‍41 |
| Montreal Expos | 81 | 81 | .500 | 12 | 44‍–‍37 | 37‍–‍44 |
| Pittsburgh Pirates | 74 | 88 | .457 | 19 | 39‍–‍42 | 35‍–‍46 |
| Philadelphia Phillies | 67 | 95 | .414 | 26 | 38‍–‍42 | 29‍–‍53 |

=== Record vs. opponents ===
1989 National League record Sources:
| Team | ATL | CHC | CIN | HOU | LAD | MON | NYM | PHI | PIT | SD | SF | STL |
|---|---|---|---|---|---|---|---|---|---|---|---|---|
| Atlanta | — | 5–7 | 8–10 | 8–10 | 6–10 | 6–6 | 2–10 | 8–4 | 4–8 | 7–11 | 6–12 | 3–9 |
| Chicago | 7–5 | — | 7–5 | 5–7 | 7–5 | 10–8 | 10–8 | 10–8 | 12–6 | 8–4 | 6–6 | 11–7 |
| Cincinnati | 10–8 | 5–7 | — | 8–10 | 8–10 | 4–8 | 4–8 | 4–8 | 7–5 | 9–9 | 8–10 | 8–4 |
| Houston | 10–8 | 7–5 | 10–8 | — | 10–8 | 4–8 | 6–6 | 9–3 | 7–5 | 8–10 | 8–10 | 7–5 |
| Los Angeles | 10–6 | 5–7 | 10–8 | 8–10 | — | 7–5 | 5–7 | 6–6 | 7–5 | 6–12 | 10–8 | 3–9 |
| Montreal | 6–6 | 8–10 | 8–4 | 8–4 | 5–7 | — | 9–9 | 9–9 | 11–7 | 5–7 | 7–5 | 5–13 |
| New York | 10–2 | 8–10 | 8–4 | 6–6 | 7–5 | 9–9 | — | 12–6 | 9–9 | 5–7 | 3–9 | 10–8 |
| Philadelphia | 4–8 | 8–10 | 8–4 | 3–9 | 6–6 | 9–9 | 6–12 | — | 10–8 | 2–10 | 4–8 | 7–11 |
| Pittsburgh | 8–4 | 6–12 | 5–7 | 5–7 | 5–7 | 7–11 | 9–9 | 8–10 | — | 3–9 | 5–7 | 13–5 |
| San Diego | 11–7 | 4–8 | 9–9 | 10–8 | 12–6 | 7–5 | 7–5 | 10–2 | 9–3 | — | 8–10 | 2–10 |
| San Francisco | 12–6 | 6–6 | 10–8 | 10–8 | 8–10 | 5–7 | 9–3 | 8–4 | 7–5 | 10–8 | — | 7–5 |
| St. Louis | 9–3 | 7–11 | 4–8 | 5–7 | 9–3 | 13–5 | 8–10 | 11–7 | 5–13 | 10–2 | 5–7 | — |

=== Opening Day starters ===
- Gary Carter
- Kevin Elster
- Dwight Gooden
- Keith Hernandez
- Gregg Jefferies
- Howard Johnson
- Kevin McReynolds
- Darryl Strawberry
- Mookie Wilson

=== Notable transactions ===
- June 9, 1989: Lou Thornton was signed as a free agent by the Mets.
- June 18, 1989: Lenny Dykstra, Roger McDowell and a player to be named later were traded by the Mets to the Philadelphia Phillies for Juan Samuel. The Mets completed the deal by sending Tom Edens to the Phillies on July 27.
- July 31, 1989: Mookie Wilson was traded by the Mets to the Toronto Blue Jays in exchange for Jeff Musselman and Mike Brady (minors).
- July 31, 1989: Rick Aguilera, David West, Kevin Tapani, Tim Drummond and a player to be named later were traded by the Mets to the Minnesota Twins for Frank Viola. The Mets completed the deal by sending Jack Savage to the Twins on October 16.

== Roster ==
1989 New York Mets
Roster
| Pitchers: 49 Don Aase; 38 Rick Aguilera; 38 Blaine Beatty; 44 David Cone; 12,15 Ron Darling; 50 Sid Fernandez; 16 Dwight Gooden; 36 Manny Hernandez; 40 Jeff Innis; 26 Terry Leach; 31 Julio Machado; 42 Roger McDowell; 43 John Mitchell; 13 Jeff Musselman; 48 Randy Myers; 19 Bob Ojeda; 26 Kevin Tapani; 26 Frank Viola; 46 David West; 47 Wally Whitehurst | Catchers: 8 Gary Carter; 39 Phil Lombardi; 33 Barry Lyons; 2 Mackey Sasser; Infielders: 21 Kevin Elster; 17 Keith Hernandez; 9 Gregg Jefferies; 20 Howard Johnson; 10,29 Dave Magadan; 15 Jeff McKnight; 25 Keith Miller; 27 Tom O'Malley; 35 Craig Shipley; 11 Tim Teufel | Outfielders: 32 Mark Carreon; 4 Lenny Dykstra; 13 Lee Mazzilli; 22 Kevin McReynolds; 7 Juan Samuel; 18 Darryl Strawberry; 4 Lou Thornton; 1 Mookie Wilson | Manager: 5 Davey Johnson; Coaches: 3 Bud Harrelson; 52 Greg Pavlick; 34 Sam Perlozzo; 28 Bill Robinson; 30 Mel Stottlemyre |

== Game log ==
=== Regular season ===
1989 Game Log
Overall: 87–75 (Home: 51–30; Away: 36–45)
April: 12–10

| # | Date | Time (ET) | Opponent | Score | Win | Loss | Save | Time of Game | Attendance | Record | Box/ Streak | GB |

May: 13–14

| # | Date | Time (ET) | Opponent | Score | Win | Loss | Save | Time of Game | Attendance | Record | Box/ Streak | GB |

June: 15–11

| # | Date | Time (ET) | Opponent | Score | Win | Loss | Save | Time of Game | Attendance | Record | Box/ Streak | GB |

July: 13–15

| # | Date | Time (ET) | Opponent | Score | Win | Loss | Save | Time of Game | Attendance | Record | Box/ Streak | GB |
|---|---|---|---|---|---|---|---|---|---|---|---|---|
| – | July 11 | | **1989 Major League Baseball All-Star Game** at Anaheim Stadium in Anaheim | | | | | | | | | |

August: 19–10

| # | Date | Time (ET) | Opponent | Score | Win | Loss | Save | Time of Game | Attendance | Record | Box/ Streak | GB |

September: 14–15

| # | Date | Time (ET) | Opponent | Score | Win | Loss | Save | Time of Game | Attendance | Record | Box/ Streak | GB |

October: 1–0

| # | Date | Time (ET) | Opponent | Score | Win | Loss | Save | Time of Game | Attendance | Record | Box/ Streak | GB |

Legend: = Win = Loss = Postponement
Bold = Mets team member

== Player stats ==
=== Batting ===
==== Starters by position ====
Note: Pos = Position; G = Games played; AB = At bats; H = Hits; Avg. = Batting average; HR = Home runs; RBI = Runs batted in

| Pos | Player | G | AB | H | Avg. | HR | RBI |
|---|---|---|---|---|---|---|---|
| C | Barry Lyons | 79 | 235 | 58 | .247 | 3 | 27 |
| 1B | Dave Magadan | 127 | 374 | 107 | .286 | 4 | 41 |
| 2B | Gregg Jefferies | 141 | 508 | 131 | .258 | 12 | 56 |
| 3B | Howard Johnson | 153 | 571 | 164 | .287 | 36 | 101 |
| SS | Kevin Elster | 151 | 458 | 106 | .231 | 10 | 55 |
| LF | Kevin McReynolds | 148 | 545 | 148 | .272 | 22 | 85 |
| CF | Juan Samuel | 86 | 333 | 76 | .228 | 3 | 28 |
| RF | Darryl Strawberry | 134 | 476 | 107 | .225 | 29 | 77 |

==== Other batters ====
Note: G = Games played; AB = At bats; H = Hits; Avg. = Batting average; HR = Home runs; RBI = Runs batted in

| Player | G | AB | H | Avg. | HR | RBI |
|---|---|---|---|---|---|---|
| Mookie Wilson | 80 | 249 | 51 | .205 | 3 | 18 |
| Tim Teufel | 83 | 219 | 56 | .256 | 2 | 15 |
| Keith Hernandez | 75 | 215 | 50 | .233 | 4 | 19 |
| Mackey Sasser | 72 | 182 | 53 | .291 | 1 | 22 |
| Lenny Dykstra | 56 | 159 | 43 | .270 | 3 | 13 |
| Gary Carter | 50 | 153 | 28 | .183 | 2 | 15 |
| Keith Miller | 57 | 143 | 33 | .231 | 1 | 7 |
| Mark Carreon | 68 | 133 | 41 | .308 | 6 | 16 |
| Lee Mazzilli | 48 | 60 | 11 | .183 | 2 | 7 |
| Phil Lombardi | 18 | 48 | 11 | .229 | 1 | 3 |
| Lou Thornton | 13 | 13 | 4 | .308 | 0 | 1 |
| Jeff McKnight | 6 | 12 | 3 | .250 | 0 | 0 |
| Tom O'Malley | 9 | 11 | 6 | .545 | 0 | 8 |
| Craig Shipley | 4 | 7 | 1 | .143 | 0 | 0 |

=== Pitching ===
==== Starting pitchers ====
Note: G = Games pitched; IP = Innings pitched; W = Wins; L = Losses; ERA = Earned run average; SO = Strikeouts

| Player | G | IP | W | L | ERA | SO |
|---|---|---|---|---|---|---|
| David Cone | 34 | 219.2 | 14 | 8 | 3.52 | 190 |
| Sid Fernandez | 35 | 219.1 | 14 | 5 | 2.83 | 198 |
| Ron Darling | 33 | 217.1 | 14 | 14 | 3.52 | 153 |
| Bob Ojeda | 31 | 192.0 | 13 | 11 | 3.47 | 95 |
| Dwight Gooden | 19 | 118.1 | 9 | 4 | 2.89 | 101 |
| Frank Viola | 12 | 85.1 | 5 | 5 | 3.38 | 73 |

==== Other pitchers ====
Note: G = Games pitched; IP = Innings pitched; W = Wins; L = Losses; ERA = Earned run average; SO = Strikeouts

| Player | G | IP | W | L | ERA | SO |
|---|---|---|---|---|---|---|
| David West | 11 | 24.1 | 0 | 2 | 7.40 | 19 |
| Blaine Beatty | 2 | 6.0 | 0 | 0 | 1.50 | 3 |

==== Relief pitchers ====
Note: G = Games pitched; W = Wins; L = Losses; SV = Saves; ERA = Earned run average; SO = Strikeouts

| Player | G | W | L | SV | ERA | SO |
|---|---|---|---|---|---|---|
| Randy Myers | 65 | 7 | 4 | 24 | 2.35 | 88 |
| Don Aase | 49 | 1 | 5 | 2 | 3.94 | 34 |
| Rick Aguilera | 36 | 6 | 6 | 7 | 2.34 | 80 |
| Jeff Innis | 29 | 0 | 1 | 0 | 3.18 | 16 |
| Roger McDowell | 25 | 1 | 5 | 4 | 3.31 | 15 |
| Jeff Musselman | 20 | 3 | 2 | 0 | 3.08 | 11 |
| Terry Leach | 10 | 0 | 0 | 0 | 4.22 | 2 |
| Julio Machado | 10 | 0 | 1 | 0 | 3.27 | 14 |
| Wally Whitehurst | 9 | 0 | 1 | 0 | 4.50 | 9 |
| Kevin Tapani | 3 | 0 | 0 | 0 | 3.68 | 2 |
| John Mitchell | 2 | 0 | 1 | 0 | 6.00 | 4 |
| Manny Hernández | 1 | 0 | 0 | 0 | 0.00 | 1 |

== Awards and honors ==
- Gary Carter, Catcher, Roberto Clemente Award

== Farm system ==
| Level | Team | League | Manager |
|---|---|---|---|
| AAA | Tidewater Tides | International League | Mike Cubbage |
| AA | Jackson Mets | Texas League | Steve Swisher |
| A | St. Lucie Mets | Florida State League | Clint Hurdle |
| A | Columbia Mets | South Atlantic League | Bill Stein |
| A-Short Season | Pittsfield Mets | New York–Penn League | Tim Blackwell |
| Rookie | Kingsport Mets | Appalachian League | Jim Eschen |
| Rookie | GCL Mets | Gulf Coast League | John Tamargo |
