= Ken Howell =

American baseball player (1960–2018)

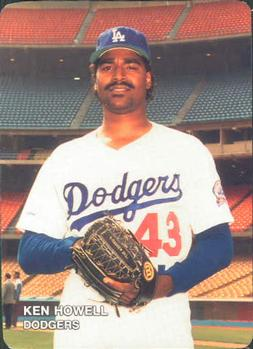
- Pitcher
- Born: November 28, 1960; Detroit, Michigan, U.S.
- Died: November 9, 2018 (aged 57); West Bloomfield, Michigan, U.S.
- Batted: Right Threw: Right

MLB debut
- June 25, 1984, for the Los Angeles Dodgers

Last MLB appearance
- August 5, 1990, for the Philadelphia Phillies

MLB statistics
- Win–loss record: 38–48
- Earned run average: 3.95
- Strikeouts: 549
- Saves: 31
- Stats at Baseball Reference

Teams
- Los Angeles Dodgers (1984–1988); Philadelphia Phillies (1989–1990)

Kenneth Howell, Jr. (November 28, 1960 – November 9, 2018) was an American professional baseball pitcher and pitching coach, who played in Major League Baseball (MLB) for the Los Angeles Dodgers and Philadelphia Phillies from 1984 through 1990. During his playing days, Howell stood 6 ft 3 in (1.91 m) tall, weighing 200 pounds (91 kg). He batted and threw right-handed.

== Early life and amateur career ==
Howell was born in Detroit, Michigan and attended Northwestern High School (Michigan) in his home city. He continued his education at the Tuskegee Institute, graduating in 1982. In 1981, he played collegiate summer baseball with the Cotuit Kettleers of the Cape Cod Baseball League.

== Playing career ==
Howell was selected by the Dodgers in the 3rd round, 73rd pick overall, of the 1982 Major League Baseball draft out of Tuskegee, after being scouted by Tony John. As of 2018, he was the only player to ever be drafted out of Tuskegee. He made his MLB debut on June 25, 1984, at Dodger Stadium. Howell pitched a scoreless 9th inning, allowing two singles, in a 9–4 loss to the San Diego Padres. His first start was on July 3 of the same year, against the Pittsburgh Pirates, allowing three earned runs in 5.2 innings to take the loss. His first career win came in an extra innings game against the St. Louis Cardinals three days later. He was 5–5 with a 3.33 ERA for the Dodgers that season, including six saves (the first of which occurred on August 3 against the Cincinnati Reds).

In his first full major league season in 1985, Howell recorded a 4–7 with a 3.77 ERA and saved 12 of 16 opportunities. Howell's lone appearance in baseball's postseason came in Game 3 of that year's National League Championship Series. On the road in St. Louis, Howell pitched two scoreless innings and struck out two batters in the Dodgers' 4–2 loss to the eventual-NL champion St. Louis Cardinals.

Howell made a career-high 62 appearances in 1986, going 6–12 with a 3.87 ERA and saving 12 of 21 opportunities. His production dwindled the following year, appearing in just 40 games with a 4.91 ERA, saving just one of five chances and pitching in more lower-leverage situations. After surgery in the offseason to remove the tip of his clavicle, Howell spent most of 1988 in the minor leagues; his lone midseason callup saw him give up nine runs (eight earned) on 15 hits in six innings against the Atlanta Braves. He made three appearances after September call-ups, allowing one earned run in 6.2 innings, but was not included in any postseason roster for the Dodgers, who went on to win the World Series that season. Over parts of five seasons in Los Angeles. he acquired an 18–29 record and 4.04 ERA in 194 games, with 4 starts and 31 saves. His final appearance as a Dodger came on September 28, 1988 against the Padres in a game that earlier saw Orel Hershiser break the record for consecutive scoreless innings pitched with 10 scoreless innings; Howell came on in the 14th inning and pitched 2.2 innings scoreless, but his walk in the 16th came around to score when Ricky Horton surrendered a walk-off, two-run home run to the next batter to lose, 2–1.

Howell was involved in a pair of trades involving the Baltimore Orioles during a five-day span in early-December 1988. He was acquired along with Brian Holton and Juan Bell from the Dodgers for Eddie Murray on the 4th, then sent with Gordon Dillard to the Philadelphia Phillies for Phil Bradley on the 9th. The second transaction addressed the Phillies' need for starting pitching and the Orioles' for right-handed hitting.

Howell experienced a resurgence with the Phillies in 1989 as a full time starter for the first time in his career. He started 32 of 33 games, with a 12–12 record and a 3.44 ERA. The following year, Howell had an ERA of 3.31 through his first 13 starts before making three poor starts and being forced to the disabled list with a shoulder injury. He returned to the rotation in late July to make what would be the final two pitching appearances of his career before the shoulder injury returned him to the disabled list. In total, he made 18 starts in 1990 with an 8–7 record and 4.64 ERA. Howell's final big league appearance came on August 5, 1990, at Veterans Stadium. While he left the game after four innings, trailing the Pittsburgh Pirates 5–2, Von Hayes and John Kruk led a Phillies rally to beat Pittsburgh, 8–6. Howell underwent season-ending surgery in August.

Injury issues caused Howell to miss the rest of the 1990 season and most of 1991 and 1992, appearing in only 6 games in AAA in 1991 and none at all in 1992. Howell attempted a comeback with the Texas Rangers in 1993, but after 6 appearances (4 starts) for the Gulf Coast Rangers he was released. He then played in 1994 for the San Bernardino Spirit before retiring.

== Coaching career ==
He returned to the Dodgers in 2003 as the pitching coach for the Vero Beach Dodgers in Class-A and was subsequently promoted to pitching coach for the AA Jacksonville Suns in 2005 and AAA Las Vegas 51s from 2006 to 2007.

In 2008, Howell joined the Dodgers' Major League coaching staff as the bullpen coach, a position he held through 2012 under Managers Joe Torre and Don Mattingly. On November 13, 2012, he became the Assistant Pitching Coach for the Dodgers and remained in that position through the 2015 season.

== Personal life ==
Howell suffered from diabetes, complications of which resulted in the amputation of one of his toes in 2008.

Howell was rushed to the hospital on February 6, 2015, when it was found he was suffering from kidney failure. It was later discovered he was suffering from pancreatic necrosis, an anaerobic infection, as well as other health complications. Howell underwent multiple surgeries, and later texted to the media that he was "doing much better."

Howell died on November 9, 2018 in West Bloomfield, Michigan. He was 57 years old.

Preceded by Dan Warthen	Los Angeles Dodgers Bullpen Coach; 2008-2012	Succeeded by Chuck Crim
