= Paul Householder =

American baseball player (born 1958)

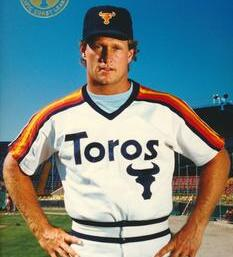
- Householder with the Tucson Toros c. 1987
- Right Fielder
- Born: September 4, 1958 (age 67); Columbus, Ohio, U.S.
- Batted: Switch Threw: Right

MLB debut
- August 26, 1980, for the Cincinnati Reds

Last MLB appearance
- June 3, 1987, for the Houston Astros

MLB statistics
- Batting average: .236
- Home runs: 29
- Runs batted in: 144
- Stats at Baseball Reference

Teams
- Cincinnati Reds (1980–1984); St. Louis Cardinals (1984); Milwaukee Brewers (1985–1986); Houston Astros (1987)

Paul Wesley Householder (born September 4, 1958) is an American former professional baseball right fielder. He played during eight seasons at the major league level with the Cincinnati Reds, St. Louis Cardinals, Milwaukee Brewers, and Houston Astros of Major League Baseball (MLB).

== Early years ==
Householder was born on September 4, 1958, in Columbus, Ohio.

== Playing career ==
=== Minor leagues ===
He was drafted by the Reds in the 2nd round of the 1976 amateur draft from North Haven High School.

Householder played his first professional season with their Rookie league Billings Mustangs in 1976, and split his last season between Houston and their Triple-A club, the Tucson Toros, in 1987.

=== Major leagues ===
==== Cincinnati Reds ====
Householder made his MLB debut with the Reds on August 26, 1980, playing 20 games, producing a batting average of .244. He again saw limited action in the strike-shortened season of 1981, though improved his batting average to .275. Householder started 100 games for the Reds in 1982, but batted only .211, producing a negative WAR. 1983 was Householder's best season with the Reds, starting 95 games with a batting average of .255. In 1984, he was traded to the St Louis Cardinals for John Stuper.

==== St Louis Cardinals ====
After appearing in just 13 games with the Cardinals, Householder was traded with Jim Adduci to the Milwaukee Brewers in exchange for Rich Buonantony, Jim Koontz and Ron Koenigsfield.

==== Milwaukee Brewers ====
Householder played two seasons with the Brewers before being granted free agent status after the 1986 season.

==== Houston Astros ====
Householder saw limited action with the Astros in 1987, and was granted free agency at the end of the season.
