= 1989 Cincinnati Reds season =

1989 Cincinnati Reds
- League: National League
- Division: West
- Ballpark: Riverfront Stadium
- City: Cincinnati
- Record: 75–87 (.463)
- Divisional place: 5th
- Owners: Marge Schott
- General managers: Murray Cook
- Managers: Pete Rose, Tommy Helms
- Television: WLWT (Jay Randolph, Johnny Bench, Thom Brennaman)
- Radio: WLW (Marty Brennaman, Joe Nuxhall)

The 1989 Cincinnati Reds season was the 120th season for the franchise in Major League Baseball, and their 20th and 19th full season at Riverfront Stadium. The season was defined by allegations of gambling by Pete Rose. Before the end of the season, Rose was banned from baseball by commissioner A. Bartlett Giamatti.

== Offseason ==
- November 5, 1988: Skeeter Barnes was signed as a free agent with the Cincinnati Reds.
- December 2, 1988: Rick Mahler signed as a free agent with the Cincinnati Reds.
- December 8, 1988: Rolando Roomes was traded by the Chicago Cubs to the Cincinnati Reds for Lloyd McClendon.
- December 13, 1988: Nick Esasky and Rob Murphy are traded by the Cincinnati Reds to the Boston Red Sox for Todd Benzinger, Jeff Sellers and a player to be named later.
- December 21, 1988: Manny Trillo signed as a free agent with the Cincinnati Reds.
- December 21, 1988: Joel Youngblood was signed as a free agent with the Cincinnati Reds.
- December 21, 1988: Ken Griffey, Sr. was released by the Cincinnati Reds.
- January 12, 1989: The Cincinnati Reds acquire Luis Vasquez (minors) from the Boston Red Sox to complete the December 13, 1988 trade.
- March 28, 1989: Randy St. Claire was released by the Cincinnati Reds.
- March 30, 1989: Kent Tekulve signed as a free agent with the Cincinnati Reds.
- March 30, 1989: Ken Griffey, Sr. signed as a free agent with the Cincinnati Reds.

== Ohio Cup ==
The first Ohio Cup, which was an annual pre-season baseball game was played in 1989. The single-game cup was played at Cooper Stadium (then home of the AAA International League Columbus Clippers) in Columbus, Ohio, and was staged just days before the start of each new Major League Baseball season.

No.	Year	Winner	Runner-up	Score	Venue	Date	Attendance
1	1989	Indians	Reds	1-0	Cooper Stadium	April 2	15,978

== Regular season ==
=== Season standings ===
NL West
Team	W	L	Pct.	GB	Home	Road
San Francisco Giants	92	70	.568	—	53‍–‍28	39‍–‍42
San Diego Padres	89	73	.549	3	46‍–‍35	43‍–‍38
Houston Astros	86	76	.531	6	47‍–‍35	39‍–‍41
Los Angeles Dodgers	77	83	.481	14	44‍–‍37	33‍–‍46
Cincinnati Reds	75	87	.463	17	38‍–‍43	37‍–‍44
Atlanta Braves	63	97	.394	28	33‍–‍46	30‍–‍51

=== Record vs. opponents ===
1989 National League record Sources:
Team	ATL	CHC	CIN	HOU	LAD	MON	NYM	PHI	PIT	SD	SF	STL
Atlanta	—	5–7	8–10	8–10	6–10	6–6	2–10	8–4	4–8	7–11	6–12	3–9
Chicago	7–5	—	7–5	5–7	7–5	10–8	10–8	10–8	12–6	8–4	6–6	11–7
Cincinnati	10–8	5–7	—	8–10	8–10	4–8	4–8	4–8	7–5	9–9	8–10	8–4
Houston	10–8	7–5	10–8	—	10–8	4–8	6–6	9–3	7–5	8–10	8–10	7–5
Los Angeles	10–6	5–7	10–8	8–10	—	7–5	5–7	6–6	7–5	6–12	10–8	3–9
Montreal	6–6	8–10	8–4	8–4	5–7	—	9–9	9–9	11–7	5–7	7–5	5–13
New York	10–2	8–10	8–4	6–6	7–5	9–9	—	12–6	9–9	5–7	3–9	10–8
Philadelphia	4–8	8–10	8–4	3–9	6–6	9–9	6–12	—	10–8	2–10	4–8	7–11
Pittsburgh	8–4	6–12	5–7	5–7	5–7	7–11	9–9	8–10	—	3–9	5–7	13–5
San Diego	11–7	4–8	9–9	10–8	12–6	7–5	7–5	10–2	9–3	—	8–10	2–10
San Francisco	12–6	6–6	10–8	10–8	8–10	5–7	9–3	8–4	7–5	10–8	—	7–5
St. Louis	9–3	7–11	4–8	5–7	9–3	13–5	8–10	11–7	5–13	10–2	5–7	—

=== Notable transactions ===
- May 25, 1989: Manny Trillo was released by the Cincinnati Reds.
- July 18, 1989: Tim Leary was traded by the Los Angeles Dodgers with Mariano Duncan to the Cincinnati Reds for Kal Daniels and Lenny Harris.

=== Notable games ===
- On August 3, 1989, at Riverfront Stadium against the Houston Astros, the Reds set or tied several team, National League, and major league records by scoring 14 runs on 16 hits in the first inning. The bottom of the first inning lasted 38 minutes, and the first eight consecutive batters reached base. The Reds won the game 18-2.

=== Pete Rose: Permanent ineligibility ===
Amid reports that he had bet on baseball, Rose was questioned in February 1989 by outgoing commissioner Peter Ueberroth and his replacement, Bart Giamatti. Rose denied the allegations and Ueberroth dropped the investigation. However, after Giamatti became Commissioner, three days later, lawyer John Dowd was retained to investigate these charges against Rose. A Sports Illustrated cover story published on March 21, 1989, gave the public their first detailed report of the allegations that Rose had placed bets on baseball games.

Dowd interviewed many of Rose's associates, including alleged bookies and bet runners. He delivered a summary of his findings to the Commissioner in May, a document which became known as the Dowd Report. In it, Dowd documented Rose's alleged gambling activities in 1985 and 1986 and compiled a day-by-day account of Rose's alleged betting on baseball games in 1987. The Dowd Report documented his alleged bets on 52 Reds games in 1987, where Rose wagered a minimum of $10,000 a day. Others involved in the allegations claim that number was actually $2,000 a day.

According to the Dowd Report itself, "no evidence was discovered that Rose bet against the Reds." This is in contrast to the case of "Shoeless" Joe Jackson and his teammates in the Black Sox Scandal, who were accused of intentionally losing the 1919 World Series.

Rose continued to deny all of the accusations against him and refused to appear at a hearing with Giamatti on the matter. He filed a lawsuit alleging that the Commissioner had prejudged the case and could not provide a fair hearing. A Cincinnati judge issued a temporary restraining order to delay the hearing, but Giamatti fought to have the case moved to Federal Court. The Commissioner prevailed in that effort, after which he and Rose entered settlement negotiations.

On August 24, 1989, Rose voluntarily accepted a permanent place on baseball's ineligible list. Rose accepted that there was a factual reason for the ban; in return, Major League Baseball agreed to make no formal finding with regard to the gambling allegations. According to baseball's rules, Rose could reapply for reinstatement. Rose, with a 412-373 record, was replaced as Reds manager by Tommy Helms. Rose began therapy with a psychiatrist for treatment of a gambling addiction.

=== Roster ===
1989 Cincinnati Reds
Roster
Pitchers: 40 Jack Armstrong; 48 Tim Birtsas; 32 Tom Browning; 37 Norm Charlton; 49 Rob Dibble; 31 John Franco; 35 Mike Griffin; 20 Danny Jackson; 54 Tim Leary; 42 Rick Mahler; 27 José Rijo; 33 Ron Robinson; 56 Rosario Rodríguez; 55 Mike Roesler; 45 Bob Sebra; 43 Kent Tekulve	Catchers: 6 Bo Díaz; 8 Terry McGriff; 9 Joe Oliver; 34 Jeff Reed; Infielders: 25 Todd Benzinger; 51 Marty Brown; 7 Mariano Duncan; 7 Lenny Harris; 11 Barry Larkin; 28 Scotti Madison; 16 Ron Oester; 10 Luis Quiñones; 15 Jeff Richardson; 17 Chris Sabo; 9 Manny Trillo	Outfielders: 22 Dave Collins; 28 Kal Daniels; 44 Eric Davis; 30 Ken Griffey; 21 Paul O'Neill; 36 Rolando Roomes; 26 Van Snyder; 29 Herm Winningham; 12 Joel Youngblood; Other batters: 15 Skeeter Barnes	Manager: 19 Tommy Helms; 14 Pete Rose; Coaches: 2 Scott Breeden (Pitching); 4 Dave Bristol (Third Base); 19 Tommy Helms; 3 Jim Lett (Bench); 23 Lee May (First Base); 24 Tony Pérez (Hitting)

== Player stats ==
=== Batting ===
Note: Pos = Position; G = Games played; AB = At bats; H = Hits; Avg. = Batting average; HR = Home runs; RBI = Runs batted in

Pos	Player	G	AB	H	Avg.	HR	RBI
C	Jeff Reed	102	287	64	.223	3	23
1B	Todd Benzinger	161	628	154	.245	17	76
2B	Ron Oester	109	305	75	.246	1	14
SS	Barry Larkin	97	325	111	.342	4	36
3B	Chris Sabo	82	304	79	.260	6	29
LF	Ken Griffey	106	236	62	.263	8	30
CF	Eric Davis	131	462	130	.281	34	101
RF	Paul O'Neill	117	428	118	.276	15	74

==== Other batters ====
Note: G = Games played, AB = At bats; H = Hits; Avg. = Batting average; HR = Home runs; RBI = Runs batted in

Player	G	AB	H	Avg.	HR	RBI
Luis Quiñones	97	340	83	.244	12	34
Rolando Roomes	107	315	83	.263	7	34
Herm Winningham	115	251	63	.251	3	13
Lenny Harris	61	188	42	.223	2	11
Mariano Duncan	45	174	43	.247	3	13
Joe Oliver	49	151	41	.272	3	23
Kal Daniels	44	133	29	.218	2	9
Bo Díaz	43	132	27	.205	1	8
Jeff Richardson	53	125	21	.168	2	11
Joel Youngblood	76	118	25	.212	3	13
Dave Collins	78	106	25	.236	0	7
Scotti Madison	40	98	17	.173	1	7
Manny Trillo	17	39	8	.205	0	0
Marty Brown	16	30	5	.167	0	4
Terry McGriff	6	11	3	.273	0	2
Van Snider	8	7	1	.143	0	0
Skeeter Barnes	5	3	0	.000	0	0

=== Starting pitchers ===
Note: G = Games pitched; IP = Innings pitched; W = Wins; L = Losses; ERA = Earned run average; SO = Strikeouts

Player	G	IP	W	L	ERA	SO
Tom Browning	37	249.2	15	12	3.39	118
Rick Mahler	40	220.2	9	13	3.83	102
Danny Jackson	20	115.2	6	11	5.60	70
José Rijo	19	111.0	7	6	2.84	86
Tim Leary	14	89.2	2	7	3.71	64
Ron Robinson	15	83.1	5	3	3.35	36

==== Other pitchers ====
Note: G = Games pitched; IP = Innings pitched; W = Wins; L = Losses; ERA = Earned run average; SO = Strikeouts

Player	G	IP	W	L	ERA	SO
Scott Scudder	23	100.1	4	9	4.49	66
Jack Armstrong	9	42.2	2	3	4.64	23

===== Relief pitchers =====
Note: G = Games Pitched; W = Wins; L = Losses; SV = Saves; ERA = Earned run average; SO = Strikeouts

Player	G	W	L	SV	ERA	SO
John Franco	60	4	8	32	3.12	60
Rob Dibble	74	10	5	2	2.09	141
Norm Charlton	69	8	3	0	2.93	98
Tim Birtsas	42	2	2	1	3.75	57
Kent Tekulve	37	0	3	1	5.02	31
Mike Roesler	17	0	1	0	3.96	14
Bob Sebra	15	0	0	1	6.43	14
Rosario Rodríguez	7	1	1	0	4.15	0
Mike Griffin	3	0	0	0	12.46	1

== Farm system ==
Level	Team	League	Manager
AAA	Nashville Sounds	American Association	Frank Lucchesi
AA	Chattanooga Lookouts	Southern League	Jim Tracy
A	Cedar Rapids Reds	Midwest League	Gary Denbo
A	Greensboro Hornets	South Atlantic League	Dave Miley
Rookie	GCL Reds	Gulf Coast League	Sam Mejías
Rookie	Billings Mustangs	Pioneer League	Dave Keller
