= Milt Thompson (baseball) =

American baseball player (born 1959)

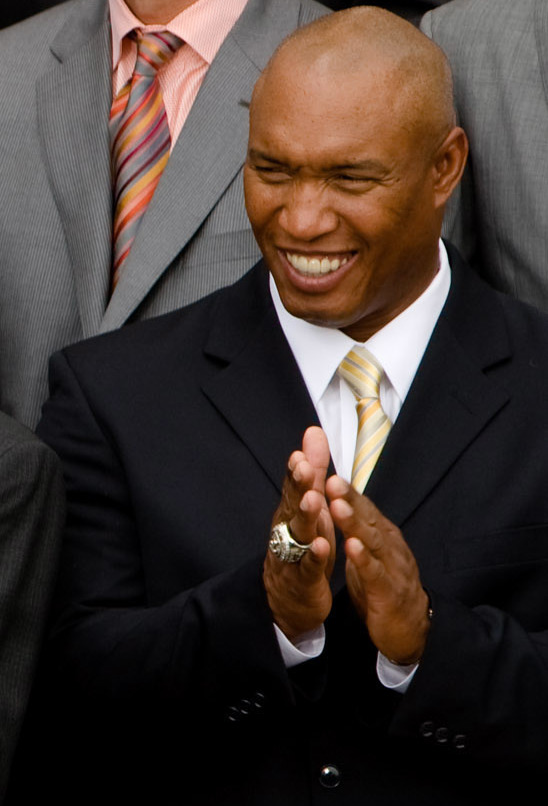
- Thompson at the White House in 2009
- Outfielder
- Born: January 5, 1959 (age 67); Washington, D.C., U.S.
- Batted: Left Threw: Right

MLB debut
- September 4, 1984, for the Atlanta Braves

Last MLB appearance
- July 28, 1996, for the Colorado Rockies

MLB statistics
- Batting average: .274
- Home runs: 47
- Runs batted in: 357
- Stats at Baseball Reference

Teams
- As player: Atlanta Braves (1984–1985); Philadelphia Phillies (1986–1988); St. Louis Cardinals (1989–1992); Philadelphia Phillies (1993–1994); Houston Astros (1994–1995); Los Angeles Dodgers (1996); Colorado Rockies (1996); As coach: Philadelphia Phillies (2004–2010)

Career highlights and awards
- World Series champion (2008)

Milton Bernard Thompson (born January 5, 1959), is an American former professional baseball outfielder, pinch hitter, and coach, who played in Major League Baseball (MLB) for the Atlanta Braves, Philadelphia Phillies, St. Louis Cardinals, Houston Astros, Los Angeles Dodgers, and Colorado Rockies. He returned as the Cincinnati Reds’ minor league hitting instructor, for the 2019 season. Over his MLB career, Thompson compiled a batting average of .274.

== Major league career ==
The Atlanta Braves drafted Thompson in the 2nd round (29th overall) of the 1979 draft, out of Howard University. He made his big league debut, five years later, in 1984. After two years in Atlanta, as a part-time left fielder, the Braves traded Thompson, along with Steve Bedrosian, to the Phillies, for Ozzie Virgil and Pete Smith. Thompson continued to impress, batting .251, .302, and .288, respectively, in his three seasons in Philadelphia.

On December 16, 1988, Thompson was traded to the St. Louis Cardinals, for Steve Lake and Curt Ford, where he spent four years and posted his highest batting average ever, .307, in 1991. Following the 1992 season, Thompson was granted free agency and elected to return to the Phillies.

As a key component in the Phillies’ last-to-first-place 1993 National League Championship team, Thompson platooned in left field with Pete Incaviglia, in the World Series, against the Toronto Blue Jays.

On July 31, 1994, Thompson was traded by Philadelphia to the Houston Astros for pitcher Tom Edens. After the 1994 season, Thompson was granted free agency. He elected to re-sign with Houston for another year. After the 1995 season, Thompson was again a free agent, and signed with the Los Angeles Dodgers; on June 27, 1996, he was selected off waivers by the Colorado Rockies. His career with the Rockies lasted just over 5 weeks, as Thompson received his unconditional release on August 2, 1996, thus ending his big league playing career.

== Coaching career ==
In 1997, Thompson became the minor league outfield/base-running coordinator in the Tampa Bay Devil Rays organization. In 1998, he joined the Philadelphia Phillies as a minor league coach. Thompson lasted there for two seasons, until taking 2000 off, then returned as a minor league base-running/outfield coordinator, again in the Phillies farm system.

In 2004, Thompson joined the major league Phillies' staff as first base coach. The next year, he became the team's hitting coach, where he remained for five-plus seasons. During Thompson's tenure as batting coach, the Phillies have led the league twice in runs scored, even though they have alternated between only 2nd and 3rd place in their respective division due to pitching difficulties. He was one of the few coaches not fired by the organization in 2005. As the hitting coach of the 2008 Philadelphia Phillies, Thompson earned the first World Series ring of his career. He would return to the World Series in 2009, where the Phillies lost to the New York Yankees, in six games.

Having played for the 1993 National League Champions, Thompson joined Larry Bowa and John Vukovich as the only Phillies in franchise history to go to the World Series as both a player and coach for the club.

On Thursday, July 22, 2010, Thompson was relieved of his duties as the Phillies’ hitting coach, being replaced by former Minor League hitting coach Greg Gross. Thompson was hired by the Houston Astros that November, as their minor league outfield/base-running coordinator. He became a coach for the Kansas City Royals’ Single–A affiliate, the Wilmington Blue Rocks, in 2014. Thompson joined the Cincinnati Reds organization, as a minor league hitting instructor, in 2017.

On July 2, 2026, Thompson was announced as the hitting coach for the American League at the All-Star Futures Game.

== Personal life ==
Thompson has four daughters. He resides in Washington Township, Gloucester County, New Jersey, with his family.

== Trivia ==
- Hit .313 with 6 RBI in 1993 World Series and set a Phillies record with 5 RBI in Game 4 at Veterans Stadium.
- Attended Colonel Zadok A. Magruder High School and Howard University
- Graduated from high school in 1977, where, among playing baseball, he played football and ran track
- Is well known for his incredible feats in left field during the early 1990s, including catching several balls over the fence. One famous play took place on April 29, 1993, in the bottom of the eighth inning against the Padres, with the Phillies up by 2, and the bases loaded, with two outs. Thompson robbed the Padres of a grand slam, to end the inning, snatching a ball back, from over the wall.
- Resides in Sewell, NJ (Washington Twp., Gloucester Cty.)
- Now with the Reds, as a minor league hitting instructor.

== See also ==
- List of Major League Baseball career stolen bases leaders
