= Curt Ford =

American baseball player (born 1960)

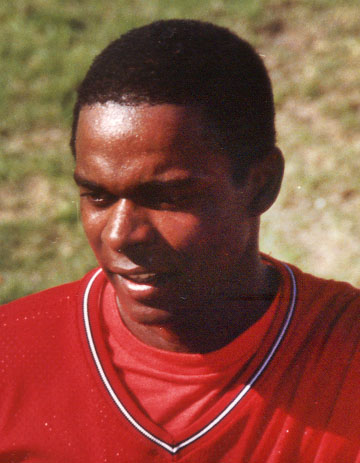
- Outfielder
- Born: October 11, 1960 (age 65); Jackson, Mississippi, U.S.
- Batted: Left Threw: Right

MLB debut
- June 22, 1985, for the St. Louis Cardinals

Last MLB appearance
- May 27, 1990, for the Philadelphia Phillies

MLB statistics
- Batting average: .245
- Home runs: 7
- Runs batted in: 89
- Stats at Baseball Reference

Teams
- St. Louis Cardinals (1985–1988); Philadelphia Phillies (1989–1990)

Curtis Glenn Ford (born October 11, 1960) is an American former professional baseball outfielder, who played in Major League Baseball (MLB) for the St. Louis Cardinals and Philadelphia Phillies, from 1985 through 1990.

== Career ==
Ford attended Murrah High School then Jackson State University and played college baseball for the Jackson State Tigers. The St. Louis Cardinals selected Ford in the fourth round of the 1981 Major League Baseball (MLB) Draft. He made his MLB debut with the Cardinals on June 22, 1985. He batted .308 in the 1987 World Series for the Cardinals versus the Minnesota Twins. After the 1988 season, the Cardinals traded Ford and Steve Lake to the Philadelphia Phillies for Milt Thompson. In his MLB career, Ford had seven home runs, 89 runs batted in, and a batting average of .245.

In 1995, Ford was a replacement player in spring training for the Florida Marlins during the ongoing strike.

On May 12, 2010, Ford was announced as the new manager of the Springfield Sliders, a wood-bat collegiate baseball team in the Prospect League in Springfield, Illinois. Ford replaced Jack Clark.

== Personal life ==
On March 25, 2015, Ford was punched at a St. Louis gas station by an attacker shouting racial slurs. The following day he said he may move away from the St. Louis area.
