= Gordon Dillard =

American baseball player (born 1964)

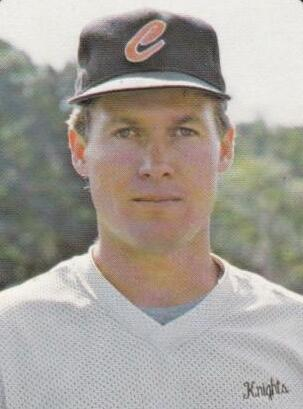
- Dillard with the Charlotte Knights c. 1988
- Pitcher
- Born: May 20, 1964 (age 62); Salinas, California
- Batted: Left Threw: Left

MLB debut
- August 12, 1988, for the Baltimore Orioles

Last MLB appearance
- May 16, 1989, for the Philadelphia Phillies

MLB statistics
- Win–loss record: 0–0
- Earned run average: 6.43
- Strikeouts: 4
- Stats at Baseball Reference

Teams
- Baltimore Orioles (1988); Philadelphia Phillies (1989)

Gordon Lee Dillard (born May 20, 1964) is an American former professional baseball pitcher. He played in Major League Baseball (MLB) for the Baltimore Orioles (1988) and Philadelphia Phillies (1989). His 1988 season was split between the Charlotte Knights (7–5, 2.19 ERA), Rochester Red Wings (0–2, 2.45 ERA) and two appearances without a decision with the Orioles. He was traded along with Ken Howell from the Orioles to the Phillies for Phil Bradley on December 9, 1988.
