= Jeff Parrett =

American baseball player (born 1961)

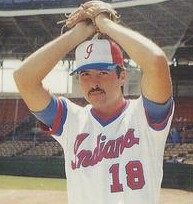
- Pitcher
- Born: August 26, 1961 (age 64); Indianapolis, Indiana, U.S.
- Batted: Right Threw: Right

MLB debut
- April 11, 1986, for the Montreal Expos

Last MLB appearance
- September 28, 1996, for the Philadelphia Phillies

MLB statistics
- Win–loss record: 56–43
- Earned run average: 3.80
- Strikeouts: 616
- Stats at Baseball Reference

Teams
- Montreal Expos (1986–1988); Philadelphia Phillies (1989–1990); Atlanta Braves (1990–1991); Oakland Athletics (1992); Colorado Rockies (1993); St. Louis Cardinals (1995–1996); Philadelphia Phillies (1996)

Jeffrey Dale Parrett (born August 26, 1961) is an American former professional baseball pitcher. He played in Major League Baseball (MLB) for the Montreal Expos (1986–88), Philadelphia Phillies (1989–90 and 1996), Atlanta Braves (1990–91), Oakland Athletics (1992), Colorado Rockies (1993) and St. Louis Cardinals (1995–96).

== Career ==
He graduated from Lafayette High School in Lexington, Kentucky, in 1979. He then played for University of Kentucky. In 1982, he played collegiate summer baseball with the Wareham Gatemen of the Cape Cod Baseball League and was named a league all-star.

He helped the Braves win the 1991 National League Pennant, the Athletics win the 1992 American League Western Division, and the Cardinals win the 1996 National League Central Division.

In ten years, he had a 56–43 win–loss record and appeared in 491 games (11 starts).
