= Alex Madrid =

American baseball player (born 1963)

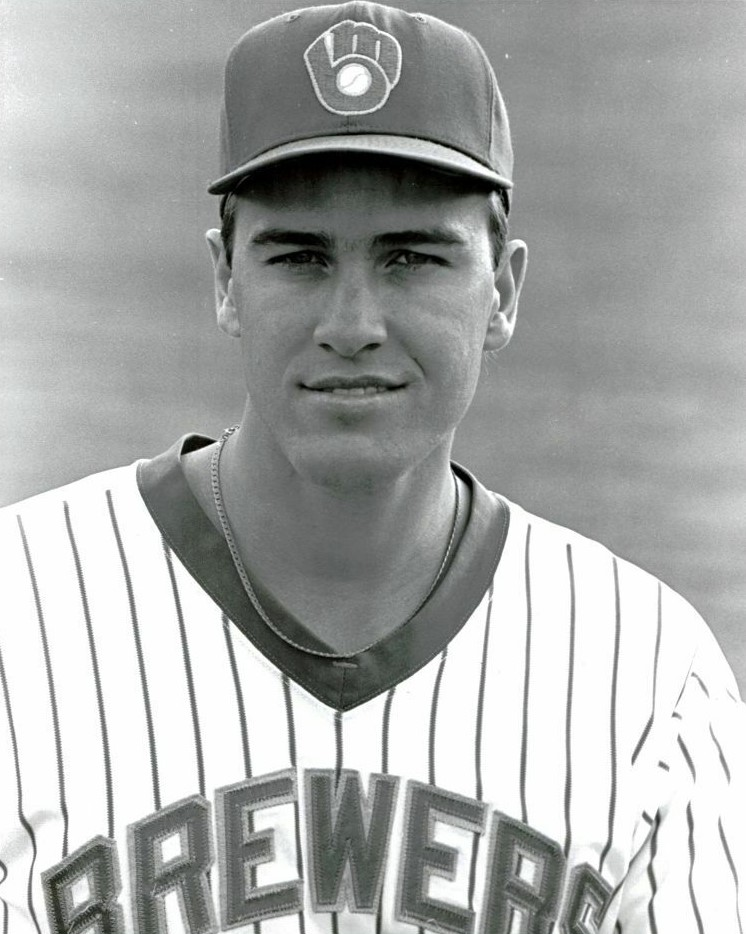
- Pitcher
- Born: April 18, 1963 (age 62); Springerville, Arizona, U.S.
- Batted: Right Threw: Right

MLB debut
- July 20, 1987, for the Milwaukee Brewers

Last MLB appearance
- May 30, 1989, for the Philadelphia Phillies

MLB statistics
- Win–loss record: 2–3
- Earned run average: 5.63
- Strikeouts: 16

Teams
- Milwaukee Brewers (1987); Philadelphia Phillies (1988–1989)

Alexander Madrid (born April 18, 1963) is an American former right-handed Major League Baseball pitcher who played from 1987 to 1989 for the Milwaukee Brewers and Philadelphia Phillies. He was 6 ft 3 in (1.91 m) and he weighed 200 pounds.

== Before professional baseball ==
Prior to playing professional baseball, he attended Yavapai College.

== The draft ==
Madrid was drafted four different times. He was first drafted in the second round of the 1982 January phase draft by the Chicago Cubs. He was then drafted by the Cincinnati Reds in the second round of the 1982 June Secondary draft. In the January Secondary phase draft, he was taken by the Texas Rangers in the first round. He finally signed after being drafted by the Brewers in the second round of the 1983 June Secondary draft.

== The minor leagues ==
Madrid began his professional career with the Beloit Brewers in 1984, going 6–7 with a 4.19 ERA in 22 games started. He played for the Stockton Ports in 1985, and in 1986 he went 12–9 with a 6.03 ERA for the El Paso Diablos. With the Denver Zephyrs in 1987, Madrid went 5–7 with a 5.35 ERA.

== First trip to the Major Leagues ==
Despite doing poorly in the minor leagues in 1987, Madrid still earned a call up to the Major Leagues, and on July 20, 1987, he made his big league debut. In his first game, while facing the Seattle Mariners, he pitched 1 2/3 innings, allowing four hits and three earned runs. Still, the Brewers won the game 13–11. He would pitch two more games in 1987, going 0–0 with a 15.19 ERA in 5 1/3 innings overall. He allowed 11 hits, nine earned runs and one walk.

== 1988 ==
Madrid began the 1988 season with Denver, going 5–2 with a 4.06 ERA for them. On August 24, he was traded to the Phillies for Mike Young, and then pitched two games for the Maine Phillies, going 0–0 with a 2.32 ERA. Overall, he went 5–2 with a 3.86 ERA in the minor leagues in 1988.

He pitched a few games for the big league Phillies that season, going 1–1 with a 2.76 ERA. He even threw a complete game, although it was a rain-shortened affair.

== 1989 ==
He pitched in both the big leagues and minor leagues in 1989. In the minors, he went 3–6 with a 4.84 ERA for the Scranton/Wilkes-Barre Red Barons. He went 1–2 with a 5.47 ERA in the majors that year. On May 30, he appeared in his final major league game.

== 1990 ==
Although he would not appear in the majors after 1989, Madrid did pitch in the minors until 1990, splitting time between the Clearwater Phillies and Red Barons. For the Clearwater Phillies, he went 1–1 with an 0.95 ERA. With the Red Barons, he went 3–8 with a 4.65 ERA. In total, he went 4–9 with a 4.02 ERA that season.

== Major league totals ==
In the major leagues, Madrid went 2–3 with a 5.63 ERA in 14 games (five started). In 46 1/3 innings, he allowed 58 hits, 30 runs, 29 earned runs and four home runs. He walked 21 batters, struck out 16 and threw five wild pitches.
