= John Costello (baseball) =

American baseball player (born 1960)

- Pitcher
- Born: December 24, 1960 (age 65); The Bronx, New York, U.S.
- Batted: Right Threw: Right

MLB debut
- June 2, 1988, for the St. Louis Cardinals

Last MLB appearance
- October 5, 1991, for the San Diego Padres

MLB statistics
- Win–loss record: 11–6
- Earned run average: 2.97
- Strikeouts: 104
- Stats at Baseball Reference

Teams
- St. Louis Cardinals (1988–1990); Montreal Expos (1990); San Diego Padres (1991)

John Reilly Costello (born December 24, 1960) is an American former relief pitcher in Major League Baseball who played for the St. Louis Cardinals (1988-1990), Montreal Expos (1990) and San Diego Padres (1991). He batted and threw right-handed.

Costello graduated from Oceanside High School in Oceanside, New York in 1979 and then played college baseball at Mercyhurst where he led all of NCAA with a 1.12 earned run average in 1982.

In a four-season career, Costello posted an 11–6 record with a 2.97 earned run average and four saves in 119 games pitched.
