= Matt Kinzer =

American baseball and football player (born 1963)

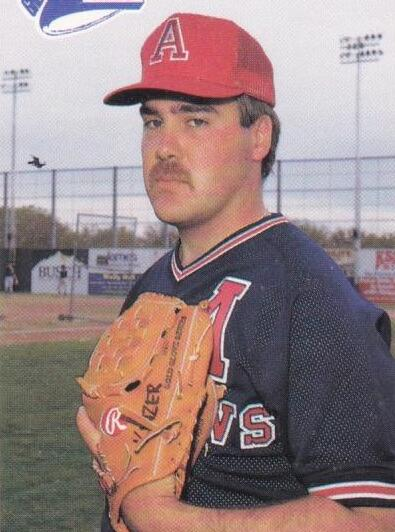
- Kinzer with the Arkansas Travelers c. 1988
- Pitcher
- Born: June 17, 1963 (age 63); Indianapolis, Indiana, U.S.
- Batted: Right Threw: Right

MLB debut
- May 18, 1989, for the St. Louis Cardinals

Last MLB appearance
- May 26, 1990, for the Detroit Tigers

MLB statistics
- Win–loss record: 0–2
- Earned run average: 13.20
- Strikeouts: 9
- Stats at Baseball Reference

Teams
- St. Louis Cardinals (1989); Detroit Tigers (1990)

Matthew Roy Kinzer (born June 17, 1963) is an American former National Football League punter and Major League Baseball pitcher. He was drafted by the St. Louis Cardinals in the 2nd round of the 1984 amateur draft. During the 1987 NFL strike, he served one game as a punter for the Detroit Lions. He recorded seven punts for a 34.0 yard average.

Kinzer begin his pro baseball career in the minor leagues playing from 1984 to 1989, He played for the Arkansas Travelers of the double A Texas League in 1984. After stops in Springfield with the Cardinals of the class A Midwest League in 1985 and the St. Petersburg Cardinals of the class A Florida State League in 1986, he returned to the Arkansas Travelers in 1987 and 1988. But in 1988, Kinzer also saw playing time in the Major Leagues with the St. Louis Cardinals. In 1989 Kinzer played for triple A Louisville Cardinals of the American Association and also saw time with the St. Louis Cardinals. He had a record of 34–25. He made his MLB debut on May 18, 1989, for the St. Louis Cardinals, pitching 3.1 innings, giving up one hit and striking out three versus the Houston Astros. He pitched in seven more games (one start) and gave up 19 earned runs in 13.1 innings to finish with an 0–2 record and a 12.83 ERA. On May 26, 1990, he pitched his only game of the season for the Detroit Tigers against the Chicago White Sox. He pitched 1.2 innings, giving up three hits, three walks, three earned runs, and struck out one batter. It would be his last game in the major leagues. In nine career games he has an 0–2 record and a 13.20 ERA.

Kinzer is the only person to have played for both the Detroit Lions and the Detroit Tigers.

After his major league days he served as a scout for the Tampa Bay Devil Rays and worked as a player agent. Kinzer returned to scouting in 2010, with the Florida/Miami Marlins, then joined the Atlanta Braves with the same role in October 2015.

== Head coaching record ==
Record table
Season	Team	Overall	Conference	Standing	Postseason
IPFW Mastodons (Great Lakes Valley Conference) (1993–1994)
1993	IPFW	5–27	1–15	10th	
1994	IPFW	25–15	8–8	6th	
IPFW:		30–43	9–23		
Total:		30–43			
National champion Postseason invitational champion Conference regular season champion Conference regular season and conference tournament champion Division regular season champion Division regular season and conference tournament champion Conference tournament champion
