= Steve Jeltz =

American baseball player (born 1959)

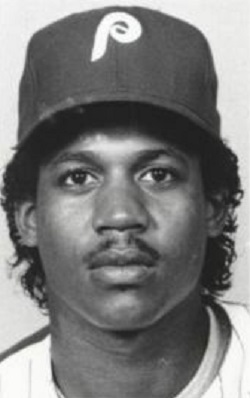
- Shortstop
- Born: May 28, 1959 (age 67); Paris, France
- Batted: Switch Threw: Right

MLB debut
- July 17, 1983, for the Philadelphia Phillies

Last MLB appearance
- October 3, 1990, for the Kansas City Royals

MLB statistics
- Batting average: .210
- Home runs: 5
- Runs batted in: 130
- Stats at Baseball Reference

Teams
- Philadelphia Phillies (1983–1989); Kansas City Royals (1990)

Career highlights and awards
- June 8, 1989 [home run from both sides of the plate in a single game]. Pittsburgh Pirates vs. Phillies

Larry Steven Jeltz (born May 28, 1959) is a French-born American former professional baseball player. He played in parts of eight seasons in Major League Baseball (MLB) with the Philadelphia Phillies and Kansas City Royals. Jeltz primarily played shortstop and batted .210 in his career. Jeltz is one of only a handful of MLB players to be born in France, and he leads that nation's MLB players in several career statistical categories.

== Biography ==
Jeltz was born in Paris to a military family. When he was young, Jeltz moved with his family to Lawrence, Kansas, where he attended Lawrence High School. He then attended the University of Kansas. He set the school's stolen base record with 65. Jeltz spent three years in college before he was drafted by the Phillies in the ninth round of the 1980 MLB draft. He made his MLB debut in 1983.

On June 8, 1989, Jeltz hit two of his five career home runs in a game against the Pittsburgh Pirates, despite not even starting the game. A switch-hitter, Jeltz hit one of these homers from the right side of the plate and one from the left side. This was the first time in the history of the Phillies that this feat had been accomplished. It was in this same game that, after the Pirates scored 10 runs in the top of the first, Pirates broadcaster Jim Rooker said on the air, "If we lose this game, I'll walk back to Pittsburgh." The Phillies came back to win 15–11, and after the season Rooker conducted a 300-mile charity walk from Philadelphia to Pittsburgh.

In 1990, Jeltz spent his last MLB season with the Kansas City Royals. He did not play much, and Jeltz said that he was distracted by issues facing his brother, who died by suicide in 1991. After retiring as a player, Jeltz became a bail bondsman and bounty hunter, and then he entered the construction business. In 2003, he had surgery to remove a benign brain tumor.

Jeltz holds the records for most games played, at bats, runs, hits, doubles, triples, runs batted in, walks and strikeouts among players born in France, and second in home runs (behind Bruce Bochy). In total, only seven major league players have been born in France as of 2025.
