= Jim Adduci (baseball, born 1959) =

American baseball player (born 1959)

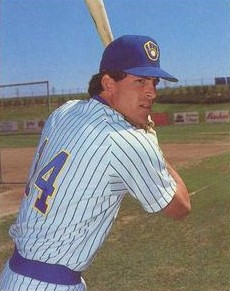
- Outfielder / First baseman
- Born: August 9, 1959 (age 65); Chicago, Illinois, U.S.
- Batted: Left Threw: Left

MLB debut
- September 12, 1983, for the St. Louis Cardinals

Last MLB appearance
- July 26, 1989, for the Philadelphia Phillies

MLB statistics
- Batting average: .236
- Home runs: 1
- Runs batted in: 15

NPB statistics
- Batting average: .268
- Home runs: 13
- Runs batted in: 48
- Stats at Baseball Reference

Teams
- St. Louis Cardinals (1983); Milwaukee Brewers (1986); Yokohama Taiyo Whales (1987); Milwaukee Brewers (1988); Philadelphia Phillies (1989)

James David Adduci (born August 9, 1959) is an American former professional baseball outfielder and first baseman. He played in Major League Baseball (MLB) for the St. Louis Cardinals, Milwaukee Brewers, and Philadelphia Phillies, and in Nippon Professional Baseball (NPB) for the Yokohama Taiyo Whales. He attended Southern Illinois University, where he played college baseball. He is the father of former MLB player Jim Adduci.

== Career ==
On June 7, 1977, Adduci, after graduating from Chicago's Brother Rice High school, was drafted by the Philadelphia Phillies in the 28th round of the amateur draft. However, Adduci chose to continue his education instead. On June 3, 1980, Adduci was drafted by the St. Louis Cardinals in the 7th round of the amateur draft.

Adduci made his major league debut on September 12, 1983, with the Cardinals. Adduci was hitless in his only at bat in his debut. That year, Adduci had a batting average of .050 in 20 at bats. On October 2, 1984, he was traded with Paul Householder to the Milwaukee Brewers for three minor leaguers. Adduci made his Brewers debut in 1986, and had a batting average of .091 in 11 at-bats that season.

On April 19, 1987, Adduci was purchased by the San Francisco Giants from the Milwaukee Brewers, only to be sent back to Milwaukee a week later. On June 4, 1987, the Brewers released Adduci. Adduci finished 1987 playing for the Yokohama Taiyo Whales in Japan.

Adduci re-signed with the Brewers on January 18, 1988. That season, he had a batting average of .266 in 94 at-bats. Since he had three sacrifice flies, his on-base percentage was lower than his batting average, which is a very rare occurrence in Major League Baseball.

Prior to the 1989 season, Adduci was sent to the Philadelphia Phillies, hitting .368 in 19 at-bats. Adduci played his final major league game on July 26, 1989. After the 1989 season, he was granted free agency and never returned to the major leagues.

Adduci had a career batting average of .236, in 144 at-bats over the course of 70 games. All 15 of his career runs batted in came in the 1988 season, as well as his only career home run.

== Post-playing career ==
After retirement following a 1990 season spent in the minor leagues, the Chicago native Adduci entered DePaul University, and in 1991 he earned a communications media degree. He ran summer baseball camps for the cities of Evergreen Park and Oak Lawn. As parents requested private instruction for their children, Adduci decided to open a storefront children's baseball school in Chicago, and ran it there through the summer of 1992.

As of 1993, Adduci was living in Evergreen Park, with his wife, two daughters and a son. He was running the baseball school in a more spacious location in Tinley Park. Fellow ex-professionals Steve Otto and Tim Pyznarski were on staff helping Adduci as instructors.

Although feeling professional baseball was too much of a business and that he did not get a shot at a major-league career, Adduci said he loved baseball and building up kids' self-esteem by teaching them the sport. During his playing career, he befriended players like Paul Molitor and Andy Van Slyke, who named Adduci the godfather of his son.

Currently, Adduci works for the Chicago Bulls/Sox Training Academy as the director of the White Sox Elite baseball program and as a hitting instructor.
