= Steve Lake =

American baseball player (born 1957)

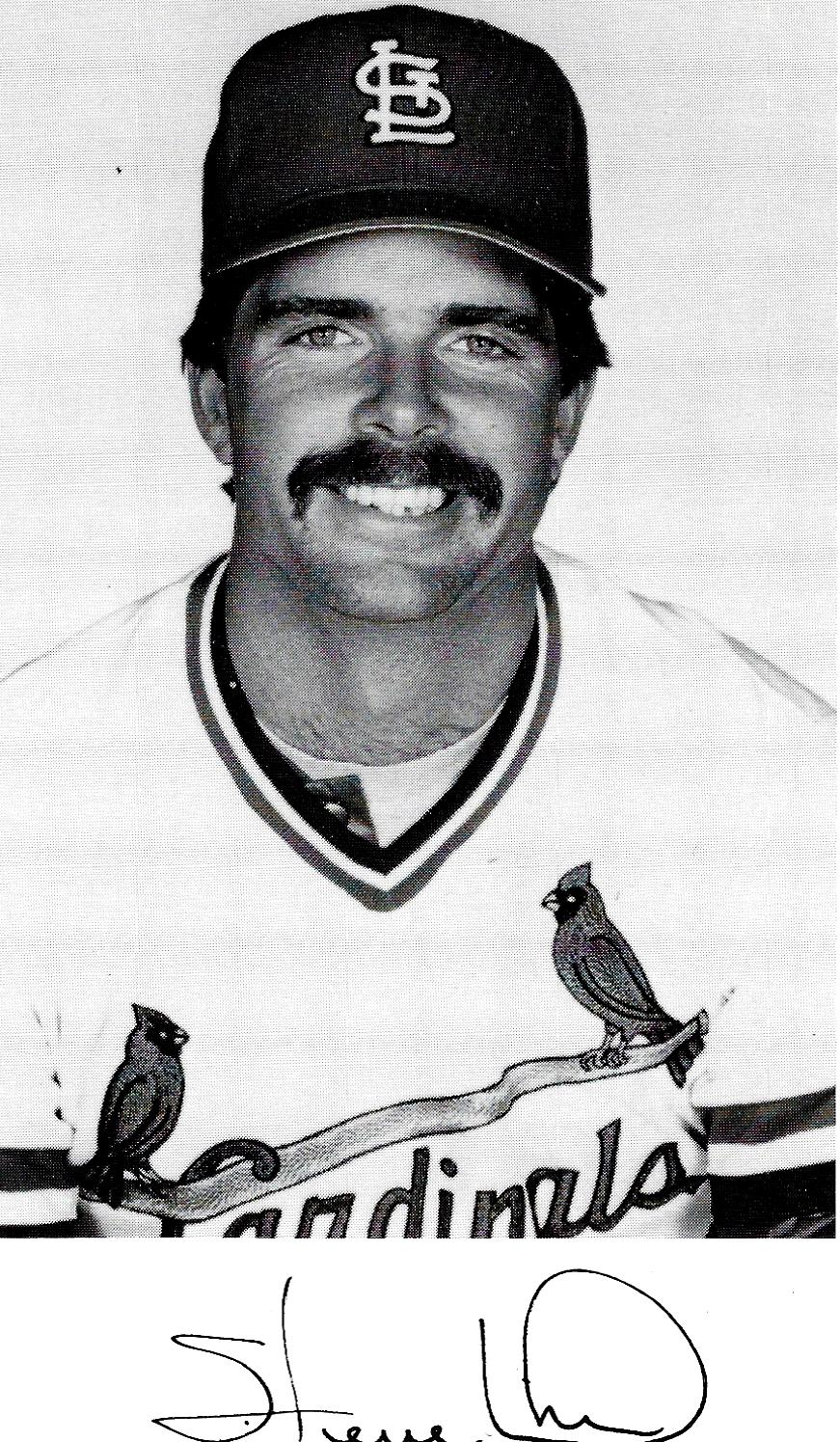
- Catcher
- Born: March 14, 1957 (age 69); Inglewood, California, U.S.
- Batted: Right Threw: Right

MLB debut
- April 9, 1983, for the Chicago Cubs

Last MLB appearance
- September 22, 1993, for the Chicago Cubs

MLB statistics
- Batting average: .237
- Home runs: 18
- Runs batted in: 108
- Stats at Baseball Reference

Teams
- Chicago Cubs (1983–1986); St. Louis Cardinals (1986–1988); Philadelphia Phillies (1989–1992); Chicago Cubs (1993)

Steven Michael Lake (born March 14, 1957) is an American former professional baseball backup catcher, who played in Major League Baseball (MLB) from 1983 to 1993 for the Chicago Cubs, St. Louis Cardinals, and Philadelphia Phillies, Lake batted and threw right-handed.

Lake started Game 7 of the 1987 World Series for the Cardinals and went 1-for-3 with an RBI single. Over his career, he threw out 45.43% of the base runners who tried to steal a base on him, ranking him 9th on the all-time list.

He may be best remembered for a 1991 Studio baseball card which featured his pet bird, Ruffles.

His children include Ryan Lake, Brendan Lake, and Jordan Parkes.
