= 1990 Atlanta Braves season =

1990 Atlanta Braves
- League: National League
- Division: West
- Ballpark: Atlanta–Fulton County Stadium
- City: Atlanta
- Record: 65–97 (.401)
- Divisional place: 6th
- Owners: Ted Turner
- General managers: Bobby Cox, John Schuerholz
- Managers: Russ Nixon, Bobby Cox
- Television: WTBS; TBS Superstation (Pete Van Wieren, Skip Caray, Don Sutton); SportSouth (Ernie Johnson)
- Radio: WSB (Pete Van Wieren, Skip Caray, Don Sutton, Dave O'Brien)

The 1990 Atlanta Braves season was the team's 25th season in Atlanta, the 115th in franchise history as a member of the National League and the 120th season overall. The Braves went 65–97, en route to their sixth-place finish in the National League West, 26 games behind the World Champion Cincinnati Reds, and ending up with the worst record that year. On June 22, Bobby Cox replaced Russ Nixon as the team's manager, a job Cox would hold for the next two decades.

== Offseason ==
- November 20, 1989: Mark Eichhorn was released by the Atlanta Braves.
- December 15, 1989: Gerald Perry and Jim LeMasters (minors) were traded by the Braves to the Kansas City Royals for Charlie Leibrandt and Rick Luecken.
- December 17, 1989: Ricky Trlicek was traded by the Braves to the Toronto Blue Jays for Ernie Whitt and Kevin Batiste.

== Regular season ==
- July 4, 1990: Ron Gant had 6 RBIs in one game against the New York Mets.
- David Justice won the National League Rookie of the Year Award.

=== Season standings ===
NL West
Team	W	L	Pct.	GB	Home	Road
Cincinnati Reds	91	71	.562	—	46‍–‍35	45‍–‍36
Los Angeles Dodgers	86	76	.531	5	47‍–‍34	39‍–‍42
San Francisco Giants	85	77	.525	6	49‍–‍32	36‍–‍45
Houston Astros	75	87	.463	16	49‍–‍32	26‍–‍55
San Diego Padres	75	87	.463	16	37‍–‍44	38‍–‍43
Atlanta Braves	65	97	.401	26	37‍–‍44	28‍–‍53

=== Record vs. opponents ===
1990 National League record Sources:
Team	ATL	CHC	CIN	HOU	LAD	MON	NYM	PHI	PIT	SD	SF	STL
Atlanta	—	6–6	8–10	5–13	6–12	6–6	4–8	5–7	5–7	8–10	5–13	7–5
Chicago	6–6	—	4–8	6–6	3–9	11–7	9–9	11–7	4–14	8–4	7–5	8–10
Cincinnati	10–8	8–4	—	11–7	9–9	9–3	6–6	7–5	6–6	9–9	7–11	9–3
Houston	13–5	6–6	7–11	—	9–9	5–7	5–7	5–7	5–7	4–14	10–8	6–6
Los Angeles	12–6	9–3	9–9	9–9	—	6–6	5–7	8–4	4–8	9–9	8–10	7–5
Montreal	6–6	7–11	3–9	7–5	6–6	—	8–10	10–8	13–5	7–5	7–5	11–7
New York	8–4	9–9	6–6	7–5	7–5	10–8	—	10–8	10–8	5–7	7–5	12–6
Philadelphia	7-5	7–11	5–7	7–5	4–8	8–10	8–10	—	6–12	7–5	8–4	10–8
Pittsburgh	7–5	14–4	6–6	7–5	8–4	5–13	8–10	12–6	—	10–2	8–4	10–8
San Diego	10–8	4–8	9–9	14–4	9–9	5–7	7–5	5–7	2–10	—	7–11	3–9
San Francisco	13–5	5–7	11–7	8–10	10–8	5–7	5–7	4–8	4–8	11–7	—	9–3
St. Louis	5–7	10–8	3–9	6–6	5–7	7–11	6–12	8–10	8–10	9–3	3–9	—

=== Notable transactions ===
- April 30, 1990: Sergio Valdez was selected off waivers from the Braves by the Cleveland Indians.
- May 2, 1990: Greg Tubbs was traded by the Braves to the Pittsburgh Pirates for Rico Rossy.
- July 12, 1990: Derek Lilliquist was traded by the Braves to the San Diego Padres for Mark Grant.
- July 23, 1990: Marvin Freeman was traded by the Philadelphia Phillies to the Braves for Joe Boever.
- August 3, 1990: Dale Murphy was traded by the Braves with a player to be named later to the Philadelphia Phillies for players to be named later and Jeff Parrett. The Braves sent Tommy Greene (August 9, 1990) to the Phillies to complete the trade. The Phillies sent Jim Vatcher (August 9, 1990) and Víctor Rosario (September 4, 1990) to the Braves to complete the trade.
- August 16, 1990: Billy Taylor was signed as a free agent by the Braves.

==== Draft picks ====
- June 4, 1990: 1990 Major League Baseball draft
  - Chipper Jones was drafted by the Braves in the 1st round.
  - Joe Ayrault was drafted by the Braves in the 5th round.

=== Roster ===
1990 Atlanta Braves
Roster
Pitchers: 42 Steve Avery; 37 Joe Boever; 36 Tony Castillo; 48 Marty Clary; 40 Marvin Freeman; 47 Tom Glavine; 55 Mark Grant; 33 Tommy Greene; 46 Dwayne Henry; 38 Joe Hesketh; 32 Charlie Leibrandt; 24 Derek Lilliquist; 49 Rick Luecken; 34 Paul Marak; 50 Kent Mercker; 33 Jeff Parrett; 52 Rusty Richards; 43 Doug Sisk; 25 Pete Smith; 29 John Smoltz; 30 Mike Stanton; 34 Sergio Valdez	Catchers: 17 Jimmy Kremers; 38 Kelly Mann; 10 Greg Olson; 12 Ernie Whitt; Infielders: 11,38 Mike Bell; 4 Jeff Blauser; 19 Francisco Cabrera; 7 Jody Davis; 17 Nick Esasky; 16 Tommy Gregg; 8 Alexis Infante; 23 David Justice; 20 Mark Lemke; 18 Jim Presley; 8 Victor Rosario; 14 Andrés Thomas; 15 Jeff Treadway	Outfielders: 37 Gerónimo Berroa; 5 Ron Gant; 1 Oddibe McDowell; 3 Dale Murphy; 27 Lonnie Smith; 24 Jim Vatcher	Manager: 6 Bobby Cox (June 23rd-end of season); 2 Russ Nixon (through June 22); Coaches: 39 Bruce Dal Canton (pitching) (through June 22); 54 Leo Mazzone (pitching) (June 23rd-end of season); 22 Jimy Williams (third base); 28 Clarence Jones (hitting); 26 Roy Majtyka (assistant); 55 Brian Snitker (bullpen); 9 Bobby Wine (first base) (through June 22); 39 Pat Corrales (first base) (June 23-end of season)

== Player stats ==
=== Batting ===
==== Starters by position ====
Note: Pos = Position; G = Games played; AB = At bats; H = Hits; Avg. = Batting average; HR = Home runs; RBI = Runs batted in

Pos	Player	G	AB	H	Avg.	HR	RBI
C	Greg Olson	100	298	78	.262	7	36
1B	David Justice	127	439	124	.282	28	78
2B	Jeff Treadway	128	474	134	.283	11	59
SS	Jeff Blauser	115	386	104	.269	8	39
3B	Jim Presley	140	541	131	.242	19	72
LF	Lonnie Smith	135	466	142	.305	9	42
CF	Ron Gant	152	575	174	.303	32	84
RF	Dale Murphy	97	349	81	.232	17	55

==== Other batters ====
Note: G = Games played; AB = At bats; H = Hits; Avg. = Batting average; HR = Home runs; RBI = Runs batted in

Player	G	AB	H	Avg.	HR	RBI
Oddibe McDowell	113	305	74	.243	7	25
Andres Thomas	84	278	61	.219	5	30
Mark Lemke	102	239	54	.226	0	21
Tommy Gregg	124	239	63	.264	5	32
Ernie Whitt	67	180	31	.172	2	10
Francisco Cabrera	63	137	38	.277	7	25
Jimmy Kremers	29	73	8	.110	1	2
Mike Bell	36	45	11	.244	1	5
Nick Esasky	9	35	6	.171	0	0
Alexis Infante	20	28	1	.036	0	0
Jody Davis	12	28	2	.071	0	1
Kelly Mann	11	28	4	.143	1	2
Jim Vatcher	21	27	7	.259	0	3
Víctor Rosario	9	7	1	.143	0	0
Geronimo Berroa	7	4	0	.000	0	0

=== Pitching ===
==== Starting pitchers ====
Note: G = Games pitched; IP = Innings pitched; W = Wins; L = Losses; ERA = Earned run average; SO = Strikeouts

Player	G	IP	W	L	ERA	SO
John Smoltz	34	231.1	14	11	3.85	170
Tom Glavine	33	214.1	10	12	4.28	129
Charlie Leibrandt	24	162.0	9	11	3.16	76
Pete Smith	13	77.0	5	6	4.79	56
Derek Lilliquist	12	61.2	2	8	6.28	34
Paul Marak	7	39.0	1	2	3.69	15

==== Other pitchers ====
Note: G = Games pitched; IP = Innings pitched; W = Wins; L = Losses; ERA = Earned run average; SO = Strikeouts

Player	G	IP	W	L	ERA	SO
Marty Clary	33	101.2	1	10	5.67	44
Steve Avery	21	99.0	3	11	5.64	75
Tommy Greene	5	12.1	1	0	8.03	4

==== Relief pitchers ====
Note: G = Games pitched; W = Wins; L = Losses; SV = Saves; ERA = Earned run average; SO = Strikeouts

Player	G	W	L	SV	ERA	SO
Joe Boever	33	1	3	8	4.68	35
Tony Castillo	52	5	1	1	4.23	64
Rick Luecken	36	1	4	1	5.77	35
Kent Mercker	36	4	7	7	3.17	39
Dwayne Henry	34	2	2	0	5.63	34
Mark Grant	33	1	2	3	4.64	40
Joe Hesketh	31	0	2	5	5.81	21
Charlie Kerfeld	25	3	1	2	5.58	27
Jeff Parrett	20	1	1	1	3.00	17
Marvin Freeman	9	1	0	0	1.72	12
Mike Stanton	7	0	3	2	18.00	7
Sergio Valdez	6	0	0	0	6.75	3
Doug Sisk	3	0	0	0	3.86	1
Rusty Richards	1	0	0	0	27.00	0

== Award winners ==
- David Justice, Player of the Month, August
- David Justice, National League Rookie of the Year Award

1990 Major League Baseball All-Star Game

- Greg Olson, catcher

== Farm system ==
Level	Team	League	Manager
AAA	Richmond Braves	International League	Jim Beauchamp
AA	Greenville Braves	Southern League	Buddy Bailey
A	Durham Bulls	Carolina League	Grady Little
A	Burlington Braves	Midwest League	Jim Saul
A	Sumter Braves	South Atlantic League	Ned Yost
Rookie	Pulaski Braves	Appalachian League	Randy Ingle
Rookie	GCL Braves	Gulf Coast League	Jim Procopio
Rookie	Idaho Falls Braves	Pioneer League	Steve Curry
