= 1990 Kansas City Royals season =

1990 Kansas City Royals
- League: American League
- Division: West
- Ballpark: Royals Stadium
- City: Kansas City, Missouri
- Record: 75–86 (.466)
- Divisional place: 6th
- Owners: Ewing Kauffman
- General managers: John Schuerholz
- Managers: John Wathan
- Television: WDAF-TV (Paul Splittorff, Denny Trease)
- Radio: WIBW (AM) (Denny Matthews, Fred White)

The 1990 Kansas City Royals season was the 22nd season for the franchise, their 18th at Kauffman Stadium and their 4th full season under the management of John Wathan. It involved the Royals finishing sixth in the American League West with a record of 75 wins and 86 losses.

== Offseason ==
Kansas City maintained their reputation as one of the American League West's top contenders throughout the late 1980s. The club posted a winning record in three of the last four seasons following their World Series championship season. The Royals finished the 1989 season with a 92–70 record (third best record in franchise history) and a second-place finish in the AL West seven games behind the season's World Series champion Oakland Athletics. Though the team boasted a powerhouse rotation in the AL Cy Young Award winner Bret Saberhagen (set franchise record with 23 wins in 1989), two time All-Star Mark Gubicza (15 game winner in 1989) and 1989 AL Rookie of the Year runner-up Tom Gordon (won 17 games in 1989), the organization felt they were still missing a few pieces that would give the Oakland Athletics a run for their money.

The Royals were left without a high-caliber closing pitcher when Dan Quisenberry, the team's All-Star ace closer for much of the 1980s, was dropped from the club in 1988. Mark Davis, last season's league leader in saves (44) and boasting a 1.85 earned run average with the San Diego Padres, became a free agent at the close of the 1989 season. Kansas City had their eye on the 1989 National League Cy Young winner and back-to-back All-Star (1988, 1989), and after several attempts to acquire Davis, the organization was ultimately successful in signing him to a four-year $13 million contract (the largest annual salary in baseball history at the time). Several days earlier, the Royals bulked up their rotation by inking starting pitcher Storm Davis, who was enjoying a career-high 19 game win record (3rd best in the league) with the Athletics in 1989, on a three-year $6 million contract. With a solid pitching rotation, which was now ranked among the best in the league, the team traded away starting pitcher Charlie Leibrandt and prospect Rick Luecken to the Atlanta Braves for 1988 All-Star first baseman Gerald Perry as an added offensive threat. The Royals filled in their fifth starting pitching slot by signing yet another free agent with veteran right-hander Richard Dotson. Kansas City concluded a milestone off-season as its biggest commitment to free agents in the club's entire history.

=== Transactions ===
- December 5, 1989: Richard Dotson was signed as a free agent by the Royals.
- December 7, 1989: Storm Davis was signed as a free agent by the Royals.
- December 7, 1989: Willie Wilson was signed as a free agent by the Royals.
- December 11, 1989: Mark Davis was signed as a free agent by the Royals.
- December 15, 1989: Charlie Leibrandt and Rick Luecken were traded by the Royals to the Atlanta Braves in exchange for Gerald Perry and Jim LeMasters (minors).

== Regular season ==
Despite the promising off-season moves, the team suffered critical bullpen injuries while the newly signed Davis hurlers both experienced lackluster performances throughout the season. The Royals concluded the 1990 campaign with a 75-86 finish and second-to-last place standing in the AL West (worst franchise record since 1970). Though the team would bounce back with winning records during the next several years, the disastrous season would symbolically come to mark the beginning of the end of Kansas City's relevance in professional baseball.

- George Brett became a three decade batting champ by winning the 1990 American League batting title.
- July 11, 1990: In a game against the Baltimore Orioles, Bo Jackson performed his famous "wall run", when he caught a ball approximately 2-3 strides away from the wall. As he caught the ball at full tilt, Jackson looked up and noticed the wall and began to run up the wall, one leg reaching higher as he ascended. He ran along the wall almost parallel to the ground, and came down with the catch, to avoid impact and the risk of injury from the fence.
- July 17, 1990: In a game against the New York Yankees, Bo Jackson would have an outstanding performance where he blasts three home runs in his first three at bats, putting up seven RBI's, just before he exits the game with a shoulder injury.
- July 25, 1990: George Brett hit for the cycle (reverse) for the second time in his career against the Toronto Blue Jays.
- August 31, 1990: Ken Griffey Sr. and Ken Griffey Jr. of the Seattle Mariners made history by being the first father and son to play in a game together. This historic game was played against the Royals.

=== Opening Day Roster ===
- Bob Boone
- George Brett
- Jim Eisenreich
- Bo Jackson
- Gerald Perry
- Bret Saberhagen
- Kevin Seitzer
- Kurt Stillwell
- Danny Tartabull
- Frank White

=== Season standings ===
AL West
Team	W	L	Pct.	GB	Home	Road
Oakland Athletics	103	59	.636	—	51‍–‍30	52‍–‍29
Chicago White Sox	94	68	.580	9	49‍–‍31	45‍–‍37
Texas Rangers	83	79	.512	20	47‍–‍35	36‍–‍44
California Angels	80	82	.494	23	42‍–‍39	38‍–‍43
Seattle Mariners	77	85	.475	26	38‍–‍43	39‍–‍42
Kansas City Royals	75	86	.466	27½	45‍–‍36	30‍–‍50
Minnesota Twins	74	88	.457	29	41‍–‍40	33‍–‍48

=== Record vs. opponents ===
1990 American League record Sources:
Team	BAL	BOS	CAL	CWS	CLE	DET	KC	MIL	MIN	NYY	OAK	SEA	TEX	TOR
Baltimore	—	4–9	7–5	6–6	6–7	6–7	8–3	7–6	6–6	6–7	4–8	3–9	8–4	5–8
Boston	9–4	—	7–5	6–6	9–4	8–5	4–8	5–8	4–8	9–4	4–8	8–4	5–7	10–3
California	5–7	5–7	—	5–8	7–5	5–7	7–6	7–5	9–4	6–6	4–9	5–8	8–5	7–5
Chicago	6–6	6–6	8–5	—	5–7	5–7	9–4	10–2	7–6	10–2	8–5	8–5	7–6	5–7
Cleveland	7–6	4–9	5–7	7–5	—	5–8	6–6	9–4	7–5	5–8	4–8	7–5	7–5	4–9
Detroit	7–6	5–8	7–5	7–5	8–5	—	5–7	3–10	6–6	7–6	6–6	7–5	6–6	5–8
Kansas City	3–8	8–4	6–7	4–9	6–6	7–5	—	4–8	8–5	8–4	4–9	7–6	5–8	5–7
Milwaukee	6–7	8–5	5–7	2–10	4–9	10–3	8–4	—	4–8	6–7	5–7	4–8	5–7	7–6
Minnesota	6–6	8–4	4–9	6–7	5–7	6–6	5–8	8–4	—	6–6	6–7	6–7	5–8	3–9
New York	7–6	4–9	6–6	2–10	8–5	6–7	4–8	7–6	6–6	—	0–12	9–3	3–9	5–8
Oakland	8–4	8–4	9–4	5–8	8–4	6–6	9–4	7–5	7–6	12–0	—	9–4	8–5	7–5
Seattle	9–3	4–8	8–5	5–8	5–7	5–7	6–7	8–4	7–6	3–9	4–9	—	7–6	6–6
Texas	4–8	7–5	5–8	6–7	5–7	6–6	8–5	7–5	8–5	9–3	5–8	6–7	—	7–5
Toronto	8–5	3–10	5–7	7–5	9–4	8–5	7–5	6–7	9–3	8–5	5–7	6–6	5–7	—

=== Notable transactions ===
- March 31, 1990: José DeJesús was traded by the Royals to the Philadelphia Phillies for Steve Jeltz.
- March 31, 1990: Mark Lee was released by the Royals.
- June 21, 1990: Richard Dotson was released by the Royals.
- August 30, 1990: Pat Tabler was traded by the Royals to the New York Mets for Archie Corbin.

=== Roster ===
1990 Kansas City Royals
Roster
Pitchers: 55 Kevin Appier; 27 Luis Aquino; 37 Jay Baller; 57 Jim Campbell; 34 Chris Codiroli; 49 Steve Crawford; 48 Mark Davis; 14 Storm Davis; 37 Richard Dotson; 54 Luis Encarnación; 26 Steve Farr; 35 Pete Filson; 36 Tom Gordon; 23 Mark Gubicza; 59 Carlos Maldonado; 38 Andy McGaffigan; 34 Larry McWilliams; 21 Jeff Montgomery; 18 Bret Saberhagen; 31 Israel Sánchez; 40 Daryl Smith; 52 Mel Stottlemyre Jr.; 58 Héctor Wagner	Catchers: 8 Bob Boone; 15 Mike Macfarlane; 49 Brent Mayne; 29 Rey Palacios; Infielders: 47 Sean Berry; 5 George Brett; 19 Jeff Conine; 2 Steve Jeltz; 32 Bill Pecota; 17 Gerald Perry; 33 Kevin Seitzer; 50 Terry Shumpert; 1 Kurt Stillwell; 20 Frank White	Outfielders: 22 Jim Eisenreich; 16 Bo Jackson; 56 Brian McRae; 45 Russ Morman; 24 Jeff Schulz; 30 Pat Tabler; 4 Danny Tartabull; 25 Gary Thurman; 6 Willie Wilson	Manager: 12 John Wathan; Coaches: 44 Glenn Ezell (bullpen); 43 Frank Funk (pitching); 41 Adrian Garrett (third base); 7 John Mayberry; 42 Bob Schaefer (first base)

== Player stats ==
= Indicates team leader

= Indicates league leader

=== Batting ===
==== Starters by position ====
Note: Pos = Position; G = Games played; AB = At bats; H = Hits; Avg. = Batting average; HR = Home runs; RBI = Runs batted in

Pos	Player	G	AB	H	Avg.	HR	RBI
C	Mike Macfarlane	124	400	102	.255	6	58
1B	George Brett	142	544	179	.329	14	87
2B	Frank White	82	241	52	.216	2	21
3B	Kevin Seitzer	158	622	171	.275	6	38
SS	Kurt Stillwell	144	506	126	.249	3	51
LF	Jim Eisenreich	142	496	139	.280	5	51
CF	Bo Jackson	111	405	110	.272	28	78
RF	Danny Tartabull	88	313	84	.268	15	60
DH	Gerald Perry	133	465	118	.254	8	57

==== Other batters ====
Note: G = Games pitched; AB = At bats; H = Hits; Avg. = Batting average; HR = Home runs; RBI = Runs batted in

Player	G	AB	H	Avg.	HR	RBI
Willie Wilson	115	307	89	.290	2	42
Bill Pecota	87	240	58	.242	5	20
Pat Tabler	75	195	53	.272	1	19
Brian McRae	46	168	48	.286	2	23
Bob Boone	40	117	28	.239	0	9
Steve Jeltz	74	103	16	.155	0	10
Terry Shumpert	32	91	25	.275	0	8
Jeff Schulz	30	66	17	.258	0	6
Gary Thurman	23	60	14	.233	0	3
Rey Palacios	41	56	13	.232	2	9
Russ Morman	12	37	10	.270	1	3
Sean Berry	8	23	5	.217	0	4
Jeff Conine	9	20	5	.250	0	2
Brent Mayne	5	13	3	.231	0	1

=== Pitching ===
==== Starting pitchers ====
Note: G = Games pitched; IP = Innings pitched; W = Wins; L = Losses; ERA = Earned run average; SO = Strikeouts

Player	G	IP	W	L	ERA	SO
Tom Gordon	32	195.1	12	11	3.73	175
Kevin Appier	32	185.2	12	8	2.76	127
Bret Saberhagen	20	135.0	5	9	3.27	87
Storm Davis	21	112.0	7	10	4.74	62
Mark Gubicza	16	94.0	4	7	4.50	71
Héctor Wagner	5	23.1	0	2	8.10	14
Jim Campbell	2	9.2	1	0	8.38	2

==== Other pitchers ====
Note: G = Games pitched; IP = Innings pitched; W = Wins; L = Losses; ERA = Earned run average; SO = Strikeouts

Player	G	IP	W	L	ERA	SO
Steve Farr	57	127.0	13	7	1.98	94
Andy McGaffigan	24	78.2	4	3	3.09	49
Luis Aquino	20	68.1	4	1	3.16	28
Pete Filson	8	35.0	0	4	5.91	9
Mel Stottlemyre Jr.	13	31.1	0	1	4.88	14
Richard Dotson	8	28.2	0	4	8.48	9
Chris Codiroli	6	10.1	0	1	9.58	8
Daryl Smith	2	6.2	0	1	4.05	6

==== Relief pitchers ====
Note: G = Games pitched; W = Wins; L = Losses; SV = Saves; ERA = Earned run average; SO = Strikeouts

Player	G	W	L	SV	ERA	SO
Jeff Montgomery	73	6	5	24	2.39	94
Mark Davis	53	2	7	6	5.11	73
Steve Crawford	46	5	4	1	4.16	54
Larry McWilliams	13	0	0	0	9.72	7
Israel Sánchez	11	0	0	0	8.38	5
Luis Encarnación	4	0	0	0	7.84	8
Carlos Maldonado	4	0	0	0	9.00	9
Jay Baller	3	0	1	0	15.43	1

== Awards and honors ==
- George Brett – American League Batting Champion (.329)

All-Star Game

== Farm system ==
Level	Team	League	Manager
AAA	Omaha Royals	American Association	Sal Rende
AA	Memphis Chicks	Southern League	Jeff Cox
A	Baseball City Royals	Florida State League	Brian Poldberg
A	Appleton Foxes	Midwest League	Joe Breeden
A-Short Season	Eugene Emeralds	Northwest League	P. K. Kirsch
Rookie	GCL Royals	Gulf Coast League	Carlos Tosca

LEAGUE CHAMPIONS: Omaha, Memphis
