= 1989 Atlanta Braves season =

1989 Atlanta Braves
- League: National League
- Division: West
- Ballpark: Atlanta–Fulton County Stadium
- City: Atlanta
- Record: 63–97 (.394)
- Divisional place: 6th
- Owners: Ted Turner
- General managers: Bobby Cox
- Managers: Russ Nixon
- Television: WTBS; Superstation WTBS
- Radio: WSB (Ernie Johnson, Pete Van Wieren, Skip Caray, Don Sutton)

The 1989 Atlanta Braves season was the 119th in franchise history and their 24th in Atlanta.

== Offseason ==
- December 23, 1988: Darrell Evans was signed as a free agent by the Braves.
- March 29, 1989: Mark Eichhorn was purchased by the Atlanta Braves from the Toronto Blue Jays.

== Regular season ==
=== Season standings ===
NL West
| Team | W | L | Pct. | GB | Home | Road |
|---|---|---|---|---|---|---|
| San Francisco Giants | 92 | 70 | .568 | — | 53‍–‍28 | 39‍–‍42 |
| San Diego Padres | 89 | 73 | .549 | 3 | 46‍–‍35 | 43‍–‍38 |
| Houston Astros | 86 | 76 | .531 | 6 | 47‍–‍35 | 39‍–‍41 |
| Los Angeles Dodgers | 77 | 83 | .481 | 14 | 44‍–‍37 | 33‍–‍46 |
| Cincinnati Reds | 75 | 87 | .463 | 17 | 38‍–‍43 | 37‍–‍44 |
| Atlanta Braves | 63 | 97 | .394 | 28 | 33‍–‍46 | 30‍–‍51 |

=== Record vs. opponents ===
1989 National League record Sources:
| Team | ATL | CHC | CIN | HOU | LAD | MON | NYM | PHI | PIT | SD | SF | STL |
|---|---|---|---|---|---|---|---|---|---|---|---|---|
| Atlanta | — | 5–7 | 8–10 | 8–10 | 6–10 | 6–6 | 2–10 | 8–4 | 4–8 | 7–11 | 6–12 | 3–9 |
| Chicago | 7–5 | — | 7–5 | 5–7 | 7–5 | 10–8 | 10–8 | 10–8 | 12–6 | 8–4 | 6–6 | 11–7 |
| Cincinnati | 10–8 | 5–7 | — | 8–10 | 8–10 | 4–8 | 4–8 | 4–8 | 7–5 | 9–9 | 8–10 | 8–4 |
| Houston | 10–8 | 7–5 | 10–8 | — | 10–8 | 4–8 | 6–6 | 9–3 | 7–5 | 8–10 | 8–10 | 7–5 |
| Los Angeles | 10–6 | 5–7 | 10–8 | 8–10 | — | 7–5 | 5–7 | 6–6 | 7–5 | 6–12 | 10–8 | 3–9 |
| Montreal | 6–6 | 8–10 | 8–4 | 8–4 | 5–7 | — | 9–9 | 9–9 | 11–7 | 5–7 | 7–5 | 5–13 |
| New York | 10–2 | 8–10 | 8–4 | 6–6 | 7–5 | 9–9 | — | 12–6 | 9–9 | 5–7 | 3–9 | 10–8 |
| Philadelphia | 4–8 | 8–10 | 8–4 | 3–9 | 6–6 | 9–9 | 6–12 | — | 10–8 | 2–10 | 4–8 | 7–11 |
| Pittsburgh | 8–4 | 6–12 | 5–7 | 5–7 | 5–7 | 7–11 | 9–9 | 8–10 | — | 3–9 | 5–7 | 13–5 |
| San Diego | 11–7 | 4–8 | 9–9 | 10–8 | 12–6 | 7–5 | 7–5 | 10–2 | 9–3 | — | 8–10 | 2–10 |
| San Francisco | 12–6 | 6–6 | 10–8 | 10–8 | 8–10 | 5–7 | 9–3 | 8–4 | 7–5 | 10–8 | — | 7–5 |
| St. Louis | 9–3 | 7–11 | 4–8 | 5–7 | 9–3 | 13–5 | 8–10 | 11–7 | 5–13 | 10–2 | 5–7 | — |

=== Opening Day starters ===
- Gerónimo Berroa
- Jeff Blauser
- Jody Davis
- Ron Gant
- Tom Glavine
- Dale Murphy
- Gerald Perry
- Lonnie Smith
- Andrés Thomas

=== Notable transactions ===
- July 2, 1989: Zane Smith was traded by the Braves to the Montreal Expos for Sergio Valdez, Nate Minchey, and Kevin Dean (minors).
- August 12, 1989: Ed Romero was signed as a free agent by the Braves.
- August 23, 1989: Ed Romero was traded by the Braves to the Milwaukee Brewers for a player to be named later. The Brewers completed the deal by sending Jay Aldrich to the Braves on September 1.
- August 24, 1989: Jim Acker was traded by the Braves to the Toronto Blue Jays for Tony Castillo and Francisco Cabrera.
- August 24, 1989: Paul Assenmacher was traded by the Braves to the Chicago Cubs for players to be named later. The Cubs completed the deal by sending Kelly Mann and Pat Gomez to the Braves on September 1.

=== Roster ===
1989 Atlanta Braves
Roster
| Pitchers: 38 Jim Acker; 43 Jay Aldrich; 40 Jose Alvarez; 30 Paul Assenmacher; 37 Joe Boever; 36 Tony Castillo; 48 Marty Clary; 32 Gary Eave; 49 Mark Eichhorn; 47 Tom Glavine; 33 Tommy Greene; 46 Dwayne Henry; 24 Derek Lilliquist; 50 Kent Mercker; 45 Charlie Puleo; 52 Rusty Richards; 25 Pete Smith; 34 Zane Smith; 29 John Smoltz; 30 Mike Stanton; 34 Sergio Valdez | Catchers: 20 Bruce Benedict; 7 Jody Davis; 38 Kelly Mann; 8 John Mizerock; 6 John Russell; Infielders: 4,32 Jeff Blauser; 10 Francisco Cabrera; 31 Drew Denson; 11 Darrell Evans; 5 Ron Gant; 17 Mark Lemke; 28 Gerald Perry; 19 Ed Romero; 14 Andrés Thomas; 15 Jeff Treadway; 10 Ed Whited | Outfielders: 22 Gerónimo Berroa; 19 Terry Blocker; 16 Tommy Gregg; 10 Dion James; 23 David Justice; 1 Oddibe McDowell; 3 Dale Murphy; 27 Lonnie Smith; 12 Jeff Wetherby | Manager: 2 Russ Nixon; Coaches: 39 Bruce Dal Canton; 54 Clarence Jones; 11 Roy Majtyka; 55 Brian Snitker; 7 Bobby Wine |

== Player stats ==
=== Batting ===
==== Starters by position ====
Note: Pos = Position; G = Games played; AB = At bats; H = Hits; Avg. = Batting average; HR = Home runs; RBI = Runs batted in

| Pos | Player | G | AB | H | Avg. | HR | RBI |
|---|---|---|---|---|---|---|---|
| C | Jody Davis | 78 | 231 | 39 | .169 | 4 | 19 |
| 1B | Gerald Perry | 72 | 266 | 67 | .252 | 4 | 21 |
| 2B | Jeff Treadway | 134 | 473 | 131 | .277 | 8 | 40 |
| 3B | Jeff Blauser | 142 | 456 | 123 | .270 | 12 | 46 |
| SS | Andrés Thomas | 141 | 554 | 118 | .213 | 13 | 57 |
| LF | Lonnie Smith | 134 | 482 | 152 | .315 | 21 | 79 |
| CF | Dale Murphy | 154 | 574 | 131 | .228 | 20 | 84 |
| RF | Tommy Gregg | 102 | 276 | 67 | .243 | 6 | 23 |

==== Other batters ====
Note: G = Games played; AB = At bats; H = Hits; Avg. = Batting average; HR = Home runs; RBI = Runs batted in

| Player | G | AB | H | Avg. | HR | RBI |
|---|---|---|---|---|---|---|
| Oddibe McDowell | 76 | 280 | 85 | .304 | 7 | 24 |
| Darrell Evans | 107 | 276 | 57 | .207 | 11 | 39 |
| Ron Gant | 75 | 260 | 46 | .177 | 9 | 25 |
| Dion James | 63 | 170 | 44 | .259 | 1 | 11 |
| Bruce Benedict | 66 | 160 | 31 | .194 | 1 | 6 |
| John Russell | 74 | 159 | 29 | .182 | 2 | 9 |
| Gerónimo Berroa | 81 | 136 | 36 | .265 | 2 | 9 |
| Ed Whited | 36 | 74 | 12 | .162 | 1 | 4 |
| Mark Lemke | 14 | 55 | 10 | .182 | 2 | 10 |
| David Justice | 16 | 51 | 12 | .235 | 1 | 3 |
| Jeff Wetherby | 52 | 48 | 10 | .208 | 1 | 7 |
| Drew Denson | 12 | 36 | 9 | .250 | 0 | 5 |
| Terry Blocker | 26 | 31 | 7 | .226 | 0 | 1 |
| John Mizerock | 11 | 27 | 6 | .222 | 0 | 2 |
| Kelly Mann | 7 | 24 | 5 | .208 | 0 | 1 |
| Ed Romero | 7 | 19 | 5 | .263 | 1 | 1 |
| Francisco Cabrera | 4 | 14 | 3 | .214 | 0 | 0 |

=== Pitching ===
==== Starting pitchers ====
Note: G = Games pitched; IP = Innings pitched; W = Wins; L = Losses; ERA = Earned run average; SO = Strikeouts

| Player | G | IP | W | L | ERA | SO |
|---|---|---|---|---|---|---|
| John Smoltz | 29 | 208.0 | 12 | 11 | 2.94 | 168 |
| Tom Glavine | 29 | 186.0 | 14 | 8 | 3.68 | 90 |
| Derek Lilliquist | 32 | 165.2 | 8 | 10 | 3.97 | 79 |
| Pete Smith | 28 | 142.0 | 5 | 14 | 4.75 | 115 |
| Marty Clary | 18 | 108.2 | 4 | 3 | 3.15 | 30 |
| Zane Smith | 17 | 99.0 | 1 | 12 | 4.45 | 58 |
| Tommy Greene | 4 | 26.1 | 1 | 2 | 4.10 | 17 |
| Gary Eave | 3 | 20.2 | 2 | 0 | 1.31 | 9 |
| Rusty Richards | 2 | 9.1 | 0 | 0 | 4.82 | 4 |

==== Other pitchers ====
Note: G = Games pitched; IP = Innings pitched; W = Wins; L = Losses' ERA = Earned run average; SO = Strikeouts

| Player | G | IP | W | L | ERA | SO |
|---|---|---|---|---|---|---|
| Kent Mercker | 2 | 4.1 | 0 | 0 | 12.46 | 4 |

==== Relief pitchers ====
Note: G = Games pitched; W = Wins; L = Losses; SV = Saves; ERA = Earned run average; SO = Strikeouts

| Player | G | W | L | SV | ERA | SO |
|---|---|---|---|---|---|---|
| Joe Boever | 66 | 4 | 11 | 21 | 3.94 | 68 |
| Jim Acker | 59 | 0 | 6 | 2 | 2.67 | 68 |
| Paul Assenmacher | 49 | 1 | 3 | 0 | 3.59 | 64 |
| Mark Eichhorn | 45 | 5 | 5 | 0 | 4.35 | 49 |
| Jose Alvarez | 30 | 3 | 3 | 2 | 2.86 | 45 |
| Mike Stanton | 20 | 0 | 1 | 7 | 1.50 | 27 |
| Sergio Valdez | 19 | 1 | 2 | 0 | 6.06 | 26 |
| Charlie Puleo | 15 | 1 | 1 | 0 | 4.66 | 17 |
| Dwayne Henry | 12 | 0 | 2 | 1 | 4.26 | 16 |
| Tony Castillo | 12 | 0 | 1 | 0 | 4.82 | 5 |
| Jay Aldrich | 8 | 1 | 2 | 0 | 2.19 | 7 |
| Terry Blocker | 1 | 0 | 0 | 0 | 0.00 | 0 |
| John Russell | 1 | 0 | 0 | 0 | 0.00 | 0 |

== Award winners ==
1989 Major League Baseball All-Star Game

- John Smoltz, pitcher, reserve

== Farm system ==
| Level | Team | League | Manager |
|---|---|---|---|
| AAA | Richmond Braves | International League | Jim Beauchamp |
| AA | Greenville Braves | Southern League | Buddy Bailey |
| A | Durham Bulls | Carolina League | Grady Little |
| A | Burlington Braves | Midwest League | Jim Saul |
| A | Sumter Braves | South Atlantic League | Ned Yost |
| Rookie | Pulaski Braves | Appalachian League | Fred Koenig |
| Rookie | GCL Braves | Gulf Coast League | Jim Procopio |
| Rookie | Idaho Falls Braves | Pioneer League | Cloyd Boyer |

LEAGUE CHAMPIONS: Richmond
