= Carlos Maldonado =

Carlos Maldonado may refer to:

- Carlos Maldonado (catcher) (born 1979), Venezuelan baseball catcher in the Washington Nationals organization
- Carlos Maldonado (footballer) (born 1963), Venezuelan football (soccer) player
- Carlos Maldonado (pitcher) (born 1966), Panamanian baseball pitcher
- Carlos Maldonado Curti (born 1963), Chilean politician
