= Derek Lilliquist =

American baseball player (born 1966)

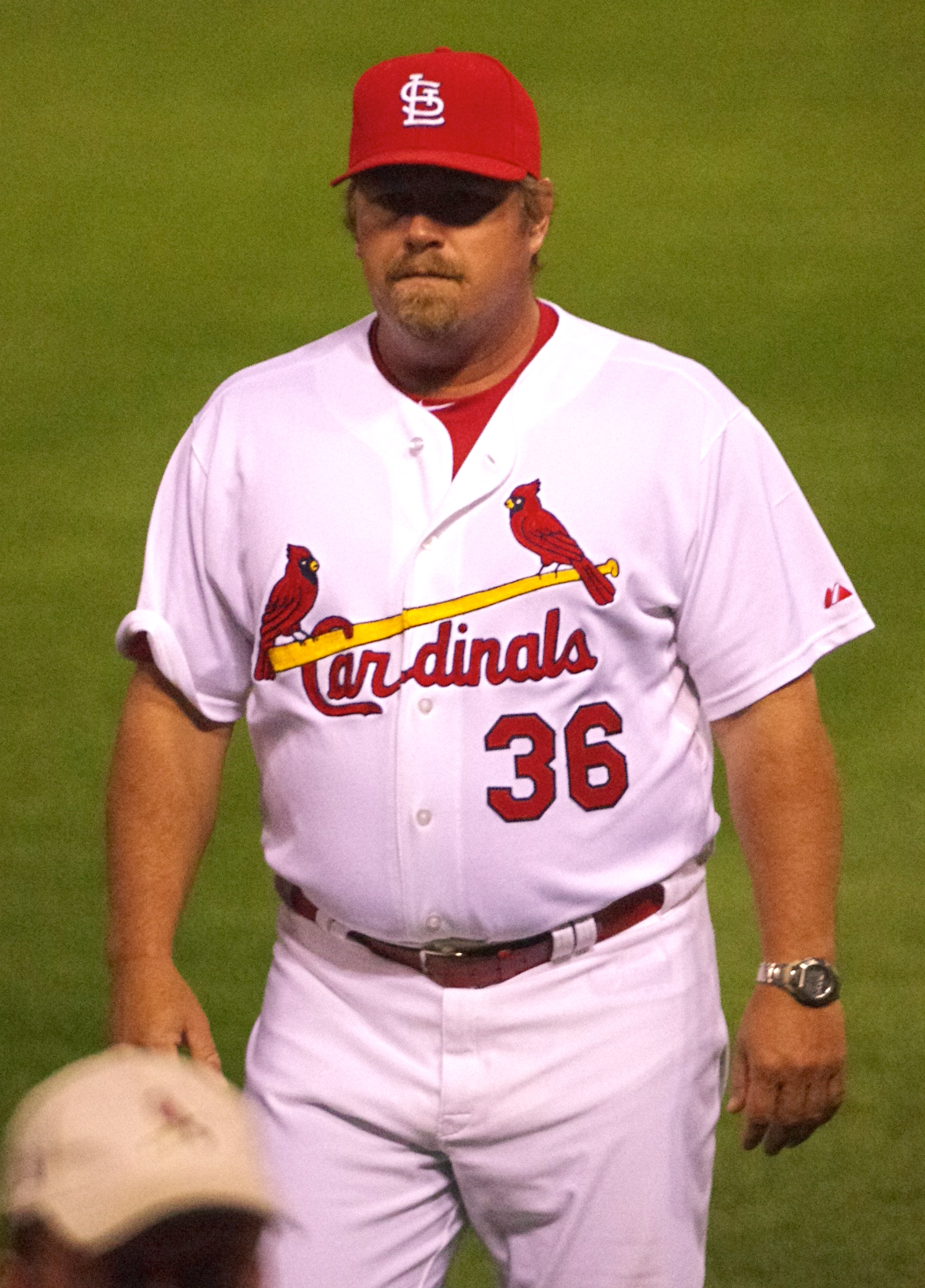
- Lilliquist with St. Louis Cardinals
- Pitcher
- Born: February 20, 1966 (age 60); Winter Park, Florida, U.S.
- Batted: Left Threw: Left

MLB debut
- April 13, 1989, for the Atlanta Braves

Last MLB appearance
- September 6, 1996, for the Cincinnati Reds

MLB statistics
- Win–loss record: 25–34
- Earned run average: 4.13
- Strikeouts: 261
- Stats at Baseball Reference

Teams
- As player: Atlanta Braves (1989–1990); San Diego Padres (1990–1991); Cleveland Indians (1992–1994); Boston Red Sox (1995); Cincinnati Reds (1996); As coach: St. Louis Cardinals (2011–2017); Washington Nationals (2018–2019)

Career highlights and awards
- World Series champion (2011)

Derek Jansen Lilliquist (born February 20, 1966) is an American former Major League Baseball (MLB) pitcher and pitching coach. He played for the Atlanta Braves (1989–1990), San Diego Padres (1990–1991), Cleveland Indians (1992–1994), Boston Red Sox (1995) and Cincinnati Reds (1996), and has coached for the St. Louis Cardinals and Washington Nationals.

While playing for the University of Georgia (UGA), Lilliquist was selected as Baseball America's Pitcher of the Year and was an All-American in 1987. In the major leagues, he functioned primarily as a relief pitcher. With Cleveland in 1992, he posted career lows in earned run average (2.25), hits per nine innings (5.7), and walks plus hits per inning pitched (0.924) while appearing in a career-high 71 games.

== Amateur career ==
Derek Lilliquist graduated from Sarasota High School in Sarasota, Florida, in 1984. He played college baseball for the Georgia Bulldogs. In 1986 and 1987, he played collegiate summer baseball with the Cotuit Kettleers of the Cape Cod Baseball League. In 1987, Lilliquist was an All-American selection according to both the American Baseball Coaches Association and Baseball America (BA). He was also BA's Pitcher of the Year for that season. He helped lead to UGA to their first-ever Southeastern Conference title and trip to the College World Series. In three seasons at UGA, Lilliquist posted a 31–12 won–loss record and 3.30 earned run average (ERA).

== Professional career ==
=== Atlanta Braves ===
The Atlanta Braves selected Lilliquist as the sixth overall pick in the 1987 Major League Baseball draft and assigned him to the Gulf Coast League Braves in the Rookie League of Minor League Baseball that same season. There he made two starts, totaling 13 innings pitched (IP), allowing just three hits and no runs. He was promoted to the Durham Bulls of the Carolina League, where he made three starts, totaling 25 IP, two complete games and a 2.88 ERA. The next season, the Braves again promoted him, this time to the AAA Richmond Braves of the International League, where he spent the entire season. Lilliquist started all 28 games in which he appeared, posting a 3.38 ERA in a professional-high 170 2/3 IP. While striking out just 80 batters, he also allowed just 36 bases on balls (BB).

Facing the San Diego Padres at Jack Murphy Stadium in San Diego in his MLB debut on April 13, 1989, Lilliquist pitched the Braves to a 4–1 victory. In 7 1/3 IP, he allowed just the run on three hits while earning the win. For the season, he pitched his MLB career-high 165 2/3 innings and allowed a 3.97 ERA. However, he also allowed 202 hits for an average of 11.0 hits per nine innings pitched (H/9). He finished second in the National League (NL) in bases on balls per 9 innings pitched (BB/9) with 1.847 and fourth in the NL Rookie of the Year voting.

On May 1, 1990, at Atlanta in Atlanta–Fulton County Stadium, Lilliquist became one of the few pitchers to have a multi-homer game when he hit two home runs off Ron Darling in a Braves' 5–2 victory over the New York Mets. His batting statistics for the Braves that season included eight hits in 23 at bats for a .348 batting average, two home runs and three runs batted in with a .609 slugging percentage. However, his pitching had declined since his rookie year.

=== San Diego Padres ===
With a 6.28 ERA and two wins and eight losses in 11 starts, the Braves traded Lilliquist to the San Diego Padres for Mark Grant on July 12, 1990. Lilliquist's only career MLB complete game and shutout occurred on August 12, 1990, in a 9–0 defeat of the Houston Astros. He allowed four hits while striking out three. With the Padres that season, he fared better, posting a 4.33 ERA.

Spending most of the 1991 season in the minor leagues, the Padres assigned Lilliquist to the Las Vegas Stars of the Pacific Coast League. Here, he allowed 142 hits in 105 IP and 33 games for 5.38 ERA, contributing as both a starter and reliever. With the Padres, he allowed 14 earned runs in 14 1/3 IP for an 8.79 ERA.

=== Cleveland Indians ===
The Cleveland Indians claimed Lilliquist off waivers from the Padres on November 22, 1991. He converted to full-time relief duty in 1992. Here, he posted some of his career-best numbers, including ERA, H/9, and walks plus hits per inning pitched (WHIP). In 71 games, he pitched 61 2/3 innings, allowed just 39 hits for 5.7 H/9, 0.924 WHIP and a 2.25 ERA. His 71 appearances placed fourth in the American League (AL) among pitchers. He also finished 22 games and saved six.

Continuing on his success in 1993, Lilliquist appeared in 56 games, posting a 2.25 ERA, 1.297 WHIP while saving ten games and finishing 28. His final year in Cleveland saw his ERA rise to 4.91 in 1994.

=== Boston Red Sox ===
He signed as a free agent with the Boston Red Sox before the 1995 season, but could not replicate his success in Cleveland. He appeared in 28 games while posting a 6.26 ERA. The Red Sox released him in July, making him a free agent.

=== Los Angeles Dodgers and Cincinnati Reds ===
The Los Angeles Dodgers signed Lilliquist on August 1, 1995, and assigned him to their AAA minor league affiliate, the Albuquerque Dukes. They never called him up to the major leagues. He again became a free agent following the season and signed with the Cincinnati Reds for the 1996 season. The Reds assigned him to their AAA minor league affiliate, the Indianapolis Indians, where he appeared in 47 games – all as a reliever – and posted a 2.60 ERA. The Reds called Lilliquist up to the major leagues, where he appeared in five games. His last MLB game was on September 6, 1996, against the San Francisco Giants, where he faced one batter and gave up a hit.

== Coaching career ==
=== High school ===
After retiring as a player, Lilliquist coached for Vero Beach High School in Vero Beach, Florida, from 1998 to 2001.

=== St. Louis Cardinals ===
Lilliquist next coached in the St. Louis Cardinals organization. In 2002, he served as the pitching coach for the Johnson City Cardinals of the Rookie League, where his pitching staff posted a 5.04 ERA and 7.8 strikeouts per 9 innings pitched (K/9) in 67 games. The next season, he handled the same role for the Class A Peoria Chiefs. This team posted a 3.48 ERA and 5.8 K/9 in 138 games.

Lilliquist spent the next four seasons as the pitching coach for the Class A Palm Beach Cardinals of the Florida State League (FSL) in Jupiter, Florida. His clubs twice made the playoffs. Palm Beach won the 2005 FSL Championship as the pitching staff registered the league's second-best ERA at 3.94. He then contributed as the Cardinals' pitching coordinator from 2008–10, helping to rehabilitate injured pitchers at the club's spring training complex in Jupiter.

The Cardinals named Lilliquist as the Cardinals major league bullpen coach on November 2, 2010. Late in the Cardinals' 2011 World Series–championship season, he temporarily replaced incumbent pitching coach Dave Duncan, who took a leave of absence for family reasons. On January 6, 2012, the Cardinals announced that Lilliquist would permanently replace Duncan, whose future remained uncertain. On October 3, 2017, the Cardinals announced that Lilliquist would not return to the team for the 2018 season.

=== Washington Nationals ===
The Washington Nationals named Lilliquist as their major league pitching coach on November 9, 2017. On May 2, 2019, the Nationals announced that they had fired Lilliquist immediately after the conclusion of that evening's game and had replaced him with Nationals minor league pitching coordinator Paul Menhart.

== Personal life ==
During the offseason, Lilliquist resides in Vero Beach, Florida. He has two children, Derek and Alexandra.

== See also ==
- List of St. Louis Cardinals coaches

Sporting positions
Preceded by unknown	Johnson City Cardinals pitching coach 2002	Succeeded by Al Holland
Preceded by Gary Buckels	Peoria Chiefs pitching coach 2003	Succeeded by Bryan Eversgerd
Preceded by unknown	Palm Beach Cardinals pitching coach 2004-2007	Succeeded by Dennis Martinez
Preceded by Marty Mason	St. Louis Cardinals bullpen coach 2011	Succeeded by Dyar Miller
Preceded by Dave Duncan	St. Louis Cardinals pitching coach 2012-2017	Succeeded by Mike Maddux
Preceded by Mike Maddux	Washington Nationals pitching coach 2018-2019	Succeeded by Paul Menhart
