= Jim Campbell (pitcher) =

American baseball player (born 1966)

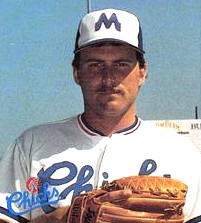
- Campbell in 1988
- Pitcher
- Born: May 19, 1966 (age 60); Santa Maria, California, U.S.
- Batted: Left Threw: Left

MLB debut
- August 21, 1990, for the Kansas City Royals

Last MLB appearance
- August 26, 1990, for the Kansas City Royals

MLB statistics
- Win–loss record: 1–0
- Earned run average: 8.38
- Strikeouts: 2
- Stats at Baseball Reference

Teams
- Kansas City Royals (1990)

James Marcus Campbell (born May 19, 1966) is an American former Major League Baseball pitcher who played for just portions of two games in one season.

Campbell played for the Kansas City Royals for two partial games during the 1990 Kansas City Royals season. Earlier, he played college baseball at San Diego State University.
