= Anthony Telford =

American baseball player (born 1966)

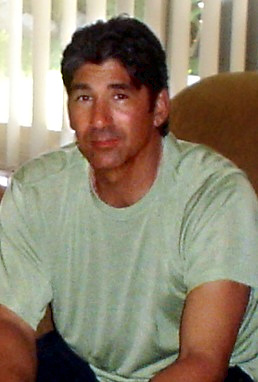
- Telford in 2008
- Pitcher
- Born: March 6, 1966 (age 60); San Jose, California, U.S.
- Batted: Right Threw: Right

MLB debut
- August 19, 1990, for the Baltimore Orioles

Last MLB appearance
- July 15, 2002, for the Texas Rangers

MLB statistics
- Win–loss record: 22–25
- Earned run average: 4.17
- Strikeouts: 331
- Stats at Baseball Reference

Teams
- Baltimore Orioles (1990–1991, 1993); Montreal Expos (1997–2001); Texas Rangers (2002)

Anthony Charles Telford (born March 6, 1966) is an American former professional baseball pitcher who currently works for the Pittsburgh Pirates of Major League Baseball (MLB). As a player, the Baltimore Orioles selected him in the third round of the 1987 MLB draft from San Jose State, where he was named an All-American. He spent nine total seasons pitching mainly in relief for the Orioles, Montreal Expos, and Texas Rangers.

== Professional career ==
=== Playing career ===
The Orioles selected Telford in the third round of the 1987 Major League Baseball draft from San Jose State, where he had been named an All-American. (He also played collegiate summer baseball with the Anchorage Bucs in 1986 and 1987.) In his major league debut on August 19, 1990, he was credited as the winning pitcher in the Orioles' 3–2 victory over the Oakland Athletics. In seven innings as the game's starting pitcher, Telford allowed just one hit with no earned runs.

Telford spent the bulk of his career as a middle relief pitcher with the Montreal Expos from 1997 to 2001. In his first four seasons with the Expos, he posted earned run averages of 3.24, 3.86, 3.96 and 3.79 while pitching between 78 1/3 and 96 innings each season.

He played his last game in the majors with the Texas Rangers in 2002.

=== Post-playing career ===
In 2007, Telford was the pitching coach for the Aiken Foxhounds in the independent South Coast League. In January 2010, the Pittsburgh Pirates hired Telford into their newly created position of Personal Development Coordinator. In 2013 and 2014, Telford played in charity baseball games with other retired players.
