= Steve Shields (baseball) =

American baseball player (born 1958)

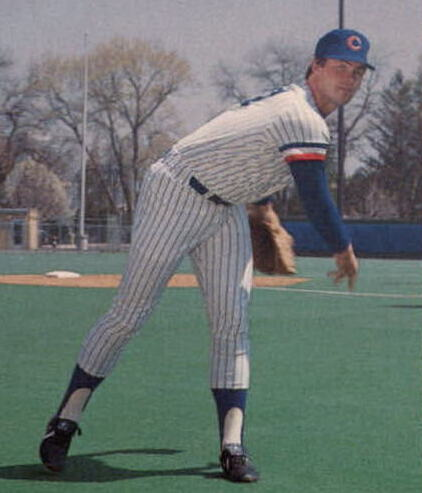
- Shields with the Columbus Clippers c. 1988
- Pitcher
- Born: November 30, 1958 (age 67); Gadsden, Alabama, U.S.
- Batted: Right Threw: Right

MLB debut
- June 1, 1985, for the Atlanta Braves

Last MLB appearance
- June 19, 1989, for the Minnesota Twins

MLB statistics
- Win–loss record: 8–8
- Earned run average: 5.26
- Strikeouts: 126
- Stats at Baseball Reference

Teams
- Atlanta Braves (1985–1986); Kansas City Royals (1986); Seattle Mariners (1987); New York Yankees (1988); Minnesota Twins (1989)

Stephen Mack Shields (born November 30, 1958) is an American former professional baseball relief pitcher. He played in Major League Baseball (MLB) for five teams from 1985 to 1989.

Shields attended Hokes Bluff High School in Hokes Bluff, Alabama, helping the baseball team win the 5 state championships. He was drafted by the Boston Red Sox in the 10th round of the 1977 MLB draft. In 1982, he tied for the Eastern League lead with 13 complete games. He reached free agency after the 1983 season and signed with the Atlanta Braves.

Shields made his MLB debut with Atlanta in June 1985. He started six times in his rookie season, working exclusively as a reliever in the majors thereafter. Atlanta traded him to the Kansas City Royals for Darryl Motley on September 23, 1986. After pitching in three games for the Royals, he was traded again after the season, going to the Seattle Mariners with Scott Bankhead and Mike Kingery for Danny Tartabull and Rick Luecken.

Shields was on Seattle's 1987 Opening Day roster. On April 11, he was hit in the face by a line drive from Kirby Puckett, which required surgery and sent him to the disabled list. Shields pitched in 20 games for the Mariners, earning his only three MLB saves. He became a free agent after the season and signed with the New York Yankees. He split the 1988 season between New York and Triple-A Columbus. The Yankees traded him to the Minnesota Twins in March 1989 for Balvino Gálvez. In his final MLB season, Shields pitched in 11 games.

In 219 innings pitched over five MLB seasons, Shields posted an 8–8 win–loss record, a 5.26 earned run average, and 126 strikeouts.

== Personal life ==
Shields is married and has two children.

Shields played football and basketball in high school and was a High School All-American basketball player.

After his playing career, Shields became the pitching coach at Hokes Bluff in 2000, helping the baseball team win six consecutive state championships from 2003 to 2008.
