= Héctor Wagner =

Dominican baseball player (1968-2017)

Hector Wagner
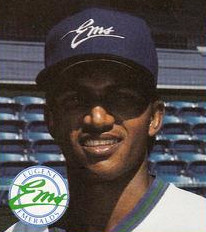
- Wagner in 1988
- Pitcher
- Born: November 26, 1968; San Juan de la Maguana, Dominican Republic
- Died: June 5, 2017 (aged 48); Clifton, New Jersey, U.S.
- Batted: Right Threw: Right

MLB debut
- September 10, 1990, for the Kansas City Royals

Last MLB appearance
- June 24, 1991, for the Kansas City Royals

MLB statistics
- Win–loss record: 1–3
- Earned run average: 7.83
- Strikeouts: 14

CPBL statistics
- Win–loss record: 8–6
- Earned run average: 3.71
- Strikeouts: 82
- Stats at Baseball Reference

Teams
- Kansas City Royals (1990–1991); Uni-President Lions (1994); Chinatrust Brothers (1997)

Héctor Raul Guerrero Wagner (November 26, 1968 – June 5, 2017) was a Dominican professional baseball pitcher for the Kansas City Royals of Major League Baseball (MLB) from 1990 to 1991.

== Early life ==
Wagner was born in 1968 in San Juan de la Maguana in the Dominican Republic.

== Career ==
Wagner originally signed with the Kansas City Royals as an amateur free agent on May 13, 1986. He began his professional career the following year, 1987, as a member of the Royals' rookie minor league team, the GCL Royals. He pitched in 13 games that season, starting 12 of them, and had a win–loss record of 1–3 and an earned run average (ERA) of 3.06. The following season, Wagner was promoted to the Eugene Emeralds of the Northwest League. He pitched a no-hitter through seven innings in a match against the Spokane Indians on August 14 in a 5-1 victory. He finished the season having pitched 15 games for the Emeralds, going 4-9 with a 3.68 ERA.

The Royals invited Wagner to spring training to start the 1989 season, and although he did not make the final roster, the team noted that he had a shot to make the roster later that season. He spent the season with the Appleton Foxes of the Midwest League, where he pitched in 24 games, won 6 and lost 11, and finished the season with an ERA of 4.56.

Wagner spent the 1990 season with the Memphis Chicks, the Royals' Double-A minor league affiliate. In 40 games, primarily as a relief pitcher, he had a 12-4 record, a 2.02 ERA, and over 133 innings pitched. In September, the Royals brought him to the major league roster, and he made his major league debut on September 10, 1990 against the Toronto Blue Jays. Wagner pitched in five games for the Royals in 1990, losing two and finishing the season with an ERA of 8.10. He was the eighth youngest player in Major League Baseball that season.

As the 1991 season began, Wagner was on the 40-man roster, and after participating in spring training with the team, he started the season with the Omaha Royals, the Royals' Triple-A minor league affiliate. In late May, Royals' pitcher Mark Davis was placed on the disabled list, and Wagner was called up to the major league roster in his place. He made two starts for the Royals that season, winning one and losing one, and finishing with an ERA of 7.20. After the two appearances, he was sent back to Omaha, where he finished the season with a 5-6 record and a 3.44 ERA. In 1992, he was to pitch for the Royals, but needed rotator cuff surgery and ended up missing the season.

After recovering from the surgery, Wagner split his time in 1993 between the Memphis Chicks and the Wilmington Blue Rocks of the Royals minor league system. He pitched in ten games for Memphis, winning two and losing four, and he started 13 games with Wilmington, finishing the season with a 1-7 record and a 3.38 ERA. At the end of the season, the Royals released him, which ended his professional career for some time. He attempted a comeback in 1999 and 2001, playing for the Newark Bears in the independent Atlantic League. He pitched in 20 combined games those two seasons, then pitched in four games for the Pennsylvania Road Warriors the following year, his last season in the minor leagues.

== Death ==
In 2013, Wagner was diagnosed with stomach cancer. On June 5, 2017, he died from the disease at the age of 48 years old in Clifton, New Jersey.
