= Atwater, Minnesota =

City in Minnesota, United States

Atwater
- City
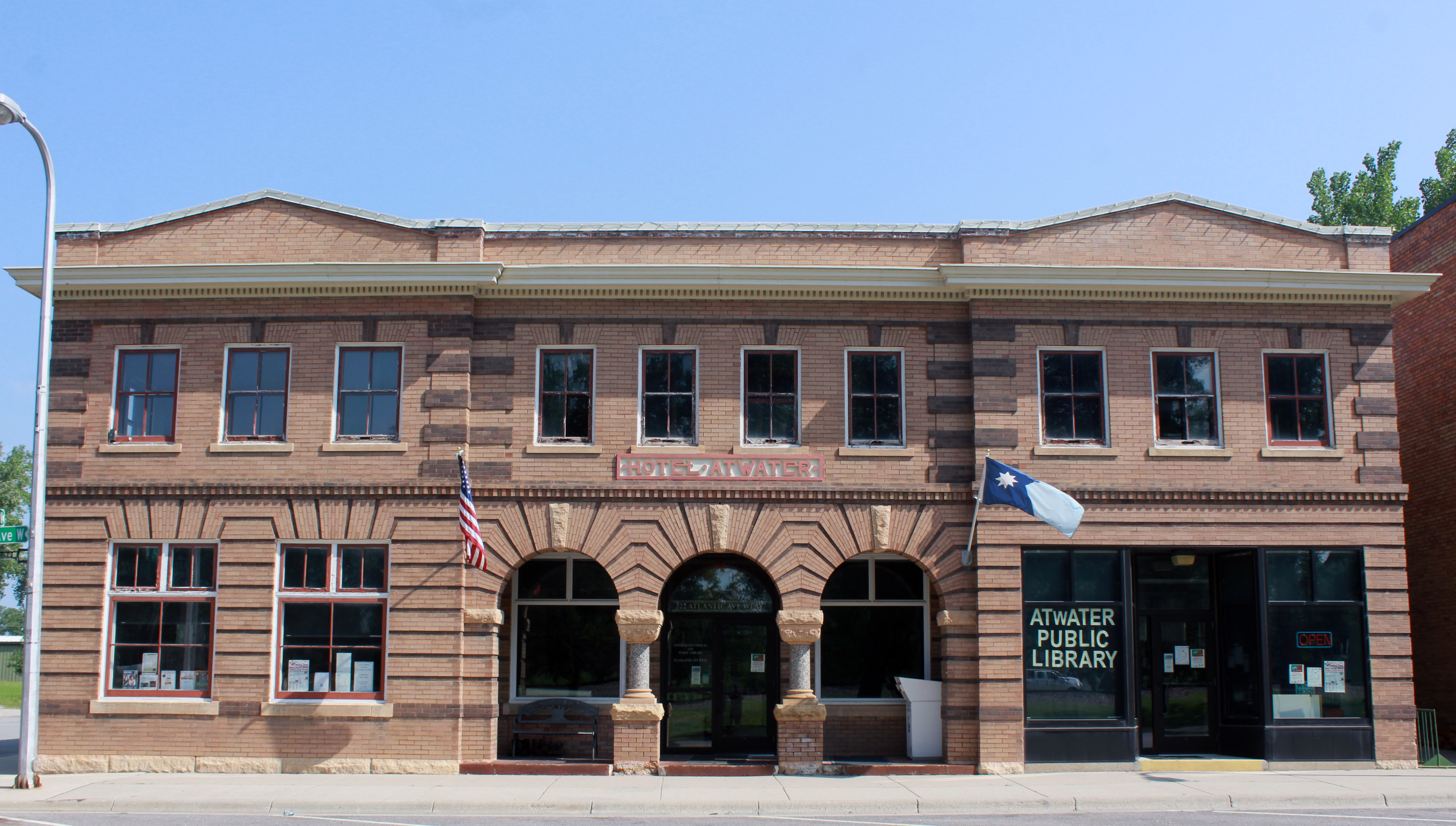
- Atwater City Hall and Public Library, built as a hotel in 1904

- Location of Atwater, Minnesota
- Coordinates: 45°08′08″N 94°46′37″W
- Country: United States
- State: Minnesota
- County: Kandiyohi
- Founded: 1869
- Incorporated: February 17, 1876

Area
  - Total: 1.08 sq mi (2.80 km^{2})
  - Land: 1.03 sq mi (2.67 km^{2})
  - Water: 0.050 sq mi (0.13 km^{2})
- Elevation: 1,214 ft (370 m)

Population (2020)
  - Total: 1,124
  - Estimate (2021): 1,114
  - Density: 1,090.8/sq mi (421.15/km^{2})
- Time zone: UTC-6 (Central)
  - Summer (DST): UTC-5 (CDT)
- ZIP code: 56209
- Area code: 320
- FIPS code: 27-02692
- GNIS feature ID: 2394020
- Website: atwatermn.gov

Atwater (/ˈætwɑːtər/ AT-wah-tər) is a city in Kandiyohi County, Minnesota, United States. The population was 1,124 at the 2020 census.

== Geography ==
According to the United States Census Bureau, the city has a total area of 1.08 square miles (2.80 km^{2}), of which 1.03 square miles (2.67 km^{2}) is land and 0.05 square miles (0.13 km^{2}) is water.

U.S. Route 12 serves as a main route in the city.

== History ==
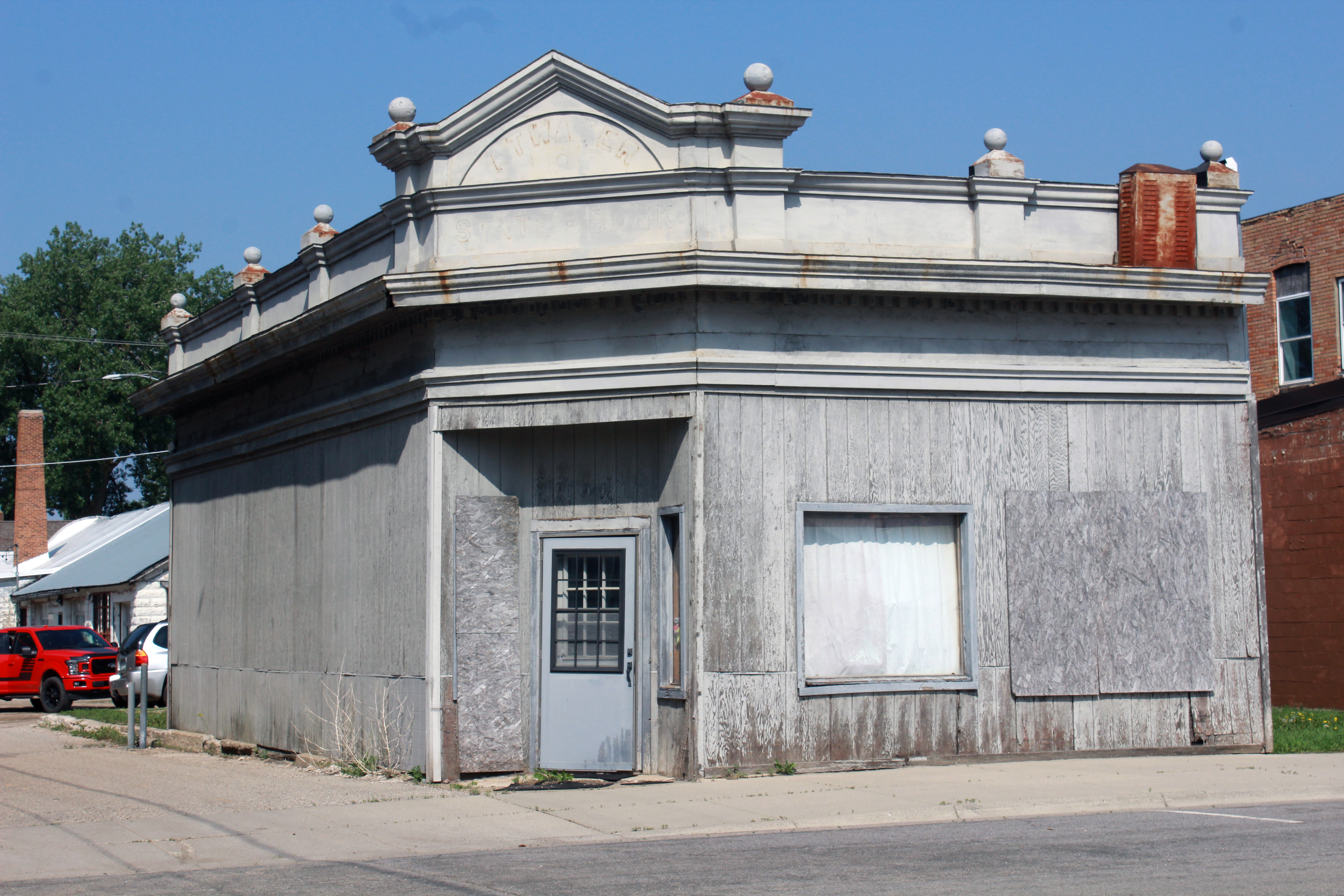
Former Atwater State Bank building, Atwater, Minnesota

Atwater was laid out in 1869, and incorporated on February 17, 1876. The city was named for E. D. Atwater, a railroad official. A post office has been in operation at Atwater since 1870.

== Education ==
Atwater is part of a consolidated school district with the cities of Cosmos and Grove City, which comprise the "ACGC" school district. Their mascot name is the Falcons. School colors are teal, black and silver. Currently, students in grades 5-12 attend classes in the neighboring town of Grove City. Younger students from Atwater attend ACGC North Elementary located approximately one-quarter mile from the downtown.

== Government ==
The town has a three-person police department.

== Demographics ==
Historical population
Census	Pop.	Note	%±
1880	302		—
1890	429		42.1%
1900	588		37.1%
1910	600		2.0%
1920	735		22.5%
1930	694		−5.6%
1940	815		17.4%
1950	880		8.0%
1960	899		2.2%
1970	956		6.3%
1980	1,128		18.0%
1990	1,053		−6.6%
2000	1,079		2.5%
2010	1,133		5.0%
2020	1,124		−0.8%
2021 (est.)	1,114		−0.9%
U.S. Decennial Census; 2020 Census

=== 2010 census ===
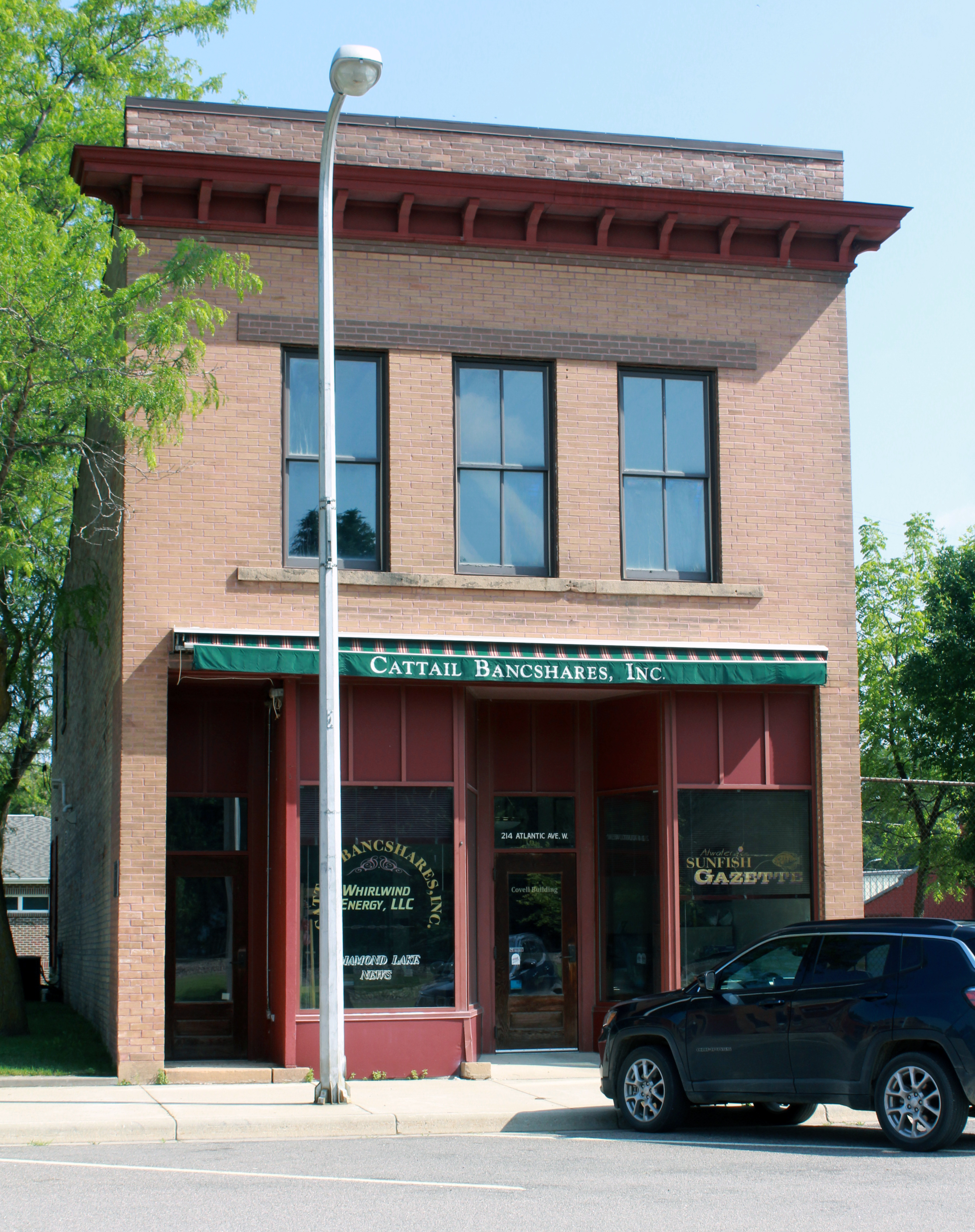
Commercial business

As of the census of 2010, there were 1,133 people, 468 households, and 312 families living in the city. The population density was 1,100.0 inhabitants per square mile (424.7/km^{2}). There were 494 housing units at an average density of 479.6 per square mile (185.2/km^{2}). The racial makeup of the city was 97.2% White, 0.1% African American, 0.1% Native American, 0.3% Asian, 2.0% from other races, and 0.4% from two or more races. Hispanic or Latino of any race were 4.0% of the population.

There were 468 households, of which 32.9% had children under the age of 18 living with them, 51.7% were married couples living together, 10.3% had a female householder with no husband present, 4.7% had a male householder with no wife present, and 33.3% were non-families. 29.1% of all households were made up of individuals, and 13.7% had someone living alone who was 65 years of age or older. The average household size was 2.37 and the average family size was 2.91.

The median age in the city was 37.7 years. 25.1% of residents were under the age of 18; 8.2% were between the ages of 18 and 24; 23.4% were from 25 to 44; 28.8% were from 45 to 64; and 14.7% were 65 years of age or older. The gender makeup of the city was 49.2% male and 50.8% female.

=== 2000 census ===
As of the census of 2000, there were 1,079 people, 461 households, and 296 families living in the city. The population density was 1,053.3 inhabitants per square mile (406.7/km^{2}). There were 475 housing units at an average density of 463.7 per square mile (179.0/km^{2}). The racial makeup of the city was 97.96% White, 0.09% African American, 0.09% Native American, 0.19% Asian, 0.09% Pacific Islander, 0.74% from other races, and 0.83% from two or more races. Hispanic or Latino of any race were 1.30% of the population.

There were 461 households, out of which 27.5% had children under the age of 18 living with them, 53.4% were married couples living together, 8.2% had a female householder with no husband present, and 35.6% were non-families. 32.3% of all households were made up of individuals, and 20.0% had someone living alone who was 65 years of age or older. The average household size was 2.31 and the average family size was 2.89.

In the city, the population was spread out, with 23.3% under the age of 18, 9.2% from 18 to 24, 25.1% from 25 to 44, 24.1% from 45 to 64, and 18.4% who were 65 years of age or older. The median age was 41 years. For every 100 females, there were 91.0 males. For every 100 females age 18 and over, there were 89.0 males.

The median income for a household in the city was $39,265, and the median income for a family was $48,289. Males had a median income of $30,365 versus $22,625 for females. The per capita income for the city was $21,112. About 4.1% of families and 5.5% of the population were below the poverty line, including 7.1% of those under age 18 and 4.0% of those age 65 or over.

== Notable people ==
- Mike Kingery, Professional baseball player

== Gallery ==
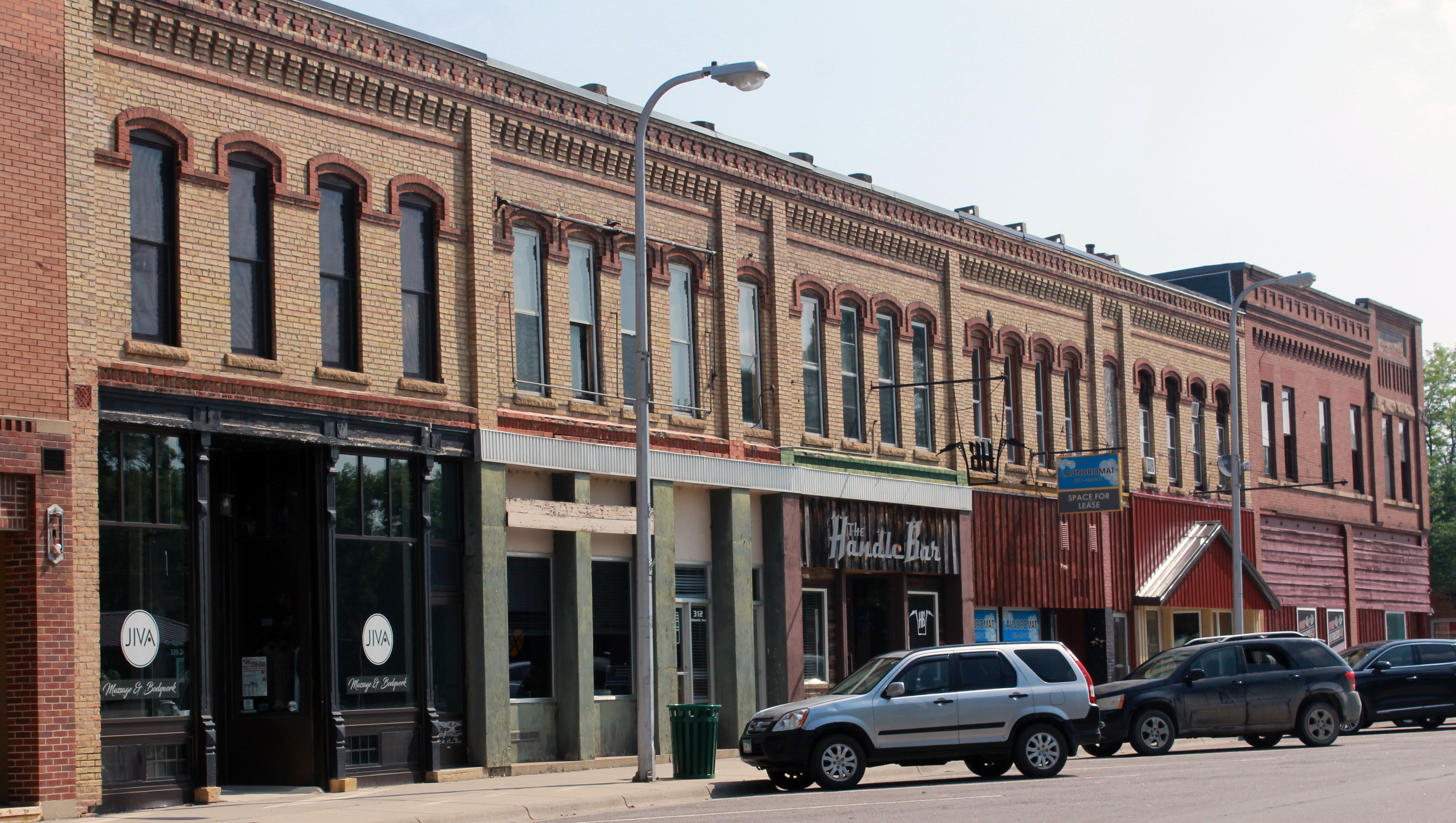
Commercial businesses on Atlantic Avenue

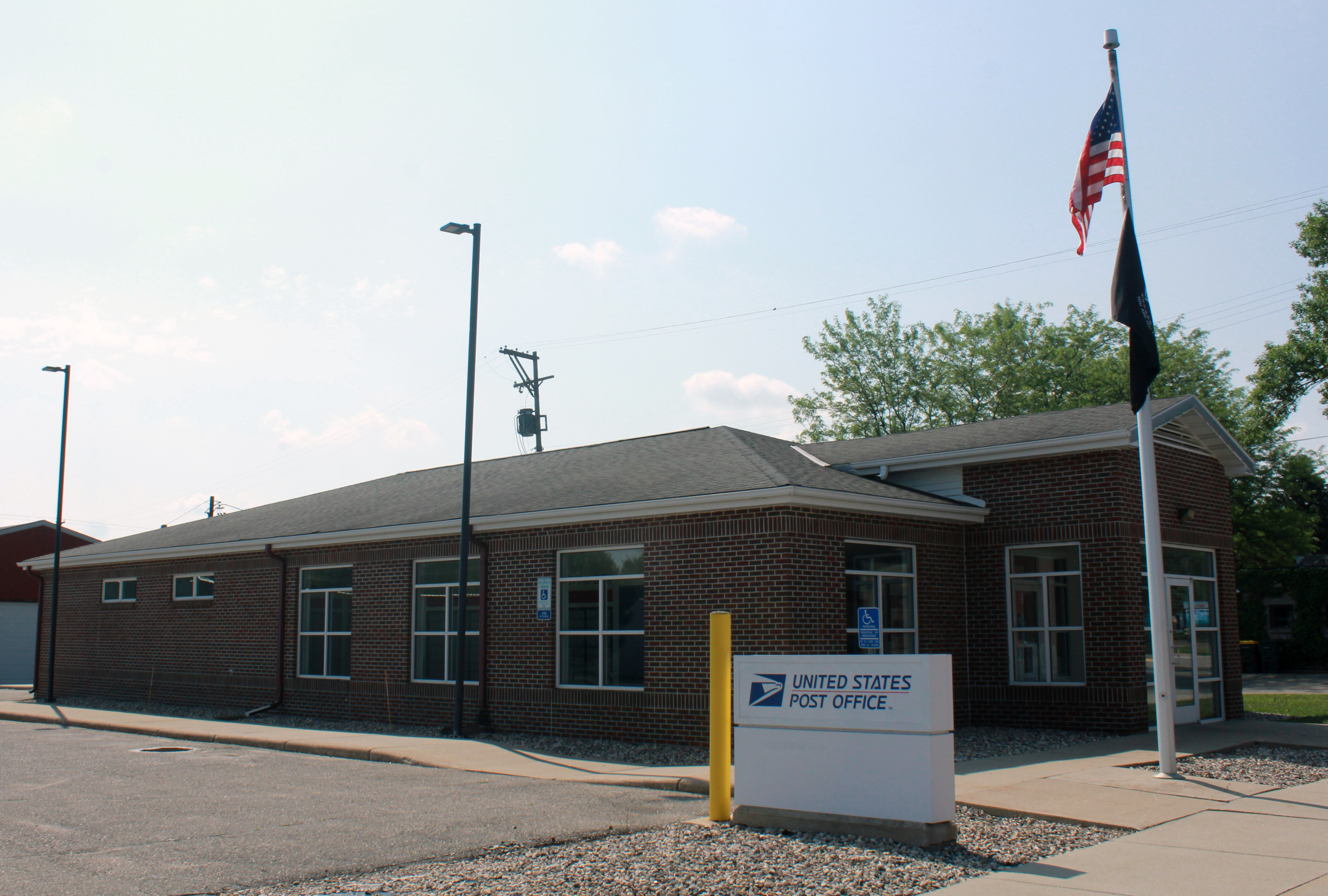
Post Office

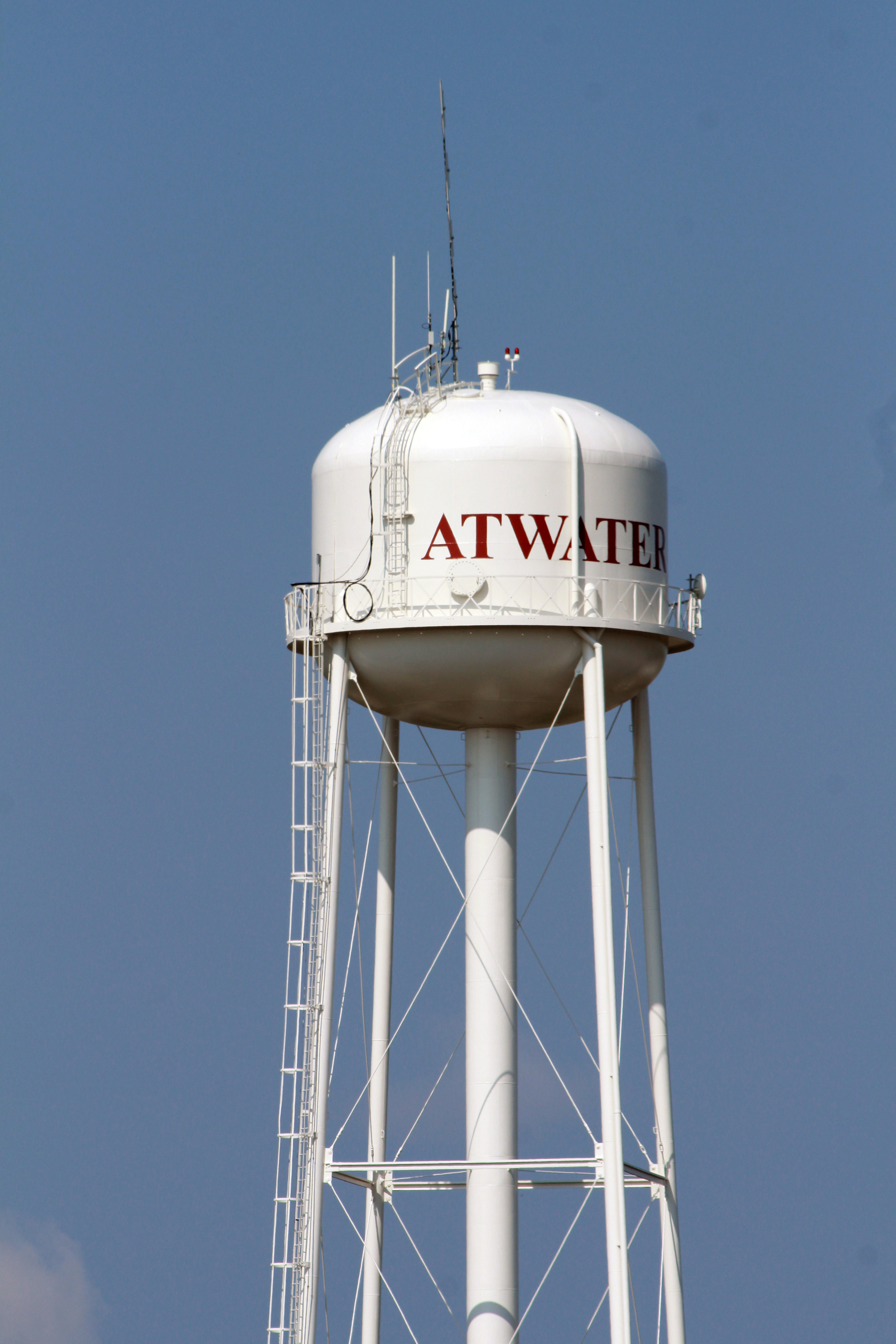
Water tower

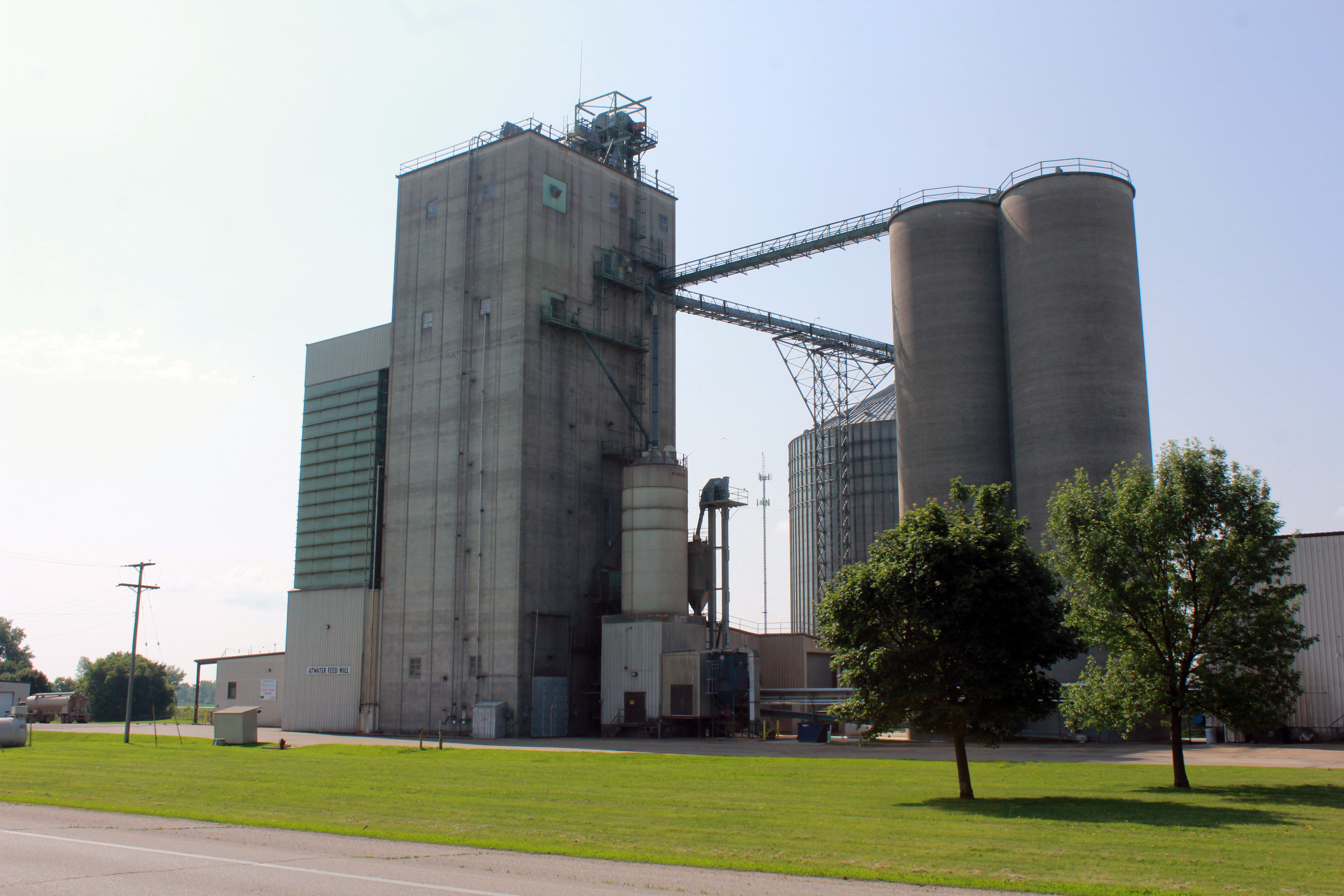
Atwater Feed Mill

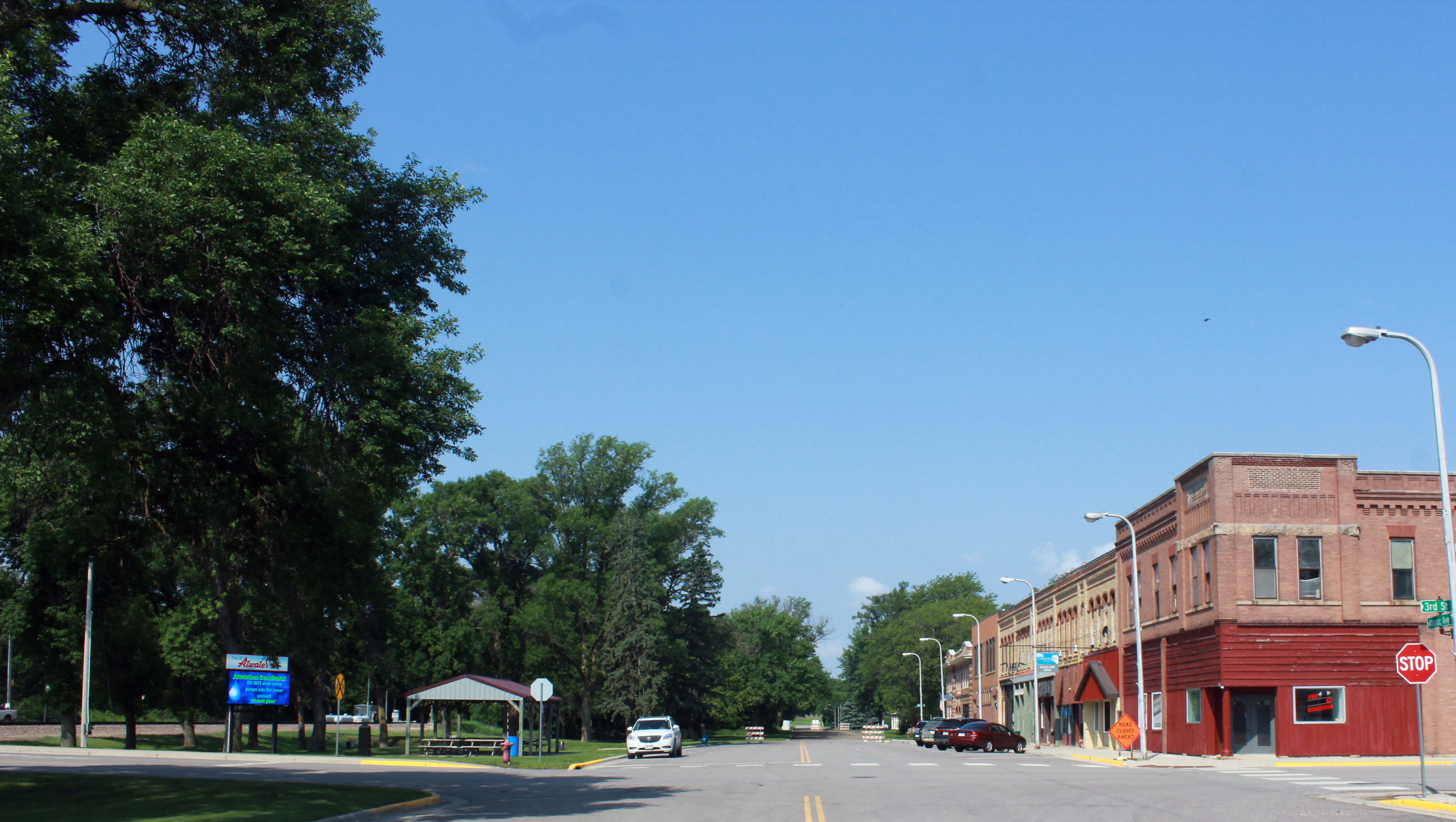
Commercial businesses and city park
