= Scott Bankhead =

American baseball player (born 1963)

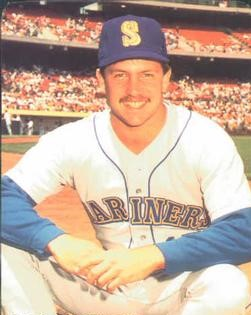
- Bankhead in 1987
- Pitcher
- Born: July 31, 1963 (age 63); Raleigh, North Carolina, U.S.
- Batted: Right Threw: Right

MLB debut
- May 25, 1986, for the Kansas City Royals

Last MLB appearance
- July 18, 1995, for the New York Yankees

MLB statistics
- Win–loss record: 57–48
- Earned run average: 4.18
- Strikeouts: 614
- Stats at Baseball Reference

Teams
- Kansas City Royals (1986); Seattle Mariners (1987–1991); Cincinnati Reds (1992); Boston Red Sox (1993–1994); New York Yankees (1995)
Medals
Representing United States
Men's baseball
Summer Olympics
Silver medal – second place	1984 Los Angeles	Team

Michael Scott Bankhead (born July 31, 1963) is an American former professional baseball pitcher who played in Major League Baseball (MLB) from 1986-1995. Bankhead also pitched for Team USA in the 1984 Olympic Games. He attended the University of North Carolina.

== Early life and education ==
Michael Scott Bankhead was born on July 31, 1963, in Raleigh, North Carolina. He graduated from Reidsville High School in Reidsville, North Carolina, and attended the University of North Carolina at Chapel Hill. In 1982 and 1983, he played collegiate summer baseball with the Wareham Gatemen of the Cape Cod Baseball League and was named a league all-star in both seasons.

== Professional career ==
=== Kansas City Royals ===
Bankhead was drafted by the Kansas City Royals in the first round, 16th pick, of the 1984 Major League Baseball draft.

He appeared in only 31 games in the minors before being called up by the Royals. He made his Major League debut on May 25, 1986, going four innings, giving up two hits and striking out four while giving up no earned runs to get his first win. He finished the '86 season going 8–9 with a 4.61 ERA in 24 games, 17 for starts.

=== Seattle Mariners ===
On December 10, 1986, he was traded by the Royals with Mike Kingery and Steve Shields to the Seattle Mariners for Rick Luecken and Danny Tartabull. In his first month with the Mariners, Bankhead went 4–1 with a 2.94 ERA, but he developed tendinitis and ended the season with a dismal 9–8 record and 5.42 ERA.

Bankhead established himself as a sharp pitcher in 1988, but it wasn't until 1989, when he went on a hot streak after the All-Star break, that he proved himself a winning pitcher. He finished the '89 season going 14–6 with a 3.34 ERA and was named co-MVP of the team along with Alvin Davis.

In his next two seasons shoulder trouble would limit Bankhead to just 21 appearances. On December 20, 1991, he was granted free agency.

=== Cincinnati Reds ===
On January 22, 1992, he signed as a free agent with the Cincinnati Reds. He would revive his career and in just one season he was 10–4 with a 2.93 ERA in 54 games. On April 24, 1992, Bankhead picked up his only MLB career save during a marathon 16 inning victory over the Padres. Bankhead pitched a scoreless 16th inning to close out a 7-6 Reds victory. On October 28, 1992, he was granted free agency.

=== Boston Red Sox ===
Bankhead was signed as a free agent with the Boston Red Sox on December 8, 1992. In two seasons, 1993 and 1994 with the Sox he went 5–3 with a 3.88 ERA in 67 games.

=== New York Yankees ===
On September 1, 1994, Bankhead was purchased by the New York Yankees from the Red Sox but never played for them that season because of the strike. He was granted free agency at the end of the season but re-signed with the Yankees. In 1995, Bankhead went 1–1 in 20 games, including one start. On July 25, he was released by the Yankees.

=== Oakland Athletics ===
On August 4, 1995, Bankhead signed as a free agent with the Oakland Athletics but never made an appearance for them at the Major League level. He was released by the A's on September 10.

== See also ==
- Baseball at the 1984 Summer Olympics
