= Luis Encarnación =

Dominican baseball player (born 1963)

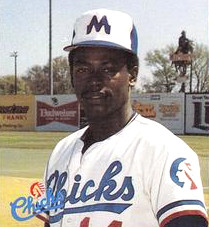
- Encarnación in 1988
- Pitcher
- Born: October 20, 1963 (age 62); Santo Domingo, Dominican Republic
- Batted: Right Threw: Right

MLB debut
- July 27, 1990, for the Kansas City Royals

Last MLB appearance
- August 11, 1990, for the Kansas City Royals

MLB statistics
- Win–loss record: 0–0
- Earned run average: 7.84
- Strikeouts: 8
- Stats at Baseball Reference

Teams
- Kansas City Royals (1990)

Luis Santos Encarnación (born October 20, 1963) is a Dominican former professional baseball pitcher who played for one season in Major League Baseball (MLB). He pitched in four games for the Kansas City Royals during the 1990 Kansas City Royals season.

== Early years ==
Encarnación was drafted in 1988 by the Kansas City Royals via the Rule 5 draft. He was originally signed by the Cleveland Indians and spent four years in their minor league system, including stops in Batavia, Waterloo, Waterbury, and Williamsport. After being acquired by Kansas City, he was assigned to their minor league affiliate in Memphis. He was called up to the major leagues in July 1990.
