= Rico Rossy =

Puerto Rican baseball player (born 1964)

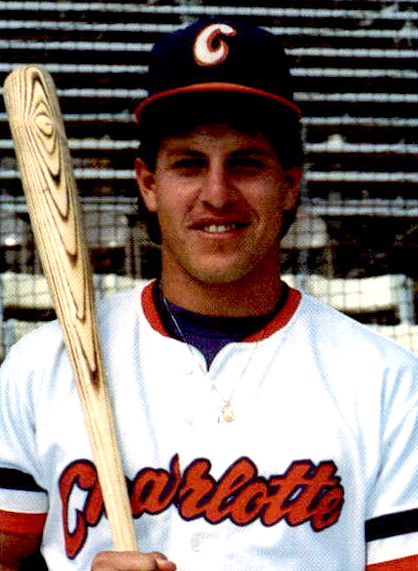
- Rossy with the Charlotte O's c. 1986
- Infielder
- Born: February 16, 1964 (age 61); San Juan, Puerto Rico
- Batted: Right Threw: Right

MLB debut
- September 11, 1991, for the Atlanta Braves

Last MLB appearance
- September 27, 1998, for the Seattle Mariners

MLB statistics
- Batting average: .211
- Home runs: 4
- Runs batted in: 28
- Stats at Baseball Reference

Teams
- Atlanta Braves (1991); Kansas City Royals (1992–1993); Seattle Mariners (1998)

Elam José "Rico" Rossy Ramos (born February 16, 1964) is an American former professional baseball player. He played all or parts of four seasons in Major League Baseball (MLB) as a utility infielder for the Atlanta Braves, Kansas City Royals, and the Seattle Mariners.

== Amateur career ==
Rossy attended Purdue University, where he played college baseball for the Boilermakers from 1982–1985.

== Professional career ==
Rossy was drafted by the Baltimore Orioles in the 33rd round of the 1985 MLB draft. He was traded along with minor-league shortstop Terry Crowley, Jr. from the Orioles to the Pittsburgh Pirates for Joe Orsulak on November 6, 1987. Then in 1990 he was traded again, this time to the Braves for Greg Tubbs. He debuted with the Braves on September 11, 1991. The next year, the Braves traded him to the Royals for Bobby Moore. He played with the Royals for two years, but never played in more than 60 games. For the next several years, Rossy bounced between organizations in the minors before resurfacing in the majors again with the Seattle Mariners in 1998. He played his last game in the majors on September 27, 1998.
