= Israel Sánchez =

Cuban baseball player (born 1963)

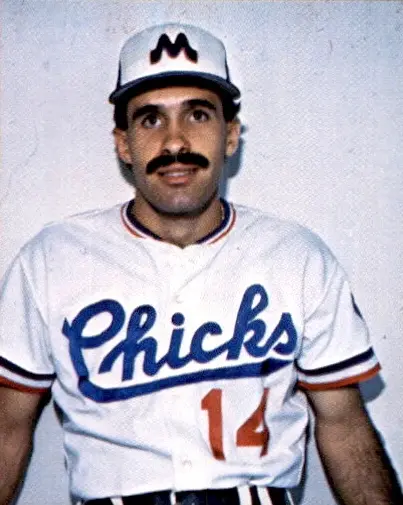
- Sánchez with the Memphis Chicks c. 1986
- Pitcher
- Born: August 20, 1963 (age 62); Falcon, Cuba
- Batted: Left Threw: Left

MLB debut
- July 7, 1988, for the Kansas City Royals

Last MLB appearance
- October 2, 1990, for the Kansas City Royals

MLB statistics
- Win–loss record: 3–2
- Earned run average: 5.36
- Strikeouts: 19
- Stats at Baseball Reference

Teams
- Kansas City Royals (1988, 1990)

Israel Sánchez Matos (born August 20, 1963) is a Cuban former Major League Baseball pitcher who played for two seasons. He pitched in 19 games for the Kansas City Royals during the 1988 Kansas City Royals season and 11 games during the 1990 Kansas City Royals season.
