= Mike Kingery =

American baseball player (born 1961)

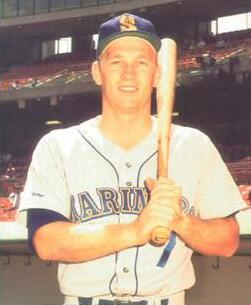
- Kingery with the Seattle Mariners c. 1987
- Outfielder
- Born: March 29, 1961 (age 65); St. James, Minnesota, U.S.
- Batted: Left Threw: Left

MLB debut
- July 7, 1986, for the Kansas City Royals

Last MLB appearance
- September 15, 1996, for the Pittsburgh Pirates

MLB statistics
- Batting average: .268
- Home runs: 30
- Runs batted in: 219
- Stats at Baseball Reference

Teams
- Kansas City Royals (1986); Seattle Mariners (1987–1989); San Francisco Giants (1990–1991); Oakland Athletics (1992); Colorado Rockies (1994–1995); Pittsburgh Pirates (1996)

Michael Scott Kingery (born March 29, 1961) is an American former professional baseball player who played in Major League Baseball, primarily as an outfielder, from 1986–1992 and 1994–1996.

Kingery signed as an undrafted free agent with the Kansas City Royals out of high school in 1980. As a rookie with the Royals in 1986, Kingery began his career with a nine-game hitting streak, but only hit .230 the rest of the season. On September 23, Kingery, a Minnesota native, had four hits against the Minnesota Twins on "Mike Kingery Day" at the Metrodome. That December, the Royals traded him along with Scott Bankhead and Steve Shields to the Seattle Mariners for Danny Tartabull and Rick Luecken.

Kingery hit a career-high 9 MLB home runs in 1987 while playing limited time with Seattle. With the Colorado Rockies in 1994, he ranked third in the National League in batting average and triples. Kingery finished his career with the Pittsburgh Pirates in 1996.

== Personal life ==
Kingery was a standout athlete and graduate of Atwater High School in Atwater, Minnesota.

Kingery currently lives in Willmar, Minnesota. Kingery's son was the Minnesota high school baseball Gatorade Player of the Year in 2021. Kingery is the namesake of Kingery Field in Atwater Kingery and his wife have eight children and eight grandchildren.
