= 1987 College Baseball All-America Team =

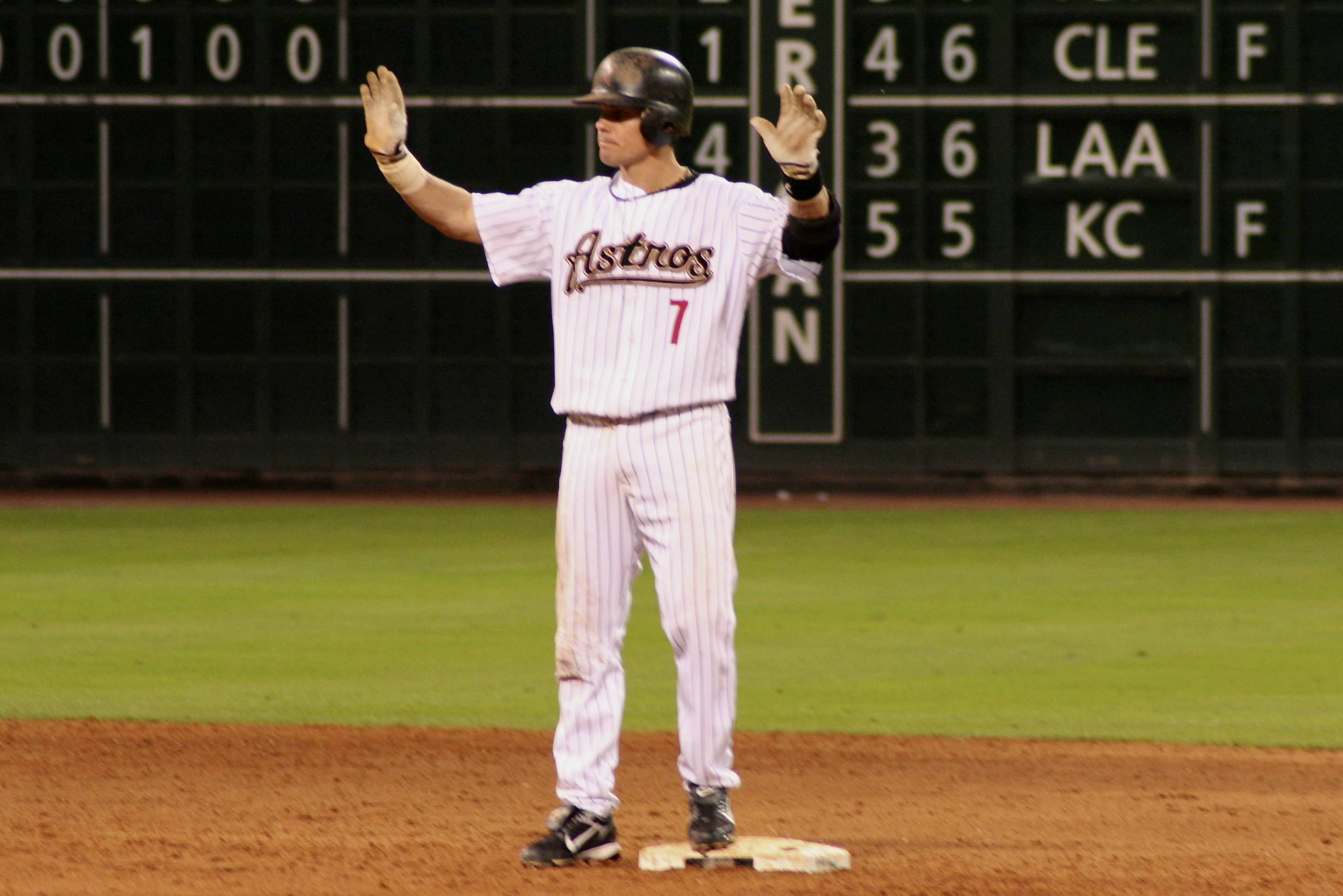
1987 All-Americans included seven-time MLB All-Star Craig Biggio.

This is a list of college baseball players named first team All-Americans for the 1987 NCAA Division I baseball season. From 1981 to 1990, there were three generally recognized All-America selectors for baseball: the American Baseball Coaches Association, Baseball America, and The Sporting News. In order to be considered a "consensus" All-American, a player must have been selected by at least two of these.

== Key ==
A	American Baseball Coaches Association
B	Baseball America
S	The Sporting News
	Member of the National College Baseball Hall of Fame
	Consensus All-American – selected by all three organizations
	Consensus All-American – selected by two organizations

== All-Americans ==
Position	Name	School	#	A	B	T	Other awards and honors
Pitcher	Curt Krippner	Texas	2	✓	✓	—	
Pitcher	Richie Lewis	Florida State	2	—	✓	✓	
Pitcher	Derek Lilliquist	Georgia	3	✓	✓	✓	Baseball America Pitcher of the Year
Pitcher	Gregg Olson	Auburn	1	—	✓	—	
Pitcher	Mike Remlinger	Dartmouth	1	✓	—	—	
Pitcher	Anthony Telford	San Jose State	1	—	✓	—	
Catcher	Craig Biggio	Seton Hall	2	—	✓	✓	
Catcher	Darrin Fletcher	Illinois	1	✓	—	—	
First baseman	Rodney Brewer	Florida	1	—	—	✓	
First baseman	Marteese Robinson	Seton Hall	2	✓	✓	—	Collegiate Baseball Player of the Year
Second baseman	Torey Lovullo	UCLA	3	✓	✓	✓	
Shortstop	Mike Benjamin	Arizona State	1	—	✓	—	
Shortstop	Dave Silvestri	Missouri	1	✓	—	—	
Shortstop	Bill Spiers	Clemson	1	—	—	✓	
Third baseman	Robin Ventura	Oklahoma State	3	✓	✓	✓	Baseball America Player of the Year Collegiate Baseball Player of the Year The Sporting News Player of the Year
Outfielder	Brian Cisarik	Texas	1	—	✓	—	
Outfielder	Kevin Garner	Texas	1	—	—	✓	
Outfielder	Riccardo Ingram	Georgia Tech	2	✓	✓	—	
Outfielder	Jay Knoblauh	Rice	1	—	—	✓	
Outfielder	Tim Raley	Wichita State	1	✓	—	—	
Outfielder	Ted Wood	New Orleans	2	✓	✓	—	
Outfielder	Bob Zupcic	Oral Roberts	1	—	—	✓	
Designated hitter	Jim Ifland	Oklahoma State	1	✓	—	—	
Designated hitter	Scott Livingstone	Texas A&M	2	—	✓	✓	
Utility player	Mike Willes	BYU	1	✓	—	—	

== See also ==
- List of college baseball awards
