= Rick Luecken =

American baseball player (born 1960)

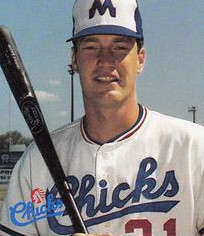
- Luecken in 1988
- Pitcher
- Born: November 15, 1960 (age 65); McAllen, Texas, U.S.
- Batted: Right Threw: Right

MLB debut
- June 6, 1989, for the Kansas City Royals

Last MLB appearance
- September 29, 1990, for the Toronto Blue Jays

MLB statistics
- Win–loss record: 3–5
- Earned run average: 5.10
- Strikeouts: 51
- Stats at Baseball Reference

Teams
- Kansas City Royals (1989); Atlanta Braves (1990); Toronto Blue Jays (1990)

Richard Fred Luecken (born November 15, 1960) is an American former professional baseball relief pitcher. He played in Major League Baseball (MLB) for the Kansas City Royals, Atlanta Braves and Toronto Blue Jays.

== Career ==
Luecken attended Texas A&M University, and in 1982 he played collegiate summer baseball with the Orleans Cardinals of the Cape Cod Baseball League.

He was selected by the Seattle Mariners in the 27th round of the 1983 MLB draft. Luecken pitched four seasons in the Mariners Minor League system before being traded along with Danny Tartabull to Kansas City in exchange for Scott Bankhead, Mike Kingery and Steve Shields.

In 1989, Luecken posted a 2-1 record with one save and a 3.42 earned run average in 19 relief appearances with the Royals.

Before the 1990 season, Luecken was traded along with Charlie Leibrandt to Atlanta for Gerald Perry and one minor leaguer. He went 1-4 with a 5.77 ERA in 36 games and was traded by the Braves late in the year to Toronto.
