= Ed Whited =

American baseball player (born 1964)

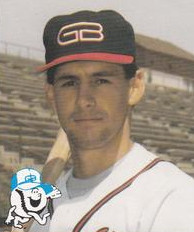
- Whited in 1988
- Third baseman
- Born: February 9, 1964 (age 61); Bristol, Pennsylvania
- Batted: Right Threw: Right

MLB debut
- July 5, 1989, for the Atlanta Braves

Last MLB appearance
- October 1, 1989, for the Atlanta Braves

MLB statistics
- Batting average: .162
- Hits: 12
- Games played: 36
- Stats at Baseball Reference

Teams
- Atlanta Braves (1989)

Edward Morris Whited (born February 9, 1964) is an American former Major League Baseball third baseman who played in 36 games for the Atlanta Braves during their 1989 season.

== Biography ==
A native of Morrisville, Bucks County, Pennsylvania, Whited moved to Trenton, New Jersey, and then to nearby Hightstown, New Jersey, graduating in 1982 from Hightstown High School. He attended Rider University, and in 1984 he played collegiate summer baseball with the Falmouth Commodores of the Cape Cod Baseball League. He was selected by the Houston Astros in the 18th round of the 1986 MLB draft. In 1987, while playing for the Asheville Tourists, Whited was named the South Atlantic League MVP.
