= Jim Vatcher =

American baseball player (born 1966)

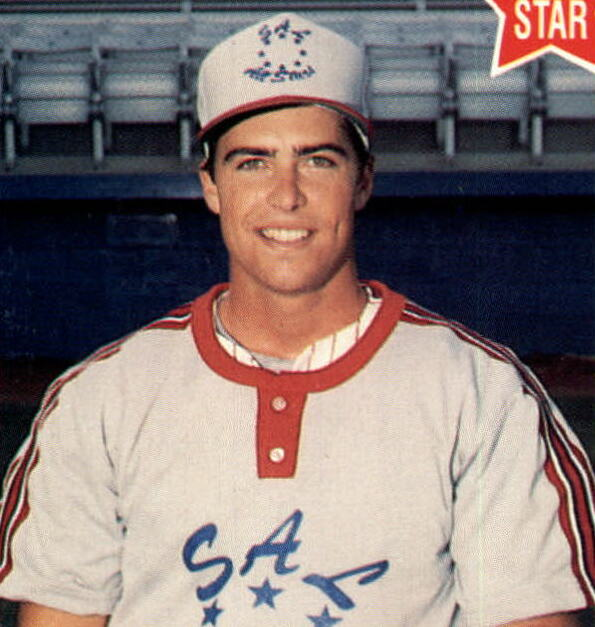
- Vatcher c. 1988
- Outfielder
- Born: May 27, 1966 (age 60); Santa Monica, California, U.S.
- Batted: Right Threw: Right

MLB debut
- May 30, 1990, for the Philadelphia Phillies

Last MLB appearance
- October 4, 1992, for the San Diego Padres

MLB statistics
- Batting average: .248
- Home runs: 1
- Runs batted in: 11
- Stats at Baseball Reference

Teams
- Philadelphia Phillies (1990); Atlanta Braves (1990); San Diego Padres (1991–1992)

James Ernest Vatcher (born May 27, 1966) is an American former professional baseball outfielder, who played parts of three seasons in Major League Baseball (MLB) (1990–1992), for the Philadelphia Phillies, Atlanta Braves, and San Diego Padres.

Vatcher attended Palisades Charter High School in Los Angeles before beginning his college baseball career at West Los Angeles College. Vatcher then transferred to Cal State Northridge to play in NCAA Division II for the Matadors. As a senior, he was voted to the All-California Collegiate Athletic Association First Team as well as the Division II All-America team after hitting .354, scoring 72 runs, hitting 15 home runs and stealing 14 bases. In spite of that, largely because he stood only 5 ft 8 in (1.73 m) tall, professional baseball scouts did not show much interest in Vatcher and Gordon Monson wrote in the Los Angeles Times in 1987 that his "playing days [would] probably end" following his senior year at Northridge.

Vatcher was drafted by the Phillies in the 20th round of the 1987 Major League Baseball draft and assigned to the Utica Blue Sox of the New York–Penn League to begin his professional career. He made his Major League debut on May 30, 1990, against the San Diego Padres at Veterans Stadium as a pinch hitter for Marvin Freeman. On August 9, he was sent along with Jeff Parrett to the Atlanta Braves as the player to be named later in the trade that had brought Dale Murphy to the Phillies.

In February 1991, the San Diego Padres claimed Vatcher off waivers from the Braves. He spent all but 17 games in the minor leagues with the Las Vegas Stars. His contract was renewed before the 1992 season and he again spent almost the entire season in the minors. He appeared in only 13 games for the Padres, his last games at the big league level.

During 1994 and 1995, Vatcher spent time in the farm systems of the Phillies, Padres and New York Mets. By 1996, he had moved on to independent baseball, playing for the Madison Black Wolf of the Northern League. He played from 1999 until 2001 with Rimini of the Italian Baseball League, his final seasons in professional baseball.
