= Joe Breeden =

American baseball player and coach

Joseph Thomas Breeden (born October 11, 1956) is a professional baseball coach, who worked in Major League Baseball.

== Career ==
Breeden played minor league baseball in 1979 for the Calgary Expos of the Rookie-level Pioneer League, a Montreal Expos affiliate. In 1980, he played for the Rocky Mount Pines, an unaffiliated team in the Class A Carolina League.

After retiring as a player, Breeden began to coach in high school and college baseball. He managed in the minor leagues. Breeden then coached the Florida Marlins and Toronto Blue Jays.
