= Daryl Smith (baseball) =

American baseball player (born 1960)

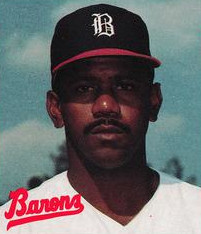
- Smith in 1988
- Pitcher
- Born: July 29, 1960 (age 65); Baltimore, Maryland, U.S.
- Batted: Right Threw: Right

MLB debut
- September 18, 1990, for the Kansas City Royals

Last MLB appearance
- October 3, 1990, for the Kansas City Royals

MLB statistics
- Win–loss record: 0–1
- Earned run average: 4.05
- Strikeouts: 6

CPBL statistics
- Win–loss record: 4–5
- Earned run average: 4.97
- Strikeouts: 41
- Stats at Baseball Reference

Teams
- Asheville Tourists (1980); Tulsa Drillers (1983); Waterbury Indians (1986); Williamsport Bills (1987); Birmingham Barons (1988); Kansas City Royals (1990); Omaha Royals (1990-1991); Columbus Clippers (1995); Jungo Bears (1995); Sinon Bulls (1996)

Daryl Clinton Smith (born July 29, 1960) is an American former Major League Baseball pitcher. Originally drafted by the Texas Rangers in 1980, he played for various Minor League Baseball teams until he made his major league debut in 1990. He pitched two games for the Kansas City Royals before continuing to pitch in the minor leagues again. He then started to play for the Chinese Professional Baseball League in 1995, finishing his career with the Sinon Bulls in 1996.

== Sources ==
- Career statistics from Baseball Reference · Baseball Reference (Minors) · Retrosheet · Baseball Almanac
