= Bobby Moore (outfielder) =

American baseball player (born 1965)

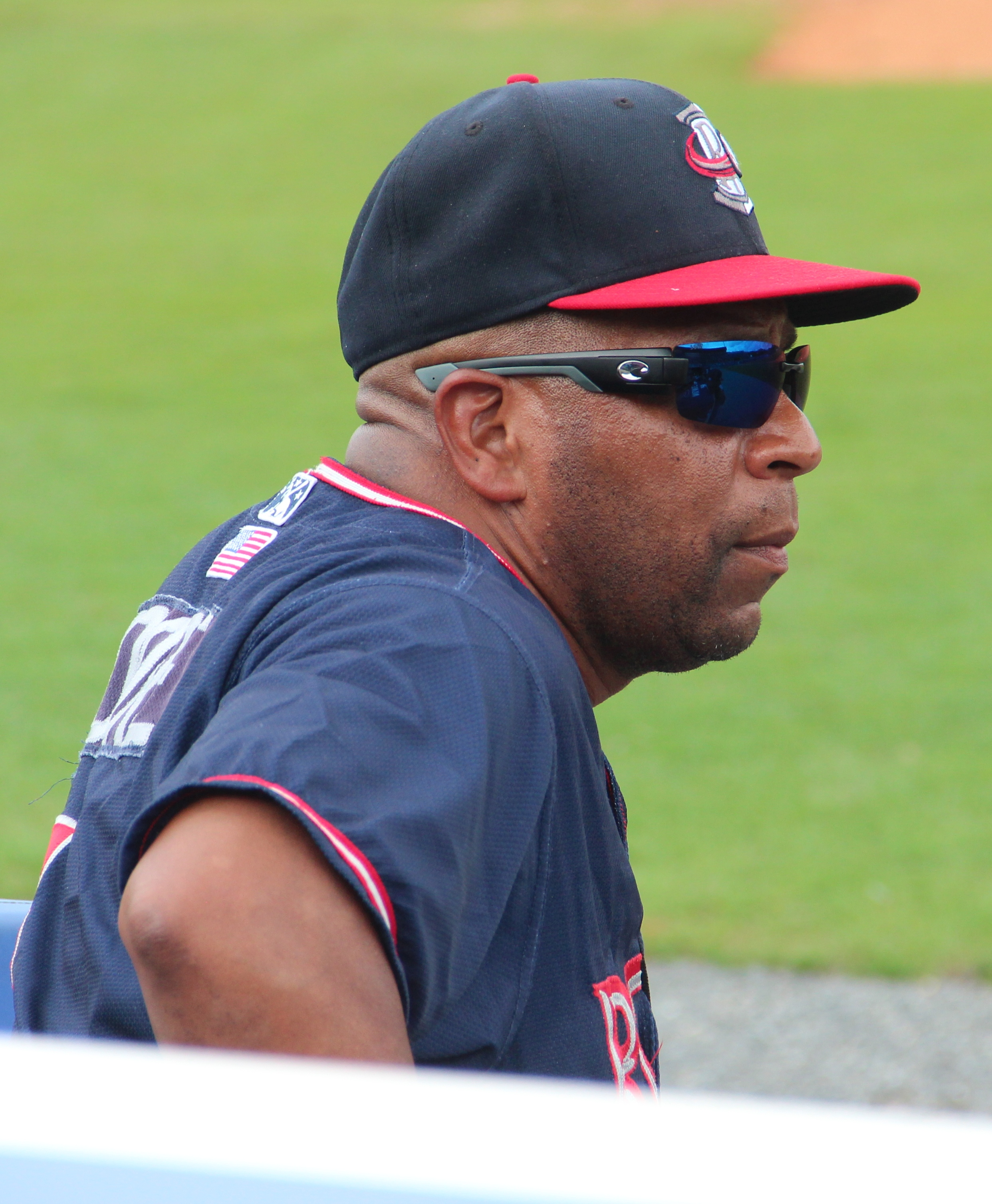
- Moore with the Rome Braves in 2018
- Outfielder
- Born: October 27, 1965 (age 60); Cincinnati, Ohio, U.S.
- Batted: Right Threw: Right

MLB debut
- September 5, 1991, for the Kansas City Royals

Last MLB appearance
- October 6, 1991, for the Kansas City Royals

MLB statistics
- Batting average: .357
- Hits: 5
- Stolen bases: 3
- Stats at Baseball Reference

Teams
- Kansas City Royals (1991)

Robert Vincent Moore (born October 27, 1965) is an American former professional baseball outfielder. He played in 18 games for the Kansas City Royals of Major League Baseball (MLB) during the 1991 Kansas City Royals season. He is currently the batting coach for the Rome Braves.

Moore was named as the batting coach for the A Rome Braves in the Atlanta Braves organization for the 2018 season.
