= Mike Bell (first baseman) =

American baseball player (born 1968)

- First baseman
- Born: April 22, 1968 (age 58); Lewiston, New York, U.S.
- Batted: Left Threw: Left

MLB debut
- May 2, 1990, for the Atlanta Braves

Last MLB appearance
- October 6, 1991, for the Atlanta Braves

MLB statistics
- Batting average: .200
- Home runs: 2
- Runs batted in: 6
- Stats at Baseball Reference

Teams
- Atlanta Braves (1990–1991)

Michael Allen Bell (born April 22, 1968) is an American former Major League Baseball player for the Atlanta Braves in 1990 and 1991 as well as several minor league teams.

Bell played for the Durham Bulls in 1998, when the film Bull Durham was released, and wrote the first name of the main character, Crash, on his bat.

Bell reached the majors in 1990, playing in 53 games combine with Atlanta over two seasons. In 1993, he played for the Double-A Buffalo Bisons in the Pittsburgh Pirates minor league system.

After his brief major league career, Bell was a replacement player for Atlanta in spring training in 1995 during the players' strike.
