= Terry Blocker =

American baseball player

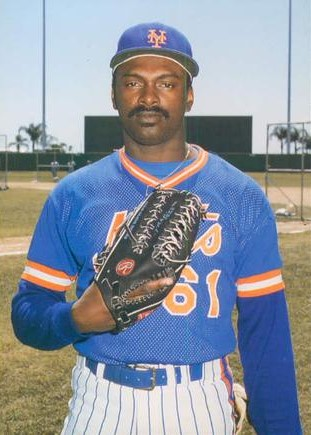
- Outfielder
- Born: August 18, 1959 (age 67); Columbia, South Carolina, U.S.
- Batted: Left Threw: Left

MLB debut
- April 11, 1985, for the New York Mets

Last MLB appearance
- June 11, 1989, for the Atlanta Braves

MLB statistics
- Batting average: .205
- Home runs: 2
- Runs batted in: 11
- Stats at Baseball Reference

Teams
- New York Mets (1985); Atlanta Braves (1988–1989)

Terry Fennell Blocker (born August 18, 1959) is an American former Major League Baseball (MLB) outfielder who played with the New York Mets and Atlanta Braves. The 6'2" outfielder batted and threw left handed.

== MLB career ==
Blocker was the Mets' first round selection (#4 overall) in the 1981 Major League Baseball draft out of Tennessee State University. In his first professional season, 1981, he batted .341 with seven home runs for the Little Falls Mets of the New York–Penn League. In 1982, he played for the Mets' minor league affiliate in Jackson, where he shared the outfield with two players who would go on to greater fame - Darryl Strawberry and Billy Beane.

In 1985, Blocker played in 18 games in the Major Leagues for the New York Mets. He got one hit in 15 at bats. He sustained a bruised tendon above his left knee in a collision with Danny Heep in right-centerfield that resulted in Terry Pendleton's inside-the-park grand slam in the fifth inning of an 8–2 loss to the St. Louis Cardinals in the second game of a doubleheader at Shea Stadium on June 9, 1985. He spent the entire 1986 and 1987 seasons in the minor leagues.

He was traded to the Braves before the 1988 season and had his most successful season, playing in 66 games, mostly as a center fielder, and had a batting average of .212 in 198 at bats. He also had 2 home runs, 10 RBIs and scored 13 runs. 1989 was his final major league season playing in only 26 games. Blocker also pitched once for Atlanta in 1989, allowing two walks in one inning.

Although posting just a .205 batting average (50-for-244) with 2 home runs and 11 RBI in 110 games in the majors, he was a strong defensive outfielder. He committed only one miscue in 177 total chances for a .994 fielding percentage.

Blocker played in the Mexican League from 1990 to 1994.

== Personal ==
When fellow Braves replacement player Dave Shotkoski was murdered near the Braves' hotel in West Palm Beach, Florida in March 1995, Blocker went into the neighborhood near the hotel to search for the killer. West Palm Beach police confirmed Blocker helped target suspect Neal Douglas Evans. The locals initially stonewalled Blocker, but eventually word got out that Evans was bragging about the murder. Blocker learned Evans was hiding in an alleged crack house and relayed that to police. They arrested Evans—who, police said, had a rap sheet "seven feet long"—at the house.
