= Jeff Wetherby =

American baseball player (born 1963)

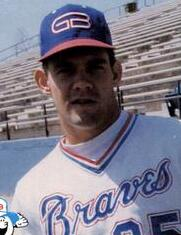
- Wetherby with the Greenville Braves c. 1987
- Left Fielder
- Born: October 18, 1963 (age 62); Granada Hills, California, U.S.
- Batted: Left Threw: Left

MLB debut
- June 7, 1989, for the Atlanta Braves

Last MLB appearance
- October 1, 1989, for the Atlanta Braves

MLB statistics
- Batting average: .208
- Home runs: 1
- Runs batted in: 7
- Stats at Baseball Reference

Teams
- Atlanta Braves (1989)

Jeffrey Barret Wetherby (born October 18, 1963) is an American former professional baseball outfielder who played for the Atlanta Braves of Major League Baseball (MLB) in 1989.

== Career ==
Prior to playing professionally, Wetherby attended Kennedy High School and then College of the Canyons and University of Southern California. He was originally drafted by the Philadelphia Phillies in the 10th round of the 1984 MLB draft, however he did not sign. He was then drafted by the Braves in the 21st round of the 1985 MLB draft, signing.

Wetherby made his MLB debut with the Braves on June 7, 1989, at the age of 25. In his first career at-bat, pinch hitting for Geronimo Berroa, Wetherby singled to drive in base runner Dale Murphy. A few days later Wetherby had pinch hits in back to back games at the Astrodome. He thus was 3 for 3 in his first three MLB at bats and all three were pinch hits. On September 2, pinch hitting for Tony Castillo, Wetherby hit his first and only MLB career home run off of future Braves pitcher Greg Maddux. On October 1, he appeared in his final MLB game.

Overall, Wetherby spent 52 games with the Braves in 1989, hitting .208 with two doubles, one triple and one home run. He was used mostly as a pinch hitter, appearing in only nine games in the field.

Despite having a short MLB career, Wetherby enjoyed an eight-year minor league career. In 771 minor league games, Wetherby hit .283 with 156 doubles, 17 triples and 52 home runs. He collected 740 hits in 2,614 at-bats. In 1987 with the Greenville Braves, he hit .303 with 31 doubles, four triples and 12 home runs in 140 games.

On March 18, 1990, he was traded by the Braves with minor leaguer Miguel Sabino to the Cleveland Indians for Tommy Hinzo. He is currently a scout for the Detroit Tigers.
