= Greg Tubbs =

American baseball player (born 1962)

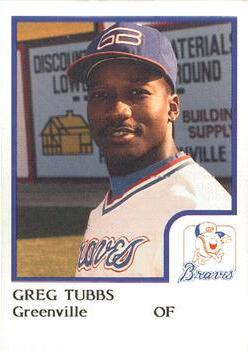
- Tubbs with the Greenville Braves in 1986
- Outfielder
- Born: August 31, 1962 (age 63); Smithville, Tennessee, U.S.
- Batted: Right Threw: Right

MLB debut
- August 1, 1993, for the Cincinnati Reds

Last MLB appearance
- October 3, 1993, for the Cincinnati Reds

MLB statistics
- Batting average: .186
- Home runs: 1
- Runs batted in: 2
- Stats at Baseball Reference

Teams
- Cincinnati Reds (1993)

Gregory Alan Tubbs (born August 31, 1962) is an American former Major League Baseball player who played for the Cincinnati Reds in 1993. After debuting on August 1, 1993, he only appeared in 35 games before his final game later in the year. Tubbs was drafted in the 22nd round of the 1984 amateur draft by the Atlanta Braves and was traded to the Pittsburgh Pirates for Rico Rossy.

Tubbs' son, Darien, was drafted in the 16th round of the 2016 MLB draft by the Los Angeles Dodgers.
