= Víctor Rosario =

Dominican baseball player

- Shortstop / Second baseman / Pinch runner
- Born: August 26, 1966 (age 59); Hato Mayor del Rey, Hato Mayor, Dominican Republic
- Batted: Right Threw: Right

MLB debut
- September 6, 1990, for the Atlanta Braves

Last MLB appearance
- October 3, 1990, for the Atlanta Braves

MLB statistics
- Batting average: .143
- Home runs: 0
- Runs batted in: 0

CPBL statistics
- Batting average: .270
- Home runs: 2
- Runs batted in: 17
- Stats at Baseball Reference

Teams
- Atlanta Braves (1990); Mercuries Tigers (1993)

Víctor Manuel "Rivera" Rosario (born August 26, 1966 in Hato Mayor del Rey, Hato Mayor, Dominican Republic) is a Dominican former Major League Baseball player. He played one season with the Atlanta Braves in 1990.
