= Drew Denson =

American baseball player (1965–2014)

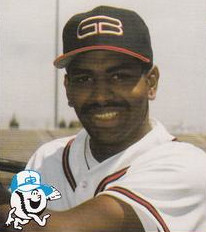
- Denson in 1988
- First baseman
- Born: November 16, 1965; Cincinnati, Ohio, U.S.
- Died: February 13, 2014 (aged 48); Cincinnati, Ohio, U.S.
- Batted: Switch Threw: Right

MLB debut
- September 13, 1989, for the Atlanta Braves

Last MLB appearance
- October 3, 1993, for the Chicago White Sox

MLB statistics
- Batting average: .244
- Runs: 1
- Hits: 10
- Stats at Baseball Reference

Teams
- Atlanta Braves (1989); Chicago White Sox (1993)

Andrew Denson (November 16, 1965 – February 13, 2014) was an American Major League Baseball first baseman. He played during two seasons at the major league level for the Atlanta Braves and Chicago White Sox. He was drafted by the Braves in the 1st round (19th pick) of the 1984 amateur draft. Denson played his first professional season with their Rookie League Gulf Coast Braves in 1984, and his last with the Baltimore Orioles' Triple-A affiliate, the Rochester Red Wings, in 1996.

Denson died on February 13, 2014, at the age of 48. Cause of death was not listed. Denson had a rare blood disease called amyloidosis, a condition in which abnormal protein deposits cause organs and tissues to deteriorate.
