= Paul Marak =

English baseball player (born 1965)

- Pitcher
- Born: August 2, 1965 (age 60); Lakenheath, England
- Batted: Right Threw: Right

MLB debut
- September 1, 1990, for the Atlanta Braves

Last MLB appearance
- October 2, 1990, for the Atlanta Braves

MLB statistics
- Win–loss record: 1–2
- Earned run average: 3.69
- Strikeouts: 15
- Stats at Baseball Reference

Teams
- Atlanta Braves (1990)

Paul Patrick Marak (born August 2, 1965) is an English born baseball pitcher. He played for Major League Baseball in 1990 with the Atlanta Braves. He batted and threw right-handed. He had a 1-2 record, with a 3.69 ERA, in seven games, in his one-year career.

Born in England, Marak was raised in Alamogordo, New Mexico.

Marak attended Trinidad State Junior College in Trinidad, Colorado. He was drafted by the Braves in the 11th round of the 1985 amateur draft. He retired from professional baseball in 1993.
