= Archie Corbin =

American baseball player (born 1967)

- Pitcher
- Born: December 30, 1967 (age 57); Beaumont, Texas
- Batted: Right Threw: Right

MLB debut
- September 10, 1991, for the Kansas City Royals

Last MLB appearance
- July 29, 1999, for the Florida Marlins

MLB statistics
- Win–loss record: 2-1
- Earned run average: 4.44
- Strikeouts: 51
- Stats at Baseball Reference

Teams
- Kansas City Royals (1991); Baltimore Orioles (1996); Florida Marlins (1999)

Archie Ray Corbin (born December 30, 1967) is a former Major League Baseball pitcher. He attended Beaumont-Charlton-Pollard HS. Archie came into the league without any college experience. He played for the Kansas City Royals in 1991, Baltimore Orioles in 1996, and Florida Marlins in 1999. Archie Corbin was drafted by the New York Mets in the amateur draft, but never played for them. Instead he started his career in 1991 with the Royals, being traded for Pat Tabler. Archie came into the league as a relief pitcher, which was a pitcher who came in later in the game to relief the previous pitcher. Archie played 3 years before retiring in 1999. After his career he continued to be around baseball, being a coach in Texas.

== See also ==
- List of Major League Baseball single-inning strikeout leaders
