= Danny Tartabull =

Puerto Rican baseball player (born 1962)

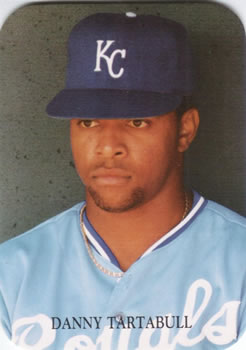
- Right fielder / Designated hitter
- Born: October 30, 1962 (age 63); San Juan, Puerto Rico
- Batted: Right Threw: Right

MLB debut
- September 7, 1984, for the Seattle Mariners

Last MLB appearance
- April 7, 1997, for the Philadelphia Phillies

MLB statistics
- Batting average: .273
- Home runs: 262
- Runs batted in: 925
- Stats at Baseball Reference

Teams
- Seattle Mariners (1984–1986); Kansas City Royals (1987–1991); New York Yankees (1992–1995); Oakland Athletics (1995); Chicago White Sox (1996); Philadelphia Phillies (1997)

Career highlights and awards
- All-Star (1991)

Danilo Tartabull Mora (born October 30, 1962) is a Cuban–Puerto Rican former professional baseball right fielder and designated hitter. He played 14 seasons in Major League Baseball (MLB) for the Seattle Mariners (1984–1986), Kansas City Royals (1987–1991), New York Yankees (1992–1995), Oakland Athletics (1995), Chicago White Sox (1996), and Philadelphia Phillies (1997).

== Early life ==
Tartabull was born on October 30, 1962, in San Juan, Puerto Rico, the son of Cuban parents. His father, José Tartabull, played in Major League Baseball from 1962 to 1970. Tartabull attended Miami Carol City Senior High School in Miami Gardens, Florida where he played baseball and basketball. As a senior, he was an all-state second baseman. He was drafted by the Cincinnati Reds in the third round of the 1980 Major League Baseball draft.

== Playing career ==
Tartabull played for the Seattle Mariners (1984–86), Kansas City Royals (1987–91), New York Yankees (1992–95), Oakland Athletics (1995), Chicago White Sox (1996), and Philadelphia Phillies (1997). Originally a shortstop, Tartabull broke into the majors for good in 1986 with the Mariners, who moved him to right field after briefly experimenting with him at second base. He responded by hitting .270 with 25 home runs and 96 runs batted in, but his rookie season was overshadowed by those of Wally Joyner and José Canseco.

After the 1986 season, the Mariners traded Tartabull to Kansas City for prospects Scott Bankhead, Mike Kingery, and Steve Shields. In 1987, Tartabull improved to .309/34/101. Although sometimes slowed by injuries, Tartabull had five productive seasons with Kansas City, culminating with an All-Star selection in 1991. That same year, Tartabull led the major leagues in slugging percentage (.593). He became a free agent after the 1991 season and signed a deal with the Yankees worth more than $5 million a year (the deal being the first piece of news on ESPN Radio), but he never again matched his production in Kansas City.

In July 1995 the Yankees traded Tartabull to the Athletics for Rubén Sierra and Jason Beverlin. Following his trade out of New York, Tartabull expressed his disdain for Yankees owner George Steinbrenner, saying that getting out of New York was like having been "released from jail". The Athletics traded him to the White Sox the following winter for Andrew Lorraine and minor leaguer Charles Poe. He had 101 RBIs but scored 58 runs, fewer runs than all but one player in history with at least 100 RBIs. Tartabull wound down his 14-year career with the Phillies in 1997, appearing in just three games.

Tartabull retired following the 1997 season with a career batting average of .273, 262 home runs, and 925 runs batted in. (When Danny's father José Tartabull was asked how his son was such a slugger while José hit only two home runs in his MLB career, the elder Tartabull said, "(Danny) gets his power from his mother.")

== Personal life ==
In 2011, Tartabull was criminally convicted for failing to pay $276,000 in child support. Tartabull received probation, and when he violated the terms of his probation, the court gave him a 180-day jail sentence. When he failed to report for this prison sentence, the court issued a warrant for his arrest. The police did not arrest Tartabull until five years later when he called police to report his car was broken into.

== Other media ==
During the 1994–1995 MLB strike, Tartabull and a handful of other striking players appeared as themselves in the November 27, 1994 episode of Married... with Children (Season 9, Episode 11.)

Tartabull made a cameo appearance on TV sitcom Seinfeld as himself in the episodes "The Chaperone" and "The Pledge Drive".

== See also ==
- List of Major League Baseball players from Puerto Rico
- List of Major League Baseball career home run leaders
- List of second-generation Major League Baseball players
