= Kelly Mann (baseball) =

American baseball player (born 1967)

- Catcher
- Born: August 17, 1967 (age 58); Santa Monica, California, U.S.
- Batted: Right Threw: Right

MLB debut
- September 4, 1989, for the Atlanta Braves

Last MLB appearance
- October 3, 1990, for the Atlanta Braves

MLB statistics
- Batting average: .173
- Home runs: 1
- Runs batted in: 3
- Stats at Baseball Reference

Teams
- Atlanta Braves (1989–1990)

Kelly John Mann (born August 17, 1967) is an American former professional baseball catcher who played in the Major Leagues for the Atlanta Braves during 1989 and 1990. He also played for the Pueblo Big Horns and Mobile Baysharks of the Texas-Louisiana League in 1995.
