= Carlos Maldonado (pitcher) =

Panamanian baseball player (born 1966)

- Pitcher
- Born: October 18, 1966 (age 59); Chepo, Panama
- Batted: Right Threw: Right

MLB debut
- September 16, 1990, for the Kansas City Royals

Last MLB appearance
- October 3, 1993, for the Milwaukee Brewers

MLB statistics
- Win–loss record: 2-2
- Earned run average: 5.65
- Strikeouts: 28
- Stats at Baseball Reference

Teams
- Kansas City Royals (1990–91); Milwaukee Brewers (1993)

Carlos César Maldonado Delgado (born October 18, 1966) is a Panamanian former pitcher in Major League Baseball. He won two games in the majors (both in 1993) and on August 15, 1993, he recorded the only save of his MLB career. He pitched a scoreless ninth inning to nail down a 6-4 Brewers win over the Tigers.

== Sources ==
- Career statistics from MLB · Baseball Reference · Retrosheet · Baseball Almanac
