= Andrés Thomas =

Dominican baseball player (born 1963)

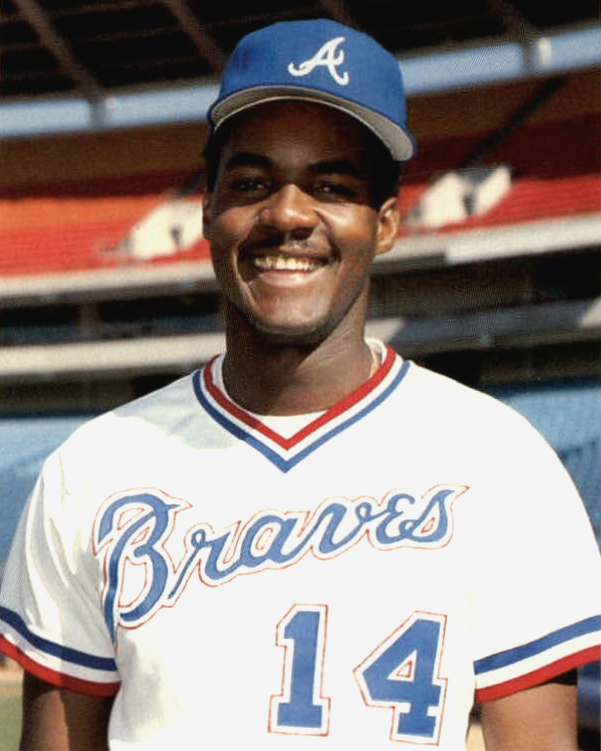
- Thomas with the Atlanta Braves c. 1986
- Shortstop
- Born: November 10, 1963 (age 62); Boca Chica, Dominican Republic
- Batted: Right Threw: Right

MLB debut
- September 3, 1985, for the Atlanta Braves

Last MLB appearance
- September 16, 1990, for the Atlanta Braves

MLB statistics
- Batting average: .234
- Home runs: 42
- Runs batted in: 228
- Stats at Baseball Reference

Teams
- Atlanta Braves (1985–1990)

Andrés Péres Thomas (born November 10, 1963) is a Dominican former professional baseball shortstop who played for the Atlanta Braves of Major League Baseball from 1985 to 1990. He batted and threw right-handed. Thomas brought a power to the shortstop position for the Braves (13 HR each in 1988 and 1989); however, he struck out frequently (95 Ks in 1988) and walked only 59 times in five seasons. His free-swinging prompted then-Braves' broadcaster Don Sutton to ask hypothetically during games, "Why would you even throw him a strike?" He was also an erratic fielder, leading all National League shortstops with 29 errors in 1988.

He was the manager of the Detroit Tigers' affiliate in the Dominican Summer League for 2006.
