= Gerald Perry =

American baseball player and coach (born 1960)

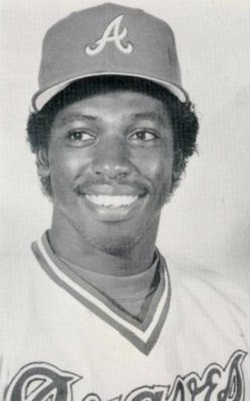
- First baseman
- Born: October 30, 1960 (age 65); Savannah, Georgia, U.S.
- Batted: Left Threw: Right

MLB debut
- August 11, 1983, for the Atlanta Braves

Last MLB appearance
- August 24, 1995, for the St. Louis Cardinals

MLB statistics
- Batting average: .265
- Home runs: 59
- Runs batted in: 396
- Stats at Baseball Reference

Teams
- As player: Atlanta Braves (1983–1989); Kansas City Royals (1990); St. Louis Cardinals (1991–1995); As coach: Seattle Mariners (2000–2002); Pittsburgh Pirates (2003–2005); Oakland Athletics (2006); Chicago Cubs (2007–2009); Oakland Athletics (2011)

Career highlights and awards
- All-Star (1988)

Gerald June Perry (born October 30, 1960) is an American former professional baseball first baseman. He played from 1983 to 1995 for the Atlanta Braves, Kansas City Royals and St. Louis Cardinals of Major League Baseball (MLB). He is the nephew of former major-leaguer Dan Driessen.

== Career ==
In 1988, Perry had his best season, batting .300. He was one of only five National League batters that hit .300 or better that season who had the required number of plate appearances to qualify for the batting title. Perry was a contender for the title virtually the entire season, but ended up fifth. Tony Gwynn won the title that season by batting .313. For his efforts, Perry was named to the 1988 NL All-Star team.

In 1993 he tied a St. Louis Cardinals single-season club record with 24 pinch hits, and in 1995 he became the Cardinals all-time pinch-hit leader with his 70th Cardinal pinch hit.

Perry was hitting coach for the Seattle Mariners from 2000 to 2002, the Pittsburgh Pirates from 2003 to 2005, the Oakland Athletics in 2006, and the Chicago Cubs from 2007 until he was fired on June 13, 2009. The Cubs replaced him with Von Joshua. In 2011, the Athletics re-hired him as batting coach and let him go after the season ended.

He was the hitting coach for the AAA Pawtucket Red Sox in 2012. Perry joined the Erie SeaWolves for the 2013 season as their hitting coach.

He was the hitting coach for the USA team in the 2013 World Baseball Classic.
