= 1990 Pittsburgh Pirates season =

1990 Pittsburgh Pirates
- National League East champions
- League: National League
- Division: East
- Ballpark: Three Rivers Stadium
- City: Pittsburgh, Pennsylvania
- Record: 95–67 (.586)
- Divisional place: 1st
- Owners: Pittsburgh Associates
- General managers: Larry Doughty
- Managers: Jim Leyland
- Television: KDKA-TV; KBL
- Radio: KDKA-AM (Steve Blass, Kent Derdivanis, Lanny Frattare, Jim Rooker)

The 1990 Pittsburgh Pirates season was their 109th season; the 104th in the National League. This was their 21st season at Three Rivers Stadium. The Pirates finished first in the National League East with a record of 95–67. They were defeated four games to two by the Cincinnati Reds in the NLCS.

== Offseason ==
- December 4, 1989: Gordon Dillard was drafted by the Pirates from the Philadelphia Phillies in the 1989 rule 5 draft.
- January 14, 1990: Mark Ross was signed as a free agent by the Pirates.
- January 31, 1990: Wally Backman was signed as a free agent by the Pirates.

== Regular season ==
- Barry Bonds became the first Major Leaguer in history to have a .300 batting average, 100 RBI, 100 runs and 50 stolen bases in the same season. With 33 home runs, he became the second to have 30 home runs and 50 steals in a season, following Cincinnati's Eric Davis in 1987.

=== Season standings ===
NL East
Team	W	L	Pct.	GB	Home	Road
Pittsburgh Pirates	95	67	.586	—	49‍–‍32	46‍–‍35
New York Mets	91	71	.562	4	52‍–‍29	39‍–‍42
Montreal Expos	85	77	.525	10	47‍–‍34	38‍–‍43
Chicago Cubs	77	85	.475	18	39‍–‍42	38‍–‍43
Philadelphia Phillies	77	85	.475	18	41‍–‍40	36‍–‍45
St. Louis Cardinals	70	92	.432	25	34‍–‍47	36‍–‍45

=== Game log ===
1990 Game Log: 95–67 (Home: 49–32; Away: 46–35)
April: 14–6 (Home: 2–4; Away: 12–2)

#	Date	Opponent	Score	Win	Loss	Save	Attendance	Record
1	April 9	@ Mets	12–3	**Drabek**	Gooden	—	47,919	1–0
2	April 11	@ Mets	0–3	Viola	**Smiley**	Franco	16,880	1–1
3	April 12	@ Mets	6–2	**Heaton**	Fernandez	—	16,544	2–1
4	April 13	Cubs	0–2	Maddux	**Walk**	Williams	44,799	2–2
5	April 14	Cubs	1–4	Harkey	**Drabek**	Williams	13,226	2–3
6	April 15	Cubs	4–3 (10)	**Patterson**	Lancaster	—	6,289	3–3
7	April 16	Cardinals	4–6	DeLeon	**Smiley**	Horton	7,136	3–4
8	April 17	Cardinals	7–2	**Heaton**	Mathews	—	3,981	4–4
9	April 18	Cardinals	0–3	Tudor	**Walk**	Dayley	11,626	4–5
10	April 19	@ Cardinals	5–1	**Drabek**	Magrane	—	20,495	5–5
11	April 20	@ Cubs	9–4 (7)	**Roesler**	Bielecki	—	15,171	6–5
12	April 21	@ Cubs	4–3	**Smiley**	Wilson	**Landrum**	37,091	7–5
13	April 22	@ Cubs	3–2	**Heaton**	Nunez	**Power**	33,583	8–5
14	April 23	@ Cardinals	4–7	Tudor	**Walk**	—	22,748	8–6
15	April 24	@ Giants	4–1	**Drabek**	Garrelts	**Landrum**	10,881	9–6
16	April 25	@ Giants	7–4 (12)	**Patterson**	Bedrosian	—	10,698	10–6
17	April 26	@ Giants	2–1	**Smiley**	LaCoss	—	10,493	11–6
18	April 27	@ Padres	9–4	**Heaton**	Show	—	23,376	12–6
19	April 28	@ Padres	4–3	**Walk**	Benes	**Landrum**	26,473	13–6
20	April 29	@ Padres	10–1	**Drabek**	Rasmussen	—	27,206	14–6

May: 15–11 (Home: 13–2; Away: 2–9)

#	Date	Opponent	Score	Win	Loss	Save	Attendance	Record
21	May 1	@ Dodgers	1–4	Belcher	**Terrell**	—	31,292	14–7
22	May 2	@ Dodgers	2–6	Valenzuela	**Smiley**	—	32,089	14–8
23	May 6	Braves	6–4	**Heaton**	Smoltz	**Ruskin**		15–8
24	May 6	Braves	4–2	**Drabek**	Lilliquist	**Patterson**	17,108	16–8
25	May 7	Padres	4–1	**Walk**	Hurst	**Power**	9,653	17–8
26	May 8	Padres	10–2	**Terrell**	Show	—	10,694	18–8
27	May 9	Reds	6–2	**Smiley**	Armstrong	**Landrum**	17,149	19–8
28	May 10	Reds	4–10	Charlton	**Power**	—	15,071	19–9
29	May 11	Astros	4–3	**Drabek**	Deshaies	**Landrum**	24,734	20–9
30	May 12	Astros	3–1	**Heaton**	Portugal	**Power**	16,066	21–9
31	May 13	Astros	5–1	**Walk**	Gullickson	**Landrum**	16,658	22–9
32	May 14	@ Reds	3–5	Armstrong	**Terrell**	Myers	24,211	22–10
33	May 15	@ Reds	4–5 (11)	Layana	**Patterson**	—	13,353	22–11
34	May 17	@ Braves	1–6	Lilliquist	**Heaton**	Hesketh	6,340	22–12
35	May 18	@ Braves	9–3	**Walk**	Clary	—	19,001	23–12
36	May 19	@ Braves	1–2	Glavine	**Terrell**	Hesketh	26,170	23–13
37	May 20	@ Braves	11–13	Smith	**Kipper**	Boever	8,288	23–14
38	May 21	@ Astros	2–3 (11)	Agosto	**Power**	—	8,116	23–15
39	May 22	@ Astros	8–4	**Heaton**	Schatzeder	—	8,661	24–15
40	May 23	@ Astros	3–7	Agosto	**Ruskin**	—	10,961	24–16
41	May 25	Giants	8–9	Burkett	**Terrell**	Brantley	24,644	24–17
42	May 26	Giants	10–4	**Drabek**	Garrelts	—	25,150	25–17
43	May 27	Giants	5–2	**Heaton**	Reuschel	**Power**	23,943	26–17
44	May 28	Dodgers	6–5	**Landrum**	Howell	—	26,171	27–17
45	May 29	Dodgers	9–5	**Patterson**	Valenzuela	**Ruskin**	10,252	28–17
46	May 30	Dodgers	5–3	**Terrell**	Martinez	**Landrum**	22,198	29–17

June: 14–13 (Home: 8–4; Away: 6–9)

#	Date	Opponent	Score	Win	Loss	Save	Attendance	Record
47	June 1	Expos	1–4	Gross	**Drabek**	Mohorcic	27,410	29–18
48	June 2	Expos	4–3 (10)	**Landrum**	Hall	—	47,374	30–18
49	June 3	Expos	3–4	Sampen	**Belinda**	Schmidt	27,817	30–19
50	June 4	Cubs	6–2	**Patterson**	Boskie	**Landrum**	9,257	31–19
51	June 5	Cubs	6–5	**Belinda**	Williams	—	20,642	32–19
52	June 6	Cubs	6–1 (7)	**Drabek**	Maddux	—	21,164	33–19
53	June 7	@ Mets	5–4	**Ruskin**	Musselman	**Kipper**	28,443	34–19
54	June 8	@ Mets	1–7	Fernandez	**Walk**	—	29,710	34–20
55	June 9	@ Mets	3–9	Cone	**Patterson**	—	38,379	34–21
56	June 10	@ Mets	3–8	Ojeda	**Terrell**	—	46,868	34–22
57	June 11	@ Cardinals	8–7	**Belinda**	Niedenfuer	**Landrum**	27,403	35–22
58	June 12	@ Cardinals	6–3	**Heaton**	DeLeon	**Landrum**	30,815	36–22
59	June 13	@ Cardinals	6–5	**Huismann**	DiPino	**Reed**	26,926	37–22
60	June 15	Mets	5–7	Ojeda	**Terrell**	Franco	35,935	37–23
61	June 16	Mets	11–6	**Kipper**	Viola	—	43,653	38–23
62	June 17	Mets	3–4	Gooden	**Heaton**	Franco	35,652	38–24
63	June 19	@ Phillies	1–2 (10)	Carman	**Landrum**	—	29,781	38–25
64	June 20	@ Phillies	2–7	Ruffin	**Patterson**	—	40,256	38–26
65	June 22	@ Expos	3–4	Sampen	**Belinda**	Schmidt	22,968	38–27
66	June 23	@ Expos	1–6	Smith	**Drabek**	—	27,605	38–28
67	June 24	@ Expos	5–3	**Heaton**	Martinez	**Belinda**	41,054	39–28
68	June 25	Phillies	5–0	**Reed**	de Jesus	—	29,369	40–28
69	June 26	Phillies	1–0	**Ruskin**	Ruffin	**Belinda**	25,807	41–28
70	June 27	Phillies	5–3	**Kipper**	Howell	**Landrum**	40,207	42–28
71	June 28	@ Cardinals	1–5	Tewksbury	**Drabek**	Smith	22,602	42–29
72	June 29	@ Giants	3–7	Wilson	**Heaton**	Brantley	21,231	42–30
73	June 30	@ Giants	4–3	**Kipper**	Thurmond	**Belinda**	31,159	43–30

July: 15–11 (Home: 7–7; Away: 8–4)

#	Date	Opponent	Score	Win	Loss	Save	Attendance	Record
74	July 1	@ Giants	8–5	**Tibbs**	Oliveras	**Landrum**	36,441	44–30
75	July 2	@ Padres	4–3 (14)	**Patterson**	Schiraldi	—	13,842	45–30
76	July 3	@ Padres	5–3	**Landrum**	Lefferts	—	33,949	46–30
77	July 4	@ Padres	4–5	Show	**Heaton**	Harris	10,897	46–31
78	July 5	@ Dodgers	9–6	**Reed**	Martinez	**Patterson**	36,231	47–31
79	July 6	@ Dodgers	6–3	**Smiley**	Morgan	—	33,386	48–31
80	July 7	@ Dodgers	2–4	Belcher	**Terrell**	—	38,977	48–32
81	July 8	@ Dodgers	7–2	**Drabek**	Wells	—	37,271	49–32
82	July 12	Padres	4–3 (15)	**Patterson**	Schiraldi	—	10,960	50–32
83	July 13	Padres	4–1	**Drabek**	Rasmussen	**Belinda**	16,108	51–32
84	July 14	Padres	8–4	**Power**	Harris	—	27,955	52–32
85	July 15	Padres	1–4	Whitson	**Heaton**	Lefferts	34,386	52–33
86	July 16	Giants	1–6	Garrelts	**Reed**	—	28,304	52–34
87	July 17	Giants	3–6	Robinson	**Smiley**	—	23,098	52–35
88	July 18	Giants	11–2	**Drabek**	Wilson	—	38,430	53–35
89	July 20	Dodgers	4–2	**Walk**	Morgan	**Power**	23,198	54–35
90	July 21	Dodgers	0–6	Belcher	**Heaton**	—	39,498	54–36
91	July 22	Dodgers	11–6	**Kipper**	Wells	—	26,818	55–36
92	July 23	@ Expos	0–5	Martinez	**Smiley**	—	27,499	55–37
93	July 24	@ Expos	5–3	**Drabek**	Gross	**Belinda**	24,444	56–37
94	July 25	@ Expos	7–8 (10)	Sampen	**Belinda**	—	21,669	56–38
95	July 26	Phillies	4–12	Mulholland	**Heaton**	—	24,088	56–39
96	July 27	Phillies	3–5	Cook	**Reed**	Boever	29,117	56–40
97	July 28	Phillies	3–4	Parrett	**Landrum**	Boever	37,022	56–41
98	July 29	Phillies	2–1	**Drabek**	Combs	—	33,018	57–41
99	July 31	@ Cubs	9–1	**Patterson**	Boskie	—	35,126	58–41

August: 17–14 (Home: 7–10; Away: 10–4)

#	Date	Opponent	Score	Win	Loss	Save	Attendance	Record
100	August 1	@ Cubs	0–5	Maddux	**Reed**	—	34,542	58–42
101	August 2	@ Cubs	8–5	**Smiley**	Wilson	**Walk**	34,493	59–42
102	August 3	@ Phillies	11–0	**Drabek**	Ruffin	—	36,057	60–42
103	August 4	@ Phillies	3–1 (10)	**Patterson**	McDowell	**Power**	45,305	61–42
104	August 5	@ Phillies	6–8	Carman	**Ruskin**	Boever	40,142	61–43
105	August 6	@ Phillies	10–1	**Tomlin**	Mulholland	—		62–43
106	August 6	@ Phillies	4–3 (10)	**Landrum**	McDowell	—	30,827	63–43
107	August 7	Expos	4–3 (12)	**Ross**	Mohorcic	—	23,666	64–43
108	August 8	Expos	2–6	Martinez	**Drabek**	—	21,180	64–44
109	August 9	Expos	6–7 (10)	Frey	**Landrum**	Sampen	21,499	64–45
110	August 10	Cardinals	3–8	Dayley	**Kramer**	—	23,701	64–46
111	August 11	Cardinals	2–3	Magrane	**Tomlin**	Smith	46,720	64–47
112	August 12	Cardinals	0–6	Tewksbury	**Smiley**	—	30,335	64–48
113	August 14	Braves	3–1	**Drabek**	Leibrandt	—		65–48
114	August 14	Braves	6–4	**Smith**	Avery	**Patterson**	25,542	66–48
115	August 15	Braves	1–8	Castillo	**Heaton**	—	16,063	66–49
116	August 16	Braves	4–3	**Kipper**	Mercker	—	19,304	67–49
117	August 17	@ Reds	7–1	**York**	Rijo	—		68–49
118	August 17	@ Reds	4–3	**Smiley**	Layana	**Belinda**	48,964	69–49
119	August 18	@ Reds	3–1	**Smith**	Hammond	**Kipper**	35,263	70–49
120	August 19	@ Reds	6–3	**Drabek**	Armstrong	**Belinda**	36,549	71–49
121	August 20	Astros	7–1	**Heaton**	Deshaies	—	20,997	72–49
122	August 21	Astros	1–2	Darwin	**Patterson**	—	14,062	72–50
123	August 22	Astros	4–2	**Smiley**	Gullickson	**Landrum**	29,420	73–50
124	August 23	Reds	9–3	**Smith**	Hammond	—	26,181	74–50
125	August 24	Reds	3–4	Dibble	**Kipper**	Myers	48,205	74–51
126	August 25	Reds	1–6	Charlton	**Belinda**	—	43,679	74–52
127	August 26	Reds	2–6	Mahler	**Tomlin**	Dibble	43,174	74–53
128	August 28	@ Braves	0–9	Leibrandt	**Smiley**	—	5,872	74–54
129	August 29	@ Braves	10–0 (7)	**Drabek**	Avery	—	5,403	75–54
130	August 31	@ Astros	2–3	Agosto	**Patterson**	—	10,892	75–55

September: 19–10 (Home: 11–3; Away: 8–7)

#	Date	Opponent	Score	Win	Loss	Save	Attendance	Record
131	September 1	@ Astros	1–2 (10)	Smith	**Power**	—	16,422	75–56
132	September 2	@ Astros	7–6	**Smiley**	Darwin	**Kipper**	16,598	76–56
133	September 3	Phillies	4–1	**Drabek**	Ruffin	—	23,854	77–56
134	September 4	Phillies	11–7	**Landrum**	Akerfelds	**Patterson**	16,858	78–56
135	September 5	Mets	1–0	**Smith**	Franco	—		79–56
136	September 5	Mets	3–1	**Heaton**	Ojeda	**Power**	49,793	80–56
137	September 6	Mets	7–1	**Tomlin**	Valera	—	32,528	81–56
138	September 7	Expos	1–4	Boyd	**Smiley**	Burke	22,083	81–57
139	September 8	Expos	6–1	**Drabek**	Farmer	—	44,614	82–57
140	September 9	Expos	5–9	Rojas	**Walk**	—	22,023	82–58
141	September 10	@ Phillies	3–2	**Belinda**	Boever	—	18,970	83–58
142	September 11	@ Phillies	5–1	**Tomlin**	Grimsley	—	20,289	84–58
143	September 12	@ Mets	1–2	Cone	**Smiley**	—	48,375	84–59
144	September 13	@ Mets	3–6	Gooden	**Drabek**	Franco	51,079	84–60
145	September 14	@ Expos	2–4	Frey	**Heaton**	—	15,880	84–61
146	September 15	@ Expos	3–4	Sampen	**Smith**	Burke	20,392	84–62
147	September 16	@ Expos	1–4	Ruskin	**Tomlin**	Frey	21,286	84–63
148	September 18	@ Cubs	5–8	Maddux	**Smiley**	—	23,168	84–64
149	September 19	@ Cubs	8–7	**Drabek**	Sutcliffe	**Patterson**	13,058	85–64
150	September 20	@ Cubs	11–2	**Walk**	Kramer	**Palacios**	14,926	86–64
151	September 21	Cardinals	1–0	**Smith**	DeLeon	—	29,048	87–64
152	September 22	Cardinals	2–3	Hill	**Tomlin**	Smith	22,895	87–65
153	September 23	Cardinals	7–2	**Smiley**	Tewksbury	**Palacios**	30,635	88–65
154	September 25	Cubs	5–3	**Drabek**	Wilson	—	21,644	89–65
155	September 26	Cubs	4–3	**Smith**	Coffman	—	26,157	90–65
156	September 27	Cubs	3–2	**Tomlin**	Bielecki	**Palacios**	25,049	91–65
157	September 28	@ Cardinals	6–4	**Landrum**	Hill	**Belinda**	24,837	92–65
158	September 29	@ Cardinals	8–0	**Walk**	Tewksbury	—	23,571	93–65
159	September 30	@ Cardinals	2–0	**Drabek**	Magrane	—	32,672	94–65

October: 1–2 (Home: 1–2; Away: 0–0)

#	Date	Opponent	Score	Win	Loss	Save	Attendance	Record
160	October 1	Mets	1–4	Cone	**Smith**	—	50,393	94–66
161	October 2	Mets	9–4	**Landrum**	Gooden	—	50,028	95–66
162	October 3	Mets	3–6	Viola	**York**	Pena	27,641	95–67

Legend: = Win = Loss = Postponement
Bold = Pirates team member

=== Record vs. opponents ===
1990 National League record Sources:
Team	ATL	CHC	CIN	HOU	LAD	MON	NYM	PHI	PIT	SD	SF	STL
Atlanta	—	6–6	8–10	5–13	6–12	6–6	4–8	5–7	5–7	8–10	5–13	7–5
Chicago	6–6	—	4–8	6–6	3–9	11–7	9–9	11–7	4–14	8–4	7–5	8–10
Cincinnati	10–8	8–4	—	11–7	9–9	9–3	6–6	7–5	6–6	9–9	7–11	9–3
Houston	13–5	6–6	7–11	—	9–9	5–7	5–7	5–7	5–7	4–14	10–8	6–6
Los Angeles	12–6	9–3	9–9	9–9	—	6–6	5–7	8–4	4–8	9–9	8–10	7–5
Montreal	6–6	7–11	3–9	7–5	6–6	—	8–10	10–8	13–5	7–5	7–5	11–7
New York	8–4	9–9	6–6	7–5	7–5	10–8	—	10–8	10–8	5–7	7–5	12–6
Philadelphia	7-5	7–11	5–7	7–5	4–8	8–10	8–10	—	6–12	7–5	8–4	10–8
Pittsburgh	7–5	14–4	6–6	7–5	8–4	5–13	8–10	12–6	—	10–2	8–4	10–8
San Diego	10–8	4–8	9–9	14–4	9–9	5–7	7–5	5–7	2–10	—	7–11	3–9
San Francisco	13–5	5–7	11–7	8–10	10–8	5–7	5–7	4–8	4–8	11–7	—	9–3
St. Louis	5–7	10–8	3–9	6–6	5–7	7–11	6–12	8–10	8–10	9–3	3–9	—

=== Detailed records ===
**National League**
Opponent	W	L	WP	RS	RA
**NL East**
Chicago Cubs	14	4	0.778	92	62
Montreal Expos	5	13	0.278	59	82
New York Mets	8	10	0.444	77	77
Philadelphia Phillies	12	6	0.667	83	58
St. Louis Cardinals	10	8	0.556	72	65
Total	49	41	0.544	383	344
**NL West**
Atlanta Braves	7	5	0.583	56	55
Cincinnati Reds	6	6	0.500	52	49
Houston Astros	7	5	0.583	47	35
Los Angeles Dodgers	8	4	0.667	62	52
San Diego Padres	10	2	0.833	67	34
San Francisco Giants	8	4	0.667	66	50
Total	46	26	0.639	350	275
Season Total	95	67	0.586	733	619

Month	Games	Won	Lost	Win %	RS	RA
April	20	14	6	0.700	95	59
May	26	15	11	0.577	134	112
June	27	14	13	0.519	108	119
July	26	15	11	0.577	125	110
August	31	17	14	0.548	132	116
September	29	19	10	0.655	126	89
October	3	1	2	0.333	13	14
Total	162	95	67	0.586	733	619

	Games	Won	Lost	Win %	RS	RA
Home	81	49	32	0.605	351	299
Away	81	46	35	0.568	382	320
Total	162	95	67	0.586	733	619

== Roster ==
1990 Pittsburgh Pirates
Roster
Pitchers: 46 Doug Bair; 50,60 Stan Belinda; 15 Doug Drabek; 26 Neal Heaton; 27 Mark Huismann; 16 Bob Kipper; 28 Randy Kramer; 43 Bill Landrum; 58 Vicente Palacios; 38 Bob Patterson; 48 Ted Power; 34 Rick Reed; 47,49 Jerry Reuss; 58 Mike Roesler; 29,30 Mark Ross; 56 Scott Ruskin; 57 John Smiley; 41 Zane Smith; 35 Walt Terrell; 30 Jay Tibbs; 29 Randy Tomlin; 17 Bob Walk; 53 Mike York	Catchers: 22 Dann Bilardello; 12 Mike LaValliere; 14 Tom Prince; 11 Don Slaught; Infielders: 19 Wally Backman; 3 Jay Bell; 6 Rafael Belliard; 5 Sid Bream; 51 Carlos García; 7 Jeff King; 13 José Lind; 35 Carmelo Martínez; 54 Orlando Merced; 2 Gary Redus	Outfielders: 52 Moisés Alou; 24 Barry Bonds; 25 Bobby Bonilla; 44 John Cangelosi; 42 Steve Carter; 30 Lloyd McClendon; 23 R. J. Reynolds; 27 Mark Ryal; 18 Andy Van Slyke	Manager: 10 Jim Leyland; Coaches: 45 Rich Donnelly (bullpen); 36 Bruce Kimm (bench); 32 Gene Lamont (third base); 39 Milt May (hitting); 31 Ray Miller (pitching); 37 Tommy Sandt (first base)

=== Opening Day lineup ===
Opening Day Starters
#	Name	Position
19	Wally Backman	3B
3	Jay Bell	SS
18	Andy Van Slyke	CF
25	Bobby Bonilla	RF
24	Barry Bonds	LF
5	Sid Bream	1B
12	Mike LaValliere	C
13	José Lind	2B
15	Doug Drabek	SP

== Awards and honors ==
- Barry Bonds, OF, National League Most Valuable Player Award
- Sid Bream, Hutch Award
- Sid Bream, National League Record, Most Assists in One Season,
- Doug Drabek, National League Cy Young Award
- Doug Drabek, National League Pitcher of the Month, July
- Doug Drabek, National League Pitcher of the Month, August
- Jim Leyland, National League Manager of the Year Award
- Andy Van Slyke, Outfield, Gold Glove Award

1990 Major League Baseball All-Star Game

- Barry Bonds, OF, reserve
- Bobby Bonilla, OF, reserve
- Neal Heaton, P, reserve

== Player stats ==
Batting

Note: G = Games played; AB = At bats; H = Hits; Avg. = Batting average; HR = Home runs; RBI = Runs batted in

Regular season
Player	G	AB	H	Avg.	HR	RBI
C. García	4	4	2	0.500	0	0
L. McClendon	4	3	1	0.333	1	2
S. Ruskin	44	6	2	0.333	0	1
M. York	4	3	1	0.333	0	0
B. Bonds	151	519	156	0.301	33	114
D. Slaught	84	230	69	0.300	4	29
W. Backman	104	315	92	0.292	2	28
R. Reynolds	95	215	62	0.288	0	19
A. Van Slyke	136	493	140	0.284	17	77
B. Bonilla	160	625	175	0.280	32	120
S. Bream	147	389	105	0.270	15	67
J. Lind	152	514	134	0.261	1	48
M. LaValliere	96	279	72	0.258	3	31
J. Bell	159	583	148	0.254	7	52
R. Reed	13	16	4	0.250	0	1
G. Redus	96	227	56	0.247	6	23
J. King	127	371	91	0.245	14	53
D. Drabek	33	84	18	0.214	1	6
C. Martínez	12	19	4	0.211	2	4
O. Merced	25	24	5	0.208	0	0
R. Belliard	47	54	11	0.204	0	6
M. Alou	2	5	1	0.200	0	0
S. Carter	5	5	1	0.200	0	0
J. Cangelosi	58	76	15	0.197	0	1
B. Walk	26	37	6	0.162	0	4
B. Kipper	41	7	1	0.143	0	0
Z. Smith	11	28	4	0.143	0	0
T. Power	40	8	1	0.125	0	0
J. Smiley	26	49	6	0.122	0	3
B. Landrum	54	9	1	0.111	0	0
W. Terrell	16	28	3	0.107	0	0
T. Prince	4	10	1	0.100	0	0
M. Ryal	9	12	1	0.083	0	0
D. Bilardello	19	37	2	0.054	0	3
B. Patterson	55	19	1	0.053	0	0
N. Heaton	32	43	2	0.047	0	1
R. Tomlin	12	25	1	0.040	0	0
D. Bair	22	1	0	0.000	0	0
S. Belinda	55	5	0	0.000	0	0
R. Kramer	12	5	0	0.000	0	0
V. Palacios	7	4	0	0.000	0	0
M. Roesler	5	1	0	0.000	0	0
M. Ross	9	1	0	0.000	0	0
M. Huismann	2	0	0	—	0	0
J. Reuss	4	0	0	—	0	0
J. Tibbs	5	0	0	—	0	0
Team totals	162	5,388	1,395	0.259	138	693

Postseason
Player	G	AB	H	Avg.	HR	RBI
S. Bream	4	8	4	0.500	1	3
J. Bell	6	20	5	0.250	1	1
C. Martínez	2	8	2	0.250	0	2
G. Redus	5	8	2	0.250	0	0
J. Lind	6	21	5	0.238	1	2
A. Van Slyke	6	24	5	0.208	0	3
R. Reynolds	6	10	2	0.200	0	0
B. Bonilla	6	21	4	0.190	0	1
B. Bonds	6	18	3	0.167	0	1
D. Drabek	2	6	1	0.167	0	0
W. Backman	3	7	1	0.143	0	0
J. King	5	10	1	0.100	0	0
D. Slaught	4	11	1	0.091	0	1
M. LaValliere	3	6	0	0.000	0	0
T. Power	3	1	0	0.000	0	0
Z. Smith	2	3	0	0.000	0	0
B. Walk	2	4	0	0.000	0	0
S. Belinda	3	0	0	—	0	0
B. Landrum	2	0	0	—	0	0
B. Patterson	2	0	0	—	0	0
J. Smiley	1	0	0	—	0	0
Team totals	6	186	36	.194	3	14

Pitching

Note: G = Games pitched; IP = Innings pitched; W = Wins; L = Losses; ERA = Earned run average; SO = Strikeouts

Regular season
Player	G	IP	W	L	ERA	SO
V. Palacios	7	15	0	0	0.00	8
Z. Smith	11	76	6	2	1.30	50
B. Landrum	54	71 2/3	7	3	2.13	39
R. Tomlin	12	77 2/3	4	4	2.55	42
J. Tibbs	5	7	1	0	2.57	4
D. Drabek	33	231 1/3	22	6	2.76	131
M. York	4	12 2/3	1	1	2.84	4
B. Patterson	55	94 2/3	8	5	2.95	70
M. Roesler	5	6	1	0	3.00	4
B. Kipper	41	62 2/3	5	2	3.02	35
S. Ruskin	44	47 2/3	2	2	3.02	34
N. Heaton	30	146	12	9	3.45	68
J. Reuss	4	7 2/3	0	0	3.52	1
S. Belinda	55	58 1/3	3	4	3.55	55
M. Ross	9	12 2/3	1	0	3.55	5
T. Power	40	51 2/3	1	3	3.66	42
B. Walk	26	129 2/3	7	5	3.75	73
R. Reed	13	53 2/3	2	3	4.36	27
J. Smiley	26	149 1/3	9	10	4.64	86
D. Bair	22	24 1/3	0	0	4.81	19
R. Kramer	12	25 2/3	0	1	4.91	15
W. Terrell	16	82 2/3	2	7	5.88	34
M. Huismann	2	3	1	0	9.00	2
Team totals	162	1447	95	67	3.40	848

Postseason
Player	G	IP	W	L	ERA	SO
B. Landrum	2	2	0	0	0.00	1
B. Patterson	2	1	0	0	0.00	0
J. Smiley	1	2	0	0	0.00	0
D. Drabek	2	16 1/3	1	1	1.65	13
S. Belinda	3	3 2/3	0	0	2.45	4
T. Power	3	5	0	0	3.60	3
B. Walk	2	13	1	1	4.85	8
Z. Smith	2	9	0	2	6.00	8
Team totals	6	52	2	4	3.29	37

== Notable transactions ==
- May 2, 1990: Rico Rossy was traded by the Pirates to the Atlanta Braves for Greg Tubbs.
- May 18, 1990: Roger Mason was signed as a free agent with the Pittsburgh Pirates.
- June 5, 1990: The Pirates traded a player to be named later to the Baltimore Orioles for Jay Tibbs. The Pirates completed the deal by sending Dorn Taylor to the Orioles on September 5.
- August 8, 1990: Scott Ruskin, Willie Greene and a player to be named later were traded by the Pirates to the Montreal Expos for Zane Smith. The Pirates completed the trade by sending Moisés Alou to the Expos on August 16.
- September 1, 1990: Randy Kramer was traded by the Pirates to the Chicago Cubs for Greg Kallevig (minors).

== Farm system ==
Level	Team	League	Manager
AAA	Buffalo Bisons	American Association	Terry Collins
AA	Harrisburg Senators	Eastern League	Marc Bombard
A	Salem Buccaneers	Carolina League	Stan Cliburn
A	Augusta Pirates	South Atlantic League	Lee Driggers
A-Short Season	Welland Pirates	New York–Penn League	Jim Mallon
Rookie	GCL Pirates	Gulf Coast League	Julio Garcia
Rookie	DSL Pirates	Dominican Summer League	--

LEAGUE CHAMPIONS: DSL Pirates
