= 1990 Philadelphia Phillies season =

1990 Philadelphia Phillies
- League: National League
- Division: East
- Ballpark: Veterans Stadium
- City: Philadelphia
- Owners: Bill Giles
- General managers: Lee Thomas
- Managers: Nick Leyva
- Television: WTXF-TV (Harry Kalas, Chris Wheeler, Andy Musser); PRISM (Jim Barniak, Mike Schmidt, Garry Maddox); SportsChannel Philadelphia (Chris Wheeler, Andy Musser)
- Radio: WCAU (Harry Kalas, Richie Ashburn, Andy Musser, Chris Wheeler)

The 1990 Philadelphia Phillies season was the 108th season in the history of the franchise, and the 20th season for the Philadelphia Phillies at Veterans Stadium.

== Offseason ==
- October 11, 1989: Steve Stanicek was released by the Phillies.
- December 4, 1989: Rule 5 draft
  - Sil Campusano was drafted by the Phillies from the Toronto Blue Jays.
  - Gordon Dillard was drafted from the Phillies by the Pittsburgh Pirates.
- December 6, 1989: Steve Lake was signed as a free agent by the Phillies.
- March 31, 1990: Steve Jeltz was traded by the Phillies to the Kansas City Royals for José DeJesús.

== Regular season ==
**Mike**
**Schmidt**
3B
Retired 1990

Terry Mulholland pitched the eighth no-hitter of the 1990 season on August 15 as the Phillies beat the San Francisco Giants, 6–0. The season's eighth no-hitter surpassed the modern record of seven set in 1917 and 1908. Mulholland's no-hitter was the first in the 20th century by a Phillies' pitcher in Philadelphia, and was also the first nine-inning no-hitter pitched at Veterans Stadium. The game was played in two hours and nine minutes and attendance was 32,156.

=== Season standings ===
NL East
Team	W	L	Pct.	GB	Home	Road
Pittsburgh Pirates	95	67	.586	—	49‍–‍32	46‍–‍35
New York Mets	91	71	.562	4	52‍–‍29	39‍–‍42
Montreal Expos	85	77	.525	10	47‍–‍34	38‍–‍43
Chicago Cubs	77	85	.475	18	39‍–‍42	38‍–‍43
Philadelphia Phillies	77	85	.475	18	41‍–‍40	36‍–‍45
St. Louis Cardinals	70	92	.432	25	34‍–‍47	36‍–‍45

=== Record vs. opponents ===
1990 National League record Sources:
Team	ATL	CHC	CIN	HOU	LAD	MON	NYM	PHI	PIT	SD	SF	STL
Atlanta	—	6–6	8–10	5–13	6–12	6–6	4–8	5–7	5–7	8–10	5–13	7–5
Chicago	6–6	—	4–8	6–6	3–9	11–7	9–9	11–7	4–14	8–4	7–5	8–10
Cincinnati	10–8	8–4	—	11–7	9–9	9–3	6–6	7–5	6–6	9–9	7–11	9–3
Houston	13–5	6–6	7–11	—	9–9	5–7	5–7	5–7	5–7	4–14	10–8	6–6
Los Angeles	12–6	9–3	9–9	9–9	—	6–6	5–7	8–4	4–8	9–9	8–10	7–5
Montreal	6–6	7–11	3–9	7–5	6–6	—	8–10	10–8	13–5	7–5	7–5	11–7
New York	8–4	9–9	6–6	7–5	7–5	10–8	—	10–8	10–8	5–7	7–5	12–6
Philadelphia	7-5	7–11	5–7	7–5	4–8	8–10	8–10	—	6–12	7–5	8–4	10–8
Pittsburgh	7–5	14–4	6–6	7–5	8–4	5–13	8–10	12–6	—	10–2	8–4	10–8
San Diego	10–8	4–8	9–9	14–4	9–9	5–7	7–5	5–7	2–10	—	7–11	3–9
San Francisco	13–5	5–7	11–7	8–10	10–8	5–7	5–7	4–8	4–8	11–7	—	9–3
St. Louis	5–7	10–8	3–9	6–6	5–7	7–11	6–12	8–10	8–10	9–3	3–9	—

=== Notable transactions ===
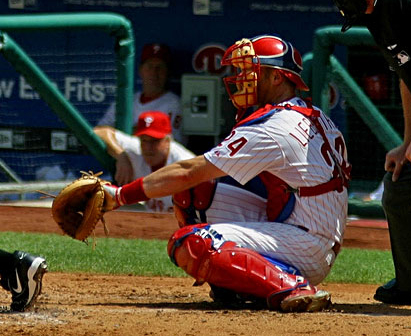
Mike Lieberthal

- April 6, 1990: Dickie Noles was signed as a free agent by the Phillies.
- June 4, 1990: 1990 Major League Baseball draft
  - Mike Lieberthal was drafted by the Phillies in the 1st round.
  - Marvin Benard was drafted by the Phillies in the 20th round, but did not sign.
- July 23, 1990: Marvin Freeman was traded by the Phillies to the Atlanta Braves for Joe Boever.
- August 3, 1990: Jeff Parrett and players to be named later were traded by the Phillies to the Atlanta Braves for Dale Murphy and a player to be named later. The Braves completed their part of the deal by sending Tommy Greene to the Phillies on August 9. The Phillies completed the deal by sending Jim Vatcher to the Braves on August 9 and Víctor Rosario to the Braves on September 4.

=== 1990 Game Log ===
Legend
	Phillies win
	Phillies loss
	Postponement
**Bold**	Phillies team member

1990 Game Log
Overall Record: 77–85
April (10–9)

#	Date	Opponent	Score	Win	Loss	Save	Attendance	Record
1	April 10	@ Cubs	1–2	Les Lancaster (1–0)	**Jeff Parrett** (0–1)	Mitch Williams (1)	7,791	0–1
–	April 11	@ Cubs	Postponed (rain); Makeup: April 12 as a traditional double-header					
2	April 12 (1)	@ Cubs	5–4	**Terry Mulholland** (1–0)	Steve Wilson (0–1)	**Roger McDowell** (1)	see 2nd game	1–1
3	April 12 (2)	@ Cubs	3–6	José Núñez (1–0)	**Pat Combs** (0–1)	Mitch Williams (2)	7,717	1–2
4	April 13	Cardinals	0–11	John Tudor (1–0)	**Ken Howell** (0–1)	Bob Tewksbury (1)	32,173	1–3
5	April 14	Cardinals	6–2	**Bruce Ruffin** (1–0)	Joe Magrane (0–1)	**Jeff Parrett** (1)	15,613	2–3
6	April 15	Cardinals	4–0	**Dennis Cook** (1–0)	Bryn Smith (1–1)	**Roger McDowell** (2)	14,435	3–3
7	April 16	@ Expos	4–5	Joe Hesketh (1–0)	**Jeff Parrett** (0–2)	Steve Frey (2)	11,063	3–4
8	April 17	@ Expos	1–2	Drew Hall (1–1)	**Todd Frohwirth** (0–1)	Steve Frey (3)	8,406	3–5
9	April 18	@ Expos	4–3	**Ken Howell** (1–1)	Kevin Gross (0–1)	**Roger McDowell** (3)	10,096	4–5
10	April 19	Expos	0–5	Dennis Martínez (2–0)	**Bruce Ruffin** (1–1)	None	8,417	4–6
11	April 20	@ Cardinals	3–0	**Dennis Cook** (2–0)	Bryn Smith (1–2)	None	29,343	5–6
12	April 21	@ Cardinals	7–6 (10)	**Roger McDowell** (1–0)	Scott Terry (0–1)	None	39,798	6–6
13	April 22	@ Cardinals	5–3	**Pat Combs** (1–1)	Ricky Horton (0–1)	**Roger McDowell** (4)	36,819	7–6
14	April 24	Reds	6–3	**Ken Howell** (2–1)	José Rijo (0–1)	**Roger McDowell** (5)	19,161	8–6
15	April 25	Reds	7–12	Rick Mahler (1–0)	**Bruce Ruffin** (1–2)	None	18,497	8–7
16	April 27	@ Braves	7–1	**Dennis Cook** (3–0)	Mike Stanton (0–3)	None	12,598	9–7
17	April 28	@ Braves	2–1	**Jeff Parrett** (1–2)	Joe Boever (0–1)	**Roger McDowell** (6)	12,659	10–7
18	April 29	@ Braves	1–3	Pete Smith (2–1)	**Pat Combs** (1–2)	None	11,966	10–8
19	April 30	@ Reds	2–6	José Rijo (1–1)	**Ken Howell** (2–2)	Rob Dibble (3)	17,294	10–9

May (14–11)

#	Date	Opponent	Score	Win	Loss	Save	Attendance	Record
20	May 1	@ Reds	4–2	**Bruce Ruffin** (2–2)	Tim Birtsas (1–1)	**Roger McDowell** (7)	16,926	11–9
21	May 2	Astros	14–4	**Dennis Cook** (4–0)	Jim Clancy (1–1)	None	15,196	12–9
22	May 3	Astros	3–10	Bill Gullickson (2–1)	**Terry Mulholland** (1–1)	Dave Smith (8)	13,653	12–10
23	May 4	Dodgers	8–3	**Don Carman** (1–0)	Ramón Martínez (2–1)	None	8,926	13–10
24	May 5	Dodgers	0–3	Mike Morgan (4–1)	**Ken Howell** (2–3)	None	25,290	13–11
25	May 6	Dodgers	9–5	**Don Carman** (2–0)	Mike Munoz (0–1)	None	38,167	14–11
26	May 8	@ Astros	2–3 (10)	Dave Smith (1–2)	**Dickie Noles** (0–1)	None	12,909	14–12
27	May 9	@ Astros	10–1	**Pat Combs** (2–2)	Mike Scott (1–3)	None	11,257	15–12
28	May 11	Giants	10–6	**Ken Howell** (3–3)	John Burkett (2–1)	None	26,750	16–12
29	May 12	Giants	2–6	Scott Garrelts (1–3)	**Bruce Ruffin** (2–3)	Jeff Brantley (3)	24,272	16–13
30	May 13	Giants	4–1	**Dennis Cook** (5–0)	Rick Reuschel (2–4)	None	19,631	17–13
31	May 14	@ Padres	1–5	Andy Benes (3–3)	**Pat Combs** (2–3)	None	16,389	17–14
32	May 15	@ Padres	2–1	**Terry Mulholland** (2–1)	Dennis Rasmussen (3–2)	**Roger McDowell** (8)	22,596	18–14
33	May 16	@ Padres	6–5	**Ken Howell** (4–3)	Ed Whitson (3–2)	**Roger McDowell** (9)	17,710	19–14
34	May 18	@ Dodgers	2–4	Tim Belcher (3–3)	**Bruce Ruffin** (2–4)	Jay Howell (1)	34,274	19–15
35	May 19	@ Dodgers	15–12 (11)	**Roger McDowell** (2–0)	Jay Howell (1–2)	None	44,703	20–15
36	May 20	@ Dodgers	3–6	Ramón Martínez (4–2)	**Pat Combs** (2–4)	Mike Hartley (1)	45,770	20–16
37	May 21	@ Giants	5–2	**Terry Mulholland** (3–1)	Scott Garrelts (1–4)	**Roger McDowell** (10)	11,263	21–16
38	May 22	@ Giants	4–2	**Ken Howell** (5–3)	Rick Reuschel (2–5)	**Roger McDowell** (11)	8,799	22–16
39	May 24	Braves	8–4	**Bruce Ruffin** (3–4)	Marty Clary (1–3)	**Marvin Freeman** (1)	21,160	23–16
40	May 25	Braves	5–4	**Jeff Parrett** (2–2)	Joe Hesketh (1–1)	**Roger McDowell** (12)	22,162	24–16
41	May 26	Braves	3–12	Pete Smith (4–3)	**Pat Combs** (2–5)	None	56,789	24–17
42	May 27	Braves	1–6	John Smoltz (3–4)	**Terry Mulholland** (3–2)	None	27,139	24–18
43	May 28	Padres	5–9	Mark Grant (1–0)	**Jeff Parrett** (2–3)	None	18,390	24–19
–	May 29	Padres	Postponed (rain); Makeup: September 1 as a traditional double-header					
44	May 30	Padres	3–8	Andy Benes (5–4)	**Bruce Ruffin** (3–5)	Greg W. Harris (2)	21,375	24–20

June (11–17)

#	Date	Opponent	Score	Win	Loss	Save	Attendance	Record
45	June 1	Mets	0–4	Frank Viola (8–2)	**Dennis Cook** (5–1)	None	34,457	24–21
46	June 2	Mets	5–4	**Ken Howell** (6–3)	Dwight Gooden (3–5)	**Roger McDowell** (13)	41,950	25–21
47	June 3	Mets	8–3	**Pat Combs** (3–5)	Sid Fernandez (3–5)	None	43,643	26–21
48	June 4	@ Cardinals	2–3 (11)	Frank DiPino (2–0)	**Marvin Freeman** (0–1)	None	29,937	26–22
49	June 5	@ Cardinals	9–6	**Don Carman** (3–0)	Scott Terry (0–4)	None	26,522	27–22
50	June 6	@ Cardinals	11–12 (10)	Frank DiPino (3–0)	**Roger McDowell** (2–1)	None	28,319	27–23
51	June 7	@ Cubs	3–1	**Ken Howell** (7–3)	Mike Bielecki (3–4)	None	29,271	28–23
52	June 8	@ Cubs	2–15	Jeff Pico (2–0)	**Terry Mulholland** (3–3)	None	32,219	28–24
53	June 9	@ Cubs	3–4 (11)	Les Lancaster (5–2)	**Jeff Parrett** (2–4)	None	33,266	28–25
54	June 10	@ Cubs	3–7	Steve Wilson (1–4)	**Bruce Ruffin** (3–6)	Les Lancaster (2)	32,187	28–26
55	June 11 (1)	Expos	0–5	Kevin Gross (8–4)	**Dennis Cook** (5–2)	None	see 2nd game	28–27
56	June 11 (2)	Expos	2–3	Drew Hall (4–6)	**Jeff Parrett** (2–5)	Dave Schmidt (5)	22,700	28–28
57	June 12	Expos	7–2	**Ken Howell** (8–3)	Zane Smith (3–4)	None	19,169	29–28
58	June 13	Expos	3–4 (10)	Dave Schmidt (2–0)	**Roger McDowell** (2–2)	Drew Hall (3)	18,655	29–29
–	June 14	Cubs	Postponed (rain); Makeup: June 15 as a traditional double-header					
59	June 15 (1)	Cubs	6–5 (10)	**Darrel Akerfelds** (1–0)	José Núñez (1–5)	None	see 2nd game	30–29
60	June 15 (2)	Cubs	7–0	**Bruce Ruffin** (4–6)	Mike Bielecki (3–6)	None	26,098	31–29
61	June 16	Cubs	2–1	**Darrel Akerfelds** (2–0)	Greg Maddux (4–7)	None	32,023	32–29
62	June 17	Cubs	3–5	Jeff Pico (3–0)	**Jeff Parrett** (2–6)	Les Lancaster (3)	30,338	32–30
–	June 18	Pirates	Postponed (rain); Makeup: August 6 as a traditional double-header					
63	June 19	Pirates	2–1 (10)	**Don Carman** (4–0)	Bill Landrum (2–1)	None	29,781	33–30
64	June 20	Pirates	7–2	**Bruce Ruffin** (5–6)	Bob Patterson (4–3)	None	40,256	34–30
65	June 22	@ Mets	1–5	Frank Viola (10–3)	**Ken Howell** (8–4)	None	43,587	34–31
66	June 23	@ Mets	0–3	Dwight Gooden (6–5)	**Pat Combs** (3–6)	None	45,661	34–32
67	June 24	@ Mets	5–6	Jeff Innis (1–1)	**Roger McDowell** (2–3)	None	47,836	34–33
68	June 25	@ Pirates	0–5	Rick Reed (1–0)	**José DeJesús** (0–1)	None	29,369	34–34
69	June 26	@ Pirates	0–1	Scott Ruskin (2–1)	**Bruce Ruffin** (5–7)	Stan Belinda (2)	25,807	34–35
70	June 27	@ Pirates	3–5	Bob Kipper (2–1)	**Ken Howell** (8–5)	Bill Landrum (11)	40,207	34–36
71	June 29	Astros	2–0	**Pat Combs** (4–6)	Bill Gullickson (5–6)	None	26,339	35–36
72	June 30	Astros	3–8	Mike Scott (6–7)	**Marvin Freeman** (0–2)	Juan Agosto (1)	27,111	35–37

July (14–13)

#	Date	Opponent	Score	Win	Loss	Save	Attendance	Record
73	July 1	Astros	8–4	**Roger McDowell** (3–3)	Larry Andersen (4–2)	None	27,014	36–37
74	July 2	Astros	5–1	**Bruce Ruffin** (6–7)	Jim Deshaies (4–6)	**Darrel Akerfelds** (1)	32,349	37–37
75	July 3	Braves	5–1	**Jeff Parrett** (3–6)	Marty Clary (1–4)	**Dennis Cook** (1)	55,147	38–37
76	July 4	Braves	1–4	Tom Glavine (5–5)	**Pat Combs** (4–7)	Joe Boever (8)	18,286	38–38
77	July 5	Reds	2–9	Jack Armstrong (11–3)	**Ken Howell** (8–6)	None	19,961	38–39
78	July 6	Reds	1–4	Danny Jackson (3–2)	**José DeJesús** (0–2)	Randy Myers (17)	28,501	38–40
79	July 7	Reds	0–5	Rick Mahler (3–3)	**Bruce Ruffin** (6–8)	None	29,515	38–41
80	July 8	Reds	4–3	**Darrel Akerfelds** (3–0)	Norm Charlton (6–3)	None	31,602	39–41
–	July 10	**1990 Major League Baseball All-Star Game at Wrigley Field in Chicago**						
81	July 12	@ Astros	4–7	Bill Gullickson (6–6)	**Bruce Ruffin** (6–9)	Dave Smith (17)	16,983	39–42
82	July 13	@ Astros	4–2	**José DeJesús** (1–2)	Mike Scott (6–9)	**Darrel Akerfelds** (2)	15,248	40–42
83	July 14	@ Astros	12–8	**Pat Combs** (5–7)	Jim Deshaies (4–8)	None	28,308	41–42
84	July 15	@ Astros	1–6	Danny Darwin (3–1)	**Jeff Parrett** (3–7)	None	19,616	41–43
85	July 16	@ Braves	7–2	**Terry Mulholland** (4–3)	Marty Clary (1–6)	None	8,211	42–43
86	July 17	@ Braves	10–14	Tom Glavine (6–6)	**Bruce Ruffin** (6–10)	Kent Mercker (1)	8,558	42–44
87	July 18	@ Braves	4–3	**Dennis Cook** (6–2)	John Smoltz (6–7)	**Darrel Akerfelds** (3)	8,706	43–44
88	July 19	@ Reds	5–2	**Pat Combs** (6–7)	Jack Armstrong (11–5)	**Roger McDowell** (14)	37,163	44–44
89	July 20	@ Reds	1–5	Norm Charlton (8–4)	**Jeff Parrett** (3–8)	Rob Dibble (8)	39,394	44–45
90	July 21	@ Reds	1–6	José Rijo (6–3)	**Terry Mulholland** (4–4)	Rick Mahler (2)	34,506	44–46
91	July 22	@ Reds	6–2	**José DeJesús** (2–2)	Scott Scudder (2–3)	None	33,658	45–46
92	July 23	Mets	7–4	**Darrel Akerfelds** (4–0)	Frank Viola (13–5)	**Roger McDowell** (15)	39,260	46–46
93	July 24	Mets	4–7	Julio Machado (3–1)	**Roger McDowell** (3–4)	John Franco (22)	43,235	46–47
94	July 25	Mets	9–10	Sid Fernandez (7–6)	**Jeff Parrett** (3–9)	John Franco (23)	40,079	46–48
95	July 26	@ Pirates	12–4	**Terry Mulholland** (5–4)	Neal Heaton (10–7)	None	24,088	47–48
96	July 27	@ Pirates	5–3	**Dennis Cook** (7–2)	Rick Reed (2–2)	**Joe Boever** (9)	29,117	48–48
97	July 28	@ Pirates	4–3	**Jeff Parrett** (4–9)	Bill Landrum (3–2)	**Joe Boever** (10)	37,022	49–48
98	July 29	@ Pirates	1–2	Doug Drabek (13–4)	**Pat Combs** (6–8)	None	33,018	49–49
99	July 31	Cardinals	2–4	John Tudor (10–3)	**Ken Howell** (8–7)	Lee Smith (21)	25,463	49–50

August (11–19)

#	Date	Opponent	Score	Win	Loss	Save	Attendance	Record
100	August 1	Cardinals	11–10	**Terry Mulholland** (6–4)	Ken Hill (1–1)	**Roger McDowell** (16)	23,142	50–50
101	August 2	Cardinals	3–4	Bob Tewksbury (6–3)	**José DeJesús** (2–3)	Lee Smith (22)	21,898	50–51
102	August 3	Pirates	0–11	Doug Drabek (14–4)	**Bruce Ruffin** (6–11)	None	36,057	50–52
103	August 4	Pirates	1–3 (10)	Bob Patterson (8–3)	**Roger McDowell** (3–5)	Ted Power (6)	45,305	50–53
104	August 5	Pirates	8–6	**Don Carman** (5–0)	Scott Ruskin (2–2)	**Joe Boever** (11)	40,142	51–53
105	August 6 (1)	Pirates	1–10	Randy Tomlin (1–0)	**Terry Mulholland** (6–5)	None	see 2nd game	51–54
106	August 6 (2)	Pirates	3–4 (10)	Bill Landrum (4–2)	**Roger McDowell** (3–6)	None	30,827	51–55
107	August 7	@ Mets	9–0	**José DeJesús** (3–3)	Frank Viola (15–6)	None	33,120	52–55
108	August 8	@ Mets	4–8	David Cone (8–5)	**Don Carman** (5–1)	None	41,204	52–56
109	August 9	@ Mets	4–5	Bob Ojeda (6–5)	**Darrel Akerfelds** (4–1)	John Franco (25)	39,240	52–57
110	August 10	@ Expos	3–4	Oil Can Boyd (7–4)	**Terry Mulholland** (6–6)	Steve Frey (5)	17,904	52–58
111	August 11	@ Expos	4–5 (12)	Bill Sampen (9–4)	**Don Carman** (5–2)	None	23,708	52–59
112	August 12	@ Expos	3–6	Chris Nabholz (1–0)	**José DeJesús** (3–4)	Tim Burke (14)	29,186	52–60
113	August 14	Giants	4–3 (13)	**Dennis Cook** (8–2)	Steve Bedrosian (5–7)	None	29,538	53–60
114	August 15	Giants	6–0	**Terry Mulholland** (7–6)	Don Robinson (8–4)	None	32,156	54–60
115	August 16	Giants	6–4	**Roger McDowell** (4–6)	Mark Thurmond (2–3)	None	37,340	55–60
116	August 17	@ Padres	2–1	**José DeJesús** (4–4)	Calvin Schiraldi (3–5)	None	18,488	56–60
117	August 18	@ Padres	2–4	Andy Benes (9–8)	**Tommy Greene** (1–1)	Craig Lefferts (19)	35,145	56–61
118	August 19	@ Padres	3–2	**Joe Boever** (2–3)	Dennis Rasmussen (8–12)	**Roger McDowell** (17)	22,627	57–61
119	August 20	@ Dodgers	1–2	Jim Gott (1–2)	**Terry Mulholland** (7–7)	None	28,112	57–62
120	August 21	@ Dodgers	12–11	**Roger McDowell** (5–6)	Tim Crews (1–4)	**Don Carman** (1)	39,682	58–62
121	August 22	@ Dodgers	2–3	Jim Gott (2–2)	**Joe Boever** (2–4)	None	27,934	58–63
122	August 23	@ Giants	3–6	Francisco Oliveras (1–2)	**Dennis Cook** (8–3)	Steve Bedrosian (9)	13,918	58–64
123	August 24	@ Giants	2–13	Mike LaCoss (4–2)	**Pat Combs** (6–9)	None	15,961	58–65
124	August 25	@ Giants	2–4	Don Robinson (10–4)	**Terry Mulholland** (7–8)	Jeff Brantley (18)	28,208	58–66
125	August 26	@ Giants	5–1	**Jason Grimsley** (1–0)	John Burkett (11–5)	None	30,208	59–66
126	August 28	Dodgers	1–5	Jim Neidlinger (3–1)	**José DeJesús** (4–5)	None	24,296	59–67
127	August 29	Dodgers	2–12	Fernando Valenzuela (12–10)	**Tommy Greene** (1–2)	Tim Crews (5)	18,545	59–68
128	August 30	Dodgers	2–3	Ramón Martínez (16–6)	**Joe Boever** (2–5)	Dave Walsh (1)	24,160	59–69
129	August 31	Padres	4–2	**Roger McDowell** (6–6)	Atlee Hammaker (4–6)	None	23,286	60–69

September (16–14)

#	Date	Opponent	Score	Win	Loss	Save	Attendance	Record
130	September 1 (1)	Padres	3–2 (10)	**Joe Boever** (3–5)	Greg W. Harris (7–7)	None	see 2nd game	61–69
131	September 1 (2)	Padres	2–1	**Darrel Akerfelds** (5–1)	Rich Rodriguez (1–1)	**Roger McDowell** (18)	25,008	62–69
132	September 2	Padres	1–9	Ed Whitson (12–7)	**José DeJesús** (4–6)	None	33,498	62–70
133	September 3	@ Pirates	1–4	Doug Drabek (18–5)	**Bruce Ruffin** (6–12)	None	23,854	62–71
134	September 4	@ Pirates	7–11	Bill Landrum (5–3)	**Darrel Akerfelds** (5–2)	Bob Patterson (4)	16,858	62–72
135	September 5	Cubs	4–1	**Terry Mulholland** (8–8)	Steve Wilson (4–8)	**Roger McDowell** (19)	16,177	63–72
136	September 6	Cubs	2–5	José Núñez (2–6)	**Jason Grimsley** (1–1)	Mitch Williams (14)	13,849	63–73
137	September 7	Mets	4–1	**José DeJesús** (5–6)	David Cone (11–8)	None	29,744	64–73
138	September 8	Mets	2–12	Dwight Gooden (16–6)	**Bruce Ruffin** (6–13)	None	37,489	64–74
139	September 9	Mets	6–2	**Pat Combs** (7–9)	Sid Fernandez (9–12)	**Joe Boever** (12)	36,502	65–74
140	September 10	Pirates	2–3	Stan Belinda (3–4)	**Joe Boever** (3–6)	None	18,970	65–75
141	September 11	Pirates	1–5	Randy Tomlin (3–2)	**Jason Grimsley** (1–2)	None	20,289	65–76
142	September 12	@ Cubs	3–9	Greg Maddux (13–13)	**José DeJesús** (5–7)	None	16,258	65–77
143	September 13	@ Cubs	5–6	Paul Assenmacher (5–2)	**Roger McDowell** (6–7)	Les Lancaster (6)	15,495	65–78
144	September 14	@ Mets	4–1	**Pat Combs** (8–9)	Sid Fernandez (9–13)	None	36,339	66–78
145	September 15	@ Mets	2–4	Frank Viola (19–9)	**Terry Mulholland** (8–9)	John Franco (33)	45,202	66–79
146	September 16	@ Mets	8–3	**José DeJesús** (6–7)	David Cone (12–9)	None	44,813	67–79
147	September 18	@ Cardinals	6–3	**Jason Grimsley** (2–2)	Bob Tewksbury (10–7)	**Joe Boever** (13)	15,588	68–79
148	September 19	@ Cardinals	8–4	**Pat Combs** (9–9)	Joe Magrane (9–16)	None	15,828	69–79
149	September 20	@ Cardinals	4–5	Mike Pérez (1–0)	**Roger McDowell** (6–8)	None	14,744	69–80
150	September 21	Expos	5–4 (12)	**Chuck Malone** (1–0)	Bill Sampen (11–7)	None	23,274	70–80
151	September 22	Expos	3–2	**Tommy Greene** (2–2)	Scott Anderson (0–1)	**Roger McDowell** (20)	17,215	71–80
152	September 23	Expos	2–1 (16)	**Don Carman** (6–2)	Howard Farmer (0–3)	None	25,715	72–80
153	September 24	Expos	3–0	**Pat Combs** (10–9)	Brian Barnes (0–1)	None	11,527	73–80
154	September 25	Cardinals	0–1	Joe Magrane (10–16)	**Terry Mulholland** (8–10)	Ken Dayley (2)	13,615	73–81
155	September 26	Cardinals	1–8	Bryn Smith (9–8)	**José DeJesús** (6–8)	None	12,443	73–82
156	September 27	Cardinals	4–3	**Tommy Greene** (3–2)	José DeLeón (7–19)	**Joe Boever** (14)	9,119	74–82
157	September 28	@ Expos	5–4	**Jason Grimsley** (3–2)	Oil Can Boyd (10–6)	**Roger McDowell** (21)	8,230	75–82
158	September 29	@ Expos	1–5	Brian Barnes (1–1)	**Pat Combs** (10–10)	None	8,985	75–83
159	September 30	@ Expos	2–1	**Terry Mulholland** (9–10)	Chris Nabholz (6–2)	None	17,464	76–83

October (1–2)

#	Date	Opponent	Score	Win	Loss	Save	Attendance	Record
160	October 1	Cubs	7–6	**José DeJesús** (7–8)	Kevin Coffman (0–2)	**Roger McDowell** (22)	9,041	77–83
161	October 2	Cubs	1–3	Mike Bielecki (8–11)	**Tommy Greene** (3–3)	Mitch Williams (16)	9,940	77–84
162	October 3	Cubs	3–4	Greg Maddux (15–15)	**Chuck McElroy** (0–1)	Paul Assenmacher (10)	11,889	77–85

=== Roster ===
1990 Philadelphia Phillies
**Roster**
**Pitchers**: 35 Darrel Akerfelds; 30 Joe Boever; 42 Don Carman; 38 Pat Combs; 39 Dennis Cook; 54 José DeJesús; 48 Marvin Freeman; 52 Todd Frohwirth; 49 Tommy Greene; 54 Jason Grimsley; 43 Ken Howell; 53 Chuck Malone; 13 Roger McDowell; 51 Chuck McElroy; 46 Brad Moore; 45 Terry Mulholland; 34 Dickie Noles; 41 Steve Ontiveros; 49 Jeff Parrett; 47 Bruce Ruffin	**Catchers**: 10 Darren Daulton; 24 Darrin Fletcher; 25 Steve Lake; 11 Tom Nieto; **Infielders**: 37 Rod Booker; 8 Charlie Hayes; 28 Tom Herr; 15 Dave Hollins; 17 Ricky Jordan; 24 Carmelo Martínez; 12 Mickey Morandini; 21 Dickie Thon	**Outfielders**: 6 Sil Campusano; 31 Wes Chamberlain; 4 Lenny Dykstra; 27 Curt Ford; 9 Von Hayes; 26 Ron Jones; 11,19 John Kruk; 29 Louie Meadows; 3 Dale Murphy; 23 Randy Ready; 31 Jim Vatcher	**Manager**: 16 Nick Leyva; **Coaches**: 2 Larry Bowa (third base); 3 Darold Knowles (pitching); 22 Hal Lanier (first base); 14 Denis Menke (hitting); 18 John Vukovich (bench); 5 Mike Ryan (bullpen)

== Player stats ==
=== Batting ===
==== Starters by position ====
Note: Pos = Position; G = Games played; AB = At bats; H = Hits; Avg. = Batting average; HR = Home runs; RBI = Runs batted in

Pos	Player	G	AB	H	Avg.	HR	RBI
C	Darren Daulton	143	459	123	.268	12	57
1B	Ricky Jordan	92	324	78	.241	5	44
2B	Tom Herr	119	447	118	.264	4	50
SS	Dickie Thon	149	552	141	.255	8	48
3B	Charlie Hayes	152	561	145	.258	10	57
LF	John Kruk	142	443	129	.291	7	67
CF	Lenny Dykstra	149	590	192	.325	9	60
RF	Von Hayes	129	467	122	.261	17	73

==== Other batters ====
Note: G = Games played; AB = At bats; H = Hits; Avg. = Batting average; HR = Home runs; RBI = Runs batted in

Player	G	AB	H	Avg.	HR	RBI
Randy Ready	101	217	53	.244	1	26
Dale Murphy	57	214	57	.266	7	28
Carmelo Martínez	71	198	48	.242	8	31
Rod Booker	73	131	29	.221	0	10
Dave Hollins	72	114	21	.184	5	15
Sil Campusano	66	85	18	.212	2	9
Steve Lake	29	80	20	.250	0	6
Mickey Morandini	25	79	19	.241	1	3
Ron Jones	24	58	16	.276	3	7
Jim Vatcher	36	46	12	.261	1	4
Wes Chamberlain	18	46	13	.283	2	4
Tom Nieto	17	30	5	.167	0	4
Darrin Fletcher	9	22	3	.136	0	1
Curt Ford	22	18	2	.111	0	0
Louie Meadows	15	14	1	.071	0	0

=== Pitching ===
==== Starting pitchers ====
Note: G = Games pitched; IP = Innings pitched; W = Wins; L = Losses; ERA = Earned run average; SO = Strikeouts

Player	G	IP	W	L	ERA	SO
Pat Combs	32	183.1	10	10	4.07	108
Terry Mulholland	33	180.2	9	10	3.34	75
Bruce Ruffin	32	149.0	6	13	5.38	79
José DeJesús	22	130.0	7	8	3.74	87
Ken Howell	18	106.2	8	7	4.64	70
Jason Grimsley	11	57.1	3	2	3.30	41

==== Other pitchers ====
Note: G = Games pitched; IP = Innings pitched; W = Wins; L = Losses; ERA = Earned run average; SO = Strikeouts

Player	G	IP	W	L	ERA	SO
Dennis Cook	42	141.2	8	3	3.56	58
Tommy Greene	10	39.0	2	3	4.15	17
Marvin Freeman	16	32.1	0	2	5.57	26

==== Relief pitchers ====
Note: G = Games pitched; W = Wins; L = Losses; SV = Saves; ERA = Earned run average; SO = Strikeouts

Player	G	W	L	SV	ERA	SO
Roger McDowell	72	6	8	22	3.86	39
Darrel Akerfelds	71	5	2	3	3.77	42
Don Carman	59	6	2	1	4.15	58
Jeff Parrett	47	4	9	1	5.18	69
Joe Boever	34	2	3	6	2.15	40
Chuck McElroy	16	0	1	0	7.71	16
Chuck Malone	7	1	0	0	3.68	7
Steve Ontiveros	5	0	0	0	2.70	6
Todd Frohwirth	5	0	1	0	18.00	1
Brad Moore	3	0	0	0	3.38	1
Dickie Noles	1	0	1	0	27.00	0

== Farm system ==
Level	Team	League	Manager
AAA	Scranton/Wilkes-Barre; Red Barons	International League	Bill Dancy
AA	Reading Phillies	Eastern League	Don McCormack
A	Clearwater Phillies	Florida State League	Lee Elia
A	Spartanburg Phillies	South Atlantic League	Mel Roberts
A-Short Season	Batavia Clippers	New York–Penn League	Dave Cash, Tony Scott and Ramón Avilés
Rookie	Martinsville Phillies	Appalachian League	Roly de Armas
