= Chuck Malone (disambiguation) =

Chuck Malone may refer to:

- Charles R. "Chuck" Malone (c. 1954), American jurist
- Chuck Malone (born 1965), American baseball player
