= Aaron Nola =

American baseball player (born 1993)

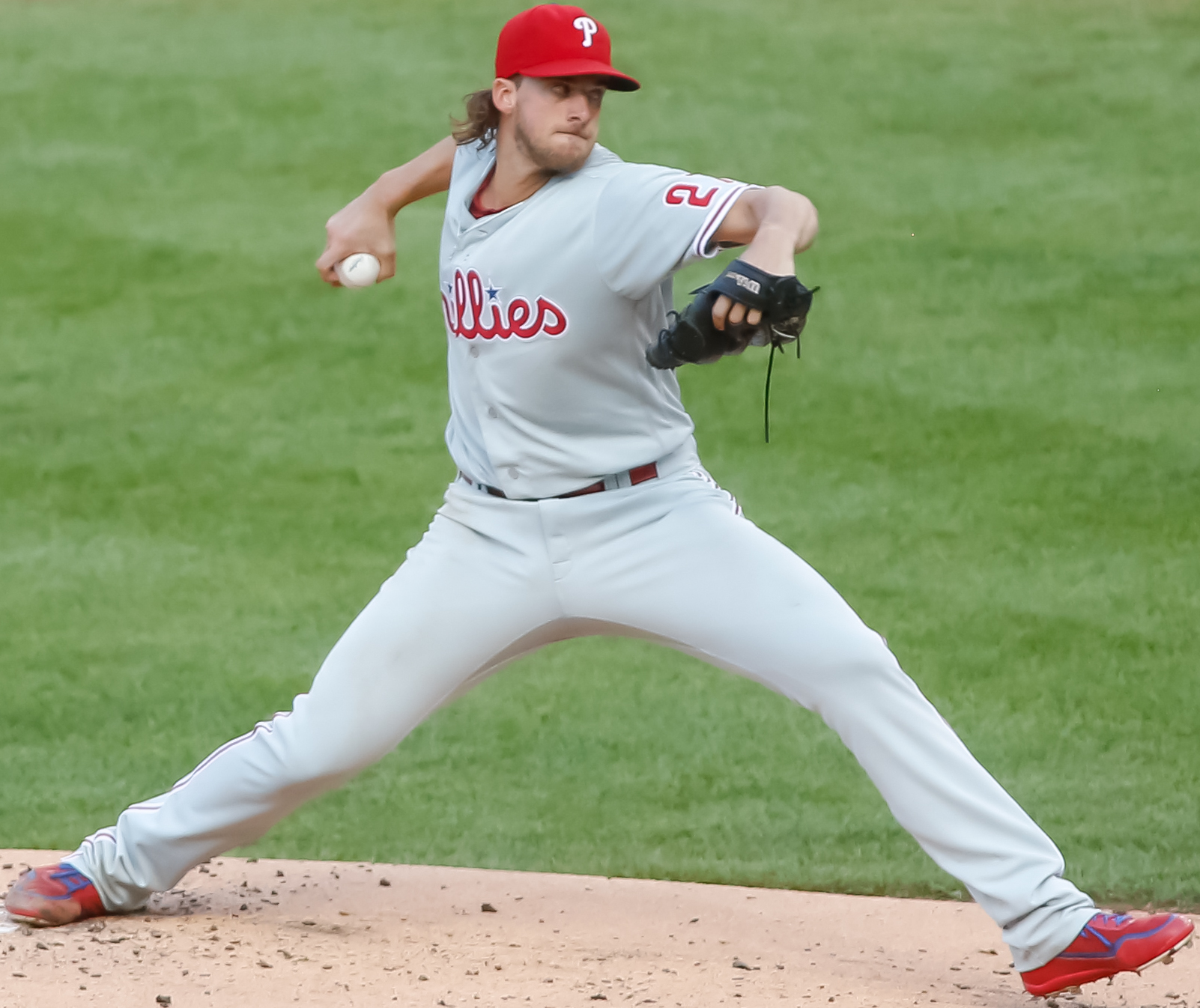
- Nola with the Philadelphia Phillies in 2020

Philadelphia Phillies – No. 27
- Pitcher
- Born: June 4, 1993 (age 33); Baton Rouge, Louisiana, U.S.
- Bats: Right Throws: Right

MLB debut
- July 21, 2015, for the Philadelphia Phillies

MLB statistics (through 2026 season)
- Win–loss record: 116–101
- Earned run average: 3.91
- Strikeouts: 2,053
- Stats at Baseball Reference

Teams
- Philadelphia Phillies (2015–present)

Career highlights and awards
- All-Star (2018); MLB records: Most consecutive strikeouts in a game (10, tied with Tom Seaver and Corbin Burnes)

Aaron Michael Nola (born June 4, 1993) is an American professional baseball pitcher for the Philadelphia Phillies of Major League Baseball (MLB).

Nola was born in Baton Rouge, Louisiana, and played baseball alongside his older brother Austin. His father, A. J., served as Nola's Little League coach until high school. After struggling his freshman season due to stress fractures in his back, Nola spent three years playing varsity baseball for Catholic High School in Baton Rouge, including two state playoff appearances. At the end of his senior year in 2011, the Louisiana Sports Writers Association named Nola the state's "Mr. Baseball".

Drafted by the Toronto Blue Jays in 2011, he instead attended Louisiana State University (LSU). In his three seasons as a weekend starter with the LSU Tigers, Nola was twice named the SEC Pitcher of the Year and won the National Pitcher of the Year Award in 2014. He also played collegiate summer baseball with the Harwich Mariners of the Cape Cod Baseball League.

The Phillies selected Nola seventh overall in the 2014 MLB draft, and he signed with the team that June. He advanced through the Phillies' farm system throughout the 2014 and 2015 seasons, becoming the first Phillies pitcher to make his major league debut the season after his draft since Pat Combs in 1989. Although Nola performed well in his first full season with the Phillies in 2016, he was shut down early due to an elbow injury. He returned in 2017 to beat Curt Schilling's 1996 record for most strikeouts by a Phillies pitcher with fewer than 30 starts in one season. The following year, he became the fourth pitcher in franchise history to record at least 200 strikeouts in a single season. Nola started six straight Opening Day games for the Phillies from 2018 until 2023 and was considered an ace during that stretch.

== Early life ==
Nola was born on June 4, 1993, in Baton Rouge, Louisiana, the son of A.J. and Stacie Nola. His maternal grandfather, Richard Barrios, served as sergeant at arms for the Louisiana House of Representatives. Although Nola started playing baseball at the age of nine, his passion for the sport only began when he watched his older brother Austin Nola play in tournaments. As a child, Nola used to mimic a pitching motion while watching himself in the mirror, a gesture that his father described as "strange gyrations".

Nola's father served as his Little League Baseball coach until high school, when he began playing for Catholic High School in Baton Rouge. Stress fractures in his back, which doctors attributed to a six-inch summer growth spurt, hampered Nola's freshman season. Nola spent three seasons on the varsity team, including two state playoff appearances. He missed one month of his junior season with a hernia but returned in the playoffs to pitch Catholic to the state finals. In his senior year, the Louisiana Sports Writers Association named Nola "Mr. Baseball", given to the top player in the state. Across his varsity baseball career, Nola posted a 21–2 win–loss record and 214 strikeouts in 152 innings pitched.

== College career ==
Both Aaron and Austin Nola were selected by the Toronto Blue Jays in the 2011 Major League Baseball (MLB) Draft. Aaron elected not to sign with the Blue Jays and instead attended Louisiana State University (LSU), where his brother was a senior. Nola majored in Sports Management at LSU and was roommates with Alex Bregman. After throwing 78 pitches in a 5–0 shutout game against Tulane, Nola gave up five runs in the first inning in his Southeastern Conference (SEC) debut against Mississippi State. He quickly rebounded, and posted five shutout innings, a recovery that struck LSU pitching coach Alan Dunn, who said that the turnaround "gave us a glimpse of how good Aaron could be". Head coach Paul Mainieri "made a commitment that day that [Nola] was going to be a starter on the weekend", a position that would have him pitch largely in conference games.

Nola finished his freshman season in 2012 with a 7–4 record and a 3.61 earned run average (ERA) in 89 2/3 innings, as well as with seven walks and 89 strikeouts. In the postseason, he was the starting pitcher in the first game of the best-of-three 2012 Baton Rouge Super Regional. It would be the only game that LSU would win against the Stony Brook Seawolves in that tournament. That summer, he played collegiate summer baseball with the Harwich Mariners of the Cape Cod Baseball League, with whom he recorded a 2–0 record and 0.82 ERA in 11 innings.

Nola impressed in his second season with LSU. On April 19, he threw his first career shutout complete game against Alabama, becoming the first LSU pitcher to shut out an SEC team since Kevin Gausman in 2011. On May 3 against Florida, Nola became the first LSU pitcher to record four consecutive complete-game victories since Mike Sirotka in 1993, and the first two record two shutouts in one season since Greg Smith in 2005. That year, Nola went 12–1 with a 1.57 ERA in 126 innings pitched. He also recorded a 0.82 walks plus hits per inning pitched (WHIP) measure. He was also named to the National Collegiate Baseball Writers Association (NCBWA), Baseball America, and Collegiate Baseball All-American teams, and was named the SEC Pitcher of the Year. Nola was a finalist for the National Pitcher of the Year Award, and was the recipient of the 2012–13 Corbett Award, given to the best amateur athlete in the state of Louisiana.

Prior to the 2014 season, Nola and Bregman were named first-team preseason All-Americans by the NCBWA. That year, he pitched to an 11–1 record with a 1.47 ERA, 27 walks, 134 strikeouts, and a .172 opponent batting average in 116 1/3 innings. He once again won the SEC Player of the Year Award, and was the recipient of the 2014 National Pitcher of the Year award. He was also a finalist for the Golden Spikes Award, given to the best amateur baseball player in the US, and the Dick Howser Trophy, awarded to the best national college baseball player of the year. Across his three-year career at LSU, Nola posted a 30–6 record and 2.09 ERA in 332 innings, with 42 walks and 345 strikeouts. He ranks third in LSU history for strikeouts, fourth for ERA, and fifth for pitching wins.

== Professional career ==
=== Draft and minor leagues ===
The Philadelphia Phillies selected Nola in the first round, seventh overall, of the 2014 MLB draft. He signed with the team for a $3.3 million signing bonus on June 10, 2014, and was assigned to the Phillies' Class A-Advanced minor league affiliate, the Clearwater Threshers. In his first five starts with the Threshers, Nola posted a 3.80 ERA and 18 strikeouts in 21 1/3 innings pitched. That season with Clearwater, he posted a 2–3 record, with a 3.16 ERA and 30 strikeouts in 31 1/3 innings pitched. He was then promoted to the Double-A Reading Phillies, making his debut on August 6, 2014, against the Harrisburg Senators. He threw 72 pitches, including 47 strikes, in five innings for the Phillies, who won 9–2. Nola closed out the season in Reading with a 2–0 record and 2.63 ERA in 24 innings pitched.

Nola began the 2015 season with Reading, going 7–3 in 12 starts with a 1.88 ERA and 0.89 WHIP. He was promoted to the Triple-A Lehigh Valley IronPigs on June 14, 2015. In his debut on June 18, Nola threw five shutout innings in a 3–0 win over the Buffalo Bisons. Nola went 3–1 with a 3.58 ERA and 1.44 WHIP in six starts with the IronPigs. He was selected for the 2015 MLB All-Star Futures Game but did not pitch. His last game before being called up to the majors was also his worst professional start, giving up six runs in three innings to the Rochester Red Wings.

=== Philadelphia Phillies (2015–present) ===
==== 2015–16 ====
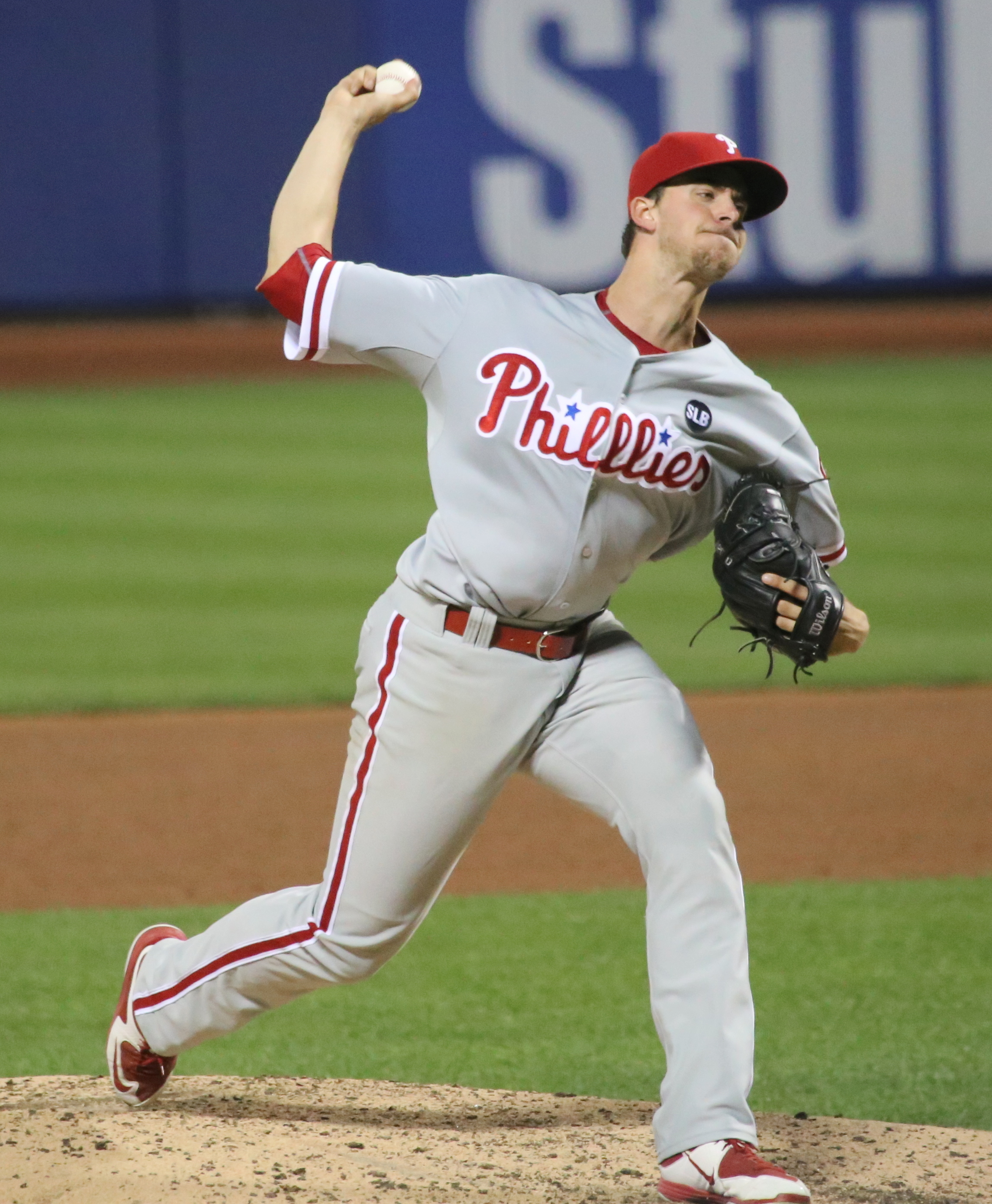
Nola with the Phillies in 2015

Nola made his major league debut on July 21, 2015, the first Phillies pitcher to debut the season after he was drafted since Pat Combs in 1989. He wore No. 27 for the Phillies, as his college jersey number 10 was used by coach Larry Bowa. He threw his first major league strikeout to Steven Souza Jr. in the first inning of the 1–0 loss against the Tampa Bay Rays. That one run was a solo home run, and the first career hit, from opposing pitcher Nathan Karns. He notched his first win less than a week later, pitching 7 2/3 innings and earning a run batted in (RBI) in the Phillies' July 26, 11–5 rout of the Chicago Cubs. Nola finished the season with a 6–2 record and 3.59 ERA in 13 starts and 77 2/3 innings pitched. The Phillies shut Nola down on September 27, following a decision made that July to end his season after pitching approximately 185 innings between the majors and minors.

On April 2, 2016, Nola was named to the Phillies' 2016 Opening Day roster. Although he managed a 5–4 record and 2.65 ERA in his first 12 starts, he soon struggled, posting a 9.82 ERA in eight starts between June 11 and July 28, and took a two-week break in July to focus on his physical and mental health. On August 3, the Phillies announced that Nola would go on the 15-day disabled list with a right elbow strain. Two weeks later, general manager Matt Klentak announced that Nola had been diagnosed with "low-grade" sprains and strains in his elbow, and that he would not pitch again for the remainder of the season. He pitched 111 innings that season in 20 starts and posted a 6–9 record and 4.78 ERA.

==== 2017–18 ====
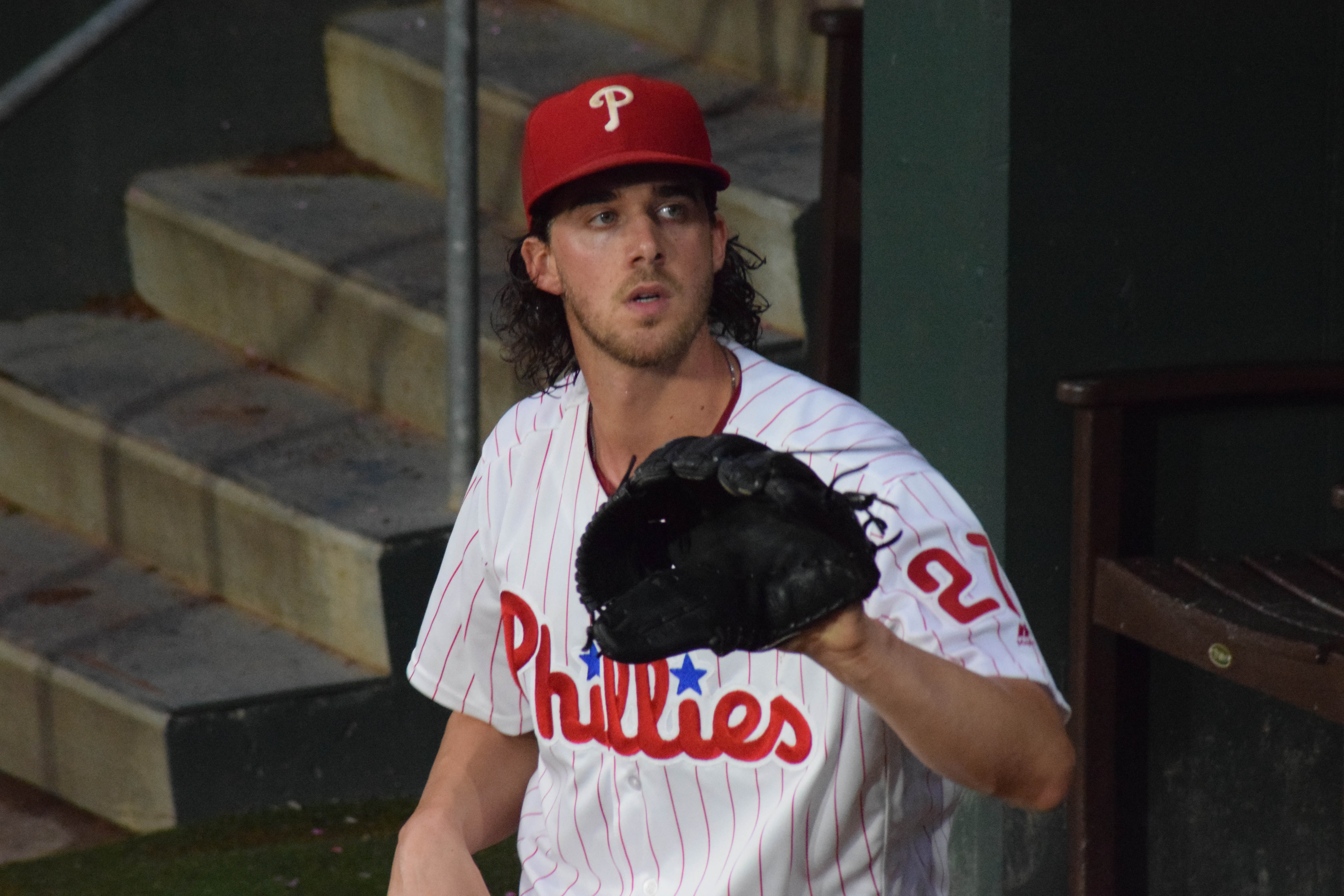
Nola in 2018

Going into 2017 spring training, Nola declared himself "100 percent", and he was named to the 25-man roster on April 2. He made a strong return to the mound, allowing two runs or fewer in 18 of his 27-season starts. Recording 184 strikeouts in 27 starts, Nola beat Curt Schilling's 1996 record for most strikeouts by a Phillies pitcher with fewer than 30 starts in one season. In April, he was briefly placed on the disabled list with a lower back strain. He finished the season with a 12–11 record, 3.54 ERA, and 184 strikeouts in 27 starts and 168 innings.

Nola was chosen as the Phillies' Opening Day starting pitcher in 2018. Manager Gabe Kapler's decision to remove Nola from the mound after only 68 pitches was subject to controversy, as the relief pitchers during that game gave up eight runs to the Atlanta Braves. On May 8, Nola struck out a career-high 12 batters in seven innings against the San Francisco Giants. He was named to the National League All Star team after posting an 11–2 record and 2.41 ERA in his first 18 starts of the season. Nola finished the season with a 17–6 record and 2.37 ERA in 33 starts and 212 1/3 innings. He was the second Phillie, after Grover Cleveland Alexander, to strike out over 200 batters and hold his opponents to a batting average of .200 or lower in a single season, and held the fourth-highest single-season strikeout record in Phillies history, behind Alexander, Schilling, and Jim Bunning. Nola came in third in voting for the National League Cy Young Award, behind Jacob deGrom of the New York Mets and Max Scherzer of the Washington Nationals.

==== 2019–20 ====
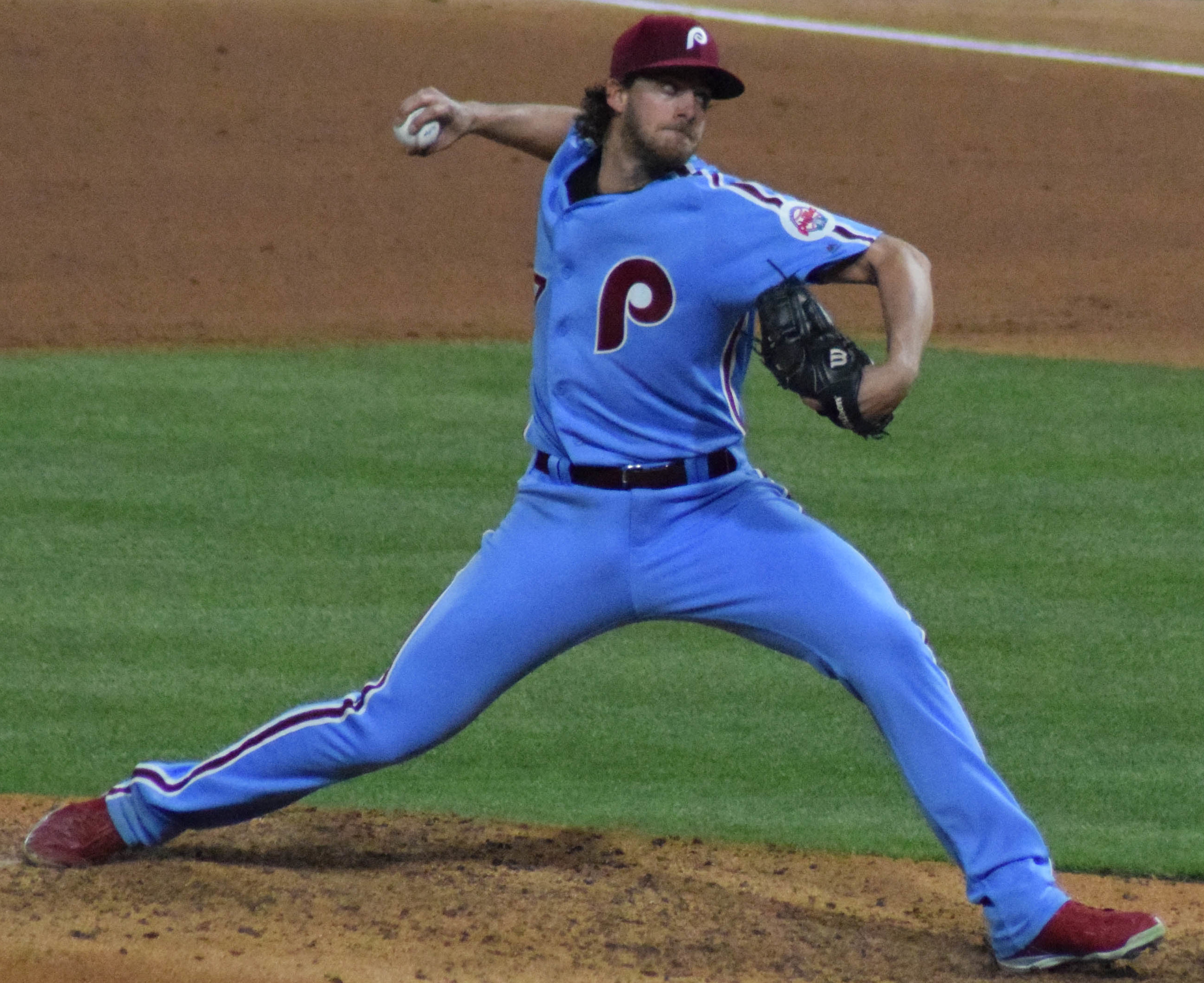
Nola pitching in 2019

During the offseason, on February 13, 2019, Nola signed a four-year, $45 million contract extension with the Phillies, including a $2 million signing bonus. He was once again named the Opening Day starter, throwing six innings in the team's 10–4 win over Atlanta. He posted a 12–7 record for the season, pitching to a 3.87 ERA and 229 strikeouts in 34 starts and 202 1/3 innings.

Nola arrived late to the Phillies' 2020 spring training after quarantining due to exposure to COVID-19. He made his third consecutive Opening Day start in 2020, starting in a 5–2 loss against the Miami Marlins. He pitched his first two complete games with the Phillies in 2020, both of which were only seven innings due to a rule that shortened doubleheaders. His August 26 start against the Nationals served as Joe Girardi's 1000th managerial win. In the pandemic-shortened 2020 season, he posted a 5–5 record and 3.28 ERA in 12 starts and 71 1/3 innings. Nola's 5–0 loss to the Rays at the end of the regular season eliminated the Phillies from wild card contention in the postseason.

==== 2021 ====
Nola was selected to pitch Opening Day for the fourth year in a row in 2021, the longest streak by a Phillies pitcher since Steve Carlton opened ten seasons in a row between 1977 and 1986. On April 18, Nola threw his first complete game shutout in the MLB, beating the St. Louis Cardinals 2–0. Less than two months later, on June 1, Nola recorded his 1,000th career strikeout. He was the fastest Phillies pitcher to reach that number, doing so in 913 innings, and joined Cole Hamels and Steve Carlton as the only Phillies pitchers to record 1,000 or more strikeouts before the age of 28. On June 25, Nola struck out 10 consecutive batters in a game against the Mets, tying Tom Seaver's April 22, 1970, record for most consecutive strikeouts in a game.

For the 2021 season, he had the lowest left on base percentage in the majors, at 66.8%. Nola finished the season with a 9–9 record, pitching to a 4.63 ERA and 223 strikeouts (5th in the NL) in 32 starts (8th) and 180 2/3 innings, while giving up 26 home runs (6th).

==== 2022 ====
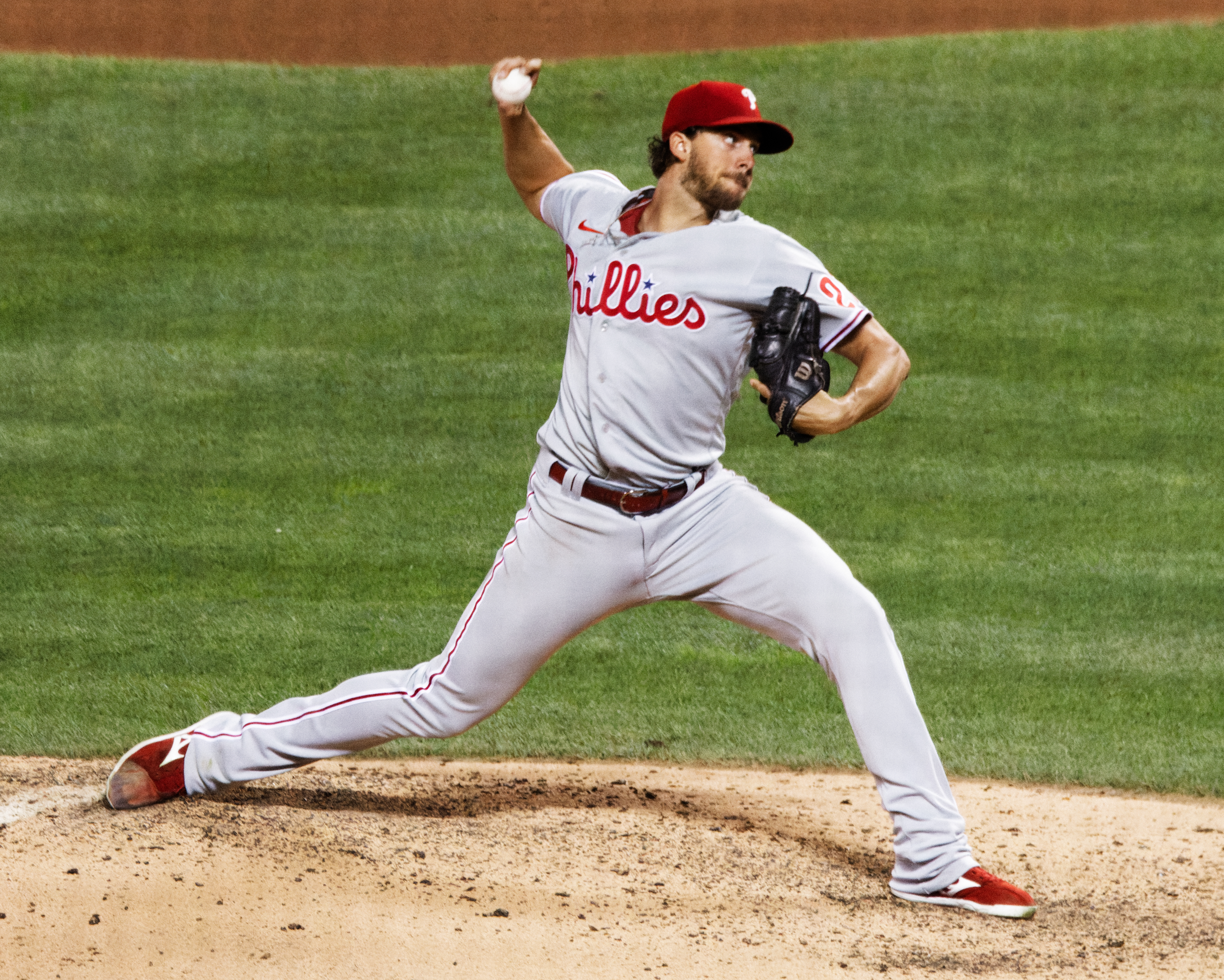
Nola with the Phillies in 2022

Due to an injury to Zack Wheeler, Nola was called upon to make his fifth consecutive opening day start pitching 6 innings and getting the win over the Oakland Athletics. On August 13, Nola pitched a complete game but took the loss in a pitcher's duel with Jacob deGrom 1–0. On October 3, Nola started the Phillies' playoff-clinching win over the Houston Astros, carrying a perfect game through 6 2/3 innings.

Nola finished the 2022 season with an 11–13 record, posting a 3.25 ERA and 235 strikeouts (3rd in the NL) in 32 starts (3rd) and 205 innings (2nd). Nola also lead the Majors in strikeout-to-walk ratio. Five days after the Phillies clinched in Houston, Nola threw 6 2/3 shutout innings against the St. Louis Cardinals in Game 2 of the National League Wild Card Series as the Phillies won the series 2–0. On October 14, Nola started Game 3 of the National League Division Series, the first Phillies home playoff game in eleven years. He allowed one unearned run and five hits over six innings. Nola started Game 2 of the National League Championship Series, as well, against the San Diego Padres. During the game, Aaron and Austin Nola became the first pair of brothers in Major League Baseball postseason history to face each other as pitcher and batter.

During the World Series, Nola was the starting pitcher for the Phillies in Game 1 and Game 4. Nola got a no-decision for Game 1 because he only pitched for 5 innings and gave up 5 runs, including a pair of home runs to Kyle Tucker, the Phillies tied the game and won in the 10th inning due to J. T. Realmuto's game-winning home run. But in Game 4, Nola gave up no runs throughout 4 innings but loaded the bases in the 5th inning and was lifted, and afterward left-handed relief pitcher Jose Alvarado's poor outing resulted in Astros' scoring 5 runs during the inning, and Nola ended up being the losing pitcher in Game 4, a turning point in World Series, which Phillies eventually lost in 6 games.

==== 2023 ====
On November 7, 2022, the Phillies exercised their end of the $16 million club option on Nola for the 2023 season. In the 2023 season, Nola posted a 12–9 record with a 4.46 ERA with 202 strikeouts (8th in the NL) in 32 starts (4th) and 193 2/3 innings (5th), as he gave up an NL-4th-most 32 home runs.

He became a free agent following the season but on November 19, 2023, he signed a seven-year, $172 million contract to return to the Phillies. The contract does not contain any opt-out provisions, and carries a lower average annual value than other comparable free agent starting pitchers to avoid surpassing MLB's luxury tax apron.

==== 2024 ====
Nola made 33 appearances (all starts, tied for the NL lead) for the Phillies over the course of the 2024 campaign, in which he compiled a 14-8 record and 3.57 ERA with 197 strikeouts (7th in the NL) across 199 1/3 innings pitched (3rd), as he gave up 30 home runs (leading the NL).

==== 2025 ====
In Nola's first nine starts of the 2025 season, he struggled to a 1-7 record and 6.16 ERA with 52 strikeouts. On June 10, Nola was shut down due to a stress reaction in his right rib cage. He was transferred to the 60-day injured list on June 19. Nola was activated on August 17. In his final start of the season against the Minnesota Twins on September 26, Nola pitched eight innings, allowed two hits and just one earned run, while striking out nine batters in a 3-1 victory. He struck out Edouard Julien in the fifth inning, the 1,872nd career strikeout of Nola's career, surpassing Robin Roberts for second place on the franchise's most strikeouts list. He made 17 appearances (all starts) for the Phillies over the course of the 2025 campaign, in which he compiled a 5-10 record and 6.01 ERA with 97 strikeouts across 94 1/3 innings pitched.

==== 2026 ====
In 2026, Nola made 33 starts (tied for the NL lead) with a 7–12 record, a 4.67 ERA, and an MLB-leading 37 home runs allowed in 175.1 innings (8th in the National League). He struck out 9.086 batters per 9 innings, 10th-best in the NL. As of early September, Garrett Stubbs had served as his catcher in seven of his last eight starts, and his ERA while Stubbs was catching him was far below that when J.T. Realmuto caught him (what Yahoo called "a massive difference"). Nola said: "“Stubby’s great... We have a good relationship and we talk a lot... We sit by each other on the plane, so we obviously have a lot of time to talk to each other and that’s the reality of a pitcher and a catcher." In 2026, he had a 2.82 ERA pitching to Stubbs, a 5.14 ERA pitching to Realmuto, and a 7.89 ERA pitching to Rafael Marchán.

== Pitching style ==
Early in his career, Nola was labeled the Phillies' ace, with his pitching record drawing favorable comparisons to former club standouts Cole Hamels, Cliff Lee, Roy Halladay, and Roy Oswalt. In 2020, Nola and his teammate Zack Wheeler tied for 11th among major league pitchers, recording 2 Wins Above Replacement (WAR) that season. Going into the 2021 season, Mike DePrisco of NBC Sports ranked Nola sixth among all 30 Opening Day pitchers, while Will Leitch of MLB.com placed him at number 10. In May 2020, Nola had struck out 9.63 batters per nine innings, the highest in franchise history. As of August 2025, he ranked third in the category, trailing Wheeler and Vince Velasquez.

Nola has largely maintained the same four-pitch lineup since entering the majors in 2015, throwing a four-seam fastball, a curveball, a changeup, and a sinker. He began working a cutter into his rotation during 2021 spring training, saying, "I've always wanted to throw one but never took it into a game." In his first season in the majors, Nola's four-seam fastball ranged between 91.6 and 93.8 mph (147.4 and 151.0 km/h), while his sinker averaged 90.1 mph (145.0 km/h). He increased his fastball speed to 93.3 mph (150.2 km/h) by the start of the 2018 season, but told The Philadelphia Inquirer that his focus is not on speed, saying, "There are different ways to get outs rather than throwing 95, 96, 97 [...] It would be nice to throw 97, but I physically can't."

Nola has consistently struggled during September. Between 2018 and 2020, his pre-September statistics showed a 30–9 record and 2.79 ERA in 62 starts, while in September over the same period, he pitched 4–9 with a 4.44 ERA in 17 starts. In 2019, Nola went 0–3 in September with a 6.51 ERA in five starts. Former manager Joe Girardi and Nola are aware of Nola's late-season struggles, but are unsure of why they occur.

Nola did not miss a start in the rotation from 2017 until May 2025 and was considered one of baseball's most durable pitchers in a profession increasingly plagued by Tommy John surgery. Nola pitched 1264 2/3 innings from 2018 to 2024, the most in the majors.

== Personal life ==
Nola is of Italian descent on his father's side. His great-grandparents emigrated to Baton Rouge from Sicily. His older brother Austin has also played in Major League Baseball. Their uncle suffers from amyotrophic lateral sclerosis (ALS). In January 2020, the Nola brothers hosted a "Strike Out ALS" charity event on his behalf.

During the COVID-19 pandemic, Nola partnered with Pennsylvania-based brewery Yuengling to launch "Cheers PA," an initiative to provide aid for restaurant and bar workers impacted by shutdowns. He and catcher J. T. Realmuto also serve as the Phillies' ambassadors for Garth Brooks' "Home Plate Project," which raises money to fight childhood hunger in the US and Canada. The Phillies nominated Nola for the 2020 Roberto Clemente Award for his charity work.

Nola is a Christian. His walk-up song is "I am Second" by Christian rock band Newsboys.

Nola and his wife, Hunter, were married on December 31, 2022. Their daughter was born on March 16, 2024. Their son was born in May, 2026.

== International career ==
Aaron Nola was named to the Italian national baseball team for the 2026 World Baseball Classic. He was eligible because his great-grandparents emigrated to Baton Rouge from Sicily. For Italy, Nola made two starts, only allowing one run with 8 strikeouts in 9 innings pitched.

== See also ==
- 2013 College Baseball All-America Team
- List of Major League Baseball individual streaks
- List of Major League Baseball career strikeout leaders
