= Darrel Akerfelds =

American baseball player (1962–2012)

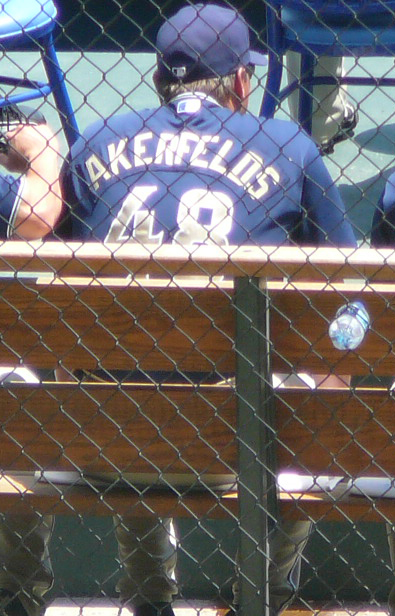
- Akerfelds with the Padres in 2008
- Pitcher
- Born: June 12, 1962; Denver, Colorado, U.S.
- Died: June 24, 2012 (aged 50); Phoenix, Arizona, U.S.
- Batted: Right Threw: Right

MLB debut
- August 1, 1986, for the Oakland Athletics

Last MLB appearance
- July 2, 1991, for the Philadelphia Phillies

MLB statistics
- Win–loss record: 9–10
- Earned run average: 5.08
- Strikeouts: 129
- Stats at Baseball Reference

Teams
- Oakland Athletics (1986); Cleveland Indians (1987); Texas Rangers (1989); Philadelphia Phillies (1990–1991); Wei Chuan Dragons (1994)

Darrel Wayne Akerfelds (June 12, 1962 – June 24, 2012) was an American professional baseball pitcher. He also served as the bullpen coach of Major League Baseball's San Diego Padres, from 2001 until his death. Akerfelds pitched in the major leagues in parts of five seasons, from 1986 to 1991 for the Oakland Athletics, Cleveland Indians, Texas Rangers, and Philadelphia Phillies.

== Early life and career ==
Akerfelds graduated in 1980 from Columbine High School in Littleton, Colorado. He was named a Parade High School All-American as a linebacker in football. He was drafted by the Atlanta Braves in the ninth round of the 1980 Major League Baseball draft, but chose to attend the University of Arkansas to play football and baseball. He played football at Arkansas under coach Lou Holtz, appearing in the 1981 Gator Bowl. He transferred from Arkansas to Mesa State College to focus on baseball. He was part of the 1982 Amateur World Series, in which the United States finished third.

Akerfelds was drafted by the Seattle Mariners in the first round with the seventh overall pick in the 1983 Major League Baseball draft. His brother Duane was drafted out of Columbine High School by the Mariners in the 22nd round in the same draft, but he never played professional baseball.

Just over five months after the draft, Akerfelds was traded to Oakland, with pitcher Bill Caudill for pitcher Dave Beard and catcher Bob Kearney. Akerfelds made his major league debut with the A's in 1986, giving up four runs but getting the final 11 outs in a 10–1 loss to the Minnesota Twins. He appeared in one more games for the A's in 1986.

Akerfelds was traded to Cleveland in July 1987 and spent the rest of the 1987 season in the majors, appearing in 16 games, 13 as a starter, with a win–loss record of 2–6 and a 6.75 earned run average (ERA). After spending all of 1988 down in the minor leagues, he was removed from Cleveland's 40 man roster, then selected in the Rule 5 draft by the Texas Rangers in December 1988.

Akerfelds spent most of 1989 in the minor leagues, though he pitched in six Rangers games, all of which his team lost. After the season, the Phillies purchased Akerfelds contract. His only full season in the majors came in 1990. He appeared in 71 games for the Phillies, all in relief. He had a 5–2 record with three saves and an ERA of 3.77.

== Later career ==
Akerfelds started 1991 in the majors, but his ERA rose to 5.26. He was returned to the minor leagues in July, where he was converted back into a starter. He started 11 games for the Scranton/Wilkes-Barre Red Barons, but his ERA was to 6.32 in Triple-A. Akerfelds became a free agent after the season. After signing with the Baltimore Orioles to start the 1992 season, Akerfelds spent another few seasons in the minors. He was a replacement player with the Angels in spring training in 1995 during the ongoing players' strike. After the strike ended, he became a coach with their Single-A affiliate. He finished his career that year without returning to the majors.

After his retirement as a player, Akerfelds spent 11 years as bullpen coach for the San Diego Padres, starting in 2001.

== Illness and death ==
In December 2010, Akerfelds was diagnosed with pancreatic cancer. He continued to coach for the Padres in the 2011 season, regularly balancing his treatment plan with the team's schedule. Akerfelds died in Phoenix, Arizona, on June 24, 2012, from complications of the disease.
