= Willie Greene =

American baseball player (born 1971)

- Third baseman
- Born: September 23, 1971 (age 54); Milledgeville, Georgia, U.S.
- Batted: Left Threw: Right

MLB debut
- September 1, 1992, for the Cincinnati Reds

Last MLB appearance
- October 1, 2000, for the Chicago Cubs

MLB statistics
- Batting average: .234
- Home runs: 86
- Runs batted in: 307
- Stats at Baseball Reference

Teams
- Cincinnati Reds (1992–1998); Baltimore Orioles (1998); Toronto Blue Jays (1999); Chicago Cubs (2000)

Willie Louis Greene (born September 23, 1971) is an American former professional baseball player in Major League Baseball (MLB). During his nine-year stint in the major leagues, Greene played for four teams: the Cincinnati Reds (1992–1998), the Baltimore Orioles (1998), Toronto Blue Jays (1999), and the Chicago Cubs (2000).

== Minor leagues ==
Greene was the Pittsburgh Pirates' first pick in the 1989 June draft, and was also Georgia's Gatorade Player of The Year in baseball (1989). He was traded to the Montreal Expos on August 8 of 1990 with Scott Ruskin and Moisés Alou for Zane Smith. On December 11, 1991, Green was traded by the Montreal Expos with Dave Martinez and Scott Ruskin to the Cincinnati Reds for Bill Risley and John Wetteland.

== Cincinnati Reds ==
From 1992 until 1995 Greene appeared on a sporadic basis with the Cincinnati Reds, before playing full-time beginning in 1996, appearing in 115 games that year. In 1997, he appeared in 151 games and 111 in 1998 before being traded to the Baltimore Orioles for Jeffrey Hammonds. Greene's best full season by WAR for the Reds was 1997, when he had a batting average of .253 with 26 home runs for a WAR of 1.5.
