= Marty Clary =

American baseball player (born 1962)

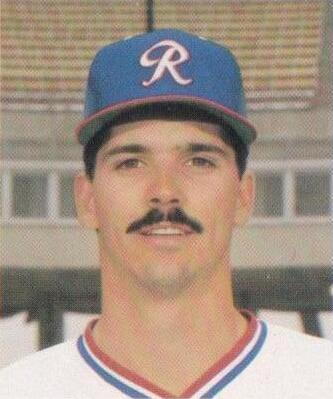
- Clary with the Richmond Braves c. 1987
- Pitcher
- Born: April 3, 1962 (age 63); Detroit, Michigan, U.S.
- Batted: Right Threw: Right

MLB debut
- September 5, 1987, for the Atlanta Braves

Last MLB appearance
- September 29, 1990, for the Atlanta Braves

MLB statistics
- Win–loss record: 5–14
- Earned run average: 4.48
- Strikeouts: 81
- Stats at Baseball Reference

Teams
- Atlanta Braves (1987, 1989–1990)

Martin Keith Clary (born April 3, 1962) is an American former right-handed pitcher in Major League Baseball who played from 1987 to 1990 for the Atlanta Braves. He attended Clawson High School in Clawson, Michigan, then played college baseball for the Northwestern Wildcats.

In 1995, he was a replacement player in spring training for the Florida Marlins during the ongoing strike. He ended his career pitching in four games for the Triple-A Charlotte Knights that year.
