= Mark Ross (baseball) =

American baseball player (born 1954)

- Pitcher
- Born: August 8, 1954 (age 71); Galveston, Texas, U.S.
- Batted: Right Threw: Right

MLB debut
- September 12, 1982, for the Houston Astros

Last MLB appearance
- August 15, 1990, for the Pittsburgh Pirates

MLB statistics
- Win–loss record: 2–2
- Earned run average: 3.83
- Strikeouts: 17
- Stats at Baseball Reference

Teams
- Houston Astros (1982, 1984–1985); Pittsburgh Pirates (1987); Toronto Blue Jays (1988); Pittsburgh Pirates (1990)
Medals
Baseball
Representing the United States
Amateur World Series
Silver medal – second place	1978 Italy	Team

Mark Joseph Ross (born August 8, 1954) is a former professional baseball pitcher. He pitched parts of six seasons in Major League Baseball between 1982 until 1990.

== Career ==
Ross was originally drafted by the Houston Astros in the 7th round of the 1979 Major League Baseball draft. After three years in their farm system, he earned a call-up in September 1982, pitching six innings over four games. He remained with the Houston organization through the end of the 1986 season, with two additional brief stints with the Astros in 1984 and 1985.

Following the 1986 season, Ross pitched in 13 more games, 10 with the Pittsburgh Pirates in 1987 and 1990, and 3 with the Toronto Blue Jays in 1989. Following the 1991, when he pitched for the Richmond Braves, Ross retired as a player. From 1996-99, Ross served as pitching coach for the Danville Braves (1996), Macon Braves (1997–98), and Jamestown Jammers (1999) in the Atlanta Braves farm system and has worked as a scout for the Astros.
