= Mike Roesler =

American baseball player (born 1963)

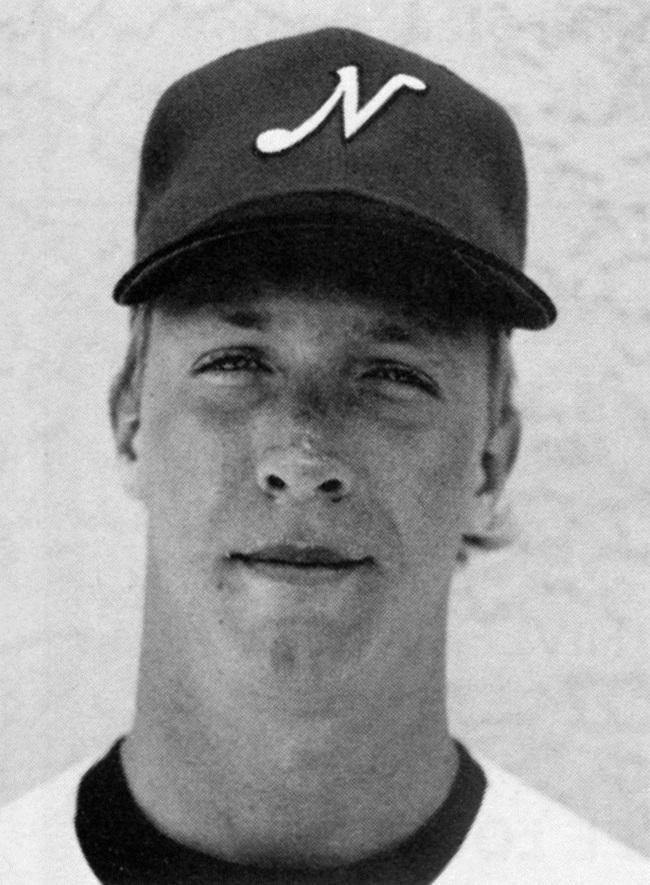
- Roesler with the Nashville Sounds in 1988
- Pitcher
- Born: September 12, 1963 (age 62); Fort Wayne, Indiana, U.S.
- Batted: Right Threw: Right

MLB debut
- August 9, 1989, for the Cincinnati Reds

Last MLB appearance
- April 23, 1990, for the Pittsburgh Pirates

MLB statistics
- Win–loss record: 1–1
- Earned run average: 3.77
- Strikeouts: 18

CPBL statistics
- Win–loss record: 0–1
- Earned run average: 10.80
- Strikeouts: 0
- Stats at Baseball Reference

Teams
- Cincinnati Reds (1989); Pittsburgh Pirates (1990); Brother Elephants (1994)

Michael Joseph Roesler (born September 12, 1963) is an American former Major League Baseball pitcher. He played during two seasons at the major league level for the Cincinnati Reds and Pittsburgh Pirates. He was drafted by the Reds in the 17th round of the 1985 amateur draft. Roesler played his first professional season with their Rookie league Billings Mustangs in 1985, and his last with the Kansas City Royals' Double-A Memphis Chicks and Triple-A Omaha Royals in 1993. When he was called up to MLB, he struck Will Clark as 1 out of 18 strikeouts. Roesler's last professional appearance was in 1 game for the Brother Elephants of the Chinese Professional Baseball League.

Before being drafted, he attended Bishop Luers High School in Fort Wayne, Indiana. He then went to Ball State University and was a four-year letterman.
