= Mike York (baseball) =

American baseball player (born 1964)

- Pitcher
- Born: September 6, 1964 (age 61); Oak Park, Illinois, U.S.
- Batted: Right Threw: Right

MLB debut
- August 17, 1990, for the Pittsburgh Pirates

Last MLB appearance
- August 16, 1991, for the Cleveland Indians

MLB statistics
- Win–loss record: 2-5
- Earned run average: 5.70
- Strikeouts: 23
- Stats at Baseball Reference

Teams
- Pittsburgh Pirates (1990); Cleveland Indians (1991)

Michael David York (born September 6, 1964) is an American former professional baseball pitcher. He played parts of two seasons in Major League Baseball for the Pittsburgh Pirates and Cleveland Indians.

== Career ==
York was drafted in 1982 by the New York Yankees, then bounced around the minor leagues for several years before reaching the majors with the Pirates in 1990. After starting 1991 back in the minors, he was traded to the Indians for Mitch Webster on May 16, and pitched in 14 games for Cleveland before once again returning to the minors. He pitched several more years in various minor leagues before retiring in 1998.
