= Chuck Malone =

American baseball player (born 1965)

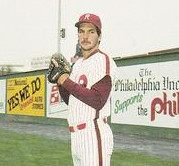
- Malone in 1988
- Pitcher
- Born: July 8, 1965 (age 61); Harrisburg, Arkansas, U.S.
- Batted: Right Threw: Right

MLB debut
- September 6, 1990, for the Philadelphia Phillies

Last MLB appearance
- October 3, 1990, for the Philadelphia Phillies

MLB statistics
- Win–loss record: 1–0
- Earned run average: 3.68
- Strikeouts: 7
- Stats at Baseball Reference

Teams
- Philadelphia Phillies (1990)

Charles Ray Malone (born July 8, 1965) is an American former relief pitcher who played briefly for the Philadelphia Phillies during the 1990 season. Listed at 6' 7", 250 lb., Malone batted and threw right-handed. He attended Arkansas State University.

In seven relief appearances, Malone posted a 3.68 ERA with two strikeouts in 7 1/3 innings of work. He did not have a decision or saves.
