= Bill Landrum =

American baseball player (born 1957)

- Pitcher
- Born: August 17, 1957 (age 67); Columbia, South Carolina, U.S.
- Batted: Right Threw: Right

MLB debut
- August 31, 1986, for the Cincinnati Reds

Last MLB appearance
- June 3, 1993, for the Cincinnati Reds

MLB statistics
- Win–loss record: 18–15
- Earned run average: 3.39
- Strikeouts: 218
- Saves: 58
- Stats at Baseball Reference

Teams
- Cincinnati Reds (1986–1987); Chicago Cubs (1988); Pittsburgh Pirates (1989–1991); Montreal Expos (1992); Cincinnati Reds (1993)

Thomas William Landrum (born August 17, 1957) is an American former professional baseball right-handed relief pitcher. He played eight seasons in Major League Baseball with four teams, the Cincinnati Reds, Chicago Cubs, the Pittsburgh Pirates and the Montreal Expos from 1986 to 1993.

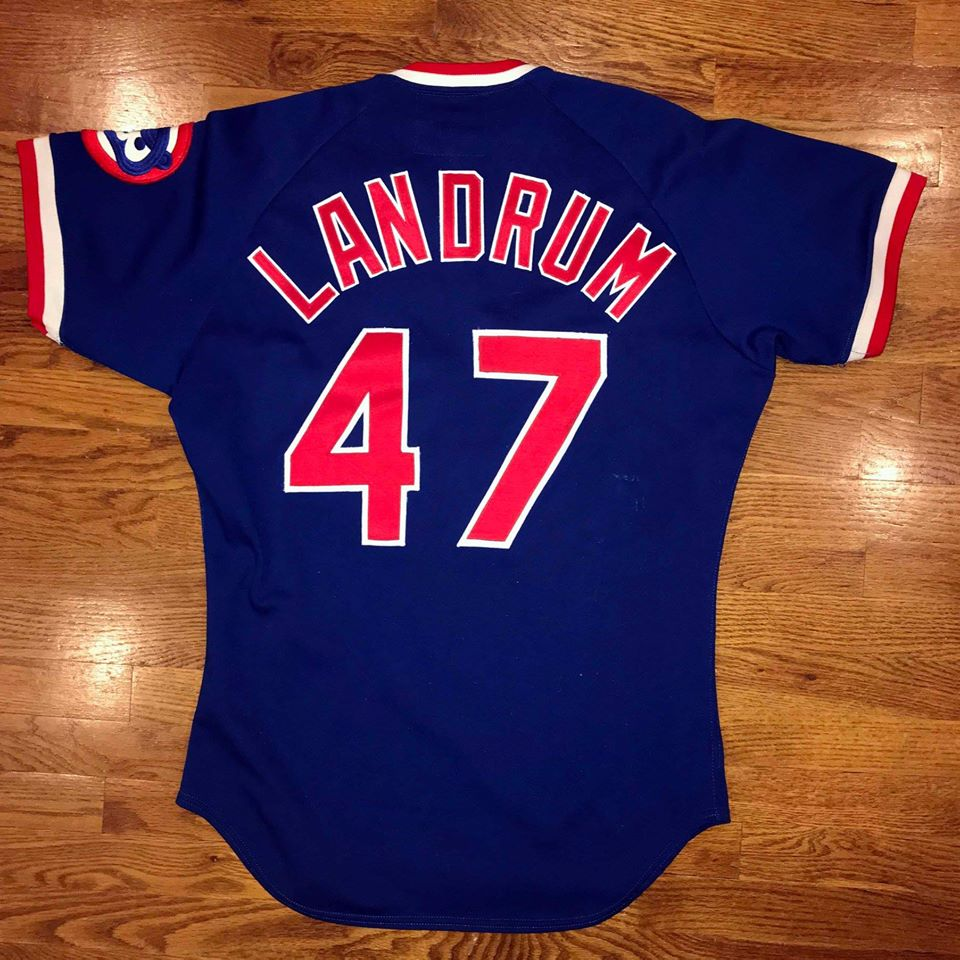
1988 Chicago Cubs #47 Bill Landrum game worn home jersey

Landrum finished sixth in the National League in saves with 26 in 1989 and had a 1.67 earned run average that season and finished seventh in the NL in saves with 17 in 1991 with the Pirates.

In 361.1 innings pitched over 268 games, Landrum handled 76 total chances (31 putouts, 45 assists) without an error for a perfect 1.000 fielding percentage.

His father Joe Landrum pitched for the Brooklyn Dodgers in the 1950s.

Bill Landrum has retired and lives in Columbia, South Carolina.

== See also ==
- List of second-generation Major League Baseball players
