= Bob Patterson (baseball) =

American baseball player (born 1959)

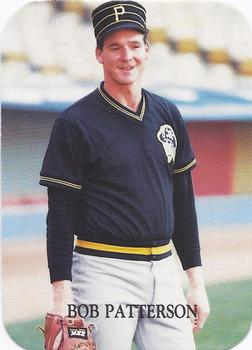
- Pitcher
- Born: May 16, 1959 (age 66); Jacksonville, Florida, U.S.
- Batted: Right Threw: Left

MLB debut
- September 2, 1985, for the San Diego Padres

Last MLB appearance
- July 11, 1998, for the Chicago Cubs

MLB statistics
- Win–loss record: 39–40
- Earned run average: 4.08
- Strikeouts: 483
- Stats at Baseball Reference

Teams
- San Diego Padres (1985); Pittsburgh Pirates (1986–1987, 1989–1992); Texas Rangers (1993); California Angels (1994–1995); Chicago Cubs (1996–1998)

Robert Chandler Patterson (born May 16, 1959) is an American former professional baseball player. He played all or part of 13 seasons in Major League Baseball (MLB) between 1985 and 1998, primarily as a middle-relief pitcher. He played for the San Diego Padres (1985), Pittsburgh Pirates (1986–92), Texas Rangers (1993), California Angels (1994–95) and Chicago Cubs (1996–98). He batted right-handed and threw left-handed.

In his career, Patterson posted a 39–40 record with a 4.08 ERA and 28 saves in 559 appearances, including a 2.68 strikeout-to-walk ratio (483-to-180), 175 games finished, and 617 1/3 innings.

He was a good fielding pitcher in his major league career. He committed only one error in 98 total chances for a .990 fielding percentage.

During his career, Patterson was known as the Glove Doctor: many players, even from opposing teams, would ask Patterson to repair their broken gloves. Patterson would spend his time in the bullpen during games repairing and relacing gloves, sometimes incorporating coat hangers, tongue depressors, and extra leather.
