= Pat Combs =

American baseball player (born 1966)

- Pitcher
- Born: October 29, 1966 (age 59); Newport, Rhode Island, U.S.
- Batted: Left Threw: Left

MLB debut
- September 5, 1989, for the Philadelphia Phillies

Last MLB appearance
- July 7, 1992, for the Philadelphia Phillies

MLB statistics
- Win–loss record: 17–17
- Earned run average: 4.22
- Strikeouts: 190
- Stats at Baseball Reference

Teams
- Philadelphia Phillies (1989–1992)

Patrick Dennis Combs (born October 29, 1966) is an American former professional baseball pitcher who played in Major League Baseball (MLB) for the Philadelphia Phillies between 1989 and 1992.

Combs, who statistically has drawn comparisons to pitcher John Keefe, attended Hastings High School in Houston, Texas, before enrolling in Baylor University.

== Baseball career ==
Combs was selected by the Philadelphia Phillies in the first round (11th overall) of the 1988 Major League Baseball draft. He had one "golden" season — that being his first professional year. In 1989, Combs had reached every level of professional baseball, from A-ball to the big leagues. For the Class A Clearwater Phillies, he went 2–1 with a 1.30 earned run average (ERA) in 6 games. For the Double-A Reading Phillies, Combs went 8–7 with a very respectable 3.38 ERA in 19 games. For the Triple-A Scranton/Wilkes-Barre Red Barons, he went 3–0 with a 0.37 ERA. Continuing with the Phillies, Combs went 4–0 with a 2.09 ERA in 6 games. Taking his success into consideration, the next year the Phillies placed Combs in the starting rotation. However, he was not able to maintain his streak. Combs went 10–10 with 4.07 ERA, with 86 walks and only 108 strikeouts. His performance continued to deteriorate, as Combs‘ ERA jumped to 7.71, in his final MLB season.

Two times in Combs‘ major league career, his walks yielded exceeded his strikeouts posted: In 1991, Combs walked 43 and struck out 41; in 1992 he walked 12 and struck out 11.

== After baseball ==
Combs resides in Southlake, Texas, and is the founder and chairman of Combs Capital Partners. He is also a leadership development consultant for Teamalytics. Combs has worked with various professional sports teams, as a player development consultant and in draft analysis. He and Tom House worked together for many years developing and growing MLB pitchers and NFL quarterbacks. Combs is also the author of More Than The Score: How Parents and Coaches Can Cultivate Virtue in Youth Athletes, published in 2020. Combs' youngest son, Casey, was a catcher in the Miami Marlins organization, and is currently a free agent.
