= Scott Ruskin (baseball) =

American baseball player (born 1963)

- Pitcher
- Born: June 8, 1963 (age 61); Jacksonville, Florida, U.S.
- Batted: Right Threw: Left

MLB debut
- April 9, 1990, for the Pittsburgh Pirates

Last MLB appearance
- September 16, 1993, for the Cincinnati Reds

MLB statistics
- Win–loss record: 11–9
- Earned run average: 3.95
- Strikeouts: 146
- Stats at Baseball Reference

Teams
- Pittsburgh Pirates (1990); Montreal Expos (1990–1991); Cincinnati Reds (1992–1993)

Scott Drew Ruskin (born June 8, 1963) is an American former professional baseball player who was a pitcher for four Major League Baseball seasons. He played for the Pittsburgh Pirates in 1990, Montreal Expos from 1990 to 1991, and Cincinnati Reds from 1992 to 1993.

== Career ==
Ruskin was born in Jacksonville, Florida. He attended Sandalwood High School in Jacksonville, and played high school baseball for the Sandalwood Saints.

Ruskin received an athletic scholarship to attend the University of Florida in Gainesville, Florida, where he played for coach Joe Arnold's Florida Gators baseball team from 1982 to 1985. In 1983, he played collegiate summer baseball with the Falmouth Commodores of the Cape Cod Baseball League. He received All-Southeastern conference (SEC) honors in 1984 and 1985 and was a second-team All-American in 1984. Ruskin returned to the university after his professional baseball career was over, and completed his bachelor's degree in computer and information science in 2003.

== See also ==
- Florida Gators
- List of Florida Gators baseball players
- List of University of Florida alumni
