= 1901 Vermont Green and Gold football team =

American college football season

1901 Vermont Green and Gold football
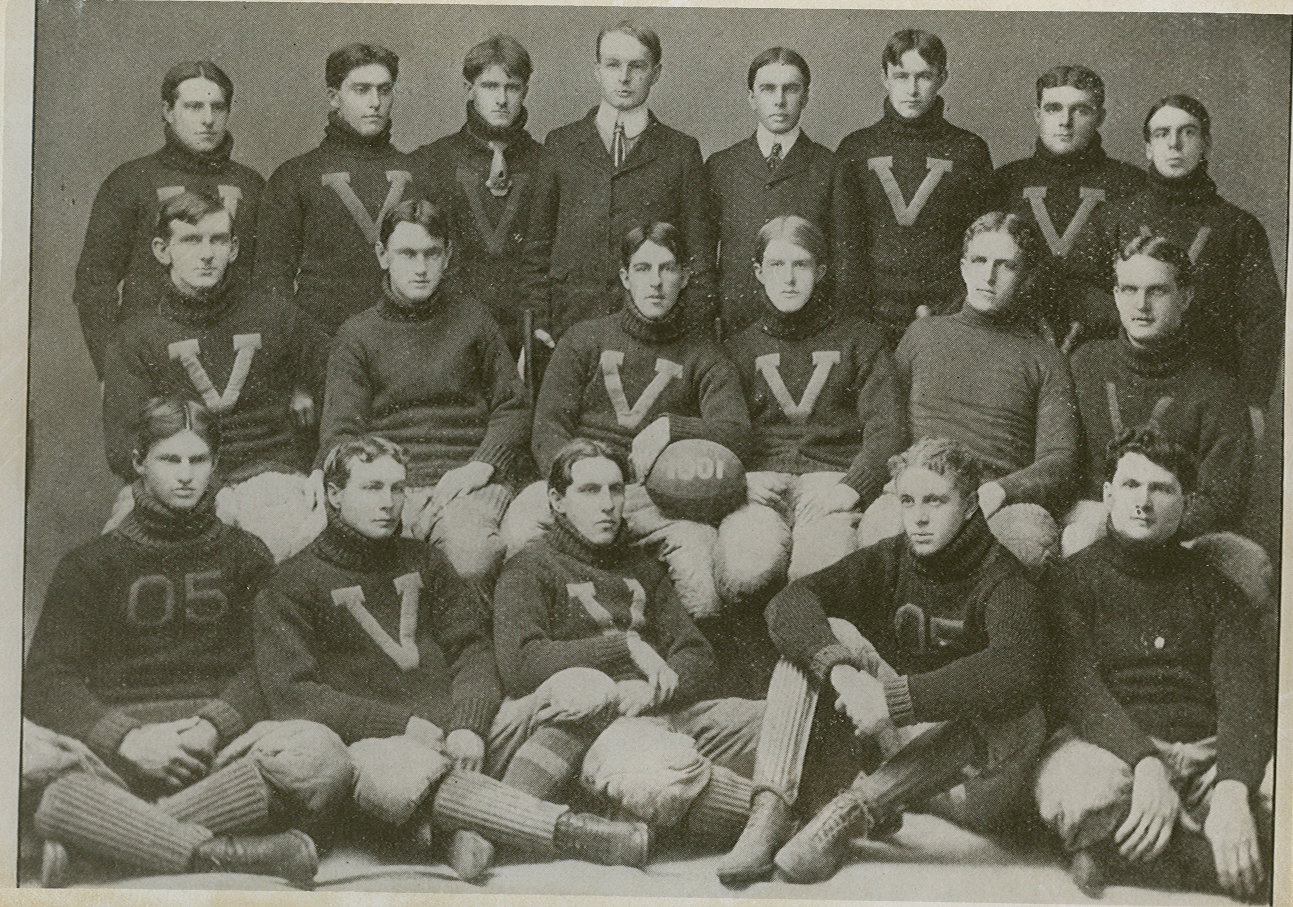
- Conference: Independent
- Record: 5–5–1
- Head coach: P. J. McMahon (1st season)
- Home stadium: Athletic Park

1901 Eastern college football independents records
| | Conf. | | | Overall |
| Team | W | L | T | W | | L | | T |
|---|---|---|---|---|---|---|---|---|
| Harvard | | – | | 12 | – | 0 | – | 0 |
| Yale | | – | | 11 | – | 1 | – | 1 |
| Cornell | | – | | 11 | – | 1 | – | 0 |
| Dartmouth | | – | | 10 | – | 1 | – | 0 |
| Massachusetts | | – | | 9 | – | 1 | – | 0 |
| Princeton | | – | | 9 | – | 1 | – | 1 |
| Syracuse | | – | | 7 | – | 1 | – | 0 |
| Geneva | | – | | 7 | – | 1 | – | 1 |
| Holy Cross | | – | | 7 | – | 1 | – | 1 |
| Army | | – | | 5 | – | 1 | – | 2 |
| Western U. of Penn | | – | | 7 | – | 2 | – | 1 |
| Lafayette | | – | | 9 | – | 3 | – | 0 |
| Swarthmore | | – | | 8 | – | 2 | – | 2 |
| Washington & Jefferson | | – | | 6 | – | 2 | – | 2 |
| Franklin & Marshall | | – | | 7 | – | 3 | – | 1 |
| Penn | | – | | 10 | – | 5 | – | 0 |
| Buffalo | | – | | 4 | – | 2 | – | 0 |
| Columbia | | – | | 8 | – | 5 | – | 0 |
| Fordham | | – | | 2 | – | 1 | – | 1 |
| Penn State | | – | | 5 | – | 3 | – | 0 |
| Bucknell | | – | | 6 | – | 4 | – | 0 |
| Temple | | – | | 3 | – | 2 | – | 0 |
| NYU | | – | | 4 | – | 3 | – | 1 |
| Pittsburgh College | | – | | 3 | – | 3 | – | 0 |
| Tufts | | – | | 6 | – | 6 | – | 1 |
| Vermont | | – | | 5 | – | 5 | – | 1 |
| Carlisle | | – | | 5 | – | 7 | – | 1 |
| Dickinson | | – | | 4 | – | 6 | – | 0 |
| Brown | | – | | 4 | – | 7 | – | 1 |
| Villanova | | – | | 2 | – | 3 | – | 0 |
| Drexel | | – | | 2 | – | 5 | – | 1 |
| Colgate | | – | | 2 | – | 5 | – | 0 |
| Boston College | | – | | 1 | – | 8 | – | 0 |
| Lehigh | | – | | 1 | – | 11 | – | 0 |
| New Hampshire | | – | | 0 | – | 6 | – | 0 |
| Rutgers | | – | | 0 | – | 7 | – | 0 |

The 1901 Vermont Green and Gold football team was an American football team that represented the University of Vermont during the 1901 college football season. In its first and only season under head coach P. J. McMahon the team compiled a 5–5–1 record and was outscored by a total of 171 to 146. The team played its home games at Athletic Park in Burlington, Vermont.

== Schedule ==
| Date | Opponent | Site | Result | Source |
|---|---|---|---|---|
| October 2 | Montpelier Seminary | Athletic Park; Burlington, VT | W 43–0 | |
| October 9 | Norwich | Athletic Park; Burlington, VT | W 56–0 | |
| October 12 | Middlebury | Athletic Park; Burlington, VT | L 0–12 | |
| October 15 | Tufts | Athletic Park; Burlington, VT | W 6–5 | |
| October 19 | St. Lawrence | Athletic Park; Burlington, VT | W 16–5 | |
| October 26 | at Wesleyan | Middletown, CT | T 0–0 | |
| November 5 | at Union (NY) | Schenectady, NY | L 5–22 | |
| November 9 | at Dartmouth | Alumni Oval; Hanover, NH | L 0–22 | |
| November 16 | at Middlebury | Middlebury, VT | W 21–0 | |
| November 20 | at Syracuse | Archbold Field; Syracuse, NY | L 0–38 | |
| November 23 | at Cornell | Percy Field; Ithaca, NY | L 0–67 | |
