= William Farrar =

William Farrar may refer to:

- William Farrar (American football), American football official, player and coach
- William H. Farrar (1826–1873), mayor of Portland, Oregon
- William Farrar (councillor), early US settler and member of the King's Council
