= List of Vermont Catamounts in the NFL draft =

This is a list of Vermont Catamounts football players in the NFL draft.

== Key ==
B	Back	K	Kicker	NT	Nose tackle
C	Center	LB	Linebacker	FB	Fullback
DB	Defensive back	P	Punter	HB	Halfback
DE	Defensive end	QB	Quarterback	WR	Wide receiver
DT	Defensive tackle	RB	Running back	G	Guard
E	End	T	Offensive tackle	TE	Tight end

= Pro Bowler
= Hall of Famer

== Selections ==
Year	Round	Pick	Player	Team	Position
1957	19	218	Paul Harasimowicz	Philadelphia Eagles	T
1967	15	380	Jack Schweberger	New York Jets	WR
1968	15	386	Jeff Kuhman	Denver Broncos	LB
