= Greg Legg =

American baseball player (born 1960)

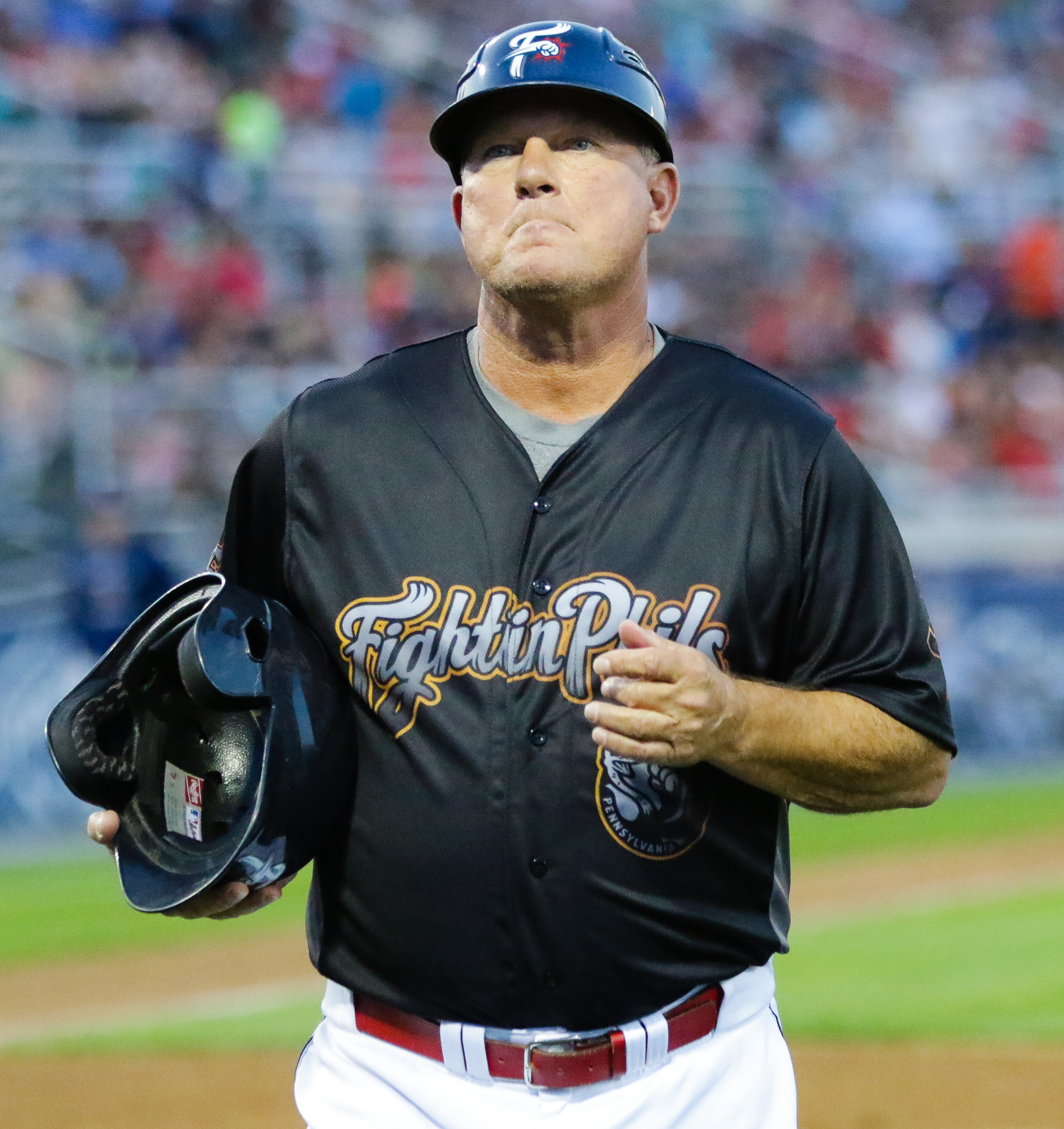
- Legg with the Reading Fightin Phils in 2017
- Second baseman
- Born: April 21, 1960 (age 65); San Jose, California, U.S.
- Batted: Right Threw: Right

MLB debut
- April 18, 1986, for the Philadelphia Phillies

Last MLB appearance
- June 15, 1987, for the Philadelphia Phillies

MLB statistics
- Batting average: .409
- Hits: 9
- Runs batted in: 1
- Stats at Baseball Reference

Teams
- Philadelphia Phillies (1986–1987)

Gregory Lynn Legg (born April 21, 1960), is an American professional baseball second baseman, who played in Major League Baseball (MLB) for the Philadelphia Phillies, in two seasons (1986–1987). During his playing days, Legg stood 6 feet 1 inch (1.85 m), weighing 185 pounds (84 kg).

Legg spent a total of 13 seasons as an active player, all in the Philadelphia organization, later managing the Phillies' Minor League Baseball (MiLB) Double-A farm team, the Reading Phillies, for whom he had previously played.

In 2009 and 2010, Legg was the hitting coach for the back-to-back South Atlantic League-champion Lakewood BlueClaws. He returned to Reading, as field manager of the Fightin Phils, for the 2017–2018 seasons. Legg joined the Lehigh Valley IronPigs’ coaching staff, for the 2019 season.

== Early life and college ==
Greg Legg was born on April 21, 1960, in San Jose, California. He graduated from Duncan High School in Duncan, Oklahoma, and matriculated at Southeastern Oklahoma State University in 1978. He played four seasons for the Savages; in all four of his playing years, the team competed in the NAIA Baseball World Series. Legg was a two-time All-American and was named to the all-district team in 1980, 1981, and 1982. During his four-year career at Southeastern, the baseball team accumulated a 209–40 win–loss record (a .839 winning percentage). After college, Legg was drafted by the Philadelphia Phillies in the 22nd round of the 1982 Major League Baseball draft.

== Baseball career ==
=== 1982–1984 ===
After signing, Legg was assigned to the Peninsula Pilots, the Phillies' A-level affiliate in the Carolina League. Playing alongside future Philadelphia Baseball Wall of Fame members Darren Daulton and Juan Samuel, Legg appeared in 44 games, making 56 putouts and 130 assists. He committed 15 errors—the lowest total among the team's three regular shortstops—good for a .925 fielding percentage. At the plate, he posted a .343 batting average, notching 9 doubles and 20 runs batted in (RBI). He also stole 2 bases and scored 20 runs during the 1982 season.

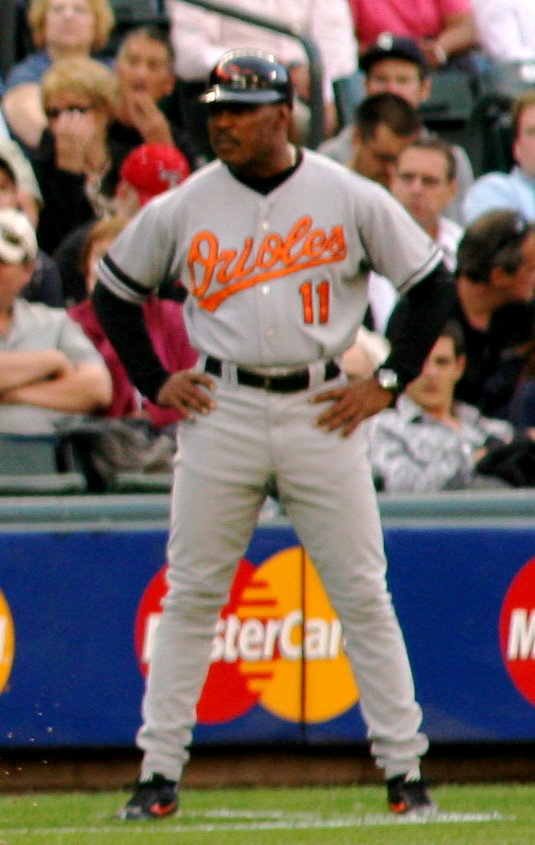
Legg and Juan Samuel (pictured) were teammates in the minor leagues in 1982 and 1983.

Legg, Daulton, and Samuel were all promoted together to the Eastern League's Reading Phillies in 1983. Legg posted a .317 average for the season, the second-best mark among the team's regular batters (40 or more games played); he also notched his first professional home runs, hitting four to go with fourteen doubles and one triple. In the field, he appeared in at least one game at all four infield positions, with most coming at shortstop and third base. In 29 games as a shortstop, Legg committed ten errors, but in 41 games at the other three infield spots, he recorded only three fielding mistakes.

The Phillies shifted Legg primarily to second base for the 1984 season; he appeared in 57 games at the position for Reading before a promotion to the Portland Beavers. In the first half of the season for the R-Phils, Legg batted .241 in 64 contests, amassing 14 extra-base hits and 27 RBI. After moving to the Oregon club, Legg continued his .241 batting pace in 141 at-bats, collecting eight doubles and one home run.

=== 1985–1987 ===
Playing for Portland in 1985, Legg increased his power, hitting a career-high seven home runs. He added seven triples and eleven doubles to his total for a tally of 25 extra-base hits. His 420 at-bats were third-most on the team, and he played in 115 games, appearing only as a second baseman.

In 1986, Legg began the season with the major league club, appearing in three April games. He made his major league debut against the New York Mets, entering in the seventh inning of an April 18 contest as a defensive replacement for second baseman Luis Aguayo. He notched his first two major league at-bats against the Mets on April 20, striking out once. His first hit came on April 27, a pinch-hit against the Pittsburgh Pirates in a 13–5 Phillies loss, after which he was sent back down to Portland. Appearing exclusively at second base, Legg appeared in 120 games in the field for Portland, committing only four errors to notch a .994 fielding percentage. As a hitter, he batted .323, the best mark on the team among those players who exceeded 100 games played. He also led the Beavers with 66 RBI, was fifth-best with six home runs, and tallied 149 hits. He returned to the major league Phillies as a September call-up, appearing in eight major league games after September 1. Legg collected the top performance of his major league career against the Pirates on September 16, hitting safely three times in five at-bats, including a double, scoring one run, and earning his first major-league RBI. He went 1-for-1 against the Chicago Cubs on September 29, and then hit safely twice in two consecutive games against the Montreal Expos on October 4 and 5, raising his season average to .450.

Legg spent most of the 1987 season in Triple-A with the Maine Guides, for whom he batted .241 with 16 doubles, 4 triples, 4 home runs, and 30 RBI. He appeared at second base, third base, and shortstop in 1987, mirroring his brief appearance with the major league Phillies. In three contests with the top-level club in 1987, he appeared in one game at each of those three positions, scoring one run in two at-bats over the three games. In the field for Maine, he made a total of 13 errors: 8 at second base, 4 at third base, and 1 at shortstop, regardless of making more appearances at shortstop than at the hot corner.

=== 1988–1990 ===
Legg split time between Reading and Maine in the 1988 season. In Reading, he batted .266 in 84 games. He played 81 games in the field: 80 as a second baseman; and 1 as a shortstop. His ten extra-base hits playing in Pennsylvania included eight doubles, one triple, and one home run, and he batted in 33 runs. As a fielder, he amassed 132 putouts at second base, along with 215 assists against 6 errors; at shortstop, he committed no errors while putting out one and assisting on five outs. After promotion to Maine, where the club was now known as the "Maine Phillies", Legg batted .242 with a home run and seven doubles under manager George Culver. He split time equally at shortstop and second base for the New England club, collecting a .966 fielding percentage at the former position and a .956 percentage at the latter. For the year, Legg's final average was .258, along with a .308 slugging percentage and a .345 on-base percentage.

After the 1988 season, the Phillies' Triple-A franchise moved to the Wyoming Valley in Northeastern Pennsylvania, becoming the Scranton/Wilkes-Barre Red Barons. Legg batted .248 for the newly minted team, batting in 33 runs on 94 hits, 12 for extra bases. He played primarily third base (40 games) and shortstop (42 games), but made limited appearances at second base as well (21 games), totaling 11 errors as a fielder. Legg also made his first career appearances as a pitcher, totaling two innings pitched. He allowed six runs on eight hits to amass a 27.00 earned run average (ERA) for the 1989 season.

Legg continued with the Red Barons in 1990, becoming mostly a third baseman for Scranton. He also appeared at second and first bases, as well as shortstop, but totaled a .974 fielding percentage (2 errors) at the hot corner. He raised his batting average 60 points to .308, amassing 6 extra-base hits and 21 RBI. 31 walks helped to raise his on-base average to .416, and he slugged .355, scoring 25 runs.

=== 1991–1994 ===
For the 1991 Red Barons, Legg was the primary backup to the starting infielders, making the team's second-highest number of appearances at second base, third base, and shortstop. His highest total came at third, where he made 22 putouts, 72 assists, and 4 errors in 45 games, amassing a range factor of 2.09. At second base, he had a perfect 1.000 fielding percentage, with no errors in 38 games. He also made a single pitching appearance, allowing a run on three hits in a single inning of work. He batted .290 for the year, collecting four triples and three home runs, along with 15 home runs and 41 RBI. The following year, Legg split time between second and third bases, making 6 errors in 86 games played in the field. As a hitter, he batted only .228, the lowest single-season total of his career. He hit for extra bases 15 times and batted in 29 runs.

Legg bounced back in 1993 at age 33—the oldest Red Baron—raising his average to .280. He notched 13 doubles and 3 triples, batting in 25 runs. He led the team in appearances at second base, making five errors. He also played in a few games at third base and one at shortstop. Having stopped playing to coach for the 1994 season, Legg was activated into the minor league system by the Phillies after an injury to shortstop Kevin Stocker. After batting .298 with four doubles, two home runs, and ten RBI during the 1994 season, Legg retired for good to become a coach.

== After playing ==
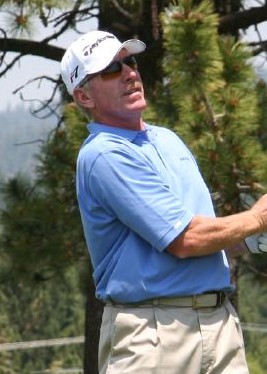
Legg replaced Mike Schmidt (pictured) as the Clearwater Threshers' manager in 2005.

After leaving the Red Barons, Legg stayed with the Phillies franchise, moving to the Clearwater Phillies as their hitting coach for 1994 and 1995; the team finished with the Florida State League's best record in his second year. In 1996, Legg was inducted into the Southeastern Oklahoma State University Athletic Hall of Fame by his alma mater on January 27. He was the hitting coach for the Scranton/Wilkes-Barre Red Barons that season, when the team posted a 70–72 record.

In 1997, Legg was given his first managing position, leading the Batavia Clippers to the New York–Penn League finals, where they lost to the Pittsfield Mets. He managed the Martinsville Phillies in 1998, and returned to Batavia in 1999, where the newly renamed Muckdogs lost in the semi-finals. He led the Piedmont Boll Weevils to another semi-final defeat in 2000, and was named the Lakewood BlueClaws' inaugural manager in 2001.

In 2002, the Reading Phillies named Legg their manager, and he accumulated a 76–66 record in his first season. It was his only winning record, however, in three seasons as the team's manager; his 202 wins are the fifth-best total among Reading's managers. For the 2005 season, Legg moved to Clearwater, with the team now known as the "Threshers", taking over the manager's duties from Mike Schmidt. In two seasons with Clearwater, he improved the team from a .301 winning percentage (41–95) to .482 (67–72), and he proceeded to the Williamsport Crosscutters for the 2007 season.

For the 2008 season, Legg returned to Lakewood as the hitting coach, helping the BlueClaws to an 80–60 record. In July 2008, during the Beijing Olympics, Legg served on the staff of the major league club as a short-term replacement as bullpen coach for Roly de Armas, who was on the staff of Team USA. In 2009 and 2010, Legg and the BlueClaws staff led the team to back-to-back South Atlantic League championships.

== Philanthropy ==
In February 2010, Legg established the Northeast Pennsylvania Diamond Scholarship Award, a $1,000 award presented annually to a high school baseball player from Luzerne or Lackawanna Counties in Pennsylvania. Legg said of the scholarship, "There are so many charities that touch all our lives... I wanted to put a face on it, I wanted it to be a baseball scholarship. Down the road we will be looking to add a softball player as well."

== See also ==
- Philadelphia Phillies all-time roster (L)
