= 1897 Vermont Green and Gold football team =

American college football season

1897 Vermont Green and Gold football
- Conference: Independent
- Record: 3–0–2
- Head coach: William Farrar (1st season)
- Home stadium: Athletic Park

1897 Eastern college football independents records
	Conf.			Overall
Team	W	L	T	W		L		T
Penn		–		15	–	0	–	0
Princeton		–		10	–	1	–	0
Washington & Jefferson		–		10	–	1	–	0
Yale		–		9	–	0	–	2
Buffalo		–		9	–	1	–	0
Harvard		–		10	–	1	–	1
Army		–		6	–	1	–	1
Vermont		–		3	–	0	–	2
Lafayette		–		9	–	2	–	1
Drexel		–		6	–	2	–	1
Colgate		–		5	–	2	–	1
Dickinson		–		7	–	3	–	2
Swarthmore		–		7	–	3	–	2
Fordham		–		2	–	1	–	1
Cornell		–		5	–	3	–	1
Syracuse		–		5	–	3	–	1
Brown		–		7	–	4	–	0
Carlisle		–		6	–	4	–	0
Boston College		–		4	–	3	–	0
Holy Cross		–		4	–	3	–	1
Wesleyan		–		8	–	7	–	0
Bucknell		–		3	–	3	–	1
NYU		–		3	–	3	–	0
Temple		–		3	–	3	–	0
Trinity (CT)		–		4	–	4	–	1
Tufts		–		6	–	7	–	0
Geneva		–		3	–	4	–	1
Pittsburgh College		–		3	–	5	–	2
Villanova		–		3	–	5	–	1
Penn State		–		3	–	6	–	0
Amherst		–		2	–	6	–	2
Franklin & Marshall		–		2	–	6	–	2
Lehigh		–		3	–	7	–	0
New Hampshire		–		2	–	5	–	0
Rutgers		–		2	–	5	–	0
Western Univ. Penn.		–		1	–	3	–	0

The 1897 Vermont Green and Gold football team was an American football team that represented the University of Vermont as an independent during the 1897 college football season. In their first year under head coach William Farrar, the team compiled a 3–0–2 record. This season is often cited in official University of Vermont records as the school's first football season.

== Schedule ==
Date	Opponent	Site	Result	Source
October 16	Rutland Institute	Athletic Park; Burlington, VT	T 0–0	
October 23	Middlebury	Athletic Park; Burlington, VT	W 14–0	
October 25	Montpelier Seminary	Athletic Park; Burlington, VT	T 10–10	
October 30	Rutland Institute	Athletic Park; Burlington, VT	W 12–0	
November 6	Norwich	Athletic Park; Burlington, VT	W 62–4	
