= P. J. McMahon =

P. J. McMahon may refer to:

- P. J. McMahon (American football) (1877–1913), American college football player and coach
- P. J. McMahon (politician) (1888–1939), American politician from Nebraska
