= Philadelphia Phillies all-time roster (L) =

List of baseball players

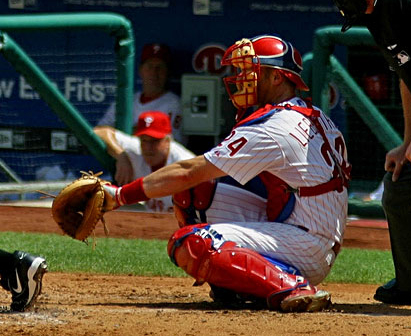
Catcher Mike Lieberthal was drafted in the first round by the Phillies in 1990, and went on to have a 13-season career with the team (1994–2006).

The Philadelphia Phillies are a Major League Baseball team based in Philadelphia, Pennsylvania. They are a member of the Eastern Division of Major League Baseball's National League. The team has played officially under two names since beginning play in 1883: the current moniker, as well as the "Quakers", which was used in conjunction with "Phillies" during the team's early history. The team was also known unofficially as the "Blue Jays" during the World War II era. Since the franchise's inception, 2,081 players have made an appearance in a competitive game for the team, whether as an offensive player (batting and baserunning) or a defensive player (fielding, pitching, or both).

Of those 2,081 Phillies, 101 have had surnames beginning with the letter L. One of those players, second baseman Nap Lajoie, has been inducted into the Baseball Hall of Fame; he played for Philadelphia for five seasons (1896–1900). Greg Luzinski is a member of the Philadelphia Baseball Wall of Fame; the left fielder played for the Phillies for 11 seasons, batting .281 and hitting 253 doubles.

Among the 56 batters in this list, catcher Mike Loan has the highest batting average, at .500; he hit safely in one of his two career at-bats with the Phillies. Other players with an average above .300 include Lajoie (.345), Ralph LaPointe (.308 in one season), Freddy Leach (.312 in six seasons), Dan Leahy (.333 in one season), Cliff W. Lee (.315 in four seasons), Greg Legg (.409 in two seasons), Jesse Levan (.444 in one season), Jim Lindeman (.313 in two seasons), and Kenny Lofton (.335 in one season). Luzinski leads all members of this list with 223 home runs and 811 runs batted in.

Of this list's 46 pitchers, the best win–loss record, in terms of winning percentage, is shared by three pitchers: Bobby Locke, who won one game in three seasons (1962–1964) with the Phillies; Kyle Lohse, who went 3–0 in 2007; and Marcelino López, who posted a 1–0 record during the 1963 season. Jim Lonborg's 75 victories and 60 defeats are tops in both of those statistical categories, and he also leads in strikeouts, with 551 in 7 seasons. In earned run average, Aquilino López is the leader; he averaged 2.13 earned runs per game in 2005.

Johnny Lush is one of the ten Phillies pitchers who have thrown a no-hitter, accomplishing the feat on May 1, 1906. Lush also made more than 30% of his career appearances with Philadelphia as a first baseman, batting .254 and amassing 53 extra-base hits.

Key to symbols in player list(s)
† or ‡	Indicates a member of the National Baseball Hall of Fame and Museum; ‡ indicates that the Phillies are the player's primary team^{[H]}
§	Indicates a member of the Philadelphia Baseball Wall of Fame
*	Indicates a team record^{[R]}
(#)	A number following a player's name indicates that the number was retired by the Phillies in the player's honor.
Year	Italic text indicates that the player is a member of the Phillies' active (25-man) roster.
Position(s)	Indicates the player's primary position(s)^{[P]}
Notes	Statistics shown only for playing time with Phillies^{[S]}
Ref	References

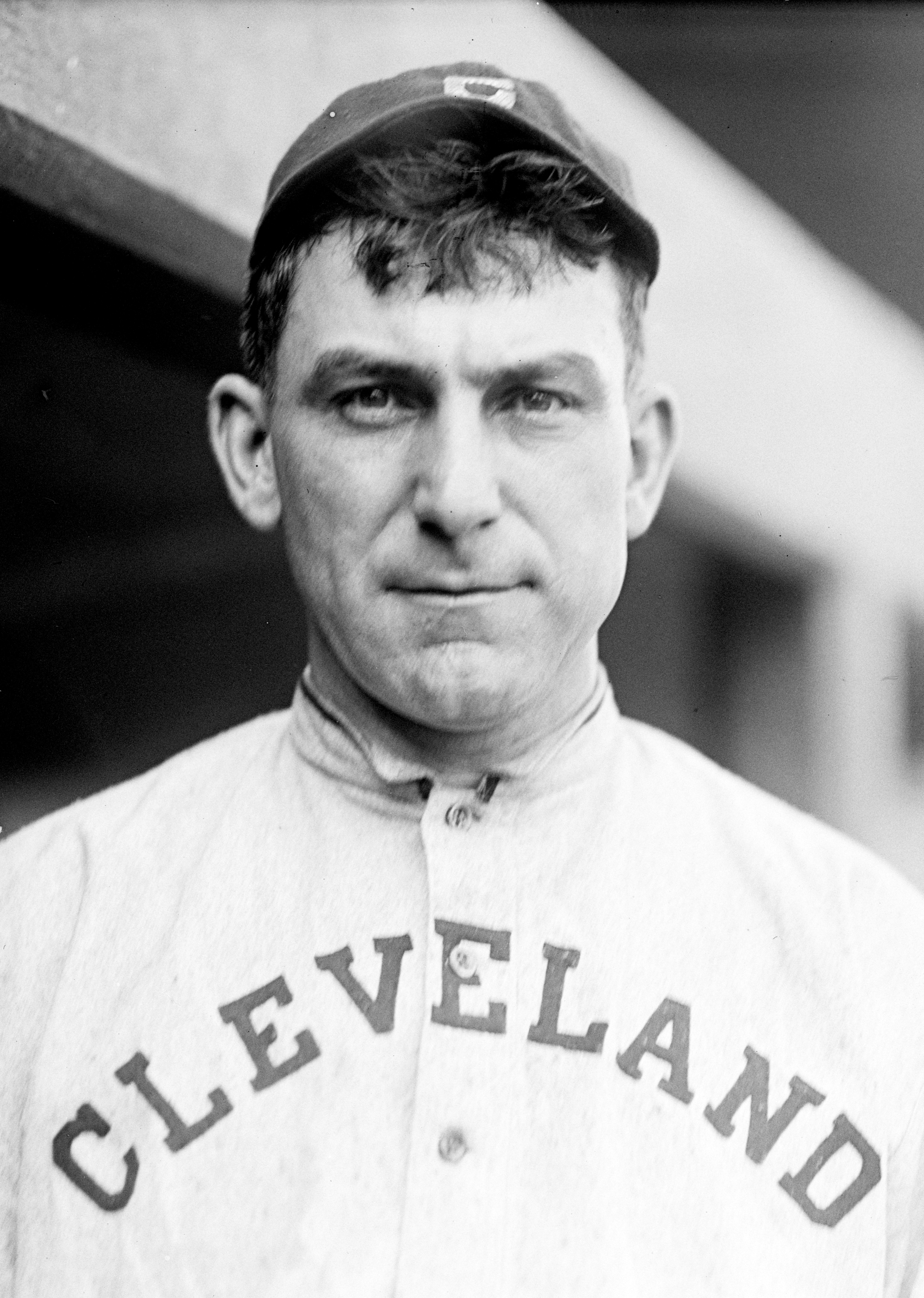
Hall of Fame second baseman Nap Lajoie batted .345 in his five seasons with Philadelphia.

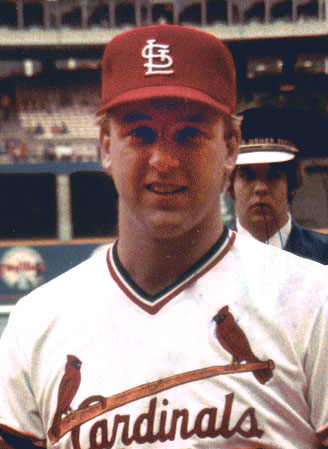
Dave LaPoint lost his only decision with the Phillies.

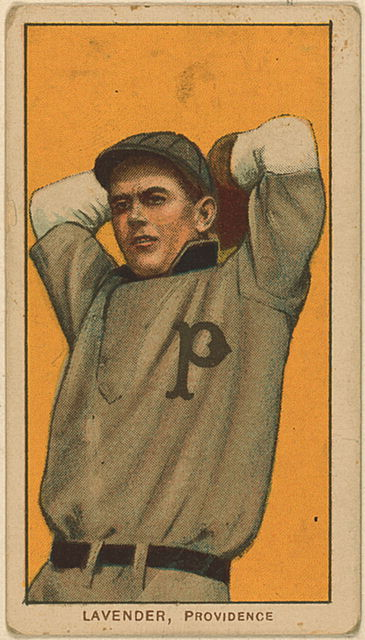
Jimmy Lavender played for the Phillies during the 1917 season.

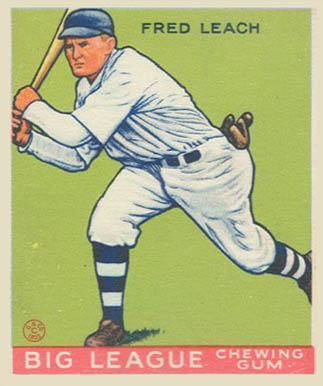
Freddy Leach hit 44 home runs in six seasons with Philadelphia.

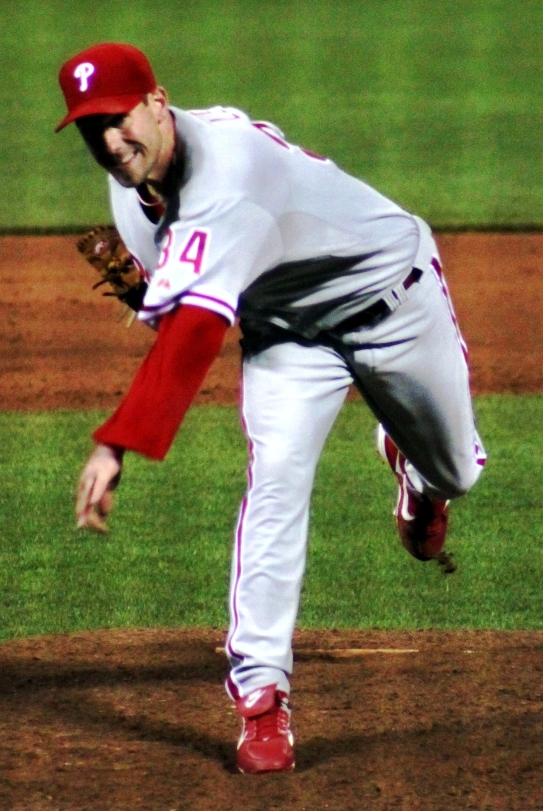
After arriving to the Phillies in mid-2009, Cliff P. Lee won four games for the team in the 2009 postseason.

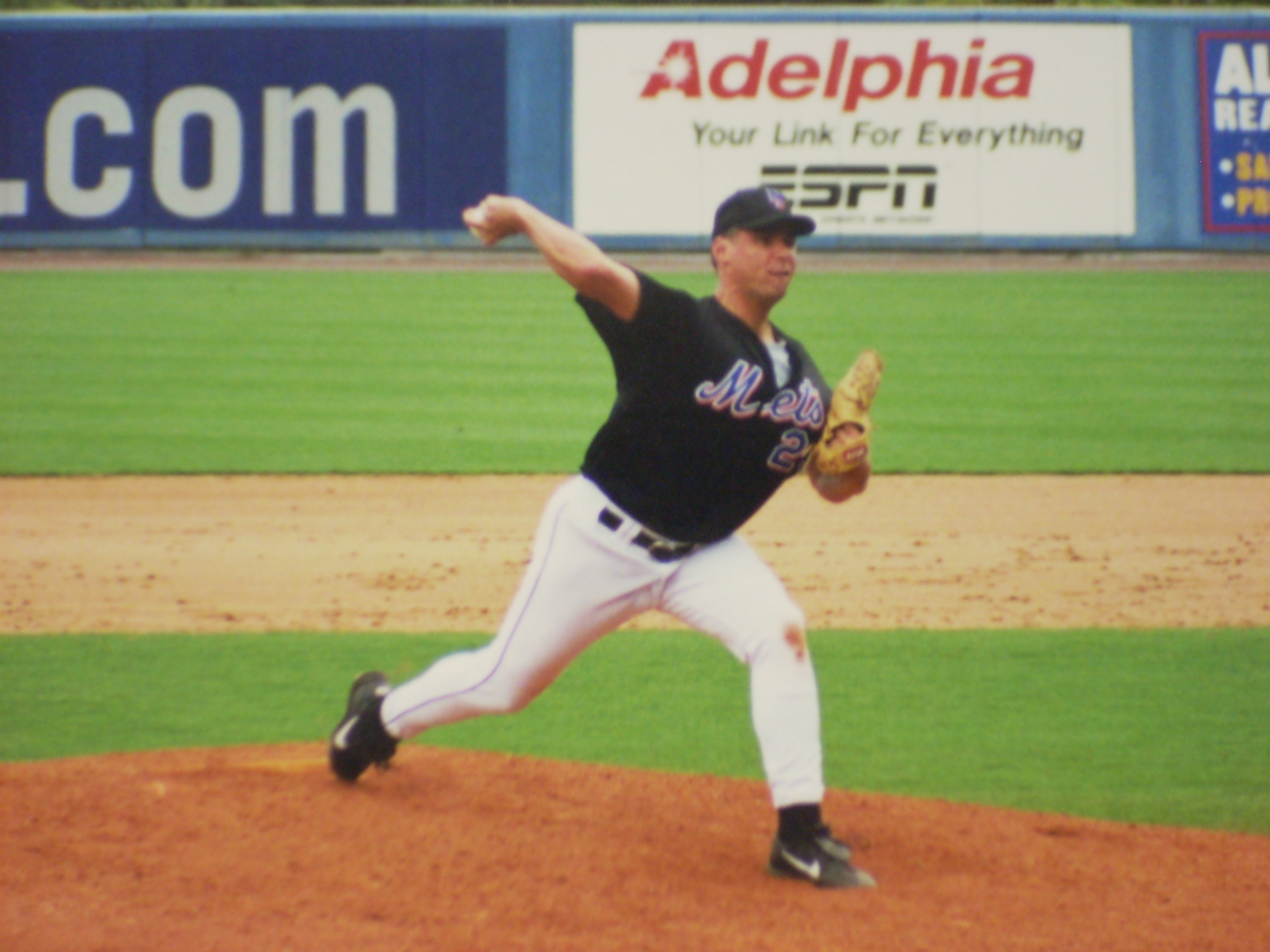
Mark Leiter struck out 232 batters in 2 seasons with the Phillies.

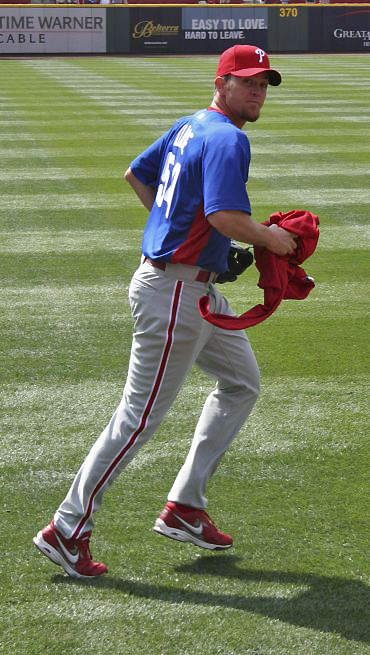
Through the close of the 2010 season, Brad Lidge collected 99 saves for Philadelphia, among the top 10 in team history.

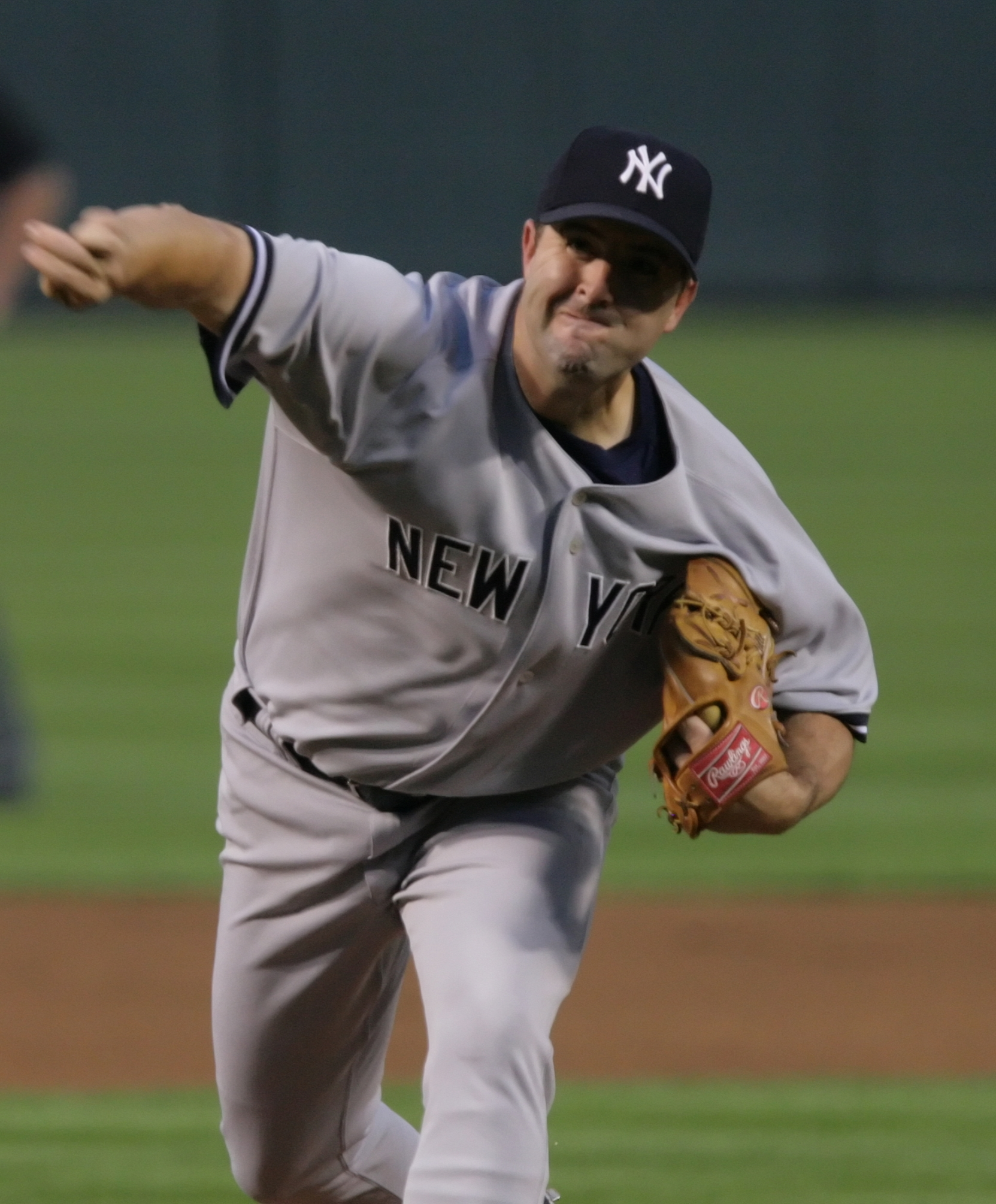
After being traded from the Phillies to the Yankees, Cory Lidle was killed in a 2006 plane crash.

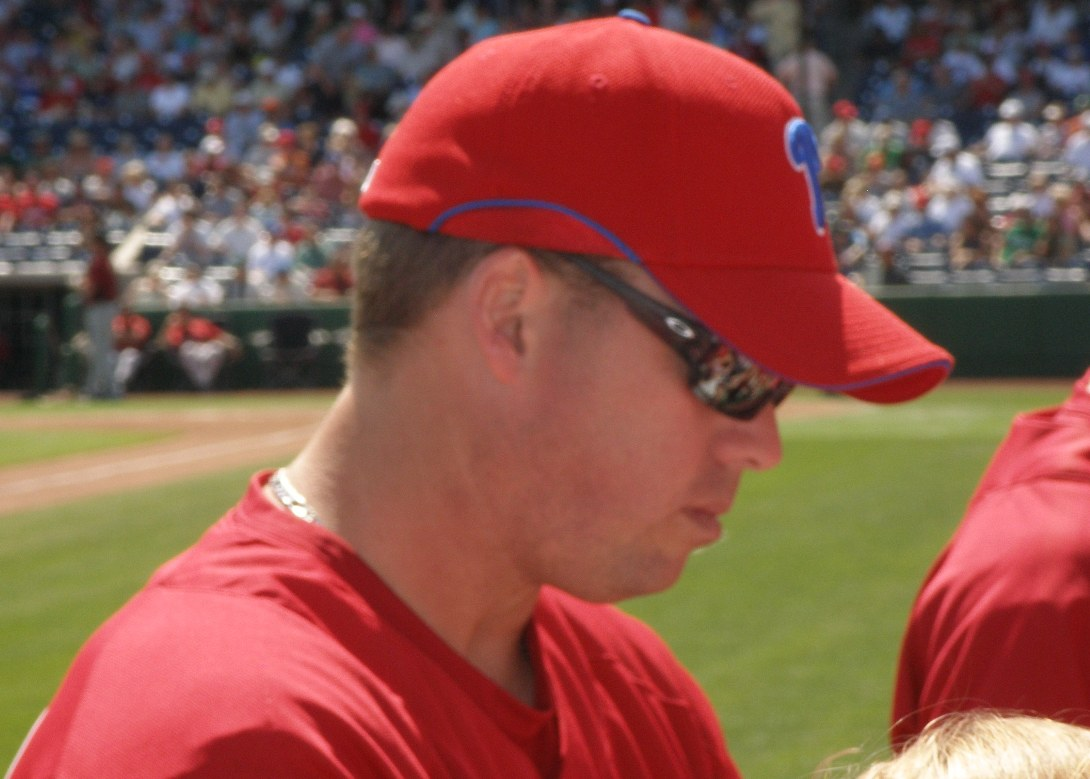
Jon Lieber was the Phillies' Opening Day starting pitcher in 2005 and 2006.

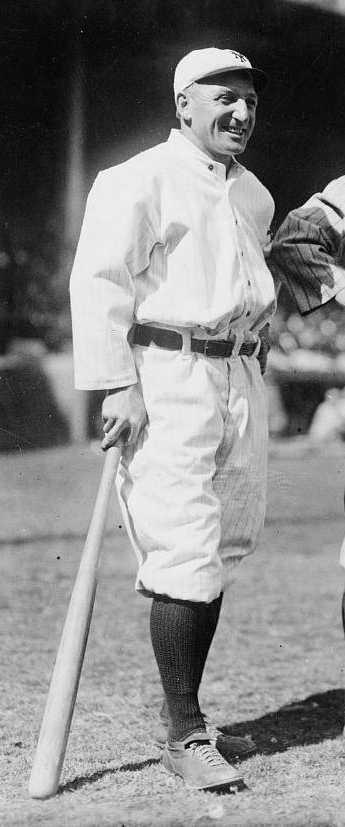
Hans Lobert played for Philadelphia from 1911 to 1914, and then managed the club in 1938.

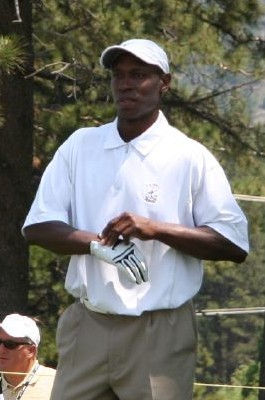
Kenny Lofton was the Phillies' center fielder in 2005.

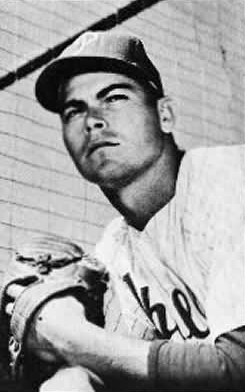
Jack Lohrke batted .190 in two seasons with Philadelphia.

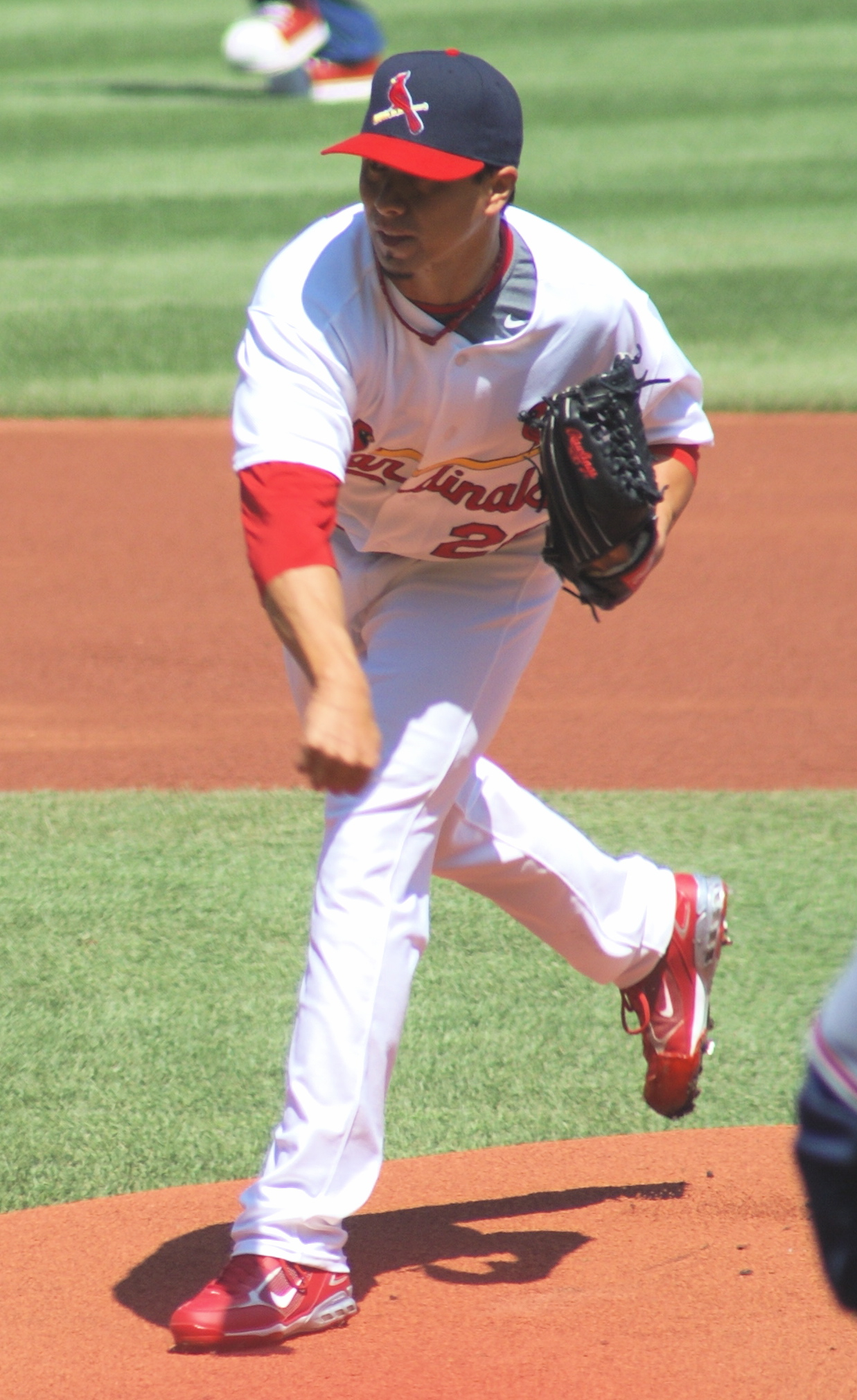
Kyle Lohse earned a perfect 3–0 record in his Phillies tenure.

Herman Long collected one hit as a Phillie.

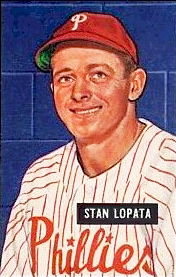
Stan Lopata batted in 393 runs in an 11-season career with Philadelphia.

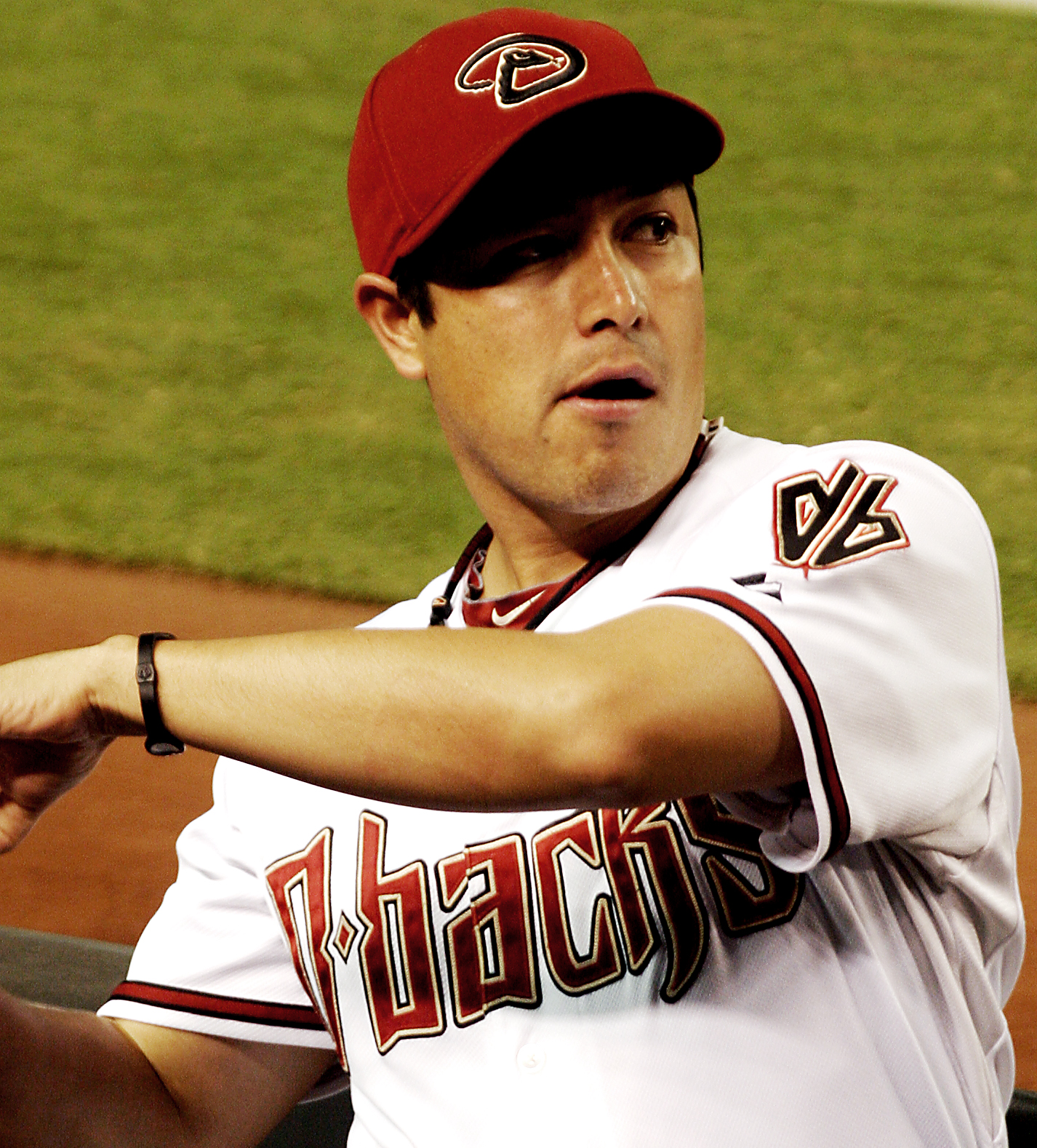
Rodrigo López struck out 19 batters for the Phillies in 2009.

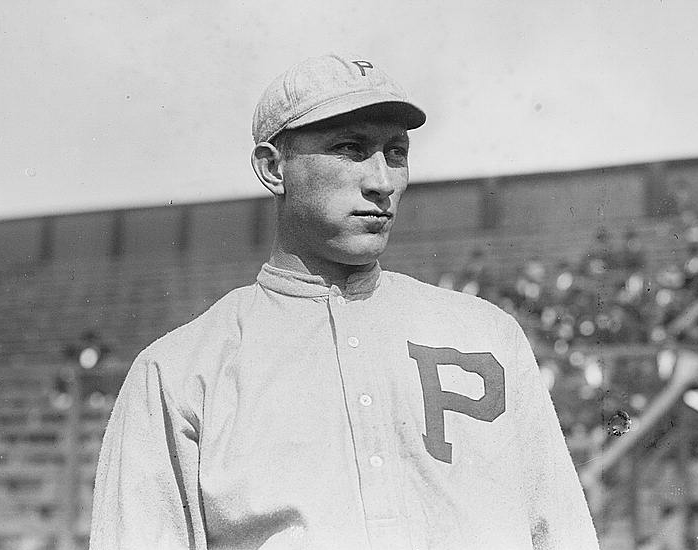
Fred Luderus had an 11-season career with the Phillies, hitting 83 home runs.

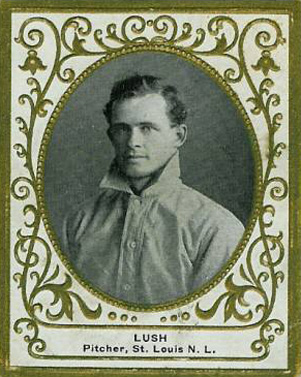
Johnny Lush, who appeared in 30% of his contests as both a pitcher and a first baseman, threw a no-hitter in 1906.

List of players whose surnames begin with L, showing season(s) and position(s) played and selected statistics
Name	Season(s)	Position(s)	Notes	Ref
Pete Laforest	2007	Pinch hitter^{[a]}	.091 batting average; 1 hit; 1 run batted in	
Lerrin LaGrow	1980	Pitcher	0–2 record; 4.15 earned run average; 21 strikeouts	
Nap Lajoie^{†}	1896–1900	Second baseman	.345 batting average; 32 home runs; 458 runs batted in	
Steve Lake	1989–1992	Catcher	.242 batting average; 4 home runs; 33 runs batted in	
Al Lakeman	1947–1948	Catcher; First baseman	.160 batting average; 7 home runs; 23 runs batted in	
Wayne LaMaster	1937–1938	Pitcher	19–26 record; 5.86 earned run average; 170 strikeouts	
Gene Lambert	1941–1942	Pitcher	0–1 record; 2.70 earned run average; 4 strikeouts	
Henry Lampe	1895	Pitcher	0–2 record; 7.57 earned run average; 18 strikeouts	
Don Landrum	1957	Center fielder	.143 batting average; 1 double; 1 run scored	
Tom Lanning	1938	Pitcher	0–1 record; 6.43 earned run average; 2 strikeouts	
Andy Lapihuska	1942–1943	Pitcher	0–2 record; 7.04 earned run average; 8 strikeouts	
Dave LaPoint	1991	Pitcher	0–1 record; 16.20 earned run average; 3 strikeouts	
Ralph LaPointe	1947	Shortstop	.308 batting average; 1 home runs; 15 runs batted in	
Dan Larson	1978–1981	Pitcher	4–6 record; 3.75 earned run average; 43 strikeouts	
Billy Lauder	1898–1899	Third baseman	.266 batting average; 49 extra-base hits; 157 runs batted in	
Mike LaValliere	1984	Catcher	.000 batting average; 2 walks; 9 plate appearances	
Jimmy Lavender	1917	Pitcher	6–8 record; 3.55 earned run average; 52 strikeouts	
Bill Laxton	1970	Pitcher	13.50 earned run average; 2 strikeouts; 2 walks	
Freddy Leach	1923–1928	Center fielder Left fielder	.312 batting average; 44 home runs; 301 runs batted in	
Dan Leahy	1896	Shortstop	.333 batting average; 1 double; 1 run batted in	
Bevo LeBourveau	1919–1922	Left fielder	.275 batting average; 11 home runs; 67 runs batted in	
Ricky Ledée	2002–2004	Center fielder Left fielder	.248 batting average; 28 home runs; 95 runs batted in	
Bill Lee	1943–1945	Pitcher	14–22 record; 3.74 earned run average; 80 strikeouts	
Cliff P. Lee	2009; 2011	Pitcher	24–12 record; 2.65 earned run average; 312 strikeouts	
Cliff W. Lee	1921–1924	Left fielder	.315 batting average; 33 home runs; 160 runs batted in	
Hal Lee	1931–1933	Left fielder	.288 batting average; 20 home runs; 109 runs batted in	
Travis Lee	2000–2002	First baseman	.258 batting average; 34 home runs; 174 runs batted in	
Joe Lefebvre	1983–1984; 1986	Right fielder	.280 batting average; 11 home runs; 56 runs batted in	
Greg Legg	1986–1987	Second baseman	.409 batting average; 1 double; 1 run batted in	
Ken Lehman	1961	Pitcher	1–1 record; 4.26 earned run average; 27 strikeouts	
Clarence Lehr	1911	Second baseman Shortstop	.148 batting average; 2 runs batted in; 2 runs scored	
Dave Leiper	1996	Pitcher	2–0 record; 6.43 earned run average; 10 strikeouts	
Mark Leiter	1997–1998	Pitcher	17–22 record; 4.98 earned run average; 232 strikeouts	
Jim Lemon	1963	Left fielder	.271 batting average; 2 home runs; 6 runs batted in	
Ed Lennon	1928	Pitcher	8.76 earned run average; 6 strikeouts; 10 walks	
Izzy León	1945	Pitcher	0–4 record; 5.35 earned run average; 11 strikeouts	
Dutch Leonard	1947–1948	Pitcher	29–29 record; 2.60 earned run average; 195 strikeouts	
Ted Lepcio	1960	Third baseman	.227 batting average; 2 home runs; 8 runs batted in	
Randy Lerch	1975–1980; 1986	Pitcher	36–42 record; 4.46 earned run average; 339 strikeouts	
Walt Lerian	1928–1929	Catcher	.246 batting average; 8 home runs; 50 runs batted in	
Barry Lersch	1969–1973	Pitcher	18–32 record; 3.73 earned run average; 317 strikeouts	
Roy Leslie	1922	First baseman	.271 batting average; 6 home runs; 50 runs batted in	
Charlie Letchas	1939; 1944; 1946	Second baseman	.236 batting average; 1 home run; 36 runs batted in	
Jesse Levan	1947	Left fielder	.444 batting average; 1 run batted in; 3 runs scored	
Ed Levy	1940	Pinch hitter^{[b]}	.000 batting average; 1 plate appearance	
Bert Lewis	1924	Pitcher	6.00 earned run average; 3 strikeouts; 7 walks	
Fred Lewis	1883	Center fielder	.250 batting average; 7 doubles; 18 runs batted in	
Mark Lewis	1998	Second baseman	.249 batting average; 9 home runs; 54 runs batted in	
Sixto Lezcano	1983–1984	Right fielder	.278 batting average; 14 home runs; 47 runs batted in	
Brad Lidge	2008–2011	Pitcher	3–11 record; 3.73 earned run average; 228 strikeouts; 100 saves	
Cory Lidle	2004–2006	Pitcher	26–20 record; 4.50 earned run average; 252 strikeouts	
Jon Lieber	2005–2007	Pitcher	29–30 record; 4.55 earned run average; 303 strikeouts	
Mike Lieberthal	1994–2006	Catcher	.275 batting average; 150 home runs; 609 runs batted in	
Johnny Lindell	1953	Pitcher	1–1 record; 4.24 earned run average; 16 strikeouts	
Jim Lindeman	1991–1992	Left fielder Right fielder	.313 batting average; 1 home run; 18 runs batted in	
Doug Lindsey	1991; 1993	Catcher	.200 batting average; 4 strikeouts; 5 plate appearances	
Phil Linz	1966–1967	Third baseman Shortstop	.205 batting average; 1 home run; 11 runs batted in	
Frank Linzy	1974	Pitcher	3–2 record; 3.28 earned run average; 12 strikeouts	
Angelo LiPetri	1956; 1958	Pitcher	5.40 earned run average; 9 strikeouts; 3 walks	
Tom Lipp	1897	Pitcher	0–1 record; 15.00 earned run average; 1 strikeout	
Pedro Liriano	2005	Pitcher	10.57 earned run average; 6 strikeouts; 6 walks	
Joe Lis	1970–1972	Left fielder First baseman	.223 batting average; 13 home runs; 32 runs batted in	
Ad Liska	1932–1933	Pitcher	5–1 record; 3.78 earned run average; 29 strikeouts	
Danny Litwhiler	1940–1943	Left fielder	.291 batting average; 37 home runs; 156 runs batted in	
Mickey Livingston	1941–1943	Catcher	.221 batting average; 5 home runs; 58 runs batted in	
Mike Loan	1912	Catcher	.500 batting average; 1 run scored; 2 plate appearances	
Hans Lobert	1911–1914	Third baseman	.293 batting average; 19 home runs; 212 runs batted in	
Don Lock	1967–1969	Center fielder	.232 batting average; 22 home runs; 85 runs batted in	
Bobby Locke	1962–1964	Pitcher	1–0 record; 4.53 earned run average; 27 strikeouts	
Carlton Loewer	1998–1999	Pitcher	9–14 record; 5.68 earned run average; 106 strikeouts	
Kenny Lofton	2005	Center fielder	.335 batting average; 2 home runs; 36 runs batted in	
Jack Lohrke	1952–1953	Shortstop	.190 batting average; 1 run batted in; 7 runs scored	
Bill Lohrman	1934	Pitcher	0–1 record; 4.50 earned run average; 2 strikeouts	
Kyle Lohse	2007	Pitcher	3–0 record; 4.72 earned run average; 32 strikeouts	
Jim Lonborg	1973–1979	Pitcher	75–60 record; 3.98 earned run average; 548 strikeouts	
Herman Long	1904	Second baseman	.250 batting average; 1 hit; 4 plate appearances	
Tony Longmire	1993–1995	Left fielder	.285 batting average; 3 home runs; 37 runs batted in	
Joe Lonnett	1956–1959	Catcher	.166 batting average; 6 home runs; 27 runs batted in	
Stan Lopata	1948–1958	Catcher	.257 batting average; 116 home runs; 393 runs batted in	
Art Lopatka	1946	Pitcher	0–1 record; 16.88 earned run average; 4 strikeouts	
Aquilino López	2005	Pitcher	0–1 record; 2.13 earned run average; 16 strikeouts	
Marcelino López	1963	Pitcher	1–0 record; 6.00 earned run average; 2 strikeouts	
Rodrigo López	2009	Pitcher	3–1 record; 5.70 earned run average; 19 strikeouts	
Carlton Lord	1923	Third baseman	.234 batting average; 2 runs batted in; 3 runs scored	
Larry Loughlin	1967	Pitcher	15.19 earned run average; 5 strikeouts; 4 walks	
Lynn Lovenguth	1955	Pitcher	0–1 record; 4.50 earned run average; 14 strikeouts	
Jay Loviglio	1980	Second baseman	.000 batting average; 7 runs scored; 6 plate appearances	
Torey Lovullo	1999	First baseman Second baseman	.211 batting average; 2 home runs; 5 runs batted in	
Peanuts Lowrey	1955	Right fielder	.189 batting average; 8 runs batted in; 9 runs scored	
Fred Lucas	1935	Left fielder Center fielder Right fielder	.265 batting average; 2 runs batted in; 1 run scored	
Con Lucid	1895–1896	Pitcher	7–7 record; 6.85 earned run average; 22 strikeouts	
Lou Lucier	1944–1945	Pitcher	0–1 record; 3.22 earned run average; 6 strikeouts	
Fred Luderus	1910–1920	First baseman	.278 batting average; 83 home runs; 630 runs batted in	
Al Lukens	1894	Pitcher	0–1 record; 10.20 earned run average; 10 walks	
Tony Lupien	1944–1945	First baseman	.286 batting average; 5 home runs; 55 runs batted in	
Johnny Lush	1904–1907	First baseman Pitcher	.268 batting average; 63 runs batted in; 23–26 record; 2.56 earned run average	
Greg Luzinski^{§}	1970–1980	Left fielder	.281 batting average; 223 home runs; 811 runs batted in	
Sparky Lyle	1980–1982	Pitcher	12–9 record; 4.37 earned run average; 47 strikeouts	
Tom Lynch	1884–1885	Left fielder Center fielder	.248 batting average; 9 extra-base hits; 4 runs batted in	
Harry Lyons	1887	Left fielder	.000 batting average; 1 walk; 5 plate appearances	
Terry Lyons	1929	First baseman	0 plate appearances^{[c]}	

== Footnotes ==
Key

- ^{H} The National Baseball Hall of Fame and Museum determines which cap a player wears on their plaque, signifying "the team with which he made his most indelible mark". The Hall of Fame considers the player's wishes in making their decision, but the Hall makes the final decision as "it is important that the logo be emblematic of the historical accomplishments of that player's career".
- ^{P} Players are listed at a position if they appeared in 30% of their games or more during their Phillies career, as defined by Baseball-Reference. Additional positions may be shown on the Baseball-Reference website by following each player's citation.
- ^{R} Franchise batting and pitching leaders are drawn from Baseball-Reference. A total of 1,500 plate appearances are needed to qualify for batting records, and 500 innings pitched or 50 decisions are required to qualify for pitching records.
- ^{S} Statistics are correct as of the end of the 2010 Major League Baseball season.

List

- ^{a} Pete Laforest is listed by Baseball-Reference as a catcher, but never appeared in a game in the field for the Phillies.
- ^{b} Ed Levy is listed by Baseball-Reference as a left fielder and first baseman, but never appeared in a game in the field for the Phillies.
- ^{c} Terry Lyons entered one game as a defensive replacement and did not bat.
