= Denny Lambert (athletic director) =

American athletics administrator

Biographical details
- Born: c. 1929

Playing career

Football
- c. 1953: Vermont

Track
- c. 1953: Vermont

Coaching career (HC unless noted)

Football
- 1956–1960: Winooski HS (VT)
- c. 1965: Vermont (assistant)

Skiing
- 1970–1972: Vermont

Administrative career (AD unless noted)
- 1969–1973: Vermont (assistant AD)
- 1973–1992: Vermont

Denis Lambert (born c. 1929) is an American former athletics coach and administrator. He served as the athletic director at the University of Vermont from 1973 to 1992.

In 2018, he was inducted into the University of Vermont Athletic Hall of Fame.
