= List of Milwaukee Brewers managers =

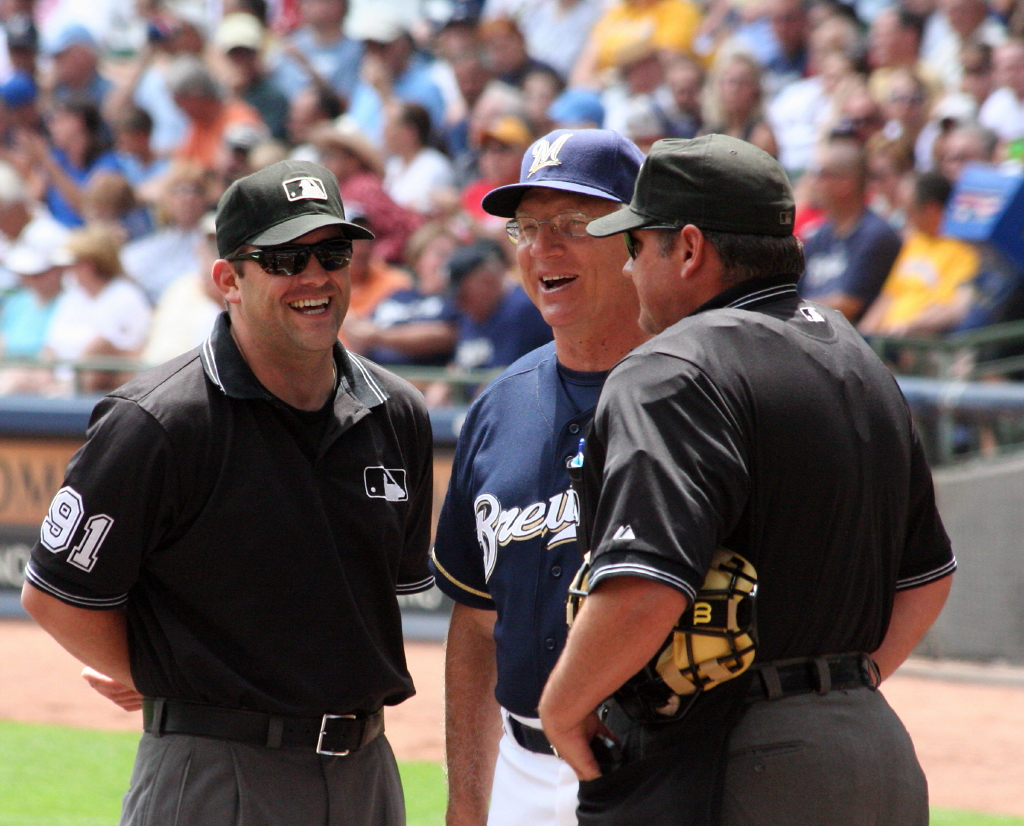
Manager Ken Macha (center) meeting with the umpires before a game

The Milwaukee Brewers Major League Baseball (MLB) franchise of the National League (NL) has employed 20 managers during its 57 seasons of play. Managers are responsible for team strategy and leadership on and off the field, including determining the batting order, arranging defensive positioning, and making tactical decisions regarding pitching changes, pinch-hitting, pinch-running, and defensive replacements. Established in Seattle, Washington, as the Seattle Pilots in 1969, the team became the Milwaukee Brewers after relocating to Milwaukee, Wisconsin, in 1970. The franchise played in the American League (AL) until 1998, when it moved to the National League in conjunction with a major league realignment. Pat Murphy has been the Brewers' manager since the 2024 season.

Six managers have led the Brewers to the postseason. Buck Rodgers' 1981 team won the Second Half AL East Division title. In 1982, Harvey Kuenn took over for Rodgers and led Milwaukee to win the AL East Division title and the AL Championship Series, but they lost in their only World Series appearance. Dale Sveum, who assumed control of the team late in the 2008 season from Ned Yost, led the club to an NL Wild Card. Ron Roenicke's 2011 Brewers won the NL Central Division title and the NL Division Series (NLDS). The teams led by Craig Counsell won the NL Central Division title (2018, 2021, and 2023), the NLDS (2018), and two NL Wild Card spots (2019 and 2020). Pat Murphy has managed the Brewers to three Central Division titles (2024, 2025, and 2026).

Pat Murphy (2024) is the only Milwaukee manager to win the Major League Baseball Manager of the Year Award since its institution in 1983. Three have won the Sporting News Manager of the Year Award: George Bamberger (1978), Craig Counsell (2017, 2018, and 2023), and Pat Murphy (2024).

Craig Counsell won 707 regular-season games from 2015 to 2023, placing him first on the all-time wins list for Brewers managers. Having managed the team for 1,332 games over nine seasons, he is the longest-tenured manager in team history. The manager with the highest winning percentage over a full season or more is Pat Murphy (2024–present), with .603. Conversely, the lowest winning percentage over a season or more is .395 by Joe Schultz (1969).

== History ==
Playing in the American League (AL), the Seattle Pilots were managed by former St. Louis Cardinals coach Joe Schultz in their inaugural 1969 season. Schultz' .395 winning percentage is the lowest among all Brewers managers who managed a full season or more. He was replaced by former Cincinnati Reds manager Dave Bristol when the team relocated to Milwaukee as the Milwaukee Brewers in 1970. Bristol remained with the team until being dismissed on May 28, 1972. Third base coach Roy McMillan filled in on an interim basis for two games before Triple-A Evansville Triplets manager Del Crandall was brought up to finish the season. Crandall was released on September 28, 1975, with one game left to play. Hitting coach Harvey Kuenn managed the season finale that day. Alex Grammas, a coach for the 1975 World Series champion Reds, next served as Brewers manager from 1976 to 1977. Baltimore Orioles pitching coach George Bamberger came on as skipper in 1978. He was selected to win the Sporting News Manager of the Year Award in his first season. Bamberger suffered a heart attack during spring training in 1980 and had five coronary bypasses that March. Third base coach Buck Rodgers served as acting manager until Bamberger returned on June 6. He retired on September 7 to take up a job in player development with the Brewers. Rogers finished out the season as manager.

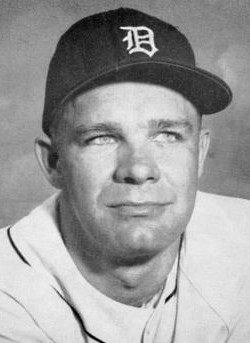
Harvey Kuenn led the Brewers to the 1982 World Series, their first World Series appearance.

Continuing as Milwaukee's skipper in 1981, Buck Rodgers led the team to their first postseason appearance by winning the Second Half AL East Division title. They were eliminated in the American League Division Series by the New York Yankees. Rodgers was dismissed on June 2, 1982, and replaced by hitting coach Harvey Kuenn. The 1982 Brewers captured the AL East Division title before winning the American League Championship Series over the California Angels. Kuenn's Brewers were defeated in the World Series by St. Louis. Kuenn returned to lead the team in 1983, but they were unable to make it three postseason appearances in a row. Over parts of three seasons as manager, Kuenn accumulated a .576 winning percentage, the highest among all Brewers managers over a full season or more.

Former Seattle Mariners manager Rene Lachemann managed the club in 1984. George Bamberger returned to managed Milwaukee in 1985. He retired for the second time on September 25, 1986. Third base coach Tom Trebelhorn managed the last nine games of the season and remained in the position through 1991. Phil Garner became the team's manager in 1992. In 1998, Milwaukee transferred to the National League (NL) as a part of Major League Baseball's realignment for that season. Garner remained with the Brewers until being dismissed on August 12, 1999. Hitting coach Jim Lefebvre managed the rest of the 1999 season on an interim basis.

Davey Lopes, previously the San Diego Padres' first base coach became manager of the Brewers in 2000. He was fired on April 18, 2002, fifteen games into the season. He was succeeded by bench coach Jerry Royster as interim manager for the remainder of the year. Ned Yost, who had been the Atlanta Braves' third base coach, was hired as the Brewers' manager for 2003. With the team in a race for the NL Central Division title, Yost was fired on September 15, 2008, with 12 games left to play. Third base coach Dale Sveum served on an interim basis for the rest of the campaign. Under Sveum, the Brewers won the 2008 NL Wild Card, but lost the National League Division Series (NLDS) versus the Philadelphia Phillies. Ken Macha managed the club for the 2009 and 2010 seasons but could not lead the team back to the playoffs.

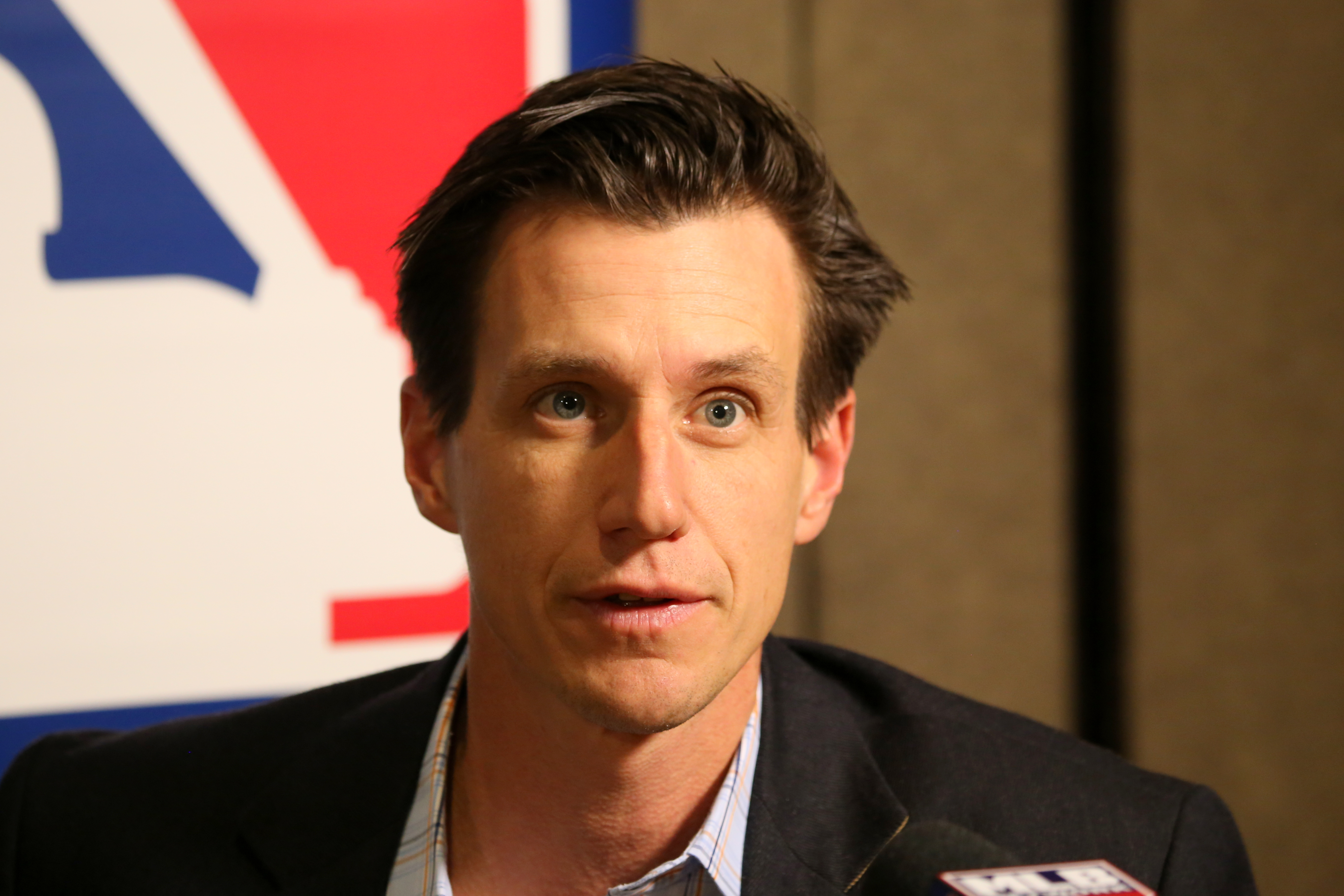
Craig Counsell led the Brewers to five postseason appearances between 2015 and 2023.

Ron Roenicke, the Los Angeles Angels' bench coach, was hired as the Brewers' new manager in 2011. He led Milwaukee to win the 2011 NL Central Division title, their first division crown since 1982. They won the NLDS over the Arizona Diamondbacks but were eliminated from the postseason by St. Louis in the National League Championship Series (NLCS). Roenicke remained manager until his dismissal on May 3, 2015, following a 7–18 start to the season.

Former Brewers infielder and special assistant to the general manager Craig Counsell was selected as Roenicke's replacement. Counsell led Milwaukee to five postseason appearances, more than any other manager in franchise history. The 2018 NL Central Division champion Brewers won the NLDS over the Colorado Rockies but lost the NLCS to the Los Angeles Dodgers Milwaukee returned to the playoffs the next season but lost the 2019 National League Wild Card Game against the Washington Nationals. The 2020 team lost the NL Wild Card Series to the Dodgers. Counsell won the Sporting News Manager of the Year Award in 2017 and 2018. He led the Brewers to the 2021 NL Central Division title, but they lost the NLDS versus the Atlanta Braves. The 2023 Brewers won the NL Central Division title but were eliminated in the NL Wild Card Series by Arizona. Over nine seasons as manager, Counsell won 707 regular-season games, placing him first on the all-time wins list for Brewers managers. Having managed the team for 1,332 games, he is also the longest-tenured manager in team history. Counsell left the Brewers to become manager of the Chicago Cubs after the 2023 season.

Pat Murphy, who had been Milwaukee's bench coach since 2016, was selected as Counsell's successor. He led the Brewers to win the 2024 NL Central Division title, but they were eliminated by the New York Mets in the NL Wild Card Series. After the season, he was selected for the Major League Baseball Manager of the Year Award, a first for any Brewers manager.

== Managers ==
Key
No.	A running total of the number of Brewers managers
G	Regular season games managed
W	Regular season wins
L	Regular season losses
T	Regular season ties
Win %	Regular season winning percentage
PA	Playoff appearances: number of years the manager has led the franchise to the playoffs
PW	Playoff wins
PL	Playoff losses
LC	League championships: number of league championships, or pennants, achieved by the manager
WS	World Series championships: number of World Series victories achieved by the manager

Managers
No.	Manager	Season(s)	G	W	L	T	Win %	PA	PW	PL	LC	WS	Ref.
1	Joe Schultz	1969	163	64	98	1	.395	—	—	—	—	—	
2	Dave Bristol	1970–1972	354	144	209	1	.408	—	—	—	—	—	
3	Roy McMillan	1972	2	1	1	—	.500	—	—	—	—	—	
4	Del Crandall	1972–1975	609	271	338	—	.445	—	—	—	—	—	
5	Harvey Kuenn	1975	1	1	0	—	1.000	—	—	—	—	—	
6	Alex Grammas	1976–1977	323	133	190	—	.412	—	—	—	—	—	
7	George Bamberger	1978–1980	415	235	180	—	.566	—	—	—	—	—	
8	Buck Rodgers	1980–1982	226	124	102	—	.549	1	2	3	0	0	
—	Harvey Kuenn	1982–1983	278	159	118	1	.574	1	6	6	1	0	
9	Rene Lachemann	1984	161	67	94	—	.416	—	—	—	—	—	
—	George Bamberger	1985–1986	313	142	171	—	.454	—	—	—	—	—	
10	Tom Trebelhorn	1986–1991	819	422	397	—	.515	—	—	—	—	—	
11	Phil Garner	1992–1999	1,180	563	617	—	.477	—	—	—	—	—	
12	Jim Lefebvre	1999	49	22	27	—	.449	—	—	—	—	—	
13	Davey Lopes	2000–2002	340	144	195	1	.425	—	—	—	—	—	
14	Jerry Royster	2002	147	53	94	—	.361	—	—	—	—	—	
15	Ned Yost	2003–2008	959	457	502	—	.477	—	—	—	—	—	
16	Dale Sveum	2008	12	7	5	—	.583	1	1	3	0	0	
17	Ken Macha	2009–2010	324	157	167	—	.485	—	—	—	—	—	
18	Ron Roenicke	2011–2015	673	342	331	—	.508	1	5	6	0	0	
19	Craig Counsell	2015–2023	1,332	707	625	—	.531	5	7	12	0	0	
20	Pat Murphy	2024–present	486	293	193	—	.603	3	15	10	1	1	
Totals	20 managers	57 seasons	9,166	4,508	4,654	4	.492	11	25	36	2	1	—

Managers with multiple tenures
No.	Manager	Season(s)	G	W	L	T	Win %	PA	PW	PL	LC	WS	Ref.
5	Harvey Kuenn	1975, 1982–1983	279	160	118	1	.576	1	6	6	1	0	
7	George Bamberger	1978–1980, 1985–1986	728	377	351	0	.518	—	—	—	—	—	
