= Sam Perlozzo =

American baseball player, coach, and manager (born 1951)

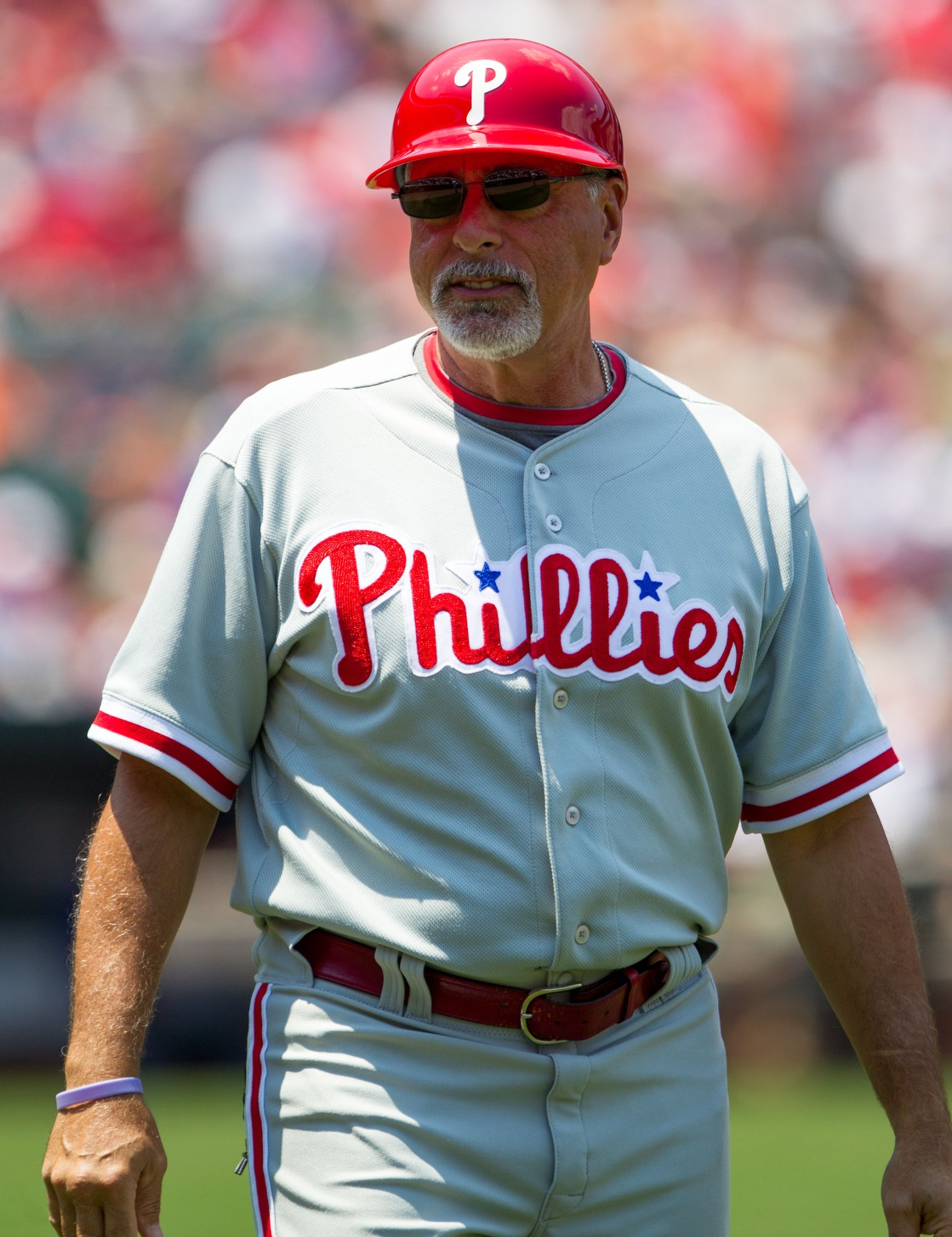
- Perlozzo as Phillies first base coach, 2012
- Second baseman / Manager
- Born: March 4, 1951 (age 75); Cumberland, Maryland, U.S.
- Batted: Right Threw: Right

MLB debut
- September 13, 1977, for the Minnesota Twins

Last MLB appearance
- September 13, 1979, for the San Diego Padres

MLB statistics
- Batting average: .269
- Hits: 7
- Runs: 6
- Games: 300
- Managerial record: 128–172
- Winning %: .427

NPB statistics
- Batting average: .281
- Home runs: 15
- Runs batted in: 43
- Stats at Baseball Reference
- Managerial record at Baseball Reference

Teams
- As player: Minnesota Twins (1977); San Diego Padres (1979); Yakult Swallows (1980); As manager: Baltimore Orioles (2005–2007); As coach: New York Mets (1987–1989); Cincinnati Reds (1990–1992); Seattle Mariners (1993–1995); Baltimore Orioles (1996–2005); Seattle Mariners (2008); Philadelphia Phillies (2009–2012)

Career highlights and awards
- World Series champion (1990)

Samuel Benedict Perlozzo (/pərˈlɒzoʊ/ pər-LOZ-oh; born March 4, 1951) is an American former second baseman, manager, and coach in Major League Baseball (MLB). He managed the Baltimore Orioles from 2005 to 2007 and recently served as the first base coach for the Philadelphia Phillies from 2009 to 2012.

== Biography ==
After graduating from Bishop Walsh School in Cumberland, Maryland, Perlozzo was drafted by the Twins after playing college ball at George Washington University. His professional baseball career included parts of two seasons as a reserve with the Minnesota Twins and San Diego Padres, along with one season with the Yakult Swallows in 1980.

Going into the last game of the 1977 season Perlozzo's teammate, Rod Carew, had 99 RBIs. Perlozzo started the game at shortstop in place of Roy Smalley, and just as Perlozzo was about to bat for the first time in the game, manager Gene Mauch grabbed him by the arm and said, "I want you to go up there and hit a triple, right now, this at-bat. You hit a triple, understand?" Perlozzo did hit a triple, and Carew hit a single to gain his 100th RBI of the season.

With the Orioles, he was promoted from bench coach to interim manager after manager Lee Mazzilli was fired on August 4, 2005, during the team's worst losing streak of the season. The Orioles went 23–32 under Perlozzo that season. On October 12, the "interim" title was dropped as Perlozzo was named the team's manager. In 2006, Perlozzo's first full season as manager of the Orioles, the team finished with a 70–92 record.

Orioles owner Peter Angelos fired Perlozzo as the team's manager on June 18, 2007. Perlozzo was replaced by bullpen coach Dave Trembley on an interim basis then, after some success, had the interim tag removed.

On November 5, 2007, the Seattle Mariners announced that Perlozzo had been hired as their third base coach.

In 2009, Perlozzo was hired by the Philadelphia Phillies to be the team's third base coach. He was moved to first base coach for the 2011 season after former Orioles manager Juan Samuel joined the Phillies staff as third base coach. On October 3, 2012, Perlozzo was dismissed by the Phillies.

== Managerial record ==
Team	Year	Regular season				Postseason			
Team	Year	Won	Lost	Win %	Finish	Won	Lost	Win %	Result
BAL	2005	23	32	.418	4th in AL East	–	–	–	–
BAL	2006	70	92	.432	4th in AL East	–	–	–	–
BAL	2007	29	40	.420	fired				
Total		128	172	.427		0	0	–	–

== See also ==
Preceded by Rich Miller	Little Falls Mets Manager; 1982	Succeeded by Mike Cubbage
Preceded by Dan Monzon	Lynchburg Mets Manager; 1983	Succeeded by Mike Cubbage
Preceded by Bob Schaefer	Jackson Mets Manager; 1984–1985	Succeeded by Mike Cubbage
Preceded by Bob Schaefer	Tidewater Tide Manager; 1986	Succeeded by Mike Cubbage
Preceded by Bud Harrelson	New York Mets Third Base Coach; 1987–1989	Succeeded by Bud Harrelson
Preceded by Dave Bristol	Cincinnati Reds Third Base Coach; 1990–1992	Succeeded by Dave Bristol
Preceded by Marty Martínez	Seattle Mariners Third Base Coach; 1993–1995	Succeeded by John McLaren
Preceded by Steve Boros	Baltimore Orioles Third Base Coach; 1996–2000	Succeeded by Tom Trebelhorn
Preceded by Jeff Newman	Baltimore Orioles Bench Coach; 2001–2005	Succeeded by Tom Trebelhorn
Preceded by Carlos García	Seattle Mariners Third Base Coach; 2008	Succeeded by Bruce Hines
Preceded by Steve Smith	Philadelphia Phillies Third Base Coach; 2009–2010	Succeeded by Juan Samuel
Preceded by Davey Lopes	Philadelphia Phillies First Base coach 2011–2012	Succeeded by Juan Samuel
