= Gary Allenson =

American baseball player (born 1955)

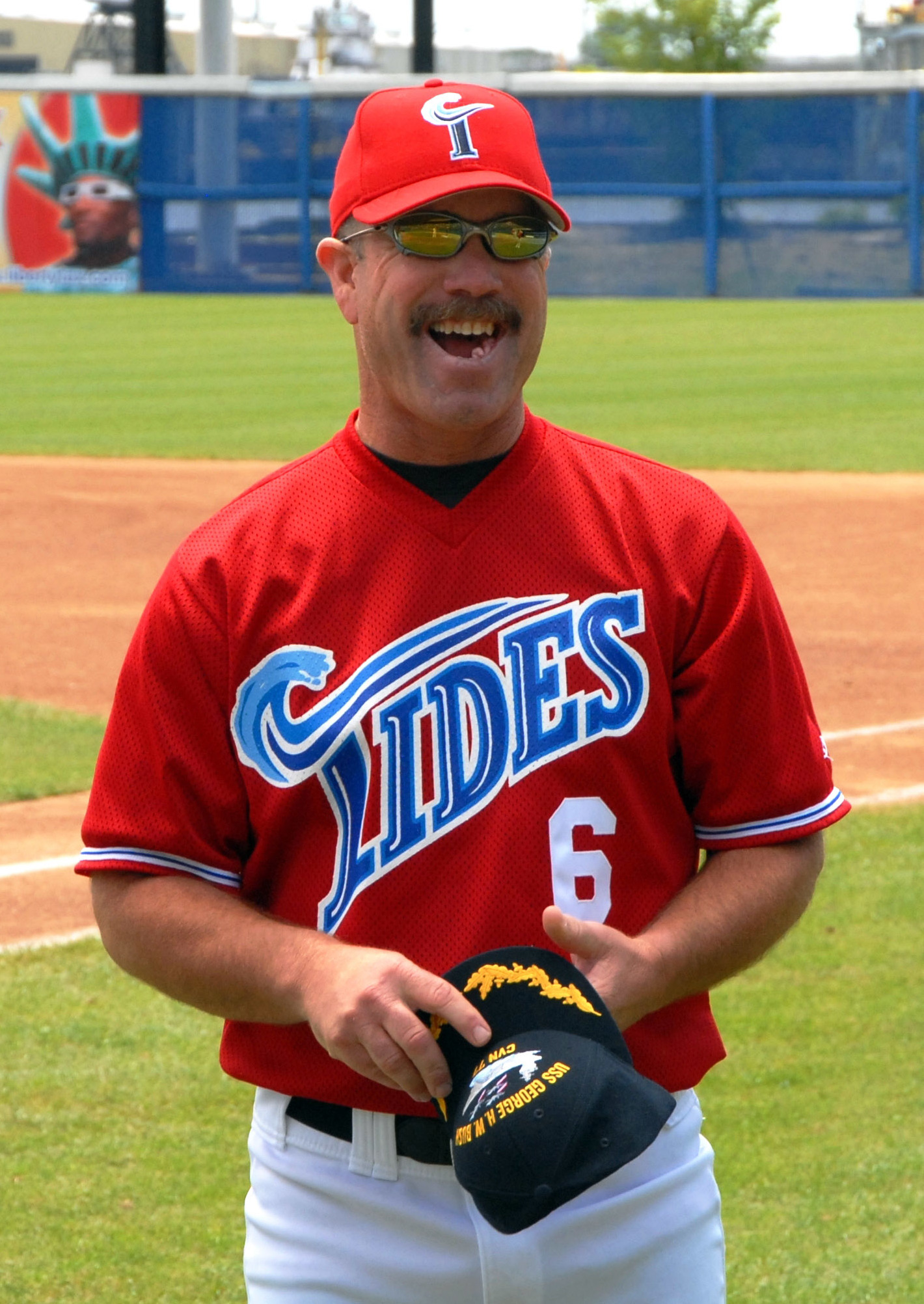
- Allenson with the Norfolk Tides in 2007
- Catcher
- Born: February 4, 1955 (age 71); Culver City, California, U.S.
- Batted: Right Threw: Right

MLB debut
- April 8, 1979, for the Boston Red Sox

Last MLB appearance
- August 23, 1985, for the Toronto Blue Jays

MLB statistics
- Batting average: .221
- Home runs: 19
- Runs batted in: 131
- Stats at Baseball Reference

Teams
- Boston Red Sox (1979–1984); Toronto Blue Jays (1985)
Medals
Men's baseball
Representing United States
Pan American Games
Silver medal – second place	1975 Mexico City	Team

Gary Martin Allenson (born February 4, 1955) is an American former Major League Baseball catcher and coach and minor league manager. In 2017, he spent a second stint as manager of the New Hampshire Fisher Cats of the Double-A Eastern League, after serving the previous three seasons in that role with the Triple-A Buffalo Bisons of the International League. Both are affiliates of the Toronto Blue Jays.

In October 2017, Allenson and the Blue Jays severed their relationship. A former backup catcher for the Blue Jays, he had been a member of the Toronto player development organization since January 7, 2013.

== Playing career ==
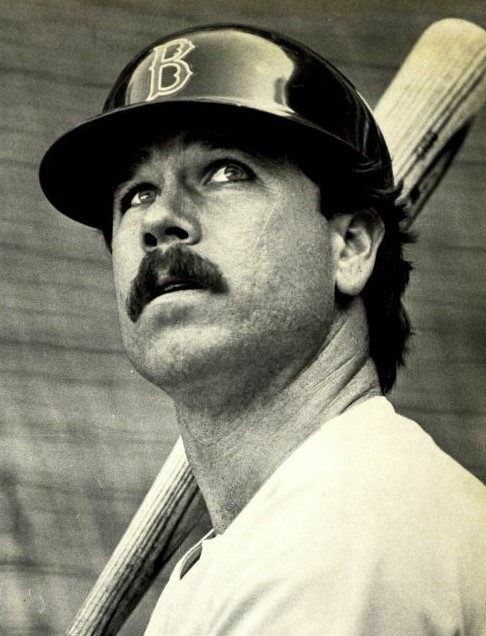
Allenson with the Boston Red Sox

Nicknamed "Muggsy," Allenson was born in Culver City, California, and graduated from nearby Lawndale High School. He played college baseball for the Arizona State Sun Devils, then was selected by the Boston Red Sox in the ninth round of the 1976 amateur draft. In 1978, his third season of professional baseball, he was named the International League's All-Star catcher and Most Valuable Player after slugging 20 home runs and hitting .299 in 133 games played.

During his rookie 1979 season in the Majors, Allenson was the Red Sox' most-used starting catcher, filling in for injured veteran and future Baseball Hall of Famer Carlton Fisk. After Fisk's departure via free agency after the 1980 season, Allenson was Boston's regular catcher in both 1982 and 1983. For the remainder of his playing tenure (1979–85) in the Major Leagues, however, he was a backup for the Red Sox (1980–81; 1984) and Blue Jays (1985). The 5 ft 11 in (1.80 m), 185 lb (84 kg) Allenson batted and threw right-handed. In a seven-season MLB career, he posted a .221 batting average with 235 hits, 19 home runs and 131 RBI in 416 games played.

== Coaching/managing career ==
Allenson began his minor league managerial career in 1987 with the Oneonta Yankees of the New York Yankees farm system. Compiling an 89–62 record in two years, he led the team to the New York – Penn League championship in 1988.

He returned to the Red Sox organization in 1989, first managing at Lynchburg for two seasons (128–146) and then New Britain for one (47–93). He was promoted to Boston, serving as bullpen coach in 1992 and 1993 and third-base coach in 1994.

He returned to the minors in 1996, managing the Charleston RiverDogs, then a Texas Rangers affiliate, to a 63–78 record, moving on to the Houston Astros farm system the following year to manage the Jackson Generals to a 66–73 mark.

He then spent the next five campaigns in the Milwaukee Brewers organization, the first two leading Louisville, known as the Redbirds in 1998 and the RiverBats in 1999, to a combined 140–148 mark. He was brought up to Milwaukee, where he was the first-base coach in 2000 and the third-base coach in 2001 and 2002.

A 77–57 campaign in 2005 at the helm of the Carolina Mudcats, then a Florida Marlins affiliate, was sandwiched between two stints in the Baltimore Orioles organization. He managed the Ottawa Lynx to a 79–65 finish in 2003. After a 31–37 year as skipper of the Bluefield Orioles in 2006, he returned to the International League to manage the Norfolk Tides to a combined 228–254 in a little over 3 1/2 seasons. Allenson was promoted to Baltimore as its third-base coach on June 4, 2010, when Juan Samuel was promoted to interim manager upon the firing of Dave Trembley. Allenson returned to manage the Tides in 2011 then was the 2012 manager of the Aberdeen IronBirds, the Orioles' Short Season-Class A affiliate. His 2012 season was portrayed in a 2021 memoir called Clubbie from the Aberdeen IronBirds' clubhouse attendant, Greg Larson.

Allenson rejoined the Toronto organization in 2013 as manager of the New Hampshire Fisher Cats, leading that edition to a 68–72 mark, then was promoted to Buffalo, where his Bisons teams went 77–66 (2014), 68–76 (2015) and 66–78 (2016). He was reappointed manager of the Fisher Cats on January 17, 2017.

Through 2016, Allenson had compiled a career 1,311–1,440 (.477) record over 22 seasons as a minor league manager.

Sporting positions
Preceded by Butch Hobson	New Britain Red Sox manager 1991	Succeeded by Jim Pankovits
Preceded by John McLaren	Boston Red Sox bullpen coach 1992–1993	Succeeded by John Wathan
Preceded by Rick Burleson	Boston Red Sox third base coach 1994	Succeeded by Dave Oliver
Preceded by Gaylen Pitts (Louisville Redbirds)	Louisville RiverBats manager 1998–1999	Succeeded by Dave Miley
Preceded by Ron Jackson	Milwaukee Brewers first base coach 2000	Succeeded by Luis Salazar
Preceded by Chris Speier	Milwaukee Brewers third base coach 2001–2002	Succeeded by Rich Donnelly
Preceded by Tim Leiper	Ottawa Lynx manager 2003	Succeeded by Tim Leiper
Preceded by Ron Hassey	Carolina Mudcats manager 2005	Succeeded by Luis Dorante
Preceded by Ken Oberkfell; Bobby Dickerson	Norfolk Tides manager 2007–2010; 2011	Succeeded by Bobby Dickerson; Ron Johnson
Preceded by Juan Samuel	Baltimore Orioles third base coach 2010; June 4–October 3	Succeeded by John Russell
Preceded by Sal Fasano; Bobby Meacham	New Hampshire Fisher Cats manager 2013; 2017	Succeeded by Bobby Meacham; John Schneider
Preceded by Marty Brown	Buffalo Bisons manager 2014–2016	Succeeded by Bobby Meacham
