= Mike Cubbage =

American baseball player (1950–2024)

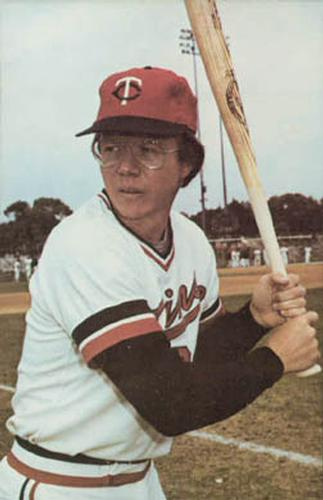
- Cubbage in 1979
- Third baseman
- Born: July 21, 1950; Charlottesville, Virginia, U.S.
- Died: August 11, 2024 (aged 74); Sunset, South Carolina, U.S.
- Batted: Left Threw: Right

MLB debut
- April 7, 1974, for the Texas Rangers

Last MLB appearance
- October 3, 1981, for the New York Mets

MLB statistics
- Batting average: .258
- Home Runs: 34
- Runs batted in: 251
- Stats at Baseball Reference

Teams
- As player: Texas Rangers (1974–1976); Minnesota Twins (1976–1980); New York Mets (1981); As manager: New York Mets (1991); As coach: New York Mets (1990–1996); Houston Astros (1997–2001); Boston Red Sox (2002–2003)

Michael Lee Cubbage (July 21, 1950 – August 11, 2024) was an American third baseman, coach, and manager in Major League Baseball (MLB). Listed at 6 feet 0 inches (1.83 m), 180 pounds (82 kg), he batted left-handed and threw right-handed.

== Early life ==
Born in Charlottesville, Virginia, Cubbage was the son of Lindy and Marge Cubbage and came from a baseball family, as his cousin, Larry Haney, and first cousin once removed, Chris Haney, played in the major leagues. Cubbage attended University of Virginia, where he played for the Virginia Cavaliers baseball and football teams.

== Playing career ==
Cubbage originally was selected by the expansion Washington Senators in the fifth round of the 1968 MLB draft, but did not sign. He then was drafted again by Washington in the second round of the 1971 entry draft, and spent parts of four seasons in the minor leagues before joining the Texas Rangers on April 7, 1974, in a game against the Oakland Athletics. While appearing in nine games with the Rangers in 1974, he did not collect his first major league hit until being called up in 1975, in a game on June 20 against the California Angels, when he went 3-for-5 with four RBIs.

Cubbage was traded along with Roy Smalley III, Bill Singer and Jim Gideon from the Rangers to the Minnesota Twins for Bert Blyleven and Danny Thompson on June 1, 1976. On July 27, 1978, he hit for the cycle against the Toronto Blue Jays. In the bottom of the 2nd inning, Cubbage hit a 1–0 pitch to right field, and was thrown out at third trying to leg out a triple; he was therefore credited for a double on the play. He subsequently hit a home run (4th inning), single (5th inning), and triple (7th inning) to complete the cycle.

Cubbage later signed as a free agent with the New York Mets for the 1981 season. Throughout his playing career, he was considered somewhat of a utility player, playing mostly third base, but with stints at the first and second bases and designated hitter positions. Although he spent most of his playing time at shortstop in high school, Cubbage did not receive any playing time at this position in the major leagues.

In his MLB career of eight seasons, Cubbage appeared in 703 games, batting .258 with 34 home runs and 251 RBIs.

== Coaching and managerial career ==
Cubbage managed in the minor leagues for seven seasons. Beginning in 1983, Cubbage led the Little Falls Mets, moving up to the Lynchburg Mets for the next two seasons. He then managed the Mets' AA Texas League affiliate Jackson Mets for the 1986 season, taking them to their league playoff finals. Cubbage was then promoted back to his home state to manage the AAA level Tidewater Tides for their 1987–1989 International League seasons.

Cubbage then served as Mets' third base coach in the early 1990s, and was named interim manager in September 1991. He managed the Mets in seven games, finishing with a career managerial record of three wins and four losses (.429).

During spring training in 2002, Cubbage served as the interim manager of the Boston Red Sox after previous manager Joe Kerrigan was fired. Cubbage remained on the staff as third base coach after the Red Sox hired Grady Little as Kerrigan's full-time replacement.

== Death ==
Cubbage died on August 11, 2024, at the age of 74.

== See also ==
- List of Major League Baseball players to hit for the cycle

Succession boxes
Achievements
Preceded by Chris Speier	Hitting for the cycle July 27, 1978	Succeeded by George Brett
Sporting positions
Preceded by Sam Perlozzo	Little Falls Mets Manager; 1983	Succeeded by Bud Harrelson
Preceded by Sam Perlozzo	Lynchburg Mets Manager; 1984–1985	Succeeded by Bobby Floyd
Preceded by Sam Perlozzo	Jackson Mets Manager; 1986	Succeeded by Tucker Ashford
Preceded by Sam Perlozzo	Tidwater Tide Manager; 1987–1989	Succeeded by Steve Swisher
Preceded by Bill Robinson	New York Mets First Base Coach; 1990	Succeeded by Tom Spencer
Preceded by Chuck Hiller	New York Mets Third Base Coach; 1991	Succeeded by
Preceded by Bill Robinson	New York Mets Hitting Coach; 1991	Succeeded by Tom McCraw
Preceded by	New York Mets Third Base Coach; 1992–1996	Succeeded by Cookie Rojas
Preceded by	Houston Astros Third Base Coach; 1997–2000	Succeeded by
Preceded by Matt Galante	Houston Astros Third Base Coach; 2001	Succeeded by Tony Peña
Preceded by Gene Lamont	Boston Red Sox Third Base Coach; 2002–2003	Succeeded by Dale Sveum
