= Tom Trebelhorn =

American baseball manager

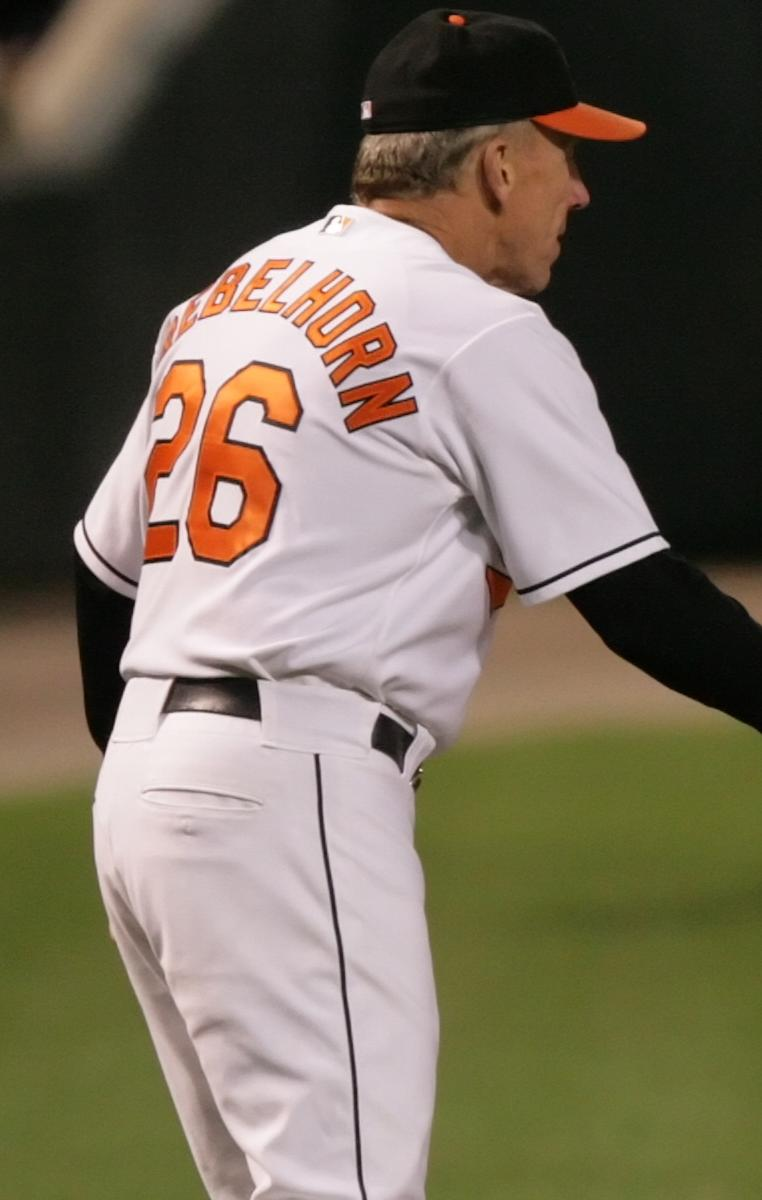
- Trebelhorn in 2006
- Manager / Coach
- Born: January 27, 1948 (age 78); Portland, Oregon, U.S.

MLB statistics
- Managerial record: 471–461
- Winning %: .505
- Stats at Baseball Reference
- Managerial record at Baseball Reference

Teams
- As manager: Milwaukee Brewers (1986–1991); Chicago Cubs (1994); As coach: Milwaukee Brewers (1984); Chicago Cubs (1992–1993); Baltimore Orioles (2001–2007)

Thomas Lynn Trebelhorn (born January 27, 1948) is an American former manager and coach in Major League Baseball (MLB).

== Personal life ==
Trebelhorn was born in Portland, Oregon. Trebelhorn was married since 2000 to former Summerfest director and Milwaukee mainstay Bo Black, until her death on July 24, 2020.

== Playing career ==
Trebelhorn was drafted in the sixth round of the 1970 Major League Baseball draft by the Bend Rainbows, a newly formed short-season Class A team independently owned by the Hawaii Islanders, a AAA club that was itself affiliated with the California Angels. He spent five years as a minor league catcher and infielder for the Islanders (and by extension their affiliates the Angels and, later, San Diego Padres) and Oakland Athletics organizations.

== Managerial career ==
=== Overview ===
After his playing career ended, he served in several managerial and coaching stints in the minor league organizations of the Oakland Athletics, Cleveland Indians, and Pittsburgh Pirates before being named as the first base coach of the Milwaukee Brewers in 1984. In 1975 and 1976, he managed the Boise A's in the Oakland Athletics' Minor League Organization, and it was during this stint (1976) that he was instrumental in teaching future Hall of Famer Rickey Henderson the intricacies of base stealing, based on remarks made by Henderson at his induction ceremony to the 'Hall' on July 27, 2009.

He was named manager of the Brewers' top farm team, the Vancouver Canadians of the Pacific Coast League, in 1985, whom he guided to the league title. The following year saw him back in the majors as the club's third base coach. He was awarded the Brewers' managerial position after the retirement of George Bamberger with nine games remaining in the 1986 season. In the previous four seasons before Trebelhorn, the Brewers had finished fifth or worse each time, doing so by margins of at least eleven games.

Milwaukee started off 1987 with a bang, winning thirteen games in a row; by the time April ended, they were 18–3. May would prove a disaster, signified by a twelve game losing streak (May 3 to May 19), which resulted in them being 24–21 at the end of May, the only month in which the Brewers had a losing record. While the Brewers played consistent ball the rest of the season, they never threatened to close on top of the American League East, and they finished seven games behind for a third place finish. However, it proved a great improvement over recent seasons which garnered him Manager of the Year awards from Baseball America and Sports Illustrated; he finished second in the voting for AL Manager of the Year. Trebelhorn led the 1988 Brewers to an 87–75 record; middling months in April, June, and July meant that the Brewers could not move past the hump in the division, despite the fact they finished in a tie for third place and missed the division crown by two games. The next season was another fourth-place finish for an 81–81 record, falling eight games short of the division. The 1990 season saw them plummet to sixth with a 74–88 record. In his final year with the team, the Brewers went 83–79 and finished fourth in the division by eight games. At the time he was fired, he had the most wins among Brewers managers with 422 before Phil Garner (his successor as manager) passed him, and Trebelhorn ranks fourth as of 2022.

Trebelhorn was named bench coach of the Chicago Cubs in 1992. He was a finalist for the San Francisco Giants managerial job in the winter of that year, being one of the final five candidates interviewed, but Dusty Baker was chosen for the position. He was promoted to manager of the Cubs to replace Jim Lefebvre on October 13, 1993 over bullpen coach Tony Muser by general manager Larry Himes; this was the eleventh Cubs manager hired in the past eleven years. Trebelhorn would have a brief tenure as manager with one noteworthy moment. Following a slow start in which the Cubs failed to win their first eight home games, Trebelhorn promised reporters that if the Cubs lost the next game, he'd answer questions from fans (the Cubs had never lost their first nine home games in a season up to that point). On April 29, 1994, when the Cubs did in fact lose their next game at home, he held court outside a fire station on Waveland Avenue and spoke to a mob of roughly 200 Cubs fans, starting by shouting "OK. Now what do you want to know?" The Cubs lost their next three home games before finally winning at home on May 4, breaking a mark of 0–12 at home to start the season, worst in Cubs history. The strike that occurred in August of that year stopped the team from doing worse than their record of 49–64 (.434), and he was fired on October 17 by new general manager Ed Lynch. He was replaced by Jim Riggleman.

Later that year, he returned to the minor leagues as the first manager of the Tri-City Posse of the newly formed Western Baseball League, directing the club to the league finals. Following this, he was hired to be the minor league coordinator of instruction for the Baltimore Orioles, his first front office position. He served in this role for three years, and afterwards as the Orioles' director of player development and director of organizational instruction for one year each.

In 2001, Trebelhorn was promoted to be the Orioles' third base coach. Midway through the 2005 season, he was transferred to the position of bench coach, taking over the role from Sam Perlozzo, who was named interim manager. In 2006, Trebelhorn returned to his former position of third base coach. For the 2007 season, he once again took over as the Orioles' bench coach. He was fired at the end of the 2007 season.

=== Return to minors ===
He took on the role of manager again in 2008 for the Class A Salem-Keizer Volcanoes, a position in which he served through the 2012 season.

In 2009, Trebelhorn was selected by the Italian national team to be a coach for the 2009 World Baseball Classic.

=== Managerial record ===
Team	From	To	Regular season record			Post–season record		
Team	From	To	W	L	Win %	W	L	Win %
Milwaukee Brewers	1986	1991	422	397	.515	—		
Chicago Cubs	1994	1994	49	64	.434	—		
Total			471	461	.505	0	0	–

Preceded by Doug Rader	Hawaii Islanders Manager; 1983	Succeeded by Tommy Sandt
Preceded by Ron Hansen	Milwaukee Brewers First Base Coach; 1984	Succeeded by Andy Etchebarren
Preceded by Tony Muser	Vancouver Canadians Manager; 1985	Succeeded by Terry Bevington
Preceded by George Bamberger	Milwaukee Brewers Manager; 1986–1991	Succeeded by Phil Garner
Preceded by Joe Altobelli	Chicago Cubs Bench Coach; 1992–1993	Succeeded by Jim Riggleman
Preceded by Jim Lefebvre	Chicago Cubs Manager; 1994	Succeeded by Jim Riggleman
Preceded by Tommy Shields	Delmarva Shorebirds Manager; 1997	Succeeded by Dave Machemer
Preceded by Sam Perlozzo	Baltimore Orioles Third Base Coach; 2001–2005	Succeeded by Rick Dempsey
Preceded by Sam Perlozzo	Baltimore Orioles Bench Coach; 2005	Succeeded by Lee Elia
Preceded by Sam Perlozzo	Baltimore Orioles Third Base Coach; 2006	Succeeded by Juan Samuel
Preceded by Lee Elia	Baltimore Orioles Bench Coach; 2007	Succeeded by Dave Jauss
