= Fenwick Watkins =

American athlete and coach (1887–1943)

Biographical details
- Born: December 27, 1887; Burlington, Vermont, U.S.
- Died: August 8, 1943 (aged 55); Fargo, North Dakota, U.S.

Playing career

Football
- c. 1907: Vermont

Basketball
- 1905–1908: Vermont

Baseball
- c. 1907: Vermont
- Positions: Forward, guard (basketball)

Coaching career (HC unless noted)

Football
- 1909–1914: Fargo
- 1916: Fargo
- 1919–1920: Fargo
- 1922–1925: Concordia (MN)

Basketball
- c. 1910: Fargo

Baseball
- c. 1910: Fargo
- 1922: North Dakota Agricultural

Fenwick Henri Watkins (December 27, 1887 – August 8, 1943) was an American athlete and coach. He attended the University of Vermont, where he starred in football, basketball, and baseball. He was a teammate on the baseball team of two future Major League Baseball players, Larry Gardner and Ray Collins. This trio and the rest of the 1908 Vermont team was one of the most talented in school history, winning a New England championship with a record of 15–9.

After graduating from Vermont, Watkins coached football, basketball, and baseball at Fargo College in Fargo, North Dakota, where he also led the athletic program.

Watkins was born on December 27, 1887, in Burlington, Vermont. He died on August 8, 1943, in Fargo.

In 1906, a local newspaper reported that he was the first black sports captain at the University of Vermont, a role he assumed in 1907 on the school's football team. However, after he moved to North Dakota, contemporaneous newspaper reports never mentioned his race as he appeared to be "passing as white". He was also listed as white on censuses while living in North Dakota. Nonetheless, he was the first black head coach in North Dakota.

== Head coaching record ==
=== Football ===
Year	Team	Overall	Conference	Standing	Bowl/playoffs
Concordia Cobbers (Minnesota Intercollegiate Athletic Conference) (1922–1925)
1922	Concordia	1–4	0–1	6th	
1923	Concordia	2–3–1	1–3	T–6th	
1924	Concordia	2–3–1	1–2	T–5th	
1925	Concordia	2–2–1	1–2	T–4th	
Concordia:		7–12–3	3–8		
Total:					
