= William Farrar (American football) =

American football player, coach, and official, rower, dentist (1867–1933

Biographical details
- Born: October 13, 1867; London, Ontario, Canada
- Died: January 6, 1933 (aged 65); Pittsburgh, Pennsylvania, U.S.

Playing career
- 1895–1896: Penn
- 1898: Duquesne Country and Athletic Club
- Position: Tackle

Coaching career (HC unless noted)
- 1897: Vermont

Head coaching record
- Overall: 3–0–2

William Farrar (October 13, 1867 – January 6, 1933) was an American football official, player, and coach, rower, and a dentist. He was the first football coach for the Vermont Catamounts in 1897. Farrar rowed and play football at the University of Pennsylvania. On the football team he was a tackle. In 1898, he played professional football with the Duquesne Country and Athletic Club.

Farrar was born on October 13, 1967, in London, Ontario. He graduated from the University of Pittsburgh School of Dental Medicine in 1897. He then practiced dentistry in Pittsburgh. Farrar died on January 6, 1933, at Western Pennsylvania Hospital in Pittsburgh.

== Head coaching record ==
Year	Team	Overall	Conference	Standing	Bowl/playoffs
Vermont Green and Gold (Independent) (1897)
1897	Vermont	3–0–2			
Vermont:		3–0–2			
Total:		3–0–2			
