= Juan Samuel =

Dominican baseball player and manager (born 1960)

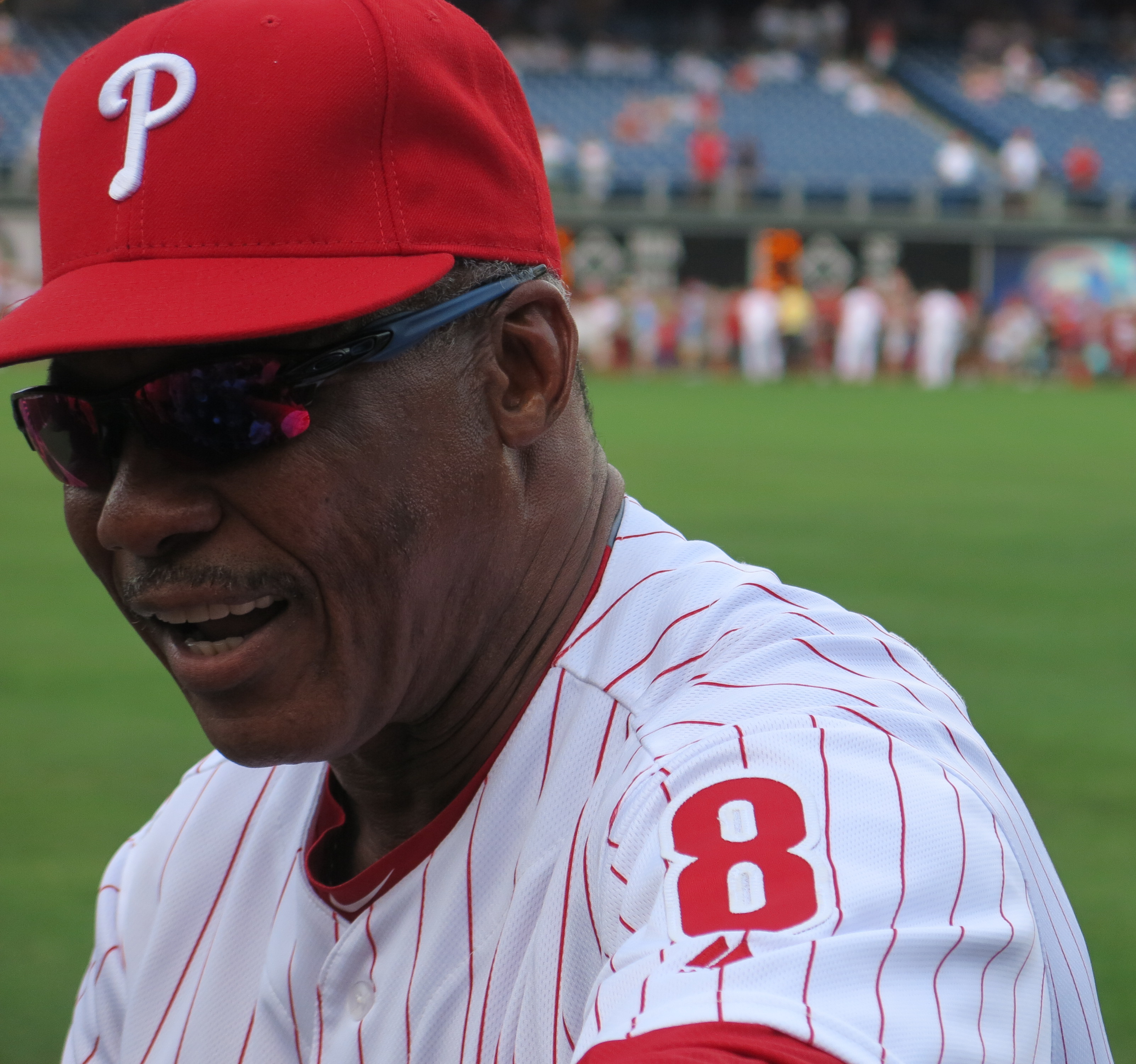
- Samuel with the Phillies in 2016
- Second baseman / Center fielder / Manager
- Born: December 9, 1960 (age 65); San Pedro de Macorís, Dominican Republic
- Batted: Right Threw: Right

MLB debut
- August 24, 1983, for the Philadelphia Phillies

Last MLB appearance
- September 26, 1998, for the Toronto Blue Jays

MLB statistics
- Batting average: .259
- Home runs: 161
- Runs batted in: 703
- Stolen bases: 396
- Managerial record: 17–34
- Winning %: .333
- Stats at Baseball Reference
- Managerial record at Baseball Reference

Teams
- As player: Philadelphia Phillies (1983–1989); New York Mets (1989); Los Angeles Dodgers (1990–1992); Kansas City Royals (1992); Cincinnati Reds (1993); Detroit Tigers (1994–1995); Kansas City Royals (1995); Toronto Blue Jays (1996–1998); As manager: Baltimore Orioles (2010); As coach: Detroit Tigers (1999–2005); Baltimore Orioles (2007–2010); Philadelphia Phillies (2011–2017)

Career highlights and awards
- 3× All-Star (1984, 1987, 1991); Silver Slugger Award (1987); Philadelphia Phillies Wall of Fame
Medals
Men's baseball
Representing Dominican Republic
World Baseball Classic
Gold medal – first place	2013 San Francisco	Team

Juan Milton Samuel (born December 9, 1960) is a Dominican former professional baseball second baseman and outfielder who played 16 seasons in Major League Baseball (MLB). A three-time National League (NL) All-Star, he appeared in the 1983 World Series with the Philadelphia Phillies. Samuel served as interim manager for the Baltimore Orioles during the 2010 MLB season, as well as many years in MLB coaching ranks. Known widely for his unique combination of speed and power, Samuel was inducted into the Hispanic Heritage Baseball Museum Hall of Fame, in 2010.

== Baseball career ==
Samuel was originally signed as a non-drafted free agent by the Philadelphia Phillies in 1980. A three-time All-Star, Samuel earned National League (NL) Rookie of the Year honors from The Sporting News in 1984, when he tied for the NL lead with 19 triples and placed second with 72 stolen bases, which established a then-MLB rookie single-season record for steals, (Note: Broken by Vince Coleman with 110 the following season in 1985) previously held by Tim Raines with 71 in 1981. He finished second in official NL Rookie of the Year voting behind Dwight Gooden. During his majors career, Samuel collected 1,578 hits, 396 stolen bases, and also reached double figures in home runs ten times. A popular player in Philadelphia, he appeared in the 1983 World Series, going 0-for-1 in three games.

Samuel was sent to the New York Mets during the 1989 midseason in the same transaction that brought Lenny Dykstra and Roger McDowell to Philadelphia. He also played two and a half seasons both for the Los Angeles Dodgers and Detroit Tigers, spent a year with the Cincinnati Reds, had two brief stints with the Kansas City Royals, and provided three years of good services for the Toronto Blue Jays, pinch-hitting, serving as DH, and playing at first base, second, third, left field and right. He retired after the 1998 season.

Samuel holds the major league record for most at-bats by a right-handed hitter in one season with 701, set in 1984. That mark was also the most for any National League batter in a single campaign, later surpassed by Jimmy Rollins. He also tied a major league record for consecutive strikeout titles with four (1984–87), shared with Hack Wilson (1927–30) and Vince DiMaggio (1942–45).

In a 16-season playing career, Samuel was a .259 hitter with 161 home runs and 703 RBI in 1,720 games.

== Post-playing career ==
=== Coaching career ===
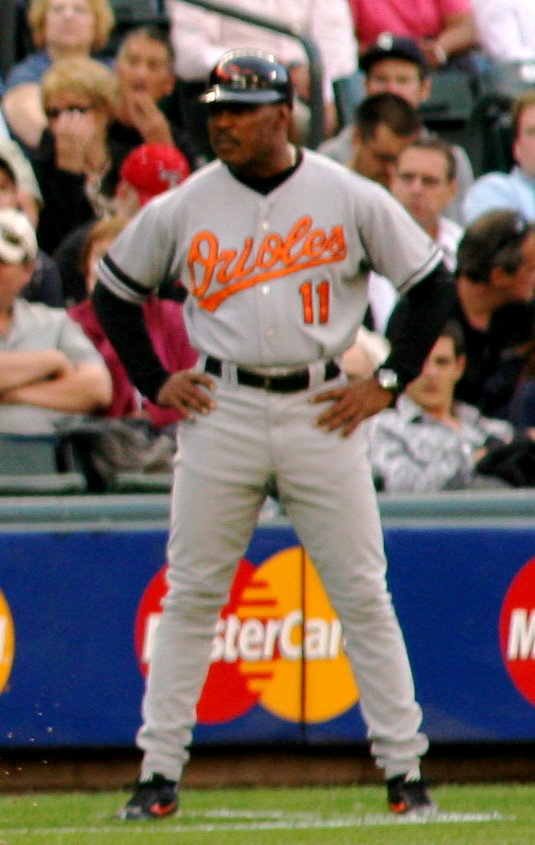
Samuel coaching with the Orioles in 2008

Since retiring from play, Samuel has coached at various levels and in various roles. He coached third base for the Detroit Tigers in 2005 after having coached first base for the team since 1999. He managed the Double-A Binghamton Mets for the 2006 season, and was named the third base coach for the Baltimore Orioles on October 31, 2006, where he remained through the first part of 2010.

In August 2008, Samuel was inducted into the Philadelphia Phillies Wall of Fame at Citizens Bank Park.

Samuel joined the Philadelphia Phillies coaching staff for the 2011 season as third base coach, with former third base coach Sam Perlozzo moving to first base coach. In 2013, he moved to first base coach with Ryne Sandberg taking over the duties at third base. Upon Sandberg being named interim manager, Samuel returned to filling the role of third base coach for the Phillies.

On January 6, 2022, Samuel was hired to serve as a minor league hitting instructor for the Cincinnati Reds organization.

On July 2, 2026, Samuel was announced as the bench coach for the American League at the All-Star Futures Game.

== Managerial career ==
=== Baltimore Orioles ===
Samuel was named interim manager of the Orioles after Dave Trembley's dismissal on June 4, 2010. He took over a ballclub that was in last place in the American League (AL) East with the majors' worst record at 15–39. During his brief tenure, the team had a pair of four-game win streaks. The first one on June 24–27 was highlighted by a three-game sweep of the Washington Nationals at Camden Yards. Its first four-game road sweep since 1995 occurred after the vanquishing of the eventual AL champion Texas Rangers at Rangers Ballpark in Arlington two weekends later and immediately prior to the All-Star break. Beyond this, the Orioles showed little tangible improvement as they went 17–34 under Samuel, whose stint ended on August 1 with a 5–4 loss at Kauffman Stadium, the third straight defeat to the Kansas City Royals. Three days earlier on July 29, Buck Showalter was announced as Samuel's successor on a full-time basis beginning on August 3. After declining an offer to return to his old third-base coaching job, Samuel accepted a position elsewhere in the organization as an evaluator for its Dominican Republic academy for the remainder of that season.

=== Managerial record ===
As of games played on April 10, 2019.

Team	Year	Regular season					Postseason			
Team	Year	Games	Won	Lost	Win %	Finish	Won	Lost	Win %	Result
BAL	2010	51	17	34	.333	(interim)	–	–	–	–
Total		51	17	34	.333		0	0	.000	

== See also ==
- List of Major League Baseball career stolen bases leaders
- List of Major League Baseball career triples leaders

== Notes ==
Sporting positions
Preceded by Tom Trebelhorn	Baltimore Orioles third base coach 2007–2010	Succeeded by Gary Allenson
Preceded by Sam Perlozzo	Philadelphia Phillies third base coach 2011–2012	Succeeded by Ryne Sandberg
Preceded by Sam Perlozzo	Philadelphia Phillies first base coach 2013–2015	Succeeded by Mickey Morandini
Preceded by John Mizerock	Philadelphia Phillies third base coach 2016–2017	Succeeded by Dusty Wathan
