= P. J. McMahon (American football) =

American football player, coach, and dentist (1877–1913)

Biographical details
- Born: 1877; Windsor, Vermont, U.S.
- Died: April 15, 1913 (aged 35–36); Chester, Vermont, U.S.
- Education: Penn Dental (DDS, 1900)

Playing career
- 1898–1899: Penn
- Position: End

Coaching career (HC unless noted)
- 1901: Vermont

Head coaching record
- Overall: 5–5–1

Philip John McMahon (1877 – April 15, 1913) was an American college football player, coach, and dentist. He was a 1900 graduate of the University of Pennsylvania School of Dental Medicine. While there, he lettered in football during the 1898 football season. McMahon served as the head football coach at the University of Vermont for one season in 1901, compiling a record of 5–5–1.

== Head coaching record ==
Year	Team	Overall	Conference	Standing	Bowl/playoffs
Vermont Green and Gold (Independent) (1901)
1901	Vermont	5–5–1			
Vermont:		5–5–1			
Total:		5–5–1			
