= Ralph LaPointe =

American baseball player (1922–1967)

- Shortstop / Second baseman
- Born: January 8, 1922; Winooski, Vermont, U.S.
- Died: September 13, 1967 (aged 45); Burlington, Vermont, U.S.
- Batted: Right Threw: Right

MLB debut
- April 15, 1947, for the Philadelphia Phillies

Last MLB appearance
- September 29, 1948, for the St. Louis Cardinals

MLB statistics
- Batting average: .266
- Home runs: 1
- Runs batted in: 30
- Stats at Baseball Reference

Teams
- Philadelphia Phillies (1947); St. Louis Cardinals (1948)

Raoul Robert "Ralph" LaPointe (January 8, 1922 – September 13, 1967) was an American professional baseball player. In a playing career that spanned eight teams, ten years, and seven seasons, LaPointe played for the Philadelphia Phillies of Major League Baseball in 1947, and the St. Louis Cardinals in 1948. He was officially listed as standing 5 feet 11 inches (180 cm) and weighing 185 pounds (84 kg).

== Early life ==
LaPointe was born on January 8, 1922, in Winooski, Vermont. He attended Winooski High School and then matriculated at the University of Vermont in 1941 after a summer playing independent baseball. He was a three-sport star for the freshman teams in baseball, basketball, and football, earning All-American honors in the fall of 1942 for the last. He joined the military during World War II and served stateside until 1945, undertaking specialized linguistic training at Haverford College and serving three years at Camp Ritchie in Maryland.

== Baseball career ==
=== Minor leagues ===
The Philadelphia Phillies signed LaPointe as an amateur free agent in February 1946 and assigned him to the Wilmington Blue Rocks, their class-B affiliate in the Interstate League. He led the 1946 team in at-bats (572), and was second in batting average (.320, behind Ed Murphy) and doubles (34, behind Mickey Rutner). On May 28 of that year, LaPointe was involved in an incident in a game between the Blue Rocks and the Cleveland Indians-affiliated Harrisburg Senators, in which he ran into second baseman Dale Lynch after several players had been ejected for arguing with umpire Max Shindler. LaPointe also played a key role in the season's playoffs, where the Blue Rocks faced the Senators again; he hit a two-run home run with the Blue Rocks behind in the bottom of the ninth inning to score Joe Scheldt and give the Rocks the walk-off victory on their way to the 1946 league championship.

=== 1947: Philadelphia Phillies and minor league Orioles ===
LaPointe made the Phillies' Opening Day roster in the 1947 season, entering Philadelphia's first game of the year as a defensive replacement for starting second baseman Emil Verban. He notched his first major-league hit in his second appearance, a 5–2 loss to the Brooklyn Dodgers on April 23. His first major-league start, run scored, and run batted in (RBI) all came in the same contest, an 11–4 loss to the Pittsburgh Pirates on April 30 wherein LaPointe led off for Philadelphia and reached base once, by means of a walk. He played five games for the Phillies in May, including both halves of doubleheaders on May 4 and 8, but the Phillies demoted him to the minor league Baltimore Orioles on May 14. He batted .277 for the Orioles during his minor league stint, hitting five home runs, including one in his first at-bat in Baltimore. On June 2, he tied an International League record with six errors against the Rochester Red Wings —before hitting a walk-off home run in the ninth inning—and followed with four more errors against the Red Wings on June 25.

LaPointe returned to Philadelphia in August, going 1-for-5 with a run scored in his first game back. Between August 17 and 21, he hit safely 13 times in 30 at-bats, raising his average to .315 and scoring eight runs while batting in two over the stretch. In September, LaPointe played in six games over three days, as the Phillies played three back-to-back doubleheaders against the Chicago Cubs and the Pirates. He went 15-for-27 with three doubles, three RBI, and his first major-league home run in those three days. His strong performance in the latter half of the season maintained his batting average at .308. For his season-long achievements, LaPointe was named to The Sporting News' All-Rookie Team.

=== 1948: Trade to St. Louis ===
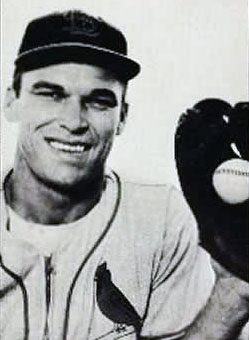
LaPointe was traded to the Cardinals for first baseman Dick Sisler.

Prior to the start of the 1948 season, the Phillies acquired first baseman Dick Sisler from the St. Louis Cardinals in exchange for LaPointe; the trade included cash sent to St. Louis believed to be $20,000–$30,000 ($268,000–$402,000 today). Serving as a utility backup to regulars Marty Marion and Red Schoendienst, LaPointe began his Cardinals career with four hits, two runs scored, two RBI, and one double in his first four contests; however, by May 14, his batting average had dropped to .200. Although a three-hit performance on May 16 raised his average and a double, a single, and two RBI on May 19 helped his cause, his average was still a struggling .214 at the end of May and dropped below the Mendoza Line to .192 by the end of June, in which he only hit safely in one game.

In July, LaPointe appeared in all but two games for the Cardinals while filling in at second base for Schoendienst—who injured his shoulder—including five sets of doubleheaders; he notched seven multi-hit games in the month, capped by a 3-for-5 performance in a 12–10 loss to the Cubs on July 6. He raised his average to .213 by late July and amassed a seven-game hitting streak in mid-August—with four of those being two-hit contests—which raised his average as hit as .231. He had one hit on the first of September, his final safety of the season, and finished the year batting .225 with 27 runs scored and 15 RBI in 87 games played.

=== Return to the minors ===
LaPointe was assigned to the AAA-level Rochester Red Wings by St. Louis for the 1949 season. Although he had played in only one career game as a third baseman at the major-league level, he was moved there as the starter for the Red Wings, playing 78 games at the hot corner. As Rochester's primary leadoff hitter, he batted .273 with 12 doubles, 3 home runs, and 35 RBI. He returned to the Phillies' farm system in 1950, traded to the Toronto Maple Leafs prior to the season's start. Manager Jack Sanford moved LaPointe back to shortstop; he batted .237 in 110 games for Toronto. In 393 at-bats that season, he scored 46 runs while batting in 27, and his 17 doubles were the fourth-highest total on the team. After batting .270 in 68 games for the Tulsa Oilers of the Texas League in 1951, LaPointe retired from professional baseball.

== Coaching career ==
After LaPointe's retirement, University of Vermont athletic director Larry Gardner stepped down as the Catamounts' baseball coach and appointed LaPointe to replace him. He coached the Vermont baseball team for 16 seasons from 1952 to 1967. During his tenure, Catamounts baseball teams collected a 216–127 win–loss record and won 13 state championships. During the 1955 season, he returned to a short stint in professional baseball as the playing coach of the Provincial League's Burlington A's, playing third base as the team finished second to the Québec Braves. He led the Catamounts within one game of the College World Series during the 1956 season, and was honored by both the Vermont Sportscasters and Sportswriters Association—for "outstanding contribution to Vermont sports"—and by the National Collegiate Athletic Association, who named him the Coach of the Year in 1967, his final season.

== Death and legacy ==
Less than two months after the conclusion of his final season, LaPointe died on September 13, 1967, dying of cancer. Thereafter, the university's baseball field house at Centennial Field was renamed the Ralph LaPointe Field House, which was restored and re-dedicated in 1988. LaPointe was elected to the American Baseball Coaches Association Hall of Fame in 1978 and named to Sports Illustrated's list of the top 50 athletes from Vermont in the 20th century in 1999. LaPointe was inducted into the Vermont Sports Hall of Fame in 2013.
