= Vermont Catamounts football =

- First season: 1886
- Last season: 1974
- Location: Burlington, Vermont
- Stadium: Centennial Field (capacity: 4,415)
- NCAA division: Division I
- Conference: Yankee Conference
- Colors: Green and gold
- Bowl record: 0–0 (–)

National championships
- Claimed: 0

Conference championships
- 0

Division championships
- 0
- Rivalries: New Hampshire

The Vermont Catamounts football program was the intercollegiate American football team for the University of Vermont located in Burlington, Vermont. The team competed in the NCAA Division I and were members of the Yankee Conference. The school's first football team was fielded in 1886. The football program was discontinued at the conclusion of the 1974 season.

Vermont fields a team at the club football level, in a conference that also uses the Yankee Conference name.

== History ==
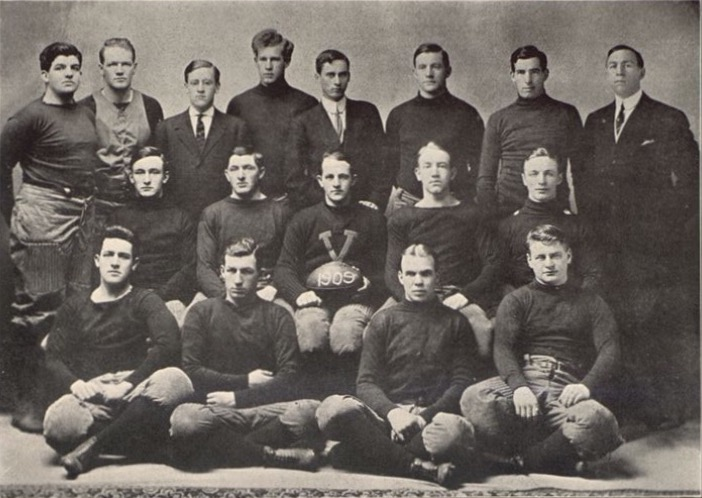
The 1909 football team

The first intercollegiate game in the state of Vermont happened on November 6, 1886, between Dartmouth and Vermont in Burlington. Dartmouth won 91 to 0. Vermont reached a level of success after coach "Dud" Drake in the 1907 and 1908 seasons. The 1907 team fought Dartmouth to a scoreless tie, and the 1908 team gave Cornell a scare.

In 2007, The University of Vermont brought football back as a club sport under the Student Government Association by Doug Deluca. The University of Vermont Club football team is currently playing in the NCFA and is led by head coach Jeff Porter, defensive coordinator Jason Paul and offensive coordinator Jack Leclerc.

As of recent, the team has sustained some success under head coach Jeff Porter. During the 2019 NCFA season, the Catamounts went undefeated in the North Atlantic conference until losing in their conference championship game to Sacred Heart University. The Catamounts are currently ranked fifth in the NCFA.

=== All-time Yankee Conference records ===
This table reflects the results of Yankee Conference matchups when both Vermont and its opponent were members of the conference. Vermont began Yankee Conference play in 1947 with Connecticut, Maine, Massachusetts, New Hampshire, and Rhode Island. Although they played UMass and UNH in the first season, they didn't play Maine until 1950, Rhode Island until 1955, and UConn until 1966. Boston University began league play in 1973.

Team	Yankee Wins	Yankee Losses	Yankee Ties	Winning Percentage	Notable Streak	First Yankee Meeting	Last Meeting
Boston University Terriers	1	1	0	.500		1973	1974
Connecticut Huskies	2	7	0	.222	Lost 4	1966	1974
Maine Black Bears	4	21	0	.160	Lost 14	1950	1974
UMass Minutemen	3	18	1	.159	Lost 15	1947	1974
New Hampshire Wildcats	9	9	0	.500	Won 4	1947	1974
Rhode Island Rams	8	8	1	.500	Won 5	1955	1974
	27	66	2	.295			

All Data from Michigan-Football.com

== Head coaches ==
- William Farrar (1897)
- D. M. McLaughlin (1898–1899)
- M. Delmar Ritchie (1900)
- P. J. McMahon (1901)
- Harry Howard Cloudman (1902–1904)
- George B. Drake (1905–1907)
- Edward Albert Herr (1908)
- Ray B. Thomas (1909)
- Edward Joseph Slavin (1910–1911)
- Earle T. Pickering (1912)
- Jere O'Brien (1913)
- James A. Turner (1914)
- Stanley L. Robinson (1915)
- Edwin W. Leary (1916)
- Unknown (1917)
- No coach (1918)
- William P. Edmunds (1919)
- J. Frank Burke (1920)
- Tom Keady (1921–1924)
- William McAvoy (1925–1928)
- William V. Rattan (1928–1929)
- David L. Dunn (1930–1931)
- John H. Burke (1932–1933)
- John P. Sabo (1934–1939)
- John C. Evans (1940–1942)
- No team (1943–1945)
- John C. Evans (1946–1951)
- J. Edward Donnelly (1952–1961)
- Bob Clifford (1962–1969)
- Joe Scannella (1970–1971)
- Carl Falivene (1972–1974)

== Notable former players ==
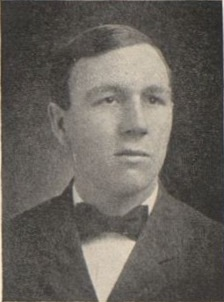
Ray B. Thomas

Notable alumni include:

- George Cassidy, head football coach at Colorado Agricultural (1911)
- Leo Douglass, National Football League player (1926)
- W. J. Forbes, head football coach at Colorado Agricultural (1899)
- Denny Lambert, athletic director at Vermont (1973–1992)
- Ralph LaPointe, Major League Baseball player (1947–1948)
- Bill Leete, head football coach at Hofstra (1975–1980)
- Arlie Pond, Major League Baseball player (1895–1898)
- Ray B. Thomas, head football coach at Vermont (1909) and New Hampshire (1910–1911)
- Frank Trigilio, All-America Football Conference player (1946)
- Fenwick Watkins, coach at Fargo College in North Dakota (c.1910)
