= 1987 San Francisco Giants season =

1987 San Francisco Giants
- National League West champions
- League: National League
- Division: West
- Ballpark: Candlestick Park
- City: San Francisco
- Owners: Bob Lurie
- General managers: Al Rosen
- Managers: Roger Craig
- Television: KTVU (Ron Fairly, Gary Park); GiantsVision (Joe Morgan, Duane Kuiper)
- Radio: KNBR (Ron Fairly, Wayne Hagin); KIQI (Tito Fuentes, Edgard Martinez)

The 1987 San Francisco Giants season was the Giants' 105th season in Major League Baseball, their 30th season in San Francisco since their move from New York following the 1957 season, and their 28th at Candlestick Park. The Giants finished in first place in the National League West with a record of 90 wins and 72 losses. They lost the NLCS in seven games to the St. Louis Cardinals. It was their first playoff appearance since 1971.

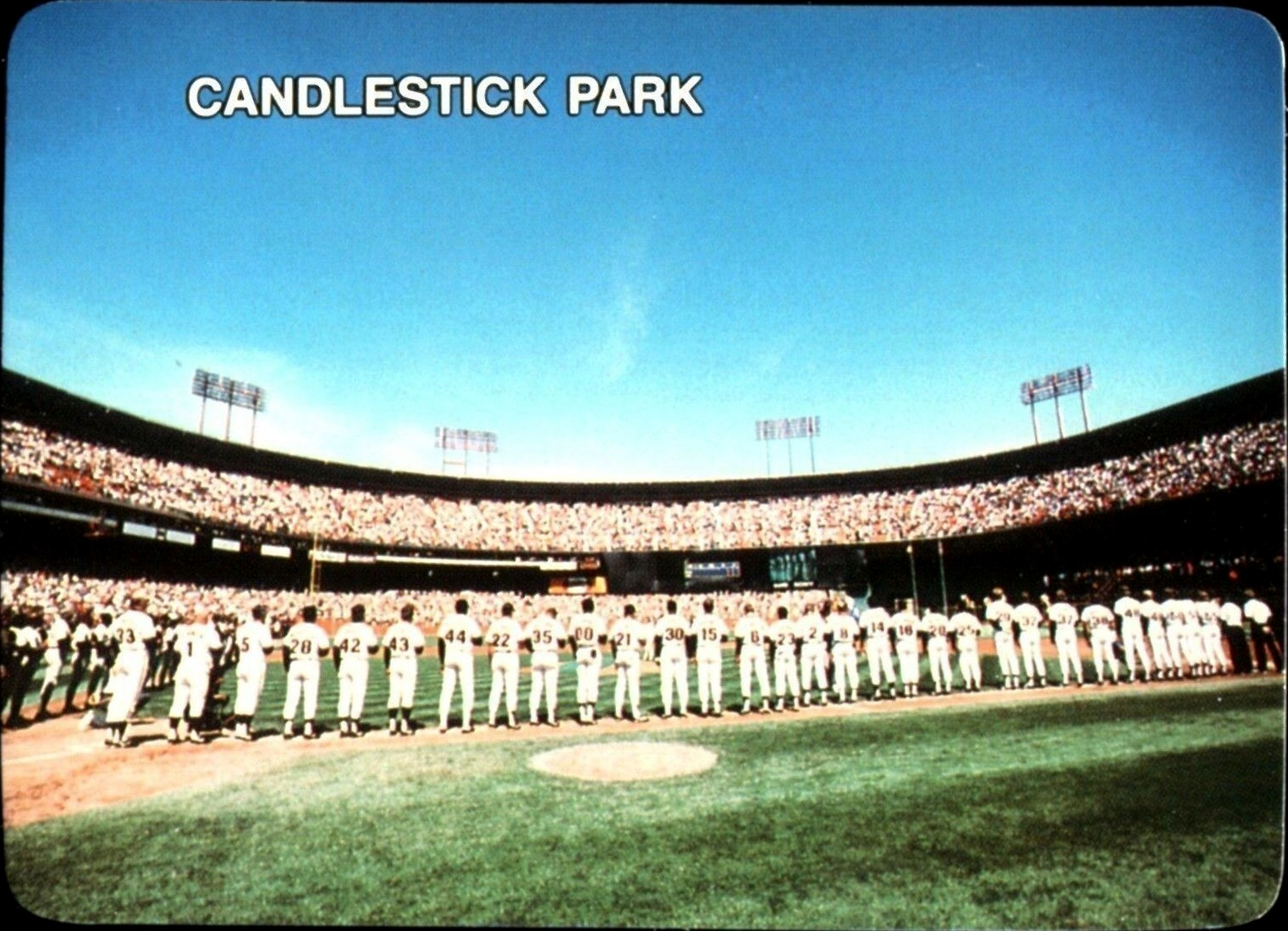
Giants players standing for the national anthem at Candlestick Park in 1987.

== Offseason ==
- October 16, 1986: Brad Gulden was released by the San Francisco Giants.
- October 16, 1986: Chuck Hensley was released by the San Francisco Giants.
- October 21, 1986: Mike Jeffcoat was released by the San Francisco Giants.
- February 4, 1987: Atlee Hammaker was signed as a free agent by the Giants.
- March 31, 1987: Dan Gladden and David Blakely (minors) were traded by the Giants to the Minnesota Twins for Jose Dominguez (minors), Ray Velasquez (minors) and a player to be named later. The Twins completed the deal by sending Bryan Hickerson to the Giants on June 15.

== Regular season ==
Mike LaCoss pitched a 10-inning complete game shutout against the Los Angeles Dodgers on August 16; as of 2021, he remains the last Giants pitcher to throw more than nine innings in a game. On September 9, Nolan Ryan struck out Mike Aldrete for the 4,500th strikeout of his career.

=== Opening Day starters ===
- Bob Brenly
- Chris Brown
- Will Clark
- Chili Davis
- Mike Krukow
- Jeffrey Leonard
- Candy Maldonado
- Robby Thompson
- José Uribe

=== Season standings ===
NL West
Team	W	L	Pct.	GB	Home	Road
San Francisco Giants	90	72	.556	—	46‍–‍35	44‍–‍37
Cincinnati Reds	84	78	.519	6	42‍–‍39	42‍–‍39
Houston Astros	76	86	.469	14	47‍–‍34	29‍–‍52
Los Angeles Dodgers	73	89	.451	17	40‍–‍41	33‍–‍48
Atlanta Braves	69	92	.429	20½	42‍–‍39	27‍–‍53
San Diego Padres	65	97	.401	25	37‍–‍44	28‍–‍53

=== Record vs. opponents ===
1987 National League record Sources:
Team	ATL	CHC	CIN	HOU	LAD	MON	NYM	PHI	PIT	SD	SF	STL
Atlanta	—	6–5	8–10	8–10	6–12	3–9	7–5	7–5	7–5	6–12	8–10	3–9
Chicago	5–6	—	6–6	8–4	6–6	10–8	9–9	8–10	4–14	9–3	5–7	6–12
Cincinnati	10–8	6–6	—	13–5	10–8	6–6	7–5	5–7	4–8	12–6	7–11	4–8
Houston	10–8	4–8	5–13	—	12–6	7–5	6–6	6–6	6–6	5–13	10–8	5–7
Los Angeles	12–6	6–6	8–10	6–12	—	3–9	6–6	2–10	6–6	11–7	10–8	3–9
Montreal	9–3	8–10	6–6	5–7	9–3	—	8–10	10–8	11–7	9–3	5–7	11–7
New York	5–7	9–9	5–7	6–6	6–6	10–8	—	13–5	12–6	8–4	9–3	9–9
Philadelphia	5–7	10–8	7–5	6–6	10–2	8–10	5–13	—	11–7	8–4	2–10	8–10
Pittsburgh	5–7	14–4	8–4	6–6	6–6	7–11	6–12	7–11	—	8–4	6–6	7–11
San Diego	12–6	3–9	6–12	13–5	7–11	3–9	4–8	4–8	4–8	—	5–13	4–8
San Francisco	10–8	7–5	11–7	8–10	8–10	7–5	3–9	10–2	6–6	13–5	—	7–5
St. Louis	9–3	12–6	8–4	7–5	9–3	7–11	9–9	10–8	11–7	8–4	5–7	—

=== Notable transactions ===
- April 25, 1987: Colin Ward and Steve Miller (minors) were traded by the Giants to the San Diego Padres for Mark Wasinger and Tim Meagher (minors).
- May 28, 1987: Greg Minton was released by the Giants.
- June 2, 1987: Mike Benjamin was drafted by the Giants in the 3rd round of the 1987 Major League Baseball draft. Player signed June 14, 1987.
- July 5, 1987: Mark Davis, Chris Brown, Keith Comstock, and Mark Grant were traded by the Giants to the San Diego Padres for Dave Dravecky, Craig Lefferts, and Kevin Mitchell.
- July 31, 1987: Mackey Sasser and $50,000 were traded by the Giants to the Pittsburgh Pirates for Don Robinson.
- August 21, 1987: Jeff Robinson and Scott Medvin were traded by the Giants to the Pittsburgh Pirates for Rick Reuschel.
- September 1, 1987: Dave Henderson was acquired by the Giants from the Boston Red Sox for a player to be named later.

=== Major League debuts ===
- Batters:
  - Kirt Manwaring (Sep 15)
  - Jessie Reid (Sep 9)
  - Mackey Sasser (Jul 17)
  - Matt Williams (Apr 11)
- Pitchers:
  - John Burkett (Sep 15)

== Game log and schedule ==
Legend
	Giants win
	Giants loss
	Postponement
**Bold**	Giants team member

1987 Game Log (90–72) (Home: 46–35; Road: 44–37)
April (16–7) (Home: 6–2; Road: 10–5)

#	Date	Opponent	Score	Win	Loss	Save	Stadium	Attendance	Record	Report
1	April 6	Padres	4–3 (12)				**Candlestick Park**		1–0	W1
2	April 7	Padres	4–3				**Candlestick Park**		2–0	W2
3	April 8	Padres	2–1				**Candlestick Park**		3–0	W3
4	April 9	@ Dodgers	8–1				Dodger Stadium		4–0	W4
5	April 10	@ Dodgers	5–4 (11)				Dodger Stadium		5–0	W5
6	April 11	@ Dodgers	1–5				Dodger Stadium		5–1	L1
7	April 12	@ Dodgers	5–7				Dodger Stadium		5–2	L2
8	April 13	@ Padres	13–6				Jack Murphy Stadium		6–2	W1
9	April 14	@ Padres	3–2				Jack Murphy Stadium		7–2	W2
10	April 15	@ Padres	1–0				Jack Murphy Stadium		8–2	W3
11	April 17	Braves	0–2				**Candlestick Park**		8–3	L1
12	April 18	Braves	2–1 (10)				**Candlestick Park**		9–3	W1
13	April 19	Braves	4–3				**Candlestick Park**		10–3	W2
14	April 20	Dodgers	4–3				**Candlestick Park**		11–3	W3
15	April 21	Dodgers	8–11 (10)				**Candlestick Park**		11–4	L1
16	April 22	Dodgers	3–5				**Candlestick Park**		11–5	L2
17	April 24	@ Braves	7–5				Atlanta–Fulton County Stadium		12–5	W1
18	April 25	@ Braves	3–5				Atlanta–Fulton County Stadium		12–6	L1
19	April 26	@ Braves	6–4				Atlanta–Fulton County Stadium		13–6	W1
20	April 27	@ Braves	7–3				Atlanta–Fulton County Stadium		14–6	W2
21	April 28	@ Cubs	6–2				Wrigley Field		15–6	W3
22	April 29	@ Cubs	4–8				Wrigley Field		15–7	L1
23	April 30	@ Cubs	5–4				Wrigley Field		16–7	W1

May (11–15) (Home: 4–9; Road: 7–6)

#	Date	Opponent	Score	Win	Loss	Save	Stadium	Attendance	Record	Report
24	May 1	@ Pirates	2–4				Three Rivers Stadium		16–8	L1
25	May 2	@ Pirates	0–1				Three Rivers Stadium		16–9	L2
26	May 4	@ Cardinals	10–7				Busch Stadium		17–9	W1
27	May 5	@ Cardinals	10–6				Busch Stadium		18–9	W2
28	May 6	Cubs	4–9				**Candlestick Park**		18–10	L1
29	May 7	Cubs	11–1				**Candlestick Park**		19–10	W1
30	May 8	Pirates	4–2				**Candlestick Park**		20–10	W2
31	May 9	Pirates	9–4				**Candlestick Park**		21–10	W3
32	May 10	Pirates	1–4 (11)				**Candlestick Park**		21–11	L1
33	May 12	Cardinals	5–6				**Candlestick Park**		21–12	L2
34	May 13	Cardinals	6–7				**Candlestick Park**		21–13	L3
35	May 15	@ Mets	3–8				Shea Stadium		21–14	L4
36	May 16	@ Mets	5–4 (10)				Shea Stadium		22–14	W1
37	May 17	@ Mets	4–6				Shea Stadium		22–15	L1
38	May 18	@ Expos	2–7				Olympic Stadium		22–16	L2
39	May 19	@ Expos	6–2				Olympic Stadium		23–16	W1
40	May 20	@ Expos	9–7				Olympic Stadium		24–16	W2
41	May 22	@ Phillies	2–1				Veterans Stadium		25–16	W3
42	May 23	@ Phillies	8–9				Veterans Stadium		25–17	L1
43	May 24	@ Phillies	6–3				Veterans Stadium		26–17	W1
44	May 25	Mets	7–8				**Candlestick Park**		26–18	L1
45	May 26	Mets	2–3				**Candlestick Park**		26–19	L2
46	May 27	Mets	3–4				**Candlestick Park**		26–20	L3
47	May 29	Expos	4–10				**Candlestick Park**		26–21	L4
48	May 30	Expos	4–6				**Candlestick Park**		26–22	L5
49	May 31	Expos	8–0				**Candlestick Park**		27–22	W1

June (11–16) (Home: 6–9; Road: 5–7)

#	Date	Opponent	Score	Win	Loss	Save	Stadium	Attendance	Record	Report
50	June 1	Phillies	9–2				**Candlestick Park**		28–22	W2
51	June 2	Phillies	6–7				**Candlestick Park**		28–23	L1
52	June 3	Phillies	4–1				**Candlestick Park**		29–23	W1
53	June 5	@ Astros	1–6				Astrodome		29–24	L1
54	June 6	@ Astros	4–3 (12)				Astrodome		30–24	W1
55	June 7	@ Astros	0–3				Astrodome		30–25	L1
56	June 8	@ Reds	6–7				Riverfront Stadium		30–26	L2
57	June 9	@ Reds	10–2				Riverfront Stadium		31–26	W1
58	June 10	@ Reds	9–4				Riverfront Stadium		32–26	W2
59	June 11	Padres	1–0				**Candlestick Park**		33–26	W3
60	June 12	Padres	0–5				**Candlestick Park**		33–27	L1
61	June 13	Padres	2–11				**Candlestick Park**		33–28	L2
62	June 14	Padres	1–4				**Candlestick Park**		33–29	L3
63	June 16	@ Braves	2–7				Atlanta–Fulton County Stadium		33–30	L4
64	June 17	@ Braves	1–6				Atlanta–Fulton County Stadium		33–31	L5
65	June 18	@ Padres	1–3				Jack Murphy Stadium		33–32	L6
66	June 19	@ Padres	7–6				Jack Murphy Stadium		34–32	W1
67	June 20	@ Padres	4–10				Jack Murphy Stadium		34–33	L1
68	June 21	@ Padres	11–2				Jack Murphy Stadium		35–33	W1
69	June 23	Reds	1–4				**Candlestick Park**		35–34	L1
70	June 24	Reds	4–5 (10)				**Candlestick Park**		35–35	L2
71	June 25	Reds	7–6				**Candlestick Park**		36–35	W1
72	June 26	Astros	6–9				**Candlestick Park**		36–36	L1
73	June 27	Astros	5–6				**Candlestick Park**		36–37	L2
74	June 28	Astros	8–4				**Candlestick Park**		37–37	W1
75	June 29	Braves	0–1				**Candlestick Park**		37–38	L1
76	June 30	Braves	5–2				**Candlestick Park**		38–38	W1

July (14–13) (Home: 7–5; Road: 7–8)

#	Date	Opponent	Score	Win	Loss	Save	Stadium	Attendance	Record	Report
77	July 1	Braves	3–8				**Candlestick Park**		38–39	W2
78	July 3	@ Cubs	3–1				Wrigley Field		39–39	W3
79	July 4	@ Cubs	3–5				Wrigley Field		39–40	L1
80	July 5	@ Cubs	7–5				Wrigley Field		40–40	W1
81	July 6	@ Pirates	7–5				Three Rivers Stadium		41–40	W2
82	July 6	@ Pirates	7–4				Three Rivers Stadium		42–40	W3
83	July 7	@ Pirates	4–6 (12)				Three Rivers Stadium		42–41	L1
84	July 8	@ Pirates	8–4 (14)				Three Rivers Stadium		43–41	W1
85	July 9	@ Cardinals	6–7 (10)				Busch Stadium		43–42	L1
86	July 10	@ Cardinals	5–7 (13)				Busch Stadium		43–43	L2
87	July 11	@ Cardinals	3–1				Busch Stadium		44–43	W1
88	July 12	@ Cardinals	2–3				Busch Stadium		44–44	L1
89	July 16	Cubs	1–4				**Candlestick Park**		44–45	L1
90	July 17	Cubs	1–5				**Candlestick Park**		44–46	L2
91	July 18	Cubs	9–2				**Candlestick Park**		45–46	W1
92	July 19	Cubs	4–3				**Candlestick Park**		46–46	W2
93	July 20	Pirates	6–7				**Candlestick Park**		46–47	L1
94	July 21	Pirates	7–0				**Candlestick Park**		47–47	W1
95	July 22	Pirates	0–4				**Candlestick Park**		47–48	L1
96	July 24	Cardinals	4–3				**Candlestick Park**		48–48	W1
97	July 25	Cardinals	5–4				**Candlestick Park**		49–48	W2
98	July 26	Cardinals	6–3 (10)				**Candlestick Park**		50–48	W3
99	July 26	Cardinals	5–2				**Candlestick Park**		51–48	W4
100	July 27	@ Dodgers	5–6 (12)				Dodger Stadium		51–49	L1
101	July 28	@ Dodgers	2–4				Dodger Stadium		51–50	L2
102	July 29	@ Dodgers	16–2				Dodger Stadium		52–50	W1
103	July 31	@ Reds	2–9				Riverfront Stadium		52–51	L1

August (18–11) (Home: 11–4; Road: 7–7)

#	Date	Opponent	Score	Win	Loss	Save	Stadium	Attendance	Record	Report
104	August 1	@ Reds	7–3				Riverfront Stadium		53–51	W1
105	August 2	@ Reds	4–5 (11)				Riverfront Stadium		53–52	L1
106	August 3	@ Astros	3–5 (13)				Astrodome		53–53	L2
107	August 4	@ Astros	4–5				Astrodome		53–54	L3
108	August 5	@ Astros	5–6 (11)				Astrodome		53–55	L4
109	August 7	Reds	3–1				**Candlestick Park**		54–55	W1
110	August 8	Reds	5–2				**Candlestick Park**		55–55	W2
111	August 9	Reds	3–2				**Candlestick Park**		56–55	W3
112	August 9	Reds	5–2				**Candlestick Park**		57–55	W4
113	August 10	Astros	6–5				**Candlestick Park**		58–55	W5
114	August 11	Astros	3–7				**Candlestick Park**		58–56	L1
115	August 12	Astros	8–1				**Candlestick Park**		59–56	W1
116	August 13	Astros	7–6 (11)				**Candlestick Park**		60–56	W2
117	August 14	Dodgers	3–4				**Candlestick Park**		60–57	L1
118	August 15	Dodgers	5–0				**Candlestick Park**		61–57	W1
119	August 16	Dodgers	1–0 (10)				**Candlestick Park**		62–57	W2
120	August 18	@ Mets	2–7				Shea Stadium		62–58	L1
121	August 19	@ Mets	10–6 (10)				Shea Stadium		63–58	W1
122	August 20	@ Mets	4–7				Shea Stadium		63–59	L1
123	August 21	@ Expos	6–3				Olympic Stadium		64–59	W1
124	August 22	@ Expos	4–5 (10)				Olympic Stadium		64–60	L1
125	August 23	@ Expos	5–3				Olympic Stadium		65–60	W1
126	August 24	@ Phillies	6–1				Veterans Stadium		66–60	W2
127	August 25	@ Phillies	3–2				Veterans Stadium		67–60	W3
128	August 26	@ Phillies	2–0				Veterans Stadium		68–60	W4
129	August 28	Mets	0–4				**Candlestick Park**		68–61	L1
130	August 29	Mets	9–1				**Candlestick Park**		69–61	W1
131	August 30	Mets	3–5				**Candlestick Park**		69–62	L1
132	August 31	Expos	5–0				**Candlestick Park**		70–62	W1

September (18–8) (Home: 10–4; Road: 8–4)

#	Date	Opponent	Score	Win	Loss	Save	Stadium	Attendance	Record	Report
133	September 1	Expos	14–4				**Candlestick Park**		71–62	W2
134	September 2	Expos	3–7				**Candlestick Park**		71–63	L1
135	September 4	Phillies	3–2 (10)				**Candlestick Park**		72–63	W1
136	September 5	Phillies	6–3				**Candlestick Park**		73–63	W2
137	September 6	Phillies	4–1				**Candlestick Park**		74–63	W3
138	September 7	@ Astros	2–4				Astrodome		74–64	L1
139	September 8	@ Astros	6–4				Astrodome		75–64	W1
140	September 9	@ Astros	2–4				Astrodome		75–65	L1
141	September 11	@ Reds	3–4				Riverfront Stadium		75–66	L2
142	September 12	@ Reds	7–1				Riverfront Stadium		76–66	W1
143	September 13	@ Reds	6–1				Riverfront Stadium		77–66	W2
144	September 14	Padres	4–3				**Candlestick Park**		78–66	W3
145	September 15	Padres	13–3				**Candlestick Park**		79–66	W4
146	September 16	Astros	7–1				**Candlestick Park**		80–66	W5
147	September 17	Astros	4–0				**Candlestick Park**		81–66	W6
148	September 19	Reds	5–1				**Candlestick Park**		82–66	W7
149	September 20	Reds	6–10				**Candlestick Park**		82–67	L1
150	September 21	Dodgers	2–4				**Candlestick Park**		82–68	L2
151	September 22	Dodgers	3–4				**Candlestick Park**		82–69	L3
152	September 23	Dodgers	9–8				**Candlestick Park**		83–69	W1
153	September 25	@ Braves	9–2				Atlanta–Fulton County Stadium		84–69	W2
154	September 26	@ Braves	5–10				Atlanta–Fulton County Stadium		84–70	L1
155	September 27	@ Braves	15–6				Atlanta–Fulton County Stadium		85–70	W1
156	September 28	@ Padres	5–4				Jack Murphy Stadium		86–70	W2
157	September 29	@ Padres	5–3				Jack Murphy Stadium		87–70	W3
158	September 30	@ Dodgers	3–0				Dodger Stadium		88–70	W4

October (2–2) (Home: 2–1; Road: 0–1)

#	Date	Opponent	Score	Win	Loss	Save	Stadium	Attendance	Record	Report
159	October 1	@ Dodgers	0–7				Dodger Stadium		88–71	L1
160	October 2	Braves	4–6				**Candlestick Park**		88–72	L2
161	October 3	Braves	6–3				**Candlestick Park**		89–72	W1
162	October 4	Braves	5–4 (10)				**Candlestick Park**		90–72	W2

=== Postseason ===
1987 Postseason Game Log
National League Championship Series (3–4)

Game	Date	Opponent	Score	Win	Loss	Save	Stadium	Attendance	Series	Report
1 NLCS	October 6	@ Cardinals	3–5	Mathews (1–0)	**Reuschel** (0–1)	Dayley (1)	Busch Stadium	55,331	0–1	L1
2 NLCS	October 7	@ Cardinals	5–0	**Dravecky** (1–0)	Tudor (0–1)		Busch Stadium	55,331	1–1	W1
3 NLCS	October 9	Cardinals	5–6	Forsch (1–0)	**Robinson** (0–1)	Worrell (1)	**Candlestick Park**	57,913	1–2	L1
4 NLCS	October 10	Cardinals	4–2	**Krukow** (1–0)	Cox (0–1)		**Candlestick Park**	57,997	2–2	W1
5 NLCS	October 11	Cardinals	6–3	**Price** (1–0)	Forsch (1–1)		**Candlestick Park**	59,363	3–2	W2
6 NLCS	October 13	@ Cardinals	0–1	Tudor (1–1)	**Dravecky** (1–1)	Dayley (2)	Busch Stadium	55,331	3–3	L1
7 NLCS	October 14	@ Cardinals	0–6	Cox (1–1)	**Hammaker** (0–1)		Busch Stadium	55,331	3–4	L2

=== Roster ===
1987 San Francisco Giants
**Roster**
**Pitchers**: 26,49 Randy Bockus; 51,40 John Burkett; 55,36 Keith Comstock; 13,32 Mark Davis; 37 Kelly Downs; 43 Dave Dravecky; 50 Scott Garrelts; 51 Jim Gott; 52,55 Mark Grant; 14 Atlee Hammaker; 39 Mike Krukow; 29 Mike LaCoss; 32 Craig Lefferts; 48 Roger Mason; 38 Greg Minton; 46 Jon Perlman; 47 Joe Price; 48 Rick Reuschel; 48,40 Don Robinson; 49 Jeff Robinson	**Catchers**: 15 Bob Brenly; 17 Kirt Manwaring; 7 Bob Melvin; 10,17 Mackey Sasser; **Infielders**: 35 Chris Brown; 22 Will Clark; 9 Iván DeJesús; 18 Francisco Meléndez; 9 Kevin Mitchell; 2 Chris Speier; 16 Harry Spilman; 6 Robby Thompson; 23 José Uribe; 12 Mark Wasinger; 9 Rob Wilfong; 60,10 Matt Williams; 41 Mike Woodard	**Outfielders**: 1 Mike Aldrete; 30,33 Chili Davis; 41 Dave Henderson; 19 Randy Kutcher; 00 Jeffrey Leonard; 21 Candy Maldonado; 20 Eddie Milner; 26 Jessie Reid; 8 Joel Youngblood	**Manager**: 33 Roger Craig; **Coaches**: 42 Bill Fahey (First base); 5 Bob Lillis (Bench); 28 Jose Morales (Hitting); 34 Norm Sherry (Pitching); 1 Don Zimmer (Third base)

== Player stats ==
= Indicates team leader

=== Batting ===
==== Starters by position ====
Note: Pos = Position; G = Games played; AB = At bats; H = Hits; Avg. = Batting average; HR = Home runs; RBI = Runs batted in

Pos	Player	G	AB	H	Avg.	HR	RBI
C	Bob Brenly	123	375	100	.267	18	51
1B	Will Clark	150	529	163	.308	35	91
2B	Robby Thompson	132	420	110	.262	10	44
3B	Kevin Mitchell	69	268	82	.306	15	44
SS	José Uribe	95	309	90	.291	5	30
LF	Jeffrey Leonard	131	503	141	.280	19	63
CF	Chili Davis	149	500	125	.250	24	76
RF	Candy Maldonado	118	442	129	.292	20	85

==== Other batters ====
Note: G = Games played; AB = At bats; H = Hits; Avg. = Batting average; HR = Home runs; RBI = Runs batted in

Player	G	AB	H	Avg.	HR	RBI
Mike Aldrete	126	357	116	.325	9	51
Chris Speier	111	317	79	.249	11	39
Bob Melvin	84	246	49	.199	11	31
Matt Williams	84	245	46	.188	8	21
Eddie Milner	101	214	54	.252	4	19
Chris Brown	38	132	32	.242	6	17
Joel Youngblood	69	91	23	.253	3	11
Harry Spilman	83	90	24	.267	1	14
Mark Wasinger	44	80	22	.275	1	3
Dave Henderson	15	21	5	.238	0	1
Mike Woodard	10	19	4	.211	0	1
Randy Kutcher	14	16	3	.188	0	1
Francisco Meléndez	12	16	5	.313	1	1
Iván DeJesús	9	10	2	.200	0	1
Jessie Reid	6	8	1	.125	1	1
Rob Wilfong	2	8	1	.125	1	2
Kirt Manwaring	6	7	1	.143	0	0
Mackey Sasser	2	4	0	.000	0	0

=== Pitching ===
==== Starting pitchers ====
Note: G = Games pitched; IP = Innings pitched; W = Wins; L = Losses; ERA = Earned run average; SO = Strikeouts

Player	G	IP	W	L	ERA	SO
Atlee Hammaker	31	168.1	10	10	3.58	107
Mike Krukow	30	163.0	5	6	4.80	104
Dave Dravecky	18	112.1	7	5	3.20	78
Rick Reuschel	9	50.0	5	3	4.32	27
Roger Mason	5	26.0	1	1	4.50	18

==== Other pitchers ====
Note: G = Games pitched; IP = Innings pitched; W = Wins; L = Losses; ERA = Earned run average; SO = Strikeouts

Player	G	IP	W	L	ERA	SO
Kelly Downs	41	186.0	12	9	3.63	137
Mike LaCoss	39	171.0	13	10	3.68	79
Mark Davis	20	70.2	4	5	4.71	51
Mark Grant	16	61.0	1	2	3.54	32

==== Relief pitchers ====
Note: G = Games pitched; W = Wins; L = Losses; SV = Saves; ERA = Earned run average; SO = Strikeouts

Player	G	W	L	SV	ERA	SO
Scott Garrelts	64	11	7	12	3.22	127
Jeff Robinson	63	6	8	10	2.79	82
Craig Lefferts	44	3	3	4	3.23	18
Jim Gott	30	1	0	0	4.50	63
Don Robinson	25	5	1	7	2.74	26
Joe Price	20	2	2	1	2.57	42
Greg Minton	15	1	0	1	3.47	9
Keith Comstock	15	2	0	1	3.05	21
Randy Bockus	12	1	0	0	3.63	9
Jon Perlman	10	0	0	0	3.97	3
John Burkett	3	0	0	0	4.50	5

== Award winners ==
- Chris Speier, 2B, Willie Mac Award

All-Star Game

== Farm system ==
Level	Team	League	Manager
AAA	Phoenix Firebirds	Pacific Coast League	Wendell Kim
AA	Shreveport Captains	Texas League	Jack Mull
A	Fresno Giants	California League	R. J. Harrison
A	Clinton Giants	Midwest League	Bill Evers
A-Short Season	Everett Giants	Northwest League	Joe Strain
Rookie	Pocatello Giants	Pioneer League	Rafael Landestoy

LEAGUE CHAMPIONS: Fresno
