= 1987 San Diego Padres season =

1987 San Diego Padres
- League: National League
- Division: West
- Ballpark: Jack Murphy Stadium
- City: San Diego, California
- Record: 65–97 (.401)
- Divisional place: 6th
- Owners: Joan Kroc
- General managers: Jack McKeon
- Managers: Larry Bowa
- Television: KUSI-TV; San Diego Cable Sports Network (Dave Campbell, Jerry Coleman, Bob Chandler, Ted Leitner)
- Radio: KFMB (AM) (Dave Campbell, Jerry Coleman); XEXX (Gustavo Lopez, Mario Thomas Zapiain, Eduardo Ortega)

The 1987 San Diego Padres season was the 19th in franchise history. Rookie catcher Benito Santiago hit in 34 straight games, and later won the NL Rookie of the Year Award. The Padres were the only team not to hit a grand slam in 1987.

== Offseason ==
- October 9, 1986: Dane Iorg was released by the Padres.
- December 11, 1986: Kevin McReynolds, Gene Walter, and Adam Ging (minors) were traded by the Padres to the New York Mets for Kevin Mitchell, Shawn Abner, Stan Jefferson, Kevin Armstrong (minors) and Kevin Brown (minors).
- December 18, 1986: Graig Nettles was released by the Padres.
- January 13, 1987: Tom Gorman was signed as a free agent by the Padres.

== Regular season ==
=== Season standings ===
NL West
Team	W	L	Pct.	GB	Home	Road
San Francisco Giants	90	72	.556	—	46‍–‍35	44‍–‍37
Cincinnati Reds	84	78	.519	6	42‍–‍39	42‍–‍39
Houston Astros	76	86	.469	14	47‍–‍34	29‍–‍52
Los Angeles Dodgers	73	89	.451	17	40‍–‍41	33‍–‍48
Atlanta Braves	69	92	.429	20½	42‍–‍39	27‍–‍53
San Diego Padres	65	97	.401	25	37‍–‍44	28‍–‍53

=== Record vs. opponents ===
1987 National League record Sources:
Team	ATL	CHC	CIN	HOU	LAD	MON	NYM	PHI	PIT	SD	SF	STL
Atlanta	—	6–5	8–10	8–10	6–12	3–9	7–5	7–5	7–5	6–12	8–10	3–9
Chicago	5–6	—	6–6	8–4	6–6	10–8	9–9	8–10	4–14	9–3	5–7	6–12
Cincinnati	10–8	6–6	—	13–5	10–8	6–6	7–5	5–7	4–8	12–6	7–11	4–8
Houston	10–8	4–8	5–13	—	12–6	7–5	6–6	6–6	6–6	5–13	10–8	5–7
Los Angeles	12–6	6–6	8–10	6–12	—	3–9	6–6	2–10	6–6	11–7	10–8	3–9
Montreal	9–3	8–10	6–6	5–7	9–3	—	8–10	10–8	11–7	9–3	5–7	11–7
New York	5–7	9–9	5–7	6–6	6–6	10–8	—	13–5	12–6	8–4	9–3	9–9
Philadelphia	5–7	10–8	7–5	6–6	10–2	8–10	5–13	—	11–7	8–4	2–10	8–10
Pittsburgh	5–7	14–4	8–4	6–6	6–6	7–11	6–12	7–11	—	8–4	6–6	7–11
San Diego	12–6	3–9	6–12	13–5	7–11	3–9	4–8	4–8	4–8	—	5–13	4–8
San Francisco	10–8	7–5	11–7	8–10	8–10	7–5	3–9	10–2	6–6	13–5	—	7–5
St. Louis	9–3	12–6	8–4	7–5	9–3	7–11	9–9	10–8	11–7	8–4	5–7	—

=== Opening Day starters ===
- Tim Flannery
- Steve Garvey
- Tony Gwynn
- Andy Hawkins
- John Kruk
- Kevin Mitchell
- Benito Santiago
- Garry Templeton
- Marvell Wynne

=== Notable transactions ===
- April 25, 1987: Mark Wasinger and Tim Meagher (minors) were traded by the Padres to the San Francisco Giants for Colin Ward and Steve Miller (minors).
- June 4, 1987: Tom Gorman was traded by the Padres to the Minnesota Twins for Dave Blakely (minors).
- July 5, 1987: Kevin Mitchell, Dave Dravecky and Craig Lefferts were traded by the Padres to the San Francisco Giants for Chris Brown, Keith Comstock, Mark Davis, and Mark Grant.
- August 30, 1987: Storm Davis was traded by the Padres to the Oakland Athletics for players to be named later. The Athletics completed the deal by sending Dave Leiper to the Padres on August 31 and sending Rob Nelson to the Padres on September 8.

=== Roster ===
1987 San Diego Padres
Roster
Pitchers: 51 Greg Booker; 32 Keith Comstock; 13 Mark Davis; 34 Storm Davis; 43 Dave Dravecky; 39 Tom Gorman; 54 Goose Gossage; 55 Mark Grant; 40 Andy Hawkins; 25 Ray Hayward; 45 Jimmy Jones; 37 Craig Lefferts; 43 Dave Leiper; 41 Lance McCullers; 37 Eric Nolte; 30 Eric Show; 31 Ed Whitson; 26 Ed Wojna	Catchers: 15 Bruce Bochy; 27 Mark Parent; 9 Benito Santiago; Infielders: 35 Chris Brown; 4 Joey Cora; 11 Tim Flannery; 6 Steve Garvey; 8,44 John Kruk; 7 Kevin Mitchell; 7 Rob Nelson; 5 Randy Ready; 24 Luis Salazar; 1 Garry Templeton	Outfielders: 28 Shawn Abner; 47 Randy Byers; 19 Tony Gwynn; 22 Stan Jefferson; 23 Shane Mack; 14 Carmelo Martínez; 21 Jim Steels; 7 Marvell Wynne	Manager: 10 Larry Bowa; Coaches: 2 Sandy Alomar Sr. (Third base); 36 Galen Cisco (Pitching); 33 Harry Dunlop (Bullpen); 29 Deacon Jones (First base & hitting); 38 Greg Riddoch (Bench)

== Player stats ==
=== Batting ===
==== Starters by position ====
Note: Pos = Position; G = Games played; AB = At bats; H = Hits; Avg. = Batting average; HR = Home runs; RBI = Runs batted in

Pos	Player	G	AB	H	Avg.	HR	RBI
C	Benito Santiago	146	546	164	.300	18	79
1B	John Kruk	138	447	140	.313	20	91
2B	Tim Flannery	106	276	63	.228	0	20
3B	Kevin Mitchell	62	196	48	.245	7	26
SS	Garry Templeton	148	510	113	.222	5	48
LF	Carmelo Martínez	139	447	122	.273	15	70
CF	Stan Jefferson	116	422	97	.230	8	29
RF	Tony Gwynn	157	589	218	.370	7	54

==== Other batters ====
Note: G = Games played; AB = At bats; H = Hits; Avg. = Batting average; HR = Home runs; RBI = Runs batted in

Player	G	AB	H	Avg.	HR	RBI
Randy Ready	124	350	108	.309	12	54
Joey Cora	77	241	57	.237	0	13
Shane Mack	105	238	57	.239	4	25
Luis Salazar	84	189	48	.254	3	17
Marvell Wynne	98	188	47	.250	2	24
Chris Brown	44	155	36	.232	6	23
Steve Garvey	27	76	16	.211	1	9
Bruce Bochy	38	75	12	.160	2	11
Jim Steels	62	68	13	.191	0	6
Shawn Abner	16	47	13	.277	2	7
Mark Parent	12	25	2	.080	0	2
Randy Byers	10	16	5	.313	0	1
Rob Nelson	10	11	1	.083	0	1

=== Pitching ===
==== Starting pitchers ====
Note: G = Games pitched; IP = Innings pitched; W = Wins; L = Losses; ERA = Earned run average; SO = Strikeouts

Player	G	IP	W	L	ERA	SO
Eric Show	34	206.1	8	16	3.84	117
Ed Whitson	36	205.2	10	13	4.73	135
Andy Hawkins	24	117.2	3	10	5.05	51
Mark Grant	17	102.1	6	7	4.66	58
Eric Nolte	12	67.1	2	6	3.21	44

==== Other pitchers ====
Note: G = Games pitched; IP = Innings pitched; W = Wins; L = Losses; ERA = Earned run average; SO = Strikeouts

Player	G	IP	W	L	ERA	SO
Jimmy Jones	30	145.2	9	7	4.14	51
Dave Dravecky	30	79.0	3	7	3.76	60
Storm Davis	21	62.2	2	7	6.18	37
Ed Wojna	5	18.1	0	3	5.89	13

==== Relief pitchers ====
Note: G = Games pitched; W = Wins; L = Losses; SV = Saves; ERA = Earned run average; SO = Strikeouts

Player	G	W	L	SV	ERA	SO
Lance McCullers	78	8	10	16	3.72	126
Rich Gossage	40	5	4	11	3.12	44
Greg Booker	44	1	1	1	3.16	17
Mark Davis	43	5	3	2	3.18	47
Craig Lefferts	33	2	2	2	4.38	39
Keith Comstock	26	0	1	0	5.50	38
Dave Leiper	12	1	0	1	4.50	10
Tom Gorman	6	0	0	0	4.09	8
Ray Hayward	4	0	0	0	16.50	2
Luis Salazar	2	0	0	0	4.50	0

== Awards and honors ==
- Benito Santiago, Rookie of the Year
- Tony Gwynn, National League Batting Champion, .370

1987 Major League Baseball All-Star Game

== Farm system ==
Level	Team	League	Manager
AAA	Las Vegas Stars	Pacific Coast League	Jack Krol
AA	Wichita Pilots	Texas League	Steve Smith
A	Reno Padres	California League	Pat Kelly
A	Charleston Rainbows	South Atlantic League	Tony Torchia
A-Short Season	Spokane Indians	Northwest League	Rob Picciolo

LEAGUE CHAMPIONS: Spokane
