= Jesse Reid =

Jesse Reid may refer to:

- Jesse Reid (boxing trainer)
- Jesse Reid (field hockey)

== See also ==
- Jesse Reed (disambiguation)
- Jessie Reid, American baseball player
- Jessie Reed, American model
