= 1987 New York Mets season =

1987 New York Mets
- League: National League
- Division: East
- Ballpark: Shea Stadium
- City: New York
- Record: 92–70 (.568)
- Divisional place: 2nd
- Owners: Fred Wilpon and Nelson Doubleday, Jr.
- General manager: Frank Cashen
- Manager: Davey Johnson
- Television: WOR-TV/SportsChannel New York (Ralph Kiner, Steve Zabriskie, Tim McCarver, Fran Healy, Rusty Staub)
- Radio: WHN (Bob Murphy, Gary Thorne); WJIT (Spanish) (Juan Alicea, Billy Berroa)

The 1987 New York Mets season was the 26th regular season for the Mets. The Mets entered the season as the defending World Series champions. They went 92–70 and finished second in the National League East, three games behind the first place St. Louis Cardinals. They were managed by Davey Johnson. The team played home games at Shea Stadium.

== Offseason ==
- November 12, 1986: Ron Gardenhire was traded by the Mets to the Minnesota Twins for a player to be named later. The Twins completed the deal by sending Dominic Iasparro (minors) to the Mets on April 4, 1987.
- December 9, 1986: Heathcliff Slocumb was drafted from the Mets by the Chicago Cubs in the 1986 minor league draft.
- December 11, 1986: Kevin Mitchell, Stan Jefferson, Shawn Abner, Kevin Armstrong (minors) and Kevin Brown (minors) were traded by the Mets to the San Diego Padres for Kevin McReynolds, Gene Walter, and Adam Ging (minors).
- December 17, 1986: Doug Gwosdz was traded by the Mets to the Seattle Mariners for Ricky Nelson.
- February 9, 1987: Clint Hurdle was signed as a free agent by the Mets.
- March 27, 1987: Ed Hearn, Rick Anderson, and Mauro Gozzo were traded by the Mets to the Kansas City Royals for David Cone and Chris Jelic.

== Regular season ==
- June 5, 1987: A mock ceremony called "Spider-Man's wedding" took place to promote a special wedding issue of the Amazing Spider-Man comic book at home plate in front of more than 45,000 fans just before the New York Mets played the Pittsburgh Pirates. Actors portrayed as fictional comic book characters Spider-Man and Mary Jane Watson (wearing a wedding gown designed by Willi Smith), participated in the ceremony. Stan Lee, publisher of Marvel Comics and co-creator of Spider-Man officiated the ceremony prior to the Mets match. The Mets won the game against the Pirates afterwards, 5–1.

=== Standings ===
NL East
Team	W	L	Pct.	GB	Home	Road
St. Louis Cardinals	95	67	.586	—	49‍–‍32	46‍–‍35
New York Mets	92	70	.568	3	49‍–‍32	43‍–‍38
Montreal Expos	91	71	.562	4	48‍–‍33	43‍–‍38
Philadelphia Phillies	80	82	.494	15	43‍–‍38	37‍–‍44
Pittsburgh Pirates	80	82	.494	15	47‍–‍34	33‍–‍48
Chicago Cubs	76	85	.472	18½	40‍–‍40	36‍–‍45

=== Record vs. opponents ===
1987 National League record Sources:
Team	ATL	CHC	CIN	HOU	LAD	MON	NYM	PHI	PIT	SD	SF	STL
Atlanta	—	6–5	8–10	8–10	6–12	3–9	7–5	7–5	7–5	6–12	8–10	3–9
Chicago	5–6	—	6–6	8–4	6–6	10–8	9–9	8–10	4–14	9–3	5–7	6–12
Cincinnati	10–8	6–6	—	13–5	10–8	6–6	7–5	5–7	4–8	12–6	7–11	4–8
Houston	10–8	4–8	5–13	—	12–6	7–5	6–6	6–6	6–6	5–13	10–8	5–7
Los Angeles	12–6	6–6	8–10	6–12	—	3–9	6–6	2–10	6–6	11–7	10–8	3–9
Montreal	9–3	8–10	6–6	5–7	9–3	—	8–10	10–8	11–7	9–3	5–7	11–7
New York	5–7	9–9	5–7	6–6	6–6	10–8	—	13–5	12–6	8–4	9–3	9–9
Philadelphia	5–7	10–8	7–5	6–6	10–2	8–10	5–13	—	11–7	8–4	2–10	8–10
Pittsburgh	5–7	14–4	8–4	6–6	6–6	7–11	6–12	7–11	—	8–4	6–6	7–11
San Diego	12–6	3–9	6–12	13–5	7–11	3–9	4–8	4–8	4–8	—	5–13	4–8
San Francisco	10–8	7–5	11–7	8–10	8–10	7–5	3–9	10–2	6–6	13–5	—	7–5
St. Louis	9–3	12–6	8–4	7–5	9–3	7–11	9–9	10–8	11–7	8–4	5–7	—

=== Milestones ===
- Howard Johnson became the eighth member of the 30–30 club by hitting for at least 30 home runs and getting at least 30 stolen bases in the same season. Johnson was the first infielder to join the 30–30 club.
- Darryl Strawberry became the second Met in the season and the tenth member overall of the 30–30 club

=== Notable transactions ===
- May 11, 1987: Ricky Nelson was traded by the Mets to the Cleveland Indians for Don Schulze.
- June 2, 1987: 1987 Major League Baseball draft
  - Todd Hundley was drafted by the Mets in the 2nd round. Player signed June 15, 1987.
  - Eric Hillman was drafted by the New York Mets in the 16th round of the 1987 amateur draft. Player signed June 5, 1987.
  - Anthony Young was drafted by the Mets in the 38th round. Player signed June 6, 1987.
- September 15, 1987: Jeff Richardson and Shane Young (minors) were traded by the Mets to the California Angels for John Candelaria.

=== Game log ===
Legend
Mets Win	Mets Loss	Game Postponed	Eliminated from playoff spot
Bold = Mets team member

1987 Game Log
Overall: 92–70 (Home: 49–32; Away: 43–38)
April: (11–9) Home: 6–5; Away: 5–4

#	Date	Opponent	Score	Win	Loss	Save	Location	Attendance	Record

May: (13–14) Home: 7–7; Away: 6–7

#	Date	Opponent	Score	Win	Loss	Save	Location	Attendance	Record

June: (16–12) Home: 9–3; Away: 7–9

#	Date	Opponent	Score	Win	Loss	Save	Location	Attendance	Record

July: (16–11) Home: 7–5; Away: 9–6

#	Date	Opponent	Score	Win	Loss	Save	Location	Attendance	Record

August: (18–11) Home: 12–7; Away: 6–4

#	Date	Opponent	Score	Win	Loss	Save	Location	Attendance	Record

September: (16–12) Home: 8–5; Away: 8–7

#	Date	Opponent	Score	Win	Loss	Save	Location	Attendance	Record

October: (2–1) Home: 0–0; Away: 2–1

#	Date	Opponent	Score	Win	Loss	Save	Location	Attendance	Record

== Roster ==
1987 New York Mets
Roster
Pitchers: 15 Rick Aguilera; 45 John Candelaria; 44 David Cone; 12 Ron Darling; 32 Tom Edens; 50 Sid Fernandez; 38 Bob Gibson; 16 Dwight Gooden; 40 Jeff Innis; 26 Terry Leach; 42 Roger McDowell; 43 John Mitchell; 48 Randy Myers; 19 Bob Ojeda; 47 Jesse Orosco; 49 Don Schulze; 39 Doug Sisk; 31 Gene Walter	Catchers: 8 Gary Carter; 33 Barry Lyons; Infielders: 2 Bill Almon; 6 Wally Backman; 21 Kevin Elster; 17 Keith Hernandez; 7 Clint Hurdle; 20 Howard Johnson; 29 Dave Magadan; 25 Keith Miller; 25 Al Pedrique; 3 Rafael Santana; 11 Tim Teufel	Outfielders: 32 Mark Carreon; 4 Len Dykstra; 13 Lee Mazzilli; 22 Kevin McReynolds; 18 Darryl Strawberry; 1 Mookie Wilson; Other batters: 9 Gregg Jefferies; 27 Randy Milligan	Manager: 5 Davey Johnson; Coaches: 23 Bud Harrelson; 51 Vern Hoscheit; 34 Sam Perlozzo; 28 Bill Robinson; 30 Mel Stottlemyre

== Player stats ==
=== Batting ===
==== Starters by position ====
Note: Pos = Position; G = Games played; AB = At bats; H = Hits; Avg. = Batting average; HR = Home runs; RBI = Runs batted in

Pos	Player	G	AB	H	Avg.	HR	RBI
C	Gary Carter	139	523	123	.235	20	83
1B	Keith Hernandez	154	587	170	.290	18	89
2B	Wally Backman	94	300	75	.250	1	23
3B	Howard Johnson	157	554	147	.265	36	99
SS	Rafael Santana	139	439	112	.255	5	44
LF	Kevin McReynolds	151	590	163	.276	29	95
CF	Lenny Dykstra	132	431	123	.285	10	43
RF	Darryl Strawberry	154	532	151	.284	39	104

==== Other batters ====
Note: G = Games played; AB = At bats; H = Hits; Avg. = Batting average; HR = Home runs; RBI = Runs batted in

Player	G	AB	H	Avg.	HR	RBI
Mookie Wilson	124	385	115	.299	9	34
Tim Teufel	97	299	92	.308	14	61
Dave Magadan	85	192	61	.318	3	24
Barry Lyons	53	130	33	.254	4	24
Lee Mazzilli	88	124	38	.306	3	24
Bill Almon	49	54	13	.241	0	4
Keith Miller	25	51	19	.373	0	1
Mark Carreon	9	12	3	.250	0	1
Kevin Elster	5	10	4	.400	0	1
Al Pedrique	5	6	0	.000	0	0
Gregg Jefferies	6	6	3	.500	0	2
Clint Hurdle	3	3	1	.333	0	0
Randy Milligan	3	1	0	.000	0	0

=== Pitching ===
==== Starting pitchers ====
Note: G = Games pitched; IP = Innings pitched; W = Wins; L = Losses; ERA = Earned run average; SO = Strikeouts

Player	G	IP	W	L	ERA	SO
Ron Darling	32	207.2	12	8	4.29	167
Dwight Gooden	25	179.2	15	7	3.21	148
Sid Fernandez	28	156.0	12	8	3.81	134
Rick Aguilera	18	115.0	11	3	3.60	77
John Mitchell	20	111.2	3	6	4.11	57
Bob Ojeda	10	46.1	3	5	3.88	21
Don Schulze	5	21.2	1	2	6.23	5
John Candelaria	3	12.1	2	0	5.84	10
Tom Edens	2	8.0	0	0	6.75	4

==== Other pitchers ====
Note: G = Games pitched; IP = Innings pitched; W = Wins; L = Losses; ERA = Earned run average; SO = Strikeouts

Player	G	IP	W	L	ERA	SO
Terry Leach	44	131.1	11	1	3.22	61
David Cone	21	99.1	5	6	3.71	68

==== Relief pitchers ====
Note: G = Games pitched; W = Wins; L = Losses; SV = Saves; ERA = Earned run average; SO = Strikeouts

Player	G	W	L	SV	ERA	SO
Roger McDowell	56	7	5	25	4.16	32
Jesse Orosco	58	3	9	16	4.44	78
Doug Sisk	55	3	1	3	3.46	37
Randy Myers	54	3	6	6	3.96	92
Gene Walter	21	1	2	0	3.20	11
Jeff Innis	17	0	1	0	3.16	28
Bob Gibson	1	0	0	0	0.00	2

== Awards and honors ==
- Darryl Strawberry – Player of the Month, September 1987

All-Star Game

== Farm system ==
Level	Team	League	Manager
AAA	Tidewater Tides	International League	Mike Cubbage
AA	Jackson Mets	Texas League	Tucker Ashford
A	Lynchburg Mets	Carolina League	John Tamargo
A	Columbia Mets	South Atlantic League	Butch Hobson
A-Short Season	Little Falls Mets	New York–Penn League	Rich Miller
Rookie	Kingsport Mets	Appalachian League	Bobby Floyd
