= Jesse Reed =

Jesse Reed may refer to:

- Jesse Reed, friend of Kurt Cobain
- Jesse Reed, Principal Chiefs of the Cherokee

== See also ==
- Jesse Reid (disambiguation)
- Jessie Reid, baseball player
