= 1987 Atlanta Braves season =

1987 Atlanta Braves
- League: National League
- Division: West
- Ballpark: Atlanta–Fulton County Stadium
- City: Atlanta
- Record: 69–92 (.429)
- Divisional place: 5th
- Owners: Ted Turner
- General managers: Bobby Cox
- Managers: Chuck Tanner
- Television: WTBS; Superstation WTBS
- Radio: WSB (Ernie Johnson, Pete Van Wieren, Skip Caray, John Sterling)

The 1987 Atlanta Braves season was the 117th in franchise history and their 22nd in Atlanta. The team introduced new uniforms this season harkening back to the 1950s, which, with a slight change made in 2019, continue to be the team's uniforms to this day, replacing their pullover jersey/beltless pants combo worn since 1980.

== Offseason ==
- November 17, 1986: Chuck Hensley was signed as a free agent with the Atlanta Braves.
- November 17, 1986: Trench Davis was signed as a free agent with the Atlanta Braves.
- February 2, 1987: Luis Leal was traded by the Toronto Blue Jays with Damaso Garcia to the Atlanta Braves for Craig McMurtry.

== Regular season ==
- May 1, 1987: Houston Astros pitcher Nolan Ryan hit a home run off of Braves pitcher Charlie Puleo.
- August 17, 1987: Tom Glavine made his major league baseball debut. It was against the Houston Astros and Glavine was the starting pitcher. Glavine pitched 3.2 innings and allowed 10 hits and six earned runs. Glavine allowed 5 bases on balls and recorded one strikeout.
- September 27, 1987: 48-year old Phil Niekro is signed by the Braves for one final major league start against the San Francisco Giants. Niekro had been released by the Toronto Blue Jays almost a month earlier. He pitches three innings, giving up six hits and 5 runs in a 15-6 loss.

=== Season standings ===
NL West
Team	W	L	Pct.	GB	Home	Road
San Francisco Giants	90	72	.556	—	46‍–‍35	44‍–‍37
Cincinnati Reds	84	78	.519	6	42‍–‍39	42‍–‍39
Houston Astros	76	86	.469	14	47‍–‍34	29‍–‍52
Los Angeles Dodgers	73	89	.451	17	40‍–‍41	33‍–‍48
Atlanta Braves	69	92	.429	20½	42‍–‍39	27‍–‍53
San Diego Padres	65	97	.401	25	37‍–‍44	28‍–‍53

=== Record vs. opponents ===
1987 National League record Sources:
Team	ATL	CHC	CIN	HOU	LAD	MON	NYM	PHI	PIT	SD	SF	STL
Atlanta	—	6–5	8–10	8–10	6–12	3–9	7–5	7–5	7–5	6–12	8–10	3–9
Chicago	5–6	—	6–6	8–4	6–6	10–8	9–9	8–10	4–14	9–3	5–7	6–12
Cincinnati	10–8	6–6	—	13–5	10–8	6–6	7–5	5–7	4–8	12–6	7–11	4–8
Houston	10–8	4–8	5–13	—	12–6	7–5	6–6	6–6	6–6	5–13	10–8	5–7
Los Angeles	12–6	6–6	8–10	6–12	—	3–9	6–6	2–10	6–6	11–7	10–8	3–9
Montreal	9–3	8–10	6–6	5–7	9–3	—	8–10	10–8	11–7	9–3	5–7	11–7
New York	5–7	9–9	5–7	6–6	6–6	10–8	—	13–5	12–6	8–4	9–3	9–9
Philadelphia	5–7	10–8	7–5	6–6	10–2	8–10	5–13	—	11–7	8–4	2–10	8–10
Pittsburgh	5–7	14–4	8–4	6–6	6–6	7–11	6–12	7–11	—	8–4	6–6	7–11
San Diego	12–6	3–9	6–12	13–5	7–11	3–9	4–8	4–8	4–8	—	5–13	4–8
San Francisco	10–8	7–5	11–7	8–10	8–10	7–5	3–9	10–2	6–6	13–5	—	7–5
St. Louis	9–3	12–6	8–4	7–5	9–3	7–11	9–9	10–8	11–7	8–4	5–7	—

=== Notable transactions ===
- April 1, 1987: Graig Nettles was signed as a free agent with the Atlanta Braves.
- April 3, 1987: John Mizerock was signed as a free agent with the Atlanta Braves.
- May 5, 1987: Doyle Alexander was signed as a free agent by the Braves.
- June 2, 1987: Mike Stanton was drafted by the Braves in the 13th round of the 1987 Major League Baseball draft. Player signed June 10, 1987.
- July 25, 1987: Joe Boever was traded by the St. Louis Cardinals to the Atlanta Braves for Randy O'Neal.
- August 12, 1987: Doyle Alexander was traded by the Braves to the Detroit Tigers for John Smoltz.

=== Roster ===
1987 Atlanta Braves
Roster
Pitchers: 38 Jim Acker; 33 Doyle Alexander; 30 Paul Assenmacher; 37 Joe Boever; 36 Chuck Cary; 48 Marty Clary; 43 Kevin Coffman; 49 Jeff Dedmon; 26 Gene Garber; 47 Tom Glavine; 42 Rick Mahler; 25 Larry McWilliams; 35 Phil Niekro; 37 Randy O'Neal; 31 Ed Olwine; 46 David Palmer; 45 Charlie Puleo; 25 Pete Smith; 34 Zane Smith; 29 Steve Ziem	Catchers: 20 Bruce Benedict; 9 Ozzie Virgil; Infielders: 32 Jeff Blauser; 5 Ron Gant; 17 Glenn Hubbard; 19 Graig Nettles; 24 Ken Oberkfell; 28 Gerald Perry; 16 Rafael Ramírez; 12 Paul Runge; 23 Ted Simmons; 14 Andrés Thomas	Outfielders: 22 Ken Griffey; 1 Albert Hall; 10 Dion James; 6 Darryl Motley; 3 Dale Murphy; 15 Gary Roenicke; Other batters: 11 Terry Bell; 18 Trench Davis; 27 Mike Fischlin	Manager: 7 Chuck Tanner; Coaches: 50 Tony Bartirome; 39 Bruce Dal Canton; 52 Al Monchak; 2 Russ Nixon; 4 Bob Skinner; 8 Willie Stargell

== Player stats ==
=== Batting ===
==== Starters by position ====
Note: Pos = Position; G = Games played; AB = At bats; H = Hits; Avg.= Batting average; HR = Home runs; RBI = Runs batted in

Pos	Player	G	AB	H	Avg.	HR	RBI
C	Ozzie Virgil	123	429	106	.247	27	72
1B	Gerald Perry	142	533	144	.270	12	74
2B	Glenn Hubbard	141	443	117	.264	5	38
3B	Ken Oberkfell	135	508	142	.280	3	48
SS	Andrés Thomas	82	324	75	.231	5	39
LF	Ken Griffey	122	399	114	.286	14	64
CF	Dion James	134	494	154	.312	10	61
RF	Dale Murphy	159	566	167	.295	44	105

==== Other batters ====
Note: G = Games played; AB = At bats; H = Hits; Avg. = Batting average; HR = Home runs; RBI = Runs batted in

Player	G	AB	H	Avg.	HR	RBI
Albert Hall	92	292	83	.284	3	24
Rafael Ramírez	56	179	47	.263	1	21
Graig Nettles	112	177	37	.209	5	33
Ted Simmons	73	177	49	.277	4	30
Jeff Blauser	51	165	40	.242	2	15
Gary Roenicke	67	151	33	.219	9	28
Bruce Benedict	37	95	14	.147	1	5
Ron Gant	21	83	22	.265	2	9
Paul Runge	27	47	10	.213	3	8
Darryl Motley	6	8	0	.000	0	1
Trench Davis	6	3	0	.000	0	0
Terry Bell	1	1	0	.000	0	0
Mike Fischlin	1	0	0	----	0	0

==== Starting pitchers ====
Note: G = Games pitched; IP = Innings pitched; W = Wins; L = Losses; ERA = Earned run average; SO = Strikeouts

Player	G	IP	W	L	ERA	SO
Zane Smith	36	242.0	15	10	4.09	130
Rick Mahler	39	197.0	8	13	4.98	95
David Palmer	28	152.1	8	11	4.90	111
Doyle Alexander	16	117.2	5	10	4.13	64
Tom Glavine	9	50.1	2	4	5.54	20
Pete Smith	6	31.2	1	2	4.83	11
Kevin Coffman	5	25.1	2	3	4.62	14
Phil Niekro	1	3.0	0	0	15.00	0

==== Other pitchers ====
Note: G = Games pitched; IP = Innings pitched; W = Wins; L = Losses; ERA = Earned run average; SO = Strikeouts

Player	G	IP	W	L	ERA	SO
Charlie Puleo	35	123.1	6	8	4.23	99
Randy O'Neal	16	61.0	4	2	5.61	33
Larry McWilliams	9	20.1	0	1	5.75	13
Marty Clary	7	14.2	0	1	6.14	7

==== Relief pitchers ====
Note: G = Games pitched; W = Wins; L = Losses; SV = Saves; ERA = Earned run average; SO = Strikeouts

Player	G	W	L	SV	ERA	SO
Jim Acker	68	4	9	14	4.16	68
Gene Garber	49	8	10	10	4.41	48
Jeff Dedmon	53	3	4	4	3.91	40
Paul Assenmacher	52	1	1	2	5.10	39
Ed Olwine	27	0	1	1	5.01	12
Joe Boever	14	1	0	0	7.36	18
Chuck Cary	13	1	1	1	3.78	15
Steve Ziem	2	0	1	0	7.71	0

== Farm system ==
Level	Team	League	Manager
AAA	Richmond Braves	International League	Roy Majtyka
AA	Greenville Braves	Southern League	Jim Beauchamp
A	Durham Bulls	Carolina League	Brian Snitker
A	Sumter Braves	South Atlantic League	Buddy Bailey
Rookie	Pulaski Braves	Appalachian League	Grady Little
Rookie	GCL Braves	Gulf Coast League	Pedro González
Rookie	Idaho Falls Braves	Pioneer League	Rod Gilbreath
