= 1987 Chicago Cubs season =

1987 Chicago Cubs
- League: National League
- Division: East
- Ballpark: Wrigley Field
- City: Chicago
- Record: 76–85 (.472)
- Divisional place: 6th
- Owners: Tribune Company
- General managers: Dallas Green
- Managers: Gene Michael and Frank Lucchesi
- Television: WGN-TV/Superstation WGN (Harry Caray, Steve Stone, Dewayne Staats)
- Radio: WGN (Dewayne Staats, Lou Boudreau, Jim Frey, Harry Caray)
- Stats: ESPN.com; Baseball Reference

The 1987 Chicago Cubs season was the 116th season of the Chicago Cubs franchise, the 112th in the National League and the 72nd at Wrigley Field. The Cubs finished sixth and last in the National League East with a record of 76–85, 18½ games behind the division and pennant-winning St. Louis Cardinals.

== Offseason ==
=== Spring training ===
The team opened camp in Mesa, Arizona, apparently content with Brian Dayett to start in right field. However, Andre Dawson and his agent Dick Moss showed up after camp opened hoping that Green would consider signing the all-star outfielder. Dawson was one of the top free agents on the market during the off-season, but he garnered little interest. He made no secret that he wanted to leave Montreal, where his knees were battered by the Olympic Stadium Astroturf. He also made it known during the off season that the Cubs were his top choice, as Wrigley Field had a natural grass surface and had no lights. Dawson hit considerably better during the day.

After a couple weeks of Green saying he was flatly uninterested in Dawson, Dawson and Moss presented Green with a "blank" signed contract. Green filled in the amount – $500,000 for one year.

Spring training also began with the dark news of broadcaster Harry Caray suffering a stroke in Palm Springs. WGN announced that until Caray was well enough to return, guest announcers would fill in and sit alongside color analyst Steve Stone.

=== Notable transactions ===
- December 9, 1986: Heathcliff Slocumb was drafted by the Cubs from the New York Mets in the 1986 minor league draft.
- February 17, 1987: Guy Hoffman was traded by the Cubs to the Cincinnati Reds for Wade Rowdon.
- March 9, 1987: Andre Dawson was signed as a free agent by the Cubs.
- March 23, 1987: Mike Martin was released by the Cubs.
- March 30, 1987: Thad Bosley and Dave Gumpert were traded by the Cubs to the Kansas City Royals for Jim Sundberg.

== Regular season ==
The 1987 season featured a career year from free-agent acquisition Andre Dawson, who captured National League Most Valuable Player honors following a 49-home run season. It was also the rookie season for starting pitcher Greg Maddux, the final full season for Wrigley Field without lights, and the last year for general manager Dallas Green, who resigned in late October 1987.

=== Season summary ===
An 18–10 May propelled the Cubs into the race, and they spent time in first place in early June. However, injuries to Ryne Sandberg and Shawon Dunston within days of each other crippled the Cubs' middle infield and hampered their offense. Their replacements were Paul Noce and Mike Brumley, respectively, Brumley having been acquired as "thrown-in" in the 1984 Buckner-for-Eckersley trade. Neither player was able to come close to replacing the lost production from Sandberg and Dunston and, consequentially, the team struggled.

In the month of August, two incidents occurred in which players cheated against the Cubs. Phillies pitcher Kevin Gross was pitching against the Chicago Cubs on Aug 10, 1987. Gross was caught with sandpaper in his glove and suspended for 10 games. Astros batter Billy Hatcher was batting against the Chicago Cubs on Aug 31, 1987, when he broke his bat and it flew down the third base line. Cubs third baseman Keith Moreland saw cork, and Hatcher was suspended for 10 games. Later on, Hatcher claimed that he was using pitcher Dave Smith's bat, and not his own.

After a woeful August, Michael told the press that he was planning on resigning after the season. Green said that he would accept the resignation, effective immediately, and replaced Michael with Frank Lucchesi, a longtime scout in the Philadelphia organization who had become a Cubs roving instructor. As the Cubs played out the string under Lucchesi, they finished last, although they were a markedly improved team over the '86 club, with a promising future.

=== Season standings ===
NL East
Team	W	L	Pct.	GB	Home	Road
St. Louis Cardinals	95	67	.586	—	49‍–‍32	46‍–‍35
New York Mets	92	70	.568	3	49‍–‍32	43‍–‍38
Montreal Expos	91	71	.562	4	48‍–‍33	43‍–‍38
Philadelphia Phillies	80	82	.494	15	43‍–‍38	37‍–‍44
Pittsburgh Pirates	80	82	.494	15	47‍–‍34	33‍–‍48
Chicago Cubs	76	85	.472	18½	40‍–‍40	36‍–‍45

=== Record vs. opponents ===
1987 National League record Sources:
Team	ATL	CHC	CIN	HOU	LAD	MON	NYM	PHI	PIT	SD	SF	STL
Atlanta	—	6–5	8–10	8–10	6–12	3–9	7–5	7–5	7–5	6–12	8–10	3–9
Chicago	5–6	—	6–6	8–4	6–6	10–8	9–9	8–10	4–14	9–3	5–7	6–12
Cincinnati	10–8	6–6	—	13–5	10–8	6–6	7–5	5–7	4–8	12–6	7–11	4–8
Houston	10–8	4–8	5–13	—	12–6	7–5	6–6	6–6	6–6	5–13	10–8	5–7
Los Angeles	12–6	6–6	8–10	6–12	—	3–9	6–6	2–10	6–6	11–7	10–8	3–9
Montreal	9–3	8–10	6–6	5–7	9–3	—	8–10	10–8	11–7	9–3	5–7	11–7
New York	5–7	9–9	5–7	6–6	6–6	10–8	—	13–5	12–6	8–4	9–3	9–9
Philadelphia	5–7	10–8	7–5	6–6	10–2	8–10	5–13	—	11–7	8–4	2–10	8–10
Pittsburgh	5–7	14–4	8–4	6–6	6–6	7–11	6–12	7–11	—	8–4	6–6	7–11
San Diego	12–6	3–9	6–12	13–5	7–11	3–9	4–8	4–8	4–8	—	5–13	4–8
San Francisco	10–8	7–5	11–7	8–10	8–10	7–5	3–9	10–2	6–6	13–5	—	7–5
St. Louis	9–3	12–6	8–4	7–5	9–3	7–11	9–9	10–8	11–7	8–4	5–7	—

=== Notable transactions ===
- April 6, 1987: Dickie Noles was signed as a free agent by the Cubs.
- July 13, 1987: Steve Trout was traded by the Cubs to the New York Yankees for Bob Tewksbury, Rich Scheid, and Dean Wilkins.
- September 22, 1987: Dickie Noles was loaned by the Cubs to the Detroit Tigers.

=== Opening Day starters ===
- Jody Davis
- Andre Dawson
- Brian Dayett
- Bob Dernier
- Shawon Dunston
- Leon Durham
- Keith Moreland
- Ryne Sandberg
- Rick Sutcliffe

== Roster ==
1987 Chicago Cubs
Roster
Pitchers: 48 Jay Baller; 39 Ron Davis; 33 Frank DiPino; 44 Drew Hall; 50 Les Lancaster; 37 Ed Lynch; 31 Greg Maddux; 41 Mike Mason; 49 Jamie Moyer; 47 Dickie Noles; 21 Scott Sanderson; 46 Lee Smith; 40 Rick Sutcliffe; 42 Bob Tewksbury; 34 Steve Trout	Catchers: 34 Damon Berryhill; 7 Jody Davis; 11 Jim Sundberg; Infielders: 17 Mike Brumley; 12 Shawon Dunston; 10 Leon Durham; 6 Keith Moreland; 16 Paul Noce; 28 Luis Quiñones; 18 Wade Rowdon; 23 Ryne Sandberg; 19 Manny Trillo	Outfielders: 8 Andre Dawson; 24 Brian Dayett; 20 Bob Dernier; 30 Darrin Jackson; 1 Dave Martinez; 36 Gary Matthews; 22 Jerry Mumphrey; 25 Rafael Palmeiro; 29 Chico Walker	Manager: 53 Frank Lucchesi; 4 Gene Michael; Coaches: 9 Johnny Oates; 5 Jim Snyder; 3 Herm Starrette; 2 John Vukovich; 26 Billy Williams

=== Game log ===
1987 Chicago Cubs Game Log
April (10–10)

#	Date	Opponent	Score	Win	Loss	Save	Attendance	Record	Other Info
1	April 7	Cardinals	9–3	Tudor (1–0)	Sutcliffe (0–1)	Dawley (1)	38,240	0–1	
2	April 9	Cardinals	4–2	Cox (1–0)	Trout (0–1)	Worrell (1)	12,441	0–2	
3	April 10	@ Phillies	4–3	Lynch (1–0)	K. Gross (0–1)	Noles (1)	43,212	1–2	
4	April 11	@ Phillies	9–1	Sutcliffe (1–1)	Cowley (0–1)		21,581	2–2	
5	April 12	@ Phillies	9 – 8 (10)	Bedrosian (1–0)	Smith (0–1)		23,769	2–3	
6	April 13	@ Phillies	5–2	Moyer (1–0)	Carman (0–1)	Smith (1)	15,366	3–3	
7	April 15	Pirates	3 – 1 (10)	D. Robinson (2–0)	Noles (0–1)		5,369	3–4	Pat Summerall broadcasts.
8	April 16	Pirates	6–0	Kipper (1–1)	Lynch (1–1)		6,956	3–5	
9	April 17	Expos	7–0	Sutcliffe (2–1)	Youmans (0–2)		23,023	4–5	Bill Murray announces the game on WGN-TV
10	April 18	Expos	4–2	Sebra (1–1)	Maddux (0–1)	St. Claire (2)	32,613	4–6	
11	April 19	Expos	3–1	Sorensen (1–0)	Moyer (1–1)	McGaffigan (1)	19,889	4–7	
12	April 21	@ Cardinals	5–4	Noles (1–1)	Dawley (0–1)	Smith (2)	26,333	5–7	
13	April 22	@ Cardinals	5–4	Sutcliffe (3–1)	Dawley (0–2)	Smith (3)	23,784	6–7	
14	April 23	@ Cardinals	5–2	Cox (3–0)	Maddux (0–2)		29,347	6–8	
15	April 24	@ Expos	6–4	Moyer (2–1)	Sebra (1–2)	Smith (4)	7,752	7–8	
16	April 25	@ Expos	9–4	Sanderson (1–0)	Tibbs (1–3)		11,824	8–8	
17	April 26	@ Expos	7–1	Trout (1–1)	Sorensen (1–1)		12,052	9–8	
18	April 28	Giants	6–2	Krukow (1–3)	Sutcliffe (3–2)		10,097	9–9	
19	April 29	Giants	8–4	Maddux (1–2)	Mason (1–1)	Lynch (1)	11,120	10–9	Dawson hits for cycle
20	April 30	Giants	5–4	Garrelts (3–2)	Smith (0–2)	Minton (1)	11,934	10–10	

May (18–10)

#	Date	Opponent	Score	Win	Loss	Save	Attendance	Record	Other Info
21	May 1	Padres	7–5	DiPino (1–0)	McCullers (2–3)	Smith (5)	16,100	11–10	
22	May 2	Padres	7–3	Trout (2–1)	Whitson (3–3)	Lynch (2)	25,428	12–10	
23	May 3	Padres	4–2	Sutcliffe (4–2)	Hawkins (0–3)	Smith (6)	27,202	13–10	
24	May 4	Dodgers	5–4	Noles (2–1)	Howell (2–1)		17,487	14–10	
25	May 5	Dodgers	3–1	Welch (4–1)	Moyer (2–2)		18,021	14–11	
26	May 6	@ Giants	9–4	Sanderson (2–0)	M. Davis (3–2)	Smith (7)	15,123	15–11	
27	May 7	@ Giants	11–1	LaCoss (3–1)	Lynch (1–2)	J. Robinson (6)	12,228	15–12	
28	May 8	@ Padres	6–3	Sutcliffe (5–2)	S. Davis (1–5)	Smith (8)	46,533	16–12	
29	May 9	@ Padres	5–2	Maddux (2–2)	Show (1–3)	Smith (9)	19,088	17–12	
30	May 10	@ Padres	14–2	Whitson (4–4)	Moyer (2–3)	Booker (1)	14,682	17–13	
31	May 11	@ Dodgers	6–3	Sanderson (3–0)	Hershiser (3–4)	Smith (10)	35,819	18–13	
32	May 12	@ Dodgers	7–0	Honeycutt (2–1)	Lynch (1–3)		41,216	18–14	
33	May 13	@ Dodgers	5–0	Sutcliffe (6–2)	Pena (0–3)		39,294	19–14	
34	May 15	@ Astros	3–1	Maddux (3–2)	Darwin (2–3)	Smith (11)	23,471	20–14	
35	May 16	@ Astros	2–1	Moyer (3–3)	Ryan (2–3)	DiPino (1)	34,921	21–14	
36	May 17	@ Astros	6–4	Mason (1–0)	Knepper (2–3)	Smith (12)	20,678	22–14	
37	May 19	Reds	9–2	Sutcliffe (7–2)	Browning (4–5)	Lynch (3)	28,890	23–14	Harry Caray returns from stroke
38	May 20	Reds	6–2	Gullickson (5–2)	Maddux (3–3)		27,150	23–15	
39	May 21	Reds	8–7	Smith (1–2)	Franco (1–1)		21,718	24–15	
40	May 22	Braves	9–5	Palmer (4–4)	Sanderson (3–1)	Acker (4)	28,667	24–16	
41	May 23	Braves	7 – 6 (16)	Moyer (4–3)	Acker (0–3)		33,225	25–16	Dawson homers with 2 outs in 9th to tie
42	May 24	Braves	3 – 2 (12)	Noles (3–1)	Dedmon (2–1)		37,259	26–16	
43	May 25	@ Reds	5–4	Gullickson (6–2)	Maddux (3–4)	Franco (8)	24,684	26–17	
44	May 26	@ Reds	3–2	Franco (2–1)	Smith (1–3)		21,388	26–18	
45	May 27	@ Reds	4–1	Moyer (5–3)	Reuss (0–3)	Smith (13)	23,304	27–18	
46	May 29	@ Braves	6 – 5 (12)	Garber (6–3)	Lynch (1–4)		21,982	27–19	
47	May 30	@ Braves	11–6	Maddux (4–4)	Z. Smith (5–3)	Noles (2)	35,394	28–19	
48	May 31	@ Braves	2 – 1 (10)	Garber (7–3)	Lynch (1–5)		24,353	28–20	

June (12–17)

#	Date	Opponent	Score	Win	Loss	Save	Attendance	Record	Other Info
49	June 1	Astros	6 – 5 (10)	Andersen (4–2)	DiPino (1–1)	Smith (9)	14,556	28–21	
50	June 2	Astros	13–2	Mason (2–0)	Ryan (2–5)		13,891	29–21	
51	June 3	Astros	22–7	Sutcliffe (8–2)	Knepper (2–6)		19,725	30–21	
52	June 4	Cardinals	3–1	Cox (6–2)	Maddux (4–5)	Worrell (12)	32,102	30–22	
53	June 5	Cardinals	5–1	Mathews (3–4)	Sanderson (3–2)		36,818	30–23	
54	June 6	Cardinals	6–5	Moyer (6–3)	Forsch (4–2)	Smith (14)	39,008	31–23	
55	June 7	Cardinals	13–9	Dawley (2–4)	Mason (2–1)	Worrell (13)	38,388	31–24	
56	June 8	Mets	4–2	Smith (2–3)	Sisk (1–1)		28,063	32–24	
57	June 9	Mets	6–5	Noles (4–1)	Myers (0–2)	Smith (15)	31,252	33–24	
58	June 10	Mets	13–2	Gooden (2–0)	Sanderson (3–3)		35,190	33–25	
59	June 12	@ Cardinals	4–1	Forsch (5–2)	Moyer (6–4)	Worrell (15)	48,096	33–26	
60	June 13	@ Cardinals	9–2	Tunnell (3–1)	Sutcliffe (8–3)		47,395	33–27	
61	June 14	@ Cardinals	3–2	Cox (7–3)	Sanderson (3–4)	Worrell (16)	46,106	33–28	
62	June 15	Phillies	3–2	Tekulve (2–2)	Smith (2–4)	Bedrosian (16)	18,643	33–29	
63	June 16	Phillies	7–2	Trout (3–1)	K. Gross (4–6)	Smith (16)	30,007	34–29	
64	June 17	Phillies	5–3	Moyer (7–4)	Rawley (7–4)	Smith (17)	26,447	35–29	
65	June 18	Phillies	9–7	Sutcliffe (9–3)	M. Jackson (1–5)	Smith (18)	22,870	36–29	
66	June 19	Pirates	4–0	Fisher (3–4)	Noles (4–2)		33,529	36–30	
67	June 20	Pirates	8–2	Dunne (3–1)	Maddux (4–6)		34,384	36–31	
68	June 21	Pirates	6–3	Trout (4–1)	Drabek (1–6)	Smith (19)	33,418	37–31	
69	June 22	Pirates	3–2	Moyer (8–4)	Reuschel (5–4)		27,064	38–31	
70	June 23	@ Mets	4–1	Sutcliffe (10–3)	Darling (2–5)	Smith (20)	39,789	39–31	
71	June 24	@ Mets	2–1	McDowell (4–2)	Smith (2–5)		42,196	39–32	
72	June 25	@ Mets	8–2	Gooden (4–1)	Trout (4–2)		40,167	39–33	
73	June 26	@ Pirates	5–2	Jones (1–1)	Maddux (4–7)	D. Robinson (10)	20,408	39–34	
74	June 27	@ Pirates	7–0	Reuschel (6–4)	Moyer (8–5)		31,595	39–35	
75	June 28	@ Pirates	6–2	Jones (2–1)	Sutcliffe (10–4)		25,304	39–36	
76	June 29	@ Expos	9–5	Lancaster (1–0)	Sorensen (3–4)	Lynch (4)	15,117	40–36	
77	June 30	@ Expos	5–4	Martinez (3–0)	Trout (4–3)	Parrett (2)	13,777	40–37	

July (12–13)

#	Date	Opponent	Score	Win	Loss	Save	Attendance	Record	Other Info
78	July 1	@ Expos	1–0	Maddux (5–7)	Sebra (4–9)		15,740	41–37	
79	July 3	Giants	3–1	Downs (7–4)	Moyer (8–6)	J. Robinson (9)	37,650	41–38	
80	July 4	Giants	5–3	Sutcliffe (11–4)	Hammaker (4–6)	Smith (21)	30,929	42–38	
81	July 5	Giants	7–5	Price (1–0)	Lynch (1–6)	Garrelts (10)	32,304	42–39	
82	July 6	Padres	7–0	Trout (5–3)	Grant (1–3)		20,508	43–39	
83	July 7	Padres	7–5	Sanderson (4–4)	Show (4–10)	Smith (22)	26,615	44–39	Show beans Dawson
84	July 8	Padres	12–8	Lancaster (2–0)	McCullers (4–6)		31,278	45–39	
85	July 9	Dodgers	12–5	Sutcliffe (12–4)	Honeycutt (2–9)	Sanderson (1)	33,606	46–39	
86	July 10	Dodgers	5 – 4 (10)	Young (4–5)	Smith (2–6)		36,003	46–40	
87	July 11	Dodgers	7–0	Trout (6–3)	Leary (1–5)		37,045	47–40	
88	July 12	Dodgers	12–0	Welch (9–5)	Lancaster (2–1)		35,895	47–41	
89	July 16	@ Giants	4–1	Moyer (9–6)	Dravecky (4–8)	Sanderson (2)	14,024	48–41	
90	July 17	@ Giants	5–1	Sutcliffe (13–4)	Downs (8–5)	Smith (23)	13,868	49–41	
91	July 18	@ Giants	9–2	Hammaker (5–7)	Maddux (5–8)		26,504	49–42	
92	July 19	@ Giants	4–3	Garrelts (7–6)	Sanderson (4–5)		35,865	49–43	
93	July 20	@ Padres	7–4	McCullers (6–6)	Tewksbury (0–1)	M. Davis (2)	15,113	49–44	
94	July 21	@ Padres	4–3	M. Davis (5–5)	Moyer (9–7)		17,305	49–45	
95	July 22	@ Padres	6–3	Sutcliffe (14–4)	Grant (2–5)		18,614	50–45	
96	July 24	@ Dodgers	6–4	Maddux (6–8)	Leary (1–6)	Smith (24)	38,052	51–45	
97	July 25	@ Dodgers	7–2	Howell (3–3)	Tewksbury (0–2)	Pena (2)	32,143	51–46	
98	July 26	@ Dodgers	7–6	Holton (3–1)	DiPino (1–2)	Young (8)	40,523	51–47	
99	July 28	Expos	8–3	Sutcliffe (15–4)	McGaffigan (2–2)	Smith (25)	35,299	52–47	
100	July 29	Expos	11–3	Smith (7–4)	Maddux (6–9)		37,019	52–48	
101	July 30	Expos	6–1	Heaton (12–4)	Tewksbury (0–3)		28,128	52–49	
102	July 31	Phillies	8–5	Tekulve (5–3)	Sanderson (4–6)	Bedrosian (30)	32,930	52–50	

August (14–14)

#	Date	Opponent	Score	Win	Loss	Save	Attendance	Record	Other Info
103	August 1	Phillies	5–3	Lancaster (3–1)	Hume (1–3)	Smith (26)	33,002	53–50	Dawson hits three home runs
104	August 2	Phillies	3 – 2 (10)	Smith (3–6)	Calhoun (0–1)		33,629	54–50	
105	August 3	@ Pirates	6–4	Drabek (3–10)	Maddux (6–10)	Gott (1)	7,281	54–51	
106	August 4	@ Pirates	3 – 2 (11)	Mason (3–1)	Gideon (1–2)		8,744	55–51	
107	August 5	@ Pirates	10–0	Fisher (7–6)	Moyer (9–8)		7,726	55–52	
108	August 6	@ Mets	7–6	McDowell (7–3)	Smith (3–7)		37,584	55–53	
109	August 7	@ Mets	7–1	Darling (8–7)	Sutcliffe (15–5)		43,440	55–54	
110	August 8	@ Mets	5–3	Mason (4–1)	Schulze (1–2)	Smith (27)	47,893	56–54	
111	August 9	@ Mets	6–3	Sanderson (5–6)	Gooden (9–4)	Smith (28)	49,031	57–54	
112	August 10	@ Phillies	4–2	Frohwirth (1–0)	Moyer (9–9)	Bedrosian (31)	26,796	57–55	
113	August 11	@ Phillies	9 – 8 (13)	K. Gross (7–10)	Tewksbury (0–4)		30,459	57–56	
114	August 12	@ Phillies	13–7	Calhoun (1–1)	Lynch (1–7)		36,190	57–57	
115	August 13	Mets	7–5	DiPino (2–2)	McDowell (7–4)	Smith (29)	35,033	58–57	
116	August 14	Mets	6–1	Sanderson (6–6)	Mitchell (3–5)		17,811	59–57	
117	August 15	Mets	7–3	Moyer (10–9)	Leach (10–1)	DiPino (2)	32,425	60–57	
118	August 16	Mets	23–10	Darling (10–7)	Maddux (6–11)		32,731	60–58	Billy Williams day ruined by football score
119	August 18	@ Braves	9–5	Mahler (7–12)	Lynch (1–8)	Acker (8)	17,469	60–59	
120	August 19	@ Braves	9–1	Sanderson (7–6)	Puleo (5–6)		10,523	61–59	
121	August 20	@ Braves	13–4	Acker (1–5)	Moyer (10–10)		11,647	61–60	
122	August 21	Astros	7–5	DiPino (3–2)	Deshaies (10–5)	Smith (30)	31,006	62–60	
123	August 22	Astros	5 – 4 (11)	Andersen (8–4)	DiPino (3–3)	Smith (21)	32,552	62–61	
124	August 23	Astros	4–2	Heathcock (3–1)	Sutcliffe (15–6)	Smith (22)	33,934	62–62	
125	August 27	Braves	5–2	Z. Smith (14–7)	Moyer (10–11)			62–63	
126	August 27	Braves	8 – 6 (8)	Lancaster (4–1)	Mahler (7–13)	DiPino (3)	19,006	63–63	
127	August 28	@ Reds	6 – 5 (10)	Smith (4–7)	Franco (7–5)		28,223	64–63	
128	August 29	@ Reds	4–1	Browning (6–11)	Sanderson (7–7)		37,783	64–64	
129	August 30	@ Reds	3–1	Lynch (2–8)	Rasmussen (0–1)	Smith (31)	33,485	65–64	
130	August 31	@ Astros	4–3	Lancaster (5–1)	Darwin (8–9)	Smith (32)	17,734	66–64	

September (9–18)

#	Date	Opponent	Score	Win	Loss	Save	Attendance	Record	Other Info
131	September 1	@ Astros	3–2	Moyer (11–11)	Hernandez (0–1)	Smith (33)	14,026	67–64	
132	September 2	@ Astros	10–1	Scott (14–10)	Sutcliffe (15–7)		17,406	67–65	
133	September 4	Reds	4–3	Williams (4–0)	Smith (4–8)	Franco (26)	19,715	67–66	
134	September 5	Reds	10–5	Rasmussen (1–1)	Lynch (2–9)		33,336	67–67	
135	September 6	Reds	3–1	Lancaster (6–1)	Power (10–10)	Smith (34)	33,093	68–67	
136	September 7	Pirates	3–2	Fisher (8–9)	Moyer (11–12)	J. Robinson (11)	21,745	68–68	
137	September 8	Pirates	4–1	Palacios (1–0)	Sutcliffe (15–8)	Gott (8)	8,331	68–69	
138	September 9	Pirates	4–3	J. Robinson (8–8)	Smith (4–9)	Gott (9)	8,054	68–70	
139	September 11	Expos	8–4	Lancaster (7–1)	Youmans (9–8)		10,174	69–70	
140	September 12	Expos	7–1	Perez (3–0)	Moyer (11–13)		25,681	69–71	
141	September 13	Expos	5–2	Sutcliffe (16–8)	Smith (9–7)		25,444	70–71	
142	September 14	@ Mets	6–5	Aguilera (9–2)	Hall (0–1)	Orosco (15)	27,693	70–72	
143	September 15	@ Mets	12–4	Fernandez (11–8)	Maddux (6–12)		31,806	70–73	
144	September 16	@ Phillies	8–5	Maddux (2–0)	Smith (4–10)	Bedrosian (37)	17,598	70–74	
145	September 17	@ Phillies	4–3	Carman (11–10)	Moyer (11–14)	Bedrosian (38)	10,338	70–75	
146	September 18	@ Cardinals	8–1	Sutcliffe (17–8)	Cox (9–8)		44,189	71–75	
147	September 19	@ Cardinals	5–3	Magrane (8–7)	Sanderson (7–8)	Worrell (30)	48,387	71–76	
148	September 20	@ Cardinals	10–2	Forsch (11–5)	Maddux (6–13)		44,894	71–77	
149	September 21	Mets	7–1	Gooden (15–6)	Lancaster (7–2)		8,229	71–78	
150	September 22	Mets	6–2	Sutcliffe (18–8)	Cone (5–5)		11,672	72–78	
151	September 23	Phillies	5–0	Ruffin (11–14)	Moyer (11–15)		7,160	72–79	
152	September 24	Phillies	3 – 2 (11)	Bedrosian (5–2)	Baller (0–1)		6,904	72–80	
153	September 25	Cardinals	2–1	Sanderson (8–8)	Forsch (11–6)	DiPino (4)	21,561	73–80	
154	September 26	Cardinals	5–3	Tudor (9–2)	Sutcliffe (18–9)	Dayley (4)	35,669	73–81	
155	September 27	Cardinals	7–3	Lancaster (8–2)	Cox (10–9)	Smith (35)	33,912	74–81	
156	September 30	@ Pirates	5–3	Fisher (11–9)	Sutcliffe (18–10)	J. Robinson (13)		74–82	
157	September 30	@ Pirates	10–8	Hall (1–1)	Smiley (5–5)		6,985	75–82	

October (1–3)

#	Date	Opponent	Score	Win	Loss	Save	Attendance	Record	Other Info
158	October 1	@ Pirates	12–3	Drabek (11–12)	Sanderson (8–9)		5,294	75–83	
159	October 2	@ Expos	7–1	Heaton (13–10)	Maddux (6–14)	McGaffigan (12)	13,301	75–84	
160	October 3	@ Expos	5–4	Parrett (7–5)	Lancaster (8–3)	Burke (18)	15,517	75–85	
161	October 4	@ Expos	7–5	Moyer (12–15)	Parrett (7–6)	Smith (36)	29,487	76–85	

== Player stats ==
=== Batting ===
==== Starters by position ====
Note: Pos = Position; G = Games played; AB = At bats; H = Hits; Avg. = Batting average; HR = Home runs; RBI = Runs batted in

Pos	Player	G	AB	H	Avg.	HR	RBI
C	Jody Davis	125	428	106	.248	19	51
1B	Leon Durham	131	439	120	.273	27	63
2B	Ryne Sandberg	132	523	154	.294	16	59
3B	Keith Moreland	153	563	150	.266	27	88
SS	Shawon Dunston	95	346	85	.246	5	22
LF	Jerry Mumphrey	118	309	103	.333	13	44
CF	Dave Martinez	142	459	134	.292	8	36
RF	Andre Dawson	153	621	178	.287	49	137

==== Other batters ====
Note: G = Games played; AB = At bats; H = Hits; Avg. = Batting average; HR = Home runs; RBI = Runs batted in

Player	G	AB	H	Avg.	HR	RBI
Rafael Palmeiro	84	221	61	.276	14	30
Manny Trillo	108	214	63	.294	8	26
Bob Dernier	93	199	63	.317	8	21
Paul Noce	70	180	41	.228	3	14
Brian Dayett	97	177	49	.277	5	25
Jim Sundberg	61	139	28	.201	4	15
Chico Walker	47	105	21	.200	0	7
Mike Brumley	39	104	21	.202	1	9
Luis Quiñones	49	101	22	.218	0	8
Gary Matthews	44	42	11	.262	0	8
Wade Rowdon	11	31	7	.226	1	4
Damon Berryhill	12	28	5	.179	0	1
Darrin Jackson	7	5	4	.800	0	0

=== Pitching ===
==== Starting pitchers ====
Note: G = Games pitched; IP = Innings pitched; W = Wins; L = Losses; ERA = Earned run average; SO = Strikeouts

Player	G	IP	W	L	ERA	SO
Rick Sutcliffe	34	237.1	18	10	3.68	174
Jamie Moyer	35	201.0	12	15	5.10	147
Greg Maddux	30	156.0	6	14	5.61	101
Steve Trout	11	75.0	6	3	3.00	32

==== Other pitchers ====
Note: G = Games pitched; IP = Innings pitched; W = Wins; L = Losses; ERA = Earned run average; SO = Strikeouts

Player	G	IP	W	L	ERA	SO
Scott Sanderson	32	144.2	8	9	4.29	106
Les Lancaster	27	132.1	8	3	4.90	78
Mike Mason	17	38.0	4	1	5.68	28
Bob Tewksbury	7	18.0	0	4	6.50	10

==== Relief pitchers ====
Note: G = Games pitched; W = Wins; L = Losses; SV = Saves; ERA = Earned run average; SO = Strikeouts

Player	G	W	L	SV	ERA	SO
Lee Smith	62	4	10	36	3.12	96
Frank DiPino	69	3	3	4	3.15	61
Ed Lynch	58	2	9	4	5.38	80
Dickie Noles	41	4	2	2	3.50	33
Jay Baller	23	0	1	0	6.75	27
Drew Hall	21	1	1	0	6.89	20
Ron Davis	21	0	0	0	5.85	31

== Awards and honors ==
- Andre Dawson – National League Most Valuable Player
- Andre Dawson – National League Leader Home Runs (49)
- Andre Dawson – National League Leader RBI (137)
- Andre Dawson, Outfield, Gold Glove Award
- Andre Dawson, Outfield, Silver Slugger Award
- Ryne Sandberg, Second Baseman, Gold Glove Award
- Rick Sutcliffe, Pitcher, Lou Gehrig Award
- Rick Sutcliffe, Roberto Clemente Award

All-Star Game

== Farm system ==
Level	Team	League	Manager
AAA	Iowa Cubs	American Association	Larry Cox
AA	Pittsfield Cubs	Eastern League	Jim Essian
A	Winston-Salem Spirits	Carolina League	Jay Loviglio
A	Peoria Chiefs	Midwest League	Jim Tracy
A-Short Season	Geneva Cubs	New York–Penn League	Tom Spencer
Rookie	Wytheville Cubs	Appalachian League	Brad Mills
