= 1987 Cincinnati Reds season =

1987 Cincinnati Reds
- League: National League
- Division: West
- Ballpark: Riverfront Stadium
- City: Cincinnati
- Record: 84–78 (.519)
- Divisional place: 2nd
- Owners: Marge Schott
- General managers: Bill Bergesch, Murray Cook
- Managers: Pete Rose
- Television: WLWT (Marty Brennaman, Joe Nuxhall, Johnny Bench)
- Radio: WLW (Marty Brennaman, Joe Nuxhall, Andy MacWilliams)

The 1987 Cincinnati Reds season was the 118th season for the franchise in Major League Baseball, and their 18th and 17th full season at Riverfront Stadium. It resulted in another winning season for the Cincinnati Reds in the National League West. They failed, however, to overcome the Giants and finished in second place for a third consecutive year with a record of 84–78.

Of special note: centerfielder Eric Davis amassed 50 stolen bases in addition to hitting 37 home runs, becoming the first major league player to achieve 30 homers and 50 stolen bases in the same season.

== Offseason ==
- November 11, 1986: Chris Welsh was released by the Cincinnati Reds.
- February 17, 1987: Wade Rowdon was traded by the Reds to the Chicago Cubs for Guy Hoffman.
- March 20, 1987: Derek Botelho was traded by the Cincinnati Reds to the Kansas City Royals for Eddie Tanner (minors) and Pete Carey (minors).
- March 23, 1987: Terry Francona was signed as a free agent by the Reds.
- March 29, 1987: Max Venable was released by the Reds.

== Regular season ==
=== Season standings ===
NL West
Team	W	L	Pct.	GB	Home	Road
San Francisco Giants	90	72	.556	—	46‍–‍35	44‍–‍37
Cincinnati Reds	84	78	.519	6	42‍–‍39	42‍–‍39
Houston Astros	76	86	.469	14	47‍–‍34	29‍–‍52
Los Angeles Dodgers	73	89	.451	17	40‍–‍41	33‍–‍48
Atlanta Braves	69	92	.429	20½	42‍–‍39	27‍–‍53
San Diego Padres	65	97	.401	25	37‍–‍44	28‍–‍53

=== Record vs. opponents ===
1987 National League record Sources:
Team	ATL	CHC	CIN	HOU	LAD	MON	NYM	PHI	PIT	SD	SF	STL
Atlanta	—	6–5	8–10	8–10	6–12	3–9	7–5	7–5	7–5	6–12	8–10	3–9
Chicago	5–6	—	6–6	8–4	6–6	10–8	9–9	8–10	4–14	9–3	5–7	6–12
Cincinnati	10–8	6–6	—	13–5	10–8	6–6	7–5	5–7	4–8	12–6	7–11	4–8
Houston	10–8	4–8	5–13	—	12–6	7–5	6–6	6–6	6–6	5–13	10–8	5–7
Los Angeles	12–6	6–6	8–10	6–12	—	3–9	6–6	2–10	6–6	11–7	10–8	3–9
Montreal	9–3	8–10	6–6	5–7	9–3	—	8–10	10–8	11–7	9–3	5–7	11–7
New York	5–7	9–9	5–7	6–6	6–6	10–8	—	13–5	12–6	8–4	9–3	9–9
Philadelphia	5–7	10–8	7–5	6–6	10–2	8–10	5–13	—	11–7	8–4	2–10	8–10
Pittsburgh	5–7	14–4	8–4	6–6	6–6	7–11	6–12	7–11	—	8–4	6–6	7–11
San Diego	12–6	3–9	6–12	13–5	7–11	3–9	4–8	4–8	4–8	—	5–13	4–8
San Francisco	10–8	7–5	11–7	8–10	8–10	7–5	3–9	10–2	6–6	13–5	—	7–5
St. Louis	9–3	12–6	8–4	7–5	9–3	7–11	9–9	10–8	11–7	8–4	5–7	—

=== Transactions ===
- April 9, 1987: Max Venable was signed as a free agent by the Reds.
- May 19, 1987: Sal Butera was released by the Reds.
- June 2, 1987: Butch Henry was drafted by the Cincinnati Reds in the 15th round of the 1987 amateur draft. Player signed June 30, 1987.
- August 26, 1987: Bill Gullickson was traded by the Reds to the New York Yankees for Dennis Rasmussen.

=== Roster ===
1987 Cincinnati Reds
Roster
Pitchers: 32 Tom Browning; 31 John Franco; 34 Bill Gullickson; 30 Guy Hoffman; 41 Tom Hume; 43 Bill Landrum; 40 Jeff Montgomery; 46 Rob Murphy; 35 Pat Pacillo; 38 Pat Perry; 48 Ted Power; 45 Dennis Rasmussen; 41 Jerry Reuss; 33 Ron Robinson; 34 Bill Scherrer; 36 Mario Soto; 47 Frank Williams	Catchers: 22 Sal Butera; 6 Bo Díaz; 23 Lloyd McClendon; 8 Terry McGriff; Infielders: 25 Buddy Bell; 13 Dave Concepción; 12 Nick Esasky; 10 Terry Francona; 15 Barry Larkin; 16 Ron Oester; 11 Kurt Stillwell; 58 Jeff Treadway	Outfielders: 22 Dave Collins; 28 Kal Daniels; 44 Eric Davis; 26 Leo Garcia; 29 Tracy Jones; 21 Paul O'Neill; 39 Dave Parker; 9 Max Venable	Manager: 14 Pete Rose; Coaches: 2 Scott Breeden (Pitching); 7 Billy DeMars (First Base); 19 Tommy Helms; 4 Bruce Kimm (Third Base); 3 Jim Lett (Bench); 24 Tony Pérez (Hitting)

== Player stats ==
=== Batting ===
==== Starters by position ====
Note: Pos = Position; G = Games played; AB = At bats; H = Hits; Avg. = Batting average; HR = Home runs; RBI = Runs batted in

Pos	Player	G	AB	H	Avg.	HR	RBI
C	Bo Díaz	140	496	134	.270	15	82
1B	Nick Esasky	100	346	94	.272	22	59
2B	Ron Oester	69	237	60	.253	2	23
3B	Buddy Bell	143	522	148	.284	17	70
SS	Barry Larkin	125	439	107	.244	12	43
LF	Kal Daniels	108	368	123	.334	26	64
CF	Eric Davis	129	474	139	.293	37	100
RF	Dave Parker	153	589	149	.253	26	97

==== Other batters ====
Note: G = Games played; AB = At bats; H = Hits; Avg. = Batting average; HR = Home runs; RBI = Runs batted in

Player	G	AB	H	Avg.	HR	RBI
Kurt Stillwell	131	395	102	.258	4	33
Tracy Jones	117	359	104	.290	10	44
Dave Concepción	104	279	89	.319	1	33
Terry Francona	102	207	47	.227	3	12
Paul O'Neill	84	160	41	.256	7	28
Terry McGriff	34	89	20	.225	2	11
Dave Collins	57	85	25	.294	0	5
Jeff Treadway	23	84	28	.333	2	4
Lloyd McClendon	45	72	15	.208	2	13
Leo García	31	30	6	.200	1	2
Sal Butera	5	11	2	.182	1	2
Max Venable	7	7	1	.143	0	2

=== Pitching ===
==== Starting pitchers ====
Note: G = Games pitched; IP = Innings pitched; W = Wins; L = Losses; ERA = Earned run average; SO = Strikeouts

Player	G	IP	W	L	ERA	SO
Ted Power	34	204.0	10	13	4.50	133
Tom Browning	32	183.0	10	13	5.02	117
Bill Gullickson	27	165.0	10	11	4.85	89
Dennis Rasmussen	7	45.1	4	1	3.97	39
Jerry Reuss	7	34.2	0	5	7.79	10
Mario Soto	6	31.2	3	2	5.12	11

==== Other pitchers ====
Note: G = Games pitched; IP = Innings pitched; W = Wins; L = Losses; ERA = Earned run average; SO = Strikeouts

Player	G	IP	W	L	ERA	SO
Guy Hoffman	36	158.2	9	10	4.37	87
Ron Robinson	48	154.0	7	5	3.68	99
Pat Pacillo	12	39.2	3	3	6.13	23

==== Relief pitchers ====
Note: G = Games pitched; W = Wins; L = Losses; SV = Saves; ERA = Earned run average; SO = Strikeouts

Player	G	W	L	SV	ERA	SO
John Franco	68	8	5	32	2.52	61
Rob Murphy	87	8	5	3	3.04	99
Frank Williams	85	4	0	2	2.30	60
Bill Landrum	44	3	2	2	4.71	42
Bill Scherrer	23	1	1	0	4.36	24
Jeff Montgomery	14	2	2	0	6.52	13
Pat Perry	12	1	0	1	0.00	6
Tom Hume	11	1	0	0	4.05	4
Paul O'Neill	1	0	0	0	13.50	2

== Farm system ==
Level	Team	League	Manager
AAA	Nashville Sounds	American Association	Jack Lind
AA	Vermont Reds	Eastern League	Tom Runnells
A	Tampa Tarpons	Florida State League	Marc Bombard
A	Cedar Rapids Reds	Midwest League	Paul Kirsch
Rookie	GCL Reds	Gulf Coast League	Sam Mejías
Rookie	Billings Mustangs	Pioneer League	Dave Keller
