= Randy Byers =

American baseball player (born 1964)

- Left fielder
- Born: October 2, 1964 (age 61); Bridgeton, New Jersey, U.S.
- Batted: Left Threw: Right

MLB debut
- September 7, 1987, for the San Diego Padres

Last MLB appearance
- May 21, 1988, for the San Diego Padres

MLB statistics
- Batting average: .269
- Hits: 7
- Stolen bases: 1
- Stats at Baseball Reference

Teams
- San Diego Padres (1987–1988)

Randell Parker Byers (born October 2, 1964) is an American former Major League Baseball left fielder who played for two seasons. He played for the San Diego Padres for ten games during the 1987 San Diego Padres season and 11 games during the 1988 San Diego Padres season.

Born in Bridgeton, New Jersey, Byers played prep baseball at Cumberland Regional High School.
