= Jessie Reed =

Ziegfeld Girl (1897–1940)

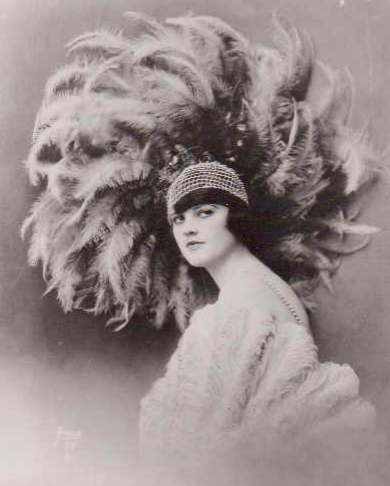
- Ziegfeld Follies Promotional Photo
- Born: July 3, 1897
- Died: September 18, 1940 (aged 43)
- Occupations: Model, showgirl
- Writing career
- Years active: 1917-1924

Jessie Reed was an early 20th-century American model and showgirl. She gained fame as the highest-paid showgirl at the Ziegfeld Follies in the 1920s. Most accounts give her birth date as July 3, 1897, although she gave the year as 1898 on some records.

== Early years ==
Jessie Reed's exact roots remain unclear. Even her original name is something of a mystery. Her first marriage certificate in 1912 lists her name as Jessie May Richardson, but a year later, on her daughter's birth certificate, she is listed as Jessie M. Richards, which, based on her death certificate where her father's name is given as Jessie Richard, suggests Richards was most likely her correct name. Contemporary sources routinely reported that Jessie Reed was born in Texas, in or near Houston. Her death certificate, however, gives her birthplace as San Antonio. At the same time, her entry in the 1940 U.S. Census shows her as having been born in Alabama.

== Theatrical career ==
Reed first gained attention in show business when she appeared in the Shubert production "The Passing Show of 1917" in New York City and later "The Passing Show of 1918." She was a showgirl at the Winter Garden in the Sigmund Romberg musical "Sinbad," starring Al Jolson. Florenz Ziegfeld then hired her away for his "Midnight Frolic" at the rooftop garden at the New Amsterdam Theatre. The entertainments there included W.C. Fields and Fanny Brice, as well as Will Rogers and Eddie Cantor. In the summer of 1919, Jessie Reed appeared in the Ziegfeld Follies, performing alongside Bert Williams, and was cast as "Barcarolle" in the signature production number "A Pretty Girl is Like a Melody." Reed became a favorite model of photographers Alfred Cheney Johnson and Edward Thayer Monroe. Besides posing for advertisements, she was featured in Vogue Magazine. Reed was cast as a dancer in the film "Enemies of Women" in 1923. She continued as a Ziegfeld Girl for several years up to the mid-1920s.

== Personal life ==
Jessie Reed was notorious in her lifetime for her multiple marriages, primarily to well-to-do men. Her first marriage, however, was to a Texas vaudeville performer named Ollie Debrow (born Oliver Durburrow.) Debrow penned the song "Yodlin' Blues." The couple were married on March 11, 1912 in Houston. They had a daughter the following year, November 29, 1913.

The scandal broke out in 1916 when Debrow shot and killed a young chauffeur named Leslie Nash outside the Star Theatre in San Antonio, where Reed was performing. Debrow claimed Nash was having an affair with his wife. After a much-publicized trial and a hung jury in June 1917, Debrow, ably defended by attorney Carlos Bee, was acquitted in a retrial a month later. Reed divorced Debrow in October 1917, leaving her child with him.

Reed moved to New York earlier that year with her friend Nora Reed (née Flippen), who later became a motion picture actress. Perhaps adopting Nora's last name as a stage name (they posed as sisters), Jessie was known professionally and personally as Jessie Reed.

== Mistaken identity ==
Past articles and books have erroneously claimed that Jessie acquired the name Reed by marrying Lew Reed, a well-known vaudeville musician. Lew Reed (born Louis Herzberg) married a blues singer named Jessie Hyman in 1915 in New York City. She used her married name, Jessie Reed, in her act. People have often confused the two, perhaps because both women had been married to vaudeville performers.

== The "Gold Digger" ==
Jessie Reed's second marriage to "Dashing Dan" Caswell was fodder for the tabloids. Daniel Caswell was the son of a wealthy Ohio real estate developer. She met him while traveling to Boston by train with her Follies troupe. Reed and Caswell married in haste on November 12, 1920, in Pawtucket, RI. The union, replete with accusations of cruelty and drunkenness, didn't last long. They were divorced in January 1922. Reed returned to the Follies. Caswell soon married June Castleton, another famous Ziegfeld Girl.

In February 1924, rumors circulated that Reed was engaged to the millionaire Russell Griswold Colt (whose family founded the Colt revolver company and who had been married previously to Ethel Barrymore). Colt denied the claim. Shortly afterward, Reed eloped with William Tandy Young, Jr., a successful advertising executive based in Indiana. Reed settled down to a comfortable life in the suburbs, but the marriage didn't last. They were divorced in 1927.

In 1928, Jessie Reed married Leonard Minor Reno, a publishing executive who had been a flying ace in the First World War. They settled in Chicago, but were divorced in 1935.

== Death ==
Back on her own, Jessie Reed worked as a hostess at various nightclubs in Chicago. By 1940, newspapers reported that she was ill and broke and couldn't afford her hotel bill. She applied for relief. Money was raised by the Ziegfeld Club, a charity organization started by Billie Burke for ex-Follies performers. Struck down by pneumonia, Reed died at the Chicago Osteopathic Hospital on September 18, 1940. She is buried at Mt. Olivet Cemetery. Jessie Reed's obituary was published widely in the New York Times, Washington Post, and Variety.
