= Sid Fernandez =

American baseball player (born 1962)

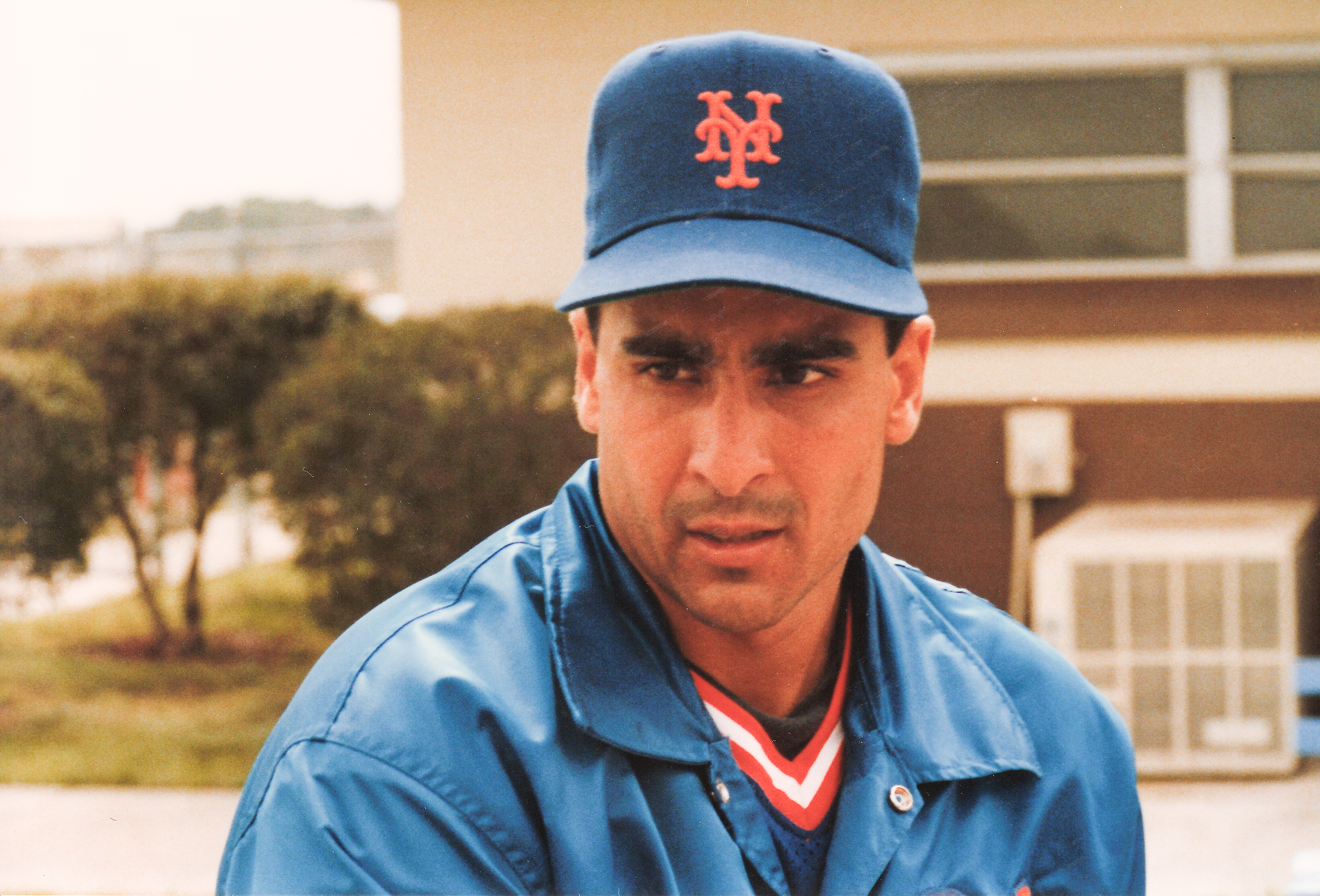
- Pitcher
- Born: October 12, 1962 (age 64); Honolulu, Hawaii, U.S.
- Batted: Left Threw: Left

MLB debut
- September 20, 1983, for the Los Angeles Dodgers

Last MLB appearance
- April 5, 1997, for the Houston Astros

MLB statistics
- Win–loss record: 114–96
- Earned run average: 3.36
- Strikeouts: 1,743
- Stats at Baseball Reference

Teams
- Los Angeles Dodgers (1983); New York Mets (1984–1993); Baltimore Orioles (1994–1995); Philadelphia Phillies (1995–1996); Houston Astros (1997)

Career highlights and awards
- 2× All-Star (1986, 1987); World Series champion (1986)

Charles Sidney Fernandez (born October 12, 1962) is an American former professional baseball left-handed pitcher who played in Major League Baseball (MLB) for the Los Angeles Dodgers, New York Mets, Baltimore Orioles, Philadelphia Phillies, and Houston Astros, from 1983 to 1997. Known by his nickname as El Sid, he finished his career with 114 wins, was a two-time All-Star, and helped the Mets win the World Series in 1986.

Born in Honolulu, Hawaii, Fernandez was proud of his roots and wore uniform number 50 in honor of Hawaii being the 50th state. The theme song to Hawaii Five-O was often played before his starts at Shea Stadium during his days with the Mets.

Fernandez has the distinction of being one of the most difficult pitchers to hit in MLB history. Fernandez has the third-lowest ratio of hits allowed per innings pitched in Major League history, behind only Nolan Ryan and Sandy Koufax.

Fernandez's career is often cited as being overlooked and underrated due to his achievements and that he was often overshadowed by his own teammates like Dwight Gooden, Ron Darling, and David Cone.

== Early life ==
According to the Portuguese Heritage Foundation, Fernandez is believed to be of Portuguese descent. He attended St. Louis High School (briefly) and Kaiser High School in Honolulu and pitched a no-hitter in his first high school start. He led the Kaiser High School Cougars to a state championship in 1981.

== Career ==
=== Los Angeles Dodgers ===
Fernandez was drafted out of high school at age 18 by the Los Angeles Dodgers, who chose him in the third round with the 73rd selection of the 1981 Major League Baseball draft.

Over 76 innings pitched with the Pioneer League's Lethbridge Dodgers, Fernandez struck out 128 batters, and posted a 5-1 record, with a 1.54 ERA his first professional season. After going 8-1 with a 1.91 ERA and 137 strikeouts for the class high A Vero Beach Dodgers in the first half of the 1982 season, Fernandez was promoted to the AAA Albuquerque Dukes, though he was less successful there, and was assigned to the AA San Antonio Dodgers for 1983. At San Antonio, Fernandez went 13-4 with a 2.82 ERA and 209 strikeouts to become only the second pitcher ever to win the Texas League's pitching triple crown.

Fernandez was named the Texas League Pitcher of the Year, and received a September call-up to the Los Angeles Dodgers, making his major league debut on September 20 versus the Houston Astros, entering the game in the sixth inning, and allowing one earned run in three innings of work. He made his first Major League start in the last game of the season, losing to the San Francisco Giants.

Fernandez fought weight problems throughout his time in the Dodgers organization. He did not make the Dodgers' post-season roster, and following their loss to the Philadelphia Phillies in the 1983 National League Championship Series, the Dodgers traded him and infielder Ross Jones to the New York Mets for Carlos Diaz and Bob Bailor.

=== New York Mets ===
In 1984, Fernandez posted a record of 6-5 with a 2.56 ERA and 123 strikeouts with the Triple-A Tidewater Tides, earning a call-up to the Mets in mid-July. Fernandez earned his first Major League win in his first start with the Mets in a 13-3 victory against the Houston Astros at the Astrodome on July 16. For the season, he went 6-6 with a 3.50 ERA in 15 starts in the big leagues.

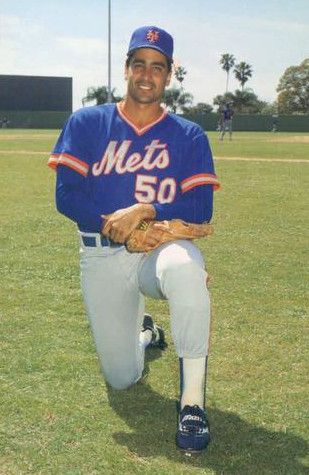
Fernandez in 1986

Fernandez split the 1985 season between Tidewater and the Mets. In 170 1/3 innings, Fernandez struck out 180 batters, while only allowing 108 hits for New York. Both ratios were the best in the Major Leagues, with second place in both categories going to teammate and Cy Young Award winner Dwight Gooden. Fernandez's average 5.71 hits allowed per nine innings was the second-best in National League history, behind only Carl Lundgren's mark of 5.65 in 1907. Fernandez struggled with walks and wound up finishing the year with a record of 9-9. In seven of his nine losses, he gave up two earned runs or fewer. Despite having the third-best record in baseball at 98-64, the Mets placed second in their division and missed the postseason.

Fernandez finished with a career-best record of 16-6 in 1986. A 12-2 start resulted in his first All-Star Game appearance and the first-ever appearance by a Hawaii native in the game. In his only inning of the All-Star Game, Fernandez walked the first two batters, but then struck out Brook Jacoby, Jim Rice, and Don Mattingly in succession to get out of the inning. During the regular season, Fernandez posted a 2.17 ERA at home and had a 5.03 in road games. Fernandez was one of four Mets pitchers to receive consideration for the 1986 Cy Young Award, marking the only Cy Young vote of his career. He finished seventh behind the Houston Astros' Mike Scott.

The Mets easily won the National League East with their record of 108-54. In Game 4 of the 1986 National League Championship Series, Fernandez went head to head with Scott with a chance to give Mets a 3-1 lead in the series. Fernandez gave up two home runs in the game, ultimately allowing three earned runs in six innings as the Astros prevailed by a 3-1 score. The Mets recovered to win the next two games and advance to the World Series.

In the World Series, Mets' manager Davey Johnson opted to go with a three-man rotation and use Fernandez out of the bullpen against the Boston Red Sox. Gooden struggled in Game 5, falling behind 4-0 in the game. Fernandez took over in the fifth inning and shut down the Red Sox for the next four innings, but Boston still came away with a 4-2 win to go up 3-2 in the series. After the Mets won the legendary Bill Buckner Game 6, the Red Sox took an early 3-0 lead in the decisive Game 7, forcing Mets' starter Ron Darling out of the game. Fernandez came in and retired seven batters in a row, including four strikeouts, to give New York some momentum. The Mets came back by scoring three runs in the sixth inning, three more in the seventh, and two in the eighth to get the 8-5 victory and claim their second World Series crown.

In 1987, Fernandez once again started strong to earn another All-Star Game bid, but was only 3-3 during the second half of the season, missing three weeks in August due to a knee injury. For the second year in row, Fernandez fared much better at home by 9-3 with a 2.98 ERA at Shea, compared to 3-5 record and a 5.05 ERA on the road. Similar to 1985, the Mets had a better record than two division winners, but were unable to win the NL East, and thus missed the postseason.

1988 saw Fernandez get out to a tough start and then recover later in the campaign. His ERA was 5.57 in mid-May, but dropped all the way to 3.32 at the All-Star break. Around that time, Fernandez went on a strikeout tear, punching out 50 batters in a five-game span. Fernandez finished the season well and the Mets won 100 games to make the playoffs for the second time in three years. Fernandez led the Majors in hits allowed per nine innings for the second time in his career. For the third year in a row, home-field advantage was a big factor for Fernandez, who went 8-4 with a 1.83 in home games and was 4-6 with a 4.36 ERA away from Shea.

With the 1988 National League Championship Series tied 2-2, Fernandez was tabbed to start Game 5 against the Los Angeles Dodgers. He pitched well for the first three innings, but gave up three runs in the fourth inning, and then allowed a three-run homer to Kirk Gibson in the fifth as the Dodgers went on to get a 7-4 victory. Los Angeles ultimately won the series in seven games.

Fernandez started the 1989 season in the bullpen, but quickly worked his way back in the rotation. Heading into the All-Star break, he had a record of 7-2 with an ERA under 3.00. In his first game after the break, Fernandez struck out a career-high 16 batters in eight innings against the Atlanta Braves, but lost the game on a ninth-inning home run. The strikeout total is still the all-time Mets' record for a left-hander. Fernandez ended the season with record of 14-5, the best winning percentage in the National League, and was ranked in the top 10 in the league in ERA, strikeouts, hits allowed per nine innings, strikeouts per nine innings, and strikeout-to-walk ratio. He pitched well on the road by compiling a 7-3 record with a 2.91 ERA. Fernandez won his last three games, although the Mets came up short of the postseason by placing second in their division.

In 1990, Fernandez finished the season with a record of 9-14, the worst of his career. He pitched well at home, going 8-5 with a 2.41 ERA, but was 1-9 with a 4.94 ERA on the road.

Fernandez broke his arm during spring training in 1991. He returned in mid-July and then went down again with knee problems in early September.

At the time of his knee surgery at the end of the 1991 season, Fernandez weighed 261 pounds (118 kg) and his weight was a cause of concern for the organization. Prior to the 1992 season, however, Fernandez lost 43 pounds (20 kg). Fernandez posted a team-leading 14 wins for the Mets, who finished in fifth place in their division for the second-straight year.

1993 saw the Mets finish with their worst record in recent memory at 59-103. Fernandez missed half the season after suffering another knee injury while covering first base. He came back to put up decent numbers and ultimately concluded the campaign with a 2.93 ERA. Fernandez left the Mets via free agency during the offseason.

=== Baltimore Orioles ===
After 1993, Fernandez never came close to his numbers with the Mets and never again played in the postseason. He was signed by the Baltimore Orioles for 1994 and managed to strike out 7.41 batters per nine innings in his only full season there before the 1994–95 Major League Baseball strike. But his 5.15 ERA was the worst of his career to that point and, despite again spending time on the disabled list, his 27 home runs allowed was second-worst in the Majors.

During the 1994 season, his weight had ballooned back up to 265 pounds (120 kg) and Fernandez feared that his weight had caused or exacerbated his recurring lower body injuries. At the beginning of spring training in 1995, however, he had gotten his weight back down to 225 pounds (102 kg).

He spent more time on the disabled list in 1995. On June 29, Fernandez allowed three home runs in a game for the first time in his career in a 5-1 loss to the Toronto Blue Jays, dropping his record to 0-4. He was released during the All-Star break.

=== Philadelphia Phillies ===
Three days after being released by the Orioles, Fernandez was signed by the Philadelphia Phillies. He showed flashes of brilliance — including a one-hit game over seven innings on July 26 — and went 6-1 for the Phils. He was named NL Pitcher of the Month in August by going 5-0. The resurgence earned Fernandez his only opening day start in 1996 but injuries ended his season in June and he again became a free agent.

=== Houston Astros ===
Fernandez was signed by the Houston Astros for 1997, but complained of elbow problems during spring training. After just one start, he was back on the disabled list; after unsuccessful rehabilitation, Fernandez retired on August 1, 1997.

Fernandez allowed only 6.85 hits per nine innings for his career which is the third-best ratio in history behind only Nolan Ryan and Sandy Koufax. Opponents batted only .209 against Fernandez.

== Post-retirement and comeback attempt ==
After retiring as a player, Fernandez moved back to his native Hawaiʻi. He was hired as an executive assistant to Mayor of Honolulu Jeremy Harris in an effort to find sponsors and users for sporting facilities on Oʻahu. In 1998, he became the Honolulu sports industry development director and traveled with Harris to Japan to recruit baseball teams there.

In 2000, Fernandez was the pitching coach of the semi-pro Alaska Baseball League's Hawaiʻi Island Movers.

In February 2001, Fernandez surprised many by showing up at New York Yankees spring training. He signed a minor league contract and pitched in one game for the Columbus Clippers on April 7. He pitched poorly and ended with a sore knee which put him back on the disabled list. He re-retired about a week later.

In 2003, Fernandez received two votes in his only year he was on the Hall of Fame ballot. In 2004, Fernandez served as a coach in a Hawaiʻi high school baseball all-star game. He also coached his son's high school baseball team.

Fernandez was selected as one of the 50 greatest sports figures in Hawai'i by Sports Illustrated.

On December 20, 2007, Fernandez's name appeared in the unsealed Kirk Radomski affidavit. The affidavit details Radomski receiving a $3,500 check from Fernandez dated February 2005, but the affidavit does not specify its purpose. Fernandez was one of only four baseball players listed in the affidavit who was not referred to in the Mitchell Report, the others being Rick Holifield, Pete Rose Jr., and Ryan Schurman.

== Pitching style ==
Fernandez was known for his deceptive delivery and long stride, which made his pitches difficult to track despite not having overwhelming velocity. This unorthodox pitching motion with a hesitation at the end, followed by a sudden slingshot sidearm delivery, allowed him to hide the ball from the batter until the last second. He also threw from a low angle. His sidearm angle made his fastball seem like it was rising up from his release point, and the batter would swing under it. This allowed his fastball, which rarely topped 90mph, to appear almost 10mph faster. Fernandez coupled his rising fastball with an effective curveball. His curve had a slow, sharp break that also benefited from his unique motion. Hitters trying to time his fastball usually couldn't adjust quickly enough and were left helpless to his big, breaking curve. Fernandez only threw his rising fastball and curveball, making him a rare starter who only threw two pitches for his career.

== Personal life ==
Fernandez and his wife, Noelani, had two children. They established the Sid Fernandez Foundation, which awarded college scholarships to students at their alma mater, Kaiser High School.

On September 28, 1996, Fernandez's father-in-law, Don Mike Gillis, was shot to death in Honolulu. Fernandez soon announced the dedication of his 1997 season to Gillis. A disturbed co-worker was convicted in 1997 of the murder.

Preceded by Nolan Ryan; José DeLeón	NL hits per nine innings 1988; 1990	Succeeded by José DeLeón; Pete Harnisch
