= Steve Ziem =

American baseball player

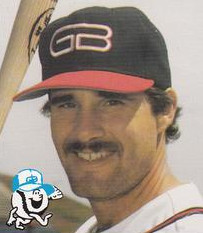
- Ziem in 1988
- Pitcher
- Born: October 24, 1961 (age 63); Milwaukee, Wisconsin
- Batted: Right Threw: Right

MLB debut
- April 30, 1987, for the Atlanta Braves

Last MLB appearance
- May 1, 1987, for the Atlanta Braves

MLB statistics
- Win–loss record: 0–1
- Earned run average: 7.71
- Strikeouts: 0
- Stats at Baseball Reference

Teams
- Atlanta Braves (1987)

Stephen Graeling Ziem (born October 24, 1961) is a former professional baseball player. A right-handed pitcher, Ziem pitched in two games in Major League Baseball for the Atlanta Braves in 1987.
