= Mark Wasinger =

American baseball player (born 1961)

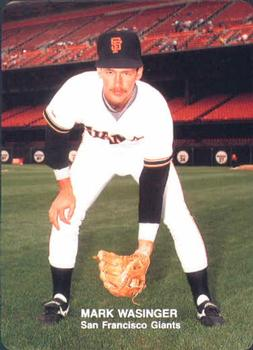
- Third baseman
- Born: August 4, 1961 (age 64); Monterey, California, U.S.
- Batted: Right Threw: Right

MLB debut
- May 27, 1986, for the San Diego Padres

Last MLB appearance
- April 21, 1988, for the San Francisco Giants

MLB statistics
- Batting average: .244
- Home runs: 1
- Runs batted in: 4
- Stats at Baseball Reference

Teams
- San Diego Padres (1986); San Francisco Giants (1987–1988)

Mark Thomas Wasinger (born August 4, 1961) is an American former professional baseball infielder who has had a long career as a scout and front-office official. A former major league third baseman, second baseman and shortstop, he appeared in 50 games between 1986 and 1988 for the San Diego Padres and San Francisco Giants. He threw and batted right-handed, and was listed at 6 feet (1.8 m) tall and 165 pounds (75 kg).

== Playing career ==
=== Amateur ===
Born in Monterey, California, Wasinger attended Old Dominion University. In 1981, he played collegiate summer baseball with the Cotuit Kettleers of the Cape Cod Baseball League. He was a third-round selection by the Padres in the 1982 Major League Baseball draft.

=== Professional ===
Wasinger rose through the Padre system, batted above .300 four times in his first five pro seasons, and was named a 1985 All-Star in the Double-A Texas League. But, following a three-game trial with San Diego in September 1986, he was traded to San Francisco in April 1987 and would spend the rest of his big-league tenure with the Giants. He split the 1987 season between the Giants and Triple-A, and collected 22 hits in a reserve role for San Francisco.

On May 9, 1987, in his second game as a Giant, Wasinger collected four hits in five at bats, including a home run, and scored three runs, in a 9–4 defeat of the Pittsburgh Pirates at Candlestick Park. His 888-game minor-league playing career essentially ended after the 1993 season.

== Coaching/front office career ==
Wasinger managed in independent league baseball, then became a scout for the Padres (1996–2002), where he scouted and signed Jake Peavy in 1999. He joined the Boston Red Sox in 2003, working as an amateur scouting regional cross-checker, a professional scout and special assignment scout for general managers Theo Epstein and Ben Cherington. During the 2011 Major League Baseball draft, Wasinger was among those who raised the profile of Tennessee high schooler Mookie Betts, whom the Red Sox would select in the fifth round. Betts rose rapidly through the Boston farm system, was called to the majors in 2014, and would become a four-time AL All-Star, and 2018 American League Most Valuable Player and 2018 world champion in a Red Sox uniform before his trade to the Los Angeles Dodgers in 2020.

Wasinger was promoted to special assistant/player personnel in January 2015. In September 2024, after 22 seasons with the Red Sox and serving under six different chiefs of baseball operations, he was dismissed as part of an overhaul of the club's scouting and player development departments.
