= Mark Davis (pitcher) =

American baseball player (born 1960)

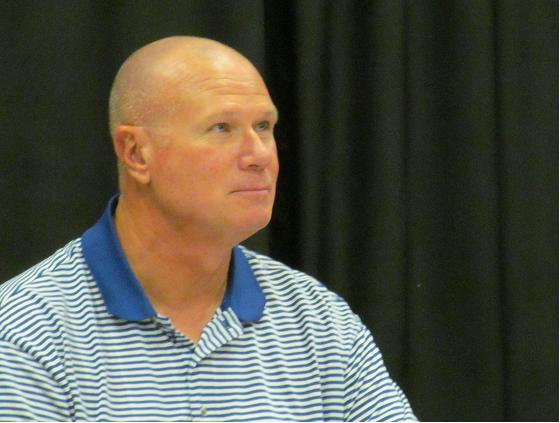
- Davis in 2012
- Pitcher
- Born: October 19, 1960 (age 65); Livermore, California, U.S.
- Batted: Left Threw: Left

MLB debut
- September 12, 1980, for the Philadelphia Phillies

Last MLB appearance
- September 28, 1997, for the Milwaukee Brewers

MLB statistics
- Win–loss record: 51–84
- Earned run average: 4.17
- Strikeouts: 1,007
- Saves: 96
- Stats at Baseball Reference

Teams
- Philadelphia Phillies (1980–1981); San Francisco Giants (1983–1987); San Diego Padres (1987–1989); Kansas City Royals (1990–1992); Atlanta Braves (1992); Philadelphia Phillies (1993); San Diego Padres (1993–1994); Milwaukee Brewers (1997)

Career highlights and awards
- 2× All-Star (1988, 1989); NL Cy Young Award (1989); NL Rolaids Relief Man Award (1989); NL saves leader (1989)

Mark William Davis (born October 19, 1960) is an American former professional baseball pitcher. Davis played in Major League Baseball (MLB) for the Philadelphia Phillies (1980–1981, 1993), San Francisco Giants (1983–1987), San Diego Padres (1987–1989, 1993–1994), Kansas City Royals (1990–1992), Atlanta Braves (1992), and Milwaukee Brewers (1997). He won the National League Cy Young Award in 1989, as a relief pitcher for the Padres. Davis batted and threw left-handed. He was the Minor League Pitching Coordinator for the Kansas City Royals organization, but stepped aside after the 2011 season to coach a single short-season affiliate in 2012.

== Playing career ==
Davis began his career in 1980 with the Philadelphia Phillies. He spent parts of five seasons with the San Francisco Giants after being dealt along with Mike Krukow and minor-league outfielder C.L. Penigar from the Phillies for Joe Morgan and Al Holland on December 14, 1982. He started a career-high 27 games in 1984 for a 5–17 win–loss record. He became a primary reliever the following season, but he did not establish himself as a top reliever until being traded to San Diego during the 1987 midseason.

In 1988, Davis became the Padres' closer, earning 28 saves and 44 in 1989, appearing in the All-Star Game in both seasons. He was a Cy Young Award winner in 1989 after a 1.85 ERA and 65 games finished in addition to his league-leading save total. In the last month of the season, he pitched 25 innings and did not allow any of the 19 runners he inherited to score. He was the fourth closer so honored in Award history. No closer would win the NL Cy Young again until Éric Gagné in 2003.

Davis signed as a free agent for US$13 million with the Kansas City Royals before the 1990 season. He pitched ineffectively early in the season and subsequently lost the closer role to Jeff Montgomery. After a brief stint for the Atlanta Braves in 1992, again he pitched with the Phillies and Padres from 1993–1994. After going out for two years, he returned to pitch until retiring with the Milwaukee Brewers in 1997. He never came close to matching his accomplishments for San Diego, earning only eleven saves over the last eight seasons of his career.

In a 15-season MLB career, Davis posted a 51–84 record, with a 4.17 ERA, and 96 saves, in 624 games pitched.

== Post-playing career ==
Davis spent three seasons on the Arizona Diamondbacks staff, as bullpen coach in 2003–2004, and pitching coach in 2005. From 2006 to 2010, Davis was the pitching coach for the Arizona League Royals. That October, he was promoted by the Kansas City Royals to Minor League Pitching Coordinator.

== Personal life ==
Davis lives in Scottsdale, Arizona, with Candy, his wife. They have two sons and two daughters.

== See also ==
- List of Major League Baseball annual saves leaders
