= Mark Grant (baseball) =

American baseball player and commentator (born 1963)

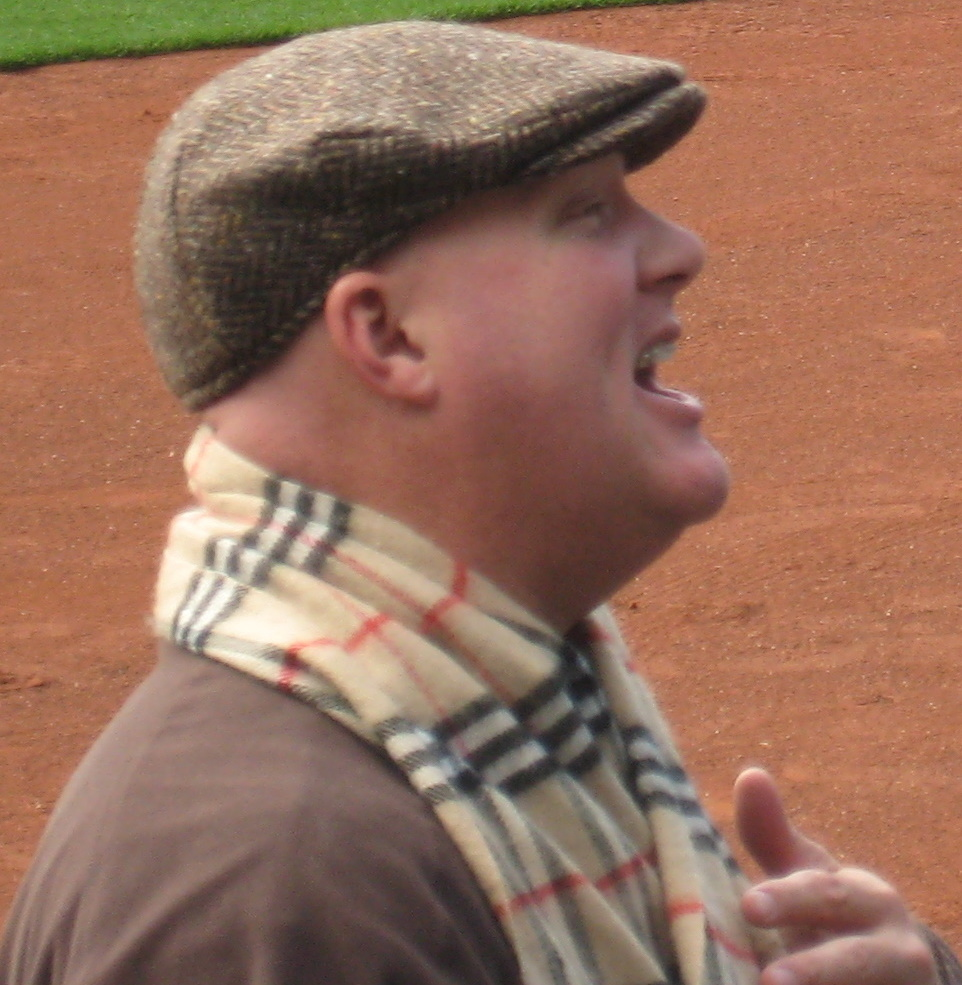
- Grant in 2008

San Diego Padres
- Pitcher
- Color commentator
- Born: October 24, 1963 (age 62); Aurora, Illinois, U.S.
- Batted: Right Threw: Right

MLB debut
- April 27, 1984, for the San Francisco Giants

Last MLB appearance
- July 26, 1993, for the Colorado Rockies

MLB statistics
- Win–loss record: 22–32
- Earned run average: 4.31
- Strikeouts: 382
- Stats at Baseball Reference

Teams
- San Francisco Giants (1984, 1986–1987); San Diego Padres (1987–1990); Atlanta Braves (1990); Seattle Mariners (1992); Houston Astros (1993); Colorado Rockies (1993)

Mark Andrew Grant (born October 24, 1963), nicknamed "Mud", is an American former professional baseball pitcher and is the color commentator for the San Diego Padres of Major League Baseball (MLB).

== Career ==
Grant was a first-round pick by the San Francisco Giants in the 1981 Major League Baseball draft. Grant played for the Giants from 1984 through 1987, when he was traded to the San Diego Padres. Grant played for the Padres through 1990 where he was again dealt to the Atlanta Braves for Derek Lilliquist. In the 1992 off-season, he signed with the Seattle Mariners to a one-year deal. In 1993, he signed to the Houston Astros. The same season on May 20, he was sent to the expansion team Colorado Rockies for Braulio Castillo. He was released from the club just two months later, and signed with the California Angels on August 20.

In 1994, he took a break from baseball to host a talk radio show for KFMB-AM along with broadcasting Padres games for the station. Grant returned to baseball in 1995 when he pitched for the Chicago Cubs AAA affiliate Iowa. In 1996 he briefly played for CPBL's Uni-President Lions and officially retired from baseball after leaving the Lions.

== Broadcasting ==
In 1996, Grant began working in the Padres' TV broadcast booth for Prime Sports Network. In 1997, Mark began his 15 year run with Channel 4 San Diego, teaming with a variety of partners including Mel Proctor and Matt Vasgersian. In 2012, he moved to the new regional television network Fox Sports San Diego (now Bally Sports San Diego), where he continued to provide color commentary with famed play-by-play announcer Dick Enberg until the latter's retirement after the 2016 season. His current main colleague is Don Orsillo. Grant's style of color commentary along with his humorous on-air antics have made "Mud" (a nickname given early in his playing career by Giants coach Danny Ozark in reference to Mudcat Grant) a favorite with Padres fans.

== Personal life ==
Grant played high school baseball for Joliet Catholic Academy in Joliet, Illinois.

Grant currently resides in Alpine, California, with his wife Mary, two sons, and a daughter. In 2007, he was honored by the Kiwanis Club of Alpine for his contributions to the community. He is also a frequent contributor to sports talk shows on XX Sports Radio in San Diego, as well as the Dave, Shelly, and Chainsaw show on 101.5 KGB FM.
