= Jessie Reid =

American baseball player (born 1962)

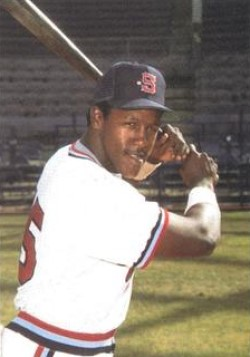
- Outfielder
- Born: June 1, 1962 (age 64); Honolulu, Hawaii, U.S.
- Batted: Left Threw: Left

Professional debut
- MLB: September 9, 1987, for the San Francisco Giants
- NPB: July 19, 1991, for the Kintetsu Buffaloes

Last appearance
- MLB: April 11, 1988, for the San Francisco Giants
- NPB: October 13, 1992, for the Kintetsu Buffaloes

MLB statistics
- Games played: 8
- At bats: 10
- Hits: 1

NPB statistics
- Batting average: .250
- Home runs: 20
- Runs batted in: 71
- Stats at Baseball Reference

Teams
- San Francisco Giants (1987–1988); Kintetsu Buffaloes (1991–1992)

Jessie Thomas Reid (born June 1, 1962) is an American former professional baseball player who played from 1987–1988 for the San Francisco Giants.
