= 1987 Major League Baseball All-Star Game =

1987 American baseball competition

	1	2	3	4	5	6	7	8	9	10	11	12	13	R	H	E
National League	0	0	0	0	0	0	0	0	0	0	0	0	2	2	8	2
American League	0	0	0	0	0	0	0	0	0	0	0	0	0	0	6	1
- Date: July 14, 1987
- Venue: Oakland–Alameda County Coliseum
- City: Oakland, California
- Managers: Davey Johnson (NYM); John McNamara (BOS)
- MVP: Tim Raines (MON)
- Attendance: 49,671
- Ceremonial first pitch: Larry Doby
- Television: NBC
- TV announcers: Vin Scully and Joe Garagiola
- Radio: CBS
- Radio announcers: Brent Musburger, Jerry Coleman and Johnny Bench

The 1987 Major League Baseball All-Star Game was the 58th playing of the midsummer classic between the all-stars of the American League (AL) and National League (NL), the two leagues comprising Major League Baseball. The game was held on July 14, 1987, at the Oakland–Alameda County Coliseum in Oakland, California, the home of the Oakland Athletics of the American League. The game resulted in the National League defeating the American League 2-0 in 13 innings. Montreal Expos outfielder Tim Raines was named the Most Valuable Player. This was the final All-Star Game to be hosted by the Athletics in Oakland, as the franchise has not hosted the All-Star Game since and relocated to Sacramento after the 2024 season.

== Rosters ==
Players in italics have since been inducted into the National Baseball Hall of Fame.

=== National League ===
Starters
Position	Player	Team
P	Mike Scott	Astros
C	Gary Carter	Mets
1B	Jack Clark	Cardinals
2B	Ryne Sandberg	Cubs
3B	Mike Schmidt	Phillies
SS	Ozzie Smith	Cardinals
OF	Andre Dawson	Cubs
OF	Darryl Strawberry	Mets
OF	Eric Davis	Reds

Pitchers
Position	Player	Team
P	Steve Bedrosian	Phillies
P	Sid Fernandez	Mets
P	John Franco	Reds
P	Orel Hershiser	Dodgers
P	Rick Reuschel	Pirates
P	Lee Smith	Cubs
P	Rick Sutcliffe	Cubs

Reserves
Position	Player	Team
C	Bo Díaz	Reds
C	Ozzie Virgil Jr.	Braves
1B	Keith Hernandez	Mets
2B	Juan Samuel	Phillies
3B	Tim Wallach	Expos
SS	Hubie Brooks	Expos
OF	Pedro Guerrero	Dodgers
OF	Tony Gwynn	Padres
OF	Jeffrey Leonard	Giants
OF	Willie McGee	Cardinals
OF	Dale Murphy	Braves
OF	Tim Raines	Expos

=== American League ===
Starters
Position	Player	Team
P	Bret Saberhagen	Royals
C	Terry Kennedy	Orioles
1B	Don Mattingly	Yankees
2B	Willie Randolph	Yankees
3B	Wade Boggs	Red Sox
SS	Cal Ripken Jr.	Orioles
OF	George Bell	Blue Jays
OF	Rickey Henderson	Yankees
OF	Dave Winfield	Yankees

Pitchers
Position	Player	Team
P	Tom Henke	Blue Jays
P	Jay Howell	Athletics
P	Bruce Hurst	Red Sox
P	Mark Langston	Mariners
P	Jack Morris	Tigers
P	Dan Plesac	Brewers
P	Dave Righetti	Yankees
P	Mike Witt	Angels

Reserves
Position	Player	Team
C	Matt Nokes	Tigers
1B	George Brett	Royals
1B	Dwight Evans	Red Sox
1B	Mark McGwire	Athletics
1B	Pat Tabler	Indians
2B	Harold Reynolds	Mariners
2B	Lou Whitaker	Tigers
3B	Kevin Seitzer	Royals
SS	Tony Fernández	Blue Jays
SS	Alan Trammell	Tigers
OF	Harold Baines	White Sox
OF	Larry Parrish	Rangers
OF	Kirby Puckett	Twins

== Game ==
=== Coaching staff ===
Description	NL	AL
Managers	Davey Johnson	John McNamara
Coaches	Roger Craig	Jim Fregosi
Coaches	Hal Lanier	Tony La Russa
Honorary Captains	Billy Williams	Catfish Hunter

=== Umpires ===
Home Plate	Don Denkinger (AL)
First Base	Dick Stello (NL)
Second Base	Vic Voltaggio (AL)
Third Base	Joe West (NL)
Left Field	Derryl Cousins (AL)
Right Field	Bob Davidson (NL)

=== Starting lineups ===
National League				American League			
Order	Player	Team	Position	Order	Player	Team	Position
1	Eric Davis	Reds	OF	1	Rickey Henderson	Yankees	OF
2	Ryne Sandberg	Cubs	2B	2	Don Mattingly	Yankees	1B
3	Andre Dawson	Cubs	OF	3	Wade Boggs	Red Sox	3B
4	Mike Schmidt	Phillies	3B	4	George Bell	Blue Jays	OF
5	Jack Clark	Cardinals	1B	5	Dave Winfield	Yankees	OF
6	Darryl Strawberry	Mets	OF	6	Cal Ripken Jr.	Orioles	SS
7	Gary Carter	Mets	C	7	Terry Kennedy	Orioles	C
8	Ozzie Smith	Cardinals	SS	8	Willie Randolph	Yankees	2B
9	Mike Scott	Astros	P	9	Bret Saberhagen	Royals	P

=== Game summary ===
Tuesday, July 14, 1987 5:35 pm (PT) at Oakland–Alameda County Coliseum in Oakland, California
Team	1	2	3	4	5	6	7	8	9	10	11	12	13	R	H	E
National League	0	0	0	0	0	0	0	0	0	0	0	0	2	2	8	2
American League	0	0	0	0	0	0	0	0	0	0	0	0	0	0	6	1
WP: Lee Smith (1-0) LP: Jay Howell (0-1) Sv: Sid Fernandez (1); Home runs: NL: none AL: none Attendance: 49,671, Time of Game: 3:39

While the previous three All-Star games had had good pitching, the 1987 Midsummer Classic had great pitching. Never before was an All-Star game scoreless after five innings; however, the 1987 game did not see a run until the 13th inning.

After 12 scoreless innings, National League catcher Ozzie Virgil Jr. began the 13th with a single off American League pitcher Jay Howell. Howell would get pitcher Lee Smith to strike out trying to bunt, however, shortstop Hubie Brooks followed with a single, moving Virgil up to second base. Outfielder Willie McGee lined out for the second out of the inning, bringing up outfielder Tim Raines. Raines delivered in the clutch, with a two-run triple, giving the National League a 2-0 lead. Second baseman Juan Samuel lined out, ending the inning. In the bottom of the 13th, Sid Fernandez walked leadoff man Kevin Seitzer, but retired the next three batters in order to give the National League the victory. Due to the length of the game, Lee Smith, a Cubs pitcher at the time, needed to bat. He did not bring his Cubs helmet so he used a Montreal Expos helmet likely from either Tim Wallach or Hubie Brooks.
