= 1987 Philadelphia Phillies season =

Major League Baseball season

1987 Philadelphia Phillies
- League: National League
- Division: East
- Ballpark: Veterans Stadium
- City: Philadelphia
- Owners: Bill Giles
- General managers: Bill Giles
- Managers: John Felske, Lee Elia
- Television: WTAF; PRISM
- Radio: WCAU (Harry Kalas, Richie Ashburn, Andy Musser, Chris Wheeler)

The 1987 Philadelphia Phillies season was the 105th season for the Phillies. It was the third and final season with John Felske as manager, as he was fired on June 18 when the team won just 29 of their first 61 games. With Lee Elia at the helm, the team maneuvered itself to 51 wins in the next 101 games to finish fourth in the National League East.

== Offseason ==
- October 7, 1986: Tom Gorman was released by the Phillies.
- November 16, 1986: Rocky Childress was purchased from the Phillies by the Houston Astros.

== Regular season ==
After getting off to a dismal 1–8 start, the season began to turn when Mike Schmidt hit his 500th career home run in Pittsburgh on April 18. Schmidt cracked the milestone long ball on a 3–0 count off the Pirates' Don Robinson with two men on base in the ninth inning, which rallied the club from a one-run deficit to an eventual 8–6 victory.

Schmidt slammed three home runs in an 11–6 victory over the Expos on June 14 in Montreal, eventually finishing the season with 35 and 530 career homers.

Phillies pitcher Kevin Gross was pitching against the Chicago Cubs on August 10, 1987. Gross was caught with sandpaper in his glove and suspended for 10 games.

After going as high as six games over .500 in late August, the team crashed to a 13–21 finish and tied for fourth place in the NL East with the Pirates.

=== Season standings ===
NL East
Team	W	L	Pct.	GB	Home	Road
St. Louis Cardinals	95	67	.586	—	49‍–‍32	46‍–‍35
New York Mets	92	70	.568	3	49‍–‍32	43‍–‍38
Montreal Expos	91	71	.562	4	48‍–‍33	43‍–‍38
Philadelphia Phillies	80	82	.494	15	43‍–‍38	37‍–‍44
Pittsburgh Pirates	80	82	.494	15	47‍–‍34	33‍–‍48
Chicago Cubs	76	85	.472	18½	40‍–‍40	36‍–‍45

=== Record vs. opponents ===
1987 National League record Sources:
Team	ATL	CHC	CIN	HOU	LAD	MON	NYM	PHI	PIT	SD	SF	STL
Atlanta	—	6–5	8–10	8–10	6–12	3–9	7–5	7–5	7–5	6–12	8–10	3–9
Chicago	5–6	—	6–6	8–4	6–6	10–8	9–9	8–10	4–14	9–3	5–7	6–12
Cincinnati	10–8	6–6	—	13–5	10–8	6–6	7–5	5–7	4–8	12–6	7–11	4–8
Houston	10–8	4–8	5–13	—	12–6	7–5	6–6	6–6	6–6	5–13	10–8	5–7
Los Angeles	12–6	6–6	8–10	6–12	—	3–9	6–6	2–10	6–6	11–7	10–8	3–9
Montreal	9–3	8–10	6–6	5–7	9–3	—	8–10	10–8	11–7	9–3	5–7	11–7
New York	5–7	9–9	5–7	6–6	6–6	10–8	—	13–5	12–6	8–4	9–3	9–9
Philadelphia	5–7	10–8	7–5	6–6	10–2	8–10	5–13	—	11–7	8–4	2–10	8–10
Pittsburgh	5–7	14–4	8–4	6–6	6–6	7–11	6–12	7–11	—	8–4	6–6	7–11
San Diego	12–6	3–9	6–12	13–5	7–11	3–9	4–8	4–8	4–8	—	5–13	4–8
San Francisco	10–8	7–5	11–7	8–10	8–10	7–5	3–9	10–2	6–6	13–5	—	7–5
St. Louis	9–3	12–6	8–4	7–5	9–3	7–11	9–9	10–8	11–7	8–4	5–7	—

=== Notable transactions ===
- April 2, 1987: Ronn Reynolds was traded by the Philadelphia Phillies to the Houston Astros for Jeff Calhoun.
- June 2, 1987: Jim Vatcher was drafted by the Phillies in the 20th round of the 1987 Major League Baseball draft.
- June 10, 1987: Mike Easler was traded by the Phillies to the New York Yankees for Keith Hughes and Shane Turner.
- June 24, 1987: Dan Schatzeder and cash were traded by the Phillies to the Minnesota Twins for Danny Clay and Tom Schwarz (minors).

=== 1987 Game Log ===
Legend
	Phillies win
	Phillies loss
	Postponement
**Bold**	Phillies team member

1987 Game Log
Overall Record: 80–82
April (7–13)

#	Date	Opponent	Score	Win	Loss	Save	Attendance	Record
1	April 7	@ Braves	0–6	Rick Mahler (1–0)	**Shane Rawley** (0–1)	None	31,343	0–1
2	April 9	@ Braves	7–8 (10)	Gene Garber (1–0)	**Dan Schatzeder** (0–1)	None	8,907	0–2
3	April 10	Cubs	3–4	Ed Lynch (1–0)	**Kevin Gross** (0–1)	Dickie Noles (1)	43,212	0–3
4	April 11	Cubs	1–9	Rick Sutcliffe (1–1)	**Joe Cowley** (0–1)	None	21,581	0–4
5	April 12	Cubs	9–8 (10)	**Steve Bedrosian** (1–0)	Lee Smith (0–1)	None	23,769	1–4
6	April 13	Cubs	2–5	Jamie Moyer (1–0)	**Don Carman** (0–1)	Lee Smith (1)	15,366	1–5
7	April 14	Mets	5–7	Ron Darling (1–0)	**Steve Bedrosian** (1–1)	Jesse Orosco (3)	22,836	1–6
8	April 15	Mets	1–4	Sid Fernandez (2–0)	**Kevin Gross** (0–2)	Doug Sisk (2)	21,995	1–7
9	April 16	Mets	3–9	Rick Aguilera (1–0)	**Joe Cowley** (0–2)	None	16,350	1–8
10	April 17	@ Pirates	6–2 (10)	**Steve Bedrosian** (2–1)	Barry Jones (0–1)	None	10,105	2–8
11	April 18	@ Pirates	8–6	**Kent Tekulve** (1–0)	Don Robinson (2–1)	None	19,361	3–8
12	April 19	@ Pirates	2–5	Doug Drabek (1–1)	**Bruce Ruffin** (0–1)	Don Robinson (2)	7,962	3–9
13	April 20	@ Expos	4–3	**Dan Schatzeder** (1–1)	Jay Tibbs (1–2)	**Kent Tekulve** (1)	50,482	4–9
14	April 22	@ Expos	3–7	Neal Heaton (2–1)	**Joe Cowley** (0–3)	None	8,114	4–10
15	April 23	@ Expos	5–6	Randy St. Claire (1–0)	**Mike Jackson** (0–1)	Andy McGaffigan (2)	5,632	4–11
–	April 24	Pirates	Postponed (rain); Makeup: June 29 as a traditional double-header					
16	April 25	Pirates	3–2	**Don Carman** (1–1)	Doug Drabek (1–2)	**Kent Tekulve** (2)	18,553	5–11
17	April 26	Pirates	6–4	**Bruce Ruffin** (1–1)	Rick Reuschel (0–1)	**Steve Bedrosian** (1)	30,234	6–11
18	April 27	Expos	4–6	Neal Heaton (3–1)	**Kevin Gross** (0–3)	Randy St. Claire (3)	15,149	6–12
19	April 28	Expos	1–7	Floyd Youmans (1–2)	**Joe Cowley** (0–4)	Andy McGaffigan (3)	11,598	6–13
20	April 29	Expos	5–0	**Shane Rawley** (1–1)	Bob Sebra (1–3)	None	14,588	7–13

May (15–11)

#	Date	Opponent	Score	Win	Loss	Save	Attendance	Record
21	May 1	Reds	5–8	Mario Soto (2–0)	**Don Carman** (1–2)	Ron Robinson (4)	21,249	7–14
22	May 2	Reds	8–3	**Bruce Ruffin** (2–1)	Tom Browning (2–4)	None	32,103	8–14
23	May 3	Reds	6–9	Bill Gullickson (4–1)	**Kevin Gross** (0–4)	John Franco (4)	33,062	8–15
24	May 5	Astros	1–5	Danny Darwin (2–1)	**Shane Rawley** (1–2)	None	15,611	8–16
25	May 6	Astros	2–3	Larry Andersen (3–1)	**Kent Tekulve** (1–1)	Dave Smith (6)	15,809	8–17
26	May 8	@ Reds	3–4	Tom Browning (3–4)	**Bruce Ruffin** (2–2)	John Franco (6)	37,176	8–18
27	May 9	@ Reds	4–2	**Kevin Gross** (1–4)	Bill Gullickson (4–2)	None	36,910	9–18
28	May 10	@ Reds	4–3	**Shane Rawley** (2–2)	Ted Power (3–1)	**Steve Bedrosian** (2)	29,867	10–18
29	May 11	@ Astros	7–6	**Dan Schatzeder** (2–1)	Larry Andersen (3–2)	**Steve Bedrosian** (3)	11,369	11–18
30	May 12	@ Astros	2–5	Bob Knepper (2–2)	**Mike Jackson** (0–2)	Aurelio López (1)	8,950	11–19
31	May 13	Braves	5–10	David Palmer (3–4)	**Bruce Ruffin** (2–3)	Jim Acker (3)	16,142	11–20
32	May 14	Braves	5–4	**Kevin Gross** (2–4)	Rick Mahler (2–5)	**Steve Bedrosian** (4)	17,705	12–20
33	May 15	Padres	7–4	**Shane Rawley** (3–2)	Ed Whitson (4–5)	**Steve Bedrosian** (5)	22,907	13–20
34	May 16	Padres	9–0	**Don Carman** (2–2)	Jimmy Jones (0–1)	None	21,713	14–20
35	May 17	Padres	5–6	Andy Hawkins (1–5)	**Mike Jackson** (0–3)	Lance McCullers (4)	34,964	14–21
36	May 18	Dodgers	5–3	**Bruce Ruffin** (3–3)	Rick Honeycutt (2–2)	**Steve Bedrosian** (6)	17,314	15–21
–	May 19	Dodgers	Postponed (rain); Makeup: August 21 as a traditional double-header					
37	May 21	Dodgers	6–3	**Shane Rawley** (4–2)	Alejandro Peña (0–4)	**Steve Bedrosian** (7)	13,639	16–21
38	May 22	Giants	1–2	Atlee Hammaker (2–1)	**Don Carman** (2–3)	Scott Garrelts (6)	18,744	16–22
39	May 23	Giants	9–8	**Steve Bedrosian** (3–1)	Jeff Robinson (3–2)	None	21,841	17–22
40	May 24	Giants	3–6	Mike LaCoss (5–1)	**Kent Tekulve** (1–2)	Jeff Robinson (7)	28,541	17–23
41	May 25	@ Padres	6–4	**Dan Schatzeder** (3–1)	Dave Dravecky (1–5)	**Steve Bedrosian** (8)	11,504	18–23
42	May 26	@ Padres	3–1	**Shane Rawley** (5–2)	Jimmy Jones (0–2)	**Steve Bedrosian** (9)	9,347	19–23
43	May 27	@ Padres	6–4	**Don Carman** (3–3)	Andy Hawkins (2–6)	**Steve Bedrosian** (10)	8,164	20–23
44	May 29	@ Dodgers	0–6	Bob Welch (6–2)	**Bruce Ruffin** (3–4)	None	36,036	20–24
45	May 30	@ Dodgers	3–0	**Kevin Gross** (3–4)	Orel Hershiser (4–6)	None	30,216	21–24
46	May 31	@ Dodgers	3–1	**Shane Rawley** (6–2)	Rick Honeycutt (2–4)	**Steve Bedrosian** (11)	39,204	22–24

June (13–15)

#	Date	Opponent	Score	Win	Loss	Save	Attendance	Record
47	June 1	@ Giants	2–9	Atlee Hammaker (3–1)	**Don Carman** (3–4)	None	6,655	22–25
48	June 2	@ Giants	7–6	**Wally Ritchie** (1–0)	Mark Davis (3–4)	**Steve Bedrosian** (12)	10,826	23–25
49	June 3	@ Giants	1–4	Mike LaCoss (6–2)	**Bruce Ruffin** (3–5)	Jeff Robinson (8)	10,522	23–26
50	June 5	Expos	7–6	**Kevin Gross** (4–4)	Andy McGaffigan (0–1)	**Steve Bedrosian** (13)	26,508	24–26
51	June 6	Expos	4–3	**Shane Rawley** (7–2)	Bob Sebra (3–6)	None	30,177	25–26
52	June 7	Expos	3–1	**Mike Jackson** (1–3)	Bryn Smith (3–2)	**Steve Bedrosian** (14)	43,298	26–26
53	June 8	Cardinals	8–12	Ricky Horton (3–0)	**Don Carman** (3–5)	None	23,422	26–27
54	June 9	Cardinals	3–2	**Bruce Ruffin** (4–5)	Danny Cox (6–3)	**Steve Bedrosian** (15)	22,009	27–27
55	June 10	Cardinals	1–3	Greg Mathews (4–4)	**Kevin Gross** (4–5)	Todd Worrell (14)	27,976	27–28
56	June 12	@ Expos	6–13	Bryn Smith (4–2)	**Shane Rawley** (7–3)	None	20,031	27–29
57	June 13	@ Expos	5–7	Neal Heaton (9–2)	**Mike Jackson** (1–4)	Tim Burke (7)	24,221	27–30
58	June 14	@ Expos	11–6	**Don Carman** (4–5)	Lary Sorensen (3–3)	None	30,209	28–30
59	June 15	@ Cubs	3–2	**Kent Tekulve** (2–2)	Lee Smith (2–4)	**Steve Bedrosian** (16)	18,643	29–30
60	June 16	@ Cubs	2–7	Steve Trout (3–1)	**Kevin Gross** (4–6)	Lee Smith (16)	30,007	29–31
61	June 17	@ Cubs	3–5	Jamie Moyer (7–4)	**Shane Rawley** (7–4)	Lee Smith (17)	26,447	29–32
62	June 18	@ Cubs	7–9	Rick Sutcliffe (9–3)	**Mike Jackson** (1–5)	Lee Smith (18)	22,870	29–33
63	June 19	@ Mets	1–8	John Mitchell (1–1)	**Don Carman** (4–6)	None	46,824	29–34
64	June 20	@ Mets	2–3	Dwight Gooden (3–1)	**Kent Tekulve** (2–3)	None	49,043	29–35
65	June 21	@ Mets	3–8	Sid Fernandez (9–3)	**Kevin Gross** (4–7)	Roger McDowell (8)	44,838	29–36
66	June 23	@ Cardinals	4–1	**Shane Rawley** (8–4)	Lee Tunnell (3–2)	**Steve Bedrosian** (17)	30,455	30–36
67	June 24	@ Cardinals	3–5	Todd Worrell (2–3)	**Mike Jackson** (1–6)	None	29,328	30–37
68	June 25	@ Cardinals	0–3	Greg Mathews (5–5)	**Bruce Ruffin** (4–6)	None	38,357	30–38
69	June 26	Mets	5–2	**Kevin Gross** (5–7)	Sid Fernandez (9–4)	**Steve Bedrosian** (18)	36,263	31–38
70	June 27	Mets	4–5	Terry Leach (6–0)	**Shane Rawley** (8–5)	Roger McDowell (9)	40,128	31–39
71	June 28	Mets	5–4	**Doug Bair** (1–0)	Roger McDowell (4–3)	None	52,206	32–39
72	June 29 (1)	Pirates	6–5	**Mike Jackson** (2–6)	Barry Jones (2–2)	**Steve Bedrosian** (19)	see 2nd game	33–39
73	June 29 (2)	Pirates	11–3	**Doug Bair** (2–0)	Mike Dunne (3–3)	**Wally Ritchie** (1)	30,046	34–39
74	June 30	Pirates	6–4	**Kevin Gross** (6–7)	Doug Drabek (1–7)	**Steve Bedrosian** (20)	20,598	35–39

July (18–9)

#	Date	Opponent	Score	Win	Loss	Save	Attendance	Record
75	July 1	Pirates	11–4	**Shane Rawley** (9–5)	Dorn Taylor (2–3)	None	19,977	36–39
76	July 2	Astros	6–7	Larry Andersen (6–4)	**Steve Bedrosian** (3–2)	Dave Smith (15)	19,213	36–40
77	July 3	Astros	2–1	**Bruce Ruffin** (5–6)	Nolan Ryan (4–9)	**Steve Bedrosian** (21)	56,825	37–40
78	July 4	Astros	9–3	**Tom Hume** (1–0)	Jim Deshaies (8–3)	**Mike Jackson** (1)	20,178	38–40
79	July 5	Astros	2–8	Mike Scott (10–4)	**Kevin Gross** (6–8)	Larry Andersen (2)	30,179	38–41
80	July 6	@ Reds	9–6	**Mike Jackson** (3–6)	Ted Power (6–4)	**Steve Bedrosian** (22)	18,802	39–41
81	July 7	@ Reds	10–8 (10)	**Kent Tekulve** (3–3)	John Franco (5–3)	**Steve Bedrosian** (23)	22,553	40–41
82	July 8	@ Reds	7–2	**Bruce Ruffin** (6–6)	Guy Hoffman (7–3)	None	26,082	41–41
83	July 9	@ Braves	6–11	Jeff Dedmon (3–3)	**Tom Hume** (1–1)	None	10,671	41–42
84	July 10	@ Braves	5–2	**Shane Rawley** (10–5)	Doyle Alexander (4–5)	**Steve Bedrosian** (24)	12,068	42–42
85	July 11	@ Braves	4–5	Rick Mahler (6–9)	**Don Carman** (4–7)	Jim Acker (7)	30,503	42–43
86	July 12	@ Braves	3–9	Randy O'Neal (4–1)	**Bruce Ruffin** (6–7)	Paul Assenmacher (1)	16,579	42–44
–	July 14	**1987 Major League Baseball All-Star Game at Oakland–Alameda County Coliseum in Oakland**						
87	July 16	@ Astros	1–2	Danny Darwin (6–6)	**Mike Jackson** (3–7)	None	19,614	42–45
88	July 17	@ Astros	2–1	**Shane Rawley** (11–5)	Mike Scott (10–6)	**Steve Bedrosian** (25)	32,608	43–45
89	July 18	@ Astros	4–2	**Don Carman** (5–7)	Bob Knepper (3–11)	**Steve Bedrosian** (26)	30,368	44–45
90	July 19	@ Astros	4–1	**Bruce Ruffin** (7–7)	Nolan Ryan (4–11)	None	25,143	45–45
91	July 20	Reds	6–10 (11)	John Franco (6–3)	**Mike Jackson** (3–8)	None	27,347	45–46
92	July 21	Reds	3–4	Bill Gullickson (10–6)	**Kevin Gross** (6–9)	Rob Murphy (2)	27,184	45–47
93	July 22	Reds	5–3	**Shane Rawley** (12–5)	Tom Browning (5–8)	**Steve Bedrosian** (27)	28,046	46–47
94	July 23	Braves	5–1	**Don Carman** (6–7)	Charlie Puleo (3–3)	None	29,163	47–47
95	July 24	Braves	11–5	**Bruce Ruffin** (8–7)	Rick Mahler (6–10)	None	26,307	48–47
96	July 25	Braves	1–2	David Palmer (5–8)	**Tom Hume** (1–2)	Gene Garber (9)	32,077	48–48
97	July 26	Braves	7–3	**Kent Tekulve** (4–3)	Doyle Alexander (5–7)	None	47,022	49–48
98	July 28	@ Pirates	5–2	**Shane Rawley** (13–5)	Rick Reuschel (8–5)	None	16,270	50–48
99	July 29	@ Pirates	4–3	**Don Carman** (7–7)	Doug Drabek (2–10)	**Steve Bedrosian** (28)	28,392	51–48
100	July 30	@ Pirates	1–0	**Bruce Ruffin** (9–7)	John Smiley (3–2)	**Steve Bedrosian** (29)	11,769	52–48
101	July 31	@ Cubs	8–5	**Kent Tekulve** (5–3)	Scott Sanderson (4–6)	**Steve Bedrosian** (30)	32,930	53–48

August (15–15)

#	Date	Opponent	Score	Win	Loss	Save	Attendance	Record
102	August 1	@ Cubs	3–5	Les Lancaster (3–1)	**Tom Hume** (1–3)	Lee Smith (26)	33,002	53–49
103	August 2	@ Cubs	2–3 (10)	Lee Smith (3–6)	**Jeff Calhoun** (0–1)	None	33,629	53–50
104	August 3	@ Mets	2–3 (11)	Roger McDowell (6–3)	**Kent Tekulve** (5–4)	None	50,297	53–51
105	August 4	@ Mets	3–5	Dwight Gooden (9–3)	**Bruce Ruffin** (9–8)	None	38,252	53–52
106	August 5	@ Mets	3–13	John Mitchell (3–3)	**Kevin Gross** (6–10)	Randy Myers (2)	28,178	53–53
107	August 6	Cardinals	2–5	John Tudor (3–1)	**Tom Hume** (1–4)	Todd Worrell (23)	31,635	53–54
108	August 7	Cardinals	15–5	**Shane Rawley** (14–5)	Joe Magrane (6–3)	None	31,247	54–54
109	August 8	Cardinals	5–9	Todd Worrell (6–6)	**Don Carman** (7–8)	None	46,732	54–55
110	August 9	Cardinals	8–7 (14)	**Wally Ritchie** (2–0)	Ricky Horton (6–2)	None	37,158	55–55
111	August 10	Cubs	4–2	**Todd Frohwirth** (1–0)	Jamie Moyer (9–9)	**Steve Bedrosian** (31)	26,796	56–55
112	August 11	Cubs	9–8 (13)	**Kevin Gross** (7–10)	Bob Tewksbury (1–8)	None	30,459	57–55
113	August 12	Cubs	13–7	**Jeff Calhoun** (1–1)	Ed Lynch (1–7)	None	36,190	58–55
114	August 13	@ Cardinals	4–2 (13)	**Steve Bedrosian** (4–2)	Ken Dayley (7–3)	**Wally Ritchie** (2)	37,088	59–55
115	August 14	@ Cardinals	4–8	Greg Mathews (8–8)	**Bruce Ruffin** (9–9)	Todd Worrell (25)	47,913	59–56
116	August 15	@ Cardinals	5–2	**Kevin Gross** (8–10)	Bob Forsch (10–4)	**Steve Bedrosian** (32)	48,309	60–56
117	August 16	@ Cardinals	4–3	**Shane Rawley** (15–5)	John Tudor (3–2)	**Steve Bedrosian** (33)	43,759	61–56
118	August 18	Padres	4–9 (11)	Rich Gossage (4–3)	**Wally Ritchie** (2–1)	None	27,867	61–57
119	August 19	Padres	6–5	**Bruce Ruffin** (10–9)	Mark Grant (3–7)	**Jeff Calhoun** (1)	30,595	62–57
120	August 20	Padres	10–2	**Freddie Toliver** (1–0)	Eric Show (6–15)	**Wally Ritchie** (3)	23,446	63–57
121	August 21 (1)	Dodgers	2–1 (11)	**Kent Tekulve** (6–4)	Matt Young (5–7)	None	see 2nd game	64–57
122	August 21 (2)	Dodgers	7–3	**Shane Rawley** (16–5)	Tim Leary (3–9)	None	48,656	65–57
123	August 22	Dodgers	2–0	**Mike Maddux** (1–0)	Rick Honeycutt (2–12)	**Kent Tekulve** (3)	27,160	66–57
124	August 23	Dodgers	1–5	Orel Hershiser (13–12)	**Don Carman** (7–9)	None	36,407	66–58
125	August 24	Giants	1–6	Rick Reuschel (9–6)	**Bruce Ruffin** (10–10)	None	30,237	66–59
126	August 25	Giants	2–3	Scott Garrelts (11–7)	**Kevin Gross** (8–11)	None	28,841	66–60
127	August 26	Giants	0–2	Don Robinson (8–6)	**Shane Rawley** (16–6)	None	23,776	66–61
128	August 28	@ Padres	8–1	**Don Carman** (8–9)	Ed Whitson (10–9)	None	12,711	67–61
129	August 29	@ Padres	1–3	Eric Nolte (2–2)	**Bruce Ruffin** (10–11)	None	12,492	67–62
130	August 30	@ Padres	1–6	Mark Grant (5–7)	**Kevin Gross** (8–12)	None	12,072	67–63
131	August 31	@ Dodgers	4–2	**Shane Rawley** (17–6)	Bob Welch (11–9)	**Steve Bedrosian** (34)	38,104	68–63

September (12–16)

#	Date	Opponent	Score	Win	Loss	Save	Attendance	Record
132	September 1	@ Dodgers	7–5	**Wally Ritchie** (3–1)	Tim Leary (3–11)	**Steve Bedrosian** (35)	23,074	69–63
133	September 2	@ Dodgers	6–2	**Don Carman** (9–9)	Orel Hershiser (13–13)	None	19,958	70–63
134	September 4	@ Giants	2–3 (10)	Don Robinson (9–6)	**Wally Ritchie** (3–2)	None	16,644	70–64
135	September 5	@ Giants	3–6	Dave Dravecky (9–9)	**Shane Rawley** (17–7)	Kelly Downs (1)	22,694	70–65
136	September 6	@ Giants	1–4	Rick Reuschel (11–7)	**Freddie Toliver** (1–1)	None	40,768	70–66
137	September 7	@ Mets	5–3	**Don Carman** (10–9)	Dwight Gooden (13–5)	**Steve Bedrosian** (36)	45,699	71–66
138	September 8	@ Mets	2–5	Terry Leach (11–1)	**Bruce Ruffin** (10–12)	Doug Sisk (3)	17,518	71–67
139	September 9	@ Mets	5–11	Rick Aguilera (8–2)	**Shane Rawley** (17–8)	None	30,362	71–68
140	September 11	Pirates	2–4	Doug Drabek (8–11)	**Kevin Gross** (8–13)	Jim Gott (10)	20,085	71–69
141	September 12	Pirates	4–12	Mike Dunne (11–5)	**Don Carman** (10–10)	None	15,440	71–70
142	September 13	Pirates	1–6	Brian Fisher (9–9)	**Bruce Ruffin** (10–13)	None	12,610	71–71
143	September 14	Cardinals	3–2 (11)	**Jeff Calhoun** (2–1)	Ken Dayley (9–5)	None	20,749	72–71
144	September 15	Cardinals	3–4	Ricky Horton (7–3)	**Kevin Gross** (8–14)	Todd Worrell (29)	20,697	72–72
145	September 16	Cubs	8–5	**Mike Maddux** (2–0)	Lee Smith (4–10)	**Steve Bedrosian** (37)	17,598	73–72
146	September 17	Cubs	4–3	**Don Carman** (11–10)	Jamie Moyer (11–14)	**Steve Bedrosian** (38)	10,338	74–72
147	September 18	@ Expos	3–6	Bryn Smith (10–7)	**Bruce Ruffin** (10–14)	None	23,466	74–73
148	September 19	@ Expos	4–12	Dennis Martínez (10–3)	**Shane Rawley** (17–9)	Jeff Parrett (6)	33,072	74–74
149	September 20	@ Expos	4–1	**Kevin Gross** (9–14)	Neal Heaton (12–9)	**Steve Bedrosian** (39)	35,082	75–74
150	September 21	@ Cardinals	1–3	John Tudor (8–2)	**Don Carman** (11–11)	Todd Worrell (31)	38,396	75–75
151	September 22	@ Cardinals	2–3	Danny Cox (10–8)	**Shane Rawley** (17–10)	Todd Worrell (32)	42,725	75–76
152	September 23	@ Cubs	5–0	**Bruce Ruffin** (11–14)	Jamie Moyer (11–15)	None	7,160	76–76
153	September 24	@ Cubs	3–2 (11)	**Steve Bedrosian** (5–2)	Jay Baller (0–1)	None	6,904	77–76
154	September 25	Expos	4–2	**Don Carman** (12–11)	Neal Heaton (12–10)	**Steve Bedrosian** (40)	16,641	78–76
155	September 26	Expos	4–7	Pascual Pérez (6–0)	**Shane Rawley** (17–11)	Andy McGaffigan (11)	27,453	78–77
156	September 27	Expos	3–5	Jeff Parrett (6–5)	**Mike Jackson** (3–9)	Tim Burke (16)	33,662	78–78
157	September 28	Mets	0–1	John Candelaria (10–6)	**Kevin Gross** (9–15)	Randy Myers (6)	26,440	78–79
158	September 29	Mets	3–0	**Don Carman** (13–11)	David Cone (5–6)	None	30,799	79–79
159	September 30	Mets	4–3 (10)	**Jeff Calhoun** (3–1)	Jesse Orosco (3–9)	None	27,672	80–79

October (0–3)

#	Date	Opponent	Score	Win	Loss	Save	Attendance	Record
160	October 2	@ Pirates	4–6	Bob Walk (8–2)	**Mike Jackson** (3–10)	Jim Gott (13)	8,245	80–80
161	October 3	@ Pirates	5–10	Vicente Palacios (2–1)	**Kevin Gross** (9–16)	None	12,790	80–81
162	October 4	@ Pirates	2–4	Mike Dunne (13–6)	**Steve Bedrosian** (5–3)	Jeff Robinson (14)	26,734	80–82

=== Roster ===
1987 Philadelphia Phillies
**Roster**
**Pitchers**: 34 Doug Bair; 40 Steve Bedrosian; 31 Jeff Calhoun; 42 Don Carman; 39 Joe Cowley; 52 Todd Frohwirth; 46 Kevin Gross; 41 Tom Hume; 33 Mike Jackson; 44 Mike Maddux; 50 Tom Newell; 28 Shane Rawley; 38 Wally Ritchie; 47 Bruce Ruffin; 35,43 Dan Schatzeder; 27 Kent Tekulve; 43 Freddie Toliver	**Catchers**: 10 Darren Daulton; 13 Lance Parrish; **Infielders**: 16 Luis Aguayo; 37,7 Ken Dowell; 9 Von Hayes; 7 Ken Jackson; 45 Greg Jelks; 30 Steve Jeltz; 11 Greg Legg; 8 Juan Samuel; 20 Mike Schmidt; 15 Rick Schu	**Outfielders**: 34 Mike Easler; 21 Greg Gross; 19 Keith Hughes; 18 Chris James; 17 Ron Roenicke; 6 John Russell; 14 Jeff Stone; 24 Milt Thompson; 12 Glenn Wilson	**Manager**: 4 Lee Elia; 7 John Felske; **Coaches**: 2 Jim Davenport (Third Base); 4 Lee Elia (Bench); 3 Claude Osteen (Pitching); 5 Mike Ryan (Bullpen); 25 Del Unser (Hitting & First Base)

== Player stats ==
= Indicates team leader

= Indicates league leader

=== Batting ===
==== Starters by position ====
Note: Pos = Position; G = Games played; AB = At bats; H = Hits; Avg. = Batting average; HR = Home runs; RBI = Runs batted in

Pos	Player	G	AB	H	Avg.	HR	RBI
C	Lance Parrish	130	466	114	.245	17	67
1B	Von Hayes	158	556	154	.277	21	84
2B	Juan Samuel	160	655	178	.272	28	100
3B	Mike Schmidt	147	522	153	.293	35	113
SS	Steve Jeltz	114	293	68	.232	0	12
LF	Chris James	115	358	105	.293	17	54
CF	Milt Thompson	150	527	159	.302	7	43
RF	Glenn Wilson	154	569	150	.264	14	54

==== Other batters ====
Note: G = Games played; AB = At bats; H = Hits; Avg. = Batting average; HR = Home runs; RBI = Runs batted in

Player	G	AB	H	Avg.	HR	RBI
Luis Aguayo	94	209	43	.206	12	21
Rick Schu	92	196	46	.235	7	23
Greg Gross	114	133	38	.286	1	12
Darren Daulton	53	129	25	.194	3	13
Jeff Stone	66	125	32	.256	1	16
Mike Easler	33	110	31	.282	1	10
Ron Roenicke	63	78	13	.167	1	4
Keith Hughes	37	76	20	.263	0	10
John Russell	24	62	9	.145	3	8
Ken Dowell	15	39	5	.128	0	1
Ken Jackson	8	16	4	.250	0	2
Greg Jelks	10	11	1	.091	0	0
Greg Legg	3	2	0	.000	0	0

=== Pitching ===
==== Starting pitchers ====
Note: G = Games pitched; IP = Innings pitched; W = Wins; L = Losses; ERA = Earned run average; SO = Strikeouts

Player	G	IP	W	L	ERA	SO
Shane Rawley	36	229.2	17	11	4.39	123
Don Carman	35	211.0	13	11	4.22	125
Bruce Ruffin	35	204.2	11	14	2.35	93
Kevin Gross	34	200.2	9	16	4.35	110

==== Other pitchers ====
Note: G = Games pitched; IP = Innings pitched; W = Wins; L = Losses; ERA = Earned run average; SO = Strikeouts

Player	G	IP	W	L	ERA	SO
Tom Hume	38	70.2	1	4	5.60	29
Freddie Toliver	10	30.1	1	1	5.64	25
Mike Maddux	7	17.0	2	0	2.65	15
Joe Cowley	5	11.2	0	4	15.43	5

==== Relief pitchers ====
Note: G = Games pitched; W = Wins; L = Losses; SV = Saves; ERA = Earned run average; SO = Strikeouts

Player	G	W	L	SV	ERA	SO
Steve Bedrosian	65	5	3	40	2.83	74
Kent Tekulve	90	6	4	3	3.09	60
Mike Jackson	55	3	10	1	4.20	93
Wally Ritchie	49	3	2	3	3.75	45
Jeff Calhoun	42	3	1	1	1.48	31
Dan Schatzeder	26	3	1	0	4.06	28
Doug Bair	11	2	0	0	5.93	10
Todd Frohwirth	10	1	0	0	0.00	9
Tom Newell	2	0	0	0	36.00	1
Glenn Wilson	1	0	0	0	0.00	1

== Awards and honors ==
- Kent Tekulve, Single Season Franchise Record, Most Pitching appearances (90)

All-Star Game

- Mike Schmidt, Third Base, Starter
- Steve Bedrosian, Pitcher, Reserve
- Juan Samuel, Second Base, Reserve

== Farm system ==
Level	Team	League	Manager
AAA	Maine Guides	International League	Bill Dancy
AA	Reading Phillies	Eastern League	George Culver
A	Clearwater Phillies	Florida State League	Roly de Armas
A	Spartanburg Phillies	South Atlantic League	Ramón Avilés
A-Short Season	Utica Blue Sox	New York–Penn League	Tony Taylor
