= 1987 St. Louis Cardinals season =

Major League Baseball season

1987 St. Louis Cardinals
- National League champions National League East champions
- League: National League
- Division: East
- Ballpark: Busch Memorial Stadium
- City: St. Louis, Missouri
- Record: 95–67 (.586)
- Divisional place: 1st
- Owners: August "Gussie" Busch
- General managers: Dal Maxvill
- Managers: Whitey Herzog
- Television: KSDK (Jack Buck, Mike Shannon, Jay Randolph); Cardinal Cable Network (Al Hrabosky, Ken Wilson)
- Radio: KMOX (Jack Buck, Mike Shannon)

The 1987 St. Louis Cardinals season was the team's 106th season in St. Louis, Missouri and the 96th season in the National League. The Cardinals went 95–67 during the season and finished first in the National League East for the third and last time before moving to the National League Central in 1994. They went on to win the NLCS in seven games over the San Francisco Giants. In the World Series against the Minnesota Twins, after having fallen behind 2–0 at the Hubert H. Humphrey Metrodome, they won their next three games at home. However, back at the Metrodome, they lost the last two and fell one game short of a World Series title. It would be the Cardinals' last World Series appearance until 2004.

== Offseason ==
- October 31, 1986: Alan Knicely was released by the Cardinals.
- December 19, 1986: Bob Forsch was signed as a free agent by the Cardinals.
- January 26, 1987: Skeeter Barnes was signed as a free agent by the Cardinals.

== Regular season ==
September highlights included a Terry Pendleton home run during a September 11 game against the contending Mets as well as a Tom Herr walk-off grand slam against the Mets on Seat Cushion Night. As St. Louis proceeded into the post-season, they found themselves without clean-up hitter Jack Clark, the team's number-one offensive threat. He damaged his ankle when he caught a cleat in the artificial turf at Montreal's Olympic Stadium. Nonetheless, the Redbirds won 95 games to capture the NL East title.

=== Season standings ===
NL East
Team	W	L	Pct.	GB	Home	Road
St. Louis Cardinals	95	67	.586	—	49‍–‍32	46‍–‍35
New York Mets	92	70	.568	3	49‍–‍32	43‍–‍38
Montreal Expos	91	71	.562	4	48‍–‍33	43‍–‍38
Philadelphia Phillies	80	82	.494	15	43‍–‍38	37‍–‍44
Pittsburgh Pirates	80	82	.494	15	47‍–‍34	33‍–‍48
Chicago Cubs	76	85	.472	18½	40‍–‍40	36‍–‍45

=== Record vs. opponents ===
1987 National League record Sources:
Team	ATL	CHC	CIN	HOU	LAD	MON	NYM	PHI	PIT	SD	SF	STL
Atlanta	—	6–5	8–10	8–10	6–12	3–9	7–5	7–5	7–5	6–12	8–10	3–9
Chicago	5–6	—	6–6	8–4	6–6	10–8	9–9	8–10	4–14	9–3	5–7	6–12
Cincinnati	10–8	6–6	—	13–5	10–8	6–6	7–5	5–7	4–8	12–6	7–11	4–8
Houston	10–8	4–8	5–13	—	12–6	7–5	6–6	6–6	6–6	5–13	10–8	5–7
Los Angeles	12–6	6–6	8–10	6–12	—	3–9	6–6	2–10	6–6	11–7	10–8	3–9
Montreal	9–3	8–10	6–6	5–7	9–3	—	8–10	10–8	11–7	9–3	5–7	11–7
New York	5–7	9–9	5–7	6–6	6–6	10–8	—	13–5	12–6	8–4	9–3	9–9
Philadelphia	5–7	10–8	7–5	6–6	10–2	8–10	5–13	—	11–7	8–4	2–10	8–10
Pittsburgh	5–7	14–4	8–4	6–6	6–6	7–11	6–12	7–11	—	8–4	6–6	7–11
San Diego	12–6	3–9	6–12	13–5	7–11	3–9	4–8	4–8	4–8	—	5–13	4–8
San Francisco	10–8	7–5	11–7	8–10	8–10	7–5	3–9	10–2	6–6	13–5	—	7–5
St. Louis	9–3	12–6	8–4	7–5	9–3	7–11	9–9	10–8	11–7	8–4	5–7	—

=== Notable transactions ===
- April 1, 1987: Mike LaValliere, Mike Dunne and Andy Van Slyke were traded by the Cardinals to the Pittsburgh Pirates for Tony Peña.
- April 6, 1987: Lee Tunnell was purchased by the Cardinals from the Pittsburgh Pirates.
- June 2, 1987: Jeremy Hernandez was drafted by the Cardinals in the 2nd round of the 1987 Major League Baseball draft.
- July 16, 1987: Skeeter Barnes was purchased from the Cardinals by the Milwaukee Brewers.
- July 25, 1987: Joe Boever was traded by the Cardinals to the Atlanta Braves for Randy O'Neal.
- August 31, 1987: Pat Perry was traded to the Cincinnati Reds for a player to be named later. On September 3, 1987 the Cincinnati Reds sent Scott Terry to the St. Louis Cardinals to complete the deal.
- September 29, 1987: Doug DeCinces was signed as a free agent with the St. Louis Cardinals.

=== Roster ===
1987 St. Louis Cardinals
Roster
Pitchers: 40 Tim Conroy; 34 Danny Cox; 48 Bill Dawley; 46 Ken Dayley; 31 Bob Forsch; 49 Ricky Horton; 39 Dave LaPoint; 41 Joe Magrane; 53 Greg Mathews; 39 Randy O'Neal; 37 Pat Perry; 36 Steve Peters; 47 Ray Soff; 37 Scott Terry; 30 John Tudor; 42 Lee Tunnell; 38 Todd Worrell	Catchers: 25 Steve Lake; 19 Tom Pagnozzi; 26 Tony Peña; Infielders: 59 Skeeter Barnes; 5 Rod Booker; 22 Jack Clark; 10 Doug DeCinces; 23 Dan Driessen; 28 Tom Herr; 35 Mike Laga; 12 Tom Lawless; 9 Terry Pendleton; 1 Ozzie Smith	Outfielders: 29 Vince Coleman; 27 Curt Ford; 18 David Green; 21 Lance Johnson; 21 Tito Landrum; 15 Jim Lindeman; 51 Willie McGee; 33 John Morris; 11 Jose Oquendo	Manager: 24 Whitey Herzog; Coaches: 7 Rich Hacker (First base); 8 Johnny Lewis (Hitting); 16 Nick Leyva (Third base); 3 Dave Ricketts (Bullpen); 4 Mike Roarke (Pitching); 2 Red Schoendienst (Bench); 72 Kwang-hwan Lee (Guest Instructor)

== Player stats ==
=== Batting ===
==== Starters by position ====
Note: Pos = Position; G = Games played; AB = At bats; H = Hits; Avg. = Batting average; HR = Home runs; RBI = Runs batted in

Pos	Player	G	AB	H	Avg.	HR	RBI
C	Tony Peña	116	384	82	.214	5	44
1B	Jack Clark	131	419	120	.286	35	106
2B	Tom Herr	141	510	134	.263	2	83
3B	Terry Pendleton	159	583	167	.286	12	96
SS	Ozzie Smith	158	600	182	.303	0	75
LF	Vince Coleman	151	623	180	.289	3	43
CF	Willie McGee	153	620	177	.285	11	105
RF	Curt Ford	89	228	65	.285	3	26

==== Other batters ====
Note: G = Games played; AB = At bats; H = Hits; Avg. = Batting average; HR = Home runs; RBI = Runs batted in

Player	G	AB	H	Avg.	HR	RBI
José Oquendo	116	248	71	.286	1	24
Jim Lindeman	75	207	43	.208	8	28
Steve Lake	74	179	45	.251	2	19
John Morris	101	157	41	.261	3	23
Dan Driessen	24	60	14	.233	1	11
Lance Johnson	63	59	13	.220	0	7
Tito Landrum	30	50	10	.200	0	6
Tom Pagnozzi	27	48	9	.188	2	9
Rod Booker	44	47	13	.277	0	8
David Green	14	30	8	.267	1	1
Mike Laga	17	29	4	.138	1	4
Tom Lawless	19	25	2	.080	0	0
Doug DeCinces	4	9	2	.222	0	1
Skeeter Barnes	4	4	1	.250	1	3

=== Pitching ===
==== Starting pitchers ====
Note: G = Games pitched; IP = Innings pitched; W = Wins; L = Losses; ERA = Earned run average; SO = Strikeouts

Player	G	IP	W	L	ERA	SO
Danny Cox	31	199.1	11	9	3.88	101
Greg Mathews	32	197.2	11	11	3.73	108
Bob Forsch	33	179.0	11	7	4.32	89
Joe Magrane	27	170.1	9	7	3.54	101
John Tudor	16	96.0	10	2	3.84	54

==== Other pitchers ====
Note: G = Games pitched; IP = Innings pitched; W = Wins; L = Losses; ERA = Earned run average; SO = Strikeouts

Player	G	IP	W	L	ERA	SO
Ricky Horton	67	125.0	8	3	3.82	55
Lee Tunnell	32	74.1	4	4	4.84	49
Tim Conroy	10	40.2	3	2	5.53	22
Dave LaPoint	6	16.0	1	1	6.75	8

==== Relief pitchers ====
Note: G = Games pitched; W = Wins; L = Losses; SV = Saves; ERA = Earned run average; SO = Strikeouts

Player	G	W	L	SV	ERA	SO
Todd Worrell	75	8	6	33	2.66	92
Bill Dawley	60	5	8	2	4.47	65
Ken Dayley	53	9	5	4	2.66	63
Pat Perry	45	4	2	1	4.39	33
Ray Soff	12	1	0	0	6.46	9
Steve Peters	12	0	0	1	1.80	11
Scott Terry	11	0	0	0	3.38	9
Randy O'Neal	1	0	0	0	1.80	4
José Oquendo	1	0	0	0	27.00	0

== Postseason ==
=== NLCS ===
Despite the Cardinals prevailing over the San Francisco Giants in 7 games, it was the Giants' Jeffrey Leonard who won the NLCS MVP award.

==== Game 1 ====
October 6, Busch Stadium

Team	1	2	3	4	5	6	7	8	9	R	H	E
San Francisco	1	0	0	1	0	0	0	1	0	3	7	0
St. Louis	0	0	1	1	0	3	0	0	X	5	10	1
W: Greg Mathews (1-0) L: Rick Reuschel (0-1) SV: Ken Dayley (1)
HRs: SFG – Jeffrey Leonard (1) STL – None

==== Game 2 ====
October 7, Busch Stadium

Team	1	2	3	4	5	6	7	8	9	R	H	E
San Francisco	0	2	0	1	0	0	0	2	0	5	10	0
St. Louis	0	0	0	0	0	0	0	0	0	0	2	1
W: Dave Dravecky (1-0) L: John Tudor (0-1) SV: None
HRs: SFG – Will Clark (1) Jeffrey Leonard (2) STL – None

==== Game 3 ====
October 9, Candlestick Park

Team	1	2	3	4	5	6	7	8	9	R	H	E
St. Louis	0	0	0	0	0	2	4	0	0	6	11	1
San Francisco	0	3	1	0	0	0	0	0	1	5	7	1
W: Bob Forsch (1-0) L: Don Robinson (0-1) SV: Todd Worrell (1)
HRs: SFG – Jeffrey Leonard (3) Harry Spilman (1) STL – Jim Lindeman (1)

==== Game 4 ====
October 10, Candlestick Park

Team	1	2	3	4	5	6	7	8	9	R	H	E
St. Louis	0	2	0	0	0	0	0	0	0	2	9	0
San Francisco	0	0	0	1	2	0	0	1	X	4	9	2
W: Mike Krukow (1-0) L: Danny Cox (0-1) SV: None
HRs: SFG – Robby Thompson (1) Jeffrey Leonard (4) STL – None

==== Game 5 ====
October 11, Candlestick Park

Team	1	2	3	4	5	6	7	8	9	R	H	E
St. Louis	1	0	1	1	0	0	0	0	0	3	7	0
San Francisco	1	0	1	4	0	0	0	0	X	6	7	1
W: Joe Price (1-0) L: Bob Forsch (1-1) SV: None
HRs: SFG – Kevin Mitchell (1) STL – None

==== Game 6 ====
October 13, Busch Stadium

Team	1	2	3	4	5	6	7	8	9	R	H	E
San Francisco	0	0	0	0	0	0	0	0	0	0	6	0
St. Louis	0	1	0	0	0	0	0	0	X	1	5	0
W: John Tudor (1-1) L: Dave Dravecky (1-1) SV: Ken Dayley (2)
HRs: SFG – None STL – None

==== Game 7 ====
October 14, Busch Stadium

Team	1	2	3	4	5	6	7	8	9	R	H	E
San Francisco	0	0	0	0	0	0	0	0	0	0	8	1
St. Louis	0	4	0	0	0	2	0	0	X	6	12	0
W: Danny Cox (1-1) L: Atlee Hammaker (0-1) SV: None
HRs: SFG – None STL – José Oquendo (1)

=== World Series ===
The Minnesota Twins defeated the Cardinals in seven games. This Series was the first in which the home team won each of the seven games. The Cardinals held their own at Busch Stadium, but the crowd noise and the "Homer Hankys" in the Metrodome appeared to give the Twins an edge. The booming bats of the Twins were too much for the Cardinals' "inside baseball" style of offense in Games 1, 2, and 6. In Game 7 it was the Twins' pitching that shut down the Cardinals.

AL Minnesota Twins (4) vs. NL St. Louis Cardinals (3)

Game	Score	Date	Location	Attendance	Time of Game
1	Cardinals – 1, Twins – 10	October 17	Hubert H. Humphrey Metrodome (Minnesota)	55,171	3:36
2	Cardinals – 4, Twins – 8	October 18	Hubert H. Humphrey Metrodome (Minnesota)	55,257	2:42
3	Twins – 1, Cardinals – 3	October 20	Busch Stadium (St. Louis)	55,347	2:45
4	Twins – 2, Cardinals – 7	October 21	Busch Stadium (St. Louis)	55,347	3:11
5	Twins – 2, Cardinals – 4	October 22	Busch Stadium (St. Louis)	55,347	3:21
6	Cardinals – 5, Twins – 11	October 24	Hubert H. Humphrey Metrodome (Minnesota)	55,293	3:22
7	Cardinals – 2, Twins – 4	October 25	Hubert H. Humphrey Metrodome (Minnesota)	55,376	3:04

== Awards and honors ==
- Terry Pendleton, Third Base, National League Gold Glove
- Ozzie Smith, Shortstop, National League Gold Glove, Silver Slugger
- Jack Clark, First Base, National League Silver Slugger

== Farm system ==
Level	Team	League	Manager
AAA	Louisville Redbirds	American Association	Mike Jorgensen
AA	Arkansas Travelers	Texas League	Jim Riggleman
A	St. Petersburg Cardinals	Florida State League	Dave Bialas
A	Springfield Cardinals	Midwest League	Gaylen Pitts
A	Savannah Cardinals	South Atlantic League	Mark DeJohn
A-Short Season	Erie Cardinals	New York–Penn League	Joe Rigoli
Rookie	Johnson City Cardinals	Appalachian League	Dan Radison
