= 1987 Major League Baseball postseason =

1987 Major League Baseball playoffs

Tournament details
- Dates: October 6–25, 1987
- Teams: 4

Final positions
- Champions: Minnesota Twins (2nd title)
- Runners-up: St. Louis Cardinals

Tournament statistics
- Games played: 19
- Attendance: 983,453 (51,761 per game)
- Most HRs: Jeffrey Leonard (SF) (4)
- Most SBs: Vince Coleman (STL) (7)
- Most Ks (as pitcher): Frank Viola (MIN) (25)

Awards
- MVP: Frank Viola (MIN)

The 1987 Major League Baseball postseason was the playoff tournament of Major League Baseball for the 1987 season. The winners of each division advanced to the postseason and faced each other in a League Championship Series to determine the pennant winners that faced each other in the World Series.

In the American League, the Detroit Tigers were making their second appearance in the past five years, and the Minnesota Twins ended nearly two decades of futility by clinching their first postseason berth since 1970. This would be Detroit's last postseason appearance until 2006.

In the National League, the San Francisco Giants returned to the postseason for the first time since 1971, and the St. Louis Cardinals were making their third appearance in the last six years. This would be the last postseason appearance for the Cardinals until 1996.

The playoffs began on October 6, 1987, and concluded on October 25, 1987, with the Twins defeating the Cardinals in seven games in the 1987 World Series. It was the Twins' first title in Minnesota and their first since 1924, when they were known as the Washington Senators.

== Playoff seeds ==
American League Teams National League Teams

The following teams qualified for the postseason:

=== American League ===
- Detroit Tigers – 98–64, AL East champions
- Minnesota Twins – 85–77, AL West champions

=== National League ===
- St. Louis Cardinals – 95–67, NL East champions
- San Francisco Giants – 90–72, NL West champions

== Playoff bracket ==
League Championship Series (ALCS, NLCS)
East	Detroit	1
West	Minnesota	4
East	St. Louis	4
West	San Francisco	3

World Series
AL	Minnesota	4
NL	St. Louis	3

== American League Championship Series ==
=== Minnesota Twins vs. Detroit Tigers ===
Minnesota won the series, 4–1.

Game	Date	Score	Location	Time	Attendance
1	October 7	Detroit Tigers – 5, Minnesota Twins – 8	Hubert H. Humphrey Metrodome	2:46	53,269
2	October 8	Detroit Tigers – 3, Minnesota Twins – 6	Hubert H. Humphrey Metrodome	2:54	55,245
3	October 10	Minnesota Twins – 6, Detroit Tigers – 7	Tiger Stadium	3:29	49,730
4	October 11	Minnesota Twins – 5, Detroit Tigers – 3	Tiger Stadium	3:24	51,939
5	October 12	Minnesota Twins – 9, Detroit Tigers – 5	Tiger Stadium	3:14	47,448

In an unexpected outcome, the Twins shockingly upset the heavily favored Tigers in five games, returning to the World Series for the first time since 1965 (in the process denying a rematch of the 1968 World Series between the Tigers and Cardinals).

Gary Gaetti helped lead the Twins to victory in Game 1 with two home runs. Bert Blyleven pitched seven solid innings and the Twins’ offense gave Tigers’ ace Jack Morris trouble on the mound as the Twins took a 2–0 series lead headed to Detroit. In Game 3, the Tigers were in danger of falling behind 3–0 in the series, but were bailed out by a two-run homer from Pat Sheridan in the bottom of the eighth, which got the Tigers on the board in the series. Home runs from Kirby Puckett and Greg Gagne would contribute to a 5-3 Twins’ victory in Game 4, giving them a 3–1 series lead. Blyleven pitched six solid innings in Game 5 as the Twins clinched the pennant by four runs. Game 5 was the last postseason game ever played at Tiger Stadium, and was also the final postseason game for Tigers’ manager Sparky Anderson. This was the Twins’ first postseason series win since the 1924 World Series, when the team was still the Washington Senators.

The Tigers would eventually win the pennant again in their next postseason appearance in 2006, where they swept the Oakland Athletics before coming up short in the World Series.

The Twins would win their next and most recent pennant four years later over the Toronto Blue Jays in five games en route to their most recent World Series title.

== National League Championship Series ==
=== St. Louis Cardinals vs. San Francisco Giants ===
St. Louis won the series, 4–3.

Game	Date	Score	Location	Time	Attendance
1	October 6	San Francisco Giants – 3, St. Louis Cardinals – 5	Busch Stadium (II)	2:34	55,331
2	October 7	San Francisco Giants – 5, St. Louis Cardinals – 0	Busch Stadium (II)	2:33	55,331
3	October 9	St. Louis Cardinals – 6, San Francisco Giants – 5	Candlestick Park	3:27	57,913
4	October 10	St. Louis Cardinals – 2, San Francisco Giants – 4	Candlestick Park	2:23	57,997
5	October 11	St. Louis Cardinals – 3, San Francisco Giants – 6	Candlestick Park	2:48	59,363
6	October 13	San Francisco Giants – 0, St. Louis Cardinals – 1	Busch Stadium (II)	3:09	55,331
7	October 14	San Francisco Giants – 0, St. Louis Cardinals – 6	Busch Stadium (II)	2:59	55,331

This was the first postseason meeting between the Cardinals and Giants. The Cardinals edged out the Giants in seven games, capped off by two shutouts in Games 6 and 7, to reach their third World Series in the last six years (in the process denying a rematch of the 1933 World Series between the Giants and Twins (who were then known as the Washington Senators)).

Greg Mathews pitched seven solid innings as the Cardinals took Game 1 by two runs. In Game 2, Dave Dravecky pitched a two-hit complete-game shutout as the Giants won 5–0 to even the series. In San Francisco for Game 3, the Giants had a 4–0 lead after five innings of play, but the Cardinals came back to win, going on a 6–1 run over the course of the last four innings to win and take a 2–1 series lead. In Game 4, Mike Krukow pitched another complete game for the Giants as they won 4–2 to even the series. In Game 5, the Cardinals led 3–2 after the top of the fourth, but a two-run RBI single by José Uribe put the Giants ahead for good as they ultimately put up four unanswered runs in the bottom of the fourth to take a 3–2 series lead heading back to St. Louis. John Tudor pitched eight shutout innings as the Cardinals won 1–0 to force a seventh game. Danny Cox pitched an eight-hit complete game shutout for the Cardinals as they won Game 7, 6–0, to secure the pennant.

The Cardinals would return to the NLCS in 1996, but fell to the Atlanta Braves in seven games after leading the series 3–1. They would win their next pennant in 2004 over the Houston Astros in seven games after being ten outs away from elimination in Game 7, but they would fall in the World Series again.

The Giants would return to the NLCS two years later, and defeated the Chicago Cubs in five games for the pennant before falling in the World Series.

The Cardinals and Giants would play each other three more times in the NLCS, in 2002, 2012, and 2014, with the Giants winning all three meetings.

== 1987 World Series ==
=== Minnesota Twins (AL) vs. St. Louis Cardinals (NL) ===
Minnesota won the series, 4–3.

Game	Date	Score	Location	Time	Attendance
1	October 17	St. Louis Cardinals – 1, Minnesota Twins – 10	Hubert H. Humphrey Metrodome	2:39	55,171
2	October 18	St. Louis Cardinals – 4, Minnesota Twins – 8	Hubert H. Humphrey Metrodome	2:42	55,257
3	October 20	Minnesota Twins – 1, St. Louis Cardinals – 3	Busch Stadium	2:45	55,347
4	October 21	Minnesota Twins – 2, St. Louis Cardinals – 7	Busch Stadium	3:11	55,347
5	October 22	Minnesota Twins – 2, St. Louis Cardinals – 4	Busch Stadium	3:21	55,347
6	October 24	St. Louis Cardinals – 5, Minnesota Twins – 11	Hubert H. Humphrey Metrodome	3:04	55,293
7	October 25	St. Louis Cardinals – 2, Minnesota Twins – 4	Hubert H. Humphrey Metrodome	3:04	55,376

This was the first World Series to feature games played indoors. It was also the third consecutive World Series to go the full seven games. In the first World Series in which neither team won a road game, the Twins edged out the Cardinals in seven games to win their first title since 1924 (when the team was still known as the Washington Senators), ending a 63-year title drought - the third longest drought in the majors at that time.

In Game 1, Frank Viola pitched a complete game as the Twins blew out the Cardinals. Game 1 was the loudest game in World Series history, as crowd noise reached 125 decibels SPL, which is the equivalent of a jet plane during takeoff. The Twins held off a late comeback by the Cardinals as they won Game 2 to go up 2–0 in the series headed to St. Louis. In Game 3, the Cardinals overcame a late Twins lead to win 3–1, with John Tudor pitching eight solid innings for the win. The Cardinals then blew out the Twins in Game 4 to even the series. Todd Worrell held off a late rally by the Twins in Game 5 as the Cardinals won, 4–2, now one win away from their second title in five years. The Cardinals tied a World Series record for stolen bases with five in Game 5, matching the 1907 Chicago Cubs. The Cardinals' lead would not hold as the series shifted back to Minneapolis, however. The Twins blew out the Cardinals in Game 6 to force a seventh game. Game 6 was the last World Series game to be played during daytime. Viola pitched eight solid innings in Game 7 as the Twins came back to win by a 4–2 score, securing the title.

With the Twins winning Game 7 in the regulation nine innings, the 1987 World Series was the first in which no games needed the bottom of the ninth inning. No other World Series since then has had that happen, as the two other Fall Classics in which the home team won every game—1991 and 2001—both included extra inning games and walk-off wins in the bottom of the ninth. This was the first major professional sports championship won by a Minneapolis-St. Paul-based team since 1954, when the then-Minneapolis Lakers completed the NBA’s first three-peat before their move to Los Angeles. The Twins would return to the World Series four years later, and defeated the Atlanta Braves in seven games for their most recent championship.

The Cardinals would eventually return to the World Series in 2004, but were swept by the Boston Red Sox, who won their first title in 86 years. They would eventually win their next championship in 2006 over the Detroit Tigers in five games.

== Broadcasting ==
NBC televised both LCS nationally in the United States. ABC then aired the World Series.
