= Tom Newell =

Tom Newell may refer to:

- Tom Newell (basketball), American former professional basketball coach
- Tom Newell (baseball) (born 1963), former Major League Baseball pitcher
- Tom Newell (politician) (born 1968), American politician in the Oklahoma House of Representatives
