= Keith Hughes (baseball) =

American baseball player (born 1963)

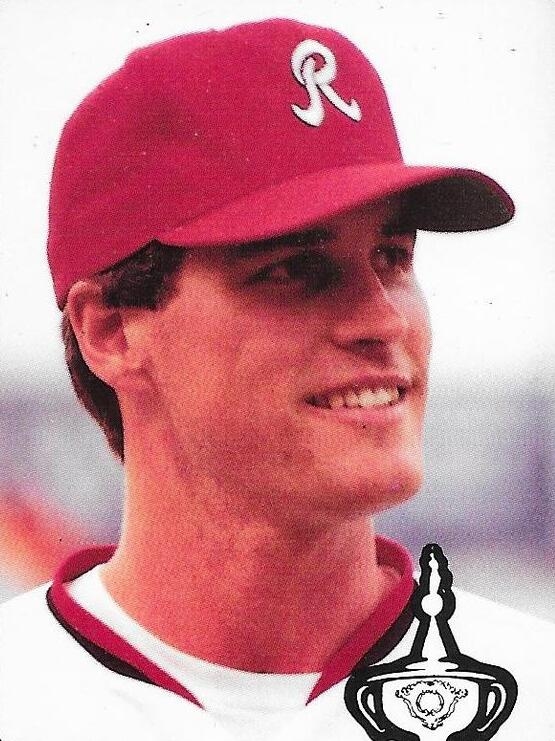
- Hughes with the Rochester Red Wings c. 1988
- Outfielder
- Born: September 12, 1963 (age 61); Bryn Mawr, Pennsylvania, U.S.
- Batted: Left Threw: Left

MLB debut
- May 19, 1987, for the New York Yankees

Last MLB appearance
- May 20, 1993, for the Cincinnati Reds

MLB statistics
- Batting average: .204
- Home runs: 2
- Runs batted in: 24
- Stats at Baseball Reference

Teams
- New York Yankees (1987); Philadelphia Phillies (1987); Baltimore Orioles (1988); New York Mets (1990); Cincinnati Reds (1993)

Keith Wills Hughes (born September 12, 1963) is an American former Major League Baseball player who played for five teams in his major league career which lasted for parts of four seasons.

== Early career ==
Keith attended Conestoga High School in Berwyn, Pennsylvania. He was signed as an undrafted free agent by the Philadelphia Phillies in 1981.

== Major League career ==
He made his Major League debut on May 19, 1987 with the New York Yankees. Then the Yankees traded him and Shane Turner to the Philadelphia Phillies for Mike Easler where he finished his rookie season. The following season he was traded with Rick Schu and Jeff Stone to the Baltimore Orioles for Frank Bellino and Mike Young. He played in 41 games with the Orioles that year, and didn't play in the majors in 1989. In December of that year he was traded again. This time the Orioles traded him with Cesar Mejia to the New York Mets for John Mitchell and Joaquin Contreras. He played in 8 games with the Mets in 1990 and he did not come back to the majors until 1993 when the Cincinnati Reds brought him up for 3 games.

In the Puerto Rican Winter League in the 1987–1988 season he hit a grand slam after Indios de Mayagüez were down by 3 in the bottom of the 10th to give the championship to Mayagüez.
