= Mike Easler =

American baseball player (born 1950)

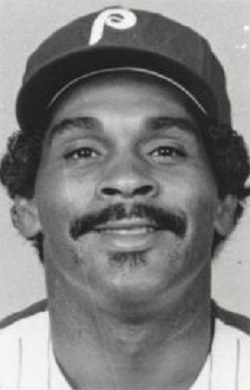
- Left fielder / Designated hitter
- Born: November 29, 1950 (age 75); Cleveland, Ohio, U.S.
- Batted: Left Threw: Right

Professional debut
- MLB: September 5, 1973, for the Houston Astros
- NPB: May 19, 1988, for the Nippon-Ham Fighters

Last appearance
- MLB: October 4, 1987, for the New York Yankees
- NPB: August 31, 1989, for the Nippon-Ham Fighters

MLB statistics
- Batting average: .293
- Home runs: 118
- Runs batted in: 522

NPB statistics
- Batting average: .302
- Home runs: 26
- Runs batted in: 90
- Stats at Baseball Reference

Teams
- As player: Houston Astros (1973–1975); California Angels (1976); Pittsburgh Pirates (1977, 1979–1983); Boston Red Sox (1984–1985); New York Yankees (1986); Philadelphia Phillies (1987); New York Yankees (1987); Nippon-Ham Fighters (1988–1989); As coach: Milwaukee Brewers (1992); Boston Red Sox (1993–1994); St. Louis Cardinals (1999–2001); Los Angeles Dodgers (2008)

Career highlights and awards
- All-Star (1981); World Series champion (1979)

Michael Anthony Easler (born November 29, 1950), nicknamed "the Hit Man", is an American former professional baseball outfielder, designated hitter, and coach, who played in Major League Baseball (MLB) for the Houston Astros, California Angels, Pittsburgh Pirates, Boston Red Sox, New York Yankees, and Philadelphia Phillies, from 1973 to 1987.

== Playing career ==
Easler was selected in the 14th round (314th overall) of the 1969 MLB draft by the Houston Astros out of Benedictine High School in Cleveland, Ohio. He played in the Astros' minor league system from 1969 through 1975, both before and after his major league debut. Easler played for the rookie league Covington Astros (1969), Single-A Cocoa Astros (1970–1971), Double-A Columbus Astros (1972–1973), Triple-A Denver Bears (1973–1974), and Triple-A Iowa Oaks (1975).

=== Houston Astros ===
Easler made his major league debut on September 5, 1973, pinch hitting (and grounding out) in the 11th inning of an Astros 9–3 loss to the Cincinnati Reds. Easler appeared in a total of six games with the Astros that season, going hitless in seven at bats. He appeared in 15 games in 1974 (batting 1-for-15), and 5 games in 1975 (batting 0-for-5). In June 1975, the Astros traded Easler to the St. Louis Cardinals; Easler had appeared in a total of 26 games for Houston, batting just 1-for-27 (.037).

Easler spent the remainder of the 1975 season and most of the 1976 season with the Cardinals' Triple-A farm team, the Tulsa Oilers; he did not appear in an MLB game with the Cardinals. In September 1976, the Cardinals traded Easler to the California Angels.

=== California Angels ===
During the 1976 season, Easler played in 21 games for the Angels, all in September, batting 13-for-54 (.241). In April 1977, the Angels traded Easler to the Pittsburgh Pirates.

=== Pittsburgh Pirates ===
Easler spent most of 1977 with the Pirates' Triple-A team, the Columbus Clippers. Late in the 1977 season, Easler played ten games with the Pirates, batting 8-for-18 (.444). After spending all of the 1978 season with the Clippers, Easler's contract was sold to the Boston Red Sox by the Pirates; however, in March 1979, Easler was traded back to the Pirates.

During the 1979 season, Easler appeared in 55 games for the Pirates, mostly as a pinch hitter, batting 15-for-54 (.278). He made one pinch hitting appearance in the 1979 NLCS (he flied out) and two pinch hitting appearances in the 1979 World Series (he walked once, and flied out), as the Pirates defeated the Baltimore Orioles in seven games.

Although he had earned a World Series ring, from 1973 through the end of the 1979 season, Easler had played a total of just 112 regular season MLB games, batting .242 with three home runs and 20 RBIs.

Easler's playing time changed significantly in 1980, when he played 132 games, mainly as the Pirates' regular left fielder. He batted .338 with 21 home runs and 74 RBIs. He hit for the cycle on June 12, 1980, in a 10–6 win over the Cincinnati Reds. In the strike shortened 1981 season, Easler played in 95 games, batting .286 with 7 home runs and 42 RBIs. Easler was selected to the 1981 All-Star Game; he entered the game in sixth inning, and had a walk and a run scored in two plate appearances, as the National League won, 5–4.

Easler continued as the Pirates' regular left fielder in 1982 (142 games, batting .276 with 15 home runs and 58 RBIs) and 1983 (115 games, batting .307 with 10 home runs at 54 RBIs). After the 1983 season, the Pirates traded Easler to the Red Sox for pitcher John Tudor. In his six seasons with the Pirates, Easler appeared in 549 games, batting .302 with 56 home runs and 244 RBIs.

=== Boston Red Sox ===
Easler was Boston's primary designated hitter for two years. In 1984, he batted .313 with 27 home runs and 91 RBIs in 156 games. In 1985, he played in 155 games, batting .262 with 16 home runs and 74 RBIs. Before the start of the 1986 season, Boston traded Easler to the New York Yankees for Don Baylor.

=== New York Yankees ===
Easler spent the 1986 season with the Yankees, as a designated hitter and corner outfielder. He appeared in 146 games, batting .302 with 14 home runs and 78 RBIs. On December 11, 1986, the Yankees traded Easler and Tom Barrett to the Philadelphia Phillies for Charles Hudson and Jeff Knox.

=== Philadelphia Phillies ===
Easler started in left field on opening day for the Phillies and appeared in 33 games and batting .282 with one home run and ten RBIs. On June 10, he was traded back to the Yankees as he never got completely comfortable with playing the field every day instead of being a DH. This time the Yankees sent Keith Hughes and Shane Turner to Philadelphia.

=== Second stint with the Yankees ===
He returned to the Yankees the same day he was traded and got a pinch hit in his first AB back in a loss to Toronto. He appeared in 65 games for the club while batting .281 with 4 home runs and 21 RBIs. In his last career plate appearance, he got a pinch hit single in a loss to the Orioles in a game started by Hudson whom he was traded for less than a year earlier.

=== Late career ===
Easler started the 1988 season with the Texas Rangers' Triple-A team, the Oklahoma City 89ers. He played just two games with the team, batting 5-for-7 (.714). Easler then spent the rest of the 1988 season, and the 1989 season, with the Nippon-Ham Fighters of Nippon Professional Baseball. He played a total of 142 games for the Fighters, batting .302 with 26 home runs and 90 RBIs.

Easler finished his playing career with the West Palm Beach Tropics during the Senior Professional Baseball Association's inaugural season (October 1989–February 1990).

=== Career statistics ===
In 1151 games over 14 seasons, Easler posted a .293 batting average (1078-for-3677) with 465 runs, 189 doubles, 25 triples, 118 home runs, 522 RBI, 321 bases on balls, .349 on-base percentage and .454 slugging percentage. Defensively, he recorded an overall .974 fielding percentage. He played 480 games in left field, 434 games as designated hitter, 81 games in right field, and 29 games at first base, along with 189 pinch-hitting appearances.

== Post-playing career ==
After his retirement, Easler managed the unaffiliated Miami Miracle of the Florida State League in 1990. He was the hitting coach for the Milwaukee Brewers in 1992, the Boston Red Sox in 1993, and the St. Louis Cardinals from 1999 to 2001. Easler returned to the minor leagues in 2004, managing the Florence Freedom of the independent Frontier League for part of the season.

Easler was the hitting coach for the Double-A Jacksonville Suns in 2006, and the Triple-A Las Vegas 51s in 2007, both then-farm teams of the Los Angeles Dodgers. On January 22, 2008, Don Mattingly, who had been announced as Joe Torre's hitting coach for the Dodgers, chose not to take the position citing personal reasons; the team then named Easler as the new hitting coach on Torre's staff. Easler was dismissed as the Dodgers' hitting coach on July 9, when it was announced that Mattingly would be returning to his role after dealing with his personal situation. Easler worked as a minor league hitting instructor for the remainder of the season and then left the organization, confirmed by agent Burton Rocks.

In 2011, Easler served as hitting coach of the Triple-A Buffalo Bisons in the New York Mets' organization.

Easler is an ordained Baptist minister.

== See also ==
- List of Major League Baseball players to hit for the cycle
- List of St. Louis Cardinals coaches

Achievements
Preceded by Fred Lynn	Hitting for the cycle June 12, 1980	Succeeded by Gary Ward
Sporting positions
Preceded by Rick Burleson	Boston Red Sox Hitting Coach; 1993–1994	Succeeded by Jim Rice
Preceded by Dave Parker	St. Louis Cardinals Hitting Coach; 1999–2001	Succeeded by Mitchell Page
Preceded by Bill Mueller	Los Angeles Dodgers Hitting Coach; 2008	Succeeded by Don Mattingly
