= Ken Dowell =

American baseball player (born 1961)

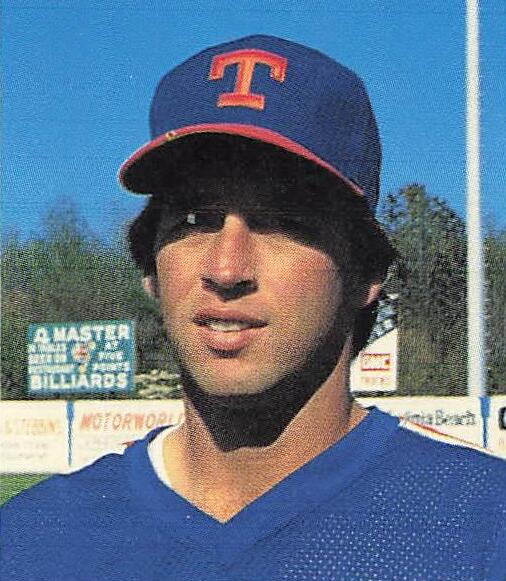
- Dowell with the Tidewater Tides c. 1988
- Shortstop
- Born: January 19, 1961 (age 65); Sacramento, California
- Batted: Right Threw: Right

MLB debut
- June 24, 1987, for the Philadelphia Phillies

Last MLB appearance
- July 19, 1987, for the Philadelphia Phillies

MLB statistics
- Batting average: .128
- Runs: 4
- Runs batted in: 1
- Stats at Baseball Reference

Teams
- Philadelphia Phillies (1987)

Kenneth Allen Dowell (born January 19, 1961) is an American former professional baseball shortstop. He played in Major League Baseball (MLB) for the 1987 Philadelphia Phillies,

A native of Sacramento, California, where he played for McClatchy high school and Sacramento City College, Dowell batted and threw right-handed. After being released by the Phillies on November 6, 1987, he continued his Minor League Baseball (MiLB) career, playing for three additional seasons, with the New York Mets’ and Atlanta Braves’ Triple-A affiliates.

== Teams ==
- Helena Phillies 1980
- Spartanburg Traders 1981
- Peninsula Pilots 1982
- Reading Phillies 1983
- Portland Beavers 1984-1986
- Maine Guides 1987
- Philadelphia Phillies 1987
- Tidewater Tides 1988-1989
- Richmond Braves 1990
