= Lee Elia =

American baseball player and manager (1937–2025)

- Shortstop
- Born: July 16, 1937; Philadelphia, Pennsylvania, U.S.
- Died: July 9, 2025 (aged 87); Odessa, Florida, U.S.
- Batted: Right Threw: Right

MLB debut
- April 23, 1966, for the Chicago White Sox

Last MLB appearance
- September 13, 1968, for the Chicago Cubs

MLB statistics
- Batting average: .203
- Home runs: 3
- Runs batted in: 25
- Managerial record: 238–300
- Winning %: .442
- Stats at Baseball Reference
- Managerial record at Baseball Reference

Teams
- As player: Chicago White Sox (1966); Chicago Cubs (1968); As manager: Chicago Cubs (1982–1983); Philadelphia Phillies (1987–1988); As coach: Philadelphia Phillies (1980–1981); Philadelphia Phillies (1984–1987); New York Yankees (1989); Seattle Mariners (1993–1997); Toronto Blue Jays (2000); Seattle Mariners (2001–2002); Tampa Bay Devil Rays (2003–2005); Baltimore Orioles (2006); Seattle Mariners (2008)

Career highlights and awards
- World Series champion (1980)

Lee Constantine Elia (/ˈiːliə/; July 16, 1937 – July 9, 2025) was an American professional baseball infielder, manager, and coach in Major League Baseball (MLB). After being drafted by his hometown Philadelphia Phillies, Elia spent seven years in the minor leagues, playing a mixture of shortstop and third base, before reaching the majors with the Chicago White Sox in 1966 and the Chicago Cubs in 1968. His playing career was cut short by knee injuries.

Elia moved into coaching and management after his playing career concluded. After initially working alongside manager Jim Bunning, Elia moved into management himself, working his way up the Phillies' minor league system. He was named third base coach for the Phillies, and was part of the coaching staff that won the 1980 World Series. He took his first major league managerial role with the Cubs in 1982 as they looked to rebuild. His time in Chicago is particularly remembered for a profanity-laden tirade attacking the team's fans and local media in his second year at the helm; he lost his job later that season.

After returning to the Phillies organization in a variety of coaching roles, he was named manager of their major league team in 1987. He was fired after a losing season the following year. He returned to coaching roles thereafter, serving on the staffs of the Phillies, New York Yankees, Toronto Blue Jays, Tampa Bay Devil Rays, Baltimore Orioles, and Seattle Mariners. Later in life, Elia was a special assistant with the Los Angeles Dodgers and Atlanta Braves.

== Early life ==
Lee Constantine Elia was born on July 16, 1937, in Philadelphia, Pennsylvania, to Constantine and Florence (née Soulas) Elia. His father Connie Elia was born in Albania and emigrated to the United States in 1920, working as a supervisor for a food-service company for 30 years. Elia also had a younger sister, Diane.

As a youth, Elia played multiple sports. While attending Olney High School, he played quarterback and was named all-city for the football team, was the starting shortstop on the baseball team and played for the basketball team. He also played guard for a summer-league basketball team that included future NBA players Wilt Chamberlain and Ray Scott and future Philadelphia 76ers announcer Sonny Hill.

Offered football scholarships by more than 50 schools, Elia selected the University of Delaware. In his freshman year, he was the team's leading rusher and points scorer while playing halfback. He suffered a dislocated hip in the offseason and was unable to play in his sophomore year. That injury healed in time for the Fightin' Blue Hens' baseball season, and after spending the summer playing baseball in Nova Scotia, Elia settled on baseball as his future.

== Playing career ==
Elia's college and summer-league baseball performance attracted the attention of the Philadelphia Phillies, and he signed with them for a $21,000 signing bonus. He was assigned to the Elmira Pioneers of the Class D New York–Penn League for the 1959 season. Playing mostly as a shortstop, he batted .309 with an OPS of .858 across 98 games and earned an invitation to the Phillies' spring training, where he was praised by Phillies manager Eddie Sawyer as the "surprise player of spring". Elia was promoted to the Phillies' Single-A affiliate Williamsport Grays but suffered a knee injury. He played in 124 games, mostly at third base, but his batting average dropped to .233, with 59 runs batted in.

Elia played for the Double-A Chattanooga Lookouts in 1961, with whom his batting average improved to .266, but he hit only four home runs. He was promoted to Triple-A for 1962, where he would spend the next three years with the Buffalo Bisons and Arkansas Travelers. By 1964, his OPS had improved to .800, but he was not promoted to the major leagues by the Phillies. In the following offseason, Elia was traded to the Chicago White Sox along with Danny Cater in exchange for Ray Herbert and Jeoff Long. Elia was stunned by the trade as he had enjoyed a good relationship with the Phillies, although he later admitted that he had been "stagnant" in the organization. He was assigned to the Indianapolis Indians, Chicago's Triple-A affiliate, and hit a career-high 29 home runs and accumulated 75 RBIs. After starting 1966 with the Indians, he was promoted to the major leagues for the first time. He appeared in 80 games for the White Sox that year, mostly as a shortstop, hitting .205 with three home runs and 22 RBIs.

Although Elia started 1967 with the Indians in Triple-A, he was traded to the Chicago Cubs for Jim Stewart. Elia played the rest of the 1967 season in the minors after being assigned to the Tacoma Cubs. He finished with 14 home runs, 59 RBIs and a batting average of .267. He split 1968 between Triple-A Tacoma and the Cubs' major-league team. He appeared in just 15 games in the majors that year, hitting .176 with three RBIs, although one was a walk-off single in the 11th inning against the St. Louis Cardinals, a game that Elia described as "the most memorable game I've ever seen".

In 1969, Elia was traded to the New York Yankees and played 17 games with the Triple-A Syracuse Chiefs. A knee operation resulted in a three-year break from baseball, although Elia continued to play non-professionally in the semipro Penn-Del League.

== Coaching and managerial career ==
=== 1973–1981: Early roles ===
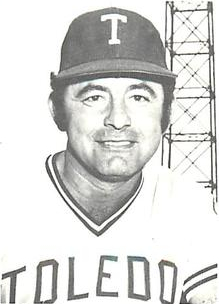
Elia (pictured) coaching the Toledo Mud Hens in 1975.

After spending three years out of professional baseball, when he had sold insurance, Elia was recruited to return as a player-coach for the Emeralds to support manager Jim Bunning. The Emeralds finished in last place in the West Division of the Pacific Coast League with a 64–79 record. The next season, the Phillies ended their association with the Emeralds, switching to the Toledo Mud Hens. Both Bunning and Elia were retained to lead the Mud Hens, who finished 70–74, third in the International League North Division.

In 1975, at the age of 37, Elia was offered his first position as a manager, leading the Spartanburg Phillies of the Class A Western Carolinas League (WCL). With the Phillies leading the league at the halfway mark, Elia was named as manager of the WCL's All-Star team, to play against the Carolina League's all-stars. The teams split the two-game series; the WCL won the first game 7–0, before losing the second, 2–1. Elia led the Phillies to a league-best 81–59 record, winning WCL Manager of the Year honors. The following season, the Phillies were not able to repeat, finishing with a 59–80 record, tied for last in the WCL.

Elia was promoted to the manage the Double-A Reading Phillies in the Eastern League for the 1977 season. With a roster that included future 1980 World Series champions Kevin Saucier and Keith Moreland, he managed his team to a 63–75 finish, finishing in third place in the Can-Am Division. In 1978, Reading had a winning record of 79–57, finishing in second place.

The Phillies named Elia manager of their Triple-A affiliate, the Oklahoma City 89ers, for the 1979 season. The 89ers finished with a 72–63 record, winning their first American Association West Division title. They played the Evansville Triplets in the championship series but lost in six games. After the season, the Philadelphia Phillies fired manager Danny Ozark, replacing him with Dallas Green, who hired Elia as third-base coach. They finished the season as NL East champions with a 91–71 record, one game ahead of the Montreal Expos, en route to winning the 1980 World Series.

In the strike-impacted 1981 season, the Phillies finished 59–48. In a split-season format, they won the NL East first half with a 34–21 record, granting them a playoff berth, but finished third in the second half with a record of 25–27. In the National League Division Series, they played the NL East second-half winners, the Montreal Expos, but lost in five games.

=== 1982–1983: Manager of the Chicago Cubs ===
After the 1981 season, Green left the Phillies to join the Chicago Cubs as their general manager so he could return to a front-office role. He brought Elia as the Cubs' manager and acquired Larry Bowa, Ryne Sandberg, Keith Moreland and Dickie Noles from the Phillies. With the Cubs having failed to win a National League pennant since 1945, Green and Elia implemented a new slogan, "Building a New Tradition". Green remarked the Cubs were looking to improve on the previous season, when they finished last in the NL.

During the first half of the 1982 season, while playing against the San Diego Padres, Elia got into an altercation with his first baseman, Bill Buckner on the field. After being hit by a pitch from Padres pitcher Tim Lollar, Buckner approached the Cubs' pitcher Dan Larson, who hit Tim Flannery with the next pitch. Elia accused Buckner of inciting retaliation, although Buckner denied this and stated it wasn't intentional. Buckner pulled himself out of the Cubs' lineup for two games, taking issue with how Elia had approached him, before they eventually settled their dispute. In June, the Cubs went on a 13-game losing streak, tying the franchise record set in 1944. The Cubs reached the All-Star break in last place in their division, with a 36–53 record. In the second half of the season, the Cubs were buoyed by 18 wins in August, including their first six-game winning streak for three years, which Elia described as his "high point", with "the best complement of hitting and pitching we've had". They went 37–36 in the second half, finishing the season with a 73–89 record, fifth in the NL East.

The following season, the Cubs began the season poorly; during a game against the Los Angeles Dodgers at Wrigley Field on April 29, 1983, a group of Cubs fans taunted their team's players, prompting Keith Moreland to try and climb onto the dugout to roof to reach them. After losing the game, the Cubs held the worst record in Major League Baseball, at 5–14. Elia lost his temper while speaking with reporters afterwards, delivering an infamous profanity-laden tirade regarding the Cubs' fans. Elia vented his feelings about Cubs fans in the stands who were booing and heckling Chicago:

I'll tell you one fuckin' thing—I hope we get fuckin' hotter than shit just to stuff it up them three thousand fuckin' people that show up every fuckin' day. Because if they're the real Chicago fuckin' fans, they can kiss my fuckin' ass, right Downtown, and print it! They're really, really behind you around here. My fuckin' ass! What ... what the fuck am I supposed to do? Go out there and let my fuckin' players get destroyed every day, and be quiet about it? For the fuckin' nickel/dime people that show up? The motherfuckers don't even work! That's why they're out at the fuckin' game! They ought to get a fuckin' job and find out what it's like to go out and earn a fuckin' living. Eighty-five percent of the fuckin' world is working. The other fifteen come out here. A fuckin' playground for the cocksuckers. Rip them motherfuckers! Rip those country cocksuckers, like the fuckin' players! We've got guys bustin' their fuckin' asses and those fuckin' people boo ... and that's the Cubs? My fuckin' ass! They talk about the great fuckin' support that the players get around here, I haven't seen it this fuckin' year!

Bowa later remarked that "what [Elia] did was stick up for his players. He'll always stick up for his players." Green considered firing Elia, and demanded that Elia apologize for his comments, which he did that evening. Elia's relationship with the Chicago fans and the press was damaged, while both Green and Bowa suggested that Elia stopped enforcing discipline as strongly in the team afterwards.

In August, the Cubs dropped a game 5–3 to the Atlanta Braves, with Gerald Perry hitting a home run and three RBIs. Perry had been promoted from the Braves' Triple-A affiliate two weeks prior, and Elia blamed a lack of scouting on the International League for the loss; Green called this a "cop out", and said the scouting report for Perry was on his desk. Citing Elia's lack of preparation, loss of discipline, the Cubs' 54–69 record and fifth place standing in the NL East, Elia was fired as manager 132 games into the season. Although Green hoped to retain Elia in a different role for the final year of his contract, Elia ultimately decided to leave, citing a desire to return home.

=== 1984–1988: Returning to the Phillies ===
After being fired by the Cubs, Elia rejoined the Phillies organization as manager for the Triple-A Portland Beavers. He replaced John Felske, who had been promoted to be the Phillies' bench coach. Elia's tenure in Portland is remembered for his role in an unusual incident during a May 30, 1984 game against the Vancouver Canadians. Elia was ejected for arguing a called third strike and threw a chair onto the field before leaving the dugout; this led to the ejection of the team's batboy Sam Morris, who refused (acting on instructions from Beavers players in the dugout) umpire Pam Postema's demand that to retrieve the chair from field. Elia led the Beavers to a 62–78 record in the Pacific Coast League, a last-place finish in the Northern Division.

With Felske named as the new Phillies manager for 1985, Elia was promoted back to the major leagues to serve as bench coach. The Phillies finished the season 75–87, fifth in the NL East. They improved to 86–75 in 1986, second place in the division, but finished 21.5 games back of the New York Mets.

Elia remained as bench coach for the 1987 season. After a 29–32 start, Felske was fired and Elia was named interim manager. Third baseman Mike Schmidt remarked: "I'm friends with Lee. I'll be able to yell at him to come out on the field so we can discuss something, and he won't think I'm trying to undermine him." The Phillies recovered to 66–57, 6.5 games back in the NL East, in late August, and Elia was handed the job on a permanent basis in September. But after going 12–17 in September and October, the Phillies finished 80–82. While the Phillies won 51 of 101 games under Elia's leadership, he described their fourth place finish in the NL East as "disappointing".

Elia spoke of a desire to institute a sense of character into his team for 1988. He clashed with his first baseman Von Hayes in June, after Hayes popped out and threw his batting helmet in the dugout, which struck Elia. Elia later remarked, "[I]t's all in the family. Yes, there was some yelling and shoving and a few unpleasantries said, because I thought the helmet was thrown in my direction. But, when you're together for eight months of the year, heck, these things happen." Despite the Phillies being in last place in the NL East with a 35–44 record, Elia was given a 1-year contract extension in July, with Phillies personnel director Lee Thomas remarking that Elia was the right man to turn their season around. He was unable to do so, however: with the Phillies holding an NL East-worst record of 60–92 in September, Elia was fired, replaced by John Vukovich. The Phillies ultimately finished 65–96, their worst season since 1972.

=== 1989–2012: Later roles ===
After Dallas Green was appointed manager of the New York Yankees in 1989, Elia joined his coaching staff but was released by the team in August. He returned to the Phillies organization the following year as manager of the Clearwater Phillies of the Class A Florida State League. In his first season, he led the team to a 50–87 record, last in the West Division, before improving to 81–49 in his second year, winning a division title and playoff berth. After a bye, they swept the St. Lucie Mets 2–0 in the semifinals before losing to the West Palm Beach Expos in the finals.

A promotion back to the Phillies' Triple-A affiliate followed in 1992, now the Scranton/Wilkes-Barre Red Barons of the International League. Elia led the team to an 84–58 record and the Eastern Division title. After defeating the Pawtucket Red Sox in the semifinals, the Red Barons lost the championship series to the Columbus Clippers. Elia was named IL Manager of the Year.

In 1993, Elia joined Lou Piniella's Seattle Mariners staff as bench coach. He was later named hitting instructor and worked closely with Alex Rodriguez as he won a batting title in 1996. Elia remained with the team through 1997. He was named director of minor-league instruction for the Phillies for the 1999 season and served as bench coach for the 2000 Toronto Blue Jays. He returned to the Mariners for the 2001 season in a consulting role, spending two more years there.

Elia was reunited with Piniella for three seasons as hitting coach for the Tampa Bay Devil Rays. He next spent a year as bench coach for the Baltimore Orioles before returning to Tampa Bay as a pro scout for 2007. He next became a Mariners consultant for one year, supporting manager John McLaren. Elia was named special assistant to general manager Ned Colletti of the Los Angeles Dodgers in 2009, and held the same role for Frank Wren of the Atlanta Braves two years later. He was a special assistant for player development with the Braves for the 2012 season.

=== Managerial record ===
Team	Year	Regular season					Postseason			
Team	Year	Games	Won	Lost	Win %	Finish	Won	Lost	Win %	Result
CHC	1982	162	73	89	.451	5th in NL East	–	–	–	
CHC	1983	123	54	69	.439	Fired	–	–	–	
CHC total		285	127	158	.446		–	–	–	
PHI	1987	101	51	50	.505	4th in NL East	–	–	–	
PHI	1988	153	60	92	.395	Fired	–	–	–	
PHI total		254	111	142	.439		–	–	–	
Total		539	238	300	.442		–	–	–	

== Personal life and death ==
Elia was married twice, and had two daughters. He was the uncle of Olympic swimmer Frank Leskaj, who represented Albania in the 1992 Summer Olympics.

He was diagnosed with prostate cancer in May 1997; after undergoing surgery, he was declared cancer-free in September. He commemorated the 25-year anniversary of his Cubs rant by professing his love for the Cubs fans, and sold recordings embedded into a baseball in order to raise money for the Chicago Baseball Cancer Charities.

Elia was inducted into the Pennsylvania Sports Hall of Fame in 2003.

Elia died in Odessa, Florida on July 9, 2025, one week before his 88th birthday.

Sporting positions
Preceded by Joey Amalfitano	Chicago Cubs Manager; 1982–83	Succeeded by Charlie Fox
Preceded by John Felske	Philadelphia Phillies Manager; 1987–88	Succeeded by John Vukovich
Preceded by Tom Trebelhorn	Baltimore Orioles Bench Coach; 2006	Succeeded by Tom Trebelhorn
Preceded by Jeff Pentland	Seattle Mariners Hitting Coach; 2008	Succeeded by José Castro
Preceded by Jim Riggleman	Seattle Mariners Bench Coach; 2008	Succeeded by Ty Van Burkleo
