= Wally Ritchie =

American baseball player (born 1965)

- Pitcher
- Born: July 12, 1965 (age 61); Glendale, California, U.S.
- Batted: Left Threw: Left

MLB debut
- May 1, 1987, for the Philadelphia Phillies

Last MLB appearance
- July 28, 1992, for the Philadelphia Phillies

MLB statistics
- Win–loss record: 6–5
- Earned run average: 3.14
- Strikeouts: 98
- Stats at Baseball Reference

Teams
- Philadelphia Phillies (1987–1988, 1991–1992)

Wallace Reid Ritchie (born July 12, 1965) is a former Major League Baseball pitcher. He played all or parts of four seasons in the majors, between 1987 and 1992, for the Philadelphia Phillies. He pitched in a total of 147 major league games, all in relief.

== Amateur career ==
Ritchie attended high school at Herbert Hoover in Glendale, California where he was named All-CIF Southern Section. He began his college baseball career at Brigham Young University. After his freshman year, he transferred to Glendale Community College.

== Professional career ==
He was selected by the Phillies in the fourth round of the 1985 Major League Baseball draft. Although he had signed a letter of intent to continue his college baseball at Loyola Marymount, he chose to sign with the Phillies and was assigned to the Bend Phillies to begin his professional career. In the offseason after the 1986 season, Ritchie played in Mexico for the Venados de Mazatlán.

Ritchie made his Major League debut on May 1, 1987 against the Cincinnati Reds. He pitched a scoreless inning in relief of Tom Hume at Veterans Stadium. On June 29, he recorded the first save of his big league career by retiring nine consecutive batters. Ritchie would total 62.1 innings pitched over 49 relief appearances in 1987, the fullest season of his Major League career.

Ritchie appeared in 19 games in relief for the Phillies in 1988 but was demoted to Triple-A on June 24 in favor of pitcher Mike Maddux and did not return to the big league roster that season.

Ritchie spent entirety of the 1989 and 1990 seasons in Triple-A with the newly formed Scranton/Wilkes-Barre Red Barons, primarily as a starting pitcher. He was credit with throwing a no-hitter in the first game of a doubleheader against the Syracuse Chiefs on May 25, 1990. In 2014, Ritchie would return to throw out a ceremonial first pitch in celebration of the franchise's 25th anniversary.

On May 7, 1991, Ritchie returned to the Major Leagues for the first time since 1988 after the Phillies' Lenny Dykstra and Darren Daulton were injured in a drunk driving car accident. On June 4, Ritchie hit Atlanta Braves veteran outfielder Otis Nixon with a pitch for the first time in Nixon's career. Nixon charged the mound, kicked Ritchie in the stomach and punched him in the head three times. Ritchie was suspended for one game. Ritchie was injured in the scuffle and placed on the disabled list but was activated and served his suspension a few weeks later on June 27.

Ritchie saw consistent use out of the Philadelphia bullpen to start the 1992 season but was demoted to the minors on July 29 and did not appear in another Major League game in his career.

He became a free agent after the 1992 season and signed with the Los Angeles Dodgers. The Dodgers released him during spring training and he caught on with the Detroit Tigers five days later. He was invited to the Triple-A All-Star Game that year. He spent the following season in Double-A in the Cincinnati Reds farm system. In December 1994, the Pittsburgh Pirates signed him to a minor league contract during the 1994–95 Major League Baseball strike.

Ritchie returned to baseball in 1997 after a hiatus of two seasons spent working in construction and civil engineering. He spent the 1997 season in independent baseball with the Salinas Peppers and joined the Mission Viejo Vigilantes the following year. While playing for Mission Viejo, he commuted from his parents' home in Glendale. He departed the Western Baseball League in the middle of the 1998 season to pitch for the Mercuries Tigers in the Chinese Professional Baseball League.

== Post-playing career and personal life ==
Ritchie is a Mormon who met his wife at a fireside. They married in 1988 and had at least three children. His daughter, Megan, was born in or around 1995.

After his playing career ended, he received a Bachelor of Science in 2002 and Master of Business Administration in 2002 from Pepperdine University. He has worked in the managerial positions for the city governments of Santa Clara, Utah and Ivins, Utah.

For several years, Ritchie was a volunteer pitching coach at Snow Canyon High School in Utah. He was hired as the pitching coach at BYU before the 2012 season.
