= Scott Terry (baseball) =

American baseball player (born 1959)

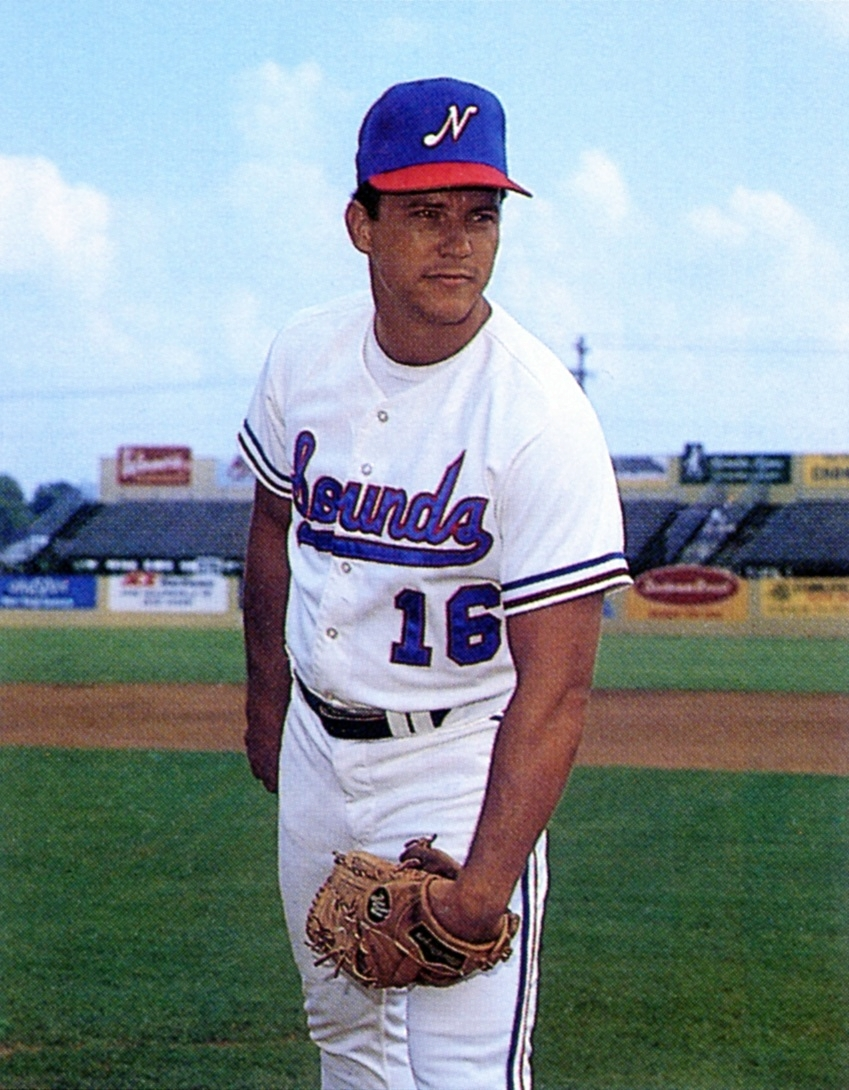
- Terry with the Nashville Sounds in 1987
- Pitcher
- Born: November 21, 1959 (age 66); Hobbs, New Mexico, U.S.
- Batted: Right Threw: Right

MLB debut
- April 9, 1986, for the Cincinnati Reds

Last MLB appearance
- September 13, 1991, for the St. Louis Cardinals

MLB statistics
- Win–loss record: 24–28
- Earned run average: 3.73
- Strikeouts: 262
- Stats at Baseball Reference

Teams
- Cincinnati Reds (1986); St. Louis Cardinals (1987–1991)

Scott Ray Terry (born November 21, 1959) is an American former Major League Baseball pitcher. He played during six seasons at the major league level for the Cincinnati Reds and St. Louis Cardinals.

Terry grew up in Portland, Texas and idolized Houston Astros outfielder César Cedeño as a youth. He attended Gregory-Portland High School in Portland where he played baseball and basketball. Although only 5 ft 5 in (1.65 m) tall as a senior, he could still dunk a basketball.

Terry played college baseball at Southwestern University, during which time he grew approximately six inches taller. His rapid growth spurt left him bow-legged and required multiple knee surgeries.

Terry was drafted by the Reds in the 12th round of the 1980 amateur draft as an outfielder. He played his first professional season with their Class A-Advanced Tampa Tarpons in 1983. After struggling in the minor leagues for a few years and making a few successful appearances on the mound during blowout games, Reds executive Sheldon Bender suggested converting Terry to a pitcher. He prospered in the new role and rose quickly through the minors.

As of 2024, Terry still lives in the St. Louis area, and remains active in the St. Louis amateur sports scene, particularly pickleball.

== Transactions ==
- June 3, 1980: Drafted by the Cincinnati Reds in the 12th round of the 1980 amateur draft.
- September 3, 1987: Sent by the Cincinnati Reds to the St. Louis Cardinals to complete an earlier deal made on August 31, 1987. The Cincinnati Reds sent a player to be named later to the St. Louis Cardinals for Pat Perry. The Cincinnati Reds sent Scott Terry to the St. Louis Cardinals to complete the trade.
- December 20, 1991: Granted Free Agency.
- January 4, 1992: Signed as a Free Agent with the St. Louis Cardinals.
