= Shane Turner =

American baseball player and coach (born 1963)

- Third baseman / Outfielder
- Born: January 8, 1963 (age 63); Los Angeles, California, U.S.
- Batted: Left Threw: Right

MLB debut
- August 19, 1988, for the Philadelphia Phillies

Last MLB appearance
- September 29, 1992, for the Seattle Mariners

MLB statistics
- Batting average: .236
- Home runs: 0
- Runs batted in: 6
- Stats at Baseball Reference

Teams
- Philadelphia Phillies (1988); Baltimore Orioles (1991); Seattle Mariners (1992)

Shane Lee Turner (born January 8, 1963) is an American former professional baseball player. He played in parts of three seasons in the Major League Baseball (MLB) for three different teams. He was the manager of the independent Hagerstown Flying Boxcars in 2025.

== Playing career ==
Turner attended Garey High School in Pomona, CA. He then played for Cal State Fullerton, playing twice in the College World Series and winning the 1984 national championship.

The New York Yankees selected him in the sixth round of the 1985 MLB draft. In 1987, he was traded with fellow prospect Keith Hughes to the Philadelphia Phillies for outfielder Mike Easler. Turner made his MLB debut the following year, batting 6-for-35 in 18 games.

From there, Turner played in the minors for another six seasons, getting brief trials with the Baltimore Orioles in 1991 and the Seattle Mariners in 1992. The latter was his most successful big league stint, as he batted .270 in 34 games, but he returned to the minors in 1993. In 1995, he was a replacement player during the ongoing strike for Cleveland during spring training.

== Managing and coaching career ==
After his playing career, Turner managed in the minors in the San Francisco Giants organization, starting in 1996 with the Bellingham Giants, then the Salem-Keizer Volcanoes in 1997. In 2007, he replaced Dave Machemer as manager of the Connecticut Defenders in mid-season. In 2011, he was the coordinator of instruction for the San Francisco Giants. He became the director of player development for the Giants in 2013.

On May 25, 2025, Turner became the manager of the Hagerstown Flying Boxcars of the independent Atlantic League of Professional Baseball, after Mark Mason was fired. In September, the team announced that Turner would not return in 2026.
