= Jim Lindeman =

American baseball player (born 1962)

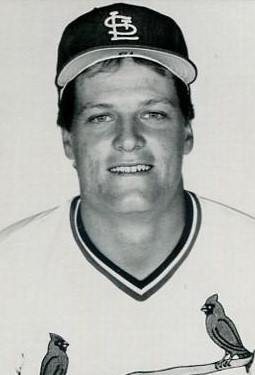
- Outfielder / First baseman
- Born: January 10, 1962 (age 64); Evanston, Illinois, U.S.
- Batted: Right Threw: Right

MLB debut
- September 3, 1986, for the St. Louis Cardinals

Last MLB appearance
- August 11, 1994, for the New York Mets

MLB statistics
- Batting average: .244
- Home runs: 21
- Runs batted in: 89
- Stats at Baseball Reference

Teams
- St. Louis Cardinals (1986–1989); Detroit Tigers (1990); Philadelphia Phillies (1991–1992); Houston Astros (1993); New York Mets (1994)

James William Lindeman (born January 10, 1962) is an American former Major League Baseball player. He played mostly in the outfield and at first base, appearing in parts of nine seasons in the majors from 1986 until 1994.

== Professional career ==
He was the St. Louis Cardinals' first-round draft pick in the 1983 Major League Baseball draft out of Bradley University. In 1986, he led the AAA Louisville Redbirds with 82 runs, 38 doubles, 20 home runs, and a league-leading 96 RBIs. He made his major league debut with the Cardinals in 1986, and played with them through the 1989 season. He saw the most playing time of his major league career in 1987, setting career highs in games played (75), at bats (207), hits (43), home runs (8) and RBI (28). Filling in for the injured Jack Clark, he batted .308 with a home run in the NLCS against the Giants and hit .333 in the World Series against the Twins.

Over the next five seasons he played for four different teams, never playing in more than 75 games in a season in his career. His final professional season was spent with the minor league Oklahoma City 89ers, a Texas Rangers farm team, in 1995.

== Personal life ==
Lindeman currently lives in Elk Grove Village, Illinois with his wife and four children. He taught P.E. at Rolling Meadows High School and coached the baseball team and the freshmen basketball B team. He also coached freshman golf. Lindeman retired as a P.E. teacher from Rolling Meadows at the end of the 2022–23 school year.
