= Lee Tunnell =

American baseball player (born 1960)

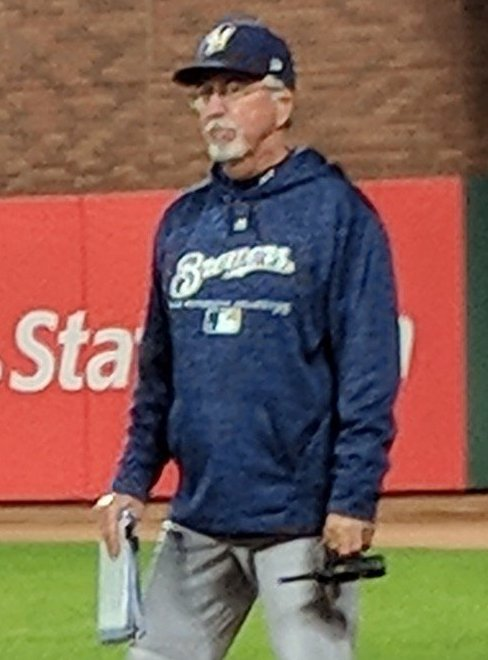
- Tunnell with the Milwaukee Brewers in 2018
- Pitcher
- Born: October 30, 1960 (age 65); Tyler, Texas, U.S.
- Batted: Right Threw: Right

Professional debut
- MLB: September 4, 1982, for the Pittsburgh Pirates
- NPB: August 1, 1991, for the Fukuoka Daiei Hawks

Last appearance
- MLB: June 22, 1989, for the Minnesota Twins
- NPB: September 28, 1993, for the Fukuoka Daiei Hawks

MLB statistics
- Win–loss record: 22–28
- Earned run average: 4.23
- Strikeouts: 280

NPB statistics
- Win–loss record: 10–19
- Earned run average: 4.91
- Strikeouts: 109
- Stats at Baseball Reference

Teams
- Pittsburgh Pirates (1982–1985); St. Louis Cardinals (1987); Minnesota Twins (1989); Fukuoka Daiei Hawks (1991–1993)

Byron Lee Tunnell (/ˈtʌnəl/ TUN-əl; born October 30, 1960) is an American professional baseball coach and retired player. He played as a pitcher in Major League Baseball (MLB) and Nippon Professional Baseball. He was the bullpen coach for the Milwaukee Brewers of MLB.

== Early life ==
Tunnell graduated from Anderson High School in Austin, Texas, and then attended Baylor University in Waco, Texas, where he was a star pitcher on the Bears team from 1979 to 1981.

== Playing career ==
Tunnell pitched all or part of six seasons in the majors, between 1982 and 1989, for the Pittsburgh Pirates, St. Louis Cardinals, and Minnesota Twins.

In 483 innings pitched in 132 games, Tunnell committed only one error in 122 total chances (33 putouts, 88 assists) for a stellar .992 fielding percentage.

He also pitched three seasons in Nippon Professional Baseball, from 1991 until 1993, for the Fukuoka Daiei Hawks.

== Coaching career ==
Following his playing career, Tunnell coached in the minor leagues for several years, including a brief stint as interim pitching coach with the Cincinnati Reds in 2006.

In July 2012, he was named interim bullpen coach of the Milwaukee Brewers, a position he held until 2018, when his contract was not renewed by the Brewers front office.

After spending the previous four years as the Reds' bullpen coach, Tunnell was fired following the 2022 season on October 6, 2022.
