= Tom Newell (baseball) =

American baseball player

- Pitcher
- Born: May 17, 1963 (age 63); Monrovia, California, U.S.
- Batted: Right Threw: Right

MLB debut
- September 9, 1987, for the Philadelphia Phillies

Last MLB appearance
- September 18, 1987, for the Philadelphia Phillies

MLB statistics
- Win–loss record: 0–0
- Earned run average: 36.00
- Strikeouts: 1
- Stats at Baseball Reference

Teams
- Philadelphia Phillies (1987)

Thomas Dean Newell (born May 17, 1963) is an American former Major League Baseball pitcher who played with the Philadelphia Phillies in 1987.

Newell attended Douglas High School in Nevada and played college baseball at Lassen College. He was initially an outfielder in Philadelphia's farm system before being converted to pitching in 1987.

== Playing career ==
The Philadelphia Phillies drafted Tom Newell in the 24th round of the MLB draft. He and fellow pitcher John Costello were the only players drafted in that low round that actually ended up making it to the majors. Newell made his professional debut as an outfielder in the Phillies minor league system, but after two seasons, he was converted into a pitcher. The Spartanburg Suns finished with a 66-70 record, and Newell, along with Bob Scanlan both finished the season with double digit losses.

In 1986, Newell started out with Philadelphia's single A team in Clearwater, but ended up making the jump to Portland, the triple A team. After the season was over, Philadelphia dropped Portland and signed an agreement to make the Maine Guides their new Triple A farm club. Newell was struggling with Maine, that however, did not sway Philadelphia from promoting him to the major league club.

Tom Newell played two games in the majors, his last occurring September 18, 1987. Called in to relieve starter Bruce Ruffin, Newell proceeded to record the final out to get out of the inning. He started the fourth inning, and after walking two batters, giving up two hits, and allowing two runs, he was lifted from the game, and relieved by Freddie Toliver. After the game, Newell was demoted to the minor leagues.

Cast off by Philadelphia after the 1988 season, Newell was out of baseball in 1989, and signed a minor league deal with the New York Yankees in 1990, in hopes of reviving his career. After a terrible stint with Triple A Columbus after being promoted from Double A, Newell was released by the Yankees, and he never pitched another game in organized ball.
