= Jeff Stone (baseball) =

American baseball player (born 1960)

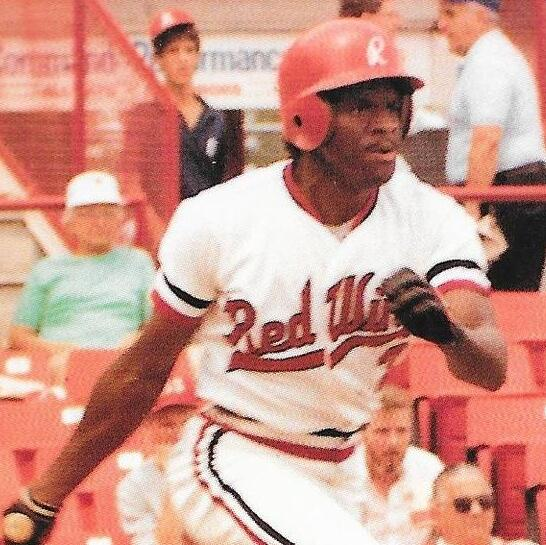
- Stone with the Rochester Red Wings c. 1988
- Left fielder
- Born: December 26, 1960 (age 65); Kennett, Missouri, U.S.
- Batted: Left Threw: Right

MLB debut
- September 9, 1983, for the Philadelphia Phillies

Last MLB appearance
- October 2, 1990, for the Boston Red Sox

MLB statistics
- Batting average: .277
- Home runs: 11
- Runs batted in: 72
- Stats at Baseball Reference

Teams
- Philadelphia Phillies (1983–1987); Baltimore Orioles (1988); Texas Rangers (1989); Boston Red Sox (1989–1990)

Jeffrey Glen Stone (born December 26, 1960) is an American former professional baseball left fielder. He played eight seasons in Major League Baseball (MLB) for the Philadelphia Phillies, Baltimore Orioles, Texas Rangers, and Boston Red Sox.

Stone was signed by the Phillies as an amateur free agent in 1979 out of North Pemiscot High School in Wardell, Missouri. He played his first professional season with their Class A (Short Season) Central Oregon Phillies in 1980. In 1981, Stone played for Class A Spartanburg, where he stole 123 bases while being caught just 13 times, and the next year, he stole 94 bases while at Class A Peninsula of the Carolina League. In 1983, Stone was named the MVP of the Eastern League.

Stone was a journeyman major leaguer for Philadelphia, Baltimore, Texas, and Boston from 1983 to 1990, dividing his playing time between the majors and the Class AAA affiliates of those four clubs. In 1990, Stone achieved one of the highlights of his career. After entering the game as a pinch runner earlier in the night, Stone lined a walk off single against the Blue Jays to give the Red Sox sole possession of first place, one game ahead of 2nd place Toronto. It was a key win as the Red Sox held off the Blue Jays to win the AL East in 1990. His last professional season was 1992, playing for Triple-A teams of the Detroit Tigers (Toledo Mud Hens), Philadelphia (Scranton/Wilkes-Barre Red Barons), and the Cincinnati Reds (Nashville Sounds).
