= John Felske =

American baseball player and manager (born 1942)

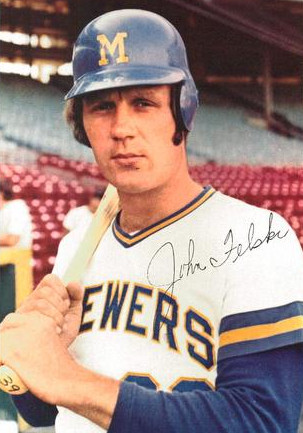
- Felske in 1973
- Catcher / Manager
- Born: May 30, 1942; Chicago, Illinois, U.S.
- Died: November 30, 2024 (aged 82); Blue Eye, Missouri, U.S.
- Batted: Right Threw: Right

MLB debut
- July 26, 1968, for the Chicago Cubs

Last MLB appearance
- September 8, 1973, for the Milwaukee Brewers

MLB statistics
- Batting average: .135
- Home runs: 1
- Runs batted in: 9
- Managerial record: 190–194
- Stats at Baseball Reference
- Managerial record at Baseball Reference

Teams
- As player: Chicago Cubs (1968); Milwaukee Brewers (1972–1973); As manager: Philadelphia Phillies (1985–1987); As coach: Toronto Blue Jays (1980–1981); Philadelphia Phillies (1984)

John Frederick Felske (May 30, 1942 - November 30, 2024) was an American professional baseball catcher, coach, and manager in Major League Baseball (MLB). Felske reached the big leagues as a player with the Chicago Cubs (1968) and Milwaukee Brewers (1972–1973). Most notably, he was the manager of the Philadelphia Phillies, where he achieved a record of 190 victories and 194 defeats (.495), across all or part of three seasons (1985–1986 and the first 61 games of 1987), before being succeeded by Lee Elia.

== Playing career ==
Felske batted and threw right-handed, stood 6 feet 3 inches (1.91 m) tall and weighed 195 pounds (88 kg). After attending the University of Illinois, Felske signed with the Chicago Cubs in 1961, but his shortcomings as a batter—and the durability of Chicago backstop Randy Hundley—kept him at the minor league level except for two at bats in the middle of the 1968 season.

He was drafted by the Seattle Pilots in December 1969, and played a total of 50 games over the 1972 and 1973 seasons for the Pilots' successor franchise, the Milwaukee Brewers, as third-string receiver. He spent the bulk of his career in Triple-A, again because of his mostly weak hitting. Overall, Felske, a right-handed hitter, batted only .135 in his major league career with 14 hits and one home run, hit on June 1, 1972, against Lindy McDaniel in a 9–8 Brewer win over the New York Yankees at Milwaukee County Stadium.

== Manager and coach ==
In 1974, Felske turned his hand to managing in the Brewer farm system, reaching the Triple-A level in 1977. After winning the division title with the 1979 Vancouver Canadians of the Pacific Coast League, Felske was named as the bullpen coach for the Toronto Blue Jays under skipper Bobby Mattick for 1980 and 1981. When Mattick stepped down in favor of Bobby Cox, Felske joined the Philadelphia farm system, and won another PCL divisional title in 1983 with the Portland Beavers.

He was promoted to the Phillies' coaching staff for the 1984 season as heir apparent to their skipper Paul Owens, who also was the club's general manager. Owens resigned his managing post September 30 of that season, and Felske took over the helm. However, the Phillies—1983 National League champions—were in rapid decline. Hall of Fame left-hander Steve Carlton was coming to the end of his career, and youngsters called up to replace aging veterans fell short of expectations.

The 1985 Phillies won only 75 games, and Felske bore the brunt of criticism from fans and media. While the 1986 club improved to second place in the NL East Division and 86 wins, it finished 21 1/2 games behind the frontrunning rival and eventual champion New York Mets. Meanwhile, the team's front office turned over with Owens' retirement. In 1987, when the Phillies won only 29 of their first 61 games on their way to a fourth-place finish, Felske was fired June 18.

Felske died on November 30, 2024.
