= Steve Bedrosian =

American baseball player (born 1957)

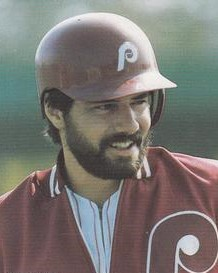
- Pitcher
- Born: December 6, 1957 (age 68); Methuen, Massachusetts, U.S.
- Batted: Right Threw: Right

MLB debut
- August 14, 1981, for the Atlanta Braves

Last MLB appearance
- August 9, 1995, for the Atlanta Braves

MLB statistics
- Win–loss record: 76–79
- Earned run average: 3.38
- Strikeouts: 921
- Saves: 184
- Stats at Baseball Reference

Teams
- Atlanta Braves (1981–1985); Philadelphia Phillies (1986–1989); San Francisco Giants (1989–1990); Minnesota Twins (1991); Atlanta Braves (1993–1995)

Career highlights and awards
- All-Star (1987); World Series champion (1991); NL Cy Young Award (1987); NL Rolaids Relief Man Award (1987); NL saves leader (1987)

Stephen Wayne Bedrosian (born December 6, 1957), nicknamed "Bedrock", is an American former professional baseball pitcher who played 14 seasons in Major League Baseball (MLB), primarily with the Atlanta Braves. He also played for the Philadelphia Phillies, where he won the 1987 National League Cy Young Award, and the Minnesota Twins, where he won the 1991 World Series. He is the father of Cam Bedrosian who played in MLB from 2014 to 2021.

== Biography ==
At the University of New Haven, Bedrosian put up a career record of 13–3 and 3 saves. He helped the Chargers to a third-place finish in the 1978 Division II College World Series. He was then drafted by the Atlanta Braves in the 1978 MLB draft.

In 1985, his only full season as a starter, Bedrosian went 7–15 and set a Major League record for most starts in a single season without a complete game (37).

Bedrosian was traded by the Braves to the Phillies in the off-season and was converted to a reliever before the 1986 season. In his first year in relief, he saved 29 games. His best season came in 1987 when he posted a 5–3 record for the Phillies with a 2.83 earned run average, recorded a league-leading 40 saves, and was named the National League Cy Young Award winner. Since Bedrosian, only two other National League relievers (Mark Davis and Éric Gagné) have won Cy Young honors. He also received the Sporting News Reliever of the Year Award in 1987, as well as the MLB Rolaids Relief Man Award.

He was traded to the Giants during the 1989 season to help their pennant drive that year. In 1990, he won the Willie Mac Award, voted upon by his teammates, honoring his spirit and leadership (his then two-year-old son Cody was battling leukemia).

As a member of the Minnesota Twins, Bedrosian won his first World Series ring in the 1991 World Series, which the Twins won in seven games over his former team, the Atlanta Braves.

Bedrosian was a member of the Atlanta Braves team that won the 1995 World Series, and while he retired in August of that season, he still received his second World Series ring.

== Personal life ==
Currently, Bedrosian resides in Newnan, Georgia, where he served on the Coweta County Board of Education, through 2010, and is an assistant baseball coach at East Coweta High School.

In 2008, Bedrosian was inducted into the Coweta Sports Hall of Fame. Bedrosian has also been inducted into the University of New Haven Hall of Fame.

Bedrosian is of Armenian descent. He was referenced in the episode "A Very Sunny Christmas" of It's Always Sunny in Philadelphia.

== See also ==
- List of Major League Baseball annual saves leaders
- List of second-generation Major League Baseball players
