= Greg Mathews (baseball) =

American baseball player (born 1962)

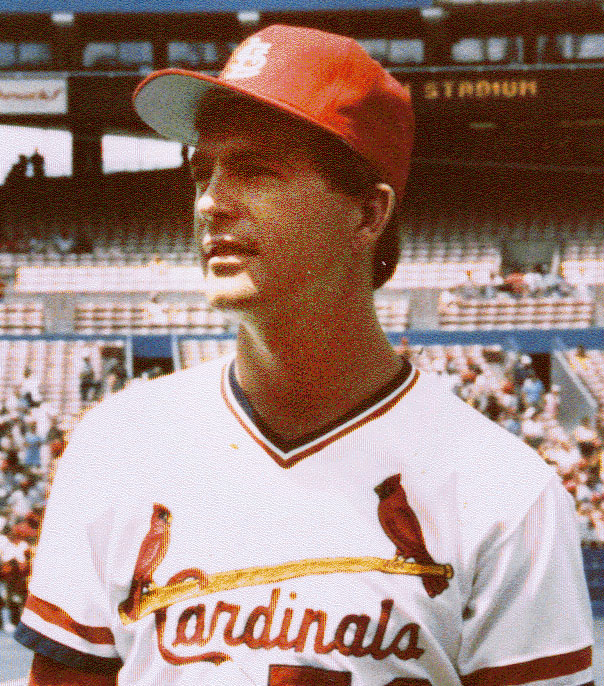
- Pitcher
- Born: May 17, 1962 (age 64); Harbor City, Los Angeles, California, U.S.
- Batted: Right Threw: Left

MLB debut
- June 3, 1986, for the St. Louis Cardinals

Last MLB appearance
- October 3, 1992, for the Philadelphia Phillies

MLB statistics
- Win–loss record: 28–33
- Earned run average: 4.08
- Strikeouts: 251
- Stats at Baseball Reference

Teams
- St. Louis Cardinals (1986–1988, 1990); Philadelphia Phillies (1992)

Gregory Inman Mathews (born May 17, 1962) is an American former professional baseball pitcher. He played five seasons in Major League Baseball (MLB) for the St. Louis Cardinals and Philadelphia Phillies from 1986 to 1992.

Mathews is an alumnus of Savanna High School in Anaheim, California, and of California State University, Fullerton. He played summer collegiate baseball for the Hazlet Elks of the Saskatchewan Major Baseball League in 1986 prior to playing in the majors. During his rookie year Greg put up a 3.65 ERA in 145.1 innings. His 11 wins in 1986 were the most by a Cardinal rookie since Brooks Lawrence had 15 in 1954; Luis Arroyo also had 11 wins as a rookie in 1955. His best year is most likely 1987, when he posted a 3.73 ERA, won 11 games and struck out 108 batters.

He lives in Buena Park, California.
