= John Tudor (baseball) =

American baseball player (born 1954)

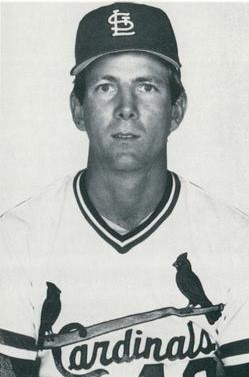
- Pitcher
- Born: February 2, 1954 (age 72); Schenectady, New York, U.S.
- Batted: Left Threw: Left

MLB debut
- August 16, 1979, for the Boston Red Sox

Last MLB appearance
- September 13, 1990, for the St. Louis Cardinals

MLB statistics
- Win–loss record: 117–72
- Earned run average: 3.12
- Strikeouts: 988
- Stats at Baseball Reference

Teams
- Boston Red Sox (1979–1983); Pittsburgh Pirates (1984); St. Louis Cardinals (1985–1988); Los Angeles Dodgers (1988–1989); St. Louis Cardinals (1990)

Career highlights and awards
- World Series champion (1988); St. Louis Cardinals Hall of Fame

John Thomas Tudor (born February 2, 1954) is an American former professional baseball pitcher. He played 12 seasons in Major League Baseball (MLB) for the Boston Red Sox, Pittsburgh Pirates, St. Louis Cardinals, and Los Angeles Dodgers.

== Early life ==
Tudor is the oldest of three children born to Jean and Melton Tudor, an engineer. Although born in the Capital District of New York, Tudor was raised in Peabody, Massachusetts, and attended Peabody High School, where he played hockey and was once cut from the school's baseball team.

== Amateur career ==
Tudor began his college baseball career at North Shore Community College in Danvers, Massachusetts, where he was the team's best pitcher and hitter. After two years at North Shore, Tudor wrote a letter to Georgia Southern University and ABCA Hall of Fame head coach Ron Polk asking for the opportunity to walk on to their baseball program. Tudor successfully made the Eagles' roster as the team's fifth starting pitcher. He graduated from the school with a bachelor's degree in criminal justice. In 1975, he played collegiate summer baseball with the Falmouth Commodores of the Cape Cod Baseball League. Tudor was drafted by the Boston Red Sox in the third round of the 1976 MLB draft (secondary phase) from Georgia Southern.

== Early career ==
Tudor debuted with the Red Sox on August 16, 1979. He spent some time in the minors in 1980 and was used as both a starter and reliever in 1981. On September 9, 1981, Tudor recorded the only save of his major league career by retiring the only batter he faced in the 11th inning to close out a 6–5 Red Sox victory over the Tigers. Tudor finally established himself as a member of the rotation in 1982, going 13–10 with a 3.63 ERA. After finishing 13–12 the following season, Tudor was traded to the Pittsburgh Pirates for designated hitter Mike Easler. After one year in Pittsburgh, in which he was 12–11 with a 3.27 ERA, he was sent to St. Louis as part of a deal for veteran outfielder George Hendrick. The Pirates received a career minor leaguer in the deal and sent catcher Brian Harper to the Cardinals.

== 1985 ==
Tudor's career highlight was a spectacular 1985 season for the St. Louis Cardinals. Oddly enough, Tudor started that year with a 1–7 record and a 3.74 earned run average through May. He then went on a 20–1 run with a 1.37 ERA the rest of the season and lowering his overall ERA to 1.93. According to Tudor, the change in performance came from a phone call from his former high school catcher, who, after watching Tudor on TV, had noticed a hitch in Tudor's delivery that he had not seen Tudor have before. Tudor concluded the season by winning his last eleven decisions. Only the best season of Dwight Gooden's career stopped Tudor from winning the National League Cy Young Award and leading the league in ERA, wins and complete games. He was sixth in strikeouts for the year.

Moreover, Tudor's ten complete game shutouts in 1985 made him the only pitcher since Jim Palmer in 1975 to reach double-digits in that category. (Bob Gibson holds the Cardinal record with 13 in 1968). To make the achievement more impressive, his ten shutouts were all in the last four months of 1985. To date, Tudor is the last Major League player to record ten or more shutouts in a season. The most since then is eight, by Los Angeles Dodger pitcher Orel Hershiser and Boston pitcher Roger Clemens in 1988 and Los Angeles Dodger pitcher Tim Belcher in 1989.

The Cardinals were in the heat of a division race against Gooden and the New York Mets in September 1985. Tudor improved even more by starting the month with two consecutive shutouts and then pitched against Gooden himself in a matchup on September 11. Gooden and Tudor locked horns pitch-for-pitch and the score was 0–0 after nine innings. Jesse Orosco took over for Gooden in the tenth inning and gave up a home run to César Cedeño. Tudor came back out in the bottom of the inning and finished the three-hit, ten-inning masterpiece for his third consecutive shutout of the month. After two sub-par performances, he pitched his fourth shutout of the month and then pitched another ten innings of shutout ball against the Mets' Ron Darling but the Mets turned the table and beat the Cardinals' bullpen in the eleventh inning.

Tudor's pitching propelled the Cardinals into the playoffs. He lost Game 1 of the National League Championship Series against the Los Angeles Dodgers but won Game 4 to even the series and St. Louis won 4 games to 2. Tudor was masterful in Game 1 of the 1985 World Series against the long-shot Kansas City Royals, and even better with a shutout in Game 4. However, after a devastating and controversial Cardinals' loss in the 9th inning of Game Six in which the team fell just short of clinching the World Series, Tudor and the Cardinals completely fell apart in Game 7. Tudor allowed five runs and four walks before being pulled in the third inning, as the Royals rolled to an 11–0 victory for their first World Championship. Tudor was saddled with the loss. Upset by his performance in Game 7, he cut his pitching hand in a post-game fit by punching an electrical fan.

== After 1985 ==
Tudor never matched his dominance of 1985. While still posting low ERAs, he never won more than 13 games. In 1987, he was again in the World Series but again lost with a chance to win the World Series. Injuries limited Tudor's playing time after 1985 and eventually ended his career. He was the victim of a freak accident in 1987 when Mets' catcher Barry Lyons went into the Cardinals' dugout trying to catch a foul ball and crashed into Tudor, breaking Tudor's leg. In 1988, Tudor was traded to the Dodgers despite having the league's best ERA. He pitched well again and won his only World Series ring for the 1988 World Series, but severely injured his elbow during the postseason. That injury caused Tudor to miss almost all of 1989 and then retire despite a good comeback season (12–4, 2.40 ERA) in 1990.

== Career statistics ==
W	L	PCT	ERA	G	GS	CG	SHO	BF	IP	H	R	ER	HR	K	BB	BB/9	WP	HBP	Fld%	AVG	SH
117	72	.619	3.12	281	263	50	16	7368	1797	1677	700	623	156	988	475	2.4	18	29	.974	.154	41

== See also ==
- List of Major League Baseball annual shutout leaders
- List of St. Louis Cardinals team records
