= 1987 Major League Baseball season =

1987 MLB season
- League: Major League Baseball
- Sport: Baseball
- Duration: April 6 – October 25, 1987
- Games: 162
- Teams: 26
- TV partner(s): ABC, NBC

Draft
- Top draft pick: Ken Griffey Jr.
- Picked by: Seattle Mariners

Regular season
- Season MVP: NL: Andre Dawson (CHC); AL: George Bell (TOR)

Postseason
- AL champions: Minnesota Twins
- AL runners-up: Detroit Tigers
- NL champions: St. Louis Cardinals
- NL runners-up: San Francisco Giants

World Series
- Champions: Minnesota Twins
- Runners-up: St. Louis Cardinals
- World Series MVP: Frank Viola (MIN)

MLB seasons
- ← 1986 1988 →

Locations of teams for the 1982–1988 American League seasons
West East
Locations of teams for the 1977–1992 National League seasons
West East

The 1987 Major League Baseball season ended with the American League Champion Minnesota Twins winning the World Series over the National League Champion St. Louis Cardinals, four games to three, as all seven games were won by the home team.

In June, future Hall of Fame outfielder Ken Griffey Jr. was selected with the number one overall pick in the Major League Baseball draft, by the Seattle Mariners.

== Awards and honors ==
- Baseball Hall of Fame
  - Ray Dandridge
  - Catfish Hunter
  - Billy Williams

Baseball Writers' Association of America Awards
BBWAA Award	National League	American League
Rookie of the Year	Benito Santiago (SD)	Mark McGwire (OAK)
Cy Young Award	Steve Bedrosian (PHI)	Roger Clemens (BOS)
Manager of the Year	Buck Rodgers (MON)	Sparky Anderson (DET)
Most Valuable Player	Andre Dawson (CHC)	George Bell (TOR)
Gold Glove Awards
Position	National League	American League
Pitcher	Rick Reuschel (SF)/(PIT)	Mark Langston (SEA)
Catcher	Mike Lavalliere (PIT)	Bob Boone (CAL)
First Baseman	Keith Hernandez (NYM)	Don Mattingly (NYY)
Second Baseman	Ryne Sandberg (CHC)	Frank White (KC)
Third Baseman	Terry Pendleton (STL)	Gary Gaetti (MIN)
Shortstop	Ozzie Smith (STL)	Tony Fernández (TOR)
Outfielders	Eric Davis (CIN)	Jesse Barfield (TOR)
Outfielders	Andre Dawson (CHC)	Kirby Puckett (MIN)
Outfielders	Tony Gwynn (SD)	Dave Winfield (NYY)
Silver Slugger Awards
Pitcher/Designated Hitter	Bob Forsch (STL)	Paul Molitor (MIL)
Catcher	Benito Santiago (SD)	Matt Nokes (DET)
First Baseman	Jack Clark (STL)	Don Mattingly (NYY)
Second Baseman	Juan Samuel (PHI)	Lou Whitaker (DET)
Third Baseman	Tim Wallach (MON)	Wade Boggs (BOS)
Shortstop	Ozzie Smith (STL)	Alan Trammell (DET)
Outfielders	Eric Davis (CIN)	George Bell (TOR)
Outfielders	Andre Dawson (CHC)	Dwight Evans (BOS)
Outfielders	Tony Gwynn (SD)	Kirby Puckett (MIN)

=== Other awards ===
- Outstanding Designated Hitter Award: Harold Baines (CWS)
- Roberto Clemente Award (Humanitarian): Rick Sutcliffe (CHC).
- Rolaids Relief Man Award: Dave Righetti (NYY, American); Steve Bedrosian (PHI, National).

=== Player of the Month ===
Month	American League	National League
April	Brian Downing	Eric Davis
May	Larry Parrish	Eric Davis
June	Wade Boggs	Tony Gwynn
July	Don Mattingly	Bo Díaz
August	Dwight Evans	Andre Dawson
September	Alan Trammell	Darryl Strawberry

=== Pitcher of the Month ===
Month	American League	National League
April	Bret Saberhagen	Sid Fernandez
May	Jim Clancy	Steve Bedrosian
June	Steve Ontiveros	Orel Hershiser
July	Frank Viola	Floyd Youmans
August	Mark Langston	Doug Drabek
September	Doyle Alexander	Pascual Pérez

== Statistical leaders ==
Statistic	American League		National League	
AVG	Wade Boggs (BOS)	.363	Tony Gwynn (SD)	.370
HR	Mark McGwire (OAK)	49	Andre Dawson (CHC)	49
RBIs	George Bell (TOR)	134	Andre Dawson (CHC)	137
Wins	Roger Clemens (BOS); Dave Stewart (OAK)	20	Rick Sutcliffe (CHC)	18
ERA	Jimmy Key (TOR)	2.76	Nolan Ryan (HOU)	2.76
SO	Mark Langston (SEA)	262	Nolan Ryan (HOU)	270
SV	Tom Henke (TOR)	34	Steve Bedrosian (PHI)	40
SB	Harold Reynolds (SEA)	60	Vince Coleman (STL)	109

== Standings ==
=== American League ===
AL East
Team	W	L	Pct.	GB	Home	Road
Detroit Tigers	98	64	.605	—	54‍–‍27	44‍–‍37
Toronto Blue Jays	96	66	.593	2	52‍–‍29	44‍–‍37
Milwaukee Brewers	91	71	.562	7	48‍–‍33	43‍–‍38
New York Yankees	89	73	.549	9	51‍–‍30	38‍–‍43
Boston Red Sox	78	84	.481	20	50‍–‍30	28‍–‍54
Baltimore Orioles	67	95	.414	31	31‍–‍51	36‍–‍44
Cleveland Indians	61	101	.377	37	35‍–‍46	26‍–‍55

AL West
Team	W	L	Pct.	GB	Home	Road
Minnesota Twins	85	77	.525	—	56‍–‍25	29‍–‍52
Kansas City Royals	83	79	.512	2	46‍–‍35	37‍–‍44
Oakland Athletics	81	81	.500	4	42‍–‍39	39‍–‍42
Seattle Mariners	78	84	.481	7	40‍–‍41	38‍–‍43
Chicago White Sox	77	85	.475	8	38‍–‍43	39‍–‍42
Texas Rangers	75	87	.463	10	43‍–‍38	32‍–‍49
California Angels	75	87	.463	10	38‍–‍43	37‍–‍44

=== National League ===
NL East
Team	W	L	Pct.	GB	Home	Road
St. Louis Cardinals	95	67	.586	—	49‍–‍32	46‍–‍35
New York Mets	92	70	.568	3	49‍–‍32	43‍–‍38
Montreal Expos	91	71	.562	4	48‍–‍33	43‍–‍38
Philadelphia Phillies	80	82	.494	15	43‍–‍38	37‍–‍44
Pittsburgh Pirates	80	82	.494	15	47‍–‍34	33‍–‍48
Chicago Cubs	76	85	.472	18½	40‍–‍40	36‍–‍45

NL West
Team	W	L	Pct.	GB	Home	Road
San Francisco Giants	90	72	.556	—	46‍–‍35	44‍–‍37
Cincinnati Reds	84	78	.519	6	42‍–‍39	42‍–‍39
Houston Astros	76	86	.469	14	47‍–‍34	29‍–‍52
Los Angeles Dodgers	73	89	.451	17	40‍–‍41	33‍–‍48
Atlanta Braves	69	92	.429	20½	42‍–‍39	27‍–‍53
San Diego Padres	65	97	.401	25	37‍–‍44	28‍–‍53

== Postseason ==
=== Bracket ===
League Championship Series (ALCS, NLCS)
East	Detroit	1
West	Minnesota	4
East	St. Louis	4
West	San Francisco	3

World Series
AL	Minnesota	4
NL	St. Louis	3

== Managers ==
=== American League ===
Team	Manager	Notes
Baltimore Orioles	Cal Ripken, Sr.	
Boston Red Sox	John McNamara	
California Angels	Gene Mauch	Mauch's final season as a Major League manager
Chicago White Sox	Jim Fregosi	
Cleveland Indians	Pat Corrales, Doc Edwards	
Detroit Tigers	Sparky Anderson	Won AL East
Kansas City Royals	Billy Gardner, John Wathan	
Milwaukee Brewers	Tom Trebelhorn	
Minnesota Twins	Tom Kelly	Won World Series
New York Yankees	Lou Piniella	
Oakland Athletics	Tony La Russa	
Seattle Mariners	Dick Williams	
Texas Rangers	Bobby Valentine	
Toronto Blue Jays	Jimy Williams	2nd season as Blue Jays manager

=== National League ===
Team	Manager	Notes
Atlanta Braves	Chuck Tanner	
Chicago Cubs	Gene Michael, Frank Lucchesi	Michael's final season as a Major League manager
Cincinnati Reds	Pete Rose	
Houston Astros	Hal Lanier	
Los Angeles Dodgers	Tommy Lasorda	
Montreal Expos	Buck Rodgers	
New York Mets	Davey Johnson	
Philadelphia Phillies	John Felske, Lee Elia	Felske's final season as a Major League manager
Pittsburgh Pirates	Jim Leyland	
St. Louis Cardinals	Whitey Herzog	Won National League Pennant
San Diego Padres	Larry Bowa	
San Francisco Giants	Roger Craig	Won NL West

== Home field attendance and payroll ==
Team name	Wins	%±	Home attendance	%±	Per game	Est. payroll	%±
St. Louis Cardinals	95	20.3%	3,072,122	24.3%	37,927	$11,758,000	19.1%
New York Mets	92	−14.8%	3,034,129	9.6%	37,458	$13,846,714	−10.0%
Los Angeles Dodgers	73	0.0%	2,797,409	−7.5%	34,536	$14,474,737	−4.9%
Toronto Blue Jays	96	11.6%	2,778,429	13.2%	34,302	$10,765,401	−15.9%
California Angels	75	−18.5%	2,696,299	1.5%	33,288	$13,855,999	−4.0%
New York Yankees	89	−1.1%	2,427,672	7.0%	29,971	$19,457,714	5.2%
Kansas City Royals	83	9.2%	2,392,471	3.1%	29,537	$12,513,056	−4.1%
Boston Red Sox	78	−17.9%	2,231,551	3.9%	27,894	$13,770,171	−4.4%
Cincinnati Reds	84	−2.3%	2,185,205	29.1%	26,978	$9,281,500	−22.0%
Philadelphia Phillies	80	−7.0%	2,100,110	8.6%	25,927	$12,482,997	7.7%
Minnesota Twins	85	19.7%	2,081,976	65.8%	25,703	$10,585,000	11.4%
Detroit Tigers	98	12.6%	2,061,830	8.5%	25,455	$12,122,881	−1.7%
Chicago Cubs	76	8.6%	2,035,130	9.5%	25,439	$15,473,026	−10.1%
San Francisco Giants	90	8.4%	1,917,168	25.4%	23,669	$8,532,500	−4.6%
Houston Astros	76	−20.8%	1,909,902	10.1%	23,579	$12,758,371	29.2%
Milwaukee Brewers	91	18.2%	1,909,244	50.9%	23,571	$7,293,224	−26.7%
Montreal Expos	91	16.7%	1,850,324	63.9%	22,844	$8,762,052	−21.1%
Baltimore Orioles	67	−8.2%	1,835,692	−7.0%	22,386	$14,250,273	9.6%
Texas Rangers	75	−13.8%	1,763,053	4.2%	21,766	$5,992,718	−11.1%
Oakland Athletics	81	6.6%	1,678,921	27.7%	20,727	$12,730,839	30.2%
San Diego Padres	65	−12.2%	1,454,061	−19.5%	17,951	$12,065,796	6.0%
Atlanta Braves	69	−4.2%	1,217,402	−12.2%	15,030	$17,444,560	2.0%
Chicago White Sox	77	6.9%	1,208,060	−15.2%	14,914	$12,135,343	16.5%
Pittsburgh Pirates	80	25.0%	1,161,193	16.0%	14,336	$8,789,500	−19.6%
Seattle Mariners	78	16.4%	1,134,255	10.2%	14,003	$4,623,000	−22.4%
Cleveland Indians	61	−27.4%	1,077,898	−26.8%	13,307	$9,033,750	15.7%

== Television coverage ==
Network	Day of week	Announcers
ABC	Monday nights Sunday afternoons	Al Michaels, Jim Palmer, Tim McCarver, Gary Bender
NBC	Saturday afternoons	Vin Scully, Joe Garagiola, Bob Costas, Tony Kubek

== Events ==
- January 14 – Catfish Hunter and Billy Williams are elected to the Hall of Fame by the Baseball Writers' Association of America.
- March 3 – Ray Dandridge, a third baseman from the Negro leagues, is the only player elected to the Hall of Fame by the Special Veterans Committee.
- April 13 – At Jack Murphy Stadium, the San Diego Padres set a major league record when the first three batters in the bottom of the first inning hit home runs off San Francisco Giants starter Roger Mason in their home opener. The Padres, trailing 3–0, got homers from Marvell Wynne, Tony Gwynn and John Kruk. Despite this, the Padres lost 13-6. This record would be matched in 2003.
- April 15 – Juan Nieves of the Milwaukee Brewers pitches a no-hitter against the Baltimore Orioles. He becomes the second-youngest pitcher in major league history to accomplish the feat, and the first Brewer to do so.
- April 17 – Mike Schmidt of the Philadelphia Phillies hits the 500th home run of his career. It came in the ninth inning against the Pittsburgh Pirates' Don Robinson, giving the Phillies an 8–6 win.
- June 2 – The Seattle Mariners use the number-one overall pick of the draft to select Ken Griffey Jr., signaling a turnaround in their fortunes as an organization.
- June 28 – Don Baylor of the visiting Boston Red Sox is hit by a pitch from Rick Rhoden in the sixth inning of a 6–2 win over the New York Yankees. The HBP gives Baylor 244 for his career, breaking Ron Hunt's modern-day record.
- July 14 – Tim Raines caps a 3-for-3 performance in the All-Star Game with a two-run triple in the top of the 13th inning, giving the National League a 2–0 victory over the American League. Raines is selected the MVP.
- July 8–18 – New York Yankees first baseman Don Mattingly tied a Major League record and broke an American League record by hitting home runs in eight consecutive games, in a 7–2 loss to the Texas Rangers. He tied the record set by Dale Long in 1956.
- August 11 – Mark McGwire of the Oakland Athletics breaks Al Rosen's American League rookie record by hitting his 38th home run in an 8–2 loss to the Mariners.
- August 26 – Paul Molitor of the Milwaukee Brewers goes hitless, and ends his 39-game hitting streak; it is the longest American League hitting streak since Joe DiMaggio's 56-game streak in 1941.
- August 30 – With knuckleball pitcher Charlie Hough on the mound, Texas Rangers catcher Geno Petralli ties a Major League record by committing six passed balls in a 7–0 loss to the Detroit Tigers at Tiger Stadium. All seven runs are unearned and come as a result of the passed balls. Petralli will go on to commit 35 passed balls on the season, breaking J. C. Martin's single-season record of 33 in 1965.
- September 9 – Nolan Ryan strikes out 16 to pass 4,500 for his career as the Houston Astros beat the San Francisco Giants 4–2. Ryan strikes out 12 of the final 13 batters and fans Mike Aldrete to complete the seventh inning for his 4,500th strikeout.
- September 14 – In the midst of the Toronto Blue Jays' 18–3 drubbing of the Baltimore Orioles, Cal Ripken Jr. is lifted from the lineup and replaced by Ron Washington, stopping Ripken's consecutive innings played streak at 8,243.
- September 18 – Darrell Evans hits his 30th home run of the season, and becomes the first player to do so after the age of 40.
- September 21 – Darryl Strawberry swipes his 30th base of the season to join the 30–30 club. With teammate Howard Johnson already having joined, it marks the first time that two teammates achieve 30–30 seasons in the same year.
- September 22 – Wade Boggs of the Boston Red Sox reaches the 200-hit mark for the fifth straight season in an 8–5 loss to the Detroit Tigers.
- October 4 – The Detroit Tigers defeat the Toronto Blue Jays 1–0 to clinch the American League East division title. The victory caps off a thrilling pennant race in which the Tigers overcame a 3.5 game deficit to the Blue Jays in the last two weeks of the season, including sweeping the Blue Jays at Tiger Stadium in the final weekend, and finishing two games ahead of Toronto in the standings.
- October 25 – In Game Seven of the World Series, starter Frank Viola and reliever Jeff Reardon hold the St. Louis Cardinals to six hits, as the Minnesota Twins win 4–2 for their second World Championship, and their first since moving to Minnesota and changing their name to the Twins. The franchise's first title came in 1924 as the Washington Senators. Viola is named the Series MVP.
- November 18 – Andre Dawson of the Chicago Cubs is announced as the winner of the National League MVP Award, becoming the first recipient of the award to play for a last place team.
