= 1987 in baseball =

The following are the baseball events of the year 1987 throughout the world.

== Major League Baseball ==
- World Series: Minnesota Twins over St. Louis Cardinals (4–3); Frank Viola, MVP

League Championship Series (ALCS, NLCS)
East	Detroit	1
West	Minnesota	4
East	St. Louis	4
West	San Francisco	3

World Series
AL	Minnesota	4
NL	St. Louis	3

  - American League Championship Series: Gary Gaetti, MVP
  - National League Championship Series: Jeffrey Leonard, MVP
- All-Star Game, July 14 at Oakland–Alameda County Coliseum: National League, 2–0 (13 innings); Tim Raines, MVP

== Other champions ==
- Caribbean World Series: Criollos de Caguas (Puerto Rico)
- College World Series: Stanford
- Japan Series: Seibu Lions over Yomiuri Giants (4–2)
- Korean Series: Haitai Tigers over Samsung Lions
- Big League World Series: Taipei, Taiwan
- Junior League World Series: Rowland Heights, California
- Little League World Series: Hua Lian, Taiwan
- Pan American Games: Cuba over USA
- Senior League World Series: Athens, Ohio

== Awards and honors ==
- Baseball Hall of Fame
  - Ray Dandridge
  - Catfish Hunter
  - Billy Williams
- Most Valuable Player
  - George Bell, Toronto Blue Jays, OF (AL)
  - Andre Dawson, Chicago Cubs, OF (NL)
- Cy Young Award
  - Roger Clemens, Boston Red Sox (AL)
  - Steve Bedrosian, Philadelphia Phillies (NL)
- Rookie of the Year
  - Mark McGwire, Oakland Athletics, 1B (AL)
  - Benito Santiago, San Diego Padres, C (NL)
- Manager of the Year Award
  - Sparky Anderson, Detroit Tigers (AL)
  - Buck Rodgers, Montreal Expos (NL)
- Woman Executive of the Year (major or minor league): Leslie Leary, Auburn Astros, New York–Penn League
- Gold Glove Award
  - Don Mattingly (1B) (AL)
  - Frank White (2B) (AL)
  - Gary Gaetti (3B) (AL)
  - Tony Fernández (SS) (AL)
  - Jesse Barfield (OF) (AL)
  - Gary Pettis (OF) (AL)
  - Kirby Puckett (OF) (AL)
  - Bob Boone (C) (AL)
  - Mark Langston (P) (AL)
  - Keith Hernandez (1B) (NL)
  - Ryne Sandberg (2B) (NL)
  - Terry Pendleton (3B) (NL)
  - Ozzie Smith (SS) (NL)
  - Eric Davis (OF) (NL)
  - Andre Dawson (OF) (NL)
  - Tony Gwynn (OF) (NL)
  - Mike LaValliere (C) (NL)
  - Rick Reuschel (P) (NL)

== MLB statistical leaders ==
	American League		National League
Type	Name	Stat	Name	Stat
AVG	Wade Boggs BOS	.363	Tony Gwynn SD	.370
HR	Mark McGwire OAK	49	Andre Dawson CHC	49
RBI	George Bell TOR	134	Andre Dawson CHC	137
Wins	Roger Clemens BOS & Dave Stewart OAK	20	Rick Sutcliffe CHC	18
ERA	Jimmy Key TOR	2.76	Nolan Ryan HOU	2.76

== Major League Baseball final standings ==
American League
Rank	Club	Wins	Losses	Win %	GB
East Division
1st	Detroit Tigers	98	64	.605	--
2nd	Toronto Blue Jays	96	66	.593	2
3rd	Milwaukee Brewers	91	71	.562	7
4th	New York Yankees	89	73	.549	9
5th	Boston Red Sox	78	84	.481	20
6th	Baltimore Orioles	67	95	.414	31
7th	Cleveland Indians	61	101	.377	37
West Division
1st	Minnesota Twins	85	77	.525	--
2nd	Kansas City Royals	83	79	.512	2
3rd	Oakland Athletics	81	81	.500	4
4th	Seattle Mariners	78	84	.481	7
5th	Chicago White Sox	77	85	.475	8
6th	California Angels	75	87	.463	10
6th	Texas Rangers	75	87	.463	10

National League
Rank	Club	Wins	Losses	Win %	GB
East Division
1st	St. Louis Cardinals	95	67	.586	--
2nd	New York Mets	92	70	.568	3
3rd	Montreal Expos	91	71	.562	4
4th	Philadelphia Phillies	80	82	.494	15
4th	Pittsburgh Pirates	80	82	.494	15
6th	Chicago Cubs	76	85	.472	18.5
West Division
1st	San Francisco Giants	90	72	.556	--
2nd	Cincinnati Reds	84	78	.519	6
3rd	Houston Astros	76	86	.469	14
4th	Los Angeles Dodgers	73	89	.451	17
5th	Atlanta Braves	69	92	.429	20.5
6th	San Diego Padres	65	97	.401	25

== Events ==
=== January ===
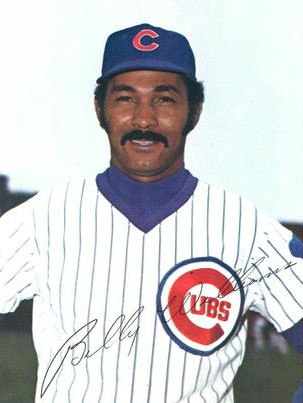
Hall of Famer Billy Williams in 1973

- January 5 – The New York Yankees acquire pitcher Pete Filson and infielder Randy Velarde from the Chicago White Sox in exchange for pitcher Scott Nielsen and minor-league infielder Mike Soper.
- January 6 – The second off-season of the collusion era resumes when right-hander Jim Clancy, a 14-game winner, agrees to return to the Toronto Blue Jays and infielder Phil Garner remains a member of the Houston Astros. Both had been part of the free-agent class of November 12, 1986. The signings occur two days before a deadline that will bar free-agent players from negotiating with their 1986 teams until May 1, 1987.
- January 7 – The Baltimore Orioles sign four-time former American League All-Star shortstop Rick Burleson, 35, granted free agency from the California Angels last November 12.
- January 8
  - The Angels re-sign two veteran starting players who had been granted free agency on November 12: third baseman Doug DeCinces and left-fielder Brian Downing. Both players are 36 and return to the defending AL West champions at today's signing deadline.
  - The New York Yankees re-sign two November 12 veteran free agents: pitcher Tommy John, 43, and second baseman Willie Randolph, 32, on "deadline day." John will win 13 games and Randolph will make the All-Star team for the 1987 Yankees.
  - Free-agent and starting catcher Ernie Whitt returns to the Toronto Blue Jays, accepting a "lesser contract" rather than wait until May 1 to re-open negotiations with the team. An "original Blue Jay," Whitt, 34, will start 113 games for Toronto in 1987, his 11th season.
  - The Cincinnati Reds trade starting center-fielder Eddie Milner to the San Francisco Giants for pitcher Frank Williams and two minor-league hurlers, Timber Mead and Mike Villa.
- January 9
  - The expiration of the "sign, sit out, or split" deadline imposed by the collusion-era CBA leaves these marquee November 12 free agents unable to continue contract talks with their 1986 teams until May 1: Doyle Alexander and Bob Horner (Atlanta Braves); Bob Boone (California Angels); André Dawson and Tim Raines, both future Hall of Famers (Montreal Expos); Rich Gedman (Boston Red Sox); Ron Guidry (New York Yankees); and Lance Parrish (Detroit Tigers). The eight have declined salary arbitration and opted to "test the market"—but have received no offers from teams other than their own.
  - The Minnesota Twins sign relief pitcher Juan Berenguer, who had been unconditionally released by the San Francisco Giants last December 19. Berenguer will win eight of nine decisions and add four saves for the surprising 1987 Twins.
- January 14 – The Baseball Writers' Association of America elects outfielder Billy Williams (354 votes) and pitcher Catfish Hunter (315) to the Hall of Fame.
- January 19 – The St. Louis Cardinals sign veteran left-handers Ken Dayley and Dave LaPoint; the Redbirds had unconditionally released Dayley on December 17; former Cardinal LaPoint had been released by the San Diego Padres on December 18.
- January 20
  - Left-hander Vida Blue returns to the site of his brilliant early career when the Oakland Athletics sign him as a free agent. Now 37, he had been granted freedom to test the market on November 12, 1986, after spending the past two seasons with the cross-bay San Francisco Giants. With Oakland, Blue had dazzled baseball with his breakthrough 1971 season (24–8, 1.72), and the 1971 American League Most Valuable Player and Cy Young Awards; he then posted two other 20-win seasons through 1976, and won three World Series rings. However, one month from today, Blue will abruptly retire from the game.
  - The Milwaukee Brewers obtain outfielder Brad Komminsk from the Atlanta Braves for outfielder Dion James.
- January 23 – Peter Bavasi steps down as president of the Cleveland Indians, months after the franchise's most successful season, on- and off- the field, since 1968. Bavasi, 44, spent two seasons as the Indians' chief executive and, despite 1986's results, proved to be an unpopular figure among fans and media.
- January 30 – The Chicago Cubs trade third baseman Ron Cey to the Oakland Athletics for infielder Luis Quiñones.

=== February ===
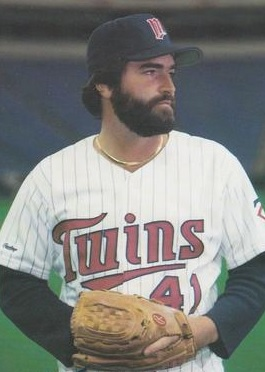
Jeff Reardon

- February 2 – The Toronto Blue Jays trade second baseman Dámaso García and pitcher Luis Leal to the Atlanta Braves for right-hander Craig McMurtry. García, 29, is a two-time former American League All-Star but a knee injury will sideline him for the entire 1987 season.
- February 3 – The Minnesota Twins acquire ace closer Jeff Reardon and catcher Tom Nieto from the Montreal Expos for pitchers Neal Heaton, Yorkis Pérez and Al Cardwood and catcher Jeff Reed. Reardon will win eight games and save 31 others for the 1987 Twins.
- February 4 – Lefty Atlee Hammaker, who missed the entire 1986 season with his second rotator cuff surgery, returns to the San Francisco Giants as a free agent. The former All-Star and National League ERA king, 29, will win ten games for the 1987 Giants.
- February 5 – The Giants add another southpaw, Joe Price, granted free agency from the Cincinnati Reds on November 12.
- February 6 – The Cleveland Indians sign catcher Rick Dempsey, 37, granted free agency from the Baltimore Orioles, also last November 12, after 11 seasons in Baltimore.
- February 12 – The Orioles sign third baseman and reigning World Series MVP Ray Knight, granted free agency from the New York Mets as part of the "Class of 1986". He reportedly signs for $600,000—which is $200,000 less than what the Mets had offered him before free agency.
- February 13
  - The Houston Astros sign left-hander Juan Agosto, unconditionally released by the Minnesota Twins last December 20.
  - Catcher Rick Cerone returns to the New York Yankees after a two-year absence; he had been granted free agency from the Milwaukee Brewers on November 12.
- February 16 – The Montreal Expos sign right-hander Pascual Pérez as a free agent. He had sat out last season after his April 1, 1986, release from the Atlanta Braves. Known for unpredictable behavior and struggles with drug addiction, Pérez will be recalled from Triple-A on August 22 and pitch brilliantly for the Expos, posting a 7–0 (2.30) record in ten starts through season's end.
- February 17 – The Cincinnati Reds obtain left-hander Guy Hoffman from the Chicago Cubs for infielder Wade Rowdon.
- February 20
  - The Major League Baseball Players Association files a new grievance—soon to be dubbed "Collusion II"—contending that the 26 MLB owners are acting in concert to hinder the bargaining power of the free-agent "Class of 1986," reducing salary and contract term offers, and restricting their ability to change teams. A previous grievance focusing on November 1985's free agents was filed one year ago.
  - The Minnesota Twins acquire utility infielder Al Newman from the Montreal Expos for minor-league pitcher Mike Shade. Newman will win two World Series rings (1987, 1991) as a Twin.
- February 23 – On the third day of spring training workouts in Fort Myers, Florida, Dick Howser resigns as manager of the Kansas City Royals. Battling brain cancer, Howser underwent surgeries in July and December 1986 with the goal of returning to the Royals' bench, but extreme fatigue takes its toll. Billy Gardner, former Minnesota Twins skipper, succeeds him. Howser will undergo brain surgery a third time in March; he succumbs at 51 on June 17. (See Deaths, below.)
- February 24 – Darrell Evans, who led the Detroit Tigers with 29 homers in 1986 before being released on December 20, agrees to return to the Tigers on an estimated $525,000 contract—a 33% pay cut. With collusion now an open secret, the 39-year-old veteran reportedly had no other teams interested in signing him.
- February 25
  - Baseball Commissioner Peter Ueberroth suspends San Diego Padres pitcher LaMarr Hoyt for the full 1987 season. Hoyt had been arrested on drug possession charges three times during 1986, and was sentenced to 45 days in jail on December 16. An arbitrator will cut Hoyt's suspension to sixty days on June 16 and order the Padres to reinstate him; the team, however, will release him unconditionally the next day. Hoyt will face a new drug possession charge in his native South Carolina in December 1987.
  - Strikeout-prone slugger Steve Balboni agrees to return to the Kansas City Royals for a reported 20% pay increase. Balboni, a free agent, had been released by the Royals on December 22.
- February 27 – Right-hander Bryn Smith, who slipped from 18 wins in 1985 to ten last season, then was released by the Montreal Expos on December 20, signs a free agent contract to return to the club for 1987. He takes a 33% pay cut.

=== March ===
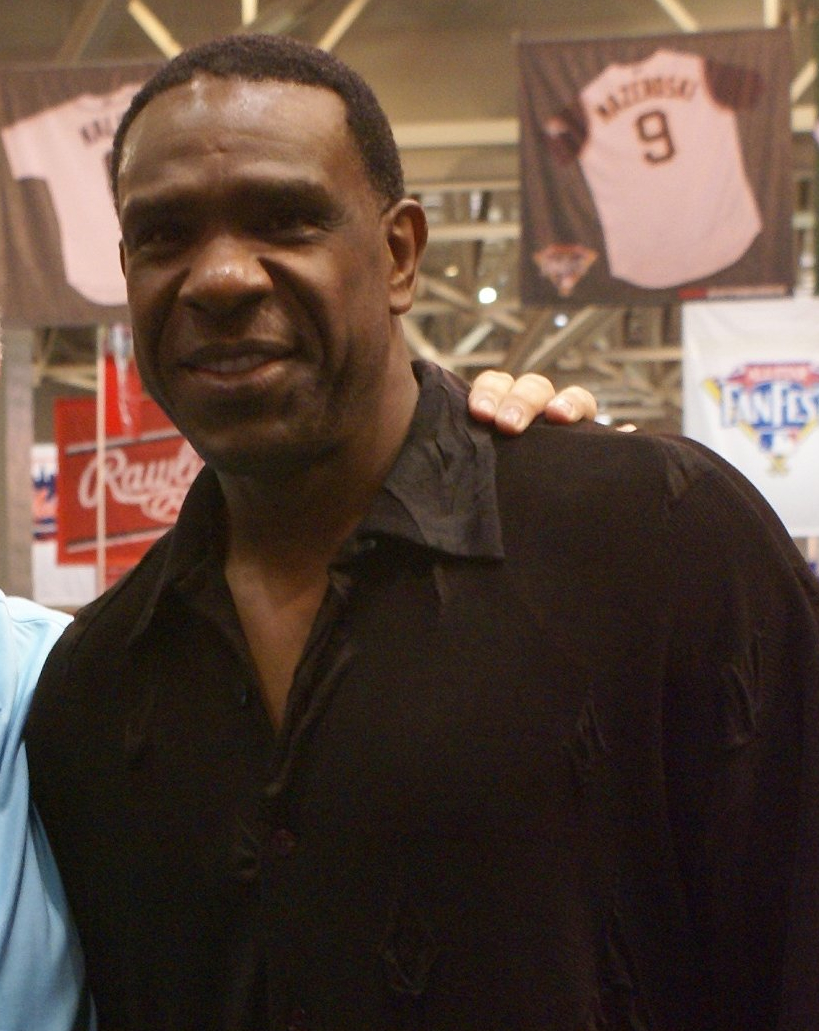
André Dawson in 2009

- March 3 – Ray Dandridge, 73, a third baseman and three-time All-Star who played mainly for Newark of the Negro National League between 1933 and 1944, is the only player elected to the National Baseball Hall of Fame and Museum by its Special Veterans Committee.
- March 6
  - The collusion-driven stalemate involving eight premier players granted free agency last November 12 is broken when the Chicago Cubs sign right-fielder and future Hall of Famer André Dawson, 32, to a one-year contract ultimately worth $700,000, including bonuses—a 33% cut from his 1986 compensation from the Montreal Expos. Dawson—who on March 2 had dared the Cubs to sign him for any price—will respond with a banner 1987 season: he leads the National League in home runs and runs batted in, and wins the NL MVP Award, a Gold Glove, and a berth on the All-Star team; he'll then ink a three-year, $6 million contract in 1988. The Cubs, however, finish last in the NL East.
  - Roger Clemens, the American League's reigning Most Valuable Player and Cy Young Award winner, walks out of the Boston Red Sox' spring training camp over a contract squabble; the pitcher seeks $1.3 million, and the club has offered $500,000. Boston's general manager, Lou Gorman, shrugs off the brouhaha, famously saying, "The sun will rise, the sun will set, and I'll have lunch." Clemens won't return to the Red Sox for 29 days; he will win 20 games and another Cy Young in 1987, but the Bosox finish under .500.
- March 13 – The Philadelphia Phillies sign catcher Lance Parrish; he becomes the second player among the "Unsigned Eight" elite free agents to receive a contract offer from a team other than his 1986 club—the result of collusion among the 26 MLB owners. Parrish, 30, is a ten-year veteran of the Detroit Tigers and six-time AL All-Star. His new contract pays him a lower base salary ($800,000 vs. $850,000) than he earned in Detroit, but incentives will edge the deal's AAV to $1 million.
- March 23 – The Cincinnati Reds sign outfielder/first baseman Terry Francona, granted free agency from the Chicago Cubs last October 18.
- March 26 – The Chicago White Sox trade pitcher Joe Cowley to the Philadelphia Phillies for outfielder Gary Redus. Cowley had won 11 games in 27 starts for Chicago in 1986, but he'll develop the "yips" as a Phillie, losing his first four starts, issuing 17 bases on balls and hitting two batters in only 112/3 innings pitched. He never again pitches in the majors after May 3, 1987.
- March 27
  - The New York Mets acquire right-hander David Cone and outfielder Chris Jelic from the Kansas City Royals for pitchers Rick Anderson and Mauro Gozzo and catcher Ed Hearn. Cone, 24, will win 81 games in a Met uniform between 1987 and 1992.
  - The Chicago White Sox send outfielder John Cangelosi to the Pittsburgh Pirates for hurler Jim Winn.
- March 30 – The Chicago Cubs obtain catcher Jim Sundberg from the Kansas City Royals for pitcher Dave Gumpert and outfielder Thad Bosley. Sundberg, 35, is a six-time former Gold Glove Award winner and 3x former All-Star.
- March 31 – The Minnesota Twins acquire outfielder Dan Gladden and minor-league pitcher Dave Blakley from the San Francisco Giants for three hurlers: Bryan Hickerson, José Domínguez and Ray Velasquez. In Minnesota, Gladden will play a key role on two (1987, 1991) world championship teams.

=== April ===
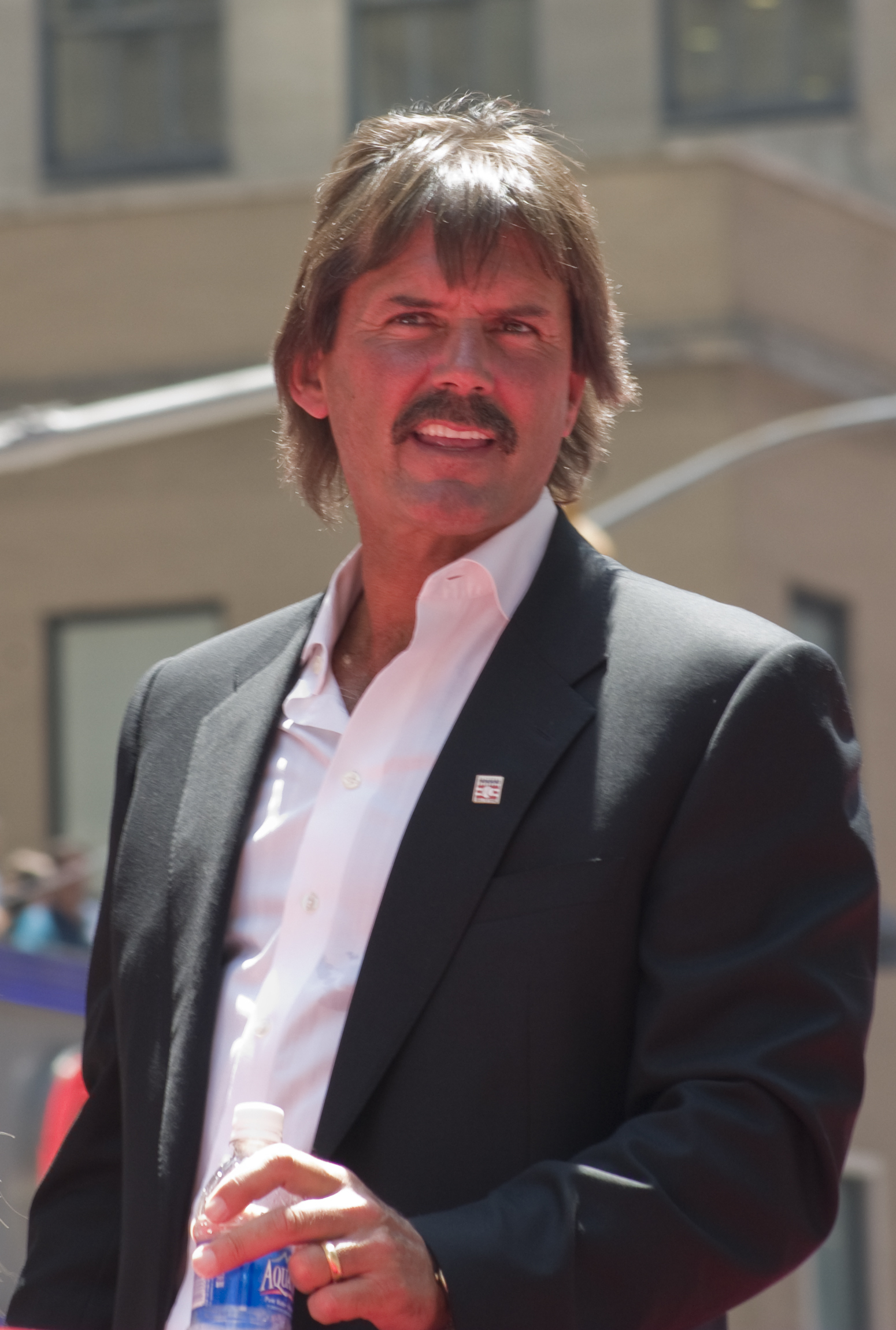
Dennis Eckersley at the 2008 MLB All-Star Game

- April 1 – A significant trade shakes up the NL East. The St. Louis Cardinals acquire four-time All-Star and 3x Gold-Glove-winning catcher Tony Peña from the division-rival Pittsburgh Pirates for pitcher Mike Dunne, catcher Mike LaValliere and outfielder Andy Van Slyke. Although Peña, 29 and in the prime of his career, has a subpar regular campaign in 1987, he helps the Cardinals return to the postseason, then bats a combined .395 (17-for-43) in 14 games during the NLCS and World Series. For the Bucs, Dunne, 24, wins 13 games and finishes second in 1987's NL Rookie of the Year balloting, LaValliere, 26, wins the Gold Glove Award, and Van Slyke, also 26, begins an eight-year stretch as the Pirates' standout center-fielder.
- April 3 – The Chicago Cubs trade struggling 32-year-old, 12-year-veteran starting pitcher Dennis Eckersley and infielder Dan Rohn to the Oakland Athletics for three minor leaguers: pitcher Mark Leonette, infielder/outfielder Brian Guinn, and outfielder Dave Wilder. The transaction will transform Eckersley's career. Reluctantly converted to a relief role by Oakland skipper Tony La Russa—he goes 0–2 (6.94) in two early-season spot starts—"Eck" becomes the Athletics' closer by season's end, then the most dominant reliever of his era, culminating as 1992's American League MVP and Cy Young-winner, and, ultimately, with his first-ballot induction into the Hall of Fame in 2004.
- April 6
  - Opening Day begins the Major League Baseball season with regular umpires on the field after a new contract, signed between the MLBUA and the American and National leagues, averts a work stoppage.
  - Al Campanis, general manager of the Los Angeles Dodgers and former teammate of Jackie Robinson's, appears on the ABC news program Nightline as the 40th anniversary of Robinson's historic breaking of MLB's color line approaches. Asked by host Ted Koppel if racial prejudice is the reason there are so few Black executives or managers in baseball, Campanis replies: "No, I don't believe it's prejudice. I truly believe that they may not have some of the, uh, necessities, uh, to be, uh, let's say, a field manager or perhaps a general manager." Koppel challenges the statement, then asks follow-up questions trying to "give you another chance to dig yourself out," but Campanis isn't able to do so. The interview causes a firestorm. Campanis, GM of the Dodgers since November 1968, is forced to resign two days later and replaced by executive vice president Fred Claire.
  - The Cardinals make another deal with the Pirates, purchasing the contract of right-handed hurler Lee Tunnell.
- April 10
  - Slugging former Atlanta Braves third baseman Bob Horner, a still-unsigned free agent whose market value has been warped by collusion, leaves "Organized Baseball" completely to sign a one-year, $2 million contract with the Yakult Swallows of the Central League of Nippon Professional Baseball. Horner, 29, who hit 215 home runs for the Braves between 1978 and 1986, will belt 31 long balls and bat .315 in 93 games for the Swallows this season.
  - Energetic utilityman Mickey Hatcher returns to his original organization, the Los Angeles Dodgers, as a free agent after his March 31 unconditional release from the Minnesota Twins. A two-time .300 hitter as a semi-regular with the Twins, Hatcher, 32, will play four seasons in his second Dodger stint, and be a prominent role player for the 1988 world champions.
- April 13 – At Jack Murphy Stadium, the San Diego Padres set a major league record when the first three batters in the bottom of the first inning hit home runs off San Francisco Giants starter Roger Mason in their home opener. The Padres, trailing 2–0, get homers from Marvell Wynne, Tony Gwynn and John Kruk; however, they still lose, 13–6.
- April 15
  - Nine days after the season has begun, Juan Nieves throws what will be the only MLB no-hitter of 1987. The Milwaukee Brewers' sophomore left-hander defeats the host Baltimore Orioles, 7–0, at Memorial Stadium. Nieves faces 31 hitters, fans seven, and issues five walks. At 22 years, four months and ten days old, he becomes the second-youngest pitcher in major league history to accomplish the feat—and the first Brewer to do it.
  - The same day as Nieves's no-no, Mike Scott, the Houston Astros' defending NL Cy Young Award winner, fires the first of the majors' 11 one-hitters of the year, besting the host Los Angeles Dodgers, 4–0. Mariano Duncan's third-inning single is the Dodgers' only safety.
- April 17 – Mike Schmidt of the Philadelphia Phillies hits the 500th home run of his career. It comes in the ninth inning against the Pittsburgh Pirates' Don Robinson, giving the Phillies an 8–6 win at Three Rivers Stadium.
- April 21 – The Chicago White Sox defeat the Milwaukee Brewers, 7–1, at Comiskey Park, ending the Brew Crew's season-opening 13-game winning streak. En route, Milwaukee has swept the defending AL champion Boston Red Sox, Baltimore Orioles, and Texas Rangers (twice). After today's loss, the Brewers will sweep the Orioles again—bringing their mark to 17–1 (.944) on April 27.
- April 25 – Detroit Tigers' rookie Billy Bean hits safely four times—including two doubles—in his major-league debut, becoming the 13th player ever to accomplish the feat.
- April 29 – André Dawson of the Chicago Cubs hits for the cycle (including his sixth homer of the new season) in an 8–4 triumph over the San Francisco Giants at Wrigley Field.

=== May ===
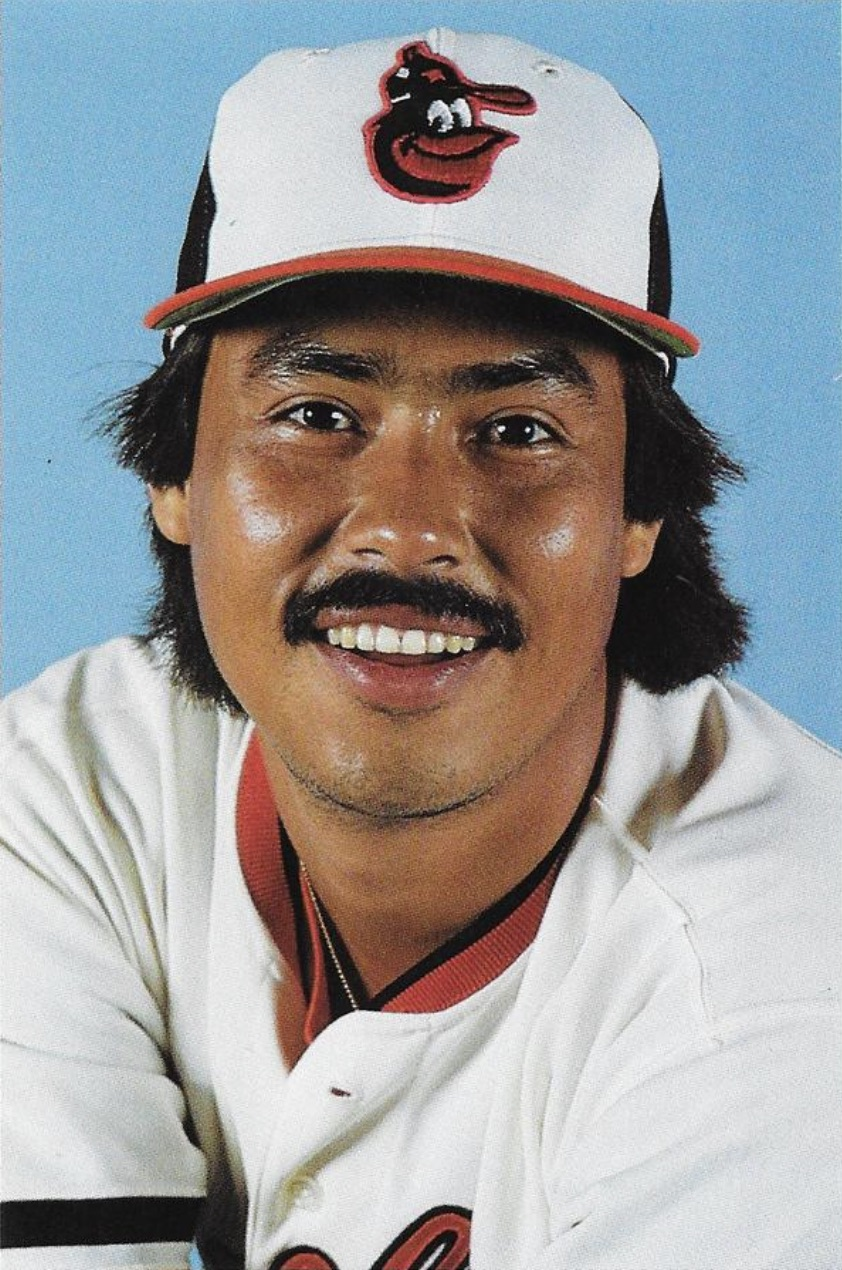
Dennis Martínez in 1983

- May 1–5 – The five remaining unsigned élite free agents, still in collusion limbo and prohibited until now from signing with their 1986 teams, all return to their former clubs. Three sign new contracts on May 1: Tim Raines—reigning National League batting champion and future Hall of Famer—with the Montreal Expos; former ace left-hander Ron Guidry with the New York Yankees; and catcher Bob Boone with the California Angels. On May 2, catcher Rich Gedman rejoins the Boston Red Sox. Then, on May 5, pitcher Doyle Alexander returns to the Atlanta Braves. An arbitrator will later rule that major league owners conspired together, in an attempt to keep player salaries low, to destroy the free agent marketplace.
- May 4 – Candy Maldonado of the San Francisco Giants hits for the cycle in a 10–7 triumph over the St. Louis Cardinals at Busch Memorial Stadium.
- May 6 – Pitcher Dennis Martínez returns to the Montreal Expos on a $162,500 one-year contract after being granted free agency on November 9, 1986, and is assigned to Triple-A. The Nicaraguan right-hander, 32, will be recalled June 10 and go 11–4 (3.30) in 22 starts, the start of a comeback that will see him make three National League All-Star teams and pitch a perfect game over the next seven seasons.
- May 12 – The Cleveland Indians send outfielder Dave Gallagher to the Seattle Mariners for right-hander Mark Huismann.
- May 15 – The Texas Rangers deal southpaw hurler Mike Mason to the Chicago Cubs for a "player to be named later;" right-hander Dave Pavlas is set to the Rangers June 6 to complete the transaction.
- May 17 – Outfielder Lonnie Smith, granted free agency from the Kansas City Royals last November 12, returns to Kansas City on a $500,000 one-year contract.
- May 22 – The Baltimore Orioles trade pitcher Brad Havens and outfielder John Shelby to the Los Angeles Dodgers for relief pitcher Tom Niedenfuer.
- May 23 – In one of 1987's two longest extra-inning games, the Chicago Cubs outlast the Atlanta Braves, 7–6 at Wrigley Field, when Jerry Mumphrey plates Ryne Sandberg with a game-winning double in the 16th.
- May 29 – The Los Angeles Dodgers release third baseman Bill Madlock. The four-time former NL batting champ, now 36, is hitting only .180 in 61 at bats this season.

=== June ===
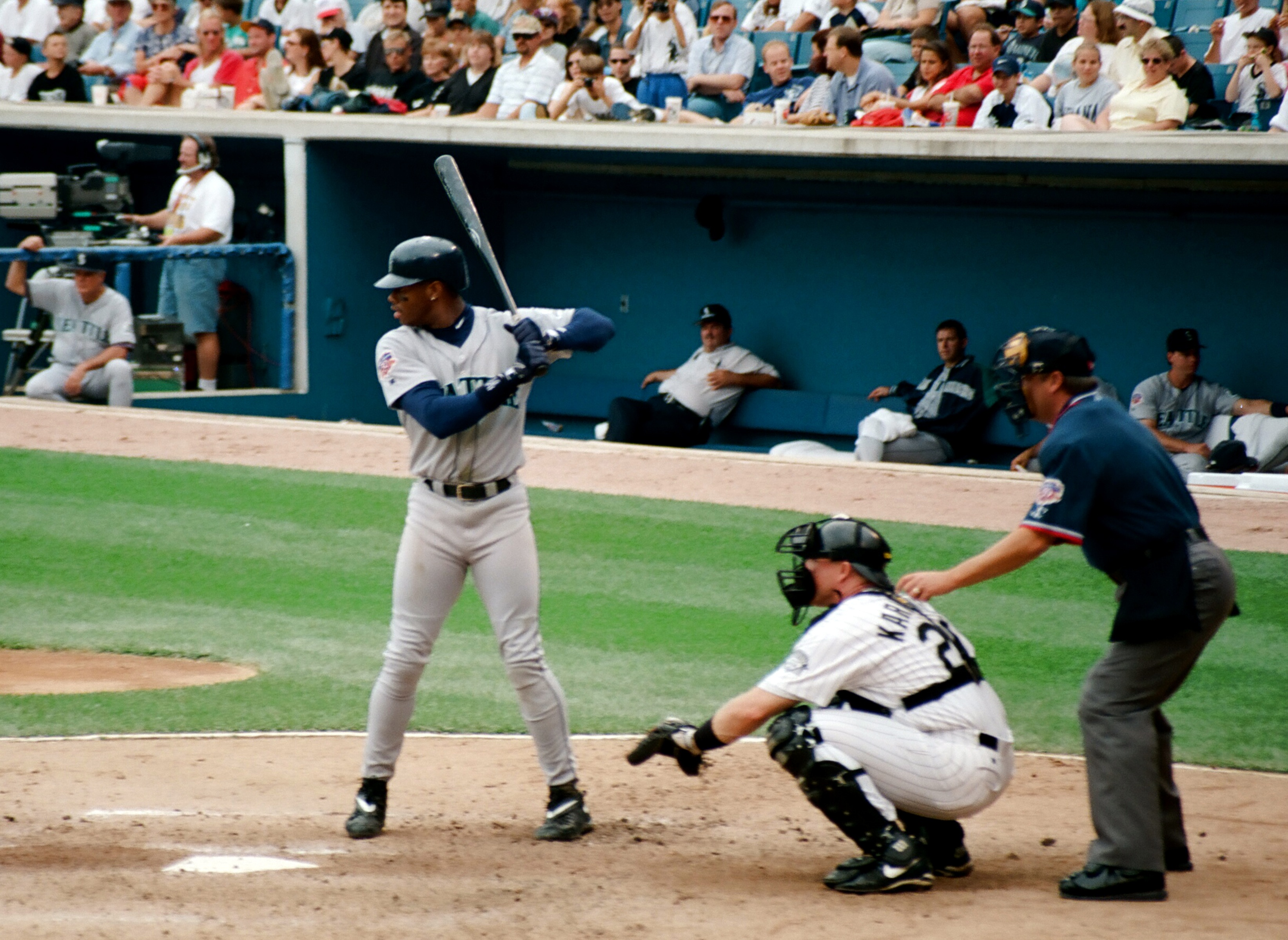
Ken Griffey Jr. in 1997

- June 1 – Knuckleballer Phil Niekro of the Cleveland Indians beats the Detroit Tigers, 9–6, for his 314th career MLB victory. With younger brother Joe currently boasting 216 victories, the Niekros become the winningest pitching brother duo, surpassing the 529 wins posted by Gaylord and Jim Perry. The Niekros will finish their careers in April 1988 with a combined 539 wins.
- June 2 – The Seattle Mariners use the first overall selection of the 1987 MLB draft to select future 13-time All-Star, 10x Gold Glover, 1997 American League MVP, and first-ballot Hall of Famer Ken Griffey Jr., signaling a turnaround in their fortunes as an organization. With the 22nd pick, the Houston Astros select another Cooperstown-bound player, Craig Biggio, then a catcher.
- June 2–3 – At the "Friendly Confines" of Wrigley Field, the Chicago Cubs trounce the Astros on successive days, 13–2 and 22–7, behind seven-RBI games from André Dawson, then Keith Moreland.
- June 5 – Dwight Gooden returns to the New York Mets after participating in a substance abuse treatment program and makes his first start of 1987. Before a crowd of 51,402 at Shea Stadium, he goes 62/3 innings and defeats the Pittsburgh Pirates, 5–1.
- June 6
  - With their starting rotation decimated by injuries and Gooden's absence, the Mets seek help from free-agent franchise icon Tom Seaver, 42, who signs a conditional contract today; but Seaver is hit hard during an exhibition game against the Triple-A Tidewater Tides on June 11. After similarly poor outings on the 16th and 20th, he will formally retire on the 22nd.
  - The Minnesota Twins acquire Joe Niekro (3–4) from the New York Yankees for catcher/DH Mark Salas (.378 in 22 games).
- June 10
  - The Yankees reacquire veteran DH/outfielder Mike Easler from the Philadelphia Phillies for third baseman Shane Turner and outfielder Keith Hughes. The Bombers had traded Easler, 36, to the Phils last December.
  - The San Diego Padres name longtime executive Chub Feeney club president. Feeney, 65, spent over four decades in senior front office positions as a vice president of the New York/San Francisco Giants (1946–1969) and president of the National League (1970–1986). He succeeds former prexy Ballard Smith, who is the son-in-law of owner Joan Kroc.
- June 17 – Both benches clear twice during a pair of brawls in the sixth inning of today's 8–5 Milwaukee Brewers victory over the Minnesota Twins at County Stadium. The first is touched off when the Twins' Steve Lombardozzi is hit by a Mark Clear pitch following Gene Larkin's homer; the benches empty, but neither the batter nor the pitcher are ejected: instead, Lombardozzi's teammate, Dan Gladden, who challenges Clear to a fight, is bounced by umpire (and former professional wrestler) Ken Kaiser. The second donnybrook breaks out one batter later, when baserunner Lombardozzi slides hard into the Brewers' Jim Gantner and the two wrestle at second base; this time, Kaiser ejects Gantner and Twins' coach Tony Oliva.
- June 18 – The Phillies, 29–32 and 9½ games behind the St. Louis Cardinals in the NL East, fire third-year manager John Felske. Coach Lee Elia, known for his previous stint as manager of the 1982–1983 Chicago Cubs, is named interim skipper.
- June 24 – The Minnesota Twins obtain veteran southpaw Dan Schatzeder from the Phillies for hurler Danny Clay and corner infielder Tom Schwarz. Schatzeder, 32, has a lackluster regular season for the Twins, but his crucial Game 6 win in the 1987 World Series will pave the way for their seven-game Fall Classic triumph over the St. Louis Cardinals.
- June 28 – Don Baylor of the visiting Boston Red Sox is hit by a pitch from Rick Rhoden in the sixth inning of a 6–2 win over the New York Yankees. The HBP gives Baylor 244 for his career, breaking a modern-day record set by Ron Hunt.

=== July ===
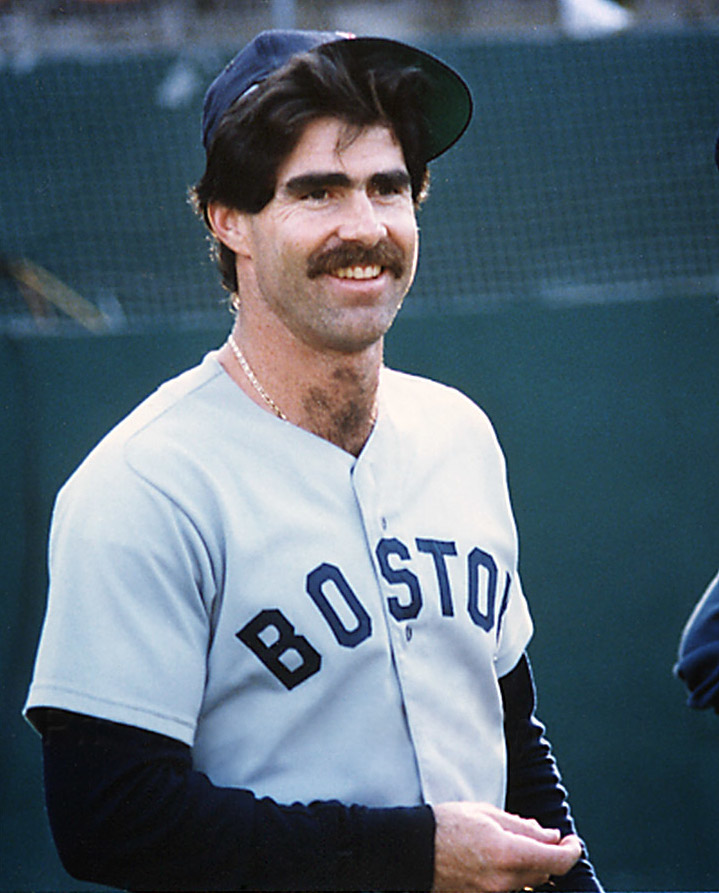
Bill Buckner

- July 1
  - The California Angels sign veteran outfielder Tony Armas, granted free agency from the Boston Red Sox last November 12.
  - The Chicago White Sox sign pitcher LaMarr Hoyt as a free agent; he had been released by the San Diego Padres on June 17. Arrested three times on drug-related charges during 1986, Hoyt, 32, is expected to begin his comeback in Class A this season—but the 1983 American League Cy Young Award winner's baseball career is over.
- July 3 – The Kansas City Royals induct their late manager, Dick Howser, and former infielder Cookie Rojas and starting pitcher Paul Splittorff, into their Hall of Fame. They also retire Howser's uniform #10—the first officially retired number in franchise history.
- July 5 – In a blockbuster trade within the NL West, the San Francisco Giants obtain pitchers Dave Dravecky and Craig Lefferts and outfielder Kevin Mitchell from the San Diego Padres for pitchers Keith Comstock, Mark Davis and Mark Grant and third baseman and 1986 National League All-Star Chris Brown. In Mitchell's 4½ seasons in San Francisco, he will bash 153 home runs, make two All-Star teams, win the 1989 NL Most Valuable Player Award, and help the Giants reach the postseason twice. In San Diego, Davis will post two All-Star seasons (1988–1989) as a relief pitcher, culminating in the 1989 NL Cy Young Award.
- July 7 – At Wrigley Field, umpire Gary Darling ejects six Chicago Cubs in a beanball war with the San Diego Padres. Hostilities break out in the home half of the third when, after the Cubs' third homer of the game, Padre hurler Eric Show hits slugger André Dawson in the face with a pitch. As Dawson lies injured at home plate, the Cubs' Rick Sutcliffe charges Show from his dugout, emptying benches and bullpens. Then an enraged Dawson goes after Show, chasing the pitcher (and umpire Charlie Williams, who's escorting Show off the field) into the Padre dugout. The "chin music" continues in later innings when the retaliating Cubs hit San Diego's Benito Santiago with a pitch and throw behind newly acquired Chris Brown. Sutcliffe, Dawson, Greg Maddux, Scott Sanderson, manager Gene Michael and acting skipper Johnny Oates are all evicted from the premises. No Padres are ejected. The Cubs win the game, 7–5.
- July 12
  - Three of the four MLB divisions are in play at the All-Star break. In the AL West, the surprising Minnesota Twins (49–40) lead the Kansas City Royals and Oakland Athletics (both 46–41) by two games. In the NL West, the Cincinnati Reds (47–41) hold a 2½-game edge over the Houston Astros (44–43), with another surprise team, the San Francisco Giants (44–44), only three back. In the AL East, the New York Yankees (55–34) boast a three-length advantage over the Toronto Blue Jays (51–36), with the Detroit Tigers (48–37) five games out. Only the NL East, with the St. Louis Cardinals (56–30) in possession of MLB's best record, seems a runaway; they're nine games in front of second-place Montreal (47–39). The defending champion New York Mets (47–40) are third, 9½ back.
  - Left-hander Steve Howe, the 1979 NL Rookie of the Year and former All-Star reliever, signs a free agent contract with the Texas Rangers. Howe, whose struggle with drug and alcohol addiction has disrupted his baseball career, had spent 1986 pitching for an unaffiliated Class A team; his last MLB appearance had come on September 10, 1985. Now 29, he'll be back on a big-league mound on August 7.
- July 13 – The New York Yankees obtain southpaw starter Steve Trout from the Chicago Cubs for three pitchers: Rich Scheid, Bob Tewksbury and Dean Wilkins. In 11 starts for the Cubs this year, Trout, 29, is 6–3 (3.00) with three complete games and two shutouts; however, as a Yankee, he will go winless in four decisions and his ERA will more than double, to 6.60, through the rest of the season.
- July 14 – Tim Raines caps a three-for-three performance in the All-Star Game with a two-run triple in the top of the 13th inning, giving the National League a 2–0 victory over the American League. Raines is selected the MVP.
- July 17 – The Cleveland Indians, in the midst of a crushingly disappointing season (31–56, last in the AL East, and 23 games out of first), fire manager Pat Corrales and replace him with coach Doc Edwards. Corrales, 46, had led Cleveland to a 280–355–2 (.441) mark since becoming pilot on July 31, 1983. Edwards, 50, is a former Indians' catcher who spent four years (1982–1985) as their Triple-A manager.
- July 15 – Ron Cey is released by the Oakland Athletics, bringing an end to Cey's 17 year career.
- July 18 – New York Yankees first baseman Don Mattingly homers in his record-tying eighth straight game, a 7–2 Texas Rangers win at Arlington Stadium. He matches the record established by Dale Long in 1956.
- July 19 – The Rangers put up 22 hits, including a four-for-four performance by second baseman Jerry "The Governor" Browne, and stagger the visiting Yankees, 20–3. The 20 runs are the highest for an AL team in 1987; the 22 safeties will be equaled by Cleveland on September 5, while the Philadelphia Phillies will also collect 22 knocks in 13 innings on August 11 to lead NL teams.
- July 23 – The Boston Red Sox (43–52), defending AL champions mired in fifth place in their division, unconditionally release first baseman Bill Buckner, whose error in Game 6 helped turn the tide of the 1986 World Series. Buckner, 37, is batting .273 with only two homers in 75 games for Boston this season; he will sign with the California Angels on July 28.
- July 30 – The St. Louis Cardinals deal southpaw Dave LaPoint to the Chicago White Sox for minor-league hurler Bryce Hulstrom.
- July 31
  - The San Francisco Giants, just three games from first place in the NL West, acquire veteran right-hander Don Robinson from the Pittsburgh Pirates for catcher Mackey Sasser and $50,000. Robinson, 30, will win five games and save seven others coming out of the Giants' bullpen, to help them win the division title.
  - Hall-of-Fame left-hander Steve Carlton, now 42 and a 23-year MLB veteran, is dealt from the Cleveland Indians to the Minnesota Twins for a "PTBNL," minor-league hurler Jeff Perry. Carlton will appear in only nine regular-season games, with seven starts, for the Twins, and contribute only one victory in their drive to the American League pennant. He'll retire in 1988 with 329 career victories.

=== August ===
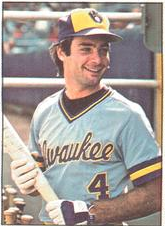
Paul Molitor

- August 2 – At Royals Stadium, Kevin Seitzer goes six-for-six with two home runs and seven runs batted in the Kansas City Royals' 13–5 victory over the Boston Red Sox. Seitzer becomes the second Royal to collect six hits in one game, Bob Oliver having done so in 1969, the franchise's inaugural season.
- August 3 – With the California Angels batting in the fourth against the visiting Minnesota Twins, umpires converge on the mound to inspect the uniform and equipment of Twins' hurler Joe Niekro. Opponents suspect Niekro of "doctoring" the baseball; tonight, umpires have quietly collected five scuffed balls as possible evidence. Niekro reaches into his pockets, throws his hands in the air—and an emery board and a small piece of sandpaper fly to the ground. Niekro is ejected and ultimately suspended for ten games by American League president Bobby Brown. The undeterred Twins, on their way to the AL West title, win, 11–3. Although he maintains his innocence, Niekro will appear on Late Night With David Letterman on August 14, where he hilariously spoofs the incident, and videos of his flying emery board will become a staple of ensuing baseball blooper reels.
- August 7 – The Detroit Tigers, embroiled in a three-team divisional scramble in the AL East, swap third basemen with the Pittsburgh Pirates, sending Darnell Coles, 25, to Pittsburgh for veteran Jim Morrison, 34. Coles has been in a season-long slump and lost his regular job to Tom Brookens, but Morrison's offensive struggles this month will cement Brookens' role as the Tigers' starting third baseman.
- August 9 – Seeking pitching depth for the pennant drive, the Toronto Blue Jays—who are fighting the Tigers and New York Yankees for supremacy in the AL East—obtain 48-year-old, future Hall of Famer Phil Niekro from the Cleveland Indians for pitcher Don Gordon (PTBNL) and minor-league outfielder Darryl Landrum. Niekro is struggling through his 24th and last MLB season; he will go 0–2 (8.25) in only 12 innings pitched and three games for Toronto before he's released August 31, and allowed to finish his career with his former and longtime employers, the Atlanta Braves.
- August 10 – Today at Veterans Stadium, with Joe Niekro's suspension still in the limelight, crew chief John Kibler ejects Philadelphia Phillies pitcher Kevin Gross for illegally scuffing baseballs after sandpaper is discovered glued to his glove. Gene Michael, manager of the opposing Chicago Cubs, called the umpires' attention to the infraction in the fifth inning. The National League office suspends Gross for ten games.
- August 11
  - Mark McGwire of the Oakland Athletics breaks Al Rosen's American League rookie record by hitting his 38th home run in an 8–2 loss to the Seattle Mariners.
  - Murray Cook, general manager of the Montreal Expos since September 1984, resigns his post for "personal and family" reasons. Former Expos pitcher Bill Stoneman succeeds him, with future GM Dave Dombrowski promoted to assistant general manager.
- August 12 – In a deal that will decide a divisional race for one team and turn the other into perennial pennant contenders, the Tigers acquire veteran right-hander Doyle Alexander from the Braves for 20-year-old hurler John Smoltz. Alexander, 36, will go 9–0 (1.53) in 11 starts (and 881/3 innings) for the rest of the regular season before faltering in the 1987 ALCS. Smoltz, only 4–10 (5.68) in 21 games for Double-A Glens Falls when today's deal is made, will win 210 games as a Brave, while making eight National League All-Star teams, capturing a Cy Young Award, and earning both a World Series ring and election to the Baseball Hall of Fame.
- August 16
  - Tim Raines hits for the cycle in the Expos' 10–7 victory over the Pittsburgh Pirates at Olympic Stadium to complete a four-game sweep of the Bucs and keep the Expos (66–51, four games out) in contention in the NL East.
  - The New York Mets rough up sophomore right-hander Greg Maddux for seven earned runs in 32/3 innings en route to a 23–10 romp over the Chicago Cubs at Wrigley Field. The Mets' 23 runs scored are the most by an MLB team in 1987. The defeat drops future first-ballot Hall of Famer Maddux's record to 6–11 (5.25). The 21-year-old's growing pains will end in 1988, when he wins 18 games and begins his run of pitching dominance.
- August 21 – Beginning today in a dead heat for the NL West lead (with the Cincinnati Reds), the San Francisco Giants (63–59) acquire "Big Daddy"—starting pitcher Rick Reuschel—from the Pittsburgh Pirates for hurlers Scott Medvin and Jeff Robinson. Reuschel, 38, will win five games down the stretch, while the Giants play .675 ball and capture their first divisional crown since 1971 by six full games.
- August 26
  - Future Hall of Famer Paul Molitor of the Milwaukee Brewers goes hitless against five Cleveland Indians hurlers in a 10–9 Brewer win, and ends his 39-game hitting streak—the longest in the American League since Joe DiMaggio's 56 straight games (the major league record) in 1941. Molitor's skein began July 16; he went 68-for-164 (.415) with seven homers, 17 doubles and three triples; he also walked 22 times.
  - Former catcher John Wathan replaces Billy Gardner at the helm of the Kansas City Royals, who are 62–64 but only 3½ games out of the lead in the AL West. Wathan, 37, is promoted from Triple-A Omaha after batting coach Hal McRae, an African-American and the club's first choice, turns down the job. Gardner, who became the Royals' skipper when terminally ill Dick Howser stepped aside during spring training, had held the post for only six months and three days.
  - The New York Yankees and Cincinnati Reds trade struggling pitchers, with the Bombers sending lefty Dennis Rasmussen to Cincinnati for right-hander Bill Gullickson.
- August 29
  - The Oakland Athletics acquire left-hander Rick Honeycutt from the Los Angeles Dodgers for a "player to be named later." The PTBNL turns out to be former top draft choice Tim Belcher, still a minor leaguer, who is added to the deal September 3. Oakland is tied for first in the AL West and seeks to strengthen its pitching staff with veteran southpaw Honeycutt, 33, who is only 2–12 (4.59) in 27 games with Los Angeles; Belcher, 25, who has spent the year in Triple-A, with have a strong MLB debut with the Dodgers, going 4–2 (2.38) in six September games.
  - The Pittsburgh Pirates deal hard-hitting second baseman Johnny Ray to the California Angels for minor-league corner infielder Bill Merrifield and pitcher Miguel García (PTBNL).
- August 30
  - The Athletics add more pitching, sending two PTBNLs (pitcher Dave Leiper and first baseman Rob Nelson) to the San Diego Padres for right-hander Storm Davis.
  - Future Hall of Famer Kirby Puckett goes six-for-six, including two homers, scores four runs and knocks in four, leading the Minnesota Twins to a 10–6 victory over the Milwaukee Brewers at County Stadium.
  - With knuckleball pitcher Charlie Hough on the mound, Texas Rangers catcher Geno Petralli ties a Major League record by committing six passed balls in a 7–0 loss to the Detroit Tigers at Tiger Stadium. All seven runs are unearned and come as a result of the passed balls. Petralli commits 35 passed balls on the season, breaking J. C. Martin's modern-day single-season record of 33 in 1965.
- August 31
  - The sixth-place Baltimore Orioles trade veteran left-hander Mike Flanagan to the contending Toronto Blue Jays for right-handers Oswaldo Peraza and José Mesa (PTBNL). Former Cy Young Award winner (1979) Flanagan, 35, has won 139 games for Baltimore since 1975 and owns a World Series ring.
  - The Kansas City Royals, battling for first in the AL West, obtain 18-year MLB veteran relief pitcher Gene Garber from the Atlanta Braves for catcher Terry Bell (PTBNL).
  - The St. Louis Cardinals trade lefty Pat Perry to the Cincinnati Reds for right-hander Scott Terry (PTBNL).

=== September ===
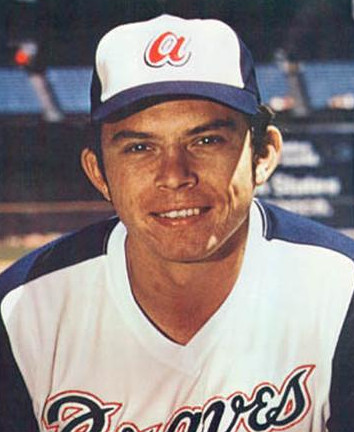
A 27-year-old Darrell Evans in 1974

- September 1
  - The defending American League champions, the Boston Red Sox, now 15 full games out of first place and five games under .500, continue to shed veteran members of their 1986 roster, shipping postseason heroes Dave Henderson and Don Baylor to separate contenders for players to be named later. Henderson, 29, is traded to the San Francisco Giants for fellow outfielder Randy Kutcher, and DH Baylor, 38, is swapped to the Minnesota Twins for pitching prospect Enrique Rios. Baylor will star for the Twins in the 1987 postseason, going seven-for-21 with a home run and winning a World Series ring.
  - In a season that's seen pitchers Joe Niekro and Kevin Gross punished for altering baseballs, hitter Billy Hatcher of the Houston Astros is thrown out of today's game at Wrigley Field by umpire John McSherry for using a corked bat—which splits open upon contact to reveal the illegal substance. Although Hatcher claims he borrowed the bat from a teammate, Dave Smith, he's suspended for ten days by National League president A. Bartlett Giamatti.
- September 6 – The Los Angeles Dodgers push over an unearned run in the home half of the 16th to defeat the New York Mets, 3–2, in one of the majors' two longest games (by innings) of 1987. Tim Belcher, making his big-league debut, hurls two shutout innings for the win.
- September 7 – Labor Day weekend ends with races all in four MLB divisions. The closest is in the AL East, where the Toronto Blue Jays (83–54) lead the Detroit Tigers (82–54) by a half game. In the AL West, the Minnesota Twins (74–65) have a three-game advantage over the Oakland Athletics (70–67). In the NL East, the St. Louis Cardinals (81–55) lead the Mets (78–59) by 3½ lengths. Meanwhile, in the NL West, the San Francisco Giants (74–64) have moved 4½ games ahead of their nearest rival, now the Houston Astros (69–68).
- September 8 – Unwilling to wait to be fired, Chicago Cubs manager Gene Michael quits before completing his first full season. His team began the campaign 23–14, but has slumped to a 68–68 mark, 13 full games behind the Cardinals; what's more, he's at odds with general manager (GM) Dallas Green. Michael, 49, departs with a record of 114–124 since taking over the Cubs on June 14, 1986. He ultimately will return to the New York Yankees and their front office, where he'll be a key architect of the Joe Torre-era dynasty that begins in 1996.
- September 9
  - Nolan Ryan strikes out 16 to pass 4,500 for his career as the Houston Astros beat the San Francisco Giants 4–2. Ryan strikes out 12 of the final 13 batters and fans Mike Aldrete to complete the seventh inning for his 4,500th strikeout.
  - The Cubs appoint scout and former big-league skipper Frank Lucchesi, 61, their acting manager. He will guide the team to an 8–17 (.320) mark and last place finish from today through the end of the 1987 campaign.
- September 11 – The year's longest consecutive-scoreless-innings-pitched streak ends at 331/3 when Teddy Higuera of the Milwaukee Brewers allows a fifth-inning solo shot to Tom Brookens of the Detroit Tigers. Milwaukee still prevails, 5–2, with Higuera improving to 16–9 (3.79).
- September 14 – In the midst of the Toronto Blue Jays' 18–3 drubbing of the Baltimore Orioles at Exhibition Stadium, Cal Ripken Jr. is lifted from the lineup and replaced by Ron Washington, stopping Ripken's consecutive innings played streak at 8,243. In this same game, Toronto hits ten home runs to set a Major League single-game record. Ernie Whitt connects on three of the home runs, Rance Mulliniks and George Bell two each, and Fred McGriff, Lloyd Moseby and Rob Ducey one each.
- September 15 – The Cincinnati Reds' Dave Parker puts up one of the most impressive offensive displays of the year, going five for five, scoring four runs, and knocking in eight (most by an MLB player in 1987) in a 21–6 beatdown of the Atlanta Braves at Fulton County Stadium.
- September 18 – Darrell Evans hits his 30th home run of the season, and becomes the first player to do so after the age of 40. The blow enables Evans's Detroit Tigers to eke out a one-run victory over the Milwaukee Brewers, and maintain their half-game edge on the Toronto Blue Jays in the AL East.
- September 21
  - Arbitrator Thomas T. Roberts rules against MLB owners and in favor of the Players' Association in "Collusion I", a grievance filed in February 1986 by the union that contended that owners are violating the existing collective bargaining agreement by acting together to restrict free-agent bidding, and reduce contract terms and salaries. The "remedy" for the owners' actions is not yet announced, and a second grievance—"Collusion II", filed this past February—remains under review before a different arbitrator. Collusion will ultimately cost the owners $280 million in compensation to players, and contribute to bitterness that results in the catastrophic 1994–1995 Major League Baseball strike.
  - Darryl Strawberry steals his 30th base of 1987 to join the 30–30 club. With New York Mets teammate Howard Johnson already a club "member," this marks the first time that two teammates achieve 30–30 seasons in the same year.
  - The Chicago Cubs send pitcher Dickie Noles to the Detroit Tigers for a player to be named later. When the trade is completed on October 23, that "PTBNL" is Noles—making him, at the time, the third man MLB history to be traded for himself.
- September 22
  - Wade Boggs of the Boston Red Sox reaches the 200-hit mark for the fifth straight season in an 8–5 loss to the Detroit Tigers. The future Hall of Famer will win his fourth AL batting title (.363) in 1987.
  - The Toronto Blue Jays acquire pitching prospect Juan Guzmán from the Los Angeles Dodgers for rookie infielder Mike Sharperson. Both players will contribute to World Series championships for their new teams: Guzmán in 1992 and 1993, and Sharperson in 1988.
- September 23 – Albert Hall of the Atlanta Braves becomes the fourth MLB player to hit for the cycle in 1987 in a 5–4 triumph over the Houston Astros. His lead-off triple in the home half of the ninth, which completes the cycle, becomes the winning run when Hall soon scores on a wild pitch to break the four-all tie.
- September 27
  - Four days after being signed as a free agent by his original team, 48-year-old Phil Niekro hurls in his final major league game for the Atlanta Braves before 26,019 home fans; the Braves temporarily "unretire" Niekro's #35 for the future Hall of Famer. Starting against the San Francisco Giants, he goes three-plus innings and gives up six hits and five runs. He does not earn a decision.
  - The Giants (now 85–70) romp in the contest, 15–6, and clinch the 1987 NL West title for their first postseason appearance since 1971 and only their third in 30 seasons in San Francisco.
- September 28
  - The Minnesota Twins, who finished next-to-last in their division in 1986, clinch the AL West championship by defeating the Texas Rangers, 5–3, at Arlington Stadium. The win gives Minnesota (85–72) a seven-game advantage; however, they will falter going into the 1987 ALCS by dropping their final five games of the regular season.
  - Kevin Seitzer becomes the first rookie since Tony Oliva and Dick Allen in 1964 to collect 200 hits in a season.
- September 29 – The Baltimore Orioles release outfielder Alan Wiggins, suspended August 31 after a failed drug test. The release ends his professional baseball career. In 1991, at age 32, Wiggins will become the first MLB player to die from AIDS, which he contracted through intravenous drug use.

=== October ===
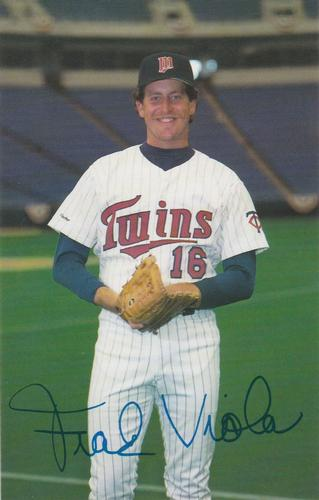
Frank Viola

- October 1
  - The St. Louis Cardinals punch their ticket to the post-season, winning their second National League East Division crown in three seasons and third since 1982, with an 8–2 triumph over the Montreal Expos at Busch Memorial Stadium. St. Louis (now 94–65) will face the San Francisco Giants in the 1987 NLCS.
  - The Atlanta Braves pull off a rare triple steal. It begins when Gerald Perry attempts a delayed theft of home in a game against the Houston Astros. Houston catcher Ronn Reynolds fails to properly field the throw from pitcher Danny Darwin. As Perry scrambles for home, Ken Oberkfell advances from second base to third, and Jeff Blauser advances from first to second.
- October 2 – In the opening game of their three-game showdown, the onrushing Detroit Tigers climb into a flat-footed tie with the injury-riddled Toronto Blue Jays for the American League East lead with a 4–3 victory over Toronto before 45,167 hometown fans. All seven runs score in the first three innings; ex-Blue Jay Doyle Alexander earns his ninth straight win to remain undefeated. Both clubs are now 96–64. Just six days ago, Toronto led the race by 3½ games; staggered by the losses of All-Star shortstop Tony Fernández and starting catcher Ernie Whitt, the Jays have now lost five straight games.
- October 3 – Alan Trammell's 12th-inning RBI single is decisive as his Tigers (now 97–64) jump into the undisputed AL East lead with their 3–2 triumph over the Blue Jays (96–65). Veteran southpaw Mike Flanagan pitches heroically in defeat for Toronto, allowing only one unearned run in 11 innings of work.
- October 4 – Another seasoned left-hander, 14-year MLB veteran and Detroit native Frank Tanana, fires a complete-game, six-hit, 1–0 shutout to lead the Tigers to a sweep of the Blue Jays and the division title. Larry Herndon's second-inning homer delivers the game's only run. Detroit's third consecutive one-run victory is Toronto's seventh straight loss and enables the Tigers to finish two games up in the standings. The Tigers will face the Minnesota Twins in the ALCS.
- October 5 – Saying he's tired of seeing his Baltimore Orioles "lose and lose and lose", club owner Edward Bennett Williams fires Hank Peters, the club's general manager (GM) since November 1975. Peters, 63, twice won The Sporting News Executive of the Year Award during his 12 years in office—with two pennants and a World Series (1983)—but Baltimore has gone 140–184 (.432) over the past two seasons. Field manager Cal Ripken Sr. is retained.
- October 7 – Doug DeCinces, who famously succeeded Brooks Robinson as the Orioles' regular third baseman in 1976, draws his unconditional release from the St. Louis Cardinals, ending his MLB tenure after 1,649 games played, 237 homers, and one All-Star selection. DeCinces, 37, will play one final season for the Yakult Swallows of Nippon Professional Baseball in 1988.
- October 12
  - The Minnesota Twins win their second American League crown since moving from Washington in 1961, decisively defeating the Detroit Tigers in the 1987 AL Championship Series, four games to one. In Game 5 at Tiger Stadium today, Dan Gladden and Tom Brunansky lead the offense and Bert Blyleven gains his second LCS victory by a 9–5 final. Brunansky bats .412 (seven for 17, plus four bases on balls) with two homers and nine RBI in the five games, but Twins' third baseman Gary Gaetti is elected series MVP.
  - Cincinnati Reds owner Marge Schott fires general manager Bill Bergesch after a disappointing 84–78 season. He'll be replaced by Murray Cook, who stepped down as the Montreal Expos' GM in mid-August. Both Bergesch and Cook are former general managers of George Steinbrenner's New York Yankees.
- October 14
  - At Busch Memorial Stadium, the St. Louis Cardinals win a hotly contested NL Championship Series, defeating the San Francisco Giants in Game 7, 6–0, behind Danny Cox's eight-hit complete game. The Redbirds' 15th National League pennant propels them into the 1987 World Series against the Minnesota Twins. The Giants' Jeffrey Leonard—who slugged an LCS-record four home runs, while infuriating the Cardinals with his "one flap down" home-run trot—is elected series MVP.
  - Dick Wagner quits as president and general manager of the Houston Astros after two full seasons in the job. Bill Wood, 46, Wagner's top assistant, will succeed him as GM.
- October 15 – The autumn free-agent season begins in earnest when over 60 players, many of them veteran "six-year" minor-leaguers with scant MLB experience, are granted freedom to test the market.
- October 19 – On "Black Monday" (a massive stock market crash) and in the midst of a World Series, George Steinbrenner garners headlines when he hires Billy Martin as manager of his New York Yankees for the fifth time since August 1975. Martin's fourth term had ended on October 27, 1985; despite his erratic behavior and stormy relationship with Steinbrenner, he's compiled an overall mark of 516–357 (.591) at the Yankees' helm, including one World Series crown, over the years. He replaces Lou Piniella, manager of the Bombers for the past two seasons, who is promoted to general manager.
- October 25 – In Game 7 of the World Series, starter Frank Viola and reliever Jeff Reardon hold the St. Louis Cardinals to six hits, as the Minnesota Twins win 4–2 for their first Fall Classic championship in their 27-year history in the Twin Cities. The franchise's last title came in 1924 as the Washington Senators. Viola is named the Series MVP.
- October 27 – Buck Rodgers, who led the Montreal Expos to 91 victories in 1987, is elected National League Manager of the Year by the BBWAA, outpacing Roger Craig of the San Francisco Giants by 27 points. Two days from now, Sparky Anderson of the American League East champion Detroit Tigers will win his second Junior Circuit Manager of the Year nod in four seasons, edging Tom Trebelhorn of the Milwaukee Brewers and Tom Kelly of the world-champion Twins by 12 and 16 points, respectively.
- October 28 – Philadelphia Phillies club president and part-owner Bill Giles turns over player personnel responsibilities to Woody Woodward, who quit ten days ago as general manager of the New York Yankees. Giles has been handling GM duties himself for the past three seasons.
- October 30 – Dallas Green, only three years after his recognition as MLB Executive of the Year, resigns as president and general manager of the Chicago Cubs over "philosophical differences" with the team's owners, the Tribune Company. Since taking the job six years ago, Green, 53, took the Cubs from last place to their first postseason appearance in 39 years as 1984 NL East champions. But three straight losing seasons, including a return to the basement in 1987, created friction leading to Green's departure.

=== November ===
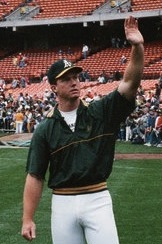
Mark McGwire

- November 2
  - The New York Yankees obtain catcher Don Slaught from the Texas Rangers for pitcher Brad Arnsberg (PTBNL). Slaught, 29, is projected as the Bombers' starting backstop for 1988.
  - The Cleveland Indians appoint Hank Peters club president, filling the vacancy left by Peter Bavasi's resignation earlier this year. Peters, 63, is a two-time former MLB Executive of the Year. Three weeks from today, he will also be named to succeed Cleveland general manager Joe Klein.
- November 3 – Mark McGwire, who set a new MLB rookie record of 49 home runs as a member of the Oakland Athletics, is the unanimous choice (28 first-place votes, 140 points) as 1987's American League Rookie of the Year—the second unanimous choice (after Carlton Fisk in 1972) in the award's 39-year history.
- November 4 – One day after McGwire's triumph, San Diego Padres catcher Benito Santiago becomes the National League's Rookie of the Year by unanimous vote. He's the fourth consensus NL ROTY since 1956, and the first since Vince Coleman (1985).
- November 6 – The Cincinnati Reds trade pitcher Ted Power and shortstop Kurt Stillwell to the Kansas City Royals in exchange for pitcher Danny Jackson and infielder Ángel Salazar. The move allows the Reds to make Barry Larkin their new starting shortstop.
- November 9
  - The third off-season of the "collusion era" today gains momentum. As 76 members of the "Class of 1987" are granted free agency, the headlines belong to two eventual Hall of Famers who choose to sign with their longtime teams and avoid the open market: Mike Schmidt of the Philadelphia Phillies and Cal Ripken Jr. of the Baltimore Orioles. Schmidt, 38, a 3x National League Most Valuable Player, signs a one-year $2.5 million contract (with a club option for 1989) with Philadelphia, and Ripken, 27, who has already won the first of his two career AL MVP Awards, inks a one-year, $1.7 million deal with Baltimore.
  - Another future Hall of Famer, Jack Morris of the Detroit Tigers, is among the 76 who are free to test the market. A year ago, marquee free agent Morris publicly charged owners with conspiring to hold down salaries when he found no clubs (save the Tigers) interested in his services. This year, he will decide to again return to Detroit, signing a two-year contract worth $4 million on December 29.
  - The players' September victory in the "Collusion I" case will stimulate more trades and free-agent signings than the previous two off-seasons. However, for the third year, the owners' behavior will spawn a grievance (to be nicknamed "Collusion III") from the players' union when magnates are charged with creating an "information bank" to share data with each other about contract offers each teams are making to free agents.
- November 10 – In the closest vote in Cy Young Award history, Steve Bedrosian (nine of 24 first-place votes, 57 points) of the Philadelphia Phillies edges Rick Sutcliffe (Chicago Cubs; four first-place votes, 55 points) and Rick Reuschel (San Francisco Giants; eight first-place votes, 54 points) to win National League honors. Bedrosian, who posted a 5–3 (2.83) record with 40 saves, becomes the third relief pitcher ever to win the NL award, joining Mike Marshall (1974) and Bruce Sutter (1979).
- November 11
  - Roger Clemens wins his second consecutive AL Cy Young Award, taking 21 of 28 first-place votes and 124 points to finish comfortably ahead of runner-up Jimmy Key (four first-place votes, 64 points) of the Toronto Blue Jays. Clemens (20–9, 2.97) led or tied for the league lead in wins, bWAR (9.4), wins, complete games (18) and shutouts (seven), and finished second in strikeouts (256).
  - The Chicago Cubs fill a critical front-office vacancy by appointing former field manager Jim Frey vice president, baseball operations and de facto general manager (GM). Frey, 56, led the 1984 Cubs to the NL East title in the team's first postseason appearance in 39 years. As the Cubs' top baseball officer, he succeeds Dallas Green, the man who fired him in June 1986.
    - Nine days from now, on November 20, Frey will hire Don Zimmer as the Cubs' manager for 1988. Zimmer was Frey's high-school teammate in Cincinnati, and was Frey's third-base coach on the 1984 Cubs. The Cubs will be Zimmer's fourth career MLB managerial assignment and first since 1982, when he helmed the Texas Rangers.
  - The Baltimore Orioles also choose a new general manager by naming Roland Hemond, 58, to succeed Hank Peters, fired seven weeks ago. Hemond is known for his 15 years as director of player personnel, then GM, of the Chicago White Sox.
- November 12
  - The White Sox send pitchers Richard Dotson, a former (1983) 22-game winner, and Scott Nielsen to the New York Yankees for left-hander Steve Rosenberg, catcher Mark Salas and outfielder Dan Pasqua.
  - The Houston Astros release second baseman Davey Lopes, 42, signaling the end of Lopes' playing career after 16 seasons, 1,812 games, and four All-Star selections.

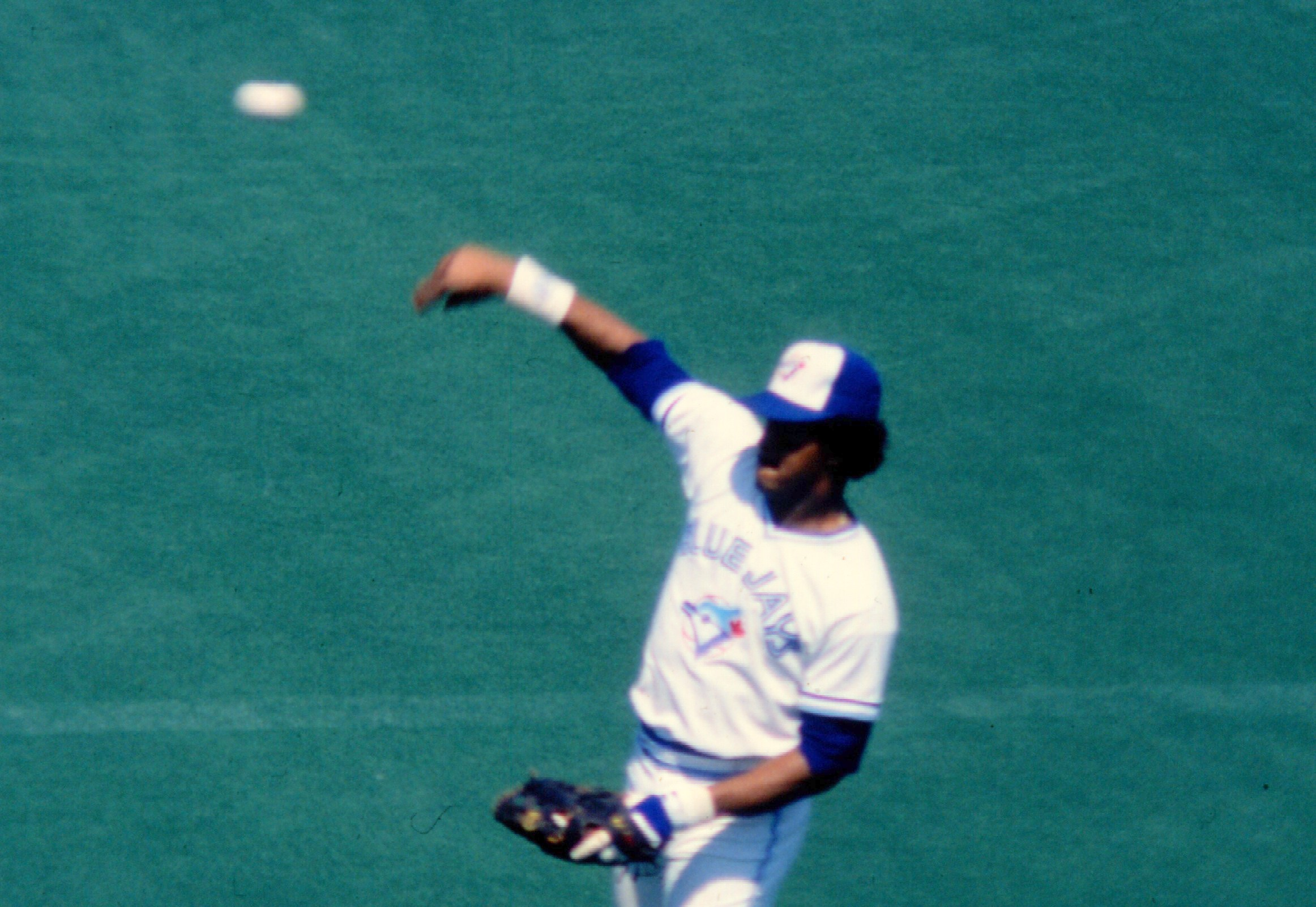
George Bell

- November 17 – Slugging outfielder George Bell (16 first-place votes, 332 points) becomes the first Toronto Blue Jay to win an American League MVP Award when he defeats Alan Trammell (12 first-place votes, 311 points) of the Detroit Tigers in a two-man race. Bell, 28, led the AL in runs batted in with 134 in 1987.
- November 18 – André Dawson of the Chicago Cubs wins the NL MVP Award, the first recipient to play for a last-place team. Dawson (11 of 24 first-place votes, 269 points) bests two members of the NL-pennant-winning St. Louis Cardinals, Ozzie Smith (nine, 193) and Jack Clark (three, 186). Dawson, 33, led the Senior Circuit in homers (49), RBI (137) and total bases (353), and won his seventh Gold Glove Award.

=== December ===
- December 1
  - The California Angels sign two-time National League All-Star outfielder Chili Davis, granted free agency from the San Francisco Giants on November 9.
  - The Giants, in turn, agree to terms with outfielder Brett Butler, granted free agency from the Cleveland Indians, also on November 9. Butler hit .295 with nine home runs, 41 RBI, and 33 stolen bases in 1987.
- December 5 – The Detroit Tigers deal starting pitcher Dan Petry, winner of 37 games for them in 1983–1984, to the Angels for two-time Gold Glove Award-winning centerfielder Gary Pettis.
- December 7 – The Baltimore Orioles select 23-year-old right-hander José Bautista from the New York Mets in the Rule 5 draft.
- December 8
  - The Boston Red Sox acquire future Hall-of-Fame closer Lee Smith from the Chicago Cubs for pitchers Al Nipper and Calvin Schiraldi. Smith, 30, will save 60 games in 2½ seasons with Boston; he's at the midpoint of a career that will see him save 478 games and make seven All-Star teams en route to Cooperstown (2019).
  - "The Cobra", slugging outfielder and 2025 Hall-of-Fame inductee Dave Parker, is traded by the Cincinnati Reds to the Oakland Athletics for pitchers Tim Birtsas and José Rijo.
  - The Atlanta Braves trade former All-Star shortstop Rafael Ramírez to the Houston Astros for third baseman Ed Whited and pitcher Mike Stoker. Ramírez, who appeared in only 56 games for the 1987 Braves, will return to form in 1988, becoming Houston's first-string shortstop for the next three seasons.
  - The New York Mets send relief pitcher Doug Sisk to the Baltimore Orioles for hurlers Blaine Beatty and Greg Talamantz ("PTBNL"). Sisk, 30, was the Mets' top right-handed closer before shoulder and elbow miseries diminished his effectiveness.
- December 9
  - The Seattle Mariners make two deals. In one, they send former All-Star outfielder Phil Bradley and pitcher Tim Fortugno to the Philadelphia Phillies for outfielders Glenn Wilson, also a former All-Star, and Dave Brundage and pitcher Mike Jackson. In the other, they trade starting pitcher Mike Morgan to the Orioles for fellow righty Ken Dixon.
  - The Oakland Athletics sign veteran catcher Ron Hassey, granted free agency from the Chicago White Sox on November 30.
- December 10 – In a six-player, intra-divisional transaction, the White Sox trade 32-year-old southpaw Floyd Bannister, a 16-game winner in 1987, along with utilityman Dave Cochrane, to the Kansas City Royals for pitchers John Davis (24), Greg Hibbard (23), Mélido Pérez (21) and Chuck Mount (22).
- December 11
  - A three-team, eight-player, inter-league blockbuster shakes up the rosters of the Los Angeles Dodgers, New York Mets and Oakland Athletics, who will each earn division championships in 1988. The trade sees Oakland send pitchers Kevin Tapani and Wally Whitehurst to New York, and reliever Jay Howell and shortstop Alfredo Griffin to Los Angeles; the Mets send southpaw Jesse Orosco to the Dodgers; and Los Angeles deals pitchers Bob Welch and Matt Young to the Athletics, and hurler Jack Savage to the Mets. In the coming year, Howell will save 21 games (and win five) and Orosco will be a key situational lefty coming out of the Dodger bullpen, while starting pitcher Welch will claim 17 victories for Oakland—and those teams will meet in the 1988 World Series.
  - The Mets also make an inter-league deal with their Bronx rivals, shipping shortstop Rafael Santana to the Yankees, along with hurler Victor García, for pitcher Steve Frey, catcher/outfielder Phil Lombardi and outfielder Darren Reed.
- December 14
  - The Chicago Cubs sign third baseman Vance Law, granted free agency from the Montreal Expos on November 19. Law will be selected to the 1988 NL All-Star team.
  - The Detroit Tigers re-sign veteran outfielder Larry Herndon after unconditionally releasing him a month ago. Herndon, 34, batted .324 with nine homers in 89 games for the AL East champions in 1987.

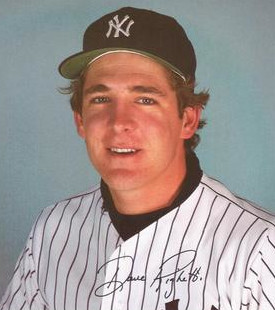
Dave Righetti

- December 15
  - Reggie Jackson, 41, is granted free agency from the Oakland Athletics, effectively ending the future Hall of Famer's MLB career after 21 seasons, 2,820 games, and 563 regular-season home runs—and a reputation for post-season slugging that spawned the nickname "Mr. October."
  - A lesser-known Oakland outfielder, right-fielder Mike Davis, signs with the Los Angeles Dodgers after being granted free agency on November 9. Davis, 28, will struggle through a sub-par 1988 regular season, but in Game 1 of the 1988 World Series, his two-out walk against former teammate Dennis Eckersley will set the table for one of the most dramatic victories in Dodgers' and Fall Classic history.
- December 21
  - Major league clubs decline to offer 1988 contracts to 23 players, making them free agents (and permitting their former team to cut their salaries by 20% should it choose to re-sign them). Among those released: Steve Balboni, Don Baylor, Steve Carlton, Mike Easler, Ron Kittle and Tony Phillips.
  - The Oakland Athletics sign outfielder Dave Henderson, granted free agency from the San Francisco Giants on November 9.
- December 22
  - The New York Yankees send pitcher Steve Trout and outfielder Henry Cotto to the Seattle Mariners for hurlers Lee Guetterman, Clay Parker and Wade Taylor. Avoiding arbitration, the Bombers also sign relief ace Dave Righetti to a three-year, $4.3 million contract.
  - Sixteen-game winner Mike Witt agrees to return to the California Angels; he had been granted free agency on November 9.

== Movies ==
- Long Gone (TV)

== Births ==
=== January ===
- January 2 – Dave Sappelt
- January 7 – Brandon Bantz
- January 7 – Kyle Hudson
- January 10 – Ryan Dennick
- January 10 – Paolo Espino
- January 10 – Alberto Rosario
- January 12 – Iván Nova
- January 13 – Oliver Drake
- January 14 – Logan Forsythe
- January 16 – Zelous Wheeler
- January 17 – Jeff Beliveau
- January 17 – Cody Decker
- January 17 – Tanner Scheppers
- January 19 – James Darnell
- January 20 – Luis Exposito
- January 21 – Brandon Crawford
- January 21 – Chase d'Arnaud
- January 21 – Jake Diekman
- January 21 – Roger Kieschnick
- January 21 – Josh Wall
- January 23 – Cord Phelps
- January 26 – Héctor Noesí
- January 26 – Jemile Weeks
- January 28 – José Ceda
- January 29 – José Abreu
- January 29 – Alex Avila
- January 30 – Luis García
- January 30 – Tyler Moore
- January 31 – Melky Mesa
- January 31 – Caleb Thielbar

=== February ===
- February 1 – Austin Jackson
- February 1 – Joe Mahoney
- February 5 – Mark Hamburger
- February 6 – Pedro Álvarez
- February 6 – Travis Wood
- February 11 – Brian Matusz
- February 12 – David Cooper
- February 12 – Argenis Díaz
- February 13 – Ryan Buchter
- February 13 – Curtis Partch
- February 13 – Ryan Perry
- February 13 – Henry Urrutia
- February 15 – Rob Scahill
- February 16 – Tom Milone
- February 17 – Danny Farquhar
- February 19 – Josh Reddick
- February 22 – Tommy Field
- February 22 – Carlos Peguero
- February 25 – Phil Irwin
- February 25 – Henry Rodríguez
- February 25 – Andrew Werner
- February 28 – Aaron Thompson

=== March ===
- March 4 – Dan Cortes
- March 7 – Joel Carreño
- March 9 – Daniel Hudson
- March 10 – Charles Leesman
- March 14 – Blaine Hardy
- March 21 – Michael Brady
- March 21 – Carlos Carrasco
- March 22 – Ike Davis
- March 24 – Lucas Luetge
- March 24 – Josh Zeid
- March 25 – Hyun-jin Ryu
- March 25 – Kirby Yates
- March 27 – Buster Posey
- March 28 – Bryan Morris
- March 30 – Mike Broadway
- March 30 – Shairon Martis
- March 31 – Peter Bourjos

=== April ===
- April 2 – Brad Glenn
- April 3 – Jay Bruce
- April 3 – Jason Kipnis
- April 4 – Odrisamer Despaigne
- April 4 – Cameron Maybin
- April 5 – Jung-ho Kang
- April 8 – Yonder Alonso
- April 8 – Jeremy Hellickson
- April 9 – Eric Campbell
- April 10 – Ryan Verdugo
- April 16 – Richard Bleier
- April 17 – Dan Jennings
- April 20 – Dusty Coleman
- April 20 – Ian Thomas
- April 21 – Ryan Adams
- April 21 – Brent Morel
- April 22 – Tyson Ross
- April 24 – Welington Castillo
- April 25 – Danny Espinosa

=== May ===
- May 1 – Iván DeJesús Jr.
- May 6 – Gerardo Parra
- May 10 – Brayan Villarreal
- May 11 – Red Patterson
- May 12 – Adam Liberatore
- May 12 – Lance Lynn
- May 13 – D. J. Mitchell
- May 15 – David Adams
- May 15 – Michael Brantley
- May 15 – Brian Dozier
- May 16 – Tyler Cloyd
- May 21 – Allan Dykstra
- May 22 – Jaye Chapman
- May 24 – Blake Tekotte
- May 24 – Henry Villar

=== June ===
- June 5 – Manny Piña
- June 7 – Sean Halton
- June 11 – Ezequiel Carrera
- June 13 – Justin Miller
- June 15 – Jake Elmore
- June 15 – Josh Lindblom
- June 15 – Eduardo Núñez
- June 16 – Arquimedes Caminero
- June 18 – Jeremy Bleich
- June 18 – Jason Castro
- June 18 – J. B. Shuck
- June 18 – Taylor Thompson
- June 19 – Collin McHugh
- June 24 – Juan Francisco
- June 24 – Sam Freeman
- June 29 – Jeremy Moore
- June 30 – Ryan Cook
- June 30 – Cole Figueroa

=== July ===
- July 3 – Casey Coleman
- July 3 – Zach Putnam
- July 7 – Yangervis Solarte
- July 8 – Christian Friedrich
- July 8 – Josh Harrison
- July 8 – Mason Tobin
- July 9 – Rusney Castillo
- July 10 – Jermaine Curtis
- July 10 – Johnny Giavotella
- July 10 – Gregory Infante
- July 11 – Shun Yamaguchi
- July 16 – Eric Surkamp
- July 17 – Leonel Campos
- July 17 – Nick Christiani
- July 18 – Conor Gillaspie
- July 19 – Yan Gomes
- July 21 – Diego Moreno
- July 26 – Alex Burnett
- July 26 – Vidal Nuño
- July 27 – Preston Guilmet
- July 28 – Jae-gyun Hwang

=== August ===
- August 2 – Juan Jaime
- August 4 – Hiram Burgos
- August 4 – Mike Freeman
- August 4 – David Martínez
- August 5 – Tim Federowicz
- August 7 – Ryan Lavarnway
- August 7 – Kirk Nieuwenhuis
- August 7 – Josh Smith
- August 7 – Rafael Ynoa
- August 10 – Wilson Ramos
- August 10 – Matt den Dekker
- August 11 – Drew Storen
- August 13 – Dustin Garneau
- August 13 – J. J. Hoover
- August 14 – Jeremy Hazelbaker
- August 14 – David Peralta
- August 15 – Jorge de León
- August 17 – Thomas Neal
- August 18 – Justin Wilson
- August 21 – J. D. Martinez
- August 23 – Zach Braddock
- August 25 – Logan Morrison
- August 25 – Murphy Smith
- August 25 – Justin Upton
- August 25 – Adam Warren
- August 26 – Ryan Brasier
- August 26 – Greg Halman
- August 27 – Brett Bochy
- August 31 – Stephen Cardullo
- August 31 – Steve Johnson

=== September ===
- September 1 – David Carpenter
- September 1 – Sean O'Sullivan
- September 1 – Trayvon Robinson
- September 3 – Domonic Brown
- September 3 – Drew Hayes
- September 5 – Scott Barnes
- September 7 – Gorkys Hernández
- September 10 – Paul Goldschmidt
- September 11 – Brandon Laird
- September 21 – Jeremy Jeffress
- September 23 – González Germen
- September 23 – Xavier Scruggs
- September 24 – Jake Goebbert
- September 25 – Lars Anderson
- September 25 – Vance Worley
- September 27 – Grant Green
- September 27 – David Hale
- September 28 – Nick Greenwood
- September 28 – Derrick Robinson
- September 28 – Jerry Sands
- September 29 – Alí Solís
- September 30 – Kenley Jansen

=== October ===
- October 1 – Erik Komatsu
- October 2 – Rafael Lopez
- October 5 – Marc Krauss
- October 7 – Alex Cobb
- October 9 – Cory Burns
- October 9 – Yadiel Hernández
- October 10 – Adrian Cardenas
- October 10 – Elvin Ramírez
- October 14 – Kole Calhoun
- October 19 – John Holdzkom
- October 20 – Edwar Cabrera
- October 21 – Justin De Fratus
- October 23 – Félix Doubront
- October 23 – Kyle Gibson
- October 27 – Jay Jackson
- October 27 – Ben Paulsen
- October 28 – Casey Lawrence
- October 30 – Ryan Kelly
- October 31 – Yamaico Navarro

=== November ===
- November 1 – Anthony Bass
- November 1 – Steve Geltz
- November 1 – Donnie Joseph
- November 3 – Kyle Seager
- November 3 – Ryan Tepera
- November 6 – Caleb Cotham
- November 6 – Cory Rasmus
- November 8 – Bryan Shaw
- November 11 – Kyle McPherson
- November 12 – Mike Leake
- November 13 – Tim Adleman
- November 16 – Jordan Walden
- November 19 – Bryan Holaday
- November 20 – Jeff Locke
- November 24 – Kelvin Marte
- November 24 – Chris Herrmann
- November 25 – Grant Dayton
- November 25 – Nate Karns
- November 30 – Chase Anderson

=== December ===
- December 3 – Andrew Oliver
- December 5 – A. J. Pollock
- December 5 – Chris Rearick
- December 8 – Kyle Drabek
- December 8 – Zach McAllister
- December 8 – Alex Torres
- December 9 – Buddy Baumann
- December 9 – Blake Smith
- December 9 – Mat Latos
- December 9 – Pedro Villarreal
- December 9 – Adam Wilk
- December 13 – Aneury Rodríguez
- December 15 – Scott Copeland
- December 16 – Mickey Jannis
- December 16 – Hector Santiago
- December 17 – Donovan Solano
- December 17 – Travis Tartamella
- December 18 – Rex Brothers
- December 18 – Rudy Owens
- December 19 – Aaron Loup
- December 21 – Khris Davis
- December 22 – Zack Britton
- December 22 – Chad Jenkins
- December 23 – Tyler Robertson
- December 23 – Jordany Valdespin
- December 26 – Mike Minor
- December 28 – Shawn O'Malley

== Deaths ==
=== January ===
- January 1
  - Velma Abbott, 57, Canadian infielder who played from 1946 to 1947 in the All-American Girls Professional Baseball League.
  - Norene Arnold, 59, All-American Girls Professional Baseball League pitcher and infielder.
  - Ernie Maun, 85, pitcher who played for the New York Giants in 1924 and the Philadelphia Phillies in 1926.
- January 2
  - Julio Moreno, 65, Cuban fireball pitcher whose professional career spanned over 30 years, including four Major League Baseball seasons with the Washington Senators from 1950 to 1953.
  - Bill Upton, 57, relief pitcher for 1954 Philadelphia Athletics.
- January 4 – Tony Rensa, 85, backup catcher who played for the New York Yankees, Detroit Tigers, Philadelphia Phillies and Chicago White Sox in part of six seasons spanning 1930–1939.
- January 5 – Dale Mitchell, 65, two-time All-Star left fielder who played for the Cleveland Indians and Brooklyn Dodgers in a span of eleven seasons from 1946 through 1956. A career .312 hitter, Mitchell posted a .432 average in his rookie season and hit .300 or better six of the next seven seasons, including a career-high .336 mark in 1948, ending third in the American League batting race behind Ted Williams (.369) and Lou Boudreau (.355), while leading the American League in hits (203), singles (161) and triples (23), helping the Indians win the 1948 World Series, Afterwards, he guided Cleveland to an AL record 111 wins in a 154-game season and the 1954 American League pennant, even though Mitchell is perhaps best remembered, nevertheless unfairly, for making the final out in the perfect game pitched by New York Yankees' Don Larsen in the 1956 World Series against the Dodgers.
- January 6 – Margaret Danhauser, 65, outstanding first sacker for the Racine Belles of the All-American Girls Professional Baseball League from 1943 through 1950.
- January 8
  - Elmer Miller, 83, two-way pitcher for the 1929 Philadelphia Phillies.
  - Phil Seghi, 77, minor league player and manager turned scout and executive; farm and scouting director of the Cincinnati Reds when his club signed Pete Rose in 1960; later, general manager of the Cleveland Indians from 1973 to 1985.
- January 10
  - Frank Hiller, 66, pitcher who played for the New York Yankees, Chicago Cubs, Cincinnati Reds and New York Giants over six seasons between 1946 and 1953.
  - Frank Makosky, 76. pitcher who played in 1937 for the New York Yankees.
- January 13 – Tom Morgan, 56, relief pitcher who played for five different clubs during 12 seasons spanning 1951–1963; member of New York Yankees teams that won World Series titles in 1951, 1952 and 1956; later, a pitching coach for three MLB teams between 1972 and 1983.
- January 17 – Ed Busch, 69, shortstop who played from 1943 to 1945 for the Philadelphia Athletics.
- January 19 – George Selkirk, 79, two-time All-Star Canadian corner outfielder who played from 1934 through 1942 for the New York Yankees, collecting a .290/.400/.483 slash line with 108 home runs and 576 runs batted in during his nine seasons with the team, helping them win six American League pennants and five World Series titles between 1936 and 1942; later, a minor league manager and MLB front office executive, notably serving as general manager of the Washington Senators from 1963 to 1968.
- January 20 – Hank Behrman, 65, pitcher for the Brooklyn Dodgers, Pittsburgh Pirates and New York Giants in a span of four seasons from 1946 to 1949, who also appeared in the 1947 World Series with the National League Champion Dodgers.

=== February ===
- February 2
  - Néstor Lambertus, 80, Dominican-born outfielder who played for the 1929 Cuban Stars East of the American Negro League.
  - Olive Little, 69, Canadian All-Star pitcher who threw four no-hitters in the All-American Girls Professional Baseball League.
- February 5 – Michael Burke, 70, executive; president of the New York Yankees from September 1966 to April 1973, three months after he presided over CBS' sale of the Bombers to George Steinbrenner; briefly a candidate for Commissioner of Baseball in 1969.
- February 8 – Larnie Jordan, 72, shortstop for the Philadelphia Stars and New York Black Yankees of the Negro National League between 1940 and 1942.
- February 9 – Larry French, 79, All-Star left-handed pitcher and knuckleball specialist, who played for the Pittsburgh Pirates, Chicago Cubs and Brooklyn Dodgers over 14 seasons from 1929 to 1941, compiling a 197–171 record with 1,187 strikeouts and a 3.44 ERA in 3,152 innings, including 40 shutouts and 198 complete games.
- February 11 – Bill McGee, 77, pitcher who played from 1935 through 1942 with the St. Louis Cardinals and New York Giants.
- February 13 – Leo Norris, 78, third baseman and second baseman who played in 270 games for the Philadelphia Phillies between 1936 and 1937.
- February 26 – Eddie Jefferson, 64, pitcher for the Philadelphia Stars of the Negro National League in 1945 and 1946.

=== March ===
- March 2 – Mo Mozzali, 64, St. Louis Cardinals' MLB hitting coach in 1977 and 1978; minor-league outfielder and longtime member of St. Louis organization as a scout and instructor.
- March 3 – Danny Kaye, 76, entertainer and a founding co-owner of the Seattle Mariners from 1976 to 1985.
- March 9 – Zeke Bonura, 78, solid defensive first baseman for the Chicago White Sox, Washington Senators, New York Giants and Chicago Cubs in the period between 1934 and 1940, hitting .300 or better in four of his seven seasons with a career-high .345 in 1937, while compiling a .307 batting average with 119 home runs and 704 runs batted in in 917 games.
- March 11
  - Fred Lucas, 84, who hit a .265 average in 20 games for the 1935 Philadelphia Phillies as a reserve outfielder for Ethan Allen, George Watkins and Johnny Moore.
  - Bots Nekola, 80, pitcher for the New York Yankees in 1929 and the Detroit Tigers in 1933, who later became a long time scout for the Boston Red Sox who signed future Hall of Famer Carl Yastrzemski.
- March 13 – Wayne Osborne, 74, pitcher who appeared in seven total games for the 1935 Pittsburgh Pirates and 1936 Boston Bees, as well as 13 years (1931–1943) in the Pacific Coast League; after his pitching career, a broadcaster who was a member of the 1945 Chicago Cubs' radio team.
- March 16 – Bob Kline, 77, well-rounded pitcher that started and filled various relief roles, coming out from the bullpen as a closer, middle reliever and set-up man, while playing for the Boston Red Sox, Philadelphia Athletics and Washington Senators from 1930 to 1934.
- March 19 – Red Jones, 81, American League umpire, 1944 to 1949; later, a color commentator for Cleveland Indians' TV crew.
- March 23 – Tony Pacheco, 59, native of Cuba and longtime minor league infielder and manager who spent six years in the majors as a coach for the Cleveland Indians (1974) and Houston Astros (1976–1979, 1982).
- March 25 – Alvin Gipson, 72, pitcher who posted a 7–26 won–lost mark fort the 1941–1946 Birmingham Black Barons of the Negro American League.
- March 30 – George Blackerby, 83, backup outfielder for the 1928 Chicago White Sox.

=== April ===
- April 6 – Bud Morse, 82, second baseman who played his only major league season with the 1929 World Series Champion Philadelphia Athletics, which is considered one of the greatest baseball teams ever assembled.
- April 12 – Clarence Isreal, 69, third baseman for the Newark Eagles and Homestead Grays of the Negro National League between 1940 and 1947.
- April 19
  - Frank McElyea, 68, left fielder for the 1942 Boston Braves.
  - Roy Partlow, 74, southpaw who led Negro National League hurlers in earned run average twice (1939, 1942), was a 1940 All-Star, and 1943 Negro World Series champion as a member of the Homestead Grays; one of first Black ballplayers to sign with the Brooklyn Dodgers in 1945 after Jackie Robinson, and was briefly Robinson's teammate with 1946 Montreal Royals; returned to Negro leagues later in 1946.
- April 21 – Haruyasu Nakajima, 77, Hall of Fame Japanese outfielder who played with the Yomiuri Giants and the Taiyo Whales from 1936 to 1951.
- April 24 – John Mihalic, 75, second baseman who played for the Washington Senators from 1935 to 1937.
- April 27 – John Burrows, 74, pitcher who played from 1943 to 1944 for the Philadelphia Athletics and Chicago Cubs.
- April 29 – Bud Bates, 75, backup outfielder for the 1939 Philadelphia Phillies.

=== May ===
- May 1 – Bobo Holloman, 62, pitcher for the 1953 St. Louis Browns, who made history as the only pitcher in the modern era to throw a no-hitter in his first start.
- May 7 – Boom-Boom Beck, 82, pitcher who posted a 38–65 record for seven different teams between 1924 and 1945.
- May 14 – Luke Sewell, 86, All-Star catcher who played for four American League teams in a span of 20 seasons from 1921 to 1942; managed the St. Louis Browns from June 5, 1941, to August 28, 1946, leading the team to their only AL pennant in 1944; later managed the Cincinnati Reds from September 30, 1949, to July 29, 1952; brother Joe was a Hall of Fame second baseman/shortstop.
- May 16 – Willie Powell, 83, left-hander who pitched in the Negro National League between 1925 and 1934, mainly for the Chicago American Giants and Detroit Stars; two-time Negro World Series champion; led NNL in ERA (1928) and games lost (1931).
- May 31
  - Jerry Adair, 50, trustworthy middle infielder and third baseman for four American League teams during 13 seasons from 1958 to 1970, mainly with the Baltimore Orioles, who set then-major league records for single-season fielding average (.994) and fewest errors (5) in 1964.
  - Jack Sheehan, 94, middle infielder and third baseman for the Brooklyn Robins from 1920 to 1921; managed in the minors between 1916 and 1953; also a scout and executive, working as farm director of the Chicago Cubs in the late 1940s and early 1950s, and scouting director for the expansion Washington Senators of the 1960s.

=== June ===
- June 6 – Barney Koch, 64, second baseman for the 1944 Brooklyn Dodgers.
- June 7 – Shosei Go, 70, Hall of Fame pitcher and outfielder that played in the Japanese Baseball League and NPB with the Tokyo Kyojin, the Hanshin/Osaka Tigers and the Mainichi Orions from 1937 to 1957.
- June 13 – Huck Betts, 90, reliable starting and relief pitcher who played for the Philadelphia Phillies and Boston Braves in a span of ten seasons from 1920 to 1935, posting a 61–68 record and 3.93 ERA in 307 appearances, including 53 complete games, eight shutouts, 128 games finished and 16 saves.
- June 15
  - George Smith, 49, Negro leagues second baseman who played for the Indianapolis Clowns and the Chicago American Giants between 1952 and 1957, before joining the Detroit Tigers from 1963 through 1965 and the Boston Red Sox in 1966.
  - Don White, 68, outfielder who played for the Philadelphia Athletics in the 1948 and 1949 seasons.
- June 17 – Dick Howser, 51, All-Star shortstop, World Series-winning manager, and coach; played eight seasons for three American League clubs, including standout debut campaign (second in 1961 Rookie of the Year balloting); third-base coach of New York Yankees from 1969 to 1978 (earning two World Series rings), and manager of 1980 Yankees, guiding them to AL East title but resigning after 1980 ALCS in support of his embattled coach, Mike Ferraro; also head baseball coach at his alma mater, Florida State University (1979); best known for managing the Kansas City Royals, taking over in mid-1981 and leading Royals to their first World Series championship in 1985; forced to sidelines after managing the AL to a victory in the 1986 MLB All-Star game, when he was diagnosed with a malignant brain tumor that claimed his life 11 months later.
- June 18 – Schoolboy Johnny Taylor, 71, All-Star pitcher who hurled for three Negro National League clubs between 1935 and 1944.
- June 21 – Phil Weintraub, 79, fourth outfielder and first baseman who posted a .295 batting average and slugged .440 for four National League teams in seven seasons spanning 1933 to 1945, being also one of only three batters to collect 11 runs batted in in a single game while playing for the 1944 New York Giants.
- June 24 – Fred Newman, 45, pitcher who played for the Los Angeles/California Angels over six seasons from 1962 to 1967.
- June 26 – Jay Avrea, 67, pitcher for the 1950 Cincinnati Reds.
- June 28 – Bill Schuster, 74, shortstop who played with the Pittsburgh Pirates, Boston Bees and Chicago Cubs over five seasons spanning 1937–1945, as well as a member of the Cubs team that won the National League pennant in 1945, scoring the winning run in the team's last victory in a World Series game before the 2016 series.

=== July ===
- July 11 – Joe Bennett, 87, third baseman for the 1923 Philadelphia Phillies.
- July 12 – Joseph Burns, 98, outfielder who played with the Cincinnati Reds in 1910 and for the Detroit Tigers in 1913.
- July 15
  - Lee Ballanfant, 91, "baseball lifer" as a minor-league player and manager, National League umpire from 1936 to 1957 (working in four World Series and four All-Star games), then a scout until retiring at age 86 in 1981; spent 67 years in Organized Baseball.
  - Bill Ricks, 67, standout pitcher for 1944–1948 Philadelphia Stars of the Negro National League; as a rookie, led his league in victories, games and innings pitched, and strikeouts; four years later, led NNL in earned run average; 1942 All-Star.
- July 16 – Rube Novotney, 62, catcher who played in 1949 for the Chicago Cubs.
- July 19 – Bob Smith, 92, who started his career at shortstop but was turned into a pitcher, becoming one of the workhorses of the Boston Braves/Bees pitching staff (1925–1930, 1933–1937), throwing and losing a 22-inning complete game in 1927 (the third-longest marathon feat in major league history), pitching 200 or more innings six times and saving 41 games, while compiling 106 wins and 3.94 ERA in 435 games over 2.246 innings in a span of 13 seasons from 1925 to 1937, including stints with the Chicago Cubs and Cincinnati Reds between 1931 and 1933.
- July 20 – Tom Winsett, 77, left fielder who played for the Boston Red Sox, St. Louis Cardinals and Brooklyn Dodgers in part of seven seasons spanning 1930–1938.
- July 21 – Hughie Wise, 81, catcher who played two games for 1930 Detroit Tigers; later, minor-league manager and longtime MLB scout; father of Casey Wise.
- July 22 – Don McMahon, 57, All-Star relief pitcher who played for seven teams over 18 seasons spanning 1957–1974, leading the National League with 15 saves in 1959, while winning two World Series rings with the 1957 Milwaukee Braves and the 1968 Detroit Tigers; also a pitching coach for three MLB clubs for a dozen years between 1972 and 1985.
- July 27 – Travis Jackson, 83, Hall of Fame and slick fielding shortstop for the New York Giants from 1922 through 1936, who batted over .300 six times, compiling a .291 lifetime average and driving in 90 or more runs three times, reaching 101 in 1934, while leading the National League shortstops in assists four times, in fielding chances three years, and in fielding average and double plays twice, helping the Giants win three NL pennants and the World Series Championship in 1933.

=== August ===
- August 5 – Jocko Conlon, 89, middle infielder and third baseman who played for the Boston Braves in its 1923 season.
- August 8 – Juan Antonio Yanes, 85, who for more than three decades was one of the leading promoters of Venezuelan baseball both in the amateur and professional fields.
- August 11 – John McGillen, 70, pitcher who made two appearances for the Philadelphia Athletics during the 1944 season.
- August 21 – Frank Callaway, 89, middle infielder and third baseman who played from 1921 to 1922 for the Philadelphia Athletics.
- August 31 – Dick Young, 69, longtime New York-based and nationally syndicated sportswriter known for his hard-hitting style.

=== September ===
- September 1 – Pinky Whitney, 82, All-Star and top defensive third baseman for the Philadelphia Phillies and Boston Braves through 12 seasons from 1928 to 1939, who batted .300 or better four times, collecting four 100-RBI seasons and 200 hits twice and batting a career-high .342 with 117 RBI in 1930, while leading all National League third basemen in assists and double plays in four seasons, and in putouts and fielding average three times.
- September 2 – Cam Carreon, 50, catcher for the Chicago White Sox, Cleveland Indians and Baltimore Orioles over all or part of eight seasons from 1959 to 1966.
- September 13 – Charlie Parks, 70, catcher in the Negro National League between 1938 and 1947 who mainly played for the Newark Eagles; member of 1946 Negro World Series champion club.
- September 16 – Kermit Wahl, 64, third baseman and middle infielder who played for the Cincinnati Reds, Philadelphia Athletics and St. Louis Browns in all or part of five seasons spanning 1944–1951.
- September 21 – Jimmy Johnson, 68, southpaw who pitched for the Negro leagues' Toledo–Indianapolis Crawfords in 1939 and 1940.

=== October ===
- October 12 – Snake Henry, 92, first baseman for the Boston Braves from 1922 to 1923, whose greatest achievements were in Minor League Baseball, where he posted a .302 lifetime batting average in 24 seasons, collecting more than 3,200 hits and two MVP Awards, serving also as a manager for the Kinston Eagles in 1939.
- October 17 – Pete Cote, 85, utility man for the 1926 New York Giants.
- October 24 – Ray Sheppard, 84, infielder (primarily a third baseman and shortstop) who played for six Negro leagues teams between 1924 and 1932.
- October 28 – Pete McClanahan, 81, who was used as a pinch-hitter by the Pittsburgh Pirates in its 1931 season.

=== November ===
- November 9 – Ed Cihocki, 80, middle infielder and third baseman for the Philadelphia Athletics over part of two seasons from 1932 to 1933.
- November 10 – Bubby Sadler, 78, shortstop who played in Negro leagues and with Black barnstorming teams between 1934 and 1944; inducted in 1999 to Delaware Sports Museum and Hall of Fame.
- November 14 – Hod Lisenbee, 89, pitcher who played for the Washington Senators, Boston Red Sox, Philadelphia Athletics and Cincinnati Reds in a span of eight seasons from 1927 to 1935, whose notable accomplishment came in his rookie season, when he faced the New York Yankees six times and won the first five outings against the storied 1927 Murderers' Row, allowing three hits without a walk and striking out Babe Ruth and Tony Lazzeri in three innings of relief in his debut against them at Yankee Stadium, while posting an 18–9 record for the third place Senators and leading the American League pitchers with four shutouts.
- November 16 – Jim Brewer, 50, All-Star relief pitcher who played for three clubs in a 17-year career from 1960 to 1976, posting a 69–65 record with a 3.07 ERA and 132 saves, while helping the Los Angeles Dodgers win three National League pennants and the 1965 World Series title.
- November 17 – Paul Derringer, 81, six-time All-Star pitcher who played 15 seasons from 1931 through 1945 for the St. Louis Cardinals, Cincinnati Reds and Chicago Cubs, and he made an impressive debut with the Cardinals, winning 18 games for the eventual 1931 World Series champions and leading the NL in win–loss record (.692), including a streak of 33 consecutive scoreless innings in September, later winning 20 games for Cincinnati four times between 1935 and 1940, along with a 25–7 season in 1939, as the Reds won the NL pennant for the first time in 20 years, as well as pitching complete game wins in Games 4 and 7 of the 1940 World Series, guiding Cincinnati to its first Series title in 21 years.
- November 18 – Dick Stello, 53, National League umpire who worked 2,764 league games between September 20, 1968, and his death; officiated in two World Series, two All-Star games, and five NLCS matchups.
- November 19 – Dave Odom, 69, pitcher who played for the Boston Braves in its 1943 season.
- November 21 – Dusty Cooke, 80, fourth outfielder for the New York Yankees, Boston Red Sox and Cincinnati Reds over eight seasons spanning 1930–1938; played multiple post-World War II roles for the Philadelphia Phillies including athletic trainer (1946–1947), coach (1948–1952), and interim manager (July 16 to 25, 1948).
- November 24 – Jim Russell, 69, outfielder who played from 1942 through 1951 for the Pittsburgh Pirates (1942–1947), Boston Braves (1948–1949) and Brooklyn Dodgers (1950–1951).
- November 27 – Babe Herman, 84, right fielder whose career spanned five different franchises in all or part of 13 seasons between 1926 and 1945, including stints with the Brooklyn Robins (1926–1931) and Dodgers (1945), who was a career .324 hitter and runner-up for the National League batting crown in 1929 with a .381 average, behind Philadelphia Phillies' Lefty O'Doul (.398), and in 1930 with a .393 mark, surpassed by New Tork Giants' Bill Terry (.401) and also the best in Dodgers history, being one of four big leaguers to hit for the cycle three times (twice in 1931), while setting other Dodgers records in a single season that lasted more than twenty years, including more home runs (35) and most total bases (416), although his career was overshadowed by a litany of injuries and for his baserunning and fielding lapses.
- November 29 – Spencer Alexander, 71, outfielder for the 1940–1941 Newark Eagles of the Negro National League.

=== December ===
- December 4 – Carlos Colás, 70, Cuban catcher whose career included stints with the Negro leagues' New York Cubans and Memphis Red Sox, and service in the Mexican League; brother of José Colás.
- December 6 – Jim Johnson, 42, pitcher for the 1970 San Francisco Giants.
- December 7 – Ken Richardson, 72, infield and outfield utility man who played with the Philadelphia Athletics in 1942 and for the Philadelphia Phillies in 1946.
- December 10
  - Whitey Moore, 75, pitcher for the Cincinnati Reds and St. Louis Cardinals in a span of six seasons from 1936 to 1942, including the Reds team that won the 1940 World Series championship.
  - Ollie West, 73, pitcher/outfielder whose 1942–1945 career was largely spent with the Chicago American Giants of the Negro American League.
- December 20 – Jake Eisenhart, 65, southpaw who played in one game at age 21 for the Cincinnati Reds on June 10, 1944; in the ninth inning, he relieved 15-year-old fellow lefty Joe Nuxhall, the youngest player ever to play in the majors, and secured the final out in an 18–0 Cincinnati defeat at the hands of the St. Louis Cardinals.
- December 21 – Joe Sherman, 97, pitcher for the 1915 Philadelphia Athletics.
- December 22 – Bobby Hogue, 66, pitcher who appeared in 172 Major League games over five seasons from 1948 to 1952 for the Boston Braves, St. Louis Browns and New York Yankees, also a member of the 1951 World Series champion Yankees.
- December 24 – Nino Espinosa, 34, pitcher for the New York Mets, Philadelphia Phillies and Toronto Blue Jays during eight seasons from 1974 to 1981.
- December 27 – Lefty Holmes, 80, pitcher whose Negro leagues career spanned 1929 to 1940, and included service on six different teams; brother of Philly Holmes.
