= 1987 Senior League World Series =

American youth baseball tournament

Tournament information
- Location: Kissimmee, Florida
- Dates: August 17–22, 1987

Final positions
- Champions: Athens, Ohio
- Runner-up: Tampa, Florida

The 1987 Senior League World Series took place from August 17–22 in Kissimmee, Florida, United States. Athens, Ohio defeated Tampa, Florida twice in the championship game.

== Teams ==
United States	International
(Rhode Island) East Greenwich, Rhode Island East	(Quebec) Salaberry-de-Valleyfield, Quebec Canada
(Ohio) Athens, Ohio North	(Belgium) Brussels, Belgium Europe
(Florida) Tampa, Florida South	(Taiwan) Taipei, Taiwan Far East
(Hawaii) Moloka'i, Hawaii West	(United States Virgin Islands) Saint Croix, U.S. Virgin Islands Latin America

== Results ==
Upper round 1	Upper round 2	Upper final	World Championship
—	Florida	15
—	Canada	4
1–0	Florida	9
1–0	(United States Virgin Islands) U.S. Virgin Islands	8
—	(United States Virgin Islands) U.S. Virgin Islands	3
—	Taiwan	2
2–0	Florida	4
2–0	Ohio	3
—	Rhode Island	3
—	Hawaii	13
1–0	Hawaii	3
1–0	Ohio	19
—	Belgium	2
—	Ohio	5	3–0	Florida	2	4
3–1	Ohio	3	12
Lower round 1	Lower round 2	Lower round 3	Lower final
1–1	Hawaii	5
0–1	Canada	8	1–1	Canada	1	2–1	Ohio	7
0–1	Rhode Island	6	2–1	Hawaii	9	3–1	Hawaii	5
2–1	(United States Virgin Islands) U.S. Virgin Islands	3
1–1	(United States Virgin Islands) U.S. Virgin Islands (F/8)	5
0–1	Taiwan	6	1–1	Taiwan	4
0–1	Belgium	2

1987 Senior League World Series Champions
Athens, Ohio
