= 1987 Junior League World Series =

Tournament information
- Location: Taylor, Michigan
- Dates: August 17–22

Final positions
- Champions: Rowland Heights, California
- Runner-up: (New York (state)) Wappinger, New York

The 1987 Junior League World Series took place from August 17–22 in Taylor, Michigan, United States. Rowland Heights, California defeated Wappinger, New York twice in the championship game.

== Teams ==
United States	International
(Michigan) Taylor, Michigan Host	(Sonora) Hermosillo, Sonora Mexico
(Wisconsin) Madison, Wisconsin; West Madison; Central	Arroyo, Puerto Rico Puerto Rico
(New York (state)) Wappinger, New York East	
(Tennessee) Bristol, Tennessee South
(California) Rowland Heights, California West

== Results ==
Upper round 1	Upper round 2	Upper final	World Championship
—	Michigan	3
—	Wisconsin	11
1–0	Wisconsin	3
1–0	California	6
—	Mexico	0
—	California	3
2–0	California	2
1–0	(New York (state)) New York	3
—	Tennessee	2
—	Puerto Rico (F/9)	4
1–0	Puerto Rico	2
—	(New York (state)) New York	6
2–0	(New York (state)) New York	4	3
3–1	California	16	14
Lower round 1	Lower round 2	Lower round 3	Lower final
1–1	Puerto Rico	3
0–1	Michigan	0	1–1	Mexico	8	2–1	California	10
0–1	Mexico	6	2–1	Mexico	4	3–1	Mexico	2
2–1	Wisconsin	3
1–1	Wisconsin	10
0–1	Tennessee	7

Consolation Game
0–2	Michigan	6
0–2	Tennessee	9

1987 Junior League World Series Champions
Rowland Heights, California
