= Carlos Colás =

Cuban baseball player (born 1917)

- Catcher / Left fielder
- Born: December 4, 1917; Caimito del Guayabal, Cuba
- Died: December 4, 1987 (aged 70); Havana, Cuba
- Batted: Right Threw: Right

Negro league baseball debut
- 1940, for the New York Cubans

Last appearance
- 1952, for the Memphis Red Sox
- Stats at Baseball Reference

Teams
- New York Cubans (1940–1941); Memphis Red Sox (1949–1952)

Carlos Celestino Colás (December 4, 1917 – December 4, 1987) was a Cuban professional baseball catcher and left fielder who played in the American Negro leagues in the 1940s and 1950s.

A native of Caimito del Guayabal, Cuba, Colás was the brother of fellow Negro leaguer José Colás. Older brother Carlos made his Negro leagues debut in 1940 with the New York Cubans, and played with New York again the following season. He then spent several years in the Mexican League, returning to the Negro leagues in 1949 to spend four seasons with the Memphis Red Sox before playing again in the Mexican League through the mid-1950s. He also played with Indios del Bóer of the Nicaraguan league in 1956.

Colás died in Havana, Cuba in 1987 on his 70th birthday.
