= Ollie West =

American baseball player

- Pitcher
- Born: December 28, 1913; Silsbee, Texas, U.S.
- Died: December 10, 1987 (aged 73); Denver, Colorado, U.S.
- Batted: Left Threw: Right

Negro league baseball debut
- 1942, for the Chicago American Giants

Last appearance
- 1945, for the Chicago American Giants

Teams
- Chicago American Giants (1942–1945); Homestead Grays (1943)

Ollie Ernest West (December 28, 1913 – December 10, 1987), nicknamed "Bill", was an American Negro league pitcher in the 1940s.

A native of Silsbee, Texas, West made his Negro leagues debut in 1942 for the Chicago American Giants. He played with Chicago through 1945, and also briefly pitched for the Homestead Grays during their 1943 Negro World Series championship season. West died in Denver, Colorado in 1987 at age 73.
