= Néstor Lambertus =

Dominican baseball player (born 1927)

- Outfielder / First baseman / Third baseman
- Born: August 12, 1906; Azua, Dominican Republic
- Died: February 2, 1987 (aged 80); New York, New York, U.S.
- Threw: Right

Negro league baseball debut
- 1929, for the Cuban Stars (East)

Last appearance
- 1929, for the Cuban Stars (East)

ANL statistics
- Batting average: .306
- Home runs: 0
- Runs batted in: 6

Teams
- Cuban Stars (East) (1929)

Néstor Lambertus (August 12, 1906 – February 2, 1987) was a Dominican professional baseball outfielder, first baseman and third baseman in the Negro leagues in the 1920s.

A native of Azua, Dominican Republic, Lambertus played for the Cuban Stars (East) in 1929. In his 23 recorded games, he posted 22 hits in 83 plate appearances. Lambertus died in New York, New York in 1987 at age 80.
