= José Colás =

Cuban baseball player (born 1924)

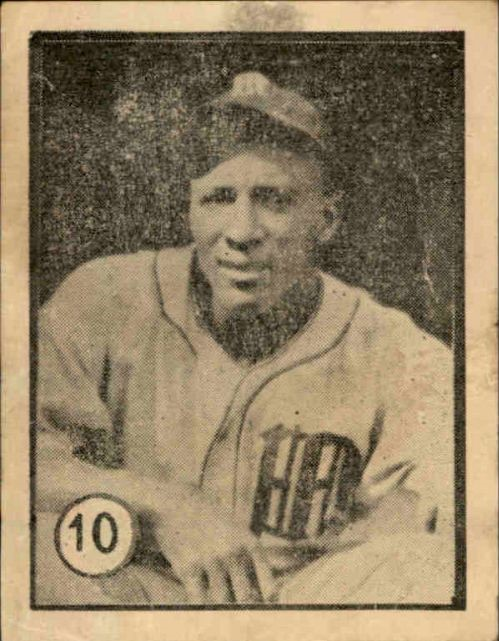
- Center fielder / Shortstop / Third baseman
- Born: 1924 (age 101–102); Havana, Cuba
- Batted: Right Threw: Right

Negro league baseball debut
- 1947, for the Memphis Red Sox

Last appearance
- 1951, for the Memphis Red Sox
- Stats at Baseball Reference

Teams
- Memphis Red Sox (1947–1951)

José Luis Susé Cuesta (born 1924), known as "José Colás", is a Cuban former professional baseball center fielder, shortstop and third baseman who played in the Negro Leagues in the 1940s.

A native of Havana, Cuba, Colás is the younger brother of fellow-Negro leaguer Carlos Colás. He played in the Mexican League prior to making his Negro leagues debut with the Memphis Red Sox in 1947. Colás continued to play for Memphis through 1951, and was selected to the East–West All-Star Game in 1947, 1948 and 1951. He went on to play minor league baseball in the 1950s with such clubs as the Scranton Miners and the Mount Vernon Kings.
