= Charlie Parks (baseball) =

American baseball player (1917-1987)

- Catcher
- Born: June 19, 1917; Chester, South Carolina, U.S.
- Died: September 13, 1987 (aged 70); Salisbury, North Carolina, U.S.
- Batted: Right Threw: Right

Negro league baseball debut
- 1938, for the New York Black Yankees

Last appearance
- 1947, for the Newark Eagles

Teams
- New York Black Yankees (1938–1939); Baltimore Elite Giants (1940); Newark Eagles (1941–1942, 1944, 1946–1947)

Charles Ederson Parks (June 19, 1917 – September 13, 1987) was an American Negro league baseball catcher in the 1930s and 1940s.

A native of Chester, South Carolina, Parks made his Negro leagues debut for the New York Black Yankees in 1938. He played with the Newark Eagles for several seasons, beginning in 1941. Parks served in the United States Army in World War II, and upon returning from service, rejoined Newark and played for the team during its 1946 Negro World Series championship season. He died in Salisbury, North Carolina in 1987 at age 70.
