= Larnie Jordan =

American baseball player

- Shortstop
- Born: April 23, 1914; Valdosta, Georgia, U.S.
- Died: February 8, 1987 (aged 72); Philadelphia, Pennsylvania, U.S.
- Batted: Right Threw: Right

Negro league baseball debut
- 1936, for the Philadelphia Bacharach Giants

Last appearance
- 1942, for the New York Black Yankees
- Stats at Baseball Reference

Teams
- Philadelphia Bacharach Giants (1936); Philadelphia Stars (1940–1941); New York Black Yankees (1942)

Larnie Lee Jordan (April 23, 1914 – February 8, 1987), nicknamed "Boo", was an American Negro league shortstop between 1936 and 1942.

A native of Valdosta, Georgia, Jordan made his Negro leagues debut in 1936 with the Philadelphia Bacharach Giants. He played for the Philadelphia Stars in 1940 and 1941, and finished his career with the New York Black Yankees in 1942. Jordan died in Philadelphia, Pennsylvania in 1987 at age 72.
