= Eddie Jefferson (baseball) =

American baseball player

- Pitcher
- Born: November 27, 1922; Selma, Alabama, U.S.
- Died: February 26, 1987 (aged 64); Oxon Hill, Maryland, U.S.
- Threw: Right

Negro league baseball debut
- 1945, for the Philadelphia Stars

Last appearance
- 1946, for the Philadelphia Stars
- Stats at Baseball Reference

Teams
- Philadelphia Stars (1945–1946)

Edward Lawrence Jefferson (November 27, 1922 – February 26, 1987) was an American Negro league pitcher in the 1940s.

A native of Selma, Alabama, Jefferson played for the Philadelphia Stars in 1945 and 1946. In 14 recorded appearances on the mound, he posted a 2–1 record with a 5.53 ERA in 53.2 innings. Jefferson died in Oxon Hill, Maryland in 1987 at age 64.
