= 1986 Philadelphia Phillies season =

Major League Baseball season

1986 Philadelphia Phillies
- League: National League
- Division: East
- Ballpark: Veterans Stadium
- City: Philadelphia
- Owners: Bill Giles
- General managers: Bill Giles
- Managers: John Felske
- Television: WTAF; PRISM
- Radio: WCAU (Harry Kalas, Richie Ashburn, Andy Musser, Chris Wheeler)

The 1986 Philadelphia Phillies season was the 104th season for the Phillies. Under second-year manager John Felske, the Phillies stayed just below the .500 mark for roughly two-thirds of the season, until a charge after the All-Star break pushed the club past the St. Louis Cardinals and Montreal Expos into second place in the National League East.

== Background ==
The eventual World Series champions rival New York Mets finished with a Major League best 108–54 record, and finished 21 1/2 games ahead of the Phillies. The Mets and the Phillies were the only teams in the National League East to post winning records. Mike Schmidt became the first third baseman in the history of the National League to win the MVP Award three times.

== Offseason ==
- December 6, 1985: Jerry Koosman was released by the Phillies.
- December 22, 1985: Tim Corcoran was released by the Phillies.
- January 16, 1986: Ronn Reynolds was traded by the New York Mets with Jeff Bittiger to the Philadelphia Phillies for Rodger Cole and Ronnie Gideon.
- March 17, 1986: Alan Knicely was released by the Phillies.

== Regular season ==
Veterans Stadium on Phillies Opening Night, April 11, 1986.

On August 20, 1986, pitcher Don Carman took a perfect game into the ninth inning against the San Francisco Giants at Candlestick Park. Giants catcher Bob Brenly hit a long drive into the gap in left-center field. Phillies center fielder Milt Thompson was positioned to make a running catch but the ball hit the base of his glove and was ruled a hit. Carman pitched nine innings, gave up one hit, and was the winner when the Phillies scored in the top of the tenth on a Juan Samuel solo homer to win the game 1 to 0.

The Phillies were the only team in the National League to post a winning record against the World Series champs, going 10–8 with a 7–2 mark at Veterans Stadium. The high point of the season for the Phillies was the three-game sweep of the Mets in mid-September.

On September 12, up by twenty-two games, the Mets needed to win one game to clinch the division and came to Philadelphia for a weekend series. The Phillies won all three games, finishing the weekend by beating the Mets 6–0 behind a six-hit shutout by Kevin Gross, who also tripled home two runs. The sweep still left the Phillies down nineteen games but was both especially satisfying given the significant number of Mets fans who had traveled to Veterans Stadium for the weekend hoping to see the Mets clinch, and necessary because they were swept in a three-game series in Chicago preceding this series and did not want to see a visiting team's division-title celebration at Veterans Stadium. Had the Mets won one of the three games, it would have been the first time that a division title was won at Veterans Stadium.

During the series, Mets fans at Veterans Stadium became unruly and damaged seats in the upper deck. One Mets fan was arrested after striking at two Philadelphia police officers.

The club scored a season-high nineteen runs in a 19–1 throttling of the Chicago Cubs at the Vet on June 23.

Hall-of-Fame third baseman Mike Schmidt won the NL MVP for the third and final time in his career with a league-high thirty-seven home runs with 119 RBI and a .290 average. The Phillies distant second-place finish made Schmidt the first major-league MVP to have played on a team that finished at least twenty games out of first place.

=== Season standings ===
NL East
Team	W	L	Pct.	GB	Home	Road
New York Mets	108	54	.667	—	55‍–‍26	53‍–‍28
Philadelphia Phillies	86	75	.534	21½	49‍–‍31	37‍–‍44
St. Louis Cardinals	79	82	.491	28½	42‍–‍39	37‍–‍43
Montreal Expos	78	83	.484	29½	36‍–‍44	42‍–‍39
Chicago Cubs	70	90	.438	37	42‍–‍38	28‍–‍52
Pittsburgh Pirates	64	98	.395	44	31‍–‍50	33‍–‍48

=== Record vs. opponents ===
1986 National League record Sources:
Team	ATL	CHC	CIN	HOU	LAD	MON	NYM	PHI	PIT	SD	SF	STL
Atlanta	—	9–3	6–12	5–13	10–8	4–7	4–8	4–8	5–7	12–6	7–11	6–6
Chicago	3–9	—	5–7	4–8	6–6	8–10	6–12	9–8	7–11	6–6	6–6	10–7
Cincinnati	12–6	7–5	—	4–14	10–8	7–5	4–8	7–5	10–2	9–9	9–9	7–5
Houston	13–5	8–4	14–4	—	10–8	8–4	5–7	6–6	6–6	10–8	9–9	7–5
Los Angeles	8–10	6–6	8–10	8–10	—	5–7	3–9	5–7	8–4	6–12	8–10	8–4
Montreal	7–4	10–8	5–7	4–8	5–7	—	8–10	8–10	11–7	4–8	5–7	9–9
New York	8–4	12–6	8–4	7–5	9–3	10–8	—	8–10	17–1	10–2	7–5	12–6
Philadelphia	8-4	8–9	5–7	6–6	7–5	10–8	10–8	—	11–7	6–6	9–3	6–12
Pittsburgh	7–5	11–7	2–10	6–6	4–8	7–11	1–17	7–11	—	8–4	4–8	7–11
San Diego	6–12	6–6	9–9	8–10	12–6	8–4	2–10	6–6	4–8	—	8–10	5–7
San Francisco	11–7	6–6	9–9	9–9	10–8	7–5	5–7	3–9	8–4	10–8	—	5–7
St. Louis	6–6	7–10	5–7	5–7	4–8	9–9	6–12	12–6	11–7	7–5	7–5	—

=== Notable transactions ===
- April 19, 1986: Tom Gorman was signed as a free agent by the Phillies.
- May 9, 1986: Dave Stewart was released by the Phillies.
- June 2, 1986: Chuck Knoblauch was drafted by the Phillies in the 18th round of the 1986 Major League Baseball draft, but did not sign.
- June 24, 1986: Steve Carlton was released by the Phillies.
- July 24, 1986: Tom Foley and Lary Sorensen were traded by the Phillies to the Montreal Expos for Dan Schatzeder and Skeeter Barnes.

=== 1986 Game Log ===
Legend
	Phillies win
	Phillies loss
	Postponement
	Eliminated
**Bold**	Phillies team member

1986 Game Log
Overall Record: 86–75
April (8–9)

#	Date	Opponent	Score	Win	Loss	Save	Attendance	Record
1	April 7	@ Reds	4–7	Mario Soto (1–0)	**Steve Carlton** (0–1)	Ron Robinson (1)	54,960	0–1
2	April 9	@ Reds	5–3 (11)	**Steve Bedrosian** (1–0)	Ted Power (0–1)	None	11,411	1–1
3	April 11	Mets	7–9	Bob Ojeda (1–0)	**Kevin Gross** (0–1)	Jesse Orosco (1)	36,190	1–2
4	April 12	Mets	9–8 (14)	**Charles Hudson** (1–0)	Randy Niemann (0–1)	None	22,737	2–2
5	April 13	Mets	4–2	**Shane Rawley** (1–0)	Rick Aguilera (0–1)	None	27,691	3–2
6	April 14	Pirates	1–3 (10)	Cecilio Guante (1–0)	**Steve Bedrosian** (1–1)	Jim Winn (1)	16,200	3–3
–	April 15	Pirates	Postponed (rain); Makeup: August 15 as a traditional double-header					
–	April 16	Pirates	Postponed (rain); Makeup: August 16 as a traditional double-header					
7	April 18	@ Mets	2–5	Ron Darling (1–0)	**Steve Carlton** (0–2)	Jesse Orosco (2)	26,906	3–4
8	April 19	@ Mets	2–3	Dwight Gooden (2–0)	**Shane Rawley** (1–1)	None	38,333	3–5
9	April 20	@ Mets	0–8	Sid Fernandez (1–0)	**Kevin Gross** (0–2)	None	41,848	3–6
10	April 22	@ Expos	2–8	Andy McGaffigan (1–0)	**Charles Hudson** (1–1)	Tim Burke (2)	4,276	3–7
11	April 23	@ Expos	5–4	**Steve Carlton** (1–2)	Joe Hesketh (0–3)	**Steve Bedrosian** (1)	6,293	4–7
12	April 24	@ Pirates	4–2	**Shane Rawley** (2–1)	Rick Rhoden (2–1)	None	14,622	5–7
13	April 25	@ Pirates	6–3	**Kevin Gross** (1–2)	Rick Reuschel (2–2)	**Steve Bedrosian** (2)	11,847	6–7
14	April 26	@ Pirates	6–5	**Charles Hudson** (2–1)	Larry McWilliams (0–2)	**Steve Bedrosian** (3)	16,373	7–7
15	April 27	@ Pirates	5–13	Mike Bielecki (1–0)	**Steve Carlton** (1–3)	Bob Walk (1)	17,218	7–8
16	April 29	Astros	12–4	**Shane Rawley** (3–1)	Nolan Ryan (3–3)	None	16,313	8–8
17	April 30	Astros	0–1	Mike Scott (3–2)	**Kevin Gross** (1–3)	Dave Smith (7)	17,134	8–9

May (12–15)

#	Date	Opponent	Score	Win	Loss	Save	Attendance	Record
18	May 2	Braves	1–7	David Palmer (2–1)	**Steve Carlton** (1–4)	None	20,237	8–10
19	May 3	Braves	4–10	Rick Mahler (2–4)	**Shane Rawley** (3–2)	None	20,511	8–11
20	May 4	Braves	5–1	**Kevin Gross** (2–3)	Joe Johnson (3–2)	None	37,352	9–11
21	May 5	Expos	4–6	Dan Schatzeder (1–0)	**Kent Tekulve** (0–1)	Jeff Reardon (3)	15,425	9–12
22	May 6	Expos	0–8	Andy McGaffigan (2–0)	**Steve Carlton** (1–5)	None	16,528	9–13
23	May 7	Expos	2–8	Floyd Youmans (1–3)	**Shane Rawley** (3–3)	Tim Burke (3)	15,840	9–14
24	May 9	@ Braves	7–6	**Kevin Gross** (3–3)	Joe Johnson (3–3)	**Steve Bedrosian** (4)	11,817	10–14
25	May 10	@ Braves	1–3	Zane Smith (3–2)	**Charles Hudson** (2–2)	Paul Assenmacher (2)	25,958	10–15
26	May 11	@ Braves	2–1	**Steve Bedrosian** (2–1)	Craig McMurtry (1–2)	None	15,689	11–15
27	May 12	@ Astros	5–1	**Shane Rawley** (4–3)	Jim Deshaies (0–1)	None	8,354	12–15
28	May 13	@ Astros	2–3 (11)	Julio Solano (2–0)	**Dave Rucker** (0–1)	None	7,087	12–16
29	May 14	Reds	8–6	**Don Carman** (1–0)	John Franco (0–1)	**Steve Bedrosian** (5)	21,877	13–16
30	May 15	Reds	5–6	Ron Robinson (3–0)	**Steve Bedrosian** (2–2)	None	20,767	13–17
31	May 16	@ Giants	3–0	**Steve Carlton** (2–5)	Roger Mason (2–3)	**Kent Tekulve** (1)	16,560	14–17
32	May 17	@ Giants	7–12	Mike Krukow (5–3)	**Shane Rawley** (4–4)	Greg Minton (4)	14,260	14–18
33	May 18	@ Giants	1–4	Scott Garrelts (4–3)	**Freddie Toliver** (0–1)	Jeff Robinson (4)	31,186	14–19
34	May 20	@ Padres	3–4	Eric Show (3–2)	**Kevin Gross** (3–4)	Rich Gossage (8)	13,997	14–20
35	May 21	@ Padres	2–7	Dave Dravecky (4–3)	**Charles Hudson** (2–3)	None	12,674	14–21
36	May 22	@ Padres	2–6	Andy Hawkins (3–3)	**Steve Carlton** (2–6)	Craig Lefferts (1)	21,173	14–22
37	May 23	@ Dodgers	8–2	**Shane Rawley** (5–4)	Jerry Reuss (2–3)	None	39,354	15–22
38	May 24	@ Dodgers	0–6	Fernando Valenzuela (7–2)	**Freddie Toliver** (0–2)	None	47,725	15–23
39	May 25	@ Dodgers	2–5	Orel Hershiser (5–3)	**Kevin Gross** (3–5)	None	40,424	15–24
40	May 27	Giants	6–2	**Steve Carlton** (3–6)	Jeff Robinson (2–1)	None	16,023	16–24
41	May 28	Giants	4–0	**Shane Rawley** (6–4)	Scott Garrelts (4–5)	None	17,003	17–24
42	May 29	Giants	5–4	**Don Carman** (2–0)	Greg Minton (2–3)	None	17,785	18–24
43	May 30	Padres	2–0	**Kevin Gross** (4–5)	Eric Show (3–3)	None	10,608	19–24
44	May 31	Padres	1–0	**Charles Hudson** (3–3)	Dave Dravecky (5–4)	**Steve Bedrosian** (6)	21,211	20–24

June (15–13)

#	Date	Opponent	Score	Win	Loss	Save	Attendance	Record
45	June 1	Padres	16–5	**Steve Carlton** (4–6)	Andy Hawkins (3–4)	None	35,144	21–24
46	June 2	Dodgers	13–2	**Shane Rawley** (7–4)	Jerry Reuss (2–5)	None	21,476	22–24
47	June 3	Dodgers	4–11	Fernando Valenzuela (8–3)	**Mike Maddux** (0–1)	None	24,373	22–25
48	June 4	Dodgers	8–7	**Kevin Gross** (5–5)	Orel Hershiser (5–4)	**Steve Bedrosian** (7)	26,983	23–25
49	June 5	@ Expos	7–3	**Charles Hudson** (4–3)	Jay Tibbs (3–2)	None	10,845	24–25
50	June 6	@ Expos	9–10 (10)	Tim Burke (3–1)	**Dave Rucker** (0–2)	None	18,325	24–26
51	June 7	@ Expos	3–1	**Shane Rawley** (8–4)	Andy McGaffigan (3–2)	None	20,486	25–26
52	June 8	@ Expos	0–12	Floyd Youmans (5–5)	**Mike Maddux** (0–2)	None	20,743	25–27
53	June 9	@ Mets	3–2 (10)	**Don Carman** (3–0)	Doug Sisk (0–1)	**Steve Bedrosian** (8)	26,050	26–27
54	June 10	@ Mets	4–8 (11)	Roger McDowell (6–0)	**Randy Lerch** (0–1)	None	27,472	26–28
55	June 11	@ Mets	3–5	Ron Darling (7–2)	**Steve Carlton** (4–7)	Jesse Orosco (11)	27,830	26–29
56	June 13	Expos	2–1	**Shane Rawley** (9–4)	Tim Burke (4–2)	None	24,491	27–29
57	June 14	Expos	7–6	**Randy Lerch** (1–1)	Bert Roberge (0–2)	**Steve Bedrosian** (9)	25,769	28–29
58	June 15	Expos	0–2	Andy McGaffigan (4–2)	**Charles Hudson** (4–4)	Jeff Reardon (15)	30,242	28–30
59	June 16	@ Cubs	5–7	Jamie Moyer (1–0)	**Steve Carlton** (4–8)	Lee Smith (9)	20,614	28–31
60	June 17	@ Cubs	11–8	**Kent Tekulve** (1–1)	Ray Fontenot (2–2)	None	27,114	29–31
61	June 18	@ Cubs	4–5 (10)	Lee Smith (4–4)	**Steve Bedrosian** (2–3)	None	38,093	29–32
62	June 19	Cardinals	5–3	**Kevin Gross** (6–5)	Ray Burris (3–3)	**Don Carman** (1)	22,376	30–32
63	June 20	Cardinals	2–9	Bob Forsch (6–4)	**Charles Hudson** (4–5)	None	25,292	30–33
64	June 21	Cardinals	6–8	Todd Worrell (4–7)	**Don Carman** (3–1)	Ken Dayley (3)	38,601	30–34
65	June 22	Cardinals	4–7	Greg Mathews (4–1)	**Mike Maddux** (0–3)	Todd Worrell (13)	32,570	30–35
66	June 23	Cubs	19–1	**Shane Rawley** (10–4)	Jamie Moyer (1–1)	None	21,899	31–35
67	June 24	Cubs	7–6 (10)	**Steve Bedrosian** (3–3)	Lee Smith (4–5)	None	24,757	32–35
68	June 25	Cubs	7–10	Guy Hoffman (3–2)	**Charles Hudson** (4–6)	Lee Smith (11)	22,085	32–36
69	June 27	@ Cardinals	2–1 (17)	**Kent Tekulve** (2–1)	Rick Ownbey (1–2)	**Tom Hume** (1)	37,903	33–36
70	June 28	@ Cardinals	7–4 (10)	**Steve Bedrosian** (4–3)	Pat Perry (1–2)	**Tom Hume** (2)	43,513	34–36
71	June 29	@ Cardinals	8–7	**Steve Bedrosian** (5–3)	Todd Worrell (5–8)	None	42,959	35–36
72	June 30	@ Pirates	2–3	Bob Walk (3–4)	**Charles Hudson** (4–7)	Cecilio Guante (4)	5,881	35–37

July (14–13)

#	Date	Opponent	Score	Win	Loss	Save	Attendance	Record
73	July 1	@ Pirates	5–4 (12)	**Tom Hume** (1–0)	Larry McWilliams (1–5)	None	8,118	36–37
74	July 2	@ Pirates	3–4	Rick Rhoden (9–4)	**Don Carman** (3–2)	None	6,782	36–38
75	July 3	Reds	7–3	**Bruce Ruffin** (1–0)	John Denny (5–8)	**Tom Hume** (3)	61,475	37–38
76	July 4	Reds	1–4	Tom Browning (6–7)	**Kevin Gross** (6–6)	Ron Robinson (6)	20,490	37–39
77	July 5	Reds	2–7	Chris Welsh (3–2)	**Charles Hudson** (4–8)	None	23,620	37–40
78	July 6	Reds	12–5	**Tom Hume** (2–0)	Joe Price (1–2)	**Kent Tekulve** (2)	28,420	38–40
79	July 7	Braves	7–3	**Shane Rawley** (11–4)	David Palmer (5–7)	**Steve Bedrosian** (10)	18,768	39–40
80	July 8	Braves	8–2	**Bruce Ruffin** (2–0)	Rick Mahler (10–7)	None	22,202	40–40
81	July 9	Braves	3–7	Doyle Alexander (6–4)	**Kevin Gross** (6–7)	Gene Garber (10)	27,371	40–41
82	July 10	@ Astros	4–11	Mark Knudson (1–3)	**Charles Hudson** (4–9)	None	18,289	40–42
83	July 11	@ Astros	4–1	**Don Carman** (4–2)	Mike Scott (9–6)	**Steve Bedrosian** (11)	18,047	41–42
84	July 12	@ Astros	3–4	Nolan Ryan (6–6)	**Shane Rawley** (11–5)	Dave Smith (17)	17,491	41–43
85	July 13	@ Astros	5–4 (11)	**Steve Bedrosian** (6–3)	Dave Smith (1–6)	None	20,597	42–43
–	July 15	**1986 Major League Baseball All-Star Game at the Astrodome in Houston**						
86	July 17	@ Reds	6–7 (11)	Ted Power (4–5)	**Tom Gorman** (0–1)	None	24,488	42–44
87	July 18	@ Reds	5–6	Tom Browning (9–7)	**Bruce Ruffin** (2–1)	John Franco (15)	24,072	42–45
88	July 19	@ Reds	2–5	Bill Gullickson (7–6)	**Shane Rawley** (11–6)	Ron Robinson (8)	20,994	42–46
89	July 20	@ Reds	9–3	**Charles Hudson** (5–9)	John Denny (6–9)	None	26,190	43–46
90	July 21	@ Braves	3–1	**Kent Tekulve** (3–1)	Jeff Dedmon (3–5)	**Steve Bedrosian** (12)	12,731	44–46
91	July 22	@ Braves	5–4 (11)	**Steve Bedrosian** (7–3)	Craig McMurtry (1–6)	**Tom Hume** (4)	14,249	45–46
92	July 23	@ Braves	4–2	**Bruce Ruffin** (3–1)	Doyle Alexander (6–6)	None	11,770	46–46
93	July 24	Astros	3–9	Mike Scott (10–6)	**Shane Rawley** (11–7)	None	31,094	46–47
94	July 25	Astros	4–2	**Charles Hudson** (6–9)	Jim Deshaies (5–3)	**Steve Bedrosian** (13)	23,387	47–47
95	July 26	Astros	3–2	**Don Carman** (5–2)	Mark Knudson (1–4)	**Dan Schatzeder** (2)	34,075	48–47
96	July 27	Astros	2–3	Nolan Ryan (7–7)	**Kevin Gross** (6–8)	Aurelio López (4)	33,192	48–48
97	July 28	Cardinals	1–3	Danny Cox (5–8)	**Bruce Ruffin** (3–2)	None	21,553	48–49
98	July 29	Cardinals	12–7	**Tom Hume** (3–0)	Tim Conroy (3–6)	None	21,970	49–49
99	July 30	Cardinals	3–6	Bob Forsch (10–6)	**Charles Hudson** (6–10)	Todd Worrell (21)	24,324	49–50

August (19–12)

#	Date	Opponent	Score	Win	Loss	Save	Attendance	Record
100	August 1	Cubs	4–3 (11)	**Kent Tekulve** (4–1)	Frank DiPino (1–6)	None	25,892	50–50
101	August 2	Cubs	12–2	**Kevin Gross** (7–8)	Scott Sanderson (5–8)	None	22,062	51–50
102	August 3	Cubs	6–2	**Steve Bedrosian** (8–3)	Frank DiPino (1–7)	None	27,330	52–50
103	August 4	@ Cardinals	2–3	Todd Worrell (7–8)	**Dan Schatzeder** (3–3)	None	27,059	52–51
104	August 5	@ Cardinals	4–7	Bob Forsch (11–6)	**Mike Maddux** (0–4)	None	24,870	52–52
105	August 6	@ Cardinals	1–2	Greg Mathews (7–3)	**Don Carman** (5–3)	Todd Worrell (22)	32,714	52–53
106	August 7	@ Cardinals	5–6	John Tudor (11–5)	**Kevin Gross** (7–9)	Todd Worrell (23)	23,171	52–54
107	August 8	@ Cubs	1–2	Steve Trout (5–5)	**Bruce Ruffin** (3–3)	Lee Smith (21)	27,811	52–55
108	August 9	@ Cubs	4–2	**Charles Hudson** (7–10)	Dennis Eckersley (6–7)	**Steve Bedrosian** (14)	33,003	53–55
109	August 10	@ Cubs	0–4	Ed Lynch (3–1)	**Mike Maddux** (0–5)	None	30,009	53–56
110	August 11	Mets	4–8	Dwight Gooden (12–4)	**Don Carman** (5–4)	None	43,133	53–57
111	August 12	Mets	3–1	**Kevin Gross** (8–9)	Rick Aguilera (6–4)	None	36,442	54–57
112	August 13	Mets	8–4	**Bruce Ruffin** (4–3)	Bob Ojeda (12–4)	None	39,041	55–57
113	August 14	Pirates	8–7	**Kent Tekulve** (5–1)	Barry Jones (1–2)	None	20,643	56–57
114	August 15 (1)	Pirates	5–6	Cecilio Guante (5–2)	**Dan Schatzeder** (3–4)	Don Robinson (8)	see 2nd game	56–58
115	August 15 (2)	Pirates	3–2	**Mike Maddux** (1–5)	Jim Winn (2–5)	**Steve Bedrosian** (15)	27,724	57–58
116	August 16 (1)	Pirates	1–6	Rick Rhoden (13–7)	**Kevin Gross** (8–10)	None	see 2nd game	57–59
117	August 16 (2)	Pirates	6–0	**Tom Hume** (4–0)	Larry McWilliams (2–9)	**Kent Tekulve** (3)	31,349	58–59
118	August 17	Pirates	5–1 (5)	**Bruce Ruffin** (5–3)	Rick Reuschel (7–14)	None	34,298	59–59
119	August 19	@ Giants	6–5	**Kent Tekulve** (6–1)	Scott Garrelts (10–9)	**Steve Bedrosian** (16)	10,316	60–59
120	August 20	@ Giants	1–0 (10)	**Don Carman** (6–4)	Mike Krukow (12–7)	**Steve Bedrosian** (17)	10,723	61–59
121	August 21	@ Giants	6–7	Mark Davis (4–4)	**Kent Tekulve** (6–2)	Scott Garrelts (5)	7,959	61–60
122	August 22	@ Padres	4–1	**Bruce Ruffin** (6–3)	Ed Whitson (6–8)	None	16,296	62–60
123	August 23	@ Padres	3–4 (12)	Lance McCullers (6–6)	**Kent Tekulve** (6–3)	None	25,884	62–61
124	August 24	@ Padres	6–5	**Kent Tekulve** (7–3)	Rich Gossage (5–6)	**Steve Bedrosian** (18)	13,409	63–61
125	August 25	@ Dodgers	1–3	Fernando Valenzuela (16–9)	**Don Carman** (6–5)	None	35,553	63–62
126	August 26	@ Dodgers	6–4	**Kevin Gross** (9–10)	Ed Vande Berg (1–5)	None	30,979	64–62
127	August 27	@ Dodgers	2–1	**Bruce Ruffin** (7–3)	Bob Welch (6–10)	**Steve Bedrosian** (19)	23,543	65–62
128	August 29	Giants	6–4	**Mike Maddux** (2–5)	Mike Krukow (13–8)	**Steve Bedrosian** (20)	21,572	66–62
129	August 30	Giants	5–3	**Don Carman** (7–5)	Mike LaCoss (9–10)	**Steve Bedrosian** (21)	23,022	67–62
130	August 31	Giants	4–3	**Kent Tekulve** (8–3)	Vida Blue (9–9)	**Steve Bedrosian** (22)	24,082	68–62

September (16–12)

#	Date	Opponent	Score	Win	Loss	Save	Attendance	Record
131	September 1	Padres	5–4	**Kent Tekulve** (9–3)	Craig Lefferts (7–6)	None	25,385	69–62
132	September 2	Padres	2–6	Dave LaPoint (4–7)	**Jeff Bittiger** (0–1)	None	15,553	69–63
133	September 3	Padres	5–6	Bob Stoddard (1–0)	**Steve Bedrosian** (8–4)	Lance McCullers (3)	15,066	69–64
134	September 5	Dodgers	4–0	**Don Carman** (8–5)	Orel Hershiser (12–11)	**Steve Bedrosian** (23)	15,245	70–64
135	September 6	Dodgers	2–3	Fernando Valenzuela (18–9)	**Kevin Gross** (9–11)	None	22,394	70–65
136	September 7	Dodgers	2–1	**Kent Tekulve** (10–3)	Ken Howell (5–10)	None	25,706	71–65
137	September 8	@ Cubs	4–7	Ed Lynch (5–4)	**Mike Maddux** (2–6)	Lee Smith (26)	6,857	71–66
138	September 9	@ Cubs	6–8 (10)	Lee Smith (9–9)	**Steve Bedrosian** (8–5)	None	8,785	71–67
139	September 10	@ Cubs	7–8	Guy Hoffman (5–2)	**Kent Tekulve** (10–4)	Lee Smith (27)	9,029	71–68
140	September 12	Mets	6–3	**Bruce Ruffin** (8–3)	Dwight Gooden (14–6)	**Steve Bedrosian** (24)	43,070	72–68
141	September 13	Mets	6–5	**Dan Schatzeder** (4–4)	Roger McDowell (13–8)	**Steve Bedrosian** (25)	47,108	73–68
142	September 14	Mets	6–0	**Kevin Gross** (10–11)	Sid Fernandez (15–5)	None	38,652	74–68
143	September 15	Pirates	5–0	**Don Carman** (9–5)	Rick Rhoden (15–9)	None	14,089	75–68
144	September 16	Pirates	9–5	**Kent Tekulve** (11–4)	Mike Bielecki (6–11)	None	14,315	76–68
145	September 17	Cardinals	5–8	Bob Forsch (14–8)	**Bruce Ruffin** (8–4)	Todd Worrell (34)	15,737	76–69
146	September 18	Cardinals	4–3	**Mike Maddux** (3–6)	Greg Mathews (10–7)	**Steve Bedrosian** (26)	12,847	77–69
147	September 19	@ Mets	4–3	**Kevin Gross** (11–11)	Sid Fernandez (15–6)	**Steve Bedrosian** (27)	35,023	78–69
148	September 20	@ Mets	5–9	Ron Darling (14–5)	**Tom Hume** (4–1)	None	39,104	78–70
149	September 21	@ Mets	7–1	**Marvin Freeman** (1–0)	John Mitchell (0–1)	None	42,631	79–70
150	September 22	@ Pirates	8–4	**Jeff Bittiger** (1–1)	Bob Kipper (5–8)	None	3,934	80–70
151	September 23	@ Pirates	5–6	Barry Jones (3–4)	**Steve Bedrosian** (8–6)	None	3,631	80–71
152	September 24	@ Cardinals	1–7	Danny Cox (11–12)	**Kevin Gross** (11–12)	None	21,272	80–72
153	September 25	@ Cardinals	4–5	Ray Soff (4–0)	**Dan Schatzeder** (4–5)	Todd Worrell (35)	15,595	80–73
154	September 26	@ Expos	5–0	**Marvin Freeman** (2–0)	Sergio Valdez (0–4)	**Kent Tekulve** (4)	6,133	81–73
155	September 27	@ Expos	1–0	**Don Carman** (10–5)	Floyd Youmans (13–11)	**Steve Bedrosian** (28)	6,493	82–73
156	September 28	@ Expos	5–2	**Kevin Gross** (12–12)	Dennis Martínez (3–6)	**Steve Bedrosian** (29)	10,064	83–73
157	September 29	Cubs	3–8	Greg Maddux (2–4)	**Mike Maddux** (3–7)	None	14,355	83–74
158	September 30	Cubs	9–2	**Bruce Ruffin** (9–4)	Drew Hall (1–2)	None	13,377	84–74

October (2–1)

#	Date	Opponent	Score	Win	Loss	Save	Attendance	Record
–	October 1	Cubs	Cancelled (rain); Was not rescheduled					
159	October 3	Expos	5–6	Andy McGaffigan (10–5)	**Kent Tekulve** (11–5)	Randy St. Claire (1)	11,614	84–75
160	October 4	Expos	5–4 (14)	**Dan Schatzeder** (5–5)	Bert Roberge (0–4)	None	16,796	85–75
161	October 5	Expos	2–1 (10)	**Dan Schatzeder** (6–5)	Curt Brown (0–1)	None	25,293	86–75

=== Roster ===
1986 Philadelphia Phillies
**Roster**
**Pitchers**: 47 Larry Andersen; 40 Steve Bedrosian; 34 Jeff Bittiger; 32 Steve Carlton; 42 Don Carman; 50 Rocky Childress; 48 Marvin Freeman; 33 Tom Gorman; 46 Kevin Gross; 49 Charles Hudson; 41 Tom Hume; 33 Mike Jackson; 35 Randy Lerch; 44 Mike Maddux; 28 Shane Rawley; 39 Dave Rucker; 47 Bruce Ruffin; 38 Dave Stewart; 27 Kent Tekulve; 43 Freddie Toliver	**Catchers**: 10 Darren Daulton; 29 Ronn Reynolds; 6 John Russell; **Infielders**: 16 Luis Aguayo; 11 Tom Foley; 9 Von Hayes; 30 Steve Jeltz; 18,11 Greg Legg; 18 Francisco Meléndez; 8 Juan Samuel; 20 Mike Schmidt; 15 Rick Schu	**Outfielders**: 21 Greg Gross; 26 Chris James; 23 Joe Lefebvre; 31 Garry Maddox; 22 Gary Redus; 14 Jeff Stone; 24 Milt Thompson; 12 Glenn Wilson; 17 Ron Roenicke	**Manager**: 7 John Felske; **Coaches**: 2 Jim Davenport (Third Base); 4 Lee Elia (Bench); 3 Claude Osteen (Pitching); 5 Mike Ryan (Bullpen); 25 Del Unser (Hitting & First Base)

== Player stats ==
=== Batting ===
==== Starters by position ====
Note: Pos = Position; G = Games played; AB = At bats; H = Hits; Avg. = Batting average; HR = Home runs; RBI = Runs batted in

Pos	Player	G	AB	H	Avg.	HR	RBI
C	John Russell	93	315	76	.241	13	60
1B	Von Hayes	158	610	186	.305	19	98
2B	Juan Samuel	145	591	157	.266	16	78
SS	Steve Jeltz	145	439	96	.219	0	36
3B	Mike Schmidt	160	552	160	.290	37	119
LF	Gary Redus	90	340	84	.247	11	33
CF	Milt Thompson	96	299	75	.251	6	23
RF	Glenn Wilson	155	584	158	.271	15	84

==== Other batters ====
Note: G = Games played; AB = At bats; H = Hits; Avg. = Batting average; HR = Home runs; RBI = Runs batted in

Player	G	AB	H	Avg.	HR	RBI
Ron Roenicke	102	275	68	.247	5	42
Jeff Stone	82	249	69	.277	6	19
Rick Schu	92	208	57	.274	8	25
Darren Daulton	49	138	31	.225	8	21
Luis Aguayo	62	133	28	.211	4	13
Ronn Reynolds	43	126	27	.214	3	10
Greg Gross	87	101	25	.248	0	8
Tom Foley	39	61	18	.295	0	5
Chris James	16	46	13	.283	1	5
Greg Legg	11	20	9	.450	0	1
Joe Lefebvre	14	18	2	.111	0	1
Francisco Meléndez	9	8	2	.250	0	0
Garry Maddox	6	7	3	.429	0	1

=== Pitching ===
==== Starting pitchers ====
Note: G = Games pitched; IP = Innings pitched; W = Wins; L = Losses; ERA = Earned run average; SO = Strikeouts

Player	G	IP	W	L	ERA	SO
Kevin Gross	37	241.2	12	12	4.02	154
Shane Rawley	23	157.2	11	7	3.54	73
Bruce Ruffin	21	146.1	9	4	2.46	70
Charles Hudson	33	144.0	7	10	4.94	82
Steve Carlton	16	83.0	4	8	6.18	62
Mike Maddux	16	78.0	3	7	5.42	44
Freddie Toliver	5	25.2	0	2	3.51	20
Marvin Freeman	3	16.0	2	0	2.25	8
Jeff Bittiger	3	14.2	1	1	5.52	8

==== Other pitchers ====
Note: G = Games pitched; IP = Innings pitched; W = Wins; L = Losses; ERA = Earned run average; SO = Strikeouts

Player	G	IP	W	L	ERA	SO
Don Carman	50	134.1	10	5	3.22	98

==== Relief pitchers ====
Note: G = Games pitched; W = Wins; L = Losses; SV = Saves; ERA = Earned run average; SO = Strikeouts

Player	G	W	L	SV	ERA	SO
Steve Bedrosian	68	8	6	29	3.39	82
Kent Tekulve	73	11	5	4	2.54	57
Tom Hume	48	4	1	4	2.77	51
Dan Schatzeder	25	3	3	1	3.38	14
Dave Rucker	19	0	2	0	5.76	14
Larry Andersen	10	0	0	0	4.26	9
Mike Jackson	9	0	0	0	3.38	3
Dave Stewart	8	0	0	0	6.57	9
Tom Gorman	8	0	1	0	7.71	8
Randy Lerch	4	1	1	0	7.88	5
Rocky Childress	2	0	0	0	6.75	1
Greg Gross	1	0	0	0	0.00	2

== Awards and honors ==
- Garry Maddox, Roberto Clemente Award
- Mike Schmidt, National League MVP

== Farm system ==
Level	Team	League	Manager
AAA	Portland Beavers	Pacific Coast League	Bill Dancy
AA	Reading Phillies	Eastern League	George Culver
A	Clearwater Phillies	Florida State League	Ron Clark
A	Spartanburg Phillies	South Atlantic League	Roly de Armas
A-Short Season	Utica Blue Sox	New York–Penn League	Tony Taylor
A-Short Season	Bend Phillies	Northwest League	Ed Pebley
