= 1986 Pittsburgh Pirates season =

1986 Pittsburgh Pirates
- League: National League
- Division: East
- Ballpark: Three Rivers Stadium
- City: Pittsburgh, Pennsylvania
- Record: 64–98 (.395)
- Divisional place: 6th
- Owners: Pittsburgh Associates
- General managers: Syd Thrift
- Managers: Jim Leyland
- Television: KDKA-TV (Steve Blass, Alan Cutler, John Sanders); Pirates Cable Network (Steve Blass, Mike Lange)
- Radio: KDKA-AM (Lanny Frattare, Jim Rooker)

The 1986 Pittsburgh Pirates season was the 105th season of the Pittsburgh Pirates franchise; and their 100th in the National League. This was their 17th season at Three Rivers Stadium. The Pirates finished sixth and last in the National League East with a record of 64–98. This was also the rookie season of left fielder Barry Bonds, who led the Pirates with 36 stolen bases and finished second on the club with 16 home runs.

== Regular season ==
=== Season standings ===
NL East
Team	W	L	Pct.	GB	Home	Road
New York Mets	108	54	.667	—	55‍–‍26	53‍–‍28
Philadelphia Phillies	86	75	.534	21½	49‍–‍31	37‍–‍44
St. Louis Cardinals	79	82	.491	28½	42‍–‍39	37‍–‍43
Montreal Expos	78	83	.484	29½	36‍–‍44	42‍–‍39
Chicago Cubs	70	90	.438	37	42‍–‍38	28‍–‍52
Pittsburgh Pirates	64	98	.395	44	31‍–‍50	33‍–‍48

=== Game log ===
1986 Game Log: 64–98 (Home: 31–50; Away: 33–48)
April: 7–10 (Home: 3–5; Away: 4–5)

#	Date	Opponent	Score	Win	Loss	Save	Attendance	Record
1	April 8	Mets	2–4	Gooden	**Reuschel** (0–1)	—	48,962	0–1
2	April 11	Cubs	4–5	Trout	**McWilliams** (0–1)	Smith	2,490	0–2
3	April 12	Cubs	3–1	**Rhoden** (1–0)	Smith	**Guante** (1)	5,623	1–2
4	April 13	Cubs	8–0	**Reuschel** (1–1)	Sutcliffe	—	9,337	2–2
5	April 14	@ Phillies	3–1 (10)	**Guante** (1–0)	Bedrosian	**Winn** (1)	16,200	3–2
6	April 18	@ Cubs	4–0	**Rhoden** (2–0)	Sutcliffe	—	38,151	4–2
7	April 19	@ Cubs	14–8	**Reuschel** (2–1)	Sanderson	—	26,932	5–2
8	April 20	@ Cubs	10–8 (17)	**Jones** (1–0)	DiPino	—	18,508	6–2
9	April 21	@ Mets	5–6	McDowell	**Clements** (0–1)	—	10,282	6–3
10	April 22	@ Mets	1–7	Ojeda	**Kipper** (0–1)	—	15,668	6–4
11	April 24	Phillies	2–4	Rawley	**Rhoden** (2–1)	—	14,622	6–5
12	April 25	Phillies	3–6	Gross	**Reuschel** (2–2)	Bedrosian	11,847	6–6
13	April 26	Phillies	5–6	Hudson	**McWilliams** (0–2)	Bedrosian	16,373	6–7
14	April 27	Phillies	13–5	**Bielecki** (1–0)	Carlton	**Walk** (1)	17,218	7–7
15	April 28	@ Dodgers	1–2	Valenzuela	**Kipper** (0–2)	—	50,401	7–8
16	April 29	@ Dodgers	4–5	Hershiser	**Patterson** (0–1)	Howell	30,342	7–9
17	April 30	@ Giants	5–6 (12)	Garrelts	**Patterson** (0–2)	—	5,147	7–10

May: 11–15 (Home: 4–12; Away: 7–3)

#	Date	Opponent	Score	Win	Loss	Save	Attendance	Record
18	May 1	@ Giants	6–2	**Walk** (1–0)	Krukow	—	3,927	8–10
19	May 2	@ Padres	4–0	**Bielecki** (2–0)	Dravecky	**Winn** (2)	19,417	9–10
20	May 3	@ Padres	7–6	**Guante** (2–0)	Gossage	**Clements** (1)	20,515	10–10
21	May 4	@ Padres	5–2	**Winn** (1–0)	Lefferts	—	21,727	11–10
22	May 6	Giants	2–7	Krukow	**Reuschel** (2–3)	—	7,461	11–11
23	May 7	Giants	5–7	Laskey	**McWilliams** (0–3)	Robinson	6,300	11–12
24	May 8	Giants	8–2	**Bielecki** (3–0)	Garrelts	—	6,072	12–12
25	May 9	Astros	2–3	Kerfeld	**Winn** (1–1)	Smith	17,296	12–13
26	May 10	Astros	3–6	Knepper	**Rhoden** (2–2)	DiPino	13,344	12–14
27	May 11	Astros	4–3 (12)	**DeLeon** (1–0)	Kerfeld	—	13,170	13–14
28	May 13	Padres	2–4	Show	**Bielecki** (3–1)	McCullers	5,392	13–15
29	May 14	Padres	4–10	Dravecky	**Kipper** (0–3)	Gossage	9,430	13–16
30	May 16	@ Reds	2–7	Denny	**Rhoden** (2–3)	Franco	21,097	13–17
31	May 17	@ Reds	4–0	**Reuschel** (3–3)	Soto	—	32,204	14–17
32	May 18	@ Reds	3–7	Browning	**Bielecki** (3–2)	Robinson	22,962	14–18
33	May 20	@ Astros	4–2	**Walk** (2–0)	Ryan	—	8,711	15–18
34	May 21	@ Astros	2–1	**Rhoden** (3–3)	Scott	—	6,990	16–18
35	May 22	@ Astros	0–4	Knepper	**Reuschel** (3–4)	—	4,784	16–19
36	May 23	Reds	9–12 (12)	Power	**DeLeon** (1–1)	—	12,833	16–20
37	May 24	Reds	2–4	Gullickson	**Bielecki** (3–3)	—	18,631	16–21
38	May 25	Reds	4–7	Denny	**Kipper** (0–4)	—	19,568	16–22
39	May 26	Braves	4–9	Assenmacher	**Walk** (2–1)	—	14,102	16–23
40	May 27	Braves	2–6 (12)	Garber	**Walk** (2–2)	—	2,830	16–24
41	May 28	Braves	4–3	**McWilliams** (1–3)	Palmer	**DeLeon** (1)	6,860	17–24
42	May 30	Dodgers	4–6 (11)	Niedenfuer	**DeLeon** (1–2)	Reuss	25,320	17–25
43	May 31	Dodgers	4–0	**Kipper** (1–4)	Honeycutt	**Clements** (2)	15,709	18–25

June: 12–18 (Home: 8–8; Away: 4–10)

#	Date	Opponent	Score	Win	Loss	Save	Attendance	Record
44	June 1	Dodgers	12–3	**Rhoden** (4–3)	Welch	—	23,530	19–25
45	June 2	@ Braves	9–2	**Reuschel** (4–4)	Palmer	—	12,996	20–25
46	June 3	@ Braves	5–8	Mahler	**Guante** (2–1)	Assenmacher	10,649	20–26
47	June 4	@ Braves	12–3	**Bielecki** (4–3)	Johnson	**Winn** (3)	14,012	21–26
48	June 5	Mets	0–7	Ojeda	**Kipper** (1–5)	—	8,855	21–27
49	June 6	Mets	7–1	**Rhoden** (5–3)	Darling	**Walk** (2)		22–27
50	June 6	Mets	4–10	McDowell	**DeLeon** (1–3)	—	15,113	22–28
51	June 7	Mets	4–6	Gooden	**Reuschel** (4–5)	Orosco	29,770	22–29
52	June 8	Mets	3–4	Fernandez	**McWilliams** (1–4)	Orosco	14,391	22–30
53	June 9	Cubs	6–5 (11)	**Robinson** (1–0)	Baller	—	6,056	23–30
54	June 10	Cubs	6–4	**Kipper** (2–5)	Eckersley	**Guante** (2)	5,899	24–30
55	June 11	Cubs	5–3	**Rhoden** (6–3)	Hoffman	**Robinson** (3)	12,702	25–30
56	June 13	@ Mets	5–6	Orosco	**Clements** (0–2)	—	37,582	25–31
57	June 14	@ Mets	1–5	Fernandez	**Bielecki** (4–4)	—	47,664	25–32
58	June 15	@ Mets	1–4	Ojeda	**Walk** (2–3)	—		25–33
59	June 15	@ Mets	5–8	Aguilera	**Kipper** (2–6)	McDowell	41,847	25–34
60	June 16	Cardinals	2–4	Cox	**Rhoden** (6–4)	Worrell	7,834	25–35
61	June 17	Cardinals	2–7	Mathews	**Reuschel** (4–6)	—	9,424	25–36
62	June 18	Cardinals	2–1 (12)	**Robinson** (2–0)	Worrell	—	10,455	26–36
63	June 19	@ Expos	4–2	**Kipper** (3–6)	Smith	**Guante** (3)	11,918	27–36
64	June 20	@ Expos	2–7	McGaffigan	**Walk** (2–4)	McClure	16,223	27–37
65	June 21	@ Expos	14–1	**Rhoden** (7–4)	Tibbs	—	23,381	28–37
66	June 22	@ Expos	1–2	Hesketh	**Reuschel** (4–7)	Reardon	27,129	28–38
67	June 23	@ Cardinals	1–2 (11)	Worrell	**Clements** (0–3)	—	25,506	28–39
68	June 24	@ Cardinals	2–5	Burris	**Winn** (1–2)	Dayley	24,251	28–40
69	June 25	@ Cardinals	1–2 (10)	Horton	**Clements** (0–4)	—	29,146	28–41
70	June 27	Expos	7–1	**Rhoden** (8–4)	Tibbs	—	15,392	29–41
71	June 28	Expos	2–3	Hesketh	**Reuschel** (4–8)	Reardon	35,385	29–42
72	June 29	Expos	4–6	Youmans	**Bielecki** (4–5)	McClure	26,689	29–43
73	June 30	Phillies	3–2	**Walk** (3–4)	Hudson	**Guante** (4)	5,881	30–43

July: 11–14 (Home: 5–7; Away: 6–7)

#	Date	Opponent	Score	Win	Loss	Save	Attendance	Record
74	July 1	Phillies	4–5 (12)	Hume	**McWilliams** (1–5)	—	8,118	30–44
75	July 2	Phillies	4–3	**Rhoden** (9–4)	Carman	—	6,782	31–44
76	July 3	@ Dodgers	3–6	Welch	**Reuschel** (4–9)	—	30,722	31–45
77	July 4	@ Dodgers	6–4	**Bielecki** (5–5)	Valenzuela	—	46,315	32–45
78	July 5	@ Dodgers	5–0	**Walk** (4–4)	Hershiser	—	32,694	33–45
79	July 6	@ Dodgers	3–4	Honeycutt	**Winn** (1–3)	Howell	27,563	33–46
80	July 7	@ Padres	3–1 (10)	**Guante** (3–1)	Gossage	—	28,366	34–46
81	July 8	@ Padres	2–4	Hoyt	**Reuschel** (4–10)	Lefferts	16,051	34–47
82	July 9	@ Padres	6–4	**Bielecki** (6–5)	McCullers	**Robinson** (4)	15,816	35–47
83	July 10	@ Giants	3–6	Blue	**Walk** (4–5)	Garrelts	9,795	35–48
84	July 11	@ Giants	8–4	**Winn** (2–3)	Carlton	**Robinson** (5)	18,703	36–48
85	July 12	@ Giants	1–3	Krukow	**Rhoden** (9–5)	—	19,549	36–49
86	July 13	@ Giants	4–11	LaCoss	**Reuschel** (4–11)	—	36,877	36–50
87	July 17	Padres	1–2	McCullers	**Rhoden** (9–6)	Lefferts	8,865	36–51
88	July 18	Padres	12–7	**Reuschel** (5–11)	Hawkins	—	10,975	37–51
89	July 19	Padres	4–3	**Guante** (4–1)	Lefferts	—	8,559	38–51
90	July 20	Padres	4–2	**McWilliams** (2–5)	Dravecky	**Robinson** (6)	15,765	39–51
91	July 22	Dodgers	3–4	Powell	**Guante** (4–2)	Howell	10,325	39–52
92	July 23	Dodgers	5–6	Hershiser	**Reuschel** (5–12)	Howell	21,756	39–53
93	July 24	Dodgers	2–9	Valenzuela	**Walk** (4–6)	—	11,044	39–54
94	July 25	Giants	3–7	Mason	**Bielecki** (6–6)	Robinson	8,622	39–55
95	July 26	Giants	0–9	Carlton	**McWilliams** (2–6)	—	27,910	39–56
96	July 27	Giants	7–0	**Rhoden** (10–6)	Blue	**Robinson** (8)	10,767	40–56
97	July 28	@ Expos	7–4	**Reuschel** (6–12)	Smith	**Jones** (1)	16,221	41–56
98	July 30	@ Expos	2–3	Tibbs	**Winn** (2–4)	Reardon	12,672	41–57

August: 12–19 (Home: 6–10; Away: 6–9)

#	Date	Opponent	Score	Win	Loss	Save	Attendance	Record
99	August 1	Cardinals	4–0	**Rhoden** (11–6)	Mathews	—	9,794	42–57
100	August 2	Cardinals	3–7	Tudor	**McWilliams** (2–7)	—	14,233	42–58
101	August 3	Cardinals	3–0	**Reuschel** (7–12)	Cox	—	14,849	43–58
102	August 4	Expos	4–5	Tibbs	**Jones** (1–1)	Reardon	7,412	43–59
103	August 5	Expos	0–3	Martinez	**Bielecki** (6–7)	—	8,334	43–60
104	August 6	Expos	2–3	Youmans	**Rhoden** (11–7)	Reardon	6,649	43–61
105	August 7	Expos	4–5	McGaffigan	**Robinson** (2–1)	McClure	8,239	43–62
106	August 8	@ Cardinals	1–3	Cox	**Reuschel** (7–13)	Horton	36,244	43–63
107	August 9	@ Cardinals	8–5	**Walk** (5–6)	Burris	**Robinson** (9)	40,723	44–63
108	August 10	@ Cardinals	4–5	Forsch	**Bielecki** (6–8)	Worrell	36,286	44–64
109	August 11	@ Cubs	10–7	**Rhoden** (12–7)	Moyer	**Robinson** (10)	20,636	45–64
110	August 12	@ Cubs	1–3	Sanderson	**McWilliams** (2–8)	Smith	23,874	45–65
111	August 13	@ Cubs	8–9	DiPino	**Robinson** (2–2)	Smith	24,888	45–66
112	August 14	@ Phillies	7–8	Tekulve	**Jones** (1–2)	—	20,643	45–67
113	August 15	@ Phillies	6–5	**Guante** (5–2)	Schatzeder	**Robinson** (11)		46–67
114	August 15	@ Phillies	2–3	Maddux	**Winn** (2–5)	Bedrosian	27,724	46–68
115	August 16	@ Phillies	6–1	**Rhoden** (13–7)	Gross	—		47–68
116	August 16	@ Phillies	0–6	Hume	**McWilliams** (2–9)	Tekulve	31,349	47–69
117	August 17	@ Phillies	1–5 (5)	Ruffin	**Reuschel** (7–14)	—	34,298	47–70
118	August 18	Astros	0–3	Scott	**Walk** (5–7)	—	7,965	47–71
119	August 19	Astros	0–1	Deshaies	**Bielecki** (6–9)	Smith	9,128	47–72
120	August 20	Astros	4–1	**Rhoden** (14–7)	Knepper	—	16,997	48–72
121	August 22	Braves	16–5	**Winn** (3–5)	Mahler	**Jones** (2)	27,517	49–72
122	August 23	Braves	4–3	**Reuschel** (8–14)	Smith	**Robinson** (12)	15,535	50–72
123	August 24	Braves	4–3	**Walk** (6–7)	Alexander	**Robinson** (13)	15,681	51–72
124	August 25	Reds	4–5	Robinson	**McWilliams** (2–10)	Franco	8,093	51–73
125	August 26	Reds	4–5	Franco	**Krawczyk** (0–1)	—	7,022	51–74
126	August 27	Reds	5–9	Murphy	**Robinson** (3–3)	—	7,490	51–75
127	August 29	@ Astros	2–3	Scott	**Reuschel** (8–15)	Smith	22,801	51–76
128	August 30	@ Astros	13–3	**Rhoden** (15–7)	Deshaies	—	30,598	52–76
129	August 31	@ Astros	8–2	**Walk** (7–7)	Knepper	—	25,405	53–76

September: 9–19 (Home: 5–8; Away: 4–11)

#	Date	Opponent	Score	Win	Loss	Save	Attendance	Record
130	September 1	@ Reds	5–6	Power	**Bielecki** (6–10)	Franco	22,064	53–77
131	September 2	@ Reds	1–9	Gullickson	**Kipper** (3–7)	—	13,491	53–78
132	September 3	@ Reds	5–3 (10)	**Jones** (2–2)	Franco	—	12,200	54–78
133	September 5	@ Braves	3–4	Assenmacher	**Rhoden** (15–8)	—	6,992	54–79
134	September 6	@ Braves	2–4	Palmer	**Fansler** (0–1)	Dedmon	8,875	54–80
135	September 7	@ Braves	3–1	**Kipper** (4–7)	Speck	**Jones** (3)	6,021	55–80
136	September 8	Cardinals	3–2	**Patterson** (1–2)	Cox	**Pena** (1)	4,990	56–80
137	September 9	Cardinals	1–3	Horton	**Reuschel** (8–16)	Worrell	4,291	56–81
138	September 10	Cardinals	3–4	Soff	**Jones** (2–3)	Worrell	7,479	56–82
139	September 12	Cubs	8–9 (10)	DiPino	**Robinson** (3–4)	Gumpert	15,664	56–83
140	September 13	Cubs	5–2	**Patterson** (2–2)	Maddux	**Robinson** (14)	10,841	57–83
141	September 14	Cubs	9–2	**Reuschel** (9–16)	Hall	—	16,256	58–83
142	September 15	@ Phillies	0–5	Carman	**Rhoden** (15–9)	—	14,089	58–84
143	September 16	@ Phillies	5–9	Tekulve	**Bielecki** (6–11)	—	14,315	58–85
144	September 17	@ Expos	5–6	St. Claire	**Jones** (2–4)	Reardon		58–86
145	September 17	@ Expos	4–1	**Kipper** (5–7)	Sebra	**Robinson** (15)	5,774	59–86
146	September 18	@ Expos	3–1	**Smiley** (1–0)	Reardon	**Robinson** (16)	4,012	60–86
147	September 19	@ Cubs	2–8	Sanderson	**Pena** (0–1)	—	5,152	60–87
148	September 20	@ Cubs	0–1	Moyer	**Rhoden** (15–10)	Smith	22,710	60–88
149	September 21	@ Cubs	2–3	Sanderson	**Pena** (0–2)	Smith	22,336	60–89
150	September 22	Phillies	4–8	Bittiger	**Kipper** (5–8)	—	3,934	60–90
151	September 23	Phillies	6–5	**Jones** (3–4)	Bedrosian	—	3,631	61–90
152	September 24	Expos	2–1	**Robinson** (4–4)	McClure	—	3,092	62–90
153	September 25	Expos	4–8	Owchinko	**Rhoden** (15–11)	—	3,963	62–91
154	September 26	Mets	1–3	Fernandez	**Fansler** (0–2)	McDowell	14,080	62–92
155	September 27	Mets	2–4 (11)	Orosco	**McWilliams** (2–11)	Sisk	13,210	62–93
156	September 28	Mets	1–4 (11)	Aguilera	**Walk** (7–8)	—	30,606	62–94
157	September 30	@ Cardinals	3–5	Cox	**Rhoden** (15–12)	—	12,338	62–95

October: 2–3 (Home: 0–0; Away: 2–3)

#	Date	Opponent	Score	Win	Loss	Save	Attendance	Record
158	October 1	@ Cardinals	4–3	**McWilliams** (3–11)	Soff	**Robinson** (17)	16,039	63–95
159	October 2	@ Cardinals	5–1	**Kipper** (6–8)	Conroy	—	20,643	64–95
160	October 4	@ Mets	1–6	Ojeda	**Fansler** (0–3)	Orosco		64–96
161	October 4	@ Mets	2–5	Aguilera	**Patterson** (2–3)	McDowell	30,810	64–97
162	October 5	@ Mets	0–9	Darling	**Pena** (0–3)	Fernandez	32,170	64–98

Legend: = Win = Loss
Bold = Pirates team member

=== Record vs. opponents ===
1986 National League record Sources:
Team	ATL	CHC	CIN	HOU	LAD	MON	NYM	PHI	PIT	SD	SF	STL
Atlanta	—	9–3	6–12	5–13	10–8	4–7	4–8	4–8	5–7	12–6	7–11	6–6
Chicago	3–9	—	5–7	4–8	6–6	8–10	6–12	9–8	7–11	6–6	6–6	10–7
Cincinnati	12–6	7–5	—	4–14	10–8	7–5	4–8	7–5	10–2	9–9	9–9	7–5
Houston	13–5	8–4	14–4	—	10–8	8–4	5–7	6–6	6–6	10–8	9–9	7–5
Los Angeles	8–10	6–6	8–10	8–10	—	5–7	3–9	5–7	8–4	6–12	8–10	8–4
Montreal	7–4	10–8	5–7	4–8	5–7	—	8–10	8–10	11–7	4–8	5–7	9–9
New York	8–4	12–6	8–4	7–5	9–3	10–8	—	8–10	17–1	10–2	7–5	12–6
Philadelphia	8-4	8–9	5–7	6–6	7–5	10–8	10–8	—	11–7	6–6	9–3	6–12
Pittsburgh	7–5	11–7	2–10	6–6	4–8	7–11	1–17	7–11	—	8–4	4–8	7–11
San Diego	6–12	6–6	9–9	8–10	12–6	8–4	2–10	6–6	4–8	—	8–10	5–7
San Francisco	11–7	6–6	9–9	9–9	10–8	7–5	5–7	3–9	8–4	10–8	—	5–7
St. Louis	6–6	7–10	5–7	5–7	4–8	9–9	6–12	12–6	11–7	7–5	7–5	—

=== Detailed records ===
**National League**
Opponent	W	L	WP	RS	RA
**NL East**
Chicago Cubs	11	7	0.611	105	78
Montreal Expos	7	11	0.389	71	62
New York Mets	1	17	0.056	45	99
Philadelphia Phillies	7	11	0.389	74	87
St. Louis Cardinals	7	11	0.389	52	59
Total	33	57	0.367	347	385
**NL West**
Atlanta Braves	7	5	0.583	68	51
Cincinnati Reds	2	10	0.167	48	74
Houston Astros	6	6	0.500	42	32
Los Angeles Dodgers	4	8	0.333	52	49
San Diego Padres	8	4	0.667	54	45
San Francisco Giants	4	8	0.333	52	64
Total	31	41	0.431	316	315
Season Total	64	98	0.395	663	700

Month	Games	Won	Lost	Win %	RS	RA
April	17	7	10	0.412	87	74
May	26	11	15	0.423	100	120
June	30	12	18	0.400	132	124
July	25	11	14	0.440	102	111
August	31	12	19	0.387	138	126
September	28	9	19	0.321	92	121
October	5	2	3	0.400	12	24
Total	162	64	98	0.395	663	700

	Games	Won	Lost	Win %	RS	RA
Home	81	31	50	0.383	331	357
Away	81	33	48	0.407	332	343
Total	162	64	98	0.395	663	700

== Roster ==
1986 Pittsburgh Pirates
Roster
Pitchers: 34 Mike Bielecki; 15 Pat Clements; 25 José DeLeón; 54 Stan Fansler; 47 Cecilio Guante; 50 Barry Jones; 51 Bob Kipper; 46 Ray Krawczyk; 49 Larry McWilliams; 24,30 Bob Patterson; 16 Hipólito Peña; 48 Rick Reuschel; 29 Rick Rhoden; 43 Don Robinson; 36 Rich Sauveur; 57 John Smiley; 17 Bob Walk; 41 Jim Winn	Catchers: 26 Junior Ortiz; 6 Tony Peña; 7 Rubén Rodríguez; Infielders: 38 Rafael Belliard; 5 Sid Bream; 17 Jerry Dybzinski; 27 Sammy Khalifa; 2 Jim Morrison; 3 Johnny Ray; 13 Rich Renteria; 28 U L Washington	Outfielders: 12 Bill Almon; 7,24 Barry Bonds; 25 Bobby Bonilla; 4 Mike Brown; 13 Trench Davis; 10,59 Mike Diaz; 31 Benny Distefano; 23 Steve Kemp; 16 Lee Mazzilli; 11 Joe Orsulak; 23,39 R. J. Reynolds	Manager: 14 Jim Leyland; Coaches: 52 Rich Donnelly (Bullpen); 19 Mick Kelleher First base); 32 Gene Lamont (Third base); 37 Ron Schueler (Pitching); 18 Bill Virdon (Hitting)

=== Opening Day lineup ===
Opening Day Starters
#	Name	Position
39	R.J. Reynolds	RF
11	Joe Orsulak	CF
3	Johnny Ray	2B
5	Sid Bream	1B
23	Steve Kemp	LF
6	Tony Peña	C
2	Jim Morrison	3B
27	Sammy Khalifa	SS
48	Rick Reuschel	SP

== Player stats ==
= Indicates team leader

Batting

Note: G = Games played; AB = At bats; H = Hits; Avg. = Batting average; HR = Home runs; RBI = Runs batted in

Regular season
Player	G	AB	H	Avg.	HR	RBI
D. Robinson	50	6	4	0.667	0	1
J. Ortiz	49	110	37	0.336	0	14
R. Sauveur	3	3	1	0.333	0	0
J. Ray	155	579	174	0.301	7	78
T. Peña	144	510	147	0.288	10	52
R. Rhoden	41	90	25	0.278	1	10
J. Morrison	154	537	147	0.274	23	88
R. Reynolds	118	402	108	0.269	9	48
S. Bream	154	522	140	0.268	16	77
M. Diaz	97	209	56	0.268	12	36
R. Renteria	10	12	3	0.250	0	1
J. Orsulak	138	401	100	0.249	2	19
B. Bonilla	63	192	46	0.240	1	17
R. Belliard	117	309	72	0.233	0	31
L. Mazzilli	61	93	21	0.226	1	8
B. Bonds	113	413	92	0.223	16	48
B. Almon	102	196	43	0.219	7	27
M. Brown	87	243	53	0.218	4	26
B. Jones	26	5	1	0.200	0	1
U. Washington	72	135	27	0.200	0	10
S. Kemp	13	16	3	0.188	1	1
S. Khalifa	64	151	28	0.185	0	4
B. Distefano	31	39	7	0.179	1	5
S. Fansler	5	6	1	0.167	0	0
R. Reuschel	43	70	11	0.157	0	6
B. Walk	44	39	6	0.154	0	7
L. McWilliams	50	29	4	0.138	0	0
T. Davis	15	23	3	0.130	0	1
B. Patterson	11	8	1	0.125	0	0
M. Bielecki	31	48	3	0.063	0	1
J. Winn	50	16	1	0.063	0	0
B. Kipper	21	33	1	0.030	0	1
P. Clements	65	6	0	0.000	0	0
J. DeLeón	9	1	0	0.000	0	0
C. Guante	52	1	0	0.000	0	0
R. Rodríguez	2	3	0	0.000	0	0
R. Krawczyk	12	0	0	—	0	0
H. Peña	10	0	0	—	0	0
J. Smiley	12	0	0	—	0	0
Team totals	162	5,456	1,366	0.250	111	618

Pitching

Note: G = Games pitched; IP = Innings pitched; W = Wins; L = Losses; ERA = Earned run average; SO = Strikeouts

Regular season
Player	G	IP	W	L	ERA	SO
P. Clements	65	61	0	4	2.80	31
R. Rhoden	34	253 2/3	15	12	2.84	159
B. Jones	26	37 1/3	3	4	2.89	29
C. Guante	52	78	5	2	3.35	63
D. Robinson	50	69 1/3	3	4	3.38	53
J. Winn	50	88	3	5	3.58	70
B. Walk	44	141 2/3	7	8	3.75	78
S. Fansler	5	24	0	3	3.75	13
J. Smiley	12	11 2/3	1	0	3.86	9
R. Reuschel	35	215 2/3	9	16	3.96	125
B. Kipper	20	114	6	8	4.03	81
M. Bielecki	31	148 2/3	6	11	4.66	83
B. Patterson	11	36 1/3	2	3	4.95	20
L. McWilliams	49	122 1/3	3	11	5.15	80
R. Sauveur	3	12	0	0	6.00	6
R. Krawczyk	12	12 1/3	0	1	7.30	7
J. DeLeón	9	16 1/3	1	3	8.27	11
H. Peña	10	8 1/3	0	3	8.64	6
Team totals	162	1,450 2/3	64	98	3.90	924

== Awards and honors ==
- Barry Bonds, Led all rookies in home runs (16)

1986 Major League Baseball All-Star Game

- Tony Peña, C, reserve
- Rick Rhoden, P, reserve

== Transactions ==
- November 20, 1985 – Hired Jim Leyland as manager.
- December 10, 1985 – Bobby Bonilla drafted by the Chicago White Sox in the 1985 rule 5 draft.
- December 10, 1985 – Bip Roberts drafted by the San Diego Padres in the 1985 rule 5 draft.
- December 15, 1985 – Purchased Matias Carrillo from Poza Rica (Mexican).
- January 14, 1986 – Drafted Moisés Alou in the 1st round (2nd pick) of the 1986 amateur draft (January). Player signed May 23, 1986.
- January 14, 1986 – Drafted Archi Cianfrocco in the 11th round of the 1986 amateur draft (January), but did not sign the player.
- February 13, 1986 – Signed Ed Farmer as a free agent.
- April 1, 1986 – Traded Chris Green to the California Angels. Received Kevin Davis (minors).
- April 3, 1986 – Traded Marvell Wynne to the San Diego Padres. Received Bob Patterson.
- April 4, 1986 – Released Johnnie LeMaster.
- April 4, 1986 – Released Sixto Lezcano.
- April 4, 1986 – Traded Jason Thompson to the Montreal Expos. Received players to be named later. The Montreal Expos sent Ben Abner (minors) (April 7, 1986) and Ronnie Giddens (minors) (April 7, 1986) to the Pittsburgh Pirates to complete the trade.
- April 24, 1986 – Signed U.L. Washington as a free agent.
- May 1, 1986 – Released Ravelo Manzanillo.
- May 8, 1986 – Released Steve Kemp.
- June 2, 1986 – Drafted Jeff King in the 1st round (1st pick) of the 1986 amateur draft. Player signed July 10, 1986.
- June 2, 1986 – Drafted Mike Walker in the 2nd round of the 1986 amateur draft.
- June 2, 1986 – Drafted Scott Ruskin in the 3rd round of the 1986 amateur draft (June Secondary).
- June 2, 1986 – Drafted Archi Cianfrocco in the 4th round of the 1986 amateur draft (June Secondary), but did not sign the player.
- June 2, 1986 – Drafted Tom Goodwin in the 6th round of the 1986 amateur draft, but did not sign the player.
- June 2, 1986 – Drafted Tony Longmire in the 8th round of the 1986 amateur draft.
- June 2, 1986 – Drafted Stan Belinda in the 10th round of the 1986 amateur draft. Player signed June 5, 1986.
- June 2, 1986 – Drafted Keith Shepherd in the 11th round of the 1986 amateur draft. Player signed June 28, 1986.
- June 2, 1986 – Drafted Tommy Shields in the 15th round of the 1986 amateur draft.
- June 2, 1986 – Drafted Jeff Banister in the 25th round of the 1986 amateur draft.
- June 2, 1986 – Drafted Rick Reed in the 26th round of the 1986 amateur draft. Player signed July 2, 1986.
- June 2, 1986 – Drafted Mike Mordecai in the 33rd round of the 1986 amateur draft, but did not sign the player.
- July 13, 1986 – Signed Willie Smith as an amateur free agent.
- July 23, 1986 – Released Lee Mazzilli.
- July 23, 1986 – Traded José DeLeón to the Chicago White Sox. Received Bobby Bonilla.
- July 30, 1986 – Signed Julio Peguero as an amateur free agent.
- September 30, 1986 – Traded Jeff Zaske to the Texas Rangers. Received Randy Kramer.
- October 11, 1986 – Signed Mike York as a free agent.
- October 15, 1986 – Trench Davis granted free agency.

== Farm system ==
Level	Team	League	Manager
AAA	Hawaii Islanders	Pacific Coast League	Tommy Sandt
AA	Nashua Pirates	Eastern League	Dennis Rogers
A	Prince William Pirates	Carolina League	Rocky Bridges
A	Macon Pirates	South Atlantic League	Mike Quade
A-Short Season	Watertown Pirates	New York–Penn League	Ed Ott
Rookie	GCL Pirates	Gulf Coast League	Woody Huyke
