= 1986 Cincinnati Reds season =

1986 Cincinnati Reds
- League: National League
- Division: West
- Ballpark: Riverfront Stadium
- City: Cincinnati
- Record: 86–76 (.531)
- Divisional place: 2nd
- Owners: Marge Schott
- General managers: Bill Bergesch
- Managers: Pete Rose
- Television: WLWT (Marty Brennaman, Joe Nuxhall, Steve Physioc)
- Radio: WLW (Marty Brennaman, Joe Nuxhall)

The 1986 Cincinnati Reds season was the 117th season for the franchise in Major League Baseball, and their 17th and 16th full season at Riverfront Stadium. It consisted of the Cincinnati Reds attempting to win the National League West, although falling short in second place behind the Houston Astros.

Eric Davis hit 27 home runs and stole 80 bases this season. The New York Yankees' Rickey Henderson also had over 20 home runs and 80 steals in 1986, he and Davis are the only two major leaguers to accomplish this feat.

== Offseason ==
- December 19, 1985: Jay Tibbs, Andy McGaffigan, John Stuper, and Dann Bilardello were traded by the Reds to the Montreal Expos for Bill Gullickson and Sal Butera.
- January 16, 1986: Derek Botelho was signed as a free agent with the Cincinnati Reds.
- January 20, 1986: Tony Pérez was signed as a free agent by the Reds.

== Regular season ==
- On August 5, 1986, Steve Carlton struck out Eric Davis for the 4000th strikeout of his career.
- August 17, 1986: Pete Rose played in the last game of his career. It was a game against the San Diego Padres, and Rose was struck out by Goose Gossage.

=== Season standings ===
NL West
Team	W	L	Pct.	GB	Home	Road
Houston Astros	96	66	.593	—	52‍–‍29	44‍–‍37
Cincinnati Reds	86	76	.531	10	43‍–‍38	43‍–‍38
San Francisco Giants	83	79	.512	13	46‍–‍35	37‍–‍44
San Diego Padres	74	88	.457	22	43‍–‍38	31‍–‍50
Los Angeles Dodgers	73	89	.451	23	46‍–‍35	27‍–‍54
Atlanta Braves	72	89	.447	23½	41‍–‍40	31‍–‍49

=== Record vs. opponents ===
1986 National League record Sources:
Team	ATL	CHC	CIN	HOU	LAD	MON	NYM	PHI	PIT	SD	SF	STL
Atlanta	—	9–3	6–12	5–13	10–8	4–7	4–8	4–8	5–7	12–6	7–11	6–6
Chicago	3–9	—	5–7	4–8	6–6	8–10	6–12	9–8	7–11	6–6	6–6	10–7
Cincinnati	12–6	7–5	—	4–14	10–8	7–5	4–8	7–5	10–2	9–9	9–9	7–5
Houston	13–5	8–4	14–4	—	10–8	8–4	5–7	6–6	6–6	10–8	9–9	7–5
Los Angeles	8–10	6–6	8–10	8–10	—	5–7	3–9	5–7	8–4	6–12	8–10	8–4
Montreal	7–4	10–8	5–7	4–8	5–7	—	8–10	8–10	11–7	4–8	5–7	9–9
New York	8–4	12–6	8–4	7–5	9–3	10–8	—	8–10	17–1	10–2	7–5	12–6
Philadelphia	8-4	8–9	5–7	6–6	7–5	10–8	10–8	—	11–7	6–6	9–3	6–12
Pittsburgh	7–5	11–7	2–10	6–6	4–8	7–11	1–17	7–11	—	8–4	4–8	7–11
San Diego	6–12	6–6	9–9	8–10	12–6	8–4	2–10	6–6	4–8	—	8–10	5–7
San Francisco	11–7	6–6	9–9	9–9	10–8	7–5	5–7	3–9	8–4	10–8	—	5–7
St. Louis	6–6	7–10	5–7	5–7	4–8	9–9	6–12	12–6	11–7	7–5	7–5	—

=== Notable transactions ===
- March 31, 1986: Wayne Krenchicki was traded by the Reds to the Montreal Expos for Norm Charlton and a player to be named later. The Expos completed the deal by sending Tim Barker (minors) to the Reds on April 2.
- April 4, 1986: Chris Welsh was signed as a free agent with the Cincinnati Reds.

==== Draft picks ====
- June 2, 1986: Reggie Jefferson was drafted by the Reds in the 3rd round of the 1986 amateur draft.

=== Roster ===
1986 Cincinnati Reds roster
Roster
Pitchers: 32 Tom Browning; 40 John Denny; 31 John Franco; 34 Bill Gullickson; 43 Bill Landrum; 46 Rob Murphy; 48 Ted Power; 49 Joe Price; 33 Ron Robinson; 37 Mike Smith; 36 Mario Soto; 38 Scott Terry; 45 Chris Welsh; 42 Carl Willis	Catchers: 22 Sal Butera; 6 Bo Díaz; 23 Dave Van Gorder; Infielders: 25 Buddy Bell; 13 Dave Concepción; 12 Nick Esasky; 15 Barry Larkin; 16 Ron Oester; 24 Tony Pérez; 14 Pete Rose; 17 Wade Rowdon; 10 Tom Runnells; 11 Kurt Stillwell	Outfielders: 28 Kal Daniels; 44 Eric Davis; 29,57 Tracy Jones; 20 Eddie Milner; 39 Dave Parker; 9 Max Venable; Other batters: 21 Paul O'Neill	Manager: 14 Pete Rose; Coaches: 2 Scott Breeden; 7 Billy DeMars; 19 Tommy Helms; 4 Bruce Kimm; 3 George Scherger

== Player stats ==
=== Batting ===
==== Starters by position ====
Note: Pos = Position; G = Games played; AB = At bats; H = Hits; Avg. = Batting average; HR = Home runs; RBI = Runs batted in

Pos	Player	G	AB	H	Avg.	HR	RBI
C	Bo Diaz	134	474	129	.272	10	56
1B	Pete Rose	72	237	52	.219	0	25
2B	Ron Oester	153	523	135	.258	8	44
SS	Kurt Stillwell	104	279	64	.229	0	26
3B	Buddy Bell	155	568	158	.278	20	75
LF	Eric Davis	132	415	115	.277	27	71
CF	Eddie Milner	145	424	110	.259	15	47
RF	Dave Parker	162	637	174	.273	31	116

==== Other batters ====
Note: G = Games played; AB = At bats; H = Hits; Avg. = Batting average; HR = Home runs; RBI = Runs batted in

Player	G	AB	H	Avg.	HR	RBI
Nick Esasky	102	330	76	.230	12	41
Dave Concepción	90	311	81	.260	3	30
Tony Pérez	77	200	51	.255	2	29
Kal Daniels	74	181	58	.320	6	23
Barry Larkin	41	159	45	.283	3	19
Max Venable	108	147	31	.211	2	15
Sal Butera	56	113	27	.239	2	16
Tracy Jones	46	86	30	.349	2	10
Wade Rowdon	38	80	20	.250	0	10
Tom Runnells	12	11	1	.091	0	0
Dave Van Gorder	9	10	0	.000	0	0
Paul O'Neill	3	2	0	.000	0	0

=== Pitching ===
==== Starting pitchers ====
Note: G = Games pitched; IP = Innings pitched; W = Wins; L = Losses; ERA = Earned run average; SO = Strikeouts

Player	G	IP	W	L	ERA	SO
Bill Gullickson	37	244.2	15	12	3.38	121
Tom Browning	39	243.1	14	13	3.81	147
John Denny	27	171.1	11	10	4.20	115
Chris Welsh	24	139.1	6	9	4.78	40
Mario Soto	19	105.0	5	10	4.71	67

==== Other pitchers ====
Note: G = Games pitched; IP = Innings pitched; W = Wins; L = Losses; ERA = Earned run average; SO = Strikeouts

Player	G	IP	W	L	ERA	SO
Ted Power	56	129.0	10	6	3.70	95
Mike Smith	2	3.1	0	0	13.50	1

==== Relief pitchers ====
Note: G = Games; W = Wins; L = Losses; SV = Saves; ERA = Earned run average; SO = Strikeouts

Player	G	W	L	SV	ERA	SO
John Franco	74	6	6	29	2.94	84
Ron Robinson	70	10	3	14	3.24	117
Rob Murphy	34	6	0	1	0.72	36
Carl Willis	29	1	3	0	4.47	24
Scott Terry	28	1	2	0	6.14	32
Joe Price	25	1	2	0	5.40	30
Bill Landrum	10	0	0	0	6.75	14
Sal Butera	1	0	0	0	0.00	1

== Farm system ==
Level	Team	League	Manager
AAA	Denver Zephyrs	American Association	Jack Lind
AA	Vermont Reds	Eastern League	Jay Ward
A	Tampa Tarpons	Florida State League	Marc Bombard
A	Cedar Rapids Reds	Midwest League	Gene Dusan and Paul Kirsch
Rookie	GCL Reds	Gulf Coast League	Sam Mejías
Rookie	Billings Mustangs	Pioneer League	Jeff Cox

LEAGUE CHAMPIONS: Vermont
