= 1986 St. Louis Cardinals season =

Major League Baseball season

1986 St. Louis Cardinals
- League: National League
- Division: East
- Ballpark: Busch Memorial Stadium
- City: St. Louis, Missouri
- Record: 79–82 (.491)
- Divisional place: 3rd
- Owners: August "Gussie" Busch
- General managers: Dal Maxvill
- Managers: Whitey Herzog
- Television: KSDK (Jack Buck, Mike Shannon, Jay Randolph); Cardinal Cable Network (Al Hrabosky, Ken Wilson)
- Radio: KMOX (Jack Buck, Mike Shannon)

The 1986 St. Louis Cardinals season was the team's 105th season in St. Louis, Missouri and its 95th season in the National League. The Cardinals went 79–82 during the season and finished third in the National League East division.

== Offseason ==
- December 6, 1985: Gary Rajsich was purchased from the Cardinals by the Chunichi Dragons.
- December 10, 1985: Joaquín Andújar was traded by the Cardinals to the Oakland Athletics for Mike Heath and Tim Conroy.
- December 10, 1985: Clint Hurdle was drafted by the Cardinals from the New York Mets in the 1985 rule 5 draft.
- December 15, 1985: Jerry White was signed as a free agent by the Cardinals.
- January 13, 1986: Vic Rodriguez was signed as a free agent by the Cardinals.
- January 14, 1986: Bret Barberie was drafted by the Cardinals in the 2nd round of the 1986 Major League Baseball draft, but did not sign.
- March 21, 1986: Alan Knicely was signed as a free agent by the Cardinals.
- March 31, 1986: Tom Nieto was traded by the Cardinals to the Montreal Expos for Fred Manrique.

== Regular season ==
Pitcher Todd Worrell won the Rookie of the Year Award this year, with a 2.08 ERA and 36 saves. This was the second consecutive year a Cardinal won the Rookie of the Year Award, with Vince Coleman winning the previous season, and the second time in team history that the Cardinals had two consecutive NL Rookie of the Year winners (Wally Moon in 1954 and Bill Virdon in 1955). Shortstop Ozzie Smith and outfielder Willie McGee won Gold Gloves this year.

The Cardinals played 116 games (of 161) in which they failed to hit a home run, the most of any team since the 1952 Washington Senators.

=== Season standings ===
NL East
Team	W	L	Pct.	GB	Home	Road
New York Mets	108	54	.667	—	55‍–‍26	53‍–‍28
Philadelphia Phillies	86	75	.534	21½	49‍–‍31	37‍–‍44
St. Louis Cardinals	79	82	.491	28½	42‍–‍39	37‍–‍43
Montreal Expos	78	83	.484	29½	36‍–‍44	42‍–‍39
Chicago Cubs	70	90	.438	37	42‍–‍38	28‍–‍52
Pittsburgh Pirates	64	98	.395	44	31‍–‍50	33‍–‍48

=== Record vs. opponents ===
1986 National League record Sources:
Team	ATL	CHC	CIN	HOU	LAD	MON	NYM	PHI	PIT	SD	SF	STL
Atlanta	—	9–3	6–12	5–13	10–8	4–7	4–8	4–8	5–7	12–6	7–11	6–6
Chicago	3–9	—	5–7	4–8	6–6	8–10	6–12	9–8	7–11	6–6	6–6	10–7
Cincinnati	12–6	7–5	—	4–14	10–8	7–5	4–8	7–5	10–2	9–9	9–9	7–5
Houston	13–5	8–4	14–4	—	10–8	8–4	5–7	6–6	6–6	10–8	9–9	7–5
Los Angeles	8–10	6–6	8–10	8–10	—	5–7	3–9	5–7	8–4	6–12	8–10	8–4
Montreal	7–4	10–8	5–7	4–8	5–7	—	8–10	8–10	11–7	4–8	5–7	9–9
New York	8–4	12–6	8–4	7–5	9–3	10–8	—	8–10	17–1	10–2	7–5	12–6
Philadelphia	8-4	8–9	5–7	6–6	7–5	10–8	10–8	—	11–7	6–6	9–3	6–12
Pittsburgh	7–5	11–7	2–10	6–6	4–8	7–11	1–17	7–11	—	8–4	4–8	7–11
San Diego	6–12	6–6	9–9	8–10	12–6	8–4	2–10	6–6	4–8	—	8–10	5–7
San Francisco	11–7	6–6	9–9	9–9	10–8	7–5	5–7	3–9	8–4	10–8	—	5–7
St. Louis	6–6	7–10	5–7	5–7	4–8	9–9	6–12	12–6	11–7	7–5	7–5	—

=== Opening Day starters ===
- Jack Clark
- Vince Coleman
- Mike Heath
- Tom Herr
- Willie McGee
- Terry Pendleton
- Ozzie Smith
- John Tudor
- Andy Van Slyke

=== Notable transactions ===
- April 1, 1986: Brian Harper was released by the Cardinals.
- April 11, 1986: Ray Burris was signed as a free agent by the Cardinals.
- June 12, 1986: Jerry White was released by the Cardinals.
- July 19, 1986: César Cedeño was signed as a free agent by the Cardinals.
- July 24, 1986: Steve Lake was signed as a free agent by the Cardinals.
- August 10, 1986: Mike Heath was traded by the Cardinals to the Detroit Tigers for Ken Hill and a player to be named later. The Tigers completed the deal by sending Mike Laga to the Cardinals on September 2.
- August 27, 1986: Ray Burris was released by the St. Louis Cardinals.

=== Roster ===
1986 St. Louis Cardinals
Roster
Pitchers: 43 Greg Bargar; 36 Joe Boever; 35 Ray Burris; 39 Tim Conroy; 34 Danny Cox; 46 Ken Dayley; 41 Bill Earley; 31 Bob Forsch; 49 Ricky Horton; 50 Kurt Kepshire; 32 Jeff Lahti; 53 Greg Mathews; 40 Rick Ownbey; 37 Pat Perry; 47 Ray Soff; 30 John Tudor; 38 Todd Worrell	Catchers: 5 Mike Heath; 25 Steve Lake; 10 Mike LaValliere; Infielders: 22 Jack Clark; 28 Tom Herr; 13 Clint Hurdle; 23 Alan Knicely; 35 Mike Laga; 12 Tom Lawless; 15 Jim Lindeman; 5 Fred Manrique; 11 Jose Oquendo; 9 Terry Pendleton; 1 Ozzie Smith	Outfielders: 29 Vince Coleman; 27 Curt Ford; 21 Tito Landrum; 51 Willie McGee; 33 John Morris; 18 Andy Van Slyke; 25 Jerry White	Manager: 24 Whitey Herzog; Coaches: 7 Rich Hacker (First base); 8 Johnny Lewis (Hitting); 16 Nick Leyva (Third base); 3 Dave Ricketts (Bullpen); 4 Mike Roarke (Pitching); 2 Red Schoendienst (Bench)

== Player stats ==
=== Batting ===
==== Starters by position ====
Note: Pos = Position; G = Games played; AB = At bats; H = Hits; Avg. = Batting average; HR = Home runs; RBI = Runs batted in

Pos	Player	G	AB	H	Avg.	HR	RBI
C	Mike LaValliere	110	303	71	.234	3	30
1B	Jack Clark	65	232	55	.237	9	23
2B	Tom Herr	152	559	141	.252	2	61
SS	Ozzie Smith	153	514	144	.280	0	54
3B	Terry Pendleton	159	578	138	.239	1	59
LF	Vince Coleman	154	600	139	.232	0	29
CF	Willie McGee	124	497	127	.256	7	48
RF	Andy Van Slyke	137	418	113	.270	13	61

==== Other batters ====
Note: G = Games played; AB = At bats; H = Hits; Avg. = Batting average; HR = Home runs; RBI = Runs batted in

Player	G	AB	H	Avg.	HR	RBI
Curt Ford	85	214	53	.248	2	29
Tito Landrum	96	205	43	.210	2	17
Mike Heath	65	190	39	.205	4	25
Clint Hurdle	78	154	30	.195	3	15
José Oquendo	76	138	41	.297	0	13
John Morris	39	100	24	.240	1	14
Alan Knicely	34	82	16	.195	1	6
Jim Lindeman	19	55	14	.255	1	6
Steve Lake	26	49	12	.245	2	10
Mike Laga	18	46	10	.217	3	8
Tom Lawless	46	39	11	.282	0	3
Jerry White	25	24	3	.125	1	3
Fred Manrique	13	17	3	.176	1	1

=== Pitching ===
==== Starting pitchers ====
Note: G = Games pitched; IP = Innings pitched; W = Wins; L = Losses; ERA = Earned run average; SO = Strikeouts

Player	G	IP	W	L	ERA	SO
Bob Forsch	33	230.0	14	10	3.25	104
Danny Cox	32	220.0	12	13	2.90	108
John Tudor	30	219.0	13	7	2.92	107
Greg Mathews	23	145.1	11	8	3.65	67
Tim Conroy	25	115.1	5	11	5.23	79

==== Other pitchers ====
Note: G = Games pitched; IP = Innings pitched; W = Wins; L = Losses; ERA = Earned run average; SO = Strikeouts

Player	G	IP	W	L	ERA	SO
Ricky Horton	42	100.1	4	3	2.24	49
Ray Burris	23	82.0	4	5	5.60	34
Rick Ownbey	17	42.2	1	3	3.80	25
Kurt Kepshire	2	8.0	0	1	4.50	6

==== Relief pitchers ====
Note: G = Games pitched; W = Wins; L = Losses; SV = Saves; ERA = Earned run average; SO = Strikeouts

Player	G	W	L	SV	ERA	SO
Todd Worrell	74	9	10	36	2.08	73
Pat Perry	46	2	3	2	3.80	29
Ken Dayley	31	0	3	5	3.26	33
Ray Soff	30	4	2	0	3.29	22
Greg Bargar	22	0	2	0	5.60	12
Joe Boever	11	0	1	0	1.60	8
Jeff Lahti	4	0	0	0	0.00	3
Bill Earley	3	0	0	0	0.00	2

== Awards and honors ==
- Vince Coleman, National League Stolen Base Leader, 107
- Willie McGee, Outfield, National League Gold Glove
- Ozzie Smith, Shortstop, National League Gold Glove
- Todd Worrell, National League Rookie of the Year

== Farm system ==
Level	Team	League	Manager
AAA	Louisville Redbirds	American Association	Jim Fregosi and Dave Bialas
AA	Arkansas Travelers	Texas League	Jim Riggleman
A	St. Petersburg Cardinals	Florida State League	Dave Bialas, Marty Mason and Mike Jorgensen
A	Springfield Cardinals	Midwest League	Gaylen Pitts
A	Savannah Cardinals	South Atlantic League	Mark DeJohn
A-Short Season	Erie Cardinals	New York–Penn League	Joe Rigoli
Rookie	Johnson City Cardinals	Appalachian League	Dan Radison

LEAGUE CHAMPIONS: St. Petersburg
