= 1986 San Francisco Giants season =

1986 San Francisco Giants
- League: National League
- Division: West
- Ballpark: Candlestick Park
- City: San Francisco
- Record: 83–79 (.512)
- Divisional place: 3rd
- Owners: Bob Lurie
- General managers: Al Rosen
- Managers: Roger Craig
- Television: KTVU (Hank Greenwald, Gary Park); GiantsVision (Joe Morgan, Phil Stone, Duane Kuiper)
- Radio: KNBR (Hank Greenwald, Phil Stone); KIQI (Tito Fuentes, Edgard Martinez)

The 1986 San Francisco Giants season was the Giants' 104th season in Major League Baseball, their 29th season in San Francisco since their move from New York following the 1957 season, and their 27th at Candlestick Park. The team finished in third place in the National League West with an 83–79 record, 13 games behind the Houston Astros.

== Offseason ==
- October 24, 1985: George Riley and Alonzo Powell were traded by the Giants to the Montreal Expos for Bill Laskey.
- December 11, 1985: Manny Trillo was traded by the Giants to the Chicago Cubs for Dave Owen.
- December 17, 1985: Vida Blue was signed as a free agent by the Giants.
- December 18, 1985: Rob Deer was traded by the Giants to the Milwaukee Brewers for Dean Freeland (minors) and Eric Pilkington (minors).
- January 23, 1986: Fran Mullins was purchased from the Giants by the Cleveland Indians.
- February 3, 1986: Rick Waits was signed as a free agent by the Giants.
- March 26, 1986: Steve Stanicek was traded by the Giants to the Milwaukee Brewers for Rob DeWolf (minors).

== Regular season ==
- April 8, 1986: In his first major league at bat, Will Clark debuted with a home run— in his first at-bat and on his first swing off of future Hall of Fame member Nolan Ryan. Clark became the 11th player in history to hit a home run on his first swing in the Major Leagues.
- August 5, 1986: Steve Carlton struck out Eric Davis for the 4000th strikeout of his career.
- September 21, 1986: Robby Thompson went 5 for 5 in a game versus the Atlanta Braves.

On August 20, 1986, Phillies pitcher Don Carman took a perfect game into the ninth inning against the Giants at Candlestick Park. Giants catcher Bob Brenly hit a long drive into the gap in left-center field. Phillies center fielder Milt Thompson was positioned to make a running catch but the ball hit the base of his glove and was ruled a hit. Brenly was credited with a double. Carman lost the perfect game but the Phillies won in ten innings.

=== Opening Day starters ===
- Bob Brenly
- Chris Brown
- Will Clark
- Chili Davis
- Dan Gladden
- Mike Krukow
- Jeffrey Leonard
- Robby Thompson
- José Uribe

=== Season standings ===
NL West
| Team | W | L | Pct. | GB | Home | Road |
|---|---|---|---|---|---|---|
| Houston Astros | 96 | 66 | .593 | — | 52‍–‍29 | 44‍–‍37 |
| Cincinnati Reds | 86 | 76 | .531 | 10 | 43‍–‍38 | 43‍–‍38 |
| San Francisco Giants | 83 | 79 | .512 | 13 | 46‍–‍35 | 37‍–‍44 |
| San Diego Padres | 74 | 88 | .457 | 22 | 43‍–‍38 | 31‍–‍50 |
| Los Angeles Dodgers | 73 | 89 | .451 | 23 | 46‍–‍35 | 27‍–‍54 |
| Atlanta Braves | 72 | 89 | .447 | 23½ | 41‍–‍40 | 31‍–‍49 |

=== Record vs. opponents ===
1986 National League record Sources:
| Team | ATL | CHC | CIN | HOU | LAD | MON | NYM | PHI | PIT | SD | SF | STL |
|---|---|---|---|---|---|---|---|---|---|---|---|---|
| Atlanta | — | 9–3 | 6–12 | 5–13 | 10–8 | 4–7 | 4–8 | 4–8 | 5–7 | 12–6 | 7–11 | 6–6 |
| Chicago | 3–9 | — | 5–7 | 4–8 | 6–6 | 8–10 | 6–12 | 9–8 | 7–11 | 6–6 | 6–6 | 10–7 |
| Cincinnati | 12–6 | 7–5 | — | 4–14 | 10–8 | 7–5 | 4–8 | 7–5 | 10–2 | 9–9 | 9–9 | 7–5 |
| Houston | 13–5 | 8–4 | 14–4 | — | 10–8 | 8–4 | 5–7 | 6–6 | 6–6 | 10–8 | 9–9 | 7–5 |
| Los Angeles | 8–10 | 6–6 | 8–10 | 8–10 | — | 5–7 | 3–9 | 5–7 | 8–4 | 6–12 | 8–10 | 8–4 |
| Montreal | 7–4 | 10–8 | 5–7 | 4–8 | 5–7 | — | 8–10 | 8–10 | 11–7 | 4–8 | 5–7 | 9–9 |
| New York | 8–4 | 12–6 | 8–4 | 7–5 | 9–3 | 10–8 | — | 8–10 | 17–1 | 10–2 | 7–5 | 12–6 |
| Philadelphia | 8-4 | 8–9 | 5–7 | 6–6 | 7–5 | 10–8 | 10–8 | — | 11–7 | 6–6 | 9–3 | 6–12 |
| Pittsburgh | 7–5 | 11–7 | 2–10 | 6–6 | 4–8 | 7–11 | 1–17 | 7–11 | — | 8–4 | 4–8 | 7–11 |
| San Diego | 6–12 | 6–6 | 9–9 | 8–10 | 12–6 | 8–4 | 2–10 | 6–6 | 4–8 | — | 8–10 | 5–7 |
| San Francisco | 11–7 | 6–6 | 9–9 | 9–9 | 10–8 | 7–5 | 5–7 | 3–9 | 8–4 | 10–8 | — | 5–7 |
| St. Louis | 6–6 | 7–10 | 5–7 | 5–7 | 4–8 | 9–9 | 6–12 | 12–6 | 11–7 | 7–5 | 7–5 | — |

=== Notable transactions ===
- June 2, 1986: 1986 Major League Baseball draft
  - Matt Williams was drafted by the Giants in the 1st round (3rd pick).
  - Kirt Manwaring was drafted by the Giants in the 2nd round. Player signed June 4, 1986.
  - Jim Pena was drafted by the San Francisco Giants in the 16th round.
- July 4, 1986: Steve Carlton was signed as a free agent by the Giants.
- August 7, 1986: Steve Carlton was released by the Giants.

=== Major League debuts ===
- Batters:
  - Mike Aldrete (May 28)
  - Will Clark (Apr 8)
  - Randy Kutcher (Jun 19)
  - Phil Ouellette (Sep 10)
  - Robby Thompson (Apr 8)
- Pitchers:
  - Randy Bockus (Sep 10)
  - Kelly Downs (Jul 29)
  - Chuck Hensley (May 10)
  - Terry Mulholland (Jun 8)

=== Roster ===
1986 San Francisco Giants
Roster
| Pitchers: 40 Juan Berenguer; 14 Vida Blue; 26 Randy Bockus; 32 Steve Carlton; 13 Mark Davis; 37 Kelly Downs; 50 Scott Garrelts; 51 Jim Gott; 46 Mark Grant; 26 Chuck Hensley; 39 Mike Krukow; 29 Mike LaCoss; 19 Bill Laskey; 48 Roger Mason; 38 Greg Minton; 45 Terry Mulholland; 49 Jeff Robinson; 47 Frank Williams | Catchers: 15 Bob Brenly; 17 Brad Gulden; 7 Bob Melvin; 12 Phil Ouellette; Infielders: 1 Mike Aldrete; 35 Chris Brown; 22 Will Clark; 25 Dan Driessen; 9,31 Rick Lancellotti; 2 Luis Quiñones; 16 Harry Spilman; 6 Robby Thompson; 23 José Uribe; 36 Brad Wellman; 41 Mike Woodard | Outfielders: 30 Chili Davis; 10,32 Dan Gladden; 9 Randy Kutcher; 20 Jeffrey Leonard; 21 Candy Maldonado; 8 Joel Youngblood; Other batters: 12 Chris Jones | Manager: 33 Roger Craig; Coaches: 42 Bill Fahey; 5 Bob Lillis; 8 Gordon Mackenzie; 28 Jose Morales (Hitting); 34 Norm Sherry (Pitching) |

== Player stats ==
=== Batting ===
==== Starters by position ====
Note: Pos = Position; G = Games played; AB = At bats; H = Hits; Avg. = Batting average; HR = Home runs; RBI = Runs batted in

| Pos | Player | G | AB | H | Avg. | HR | RBI |
|---|---|---|---|---|---|---|---|
| C | Bob Brenly | 149 | 472 | 116 | .246 | 16 | 62 |
| 1B | Will Clark | 111 | 408 | 117 | .287 | 11 | 41 |
| 2B | Robby Thompson | 149 | 549 | 149 | .271 | 7 | 47 |
| 3B | Chris Brown | 116 | 416 | 132 | .317 | 7 | 49 |
| SS | José Uribe | 157 | 453 | 101 | .223 | 3 | 43 |
| LF | Jeffrey Leonard | 89 | 341 | 95 | .279 | 6 | 42 |
| CF | Dan Gladden | 102 | 351 | 97 | .276 | 4 | 29 |
| RF | Chili Davis | 153 | 526 | 146 | .278 | 13 | 70 |

==== Other batters ====
Note: G = Games played; AB = At bats; H = Hits; Avg. = Batting average; HR = Home runs; RBI = Runs batted in

| Player | G | AB | H | Avg. | HR | RBI |
|---|---|---|---|---|---|---|
| Candy Maldonado | 133 | 405 | 102 | .252 | 18 | 85 |
| Bob Melvin | 89 | 268 | 60 | .224 | 5 | 25 |
| Mike Aldrete | 84 | 216 | 54 | .250 | 2 | 25 |
| Randy Kutcher | 71 | 186 | 44 | .237 | 7 | 16 |
| Joel Youngblood | 97 | 184 | 47 | .255 | 5 | 28 |
| Luis Quiñones | 71 | 106 | 19 | .179 | 0 | 11 |
| Harry Spilman | 58 | 94 | 27 | .287 | 2 | 22 |
| Mike Woodard | 48 | 79 | 20 | .253 | 1 | 5 |
| Phil Ouellette | 10 | 23 | 4 | .174 | 0 | 0 |
| Brad Gulden | 17 | 22 | 2 | .091 | 0 | 1 |
| Rick Lancellotti | 15 | 18 | 4 | .222 | 2 | 6 |
| Dan Driessen | 15 | 16 | 3 | .188 | 0 | 0 |
| Brad Wellman | 12 | 13 | 2 | .154 | 0 | 1 |
| Chris Jones | 3 | 1 | 0 | .000 | 0 | 0 |

=== Pitching ===
==== Starting pitchers ====
Note: G = Games pitched; IP = Innings pitched; W = Wins; L = Losses; ERA = Earned run average; SO = Strikeouts

| Player | G | IP | W | L | ERA | SO |
|---|---|---|---|---|---|---|
| Mike Krukow | 34 | 245.0 | 20 | 9 | 3.05 | 178 |
| Mike LaCoss | 37 | 204.1 | 10 | 13 | 3.57 | 86 |
| Vida Blue | 28 | 156.2 | 10 | 10 | 3.27 | 100 |
| Kelly Downs | 14 | 88.1 | 4 | 4 | 2.75 | 64 |
| Roger Mason | 11 | 60.0 | 3 | 4 | 4.80 | 43 |
| Steve Carlton | 6 | 30.0 | 1 | 3 | 5.10 | 18 |

==== Other pitchers ====
Note: G = Games pitched; IP = Innings pitched; W = Wins; L = Losses; ERA = Earned run average; SO = Strikeouts

| Player | G | IP | W | L | ERA | SO |
|---|---|---|---|---|---|---|
| Scott Garrelts | 53 | 173.2 | 13 | 9 | 3.11 | 125 |
| Terry Mulholland | 15 | 54.2 | 1 | 7 | 4.94 | 27 |
| Jim Gott | 9 | 13.0 | 0 | 0 | 7.62 | 9 |
| Mark Grant | 4 | 10.0 | 0 | 1 | 3.60 | 5 |

==== Relief pitchers ====
Note: G = Games pitched; W = Wins; L = Losses; SV = Saves; ERA = Earned run average; SO = Strikeouts

| Player | G | W | L | SV | ERA | SO |
|---|---|---|---|---|---|---|
| Jeff Robinson | 64 | 6 | 3 | 8 | 3.36 | 90 |
| Mark Davis | 67 | 5 | 7 | 4 | 2.99 | 90 |
| Greg Minton | 48 | 4 | 4 | 5 | 3.93 | 34 |
| Frank Williams | 36 | 3 | 1 | 1 | 1.20 | 33 |
| Bill Laskey | 20 | 1 | 1 | 1 | 4.28 | 8 |
| Chuck Hensley | 11 | 0 | 0 | 1 | 2.45 | 6 |
| Randy Bockus | 5 | 0 | 0 | 0 | 2.57 | 4 |

== Awards and honors ==
- Mike Krukow, P, Willie Mac Award
- Candy Maldonado – Led National League in Pinch Hitting (.425 Batting average, 17 for 40, 4 Home Runs, 20 RBI)

All-Star Game

- Chris Brown, outfield, reserve

== Farm system ==
| Level | Team | League | Manager |
|---|---|---|---|
| AAA | Phoenix Firebirds | Pacific Coast League | Jim Lefebvre |
| AA | Shreveport Captains | Texas League | Wendell Kim |
| A | Fresno Giants | California League | Tim Blackwell |
| A | Clinton Giants | Midwest League | Jack Mull |
| A-Short Season | Everett Giants | Northwest League | Joe Strain |
