= 1986 Chicago Cubs season =

1986 Chicago Cubs
- League: National League
- Division: East
- Ballpark: Wrigley Field
- City: Chicago
- Record: 70–90 (.438)
- Divisional place: 5th
- Owners: Tribune Company
- General managers: Dallas Green
- Managers: Jim Frey, John Vukovich, Gene Michael
- Television: WGN-TV/Superstation WGN (Harry Caray, Steve Stone, Dewayne Staats)
- Radio: WGN (Dewayne Staats, Vince Lloyd, Lou Boudreau, Harry Caray)
- Stats: ESPN.com; Baseball Reference

The 1986 Chicago Cubs season was the 115th season of the Chicago Cubs franchise, the 111th in the National League and the 71st at Wrigley Field. The Cubs finished fifth in the National League East with a record of 70–90.

== Offseason ==
- November 9, 1985: Ced Landrum was signed as an amateur free agent by the Cubs.
- December 11, 1985: Dave Owen was traded by the Cubs to the San Francisco Giants for Manny Trillo.
- December 20, 1985: Derek Botelho was released by the Chicago Cubs.
- January 13, 1986: Larry Whitford (minors) and Rich Rembielak (minors) were traded by the Cubs to the Milwaukee Brewers for Mike Martin.
- January 14, 1986: Jerome Walton was drafted by the Cubs in the 2nd round of the 1986 Major League Baseball draft. Player signed May 12, 1986.
- January 15, 1986: Steve Christmas was signed as a free agent by the Cubs.
- January 17, 1986: Gary Jones (minors) and John Cox (minors) were traded by the Cubs to the Oakland Athletics for Phil Stephenson and Bob Bathe (minors).
- February 1, 1986: Matt Keough was signed as a free agent by the Cubs.

== Regular season ==
=== Season standings ===
NL East
Team	W	L	Pct.	GB	Home	Road
New York Mets	108	54	.667	—	55‍–‍26	53‍–‍28
Philadelphia Phillies	86	75	.534	21½	49‍–‍31	37‍–‍44
St. Louis Cardinals	79	82	.491	28½	42‍–‍39	37‍–‍43
Montreal Expos	78	83	.484	29½	36‍–‍44	42‍–‍39
Chicago Cubs	70	90	.438	37	42‍–‍38	28‍–‍52
Pittsburgh Pirates	64	98	.395	44	31‍–‍50	33‍–‍48

=== Record vs. opponents ===
1986 National League record Sources:
Team	ATL	CHC	CIN	HOU	LAD	MON	NYM	PHI	PIT	SD	SF	STL
Atlanta	—	9–3	6–12	5–13	10–8	4–7	4–8	4–8	5–7	12–6	7–11	6–6
Chicago	3–9	—	5–7	4–8	6–6	8–10	6–12	9–8	7–11	6–6	6–6	10–7
Cincinnati	12–6	7–5	—	4–14	10–8	7–5	4–8	7–5	10–2	9–9	9–9	7–5
Houston	13–5	8–4	14–4	—	10–8	8–4	5–7	6–6	6–6	10–8	9–9	7–5
Los Angeles	8–10	6–6	8–10	8–10	—	5–7	3–9	5–7	8–4	6–12	8–10	8–4
Montreal	7–4	10–8	5–7	4–8	5–7	—	8–10	8–10	11–7	4–8	5–7	9–9
New York	8–4	12–6	8–4	7–5	9–3	10–8	—	8–10	17–1	10–2	7–5	12–6
Philadelphia	8-4	8–9	5–7	6–6	7–5	10–8	10–8	—	11–7	6–6	9–3	6–12
Pittsburgh	7–5	11–7	2–10	6–6	4–8	7–11	1–17	7–11	—	8–4	4–8	7–11
San Diego	6–12	6–6	9–9	8–10	12–6	8–4	2–10	6–6	4–8	—	8–10	5–7
San Francisco	11–7	6–6	9–9	9–9	10–8	7–5	5–7	3–9	8–4	10–8	—	5–7
St. Louis	6–6	7–10	5–7	5–7	4–8	9–9	6–12	12–6	11–7	7–5	7–5	—

=== Opening Day starters ===
- Jody Davis
- Brian Dayett
- Bob Dernier
- Shawon Dunston
- Leon Durham
- Keith Moreland
- Ryne Sandberg
- Rick Sutcliffe
- Manny Trillo

=== Notable transactions ===
- May 2, 1986: Terry Francona was signed as a free agent by the Cubs.
- June 14, 1986: Matt Keough was released by the Cubs.
- July 15, 1986: Steve Lake was released by the Cubs.

== Roster ==
1986 Chicago Cubs
Roster
Pitchers: 48 Jay Baller; 39 Ron Davis; 33 Frank DiPino; 43 Dennis Eckersley; 31 Ray Fontenot; 39 George Frazier; 45 Dave Gumpert; 44 Drew Hall; 50 Guy Hoffman; 33 Matt Keough; 37 Ed Lynch; 31 Greg Maddux; 49 Jamie Moyer; 44 Dick Ruthven; 21 Scott Sanderson; 46 Lee Smith; 40 Rick Sutcliffe; 34 Steve Trout	Catchers: 18 Steve Christmas; 7 Jody Davis; 16,29 Steve Lake; 41 Mike Martin; Infielders: 11 Ron Cey; 12 Shawon Dunston; 10 Leon Durham; 15 Davey Lopes; 23 Ryne Sandberg; 28 Chris Speier; 19 Manny Trillo	Outfielders: 27 Thad Bosley; 24 Brian Dayett; 20 Bob Dernier; 16 Terry Francona; 1 Dave Martinez; 36 Gary Matthews; 6 Keith Moreland; 22 Jerry Mumphrey; 15 Rafael Palmeiro; 29 Chico Walker	Manager: 8 Jim Frey; 4 Gene Michael; 2 John Vukovich; Coaches: 5 Rubén Amaro; 3 Billy Connors; 9 Johnny Oates; 2 John Vukovich; 4 Don Zimmer

== Player stats ==
=== Batting ===
==== Starters by position ====
Note: Pos = Position; G = Games played; AB = At bats; H = Hits; Avg. = Batting average; HR = Home runs; RBI = Runs batted in

Pos	Player	G	AB	H	Avg.	HR	RBI
C	Jody Davis	148	528	132	.250	21	74
1B	Leon Durham	141	484	127	.262	20	65
2B	Ryne Sandberg	154	627	178	.284	14	76
SS	Shawon Dunston	150	581	145	.250	17	68
3B	Ron Cey	97	256	70	.273	13	36
LF	Gary Matthews	123	370	96	.259	21	46
CF	Bob Dernier	108	324	73	.225	4	18
RF	Keith Moreland	156	586	159	.271	12	79

==== Other batters ====
Note: G = Games played; AB = At bats; H = Hits; Avg. = Batting average; HR = Home runs; RBI = Runs batted in

Player	G	AB	H	Avg.	HR	RBI
Jerry Mumphrey	111	309	94	.304	5	32
Davey Lopes	59	157	47	.299	6	22
Chris Speier	95	155	44	.284	6	23
Manny Trillo	81	152	45	.296	1	19
Terry Francona	86	124	31	.250	2	8
Thad Bosley	87	120	33	.275	1	9
Dave Martinez	53	108	15	.139	1	7
Chico Walker	28	101	28	.277	1	7
Rafael Palmeiro	22	73	18	.247	3	12
Brian Dayett	24	67	18	.269	4	11
Steve Lake	10	19	8	.421	0	4
Mike Martin	8	13	1	.077	0	0
Steve Christmas	3	9	1	.111	0	2

=== Pitching ===
==== Starting pitchers ====
Note: G = Games pitched; IP = Innings pitched; W = Wins; L = Losses; ERA = Earned run average; SO = Strikeouts

Player	G	IP	W	L	ERA	SO
Dennis Eckersley	33	201.0	6	11	4.57	137
Rick Sutcliffe	28	176.2	5	14	4.64	122
Scott Sanderson	37	169.2	9	11	4.19	124
Steve Trout	37	161.0	5	7	4.75	69
Jamie Moyer	16	87.1	7	4	5.05	45
Greg Maddux	6	31.0	2	4	5.52	20
Drew Hall	5	23.2	1	2	4.56	21

==== Other pitchers ====
Note: G = Games pitched; IP = Innings pitched; W = Wins; L = Losses; ERA = Earned run average; SO = Strikeouts

Player	G	IP	W	L	ERA	SO
Ed Lynch	23	99.2	7	5	3.79	57
Guy Hoffman	32	84.0	6	2	3.86	47

==== Relief pitchers ====
Note: G = Games pitched; W = Wins; L = Losses; SV = Saves; ERA = Earned run average; SO = Strikeouts

Player	G	W	L	SV	ERA	SO
Lee Smith	66	9	9	31	3.09	93
Ray Fontenot	42	3	5	2	3.86	24
Dave Gumpert	38	2	0	2	4.37	45
Jay Baller	36	2	4	5	5.37	42
George Frazier	35	2	4	0	5.40	41
Frank DiPino	30	2	4	0	5.18	43
Matt Keough	19	2	2	0	4.97	19
Ron Davis	17	0	2	0	7.65	10
Dick Ruthven	6	0	0	0	5.06	3

== Farm system ==
Level	Team	League	Manager
AAA	Iowa Cubs	American Association	Larry Cox
AA	Pittsfield Cubs	Eastern League	Tom Spencer
A	Winston-Salem Spirits	Carolina League	Jim Essian
A	Peoria Chiefs	Midwest League	Pete Mackanin
A-Short Season	Geneva Cubs	New York–Penn League	Jay Loviglio
Rookie	Wytheville Cubs	Appalachian League	Tony Franklin

LEAGUE CHAMPIONS: Winston-Salem
