= Sal Butera =

American baseball player and coach (born 1952)

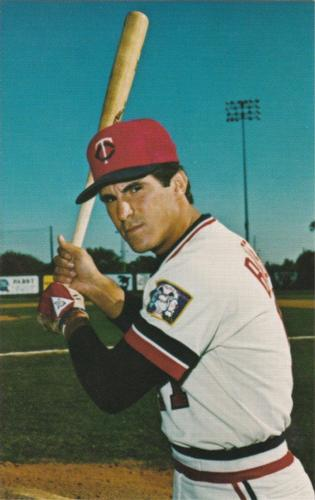
- Catcher
- Born: September 25, 1952 (age 74); Richmond Hill, Queens, New York, U.S.
- Batted: Right Threw: Right

MLB debut
- April 10, 1980, for the Minnesota Twins

Last MLB appearance
- September 26, 1988, for the Toronto Blue Jays

MLB statistics
- Batting average: .227
- Home runs: 8
- Runs batted in: 76
- Stats at Baseball Reference

Teams
- Minnesota Twins (1980–1982); Detroit Tigers (1983); Montreal Expos (1984–1985); Cincinnati Reds (1986–1987); Minnesota Twins (1987); Toronto Blue Jays (1988)

Career highlights and awards
- World Series champion (1987)

Salvatore Philip Butera (born September 25, 1952) is an American former professional baseball catcher. He played in Major League Baseball (MLB) from 1980 to 1988, for five different teams. He was a major-league scout for the Toronto Blue Jays during the 2015 season.

== Baseball career ==
Signed by the Minnesota Twins as an amateur free agent in 1972, Butera made his major league debut in an extra innings game against the Oakland Athletics on April 10, 1980. He struck out in his only at bat.

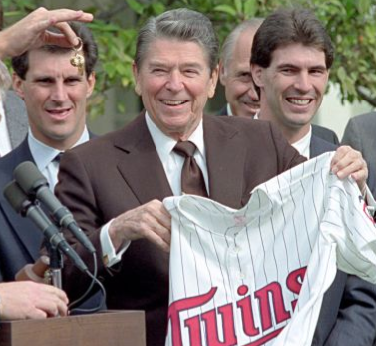
Butera, Ronald Reagan and Steve Lombardozzi (from left) in 1987

Butera remained with the Twins as Butch Wynegar's back-up until Spring training 1983 when he was dealt to the Detroit Tigers. Injuries limited Butera to only four games with the Tigers, with most of his season being spent with their Triple-A affiliate, the Evansville Triplets. He was released at the end of the season.

Butera spent the 1984 season with the Montreal Expos triple A American Association affiliate, the Indianapolis Indians, and appeared in three games for the Expos following a September call-up. After the 1985 season, he was dealt to the Cincinnati Reds with Bill Gullickson for Dann Bilardello, Andy McGaffigan, John Stuper and Jay Tibbs. He was released by Cincinnati during the 1987 season, and was immediately re-signed by his original franchise, the Minnesota Twins. Butera was a member of the Twins team that defeated the St. Louis Cardinals in the 1987 World Series. He was released, re-signed, and released again by the Twins during the 1987–1988 offseason, then was signed by the Toronto Blue Jays, where he played in 23 more games.

Following his playing career, Butera was the video replay and catching coach for the Blue Jays during the 2014 season. He became a major league scout for the 2015 season.

== Personal ==
Butera and his wife have a son, Drew, who also played for Minnesota during his major-league career, and later became a member of the Los Angeles Angels', Chicago White Sox's and Toronto Blue Jays' coaching staffs.

Butera was inducted into the Suffolk Sports Hall of Fame on Long Island in the Baseball Category with the Class of 2002.

Butera is Catholic and has said he relates especially to Thomas the Apostle.
