= 1986 Atlanta Braves season =

1986 Atlanta Braves
- League: National League
- Division: West
- Ballpark: Atlanta–Fulton County Stadium
- City: Atlanta
- Record: 72–89 (.447)
- Divisional place: 6th
- Owners: Ted Turner
- General managers: Bobby Cox
- Managers: Chuck Tanner
- Television: WTBS; Superstation WTBS
- Radio: WSB (Ernie Johnson, Pete Van Wieren, Skip Caray, John Sterling)

The 1986 Atlanta Braves season was the 116th in franchise history and their 21st in Atlanta.

== Offseason ==
- November 13, 1985: Randy Johnson was released by the Braves.
- December 6, 1985: Miguel Sosa (minors) was traded by the Braves to the New York Yankees for Billy Sample.
- March 5, 1986: Rick Cerone, David Clay (minors), and Flavio Alfaro (minors) were traded by the Braves to the Milwaukee Brewers for Ted Simmons.

== Regular season ==
The Braves shutout the Montreal Expos, 6–0 in their season opener, but were 7–12 at the end of April, 6 1/2 games out of first. Atlanta won 17 of their first 25 games in the month of May, improving their record to 24–20 May 27. They were tied for second and were 1 1/2 games out of first.

On June 24 the Braves dropped into fourth place with a 34–36 record. They were in fourth place, 4 1/2 games out of first. Atlanta won seven of their next eight games to surge back into contention on July 3. Atlanta was 41–37 and in third place, 1 1/2 games out of first. The Braves promptly lost 20 of their next 25 games and fell into the cellar, 46–57, 12 1/2 games out of first. After a 12–5 run put them within 10 1/2 games of the lead, the Braves fizzled and faded down the stretch, losing their last five games to finish in last place with a 72–89 record, 23 1/2 games out of first.

The strong play of the Braves in the first half of the season was partly attributed to "The Bomb Squad", a group of six veterans who provided clutch hitting of the bench. The members of "The Bomb Squad" were: Ted Simmons, Chris Chambliss, Omar Moreno, Billy Sample, Bruce Benedict, and Andres Thomas. The name for the group was coined during spring training by Simmons in an effort to create unity among the bench players (Simmons, Moreno, and Sample were in their first season with the Braves).

- July 6, 1986: In an 11-8 loss to the Montreal Expos, Bob Horner hit four home runs in one game. Horner became the second player in the 20th century (Gil Hodges was the first in 1950) to hit four home runs in one game in his home park. He became the first player since Ed Delahanty to hit four home runs in a losing game.

=== Season standings ===
NL West
Team	W	L	Pct.	GB	Home	Road
Houston Astros	96	66	.593	—	52‍–‍29	44‍–‍37
Cincinnati Reds	86	76	.531	10	43‍–‍38	43‍–‍38
San Francisco Giants	83	79	.512	13	46‍–‍35	37‍–‍44
San Diego Padres	74	88	.457	22	43‍–‍38	31‍–‍50
Los Angeles Dodgers	73	89	.451	23	46‍–‍35	27‍–‍54
Atlanta Braves	72	89	.447	23½	41‍–‍40	31‍–‍49

=== Record vs. opponents ===
1986 National League record Sources:
Team	ATL	CHC	CIN	HOU	LAD	MON	NYM	PHI	PIT	SD	SF	STL
Atlanta	—	9–3	6–12	5–13	10–8	4–7	4–8	4–8	5–7	12–6	7–11	6–6
Chicago	3–9	—	5–7	4–8	6–6	8–10	6–12	9–8	7–11	6–6	6–6	10–7
Cincinnati	12–6	7–5	—	4–14	10–8	7–5	4–8	7–5	10–2	9–9	9–9	7–5
Houston	13–5	8–4	14–4	—	10–8	8–4	5–7	6–6	6–6	10–8	9–9	7–5
Los Angeles	8–10	6–6	8–10	8–10	—	5–7	3–9	5–7	8–4	6–12	8–10	8–4
Montreal	7–4	10–8	5–7	4–8	5–7	—	8–10	8–10	11–7	4–8	5–7	9–9
New York	8–4	12–6	8–4	7–5	9–3	10–8	—	8–10	17–1	10–2	7–5	12–6
Philadelphia	8-4	8–9	5–7	6–6	7–5	10–8	10–8	—	11–7	6–6	9–3	6–12
Pittsburgh	7–5	11–7	2–10	6–6	4–8	7–11	1–17	7–11	—	8–4	4–8	7–11
San Diego	6–12	6–6	9–9	8–10	12–6	8–4	2–10	6–6	4–8	—	8–10	5–7
San Francisco	11–7	6–6	9–9	9–9	10–8	7–5	5–7	3–9	8–4	10–8	—	5–7
St. Louis	6–6	7–10	5–7	5–7	4–8	9–9	6–12	12–6	11–7	7–5	7–5	—

=== Notable transactions ===
- April 1, 1986: Pascual Pérez was released by the Braves.
- June 2, 1986: Ben McDonald was drafted by the Braves in the 27th round of the 1986 Major League Baseball draft, but did not sign.
- June 30, 1986: Claudell Washington and Paul Zuvella were traded by the Braves to the New York Yankees for Ken Griffey, Sr. and Andre Robertson.
- July 6, 1986: Duane Ward was traded by the Braves to the Toronto Blue Jays for Doyle Alexander.

=== Roster ===
1986 Atlanta Braves
Roster
Pitchers: 38 Jim Acker; 37 Doyle Alexander; 30 Paul Assenmacher; 49 Jeff Dedmon; 26 Gene Garber; 38 Joe Johnson; 42 Rick Mahler; 29 Craig McMurtry; 31 Ed Olwine; 46 David Palmer; 45 Charlie Puleo; 43 Steve Shields; 34 Zane Smith; 39 Cliff Speck; 40 Bruce Sutter; 48 Duane Ward	Catchers: 20 Bruce Benedict; 9 Ozzie Virgil; Infielders: 10 Chris Chambliss; 11 Bob Horner; 17 Glenn Hubbard; 36 Brad Komminsk; 24 Ken Oberkfell; 16 Rafael Ramírez; 12 Paul Runge; 23 Ted Simmons; 14 Andrés Thomas	Outfielders: 22 Ken Griffey; 1 Albert Hall; 19 Terry Harper; 18 Omar Moreno; 6 Darryl Motley; 3 Dale Murphy; 28 Gerald Perry; 5,6 Billy Sample; 15 Claudell Washington	Manager: 7 Chuck Tanner; Coaches: 50 Tony Bartirome; 52 Alex Monchak; 53 Russ Nixon; 33 Johnny Sain; 48 Bob Skinner; 8 Willie Stargell

== Player stats ==
=== Batting ===
==== Starters by position ====
Note: Pos = Position; G = Games played; AB = At bats; H = Hits; Avg. = Batting average; HR = Home runs; RBI = Runs batted in

Pos	Player	G	AB	H	Avg.	HR	RBI
C	Ozzie Virgil	114	359	80	.223	15	48
1B	Bob Horner	141	517	141	.273	27	87
2B	Glenn Hubbard	143	408	94	.230	4	36
3B	Ken Oberkfell	151	503	136	.270	5	48
SS	Andrés Thomas	102	323	81	.251	6	32
LF	Ken Griffey	80	292	90	.308	12	32
CF	Dale Murphy	160	614	163	.265	29	83
RF	Omar Moreno	118	359	84	.234	4	27

==== Other batters ====
Note: G = Games played; AB = At bats; H = Hits; Avg. = Batting average; HR = Home runs; RBI = Runs batted in

Player	G	AB	H	Avg.	HR	RBI
Rafael Ramírez	134	496	119	.240	8	33
Terry Harper	106	265	68	.257	8	30
Billy Sample	92	200	57	.285	6	14
Bruce Benedict	64	160	36	.225	0	13
Claudell Washington	40	137	37	.270	5	14
Ted Simmons	76	127	32	.252	4	25
Chris Chambliss	97	122	38	.311	2	14
Gerald Perry	29	70	19	.271	2	11
Albert Hall	16	50	12	.240	0	1
Darryl Motley	5	10	2	.200	0	0
Paul Runge	7	8	2	.250	0	0
Brad Komminsk	5	5	2	.400	0	1

=== Pitching ===
==== Starting pitchers ====
Note: G = Games pitched; IP = Innings pitched; W = Wins; L = Losses; ERA = Earned run average; SO = Strikeouts

Player	G	IP	W	L	ERA	SO
Rick Mahler	39	237.2	14	18	4.88	137
David Palmer	35	209.2	11	10	3.65	170
Zane Smith	38	204.2	8	16	4.05	139
Doyle Alexander	17	117.1	6	6	3.84	74
Joe Johnson	17	87.0	6	7	4.97	49

==== Other pitchers ====
Note: G = Games pitched; IP = Innings pitched; W = Wins; L = Losses; ERA = Earned run average; SO = Strikeouts

Player	G	IP	W	L	ERA	SO
Jim Acker	21	95.0	3	8	3.79	37
Craig McMurtry	37	79.2	1	6	4.74	50
Charlie Puleo	5	24.1	1	2	2.96	18

==== Relief pitchers ====
Note: G = Games pitched; W = Wins; L = Losses; SV = Saves; ERA = Earned run average; SO = Strikeouts

Player	G	W	L	SV	ERA	SO
Gene Garber	61	5	5	24	2.54	56
Paul Assenmacher	61	7	3	7	2.50	56
Jeff Dedmon	57	6	6	3	2.98	58
Ed Olwine	37	0	0	1	3.40	37
Bruce Sutter	16	2	0	3	4.34	16
Cliff Speck	13	2	1	0	4.13	21
Duane Ward	10	0	1	0	7.31	8
Steve Shields	6	0	0	0	7.11	6

== Farm system ==
Level	Team	League	Manager
AAA	Richmond Braves	International League	Roy Majtyka
AA	Greenville Braves	Southern League	Jim Beauchamp
A	Durham Bulls	Carolina League	Buddy Bailey
A	Sumter Braves	South Atlantic League	Brian Snitker
Rookie	Pulaski Braves	Appalachian League	Grady Little
Rookie	GCL Braves	Gulf Coast League	Pedro González
Rookie	Idaho Falls Braves	Pioneer League	Rod Gilbreath

LEAGUE CHAMPIONS: Richmond, Pulaski
