= 1986 San Diego Padres season =

1986 San Diego Padres
- League: National League
- Division: West
- Ballpark: Jack Murphy Stadium
- City: San Diego, California
- Record: 74–88 (.457)
- Divisional place: 4th
- Owners: Joan Kroc
- Managers: Steve Boros
- Television: KCST; San Diego Cable Sports Network (Dave Campbell, Jerry Coleman, Bob Chandler, Ted Leitner)
- Radio: KFMB (AM) (Dave Campbell, Jerry Coleman); XEXX (Gustavo Lopez, Mario Thomas Zapiain)

The 1986 San Diego Padres season was the 18th season in franchise history.

== Offseason ==
- January 28, 1986: Dane Iorg was signed as a free agent by the Padres.
- March 25, 1986: Mario Ramírez was released by the Padres.

== Regular season ==
- August 17, 1986: Pete Rose played in the last game of his career. It was a game against the San Diego Padres, and Rose was struck out by Goose Gossage.
- September 20, 1986: Tony Gwynn became the 5th player since 1900 to steal 5 bases in one game. He accomplished the feat against the Houston Astros.

=== Opening Day starters ===
- Tim Flannery
- Steve Garvey
- Tony Gwynn
- Terry Kennedy
- Carmelo Martínez
- Kevin McReynolds
- Graig Nettles
- Eric Show
- Garry Templeton

=== Season standings ===
NL West
Team	W	L	Pct.	GB	Home	Road
Houston Astros	96	66	.593	—	52‍–‍29	44‍–‍37
Cincinnati Reds	86	76	.531	10	43‍–‍38	43‍–‍38
San Francisco Giants	83	79	.512	13	46‍–‍35	37‍–‍44
San Diego Padres	74	88	.457	22	43‍–‍38	31‍–‍50
Los Angeles Dodgers	73	89	.451	23	46‍–‍35	27‍–‍54
Atlanta Braves	72	89	.447	23½	41‍–‍40	31‍–‍49

=== Record vs. opponents ===
1986 National League record Sources:
Team	ATL	CHC	CIN	HOU	LAD	MON	NYM	PHI	PIT	SD	SF	STL
Atlanta	—	9–3	6–12	5–13	10–8	4–7	4–8	4–8	5–7	12–6	7–11	6–6
Chicago	3–9	—	5–7	4–8	6–6	8–10	6–12	9–8	7–11	6–6	6–6	10–7
Cincinnati	12–6	7–5	—	4–14	10–8	7–5	4–8	7–5	10–2	9–9	9–9	7–5
Houston	13–5	8–4	14–4	—	10–8	8–4	5–7	6–6	6–6	10–8	9–9	7–5
Los Angeles	8–10	6–6	8–10	8–10	—	5–7	3–9	5–7	8–4	6–12	8–10	8–4
Montreal	7–4	10–8	5–7	4–8	5–7	—	8–10	8–10	11–7	4–8	5–7	9–9
New York	8–4	12–6	8–4	7–5	9–3	10–8	—	8–10	17–1	10–2	7–5	12–6
Philadelphia	8-4	8–9	5–7	6–6	7–5	10–8	10–8	—	11–7	6–6	9–3	6–12
Pittsburgh	7–5	11–7	2–10	6–6	4–8	7–11	1–17	7–11	—	8–4	4–8	7–11
San Diego	6–12	6–6	9–9	8–10	12–6	8–4	2–10	6–6	4–8	—	8–10	5–7
San Francisco	11–7	6–6	9–9	9–9	10–8	7–5	5–7	3–9	8–4	10–8	—	5–7
St. Louis	6–6	7–10	5–7	5–7	4–8	9–9	6–12	12–6	11–7	7–5	7–5	—

=== Roster ===
1986 San Diego Padres
Roster
Pitchers: 51 Greg Booker; 43 Dave Dravecky; 54 Goose Gossage; 40 Andy Hawkins; 25 Ray Hayward; 31 LaMarr Hoyt; 45 Jimmy Jones; 24 Dave LaPoint; 37 Craig Lefferts; 41 Lance McCullers; 30 Eric Show; 47 Bob Stoddard; 49 Tim Stoddard; 38 Mark Thurmond; 50 Ed Vosberg; 48 Gene Walter; 32 Ed Whitson; 26 Ed Wojna	Catchers: 15 Bruce Bochy; 16 Terry Kennedy; 27 Mark Parent; 10 Benito Santiago; Infielders: 12 Randy Asadoor; 11 Tim Flannery; 6 Steve Garvey; 20 Gary Green; 8 Dane Iorg; 9 Graig Nettles; 17 Tim Pyznarski; 5 Randy Ready; 2 Bip Roberts; 3 Jerry Royster; 1 Garry Templeton; 12 Mark Wasinger	Outfielders: 19 Tony Gwynn; 44 John Kruk; 14 Carmelo Martínez; 18 Kevin McReynolds; 7 Marvell Wynne	Manager: 22 Steve Boros; Coaches: 36 Galen Cisco; 33 Harry Dunlop; 29 Deacon Jones; 34 Jack Krol; 32 Ozzie Virgil

=== Notable transactions ===
- July 9, 1986: Tim Stoddard was traded by the Padres to the New York Yankees for Ed Whitson.

== Player stats ==
=== Batting ===
==== Starters by position ====
Note: Pos = Position; G = Games played; AB = At bats; H = Hits; Avg. = Batting average; HR = Home runs; RBI = Runs batted in

Pos	Player	G	AB	H	Avg.	HR	RBI
C	Terry Kennedy	141	432	114	.264	12	57
1B	Steve Garvey	155	557	142	.255	21	81
2B	Tim Flannery	134	368	103	.280	3	28
3B	Graig Nettles	126	354	77	.218	16	55
SS	Garry Templeton	147	510	126	.247	2	44
LF	John Kruk	122	278	86	.309	4	38
CF	Kevin McReynolds	158	560	161	.288	26	96
RF	Tony Gwynn	160	642	211	.329	14	59

==== Other batters ====
Note: G = Games played; AB = At bats; H = Hits; Avg. = Batting average; HR = Home runs; RBI = Runs batted in

Player	G	AB	H	Avg.	HR	RBI
Marvelle Wynne	137	288	76	.264	7	37
Jerry Royster	118	257	66	.257	5	26
Carmelo Martínez	113	244	58	.238	9	25
Bip Roberts	101	241	61	.253	1	12
Bruce Bochy	63	127	32	.252	8	22
Dane Iorg	90	106	24	.226	2	11
Benito Santiago	17	62	18	.290	3	6
Randy Asadoor	15	55	20	.364	0	7
Tim Pyznarski	15	42	10	.238	0	0
Gary Green	13	33	7	.212	0	2
Mark Parent	8	14	2	.143	0	0
Mark Wasinger	3	8	0	.000	0	1
Randy Ready	1	3	0	.000	0	0

=== Pitching ===
==== Starting pitchers ====
Note: G = Games pitched; IP = Innings pitched; W = Wins; L = Losses; ERA = Earned run average; SO = Strikeouts

Player	G	IP	W	L	ERA	SO
Andy Hawkins	37	209.1	10	8	4.30	117
Dave Dravecky	26	161.1	9	11	3.07	87
Eric Show	24	136.1	9	5	2.97	94
Ed Wojna	7	39.0	2	2	3.23	19
Jimmy Jones	3	18.0	2	0	2.50	15
Ray Hayward	3	10.0	0	2	9.00	6

==== Other pitchers ====
Note: G = Games pitched; IP = Innings pitched; W = Wins; L = Losses; ERA = Earned run average; SO = Strikeouts

Player	G	IP	W	L	ERA	SO
LaMarr Hoyt	35	159.0	8	11	5.15	85
Ed Whitson	17	75.2	1	7	5.59	46
Mark Thurmond	17	70.2	3	7	6.50	32
Dave LaPoint	24	61.1	1	4	4.26	41
Ed Vosberg	5	13.2	0	1	6.59	8

==== Relief pitchers ====
Note: G = Games pitched; IP = Innings pitched; W = Wins; L = Losses; SV = Saves; ERA = Earned run average; SO = Strikeouts

Player	G	IP	W	L	SV	ERA	SO
Rich Gossage	45	64.2	5	7	21	4.45	63
Lance McCullers	70	136.0	10	10	5	2.78	92
Craig Lefferts	83	107.2	9	8	4	3.09	72
Gene Walter	57	98.0	2	2	1	3.86	84
Tim Stoddard	30	45.1	1	3	0	3.77	47
Bob Stoddard	18	23.1	1	0	1	2.31	17
Greg Booker	9	11.0	1	0	0	1.64	7
Dane Iorg	2	3.0	0	0	0	12.00	2

== Award winners ==
- Tony Gwynn, National League Leader At-Bats (642)
- Tony Gwynn, National League Leader Hits (211)
- Tony Gwynn, National League Leader Runs (107)
- Craig Lefferts, National League Leader for Appearances by a Pitcher (83)

1986 Major League Baseball All-Star Game

- Tony Gwynn, outfield, starter

== Farm system ==
Level	Team	League	Manager
AAA	Las Vegas Stars	Pacific Coast League	Larry Bowa
AA	Beaumont Golden Gators	Texas League	Steve Smith
A	Reno Padres	California League	Jim Skaalen
A	Charleston Rainbows	South Atlantic League	Pat Kelly
A-Short Season	Spokane Indians	Northwest League	Rob Picciolo

LEAGUE CHAMPIONS: Las Vegas
