= Chuck Hensley =

American baseball player (born 1959)

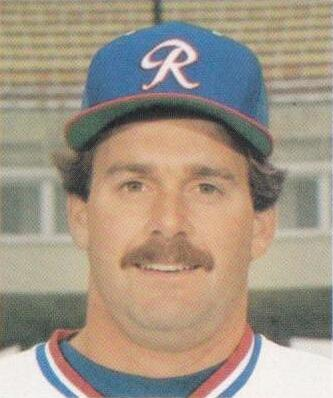
- Hensley with the Richmond Braves c. 1987
- Relief pitcher
- Born: March 11, 1959 (age 67); Tulare, California, U.S.
- Batted: Left Threw: Left

MLB debut
- May 10, 1986, for the San Francisco Giants

Last MLB appearance
- July 2, 1986, for the San Francisco Giants

MLB statistics
- Win–loss record: 0–0
- Earned run average: 2.45
- Strikeouts: 6
- Stats at Baseball Reference

Teams
- San Francisco Giants (1986)

Charles Floyd Hensley (born March 11, 1959) is an American former professional relief pitcher who played for the San Francisco Giants of Major League Baseball (MLB) in their 1986 season.

== Sources ==
- Career statistics from Baseball Reference · Baseball Reference (Minors) · Retrosheet · Baseball Almanac, or Retrosheet
