= Mike Martin (catcher) =

American baseball player (born 1958)

- Catcher
- Born: December 3, 1958 (age 67); Portland, Oregon, U.S.
- Batted: Left Threw: Right

MLB debut
- August 15, 1986, for the Chicago Cubs

Last MLB appearance
- September 27, 1986, for the Chicago Cubs

MLB statistics
- Batting average: .077
- At bats: 13
- Hits: 1
- Stats at Baseball Reference

Teams
- Chicago Cubs (1986)

Joseph Michael Martin (born December 3, 1958) is an American former professional baseball catcher. He played eight games for the Chicago Cubs of the Major League Baseball(MLB) in 1986, getting just one hit, a double in 13 at bats. He holds the distinction of catching the final out of Greg Maddux's first win, a complete-game victory over Cincinnati on September 7, having initially entered the game as a pinch-runner for Jody Davis. 1986 was Martin's last professional season after nine years in minor league baseball.
