= Hipólito Peña =

Dominican baseball player (born 1964)

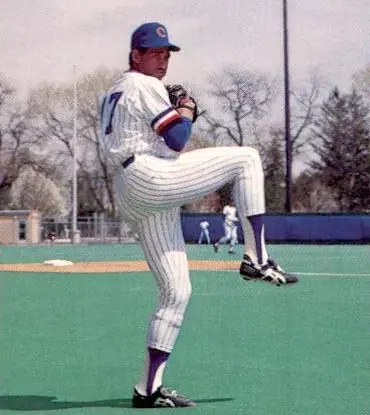
- Peña with the Columbus Clippers c. 1988
- Pitcher
- Born: January 30, 1964 (age 62); Fantino, Dominican Republic
- Batted: Left Threw: Left

MLB debut
- September 1, 1986, for the Pittsburgh Pirates

Last MLB appearance
- September 30, 1988, for the New York Yankees

MLB statistics
- Win–loss record: 1–7
- Earned run average: 4.84
- Strikeouts: 32
- Stats at Baseball Reference

Teams
- Pittsburgh Pirates (1986–1987); New York Yankees (1988)

Hipólito Peña Concepción (born January 30, 1964) is a Dominican former professional baseball pitcher. He pitched parts of three seasons in Major League Baseball, from 1986 until 1988, for the Pittsburgh Pirates and New York Yankees.

== Career ==
He was drafted by the Milwaukee Brewers in 1981, and began his professional career in Butte that same year. In 1982, he was brought up to Pikeville. In 1983, he split time between Aguascalien and Beloit, and after the season was traded to the Pittsburgh Pirates, where he started with the Bradenton Pirates. In 1985, he split time between Miami and Prince William. In 1986, he started out in Nashua where he made his debut on September 1. In 1987, he sent back down to minors to play for Vancouver. Then after a good start in Vancouver, he was brought up to the Pittsburgh Pirates again. On March 30, 1988, he was traded to the New York Yankees for Orestes Destrade.

== Sources ==
- Career statistics from Baseball Reference · Baseball Reference (Minors) · Retrosheet · Baseball Almanac
