= Rubén Rodríguez (baseball) =

Dominican baseball player (born 1964)

- Catcher
- Born: August 4, 1964 (age 62); Cabrera, María Trinidad Sánchez, Dominican Republic
- Batted: Right Threw: Right

MLB debut
- September 15, 1986, for the Pittsburgh Pirates

Last MLB appearance
- October 1, 1988, for the Pittsburgh Pirates

MLB statistics
- Games played: 4
- At bats: 8
- Hits: 1
- Stats at Baseball Reference

Teams
- Pittsburgh Pirates (1986, 1988)

Rubén Dario Rodríguez Martinez (born August 4, 1964) is a Dominican former Major League Baseball (MLB) catcher. Rodríguez played for the Pittsburgh Pirates in 1986 and 1988.
