= Dan Schatzeder =

American baseball player (born 1954)

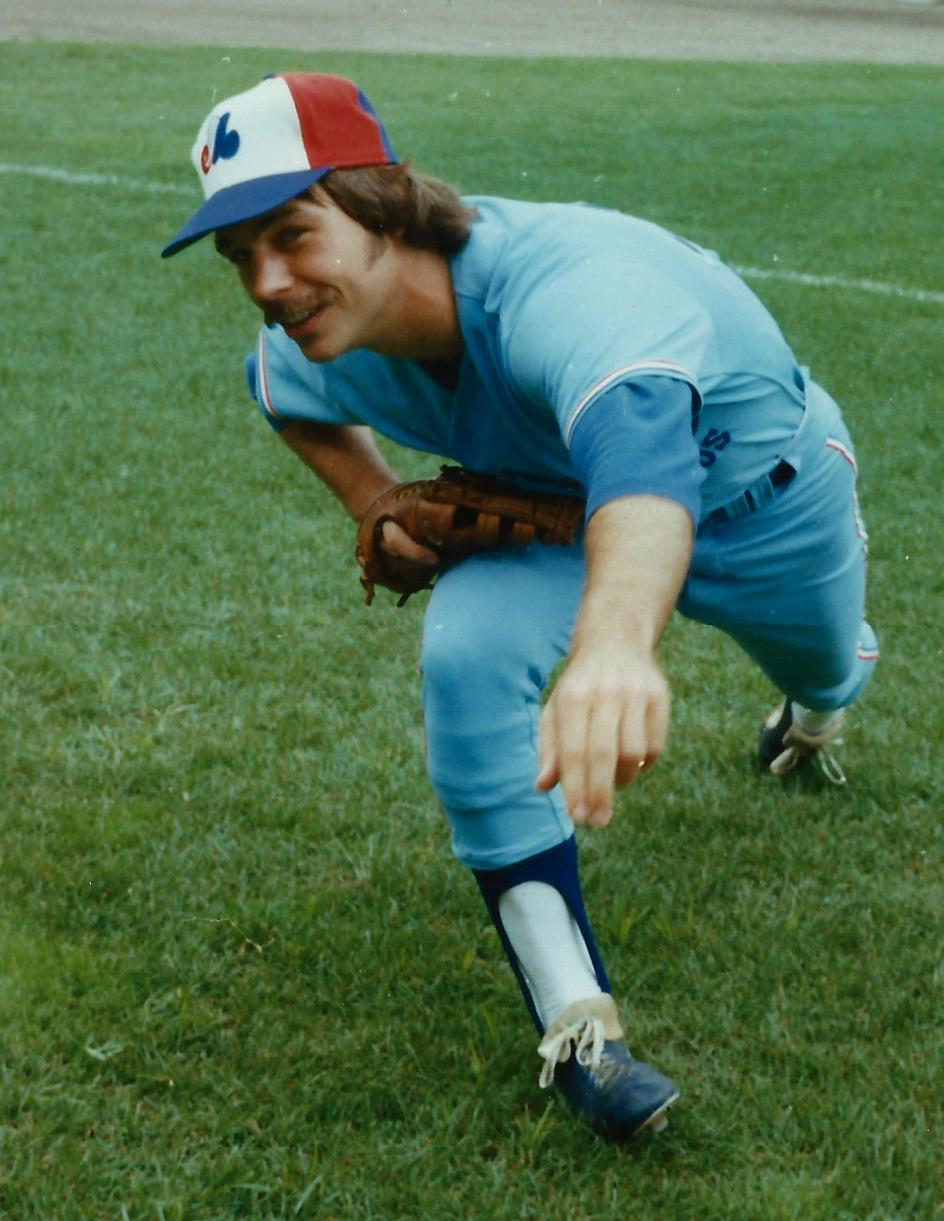
- Pitcher
- Born: December 1, 1954 (age 70); Elmhurst, Illinois, U.S.
- Batted: Left Threw: Left

MLB debut
- September 4, 1977, for the Montreal Expos

Last MLB appearance
- May 25, 1991, for the Kansas City Royals

MLB statistics
- Win–loss record: 69–68
- Earned run average: 3.74
- Strikeouts: 748
- Stats at Baseball Reference

Teams
- Montreal Expos (1977–1979); Detroit Tigers (1980–1981); San Francisco Giants (1982); Montreal Expos (1982–1986); Philadelphia Phillies (1986–1987); Minnesota Twins (1987); Cleveland Indians (1988); Minnesota Twins (1988); Houston Astros (1989–1990); New York Mets (1990); Kansas City Royals (1991)

Career highlights and awards
- World Series champion (1987)

Daniel Ernest Schatzeder (born December 1, 1954) is an American former professional baseball player who pitched in the major leagues from 1977–1991 for nine different teams. Schatzeder attended Willowbrook High School in Villa Park, Illinois, then played college baseball at the University of Denver. After he retired from the majors, he was a physical fitness teacher at Waubonsie Valley High School in Aurora, Illinois, until he retired after the 2014-2015 school year.

He was traded from the Montreal Expos to the Detroit Tigers for Ron LeFlore on December 7, 1979. This followed a season in which his 2.83 earned run average (ERA) was the lowest among National League left‐handed pitchers who qualified for the statistical title.

Schatzeder was a good hitting pitcher in his major league career. He posted a .240 batting average (58-for-242) with 5 home runs, 29 RBI, 18 bases on balls and a .351 slugging percentage.

== Career highlights ==
- In 1986, Schatzeder had 5 pinch hits for the Montreal Expos, the most by a pitcher since Don Newcombe in 1959.
- Schatzeder was the winning pitcher for the Minnesota Twins in Game 6 of the 1987 World Series.
- Schatzeder was the only pitcher to surrender more than one home run to Ozzie Smith, who hit just 28 over his career.
