= Phil Ouellette =

American baseball player (born 1959)

- Catcher
- Born: November 10, 1959 (age 66); Salem, Oregon, U.S.
- Batted: Switch Threw: Right

MLB debut
- September 10, 1986, for the San Francisco Giants

Last MLB appearance
- October 3, 1986, for the San Francisco Giants

MLB statistics
- Batting average: .174
- Home runs: 0
- Runs batted in: 0
- Stats at Baseball Reference

Teams
- San Francisco Giants (1986)

Philip Roland Ouellette (born November 10, 1959) is an American former professional baseball catcher. He played in 10 games for the San Francisco Giants of the Major League Baseball (MLB) in 1986.

Ouellette was originally signed by the Giants as an amateur free agent in 1981, and was released by them following the 1987 season. He later played in the Seattle Mariners, Houston Astros, and Detroit Tigers organizations.

Ouelette was working as a department manager at a Home Depot when he crossed picket lines during the 1994–95 Major League Baseball strike to play for the California Angels during spring training in 1995.

== Sources ==
- Career statistics from Baseball Reference · Baseball Reference (Minors) · Retrosheet · Baseball Almanac
