= Jim Winn =

American baseball player (born 1959)

- Pitcher
- Born: September 23, 1959 (age 66); Stockton, California, U.S.
- Batted: Right Threw: Right

MLB debut
- April 10, 1983, for the Pittsburgh Pirates

Last MLB appearance
- September 6, 1988, for the Minnesota Twins

MLB statistics
- Win–loss record: 12–17
- Earned run average: 4.67
- Strikeouts: 159
- Stats at Baseball Reference

Teams
- Pittsburgh Pirates (1983–1986); Chicago White Sox (1987); Minnesota Twins (1988)

James Francis Winn (born September 23, 1959) is an American former professional baseball pitcher. He played all or part of six seasons in Major League Baseball from 1983 to 1988.

== Biography ==
Winn was born in Stockton, California and grew up in Clever, Missouri. Winn attended John Brown University in Siloam Springs, Arkansas. On June 8, 1981, he was drafted by the Pittsburgh Pirates in the first round (14th pick overall) of the 1981 amateur draft. Winn made his major league debut on April 10, 1983 with the Pittsburgh Pirates.

Winn played for the Pirates from 1982 to 1986. On March 27, 1987, he was traded by the Pittsburgh Pirates to the Chicago White Sox for John Cangelosi. He was released by the White Sox during spring training in 1988. He signed with the Minnesota Twins shortly thereafter and finished his major league career with them.
