= Ray Soff =

American baseball player (born 1958)

- Pitcher
- Born: October 31, 1958 (age 67); Adrian, Michigan, U.S.
- Batted: Right Threw: Right

MLB debut
- July 17, 1986, for the St. Louis Cardinals

Last MLB appearance
- May 28, 1987, for the St. Louis Cardinals

MLB statistics
- Win–loss record: 5–2
- Earned run average: 4.19
- Strikeouts: 31
- Stats at Baseball Reference

Teams
- St. Louis Cardinals (1986–1987)

Raymond John Soff (born October 31, 1958) is an American former professional baseball pitcher. He played in Major League Baseball (MLB) for the St. Louis Cardinals in 1986 and 1987. In 1976 he helped lead Blissfield High School to the State Championship.
