= Andy McGaffigan =

American baseball player (born 1956)

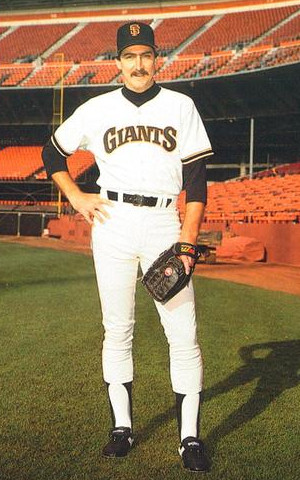
- Pitcher
- Born: October 25, 1956 (age 69); West Palm Beach, Florida, U.S.
- Batted: Right Threw: Right

MLB debut
- September 22, 1981, for the New York Yankees

Last MLB appearance
- July 6, 1991, for the Kansas City Royals

MLB statistics
- Win–loss record: 38–33
- Earned run average: 3.38
- Strikeouts: 610
- Stats at Baseball Reference

Teams
- New York Yankees (1981); San Francisco Giants (1982–1983); Montreal Expos (1984); Cincinnati Reds (1984–1985); Montreal Expos (1986–1989); San Francisco Giants (1990); Kansas City Royals (1990–1991)

Andrew Joseph McGaffigan (born October 25, 1956) is an American former professional baseball player who pitched in Major League Baseball from 1981 to 1991.

== Amateur career ==
A native of West Palm Beach, Florida, McGaffigan attended Twin Lakes High School, Palm Beach Community College and Florida Southern College. He was selected by the New York Yankees in the 6th round of the 1978 MLB draft.

== Professional career ==
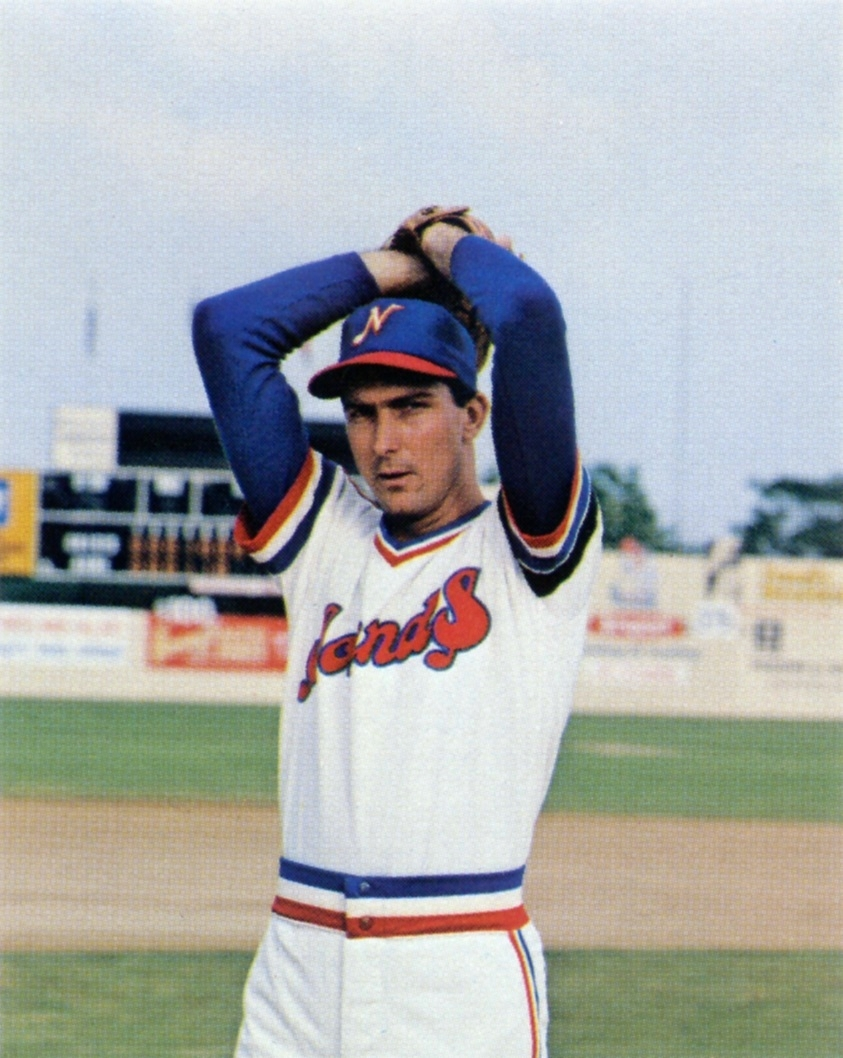
McGaffigan with the Nashville Sounds in 1980

McGaffigan began his first season in professional baseball in 1978 with the Oneonta Yankees of the Class A-Short Season New York–Penn League and the Class A Fort Lauderdale Yankees of the Florida State League. He pitched to a 4–6 record with a 3.12 earned run average (ERA) and 36 strikeouts in 78 innings with the two teams.

For 1979, he was promoted to the Double-A West Haven Yankees of the Eastern League, where he went 10–6 with a 3.81 ERA and 113 strikeouts in 144 innings of work. He continued at Double-A in 1980 for the Yankees' new affiliate, the Nashville Sounds of the Southern League. McGaffigan led the circuit with a 2.38 ERA while accumulating a 15–5 record with 125 strikeouts over 170 innings. He was named to the postseason All-Star team and won the Southern League Most Outstanding Pitcher Award.

In 1981 with the Triple-A Columbus Clippers in the International League, he went 8–6 with a 3.23 ERA and 57 strikeouts in 103 innings before being called up to the Yankees after the season.

McGaffigan made his major league debut on September 22, 1981, pitching three innings of relief against the Cleveland Indians at Yankee Stadium. He faced 14 batters, allowing one hit, walking three, and allowing no runs. He appeared in one other game that season.

Prior to the 1982 season, the Yankees shipped him to the San Francisco Giants in a trade for Doyle Alexander. After appearing in only four games for the Giants in 1982, McGaffigan became a regular contributor in 1983, tossing 134.1 innings for San Francisco.

After spending 1984 and 1985 with the Montreal Expos and Cincinnati Reds, McGaffigan had his most productive season in 1986 with the Expos, hurling 142.2 innings, and posting a 10–5 record with a 2.65 ERA for Montreal. He appeared in over 50 games for the Expos in each of the following three campaigns, and recorded impressive ERAs of 2.39 and 2.76 in 1987 and 1988.

The Expos traded McGaffigan back to the Giants prior to the 1990 season, but after just four appearances, San Francisco shipped him to the Kansas City Royals, where he appeared in 24 games and posted a 3.09 ERA for the duration of the season. The Royals released McGaffigan in July 1991.

McGaffigan batted .048 in his career with 6 big league hits in 126 at-bats.
