= 1986 New York Mets season =

Major League Baseball season

1986 New York Mets
- World Series champions National League champions National League East champions
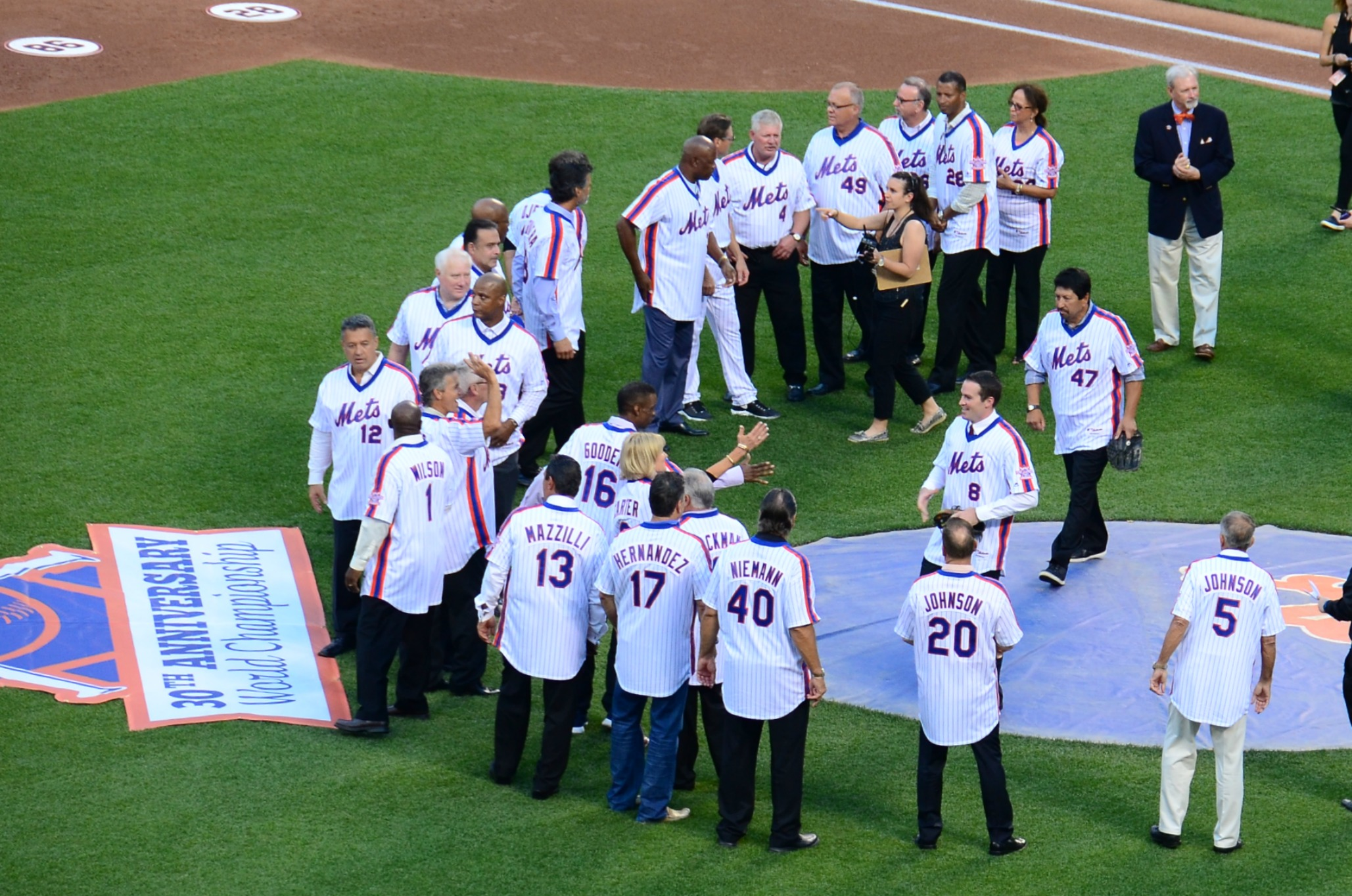
- The 1986 World Champion New York Mets reuniting at Citi Field for the team's 30th anniversary in 2016
- League: National League
- Division: East
- Ballpark: Shea Stadium
- City: New York
- Record: 108–54 (.667)
- Divisional place: 1st
- Owners: Nelson Doubleday Jr. and Fred Wilpon
- General manager: Frank Cashen
- Manager: Davey Johnson
- Television: WOR-TV 9 (Ralph Kiner, Tim McCarver, Steve Zabriskie, Rusty Staub); SportsChannel New York (Ralph Kiner, Tim McCarver, Fran Healy, Rusty Staub)
- Radio: WHN–AM 1050 (Bob Murphy, Gary Thorne, Juan Alicea (SP))

During the 1986 Major League Baseball (MLB) season, the New York Mets won the National League East (NL East), the National League Championship Series (NLCS) and the 1986 World Series, the team's second and most recent World Series championship. General manager Frank Cashen and manager Davey Johnson built a powerful team that compiled one of the best regular season records in MLB history.

The Mets' season began on April 8, 1986, with a victory over the Pittsburgh Pirates at Three Rivers Stadium, and they were soon in first place, where they remained the rest of the season. Playing their 25th season in the National League, the Mets improved from a 98–64 record in 1985 to a franchise-best 108–54. They were never seriously challenged in the NL East, defeating the second-place Philadelphia Phillies by 21 1/2 games. They went on to defeat the Houston Astros in six games in the NLCS and the American League champion Boston Red Sox in seven games in the World Series. Both series featured a memorable extra-inning Game 6 won by the Mets after being down to their final at-bat: over the Astros to win the NLCS and over the Red Sox to avoid elimination and force a Game 7.

The 1986 Mets have been described as one of the best teams in MLB history. Nevertheless, the failure to sustain the success has marred the team's legacy. During the season, many team members drank heavily, and the 1986 Mets have become known for their lifestyle off the field.

== Background ==
The New York Mets began play in 1962, and for their first seven years were known mostly for losing. Despite this, they attracted considerable fan support, especially once Shea Stadium opened in 1964. By 1968, they had one of the National League's premier pitching staffs, but still finished ninth in the ten-team league. But the following year, the "Miracle Mets" won the National League East with a 100–62 record and swept the Atlanta Braves in the 1969 National League Championship Series. The American League champions, the Baltimore Orioles, who had won 109 games during the regular season, had difficulty taking New York seriously, given the team's reputation for losing. They learned to do so, as in the 1969 World Series, the Mets defeated the Orioles, four games to one.

The Mets failed to build on this triumph. In 1973, the Mets, despite a mediocre regular season, took the defending champion Oakland A's to the seventh game of the 1973 World Series. That would be the last postseason appearance for the Mets until 1986. Minimal success followed 1973, leading into losing seasons in the late 1970s and early 1980s, with low attendance. Many fans were alienated by the 1977 trade of pitcher Tom Seaver in a contract dispute. In 1979, the Mets finished last, 35 games behind the Pittsburgh Pirates, and drew fewer than 800,000 fans to Shea Stadium, the lowest full-season attendance thus far in team history.

In January 1980, Nelson Doubleday Jr. and Fred Wilpon purchased the Mets. They hired Frank Cashen as general manager. He began work, warning that it would take four or five years to build a winning team. One advantage the Mets' woeful record had gotten them was the first pick in the 1979 MLB Draft, which they used to select Darryl Strawberry. Cashen made only one minor trade in 1980, spending the season observing, and the team avoided last place for the first time since 1976, finishing fifth. The 1981 season saw improvement, with young prospects such as Hubie Brooks and Mookie Wilson playing well. The team briefly contended in the second half of the strike-marred 1981 season, before fading due to injuries.

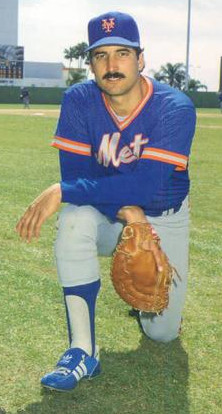
The acquisition of Keith Hernandez was a key ingredient in building the 1986 Mets.

The 1982 Mets started well, six games over .500 on Memorial Day, and then fell apart, losing 97 games and coming within two of the team record for consecutive losses, set at 17 by the woeful 1962 Mets. Cashen made a number of trades, acquiring Ron Darling and George Foster, and with the fifth selection in the 1982 MLB Draft took Dwight Gooden. The Mets finished last again in 1983, but Strawberry won NL Rookie of the Year and the Mets' young pitching staff showed potential. The Mets acquired former Most Valuable Player Keith Hernandez from the St. Louis Cardinals.

Before the 1984 season, Cashen hired former Oriole Davey Johnson as manager. Despite an abundance of quality pitching, the Mets were picked to finish last again. Gooden won seventeen games and the NL Rookie of the Year award and Strawberry started the All-Star Game as the Mets finished second, 6 1/2 games behind the Chicago Cubs. The Mets improved what was already a strong lineup by acquiring slugging catcher Gary Carter from the Montreal Expos in December 1984. The Mets built by such trades: of the eight position players who started most for the 1986 Mets, only four were originally signed by New York, and of the four regular starting pitchers, only Gooden was a Mets draft pick. In 1985, the Mets won 98 games and took the Cardinals to the final weekend of the regular season before finishing second, three games back. Despite having the most wins in baseball for the combined 1984 and 1985 seasons, in an era before the wild card in baseball, the Mets had no playoff appearances to show for it.

== Offseason ==
The Mets signed no expensive free agents in the 1985–86 offseason. GM Frank Cashen did not favor free agency, and most baseball owners, at the request of the new baseball commissioner, Peter Ueberroth, had agreed to refrain from signing free agents to keep salary costs down. For this, they were later penalized for collusion. Given Cashen's views on the subject, the Mets might have stayed out of the free agent market anyway, but their rivals also doing so benefitted New York.

Notable offseason transactions involving the Mets included:

- November 13, 1985: Calvin Schiraldi, Wes Gardner, John Christensen, and La Schelle Tarver are traded by the Mets to the Boston Red Sox for Bob Ojeda, Tom McCarthy, John Mitchell and Chris Bayer (minors).
- November 13, 1985: Kelvin Chapman, Brent Gaff and Tom Paciorek were released by the Mets, who sent Clint Hurdle, Randy Niemann and Terry Leach to the Tidewater Mets.
- December 10, 1985: Hurdle was selected by the Cardinals from the Mets in the 1985 rule 5 draft.
- January 16, 1986: Ronn Reynolds was traded by the New York Mets with Jeff Bittiger to the Philadelphia Phillies for Rodger Cole and Ronnie Gideon.
- January 16, 1986: Billy Beane, Joe Klink, and Bill Latham were traded by the Mets to the Minnesota Twins for Tim Teufel and Pat Crosby (minors).
- March 4, 1986: Tim Corcoran was signed as a free agent by the Mets.

== Spring training ==
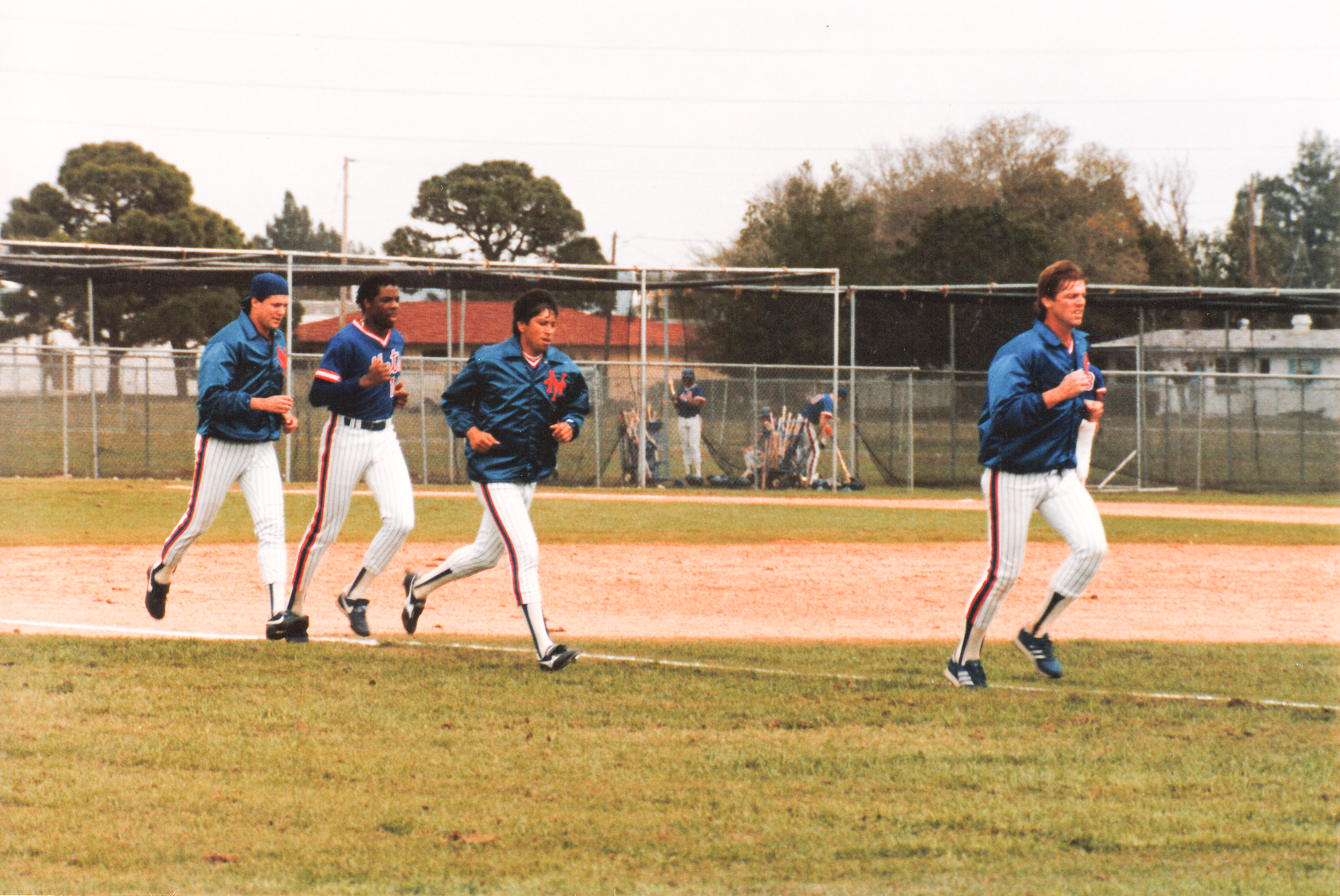
Mets spring training in 1986

One issue that shadowed the Mets as they began preparation for the 1986 season was the involvement of Hernandez in cocaine use–he had testified during a criminal trial in Pittsburgh during the previous year's pennant race. On February 28, 1986, Commissioner Ueberroth suspended Hernandez, along with six players on other teams, for a year, but allowed them to play the 1986 season if they agreed to drug testing, performed community service and donated part of their salaries to anti-drug initiatives. All affected players agreed to these terms.

The 1986 Mets held spring training at Al Lang Stadium in St. Petersburg, Florida for the 25th season, at facilities that they shared with the Cardinals. Tired of the arrangement, the Mets signed an agreement in June 1986 to move to a complex in Port St. Lucie, Florida. During the exhibition season, the Mets posted a record of 13 wins, 13 losses and a tie. One major injury during spring training was to Mookie Wilson, whose sunglasses shattered when hit by a thrown ball during a drill. He needed eye surgery and was out for two months.

== Regular season ==
The 1986 Mets were my introduction to the experience of being good, and of course it was a complete anomaly—our one and only unstoppable winning machine. We were the favorite in every game we played. The Mets were the favorite. We were supposed to win and we did. It'll never happen again ... It felt less like magic, more like curb-stomping. The '86 Mets were crude and brutish and swaggering, and they kept punching people ... The '86 Mets were a pack of savages, and I loved it.

— Devin Gordon (2021). So Many Ways to Lose: The Amazing True Story of the New York Mets, the Best Worst Team in Sports, p. 183

=== April ===
The Mets won their opening day game against the Pirates at Three Rivers Stadium on April 8, but then lost three of their next four, including extra-inning losses to the Cardinals and Philadelphia Phillies. But when the Mets beat the Pirates on April 22 for their fifth straight victory, moving their record to 7–3, they took over first place, a position they would never relinquish.

The Mets had their first off-the-field controversy of the season, with Gooden involved in an altercation at LaGuardia Airport while returning a rental car. Although this later led to Gooden doing commercials for another rental car company, there were negative headlines in the New York press at the time.

Their toughest test in this stretch happened in St. Louis in a four-game series. On April 24, with the Cardinals leading 4–2 in the top of the ninth, Howard Johnson hit a game-tying home run and the Mets won in ten innings, the first blown ninth inning lead for the Cardinals in 90 games. After Gooden shut out the Cardinals in the second game, New York completed the sweep with two more wins. Cardinals manager Whitey Herzog told sportswriters, "The Mets are the team to beat. Hell, they think they won the last two years anyway." The Mets finished the month 13–3, 4 1/2 games in front of the Cardinals and the best start in franchise history.

=== May ===
After posting the best winning percentage of any month in franchise history in April, the Mets won twice more, over the Braves, before losing, but then started a seven-game winning streak, thus winning 18 of 19 games and posting an overall record of 20–5. By then, four of the Mets' five NL East rivals were at least nine games back, including the Cardinals, leaving only the Expos, whom the Mets had not yet played. On May 15, after a victory over Houston and ex-Met Nolan Ryan, Gary Carter stated that the other teams "must be thinking, 'Gee, when are the Mets going to take a dive?' Well, we don't plan on it."

Many of the Mets drank heavily, including on the charter aircraft taking the team from city to city. Davey Johnson, a hard drinker both as a player and as Mets manager, strongly disliked taking on the role of disciplinarian, and avoided it. Though some Mets, like Gary Carter and Mookie Wilson, were well-behaved, others, such as Danny Heep, Doug Sisk and Jesse Orosco, drank heavily in the rear of the team aircraft (and elsewhere) and were known as the "Scum Bunch".

The Mets continued from Houston on a nine-game West Coast swing, on which they went 5–4. The Mets had rarely had success on West Coast road trips in recent years and counted it a victory to return to Shea with the same four-game lead they had left with. On May 27 at Shea, the Mets and Dodgers had an on-the-field brawl after Dodgers reliever Tom Niedenfuer hit Ray Knight with a pitch after George Foster had hit a grand slam home run. The Mets went 18–9 in May and ended the month with a season record of 31–12.

=== June ===
The Mets had suffered injuries to third baseman Howard Johnson and to Strawberry, the latter causing great concern since an injury to him the previous year was blamed with costing the Mets the division title. Both returned in June; the Mets were 6–3 in Strawberry's absence.

Playing against the Pirates at Three Rivers Stadium on June 6, the Mets were in another on-field brawl, this one sparked by a dispute between Pirates pitcher Rick Rhoden and Mets first base coach Bill Robinson over whether Rhoden was tampering with the ball. The Mets split a doubleheader with the Pirates that day, with Strawberry went 4–7 with a home run on his first day back, and the Mets took four of five games in that series. On June 10 against the Phillies, reserve infielder Tim Teufel hit a pinch-hit, game-winning grand slam in the 11th inning.

New York finally played Montreal in mid-June; the Expos won two of three at Stade Olympique, with Gooden losing the third game, and Montreal also won two of three at Shea, with Gooden pitching poorly in a no decision. Despite an 8–2 record, Gooden was pitching badly enough that there was speculation as to what might be wrong–his increasing cocaine habit was not yet publicly known. Ahead by 9 1/2 games at month's end, the Mets went 19–9 during June and finished the month with a season record of 50–21.

=== July ===
A Gooden victory over the Astros at Shea on July 4 was the team's eighth straight, and put the Mets 12 1/2 games ahead in the NL East, the second-largest July 4 lead in NL history after the 1912 New York Giants.

The Mets had their third brawl of the season on July 11 when Braves pitcher David Palmer hit Strawberry with a pitch after Carter hit a three-run home run and then took a curtain call to the Shea crowd. Carter, on his next at bat against Palmer hit a grand slam, and the Mets won 11–0.

At the 1986 MLB All-Star Game in Houston, with New York 13 1/2 games ahead, there were five Met players including Gooden, who was the starting (and losing) pitcher for the NL. Also present was Davey Johnson, one of Whitey Herzog's coaches. The night after the All-Star break concluded, still in Houston, the Mets defeated Nolan Ryan and the Astros, 13–2. Then, several Mets went out to a local nightclub and there was an altercation with the Houston police, and four Mets were arrested. Charges were dropped, but there was massive publicity and the Mets lost the remaining games in the series.

The remaining brawl the Mets had on the field in 1986 occurred at Cincinnati's Riverfront Stadium on July 22. In the top of the ninth, Dave Parker dropped the ball that could have been the final out for the Reds, allowing the Mets to tie the game. In the bottom of the tenth, Eric Davis got to third and brawled with Ray Knight. Both men, along with Kevin Mitchell and Mario Soto, were ejected. Johnson was forced to alternate Orosco and Roger McDowell in the outfield and at pitcher. In the top of the fourteenth, Howard Johnson hit a three-run home run to score the winning runs. The Mets went 16–11 during July and finished the month with a season record of 66–32 and were up by 15 1/2 games in the NL East.

=== August ===
Former MVP George Foster was released after he was benched for Mitchell, and in interviews stated his belief that the benching was not due to his decline in production, but was for racial reasons. Foster had also refused to leave the bench for the brawl in Cincinnati, which was seen by teammates as a refusal to defend them. Former Mets favorite Lee Mazzilli was re-signed, filling Foster's spot on the roster.

By mid-August, the pennant race was just about over, with the Mets up 18 games. The Mets went 21–11 in August and ended the month with a season record, to that point, of 87–43 and were up by 19 games in the NL East.

=== September–October ===
By September 12, the Mets had reduced their magic number, the number of wins (or losses by the second-place team) they needed to clinch the division, to 2, and with a three-game series upcoming at the second-place Phillies, the Mets expected to clinch the division. Droves of Mets fans were at Veterans Stadium hoping to see them clinch the NL East. Instead, the Phillies remained alive in the division by sweeping the Mets.

The Mets then split a two-game series in St. Louis, trimming the magic number to clinch to 1 on September 16. The following day, they hosted Dennis Eckersley and the Chicago Cubs. With Hernandez not in the starting lineup, suffering from the flu, Dave Magadan was the offensive hero of the day. Hernandez returned in the 9th for the final out. Champagne popped in the clubhouse as the fans quickly stormed the field, destroying much of Shea Stadium's grass surface.

The Mets won a team-record 108 games. They went 16–11 during September and won all five regular season October games to end the season with a record of 108–54 while winning the NL East by 21 1/2 games.

== Postseason ==
=== NLCS ===
There was for the Mets the terrifying shadow of a pitcher named Mike Scott hanging over the entire proceedings. In his two starting assignments, Mike Scott positively humiliated New York's killers. After that the Mets kept looking over their shoulders, anticipating when they would see him next, until on the day of the sixteen-inning game, Scott's shadow lent a new kind of ferocity to the Mets' game plan. Time may twist the Mets' memories of that situation, but virtually every one of them felt that the team could not beat Scott. Virtually every one of them believed that either they would win it in six or give back to Scott in Game Seven everything they had created in the magnificent summer of 1986.

— Jerry Izenberg (1987). The Greatest Game Ever Played, p. 17

The Astros had won the NL West with 96 wins, 12 fewer than the Mets. It was the NL East's turn to have home team advantage, but the Houston Oilers had an NFL game scheduled for the same day as Game 4 that could not be moved, and the league scheduled the Astros to have the extra home game. Thus, the Astros hosted the Mets for the first two games of the 1986 National League Championship Series, with Game 1 on October 8 featuring Gooden against Mike Scott. A second-inning home run by Houston's Glenn Davis was the only run as the Astros won the opening game, 1–0. The Mets evened the series the next day as Bob Ojeda outpitched Nolan Ryan, 5–1.

Game 3 at Shea Stadium on October 11 featured a matchup of Bob Knepper versus the Mets' Ron Darling. Houston took a 4–0 lead, including a two-run home run by Bill Doran but the Mets tied it with four runs in the sixth, including a home run by Strawberry with two men on base. Rick Aguilera of the Mets gave up an unearned run in the top of the seventh, but in the bottom of the ninth, Lenny Dykstra of the Mets hit a two-run home run off Houston closer Dave Smith to win the game 6–5, with Orosco taking the decision. Houston pitched Scott again in Game 4; he outdueled Sid Fernandez, 3–1, for his second win of the series.

Postponed a day due to rain, Game 5 was another pitcher's duel with Nolan Ryan for the Astros against Dwight Gooden. Ryan gave up one run in nine innings, while Gooden gave up one run in ten. Wally Backman singled in the twelfth and was brought home by a Carter hit for the winning run in a 2–1 game, with Orosco winning his second game.

The series returned to Houston for its conclusion, with the Mets up three games to two. The Mets were desperate to avoid giving Mike Scott a chance at a third victory in a Game 7. The Astros scored three runs in the bottom of the first and Knepper set to work protecting that lead, allowing no runs through eight innings, and the score remained 3–0 Astros going into the top of the ninth. Three hits by the Mets in the top of the ninth scored two runs and drove Knepper from the game, bringing in Smith, who allowed a sacrifice fly by Knight to tie the score. The game went into extra innings. The Mets scored in the top of the fourteenth, but in the bottom of the inning Billy Hatcher homered to tie the game again at 4–4. In the sixteenth, the Mets scored three times, but the Astros cut the lead to a run before Orosco retired the side for his third win of the series, 7–6, giving the Mets the pennant.

On the flight back to New York, the Mets partied on the charter flight and trashed the plane, causing United Airlines to present them with a bill for $7,500 and a notice that the team's business was no longer welcome.

=== World Series ===
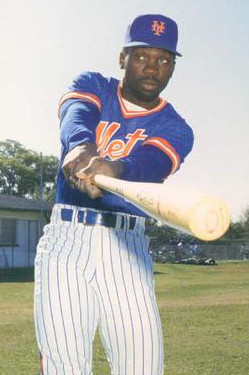
Mookie Wilson's two-run at bat won Game 6.

The Boston Red Sox had defeated the California Angels in the 1986 American League Championship Series. They quickly took the wind out of the Mets' sails by winning the first two games at Shea, the first 1–0 behind Bruce Hurst, the second 9–3, a Steve Crawford win in relief of Roger Clemens over Gooden.

The Mets won Game 3 at Fenway Park behind two Gary Carter home runs, as Bob Ojeda was the winner, 7–1, over Oil Can Boyd. They evened the series behind Darling, 6–2, as Al Nipper took the loss. But Hurst beat the Mets again in Game 5, defeating Gooden, 4–2. This sent the series back to Shea Stadium, with the Mets needing to win two straight games to win the series.

Ojeda and Clemens faced off in Game 6, though neither figured in the decision. The Red Sox took leads of 2–0 and 3–2, but the Mets tied it each time and the game went to extra innings, tied 3–3. In the top of the tenth, Dave Henderson homered and Marty Barrett drove home Wade Boggs to give the Red Sox a 5–3 lead.

In the bottom of the tenth, the first two Mets went quietly against Calvin Schiraldi. With the Mets down to their last out, Carter and Kevin Mitchell singled, and Ray Knight drove home a run with a single to narrow the score to 5–4 and bring Mookie Wilson to the plate. Boston manager John McNamara brought in Bob Stanley to pitch to Wilson. As Wilson batted, he fouled off a series of pitches. Stanley threw a wild pitch to bring home Mitchell and tie the game at 5–5. Wilson hit a ball down the first base line. First baseman Bill Buckner attempted to field it but it went between his legs, Knight scored, and the Mets won 6–5, meaning there would be a series-deciding Game 7.

The final game was postponed a day due to rain, allowing McNamara to start Hurst for the third time. The Red Sox took a 3–0 lead in the second inning, while Hurst allowed little until the sixth inning, when the Mets broke through to tie the score. Schiraldi replaced Hurst, and in the seventh inning, Knight hit a home run and the Mets scored three runs to take a 6–3 lead. Boston narrowed the lead to 6–5 in the top of the eighth, but two runs, including a home run from Strawberry, gave the Mets an 8–5 lead. Jesse Orosco, who had been brought in to relieve Roger McDowell in the eighth, retired the Red Sox in the ninth to give the Mets their second World Series championship.

== Aftermath ==
The Mets owned New York City because they were New York City. In 1986, way before the Giuliani crackdowns, the Big Apple was a cesspool of sin ... There was a ruthlessness floating through the air, a vibe that the movie Wall Street summed up perfectly. Mets manager Davey Johnson guaranteed that his team would dominate, and the town didn't flinch. They expected nothing less.

— Jeff Pearlman (2004). The Bad Guys Won, p. 5

New York City threw a parade for the Mets the day after Game 7; two million fans attended. Not among those present was Dwight Gooden, who would have a difficult winter, including an arrest in his hometown of Tampa, culminating with his testing positive for cocaine at the start of the 1987 season and entering a rehabilitation facility. The 1986 Mets have become as known for their partying as for their success on the baseball diamond, in large part due to Jeff Pearlman's 2004 bestseller, The Bad Guys Won. Pearlman stated that there could be no parallel to the 1986 Mets in the 21st century:

There's no way with Twitter and cell phones, iPhones, that the '86 Mets could have lived that way—there's no way. At [the bar] Finn McCool's getting wasted and someone would videotape it. Or some woman would have taken pictures [of] her hooking up with ... No. Impossible.

In 1987, just like in 1985, the Mets finished second, both times three games behind the Cardinals.

The 1988 Mets easily won the NL East, but fell in seven games to Orel Hershiser and the Los Angeles Dodgers in the NLCS. The Mets finished 2nd the next two years, but by then few 1986 Mets remained on the team, and Davey Johnson was fired early in the 1990 season. Despite World Series appearances in 2000 and 2015, they have not won the Series since 1986.

== Legacy ==
In 1987, Bill James said of the 1986 Mets, "In what areas of play were they outstanding? They led the league in both ERA and runs scored ...There may never have been a pennant winner which had such an extraordinary balance of pitching and hitting." In 2000, Rob Neyer and Eddie Epstein ranked the 1986 Mets eighth and tenth, respectively, in lists of all-time great teams. The team is often regarded as one of the best of all time, being cited in 2021 by ESPN as a top contender for best MLB team of the previous half-century. Nevertheless, according to Neyer and Epstein, "Davey Johnson's Mets won only one World Series, which of course hurts their standing in the court of popular opinion."

In 2009, ESPN.com writer David Schoenfeld described Game 6 of the 1986 World Series as the second-greatest sports moment of the 1980s, behind the "Miracle on Ice" of the 1980 Winter Olympics. Jerry Izenberg wrote a book about Game 6 against Houston entitled, The Greatest Game Ever Played Silverman agreed with that assessment: "three decades later, there is not a lot of argument against it. More than a dozen LCS have gone the full seven games since 1986, but the drama of this six-game series remains unparalleled." At the time, it was the longest postseason game ever played; though it has been surpassed in that regard, it remains the longest game in the NLCS. Brett Baker of baseball-reference.com stated, "In retrospect the 1986 Mets were a team of destiny. And this game, when they were up 3–2 in the series, but down 3–0 going into the 9th is a prime example."

ESPN's 30 for 30 in 2021 released a four-part documentary on the 1986 Mets entitled Once Upon a Time in Queens.

Baseball's poet laureate Roger Angell wrote on the two teams' 1986 post-season pivotal games an essay he titled with an anagram, "Not so, Boston", for The New Yorker's December 1, 1986 issue. Angell, confessing his affection for both World Series finalists, though remaining "a Mets fan," waxed lyrically on the drama's participants, including the fans.

"Come on," we fans said again and again, addressing the team or the score or the situation. "Come on!" In the end, that cry didn’t seem to be directed at anything except the sport itself, which twisted and wrung us, day after day, to the point where we wanted the games over with and this strange trial ended, even while we laughed and smiled at each other and wanted it to go on forever. "Wasn't that wonderful!" we cried. "My God, wasn't that terrific?" And "Did you see that? I couldn't bear it! Wasn't it awful!" And then "I just can't take it anymore. It's too much."

== Standings and game logs ==
=== Regular season standings ===
NL East
Team	W	L	Pct.	GB	Home	Road
New York Mets	108	54	.667	—	55‍–‍26	53‍–‍28
Philadelphia Phillies	86	75	.534	21½	49‍–‍31	37‍–‍44
St. Louis Cardinals	79	82	.491	28½	42‍–‍39	37‍–‍43
Montreal Expos	78	83	.484	29½	36‍–‍44	42‍–‍39
Chicago Cubs	70	90	.438	37	42‍–‍38	28‍–‍52
Pittsburgh Pirates	64	98	.395	44	31‍–‍50	33‍–‍48

1986 Game Log
Overall: 108–54 (Home: 55–26; Away: 53–28)
April (13–3) (Home: 5–1; Road: 8–2)

#	Date	Opponent	Score	Win	Loss	Save	Attendance	Stadium	Record	Report	Rank	GB				
1	April 8	@ Pirates	4–2	Gooden (1–0)	Reuschel (0–1)		48,962	Three Rivers Stadium	1–0	Boxscore	1	Tied	6:05 pm EST	WOR-TV		
	April 10	@ Pirates	Postponed (inclement weather); rescheduled for June 6					Three Rivers Stadium				-½				
2	April 11	@ Phillies	9–7	Ojeda (1–0)	Gross (0–1)	Orosco (1)	36,190	Veterans Stadium	2–0	Boxscore	2	-½	7:35 pm EST		SportsChannel New York Plus	
3	April 12	@ Phillies	8–9 (14)	Hudson (1–0)	Niemann (0–1)		22,737	Veterans Stadium	2–1	Boxscore	2	-1 1/2	1:20 pm EST			NBC
4	April 13	@ Phillies	2–4	Rawley (1–0)	Aguilera (0–1)		27,691	Veterans Stadium	2–2	Boxscore	3	-1 1/2	3:05 pm EST	WOR-TV		ABC
5	April 14	Cardinals	2–6 (13)	Perry (1–0)	Niemann (0–2)		47,752	Shea Stadium	2–3	Boxscore	4	-2 1/2	1:35 pm EST	WOR-TV		
	April 16	Cardinals	Postponed (rain); rescheduled for August 14					Shea Stadium				-2 1/2				
	April 17	Cardinals	Postponed (rain); rescheduled for August 17					Shea Stadium				-2 1/2				
6	April 18	Phillies	5–2	Darling (1–0)	Carlton (0–2)	Orosco (2)	26,906	Shea Stadium	3–3	Boxscore	3	-2 1/2	7:35 pm EST	WOR-TV		
7	April 19	Phillies	3–2	Gooden (2–0)	Rawley (1–1)		38,333	Shea Stadium	4–3	Boxscore	3	-2 1/2	1:35 pm EST		SportsChannel New York	
8	April 20	Phillies	8–0	Fernandez (1–0)	Gross (0–2)		41,848	Shea Stadium	5–3	Boxscore	3	-1 1/2	1:35 pm EST	WOR-TV		
9	April 21	Pirates	6–5	McDowell (1–0)	Clements (0–1)		10,282	Shea Stadium	6–3	Boxscore	2	−1	7:35 pm EST	WOR-TV		
10	April 22	Pirates	7–1	Ojeda (2–0)	Kipper (0–1)		15,668	Shea Stadium	7–3	Boxscore	1	Tied	7:35 pm EST		SportsChannel New York Plus	
11	April 24	@ Cardinals	5–4 (10)	McDowell (2–0)	Worrell (0–1)		33,597	Busch Memorial Stadium	8–3	Boxscore	1	+1 1/2	8:35 pm EST		SportsChannel New York Plus	
12	April 25	@ Cardinals	9–0	Gooden (3–0)	Horton (0–2)		43,721	Busch Memorial Stadium	9–3	Boxscore	1	+2 1/2	8:35 pm EST	WOR-TV		
13	April 26	@ Cardinals	4–3	Fernandez (2–0)	Cox (0–1)	Orosco (3)	44,769	Busch Memorial Stadium	10–3	Boxscore	1	+3 1/2	1:20 pm EST			NBC
14	April 27	@ Cardinals	5–3	Ojeda (3–0)	Tudor (3–1)		39,193	Busch Memorial Stadium	11–3	Boxscore	1	+4	3:05 pm EDT	WOR-TV		ABC
15	April 29	@ Braves	10–5	Berenyi (1–0)	McMurtry (0–1)	McDowell (1)	12,258	Atlanta–Fulton County Stadium	12–3	Boxscore	1	+4 1/2	5:40 pm EDT		SportsChannel New York	
16	April 30	@ Braves	8–1	Gooden (4–0)	Johnson (3–1)		23,361	Atlanta–Fulton County Stadium	13–3	Boxscore	1	+5	7:40 pm EDT		SportsChannel New York Plus	

May (18–9) (Home: 9–3; Road: 9–6)

#	Date	Opponent	Score	Win	Loss	Save	Attendance	Stadium	Record	Report	Rank	GB				
17	May 1	@ Braves	2–7	Smith (2–2)	Aguilera (0–2)		8,343	Atlanta–Fulton County Stadium	13–4	Boxscore	1	+4 1/2	5:40 pm EDT		SportsChannel New York	
18	May 2	@ Reds	8–7	Fernandez (3–0)	Gullickson (0–3)	Orosco (4)	20,677	Riverfront Stadium	14–4	Boxscore	1	+5 1/2	7:35 pm EDT	WOR-TV		
19	May 3	@ Reds	4–1	Ojeda (4–0)	Denny (1–3)	Orosco (5)	20,268	Riverfront Stadium	15–4	Boxscore	1	+5 1/2	2:15 pm EDT		SportsChannel New York Plus	
20	May 4	@ Reds	7–2	Darling (2–0)	Soto (2–3)	McDowell (2)	25,407	Riverfront Stadium	16–4	Boxscore	1	+5 1/2	2:15 pm EDT	WOR-TV		
21	May 6	Astros	4–0	Gooden (5–0)	Knepper (5–1)		41,722	Shea Stadium	17–4	Boxscore	1	+5	7:35 pm EDT		SportsChannel New York	
22	May 7	Astros	3–2	Fernandez (4–0)	Ryan (3–4)	Orosco (6)	26,956	Shea Stadium	18–4	Boxscore	1	+5	7:35 pm EDT		SportsChannel New York	
23	May 9	Reds	2–1	Ojeda (5–0)	Soto (2–4)	'McDowell (3)	40,744	Shea Stadium	19–4	Boxscore	1	+5	7:35 pm EDT	WOR-TV		
24	May 10	Reds	5–1	Darling (3–0)	Browning (0–4)		45,303	Shea Stadium	20–4	Boxscore	1	+5	1:20 pm EDT			NBC
25	May 11	Reds	2–3	Gullickson (2–3)	Gooden (5–1)	Franco (4)	44,236	Shea Stadium	20–5	Boxscore	1	+4	1:35 pm EDT	WOR-TV		
26	May 12	Braves	1–0	McDowell (3–0)	Assenmacher (1–1)	Shea Stadium	45,303	Shea Stadium	21–5	Boxscore	1	+5	7:35 pm EDT		SportsChannel New York	
27	May 13	Braves	3–6	Johnson (4–3)	Aguilera (0–3)	Sutter (2)	29,052	Shea Stadium	21–6	Boxscore	1	+4	7:35 pm EDT		SportsChannel New York	
28	May 14	@ Astros	2–6	Knepper (7–1)	Ojeda (5–1)		11,626	Astrodome	21–7	Boxscore	1	+3	8:35 pm EDT	WOR-TV		
29	May 15	@ Astros	6–2	Darling (4–0)	Ryan (3–5)		13,856	Astrodome	22–7	Boxscore	1	+4	8:35 pm EDT	WOR-TV		
30	May 16	@ Dodgers	3–4 (11)	Howell (1–2)	Orosco (0–1)		11,626	Dodger Stadium	22–8	Boxscore	1	+3	10:35 pm EDT	WOR-TV		
31	May 17	@ Dodgers	2–6	Niedenfuer (2–2)	Fernandez (4–1)		39,429	Dodger Stadium	22–9	Boxscore	1	+3	4:05 pm EDT			NBC
32	May 18	@ Dodgers	8–4	Niemann (1–2)	Reuss (2–2)		44,426	Dodger Stadium	23–9	Boxscore	1	+3	3:05 pm EDT	WOR-TV		ABC
33	May 20	@ Giants	2–1	Ojeda (6–1)	LaCoss (4–1)	McDowell (4)	28,837	Candlestick Park	24–9	Boxscore	1	+4	10:35 pm EDT		SportsChannel New York	
34	May 21	@ Giants	7–4	Darling (5–0)	Mason (2–4)		18,618	Candlestick Park	25–9	Boxscore	1	+5	3:05 pm EDT		SportsChannel New York	
35	May 22	@ Giants	2–10	Krukow (6–3)	Gooden (5–2)		27,442	Candlestick Park	25–10	Boxscore	1	+4	4:05 pm EDT		SportsChannel New York	
36	May 23	@ Padres	4–7	Gossage (3–3)	Orosco (0–2)		22,982	Jack Murphy Stadium	25–11	Boxscore	1	+3	10:05 pm EDT	WOR-TV		
37	May 24	@ Padres	5–4	Berenyi (2–0)	Thurmond (2–4)	Orosco (7)	36,679	Jack Murphy Stadium	26–11	Boxscore	1	+3	10:05 pm EDT		SportsChannel New York	
38	May 25	@ Padres	4–2 (11)	Orosco (1–2)	Lefferts (3–2)		30,296	Jack Murphy Stadium	27–11	Boxscore	1	+4	4:05 pm EDT	WOR-TV		
39	May 27	Dodgers	8–1	Darling (6–0)	Welch (3–4)		35,643	Shea Stadium	28–11	Boxscore	1	+4 1/2	7:35 pm EDT	WOR-TV		
40	May 28	Dodgers	4–2	Gooden (6–2)	Reuss (2–4)		41,032	Shea Stadium	29–11	Boxscore	1	+5 1/2	7:35 pm EDT	WOR-TV		
41	May 29	Dodgers	5–2	Fernandez (5–1)	Valenzuela (7–3)	Orosco (8)	41,080	Shea Stadium	30–11	Boxscore	1	+6	7:35 pm EDT		SportsChannel New York	
42	May 30	Giants	8–7 (10)	Orosco (2–2)	Davis (1–3)		38,243	Shea Stadium	31–11	Boxscore	1	+6	7:35 pm EDT	WOR-TV		
43	May 31	Giants	3–7	Garrelts (5–5)	Ojeda (6–2)		50,498	Shea Stadium	31–12	Boxscore	1	+6	7:05 pm EDT		SportsChannel New York	

June (19–9) (Home: 11–6; Road: 8–3)

#	Date	Opponent	Score	Win	Loss	Save	Attendance	Stadium	Record	Report	Rank	GB				
44	June 1	Giants	3–7	Krukow (7–3)	Darling (6–1)		49,041	Shea Stadium	31–13	Boxscore	1	+6	3:05 pm EDT	WOR-TV		ABC
45	June 2	Padres	11–2	Gooden (7–2)	Hoyt (2–2)		28,426	Shea Stadium	32–13	Boxscore	1	+6 1/2	7:35 pm EDT		SportsChannel New York	
46	June 3	Padres	4–5	Hawkins (4–4)	Fernandez (5–2)	Gossage (9)	25,196	Shea Stadium	32–14	Boxscore	1	+6 1/2	7:35 pm EDT	WOR-TV		
47	June 4	Padres	4–2	McDowell (4–0)	Walter (1–1)		26,735	Shea Stadium	33–14	Boxscore	1	+7 1/2	7:35 pm EDT	WOR-TV		
48	June 5	@ Pirates	7–0	Ojeda (7–2)	Kipper (1–5)		8,855	Three Rivers Stadium	34–14	Boxscore	1	+8 1/2	7:35 pm EDT		SportsChannel New York	
49	June 6	@ Pirates	1–7	Rhoden (5–3)	Darling (6–2)	Walk (2)	N/A	Three Rivers Stadium	34–15	Boxscore	1	+8	5:35 pm EDT	WOR-TV		
50	June 6	@ Pirates	10–4	McDowell (5–0)	León (1–3)		15,113	Three Rivers Stadium	35–15	Boxscore	1	+8	8:57 pm EDT	WOR-TV		
51	June 7	@ Pirates	6–4	Gooden (8–2)	Reuschel (4–5)	Orosco (9)	29,770	Three Rivers Stadium	36–15	Boxscore	1	+9	7:05 pm EDT		SportsChannel New York	
52	June 8	@ Pirates	4–3	Fernandez (6–2)	McWilliams (1–4)	Orosco (10)	14,391	Three Rivers Stadium	37–15	Boxscore	1	+9	1:35 pm EDT	WOR-TV		
53	June 9	Phillies	2–3 (10)	Carman (3–0)	Sisk (0–1)	Bedrosian (8)	26,050	Shea Stadium	37–16	Boxscore	1	+8	7:35 pm EDT		SportsChannel New York	
54	June 10	Phillies	8–4 (11)	McDowell (6–0)	Lerch (0–1)		27,472	Shea Stadium	38–16	Boxscore	1	+8	7:35 pm EDT	WOR-TV		
55	June 11	Phillies	5–3	Darling (7–2)	Carlton (4–7)	Orosco (11)	27,830	Shea Stadium	39–16	Boxscore	1	+8	7:35 pm EDT	WOR-TV		
56	June 13	Pirates	6–5	Orosco (3–2)	Clements (0–2)		37,582	Shea Stadium	40–16	Boxscore	1	+9	7:35 pm EDT	WOR-TV		
57	June 14	Pirates	5–1	Fernandez (7–2)	Bielecki (4–4)		47,664	Shea Stadium	41–16	Boxscore	1	+10	1:35 pm EDT		SportsChannel New York	
58	June 15	Pirates	4–1	Ojeda (8–2)	Walk (2–3)		N/A	Shea Stadium	42–16	Boxscore	1	+10 1/2	1:05 pm EDT	WOR-TV		
59	June 15	Pirates	8–5	Aguilera (1–3)	Kipper (2–6)	McDowell (5)	41,847	Shea Stadium	43–16	Boxscore	1	+10 1/2	4:08 pm EDT	WOR-TV		
60	June 16	@ Expos	4–1 (10)	Sisk (1–1)	Reardon (6–4)		16,347	Olympic Stadium	44–16	Boxscore	1	+11 1/2	7:35 pm EDT		SportsChannel New York	
61	June 17	@ Expos	2–4	Hesketh (4–4)	Berenyi (2–1)	Burke (4)	20,193	Olympic Stadium	44–17	Boxscore	1	+10 1/2	7:35 pm EDT	WOR-TV		
62	June 18	@ Expos	4–7	Youmans (6–5)	Gooden (8–3)	Reardon (16)	22,026	Olympic Stadium	44–18	Boxscore	1	+9 1/2	7:35 pm EDT	WOR-TV		
	June 19	Cubs	Postponed (rain); rescheduled for July 29					Shea Stadium				+10				
63	June 20	Cubs	10–3	Fernandez (8–2)	Sanderson (3–5)		44,817	Shea Stadium	45–18	Boxscore	1	+10	7:35 pm EDT	WOR-TV		
64	June 21	Cubs	6–8	Fontenot (3–2)	Orosco (3–3)		42,566	Shea Stadium	45–19	Boxscore	1	+10	1:35 pm EDT		SportsChannel New York	
65	June 22	Cubs	4–2	Darling (8–2)	Sutcliffe (4–9)		46,279	Shea Stadium	46–19	Boxscore	1	+10	1:35 pm EDT	WOR-TV		
66	June 23	Expos	4–5 (10)	Burke (5–2)	Orosco (3–4)		44,199	Shea Stadium	46–20	Boxscore	1	+9	7:35 pm EDT		SportsChannel New York	
67	June 24	Expos	2–6	Smith (5–5)	Berenyi (2–2)	McClure (2)	40,092	Shea Stadium	46–21	Boxscore	1	+8	7:35 pm EDT	WOR-TV		
68	June 25	Expos	5–2	Fernandez (9–2)	McGaffigan (5–3)	McDowell (6)	33,030	Shea Stadium	47–21	Boxscore	1	+9	1:35 pm EDT	WOR-TV		
	June 27	@ Cubs	Postponed (rain); rescheduled for August 6					Wrigley Field				+9 1/2				
69	June 28	@ Cubs	5–2	McDowell (7–0)	Fontenot (3–3)		35,152	Wrigley Field	48–21	Boxscore	1	+9 1/2	3:20 pm EDT			NBC
70	June 29	@ Cubs	7–4	Gooden (9–3)	Sutcliffe (4–10)		34,222	Wrigley Field	49–21	Boxscore	1	+9 1/2	2:20 pm EDT	WOR-TV		
71	June 30	@ Cardinals	7–0	Ojeda (9–2)	Tudor (6–4)		38,819	Busch Memorial Stadium	50–21	Boxscore	1	+9 1/2	8:05 pm EDT			ABC

July (16–11) (Home: 9–6; Road: 7–5)

#	Date	Opponent	Score	Win	Loss	Save	Attendance	Stadium	Record	Report	Rank	GB				
72	July 1	@ Cardinals	2–1	Fernandez (10–2)	Cox (2–6)	McDowell (7)	25,869	Busch Memorial Stadium	51–21	Boxscore	1	+10 1/2	8:35 pm EDT	WOR-TV		
73	July 2	@ Cardinals	4–3	Sisk (2–1)	Forsch (6–5)	Orosco (12)	29,794	Busch Memorial Stadium	52–21	Boxscore	1	+11 1/2	8:35 pm EDT	WOR-TV		
74	July 3	Astros	6–5 (10)	Orosco (4–4)	DiPino (1–4)		48,839	Shea Stadium	53–21	Boxscore	1	+12 1/2	7:35 pm EDT	WOR-TV		
75	July 4	Astros	2–1	Gooden (10–3)	Smith (1–5)		28,557	Shea Stadium	54–21	Boxscore	1	+12 1/2	1:35 pm EDT		SportsChannel New York	
76	July 5	Astros	1–2	Kerfeld (6–1)	McDowell (7–1)		50,939	Shea Stadium	54–22	Boxscore	1	+11 1/2	7:05 pm EDT		SportsChannel New York	
77	July 6	Astros	5–3	Fernandez (11–2)	Knudson (0–3)	McDowell (8)	31,017	Shea Stadium	55–22	Boxscore	1	+11 1/2	1:35 pm EDT	WOR-TV		
78	July 7	Reds	6–7	Robinson (7–0)	Niemann (1–3)	Franco (13)	29,265	Shea Stadium	55–23	Boxscore	1	+11 1/2	7:35 pm EDT		SportsChannel New York	
79	July 8	Reds	4–5 (10)	Franco (3–4)	McDowell (7–2)		35,803	Shea Stadium	55–24	Boxscore	1	+11 1/2	7:35 pm EDT		SportsChannel New York	
80	July 9	Reds	1–11	Browning (7–7)	Gooden (10–4)		38,079	Shea Stadium	55–25	Boxscore	1	+10 1/2	1:35 pm EDT	WOR-TV		
81	July 10	Braves	5–1	Ojeda (10–2)	Smith (7–10)		34,836	Shea Stadium	56–25	Boxscore	1	+10 1/2	7:35 pm EDT	WOR-TV		
82	July 11	Braves	11–0	Fernandez (12–2)	Palmer (5–8)		39,924	Shea Stadium	57–25	Boxscore	1	+11 1/2	8:35 pm EDT			NBC
83	July 12	Braves	10–1	Aguilera (2–3)	Mahler (10–8)		30,899	Shea Stadium	58–25	Boxscore	1	+12 1/2	1:50 pm EDT			NBC
84	July 13	Braves	2–0	Darling (9–2)	Alexander (6–5)		41,128	Shea Stadium	59–25	Boxscore	1	+13 1/2	1:35 pm EDT	WOR-TV		
July 15: All-Star Game (AL wins—)			3–2	Clemens (BOS)	Gooden (NYM)	Aase (BAL)	45,774	Astrodome	Houston, Texas							
85	July 17	@ Astros	13–2	Ojeda (11–2)	Ryan (6–7)		21,536	Astrodome	60–25	Boxscore	1	+13 1/2	8:35 pm EDT	WOR-TV		
86	July 18	@ Astros	0–3	Knepper (11–7)	Darling (9–3)		22,906	Astrodome	60–26	Boxscore	1	+12 1/2	8:35 pm EDT	WOR-TV		
87	July 19	@ Astros	4–5	Smith (2–6)	McDowell (7–3)		44,502	Astrodome	60–27	Boxscore	1	+12 1/2	8:35 pm EDT		SportsChannel New York	
88	July 20	@ Astros	8–9 (15)	Knepper (12–7)	McDowell (7–4)		23,900	Astrodome	60–28	Boxscore	1	+12	3:05 pm EDT	WOR-TV		
89	July 21	@ Reds	4–2	Aguilera (3–3)	Soto (3–8)	Orosco (13)	23,827	Riverfront Stadium	61–28	Boxscore	1	+13	8:05 pm EDT			ABC
90	July 22	@ Reds	6–3 (14)	McDowell (8–4)	Willis (1–1)		23,707	Riverfront Stadium	62–28	Boxscore	1	+14	7:35 pm EDT	WOR-TV		
91	July 23	@ Reds	3–2	Darling (10–3)	Robinson (7–1)	McDowell (9)	25,496	Riverfront Stadium	63–28	Boxscore	1	+15	7:35 pm EDT	WOR-TV		
	July 25	@ Braves	Postponed (rain); rescheduled for July 26					Atlanta–Fulton County Stadium				+15				
92	July 26	@ Braves	3–4	Assenmacher (4–2)	McDowell (8–5)		N/A	Atlanta–Fulton County Stadium	63–29	Boxscore	1	+14 1/2	5:40 pm EDT		SportsChannel New York	
93	July 26	@ Braves	5–8	Acker (3–4)	Fernandez (12–3)	Garber (12)	44,400	Atlanta–Fulton County Stadium	63–30	Boxscore	1	+14 1/2	8:46 pm EDT		SportsChannel New York	
94	July 27	@ Braves	5–1	Aguilera (4–3)	Mahler (10–10)		33,338	Atlanta–Fulton County Stadium	64–30	Boxscore	1	+15 1/2	2:10 pm EDT	WOR-TV		
95	July 28	Cubs	9–2	Ojeda (12–2)	Sanderson (5–7)	McDowell (10)	38,890	Shea Stadium	65–30	Boxscore	1	+16 1/2	7:35 pm EDT		SportsChannel New York	
96	July 29	Cubs	3–0	Darling (11–3)	Trout (4–4)		N/A	Shea Stadium	66–30	Boxscore	1	+16 1/2	5:35 pm EDT		SportsChannel New York	
97	July 29	Cubs	1–2	Moyer (11–3)	Sisk (2–2)	Smith (18)	45,731	Shea Stadium	66–31	Boxscore	1	+16 1/2	8:21 pm EDT		SportsChannel New York	
98	July 30	Cubs	3–4	Eckersley (5–6)	Fernandez (12–4)	Smith (19)	35,734	Shea Stadium	66–32	Boxscore	1	+15 1/2	7:35 pm EDT	WOR-TV		

August (21–11) (Home: 7–5; Road: 14–6)

#	Date	Opponent	Score	Win	Loss	Save	Attendance	Stadium	Record	Report	Rank	GB				
99	August 1	Expos	3–1	Gooden (11–4)	Youmans (10–7)	McDowell (11)	47,883	Shea Stadium	67–32	Boxscore	1	+16 1/2	7:35 pm EDT	WOR-TV		
100	August 2	Expos	4–1	Aguilera (5–3)	Sebra (1–2)	Orosco (14)	43,069	Shea Stadium	68–32	Boxscore	1	+17 1/2	7:05 pm EDT		SportsChannel New York	
101	August 3	Expos	4–3 (10)	McDowell (9–5)	McClure (2–3)		47,167	Shea Stadium	69–32	Boxscore	1	+17 1/2	1:35 pm EDT	WOR-TV		
102	August 4	@ Cubs	2–4	Eckersley (6–6)	Darling (11–4)	Smith (20)	29,016	Wrigley Field	69–33	Boxscore	1	+17 1/2	4:05 pm EDT		SportsChannel New York	
103	August 5	@ Cubs	5–8	Smith (7–7)	McDowell (9–6)		28,211	Wrigley Field	69–34	Boxscore	1	+16 1/2	4:05 pm EDT		SportsChannel New York	
104	August 6	@ Cubs	7–6 (12)	McDowell (10–6)	Frazier (2–4)		N/A	Wrigley Field	70–34	Boxscore	1	+17	1:05 pm EDT	WOR-TV		
105	August 6	@ Cubs	7–6	Anderson (1–0)	Trout (4–5)	Orosco (15)	33,343	Wrigley Field	71–34	Boxscore	1	+17	5:37 pm EDT		SportsChannel New York Plus	
106	August 7	@ Cubs	12–3	Aguilera (6–3)	Sanderson (5–9)		28,725	Wrigley Field	72–34	Boxscore	1	+17	2:20 pm EDT	WOR-TV		
107	August 8	@ Expos	3–5	Smith (8–6)	Ojeda (12–3)	Reardon (26)	21,027	Olympic Stadium	72–35	Boxscore	1	+16	7:35 pm EDT	WOR-TV		
108	August 9	@ Expos	10–8	McDowell (11–6)	Reardon (6–7)	Orosco (16)	33,093	Olympic Stadium	73–35	Boxscore	1	+17	7:35 pm EDT		SportsChannel New York	
109	August 10	@ Expos	7–2	Fernandez (13–4)	Martínez (1–4)	Anderson (1)	35,743	Olympic Stadium	74–35	Boxscore	1	+18	1:35 pm EDT	WOR-TV		
110	August 11	@ Phillies	8–4	Gooden (12–4)	Carman (5–4)		43,133	Veterans Stadium	75–35	Boxscore	1	+19	8:05 pm EDT			ABC
111	August 12	@ Phillies	1–3	Gross (8–9)	Aguilera (6–4)		36,442	Veterans Stadium	75–36	Boxscore	1	+18	7:35 pm EDT		SportsChannel New York	
112	August 13	@ Phillies	4–8	Ruffin (4–3)	Ojeda (12–4)		39,041	Veterans Stadium	75–37	Boxscore	1	+18	7:35 pm EDT	WOR-TV		
113	August 14	Cardinals	4–3	McDowell (12–6)	Worrell (7–9)		N/A	Shea Stadium	76–37	Boxscore	1	+17 1/2	5:35 pm EDT		SportsChannel New York	
114	August 14	Cardinals	1–5	Horton (2–3)	Anderson (1–1)		48,949	Shea Stadium	76–38	Boxscore	1	+17 1/2	8:56 pm EDT		SportsChannel New York	
115	August 15	Cardinals	2–4 (10)	Perry (2–2)	Orosco (4–5)	Worrell (26)	46,780	Shea Stadium	76–39	Boxscore	1	+16	7:35 pm EDT	WOR-TV		
116	August 16	Cardinals	1–3 (11)	Mathews (9–3)	McDowell (12–7)	Worrell (27)	44,873	Shea Stadium	76–40	Boxscore	1	+16	2:20 pm EDT			NBC
117	August 17	Cardinals	1–2	Tudor (12–6)	Aguilera (6–5)	Perry (2)	N/A	Shea Stadium	76–41	Boxscore	1	+16 1/2	1:05 pm EDT	WOR-TV		
118	August 17	Cardinals	9–2	Niemann (2–3)	Cox (7–10)	McDowell (12)	44,843	Shea Stadium	77–41	Boxscore	1	+16 1/2	4:32 pm EDT	WOR-TV		
119	August 18	@ Dodgers	5–4	Ojeda (13–4)	Hershiser (12–9)	McDowell (13)	46,099	Dodger Stadium	78–41	Boxscore	1	+17	8:05 pm EDT			ABC
120	August 19	@ Dodgers	6–4	Darling (12–4)	Valenzuela (15–9)	McDowell (14)	46,977	Dodger Stadium	79–41	Boxscore	1	+18	10:35 pm EDT	WOR-TV		
121	August 20	@ Dodgers	7–5	Fernandez (14–4)	Powell (2–5)	Orosco (17)	36,738	Dodger Stadium	80–41	Boxscore	1	+18 1/2	8:20 pm EDT			NBC
122	August 22	@ Giants	5–3	Gooden (13–4)	Blue (9–8)	McDowell (15)	30,679	Candlestick Park	81–41	Boxscore	1	+19	11:05 pm EDT		SportsChannel New York	
123	August 23	@ Giants	3–2	Ojeda (14–4)	Downs (0–4)	McDowell (16)	31,033	Candlestick Park	82–41	Boxscore	1	+20	4:05 pm EDT		SportsChannel New York	
124	August 24	@ Giants	1–10	Krukow (13–7)	Aguilera (6–6)		31,606	Candlestick Park	82–42	Boxscore	1	+19	4:05 pm EDT	WOR-TV		
125	August 25	@ Padres	5–2	Orosco (5–5)	Lefferts (7–5)	McDowell (17)	18,605	Jack Murphy Stadium	83–42	Boxscore	1	+20	8:05 pm EDT		SportsChannel New York	
126	August 26	@ Padres	11–6	Fernandez (15–4)	Dravecky (9–11)		15,992	Jack Murphy Stadium	84–42	Boxscore	1	+20	10:05 pm EDT	WOR-TV		
127	August 27	@ Padres	6–5 (11)	Sisk (3–2)	Gossage (5–7)		19,747	Jack Murphy Stadium	85–42	Boxscore	1	+20	10:05 pm EDT	WOR-TV		
128	August 29	Dodgers	2–1	Ojeda (15–4)	Honeycutt (9–9)		45,667	Shea Stadium	86–42	Boxscore	1	+20	7:35 pm EDT	WOR-TV		
129	August 30	Dodgers	6–3	Aguilera (7–6)	Hershiser (12–10)	McDowell (18)	44,040	Shea Stadium	87–42	Boxscore	1	+20	2:20 pm EDT			NBC
130	August 31	Dodgers	4–7	Valenzuela (17–9)	Darling (12–5)		45,678	Shea Stadium	87–43	Boxscore	1	+19	1:35 pm EDT	WOR-TV		

September (16–11) (Home: 11–4; Road: 5–7)

#	Date	Opponent	Score	Win	Loss	Save	Attendance	Stadium	Record	Report	Rank	GB				
131	September 1	Giants	5–2	McDowell (13–7)	Davis (4–5)		44,272	Shea Stadium	88–43	Boxscore	1	+19	1:35 pm EDT	WOR-TV		
132	September 2	Giants	3–4	Krukow (14–8)	Gooden (13–5)	Garrelts (7)	26,166	Shea Stadium	88–44	Boxscore	1	+19	7:35 pm EDT	WOR-TV		
133	September 3	Giants	4–2	Ojeda (16–4)	Mulholland (0–6)		25,851	Shea Stadium	89–44	Boxscore	1	+20	7:35 pm EDT		SportsChannel New York	
	September 5	Padres	Postponed (rain); rescheduled for September 7					Shea Stadium				+20 1/2				
134	September 6	Padres	4–3	Orosco (6–5)	McCullers (7–7)		46,879	Shea Stadium	90–44	Boxscore	1	+20 1/2	2:20 pm EDT			NBC
135	September 7	Padres	7–1	Gooden (14–5)	LaPoint (4–8)		N/A	Shea Stadium	91–44	Boxscore	1	+21	1:05 pm EDT	WOR-TV		
136	September 7	Padres	6–5	Sisk (4–2)	Lefferts (7–7)	McDowell (19)	38,630	Shea Stadium	92–44	Boxscore	1	+21	3:54 pm EDT	WOR-TV		
137	September 8	Expos	1–9	Sebra (4–3)	Ojeda (16–5)		38,630	Shea Stadium	92–45	Boxscore	1	+21	7:35 pm EDT		SportsChannel New York	
138	September 9	Expos	7–9	Burke (9–7)	Orosco (6–6)	Reardon (31)	26,867	Shea Stadium	92–46	Boxscore	1	+21	7:35 pm EDT	WOR-TV		
139	September 10	Expos	6–1	Darling (13–5)	Valdez (0–1)		31,934	Shea Stadium	93–46	Boxscore	1	+22	7:35 pm EDT		SportsChannel New York	
140	September 12	@ Phillies	3–6	Ruffin (8–3)	Gooden (14–6)	Bedrosian (24)	43,070	Veterans Stadium	93–47	Boxscore	1	+21	7:35 pm EDT	WOR-TV		
141	September 13	@ Phillies	5–6	Schatzeder (4–4)	McDowell (13–8)	Bedrosian (25)	47,108	Veterans Stadium	93–48	Boxscore	1	+20	7:05 pm EDT		SportsChannel New York	
142	September 14	@ Phillies	0–6	Gross (10–11)	Fernandez (15–5)		38,652	Veterans Stadium	93–49	Boxscore	1	+19	1:35 pm EDT	WOR-TV		
143	September 15	@ Cardinals	0–1 (13)	Worrell (9–10)	McDowell (13–9)		29,566	Busch Memorial Stadium	93–50	Boxscore	1	+18	8:35 pm EDT	WOR-TV		
144	September 16	@ Cardinals	4–2	Aguilera (8–6)	Conroy (4–9)	Orosco (18)	30,935	Busch Memorial Stadium	94–50	Boxscore	1	+18	8:35 pm EDT	WOR-TV		
145	September 17	Cubs	4–2	Gooden (15–6)	Eckersley (6–10)		47,823	Shea Stadium	95–50	Boxscore	1	+19	7:35 pm EDT	WOR-TV		
146	September 18	Cubs	5–0	Anderson (2–1)	Maddux (1–3)		13,726	Shea Stadium	96–50	Boxscore	1	+19	1:35 pm EDT		SportsChannel New York	
147	September 19	Phillies	3–4	Gross (11–11)	Fernandez (15–6)	Bedrosian (27)	35,023	Shea Stadium	96–51	Boxscore	1	+18	7:35 pm EDT	WOR-TV		
148	September 20	Phillies	9–5	Darling (14–5)	Hume (4–1)		39,104	Shea Stadium	97–51	Boxscore	1	+19	7:05 pm EDT		SportsChannel New York	
149	September 21	Phillies	1–7	Freeman (1–0)	Mitchell (0–1)		42,631	Shea Stadium	97–52	Boxscore	1	+18	1:35 pm EDT	WOR-TV		
150	September 22	Cardinals	5–2	Gooden (16–6)	Forsch (14–9)		25,714	Shea Stadium	98–52	Boxscore	1	+19	7:35 pm EDT		SportsChannel New York	
151	September 23	Cardinals	9–1	Ojeda (17–5)	Mathews (10–8)	Orosco (19)	11,203	Shea Stadium	99–52	Boxscore	1	+19	7:35 pm EDT	WOR-TV		
152	September 24	@ Cubs	2–8	Hall (1–1)	Aguilera (8–7)		6,468	Wrigley Field	99–53	Boxscore	1	+19	2:20 pm EDT		SportsChannel New York	
153	September 25	@ Cubs	6–5	McDowell (14–9)	Lynch (5–5)	Orosco (20)	8,840	Wrigley Field	100–53	Boxscore	1	+20	2:20 pm EDT		SportsChannel New York	
154	September 26	@ Pirates	3–1	Fernandez (16–6)	Fansler (0–2)	McDowell (20)	14,080	Three Rivers Stadium	101–53	Boxscore	1	+20	7:35 pm EDT	WOR-TV		
155	September 27	@ Pirates	4–2 (11)	Orosco (7–6)	McWilliams (2–11)	Sisk (1)	13,210	Three Rivers Stadium	102–53	Boxscore	1	+20	7:05 pm EDT		SportsChannel New York	
156	September 28	@ Pirates	4–1 (11)	Aguilera (9–7)	Walk (7–8)		30,606	Three Rivers Stadium	103–53	Boxscore	1	+20	1:35 pm EDT	WOR-TV		
157	September 30	@ Expos	0–1	Sebra (5–5)	Darling (14–6)		6,068	Olympic Stadium	103–54	Boxscore	1	+19 1/2	7:35 pm EDT	WOR-TV		

October (5–0) (Home: 3–0; Road: 2–0)

#	Date	Opponent	Score	Win	Loss	Save	Attendance	Stadium	Record	Report	Rank	GB			
158	October 1	@ Expos	6–4 (11)	Orosco (8–6)	McClure (4–6)	McDowell (21)	10,740	Olympic Stadium	104–54	Boxscore	1	+20	7:05 pm EDT		SportsChannel New York
159	October 2	@ Expos	8–2	Gooden (17–6)	Youmans (13–12)		10,726	Olympic Stadium	105–54	Boxscore	1	+20 1/2	7:35 pm EDT	WOR-TV	
	October 3	Pirates	Postponed (rain); rescheduled for October 4					Shea Stadium				+21			
160	October 4	Pirates	8–2	Ojeda (18–5)	Fansler (0–3)	Orosco (21)	N/A	Shea Stadium	106–54	Boxscore	1	+21 1/2	1:05 pm EDT		SportsChannel New York
161	October 4	Pirates	5–2	Aguilera (10–7)	Patterson (2–3)	McDowell (22)	30,810	Shea Stadium	107–54	Boxscore	1	+21 1/2	3:52 pm EDT		SportsChannel New York
162	October 5	Pirates	9–0	Darling (15–6)	Pena (0–3)	Fernandez (1)	32,170	Shea Stadium	108–54	Boxscore	1	+21 1/2	1:35 pm EDT	WOR-TV	

Legend
Mets win	Mets loss	All-Star Game	Game postponed	Clinched playoff spot

"GB" legend
1st (NL East)	Not in playoff berth	Tied for 1st (NL East)

All times are Eastern time Sources for game logs: Some statistics reproduced from boxscore for each game.

=== Record vs. opponents and by month ===
	Record		
Opponent	Home	Road	Total
NL East
Chicago Cubs	6–3	6–3	12–6
Montreal Expos	5–4	5–4	10–8
Philadelphia Phillies	6–3	2–7	8–10
Pittsburgh Pirates	9–0	8–1	17–1
St. Louis Cardinals	4–5	8–1	12–6
NL West
Atlanta Braves	5–1	3–3	8–4
Cincinnati Reds	2–4	6–0	8–4
Houston Astros	5–1	2–4	7–5
Los Angeles Dodgers	5–1	4–2	9–3
San Diego Padres	5–1	5–1	10–2
San Francisco Giants	3–3	4–2	7–5
Grand Totals	55–26	53–28	108–54

Month	Games	Won	Lost	Pct.
April	16	13	3	.813
May	27	18	9	.667
June	28	19	9	.679
July	27	16	11	.593
August	32	21	11	.656
September	27	16	11	.593
October	5	5	0	1.000
Totals	162	108	54	.667

Source for tables:

=== Notable transactions ===
- April 1, 1986: Tom Gorman was released by the Mets.
- April 5, 1986: Doug Frobel was traded by the Montreal Expos to the New York Mets for Joe Graves (minors) and Rodger Cole (minors).
- June 2, 1986: 1986 Major League Baseball draft
  - Curtis Pride was drafted by the Mets in the 10th round. Player signed June 12, 1986.
  - John Olerud was drafted by the Mets in the 27th round of the 1986 amateur draft, but did not sign.
- June 9, 1986: Tim Corcoran was released by the Mets.
- June 30, 1986: Ed Lynch was traded by the Mets to the Chicago Cubs in exchange for Dave Lenderman and Dave Liddell.
- August 3, 1986: Lee Mazzilli was signed as a free agent by the Mets.
- August 7, 1986: George Foster was released by the Mets.
- August 24, 1986: Alex Diaz was signed as an amateur free agent by the Mets.

=== Postseason game log ===
1986 Postseason Game Log
National League Championship Series vs. Houston – New York (NL) wins series 4–2

#	Date	Opponent	Score	Win	Loss	Save	Attendance	Stadium	Report	Game Time	National TV	National Radio
1	October 8	@ Astros	0–1	Scott (1–0)	Gooden (0–1)		44,131	Astrodome	Boxscore	8:25 pm EDT	ABC	CBS
2	October 9	@ Astros	5–1	Ojeda (1–0)	Ryan (0–1)		44,391	Astrodome	Boxscore	8:20 pm EDT	ABC	CBS
3	October 11	Astros	6–5	Orosco (1–0)	Smith (0–1)		55,052	Shea Stadium	Boxscore	12:10 pm EDT	ABC	CBS
4	October 12	Astros	1–3	Scott (2–0)	Fernandez (0–1)		55,038	Shea Stadium	Boxscore	8:20 pm EDT	ABC	CBS
5	October 14	Astros	2–1 (12)	Orosco (2–0)	Kerfeld (0–1)		54,986	Shea Stadium	Boxscore	1:10 pm EDT	ABC	CBS
6	October 15	@ Astros	7–6 (16)	Orosco (3–0)	López (0–1)		45,718	Astrodome	Boxscore	3:05 pm EDT	ABC	CBS

World Series vs. Boston – New York (NL) wins series 4–3

#	Date	Opponent	Score	Win	Loss	Save	Attendance	Stadium	Report	Game Time	National TV	National Radio
1	October 18	Red Sox	0–1	Hurst (1–0)	Darling (0–1)	Schiraldi (1)	57,908	Shea Stadium	Boxscore	8:30 pm EDT	NBC	CBS
2	October 19	Red Sox	3–9	Crawford (1–0)	Gooden (0–1)	Stanley (1)	57,911	Shea Stadium	Boxscore	8:25 pm EDT	NBC	CBS
3	October 21	@ Red Sox	7–1	Ojeda (1–0)	Boyd (0–1)		33,595	Fenway Park	Boxscore	8:30 pm EDT	NBC	CBS
4	October 22	@ Red Sox	6–2	Darling (1–1)	Nipper (0–1)	Orosco (1)	33,920	Fenway Park	Boxscore	8:25 pm EDT	NBC	CBS
5	October 23	@ Red Sox	2–4	Hurst (2–0)	Gooden (0–2)		34,010	Fenway Park	Boxscore	8:35 pm EDT	NBC	CBS
6	October 25	Red Sox	6–5 (10)	Aguilera (1–0)	Schiraldi (0–1)		57,908	Shea Stadium	Boxscore	8:25 pm EDT	NBC	CBS
7	October 27	Red Sox	8–5	McDowell (1–0)	Schiraldi (0–2)	Orosco (2)	55,032	Shea Stadium	Boxscore	8:10 pm EST	NBC	CBS

Legend
Mets Win	Mets Loss

Source for game logs: Some statistics reproduced from boxscore for each game.

=== Attendance ===
Attendance	Rank in Major Leagues
2,767,601	2 (to L.A. Dodgers)

1985 attendance: 2,762,417, 2nd in attendance behind Dodgers.

=== Opening day lineup ===
Opening Day Starters
#	Name	Position
4	Lenny Dykstra	CF
6	Wally Backman	2B
17	Keith Hernandez	1B
8	Gary Carter	C
18	Darryl Strawberry	RF
15	George Foster	LF
20	Howard Johnson	3B
3	Rafael Santana	SS
16	Dwight Gooden	P

Sourced to:

=== Roster ===
Sourced to:

1986 New York Mets
Roster
Pitchers: 38 Rick Aguilera; 32 Rick Anderson; 31 Bruce Berenyi; 12 Ron Darling; 50 Sid Fernandez; 16 Dwight Gooden; 19 Bob Ojeda; 26 Terry Leach; 36 Ed Lynch; 42 Roger McDowell; 43 John Mitchell; 48 Randy Myers; 40 Randy Niemann; 47 Jesse Orosco; 39 Doug Sisk	Catchers: 8 Gary Carter; 7,35 John Gibbons; 49 Ed Hearn; 33 Barry Lyons; Infielders: 6 Wally Backman; 27,29 Tim Corcoran; 2 Kevin Elster; 17 Keith Hernandez; 20 Howard Johnson; 22 Ray Knight; 29 Dave Magadan; 3 Rafael Santana; 11 Tim Teufel	Outfielders: 4 Lenny Dykstra; 15 George Foster; 25 Danny Heep; 27,32 Stan Jefferson; 13 Lee Mazzilli; 7,35 Kevin Mitchell; 18 Darryl Strawberry; 1 Mookie Wilson	Manager: 5 Davey Johnson; Coaches: 23 Bud Harrelson (Third Base); 51 Vern Hoscheit (Bullpen); 52 Greg Pavlick (Assistant Pitching); 28 Bill Robinson (Hitting/First Base); 30 Mel Stottlemyre (Pitching)

== Player stats ==
= Indicates team leader

=== Batting ===
==== Starters by position ====
Note: Pos = Position; G = Games played; AB = At bats; H = Hits; Avg. = Batting average; HR = Home runs; RBI = Runs batted in

Sourced to:

Pos	Player	G	AB	H	Avg.	HR	RBI	SB
C	Gary Carter	132	490	125	.255	24	105	1
1B	Keith Hernandez	149	551	171	.310	13	83	2
2B	Wally Backman	124	387	124	.320	1	27	13
3B	Ray Knight	137	486	145	.298	11	76	2
SS	Rafael Santana	139	394	86	.218	1	28	0
LF	George Foster	72	233	53	.227	13	38	1
CF	Lenny Dykstra	147	431	127	.295	8	45	31
RF	Darryl Strawberry	136	475	123	.259	27	93	28

==== Other batters ====
Note: G = Games played; AB = At bats; H = Hits; Avg. = Batting average; HR = Home runs; RBI = Runs batted in; SB = Stolen bases

Sourced to:

Player	G	AB	H	Avg.	HR	RBI	SB
Mookie Wilson	123	381	110	.289	9	45	25
Kevin Mitchell	108	328	91	.277	12	43	3
Tim Teufel	93	279	69	.247	4	31	1
Howard Johnson	88	220	54	.245	10	39	8
Danny Heep	86	195	55	.282	5	33	1
Ed Hearn	49	136	36	.265	4	10	0
Lee Mazzilli	39	58	16	.276	2	7	1
Kevin Elster	19	30	5	.167	0	0	0
Stan Jefferson	14	24	5	.208	1	3	0
John Gibbons	8	19	9	.474	1	1	0
Dave Magadan	10	18	8	.444	0	3	0
Barry Lyons	6	9	0	.000	0	2	0
Tim Corcoran	6	7	0	.000	0	0	0

=== Pitching ===
==== Starting pitchers ====
Note: G = Games pitched; IP = Innings pitched; W = Wins; L = Losses; ERA = Earned run average; SO = Strikeouts

Sourced to:

Player	G	IP	W	L	ERA	SO
Dwight Gooden	33	250.1	17	6	2.84	200
Ron Darling	34	237.0	15	6	2.81	184
Sid Fernandez	33	204.1	16	6	3.52	200
Bob Ojeda	32	217.1	18	5	2.57	148
Rick Aguilera	28	141.2	10	7	3.88	105

==== Other pitchers ====
Note: G = Games pitched; IP = Innings pitched; W = Wins; L = Losses; ERA = Earned run average; SO = Strikeouts

Sourced to:

Player	G	IP	W	L	ERA	SO
Rick Anderson	15	49.2	2	1	2.72	21
Bruce Berenyi	14	39.2	2	2	6.35	30
John Mitchell	4	10.0	0	1	3.60	2

==== Relief pitchers ====
Note: G = Games pitched; IP = Innings pitched; W = Wins; L = Losses; ERA = Earned run average; SO = Strikeouts; SV = Saves

Sourced to:

Player	G	IP	W	L	ERA	SO	SV
Roger McDowell	76	128.0	14	9	3.02	65	23
Jesse Orosco	59	81.0	8	6	2.33	62	21
Doug Sisk	41	70.2	4	2	3.06	31	1
Randy Niemann	31	35.2	2	3	3.79	18	0
Randy Myers	10	10.2	0	0	4.22	13	0
Terry Leach	6	6.2	0	0	2.70	4	0
Ed Lynch	1	1.2	0	0	0.00	1	0

== Awards and honors ==
President Ronald Reagan welcomes the World Champion Mets to the White House, November 1986

- Ray Knight, Babe Ruth Award
- Ray Knight, World Series Most Valuable Player Award
- Keith Hernandez, National League First Baseman Gold Glove
- Gary Carter, National League Catcher Silver Slugger Award

== 57th Major League Baseball All-Star Game ==
The 57th Major League Baseball All-Star Game was held at the Astrodome on July 15, 1986, with the American League winning, 3–2. Roger Clemens of the Red Sox was the winning pitcher and Dwight Gooden of the Mets took the loss. Participants from the Mets were as follows:

Infielder

Pos	#	Player	League	AB	H	RBI
1B	17	Keith Hernandez	National League Starter	4	0	0

Outfielder

Pos	#	Player	League	AB	H	RBI
RF	18	Darryl Strawberry	National League Starter	2	1	0

Catcher

#	Player	League	AB	H	RBI
8	Gary Carter	National League Starter	3	0	0

Pitchers

#	Player	League	IP	SO
50	Sid Fernandez	National League	1	3
16	Dwight Gooden	National League Starter	3	2

Coach

#	Coach	League	Position
5	Davey Johnson	National League	Third Base Coach

== Farm system ==
Steve Schryver was farm director for the Mets in 1986.

Level	Team	League	Manager
AAA	Tidewater Tides	International League	Sam Perlozzo
AA	Jackson Mets	Texas League	Mike Cubbage
A	Lynchburg Mets	Carolina League	Bobby Floyd
A	Columbia Mets	South Atlantic League	Tucker Ashford
A-Short Season	Little Falls Mets	New York–Penn League	Rich Miller
Rookie	Kingsport Mets	Appalachian League	Chuck Hiller

Columbia won the league championship.

== Bibliography ==
- Golenbock, Peter (2002). Amazin': the Miraculous History of New York's Most Beloved Baseball Team. St. Martin's Press. ISBN 978-0-312-27452-8.
- Goodman, Michael E. (1999). The History of the New York Mets. Creative Education. ISBN 978-0-88682-917-9.
- Gordon, Devin (2021). So Many Ways to Lose: The Amazin' True Story of the New York Mets, the Best Worst Team in Sports. HarperCollins Publishers. ISBN 978-0-06-294002-5.
- Izenberg, Jerry (1987). The Greatest Game Ever Played. Henry Holt & Co. ISBN 978-0-8050-0513-4.
- Neyer, Rob; Epstein, Eddie (2000). Baseball Dynasties: The Greatest Teams of All Times. W. W. Norton & Co. ISBN 978-0-393-04894-0.
- Pearlman, Jeff (2004). The Bad Guys Won. HarperCollins. ISBN 978-0-06-050732-9.
- Silverman, Matthew (2016). One-Year Dynasty: Inside the Rise and Fall of the 1986 Mets, Baseball's Impossible One-and-Done Champions. Rowman & Littlefield. ISBN 978-1-4930-0909-1.
