= Craig R. Wright =

American baseball writer and proponent of sabermetrics

Craig R. Wright is a baseball writer and historian who pioneered the use of sabermetrics while working for the Texas Rangers of Major League Baseball.

== Career ==
=== Major League Baseball ===
Wright was a very early pioneer in integrating science into Major League Baseball and first began working under that premise for the Texas Rangers, after the 1981 Major League Baseball strike. He soon became the first front office employee to work under the title of sabermetrician, but he abandoned the title around 1990 because he felt "... the meaning had shifted too far from a scientific approach to baseball to one focused on statistical analysis of baseball." By the end of his career, he appeared to be more comfortable being identified with the scouting community than with statistical analysts. In the 2000 media guide of the Colorado Rockies, Wright was listed in their scouting section as "Special Assignment Scout." But in a rare in-depth interview in 2010, he steadfastly maintained his allegiance to the value of a science of baseball while at the same time speaking at length about the dangers of focusing on statistical analysis to understand the game. "I've said it and written it many times: statistical analysis is too often taken for being science itself rather than a tool of science."

Wright worked full-time in major league baseball for over 20 years, mainly in the area of scouting, player evaluation and acquisition. His longest association with one major league team was the Los Angeles Dodgers, with whom he worked ten years as a year-round consultant during a period when they had the second best record in the league behind the Atlanta Braves. With the Dodgers, he significantly helped advance the career of Mike Piazza from non-prospect to blue chip prospect. Wright was an early proponent of Piazza's ability as a hitter and also argued for his staying at the catcher position. He pushed hard for Piazza's rapid advancement to the big leagues while persuasively arguing for the moves that cleared the way for Piazza to be the club's #1 catcher in his rookie year.

Along with Wright's consulting arrangements, from 1989 to 1996 he also provided a supplemental Advance Scout service for post-season play that was used by six pennant winners and four world champions. He ended that service to have the time to serve two years as a year-round consultant to the Arizona Diamondbacks in preparing for their expansion draft. The Diamondbacks' draft is the only expansion draft to produce a 40-homer player (Tony Batista) and two All-Stars who were not their team's token All-Star representative, i.e. not the only All-Star from their team (Batista and Damian Miller).

=== Work outside of Major League Baseball ===
==== Writing ====
Wright was the primary author of The Diamond Appraised (1989) with 10% of the material being provided by pitching coach Tom House. With most of Wright's work taking place outside the public domain, it was a rare look at the type of work he was doing and how it was being used - or not used. In this book Wright was the first to give a sabermetric perspective on many issues within baseball, including the optimal way to utilize a bullpen and pitching rotation, how to better develop pitchers so that they are primed for future success, the significance of home field advantage, and catcher's ERA. Wright's chapters on pitching included a ground-breaking study on pitcher workloads and how they might be better managed. They inspired a wealth of studies, and looking back at the book a dozen years later, Rany Jazayerli, one of the founders of Baseball Prospectus, called Wright's study one of the five most important ever done in baseball. After The Diamond Appraised was translated into Japanese, the Hanshin Tigers of Japan's Central League became a client of his consulting service. The other client of Wright's business that was not a major league team was STATS, Inc. For a dozen years they used Wright as a consultant to design their products for major league teams.

==== Sabermetric community ====
Despite his reservations about a central focus on statistical analysis to understand the game, Wright was well known for his general support of the sabermetric movement. He was one of the early members of the Society for American Baseball Research, served on the Board of Directors of Project Scoresheet, the forerunner of Retrosheet, and he was very open about his appreciation of the early work by Bill James when such a view was still anathema in MLB. In turn, James called Wright a "brilliant analyst of the game", praised his pioneering work, and singled him out for his generous contributions to Bill's work in fine-tuning his concept of Win Shares. Wright repeatedly gave recommendations, help, and encouragement to those who aspired to similar careers in baseball, including Eddie Epstein, Mat Olkin, John Sickels, Keith Woolner, and Bill James. In his retirement from major league baseball, he has responded to offers of employment from the teams by making recommendations of others from the sabermetric community.

==== Radio show ====
Wright was the researcher and writer of the radio show A Page from Baseball's Past which was a pre-game show for various major league teams for 26 years. He created the show with producer Eric Nadel who was also the voice of the show. In 2008 Wright began doing a subscription text version that is still popular today. Bill James, author of the popular Bill James Historical Baseball Abstract has praised the new text version as "... just excellent. I learn a lot from reading it."

=== Wright's perspective on Moneyball ===
Few details were publicly known about Wright's pioneering career until he wrote a few vignettes about that period on his web site for "The Diamond Appraised Baseball Column" that he wrote for three years. They currently remain available in the biography section on Wright in relation to Pages from Baseball's Past. Of particular interest is the very different take he has on those early days of sabermetrics in major league baseball that is quite at odds with the theme in Michael Lewis's Moneyball. Lewis portrayed the early practitioners within the game as simply being ignored. Wright acknowledges that very few teams back then were adding such a perspective, and that the general usage was at times on a small scale, but he makes a strong case that there were pockets where it was not only valued but had real impact. He gives interesting examples from his career and he scores a key point with his question: "All my contracts were 1-year contracts. Do you really think teams are going to keep shelling out the money year after year just to have you give advice that they will ignore?"

In remembering Wright's work with the Texas Rangers, GM Tom Grieve said in a 1999 interview: "He was an important asset to the club," and added, "The more I know Craig, the more I respect him." Tim Mead, the Assistant GM when Wright was a year-round consultant with the Angels, said, "I ... feel [Wright] would have been a great member of a front office staff in a high profile position. [Craig's] impact was felt by many, but should have been shared with more." Dodgers GM Fred Claire echoed those views: "I was very impressed by [Wright's] approach, his evaluation process. ... Craig added some valuable input to the process. ... I felt he was very good as it related to players in not only their major league careers, but also in their minor league careers. ... Craig was able to add a different dimension with his own analysis. ... I can recall when we signed Tom Candiotti [in 1991] we were looking at free agent pitchers, and Craig felt he could be a guy who could give a lot of innings and pitch successfully." (Ignoring the more sought after free agent starting pitchers - including All-Star Frank Viola, whom Wright correctly assessed as headed for arm trouble - the Dodgers signed Candiotti to a bargain contract and he ended up outperforming the rest of his free agent class. During that four-year contract he led the Dodgers in innings and ERA, and his 3.38 ERA was the fourth best in the whole league.) After five years of working with Wright, Claire advised him that he would make a good GM and urged him to apply for a vacancy in St. Louis with his recommendation. This was in the fall of 1994, long before the Moneyball era.

Wright was too far ahead of his time to be hired as a GM, and that slowed the adaptation of his progressive ideas, but that didn't prevent him from continuing to be a pioneer in the development of the game and influencing its future. Years before the so-called Moneyball approach began in Oakland, Wright showed remarkable prescience in an interview in the summer of 1999 in which he advocated for the first time publicly a radical change in pitcher usage that went well beyond what even the most progressive teams were able to envision. He determined that most starting pitchers fell off in their effectiveness after two times through the order, and argued it was possible to reshape pitching staffs so that many of the starters would throw around four innings a start. He said, "First team to do this will have a huge edge." It took a while but nearly 20 years later the Tampa Bay Rays became an over-achieving team that excelled in run prevention with their starting pitchers averaging around four innings per start.

=== After Major League Baseball ===
Wright is semi-retired and lives in Montana where he writes about baseball. His writings in the public domain are now mainly about baseball history, but in 2011 he wrote a lengthy article for The Hardball Times on how to handle pitchers and strongly criticized the current use of pitch counts as doing more harm than good. For the same publication in 2015 he again stepped away from baseball history to write an analytic piece about the explosion of ulnar collateral ligament (UCL) injuries and Tommy John surgery, explained what was behind it and offered ideas for fixing it.

When asked if he would ever return to major league baseball, Wright has said it is "very unlikely", and said that he would never accept a job that would move him from Montana. However, he has apparently continued to do some consulting projects for major league teams through 2015, according to The MVP Machine by Ben Lindbergh and Travis Sawchik.

Wright's story series Pages from Baseball's Past is available on Substack with a free story on Mondays and a second story for paid subscribers on Fridays . Rob Neyer, then a senior baseball writer for ESPN.com advised his readers: "I'm not one of those people who refuses to pay for anything on the Web ... but if I could pay for just one thing, it would probably be Craig Wright's baseball writing."

Wright's latest book is a collection from the story series Pages from Baseball's Past. Eric Nadel, recipient of the Ford C. Frick award wrote: "There is no more passionate baseball historian than Craig Wright. His stories are fascinating, well researched and well written. Craig has a wonderful gift for telling intriguing stories that we have never heard, and providing little known details of familiar tales. ... The photographs are priceless, and the research notes impossible to ignore. For any baseball fan, this book is a true treasure....long overdue....a loving gift to followers of the greatest game in the world."
