= Jacobs School =

Jacobs School may refer to:

- Jacobs School of Engineering at the University of California, San Diego
- Jacobs School of Medicine and Biomedical Sciences at the State University of New York at Buffalo
- Jacobs School of Music at Indiana University Bloomington

== See also ==
- Jacobs High School, in Algonquin, Illinois, United States
