= Christian Bethancourt =

Panamanian baseball player (born 1991)

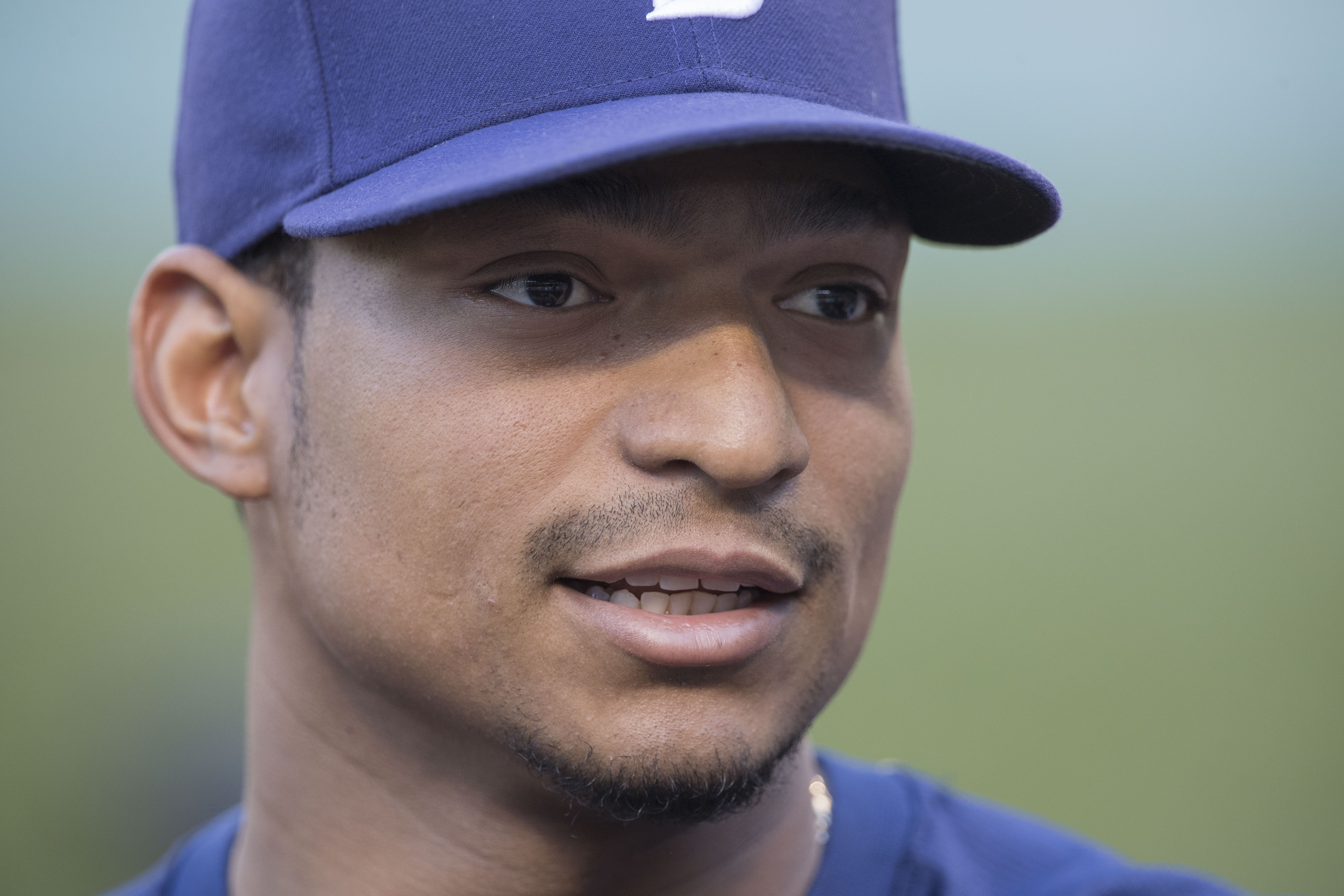
- Bethancourt with the San Diego Padres in 2016

Free agent
- Catcher / First baseman
- Born: September 2, 1991 (age 35); Panama City, Panama
- Bats: Right Throws: Right

Professional debut
- MLB: September 29, 2013, for the Atlanta Braves
- KBO: March 23, 2019, for the NC Dinos

MLB statistics (through 2024 season)
- Batting average: .229
- Home runs: 35
- Runs batted in: 135

KBO statistics (through 2019 season)
- Batting average: .246
- Home runs: 8
- Runs batted in: 29
- Stats at Baseball Reference

Teams
- Atlanta Braves (2013–2015); San Diego Padres (2016–2017); NC Dinos (2019); Oakland Athletics (2022); Tampa Bay Rays (2022–2023); Miami Marlins (2024); Chicago Cubs (2024)

Christian Gabriel Bethancourt Ruiz (born September 2, 1991) is a Panamanian professional baseball catcher and first baseman who is a free agent. He has previously played in Major League Baseball (MLB) for the Atlanta Braves, San Diego Padres, Oakland Athletics, Tampa Bay Rays, Miami Marlins, and Chicago Cubs, and in the KBO League for the NC Dinos. Bethancourt was signed by the Braves as an international free agent in 2008 and made his major league debut for them in 2013.

== Early life ==
Bethancourt was born and raised in Panama City, Panama where he began playing baseball at the age of five. As a third baseman, Bethancourt had a tendency to abandon his position in favor of wherever the ball was hit. His parents convinced him to move behind the plate, saying that if Bethancourt left his position as a catcher during a game, his team would lose, as the other team would find it easy to score.

== Career ==
=== Atlanta Braves ===
==== Minor leagues ====
Bethancourt was signed as an undrafted international free agent and began his minor league career at the age of 16 in 2008. He was named the seventh-most-promising catching prospect in baseball by MLB.com prior to the 2012 season.

Bethancourt played for the Mississippi Braves of the Double–A Southern League in 2012. He was named to the All-Star Futures Game. On August 9, 2012, Bethancourt broke his left hand when he was hit with a pitch. The Braves added him to their 40-man roster after the 2012 season.

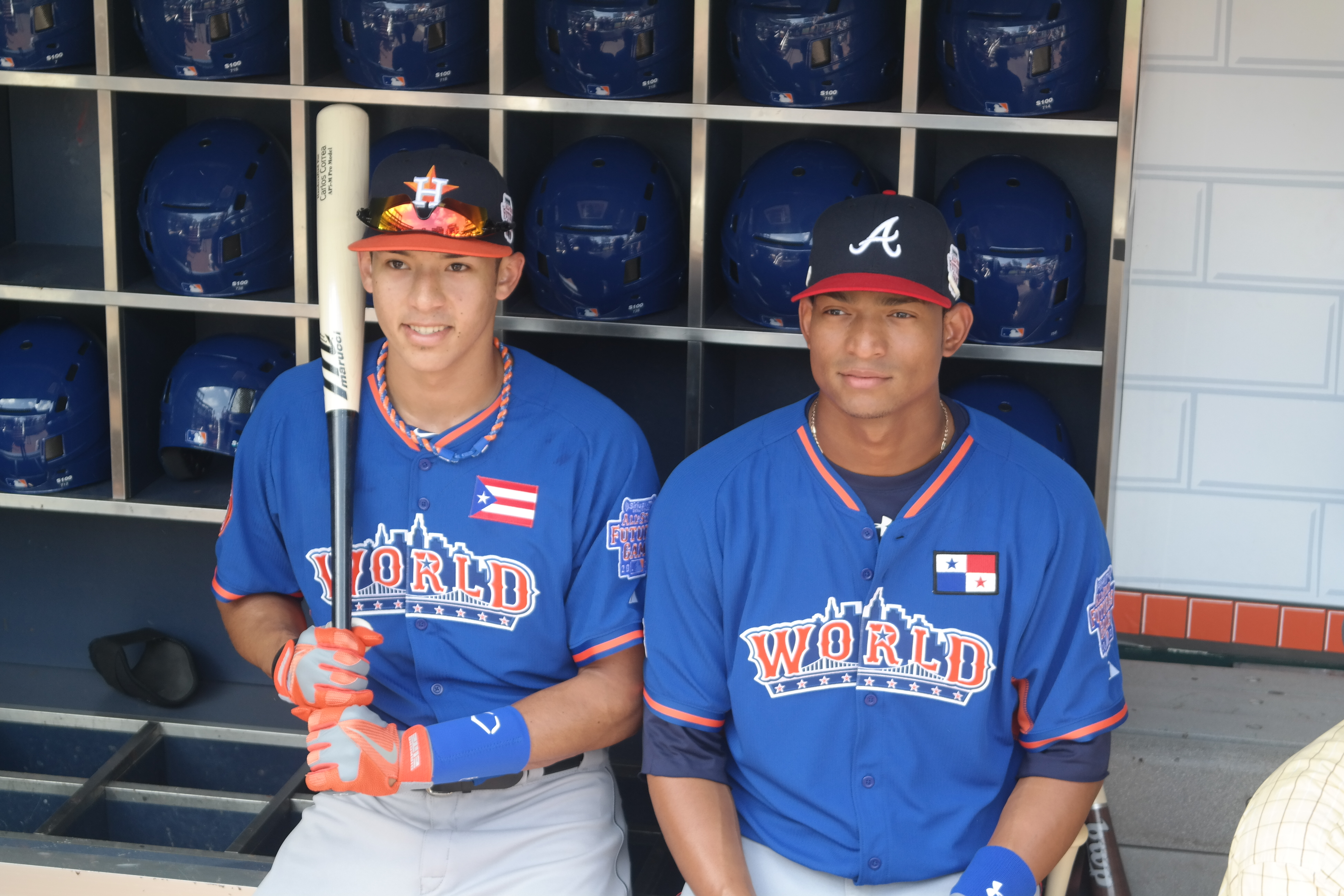
Carlos Correa (left) and Bethancourt at the 2013 All-Star Futures Game

Bethancourt again played for Mississippi in 2013 and made his second All Star Futures Game roster. Following the end of the minor league season, he was promoted and joined the Atlanta Braves on September 9, 2013. Bethancourt made his major league debut against the Philadelphia Phillies on September 29, 2013. He struck out in his only at bat.

==== Major leagues ====
In 2014, Bethancourt began the year with the Gwinnett Braves of the Triple–A International League, and made his third consecutive All Star Futures Game on June 24. He was promoted to the major leagues when Evan Gattis went on the disabled list on June 28. He recorded his first major league RBI on July 1, against Daisuke Matsuzaka. Bethancourt batted .240 with the Braves in 13 games, and was demoted to the minor leagues on July 21, when Gattis was activated from the disabled list. He was to be promoted back to the Braves on September 2.

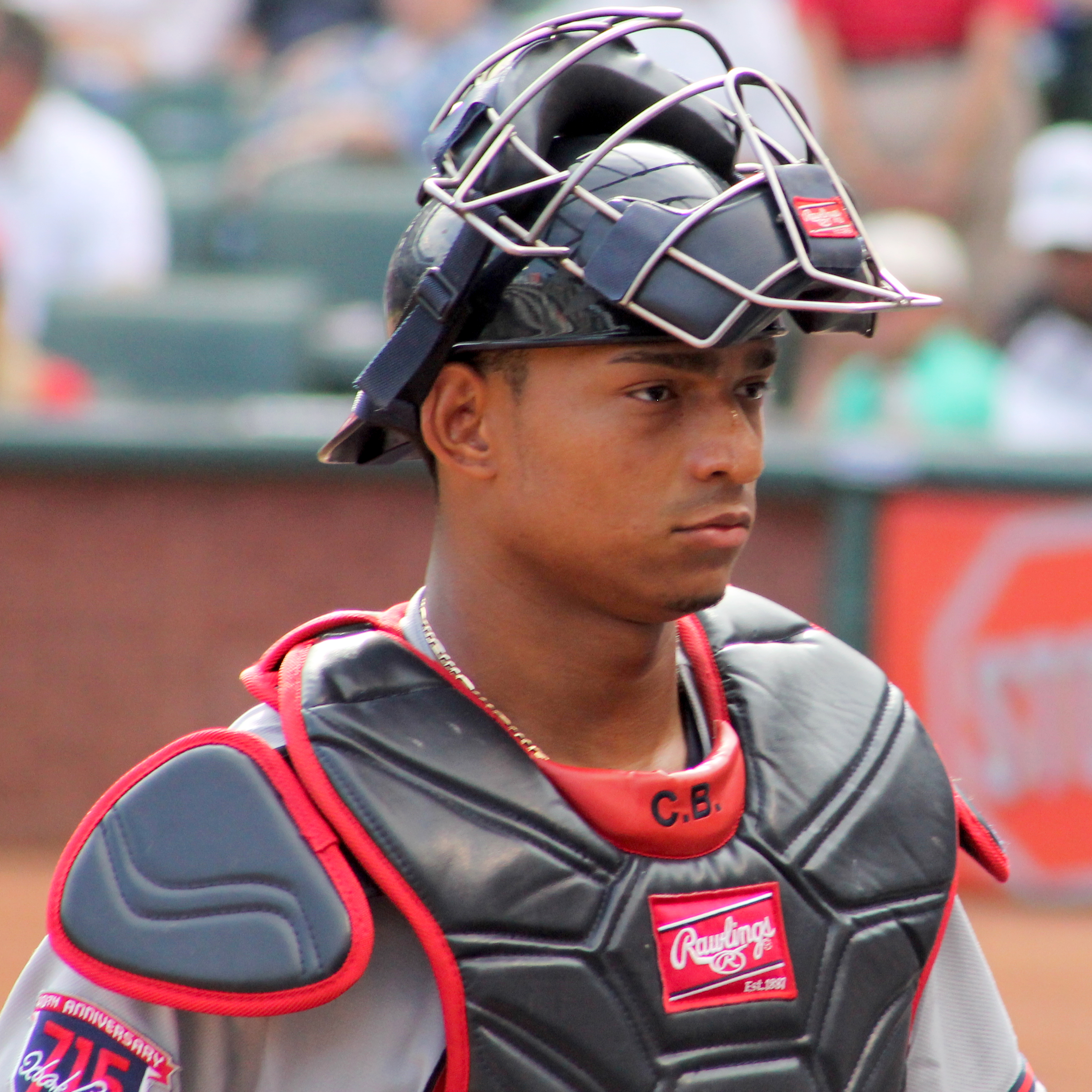
Bethancourt with the Atlanta Braves in 2014

In spring training in 2015, the Braves said Bethancourt would have to be assessed before he would be given the position of primary catcher. On June 6, Bethancourt hit his first career home run in the bottom of the ninth inning, off of Vance Worley, to give the Braves a 5–4 victory over the Pittsburgh Pirates. Bethancourt appeared in 29 games for the Braves in early 2015, batting .208/.231/.297 with a .528 OPS and six passed balls, before being sent to back down to Triple–A Gwinnett on June 15 after he made a series of defensive mistakes and failed to hit. At the time, according to ESPN Stats he was ranked 66th out of 82 qualifiers in catcher's ERA (4.50). He also was ranked third among National League catchers in most passed balls and tied for fourth in errors (3) while playing in only 29 games. He was recalled on August 24. On October 5, Bethancourt underwent knee surgery for a torn meniscus.

=== San Diego Padres ===
On December 10, 2015, Bethancourt was traded to the San Diego Padres for right hander Casey Kelly and Ricardo Rodriguez. After spring training ended in April 2016, Bethancourt was named the backup to starting catcher Derek Norris. Bethancourt made his first career pitching appearance on May 31, a blowout loss against the Seattle Mariners, recording two outs, two walks, and a hit batsmen. He took the mound again on June 14, against the Miami Marlins, picking up his first strikeout as a pitcher, while yielding one hit and one walk in one inning. At the end of the season, Bethancourt returned to his home country to play in the Panamanian Professional Baseball League, where he saw playing time as a pitcher and position player.

On April 1, 2017, the Padres announced that Bethancourt would work primarily as a reliever, while also seeing duties as a catcher, outfielder, and pinch hitter. Bethancourt struggled in four relief appearances, and the Padres outrighted him off of their 40-man roster to the El Paso Chihuahuas of the Triple–A Pacific Coast League, where he continued pitching. He elected free agency on November 6, 2017.

=== Milwaukee Brewers ===
On January 8, 2018, Bethancourt signed a minor league deal with the Milwaukee Brewers. He was assigned to the team's Triple-A affiliate, the Colorado Springs Sky Sox, for the season. On July 11, he played in the Triple-A All-Star Game. Bethancourt elected free agency after the year on November 2.

=== NC Dinos ===
On December 12, 2018, Bethancourt signed a one-year, $1 million deal with the NC Dinos of the KBO League. He was waived on July 3, 2019.

=== Philadelphia Phillies ===
On January 7, 2020, Bethancourt signed a minor league contract with the Philadelphia Phillies organization. He did not play in a game in 2020 due to the cancellation of the minor league season because of the COVID-19 pandemic. Bethancourt became a free agent on November 2.

On January 4, 2021, Bethancourt re-signed with the Phillies on a new minor league contract. Bethancourt joined the Phillies' minor league camp during spring training. On March 28, he was released by the Phillies.

=== Pittsburgh Pirates ===
On May 1, 2021, Bethancourt signed a minor league contract with the Pittsburgh Pirates organization. In 92 games for the Triple–A Indianapolis Indians, he batted .281/.339/.468 with 14 home runs and 60 RBI. Bethancourt elected free agency following the season on November 7.

=== Oakland Athletics ===
On December 3, 2021, Bethancourt signed a minor league deal with the Oakland Athletics. On April 15, 2022, Bethancourt was added to the Athletics roster for their road trip to Toronto as a COVID-19-related substitute. He played three innings at first base. It was the first time Bethancourt had appeared in a Major League Baseball game since the 2017 season. In 56 games for Oakland, he hit .249/.298/.385 with four home runs, 19 RBI, and four stolen bases.

=== Tampa Bay Rays ===
On July 9, 2022, the Athletics traded Bethancourt to the Rays in exchange for Cal Stevenson and Christian Fernandez. On August 23, Bethancourt drove in three runs, including a home run, and pitched a scoreless top of the ninth inning in an 11-1 blowout of the Los Angeles Angels. Bethancourt topped out at 95 mph while giving up two hits and striking out one to close out the game.

In 2023, Bethancourt played in a career–high 104 games for Tampa Bay, hitting .225/.254/.381 with 11 home runs and 33 RBI. On November 4, 2023, Bethancourt was placed on outright waivers by the Rays.

=== Miami Marlins ===
On November 6, 2023, Bethancourt was claimed off waivers by the Cleveland Guardians. On December 10, Bethancourt was traded to the Miami Marlins in exchange for cash considerations. In 38 games for the Marlins, he hit .159/.198/.268 with two home runs and seven RBI. On June 21, Bethancourt was designated for assignment by Miami. He was released by the organization on June 27.

=== Chicago Cubs ===
On July 5, 2024, Bethancourt signed a minor league contract with the Chicago Cubs. After seven games for the Triple–A Iowa Cubs, Bethancourt had his contract selected to the major league roster on July 26. On August 28, Bethancourt became the sixth Cubs catcher to get 7+ RBI in a single game. In 24 total games for Chicago, he slashed .281/.305/.509 with 3 home runs, 15 RBI, and 3 stolen bases. On November 4, Bethancourt was removed from the 40–man roster and sent outright to Iowa, but he rejected the assignment and elected free agency.

=== Toronto Blue Jays ===
On January 22, 2025, Bethancourt signed a minor league contract with the Toronto Blue Jays. In 58 appearances for the Triple-A Buffalo Bisons, he batted .173/.219/.332 with seven home runs, 21 RBI, and two stolen bases. Bethancourt was released by the Blue Jays organization on September 3.

=== Chicago Cubs (second stint) ===
On December 22, 2025, Bethancourt signed a minor league contract with the Chicago Cubs. He made 59 appearances for the Triple–A Iowa Cubs, slashing .262/.309/.466 with 11 home runs, 38 RBI, and five stolen bases. Bethancourt was released by the Cubs organization on July 17, 2026.

=== New York Yankees ===
On July 28, 2026, Bethancourt signed a minor league contract with the New York Yankees. He appeared in eight games for the Triple–A Scranton/Wilkes-Barre RailRiders, batting .333/.407/.708 with three home runs and 7 RBI.

=== Pittsburgh Pirates (second stint) ===
On August 19, 2026, Bethancourt was traded to the Pittsburgh Pirates in exchange for cash considerations. On September 1, the Pirates added Bethancourt to their active roster when rosters expanded. He did not make an appearance for the team prior to being designated for assignment by Pittsburgh on September 4. Bethancourt cleared waivers and was sent outright to the Triple–A Indianapolis Indians on September 7. He elected free agency on November 2.
