= Tim Corcoran (first baseman) =

American baseball player (born 1953)

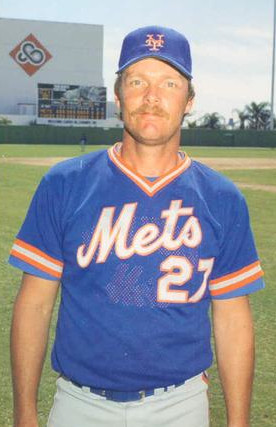
- Corcoran in 1986
- First baseman / Outfielder
- Born: March 19, 1953 (age 73); Glendale, California, U.S.
- Batted: Left Threw: Left

MLB debut
- May 18, 1977, for the Detroit Tigers

Last MLB appearance
- June 6, 1986, for the New York Mets

MLB statistics
- Batting average: .270
- Home runs: 12
- Runs batted in: 128
- Stats at Baseball Reference

Teams
- Detroit Tigers (1977–1980); Minnesota Twins (1981); Philadelphia Phillies (1983–1985); New York Mets (1986)

Timothy Michael Corcoran (born March 19, 1953) is an American former baseball player who played nine years in Major League Baseball (MLB) from 1977 to 1986, principally as a first baseman and right fielder. He played for the Detroit Tigers (1977–1980), Minnesota Twins (1981), Philadelphia Phillies (1983–1985), and New York Mets (1986).

Over the course of his 9-year big league career, Corcoran played at first base (183 games), outfield (174 games), and designated hitter (14 games).

== Early years ==
Corcoran was born in Glendale, California, in 1953. He graduated from Northview High School in Covina, California, and then Mount San Antonio College and California State University, Los Angeles.

== Professional baseball ==
=== Minor leagues ===
Corcoran was overlooked in the amateur draft and signed with the Detroit Tigers in June 1974 as a free agent. He spent several years in the Tigers' minor league organization, playing for the Lakeland Tigers (1974), Bristol Tigers (1974), Montgomery Rebels (1975-1976), and Evansville Triplets (1977). He compiled a .346 batting average at Evansville early in the 1977 season and was promoted to the Tigers in May 1977.

=== Detroit Tigers ===
Corcoran made his major league debut with the Tigers on May 18, 1977. He appeared in 55 games for the Tigers in 1977, including 16 games as a starter in the outfield, and compiled a .282 batting average.

In 1978, he appeared in a career-high 116 games, including 85 games as the Tigers' starting right fielder. He compiled a .265 batting average and a .322 on-base percentage.

Corcoran returned to the minor leagues in 1979, appearing in 87 games for Evansville where he had a .338 batting average and 50 RBIs.

Corcoran returned to the Tigers in 1980. He appeared in 84 games for the 1980 Tigers, posting a .288 batting average, .379 on-base percentage, and .405 slugging percentage.

=== Minnesota Twins ===
In September 1981, Corcoran was sent to the Minnesota Twins as part of an earlier that sent Ron Jackson to the Tigers. Corcoran appeared in 22 games for Minnesota at the end of the 1981 season. He was released by the Twins in March 1982.

=== Philadelphia Phillies ===
Corcoran signed as a free agent with the Philadelphia Phillies in April 1982. He spent the 1982 season and most of the 1983 season in the Phillies' minor league organization. He appeared in 120 games for Oklahoma City in 1982 and 128 games for Portland in 1983. He compiled a .311 batting average and had 93 RBIs in helping Portland win the 1983 Pacific Coast League championship.

In 1984, Corcoran made the Phillies' lineup, appearing in 102 games, including 34 starts at first base and 16 in the outfield. He compiled a .341 batting average and a .440 on-base percentage in 1984. He remained with the Phillies in 1985, appearing in 103 games (including 59 games at first base), but his batting average dropped 127 points to .214. He was released by the Phillies in December 1985. Corcoran said of his release by the Phillies: "It was a heck of a Christmas present. They told me they needed a roster spot. And I'd just gone out and bought a new truck and a house. It was a shock."

=== New York Mets ===
In March 1986, Corcoran signed as a free agent with the New York Mets. He appeared in only six games with the Mets. He appeared in his final major league game on June 9, 1986, after which he was released.

=== Career totals ===
Corcoran’s career MLB statistical totals include 509 games played, a career batting average of .270, and a .349 on-base percentage. Additionally, he complied 373 total bases, 283 hits, 120 runs scored, 128 runs batted in (RBI), 46 doubles, and 12 home runs.

== Later years ==
Corcoran was hired as a scout by the Anaheim Angels in 2000. He was assigned to the "Angels Elite" program in 2002.
