= Jacobs High School =

Harry Darnell Jacobs High School

Location
- 2601 Bunker Hill; Algonquin, Illinois 60102; United States; 42°10′2″N 88°20′28″W

Information
- Type: Public High School
- Established: 1975
- Oversight: Community Unit School District 300
- Principal: Christopher Testone
- Teaching staff: 139.90 (on an FTE basis)
- Grades: 9-12
- Enrollment: 2,062 (2023–2024)
- Student to teacher ratio: 14.74
- Colors: Brown and gold
- Athletics conference: Fox Valley
- Mascot: Eagle
- Nickname: Golden Eagles
- Newspaper: The Talon
- Website: jhs.d300.org

Harry D. Jacobs High School (commonly referred to as Jacobs or HDJ) is a public high school for students in grades 9 through 12 located in Algonquin, Illinois, a northwest suburb of Chicago, serving students from the west half of the Village of Algonquin and its surrounding areas, including Lake in the Hills, Gilberts, some of Sleepy Hollow, some of Carpentersville, and some of West Dundee. The school is located in McHenry County but also draws students from Northern Kane County.

Harry D. Jacobs High School is part of Community Unit School District 300, and one of three high schools serving the district. Feeder schools to Jacobs include Westfield Community School and Dundee Middle School (partial). The school is a member of the Illinois High School Association, Fox Valley Conference.

== Demographics ==
The demographic breakdown of the 2,062 students enrolled in 2023–2024 was:

- White - 58.2%
- Hispanic - 24.6%
- Asian - 8.2%
- Black - 4.7%
- Native American/Alaskan - 0.2%
- Native Hawaiian/Pacific Islander - 0.2%
- Multiracial - 3.7%

34.8% of students were eligible for free or reduced-price lunches.

== Athletics and Activities ==
Jacobs High School offers the following programs:

Athletics

- Girls: Basketball, Bowling, Cheerleading (Football Season), Cheerleading (Competitive Season), Cross Country, Dance (Football Season), Dance (Competitive Season), Golf, Lacrosse, Soccer, Softball, Swimming, Tennis, Track & Field, and Volleyball
- Boys: Baseball, Basketball, Cross Country, Football, Golf, Lacrosse, Soccer, Swimming, Tennis, Track & Field, and Wrestling

== Notable alumni ==
- Doug Feldmann, author and Major League Baseball scout and official scorer
- Ryan Hartman, AHL/NHL hockey player
- Evan Jager, professional runner, Olympic and world championships medalist
- Adam Neylon, Wisconsin legislator and businessman
- Cameron Krutwig, Basketball player
- Matthew Kaminski, organist for the Atlanta Braves
- Loren Strickland, NFL safety for the Detroit Lions
