= Baseball Dynasties =

2000 book by Rob Neyer and Eddie Epstein

- Author: Rob Neyer, Eddie Epstein
- Publication date: April 2000
- ISBN: 9780393320084

Baseball Dynasties: The Greatest Teams of All Time is a non-fiction baseball book, co-written by Rob Neyer and Eddie Epstein. It was published in April 2000 by W. W. Norton & Company.

== Contents ==
15 different MLB "dynasties" (defined as teams with exceptional three-year runs) are profiled in separate chapters, all with league records, written accounts of the season, and other related baseball facts in sidebars.

At the end, the clubs are ranked, and a conclusion is reached that the 1939 New York Yankees are the greatest team of all time.

The two authors acknowledged that their work is heavily influenced by baseball statistician Bill James.
