= Roger McDowell =

American baseball player (born 1960)

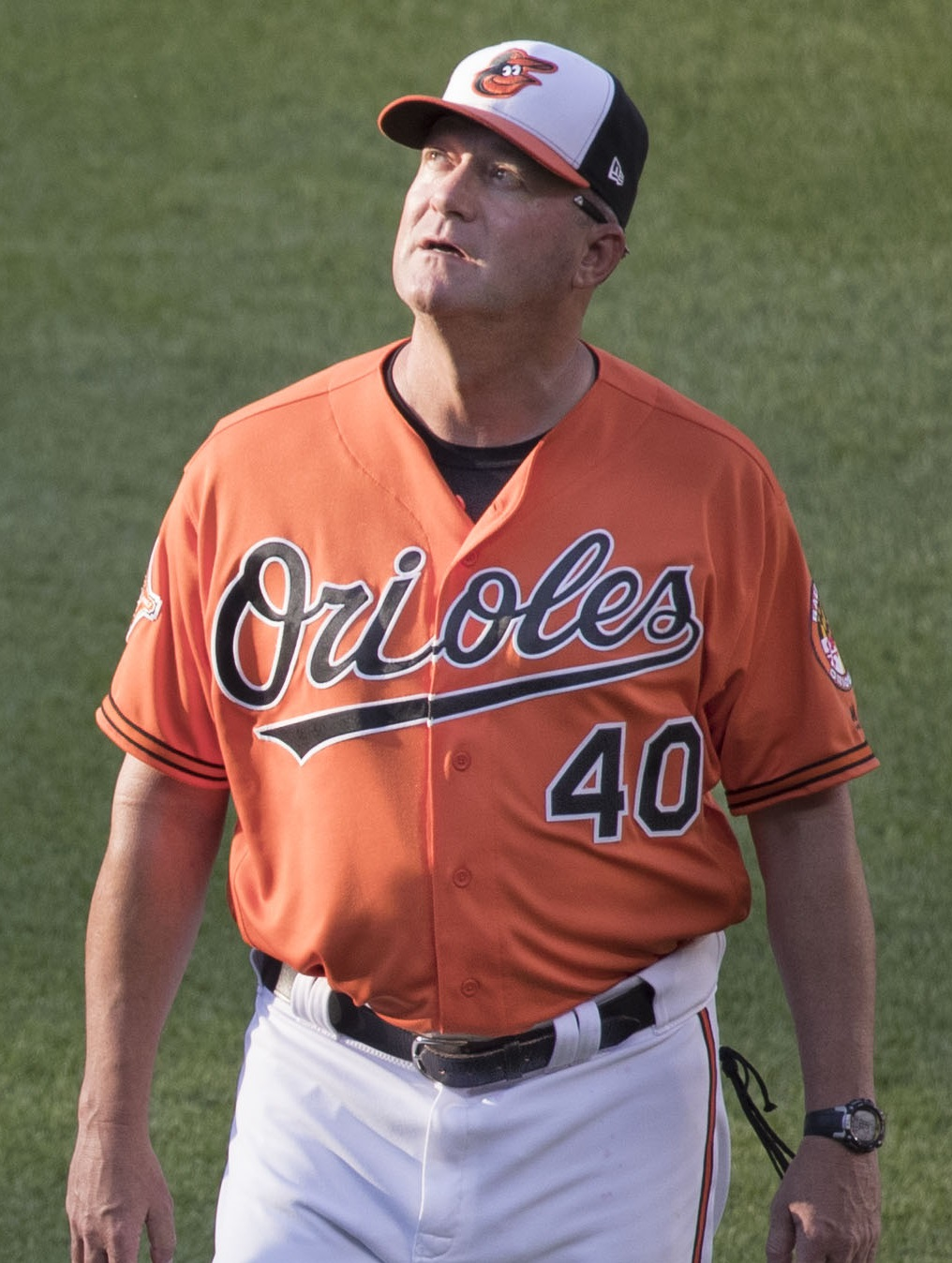
- McDowell with the Baltimore Orioles
- Pitcher
- Born: December 21, 1960 (age 65); Cincinnati, Ohio, U.S.
- Batted: Right Threw: Right

MLB debut
- April 11, 1985, for the New York Mets

Last MLB appearance
- August 14, 1996, for the Baltimore Orioles

MLB statistics
- Win–loss record: 70–70
- Earned run average: 3.30
- Strikeouts: 524
- Saves: 159
- Stats at Baseball Reference

Teams
- As player: New York Mets (1985–1989); Philadelphia Phillies (1989–1991); Los Angeles Dodgers (1991–1994); Texas Rangers (1995); Baltimore Orioles (1996); As coach: Atlanta Braves (2006–2016); Baltimore Orioles (2017–2018)

Career highlights and awards
- World Series champion (1986)

Roger Alan McDowell (born December 21, 1960) is an American former professional baseball right-handed relief pitcher who played in Major League Baseball from 1985 to 1996. He played for the New York Mets, Philadelphia Phillies and Los Angeles Dodgers in the National League and the Texas Rangers and Baltimore Orioles of the American League. McDowell was a key component in the 1986 World Series champion New York Mets and was the winning pitcher in the deciding Game 7. His major league record of decisions was 70 wins and 70 losses. McDowell served as the Atlanta Braves pitching coach from 2006 to 2016. McDowell's family is of Scottish descent.

== Professional career ==
=== New York Mets (1985–89) ===
Roger McDowell was born in Cincinnati, Ohio, graduated from Colerain High School and was drafted by the Mets in the third round of the 1982 Major League Baseball draft from Bowling Green State University. He spent 1982 in the A-level minor leagues and spent 1983 with the AA Jackson Mets, both as a starting pitcher. In 1984, McDowell was at Jackson when he suffered an elbow injury which limited him to only three games. As a result of the injury, he became a relief pitcher and developed a fantastic sinker ball that became the main weapon in his arsenal for his entire career.

McDowell debuted in the majors in 1985. He was impressive as both a middle relief pitcher and as a closer, splitting the duties with Jesse Orosco. Orosco was a lefty and a strikeout threat while McDowell was a righty and a groundball specialist, making them a challenging pair late in games. McDowell posted a 2.83 earned run average. The Mets continued on an upward surge that saw them barely miss their first postseason in over a decade. McDowell averaged more than two innings pitched per appearance in his rookie season and even logged the only two games started of his career. He never again averaged more than two innings per appearance and, through most of his career, averaged less than one-and-a-half inning, as became customary throughout the majors.

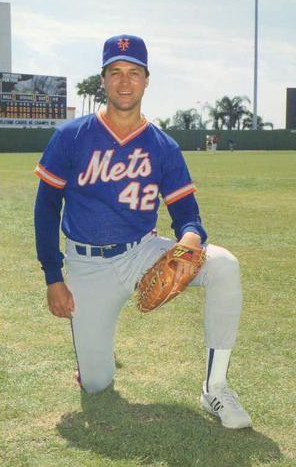
McDowell in 1986

In 1986, McDowell was again impressive and was part of a strong core of Mets farm-hands — players that had come up through the minor leagues in the Mets' system — which, together with a few fiery veterans, helped the Mets win the 1986 World Series. McDowell was involved in many close games, posting an amazing 23 pitching decisions despite never starting a game. His 14–9 record, which included winning his first seven decisions, and 3.02 ERA resulted in five points in the voting for National League MVP. McDowell was fantastic in the 1986 National League Championship Series, allowing a single hit in seven innings pitched including five innings in the famous sixteen-inning Game 6. He went on to pitch in five of the seven games of the World Series. Although Sid Fernandez gets much deserved recognition for holding the Boston Red Sox silent in the middle innings of Game 7, McDowell was credited with the win by pitching an important scoreless seventh inning before the Mets broke the tie in the bottom of the inning.

1987 was McDowell's first down year, with an ERA over four after missing the first six weeks of the season with a hernia. He did manage to post a career-high 25 saves but his most infamous game occurred on September 11, 1987 when he gave up a game-tying 9th inning two-run home run to the St. Louis Cardinals' Terry Pendleton. The Cardinals won the game the following inning. With the Cardinals and Mets in the midst of a close division race, many credited the home run with ending the Mets' chances for a repeat championship.

After the season, Jesse Orosco was traded to the Los Angeles Dodgers and, in 1988, McDowell improved his ERA back down to 2.63 and moved into third place on the Mets' all-time save list behind Orosco and Tug McGraw. The lefty-righty closer platoon system was maintained with McDowell and Randy Myers. The Mets won 100 games and were pitted against Orosco and the Dodgers in the 1988 National League Championship Series. In Game 4, the Mets had a chance to take a commanding 3–1 series lead but Mike Scioscia tied the game with a 2-run shot off Dwight Gooden in the 9th inning. McDowell would later give up the game-winning home run to Kirk Gibson in the 12th inning. Overall, McDowell gave up a run in three of his four games. The favored Mets lost in seven games in their last postseason for over a decade. It also spelled the last postseason appearance of the 27-year-old McDowell's career.

=== Philadelphia Phillies (1989–91) ===
In 1989, McDowell pitched about average for the Mets before the Mets blundered in mid-June by trading him and Lenny Dykstra to the Phillies for potential superstar Juan Samuel. Samuel proved to be a huge disappointment for the Mets, batting .228 before the Mets re-traded him after the season, and he never regained the combination of speed and power he had shown in his few years with the Phillies. Dykstra, meanwhile, became a fixture for the Phillies, twice finishing in the top ten in MVP voting including a second-place finish in 1993 when he led the Phils to the 1993 World Series. McDowell was untouchable in his first partial season with Philadelphia, compiling a microscopic 1.11 ERA in 44 games for the last-place 1989 Phillies.

McDowell was rewarded with his first million-dollar contract for 1990 but was only average as the Phillies finished below .500. In 1991, McDowell improved for the Phillies but was traded at the trading deadline to the Dodgers for two minor leaguers. Neither minor leaguer accomplished much in Philadelphia but the Phillies shocked the National League by winning the pennant two years later.

=== Los Angeles Dodgers (1991–94) ===
McDowell was again impressive after a mid-season trade with a 2.55 ERA. Similar to 1990, however, he was less impressive in the first full season after a trade and his ERA ballooned to over four in 1992, leading the league in relief losses and lowest save percentage. The Dodgers finished with their worst winning percentage in eighty years and their only last-place finish of the 20th century.

After his poor 1992, McDowell re-signed with the Dodgers for 1993, but for only $1.35 million as opposed to the $2.2 million he was paid for 1992. He responded with a 2.25 ERA which was the last time his season ERA was below 4.00. The Dodgers defense was a factor for McDowell as nearly half of the runs he allowed were unearned in 1993. The Dodgers rose from last in 1992 to .500 in 1993 to first place in 1994 when the 1994 Major League Baseball strike prematurely ended the season. The unearned runs of 1993 were replaced by earned runs in 1994 and McDowell's ERA skyrocketed to a career-worst 5.23. He was granted free agency after the season and was signed by the Texas Rangers shortly before the strike ended in April 1995.

=== American League (1995–96) ===
In his first year in the American League, the 34-year-old McDowell fit in well and was given the most innings he'd pitched since 1991. He also pitched in the second-highest number of games in the American League. While his 4.02 ERA was poor compared to his career average, it was far better than the 4.67 A.L. average for 1995. Nearing his 35th birthday, the Rangers granted him free agency and he signed on with the Orioles for 1996. His ERA was again high but better than the league average in 1996 but shoulder surgery ended his season in mid-August. After the season, he was again a free agent before the Chicago White Sox signed him for the 1997 season. Unfortunately for McDowell, he had two more shoulder surgeries wiping out the whole season. In 1998, he attended spring training with Chicago but retired before the season began at age 37.

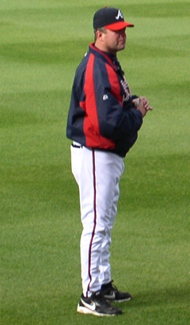
McDowell as pitching coach for the Braves in 2007

== Prankster reputation ==
While McDowell was a major league-level pitcher, he was notorious in the league and among fans as a prankster who would light firecrackers in the dugout. He also could wrap a wad of chewing gum around a cigarette, then secretly place the contraption on the heels of unsuspecting teammates' cleats. This is known as the hot foot.

In 1992, McDowell made a cameo appearance in a two-part episode of Seinfeld called "The Boyfriend". The episode starred McDowell's ex-teammate, Keith Hernandez, and featured McDowell as a grassy knoll-type figure spitting on Cosmo Kramer and Newman during a Zapruder film parody after Kramer and Newman insulted Hernandez.

McDowell made several appearances on the softball edition of the MTV series MTV Rock N' Jock, often donning humorous costumes such as kilts and wigs.

== Post-retirement and coaching ==
McDowell was hired as the pitching coach of the Dodgers' single-A minor league South Georgia Waves for 2002 and 2003. He was promoted to the AAA Las Vegas 51s for 2004 and 2005.

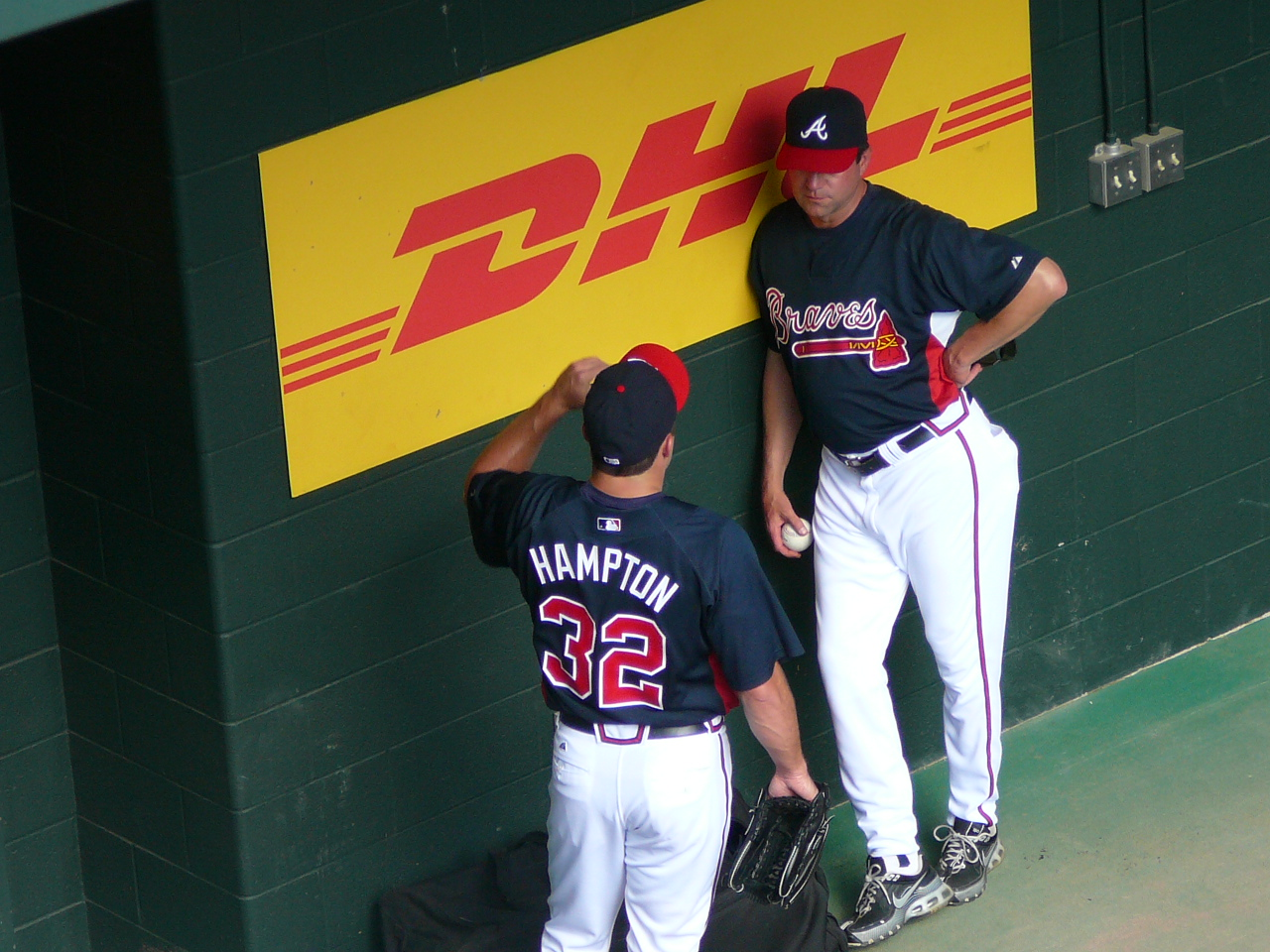
McDowell (right) with Braves pitcher Mike Hampton in 2008.

On October 29, 2005, McDowell was hired to replace Leo Mazzone as the pitching coach of the Atlanta Braves after Mazzone became the coach for the Baltimore Orioles.

Fredi Gonzalez was named Braves manager for the 2011 season after Bobby Cox's retirement. McDowell was kept on as the pitching coach. His contract was not renewed following the end of the 2016 season.

In 2011 McDowell was suspended without pay for two weeks after hurling homophobic slurs and making sexual gestures at three Giants fans. When a father with his young daughters called McDowell out for his behavior, McDowell threatened to knock the man's teeth out with the baseball bat. https://www.nbcnewyork.com/news/local/braves-suspend-roger-mcdowell-over-alleged-homophobic-comments/1924786/

The Baltimore Orioles named McDowell their major league pitching coach on November 22, 2016.

McDowell and his wife, Gloria, have two daughters. His eldest, Amanda, attended New York University. His youngest daughter, Rachel, attended Auburn University.

In March 2026, McDowell released his autobiography, “Hot Foot,” co-authored with Doug Feldmann.

Sporting positions
Preceded by Leo Mazzone	Atlanta Braves pitching coach 2006–2016 (Dave Wallace served as interim pitching coach, April 29–May 14, 2011)	Succeeded by Chuck Hernandez
Preceded by Dave Wallace	Baltimore Orioles pitching coach 2017–2018	Succeeded by Doug Brocail
