= Loren Strickland =

American football player (born 2000)

Profile
- Position: Safety

Personal information
- Born: May 31, 2000 (age 26); Carpentersville, Illinois, U.S.
- Listed height: 5 ft 10 in (1.78 m)
- Listed weight: 202 lb (92 kg)

Career information
- High school: Jacobs (Algonquin, Illinois)
- College: Indianapolis (2018–2021); Ball State (2022–2023)
- NFL draft: 2024: undrafted

Career history
- Detroit Lions (2024–2025)

Awards and highlights
- First-team All-GLVC (2019)

Career NFL statistics as of 2025
- Total tackles: 2
- Stats at Pro Football Reference

Loren Strickland (born May 31, 2000) is an American professional football safety. He played college football for the Indianapolis Greyhounds and Ball State Cardinals and signed with the Lions as an undrafted free agent in 2024.

== Early life ==
Strickland was born on May 31, 2000, in Carpentersville, Illinois. He attended Jacobs High School in Algonquin, where he won 10 varsity letters in three sports – track and field, football and wrestling. In football, he played as a running back, linebacker and safety, being selected first-team all-conference and all-area. He graduated from Jacobs in 2018 and committed to play college football for the NCAA Division II Indianapolis Greyhounds (UIndy).

== College career ==
Strickland redshirted as a freshman at Indianapolis in 2018, then won a starting job as a redshirt freshman in 2019. He started the final 10 games of the 2019 season and was named first-team All-Great Lakes Valley Conference (GLVC) after totaling 46 tackles and four pass breakups. He appeared in one game during the COVID-19-shortened 2020–21 season and served as a team captain in 2021, recording 33 tackles and a team-leading 10 pass breakups. He received a finance degree from UIndy in December 2021. Strickland transferred to the Ball State Cardinals, playing 12 games as a backup in the 2022 season while making 19 tackles. As a senior in 2023, he appeared in all 12 games, five as a starter, and made 31 tackles with two tackles-for-loss (TFLs).

== Professional career ==
Pre-draft measurables
Height	Weight	Arm length	Hand span	Wingspan	40-yard dash	10-yard split	20-yard split	20-yard shuttle	Three-cone drill	Vertical jump	Broad jump	Bench press
5 ft 9 1/8 in (1.76 m)	199 lb (90 kg)	30 1/2 in (0.77 m)	9 3/4 in (0.25 m)	6 ft 0 5/8 in (1.84 m)	4.56 s	1.58 s	2.58 s	4.40 s	6.95 s	38.0 in (0.97 m)	10 ft 5 in (3.18 m)	18 reps
All values from Pro Day

After going unselected in the 2024 NFL draft, Strickland signed with the Detroit Lions as an undrafted free agent. He made the team's initial 53-man roster for the 2024 season, being the first alumnus of UIndy to make an NFL team in the modern era. He was waived on December 4, 2024, and re-signed to the practice squad. Strickland signed a reserve/future contract with Detroit on January 20, 2025.

Strickland was waived by the Lions on August 26, 2025 as part of final roster cuts, and re-signed to the practice squad. On October 1, he was signed to the active roster. On October 11, Strickland was waived by the Lions and was subsequently re-signed to the practice squad five days later. He signed a reserve/future contract with Detroit on January 5, 2026.

On August 16, 2026, Strickland was waived by the Lions and reverted to injured reserve the next day. He was released by Detroit on August 19.
