= Catcher's ERA =

Baseball statistic

Catcher's ERA (CERA) in baseball statistics is the earned run average of the pitchers pitching when the catcher in question is catching. Its primary purpose is to measure a catcher's game-calling, rather than his effect on the opposing team's running game. Craig Wright first described the concept of CERA in his 1989 book The Diamond Appraised. With it, Wright developed a method of determining a catcher's effect on a team's pitching staff by comparing pitchers' performance when playing with different catchers.

Baseball Prospectus writer Keith Woolner has written that "catcher game-calling isn't a statistically significant skill" after doing statistical analysis of catcher performance. Sabermetrician Bill James also performed research into CERA, finding that while it is possible that catchers may have a significant effect on a pitching staff, there is too much yearly variation in CERA for it to be a reliable indicator of ability. James used simulations of catchers with assigned defensive values to directly compare CERAs, which influenced Woolner to perform similar simulations but instead using weighted events to calculate pitchers' runs per plate appearance. Through this, Woolner concluded that even if catchers do have an effect on pitchers' abilities to prevent runs, it is undetectable and thus has no practical usage. He also stated that "the hypothesis most consistent with the available facts appears to be that catchers do not have a significant effect on pitcher performance".

== See also ==
- Earned run
- Earned run average
