= Stan Fansler =

American baseball player (born 1965)

- Pitcher
- Born: February 12, 1965 (age 61); Elkins, West Virginia
- Batted: Right Threw: Right

MLB debut
- September 6, 1986, for the Pittsburgh Pirates

Last MLB appearance
- October 4, 1986, for the Pittsburgh Pirates

MLB statistics
- Win–loss record: 0–3
- Earned run average: 3.75
- Strikeouts: 13
- Stats at Baseball Reference

Teams
- Pittsburgh Pirates (1986)

Stanley Robert Fansler (born February 12, 1965) is an American former professional baseball pitcher.

== Early life and amateur career ==
Fansler was born in 1965 to Elkins, West Virginia to Lonnis and Carol Anne Fansler. His father served in the United States Air Force and for thirty years in the United States Forest Service. Fansler was one of three brothers.

Fansler attended Elkins High School in Elkins where he played baseball and was named to the ABCA/Rawlings High School All-America Third Team in 1983.

== Professional career ==
Fansler was selected by the Pittsburgh Pirates in the second round of the 1983 Major League Baseball draft and became the first player selected from West Virginia in the second or first round of the main phase of the draft. He began his professional career in the New York–Penn League with the Watertown Pirates, accumulating an earned run average (ERA) of 8.05 in his age-18 season. In the following season in Watertown, however, he lowered that number by more than three quarters; his 2.01 ERA and 78 strikeouts both led the Pirates. Fansler moved relatively quickly through the minors. By the time he reached Triple-A with the Hawaii Islanders for the first time in 1985, he was 5.7 years younger than the average player in the Pacific Coast League.

On or about August 29, 1986, the Pittsburgh Pirates promoted Fansler to the Major Leagues for the first time in his career alongside Sammy Khalifa, Bob Patterson and Mike Brown. He made his Major League debut on September 6, 1986. He was the starting pitcher that night for the Pirates against the Atlanta Braves at Atlanta-Fulton County Stadium and surrendered four earned runs in just four innings pitched. His best start of the season according to game score came on September 18 against the Expos in Montreal; he went six innings for the first time in his career and allowed only one run. On October 4, Fansler recorded the only hit in his Major League career, a third-inning single off of Bob Ojeda of the eventual World Series champion New York Mets. It would turn out to be the final game of his Major League career.

Fansler underwent multiple surgeries on his rotator cuff after his brief MLB stint, with the first coming in 1987. In 1990, he suffered an ankle injury mid-season and also pitched through bursitis in his shoulder. His final season as a player came in the minors in 1994, after which he coached in the Montreal Expos and Texas Rangers farm systems.

== Personal life ==
Fansler left baseball after having children with his wife, who he had married in 1991.

In 2006, Fansler was living in Beckley, West Virginia and working making mining equipment with his father-in-law. In 2020, Fansler's son, Hunter, played college baseball for Marshall University.
