= Rob Neyer =

American baseball writer

- Born: October 22, 1965 (age 61); Columbia, Missouri, U.S.
- Education: University of Kansas
- Occupation: Sportswriter
- Years active: 1996–present
- Employer: SB Nation (February 2011 - January 2014)

Rob Neyer (born October 22, 1965) is an American baseball writer known for his use of statistical analysis or sabermetrics. He started his career working for Bill James and STATS and then joined ESPN.com as a columnist and blogger from 1996 to 2011. He was National Baseball Editor for SB Nation from 2011 to 2014, and Senior Baseball Editor for FoxSports.com in 2015 and 2016.

== Biography ==
Rob Neyer lived in the Kansas City area as a child and attended the University of Kansas After dropping out of college, he was soon hired as a research assistant by Bill James. After four years with James, Neyer took a job at STATS, before joining ESPNet SportsZone, ESPN.com's forerunner, in 1996. Since May 2018, Neyer has served as Commissioner of the West Coast League, a collegiate summer baseball league based in the Pacific Northwest.

He lives in Portland, Oregon.

== Writing career ==
Neyer wrote for ESPN for 15 years from 1996 to January 2011. He joined SB Nation as its National Baseball Editor in February 2011 and worked there for three years. From February 2014 to January 2016, he was part of Fox Sports' baseball writing team. Within the baseball writing community, Neyer is a member of the Baseball Writers' Association of America and the voting panel for the Fielding Bible Awards.

He is the author or co-author of seven books: Baseball Dynasties (2000) with Eddie Epstein, Feeding the Green Monster (2001), Rob Neyer's Big Book of Baseball Lineups (2003), The Neyer/James Guide to Pitchers (2004) with Bill James, Rob Neyer's Big Book of Baseball Blunders (2006), Rob Neyer's Big Book of Baseball Legends (2008), and Power Ball: Anatomy of a Modern Baseball Game, which won the 2018 CASEY Award for Best Baseball Book of the Year. His baseball writing is known for its use of historical and statistical analysis.
