= Doug Feldmann =

American writer (born 1970)

Doug Feldmann (born 1970) is an American author of fifteen books, focusing mainly upon baseball history and the sport's sociological impact on urban and small-town America. His work has been recognized in multiple nominations for the Casey Award and the Seymour Medal from the Society for American Baseball Research. He is a professor in the College of Education at Northern Kentucky University, an official scorer for Major League Baseball in Cincinnati, and a former scout for the Cincinnati Reds, Seattle Mariners, and San Diego Padres. He completed his Ph.D. in Curriculum Studies at Indiana University (1999), his master's degree in Secondary Education at Rockford University (1995), and his bachelor's degree in English and History at Northern Illinois University (1992) where he was an outfielder on the baseball team and a walk-on punter on the football team.

== Publications ==
- (With Roger McDowell) Hot Foot: My Upside-Down Life and Hijinx with the 1986 World Champion New York Mets. Chicago: Triumph Books (2026)
- One More for the White Rat: The 1987 St. Louis Cardinals Chase the Pennant. Lincoln, NE: The University of Nebraska Press (2025)
- The Dean of Clinton County. Sikeston, MO: Acclaim Press (2022)
- A View from Two Benches: Bob Thomas in Football and the Law. Ithaca, NY: Cornell University Press (2020)
- Whitey Herzog Builds a Winner: The St. Louis Cardinals, 1979-1982. Jefferson, NC: McFarland (2018)
- Keith Magnuson: The Life and Times of a Beloved Blackhawk. Chicago: Triumph Books (2013)
- Gibson’s Last Stand: The Rise, Fall, and Near-Misses of the St. Louis Cardinals, 1969-1975. Columbia, MO: University of Missouri Press (2011)
- St. Louis Cardinals: Past and Present. Minneapolis: Voyageur Press (2009)
- The 1976 Cincinnati Reds. McFarland (2009)
- El Birdos: The 1967 and 1968 St. Louis Cardinals. McFarland (2007)
- Miracle Collapse: The 1969 Chicago Cubs. Lincoln, NE: The University of Nebraska Press (2006)
- September Streak: The 1935 Chicago Cubs. McFarland (2003)
- Curriculum and the American Rural School. Lanham, MD: University Press of America (2003)
- Fleeter than Birds: The 1985 St. Louis Cardinals and Small-Ball’s Last Hurrah. McFarland (2002)
- Dizzy and the Gas House Gang: The 1934 St. Louis Cardinals and Depression-Era Baseball. McFarland (2000)
