= Eddie Epstein =

Eddie Epstein is one of the pioneers of the modern age of baseball analysis, or sabermetrics. He was Director of Research and Statistics for the Baltimore Orioles from 1988 to 1994 and Director of Baseball Operations for the San Diego Padres from 1995 to 1999. He was President of his own baseball consulting company, EBC, Inc., from 2000 to 2011 and in that role consulted on baseball operations and player personnel matters for several major league teams, including the Cleveland Indians, Oakland A's, and Tampa Bay Rays. He wrote the 1995 STATS Minor League Scouting Notebook, co-authored Baseball Dynasties with Rob Neyer, and wrote Dominance - the subject of which was the greatest NFL teams since 1950. The Wall Street Journal review of Dominance claimed that the book was, "Without a doubt the best book on pro football analysis ever written."

== Baltimore Orioles and historical baseball records ==
While serving as director of research and statistics for the Baltimore Orioles, Epstein used historical game information in his statistical analysis of player performance, including research relevant to salary arbitration. The Orioles' public-relations department, led by Bob Brown, had preserved a large collection of the club's game scoresheets.

In 1988, baseball statistician Pete Palmer connected Epstein with David W. Smith, who was seeking historical play-by-play records for the project that became Retrosheet. Epstein conveyed Smith's request to Orioles public-relations staff, including Rick Vaughn. With Brown's approval, Smith borrowed and copied approximately 30 years of Orioles scorebooks after the 1988 season. The acquisition added roughly 4,000 games to Smith's growing collection and became an important early source for Retrosheet.
