= 1986 Houston Astros season =

25th season in Major League Baseball for the Houston Astros

1986 Houston Astros
- National League West champions
- League: National League
- Division: West
- Ballpark: The Astrodome
- City: Houston, Texas
- Record: 96–66 (.593)
- Divisional place: 1st
- Owners: John McMullen
- General managers: Dick Wagner
- Managers: Hal Lanier
- Television: KTXH–TV 20 (Gene Elston, Milo Hamilton, Larry Dierker); HSE (Gene Elston, Milo Hamilton, Larry Dierker, Bill Worrell)
- Radio: KTRH–AM 740 (Gene Elston, Milo Hamilton, Larry Dierker, Jerry Trupiano)

The 1986 Houston Astros season was the 25th season for the Major League Baseball (MLB) franchise located in Houston, Texas, their 22nd as the Astros, 25th in the National League (NL), 18th in the NL West division, and 22nd at The Astrodome. The Astros entered the season as having tied for third place in the NL West, with an 83–79 record and 12 games behind the division-champion Los Angeles Dodgers.

The 1986, season was the 1st for Hal Lanier as manager, the 10th in Astros' franchise history, succeeding Bob Lillis. On April 8, pitcher Nolan Ryan made his third Opening Day start for the Astros, who hosted the San Francisco Giants but were defeated, 8–3. During the amateur draft, the Astros selected pitcher Ryan Bowen in the first round at 13th overall, outfielder Tuffy Rhodes in the third round, and outfielder Eric Anthony in the 34th round.

The Astros hosted the MLB All-Star Game at The Astrodome for the second time, and first time since 1968. Right fielder Kevin Bass, first baseman Glenn Davis, and pitchers Mike Scott and Dave Smith each represented the Astros at the All-Star Game and played for the National League. (Note: It was the first time since 1979 that the Astros sent as many as four representatives to the MLB All-Star Game.) On August 27, Nolan Ryan earned his 250th career win.

On September 25, Scott hurled the eighth no-hitter in franchise history to lead a 2–0 win over the San Francisco Giants, which simultaneously clinched the NL West division title. This was the first no-hitter thrown that secured a playoff spot in the major leagues since 1951. Scott led the National League in numerous categories, including a 2.22 earned run average (ERA), 306 strikeouts, 5.9 hits per nine innings, and 275 1/3 innings pitched, among others, and posted an 18–10 win–loss record (W–L).

The Astros concluded their regular season with a 96–66 record. For the third time in franchise history, Houston won the NL West division, also their third playoff appearance, all over the past seven seasons. At the time, the 96 wins set a new franchise record, surpassing their 93–69 mark in 1980, and stood until their first 100-win season in 1998. This was their final division title as members of the National League West and final playoff appearance until 1997. The Astros played the New York Mets in the National League Championship Series (NLCS), only to be defeated 4 games to 2, while the Mets were the eventual World Series champions. Scott, who pitched two complete games and allowed just 1 run for an 0.50 ERA, became the first NLCS Most Valuable Player Award (MVP) winner of the losing team.

Following the season, Scott became the first-ever Cy Young Award winner for Houston, won The Sporting News NL Pitcher of the Year, (Note: From its inception in 1944 until 2012, The Sporting News recognized one pitcher each from the NL and the American League (AL) for this award. Beginning in 2013, the award was redesignated to recognize one starting pitcher and relief pitcher from each league.) Davis won his first career Silver Slugger Award, and Lanier was recognized as Manager of the Year by each of the Associated Press (AP), BBWAA (Note: Recognized one Manager of the Year for each of the NL and the American League (AL).) and The Sporting News. (Note: Beginning in 1986, The Sporting News presented one award each in both the NL and the American League (AL). From 1938–1985, one award had been presented for all of MLB.)

== Offseason ==
Summary

On November 5, 1985, the Astros announced the hiring of Hal Lanier as manager for his first occasion to assume the role at the major league level, replacing Bob Lillis. Lanier was a former major league infielder and had subsequently coached in the St. Louis Cardinals' minor league system, including winning The Sporting News Minor League Manager of the Year Award in 1980, prior to coaching for the Cardinals at the major league level. Lanier also announced that he would select New York Yankees Hall of Fame catcher Yogi Berra to the coaching staff. Other candidates that general manager Dick Wagner had considered included Joe Torre, Dave Bristol, Billy Gardner, and Jim Leyland.

Prior to the 1986, season, Sports Illustrated released a ranking of all major league teams and had assessed the Astros as the 22nd best team in the league.

Transactions

- November 13, 1985: Mike Richardt was released by the Astros.

== Regular season ==
=== Summary ===
==== April—May ====
Opening Day starting lineup
| Uniform | Player | Position |
|---|---|---|
| 9 | Eric Bullock | Left fielder |
| 19 | Bill Doran | Second baseman |
| 29 | Denny Walling | Third baseman |
| 27 | Glenn Davis | First baseman |
| 6 | Mark Bailey | Catcher |
| 17 | Kevin Bass | Right fielder |
| 30 | Tony Walker (Note: Major league debut.) | Center fielder |
| 10 | Dickie Thon | Shortstop |
| 34 | Nolan Ryan | Pitcher |
Venue: Astrodome • San Francisco 8, Houston 3 Sources:

The Astros hosted the San Francisco Giants for Opening Day on April 8, as power pitcher Nolan Ryan made his third Opening Day start for Houston. Top prospect Will Clark, a 1984 Olympian and Golden Spikes Award winner, made his major league debut for the Giants at first base on Opening Day. During his first plate appearance, Clark deposited the first offering from Ryan, a shoulder-high fastball, 420 feet (130 m) into the center field bleachers for his first major league home run. The Astros rebounded in the bottom of the first. With Bill Doran aboard, Glenn Davis launched a home run off Giants right-hander Mike Krukow. In the second, Kevin Bass tripled and scored on Dickie Thon's squeeze bunt. Ryan recouped some vengeance on Clark in the third via a called third strike. Jeffrey Leonard took Ryan deep for a solo home run in the fourth, and during the following frame, San Francisco tied the score when Robby Thompson—also making his major-league debut—singled in José Uribe. Astros manager Hal Lanier, another debutante in his role, pulled Ryan after loading the bases in the top of the seventh, replacing him with Jeff Calhoun. Candy Maldonado greeted Calhoun with a bases-clearing triple, putting the Giants ahead to stay, 6–3. They scored twice more for an easy 8–3 triumph over Houston. Ryan took the loss with six runs surrendered over 6 1/3 frames, while Krukow claimed the victory.

Craig Reynolds golfed his third career grand slam on April 12, and his only grand slam in capacity as a pinch hitter. The drive came in bottom of the sixth with the Astros trailing the Atlanta Braves, 2–0. The blast supplied all the scoring to pave the way for a 4–3 Astros win and Nolan Ryan's (1–1) first victory of the season. Ryan tossed seven innings with two runs, one earned, surrendered.

On his way to a 4–0 start to the season, on May 2, Bob Knepper led the club to a 6–1 victory over the Montreal Expos, with six innings of one-run ball. Kevin Bass doubled, Reynolds tripled, and José Cruz collected two hits and two runs batted in (RBI). The Astros improved to 15–6.

After seven starts through May 4, starter Mike Scott had turned in a 3–2 win–loss record (W–L record) with a 4.03 earned run average (ERA). On the cusp of one of the most dramatic career transformations and dominant pitching performances of the season, Scott, in his next start, surrendered just one earned run over seven innings to the Pittsburgh Pirates. This outing initiated an Astros-record 20 consecutive quality starts, which surpassed the 15 set by Don Wilson in 1971, and remained until passed by Framber Valdez on August 24, 2022.

Mike Scott struck out 10 on May 25, his first career contest yielding double-figures in strikeouts. (Note: Mike Scott, for single games, in the regular season, requiring strikeouts ≥ 10, sorted by ascending date.) Having surrendered six hits and four walks, Scott departed after eight frames with Houston and the Chicago Cubs tied, 1–1. In the top of the 11th, catcher Mark Bailey doubled home Phil Garner and Craig Reynolds off Lee Smith (2–4) for the game-winning run. Charlie Kerfeld (4–1) retired the Cubs in order in each of the ninth and tenth innings to earn the win, while Dave Smith tossed a perfect 11th for the save (11).

==== June—early July ====
Phil Garner connected for both his 100th career home run and third grand slam on the same play on June 14, to lead a 7–3 win over the San Francisco Giants. Garner hit the grand slam in the bottom of the seventh inning off Jeff Robinson and also drew two walks. Jim Deshaies (3–2) tossed five innings to earn the win for Houston, Larry Andersen (3) earned a hold, and Aurelio López finished the game with one run over three innings to convert the save (2). This was Garner's first grand slam since September 15, 1978, when he had become the first National League player since 1901 and just the seventh major leaguer to hit two over consecutive games. Moreover, Garner joined teammate José Cruz as one of 36 Major Leaguers through 1986 to have recorded at least 100 home runs and 200 stolen bases during his career. (Note: For combined seasons, from 1900 to 1986, in the regular season, requiring stolen bases ≥ 200 and home runs ≥ 100, sorted by ascending season.)

On June 23, Glenn Davis hit a two-run, walk-off home run to complete a 7–6 comeback versus the Cincinnati Reds in the bottom of the ninth inning. In the top of the ninth, Larry Andersen by proxy was the winning pitcher without a single batter faced; rather, on a wild pitch, the runner on third base sprinted home. Andersen tagged the runner out for the final out of the Reds' 9th inning at bat. The walk-off blast was the first of Davis' career.

During the month of June, Bass collected 37 hits, 5 doubles, 7 home runs, 15 RBI, 5 SB, 12 BB, and 20 runs scored for a slash line of .378 / .460 / .663 / 1.123. Hence, Bass was recognized as NL Player of the Month, with the most recent Astro being teammate José Cruz in July 1984.

Kevin Bass cranked his first career grand slam on July 7 in the top of the ninth at Olympic Stadium, which all but erased an inning-ending, botched steal of home in the top of the second. Earlier in the frame, José Cruz doubled home Glenn Davis for the first run, and tripled and scored in the sixth. It was all Astros from there, as they went on to win 12–1 over the Montreal Expos. Davis swatted two home runs off Dennis Martinez, first a tie-breaking two-run blast in the third, and another for three runs in the fifth. It was Davis' second multi-home run game of the year and third total. Mike Scott cruised over seven smooth frames for the victory, his ninth of the year.

==== MLB All-Star Game at the Astrodome ====
The 1986 Major League Baseball All-Star Game was the 57th playing of the midsummer classic between the all-stars of the American League (AL) and National League (NL), the two leagues comprising Major League Baseball. The game was held on July 15, 1986, at the Astrodome in Houston, Texas, the home of the Astros. The game resulted in the American League defeating the National League 3–2. AL starting pitcher and Boston Red Sox ace Roger Clemens, who later pitched for Houston from 2004 to 2006, was named the All-Star Game Most Valuable Player (MVP) Award winner.

Four Astros were selected to the All-Star Game, including first baseman Glenn Davis, right fielder Kevin Bass, and pitchers Mike Scott and Dave Smith. The quartet matched the 1979 squad for most Astros selected to an All-Star Game, and in 1994, five players went to break the club record. Both Davis and Bass went hitless in pinch hit appearances. Meanwhile, Scott pitched in relief in the seventh inning and fanned his first two hitters swinging, Cal Ripken Jr., and Jesse Barfield, prior to yielding a home run to Frank White. Smith did not enter the game.

==== Later July—August ====
Having just made his first All-Star appearance, Kevin Bass opened a 20-game hitting streak starting July 22 and ending August 13. On July 24, Bass achieved his first career five-hit game. On August 5 and 11, he also realized 3-hit games. Bass hit safely in 31 of 81 at bats for a .383 batting average.

On July 22, one of the great pitching duels of Nolan Ryan's career transpired at the Astrodome. Ryan and Floyd Youmans (10–6) traded nine-inning shutout masterpieces prior to transitioning to extra innings. Ryan struck out 14 Montreal Expos through nine, and led off of the tenth by issuing a base on balls to Tim Wallach. Next, he induced a fly ball from Wayne Krenchicki to center field. However, Ryan surrendered another walk to Mike Fitzgerald. After 9 1/3 innings, Ryan had surrendered one hit with four bases on balls for a game score of 95. Dave Smith (3–6) was summonsed and got the final two outs, retiring Vance Law via the 15th punchout from Houston pitching. Leading off the bottom of the tenth, Davis crushed a Youmans offering (still in the game) for his second walk-off home run of the season as Houston triumphed, 1–0. Also, during his career, Ryan pitched more contests to a game score of 90 or higher than any major leaguer, at 31. The next closest achievers were Walter Johnson and Randy Johnson at 20 each.

On August 8, José Cruz celebrated his 39th birthday by driving in his 1,000th career run, while Mike Scott tossed a shutout to lead a 5–0 blanking of the San Diego Padres. Cruz' two-run single capped a four-run sixth inning, while Scott tossed his third shutout of the season and ended the day leading the league in earned run average (2.16 ERA) and strikeouts (217).

During his August 13 start, Scott yielded 5 earned runs on 7 hits over 5 innings to the Los Angeles Dodgers, losing, 5–3. This problematic outing interrupted a then-club record of 20 successive quality starts. His performance was rated with a game score of 36, the lowest since May 4, which had received a score of 28. That May 4 start had also been his most recent non-quality start. In those 20 starts, Scott registered a 1.62 ERA over 155 2/3 innings pitched, yielding a 1.74 fielding independent pitching (FIP) rate, 9 home runs, 36 bases on balls and 174 strikeouts.

==== Nolan Ryan's 250th win ====
On August 27, Nolan Ryan (9–8) suppressed the Cubs for one hit over six shutout innings to earn his 250th career win via a 7–1 score, prior to turning it over to Charlie Kerfeld. Phil Garner collected four hits while the Astros stole six bases. It was the second four-hit game of Garner's career, who scored a run and had two RBI. Though the Astros did not manage any extra-base hits, they totaled 11 hits, and every starting batter other than Ryan contributed either a hit or an RBI. Moreover, the team coaxed five bases on balls while striking out just three times. Kerfeldt's three-inning effort yielded the Cubs' only run of the contest and five strikeouts for his sixth save. With Ryan's five punchouts, Astros pitching tallied 10 on the day. Taking the loss for the Cubs was rookie Jamie Moyer—the fourth of his career—who like Ryan, would become famous for his longevity. (Note: Moyer joined Ryan as one of the very few to play in each of four decades in the major leagues and went on to win 269 career games over 25 seasons.)

==== September ====
At Wrigley Field on September 3, Mike Scott (15–9) whiffed four Cubs batters during the fifth inning an 8–2 win, among 12 strikeouts total. The four batters struck out in the same inning tied the major league record. He became the first Houston Astro to strike out more three batters in one inning, just the 12th National League pitcher and 18th major leaguer overall. (Note: On June 11, 2003, Octavio Dotel became the next Astros hurler to strike out four batters in one inning.)

José Cruz blasted his sixth career walk-off home run on September 6, during the bottom of the ninth to stun Todd Worrell and the St. Louis Cardinals. It was also the third such type of longball against his former club. (Note: José Cruz: 6 home runs in 1972–1988—walk-off) Cruz also doubled. Glenn Davis slugged his 28th home run and collected three hits while Charlie Kerfeld (9–2) obtained the victory with a scoreless ninth.

Billy Hatcher's two-run single on September 12 proved to be the game-winning hit in an Astros uprising over Padres, 5–3, capping a three-run ninth. Terry Puhl coaxed a bases-loaded walk from Goose Gossage that effected the tying run. Finally, Dave Smith converted his 30th save, the first Houston pitcher to attain this milestone. Seventeen years earlier in 1969, Fred Gladding amassed 29.

From September 23 to 25, the Astros' starting rotation put on display one of the great three-day pitching masterpieces in major league history. On September 23, Jim Deshaies set a major league record by commencing the game with 8 consecutive strikeouts of the Dodgers, which led a 4–0 shutout. (Note: Deshaies' feat was equaled by Jacob deGrom on September 14, 2014, and Germán Márquez on September 26, 2018. The record was later broken on July 11, 2021, by Pablo López, with the Miami Marlins.) The following day, Nolan Ryan silenced the bats of the San Francisco Giants via six innings of no-hit ball until a Mike Aldrete single halted the bid. Charlie Kerfeld took over for the ninth, and surrendered just one hit to polish off a second consecutive two-hit shutout to succeed Deshaies. Ryan hurled eight shutout innings with 12 strikeouts to lead the Astros' 6–0 win and clinch a tie of the NL West division crown. Meanwhile, Glenn Davis launched his 30th home run of the campaign, becoming just the second Astro to realize the milestone, and first since Jimmy Wynn in 1969.

==== Mike Scott's no-hitter ====
During the final contest of the Astros' three-day rotation masterpiece, on September 25, Mike Scott threw a no-hitter against the Giants to lead the Astros, which simultaneously clinched the National League West division title. The final score was 2–0 and Scott struck out 13 Giants batters. It was the first time in National League history and the second no-hitter thrown overall that clinched a playoff berth. Scott's effort earned a game score of 98.

Scott's run support arrived via a solo home run from Denny Walling in the fifth inning, and an RBI single from José Cruz in the seventh inning.

At one point, Scott had retired 14 in a row. The only hitters to reach for San Francisco were Dan Gladden on a hit by pitch—leading the game off, Chili Davis—leading off the second inning, and Phil Ouellette, with the latter two reaching via bases on balls. Gladden and Davis both stole second base.

San Francisco's Will Clark grounded out to first baseman Glenn Davis for the final out of the contest.

Scott's no-hitter was the first to clinch either a division title or pennant outright. Allie Reynolds pitched a no-hitter on September 18, 1951, that clinched a tie for the American League pennant for the New York Yankees during the first game of a doubleheader, leading an 8–0 rout of the Boston Red Sox.

The eighth no-hitter in club history, it reprised the effort by Ryan on September 26, 1981, Houston's most recent. The most recent no-hitter thrown against San Francisco was on May 10, 1981, by Charlie Lea of the Montreal Expos. Houston next no-hitter occurred on September 8, 1993, by Darryl Kile.

Alan Ashby, Scott's batterymate, became the first Houston Astro to catch three no-hitters for the club. Ashby previously caught Ken Forsch's magnum opus on April 7, 1979, and Ryan's in 1981. At the time, this also had tied the major league record, previously executed 11 times, most recently by Jeff Torborg in 1973. (Note: The third and final no-hitter that Torborg caught was delivered by Nolan Ryan on May 15, 1973, when they played for the California Angels.) Another of the 11 distinguished former receivers was Yogi Berra, on staff as a coach that year for the Astros.

==== October ====
The Astros played the Giants through extra innings on October 2. Despite Mike Scott's seven inning effort with eight strikeouts and just one run allowed, San Francisco maintained a 1–0 advantage. However, in the top of the ninth, Kevin Bass bolted home on a wild pitch to tie the score, 1–1. In the top of the tenth, Bill Doran smacked a solo shot for the go-ahead run, and the lead stood. Matt Keough (5–4) earned the victory, while Dave Smith locked down the 2–1 lead in 10th for his 33rd save. Their 93rd victory of the season, this Astros edition tied their 1980 counterparts for most wins in a single season in club history.

For the portion of the season ensuing his May 4 start, Scott tossed a 15–8 record with a 1.87 ERA. Encompassing his final five starts, he struck out 55 and issued four bases on balls.

==== Performance overview ====
The Houston Astros concluded the 1986 campaign with a final record of 96–66 (.593), winning the NL West division by 10 games ahead of the division-runners-up Cincinnati Reds. The Astros pitching staff surrendered the fewest runs per game (3.51), tossed the most shutouts (19), strikeouts (1,160), collected the most saves (51), and ranked second in earned run average (3.15 ERA). The 96 wins set a club record, eclipsing 93 wins by the 1980 squad, and remained until 1998, when the Astros collected 102 victories.

Closer Dave Smith recorded 33 saves, to establish the club record for one season and first with 30 or more. surpassing Fred Gladding's record of 29 amassed in 1969. This remained the club record until Doug Jones closed out 36 in 1993. (Note: For single seasons, playing for HOU, in the regular season, requiring saves ≥ 25, sorted by ascending season.)

Mike Scott, who led the major leagues in numerous categories, including a 2.22 earned run average (ERA) and 306 strikeouts, became the third Astros pitcher to lead the NL in ERA, following J. R. Richard (2.71 in 1979) and Ryan (1.69 in 1981). After having ceded 16 earned runs over his first four outings of the season, Scott concluded with 1.94 ERA over his final 33 starts. Scott also joined Richard as the second Astros pitcher to lead the NL strikeouts (303 in 1978 and 313 in 1979) for the third 300-strikeout season overall by an Astros pitcher. Hence, following J. R. Richard in 1979, Scott became the second Houston Astro to lead the league in two-thirds of the pitching Triple Crown. (Note: Composed of leading the league in each of wins, strikeouts and ERA.)

Further, Scott was the major-league leader in hits per nine innings surrendered (5.949 H/9), marking the eighth instance in that an Astros hurler had led the league. He was preceded by Don Wilson (once), J. R. Richard (thrice) and Nolan Ryan (thrice). Per the Elias Sports Bureau (ESB), Scott became the third hurler since 1950 to lead MLB in strikeouts, ERA, and batting average against, joining Sandy Koufax in 1965 and Richard in 1979.

First baseman Glenn Davis won his first career Silver Slugger Award, the fourth overall in club history, and the first at the position.

Following the season, Mike Scott was recognized with the NL Cy Young Award to become the first Houston Astro to win this award. Moreover, Scott joined Niekro (1979) as the second Astro to be recognized as The Sporting News NL Pitcher of the Year.

Lanier won Manager of the Year honors from multiple outlets. He became the first Astro recognized as NL Manager of the Year as voted by the Baseball Writers' Association of America (BBWAA), the second Astro named by the Associated Press (AP), following Bill Virdon in 1980, and the second Astro named by The Sporting News, also following Virdon in 1980.

=== League standings ===
==== National League West ====
NL West
| Team | W | L | Pct. | GB | Home | Road |
|---|---|---|---|---|---|---|
| Houston Astros | 96 | 66 | .593 | — | 52‍–‍29 | 44‍–‍37 |
| Cincinnati Reds | 86 | 76 | .531 | 10 | 43‍–‍38 | 43‍–‍38 |
| San Francisco Giants | 83 | 79 | .512 | 13 | 46‍–‍35 | 37‍–‍44 |
| San Diego Padres | 74 | 88 | .457 | 22 | 43‍–‍38 | 31‍–‍50 |
| Los Angeles Dodgers | 73 | 89 | .451 | 23 | 46‍–‍35 | 27‍–‍54 |
| Atlanta Braves | 72 | 89 | .447 | 23½ | 41‍–‍40 | 31‍–‍49 |

==== Record versus opponents ====
National League

1986 National League record Sources:
| Team | ATL | CHC | CIN | HOU | LAD | MON | NYM | PHI | PIT | SD | SF | STL |
|---|---|---|---|---|---|---|---|---|---|---|---|---|
| Atlanta | — | 9–3 | 6–12 | 5–13 | 10–8 | 4–7 | 4–8 | 4–8 | 5–7 | 12–6 | 7–11 | 6–6 |
| Chicago | 3–9 | — | 5–7 | 4–8 | 6–6 | 8–10 | 6–12 | 9–8 | 7–11 | 6–6 | 6–6 | 10–7 |
| Cincinnati | 12–6 | 7–5 | — | 4–14 | 10–8 | 7–5 | 4–8 | 7–5 | 10–2 | 9–9 | 9–9 | 7–5 |
| Houston | 13–5 | 8–4 | 14–4 | — | 10–8 | 8–4 | 5–7 | 6–6 | 6–6 | 10–8 | 9–9 | 7–5 |
| Los Angeles | 8–10 | 6–6 | 8–10 | 8–10 | — | 5–7 | 3–9 | 5–7 | 8–4 | 6–12 | 8–10 | 8–4 |
| Montreal | 7–4 | 10–8 | 5–7 | 4–8 | 5–7 | — | 8–10 | 8–10 | 11–7 | 4–8 | 5–7 | 9–9 |
| New York | 8–4 | 12–6 | 8–4 | 7–5 | 9–3 | 10–8 | — | 8–10 | 17–1 | 10–2 | 7–5 | 12–6 |
| Philadelphia | 8-4 | 8–9 | 5–7 | 6–6 | 7–5 | 10–8 | 10–8 | — | 11–7 | 6–6 | 9–3 | 6–12 |
| Pittsburgh | 7–5 | 11–7 | 2–10 | 6–6 | 4–8 | 7–11 | 1–17 | 7–11 | — | 8–4 | 4–8 | 7–11 |
| San Diego | 6–12 | 6–6 | 9–9 | 8–10 | 12–6 | 8–4 | 2–10 | 6–6 | 4–8 | — | 8–10 | 5–7 |
| San Francisco | 11–7 | 6–6 | 9–9 | 9–9 | 10–8 | 7–5 | 5–7 | 3–9 | 8–4 | 10–8 | — | 5–7 |
| St. Louis | 6–6 | 7–10 | 5–7 | 5–7 | 4–8 | 9–9 | 6–12 | 12–6 | 11–7 | 7–5 | 7–5 | — |

=== Notable transactions ===
- June 2, 1986: 1986 Major League Baseball draft
  - Ryan Bowen was drafted by the Astros in the 1st round.
  - Karl Rhodes was drafted by the Astros in the 3rd round. Player signed June 10, 1986.
  - Trenidad Hubbard was drafted by the Astros in the 12th round of the 1986 amateur draft. Player signed June 16, 1986.
  - Ed Whited was drafted by the Houston Astros in the 18th round of the 1986 amateur draft.
  - Eric Anthony was drafted by the Astros in the 34th round. Player signed June 7, 1986.
- June 30, 1986: Matt Keough was signed as a free agent by the Astros.

== Roster ==
1986 Houston Astros
Roster
| Pitchers: 47 Larry Andersen; 49 Jeff Calhoun; 44 Danny Darwin; 43 Jim Deshaies; 11 Frank DiPino; 42 Tom Funk; 38 Manny Hernández; 46 Matt Keough; 37 Charlie Kerfeld; 39 Bob Knepper; 41 Mark Knudson; 35 Aurelio López; 53 Mike Madden; 51 Rafael Montalvo; 34 Nolan Ryan; 33 Mike Scott; 45 Dave Smith; 52 Julio Solano | Catchers: 14 Alan Ashby; 6 Mark Bailey; 4 John Mizerock; 7 Robbie Wine; Infielders: 27 Glenn Davis; 19 Bill Doran; 23 Dan Driessen; 3 Phil Garner; 20 Jim Pankovits; 1 Bert Peña; 22 Rich Perez; 12 Craig Reynolds; 10 Dickie Thon; 29 Denny Walling | Outfielders: 17 Kevin Bass; 9 Eric Bullock; 25 José Cruz; 24 Ty Gainey; 28 Billy Hatcher; 11 Davey Lopes; 26 Louie Meadows; 21 Terry Puhl; 30 Tony Walker | Manager: 22 Hal Lanier; Coaches: 8 Yogi Berra; 48 Matt Galante; 15 Denis Menke; 55 Les Moss; 18 Gene Tenace |

== Game log ==
=== Regular season ===
Legend
| | Astros win |
| | Astros loss |
| | Postponement |
| | Clinched division |
| **Bold** | Astros team member |

1986 regular season game log: 96–66 (Home: 52–29; Away: 44–37)
April: 14–6 (Home: 6–4; Away: 8–2)

| # | Date | Time (CT) | Opponent | Score | Win | Loss | Save | Time of Game | Attendance | Record | Box/ Streak |
|---|---|---|---|---|---|---|---|---|---|---|---|
| 1 | April 8 | 7:35 p.m. CST | Giants | L 3–8 | Krukow (1–0) | **Ryan** (0–1) | Davis (1) | 2:20 | 22,935 | 0–1 | L1 |
| 2 | April 9 | 7:35 p.m. CST | Giants | L 1–4 | Garrelts (1–0) | **Scott** (0–1) | Minton (1) | 2:33 | 6,875 | 0–2 | L2 |
| 3 | April 10 | 7:35 p.m. CST | Giants | **W** 4–0 | **Knepper** (1–0) | Blue (0–1) | — | 2:27 | 6,070 | 1–2 | W1 |
| 4 | April 11 | 7:35 p.m. CST | Braves | **W** 2–1 | **Kerfeld** (1–0) | Palmer (0–1) | **Smith** (1) | 2:14 | 9,357 | 2–2 | W2 |
| 5 | April 12 | 7:35 p.m. CST | Braves | **W** 4–3 | **Ryan** (1–1) | Mahler (1–1) | **Smith** (2) | 2:30 | 19,803 | 3–2 | W3 |
| 6 | April 13 | 2:05 p.m. CST | Braves | L 7–8 | Johnson (1–0) | **Scott** (0–2) | Garber (1) | 2:56 | 8,739 | 3–3 | L1 |
| 7 | April 15 | 3:05 p.m. CST | @ Giants | **W** 8–3 | **Knepper** (2–0) | Blue (0–2) | **Kerfeld** (1) | 3:01 | 46,638 | 4–3 | W1 |
| 8 | April 16 | 2:05 p.m. CST | @ Giants | **W** 4–1 | **Ryan** (2–1) | Mason (0–1) | **Smith** (3) | 2:45 | 3,590 | 5–3 | W2 |
| 9 | April 18 | 6:35 p.m. CST | @ Reds | **W** 6–4 | **Scott** (1–2) | Soto (1–1) | **Smith** (4) | 2:38 | 26,126 | 6–3 | W1 |
| 10 | April 19 | 1:15 p.m. CST | @ Reds | **W** 4–3 | **Knepper** (3–0) | Browning (0–1) | **Smith** (5) | 2:26 | 17,564 | 7–3 | W2 |
| 11 | April 20 | 1:15 p.m. CST | @ Reds | **W** 6–4 | **Madden** (1–0) | Gullickson (0–1) | **Kerfeld** (2) | 2:45 | 17,878 | 8–3 | W3 |
| 12 | April 21 | 6:40 p.m. CST | @ Braves | L 2–8 | Johnson (2–0) | **Ryan** (2–2) | — | 2:36 | 5,361 | 8–4 | L1 |
| 13 | April 22 | 6:40 p.m. CST | @ Braves | **W** 4–3 | **Kerfeld** (2–0) | Ward (0–1) | — | 2:18 | 6,316 | 9–4 | W1 |
| 14 | April 23 | 4:40 p.m. CST | @ Braves | **W** 3–2 | **Solano** (1–0) | Smith (1–1) | **Smith** (6) | 2:27 | 7,666 | 10–4 | W2 |
| 15 | April 24 | 7:35 p.m. CST | Reds | L 0–3 | Soto (2–1) | **Madden** (1–1) | — | 2:35 | 10,245 | 10–5 | L1 |
| 16 | April 25 | 7:35 p.m. CST | Reds | **W** 3–1 | **Ryan** (3–2) | Browning (0–2) | — | 2:07 | 16,296 | 11–5 | W1 |
| 17 | April 26 | 7:35 p.m. CST | Reds | **W** 1–0 | **Scott** (2–2) | Gullickson (0–2) | — | 2:06 | 38,442 | 12–5 | W2 |
| 18 | April 27 | 2:05 p.m. CDT | Reds | **W** 6–0 | **Knepper** (4–0) | Denny (1–2) | — | 2:06 | 12,185 | 13–5 | W3 |
| 19 | April 29 | 6:35 p.m. CDT | @ Phillies | L 4–12 | Rawley (3–1) | **Ryan** (3–3) | — | 2:48 | 16,313 | 13–6 | L1 |
| 20 | April 30 | 6:35 p.m. CDT | @ Phillies | **W** 1–0 | **Scott** (3–2) | Gross (1–3) | **Smith** (7) | 2:38 | 17,134 | 14–6 | W1 |

May: 13–13 (Home: 6–6; Away: 7–7)

| # | Date | Time (CT) | Opponent | Score | Win | Loss | Save | Time of Game | Attendance | Record | Box/ Streak |
|---|---|---|---|---|---|---|---|---|---|---|---|
| 21 | May 2 | 2:35 p.m. CDT | @ Expos | **W** 6–3 | **Knepper** (5–0) | Youmans (0–3) | **Smith** (8) | 2:38 | 6,781 | 15–6 | W2 |
| 22 | May 3 | 12:35 p.m. CDT | @ Expos | L 6–7 (10) | Reardon (3–2) | **DiPino** (0–1) | — | 3:45 | 11,769 | 15–7 | L1 |
| 23 | May 4 | 2:05 p.m. CDT | @ Expos | L 6–7 | Reardon (4–2) | **Smith** (0–1) | — | 3:01 | 13,810 | 15–8 | L2 |
| 24 | May 6 | 6:35 p.m. CDT | @ Mets | L 0–4 | Gooden (5–0) | **Knepper** (5–1) | — | 2:36 | 41,722 | 15–9 | L3 |
| 25 | May 7 | 6:35 p.m. CDT | @ Mets | L 2–3 | Fernandez (4–0) | **Ryan** (3–4) | Orosco (6) | 2:42 | 26,956 | 15–10 | L4 |
| 26 | May 9 | 6:35 p.m. CDT | @ Pirates | **W** 3–2 | **Kerfeld** (3–0) | Winn (1–1) | **Smith** (9) | 2:27 | 17,296 | 16–10 | W1 |
| 27 | May 10 | 6:05 p.m. CDT | @ Pirates | **W** 6–3 | **Knepper** (6–1) | Rhoden (2–2) | **DiPino** (1) | 2:56 | 13,344 | 17–10 | W2 |
| 28 | May 11 | 12:35 p.m. CDT | @ Pirates | L 3–4 (12) | DeLeón (1–0) | **Kerfeld** (3–1) | — | 3:39 | 13,170 | 17–11 | L1 |
| 29 | May 12 | 7:35 p.m. CDT | Phillies | L 1–5 | Rawley (4–3) | **Deshaies** (0–1) | — | 2:18 | 8,354 | 17–12 | L1 |
| 30 | May 13 | 7:35 p.m. CDT | Phillies | **W** 3–2 (11) | **Solano** (2–0) | Rucker (0–1) | — | 2:51 | 7,087 | 18–12 | W1 |
| 31 | May 14 | 7:35 p.m. CDT | Mets | **W** 6–2 | **Knepper** (7–1) | Ojeda (5–1) | — | 2:23 | 11,626 | 19–12 | W2 |
| 32 | May 15 | 7:35 p.m. CDT | Mets | L 2–6 | Darling (4–0) | **Ryan** (3–5) | — | 2:42 | 13,856 | 19–13 | L1 |
| 33 | May 16 | 7:35 p.m. CDT | Cubs | **W** 9–6 | **Solano** (3–0) | Baller (1–2) | **Smith** (10) | 2:50 | 17,802 | 20–13 | W1 |
| 34 | May 17 | 7:35 p.m. CDT | Cubs | **W** 5–1 | **Scott** (4–2) | Trout (2–1) | — | 2:40 | 37,483 | 21–13 | W2 |
| 35 | May 18 | 2:05 p.m. CDT | Cubs | L 2–5 | Hoffman (1–1) | **Knepper** (7–2) | Smith (5) | 3:02 | 14,483 | 21–14 | L1 |
| 36 | May 20 | 7:35 p.m. CDT | Pirates | L 2–4 | Walk (2–0) | **Ryan** (3–6) | — | 2:38 | 8,711 | 21–15 | L2 |
| 37 | May 21 | 7:35 p.m. CDT | Pirates | L 1–2 | Rhoden (3–3) | **Scott** (4–3) | — | 2:22 | 6,990 | 21–16 | L3 |
| 38 | May 22 | 3:35 p.m. CDT | Pirates | **W** 4–0 | **Knepper** (8–2) | Reuschel (3–4) | — | 2:29 | 4,784 | 22–16 | W1 |
| 39 | May 23 | 3:05 p.m. CDT | @ Cubs | L 1–4 | Sutcliffe (2–6) | **Solano** (3–1) | — | 2:23 | 20,532 | 22–17 | L1 |
| 40 | May 24 | 12:20 p.m. CDT | @ Cubs | L 3–4 | Frazier (2–3) | **Smith** (0–2) | Smith (6) | 2:50 | 33,355 | 22–18 | L2 |
| 41 | May 25 | 1:20 p.m. CDT | @ Cubs | **W** 3–1 (11) | **Kerfeld** (4–1) | Smith (0–2) | **Smith** (11) | 3:02 | 36,000 | 23–18 | W1 |
| 42 | May 26 | 5:35 p.m. CDT | @ Cardinals | **W** 4–1 | **Deshaies** (1–1) | Forsch (3–3) | **DiPino** (2) | 2:43 | 20,099 | 24–18 | W2 |
| 43 | May 27 | 7:35 p.m. CDT | @ Cardinals | **W** 5–4 | **Smith** (1–2) | Dayley (0–3) | — | 2:48 | 20,146 | 25–18 | W3 |
| 44 | May 28 | 12:35 p.m. CDT | @ Cardinals | **W** 4–3 (11) | **Kerfeld** (5–1) | Worrell (3–3) | — | 3:18 | 17,582 | 26–18 | W4 |
| 45 | May 30 | 7:35 p.m. CDT | Expos | L 0–1 | Smith (4–4) | **Scott** (4–4) | Reardon (12) | 2:14 | 13,854 | 26–19 | L1 |
| 46 | May 31 | 7:35 p.m. CDT | Expos | **W** 4–3 | **DiPino** (1–1) | Burke (2–1) | **Smith** (12) | 2:30 | 25,831 | 27–19 | W1 |

June: 14–15 (Home: 9–6; Away: 5–9)

| # | Date | Time (CT) | Opponent | Score | Win | Loss | Save | Time of Game | Attendance | Record | Box/ Streak |
|---|---|---|---|---|---|---|---|---|---|---|---|
| 47 | June 1 | 2:05 p.m. CDT | Expos | **W** 8–4 | **Knepper** (9–2) | Hesketh (3–4) | — | 2:38 | 13,325 | 28–19 | W2 |
| 48 | June 2 | 7:35 p.m. CDT | Cardinals | L 2–9 | Tudor (5–3) | **Madden** (1–2) | — | 2:45 | 11,669 | 28–20 | L1 |
| 49 | June 3 | 7:35 p.m. CDT | Cardinals | L 1–3 | Mathews (1–0) | **Deshaies** (1–2) | Worrell (8) | 2:20 | 6,430 | 28–21 | L2 |
| 50 | June 4 | 7:35 p.m. CDT | Cardinals | **W** 4–2 | **Scott** (5–4) | Burris (2–2) | **Smith** (13) | 2:33 | 11,396 | 29–21 | W1 |
| 51 | June 5 | 9:35 p.m. CDT | @ Dodgers | L 0–1 | Honeycutt (3–3) | **Hernández** (0–1) | Howell (3) | 2:25 | 32,545 | 29–22 | L1 |
| 52 | June 6 | 9:35 p.m. CDT | @ Dodgers | L 2–3 | Howell (2–2) | **Knepper** (9–3) | — | 2:52 | 38,991 | 29–23 | L2 |
| 53 | June 7 | 2:20 p.m. CDT | @ Dodgers | **W** 7–5 | **López** (1–0) | Howell (2–3) | **Smith** (14) | 3:27 | 32,902 | 30–23 | W1 |
| 54 | June 8 | 3:05 p.m. CDT | @ Dodgers | **W** 3–2 | **Scott** (6–4) | Valenzuela (8–4) | **Smith** (15) | 2:44 | 47,404 | 31–23 | W2 |
| 55 | June 9 | 9:05 p.m. CDT | @ Padres | **W** 5–3 | **Deshaies** (2–2) | Show (3–4) | **López** (1) | 2:42 | 19,167 | 32–23 | W3 |
| 56 | June 10 | 9:05 p.m. CDT | @ Padres | **W** 12–1 | **Knepper** (10–3) | Dravecky (5–6) | — | 2:31 | 13,966 | 33–23 | W4 |
| 57 | June 11 | 3:05 p.m. CDT | @ Padres | L 7–11 | McCullers (2–1) | **DiPino** (1–2) | — | 2:47 | 13,686 | 33–24 | L1 |
| 58 | June 12 | 7:35 p.m. CDT | Giants | **W** 4–1 | **Hernández** (1–1) | Krukow (8–4) | **Smith** (16) | 2:37 | 16,342 | 34–24 | W1 |
| 59 | June 13 | 7:35 p.m. CDT | Giants | L 1–3 | Davis (2–3) | **Scott** (6–5) | — | 2:22 | 23,352 | 34–25 | L1 |
| 60 | June 14 | 7:35 p.m. CDT | Giants | **W** 7–3 | **Deshaies** (3–2) | Mulholland (0–1) | **López** (2) | 2:48 | 32,477 | 35–25 | W1 |
| 61 | June 15 | 2:05 p.m. CDT | Giants | L 2–7 | Blue (4–3) | **Knepper** (10–4) | — | 2:56 | 22,958 | 35–26 | L1 |
| 62 | June 17 | 6:35 p.m. CDT | @ Reds | L 4–5 | Welsh (2–1) | **Hernández** (1–2) | Franco (11) | 2:33 | 16,824 | 35–27 | L2 |
| 63 | June 18 | 6:35 p.m. CDT | @ Reds | L 2–3 | Robinson (5–0) | **Smith** (1–3) | — | 2:20 | 17,426 | 35–28 | L3 |
| 64 | June 19 | 6:35 p.m. CDT | @ Reds | **W** 6–2 | **Deshaies** (4–2) | Soto (3–7) | — | 2:54 | 25,920 | 36–28 | W1 |
| 65 | June 20 | 10:05 p.m. CDT | @ Giants | 1–3 | Blue (5–3) | **Knepper** (10–5) | Berenguer (2) | 2:18 | 25,116 | 36–29 | L1 |
| 66 | June 21 | 3:05 p.m. CDT | @ Giants | 1–2 | Garrelts (6–6) | **Knudson** (0–1) | Berenguer (3) | 2:51 | 24,927 | 36–30 | L2 |
| 67 (1) | June 22 | 2:05 p.m. CDT | @ Giants | 2–4 | Krukow (9–4) | **Hernández** (1–3) | — | 2:22 | N/A | 36–31 | L3 |
| 68 (2) | June 22 | 5:02 p.m. CDT | @ Giants | 2–3 | Berenguer (1–0) | **Smith** (1–4) | Hensley (1) | 2:42 | 47,030 | 36–32 | L4 |
| 69 | June 23 | 7:35 p.m. CDT | Reds | **W** 7–6 | **Anderson** (1–0) | Power (3–5) | — | 2:57 | 12,953 | 37–32 | W1 |
| 70 | June 24 | 7:35 p.m. CDT | Reds | **W** 8–4 | **Ryan** (4–6) | Browning (5–7) | — | 2:44 | 17,487 | 38–32 | W2 |
| 71 | June 25 | 7:35 p.m. CDT | Reds | L 3–4 (10) | Franco (1–4) | **López** (1–1) | — | 3:00 | 13,313 | 38–33 | L1 |
| 72 | June 27 | 7:35 p.m. CDT | Dodgers | **W** 5–0 | **Scott** (7–5) | Reuss (2–6) | — | 2:06 | 25,760 | 39–33 | W1 |
| 73 | June 28 | 7:35 p.m. CDT | Dodgers | **W** 6–4 | **Deshaies** (5–2) | Welch (3–6) | **Aurelio López** (3) | 2:35 | 34,252 | 40–33 | W2 |
| 74 | June 29 | 2:05 p.m. CDT | Dodgers | **W** 2–1 | **Hernández** (2–3) | Valenzuela (10–5) | **DiPino** (3) | 2:23 | 32,723 | 41–33 | W3 |
| 75 | June 30 | 7:35 p.m. CDT | Padres | L 2–9 | Dravecky (7–7) | **Knepper** (10–6) | — | 2:22 | 11,141 | 41–34 | L1 |

July: 16–11 (Home: 11–5; Away: 5–6)

| # | Date | Time (CT) | Opponent | Score | Win | Loss | Save | Time of Game | Attendance | Record | Box/ Streak |
|---|---|---|---|---|---|---|---|---|---|---|---|
| 76 | July 1 | 7:35 p.m. CDT | Padres | L 4–7 | Show (7–4) | **Knudson** (0–2) | Gossage (14) | 2:46 | 13,866 | 41–35 | L2 |
| 77 | July 2 | 7:35 p.m. CDT | Padres | **W** 8–1 | **Scott** (8–5) | Hawkins (5–5) | — | 2:18 | 10,148 | 42–35 | W1 |
| 78 | July 3 | 6:35 p.m. CDT | @ Mets | L 5–6 (10) | Orosco (4–4) | **DiPino** (1–3) | — | 3:08 | 48,839 | 42–36 | L1 |
| 79 | July 4 | 12:35 p.m. CDT | @ Mets | L 1–2 | Gooden (10–3) | **Smith** (1–5) | — | 2:39 | 28,557 | 42–37 | L2 |
| 80 | July 5 | 6:05 p.m. CDT | @ Mets | **W** 2–1 | **Kerfeld** (6–1) | McDowell (7–1) | — | 2:24 | 50,939 | 43–37 | W1 |
| 81 | July 6 | 12:35 p.m. CDT | @ Mets | L 3–5 | Fernandez (11–2) | **Knudson** (0–3) | McDowell (8) | 3:08 | 31,017 | 43–38 | L1 |
| 82 | July 7 | 6:35 p.m. CDT | @ Expos | **W** 12–1 | **Scott** (9–5) | Martínez (0–1) | — | 2:40 | 17,694 | 44–38 | W1 |
| 83 | July 8 | 6:35 p.m. CDT | @ Expos | **W** 4–1 | **Ryan** (5–6) | Tibbs (4–5) | **Kerfeld** (3) | 2:29 | 16,382 | 45–38 | W2 |
| 84 | July 9 | 6:05 p.m. CDT | @ Expos | L 1–2 | Youmans (9–5) | **Knepper** (10–7) | — | 2:08 | 15,316 | 45–39 | L1 |
| 85 | July 10 | 7:35 p.m. CDT | Phillies | **W** 11–4 | **Knudson** (1–3) | Hudson (4–9) | — | 2:39 | 18,289 | 46–39 | W1 |
| 86 | July 11 | 7:35 p.m. CDT | Phillies | L 1–4 | Carman (4–2) | **Scott** (9–6) | Bedrosian (11) | 2:22 | 18,047 | 46–40 | L1 |
| 87 | July 12 | 12:50 p.m. CDT | Phillies | **W** 4–3 | **Ryan** (6–6) | Rawley (11–5) | **Smith** (17) | 2:51 | 17,491 | 47–40 | W1 |
| 88 | July 13 | 2:05 p.m. CDT | Phillies | L 4–5 (11) | Bedrosian (6–3) | **Smith** (1–6) | — | 3:01 | 20,597 | 47–41 | L1 |
| — | July 15 | 7:30 p.m. CDT | **57th All-Star Game in Houston, TX** | | | | | | | | |
| 89 | July 17 | 7:35 p.m. CDT | Mets | L 2–13 | Ojeda (11–2) | **Ryan** (6–7) | — | 3:10 | 21,536 | 47–42 | L2 |
| 90 | July 18 | 7:35 p.m. CDT | Mets | **W** 3–0 | **Knepper** (11–7) | Darling (9–3) | — | 2:25 | 22,906 | 48–42 | W1 |
| 91 | July 19 | 7:35 p.m. CDT | Mets | **W** 5–4 | **Smith** (2–6) | McDowell (7–3) | — | 2:38 | 44,502 | 49–42 | W2 |
| 92 | July 20 | 2:05 p.m. CDT | Mets | **W** 9–8 (15) | **Knepper** (12–7) | McDowell (7–4) | — | 5:29 | 23,900 | 50–42 | W3 |
| 93 | July 21 | 7:35 p.m. CDT | Expos | **W** 8–7 | **Kerfeld** (7–1) | Reardon (6–5) | — | 3:03 | 13,753 | 51–42 | W4 |
| 94 | July 22 | 7:35 p.m. CDT | Expos | **W** 1–0 (10) | **Smith** (3–6) | Youmans (10–6) | — | 2:43 | 19,271 | 52–42 | W5 |
| 95 | July 23 | 7:35 p.m. CDT | Expos | **W** 4–3 (11) | **López** (2–1) | Burke (7–4) | — | 3:07 | 15,364 | 53–42 | W6 |
| 96 | July 24 | 6:35 p.m. CDT | @ Phillies | **W** 9–3 | **Scott** (10–6) | Rawley (11–7) | — | 2:37 | 31,094 | 54–42 | W7 |
| 97 | July 25 | 6:35 p.m. CDT | @ Phillies | L 2–4 | Hudson (6–9) | **Deshaies** (5–3) | Bedrosian (13) | 2:28 | 23,387 | 54–43 | L1 |
| 98 | July 26 | 6:05 p.m. CDT | @ Phillies | L 2–3 | Carman (5–2) | **Knudson** (1–4) | Schatzeder (2) | 2:24 | 34,075 | 54–44 | L2 |
| 99 | July 27 | 12:35 p.m. CDT | @ Phillies | **W** 3–2 | **Ryan** (7–7) | Gross (6–8) | **López** (4) | 2:14 | 33,192 | 55–44 | W1 |
| 100 | July 28 | 7:35 p.m. CDT | Braves | **W** 4–2 | **Knepper** (13–7) | Alexander (6–7) | **Smith** (18) | 2:19 | 24,597 | 56–44 | W2 |
| 101 | July 29 | 7:35 p.m. CDT | Braves | L 0–1 | Palmer (7–8) | **Scott** (10–7) | Garber (13) | 2:31 | 26,610 | 56–45 | L1 |
| 102 | July 30 | 7:35 p.m. CDT | Braves | **W** 4–2 | **Deshaies** (6–3) | Acker (3–5) | **Smith** (19) | 2:50 | 34,102 | 57–45 | W3 |

August: 16–12 (Home: 8–4; Away: 8–8)

| # | Date | Time (CT) | Opponent | Score | Win | Loss | Save | Time of Game | Attendance | Record | Box/ Streak |
|---|---|---|---|---|---|---|---|---|---|---|---|
| 103 | August 1 | 9:05 p.m. CDT | @ Padres | **W** 6–3 | **Knepper** (14–7) | Hoyt (5–7) | **Smith** (20) | 2:39 | 22,108 | 58–45 | W2 |
| 104 | August 2 | 9:05 p.m. CDT | @ Padres | **W** 5–4 | **Scott** (11–7) | Show (7–5) | **Smith** (21) | 2:40 | 28,612 | 59–45 | W3 |
| 105 | August 3 | 3:05 p.m. CDT | @ Padres | L 1–5 | Hawkins (8–7) | **Knudson** (1–5) | Gossage (18) | 2:20 | 21,850 | 59–46 | L1 |
| 106 | August 4 | 7:05 p.m. CDT | @ Dodgers | L 3–7 | Valenzuela (15–6) | **Kerfeld** (7–2) | — | 2:54 | 32,182 | 59–47 | L2 |
| 107 | August 5 | 9:35 p.m. CDT | @ Dodgers | **W** 10–2 | **López** (3–1) | Howell (4–7) | **Smith** (22) | 3:21 | 45,525 | 60–47 | W1 |
| 108 | August 6 | 3:05 p.m. CDT | @ Dodgers | L 4–7 | Honeycutt (8–6) | **Keough** (2–3) | Neidenfuer (7) | 3:06 | 40,709 | 60–48 | L1 |
| 109 | August 8 | 7:35 p.m. CDT | Padres | **W** 5–0 | **Scott** (12–7) | McCullers (5–6) | — | 2:15 | 31,142 | 61–48 | W1 |
| 110 | August 9 | 7:35 p.m. CDT | Padres | **W** 6–2 | **Deshaies** (7–3) | Hawkins (8–8) | **Kerfeld** (4) | 2:28 | 38,169 | 62–48 | W2 |
| 111 | August 10 | 2:05 p.m. CDT | Padres | L 3–5 | Dravecky (8–9) | **Knepper** (14–8) | Gossage (19) | 2:30 | 20,839 | 62–49 | L1 |
| 112 | August 11 | 7:05 p.m. CDT | Dodgers | **W** 7–6 | **Smith** (4–6) | Howell (4–8) | — | 3:31 | 23,206 | 63–49 | W1 |
| 113 | August 12 | 7:35 p.m. CDT | Dodgers | **W** 3–0 | **Ryan** (8–7) | Honeycutt (8–7) | **Kerfeld** (5) | 2:25 | 37,973 | 64–49 | W2 |
| 114 | August 13 | 7:35 p.m. CDT | Dodgers | L 3–5 | Hershiser (12–8) | **Scott** (12–8) | Niedenfuer (8) | 2:40 | 33,327 | 64–50 | L1 |
| 115 | August 14 | 7:35 p.m. CDT | Dodgers | **W** 3–2 | **Andersen** (2–0) | Valenzuela (15–8) | **Smith** (23) | 2:15 | 42,118 | 65–50 | W1 |
| 116 | August 15 | 6:40 p.m. CDT | @ Braves | **W** 3–0 | **Knepper** (15–8) | Acker (4–6) | — | 2:14 | 26,625 | 66–50 | W2 |
| 117 | August 16 | 6:40 p.m. CDT | @ Braves | **W** 7–4 | **Keough** (3–3) | Mahler (11–12) | **Smith** (24) | 2:43 | 31,862 | 67–50 | W3 |
| 118 | August 17 | 1:10 p.m. CDT | @ Braves | L 3–4 | Speck (2–0) | **Andersen** (2–1) | Garber (18) | 2:54 | 17,618 | 67–51 | L1 |
| 119 | August 18 | 6:35 p.m. CDT | @ Pirates | **W** 3–0 | **Scott** (13–8) | Walk (5–7) | — | 2:24 | 7,965 | 68–51 | W1 |
| 120 | August 19 | 6:35 p.m. CDT | @ Pirates | **W** 1–0 | **Deshaies** (8–3) | Bielecki (6–9) | **Smith** (25) | 2:31 | 9,128 | 69–51 | W2 |
| 121 | August 20 | 6:35 p.m. CDT | @ Pirates | L 1–4 | Rhoden (14–7) | **Knepper** (15–9) | — | 2:12 | 16,997 | 69–52 | L1 |
| 122 | August 22 | 7:35 p.m. CDT | @ Cardinals | L 5–6 | Tudor (13–6) | **Ryan** (8–8) | Worrell (28) | 2:44 | 33,918 | 69–53 | L2 |
| 123 | August 23 | 7:05 p.m. CDT | @ Cardinals | L 1–7 | Cox (8–10) | **Scott** (13–9) | — | 2:28 | 40,944 | 69–54 | L3 |
| 124 | August 24 | 1:15 p.m. CDT | @ Cardinals | **W** 5–1 | **Deshaies** (9–3) | Conroy (3–8) | **López** (5) | 2:50 | 33,687 | 70–54 | W1 |
| 125 | August 25 | 7:35 p.m. CDT | Cubs | **W** 3–2 | **Kerfeld** (8–2) | Smith (8–8) | **Smith** (26) | 2:40 | 24,211 | 71–54 | W2 |
| 126 | August 26 | 7:35 p.m. CDT | Cubs | L 3–5 | Lynch (4–3) | **Darwin** (6–9) | Smith (25) | 2:33 | 22,579 | 71–55 | L1 |
| 127 | August 27 | 7:35 p.m. CDT | Cubs | **W** 7–1 | **Ryan** (9–8) | oyer (5–4) | **Kerfeld** (6) | 2:39 | 24,198 | 72–55 | W1 |
| 128 | August 29 | 7:35 p.m. CDT | Pirates | **W** 3–2 | **Scott** (14–9) | Reuschel (8–15) | **Smith** (27) | 2:37 | 22,801 | 73–55 | W2 |
| 129 | August 30 | 7:35 p.m. CDT | Pirates | L 3–13 | Rhoden (15–7) | **Deshaies** (9–4) | — | 2:46 | 30,598 | 73–56 | L1 |
| 130 | August 31 | 2:05 p.m. CDT | Pirates | L 2–8 | Walk (7–7) | **Knepper** (15–10) | — | 2:17 | 25,405 | 73–57 | L2 |

September: 18–9 (Home: 9–3; Away: 9–6)

| # | Date | Time (CT) | Opponent | Score | Win | Loss | Save | Time of Game | Attendance | Record | Box/ Streak |
|---|---|---|---|---|---|---|---|---|---|---|---|
| 131 | September 1 | 1:20 p.m. CDT | @ Cubs | **W** 6–4 | **Darwin** (7–9) | Lynch (4–4) | **Smith** (28) | 3:01 | 25,547 | 74–57 | W1 |
| 132 | September 2 | 3:05 p.m. CDT | @ Cubs | **W** 8–7 (18) | **Darwin** (8–9) | Maddux (0–1) | — | 5:14 | 10,501 | 75–57 | W2 |
| 133 | September 3 | 1:20 p.m. CDT | @ Cubs | **W** 8–2 | **Scott** (15–9) | Sanderson (7–11) | — | 2:48 | 7,051 | 76–57 | W3 |
| 134 | September 5 | 7:35 p.m. CDT | Cardinals | L 5–8 | Soff (2–0) | **López** (3–2) | — | 2:50 | 23,547 | 76–58 | L1 |
| 135 | September 6 | 7:35 p.m. CDT | Cardinals | **W** 7–6 | **Kerfeld** (9–2) | Worrell (8–10) | — | 2:58 | 21,802 | 77–58 | W1 |
| 136 | September 7 | 2:05 p.m. CDT | Cardinals | **W** 6–3 | **Calhoun** (1–0) | Mathews (10–5) | **Smith** (29) | 2:50 | 20,773 | 78–58 | W2 |
| 137 | September 8 | 7:35 p.m. CDT | Reds | **W** 3–1 | **Ryan** (10–8) | Welsh (5–6) | **Kerfeld** (7) | 2:26 | 26,997 | 79–58 | W3 |
| 138 | September 9 | 7:35 p.m. CDT | Reds | **W** 9–2 | **Scott** (16–9) | Browning (12–12) | — | 2:11 | 22,711 | 80–58 | W4 |
| 139 | September 10 | 9:35 p.m. CDT | @ Dodgers | L 1–5 | Hershiser (13–10) | **Deshaies** (9–5) | — | 2:56 | 27,534 | 80–59 | L1 |
| 140 | September 11 | 9:35 p.m. CDT | @ Dodgers | L 6–14 | Valenzuela (19–9) | **Knepper** (15–11) | — | 2:51 | 34,816 | 80–60 | L2 |
| 141 | September 12 | 9:05 p.m. CDT | @ Padres | **W** 5–3 | **Kerfeld** (10–2) | McCullers (8–8) | **Smith** (30) | 2:35 | 11,319 | 81–60 | W1 |
| 142 | September 13 | 9:05 p.m. CDT | @ Padres | L 3–4 | Lefferts (8–7) | **Smith** (4–7) | — | 2:42 | 32,729 | 81–61 | L1 |
| 143 | September 14 | 3:05 p.m. CDT | @ Padres | L 2–3 | Lefferts (9–7) | **Scott** (16–10) | — | 2:35 | 13,279 | 81–62 | L2 |
| 144 | September 16 | 6:35 p.m. CDT | @ Reds | **W** 6–1 | **Knepper** (16–11) | Gullickson (13–11) | **Andersen** (1) | 2:34 | 16,927 | 82–62 | W1 |
| 145 | September 17 | 6:35 p.m. CDT | @ Reds | **W** 6–1 | **Darwin** (9–9) | Welsh (6–7) | — | 2:26 | 15,195 | 83–62 | W2 |
| 146 | September 18 | 11:35 a.m. CDT | @ Reds | **W** 5–3 | **Keough** (4–3) | Browning (13–13) | **López** (6) | 2:16 | 11,825 | 84–62 | W3 |
| 147 | September 19 | 7:35 p.m. CDT | Padres | **W** 5–4 | **Kerfeld** (11–2) | LaPoint (4–9) | **Smith** (31) | 2:47 | 23,805 | 85–62 | W4 |
| 148 | September 20 | 7:35 p.m. CDT | Padres | **W** 10–6 | **Scott** (17–10) | Hayward (0–1) | — | 2:33 | 36,878 | 86–62 | W5 |
| 149 | September 21 | 2:05 p.m. CDT | Padres | L 0–5 | Jones (1–0) | **Knepper** (16–12) | — | 2:24 | 23,385 | 86–63 | L1 |
| 150 | September 22 | 7:35 p.m. CDT | Dodgers | L 2–9 | Valenzuela (20–10) | **Darwin** (9–10) | — | 2:35 | 27,641 | 86–64 | L2 |
| 151 | September 23 | 7:35 p.m. CDT | Dodgers | **W** 4–0 | **Deshaies** (10–5) | Powell (2–7) | — | 2:44 | 27,734 | 87–64 | W1 |
| 152 | September 24 | 7:35 p.m. CDT | Giants | **W** 6–0 | **Ryan** (11–8) | LaCoss (10–13) | — | 2:39 | 37,611 | 88–64 | W2 |
| 153 | September 25 | 3:35 p.m. CDT | Giants | **W** 2–0 | **Scott** (18–10) | Berenguer (2–3) | — | 2:24 | 32,808 | 89–64 | W3 |
| 154 | September 26 | 6:40 p.m. CDT | @ Braves | L 4–5 | Alexander (11–10) | **Keough** (4–4) | Smith (1) | 2:15 | 6,754 | 89–65 | L1 |
| 155 | September 27 | 1:20 p.m. CDT | @ Braves | **W** 4–0 | **Darwin** (10–10) | Palmer (11–10) | — | 2:22 | 13,545 | 90–65 | W1 |
| 156 | September 28 | 1:10 p.m. CDT | @ Braves | **W** 2–0 | **Deshaies** (11–5) | Acker (5–11) | **Smith** (32) | 2:22 | 6,280 | 91–65 | W2 |
| 157 | September 30 | 9:35 p.m. CDT | @ Giants | L 5–6 | Davis (5–7) | **López** (3–3) | — | 2:34 | 13,358 | 91–66 | L1 |

October: 5–0 (Home: 3–0; Away: 2–0)

| # | Date | Time (CT) | Opponent | Score | Win | Loss | Save | Time of Game | Attendance | Record | Box/ Streak |
|---|---|---|---|---|---|---|---|---|---|---|---|
| 158 | October 1 | 2:05 p.m. CDT | @ Giants | **W** 5–0 | **Darwin** (11–10) | Krukow (19–9) | — | 2:41 | 9,881 | 92–66 | W1 |
| 159 | October 2 | 3:05 p.m. CDT | @ Giants | **W** 2–1 | **Keough** (5–4) | Robinson (6–3) | **Smith** (33) | 3:07 | 8,656 | 93–66 | W2 |
| 160 | October 3 | 7:35 p.m. CDT | Braves | **W** 6–2 | **Ryan** (12–8) | Acker (5–12) | — | 2:22 | 25,068 | 94–66 | W3 |
| 161 | October 4 | 1:20 p.m. CDT | Braves | **W** 3–2 | **Deshaies** (12–5) | Smith (8–16) | **López** (7) | 2:18 | 17,314 | 95–66 | W4 |
| 162 | October 5 | 2:05 p.m. CDT | Braves | **W** 4–1 | **Knepper** (17–12) | Mahler (14–18) | — | 1:50 | 37,531 | 96–66 | W5 |

=== Detailed records ===
National League
| Opponent | W | L | WP | RS | RA |
NL East
Chicago Cubs
Montreal Expos
| New York Mets | 5 | 7 | 0.417 | 40 | 54 |
Philadelphia Phillies
Pittsburgh Pirates
St. Louis Cardinals
Div Total
NL West
Atlanta Braves
Cincinnati Reds
| **Houston Astros** | | | | | |
Los Angeles Dodgers
San Diego Padres
San Francisco Giants
Div Total
Season Total

| Month | Games | Won | Lost | Win % | RS | RA |
|---|---|---|---|---|---|---|
April
May
June
July
August
September
October
Total

| | Games | Won | Lost | Win % | RS | RA |
Home
Away
Total

=== Postseason Game log ===
Legend
| | Astros win |
| | Astros loss |
| | Postponement |
| **Bold** | Astros team member |

1986 Postseason game log: 2–4 (Home: 1–2; Away: 1–2)
NL Championship Series: vs. New York Mets 2–4 (Home: 1–2; Away: 1–2)

| # | Date | Time (CT) | Opponent | Score | Win | Loss | Save | Time of Game | Attendance | Series | Box/ Streak |
|---|---|---|---|---|---|---|---|---|---|---|---|
| 1 | October 8 | 7:25 p.m. CDT | Mets | **W** 1–0 | **Scott** (1–0) | Gooden (0–1) | — | 2:56 | 44,131 | HOU 1–0 | W1 |
| 2 | October 9 | 7:20 p.m. CDT | Mets | L 1–5 | Ojeda (1–0) | **Ryan** (0–1) | — | 2:40 | 44,391 | Tied 1–1 | L1 |
| 3 | October 11 | 11:10 a.m. CDT | @ Mets | L 5–6 | Orosco (1–0) | **Smith** (0–1) | — | 2:55 | 55,052 | NYN 2–1 | L2 |
| 4 | October 12 | 7:20 p.m. CDT | @ Mets | **W** 3–1 | **Scott** (2–0) | Fernandez (0–1) | — | 2:23 | 55,038 | Tied 2–2 | W1 |
| — | October 13 | 2:05 p.m. CDT | @ Mets | **Postponed (Rain)** (Makeup date: October 14) | | | | | | | |
| 5 | October 14 | 12:05 p.m. CDT | @ Mets | L 1–2 (12) | Orosco (2–0) | **Kerfeld** (0–1) | — | 3:45 | 54,986 | NYN 3–2 | L1 |
| 6 | October 15 | 2:05 p.m. CDT | Mets | L 5–6 (16) | Orosco (3–0) | **López** (0–1) | — | 4:42 | 45,718 | NYN 4–2 | L2 |

== Player statistics ==
Table legend
| * | Left-handed batter or pitcher | League leader (Bold: MLB leader) |
| # | Switch hitter | League top ten |
| | Leader in appearances at position | Team leader |

=== Batting ===
Abbreviations key

- Pos. – primary position
- G — games played
- AB — at bats
- H — hits
- HR — home runs
- RBI — runs batted in
- AVG — batting average

==== Starters by position ====
Regular season batting results
| Pos. | Player | G | AB | H | Avg. | HR | RBI |
|---|---|---|---|---|---|---|---|
| C | Alan Ashby | 120 | 315 | 81 | .257 | 7 | 38 |
| 1B | Glenn Davis | 158 | 574 | 152 | .265 | 31 | 101 |
| 2B | Bill Doran | 145 | 550 | 152 | .276 | 6 | 37 |
| SS | Craig Reynolds | 114 | 313 | 78 | .249 | 6 | 41 |
| 3B | Denny Walling | 130 | 382 | 119 | .312 | 13 | 58 |
| LF | José Cruz | 141 | 479 | 133 | .278 | 10 | 72 |
| CF | Billy Hatcher | 127 | 419 | 108 | .258 | 6 | 36 |
| RF | Kevin Bass | 157 | 591 | 184 | .311 | 20 | 79 |

==== Other batters ====
Regular season batting results
| Player | G | AB | H | Avg. | HR | RBI |
|---|---|---|---|---|---|---|
| Phil Garner | 107 | 313 | 83 | .265 | 9 | 41 |
| Dickie Thon | 106 | 278 | 69 | .248 | 3 | 21 |
| Terry Puhl | 81 | 172 | 42 | .244 | 3 | 14 |
| Mark Bailey | 57 | 153 | 27 | .176 | 4 | 15 |
| Jim Pankovits | 70 | 113 | 32 | .283 | 1 | 7 |
| Davey Lopes | 37 | 98 | 23 | .235 | 1 | 13 |
| Tony Walker | 84 | 90 | 20 | .222 | 2 | 10 |
| John Mizerock | 44 | 81 | 15 | .185 | 1 | 6 |
| Ty Gainey | 26 | 50 | 15 | .300 | 1 | 6 |
| Bert Peña | 15 | 29 | 6 | .207 | 0 | 2 |
| Dan Driessen | 17 | 24 | 7 | .292 | 1 | 3 |
| Eric Bullock | 6 | 21 | 1 | .048 | 0 | 1 |
| Robbie Wine | 9 | 12 | 3 | .250 | 0 | 0 |
| Louie Meadows | 6 | 6 | 2 | .333 | 0 | 0 |

=== Pitching ===
Abbreviations key

- W — wins
- L — losses
- ERA — earned run average
- G — games pitched
- GS — games started
- CG — complete games
- ShO — shutouts
- SV — saves
- IP — innings pitched
- H — hits allowed
- SO — strikeouts
- WHIP — walks plus hits per inning pitched

==== Starting pitchers ====
Regular season pitching results
| Player | W | L | ERA | G | GS | CG | ShO | IP | H | SO | WHIP |
|---|---|---|---|---|---|---|---|---|---|---|---|
| Mike Scott | 18 | 10 | **2.22** | 37 | 37 | 7 | 5 | **275.1** | 182 | **306** | **0.923** |
| Bob Knepper* | 17 | 12 | 3.14 | 40 | 38 | 8 | 5 | 258.0 | 232 | 143 | 1.140 |
| Nolan Ryan | 12 | 8 | 3.34 | 30 | 30 | 1 | 0 | 178.0 | 119 | 194 | 1.129 |
| Jim Deshaies* | 12 | 5 | 3.25 | 26 | 26 | 1 | 1 | 144.0 | 124 | 128 | 1,271 |
| Mark Knudson | 1 | 5 | 4.22 | 9 | 7 | 0 | 0 | 42.2 | 48 | 20 | 1.477 |

==== Other pitchers ====
Regular season pitching results
| Player | G | IP | W | L | ERA | SO |
|---|---|---|---|---|---|---|
| Danny Darwin | 12 | 54.1 | 5 | 2 | 2.32 | 40 |
| Mike Madden* | 13 | 39.2 | 1 | 2 | 4.08 | 30 |
| Matt Keough | 10 | 35.0 | 3 | 2 | 3.09 | 25 |
| Manny Hernández | 9 | 27.2 | 2 | 3 | 3.90 | 9 |

==== Relief pitchers ====
Regular season pitching results
| Player | G | IP | W | L | SV | ERA | SO |
|---|---|---|---|---|---|---|---|
| Dave Smith | 54 | 56.0 | 4 | 7 | 33 | 2.73 | 46 |
| Charlie Kerfeld | 61 | 93.2 | 11 | 2 | 7 | 2.59 | 77 |
| Aurelio López | 45 | 78.0 | 3 | 3 | 7 | 3.46 | 44 |
| Larry Andersen | 38 | 64.2 | 2 | 1 | 1 | 2.78 | 33 |
| Frank DiPino* | 41 | 40.1 | 1 | 3 | 3 | 3.57 | 27 |
| Julio Solano | 16 | 32.0 | 3 | 1 | 0 | 7.59 | 21 |
| Jeff Calhoun* | 20 | 26.2 | 1 | 0 | 0 | 3.71 | 14 |
| Tom Funk* | 8 | 8.1 | 0 | 0 | 0 | 6.48 | 2 |
| Rafael Montalvo | 1 | 1.0 | 0 | 0 | 0 | 9.00 | 0 |

== National League Championship Series ==
=== Game 1 ===
October 8 (Astrodome, Houston, Texas)

| Team | 1 | 2 | 3 | 4 | 5 | 6 | 7 | 8 | 9 | R | H | E |
|---|---|---|---|---|---|---|---|---|---|---|---|---|
| New York | 0 | 0 | 0 | 0 | 0 | 0 | 0 | 0 | 0 | 0 | 5 | 0 |
| Houston | 0 | 1 | 0 | 0 | 0 | 0 | 0 | 0 | X | 1 | 7 | 1 |
WP: Mike Scott (1–0) LP: Dwight Gooden (0–1)
HR: NYM – None.; HOU – Glenn Davis (1)

In Game 1, Scott allowed just 5 singles while reriting an LCS record-tying 14 batters via strikeout.

=== Game 2 ===
October 9 (Astrodome, Houston, Texas)

| Team | 1 | 2 | 3 | 4 | 5 | 6 | 7 | 8 | 9 | R | H | E |
|---|---|---|---|---|---|---|---|---|---|---|---|---|
| New York | 0 | 0 | 0 | 2 | 3 | 0 | 0 | 0 | 0 | 5 | 10 | 0 |
| Houston | 0 | 0 | 0 | 0 | 0 | 0 | 1 | 0 | 0 | 1 | 10 | 2 |
WP: Bob Ojeda (1–0) LP: Nolan Ryan (0–1)
HR: NYM – None.; HOU – None.

=== Game 3 ===
October 11 (Shea Stadium, Flushing, New York)

| Team | 1 | 2 | 3 | 4 | 5 | 6 | 7 | 8 | 9 | R | H | E |
|---|---|---|---|---|---|---|---|---|---|---|---|---|
| Houston | 2 | 2 | 0 | 0 | 0 | 0 | 1 | 0 | 0 | 5 | 8 | 1 |
| New York | 0 | 0 | 0 | 0 | 0 | 4 | 0 | 0 | 2 | 6 | 10 | 1 |
WP: Jesse Orosco (1–0) LP: Dave Smith (0–1)
HR: HOU – Bill Doran (1); NYM – Darryl Strawberry (1), Lenny Dykstra (1)

=== Game 4 ===
October 12 (Shea Stadium, Flushing, New York)

| Team | 1 | 2 | 3 | 4 | 5 | 6 | 7 | 8 | 9 | R | H | E |
|---|---|---|---|---|---|---|---|---|---|---|---|---|
| Houston | 0 | 2 | 0 | 0 | 1 | 0 | 0 | 0 | 0 | 3 | 4 | 1 |
| New York | 0 | 0 | 0 | 0 | 0 | 0 | 0 | 1 | 0 | 1 | 3 | 0 |
WP: Mike Scott (2–0) LP: Sid Fernandez (0–1)
HR: HOU – Alan Ashby (1), Dickie Thon (1); NYM – None.

=== Game 5 ===
October 14 (Shea Stadium, Flushing, New York)

| Team | 1 | 2 | 3 | 4 | 5 | 6 | 7 | 8 | 9 | 10 | 11 | 12 | R | H | E |
|---|---|---|---|---|---|---|---|---|---|---|---|---|---|---|---|
| Houston | 0 | 0 | 0 | 0 | 1 | 0 | 0 | 0 | 0 | 0 | 0 | 0 | 1 | 9 | 1 |
| New York | 0 | 0 | 0 | 0 | 1 | 0 | 0 | 0 | 0 | 0 | 0 | 1 | 2 | 4 | 0 |
WP: Jesse Orosco (2–0) LP: Charlie Kerfeld (0–1)
HRs: HOU – None. NYM – Darryl Strawberry (2)

=== Game 6 ===
October 15 (Astrodome, Houston, Texas)

| Team | 1 | 2 | 3 | 4 | 5 | 6 | 7 | 8 | 9 | 10 | 11 | 12 | 13 | 14 | 15 | 16 | R | H | E |
|---|---|---|---|---|---|---|---|---|---|---|---|---|---|---|---|---|---|---|---|
| New York | 0 | 0 | 0 | 0 | 0 | 0 | 0 | 0 | 3 | 0 | 0 | 0 | 0 | 1 | 0 | 3 | 7 | 11 | 0 |
| Houston | 3 | 0 | 0 | 0 | 0 | 0 | 0 | 0 | 0 | 0 | 0 | 0 | 0 | 1 | 0 | 2 | 6 | 11 | 1 |
WP: Jesse Orosco (3–0) LP: Aurelio López (0–1)
HRs: NYM – None. HOU – Billy Hatcher (1)

Game 6 of the 1986 NLCS still ranks as one of the most memorable baseball games of the 1980s, if not baseball (and certainly baseball postseason) history. Played at The Astrodome, the game went 16 innings with the Mets coming out on top 7–6. It was the highest scoring game of the series; in fact, the 16th inning alone featured more runs than three of the previous five games had in their entirety.

Game 6 was a must-win for both teams. The Astros had to have it because they were facing elimination. Even though they were up 3–2 in the series, the Mets regarded it as a must-win because they were scheduled to face Mike Scott again in Game 7. Scott had given up a grand total of 1 run in his first two starts of the series, and had dominated the Mets so completely that even the most optimistic Mets fans knew their chances of beating him in a potential Game 7 were slim. The end result was one of the greatest games in baseball history.

The Astros broke through first, and for a low scoring series like this, they broke through big, scoring three runs off a possibly tired Bob Ojeda in the bottom of the first. Ojeda settled down after that, however, and the Astros wouldn't score again for the next 12 innings. Meanwhile, Astros starter Bob Knepper was brilliant from the very first pitch, and the game headed to the 9th with Houston still seemingly comfortably ahead 3–0.

Just when it looked like the Mets would have to face the mighty Scott, however, their bats suddenly came to life. After pitching almost perfectly for the first eight innings, Knepper clearly tired in the 9th. Starting with a Lenny Dykstra lead off triple that barely evaded the glove of Hatcher in right center field, Knepper allowed three hits and recorded only one out, and left with the Astros clinging to a 3–2 lead.

The decision by Lanier not to bring in Smith to start the inning was talked about for years to come. Smith was firmly established as one of the best closers in the National League, but he had blown a save earlier in the series, taking both the blown save and the loss in Game 3 thanks to Dykstra's walkoff homer.

When Smith finally did appear, he was ineffective, walking two batters to load the bases and then allowing the tying run to score on a sacrifice fly by Ray Knight. In a matter of minutes, the previously raucous crowd of 45,718 had been almost completely silenced and extra innings had soon begun.

In the 14th, the Mets made their first bid to win. After Gary Carter opened with a single, a walk to Darryl Strawberry put two runners on with nobody out. After Knight forced Carter at third, Wally Backman drove a single to right. When Kevin Bass' throw to the plate sailed high over Alan Ashby's head to the screen, Strawberry scored. It looked like the end for the Astros, as Orosco came in to close them down.

With one out in the bottom of the 14th and the Houston fans with their heads in their hands, Billy Hatcher shocked everyone with a line drive home run off the left field foul pole. It was the first earned run allowed by the Mets bullpen in the entire series. Hatcher went 3 for 7 in the game, and his homer meant the Astros would be kept alive for at least one more inning. Both teams failed to score in the 15th, and the game went to the 16th inning, the most innings in playoff history at that time.

The 16th inning would be the deciding factor, and it was not an easy 16th for either pitching staff. The Mets appeared to take control of the game once again, this time coming up with 3 runs in the top half of the inning. The rally began with Strawberry receiving a gift double when Billy Hatcher and Bill Doran misplayed his towering fly ball with one out. When Knight followed with a single to right, a poor throw to the plate by Kevin Bass allowed the tiebreaking run to score, just as it had in the 14th. A walk, two wild pitches, and a single by Lenny Dykstra brought in two more runs, putting the Mets up 7–4. This sent some of the Houston faithful for the exits; those who stayed, however, almost witnessed the unthinkable.

Orosco struck out Craig Reynolds to open the inning, but a walk and two singles later, Houston had a run in and the tying run on base. Orosco induced Denny Walling to hit into a force play at second for the second out, but Glenn Davis singled home another run, bringing the Astros within a run. People everywhere were quiet as they watched Orosco face right fielder Kevin Bass with two outs and the tying run on second, and the winning run on first.

It was all up to Bass to drive in a run and tie the game. Orosco threw Bass six straight sliders; when Bass swung and missed the last of them, the epic series was over. Orosco was awarded the victory, marking the first time in postseason history a reliever won three games in a series. It would be a long winter for the Astros, but for the Mets, an even bigger trial awaited them. After taking two days off to recover from the exhausting series against Houston, the Mets began a legendary World Series against the Boston Red Sox, a series in which they would pull off one of the greatest comebacks of all time.

The Mets had won the series with a .189 batting average, the lowest average recorded by a winning team in a postseason series. Their pitching had been the key.

Scott's masterful performance in the series was, such that, in spite of pitching for the losing side, he was recognized with the NLCS Most Valuable Player Award (MVP), the first time in the 10-year history of the award history that a member of the losing team was so honored. Hence, Scott also became the first Astros player to receive a playoff award.

== Awards and achievements ==
=== Grand slams ===
| No. | Date | Astros batter | Venue | Inning | Pitcher | Opposing team | Box |
|---|---|---|---|---|---|---|---|
| 1 | April 12 | Craig Reynolds (Note: Pinch hitter) | Astrodome | 6 (Note: Tied score or took lead) | Rick Mahler | Atlanta Braves | |
| 2 | May 4 | Terry Puhl | Olympic Stadium | 3 | Bryn Smith | Montreal Expos | |
| 3 | June 14 | Phil Garner | Astrodome | 7 | Jeff Robinson | San Francisco Giants | |
| 4 | July 7 | Kevin Bass (Note: 1st MLB grand slam) | Olympic Stadium | 9 | Dan Schatzeder | Montreal Expos | |
| 5 | August 5 | Billy Hatcher | Dodger Stadium | 9 | Dennis Powell | Los Angeles Dodgers | |

=== Pitching achievements ===
==== Strikeout club ====
300 strikeout club
| Player | K | W–L | ERA | K/9 |
|---|---|---|---|---|
| Mike Scott | 306 | 18–10 | 2.22 | 10.0 |

==== No-hit game ====
| Date | Pitcher | IP | BB | BR | K | BF | Catcher | Final | Opponent | Venue | Plate umpire | Box |
|---|---|---|---|---|---|---|---|---|---|---|---|---|
| September 25, 1986 | Mike Scott | 9 | 2 | 3 | 13 | 30 | Alan Ashby | 2–0 | San Francisco Giants | Astrodome | Bob Engel | |
| September 25, 1986 | Scott: Game score: 98 • Win (18–10) | | | | | | | | | | | |

=== Awards ===
1986 Houston Astros award winners
| Name of award | | Recipient | Ref. |
|---|---|---|---|
| Associated Press (AP) Manager of the Year | | Hal Lanier | |
| Cy Young Award | | Mike Scott | |
| Fred Hartman Award for Long and Meritorious Service to Baseball | | Fred Hartman | |
| Houston Astros Most Valuable Player (MVP) | | Mike Scott | |
| Manager of the Year (Note: As determined by the Baseball Writers' Association of America (BBWAA).) | | Hal Lanier | |
| MLB All-Star Game | Reserve outfielder | Kevin Bass | |
| MLB All-Star Game | Reserve first baseman | Glenn Davis | |
| MLB All-Star Game | Reserve pitcher | Mike Scott | |
| MLB All-Star Game | Reserve pitcher | Dave Smith | |
| National League Championship Series Most Valuable Player (NLCS MVP) | | Mike Scott | |
| National League (NL) Player of the Month | June | Kevin Bass | |
| National League (NL) Player of the Week | April 30 | Phil Garner | |
| National League (NL) Player of the Week | June 26 | Kevin Bass | |
| National League (NL) Player of the Week | September 28 | Mike Scott | |
| Silver Slugger Award | First baseman | Glenn Davis | |
| The Sporting News | NL Manager of the Year | Hal Lanier | |
| The Sporting News | NL Pitcher of the Year | Mike Scott | |
| The Sporting News | NL All-Star Pitcher | Mike Scott | |

Other awards results

| Name of award | Voting recipient(s) (Team) | Ref. |
|---|---|---|
| NL Most Valuable Player | 1st—Schmidt (PHI) • 2nd—G. Davis (HOU) • 7th—Bass (HOU); Other Astros: 10th—Scott • 11th—Doran • 17th—D. Smith | |
| NL Rookie of the Year | 1st—Worrell (STL) • 4th—Kerfeld (HOU) • 7th—Deshaies (HOU) | |

=== League leaders ===
NL batting leaders

- Hit by pitch: Glenn Davis (8)
- cWPA (6.0): Glenn Davis
- Caught stealing (19): Bill Doran

NL pitching leaders

- Earned run average (ERA): Mike Scott (2.22)
- Shutouts: Bob Knepper & Mike Scott (5—tied)
- Strikeouts: Mike Scott (306)
- Walks plus hits per inning pitched (WHIP): Mike Scott (0.923)
- Wild pitches: Nolan Ryan (15)
- WPA/LI: Mike Scott (6.5)
- Wins above replacement (WAR): Mike Scott (8.2)

NL fielding leaders

- Total Zone Runs as RF (13): Kevin Bass
- Total Zone Runs as LF (7): José Cruz

== Minor league system ==
| Level | Team | League | Manager |
|---|---|---|---|
| AAA | Tucson Toros | Pacific Coast League | Carlos Alfonso |
| AA | Columbus Astros | Southern League | Dave Cripe, Chuck Taylor and Gary Tuck |
| A | Osceola Astros | Florida State League | Tom Wiedenbauer |
| A | Asheville Tourists | South Atlantic League | Ken Bolek |
| A-Short Season | Auburn Astros | New York–Penn League | Keith Bodie |
| Rookie | GCL Astros | Gulf Coast League | Julio Linares |

LEAGUE CHAMPIONS: Columbus

== See also ==
- 300 strikeout club
- List of Major League Baseball annual ERA leaders
- List of Major League Baseball annual shutout leaders
- List of Major League Baseball annual strikeout leaders
- List of Major League Baseball individual streaks
- List of Major League Baseball no-hitters
- List of Major League Baseball single-inning strikeout leaders
