= 1986 Major League Baseball postseason =

1986 Major League Baseball playoffs

Tournament details
- Dates: October 7–27, 1986
- Teams: 4

Final positions
- Champions: New York Mets (2nd title)
- Runners-up: Boston Red Sox

Tournament statistics
- Games played: 20
- Attendance: 945,520 (47,276 per game)
- Most HRs: Four tied (3)
- Most SBs: Darryl Strawberry & Mookie Wilson (NYM) (4)
- Most Ks (as pitcher): Roger Clemens (BOS) (28)

Awards
- MVP: Ray Knight (NYM)

The 1986 Major League Baseball postseason was the playoff tournament of Major League Baseball for the 1986 season. The winners of each division advance to the postseason and face each other in a League Championship Series to determine the pennant winners that face each other in the World Series.

In the American League, the Boston Red Sox returned to the postseason for the first time since 1975, and the California Angels were making their third postseason appearance in the last eight years. This would be the Angels’ last postseason appearance until 2002.

In the National League, the New York Mets made their first appearance since 1973, and the Houston Astros were making their third appearance in the last seven years. This was Houston’s last postseason appearance until 1997.

The playoffs began on October 7, 1986, and concluded on October 27, 1986, with the Mets defeating the Red Sox in seven games in the 1986 World Series. It was the Mets' first title since 1969 and their second overall.

== Teams ==
American League Teams National League Teams

The following teams qualified for the postseason:

=== American League ===
- Boston Red Sox – 95–66, AL East champions
- California Angels – 92–70, AL West champions

=== National League ===
- New York Mets – 108–54, NL East champions
- Houston Astros – 96–66, NL West champions

== Playoff bracket ==
League Championship Series (ALCS, NLCS)
East | Boston | 4
West | California | 3
East | NY Mets | 4
West | Houston | 2

World Series
AL | Boston | 3
NL | NY Mets | 4

== American League Championship Series ==
=== Boston Red Sox vs. California Angels ===
The East division champion held home field advantage for the third consecutive year in the ALCS. Between 1969–84, the home field advantage alternated between the West in odd-numbered years and the East in even-numbered years. In 1987, that alternation resumed and continued through 1993.

Boston won the series, 4–3.

| Game | Date | Score | Location | Time | Attendance |
|---|---|---|---|---|---|
| 1 | October 7 | California Angels – 8, Boston Red Sox – 1 | Fenway Park | 2:52 | 32,993 |
| 2 | October 8 | California Angels – 2, Boston Red Sox – 9 | Fenway Park | 2:47 | 32,786 |
| 3 | October 10 | Boston Red Sox – 3, California Angels – 5 | Anaheim Stadium | 2:48 | 64,206 |
| 4 | October 11 | Boston Red Sox – 3, California Angels – 4 (11) | Anaheim Stadium | 3:50 | 64,223 |
| 5 | October 12 | Boston Red Sox – 7, California Angels – 6 (11) | Anaheim Stadium | 3:54 | 64,223 |
| 6 | October 14 | California Angels – 4, Boston Red Sox – 10 | Fenway Park | 3:23 | 32,998 |
| 7 | October 15 | California Angels – 1, Boston Red Sox – 8 | Fenway Park | 2:39 | 33,001 |

This was the first postseason meeting between the Angels and Red Sox. The Red Sox overcame a 3–1 series deficit to defeat the Angels in seven games, returning to the World Series for the first time since 1975.

Mike Witt pitched a five-hit complete game and out-dueled Roger Clemens in his postseason debut as the Angels blew out the Red Sox in Game 1. The Red Sox then turned the tables on them in Game 2, as Bruce Hurst pitched a complete game in a blowout victory for the Red Sox to even the series headed to Anaheim. In Game 3, the Red Sox lead early, but the Angels came back to win as Dick Schofield hit a two-out home run in the bottom of the seventh to put the Angels ahead for good. Game 4 was a long and grueling extra-inning contest won by the Angels to take a 3–1 series lead, thanks to a walk-off RBI single from Bobby Grich which scored Jerry Narron in the bottom of the eleventh.

Game 5 was the most memorable contest of the series - the Angels brought the Red Sox to the brink of elimination as they were a strike away from their first pennant despite the Red Sox cutting their lead to one. However, Dave Henderson hit a two-run home run off Angels reliever Donnie Moore to put the Red Sox back in the lead. However, the Angels tied the game, forcing extra innings once again. Then in the top of the eleventh, Henderson hit a sacrifice fly to score Don Baylor, which put the Red Sox ahead for good, as Calvin Schiraldi pitched a one-two-three eleventh to earn a save, sending the series back to Boston in one of the most improbable victories in postseason history.

In Game 6, the Red Sox blew out the Angels to force a seventh game. Clemens redeemed himself in Game 7, pitching seven solid innings in a Red Sox’ blowout win to help secure the pennant, earning his first of many postseason victories. Game 7 was Reggie Jackson’s final postseason game.

This was the third straight loss for the Angels in the ALCS. The Angels would eventually earn redemption in the ALCS in 2002, where they defeated the Minnesota Twins in five games en route to a World Series title.

The Red Sox would make a return trip to the ALCS two years later, but were swept by the Oakland Athletics. They would eventually win the pennant again in 2004 over their archrival in the New York Yankees in seven games en route to a World Series title after trailing three games to none in the series.

The Angels and Red Sox would meet each other again in the ALDS in 2004, 2007, 2008 and 2009, with the Red Sox winning the first three series, and the Angels winning the last one.

== National League Championship Series ==
=== Houston Astros vs. New York Mets ===
New York won the series, 4–2.

| Game | Date | Score | Location | Time | Attendance |
|---|---|---|---|---|---|
| 1 | October 8 | New York Mets – 0, Houston Astros – 1 | Astrodome | 2:56 | 44,131 |
| 2 | October 9 | New York Mets – 5, Houston Astros – 1 | Astrodome | 2:40 | 44,391 |
| 3 | October 11 | Houston Astros – 5, New York Mets – 6 | Shea Stadium | 2:55 | 55,052 |
| 4 | October 12 | Houston Astros – 3, New York Mets – 1 | Shea Stadium | 2:23 | 55,038 |
| 5 | October 14 | Houston Astros – 1, New York Mets – 2 (12) | Shea Stadium | 3:45 | 54,986 |
| 6 | October 15 | New York Mets – 7, Houston Astros – 6 (16) | Astrodome | 4:42 | 45,718 |

The Mets defeated the Astros in six games to return to the World Series for the first time since 1973.

Houston's Mike Scott out-dueled New York's Dwight Gooden as the Astros took Game 1, with Scott pitching a five-hit complete-game shutout. Bob Ojeda out-dueled former 1969 Mets alum Nolan Ryan in a complete-game performance in Game 2 as the Mets won 4–1 to even the series headed to Queens. Game 3 was an offensive slugfest which was won by the Mets as Lenny Dykstra hit a walk-off two-run home run in the bottom of the ninth. The Astros evened the series in Game 4 as Scott pitched a three-hit complete game despite being on three-days rest. Game 5 was an ugly and low-scoring extra-inning battle that was won by the Mets as Gary Carter hit a walk-off RBI single in the bottom of the twelfth, giving the Mets a 3–2 series lead headed back to Houston. Game 5 would ultimately be Nolan Ryan's final postseason game.

Game 6 was the most notable contest of the series, as it went sixteen innings, the most of any postseason game outside of the World Series until 2005. The Mets tied the game with three runs scored in the top of the ninth. The game remained scoreless until the top of the fourteenth, when Wally Backman hit a go-ahead RBI single off Aurelio López to give the Mets a one-run lead. In the bottom of the inning, the Mets were two outs away from securing the pennant, but Houston's Billy Hatcher hit a solo home run to tie the game. The game went scoreless through the fifteenth, then in the top of the sixteenth, Darryl Strawberry doubled to lead off against López, followed by Ray Knight's single that scored Strawberry to put the Mets in the lead for good. Jeff Calhoun then replaced López and threw two wild pitches, the second scoring Knight to put the Mets up two. Dykstra then singled in Backman, who had walked, to extend their lead to three. However, the game was not over yet. In the bottom of the sixteenth, the Astros rallied once again when with one out, Davey Lopes drew a pinch-hit walk, followed by Bill Doran's single. Hatcher then singled in Lopes to make it 7–5, after which Denny Walling hit into a fielder's choice for the second out. Davis followed with a single to centerfield that landed in front of a charging Dykstra, that brought home Doran to cut it to 7–6, moving Walling into scoring position. The tying run was in scoring position and the winning run was at first base, and would-be Game 7 starter Scott was waiting in the wings. Jesse Orosco, opposite Kevin Bass, eventually found himself at a full count. A strike away from a pennant, and simultaneously a misplaced pitch away from loading the bases, Orosco struck out Bass to end the threat, the game and the series as the Mets won the pennant. According to Orosco, prior to the at-bat against Bass, Keith Hernandez ordered him to throw nothing but breaking balls to Bass, telling Orosco, "If you throw one fastball to this guy, I'm going to kick your ass."

The Astros would eventually return to the NLCS in 2004, but they fell to the St. Louis Cardinals in seven games after being ten outs away from the pennant in Game 7. They would eventually win their first pennant in 2005 against the Cardinals in six games before falling in the World Series, which would be their only one as a member of the National League.

The Mets returned to the NLCS in 1988, but were upset by the eventual World Series champion Los Angeles Dodgers in seven games. They would win their next pennant in 2000 against the St. Louis Cardinals in five games before coming up short in the World Series.

== 1986 World Series ==
=== Boston Red Sox (AL) vs. New York Mets (NL) ===
New York won the series, 4–3.

| Game | Date | Score | Location | Time | Attendance |
|---|---|---|---|---|---|
| 1 | October 18 | Boston Red Sox – 1, New York Mets – 0 | Shea Stadium | 2:59 | 55,076 |
| 2 | October 19 | Boston Red Sox – 9, New York Mets – 3 | Shea Stadium | 3:36 | 55,063 |
| 3 | October 21 | New York Mets – 7, Boston Red Sox – 1 | Fenway Park | 2:58 | 33,595 |
| 4 | October 22 | New York Mets – 6, Boston Red Sox – 2 | Fenway Park | 3:22 | 33,920 |
| 5 | October 23 | New York Mets – 2, Boston Red Sox – 4 | Fenway Park | 3:09 | 34,010 |
| 6 | October 25 | Boston Red Sox – 5, New York Mets – 6 (10) | Shea Stadium | 4:02 | 55,078 |
| 7 | October 27† | Boston Red Sox – 5, New York Mets – 8 | Shea Stadium | 3:11 | 55,032 |

†: postponed from October 26 due to rain

This was the fifth meeting between teams from Boston and New York City for a major professional sports championship. This previously occurred in two Stanley Cup Finals (1929, 1972) and two previous World Series (1912, 1916) which the Red Sox won against the Giants and Dodgers respectively. In what is widely considered to be one of the greatest World Series ever played, the Mets overcame a two-games-to-none series deficit to defeat the Red Sox in seven games, winning their first title since 1969.

Bruce Hurst pitched eight innings of shutout ball as the Red Sox stole Game 1 on the road. In Game 2, the Red Sox offense chased Dwight Gooden from the mound in a blowout win, giving the Red Sox a 2–0 series lead headed to Fenway Park. The Red Sox looked poised to pull off an improbable upset, however, the Mets responded. Bob Ojeda pitched seven solid innings as the Mets blew out the Red Sox in Game 3. In Game 4, the Mets jumped out to a big lead early thanks to a pair of two-run homers from Gary Carter and Lenny Dykstra and maintained it, winning 6–2 to even the series. Hurst pitched a complete game for the Red Sox in Game 5 as they won 4–2 to take a 3-2 series lead heading back to Queens, now one win away from their first title since 1918.

Game 6 was the most notable contest of the series, as the Mets rallied from a two run-deficit in the bottom of the tenth to tie the game, despite having two outs and no one on base. The Red Sox were twice one strike away from securing the championship, but failed to close out the inning as the Mets won off an error by Boston first baseman Bill Buckner to force a seventh game.

In Game 7, the Red Sox again took an early 3–0 lead and were ten outs away from the championship; however, the Mets scored six runs across the sixth and seventh innings to take the lead for good. The Red Sox managed to cut the Mets' lead to one in the top of the eighth, however the Mets would score two more runs in the bottom of the inning, and closed out the game in the ninth to secure the title.

Due to the Mets claiming the championship in Game 7, the Game 6 collapse entered baseball lore as part of the Curse of the Bambino superstition used to explain the Red Sox's championship drought after the 1918 World Series. As of 2026, this is the last time that the Red Sox lost in the World Series. They would eventually break the Curse of the Bambino in the 2004 World Series, as they swept the St. Louis Cardinals to win their first title since 1918.

The 1986 Mets were the last team to win the World Series after being a strike away from elimination twice in Game 6 and trailing in Game 7 until the St. Louis Cardinals did so in 2011. The Mets returned to the World Series in 2000, but they fell to their crosstown rivals in the New York Yankees in five games, becoming the last victim of a Yankee three-peat from 1998 to 2000.

== Broadcasting ==
ABC televised both LCS nationally in the United States. NBC then aired the World Series.
