= Tom Funk =

American baseball player

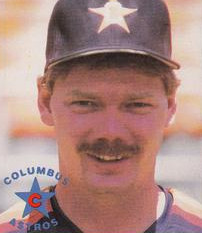
- Funk in 1988
- Pitcher
- Born: March 13, 1962 (age 64); Kansas City, Missouri
- Batted: Left Threw: Left

MLB debut
- July 24, 1986, for the Houston Astros

Last MLB appearance
- August 23, 1986, for the Houston Astros

MLB statistics
- Win–loss record: 0–0
- Earned run average: 6.48
- Strikeouts: 2
- Stats at Baseball Reference

Teams
- Houston Astros (1986)

Thomas James Funk (born March 13, 1962) is a former Major League Baseball pitcher who played for the Houston Astros during the 1986 season. He appeared in eight games and enjoyed early success before faltering and being sent down to the minors. He would never again pitch in the big leagues. The Astros would go on to win the 1986 National League Western Division title without him.

== Background ==
Funk was born in Kansas City, Missouri, and attended Winnetonka High School and Northwest Missouri State University. In 1982, he played collegiate summer baseball with the Chatham A's of the Cape Cod Baseball League. The Astros selected him in the 28th round of the June 1983 free agent draft. The 6' 2" 210 lbs left-hander quickly began to work his way through the Houston minor league system. He was enjoying a good year with the Columbus Astros when he was called to the parent club.

== 1986 season ==
Upon reaching the Majors, Funk quickly filled the role of a left-handed reliever for the Astros bullpen. The team was in the middle of a pennant race and had been lacking a lefty since Frank DiPino had been traded to the Chicago Cubs. In his first seven games Funk would record a stellar ERA of 2.45. On August 23, 1986, he was summoned from the bullpen at Busch Memorial Stadium to relieve Mike Scott in what was a 3-1 St. Louis Cardinals lead. Funk would proceed to get hammered during the course of the inning. He surrendered four earned runs and helped pad the Cardinals lead to 7 to 1. Funk's ERA ballooned to 6.48 and he was quickly demoted back to the minors at the behest of manager Hal Lanier. Jeff Calhoun would assume his spot as the left-handed reliever in the Astros bullpen for the remainder of the season. For the year, and his career, Funk finished with no decisions or saves over 8⅓ innings in eight games with six walks, two strikeouts (Mariano Duncan and Len Matuszek of the Los Angeles Dodgers), and the aforementioned 6.48 earned run average.

== Debut game ==
Funk appeared in his first big league game on Thursday, July 24, 1986, in a 9-3 Houston win over the Philadelphia Phillies at Veterans Stadium. He pitched the 9th and last inning of the game. The first batter he faced, John Russell, hit a home run.
