= Jeff Calhoun =

Jeff Calhoun may refer to:

- Jeff Calhoun (baseball)
- Jeff Calhoun (choreographer)
