= Abilene Prairie Dogs =

- Logo

Information
- Location: Abilene, Texas
- Founded: 1995
- Disbanded: 2012
- League championships: 1996 (TLL)
- Division championships: 0
- Former name: Abilene Prairie Dogs
- Former leagues: Texas–Louisiana League (1995–99); North American League (2012)
- Former ballparks: Crutcher Scott Field (1995–99); Walt Driggers Field (2012)
- Colors: Burgundy, gold, white, black, tan
- Ownership: Byron Pierce
- General manager: D.R. Smith
- Website: www.abileneprairiedogs.com

The Abilene Prairie Dogs were an independent professional baseball team based in Abilene, Texas. They were members of the Texas–Louisiana League from 1995 to 1999, and returned for one season in the North American League in 2012.

== Team history ==
=== Texas–Louisiana League (1995–1999) ===
In 1995, the Prairie Dogs, or Dogs as the fans commonly called them, began play at Abilene Christian University's Crutcher Scott Field. Under the management of Charlie Kerfeld, the Prairie Dogs accumulated a dismal 40-60 record, earning them the last place in their League. 1996 brought a new manager, Phil Stephenson, who led the Dogs to a League Championship with a 67-31 record. In 1997, the Dogs returned to last place standing (36-52) under the management of Barry Jones. Jones rallied the Dogs in 1998, to take a fourth-place position with a 39-45 record for the year. In 1999, Jones moved on to the Ozark Mountain Ducks, and was replaced by Dan Madsen, who took the Dogs to a 46-38 third place League standing in their final year of play.

=== North American League (2012) ===
It was announced on January 31, 2012 that the Abilene Prairie Dogs would return to play in June 2012 as a part of the southern division of the North American Baseball League. Their home field would be Walt Driggers Field, on the campus of McMurry University, in Abilene. The Prairie Dogs went 34-53 and did not play their last eight games (all on the road) as they struggled with financial and attendance issues. The club announced in early 2013 that they would not return but hoped to play in 2014. They did not.
