= Rafael Montalvo (baseball) =

Puerto Rican baseball player (born 1964)

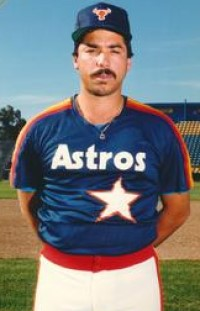
- Pitcher
- Born: March 31, 1964 (age 62); Río Piedras, Puerto Rico
- Batted: Right Threw: Right

Professional debut
- MLB: April 13, 1986, for the Houston Astros
- CPBL: September 5, 1992, for the Wei Chuan Dragons

Last appearance
- MLB: April 13, 1986, for the Houston Astros
- CPBL: July 19, 1998, for the Mercuries Tigers

MLB statistics
- Win–loss record: 0–0
- Earned run average: 9.00
- Strikeouts: 0

CPBL statistics
- Win–loss record: 21–17
- Earned run average: 3.78
- Strikeouts: 130
- Stats at Baseball Reference

Teams
- Houston Astros (1986); Wei Chuan Dragons (1992); China Times Eagles (1997); Mercuries Tigers (1998)

Rafael Edgardo Montalvo Torres (born March 31, 1964) is a Puerto Rican former professional baseball pitcher. He played in Major League Baseball (MLB) for the Houston Astros, and in the Chinese Professional Baseball League (CPBL) for the Wei Chuan Dragons, China Times Eagles, and Mercuries Tigers. His time in the big leagues consisted of only 1 inning in 1 game at the age of 22. Montalvo holds the record with several other pitchers for having the shortest career.

== Career ==
Montalvo's one appearance came on Sunday, April 13, 1986, as a member of the Houston Astros. He pitched one inning against the Atlanta Braves and allowed one run, one hit, and two walks. Shortly thereafter he was demoted to the Tucson Toros in the minor leagues. After the Astros reached the 1986 NLCS he was awarded $500 as his share of the winnings.

=== The game ===
Montalvo was brought into the game to pitch the top of the 8th inning in front of 8,739 fans at the Astrodome. With Montalvo on the mound, Glenn Hubbard grounded out to the pitcher; Ozzie Virgil flied out to left; Omar Moreno tripled; and Rafael Ramirez grounded out to the pitcher. In the 9th inning Dale Murphy walked and Bob Horner walked. Frank DiPino then replaced Montalvo. The game ended with an Atlanta Braves 8–7 victory. Houston Chronicle beat writer Neil Hohlfield claimed that Montalvo made nice "goalie like" plays on balls hit at him by Hubbard and Ramirez, but did not have much control of his pitches.

== Post-playing career ==
In 2007, Montalvo served as the pitching coach for the minor league Hudson Valley Renegades in the Tampa Bay Devil Rays system. He now resides in Texas with his wife.
