= Charlie Kerfeld =

American baseball player (born 1963)

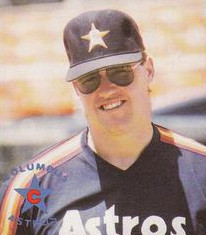
- Kerfeld in 1988
- Pitcher
- Born: September 28, 1963 (age 61); Knob Noster, Missouri, U.S.
- Batted: Right Threw: Right

MLB debut
- September 28, 1985, for the Houston Astros

Last MLB appearance
- July 23, 1990, for the Atlanta Braves

MLB statistics
- Win–loss record: 18–9
- Earned run average: 4.24
- Strikeouts: 155
- Stats at Baseball Reference

Teams
- Houston Astros (1985–1990); Atlanta Braves (1990)

Charles Patrick Kerfeld (born September 28, 1963) is an American former Major League Baseball (MLB) relief pitcher. He grew up in Carson City, Nevada. Kerfeld played baseball for the Carson City High Senators. After he entered major league baseball, almost all of his career was spent with the Houston Astros. With the Astros, Kerfeld became known for a quirky sense of humor. He pitched for the Houston organization between 1985 and 1990, winning a division title with the Astros in 1986. He was in the minor leagues in 1988 and 1989 before briefly returning to the major leagues with the Houston Astros and Atlanta Braves in 1990. After his retirement, Kerfeld entered minor league baseball as a coach. He holds a front office position for the Philadelphia Phillies.

== Career ==
Kerfeld was the Astros' first pick (5th overall) in the secondary phase of 1982 draft, and fared well his first year at Asheville, and his second at Columbus, with sub 3.00 ERAs and 30 wins. He led the 1983 Sally League in wins, complete games, and innings pitched, while finishing second in strikeouts, earning Pitcher of the Year honors. Though he struggled initially at the triple-A level, he eventually found his bearings and even earned a July 1985 call-up to the major league club at the age of 21.

Kerfeld made the big league roster out of spring training in 1986, and had a career year posting an 11-2 record and a 2.59 ERA as the setup man for closer Dave Smith. His unexpected performance that year was a key reason the Astros won the National League Western Division title that season. He led the National League in won-loss percentage and finished fourth in the Rookie of the Year balloting. Kerfeld capped his season by pitching four innings and giving up a run in the NLCS. He took the loss in Game 5 when Gary Carter slapped Kerfeld's twelfth-inning pitch for a single, scoring Wally Backman.

Kerfeld began 1987 with the Astros, but was sent down to Tucson on April 26 after 11 games after posting an 0 – 2 record and a 6.67 ERA. After being taken out of a May game in Tucson, Kerfeld flung the baseball, underhanded but forcefully, at Tucson manager Bob Didier. The manager fined Kerfeld and suspended him for two games. Tucson pitching coach expressed frustration with Kerfeld, saying, "A lot of things have been said. A lot of things have been done. But very little sinks in."

Later, Kerfeld walked away from the Tucson team for a day after Rocky Childress was called up to the Astros. Kerfeld thought that he should have been called up. He said that he hastily spoke to Astros general manager Dick Wagner and said things that he regretted. In mid-July, Wagner said that Kerfeld's attitude and pitching had improved and that his weight was the biggest factor keeping him from the major leagues. He went 4 – 4 at Tucson with a 4.74, and was briefly recalled to Houston before going on the DL for two months with calcium deposits in his elbow. He pitched effectively in three games in late September, and looked to be rounding back into his stellar 1986 form.

Kerfeld, battling elbow, neck and weight problems, struggled in the minors in 1988 and 1989. He was on the Astros' Opening Day 1990 roster, but appeared in only five games, going 0 – 2 with a horrendous 16.20 ERA. His last game for the Astros was April 19, 1990. Ten days later, Kerfeld was traded to the Atlanta Braves for outfielder Kevin Dean and pitcher Lee Johnson. He pitched 30 innings in relief for the Braves that season, but was released during the offseason. He was signed by the Detroit Tigers and pitched briefly for their AA affiliate the London Tigers in 1991, but retired following that season.

=== Antics ===
A fan favorite, Kerfeld was known for his quirky sense of humor and bullpen antics. When asked in 1987 what he would do if he had only a week to live, Kerfeld replied, "I'd get Hulk Hogan, Brian Bosworth, Charles Barkley and I'd have a four-man tag team match with the Four Horsemen." Pondering alternative career options after a 1988 shoulder surgery, Kerfeld said, "Arena Football is first. Then the World Wrestling Federation. Maybe go back to college and get a brain surgery degree. Or become an assistant clubhouse man. Or go to Harry Wendelstedt's umpiring school."

When Kerfeld, whose uniform number was 37, learned that Jim Deshaies had signed for US$110,000 in 1987, he asked for and received $110,037.37 plus 37 boxes of orange Jell-O. On March 1, 1987, Kerfeld declared he would buy up 3,000 tickets per game to give away to charity causes. Without a discount, which the Astros didn't discuss, the cost for the seats would total as much as $1.6 million. Unable to afford that on a $110,000 salary, Kerfeld backed down from the offer.

He is remembered for his lucky Jetsons tee shirt (which he wore under his uniform when he pitched because the Jetsons' dog was named Astro) and for occasionally donning a rubber Coneheads mask in the bullpen along with fellow relievers Larry Andersen and Dave Smith. Coming to the ballpark, he often wore such things as pink high-tops and a Rambo cammies outfit.

Kerfeld gained fame for giving a drunken interview live to Bill Worrell and HSE in the Astros locker room after they clinched the NL West on September 25, 1986. The display was typical of his good nature and gregarious manner. Kerfeld was seen drinking a Busch beer during the interview, and then later pouring it on Nolan Ryan while Ryan was giving an interview with Milo Hamilton. Ryan retaliated by spraying champagne in Kerfeld's face. The clip can be found on the website YouTube.

== Post-playing career ==
Kerfeld remained in baseball managing in the minor leagues, including a brief stint with the Abilene Prairie Dogs of the Texas–Louisiana League. He was the Western League manager of the year in 1998 and in 2001-02. In November 2006, he became a special assistant to the general manager for the Philadelphia Phillies. As of August 2013, Kerfeld is a senior advisor to the general manager for the team.
