= Kevin Bass =

American baseball player (born 1959)

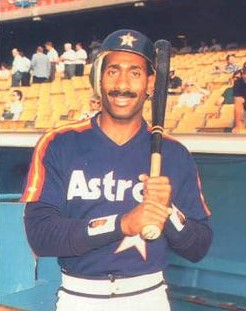
- Outfielder
- Born: May 12, 1959 (age 66); Redwood City, California, U.S.
- Batted: Switch Threw: Right

MLB debut
- April 9, 1982, for the Milwaukee Brewers

Last MLB appearance
- October 1, 1995, for the Baltimore Orioles

MLB statistics
- Batting average: .270
- Home runs: 118
- Runs batted in: 611
- Stats at Baseball Reference

Teams
- Milwaukee Brewers (1982); Houston Astros (1982–1989); San Francisco Giants (1990–1992); New York Mets (1992); Houston Astros (1993–1994); Baltimore Orioles (1995)

Career highlights and awards
- All-Star (1986)

Kevin Charles Bass (born May 12, 1959) is an American former professional baseball right fielder who played in Major League Baseball for the Milwaukee Brewers (1982), Houston Astros (1982–1989, 1993–1994), San Francisco Giants (1990–1992), New York Mets (1992), and Baltimore Orioles (1995).

== Career ==
The Milwaukee Brewers selected Bass in the second round of the 1977 Major League Baseball draft. He made his major league debut on April 9, 1982 against the Toronto Blue Jays, appearing as a pinch hitter and flying out to center field in the eighth inning. Bass spent most of the 1982 season with the Triple-A Vancouver Canadians, batting .315 with 17 home runs and 65 RBI in 102 games. On August 30, 1982, he was traded to the Houston Astros with Frank DiPino and Mike Madden for Don Sutton. Bass appeared in 30 combined major league games in his first major league season, recording one hit in 33 at bats (.030) and scoring six runs.

Bass became a regular starter for the Astros in 1985, batting .269 with 27 doubles, five triples, 16 home runs and 68 RBI in 150 games. He had his best season in 1986 for an Astros team that narrowly missed a World Series appearance. Bass was named to the 1986 National League All-Star team, pacing the Astros with a .311 batting average, 20 home runs, 79 RBI, 22 stolen bases, and sterling defensive play. In Game 6 of the epic 1986 NLCS, he struck out swinging with men on first and second in the 16th inning, sealing a 7–6 victory for the Mets, allowing them to advance to the 1986 World Series.

On August 3, 1987, versus the San Francisco Giants, Bass became the 15th switch hitter in major league history to hit a home run from each side of the plate in the same game. In 1989, Bass hit two grand slams in the season. The first was a walk-off homer off Chicago Cubs closer Mitch Williams, turning a 4–4 tie into an 8–4 Astros victory on August 20. The second homer, against Atlanta Braves reliever Mark Eichhorn on September 20, created a tie game that the Astros won in 14 innings.

On November 16, 1989, Bass signed a three-year, $5.25 million contract with the San Francisco Giants. On May 28, 1990, he was placed on the disabled list with left knee tendinitis. He subsequently underwent arthroscopic knee surgery to repair fractured cartilage in the knee, and was expected to miss three months. Bass made his return to the Giants' lineup on September 5. He hit .252 with seven home runs and 32 RBI in his first season as a Giant. In 1991, Bass batted .233 with 10 home runs and 40 RBI while playing in 124 games.

On August 8, 1992, Bass was traded to the New York Mets in exchange for a player to be named later (Rob Katzaroff). He batted a combined .269 with 23 doubles, five triples, nine home runs, 39 RBI and 14 stolen bases in 135 games with the Giants and Mets.

Bass signed a one-year, $500,000 contract to return to the Houston Astros on January 6, 1993. In 111 games, he hit .284 with three home runs and 37 RBI. On December 7, 1993, he re-signed with the Astros, and hit .310 with six home runs and 35 RBI in 82 games during the strike-shortened 1994 season.

Days prior to the 1995 season, Bass signed with the Baltimore Orioles on April 18. He hit .244 with five home runs and 32 RBI in 111 games. Bass played his final MLB game on October 1, 1995, finishing 1-for-2 with a walk in a 4–0 win over the Detroit Tigers.

== Career statistics ==
In 1571 games over 14 seasons, Bass posted a .270 batting average (1,308-for-4,839) with 609 runs, 248 doubles, 40 triples, 118 home runs, 611 RBI, 151 stolen bases, 357 base on balls, .323 on-base percentage and .411 slugging percentage. He recorded a .982 fielding percentage at all three outfield positions.

== Personal life ==
Born in Redwood City, California, Bass attended Menlo School before being drafted. His favorite team growing up was the San Francisco Giants.

Two of Kevin's sons were selected in the 2007 MLB draft. Garrett (Jacksonville State University) was selected by the Washington Nationals in the 42nd round (1,249th overall) and played a couple of seasons in their organization before spending time in the independent minor leagues. Justin (Clements High School) was taken by the Los Angeles Angels in the 21st round (658th overall) and spent several seasons in Rookie and A League baseball.

Bass is a cousin of former American football player James Lofton. Bass is also the nephew of the late Stan Johnson, a former professional baseball player who played for the White Sox and the Athletics organizations.

== See also ==
- Houston Astros award winners and league leaders

Preceded by Hubie Brooks	National League Player of the Month; June, 1986	Succeeded by Eric Davis
