= 1997 Major League Baseball postseason =

1997 Major League Baseball playoffs

Tournament details
- Dates: September 30 – October 26, 1997
- Teams: 8

Final positions
- Champions: Florida Marlins (1st title)
- Runners-up: Cleveland Indians

Tournament statistics
- Most HRs: Sandy Alomar (CLE) (5)
- Most SBs: Omar Vizquel (CLE) (9)
- Most Ks (as pitcher): Mike Mussina (BAL) (41)

Awards
- MVP: Liván Hernández (FLA)

The 1997 Major League Baseball postseason was the playoff tournament of Major League Baseball for the 1997 season. The winners of the League Division Series would move on to the League Championship Series to determine the pennant winners that face each other in the World Series. This was the last edition of the postseason in which teams were not seeded by their win-loss record.

In the American League, the New York Yankees and Cleveland Indians returned to the postseason for the third year in a row, the Baltimore Orioles returned to the postseason for the second straight year (which would be their last until 2012), and the Seattle Mariners returned to the postseason for the second time in three years.

In the National League, the Atlanta Braves made their sixth straight postseason appearance, the Houston Astros made their first postseason appearance since 1986, the Florida Marlins made their first postseason appearance four years into their existence, and the San Francisco Giants returned to the postseason for the first time since 1989.

The postseason began on September 30, 1997, and ended on October 26, 1997, with the Marlins defeating the Indians in seven games in the 1997 World Series. It was the Marlins' first championship in franchise history.

== Playoff seeds ==
American League Teams National League Teams

The following teams qualified for the postseason:

=== American League ===
- Baltimore Orioles – 98–64, AL East champions
- Cleveland Indians – 86–75, AL Central champions
- Seattle Mariners – 90–72, AL West champions
- New York Yankees – 96–66

Home-field advantage priority order: East, Central, West

=== National League ===
- Atlanta Braves – 101–61, NL East champions
- Houston Astros – 84–78, NL Central champions
- San Francisco Giants – 90–72, NL West champions
- Florida Marlins – 92–70

Home-field advantage priority order: West, Central, East

== Playoff bracket ==
Division Series (ALDS, NLDS)
C	Cleveland	3
WC	NY Yankees	2
American League
E	Baltimore	3
W	Seattle	1
E	Atlanta	3
C	Houston	0
National League
W	San Francisco	0
WC	Florida	3

League Championship Series (ALCS, NLCS)
C	Cleveland	4
E	Baltimore	2
E	Atlanta	2
WC	Florida	4

World Series
AL	Cleveland	3
NL	Florida	4

== American League Division Series ==
=== Baltimore Orioles vs. Seattle Mariners ===
Baltimore won the series, 3–1.

Game	Date	Score	Location	Time	Attendance
1	October 1	Baltimore Orioles – 9, Seattle Mariners – 3	Kingdome	3:14	59,579
2	October 2	Baltimore Orioles – 9, Seattle Mariners – 3	Kingdome	3:25	59,309
3	October 4	Seattle Mariners – 4, Baltimore Orioles – 2	Oriole Park at Camden Yards	3:26	49,137
4	October 5	Seattle Mariners – 1, Baltimore Orioles – 3	Oriole Park at Camden Yards	2:42	48,766

The Orioles defeated the Mariners in four games to return to the ALCS for the second straight year.

Mike Mussina pitched seven solid innings as the Orioles blew out the Mariners in Game 1 on the road. The Orioles prevailed in another blowout in Game 2 to take a 2-0 series lead headed back home. Game 2 was the last postseason game ever played at the Kingdome. Jeff Fassero pitched eight innings of shutout baseball and the Seattle bullpen stopped a late rally by the Orioles to give the Mariners the win in Game 3. Game 4 was a pitchers’ duel between Mussina and Randy Johnson, which would be won by the former as the Orioles narrowly prevailed to close out the series. This would be the last playoff series win by the Orioles until 2014.

=== Cleveland Indians vs. New York Yankees ===
Cleveland won the series, 3–2.

Game	Date	Score	Location	Time	Attendance
1	September 30	Cleveland Indians – 6, New York Yankees – 8	Yankee Stadium (I)	3:28	57,398
2	October 2	Cleveland Indians – 7, New York Yankees – 5	Yankee Stadium (I)	3:32	57,360
3	October 4	New York Yankees – 6, Cleveland Indians – 1	Jacobs Field	2:59	45,274
4	October 5	New York Yankees – 2, Cleveland Indians – 3	Jacobs Field	3:22	45,231
5	October 6	New York Yankees – 3, Cleveland Indians – 4	Jacobs Field	3:29	45,203

This was the first postseason meeting between the Yankees and Indians. The Indians knocked out the defending World Series champion Yankees in five games to return to the ALCS for the second time in three years.

Game 1 was an offensive shootout between both teams, which would be won by the Yankees as Derek Jeter, Tim Raines, Tino Martinez, and Paul O'Neill all hit home runs. Game 2 was another slugfest between both teams, which would be won by the Indians as they evened the series headed home. In Game 3, David Wells pitched a complete game as the Yankees won 6-1, capped off by a grand slam from O'Neill. In Game 4, the Yankees jumped out to an early lead and were four outs away from advancing to the ALCS, but the Indians would tie the game thanks to home runs from David Justice and Sandy Alomar Jr., and would win the game in the bottom of the ninth thanks to an RBI single from Omar Vizquel, forcing a decisive fifth game. The Indians would narrowly prevail in Game 5 as their bullpen stopped a late rally by the Yankees.

The Yankees and Indians/Guardians would meet again in the postseason six more times - in the ALCS in 1998 (won by the Yankees), the ALDS in 2007 (won by the Indians) and 2017 (won by the Yankees), the Wild Card round in 2020 (won by the Yankees), the ALDS again in 2022 (won by the Yankees), and the ALCS again in 2024 (won by the Yankees).

== National League Division Series ==
=== San Francisco Giants vs. Florida Marlins ===
Florida won the series, 3–0.

Game	Date	Score	Location	Time	Attendance
1	September 30	San Francisco Giants – 1, Florida Marlins – 2	Pro Player Stadium	2:48	42,167
2	October 1	San Francisco Giants – 6, Florida Marlins – 7	Pro Player Stadium	3:12	41,283
3	October 3	Florida Marlins – 6, San Francisco Giants – 2	3Com Park at Candlestick Point	3:22	57,188

This was the first postseason meeting between the Marlins and Giants. The Marlins swept the Giants to advance to the NLCS for the first time in franchise history.

Édgar Rentería won the Marlins their first postseason game in Game 1 with a walk-off RBI single. Game 2 was a back-and-forth shootout between both teams, which was won by the Marlins on yet another walk-off RBI single from Moisés Alou. Game 3 was a pitchers’ duel between Florida’s Alex Fernandez and San Francisco’s Wilson Álvarez, which would be won by the former as the Marlins won 6–2 to complete the sweep. Game 3 was the last postseason game ever played at Candlestick Park.

Both teams would meet again in the NLDS in 2003, which was also won by the Marlins en route to a World Series title.

=== Houston Astros vs. Atlanta Braves ===
Atlanta won the series, 3–0.

Game	Date	Score	Location	Time	Attendance
1	September 30	Houston Astros – 1, Atlanta Braves – 2	Turner Field	2:15	46,467
2	October 1	Houston Astros – 3, Atlanta Braves – 13	Turner Field	3:06	49,200
3	October 3	Atlanta Braves – 4, Houston Astros – 1	Astrodome	2:35	53,688

This was the first postseason meeting between the Braves and Astros. The Braves swept the Astros to return to the NLCS for the sixth year in a row.

This series was dominated by Atlanta, as the Astros were only held to five runs scored across the entire series. Greg Maddux pitched a complete game in Game 1 as he outdueled Houston’s Darryl Kile in a 2-1 Braves victory. Tom Glavine pitched six solid innings in Game 2 as the Braves blew out the Astros to take a 2–0 series lead headed to the Astrodome. John Smoltz pitched yet another complete game for the Braves as they won 4–1 in Game 3 to complete the sweep.

The Braves and Astros would meet in the NLDS four more times - in 1999, 2001 (Braves won both), 2004, and 2005 (both won by the Astros). They would also meet in the 2021 World Series, which the Braves won in six games.

== American League Championship Series ==
=== Baltimore Orioles vs. Cleveland Indians ===
Cleveland won the series, 4–2.

Game	Date	Score	Location	Time	Attendance
1	October 8	Cleveland Indians – 0, Baltimore Orioles – 3	Oriole Park at Camden Yards	2:33	49,029
2	October 9	Cleveland Indians – 5, Baltimore Orioles – 4	Oriole Park at Camden Yards	3:53	49,131
3	October 11	Baltimore Orioles – 1, Cleveland Indians – 2 (12)	Jacobs Field	4:51	45,057
4	October 12	Baltimore Orioles – 7, Cleveland Indians – 8	Jacobs Field	3:32	45,081
5	October 13	Baltimore Orioles – 4, Cleveland Indians – 2	Jacobs Field	3:08	45,068
6	October 15	Cleveland Indians – 1, Baltimore Orioles – 0 (11)	Oriole Park at Camden Yards	3:52	49,075

This was the second straight postseason meeting between the Indians and Orioles. They last met in the ALDS the previous year, which the Orioles won in four games. This time, the Indians returned the favor, defeating the Orioles in six games to return to the World Series for the second time in three years.

Scott Erickson pitched eight innings of shutout ball as the Orioles won 4-0 in Game 1. In Game 2, the Indians came from behind to win thanks to a three-run home run from Marquis Grissom in the top of the eighth. When the series shifted to Cleveland, the Indians prevailed in a long and grueling Game 3 thanks to a bunt by Omar Vizquel that scored Grissom in the bottom of the twelfth. Game 4 was an offensive slugfest that was won by the Indians as they took a 3-1 series lead. Scott Kamieniecki pitches six solid innings as the Orioles took Game 5 to send the series back to Baltimore. Game 6 remained scoreless after ten innings of play until Cleveland's Tony Fernández hit a solo home run to put the Indians in the lead for good, effectively securing the pennant. Game 6 would ultimately be Cal Ripken Jr.’s final postseason game.

The Indians would return to the ALCS the next year, but lost to the eventual World Series champion New York Yankees in six games. They would win their next and most recent pennant in 2016 over the Toronto Blue Jays in five games before falling in the World Series.

The Orioles would return to the ALCS in 2014, but were swept by the Kansas City Royals.

== National League Championship Series ==
=== Atlanta Braves vs. Florida Marlins ===
Florida won the series, 4–2.

Game	Date	Score	Location	Time	Attendance
1	October 7	Florida Marlins – 5, Atlanta Braves – 3	Turner Field	3:04	49,244
2	October 8	Florida Marlins – 1, Atlanta Braves – 7	Turner Field	2:51	48,933
3	October 10	Atlanta Braves – 2, Florida Marlins – 5	Pro Player Stadium	2:59	53,857
4	October 11	Atlanta Braves – 4, Florida Marlins – 0	Pro Player Stadium	2:48	54,890
5	October 12	Atlanta Braves – 1, Florida Marlins – 2	Pro Player Stadium	2:27	51,982
6	October 14	Florida Marlins – 7, Atlanta Braves – 4	Turner Field	3:10	50,446

This was the first postseason meeting between the Braves and Marlins. The Marlins defeated the two-time defending National League champion Braves in six games to advance to their first World Series in franchise history, becoming the first team from Florida to accomplish such a feat.

Kevin Brown pitched six solid innings as the Marlins stole Game 1 on the road. In Game 2, Tom Glavine pitched seven innings of shutout ball as the Braves blew out the Marlins to even the series headed to Miami Gardens. In Game 3, Charles Johnson hit a base-clearing RBI as the Marlins came back to win. Denny Neagle pitched a four-hit complete game shutout as the Braves won 4-0 to even the series. Game 5 was marred by controversy as Florida's Liván Hernández was given an unusually wide strike zone by umpire Eric Gregg. Gregg seemed to expand the strike zone as the game went on. It also seemed to be wider off the plate to left-handed hitters than it was to right-handed hitters, and while this was consistently the case with both teams, it disproportionately affected Atlanta due to them having six left-handers in their lineup to Florida's three. It was picked as the third-worst called game from 1975–2000 by Baseball America. Hernández ended up pitching a complete game, striking out 15 batters, allowing only three runs and one hit as the Marlins won 2–1 to go up 3–2 in the series headed back to Atlanta. In Game 6, Brown pitched a complete game despite giving up four runs as the Marlins clinched their first pennant.

The Braves returned to the NLCS the next year, but they lost to the San Diego Padres in six games. They would win the pennant again in 1999 against the New York Mets in six games before coming up short in the World Series.

The 1997 Marlins became the first Wild Card team to win a league pennant. The Marlins would win their next and most recent pennant in 2003 over the Chicago Cubs in seven games en route to another World Series title after trailing 3–1 in the series and being five outs away from elimination in Game 6.

Both teams would meet again in the NLDS in 2020, where the Braves returned the favor and swept the Marlins.

== 1997 World Series ==
=== Cleveland Indians (AL) vs. Florida Marlins (NL) ===
Florida won the series, 4–3.

Game	Date	Score	Location	Time	Attendance
1	October 18	Cleveland Indians – 4, Florida Marlins – 7	Pro Player Stadium	3:19	67,245
2	October 19	Cleveland Indians – 6, Florida Marlins – 1	Pro Player Stadium	2:48	67,025
3	October 21	Florida Marlins – 14, Cleveland Indians – 11	Jacobs Field	4:12	44,880
4	October 22	Florida Marlins – 3, Cleveland Indians – 10	Jacobs Field	3:15	44,887
5	October 23	Florida Marlins – 8, Cleveland Indians – 7	Jacobs Field	3:39	44,888
6	October 25	Cleveland Indians – 4, Florida Marlins – 1	Pro Player Stadium	3:15	67,498
7	October 26	Cleveland Indians – 2, Florida Marlins – 3 (11)	Pro Player Stadium	4:10	67,204

This was the first World Series to ever be played in the state of Florida. In what many consider to be one of the greatest World Series ever played, the Marlins knocked off the Indians in a back-and-forth seven game series to win their first championship in franchise history.

Game 1 was an offensive slugfest which was won by the Marlins. Chad Ogea pitched 6 2/3 solid innings as the Indians took Game 2 to even the series headed to Cleveland. In Game 3, the Marlins prevailed in a high-scoring, back-and-forth slugfest, 14–11, to regain the series lead. Game 3 was the highest scoring game since Game 4 of the 1993 World Series, and was the highest scoring game in a World Series until 2017. In a cold and snowy Game 4, Jaret Wright pitched six solid innings as the Indians blew out the Marlins to even the series at two. Game 4's official gametime temperature of 35 °F (3.3 °C) still stands as the coldest in World Series history, with media outlets reporting wind chill readings as low as 18 °F (−7.8 °C). Game 5 was another slugfest which was won by the Marlins to go up 3–2 in the series headed back to Miami Gardens. The Indians would win Game 6 by a 4–1 score to force a seventh game as Ogea and the Indians bullpen shut down the Marlins offense. In Cleveland’s first-ever Game 7, the Indians held a 2–1 lead in the bottom of the ninth and were two outs away from winning the World Series, but closer José Mesa was unable to hold the lead, giving up a sacrifice fly to Craig Counsell that tied the game. The game went scoreless throughout the tenth, and then in the bottom of the eleventh, an error by Tony Fernández would get Counsell in scoring position. Then, a hard line drive by Edgar Rentería went off Charles Nagy’s glove and rolled into center field, scoring Counsell and winning the series for the Marlins.

The Marlins' World Series title was the first championship won by a Miami-based team since 1974, when the NFL’s Miami Dolphins won Super Bowl VIII. At the time, the Marlins became the quickest expansion team and the first ever wild card-quailfied team to reach (and win) the World Series, as they won it in their fifth season in existence. The Arizona Diamondbacks then became the quickest to reach and win the World Series, as they did it in their fourth year in 2001. The Marlins would win their next and most recent title in 2003 over the New York Yankees in six games.

The Indians would not return to the World Series again until 2016, where they blew a 3–1 series lead to the Chicago Cubs, who won their first title in 108 years.

== Broadcasting ==
This was the second season under a five-year U.S. rights agreement with ESPN, Fox, and NBC. Division Series games aired across the three networks. Fox then televised the American League Championship Series, while NBC aired both the National League Championship Series and the World Series.
