= Manny Hernández =

Dominican baseball player (born 1961)

Manny Hernandez
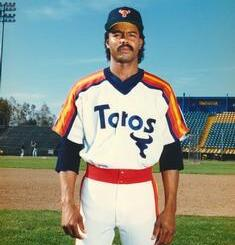
- Hernández with the Tucson Toros c. 1987
- Pitcher
- Born: May 7, 1961 (age 64); La Romana, Dominican Republic
- Batted: Right Threw: Right

MLB debut
- June 5, 1986, for the Houston Astros

Last MLB appearance
- September 16, 1989, for the New York Mets

MLB statistics
- Win–loss record: 2–7
- Earned run average: 4.47
- Strikeouts: 22

CPBL statistics
- Win–loss record: 10–12
- Earned run average: 4.13
- Strikeouts: 109
- Stats at Baseball Reference

Teams
- Houston Astros (1986–1987); New York Mets (1989); Brother Elephants (1995–1996)

Manuel Antonio Hernández Montas (born May 7, 1961) is a Dominican former professional baseball pitcher. He played parts of three seasons in Major League Baseball (MLB) for the Houston Astros (1986–87) and New York Mets (1989).

== Major league career ==
Hernandez made his major league debut on June 6, 1986 at the age of 25 for the Houston Astros. In his first big league season, he went 2–3 with a 3.90 ERA in nine games (four starts), striking out nine batters in 27.2 innings, while walking 12. He also allowed 33 hits.

In 1987, Hernandez pitched in six games for the Astros and went 0–4 with a 5.40 ERA. In 21.2 innings, he struck out 12 batters, walked five and allowed 25 hits. In total, he went 2–7 with a 4.56 ERA in 15 games (seven starts) for the Houston Astros. He pitched in the Astros' organization until 1988, when he was granted free agency.

He was signed by the Minnesota Twins on November 23, 1988 and pitched in their organization until he was purchased by the Mets on August 1, 1989. He appeared in one game for the Mets that year, tossing a perfect inning of relief while striking out one batter. That game, pitched on September 16, would be the final match of his major league career.

Overall, Hernandez went 2–7 with a 4.47 ERA in 16 games (seven starts). He pitched 50.1 innings, striking out 22 batters, walking 17 and allowing 58 hits.

== Minor league career ==
Hernandez's minor league career stretched from 1979 to 1991. He pitched in the Astros organization from 1979 to 1988, the Twins organization in 1989, the Mets organization from 1989 to 1991 and the Milwaukee Brewers organization in 1991. Overall, he went 83–68 with a 3.93 ERA in 240 games (205 starts). He showed flashes of excellence, such as in 1983, when he went 10–3 with a 2.99 ERA for the Daytona Beach Astros.
