= Julio Solano =

Dominican baseball player (born 1960)

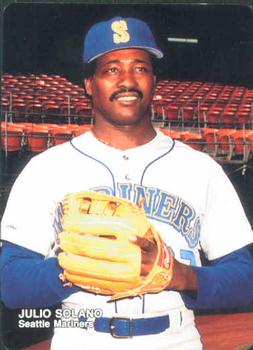
- Solano with the Seattle Mariners c. 1988
- Pitcher
- Born: January 8, 1960 (age 66); Agua Blanca, El Seibo, Dominican Republic
- Batted: Right Threw: Right

MLB debut
- April 5, 1983, for the Houston Astros

Last MLB appearance
- April 30, 1989, for the Seattle Mariners

MLB statistics
- Win–loss record: 6–8
- Earned run average: 4.55
- Strikeouts: 102

CPBL statistics
- Win–loss record: 17–17
- Earned run average: 2.70
- Strikeouts: 210
- Saves: 43
- Stats at Baseball Reference

Teams
- Houston Astros (1983–1987); Seattle Mariners (1988–1989); Mercuries Tigers (1992); Wei Chuan Dragons (1995); Sinon Bulls (1998–1999)

Julio Cesar Solano (born January 8, 1960) is a Dominican former professional baseball player who pitched in Major League Baseball from 1983 to 1989 and in the Chinese Professional Baseball League between 1992 and 1999.

Solano signed with the Houston Astros as an undrafted free agent in November 1979. With the Asheville Tourists in 1982, he tied for the South Atlantic League lead with 3 shutouts and was second with 163 strikeouts. He made his MLB debut with Houston in 1983, going 0–2 with a 6.00 ERA in four relief appearances. He split the next three seasons between Houston in the minors, with a 6–6 record and 4.49 ERA in 78 games.

Houston traded Solano to the Seattle Mariners for pitcher Doug Givler on September 30, 1987. Solano pitched in parts of two seasons for the Mariners, with no record and a 4.55 ERA. He became a free agent after the 1989 season, never pitching in the majors again.

Solano pitched in the Chinese Professional Baseball League for the Mercuries Tigers in 1992, Wei Chuan Dragons in 1995, and Sinon Bulls in 1998 and 1999. He also pitched for the Acereros de Monclova in the Mexican League in 1991, 1993, 1994, and 1996, Petroleros de Poza Rica in 1996, and Guerreros de Oaxaca in 1997.
