= Denny Walling =

American baseball player (born 1954)

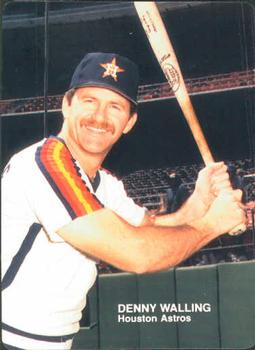
- Third baseman / Outfielder / First baseman
- Born: April 17, 1954 (age 72); Neptune Township, New Jersey, U.S.
- Batted: Left Threw: Right

MLB debut
- September 7, 1975, for the Oakland Athletics

Last MLB appearance
- April 10, 1992, for the Houston Astros

MLB statistics
- Batting average: .271
- Home runs: 49
- Runs batted in: 380
- Stats at Baseball Reference

Teams
- As player: Oakland Athletics (1975–1976); Houston Astros (1977–1988); St. Louis Cardinals (1988–1990); Texas Rangers (1991); Houston Astros (1992); As coach: Oakland Athletics (1996–1998); New York Mets (2002–2004)

Dennis Martin Walling (born April 17, 1954) is an American former Major League Baseball player. Walling played all or parts of 18 seasons in the majors, from 1975 to 1992. His most frequent position was third base, but he also saw significant time as an outfielder and first baseman.

Walling may be best known as a pinch-hitting specialist for the Houston Astros. Nicknamed "Good Wood", Walling was a valuable bat off the bench for most of his career. Entering the 2009 season, his 108 career pinch hits are tied for 13th all-time. He hit .271 with 799 hits in 2,945 lifetime at bats with 49 home runs and 380 RBI in 1,271 games. Walling served as the hitting coach for the Norfolk Tides, the Triple-A affiliate of the Baltimore Orioles before Butch Davis

== Amateur career ==
Walling grew up in Farmingdale, New Jersey, and played baseball at Howell High School in New Jersey.

Walling played college baseball at Clemson University. He was drafted by the St. Louis Cardinals in the 8th round of the 1974 Major League Baseball draft, but he chose to remain at Clemson. He was then drafted in the secondary phase of the 1975 draft by the Oakland Athletics.

== Professional playing career ==
=== Oakland ===
Walling began his professional career as an outfielder. Three months after being drafted by the A's, and before he appeared in a game in the minor leagues, Walling made his major league debut on September 7, 1975. He appeared in six games for Oakland down the stretch, getting one hit in eight at bats for a batting average of .125.

Walling opened the next season in the minors with the Chattanooga Lookouts, the A's Class-AA affiliate. After batting .257 in 115 games for Chattanooga, Walling was again in Oakland in September. This time, he played just three games, going 3-for-11 for a .273 average.

In 1977, Walling was back in the minors to start the year, but played just three games for the Class-AAA San Jose Missions in the first two months due to injuries. On June 15, Walling was traded to the Houston Astros for outfielder Willie Crawford, who was playing his last season in the majors after a long career.

=== Houston ===
After being traded to the Astros, Walling was assigned to Class-AAA Charleston Charlies. He played 29 games for Charleston and batted .348. It would be the last time Walling played in the minor leagues for over a decade. He was once again promoted to the majors in September, this time playing in six games, going 6-for-21 (.286 average) with 6 RBI.

In 1978, Walling was the closest thing the Astros had to a regular left fielder, playing 49 games there, more than anyone else on the team. However, even then, he made more appearances as a pinch hitter than in the field, as he played only 55 of his 120 games as an outfielder. The Astrodome was a notoriously difficult place to be a batter, but Walling managed to be about an average major league hitter, posting an OPS+ of exactly 100. Overall, Walling batted .251 for the Astros, with 36 RBI.

Over the next ten seasons, Walling played much the same role on the Astros, generally playing only against right-handed pitchers. For his career, Walling batted seven times as often against righties as against left-handed pitchers, prompted perhaps by his significantly lower batting average (.276 vs. righties, .236 vs. lefties) and slugging percentage (.399, .330). Statistically, his best year was 1986, when he set career highs in several categories, most notably in home runs (13) and RBI (58) while batting .312 in 130 games.

During this time, he shifted all over the field, playing good chunks of time at first base in 1980, 1981 and 1983, while playing mostly third base from 1984 until 1988, when he was traded to the St. Louis Cardinals on August 31 for pitcher Bob Forsch.

In Game 3 of the 1980 National League Championship Series, Walling hit a ball that was caught by the left fielder in a tie game of the 9th inning that gave the runner at third base (Joe Morgan had hit a triple before being replaced by a pinch runner) enough room to score to win the game. It was the first walk-off postseason hit in Astros history. In Game 2 of the 1981 National League Division Series, Walling hit a walk-off single against the Dodgers, which was just the second walk-off postseason hit for the Astros in their history. It would be their last walk-off win until 1998.

=== Cardinals ===
Walling played two and a half seasons in St. Louis, mostly as a pinch hitter. While he batted .304 in 1989 in 79 at bats, he batted just .220 in 1990, and was allowed to become a free agent at the end of the season.

=== End of career ===
Going into 1991, Walling signed with the Texas Rangers. However, he went just 4-for-44 in 27 games, for a batting average of just .091. He had just one double and three singles among his hits, and had just 2 RBI. He was released by the Rangers in June, and did not play professionally for the rest of the season. In 1992, Walling briefly attempted a comeback with his longtime team, the Houston Astros. However, he batted just three times with one hit before retiring.

== Coaching career ==
After his playing career ended, Walling remained in baseball as a coach. In the major leagues, he has served as the hitting coach for the Athletics from 1996 until 1998, and for the New York Mets from 2002 until 2004. In both positions, he served under manager Art Howe, who was his teammate in Houston. In 2007, he was hired by the Orioles as their roving minor league instructor and later became the hitting coach for the Norfolk Tides.

== See also ==
- List of baseball players who went directly to Major League Baseball
