= Mike Madden (baseball) =

American baseball player (born 1958)

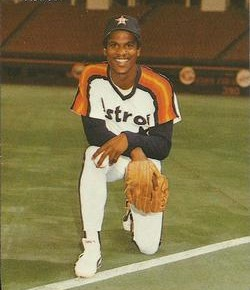
- Pitcher
- Born: January 13, 1958 (age 67); Denver, Colorado, U.S.
- Batted: Left Threw: Left

MLB debut
- April 5, 1983, for the Houston Astros

Last MLB appearance
- June 11, 1986, for the Houston Astros

MLB statistics
- Win–loss record: 12–10
- Earned run average: 3.94
- Strikeouts: 119
- Stats at Baseball Reference

Teams
- Houston Astros (1983–1986)

Michael Anthony Madden (born January 13, 1958) is an American former professional baseball player who pitched in Major League Baseball (MLB) from 1983 to 1986 for the Houston Astros. Madden played college ball at University of Northern Colorado.

In 71 games and 26 starts, Madden compiled a 12–10 record, with 119 strikeouts and a 3.94 ERA.
