= Frank DiPino =

American baseball player (born 1956)

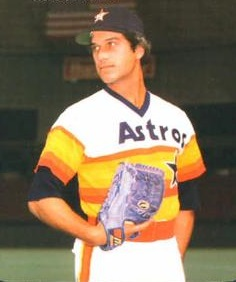
- Pitcher
- Born: October 22, 1956 (age 68) Syracuse, New York, U.S.
- Batted: Left Threw: Left

MLB debut
- September 13, 1981, for the Milwaukee Brewers

Last MLB appearance
- July 22, 1993, for the Kansas City Royals

MLB statistics
- Win–loss record: 35–38
- Earned run average: 3.83
- Strikeouts: 515
- Saves: 56
- Stats at Baseball Reference

Teams
- Milwaukee Brewers (1981); Houston Astros (1982–1986); Chicago Cubs (1986–1988); St. Louis Cardinals (1989–1992); Kansas City Royals (1993)

Frank Michael DiPino (born October 22, 1956) is an American former professional baseball pitcher who played for the Milwaukee Brewers, Houston Astros, Chicago Cubs, St. Louis Cardinals, and Kansas City Royals of Major League Baseball (MLB).

DiPino attended West Genesee High School where, as a junior, he chose to work a job instead of playing varsity baseball. He joined the team as a senior but the team's season was only 15 games long. He played college baseball briefly for the Saint Leo Lions in St. Leo, Florida before returning to Central New York where he played summer ball. In July 1977, DiPino attended a tryout camp with the Milwaukee Brewers, faced four batters, allowed only two foul balls and was offered a contract with the Brewers' minor league club in Newark, New York.

On September 7, 1982, DiPino struck out ten batters in five innings for his first Major League victory. On July 21, 1986, the Astros traded DiPino to the Cubs for Davey Lopes.

DiPino was the winning pitcher for the Cubs in the first official night game played at Wrigley Field, on August 9, 1988.

DiPino has the best batting average against for any pitcher who faced Tony Gwynn more than ten times. Gwynn, a lifetime .338 hitter, was .050, going 1 for 20 with three walks.

As of 2013, DiPino was a pitching instructor for Perfect Practice of Syracuse, New York.
