= Jeff Calhoun (baseball) =

American baseball player (born 1958)

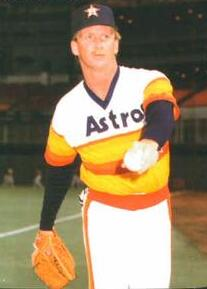
- Calhoun with the Houston Astros c. 1985
- Pitcher
- Born: April 11, 1958 (age 68); LaGrange, Georgia, U.S.
- Batted: Left Threw: Left

MLB debut
- September 2, 1984, for the Houston Astros

Last MLB appearance
- April 14, 1988, for the Philadelphia Phillies

MLB statistics
- Win–loss record: 6–7
- Earned run average: 2.51
- Strikeouts: 104
- Stats at Baseball Reference

Teams
- Houston Astros (1984–1986); Philadelphia Phillies (1987–1988)

Jeffrey Wilton Calhoun (born April 11, 1958) is an American former professional baseball middle relief pitcher who played from 1984 through 1988 in Major League Baseball (MLB) for the Houston Astros and Philadelphia Phillies. Listed at 6' 2", 190 lb., he batted and threw left-handed.

Born in LaGrange, Georgia, Calhoun attended University of Mississippi in Oxford, MS, where he pitched for the Ole Miss Rebels. He was selected by the Astros in the third round of the 1980 MLB draft.

In Game 6 of the 1986 NLCS, against the New York Mets, Calhoun unleashed two wild pitches, a walk and an RBI-single, as the Astros lost 7–6 in 16 innings, in what was the longest postseason baseball game ever played at the time.

In 1987, Calhoun was sent by Houston to the Phillies in exchange for catcher Ronn Reynolds.

== After baseball ==
Calhoun is now on the ministry staff of the Second Baptist Church in Houston, Texas, and also is a pitching coach for the school's high school baseball team.

Calhoun's daughter, Amber, plays volleyball for Texas State University. His son, Jay, is currently a pilot for Delta Connection carrier Endeavor Air.
