= 1990 Houston Astros season =

1990 Houston Astros
- League: National League
- Division: West
- Ballpark: The Astrodome
- City: Houston, Texas
- Record: 75–87 (.463)
- Divisional place: 4th—tied
- Owners: John McMullen
- General managers: Bill Wood
- Managers: Art Howe
- Television: KTXH; HSE
- Radio: KTRH (Bill Brown, Milo Hamilton, Larry Dierker, Bruce Gietzen, Bill Worrell); KXYZ (Orlando Sánchez-Diago, Rolando Becerra)

The 1990 Houston Astros season was the 29th season for the Major League Baseball (MLB) franchise located in Houston, Texas, their 26th as the Astros, 29th in the National League (NL), 22nd in the NL West division, and 26th at The Astrodome. The Astros entered the season having posted a record of 86–76 for third place in the NL West, six games behind the division-champion and NL pennant-winning San Francisco Giants.

On April 9, pitcher Mike Scott made his fourth Opening Day start for Houston, who hosted the Cincinnati Reds, but were defeated, 8–4. In the amateur draft, the Astros' first round selections included shortstop Tom Nevers (21st overall) and pitcher Brian Williams (31st).

Pitcher Dave Smith earned his second career MLB All-Star selection, representing the Astros and playing for the National League. Second baseman Joe Morgan was inducted into the Baseball Hall of Fame, at the time the longest-tenured former, and earliest, member of the Colt .45s/Astro to receive this honor. He started his major league career with Houston in 1963 and played 10 of his 22 major league seasons for the franchise. Pitcher Danny Darwin, who worked primarily out of the bullpen, was the NL earned run average (ERA) leader (2.21), the third ERA title by an Astros pitcher within the previous five seasons.

The Astros concluded the season with a 75–87 record, tied for fourth place with the San Diego Padres and 16 games behind the division- and World Series-champion Reds. The 87 losses were the most for Houston since 1978.

== Offseason ==
- December 6, 1989: Bill Gullickson was signed as a free agent by the Astros.
- December 19, 1989: Dan Schatzeder was signed as a free agent by the Astros.
- March 13, 1990: Dave Silvestri and a player to be named later were traded by the Astros to the New York Yankees for Orlando Miller. The Astros completed the deal by sending Daven Bond (minors) to the Yankees on June 11.

== Regular season ==
=== Summary ===
==== April ====
Opening Day starting lineup
Uniform	Player	Position
2	Gerald Young	Center fielder
7	Craig Biggio	Catcher
19	Bill Doran	Second baseman
27	Glenn Davis	First baseman
13	Glenn Wilson	Right fielder
23	Eric Anthony	Left fielder
11	Ken Caminiti	Third baseman
16	Rafael Ramírez	Shortstop
33	Mike Scott	Pitcher
Venue: Astrodome • Final: Cincinnati 8, Houston 4 Sources:

Hosting the Cincinnati Reds for Opening Day on April 9—also the event for the 25th anniversary since the opening of the Astrodome—the Astros built a 4–2 lead in the bottom of the second inning. However, Cincinnati came back to drop the Astros, 8–4. The most pain went to first baseman Glenn Davis, who was hit by pitch three times, which tied a major-league record. Right-hander Mike Scott made his fourth Opening Day start, joining Larry Dierker and J. R. Richard (five) to have done so as the starting pitcher. Shortstop Rafael Ramírez attained his fourth bout of four hits as a member of the Astros.

==== May ====
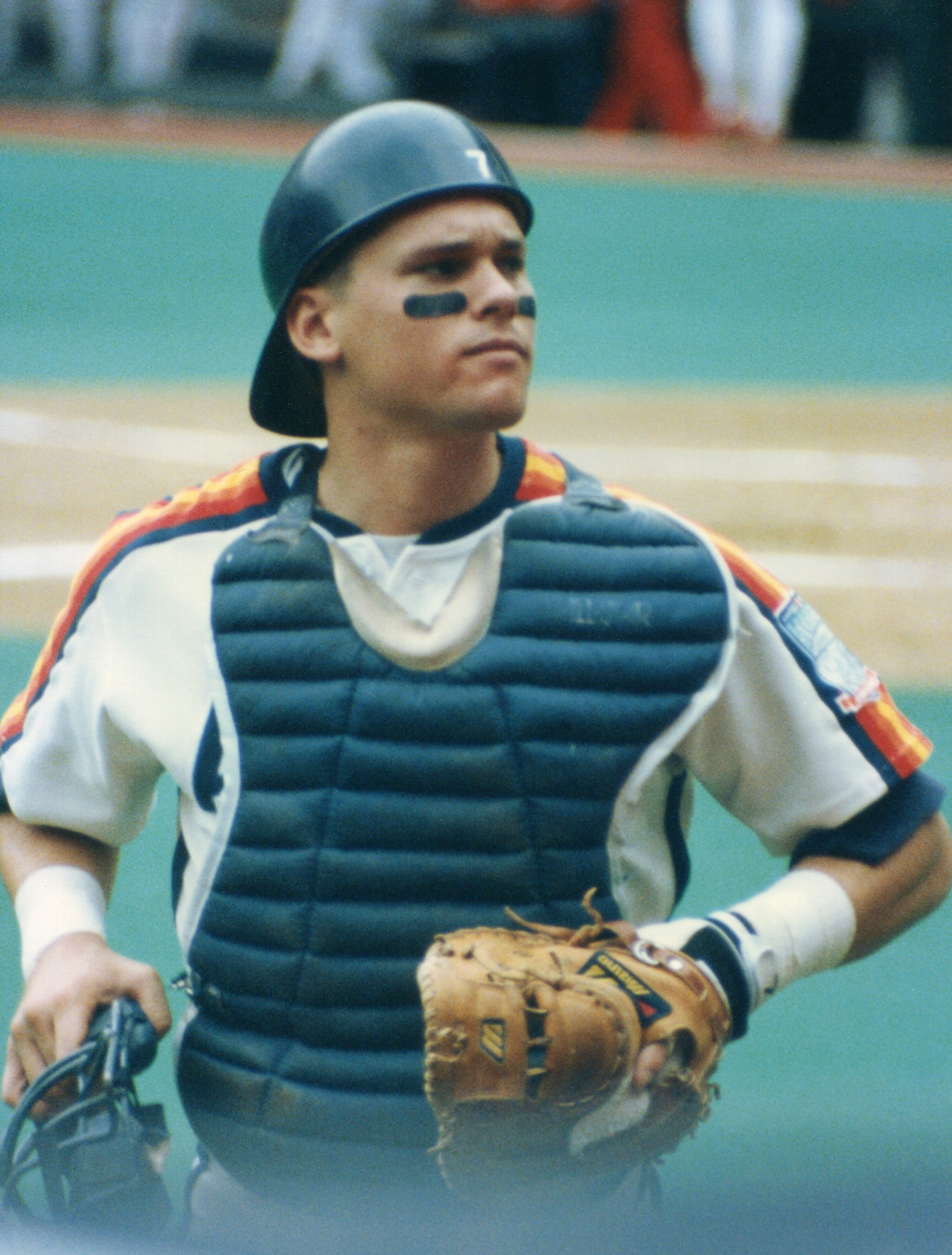
Craig Biggio at catcher in late in the 1990 season.

On May 17, Houston outfielder Eric Anthony launched the first-ever home run by a member of the home team into the upper reserve seating at the Astrodome, a monster blast in the eighth inning during a 5–4 win over the Chicago Cubs. Ken Oberkfell cranked a sacrifice fly in the eleventh inning to score Ken Caminiti for the game-winning run. Anthony's drive came off Mike Bielecki. The only previous home run that had landed in the first upper deck was launched by Bernie Carbo of the Reds in 1970.

On May 26, the Cubs hosted the Astros at Wrigley Field for their first doubleheader since July 7, 1979. The Astros swept, led by Glenn Davis homering thrice over the two games to tie a club record for a doubleheader, set by Román Mejías, on May 6, 1962, against the Milwaukee Braves. Davis was 6-for-9 with 9 runs batted in (RBI). In the opener, Mike Scott (2–5) tossed his first complete game of the season. Jim Deshaies (2–2) started the second contest and allowed six hits over 5 2/3 innings to earn the win, while Larry Andersen closed out the final 3 1/3 innings for his second save.

==== June ====
Astros slugger Glenn Davis connected for three home runs and five runs batted in (RBI) in one game on June 1. That was nearly enough offense for Houston, who managed just two additional hits, though they worked six walks. Davis homered in each of the fourth, sixth, and eighth innings. San Francisco scored thrice in the bottom of the seventh to tie the game, 4–4. Davis' final shot gave the Astros the lead, 5–4; however, in the bottom of the eighth, Will Clark singled home Brett Butler to tie the score. In the bottom of the 12th, Greg Litton . It was the second time that he had hit three home runs in a game during his career, and the fourth time overall by a Houston Astro. (Note: Davis became the first Houston Astro with multiple-3 homer games, having blasted the previous by an Astros hitter on September 10, 1987, and this achievement was followed by Jeff Bagwell on June 24, 1994.)

==== Mike Scott's 15-strikeout game ====
Mike Scott tossed both a career-best 10-inning complete game and 15 strikeouts on June 8, a three-hitter which was his 12th complete game of three hits or fewer. After exchanging shutout ball with Tom Browning for nine innings, the Cincinnati Reds broke through in the top of the 10th inning on an RBI single. by Todd Benzinger to score Barry Larkin. During the bottom of the tenth, Ken Caminiti whiffed against Randy Myers before Eric Anthony drew a base on balls, who was replaced by Louie Meadows. Rafael Ramírez singled on ground ball to left. One out later, Glenn Wilson smoked a walk-off home run to right field for a 3–1 Houston win. Scott's (3–6) effort earned a game score of 96.

In the bottom of the first, Scott struck out the side, all swinging, He followed that up by registering a pair of whiffs in each of the next two frames. Scott retired each hitter during the initial rotation through the order while peppering 26 of the first 30 offerings for strikes. This performance eclipsed the previous career high of 14 attained three times (twice in 1986, September 14, and Game 1 of the National League Championship Series, and June 15, 1987). Scott's 15-strikeout contest was the highest single-game total by an Astros moundsman since Nolan Ryan fanned 16 on September 9, 1987, and the ninth time in club history in which an individual pitcher tallied 15 or more strikeouts. (Note: The next bout of 15 or more strikeouts was delivered by Randy Johnson on August 28, 1998. Criteria: For single games, playing for HOU, in the regular season, requiring strikeouts ≥ 15, sorted by ascending date.)

==== July ====
After having been inserted into the starting rotation beginning in July, Danny Darwin responded with a 4–0 win–loss record (W–L), 1.04 earned run average (ERA), two home runs surrendered, 28 strikeouts, and 0.808 walks plus hits per inning pitched (WHIP) over 43 1/3 innings pitched. Hence, Darwin received the NL Pitcher of the Month award, succeeding Mike Scott as the most recent Astro, who had received the award in June of the previous year.

==== August ====
On August 3, Mike Scott hurled his seventh career shutout of three hits or fewer, leading a 3–0 victory over Atlanta. Ken Oberkfell tripled and drove in two runs, and Bill Doran also tripled, tallied three hits, and scored twice. Scott (9–10) surrendered just two walks, fanned six, and earned a game score of 85. This would also be Scott's final major league victory, though he did start once more for Houston on Opening Day of the following season.

==== September ====
On September 21, Houston turned the sixth triple play in club history, doing so in the bottom of the fourth inning against the Atlanta Braves. During the bottom of the fourth, David Justice and Jim Presley opened with consecutive singles off Jim Deshaies. Francisco Cabrera hit a grounder to Ken Caminiti, who made the forceout at third, rifled to Dave Rohde at second, who relayed to Mike Simms at first to complete the play. During the top of the sixth, Eric Anthony slugged a three-run home run. The Braves came back to tie the game, 3–3, during the bottom of the ninth. However, Simms slugged the game-winning home run for Houston in the top of the tenth.

On September 28, Casey Candaele stunned Atlanta with the fourth walk-off triple in club history, (Note: The most recent walk-off triple was by César Cedeño on July 29, 1979. The subsequent event was prosecuted by Luke Scott on September 11, 2007.) to plate Mark Davidson and Eric Yelding in the bottom of the tenth inning. The final score was Houston 2, Atlanta 1. Starter Danny Darwin spun seven shutout frames to lower his earned run average (ERA) to 2.21, by which claiming the NL ERA title.

==== Performance overview ====
The Astros concluded the season with a 75–87 record, tied for fourth place with the San Diego Padres, and 16 games behind the division- and World Series-champion Reds. A decline by 11 wins from the year prior, the 87 losses were the most for Houston since 1978.

The Astros played in 27 extra-inning games, tying a league record. Six of the contests were claimed by the Astros via pinch-hit, walk-off hits, establishing an all-time franchise record, three of which occurred during extra innings. Glenn Wilson led the way with three of the pinch-hit walk-offs (one in extra innings). Previously, the Colt .45s/Astros had authored as many as three pinch-hit walk-off events each in 1962, 1969, 1979, and 1987.

Danny Darwin led the National League in earned run average (2.21 ERA), to become the third Houston Astro within the previous five years to attain the ERA title, following Scott in 1986 (2.22) and Nolan Ryan in 1987 (2.76). This was the fifth ERA title overall in franchise history. Darwin, who made 31 of 48 total appearances out of the bullpen, also led the major leagues in walks plus hits per inning pitched (1.027 WHIP).

Glenn Davis became the first Astro in franchise history to swat 20 or more home runs over six consecutive campaigns. Both Jeff Bagwell (1999) and Lance Berkman (2007) eventually matched, and surpassed, this milestone. Davis was recognized with the Lou Gehrig Memorial Award following the season, also an Astros first.

Left fielder Franklin Stubbs set a club record for home runs by a left-handed batter, with 23.

Eric Yelding established a club rookie record for stolen bases with 64, breaking the record of 49 set by Sonny Jackson in 1966.

=== League standings ===
==== National League West ====
NL West
Team	W	L	Pct.	GB	Home	Road
Cincinnati Reds	91	71	.562	—	46‍–‍35	45‍–‍36
Los Angeles Dodgers	86	76	.531	5	47‍–‍34	39‍–‍42
San Francisco Giants	85	77	.525	6	49‍–‍32	36‍–‍45
Houston Astros	75	87	.463	16	49‍–‍32	26‍–‍55
San Diego Padres	75	87	.463	16	37‍–‍44	38‍–‍43
Atlanta Braves	65	97	.401	26	37‍–‍44	28‍–‍53

==== Record versus opponents ====
National League

1990 National League record Sources:
Team	ATL	CHC	CIN	HOU	LAD	MON	NYM	PHI	PIT	SD	SF	STL
Atlanta	—	6–6	8–10	5–13	6–12	6–6	4–8	5–7	5–7	8–10	5–13	7–5
Chicago	6–6	—	4–8	6–6	3–9	11–7	9–9	11–7	4–14	8–4	7–5	8–10
Cincinnati	10–8	8–4	—	11–7	9–9	9–3	6–6	7–5	6–6	9–9	7–11	9–3
Houston	13–5	6–6	7–11	—	9–9	5–7	5–7	5–7	5–7	4–14	10–8	6–6
Los Angeles	12–6	9–3	9–9	9–9	—	6–6	5–7	8–4	4–8	9–9	8–10	7–5
Montreal	6–6	7–11	3–9	7–5	6–6	—	8–10	10–8	13–5	7–5	7–5	11–7
New York	8–4	9–9	6–6	7–5	7–5	10–8	—	10–8	10–8	5–7	7–5	12–6
Philadelphia	7-5	7–11	5–7	7–5	4–8	8–10	8–10	—	6–12	7–5	8–4	10–8
Pittsburgh	7–5	14–4	6–6	7–5	8–4	5–13	8–10	12–6	—	10–2	8–4	10–8
San Diego	10–8	4–8	9–9	14–4	9–9	5–7	7–5	5–7	2–10	—	7–11	3–9
San Francisco	13–5	5–7	11–7	8–10	10–8	5–7	5–7	4–8	4–8	11–7	—	9–3
St. Louis	5–7	10–8	3–9	6–6	5–7	7–11	6–12	8–10	8–10	9–3	3–9	—

=== Notable transactions ===
- April 3, 1990: Roger Mason was released by the Houston Astros.
- August 21, 1990: Signed outfielder Bobby Abreu as amateur free agent.
- August 30, 1990: Pitcher Larry Andersen was traded by the Astros to the Boston Red Sox for third baseman Jeff Bagwell.
- August 30, 1990: Bill Doran was traded by the Houston Astros to the Cincinnati Reds for players to be named later.
- September 10, 1990: Dan Schatzeder was traded by the Astros to the New York Mets for Nick Davis (minors) and Steve LaRose (minors).
- September 7, 1990: Butch Henry was sent by the Cincinnati Reds to the Houston Astros to complete an earlier deal made on August 30, 1990. Catcher Terry McGriff was also sent by the Cincinnati Reds to complete the deal.

=== Roster ===
1990 Houston Astros
Roster
Pitchers: 49 Juan Agosto; 47 Larry Andersen; 38 Jim Clancy; 53 Terry Clark; 44 Danny Darwin; 43 Jim Deshaies; 54 Brian Fisher; 36 Bill Gullickson; 54 Randy Hennis; 31 Xavier Hernandez; 37 Charlie Kerfeld; 35 Brian Meyer; 52 Al Osuna; 51 Mark Portugal; 20 Dan Schatzeder; 33 Mike Scott; 45 Dave Smith	Catchers: 7 Craig Biggio; 2 Rich Gedman; 9 Terry McGriff; 28 Carl Nichols; 9 Alex Treviño; Infielders: 11 Ken Caminiti; 17 Andújar Cedeño; 27 Glenn Davis; 19 Bill Doran; 26 Luis Gonzalez; 10 Ken Oberkfell; 16 Rafael Ramírez; 6 Dave Rohde; 30 Mike Simms; 24 Franklin Stubbs	Outfielders: 23 Eric Anthony; 17 Jeff Baldwin; 1 Casey Candaele; 22 Mark Davidson; 26 Louie Meadows; 29 Javier Ortiz; 21 Terry Puhl; 4 Karl Rhodes; 12 Glenn Wilson; 15 Eric Yelding; 13 Gerald Young; Other batters: 4 Steve Lombardozzi	Manager: 18 Art Howe; Coaches: 54 Bob Cluck (pitching); 48 Matt Galante (third base); 3 Phil Garner (assistant); 42 Rudy Jaramillo (hitting); 14 Ed Ott (first base); 5 Ed Napoleon (assistant)

== Game log ==
=== Regular season ===
Legend
	Astros win
	Astros loss
	Postponement
	Eliminated from playoff race
**Bold**	Astros team member

1990 regular season game log: 75–87 (Home: 49–32; Away: 26–55)
April: 9–10 (Home: 5–8; Away: 4–2)

#	Date	Time (CT)	Opponent	Score	Win	Loss	Save	Time of Game	Attendance	Record	Box/ Streak

May: 11–17 (Home: 6–6; Away: 5–11)

#	Date	Time (CT)	Opponent	Score	Win	Loss	Save	Time of Game	Attendance	Record	Box/ Streak

June: 12–16 (Home: 11–3; Away: 1–13)

#	Date	Time (CT)	Opponent	Score	Win	Loss	Save	Time of Game	Attendance	Record	Box/ Streak

July: 11–18 (Home: 7–4; Away: 4–14)

#	Date	Time (CT)	Opponent	Score	Win	Loss	Save	Time of Game	Attendance	Record	Box/ Streak
—	July 10	7:35 p.m. CDT	**61st All-Star Game in Chicago, IL**								

August: 16–11 (Home: 10–6; Away: 6–5)

#	Date	Time (CT)	Opponent	Score	Win	Loss	Save	Time of Game	Attendance	Record	Box/ Streak

September: 15–13 (Home: 10–5; Away: 5–8)

#	Date	Time (CT)	Opponent	Score	Win	Loss	Save	Time of Game	Attendance	Record	Box/ Streak

October: 1–2 (Home: 0–0; Away: 1–2)

#	Date	Time (CT)	Opponent	Score	Win	Loss	Save	Time of Game	Attendance	Record	Box/ Streak

=== Detailed records ===
National League
Opponent	W	L	WP	RS	RA
NL East
Div Total
NL West
**Houston Astros**					
Div Total
Season Total

Month	Games	Won	Lost	Win %	RS	RA
April
May
June
July
August
September
October
Total

	Games	Won	Lost	Win %	RS	RA
Home
Away
Total

== Player stats ==
=== Batting ===
==== Starters by position ====
Note: Pos = Position; G = Games played; AB = At bats; H = Hits; Avg. = Batting average; HR = Home runs; RBI = Runs batted in

Pos	Player	G	AB	H	Avg.	HR	RBI
C	Craig Biggio	150	555	153	.276	4	42
1B	Glenn Davis	93	327	82	.251	22	64
2B	Bill Doran	109	344	99	.288	6	32
3B	Ken Caminiti	153	541	131	.242	4	51
SS	Rafael Ramírez	132	445	116	.261	2	37
LF	Franklin Stubbs	146	448	117	.261	23	71
CF	Eric Yelding	142	511	130	.254	1	20
RF	Glenn Wilson	118	368	90	.245	10	55

==== Other batters ====
Note: G = Games played; AB = At bats; H = Hits; Avg. = Batting average; HR = Home runs; RBI = Runs batted in

Player	G	AB	H	Avg.	HR	RBI
Casey Candaele	130	262	75	.286	3	22
Eric Anthony	84	239	46	.192	10	29
Gerald Young	57	154	27	.175	1	4
Ken Oberkfell	77	150	31	.207	1	12
Mark Davidson	57	130	38	.292	1	11
Rich Gedman	40	104	21	.202	1	10
Dave Rohde	59	98	18	.184	0	5
Tuffy Rhodes	38	86	21	.244	1	3
Javier Ortiz	30	77	21	.273	1	10
Alex Treviño	42	69	13	.188	1	10
Carl Nichols	32	49	10	.204	1	11
Terry Puhl	37	41	12	.293	0	8
Luis Gonzalez	12	21	4	.190	0	0
Louie Meadows	15	14	2	.143	0	0
Mike Simms	12	13	4	.308	1	2
Jeff Baldwin	7	8	0	.000	0	0
Andújar Cedeño	7	8	0	.000	0	0
Terry McGriff	4	5	0	.000	0	0
Steve Lombardozzi	2	1	0	.000	0	0

=== Pitching ===
==== Starting pitchers ====
Note: G = Games pitched; IP = Innings pitched; W = Wins; L = Losses; ERA = Earned run average; SO = Strikeouts

Player	G	IP	W	L	ERA	SO
Jim Deshaies	34	209.1	7	12	3.78	119
Mike Scott	32	205.2	9	13	3.81	121
Mark Portugal	32	196.2	11	10	3.62	136
Bill Gullickson	32	193.1	10	14	3.82	73
Terry Clark	1	4.0	0	0	13.50	2

==== Other pitchers ====
Note: G = Games pitched; IP = Innings pitched; W = Wins; L = Losses; ERA = Earned run average; SO = Strikeouts

Player	G	IP	W	L	ERA	SO
Danny Darwin	48	162.2	11	4	2.21	109
Jim Clancy	33	76.0	2	8	6.51	44
Randy Hennis	3	9.2	0	0	0.00	4

==== Relief pitchers ====
Note: G = Games pitched; W = Wins; L = Losses; SV = Saves; ERA = Earned run average; SO = Strikeouts

Player	G	W	L	SV	ERA	SO
Dave Smith	49	6	6	23	2.39	50
Juan Agosto	82	9	8	4	4.29	50
Larry Andersen	50	5	2	6	1.95	68
Dan Schatzeder	45	1	3	0	2.39	37
Xavier Hernandez	34	2	1	0	4.62	24
Brian Meyer	14	0	4	1	2.21	6
Al Osuna	12	2	0	0	4.76	6
Charlie Kerfeld	5	0	2	0	16.20	4
Brian Fisher	4	0	0	0	7.20	1

== Awards and achievements ==
=== Career honors ===
Colt .45s / Astros elected to Baseball Hall of Fame
Individual	Position	Houston Colt .45s / Astros career					Induction	
Individual	Position	Uni.	Seasons	Games	Start	Finish	Induction	
Joe Morgan	Second baseman	18 (Note: Also wore numbers 12 (1963), 35 (1964), and 8 (1980).)	10 (Note: Played two separate stints for the Colts .45s/Astros, first from 1963 to 1971, and again in 1980.)	1,032	1963	1980	Class	Plaque
See also: Members of the Baseball Hall of Fame • Sources:

=== Annual awards ===
1990 Houston Astros award winners
Name of award		Recipient	Ref.
Fred Hartman Award for Long and Meritorious Service to Baseball		Allen Russell	
Houston-Area Major League Player of the Year	PIT	Doug Drabek	
Houston Astros Most Valuable Player (MVP)		Danny Darwin	
Lou Gehrig Memorial Award		Glenn Davis	
MLB All-Star	Reserve pitcher	Dave Smith	
National League (NL) Pitcher of the Month	July	Danny Darwin	
National League (NL) Player of the Week	April 15	Craig Biggio	
National League (NL) Player of the Week	September 16	Bill Doran	
National League (NL) Player of the Week	September 30	Franklin Stubbs	

=== League leaders ===
==== Batting ====
- Caught stealing: Eric Yelding (25—led MLB)
- Hit by pitch: Glenn Davis (8)

==== Pitching ====
- Bases on balls per nine innings pitched (BB/9): Danny Darwin (1.7—led MLB)
- Earned run average (ERA): Danny Darwin (2.21)
- Games pitched: Juan Agosto (82—led MLB)
- Walks plus hits per inning pitched (WHIP): Danny Darwin (1.027—led MLB)

=== Other ===
1990 grand slams
No.	Date	Astros batter	Venue	Inning	Pitcher	Opposing team	Box
None (Note: The Astros' first season without a grand slam since 1981, and first during a non-shortened season since 1979.)

== Minor league system ==
Level	Team	League	Manager
AAA	Tucson Toros	Pacific Coast League	Bob Skinner
AA	Columbus Mudcats	Southern League	Rick Sweet
A	Osceola Astros	Florida State League	Sal Butera
A	Asheville Tourists	South Atlantic League	Frank Cacciatore
A-Short Season	Auburn Astros	New York–Penn League	Ricky Peters
Rookie	GCL Astros	Gulf Coast League	Julio Linares

== See also ==
- List of Major League Baseball annual ERA leaders
