= Eric Anthony =

American baseball player (born 1967)

- Outfielder
- Born: November 8, 1967 (age 58); San Diego, California, U.S.
- Batted: Left Threw: Left

Professional debut
- MLB: July 28, 1989, for the Houston Astros
- NPB: July 14, 1998, for the Yakult Swallows

Last appearance
- MLB: September 27, 1997, for the Los Angeles Dodgers
- NPB: October 9, 1998, for the Yakult Swallows

MLB statistics
- Batting average: .231
- Home runs: 78
- Runs batted in: 269

NPB statistics
- Batting average: .245
- Home runs: 12
- Runs batted in: 31
- Stats at Baseball Reference

Teams
- Houston Astros (1989–1993); Seattle Mariners (1994); Cincinnati Reds (1995–1996); Colorado Rockies (1996); Los Angeles Dodgers (1997); Yakult Swallows (1998)

Eric Todd Anthony (born November 8, 1967) is an American former professional baseball outfielder who played in Major League Baseball (MLB) for the Houston Astros, Seattle Mariners, Cincinnati Reds, Colorado Rockies and Los Angeles Dodgers. He also played in Nippon Professional Baseball (NPB) for the Yakult Swallows.

Drafted by the Astros in the 34th round of the 1986 MLB amateur draft, Anthony would make his Major League Baseball debut with them on July 28, 1989, and appear in his final game, for the Dodgers, on September 27, 1997.

== High school ==
In 1986, Anthony was an 18-year-old Sharpstown High School dropout working on an assembly line at a Houston plastics company. He talked his way into an Astros tryout in 1986 and impressed scouts with his power, stunning them during batting practice by hitting a series of home runs that landed well beyond 400 feet from home plate. Subsequently, he was drafted by the Astros in the 34th round of the 1986 MLB amateur draft.

== Professional career ==
=== Minor Leagues ===
In the minor leagues, he tore through Single-A and Double-A pitching, building his reputation for prodigious home runs. His feast or famine plate approach had him averaging 30 home runs per season (along with an alarming 120 strikeouts per year). In 1989, Anthony led all minor-leaguers with 31 home runs and was the Southern League Most Valuable Player for the Columbus Mudcats. In desperate need of power-hitters, with only first baseman Glenn Davis hitting more than 13 home runs for the team that season, the Astros took a gamble and called Anthony up to the majors from Double-A in late July 1989.

=== Major Leagues ===
Anthony's first major league hit came in his second game as an Astro. The home run, a 414-foot shot off the San Francisco Giants' Rick Reuschel, easily cleared the Astrodome fences. Later that game, he just missed another home run on an opposite-field shot that caromed off the top of the wall for a double.

The following season, Anthony electrified fans in the Astrodome in a game against the Chicago Cubs by launching a home run into the right field upper deck—the first Astro ever to put a home run there and the first player to do so since 1970. The pitch traveled an estimated 440 feet and the seat where the ball landed was commemorated with a star. For his first three seasons in the big leagues, Anthony shuttled between Triple-A Tucson and Houston, dominating minor-league pitching but never managing to hit over .200 at the MLB level.

Anthony's best season in the majors came in 1992, when he became a starter in the Astros outfield and slugged 19 home runs along with 80 RBIs. He followed that with a 15 HR, 66 RBI performance in 1993, and although he improved his batting average 10 points to .249 that season, he was dealt to the Seattle Mariners in the offseason for young lefthanded pitcher Mike Hampton. This trade has since been considered to be lopsided in favor of the Astros as Anthony would be released by the Mariners by the end of 1994 while Hampton became one of the Astros best pitchers.

On April 4, 1994, Anthony hit the first home run at Cleveland's Jacobs Field.

Anthony played as a reserve outfielder for the Mariners, Reds, Rockies, and Dodgers, playing his final major league game for Los Angeles in 1997.

=== Post-MLB ===
Anthony played the 1998 season for the Japanese League Yakult Swallows in 1998. After his time in Japan, Anthony returned to the Dodgers organization, playing for AAA Albuquerque in both 1998 and 1999. Although he hit over .300 both seasons, injuries prevented him from receiving another major league call-up. Anthony played four games for Somerset in the independent leagues in 2000 and seven games for Monterrey in the Mexican League in 2001 before retiring.

== Personal life ==
Anthony discovered in 2017, as a result of a DNA test, that his biological father was former MLB All-Star Willie Davis.

== See also ==
- List of second-generation Major League Baseball players
