= Jim Palmer =

American baseball player and analyst (born 1945)

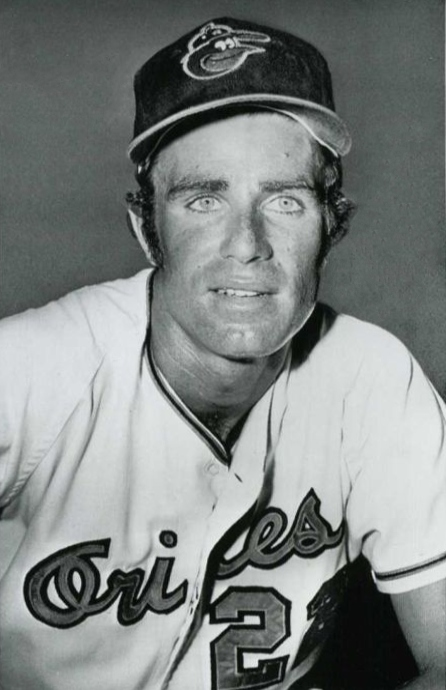
- Palmer with the Baltimore Orioles in 1972
- Pitcher
- Born: October 15, 1945 (age 81); New York City, New York, U.S.
- Batted: Right Threw: Right

MLB debut
- April 17, 1965, for the Baltimore Orioles

Last MLB appearance
- May 12, 1984, for the Baltimore Orioles

MLB statistics
- Win–loss record: 268–152
- Earned run average: 2.86
- Strikeouts: 2,212
- Stats at Baseball Reference

Teams
- Baltimore Orioles (1965–1967, 1969–1984)

Career highlights and awards
- 6× All-Star (1970–1972, 1975, 1977, 1978); 3× World Series champion (1966, 1970, 1983); 3× AL Cy Young Award (1973, 1975, 1976); 4× Gold Glove Award (1976–1979); 3× AL wins leader (1975–1977); 2× AL ERA leader (1973, 1975); Pitched a no-hitter on August 13, 1969; Baltimore Orioles No. 22 retired; Baltimore Orioles Hall of Fame

Member of the National

Baseball Hall of Fame
- Induction: 1990
- Vote: 92.6% (first ballot)

James Alvin Palmer (born October 15, 1945) is an American former professional baseball pitcher who played 19 years in Major League Baseball (MLB) for the Baltimore Orioles (1965–1967, 1969–1984). Palmer was the winningest MLB pitcher in the 1970s with 186 wins. He also won at least 20 games in eight different seasons and won three Cy Young Awards and four Gold Gloves during the decade. His 268 Orioles victories are the most in team history. A six-time American League (AL) All-Star, he was also one of the rare pitchers who never allowed a grand slam in any major league contest.

Palmer appeared in the postseason eight times and was a vital member of three World Series Champions, six AL pennant winners and seven Eastern Division titleholders. He is the only pitcher in history to earn a win in a World Series game in three different decades. He is also the youngest to pitch a complete-game shutout in a World Series, doing so nine days before his 21st birthday in 1966, in which he defeated Sandy Koufax in Koufax's last appearance. He was one of the starters on the last rotation to feature four 20-game winners in a single season in 1971. He was elected to the Baseball Hall of Fame in 1990, his first year of eligibility.

Since his retirement as an active player in 1984, Palmer has worked as a color commentator on telecasts of MLB games for ABC and ESPN and for the Orioles on Home Team Sports (HTS), Comcast SportsNet (CSN) Mid-Atlantic and the Mid-Atlantic Sports Network (MASN). He has also been a popular spokesman, most famously for Jockey International for almost 20 years. He was nicknamed "Cakes" in the 1960s because of his habit of eating pancakes for breakfast on the days he pitched.

== Early life ==
James Alvin Palmer was born in Manhattan, New York City, on October 15, 1945. Research conducted by his third wife Susan in 2017 revealed that his biological father and mother were Michael Joseph Geheran and Mary Ann Moroney, both Irish immigrants from Counties Leitrim and Clare, respectively. Joe was a married 41-year-old man about town, while Mary Ann was an unmarried 37-year-old domestic worker for the Feinstein family which was prominent in the garment industry. Moroney gave up her infant for adoption and concealed information in the New York City birth registry, where Palmer is listed as Baby Boy Kennedy, whose father was Maroney and mother was Kennedy.

Maroney was the incorrect spelling of her surname as listed when she registered at Ellis Island, while Kennedy was her sister Katharine's married name. Moroney eventually married John Lane and the couple had a daughter, Patricia, Palmer's biological half-sister, who died of leukemia at age 40 in 1987. As of May 2018, the Palmers were still searching for Patricia Lane's daughter, whose married name is Kimberly Hughes and who would be Jim Palmer's half-niece. Geheran died in 1959 and Moroney died in 1979.

Two days after his birth, Palmer was adopted by Moe Wiesen and his wife Polly, a wealthy Manhattan dress designer and a boutique owner, respectively, who lived on Park Avenue. His sister Bonnie was also adopted by the Wiesens. The family's butler taught the young Jim to throw a baseball in Central Park. After his adoptive father died of a heart attack in 1955, nine-year-old Jim, his mother and his sister moved to Beverly Hills, California, where he began playing in youth-league baseball. In 1956, his mother married actor Max Palmer, but Jim continued to go under the name Jim Wiesen until a year later. At a Little League banquet, just before being presented with an award, he asked the coaches to identify him as "James Alvin Palmer." "Through all these years, that night was the highlight of my entire life," Max recalled. Max was a character actor and there were two men who shared that name who worked in show business during similar time periods. The Max who was Jim's second dad worked mostly on TV on such programs as Dragnet, Bat Masterson and The Colgate Comedy Hour. He was Jewish, and he also earned a living by selling shoes. The other Max Palmer, often erroneously credited as Jim's father, worked in several movies as a monster. He was 8'2" tall and later became a professional wrestler and eventually a Christian evangelist.

Jim played baseball for the Beverly Hills Yankees, where he pitched and also hit home runs as an outfielder. The family eventually moved to Scottsdale, Arizona, where Jim played baseball, basketball, and football at Scottsdale High School. He earned All-State honors in each of these sports, also graduating with a 3.4 grade-point average in 1963. The University of Southern California, UCLA, and Arizona State University each offered him full scholarships; Stanford University offered a partial scholarship as well.

Bobby Winkles of Arizona State suggested that Palmer get more experience playing collegiate summer baseball, so Palmer went to South Dakota to join the Winner Pheasants of the Basin League. The team advanced all the way to the league finals, and Palmer caught the attention of Baltimore Orioles scout Harry Dalton while pitching in the second game of the championship. According to Palmer, 13 Major League Baseball (MLB) teams recruited him after the season wrapped up, but Jim Russo (the scout who also signed Dave McNally and Boog Powell) and Jim Wilson of the Orioles made the best impression on his parents with their polite manners. Palmer signed with Baltimore for $50,000.

Russo states in his autobiography that Wilson was the first member of the Orioles' organization to scout Palmer, as an 18-year old Arizona high school player in 1963, and that Wilson requested Russo get Palmer on the Winner, South Dakota, Basin League team. It was unusual for a high school player to be on a Basin League team, but Wilson convinced Russo that Palmer would do well, and Russo instructed manager Harry Wise to put Palmer on the team. When Russo finally saw Palmer pitch for Winner in August 1963, he said "Palmer was so good he gave me chills".

Russo wrote that he got to know Palmer when Palmer drove him to the airport after that visit. Shortly after that, Palmer told Wilson he wanted to sign with the Orioles, but when Russo and Wilson came to meet with Palmer and his family at their home in Scottsdale, Arizona, they learned that Palmer had suffered a knee injury as the result of an automobile accident, and needed surgery. Russo remained determined to sign Palmer and chose not to let farm system director Harry Dalton know about the injury. The Palmer family had met with Houston Colt .45s manager Paul Richards (Russo's former boss with the Orioles) earlier that same evening, and found Richards's demeanor offensive. By contrast Russo and Wilson were cordial, polite and respectful, and Palmer and his parents decided to sign with the Orioles. Russo and the Palmers agreed to a $40,000 bonus and that the Orioles would pay Palmer's tuition at the college of his choice. Russo later said, "A scout can spend a lifetime waiting to see a Jim Palmer".

== Career in baseball ==
=== 1960s ===
A high-kicking pitcher known for an exceptionally smooth delivery, Palmer picked up his first major-league win on May 16, 1965, beating the Yankees in relief at home. He hit the first of his three career major-league home runs, a two-run shot, in the fourth inning of that game, off Yankees starter Jim Bouton. Palmer finished the season with a 5–4 record. In 1966, Palmer joined the starting rotation. Baltimore won the pennant behind Frank Robinson's Triple Crown MVP season. Palmer won his final game, against the Kansas City Athletics, to clinch the AL pennant. In Game 2 of that World Series, at Dodger Stadium, he became at 20 years, 11 months, the youngest pitcher to pitch a shutout, defeating the defending world champion Dodgers 6–0. The underdog Orioles swept an LA team that featured Sandy Koufax, Don Drysdale and Claude Osteen. The shutout was part of a World Series record-setting 33 1/3 consecutive shutout innings by Orioles pitchers. The Dodgers' last run was against Moe Drabowsky in the third inning of Game 1. Palmer, Wally Bunker and Dave McNally pitched shutouts in the next three games.

During the next two seasons, Palmer struggled with arm trouble. He had injured his arm in 1966 painting his home in Baltimore with a roller. Cortisone injections allowed him to pitch through the rest of the season and the World Series, but in 1967, his arm continued to feel heavy. He threw a one-hit game against the New York Yankees on May 12 but was sent to the minor leagues after a poor start against the Boston Red Sox five days later. While trying to make it back with the Rochester Red Wings in Rochester, New York, Palmer surrendered the only grand slam in his entire professional career, to the Buffalo Bisons' catcher, future Cincinnati Red and Baseball Hall of Famer Johnny Bench.

Palmer only pitched three more games for the Orioles in 1967. In 1968, he was limited to 10 minor league games, with no appearances for the Orioles. The outlook on his career was so bleak Palmer considered quitting baseball to attend college, or trying to be a position player. He had been placed on waivers in September 1968 and was left unprotected for the Kansas City Royals and Seattle Pilots in the expansion draft one month later, but was not claimed. After he pitched for an Instructional League team, the Orioles sent him to pitch for the Santurce Crabbers in the Puerto Rican Winter League. Before he left for Santurce, however, Palmer attended a Baltimore Bullets game and sat next to Marvin Foxman, a pharmaceutical representative who suggested he try Indocin. In Santurce, Palmer's arm stopped hurting, and his fastball began hitting 95 mph again. "It was a miracle as far as I was concerned," said Palmer.

Palmer returned healthy in 1969, rejoining an Orioles rotation that included 20-game winners Dave McNally and Mike Cuellar. He missed July with a six-week stint on the disabled list for a torn back muscle; his arm was fine. On August 13, Palmer threw a no-hitter against Oakland, just four days after coming off the disabled list. It was the only no-hitter of his career. He finished the season with a mark of 16–4, 123 strikeouts, a 2.34 ERA, and .800 winning percentage. The heavily favored Orioles were beaten in the 1969 World Series by the New York Mets with Palmer taking the loss in Game 3.

=== 1970s ===
In 1970, Cuellar went 24–8, McNally 24–9, Palmer 20–10 and in 1971 the trio went 20–9, 21–5 and 20–9, respectively, with Pat Dobson going 20–8. Only one other team in MLB history, the 1920 Chicago White Sox, has had four 20-game winners. Palmer won 21 games in 1972 and went 22–9, 158, 2.40 in 1973, walking off with his first Cy Young Award. He had a perfect game attempt before surrendering a Ken Suarez one-out single to left field in the ninth inning of a 9–1 home win over the Texas Rangers on 16 June 1973. His success was interrupted in 1974 when his arm started giving him trouble in spring training. Eventually, he was down for eight weeks with elbow problems. Palmer had lost seven consecutive games by the time he went on the disabled list on June 20. He was diagnosed with an ulnar nerve injury and orthopedic surgeon Robert Kerlan prescribed rest, hot and cold water therapy and medication. Surgery was considered but Palmer's pain lessened and he was able to return to pitch in August. He finished 7–12.

Palmer was at his peak again in 1975, winning 23 games, throwing 10 shutouts (allowing just 44 hits in those games), and fashioning a 2.09 ERA—all tops in the American League. He completed 25 games, even saved one, and limited opposing hitters to a .216 batting average. On July 28, 1976, he received a fine from AL president Lee MacPhail after hitting Mickey Rivers with a pitch the day before. Palmer said it was in retaliation for Dock Ellis hitting Reggie Jackson with a pitch earlier in the game then complained when Ellis (who did not admit to throwing at Jackson) was not fined. Palmer won his second Cy Young Award, and repeated his feat in 1976 (22–13, 2.51). During the latter year, he won the first of four consecutive Gold Glove Awards. (Jim Kaat, who had won the award 14 consecutive seasons, moved to the National League, where he won the award that year and in 1977.)

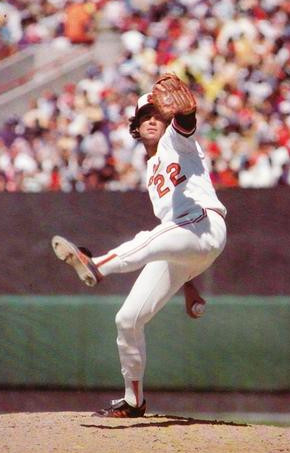
Palmer pitching for the Orioles in 1977.

After making $185,000 in 1976, Palmer hoped for a raise in 1977. The Orioles offered $200,000 initially but Palmer wanted $275,000. They finally agreed on a $260,000 salary, with a bonus for a "significant contribution." In 1977 and 1978, Palmer won 20 and 21 games, respectively. Despite the 20 wins in 1977, the Orioles almost refused to give him a bonus. After the Major League Baseball Players Association filed a grievance in Palmer's dispute and threatened to go to arbitration (which likely would have resulted in Palmer becoming a free agent), GM Hank Peters relented and gave him the bonus. During the period spanning 1970 to 1978, Palmer had won 20 games in every season except for 1974. During those eight 20-win seasons, he pitched between 274 1/3 and 319 innings per year, leading the league in innings pitched four times and earned run average twice. During that span, he threw between 17 and 25 complete games each year. Frustrated that pitchers who had become free agents like Vida Blue and Bert Blyleven were making more money than he in 1979, Palmer told a reporter for the St. Paul Pioneer Press "I'm going to aggravate [the Orioles] until they trade me." Manager Earl Weaver responded by pinning a note to his locker that said, "Happy Father's Day. Now grow up." "He's right he's underpaid...He's worth a million dollars when he's pitching but he signed for $260,000." Palmer eventually got over being discontented and the team won the AL pennant. Weaver tabbed Palmer to start Game 1 of the ALCS against the Angels, although Palmer asked him to start Mike Flanagan, the 1979 Cy Young Award winner, instead, Weaver valued Palmer's experience. Matched up against Nolan Ryan, Palmer allowed three runs in nine innings, taking a no-decision as he left with the game tied. The Orioles won in the 10th on a John Lowenstein home run and won the series 3–1.

=== 1980s ===
From 1980 through 1985, Palmer was hampered by arm fatigue and myriad minor injuries. Even so, he brought a stabilizing veteran presence to the pitching staff. In 1981, Palmer got into a feud with Doug DeCinces after DeCinces missed a line drive hit by Alan Trammell in a game against the Tigers. According to DeCinces, Palmer "was cussing me out and throwing his hands in the air" after the play. "Those balls have to be caught," Palmer told a paper. "Doug is reluctant to get in front of a ball." "I'd like to know where Jim Palmer gets off criticizing others," DeCinces responded. "Ask anybody–they're all sick of it. We're a twenty-four man team–and one prima donna. He thinks it's always someone else's fault." The feud simmered until June, when Weaver said, "I see no cause for concern. The third baseman wants the pitcher to do a little better and the pitcher wants the third baseman to do a little better. I hope we can all do better and kiss and make up...The judge gave me custody of both of them." Palmer ultimately jokingly blamed Brooks Robinson for the dispute: "If Brooks hadn't been the best third-baseman of all time, the rest of the Orioles wouldn't have taken it for granted that any ball hit anywhere within the same county as Brooks would be judged perfectly, fielded perfectly, and thrown perfectly, nailing (perfectly) what seemed like every single opposing batter."

In 1982, after Palmer posted a 6.84 ERA in five starts, GM Hank Peters announced that "Palmer is never, ever, ever going to start another game in an Orioles uniform. I've had it." Weaver moved Palmer to the bullpen, but with the team needing another starter, he put Palmer back in the rotation in June. Shortly thereafter, Palmer went on an 11-game winning streak.

Palmer's final major-league victory was noteworthy: pitching in relief of Mike Flanagan in the third game of the 1983 World Series, he faced the Phillies' celebrity-studded batting order and gave up no runs in a close Oriole win.

The 17 years between Palmer's first World Series win in 1966 and the 1983 win is the longest period of time between first and last pitching victories in the World Series for an individual pitcher in major league history. He also became the only pitcher in major league baseball history to have won World Series games in three decades. Also, Palmer became the only player in Orioles history to appear in all six (1966, 1969, 1970, 1971, 1979, 1983) of their World Series appearances to date.

Palmer was the only Orioles player on the 1983 championship team to have previously won a World Series. He retired after being released by Baltimore during the 1984 season. He retired with a 268–152 win–loss record and a 2.86 ERA. Palmer was elected to the Hall of Fame in 1990, his first year of eligibility.

=== Early broadcasting career ===
While still an active player, Palmer did color commentary for ABC for their coverage of the 1978, 1980 and 1982 American League Championship Series, 1981 American League Division Series between Oakland and Kansas City, and the 1981 World Series.

From 1985 to 1989, Palmer formed an announcing team with Al Michaels and Tim McCarver at ABC. Palmer announced the 1985 World Series, where he was supposed to team with Michaels and Howard Cosell, whom Palmer had worked with on the previous year's ALCS. McCarver replaced Cosell for the World Series at the last minute after Cosell released a book (I Never Played the Game) that was critical of the ABC Sports team. The team of Palmer, Michaels and McCarver would subsequently go on to call the 1986 All-Star Game (that year, Palmer worked with Michaels on the ALCS while McCarver teamed with Keith Jackson on ABC's coverage of the National League Championship Series), the 1987 World Series, and 1988 All-Star Game as well as that year's NLCS.

Palmer was present at San Francisco's Candlestick Park on October 17, 1989, when the Loma Prieta earthquake hit prior to Game 3 of the World Series. After the 1989 season, ABC lost its contract to broadcast baseball to CBS. Palmer had earned $350,000 from ABC that year for appearing on around ten regular season broadcasts and making a few postseason appearances.

In 1990, the Los Angeles Times reported that Palmer was thinking of pursuing work as a major league manager. Instead, Palmer worked as an analyst for ESPN and as a broadcaster for Orioles games on their local telecasts over WMAR-TV and Home Team Sports.

=== Comeback attempt ===
In 1991, Palmer attempted a comeback with the Orioles. He explained in his 1996 book, "I wanted to see if I could be like Nolan Ryan was to the game or what George Blanda was to football." ESPN, which was trying to cut expenses, had asked him to take a pay cut and to sign a three-year contract. Palmer said he would sign a one-year contract for less pay, but ESPN refused. "I wouldn't be here today if the broadcasting climate had been more to my liking. That was really my prime motivation, the fact that I no longer had that obligation," Palmer said during spring training.

Covering Palmer's spring training workouts, Richard Hoffer of Sports Illustrated said that Palmer's comeback was not entirely about money. He wrote that "it is fair to suspect that a certain vanity is involved." Hoffer said that Palmer "has failed to excite either ridicule or astonishment. He's in fabulous condition, no question. But no matter whom he lines up with on the row of practice mounds, there is more pop in the gloves of catchers other than his." "I couldn't throw ninety-five miles an hour anymore," Palmer later reflected. "The best I could do was eighty."

While working out at the University of Miami during his comeback attempt, Palmer was approached by Miami assistant coach Lazaro Collazo. Collazo reportedly told him, "You'll never get into the Hall of Fame with those mechanics." "I'm already in the Hall of Fame," Palmer replied. To help Palmer's pitching motion, Collazo and Palmer completed unusual drills that involved Palmer placing a knee or foot on a chair as he tossed the ball.

After giving up five hits and two runs in two innings of a spring training game, he retired permanently. Palmer said that he tore his hamstring while warming up for the game, commenting, "I'm not saying I wouldn't like to continue, but I can't," he said. "I heard something pop in my leg yesterday. It wasn't a nice sound. I don't know what that means, but I think it's going to play havoc with my tennis game."

=== Return to broadcasting ===
From 1994 to 1995, Palmer returned to ABC (this time, via a revenue-sharing joint venture between Major League Baseball, ABC and NBC called The Baseball Network) to once again broadcast with Tim McCarver and Al Michaels. In 1995, the reunited team of Palmer, McCarver and Michaels would call the All-Star Game, Game 3 of that NLDS between Cincinnati and Los Angeles, Game 4 of the NLDS between Atlanta and Colorado, Games 1–2 of the NLCS, and Games 1, 4–5 of the World Series. Palmer, McCarver and Michaels were also intended to call the previous year's World Series for ABC, but were denied the opportunity when the entire postseason was canceled due to a strike. He is currently a color commentator on MASN's television broadcasts of Oriole games.

In July 2012, Palmer put up for auction his three Cy Young Award trophies and two of his four Gold Glove Awards. "At this point in my life, I would rather concern myself with the education of my grandchildren," he said. Palmer also noted that his autistic teenage stepson would require special care and that "my priorities have changed." Palmer had put up for auction one of his Cy Young Award trophies on behalf of a fundraising event for cystic fibrosis in years past, although he stated the winning bidder "had paid $39,000 for that and never ever took it. It was for the cause."

=== Legacy ===
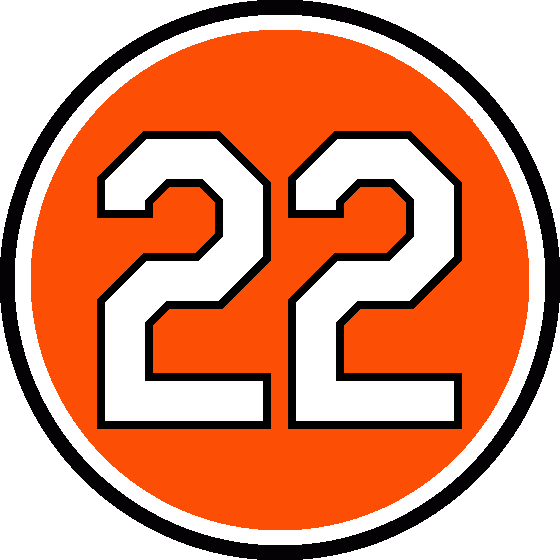
Jim Palmer's number 22 was retired by the Baltimore Orioles in 1985.

Palmer is the only pitcher in major-league history to win World Series games in three decades (1960s, 1970s, and 1980s). During his 19-year major league career of 575 games (including 17 postseason games), he never surrendered a grand slam, nor did he ever allow back-to-back homers. In six ALCS and six World Series, he posted an 8–3 record with 90 strikeouts, and an ERA of 2.61 and two shutouts in 17 games.

He was a mainstay in the rotation during Baltimore's six pennant-winning teams in the 1960s (1966 and 1969), 1970s (1970, 1971 and 1979) and 1980s (1983). With the passing of Mike Cuellar in 2010, Palmer became the last surviving member of the 1971 Baltimore starting rotation that included four 20-game winners. Palmer won spots on six All-Star teams, received four Gold Glove Awards and won three Cy Young Awards. He led the league in ERA twice and in wins three times.

Palmer has the fifth lowest ERA among starting pitchers since 1920 (through the 2024 season), behind Clayton Kershaw, and Hall of Fame pitchers Hoyt Wilhelm, Whitey Ford, and Sandy Koufax. Wilhelm pitched in over 1,000 games, but started only 52.

Sometimes, Palmer would shift fielders around during games. He never meddled with the best fielders, such as the Robinsons or Paul Blair, but he would do so for less experienced players. "They might not know...that if they're playing a step or two to the opposite field and you're behind the batter two balls and no strikes...and you have a big lead...you're probably going to take a little off the pitch...and the fielders have to know to shift a couple of steps and play for the batter to pull."

In 1999, he ranked No. 64 on The Sporting News' list of the 100 Greatest Baseball Players, and was nominated as a finalist for the Major League Baseball All-Century Team.

== Endorsements ==
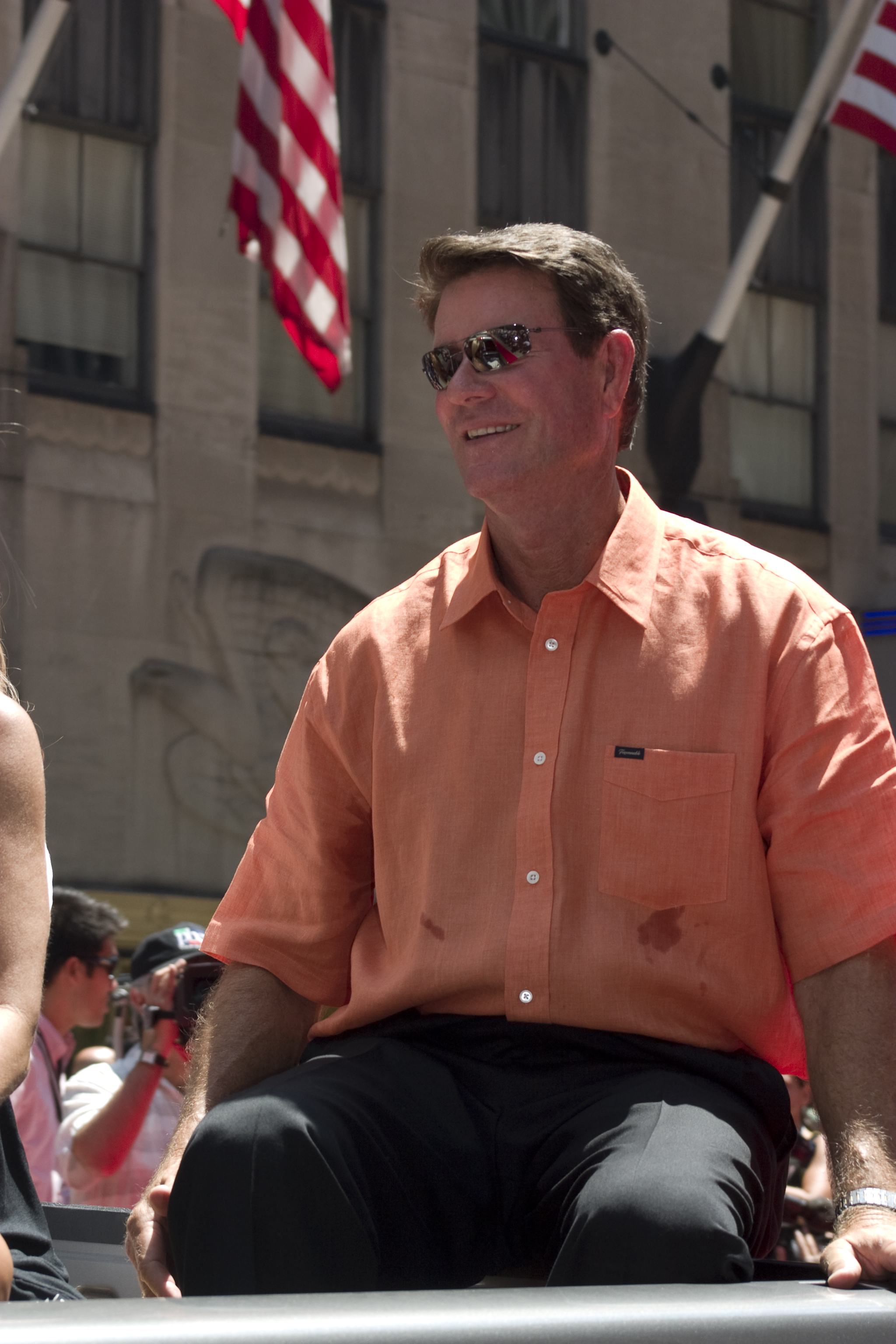
Palmer at the Major League Baseball All-Star Game Red Carpet Parade, July 15, 2008.

During the late 1970s and 1980s, Palmer was a spokesman and underwear model for Jockey brand men's briefs. He appeared in the company's national print and television advertisements as well as on billboards at Times Square in New York City and other major cities. He donated all proceeds from the sale of his underwear poster to the Cystic Fibrosis Foundation.

From 1992 until 1999, he was frequently seen on television throughout the United States in commercials for The Money Store, a national home equity and mortgage lender. He has periodically appeared in ads and commercials for vitamins and other health-related products. Palmer also represents Cosamin DS, a joint health supplement made by Nutramax Laboratories in Edgewood, Maryland.

He was also the spokesperson for Nationwide Motors Corp., which is a regional chain of car dealerships located in the Middle Atlantic region. He is currently a spokesman for the national "Strike Out High Cholesterol" campaign. Additionally, Palmer serves as a member of the advisory board of the Baseball Assistance Team, a 501(c)(3) non-profit organization dedicated to helping former Major League, Minor League, and Negro league players through financial and medical difficulties.

== Personal life ==
Shortly after graduating from high school in 1963, Palmer married the former Susan Ryan in 1964. He has two daughters with Ryan, named Jamie and Kelly. Ryan was not a huge baseball fan, as Palmer recalled: "She used to bring her knitting and/or a friend, who usually liked baseball even less, to the games." The pair divorced in 1984. Palmer married his second wife, Joan H. Pearlstone, in April of 1990 and divorced in May of 2000.

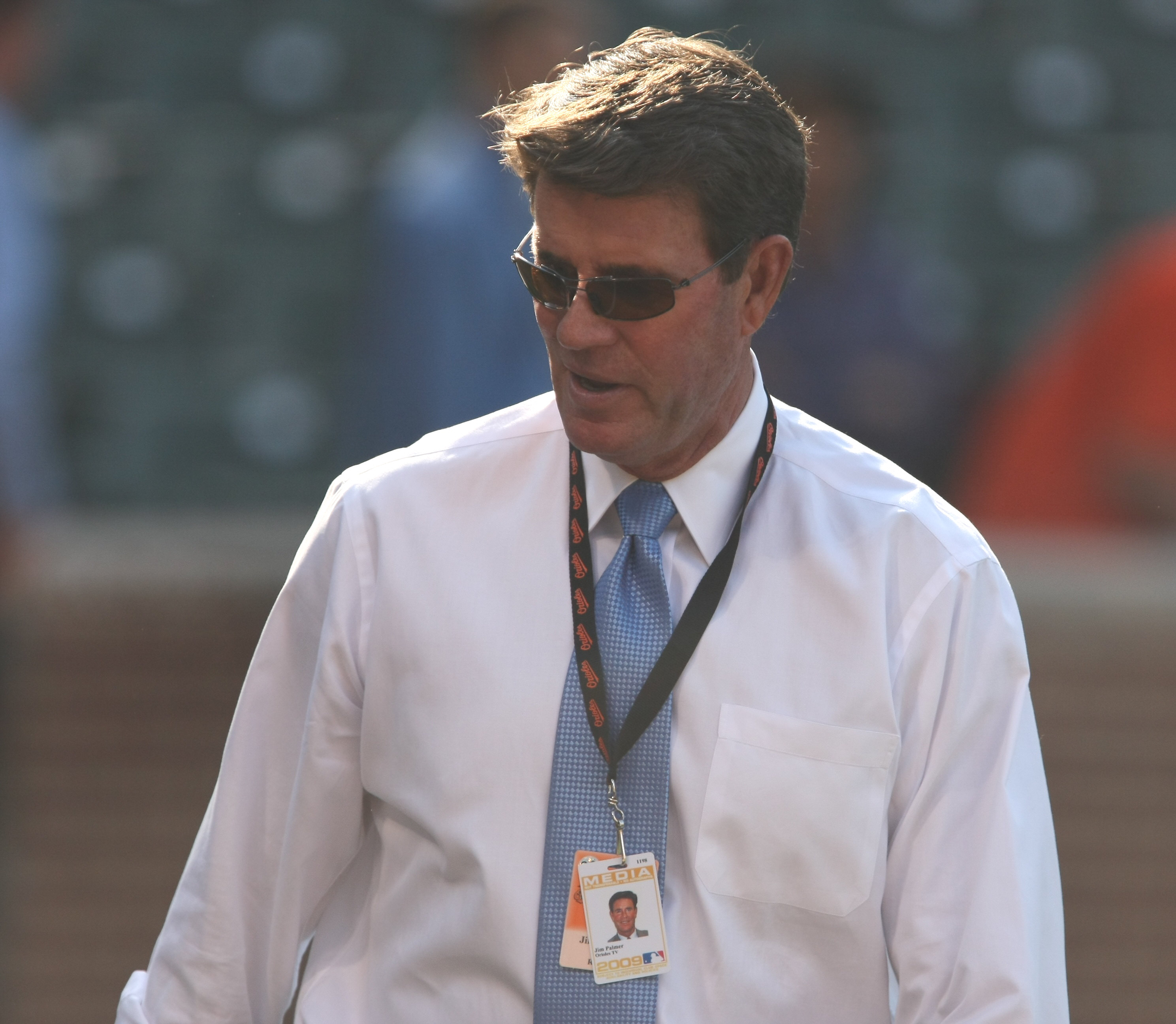
Palmer at Camden Yards in 2009

In 2007, Palmer married the former Susan Earle, who has an adult son with autism. The Palmers have homes in Palm Beach, Florida, and Corona Del Mar, California. In 2006, Palmer also acquired a penthouse condominium in Little Italy, Baltimore, which he uses while in Baltimore for Orioles' broadcasts.

== See also ==
- List of Major League Baseball career wins leaders
- List of Major League Baseball annual ERA leaders
- List of Major League Baseball annual wins leaders
- List of Major League Baseball career strikeout leaders
- Major League Baseball titles leaders
- List of Major League Baseball no-hitters
- List of Major League Baseball players who spent their entire career with one franchise

Preceded by Don Wilson	No-hitter pitcher August 13, 1969	Succeeded by Ken Holtzman
