= Dave Rohde =

American baseball player (born 1964)

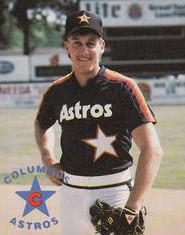
- Rohde in 1988
- Second Baseman / Third baseman
- Born: May 8, 1964 (age 62); Los Altos, California, U.S.
- Batted: Both Threw: Right

MLB debut
- April 9, 1990, for the Houston Astros

Last MLB appearance
- May 22, 1992, for the Cleveland Indians

MLB statistics
- Games played: 93
- Runs scored: 11
- Runs batted in: 5
- Batting average: .158
- On-base percentage: .262
- Stats at Baseball Reference

Teams
- Houston Astros (1990–1991); Cleveland Indians (1992)

David Grant Rohde (born May 8, 1964) is an American former utility infielder in Major League Baseball, playing mainly as a second baseman from 1990 through 1992 for the Houston Astros and Cleveland Indians. Listed at 6' 2", 180 lb., he was a switch hitter and threw right handed.

Born in Los Altos, California, Rohde grew up in Newport Beach, California. He attended University of Arizona, where he played for the Arizona Wildcats baseball team that won the 1986 College World Series. He then was selected by the Astros in the 5th round of the 1986 MLB draft.

Rohde made his big league debut with the Astros on opening night 1990 as a pinch-hitter against Cincinnati Reds reliever Rob Dibble. The following night, he got his first hit, a double, off Reds starter Tim Layana. For the season, Rohde hit a .184 batting average with five runs batted in in just 98 games.

During his majors stint, Rohde was a steady utility player with most of his at bats coming as a pinch hitter. The best game of his career came on July 18, 1990, when he went 3-for-3 against Frank Viola and Alejandro Peña of the New York Mets. His play helped Astros starter Mike Scott to pitch a 1-0 complete game shutout win as Rohde scored the sole run.

Rohde appeared in just 29 games for the 1991 Astros and hit .122 (5-for-43) and scored three times but did not drive in a run. Before the start of the 1992 season he was traded to the Indians along with Kenny Lofton in exchange for Eddie Taubensee and Willie Blair. Rohde played in just five games with the Tribe to end his big league career. His final appearance was in the Kingdome against Seattle Mariners hurler Randy Johnson when he filled in at third base for then rookie Jim Thome. During his career, the slick fielding infielder committed just one error in 144 total chances to post a sparkling .993 fielding average.

== Sources ==
- 1991 Houston Astros media guide
- 1992 Houston Astros media guide
