= Willie Blair =

American baseball player (born 1965)

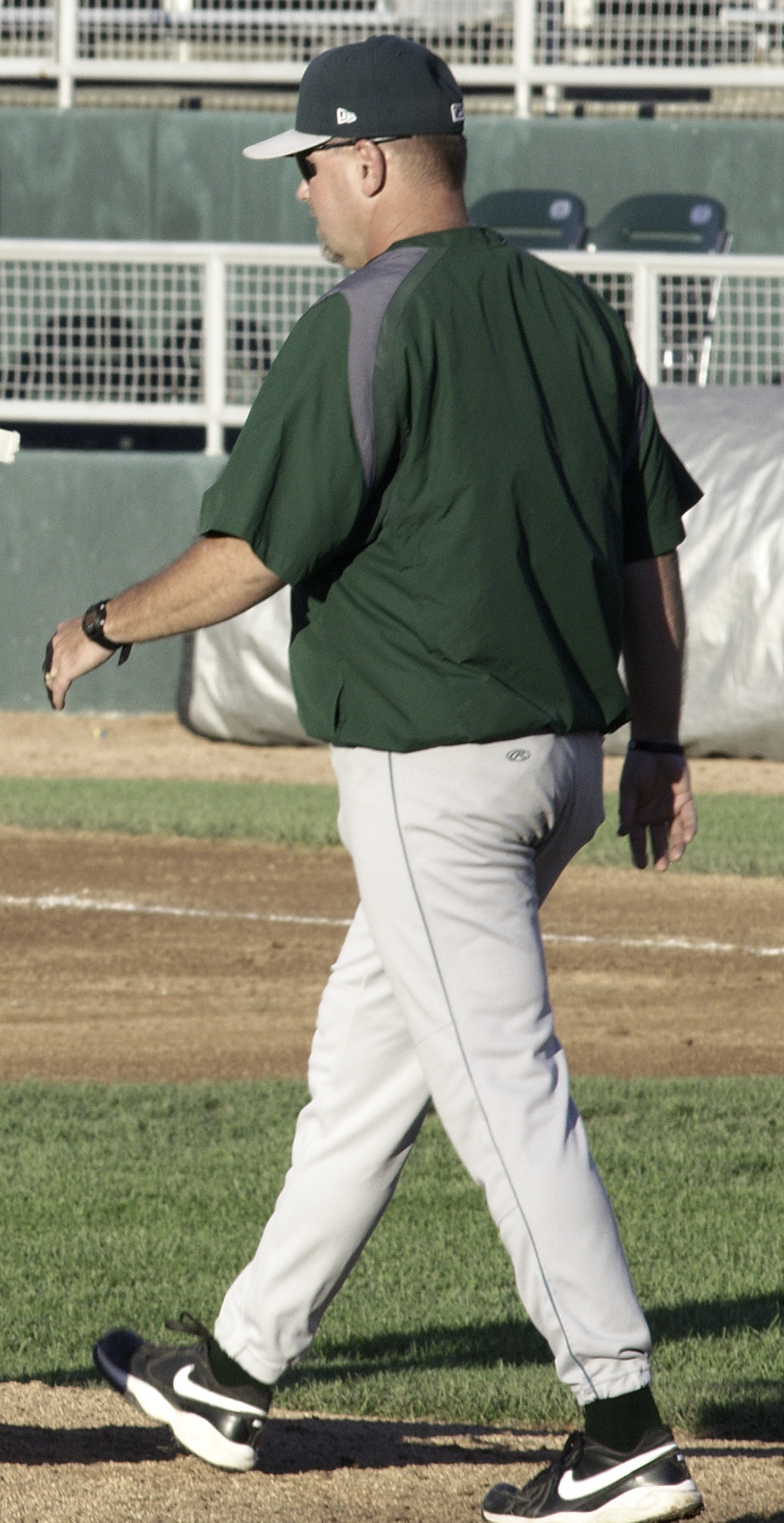
- Blair with the Fort Wayne TinCaps in 2011
- Pitcher
- Born: December 18, 1965 (age 59); Paintsville, Kentucky, U.S.
- Batted: Right Threw: Right

MLB debut
- April 11, 1990, for the Toronto Blue Jays

Last MLB appearance
- July 26, 2001, for the Detroit Tigers

MLB statistics
- Win–loss record: 60–86
- Earned run average: 5.04
- Strikeouts: 759
- Stats at Baseball Reference

Teams
- Toronto Blue Jays (1990); Cleveland Indians (1991); Houston Astros (1992); Colorado Rockies (1993–1994); San Diego Padres (1995–1996); Detroit Tigers (1997); Arizona Diamondbacks (1998); New York Mets (1998); Detroit Tigers (1999–2001)

William Allen Blair (born December 18, 1965) is an American former right-handed pitcher in Major League Baseball and current pitching coach for the Dayton Dragons.

== Playing career ==
Blair played baseball for Morehead State University before the Toronto Blue Jays drafted him in the 11th round of the 1986 amateur draft. He spent four seasons in the Blue Jays minor league system, playing for the St. Catharines Blue Jays (1986), the Dunedin Blue Jays (1987–1988), the Knoxville Smokies (1988), and the Syracuse Chiefs (1989).

Blair made his major league debut with the Blue Jays on April 11, 1990, and spent the season with the major league squad. He was traded in the offseason to the Cleveland Indians for Alex Sanchez, and played in 11 games for the Indians that year. Blair was then traded to the Houston Astros with Eddie Taubensee for Kenny Lofton and Dave Rohde. After a season with Houston, he was picked up by the Colorado Rockies in their expansion draft. After the Rockies (1993–1994), he played for the San Diego Padres (1995–1996), Detroit Tigers (1997, 1999–2001), Arizona Diamondbacks (1998), and New York Mets (1998).

His best year was 1997, in which he had 16–8 record and an earned run average (ERA) of 4.17. In 1999, Blair was the starting pitcher for the final Opening Day in Tiger Stadium history.

== Coaching career ==
He was the pitching coach for the Fort Wayne TinCaps for the 2011 and 2012 seasons, and on December 11, 2012, he was named bullpen coach of the San Diego Padres, replacing Jimmy Jones.

On December 2, 2015, Blair was named the pitching coach for the Double-A Erie SeaWolves. He was transferred to the Single-A Whitecaps in December 2018.

On January 23, 2025, he was announced as the pitching coach for the Dayton Dragons, the High-A affiliate of the Cincinnati Reds.
