= Eddie Taubensee =

American baseball player (born 1968)

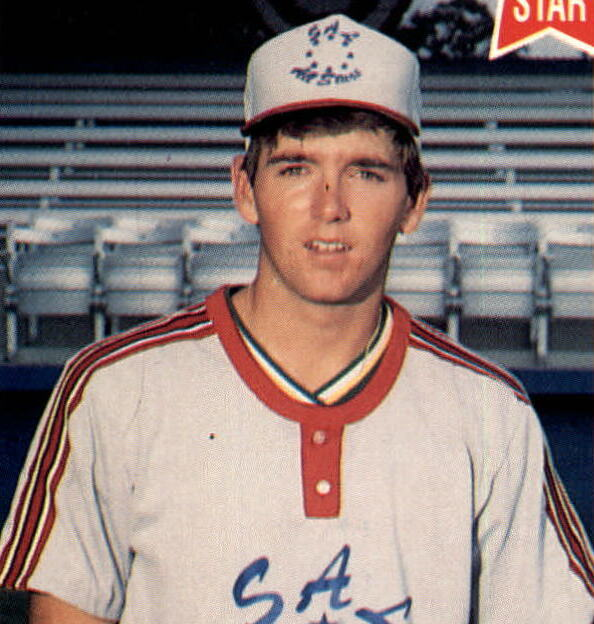
- Taubensee c. 1988
- Catcher
- Born: October 31, 1968 (age 57); Beeville, Texas, U.S.
- Batted: Left Threw: Right

MLB debut
- May 18, 1991, for the Cleveland Indians

Last MLB appearance
- October 7, 2001, for the Cleveland Indians

MLB statistics
- Batting average: .273
- Home runs: 94
- Runs batted in: 419
- Stats at Baseball Reference

Teams
- Cleveland Indians (1991); Houston Astros (1992–1994); Cincinnati Reds (1994–2000); Cleveland Indians (2001)

Edward Kenneth Taubensee (born October 31, 1968) is an American former Major League Baseball catcher. Taubensee played for three different ball clubs during his career: the Cleveland Indians (1991, 2001), Houston Astros (1992-1994), and Cincinnati Reds (1994-2000).

He was originally drafted by the Cincinnati Reds in the sixth round of the June draft in 1986. The Oakland Athletics selected him in the Rule 5 Draft on December 3, 1990. He was claimed by the Cleveland Indians on April 4, 1991, and made his major league debut on May 18, 1991, with the Indians. He is well known for being traded along with Willie Blair from the Indians to the Astros in exchange for outfielder Kenny Lofton and infielder Dave Rohde on December 10, 1991, a trade that many consider to be one of the most lopsided moves made in the 1990s. Lofton went on to have an excellent career, while Taubensee played less than three full seasons with the Astros before he was traded to the Reds on April 19, 1994, for Ross Powell and Marty Lister.

Taubensee's best season came in 1999 as a member of Cincinnati Reds, when he surprisingly became one of club's best hitters for a team which was a surprise contender and nearly made the playoffs (ultimately losing tiebreaker game for the Wild Card spot to the New York Mets). He would be traded back to the Indians on November 16, 2000, for Jim Brower and Robert Pugmire and would finish his career there playing his last game on October 7, 2001.

In 2017, Taubensee was named the hitting coach of the Augusta Greenjackets, a Class A affiliate of the San Francisco Giants in the South Atlantic League.
