= Joe Morgan =

American baseball player and analyst (1943–2020)

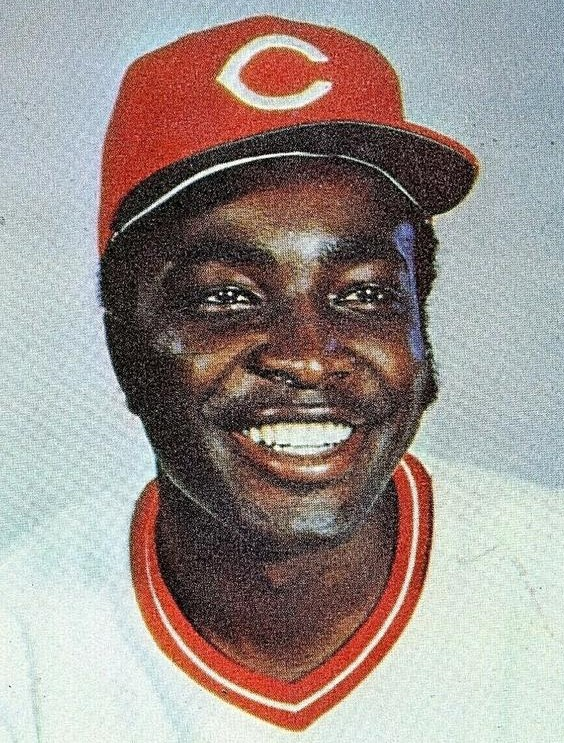
- Morgan with the Cincinnati Reds in 1972
- Second baseman
- Born: September 19, 1943; Bonham, Texas, U.S.
- Died: October 11, 2020 (aged 77); Danville, California, U.S.
- Batted: Left Threw: Right

MLB debut
- September 21, 1963, for the Houston Colt .45s

Last MLB appearance
- September 30, 1984, for the Oakland Athletics

MLB statistics
- Batting average: .271
- Hits: 2,517
- Home runs: 268
- Runs batted in: 1,133
- Stolen bases: 689
- Stats at Baseball Reference

Teams
- Houston Colt .45s / Astros (1963–1971); Cincinnati Reds (1972–1979); Houston Astros (1980); San Francisco Giants (1981–1982); Philadelphia Phillies (1983); Oakland Athletics (1984)

Career highlights and awards
- 10× All-Star (1966, 1970, 1972–1979); 2× World Series champion (1975, 1976); 2× NL MVP (1975, 1976); 5× Gold Glove Award (1973–1977); Silver Slugger Award (1982); Cincinnati Reds No. 8 retired; Cincinnati Reds Hall of Fame; Houston Astros Hall of Fame

Member of the National

Baseball Hall of Fame
- Induction: 1990
- Vote: 81.8% (first ballot)

Joe Leonard Morgan (September 19, 1943 – October 11, 2020) was an American professional baseball second baseman who played 22 seasons in Major League Baseball (MLB) for the Houston Colt .45s / Astros, Cincinnati Reds, San Francisco Giants, Philadelphia Phillies, and Oakland Athletics from 1963 to 1984. He won two World Series championships with the Reds in 1975 and 1976 and was also named the National League Most Valuable Player in each of those years. Considered one of the greatest second basemen of all time, Morgan was inducted into the Baseball Hall of Fame in 1990 in his first year of eligibility.

After retiring as an active player, Morgan became a baseball broadcaster for the Reds, Giants, ABC, and ESPN, as well as a stint in the mid-to-late 1990s on NBC's postseason telecasts, teamed with Bob Costas and Bob Uecker. He hosted a weekly nationally syndicated radio show on Sports USA, while serving as a special advisor to the Reds.

== Playing career ==
Morgan was African American and the oldest of six children. Born in Bonham, Texas, he lived there until he was five years old. His family then moved to Oakland, California. Morgan was nicknamed "Little Joe" for his diminutive 5-foot-7-inch (1.70 m) stature. As a youth, he played American Legion baseball on a team sponsored by Post 471 in Oakland. Morgan was a standout baseball player at Castlemont High School, but did not receive any offers from major league teams due to his size. He played college baseball at Oakland City College before being signed by the Houston Colt .45s as an amateur free agent in 1962, receiving a $3,000 signing bonus and a $500 per month salary.

=== Houston Colt .45s/Astros ===
Morgan made his major league baseball debut on September 21, 1963. Despite going on to win multiple World Series and MVPs for the Reds, he said his debut for the Colt .45s was the highlight of his career.

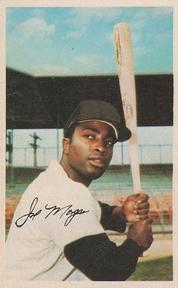
Morgan with Houston, c. 1969

Early in his career, Morgan struggled with his swing because he kept his back elbow down too low. Teammate Nellie Fox (also a stocky second baseman) suggested to Morgan that while at the plate he should flap his back arm like a chicken to keep his elbow up. Morgan followed the advice, and his flapping arm became his signature.

Morgan played his first nine major league seasons for the Houston Astros, compiling 72 home runs and 219 stolen bases. He was named an All-Star twice during this period, in 1966 and 1970. On June 25, 1966, Morgan was struck on the kneecap by a line drive (hit by Lee Maye) during batting practice. The broken kneecap forced Morgan out of the lineup for 40 games, during which the Astros went 11–29 (for a .275 winning percentage).

Although Morgan played with distinction for Houston, the Astros wanted more power in their lineup. Additionally, manager Harry Walker considered Morgan a troublemaker. As a result, they traded Morgan to the Cincinnati Reds as part of a blockbuster multi-player deal on November 29, 1971, announced at baseball's winter meetings.

=== Cincinnati Reds ===
To this day the aforementioned trade is considered a consequential deal for Cincinnati, although at the time many experts felt that the Astros got the better end of the deal. Power-hitting Lee May, All-Star second baseman Tommy Helms, and outfielder/pinch hitter Jimmy Stewart went to the Astros. In addition to Morgan, included in the deal to the Reds were César Gerónimo (who became their regular right fielder and then center fielder), starting pitcher Jack Billingham, veteran infielder Denis Menke, and minor league outfielder Ed Armbrister. Morgan joined leadoff hitter Pete Rose as prolific catalysts at the top of the Reds' lineup. Morgan's batting for the Reds resulted in more home runs than his batting for the Astros, which was partially attributed to the massive size of the Astros’ Astrodome. Morgan's speed and defense were also significant factors in his contribution to the teams performance.

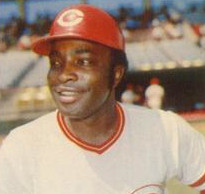
Morgan with the Cincinnati Reds in 1977

As part of the Big Red Machine, Morgan made eight consecutive All-Star Game appearances (1972–79) to go along with his 1966 and 1970 appearances with Houston. Morgan, along with teammates Pete Rose, Johnny Bench, Tony Pérez, and Dave Concepción, led the Reds to consecutive championships in the World Series. He drove in Ken Griffey for the winning run in Game 7 of the 1975 World Series. Morgan was also the National League MVP in 1975 and 1976. He was the first second baseman in the history of the National League to win the MVP back to back. In Morgan's NL MVP years he combined for a .324 batting average, 44 home runs, 205 runs batted in, 246 bases on balls, and 127 stolen bases.

Morgan was an extremely capable hitter—especially in clutch situations. While his lifetime average was only .271, he hit between .288 and .327 during his peak years with the Reds. Additionally, he drew many walks, resulting in an excellent .392 on-base percentage. He also hit 268 home runs to go with his 449 doubles and 96 triples, excellent power for a middle infielder of his era, and was considered by some the finest base stealer of his generation (689 steals at greater than 80% success rate). Besides his prowess at the plate and on the bases, Morgan was an exceptional infielder, winning the Gold Glove Award in consecutive years from 1973 to 1977. His short height proved an asset to him, as he had one of baseball's smallest strike zones. "The umpires gave him everything. If he didn't swing at the pitch, it was a ball," recalled Tommy John.

=== Later career ===
Morgan returned to Houston in 1980 as a free agent on a reported contract of $255,000 for one season. He helped the young Astros win the NL West, batting .243 in 141 games while leading the league in walks with 93. The Astros then lost the National League Championship Series to the Philadelphia Phillies. Morgan bristled with team manager Bill Virdon at being taken out in late innings for Rafael Landestoy. Late in the year, Morgan expressed to one reporter his doubt in playing for Virdon again.

Morgan signed onto the San Francisco Giants for the next two seasons. In 1981, Morgan batted .240 and played in just 90 games, his lowest number of games played since 1968. The 1982 season had a bumpy start for the team, but they were neck and neck for second place with the Los Angeles Dodgers (each behind Atlanta) with a three-game set to possibly determine the division race. The Dodgers eliminated San Francisco on the second-to-last day, but Morgan hit a go-ahead three run home run to give the Giants a lead they would not relinquish that saw Los Angeles eliminated in favor of the Braves winning the NL West. Morgan won the 1982 Willie Mac Award for his spirit and leadership. He batted .289 in 134 games the following season for the Giants.

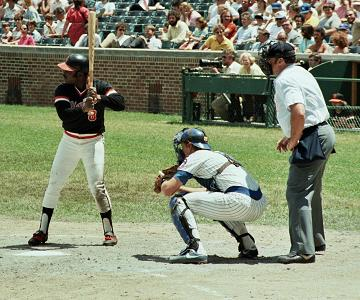
Morgan at bat for the Giants in 1981.

Morgan was acquired along with Al Holland by the Phillies from the Giants for Mike Krukow, Mark Davis and minor-league outfielder C.L. Penigar on December 14, 1982. He was reunited with former Reds teammates Pete Rose and Tony Pérez. The lineup was soon dubbed the "Wheeze Kids", referring to the considerable age in their starting lineup, where just one starting player was under 30 years old. On his 40th birthday in 1983, Morgan had four hits, including two home runs and a double, at Veterans Stadium.

The Phillies beat the Dodgers in the NLCS to reach the World Series for the second time in four seasons. Morgan got to play in the World Series for the final time, facing off against the Baltimore Orioles. In Game 1, he hit a home run in the sixth inning to tie the game; he became the second oldest player to hit a home run in the World Series (Enos Slaughter was a few months older at the age of 40). He went 5-for-19 in the Series, which included a second home run in Game 5, but the Phillies lost in five games. Morgan finished his career with the Oakland Athletics in 1984, playing 116 games and batting .244. He collected a hit in his final game on September 30, collecting a double in his one at-bat before being taken out of the game.

== Post-playing career ==
=== Hall of Fame ===
In 1990, Morgan was elected to the Baseball Hall of Fame with more than 81% of the vote. He entered together with Jim Palmer, both in their first year of eligibility. Morgan and Palmer were the 25th/26th players in MLB history to be elected in their first year of eligibility.

In 2017, Morgan wrote a letter to the Hall of Fame in which he asked that players who had cheated by using performance-enhancing steroids not be elected into the Hall.

=== Legacy ===
Morgan's statue at Great American Ball Park

After his career ended, Morgan was inducted into the Cincinnati Reds Hall of Fame in 1987, and his jersey number 8 was retired. The Reds dedicated a statue for Morgan at Great American Ball Park in 2013. The larger-than-life bronze statue by Tom Tsuchiya shows Morgan as he sprints to steal a base.

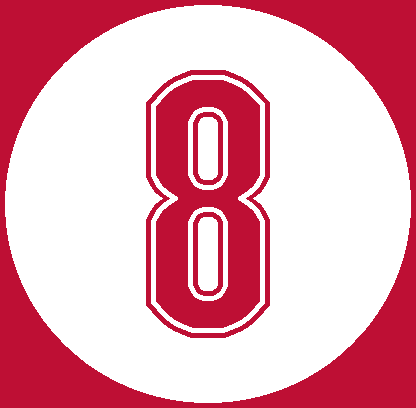
Joe Morgan's number 8 was retired by the Cincinnati Reds in 1987.

In the New Bill James Historical Baseball Abstract, Bill James named Morgan the best second baseman in baseball history, ahead of #2 Eddie Collins and #3 Rogers Hornsby. He also named Morgan as the "greatest percentages player in baseball history", due to his strong fielding percentage, stolen base percentage, walk-to-strikeout ratio, and walks per plate appearance. The statement was included with the caveat that many players in baseball history could not be included in the formula due to lack of data. In the four decades since Morgan's retirement, only one player (Rickey Henderson) has had as many home runs and stolen bases as Morgan did for a career. Morgan had at least 20 home runs and 50 stolen bases in the same season three times during his career, including twice with at least 60 steals.

In 1999, Morgan ranked Number 60 on The Sporting News' list of the 100 Greatest Baseball Players, and was nominated as a finalist for the Major League Baseball All-Century Team.

Morgan served as a member of the board of the Baseball Assistance Team, a 501(c)(3) organization dedicated to helping former Major League, Minor League, and Negro league players through financial and medical hardships. In addition, since 1994, he served on the board of directors for the Baseball Hall of Fame, and was vice-chairman from 2000 until his death in 2020.

== Broadcasting career ==
=== Local gigs and college baseball ===
Morgan started his broadcasting career in 1985 for the Cincinnati Reds. On September 11, 1985, Morgan, along with his television broadcasting partner Ken Wilson, was on hand to call Pete Rose's record-breaking 4,192nd career hit. A year later, Morgan started a nine-year stint as an announcer for the San Francisco Giants. Morgan added one more local gig when he joined the Oakland Athletics' broadcasting team for the 1995 season.

In 1986, ESPN hired Morgan to call Monday Night Baseball and College World Series games.

=== ABC Sports ===
From 1988 to 1989, Morgan served as an announcer for ABC, where he helped announce Monday Night and Thursday Night Baseball games (providing backup for the led announcing crew composed of Al Michaels, Tim McCarver, and Jim Palmer), the 1988 American League Championship Series with Gary Bender and Reggie Jackson, and served as a field reporter for the 1989 World Series along with Gary Thorne (Morgan's regular season partner in 1989). Morgan was on the field at San Francisco's Candlestick Park alongside Hall of Famer Willie Mays (whom Morgan was getting set to interview) the moment the Loma Prieta earthquake hit.

=== NBC Sports ===
From 1994 to 2000, Morgan teamed with Bob Costas and Bob Uecker (until 1997) to call baseball games on NBC (and in association with The Baseball Network from 1994 to 1995). During this period, Morgan helped call three World Series (1995, 1997, and 1999) and four All-Star Games (1994, 1996, 1998, and 2000). Morgan also called three American League Championship Series (1996, 1998, and 2000) and three National League Championship Series (1995 alongside Greg Gumbel, 1997, and 1999).

Morgan spent a previous stint (1986–1987) with NBC calling regional Game of the Week telecasts alongside Bob Carpenter. During NBC's coverage of the 1985 and 1987 National League Championship Series, Morgan served as a pregame analyst alongside hosts Dick Enberg (in 1985) and Marv Albert (in 1987).

=== ESPN ===
Morgan in the Baseball Hall of Fame parade in 2011.

Morgan was a member of ESPN's lead baseball broadcast team alongside Jon Miller and Orel Hershiser. Besides teaming with Miller for Sunday Night Baseball (since its inception in 1990) telecasts, Morgan also teamed with Miller for League Championship Series and World Series broadcasts on ESPN Radio.

In 1999, Morgan teamed with his then-NBC colleague Bob Costas to call two weekday night telecasts for ESPN. The first was on Wednesday, August 25 with Detroit Tigers playing against the Seattle Mariners. The second was on Tuesday, September 21 with the Atlanta Braves playing against the New York Mets. He won two Sports Emmy Awards for Outstanding Sports Event Analyst in 1998 and 2005.

In 2006, he called the Little League World Series Championship with Brent Musburger and Orel Hershiser on ABC, replacing the recently fired Harold Reynolds. During the 2006 MLB playoffs, the network had Morgan pull double duty by calling the first half of the Mets–Dodgers playoff game at Shea Stadium before traveling across town to call the Yankees–Tigers night game at Yankee Stadium.

In 2009, Sports Illustrated's Joe Posnanski spoke about the perceived disparity between Morgan's celebrated playing style and his on-air persona:

"The disconnect between Morgan the player and Morgan the announcer is one that I'm just not sure anyone has figured. Bill James tells a great story about how one time Jon Miller showed Morgan Bill's New Historical Baseball Abstract, which has Morgan ranked as the best second baseman of all time, ahead of Rogers Hornsby. Well, Morgan starts griping that this was ridiculous, that Hornsby hit .358 in his career, and Morgan never hit .358, and so on. And there it was, perfectly aligned—Joe Morgan the announcer arguing against Joe Morgan the player."

In the wake of Morgan taking an official role with the Cincinnati Reds as a "special adviser to baseball operations", it was announced on November 8, 2010, that Morgan would not be returning for the 2011 season as an announcer on ESPN Sunday Night Baseball. His former broadcast partner Jon Miller's contract expired in 2010 and ESPN chose not to renew his contract. Morgan and Miller were replaced by Bobby Valentine and Dan Shulman, respectively (while ESPN retained Orel Hershiser, who joined the Sunday Night Baseball telecasts in 2010).

=== Other appearances ===
Morgan was also a broadcaster in the MLB 2K video game series from 2K Sports.

It was announced on June 17, 2011, that Morgan would begin a daily, one-hour general-sports-talk radio program on Sports USA Radio Network, beginning on August 22 of that year.

=== Return to the Reds ===
In April 2010, Morgan returned to the Reds as an advisor to baseball operations, including community outreach for the Reds.

== Personal life ==
Morgan married Gloria Stewart, his high school girlfriend, on April 3, 1967. They had two children, and divorced in the 1980s. He then married Theresa Behymer in 1990. They had twins in 1991.

In March 1988, while transiting through Los Angeles International Airport, Morgan was violently thrown to the floor, handcuffed, and arrested by Los Angeles Police Department (LAPD) detectives who profiled him as a drug courier. He filed and won a civil rights case against the LAPD in 1991, and was awarded $540,000. In 1993, a federal court upheld his claim that his civil rights had been violated.

In 2015, Morgan was diagnosed with Myelodysplastic syndrome, which developed into leukemia. He received a bone marrow transplant from one of his daughters. Morgan died on October 11, 2020, at the age of 77, at his home in Danville, California. He suffered from a non-specified polyneuropathy in the time leading up to his death. Behymer-Morgan survives him.

== See also ==
- Bay Area Sports Hall of Fame
- Houston Astros award winners and league leaders
- List of Gold Glove middle infield duos
- List of Major League Baseball annual runs scored leaders
- List of Major League Baseball annual triples leaders
- List of Major League Baseball career doubles leaders
- List of Major League Baseball career hits leaders
- List of Major League Baseball career home run leaders
- List of Major League Baseball career runs batted in leaders
- List of Major League Baseball career runs scored leaders
- List of Major League Baseball career stolen bases leaders
- List of Major League Baseball career total bases leaders
- List of Major League Baseball single-game hits leaders

Preceded by Lou Brock; Bob Watson; George Foster	National League Player of the Month; April 1975; June 1975; August 1976	Succeeded by Bob Watson; Dave Kingman; Steve Garvey
Preceded by Tom Seaver	Lead color commentator, Major League Baseball on NBC; 1994–2000 (with Bob Uecker from 1994–1997)	Succeeded by Last
Preceded by First	Lead color commentator, Sunday Night Baseball; 1990–2010 (with Steve Phillips in 2009 and Orel Hershiser in 2010)	Succeeded by Orel Hershiser and Bobby Valentine
Preceded by Jeff Torborg	World Series network radio color commentator 1998; 2001-2010	Succeeded by Rick Sutcliffe; Orel Hershiser and Bobby Valentine
