= Eric Yelding =

American baseball player (born 1965)

- Shortstop / Center fielder
- Born: February 22, 1965 (age 61); Montrose, Alabama, U.S.
- Batted: Right Threw: Right

MLB debut
- April 9, 1989, for the Houston Astros

Last MLB appearance
- October 3, 1993, for the Chicago Cubs

MLB statistics
- Batting average: .244
- Home runs: 3
- Runs batted in: 67
- Stats at Baseball Reference

Teams
- Houston Astros (1989–1992); Chicago Cubs (1993)

Eric Girard Yelding (born February 22, 1965) is an American former professional baseball player. He played all or parts of five seasons in Major League Baseball with the Houston Astros and Chicago Cubs from 1989-93. Known for his blazing speed and strong arm, he played several different positions, most often at shortstop and in center field.

== Minor leagues ==
Yelding was a star athlete at Fairhope High School in Fairhope, Alabama, and was later drafted in the 1st round of the 1984 MLB amateur draft out of Chipola College by the Toronto Blue Jays. He made an immediate impact with his speed and arm, stealing 93 bases and adding 19 outfield assists in his first 200 games with the Medicine Hat Blue Jays and Kinston Blue Jays.

Because of his strong arm, he was moved to shortstop the following season with the Ventura County Gulls. Although he found success with the bat and on the basepaths, hitting .280 with 41 steals, he made 58 fielding errors. He divided the 1987 year between the Myrtle Beach Blue Jays and Double-A Knoxville Blue Jays, where he stole a combined 83 bases, though his fielding did not improve as he made another 59 errors.

Despite being a liability in the infield, his prowess on the basepaths earned him a promotion to the AAA Syracuse Chiefs where he was moved to second base in an attempt to alleviate his fielding woes. Although his play in the field was still suspect, he did cut his season error total to 35 while hitting .250 and stealing 59 bases for the Chiefs.

== Major leagues ==
=== Houston Astros ===
On December 5, 1988, Yelding was selected by the Chicago Cubs from Toronto in the Rule 5 draft. He was waived by the Cubs and selected off waivers by the Houston Astros the following April. In order to satisfy the Rule 5 terms, the Astros were mandated to either keep Yelding on the major league club for the entire season or forfeit their rights to him. Faced with the dilemma of having a player not yet ready for everyday play on their roster, but not wanting to lose their rights to what they considered a future star, the Astros used Yelding primarily as a pinch hitter and pinch runner. He appeared in 70 games, but played the field in only 38 of them and recorded just 102 plate appearances.

The Astros' patience with Yelding paid early dividends, as he became their full-time leadoff hitter in 1990 and finished second in the National League with 64 stolen bases. Though he improved and even showed flashes of brilliance in the field, his defense was still subpar though he did show his versatility by appearing at second base, third base, shortstop, and in the outfield.

Unfortunately, 1990 would be his last full season in the major leagues. He missed half of 1991 due to injury and struggled when healthy. He had only 8 at-bats for the Astros in 1992, spending most of the season with the AAA Tucson Toros. On July 10, 1992, he was traded to the Chicago White Sox in exchange for Rich Scheid. He finished the 1992 season with the Vancouver Canadians before being released by the White Sox at the end of the season. He was signed by the Cincinnati Reds during the winter, but released during spring training in 1993 before being signed for the second time by the Chicago Cubs.

=== Chicago Cubs ===
Yelding was used by the Cubs primarily as a utility infielder and pinch hitter/runner. Although his fielding had greatly improved since his early days with the Astros (with two errors in 32 games at second base in 1993), he struggled with the bat, hitting .204. He missed a large part of the 1993 season due to injury, as well as the following year, in which he appeared in 29 games with the Iowa Cubs.

He never appeared in another major league baseball game, although he did play in spring training as a replacement player for the Cleveland Indians during the 1994 Major League Baseball strike. Yelding spent 1995 and 1996 in the Indians and Seattle Mariners minor league systems between stints in independent leagues. He made one final comeback attempt in 1999, playing for two independent teams, before retiring for good.
