= Glenn Davis (baseball) =

American baseball player (born 1961)

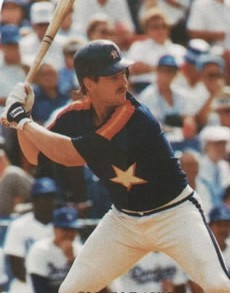
- First baseman
- Born: March 28, 1961 (age 65); Jacksonville, Florida, U.S.
- Batted: Right Threw: Right

Professional debut
- MLB: September 2, 1984, for the Houston Astros
- NPB: April 7, 1995, for the Hanshin Tigers

Last appearance
- MLB: May 23, 1993, for the Baltimore Orioles
- NPB: June 9, 1996, for the Hanshin Tigers

MLB statistics
- Batting average: .259
- Home runs: 190
- Runs batted in: 603

NPB statistics
- Batting average: .252
- Home runs: 28
- Runs batted in: 95
- Stats at Baseball Reference

Teams
- Houston Astros (1984–1990); Baltimore Orioles (1991–1993); Hanshin Tigers (1995–1996)

Career highlights and awards
- 2× All-Star (1986, 1989); Silver Slugger Award (1986)

Glenn Earl Davis (born March 28, 1961) is an American former Major League Baseball (MLB) first baseman who played for the Houston Astros and Baltimore Orioles from 1984 to 1993 and finished in the top ten in National League MVP balloting three times (1986, 1988 and 1989).

== Early life ==
Davis' parents divorced when he was six years old, with his father leaving entirely when Davis was 7. While attending University Christian School in Jacksonville, Florida, the school's athletic director, George Davis, took an interest in Glenn. While they are not related to Glenn, he and his wife, Norma, practically adopted him, and they are the biological parents of former major league pitcher Storm Davis. Though they are not related, Glenn and Storm have long considered themselves brothers. At University Christian, Glenn and Storm led the Christians to back-to-back state titles (1978–79).

Both were drafted in the 1979 Major League Baseball draft by the Baltimore Orioles upon graduation from University Christian High School (Storm seventh round, Glenn 31st). While Storm chose to sign with the Orioles, Glenn accepted a baseball scholarship and played one season at the University of Georgia and then transferred to Manatee Junior College to make himself eligible sooner for the MLB draft. In 1980, Davis played collegiate summer baseball with the Chatham A's of the Cape Cod Baseball League (CCBL) where he was named a league all-star. He was named to the CCBL Hall of Fame in 2023. The Houston Astros selected Davis in the first round of the draft's secondary phase in 1981 and signed him for $50,000.

== Houston Astros ==
Davis developed into one of the top power-hitting prospects in the Astros' farm system, hitting 71 home runs before receiving his first call up to the majors in September 1984. In his first full season, 1985, Davis batted .271 with 20 home runs and 64 runs batted in to finish fifth in National League rookie of the year balloting. In Houston, he earned his nickname, "The Big Bopper".

Davis had a break-out season in 1986. He had 60 RBIs and 20 home runs at the All-Star break to make his first All-Star team. For the season, he clubbed 31 home runs and had 101 RBIs with a .265 batting average to win the Silver Slugger Award at first base, and finish second to the Philadelphia Phillies' Mike Schmidt in NL MVP voting.

The Astros handily won the National League West by ten games over the Cincinnati Reds to face the New York Mets in the 1986 National League Championship Series. The only scoring in the game one pitchers' duel between Mike Scott and Dwight Gooden was a solo home run by Davis in the second inning, which he hit in his first ever postseason at-bat. From there, Mets pitching would contain Davis until the classic game six extra-innings marathon. Davis went three-for-seven with a run scored and two RBIs, including the final run of the game as the Astros attempted to come back from a 7–4 deficit in the 16th inning, although they would wind up losing the game and series. It would be his only postseason experience, and he had seven total hits in the series.

Davis remained one of the top sluggers in the NL through 1989, earning a second All-Star selection in 1989, and finishing in the top ten in MVP voting in 1988 and 1989. In the 1990 season opener, Cincinnati Reds pitchers hit Davis with pitches in three of his six plate appearances. He hit three home runs in a loss to the San Francisco Giants on June 1. However, a rib injury caused Davis to miss the entire month of July and limited him to just 93 games all season. Despite his limited time on the field, Davis hit 22 home runs and drove in 64. In 1989, he became the first Astro to hit at least 20 home runs in five consecutive seasons. Davis still ranks ninth all-time in Astros career home run leaders.

In the offseason, he was part of what many consider to be the worst trade in Baltimore Orioles history when he was traded to the Orioles for three future All-Stars, Steve Finley, Pete Harnisch and Curt Schilling. After the trade Davis signed a then club record $3.275 million, one-year contract with the Orioles.

== Baltimore Orioles ==
Davis suffered a nerve injury in his neck during his first spring training with the Orioles on a swing that he felt two pops in immediately. He tried to play through the injury, which resulted in neck spasms on his right side. The injury he was found to have suffered was damage to his spinal accessory nerve. He was batting .244 with four home runs and eight RBIs through April 24, 1991 when this injury landed him on the disabled list, and kept him from the Orioles' line-up through the middle of August. Davis ended the season with 10 home runs, 28 RBIs and a .227 average in 49 games. In 1992, Davis hit for a .276 batting average, 13 home runs, and 48 RBIs in 106 games.

Splitting time fairly evenly between first base and designated hitter, Davis was batting just .177 with one home run and nine RBIs through May when his jaw was broken in a bar fight. After a brief stint with the Triple-A Rochester Red Wings, Davis's return to action was delayed when, while he was sitting in the dugout during an Orioles game on August 1, he was hit in the head by a line drive foul ball of the bat of teammate Jeffrey Hammonds. He was finally reactivated on September 6, but, following an argument with Orioles manager Johnny Oates about being left out of the starting line-up against left-handed pitcher Dave Fleming, was released by the club two days later on September 8 without playing another game. Glenn Davis holds the record of most home runs in career history (190) without ever hitting a grand slam.

== Later career ==
Davis joined the New York Mets for spring training 1994, but did not make the club. He later joined the Omaha Royals where he produced a batting average of .282 with 27 home runs and 97 RBI but was not given another opportunity to play in the Majors. From 1995 to 1996 Glenn played for the Hanshin Tigers in Japan. He came back to the US and spent the end of the 1996 season playing for St. Paul Saints in the Northern League before retiring from baseball.

== Personal life ==
Davis founded The Carpenter's Way home for disadvantaged children in Columbus, Georgia, and in 2008 he and his wife helped start the Arebella Home for girls. He currently serves as an elected city councilman for the city of Columbus and owns the Hilton Garden Inn and Homewood Suites hotels located in Columbus, Georgia.

== See also ==
- Houston Astros award winners and league leaders

Awards and achievements
Preceded by Alvin Davis	Topps Rookie All-Star first baseman 1985	Succeeded by Wally Joyner
