= Jeff Baldwin =

American baseball player (born 1965)

- Pinch hitter/Outfielder
- Born: September 5, 1965 (age 61); Milford, Delaware, U.S.
- Batted: Left Threw: Left

MLB debut
- May 22, 1990, for the Houston Astros

Last MLB appearance
- June 4, 1990, for the Houston Astros

MLB statistics
- Games: 7
- At bats: 8
- Hits: 0
- Stats at Baseball Reference

Teams
- Houston Astros (1990)

Jeffrey Allen Baldwin (born September 5, 1965) is an American former Major League Baseball player. Baldwin played in seven games for the Houston Astros in the 1990 season. He had no hits in eight at-bats, in seven games. He also had one walk. Baldwin was later a replacement player for the Astros during the 1995 pre-season, but did not appear in another regular season MLB game as the strike was resolved and the start of the season was delayed.

Raised in Washington Township, Gloucester County, New Jersey, Baldwin graduated in 1983 from Washington Township High School.

He was drafted by the Astros in the 14th round of the 1985 amateur draft.
