= 1990 Baseball Hall of Fame balloting =

Elections to the Baseball Hall of Fame

National Baseball

Hall of Fame and Museum
- New inductees: 2
- via BBWAA: 2
- Total inductees: 206
- Induction date: August 6, 1990

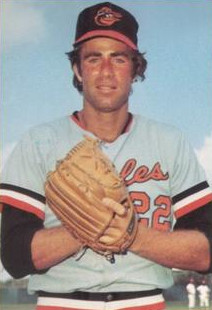
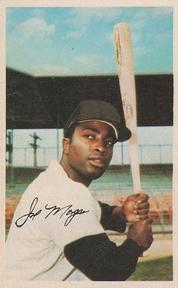
1990 inductees Jim Palmer (left) and Joe Morgan

Elections to the Baseball Hall of Fame for 1990 followed the system in place since 1978. The Baseball Writers' Association of America (BBWAA) voted by mail to select from recent major league players and elected two, Joe Morgan and Jim Palmer. The Veterans Committee met in closed sessions to consider older major league players as well as managers, umpires, executives, and figures from the Negro leagues. It selected no one. A formal induction ceremony was held in Cooperstown, New York, on August 6, 1990; after being delayed a day due to rain, it was held indoors due to continued bad weather.

== BBWAA election ==
The BBWAA was authorized to elect players active in 1970 or later, but not after 1984; the ballot included candidates from the 1989 ballot who received at least 5% of the vote but were not elected, along with selected players, chosen by a screening committee, whose last appearance was in 1984. All 10-year members of the BBWAA were eligible to vote.

Voters were instructed to cast votes for up to 10 candidates; any candidate receiving votes on at least 75% of the ballots would be honored with induction to the Hall. Results of the 1990 election by the BBWAA were announced on January 9. The ballot consisted of 44 players; a total of 444 ballots were cast, with 333 votes required for election. A total of 3,050 individual votes were cast, an average of 6.87 per ballot. Those candidates receiving less than 5% of the vote will not appear on future BBWAA ballots, but may eventually be considered by the Veterans Committee.

Candidates who were eligible for the first time are indicated here with a dagger (†). The two candidates who received at least 75% of the vote and was elected is indicated in bold italics; candidates who have since been elected in subsequent elections are indicated in italics. The 20 candidates who received less than 5% of the vote, thus becoming ineligible for future BBWAA consideration, are indicated with an asterisk (*).

Roy Face was on the ballot for the 15th and final time.

Player	Votes	Percent	Change	Year
**Jim Palmer**†	411	92.6	-	1st
**Joe Morgan**†	363	81.8	-	1st
Gaylord Perry	320	72.1	▲4.1%	2nd
Fergie Jenkins	296	66.7	▲3.4%	2nd
Jim Bunning	257	57.9	▼5.4%	14th
Orlando Cepeda	211	47.5	▲8.1%	11th
Tony Oliva	142	32.0	▲1.8%	9th
Bill Mazeroski	131	29.5	▼0.5%	13th
Harvey Kuenn	107	24.1	▼1.6%	14th
Ron Santo	96	21.6	▲4.8%	7th
Maury Wills	95	21.4	▲0.1%	13th
Jim Kaat	79	17.8	▼1.7%	2nd
Ken Boyer	78	17.6	▲3.7%	11th
Dick Allen	58	13.1	▲5.3%	8th
Joe Torre	55	12.4	▲3.5%	8th
Minnie Miñoso	51	11.5	▼1.7%	6th
Roy Face	50	11.3	▲0.8%	15th
Luis Tiant	42	9.5	▼1.0%	3rd
Vada Pinson	36	8.1	▲0.3%	9th
Curt Flood	35	7.9	▲1.9%	9th
Thurman Munson	33	7.4	▼0.5%	10th
Bobby Bonds	30	6.8	▲0.3%	4th
Mickey Lolich	27	6.1	▼4.4%	6th
Sparky Lyle	25	5.6	-	3rd
Tug McGraw†*	6	1.4	-	1st
Bucky Dent†*	3	0.7	-	1st
Bob Watson†*	3	0.7	-	1st
Rick Monday†*	2	0.5	-	1st
Lou Piniella†*	2	0.5	-	1st
Mickey Rivers†*	2	0.5	-	1st
Jim Bibby†*	1	0.2	-	1st
Greg Luzinski†*	1	0.2	-	1st
Jerry Remy†*	1	0.2	-	1st
Mike Torrez†*	1	0.2	-	1st
Mike Caldwell†*	0	0.0	-	1st
Roy Howell†*	0	0.0	-	1st
Jose Morales†*	0	0.0	-	1st
Amos Otis†*	0	0.0	-	1st
Tony Scott†*	0	0.0	-	1st
Ken Singleton†*	0	0.0	-	1st
Paul Splittorff†*	0	0.0	-	1st
John Stearns†*	0	0.0	-	1st
Champ Summers†*	0	0.0	-	1st
Dick Tidrow†*	0	0.0	-	1st

Key to colors
Elected to the Hall. These individuals are also indicated in **bold italics**.
Players who were elected in future elections. These individuals are also indicated in plain italics.
Players not yet elected who returned on the 1991 ballot.
Eliminated from future BBWAA voting. These individuals remain eligible for future Veterans Committee consideration.

The newly eligible candidates included 19 All-Stars, four of whom were not on the ballot, who were selected a total of 50 times. The field included 10-time All-Star Joe Morgan, 6-time All-Star Jim Palmer, and 5-time All-Star Amos Otis. The group of new candidates include one MVP (Morgan, who won twice), one Cy Young Award winner (Palmer, who won thrice), and one Rookie of the Year (Lou Piniella).

Players eligible for the first time who were not on the ballot were: Glenn Abbott, Jerry Augustine, Tom Burgmeier, John Curtis, Jim Essian, Pete Falcone, Ron Hodges, Ron Jackson, Frank LaCorte, Jerry Martin, Milt May, Larry Milbourne, Sid Monge, Biff Pocoroba, Ron Reed, Leon Roberts, Craig Swan, Tom Underwood, Mike Vail, and Tom Veryzer.

== J. G. Taylor Spink Award ==
Jerome Holtzman (1926–2008) received the J. G. Taylor Spink Award honoring a baseball writer. The award was voted at the December 1989 meeting of the BBWAA, and included in the summer 1990 ceremonies.
