= Randy Hennis =

American baseball player (born 1965)

- Pitcher
- Born: December 16, 1965 (age 60); Clearlake, California, U.S.
- Batted: Right Threw: Right

MLB debut
- September 17, 1990, for the Houston Astros

Last MLB appearance
- October 3, 1990, for the Houston Astros

MLB statistics
- Games pitched: 3
- Earned run average: 0.00
- Strikeouts: 4
- Stats at Baseball Reference

Teams
- Houston Astros (1990)

Randall Philip Hennis (born December 16, 1965) is an American former professional baseball pitcher. Hennis played in three games for the Houston Astros of Major League Baseball in 1990.

Hennis attended UCLA, and in 1986 he played collegiate summer baseball with the Harwich Mariners of the Cape Cod Baseball League. He was selected by the Astros in the 2nd round of the 1987 MLB draft.
