= Louie Meadows =

American baseball player (born 1961)

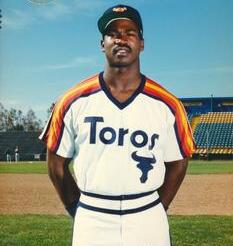
- Meadows with the Tucson Toros c. 1987
- Left Fielder / First baseman
- Born: April 29, 1961 (age 65); Maysville, North Carolina, U.S.
- Batted: Left Threw: Left

MLB debut
- July 3, 1986, for the Houston Astros

Last MLB appearance
- October 3, 1990, for the Philadelphia Phillies

MLB statistics
- Batting average: .173
- Home runs: 5
- Runs batted in: 13
- Stats at Baseball Reference

Teams
- Houston Astros (1986–1990); Philadelphia Phillies (1990)

Michael Ray "Louie" Meadows (born April 29, 1961) is a retired American Major League Baseball left fielder.

Meadows attended White Oak High School in Jacksonville, North Carolina. He helped lead the White Oak baseball team to back-to-back North Carolina 3A state titles in 1978 and 1979, where they went undefeated both years. Meadows was also named the nation's player of the year in 1979.

He attended North Carolina State University, where he played baseball for the Wolfpack.

Drafted by the Houston Astros in the 2nd round (43rd overall pick) of the 1982 MLB amateur draft, Meadows made his Major League Baseball debut with the Houston Astros on July 3, 1986. He signed with the Philadelphia Phillies as a free agent on July 4, 1990, and appeared in his final game on October 3, 1990. He had 127 career at bats in 102 games. He had a .173 lifetime batting average. He batted and threw left-handed.
