= Javier Ortiz (outfielder) =

American baseball player (born 1963)

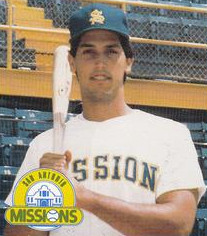
- Ortiz in 1988
- Outfielder
- Born: January 22, 1963 (age 63); Boston, Massachusetts, U.S.
- Batted: Right Threw: Right

MLB debut
- June 15, 1990, for the Houston Astros

Last MLB appearance
- October 6, 1991, for the Houston Astros

MLB statistics
- Batting average: .275
- Home runs: 2
- Runs batted in: 15
- Stats at Baseball Reference

Teams
- Houston Astros (1990–1991)

Javier Victor Ortiz (born January 22, 1963) is an American former Major League Baseball outfielder. He played during two seasons at the major league level for the Houston Astros. He was drafted by the Texas Rangers in the 1st round (4th pick) of the 1983 amateur draft. Ortiz played his first professional season with their Class A Burlington Rangers in 1983, and his last season with the Chicago White Sox's Triple-A affiliate, the Nashville Sounds, in 1995.
