= 1986 National League Championship Series =

18th edition of Major League Baseball's National League Championship Series

Team (Wins)	Managers	Season
New York Mets (4)	Davey Johnson	108–54, .667, GA: 21½
Houston Astros (2)	Hal Lanier	96–66, .593, GA: 10
- Dates: October 8–15
- MVP: Mike Scott (Houston)
- Umpires: Doug Harvey (crew chief); Lee Weyer; Frank Pulli; Dutch Rennert; Joe West; Fred Brocklander

Broadcast
- Television: ABC
- TV announcers: Keith Jackson and Tim McCarver
- Radio: CBS; WHN (NYM); KTRH (HOU)
- Radio announcers: CBS: Brent Musburger and Johnny Bench; WHN: Bob Murphy and Gary Thorne; KTRH: Gene Elston, Milo Hamilton, Larry Dierker, Bill Worrell, Jerry Trupiano

The 1986 National League Championship Series was a best-of-seven postseason series in Major League Baseball’s 1986 postseason between the NL East champion New York Mets and NL West champion Houston Astros. It was the 18th NLCS and the first MLB playoff series in which the opponents were two "expansion" teams that had begun play in the same season (1962). The series was won by the Mets, four games to two, culminating with their 7–6, 16-inning triumph at the Astrodome in Game 6. New York then defeated the Boston Red Sox in the 1986 World Series, four games to three.

== Background ==
After falling short of the NL East title in 1984 and 1985, the Mets, managed by Davey Johnson, captured first place in 1986 by posting a 108–54 record, 21 1/2 games ahead of the second-place rival Philadelphia Phillies. The title was the third in Mets' history and first since winning the 1973 NL pennant.

Meanwhile, Houston recorded a mark of 96–66 to capture the NL West title, clinching the crown when staff ace Mike Scott threw a no-hitter against the San Francisco Giants, marking the first time any team had clinched a division championship with a no-hitter. It was also the first time the Astros had won a division in six seasons. Houston was managed by Hal Lanier. Heading the Astros rotation were two former New York Mets, Mike Scott and Nolan Ryan; Scott, Ryan, and Bob Knepper were utilized by Lanier as his starting pitchers, which meant that late season acquisition Danny Darwin would be saved up for a World Series start.

The Mets won seven of their 12 regular-season contests against the Astros, taking five of six at home and losing four of six in Houston, including a three-game sweep in July during which New York's Bob Ojeda, Ron Darling, Tim Teufel, and Rick Aguilera were arrested for a scuffle with off-duty cops working as bouncers. Home field advantage, from 1969 to 1993, alternated between division winners, regardless of record. The Mets were to have home field advantage for this series, as the Dodgers (the 1985 NL West Champions) had it the previous year, however, a regular season NFL game between the Chicago Bears and Houston Oilers made the Astrodome unavailable for October 12. Consequently, Games 1, 2, 6, and 7, were scheduled for the Astrodome to avoid conflicts (Shea Stadium became a baseball-only facility when the New York Jets left for Giants Stadium in New Jersey after their 1983 season). The East would host the following LCS in 1987.

Both franchises came into the league together in 1962. The Astros held an 111–59 lifetime record against the Mets in Houston, which was a topic of debate leading into the NLCS considering the Astros held home-field advantage.

== Summary ==
=== Houston Astros vs. New York Mets ===
New York won the series, 4–2.

Game	Date	Score	Location	Time	Attendance
1	October 8	New York Mets – 0, Houston Astros – 1	Astrodome	2:56	44,131
2	October 9	New York Mets – 5, Houston Astros – 1	Astrodome	2:40	44,391
3	October 11	Houston Astros – 5, New York Mets – 6	Shea Stadium	2:55	55,052
4	October 12	Houston Astros – 3, New York Mets – 1	Shea Stadium	2:23	55,038
5	October 14	Houston Astros – 1, New York Mets – 2 (12)	Shea Stadium	3:45	54,986
6	October 15	New York Mets – 7, Houston Astros – 6 (16)	Astrodome	4:42	45,718

== Game summaries ==
=== Game 1 ===
Wednesday, October 8, 1986 7:25 pm (CT) at Astrodome in Houston, Texas 73 °F (23 °C), dome
Team	1	2	3	4	5	6	7	8	9	R	H	E
New York	0	0	0	0	0	0	0	0	0	0	5	0
Houston	0	1	0	0	0	0	0	0	X	1	7	1
WP: Mike Scott (1–0) LP: Dwight Gooden (0–1); Home runs: NYM: None; HOU: Glenn Davis (1)

Game 1 featured a pitching duel between eventual NLCS Most Valuable Player Mike Scott and Mets ace Dwight Gooden. Scott allowed just five hits and walked one while striking out 14 in a complete-game effort as the host Astros prevailed 1–0. Gooden allowed one run in his seven innings, getting Scott to ground into a double play to end an Astros threat in the bottom of the fourth inning.

Houston first baseman Glenn Davis hit a long home run leading off the second inning, producing the game's lone run. Scott struck out Wally Backman and Keith Hernandez to escape a jam in the top of the eighth inning. With one out in the top of the ninth inning, Darryl Strawberry singled, stole second and reached third on a Mookie Wilson groundout. However, Scott struck out Ray Knight to end the game.

=== Game 2 ===
Thursday, October 9, 1986 7:20 pm (CT) at Astrodome in Houston, Texas 73 °F (23 °C), dome
Team	1	2	3	4	5	6	7	8	9	R	H	E
New York	0	0	0	2	3	0	0	0	0	5	10	0
Houston	0	0	0	0	0	0	1	0	0	1	10	2
WP: Bob Ojeda (1–0) LP: Nolan Ryan (0–1)

Game 2 saw the Mets tie the series at one game apiece as New York scored two runs in the fourth inning and then got three more in the fifth innings against Astros' starter Nolan Ryan en route to a 5–1 victory.

Lefty Bob Ojeda went for a complete game on a ten-hitter for the Mets, who were aided by an RBI double by Gary Carter and a sacrifice fly by Darryl Strawberry in the fourth inning. Wally Backman and Keith Hernandez combined for three RBIs in the fifth inning. The only Astros run came on a Phil Garner single in the seventh inning.

=== Game 3 ===
Saturday, October 11, 1986 12:10 pm (ET) at Shea Stadium in Queens, New York 55 °F (13 °C), overcast
Team	1	2	3	4	5	6	7	8	9	R	H	E
Houston	2	2	0	0	0	0	1	0	0	5	8	1
New York	0	0	0	0	0	4	0	0	2	6	10	1
WP: Jesse Orosco (1–0) LP: Dave Smith (0–1); Home runs: HOU: Bill Doran (1); NYM: Darryl Strawberry (1), Lenny Dykstra (1)

Game 3 was a back-and-forth contest won by the Mets when Lenny Dykstra hit a two-run, walk-off homer against Astros' reliever Dave Smith in the bottom of the ninth inning, giving New York a 6–5 victory and 2–1 series lead on a Saturday afternoon at Shea Stadium.

Houston broke through with four runs in the first two innings against Mets' starter Ron Darling, highlighted by Bill Doran's two-run home run in the second.

Darling then threw three scoreless innings and the Mets came back by scoring four runs in the bottom of the sixth innings as Darryl Strawberry's three-run homer off Houston starter Bob Knepper tied the game 4–4. Years later, Strawberry said that part of the credit for the home run came from Keith Hernandez, who was on second base during the at-bat, and that Hernandez signaled to Strawberry that Knepper was going to try to pitch him inside and to keep his right shoulder (the shoulder facing the pitcher) down when swinging at the inside pitches, which led to the home run.

However, the Astros struck back against reliever Rick Aguilera in the top of the seventh as a throwing error by Ray Knight led to an unearned run that came home when Denny Walling's fielder's choice scored Doran for a 5–4 lead. Knight's gaffe was the only error committed by the Mets in the series.

With the Astros still leading in the bottom of the ninth, closer Smith allowed a lead-off bunt single to Wally Backman. The Astros argued afterward that Backman ran out of the baseline running to first while trying to avoid a tag from Smith. However, the umpire declared that Backman stayed close enough to the basepath while trying to avoid the tag that it was allowed. Backman advanced to second on a passed ball, and Danny Heep then flew out to center field for the inning's first out. The next batter was Dykstra, who won it for New York by lacing a Smith pitch over the right-field fence for a two-run homer. Dykstra's homer was the first come-from-behind, walk-off home run in postseason history.

Jesse Orosco won the game in relief for New York by working two scoreless innings.

=== Game 4 ===
Sunday, October 12, 1986 8:20 pm (ET) at Shea Stadium in Queens, New York 57 °F (14 °C), overcast
Team	1	2	3	4	5	6	7	8	9	R	H	E
Houston	0	2	0	0	1	0	0	0	0	3	4	1
New York	0	0	0	0	0	0	0	1	0	1	3	0
WP: Mike Scott (2–0) LP: Sid Fernandez (0–1); Home runs: HOU: Alan Ashby (1), Dickie Thon (1); NYM: None

Astros' ace Mike Scott, pitching on three days rest, was dominant once again in Game 4. The right-hander again pitched a complete game on a three-hitter to earn his second victory of the series in Houston's 3–1 triumph.

Mets' starter Sid Fernandez allowed just three runs in six innings, but surrendered a two-run home run to Alan Ashby and a laser-beam home run to Dickie Thon to account for all the offense the Astros needed.

Danny Heep drove in Mookie Wilson with a sacrifice fly in the eighth to account for the Mets' only run. Gary Carter came to bat as the tying run in the bottom of the ninth, but flied out to center as the Astros tied the series 2–2.

=== Game 5 ===
Tuesday, October 14, 1986 1:05 pm (ET) at Shea Stadium in Queens, New York 64 °F (18 °C), drizzle
Team	1	2	3	4	5	6	7	8	9	10	11	12	R	H	E
Houston	0	0	0	0	1	0	0	0	0	0	0	0	1	9	1
New York	0	0	0	0	1	0	0	0	0	0	0	1	2	4	0
WP: Jesse Orosco (2–0) LP: Charlie Kerfeld (0–1); Home runs: HOU: None; NYM: Darryl Strawberry (2)

After rain postponed Game 5 to a noon start on October 14, the Mets took a 3–2 series lead as Gary Carter's single off Charlie Kerfeld in the bottom of the 12th inning scored Wally Backman with the winning run for a 2–1 victory.

Game 5 was a pitchers' duel between Dwight Gooden and Nolan Ryan as Gooden allowed just one run in 10 innings with Ryan also surrendering a single run on two hits while striking out 12 in nine innings.

With no score in the top of the second, Gooden surrendered consecutive singles to Kevin Bass and José Cruz, putting runners on the corners with nobody out. He then struck out Alan Ashby on a full count, and induced Craig Reynolds to ground into a double play to escape the jam. Replays showed that Reynolds appeared to beat out the play at first base, but he was called out by umpire Fred Brocklander, negating a potential run from Kevin Bass that would have given the Astros a 1–0 lead.

The Astros eventually did take a 1–0 lead in the fifth when Ashby doubled, took third on a single by Reynolds, and then scored on Bill Doran's ground-out. However, the Mets came right back and tied it in the bottom half when Darryl Strawberry smashed a homer for the Mets' first hit of the game and his second bomb of the series.

The Astros had a runner reach second base in the eighth and tenth innings. However, in the eighth, with one out, Gooden got Denny Walling to fly out to Mookie Wilson in left field, where Wilson doubled off Doran from second base to end the inning. In the 10th inning, with two out, Gooden gave up a single to pinch hitter Terry Puhl, who then stole second base, and walked Doran. He got Billy Hatcher to fly out to right field to end the inning with no damage done.

The game stayed tied until the 12th when with one out Backman got an infield single off Kerfeld. Backman then took second on Kerfeld's errant throw on a pick-off attempt. Houston manager Lanier opted to intentionally walk Hernandez and pitch to Carter, who had been just 1-for-21 in the series, but the catcher came through, lashing a single to center to give the Mets the win and a one-game lead as the series shifted back to Houston.

Jesse Orosco again earned the win for New York by hurling two perfect innings.

=== Game 6 ===
Wednesday, October 15, 1986 2:05 pm (CT) at Astrodome in Houston, Texas 73 °F (23 °C), dome
Team	1	2	3	4	5	6	7	8	9	10	11	12	13	14	15	16	R	H	E
New York	0	0	0	0	0	0	0	0	3	0	0	0	0	1	0	3	7	11	0
Houston	3	0	0	0	0	0	0	0	0	0	0	0	0	1	0	2	6	11	1
WP: Jesse Orosco (3–0) LP: Aurelio López (0–1); Home runs: NYM: None; HOU: Billy Hatcher (1)

In one of the most famous games in baseball history, the Mets defeated Houston at the Astrodome 7–6 in 16 innings as Jesse Orosco struck out Kevin Bass on a slider for the final out with runners at first and second, and New York advanced to its third World Series in franchise history.

Houston took a 3–0 lead in the first inning against Bob Ojeda with an RBI double by Phil Garner, plus RBI singles from Glenn Davis and Jose Cruz, giving Astros' starter Bob Knepper an early advantage. They were unable to add more runs as Bass was thrown out at third base following Alan Ashby's botched attempt to lay down a suicide-squeeze bunt and then Ashby lined out to shortstop to end the inning.

That lead held up for most of the game as Knepper was dominant, allowing no runs through the first eight innings. Meanwhile, Ojeda allowed nothing more through his next four frames, after which Rick Aguilera tossed three scoreless innings.

This set the stage for a Mets' comeback in the top of the ninth that started when Lenny Dykstra tripled against Knepper to lead off. Mookie Wilson singled in Dykstra to cut it to 3–1 and then with one out, Keith Hernandez doubled to score Wilson and end Knepper's night as the left-hander was replaced by Dave Smith, who walked Gary Carter and Darryl Strawberry. Ray Knight then hit a sacrifice fly to right to score Hernandez and tie the game before Danny Heep struck out swinging with the bases loaded to end the inning.

Mets manager Davey Johnson used his bullpen aggressively, as Mike Scott, eventual series MVP, was scheduled to start in Game 7 and nobody on the Mets wanted to face him again. They had scored one run off of Scott in eighteen innings in his previous two outings, and several Mets players have since openly acknowledged that they considered this game a deciding game, playing it more like a Game 7 than a Game 6 because they were playing (despite the cockiness and arrogance that had characterized the team for most of the season) with the barely concealed belief that they would lose to Scott again if it got to Game 7. Roger McDowell came in to pitch for New York and allowed just one hit through five scoreless innings. Meanwhile, Houston pitchers Smith and Larry Andersen held the Mets hitless until the top of the 14th inning when Carter singled, Strawberry walked, and with one out Wally Backman singled off Aurelio López to plate Strawberry with the go-ahead run as Bass' throw home sailed high. The Mets still had the bases loaded before Wilson struck out to end the threat.

The Mets were now three outs away from going to the World Series. After Orosco struck Bill Doran out, Billy Hatcher homered off the left-field foul pole tie the game 4–4.

In the top of the 16th inning Strawberry doubled to lead off against López, followed by Knight's single that scored Strawberry to put the Mets ahead again. Jeff Calhoun then replaced López and threw two wild pitches, the second scoring Knight to put New York up by two. Dykstra then singled in Backman, who had walked, for a 7–4 Mets' advantage.

The Mets needed each of those three runs as Houston rallied once again when with one out, Davey Lopes drew a pinch-hit walk, followed by Bill Doran's single. Hatcher then singled in Lopes to make it 7–5, after which Denny Walling hit into a fielder's choice for the second out. Davis followed with a single to centerfield that landed in front of a charging Dykstra, that brought home Doran to cut it to 7–6 and moved Walling into scoring position. Now the tying run was in scoring position and the winning run was at first base, and would-be Game 7 starter Mike Scott was waiting in the wings. Orosco, opposite Kevin Bass, eventually found himself at a full count. A strike away from a pennant, and simultaneously a misplaced pitch away from loading the bases, Orosco struck out Bass to end the threat, the game and the series and sent the Mets to a World Series duel with the Boston Red Sox, winning them their first pennant in 13 years. According to Orosco, prior to the at-bat against Bass, Keith Hernandez ordered him to throw nothing but breaking balls to Bass, telling Orosco, "If you throw another fastball, we're gonna fight."

Orosco pitched three innings for his third win of the series, marking the first time a reliever had won three games in a postseason series. The time of the game was 4 hours and 42 minutes and the 16 innings was the most that had been played in a postseason contest at that time. The Mets and Astros had also played a 15-inning contest that lasted 5 hours and 29 minutes during the regular season, which Houston won 9–8.

In 2011, MLB Network ranked this as the fifth greatest game of the preceding 50 years.

This was the last game in which the Astros wore their "tequila sunrise" (or "rainbow guts") uniform top, which the franchise introduced in 1975 and became one of the most iconic, if infamous, uniforms in MLB history. The Astros demoted the tequila sunrise top to alternate status in 1987, and instead designated a white version of their restrained cream-colored road top as the official home top.

== Composite box ==
1986 NLCS (4–2): New York Mets over Houston Astros

Team	1	2	3	4	5	6	7	8	9	10	11	12	13	14	15	16	R	H	E
New York Mets	0	0	0	2	4	4	0	1	5	0	0	1	0	1	0	3	21	43	1
Houston Astros	5	5	0	0	2	0	2	0	0	0	0	0	0	1	0	2	17	49	7
Total attendance: 299,316 Average attendance: 49,886

== Series statistics ==
Astros' pitcher Mike Scott was named the series' Most Valuable Player after going 2–0 with a 0.50 earned-run average, allowing one earned run on eight hits and one walk in 18 innings. Also for Houston, Nolan Ryan went 0–1 with a 3.86 ERA, striking out 17 through 14 innings, and Bob Knepper posted an ERA of 3.52 with no decisions in his two starts. The Astros' bullpen allowed seven runs and took three of the losses in the series as Dave Smith (9.00 ERA), Charlie Kerfeld (8.10), and Aurelio López (2.25) dropped decisions.

For the Mets' pitching staff, lefty reliever Jesse Orosco went 3–0 with an ERA of 3.38 in the series, allowing three earned runs on five hits and two walks in eight innings. He was the first reliever ever to win 3 games in a playoff series, setting a record. Ojeda notched New York's other victory and was 1–0 with a 2.57 ERA in his 14 innings of work. Dwight Gooden went 0–1 with an ERA of 1.06 in 17 innings and Ron Darling had no decisions with a 7.20 ERA with Sid Fernandez going 0–1 with a 4.50 ERA as they each made one start. Right-hander Roger McDowell allowed no earned runs and one hit in seven innings of relief work.

The Astros' offense saw Billy Hatcher bat .280 with three walks, a home run, and two RBI and three stolen bases for the series. Glenn Davis hit .269 with a home run and three RBI, Kevin Bass batted .292 with two doubles and four walks, and Bill Doran had a homer with three RBI. Houston hit .218 with five home runs in the six games.

For New York, Lenny Dykstra batted .304 with a double, triple, home run, and three RBI. Keith Hernandez hit .269 with three RBI and Strawberry homered twice with five RBI to go with 12 strikeouts. The Mets batted .189 with three homers for the series.

Despite losing, the Astros outplayed the Mets for most of the series. The Astros were tied or leading in 55 of the 64 innings played in the six-game series. Houston's pitching also dominated. The Mets struck out 57 times and had the lowest team batting average, .189, of any National League Championship Series winner.

== Aftermath ==
Like 1980, the Astros came up once again on the wrong end of a classic series. In all, four of the games in the NLCS came down to one run, and two runs decided a fifth game. The series featured a pair of extra-inning games that combined for a postseason record 10 innings of extra play. Despite only going six games, Fangraphs, via a mathematical formula, named it the 6th best playoff series in MLB history in 2011. The Mets would win another instant-classic series a week and a half later when they beat the Boston Red Sox in seven games to win their second World Series in franchise history.

During and years after the '86 NLCS, Mets players expressed belief that Astros' ace pitcher Mike Scott was illegally scuffing the ball during his Cy Young award winning season. In spring training of 1987, Gary Carter even stated the defending champion Mets had "unfinished business" when discussing Scott's performance against them in the NLCS. Scott performed well in 1987, posting 3.23 earned run average against a 16-13 record, but his strikeout rate fell from 10 strikeouts per 9 to 8.5. Scott posted a loss to the Mets twice in 1987, losing a pitcher's duel to Sid Fernandez in April at Shea and getting roughed up in a start in Houston in July. Overall, the Mets were still one of the best teams in baseball in 1987, but finished three games behind the St. Louis Cardinals in the NL East, thus not qualifying for the postseason. In an MLB Network’s documentary about the 1986 season in 2011, Mike Scott finally admitted to "doctoring" the baseball during that season for the first time publicly.

The Astros chances at a pennant and World Series slipped away in the subsequent seasons after 1986. Mike Scott continued to perform as one of the best pitchers in baseball until an arm injury in 1991 forced him to retire. Nolan Ryan left Houston after a contract dispute following the 1988 season and signed with the Texas Rangers, where he stayed until his retirement at the age of 46. Ryan returned to the Astros in 2014 as an executive adviser under owner Jim Crane, a position he held until 2019. The Astros did not make the postseason again until 1997.

Game 6 would end up being the final MLB game that Keith Jackson would do play by play for ABC Sports. Jackson would continue to call various other sports for the network (most notably their college football telecasts) until his retirement after the 2006 Rose Bowl.
