= Mike Scott (baseball) =

American baseball player (born 1955)

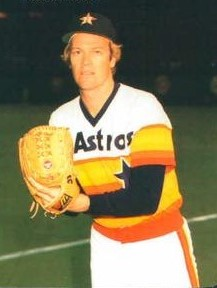
- Pitcher
- Born: April 26, 1955 (age 71); Santa Monica, California, U.S.
- Batted: Right Threw: Right

MLB debut
- April 18, 1979, for the New York Mets

Last MLB appearance
- April 13, 1991, for the Houston Astros

MLB statistics
- Win–loss record: 124–108
- Earned run average: 3.54
- Strikeouts: 1,469
- Stats at Baseball Reference

Teams
- New York Mets (1979–1982); Houston Astros (1983–1991)

Career highlights and awards
- 3× All-Star (1986, 1987, 1989); NL Cy Young Award (1986); NLCS MVP (1986); NL wins leader (1989); MLB ERA leader (1986); MLB strikeout leader (1986); Pitched a no-hitter on September 25, 1986; Houston Astros No. 33 retired; Houston Astros Hall of Fame
Medals
Men's baseball
Representing United States
Pan American Games
Silver medal – second place	1975 Mexico City	Team

Michael Warren Scott (born April 26, 1955) is an American former professional baseball pitcher who played 13 seasons in Major League Baseball for both the New York Mets and the Houston Astros. He won the National League Cy Young Award in 1986, becoming the first Astros pitcher to win the award. Scott is part of a select group of pitchers that have thrown a no-hitter and struck out 300 batters in the same season.

== Professional career ==
=== Early career ===
==== New York Mets ====
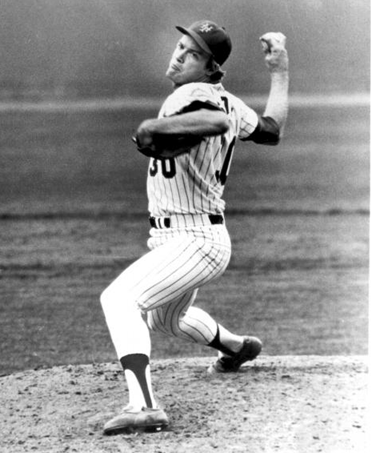
1979 publicity photo of Scott in action for New York Mets

Scott was selected by the New York Mets in the second round of the 1976 Major League Baseball draft from Pepperdine University. He made his major league debut with the Mets in 1979. By the end of the 1982 season, Scott had compiled a 14–27 record with a 4.65 earned run average (ERA) and three saves. After going 7–13 with a 5.14 ERA in 37 games with the Mets in 1982, he was traded to the Houston Astros for Danny Heep at the Winter Meetings on December 10.

=== Houston Astros ===
==== 1983–1985 seasons ====
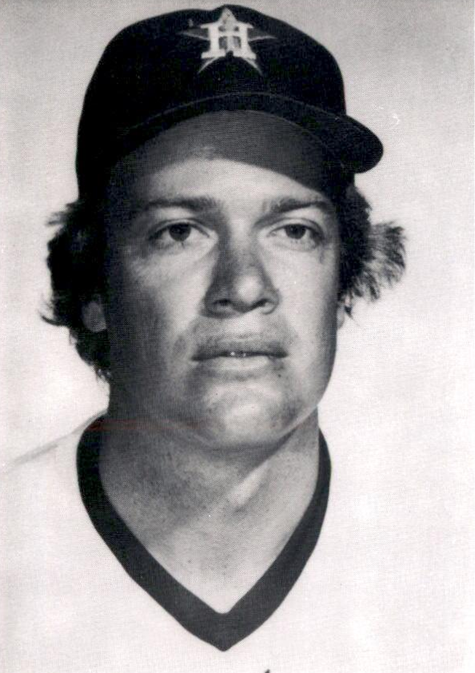
Scott in 1984 photocard for Houston Astros

During his first season in Houston in 1983, Scott produced mostly successful results, making 24 starts and going 10–6 with a 3.72 earned run average. However, he struggled in 1984, going 5–11 with a 4.68 ERA for the Astros.

The turning point in Scott's career came in 1985, when he became a student of pitching coach Roger Craig. Craig taught Scott the split-finger fastball, a pitch he had made famous while coaching the pitchers of the 1984 World Series champion Detroit Tigers. Scott became an 18-game winner in 1985 and was rewarded with a three-year deal with the Astros, valued at $2 million. However, there were rumors that Scott's dominating performance was the result of ball scuffing. Scott had been accused of using sandpaper by the Chicago Cubs in 1985. In August 1986, Roger Craig, then the manager of the San Francisco Giants, complained that Scott's real secret was that he scuffed the baseball. "It's great," Scott said of the charges. "Any time you have hitters coming to the plate thinking you're doing something, it takes their minds off the pitch . . . Nine times out of 10 the umpire will look at the ball and throw it right back to me."

==== 1986 season ====
Scott had his most successful season in 1986, when he posted an 18–10 record with a 2.22 ERA, striking out a league-leading 306 batters. On September 25 of that season, he threw a 2–0 no-hitter against the San Francisco Giants at the Astrodome to clinch the National League West division title for the Astros. This game was voted one of the top five games played in the Astrodome after the Astros moved to Enron Field following the 1999 season. He led a strong starting rotation that included Bob Knepper, Nolan Ryan, and Jim Deshaies. Scott had a stretch from May 9 to August 8 where he had a quality start (a minimum of six innings pitched without allowing more than three runs) in all twenty games started, setting a club record (the previous record was Don Wilson with fifteen in 1971). Scott's twenty starts would be a club record until Framber Valdez passed him on August 24, 2022.

Scott's outstanding form continued into the postseason, when Houston faced the Eastern Division champion New York Mets in the 1986 National League Championship Series (NLCS). The Astros lost the series in six games, but both Astros victories were courtesy of Scott's overwhelming starting pitching performances in Games 1 and 4. Scott yielded just 5 singles and struck out an LCS-record 14 hitters in Game 1. The Mets aggressively voiced their suspicions that Scott was doctoring the baseball to the media during the series, although nothing was ever found to support these claims. So dominant was Scott in those two games — 0.50 ERA, 19 strikeouts, 8 hits and only one walk in 18 innings — that the Mets considered Game 6 something of a "must win"; a loss would have meant facing an apparently unbeatable Mike Scott in Game 7 in the Astrodome. The Mets won Game 6 in 16 innings, averting another Scott start, to win the league pennant.

In recognition of his regular season performance, Scott was awarded the 1986 National League Cy Young Award as the league's best pitcher. Scott was also voted the NL 1986 NLCS Most Valuable Player (MVP), the first time in NLCS history that a member of the losing team was so honored (a year later, the San Francisco Giants' Jeffrey Leonard would become the second consecutive NLCS MVP of the losing team).

==== Later career ====
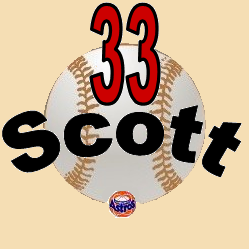
Mike Scott's number 33 was retired by the Houston Astros in 1992.

In 1987, Scott was the National League starter in the All-Star Game, and threw two scoreless innings. He was also the opening day starter for the Astros. He went 16–13 with a 3.23 earned run average, eight complete games and three shutouts in 247.2 innings while finishing second in the National League with 233 strikeouts.

In 1988, Scott once more was named the Astros' opening day starter. On June 12, he was denied a second no-hitter when the Atlanta Braves' Ken Oberkfell singled to right with two outs in the ninth inning. He had a 14–8 record with a 2.92 earned run average, eight complete games and five shutouts in 218.2 innings while having 190 strikeouts.

In 1989, Scott won 20 games (while losing 10) and finished second in NL Cy Young Award voting, behind reliever Mark Davis of the San Diego Padres. He was for the third consecutive time the opening day starter for the Astros. He had a 3.10 earned run average, nine complete games and 172 strikeouts in 229 innings pitched.

Injuries began to plague him shortly thereafter. His 1990 season was his last full season. He had a 9–13 record with a 3.81 earned run average in 32 games, having four complete games, two shutouts and 121 strikeouts in 205.2 innings. He played in just two games in the 1991 season, losing both games while lasting a total of seven innings, giving up 10 earned runs and having three strikeouts. Scott retired after the 1991 season. As of the 2021 season, he is fourth all-time for the Astros in wins (110) and fifth in strikeouts (1318), and sixth in games started (259). On October 3, 1992, he and his former teammate José Cruz had their jersey numbers retired by the Astros.

During his career with the Astros, Scott accumulated the most regular-season outings with a game score of 90 or higher in club history (6). (Note: Number of games in a career player meets criteria, playing for HOU, in the regular season, requiring Game Score ≥ 90, sorted by descending instances.) In the 1986 playoffs, Scott tossed one other such outing. (Note: Game 1 of the National League Championship Series.) (Note: Number of games in a career player meets criteria, playing for HOU, in the postseason, requiring Game Score ≥ 90, sorted by descending instances.)

== See also ==
- Houston Astros award winners and league leaders
- List of Houston Astros no-hitters
- List of Houston Astros team records
- List of Major League Baseball All-Star Game starting pitchers
- List of Major League Baseball annual shutout leaders
- List of Major League Baseball no-hitters
- List of Major League Baseball single-inning strikeout leaders
- List of Pan American Games medalists in baseball

== Notes ==
Awards and achievements
Preceded by Joe Cowley	No-hitter pitcher September 25, 1986	Succeeded by Juan Nieves
Preceded by Rick Reuschel	National League Pitcher of the Month; June 1989	Succeeded by Mark Langston
