= 1985 St. Louis Cardinals season =

Major League Baseball season

1985 St. Louis Cardinals
- National League champions National League East champions
- League: National League
- Division: Eastern Division
- Ballpark: Busch Memorial Stadium
- City: St. Louis, Missouri
- Record: 101–61 (.623)
- Divisional place: 1st
- Owners: August "Gussie" Busch
- General managers: Dal Maxvill
- Managers: Whitey Herzog
- Television: KSDK–TV 5 (Jack Buck, Mike Shannon, Jay Randolph, Al Hrabosky)
- Radio: KMOX–AM 1020 (Jack Buck, Mike Shannon)

The 1985 St. Louis Cardinals season was the Cardinals' 104th season in St. Louis, Missouri and the 94th season in the National League. The Cardinals went 101–61 during the season (their best record in the Herzog era and all of baseball that year) and finished in first place in the National League East division by three games over the New York Mets. After defeating the Los Angeles Dodgers in six games in the NLCS, they lost in seven games in the World Series to their cross-state rivals, the Kansas City Royals in the I-70 Series. The World Series is known for the infamous "safe" call on the Royals' Jorge Orta by umpire Don Denkinger.

The Cardinals switched back to their traditional gray road uniforms for the first time in ten seasons.

Outfielder Willie McGee won the National League MVP Award this year, batting .353 with 10 home runs and 82 RBIs. Outfielder Vince Coleman won the National League Rookie of the Year Award this year, batting .267 with 107 runs scored and 110 stolen bases. Shortstop Ozzie Smith and McGee both won Gold Gloves this year.

During the 1985 playoffs, the Cardinals used the slogan The Heat Is On, in reference to the song that was released earlier that year.

== Offseason ==
- November 9, 1984: Dave Von Ohlen was released by the Cardinals.
- December 12, 1984: George Hendrick and Steve Barnard (minors) were traded by the Cardinals to the Pittsburgh Pirates for Brian Harper and John Tudor.
- January 3, 1985: Alex Cole was drafted by the Cardinals in the 2nd round of the 1985 amateur draft. Player signed May 6, 1985.
- January 23, 1985: Mike LaValliere was signed as a free agent by the Cardinals.
- February 1, 1985: Dave LaPoint, David Green, José Uribe and Gary Rajsich were traded by the Cardinals to the San Francisco Giants for Jack Clark

== Regular season ==
=== Opening Day starters ===
- Steve Braun
- Jack Clark
- Bob Forsch
- Tom Herr
- Mike LaValliere
- Willie McGee
- Terry Pendleton
- Ozzie Smith
- Andy Van Slyke

=== Season standings ===
NL East
| Team | W | L | Pct. | GB | Home | Road |
|---|---|---|---|---|---|---|
| St. Louis Cardinals | 101 | 61 | .623 | — | 54‍–‍27 | 47‍–‍34 |
| New York Mets | 98 | 64 | .605 | 3 | 51‍–‍30 | 47‍–‍34 |
| Montreal Expos | 84 | 77 | .522 | 16½ | 44‍–‍37 | 40‍–‍40 |
| Chicago Cubs | 77 | 84 | .478 | 23½ | 41‍–‍39 | 36‍–‍45 |
| Philadelphia Phillies | 75 | 87 | .463 | 26 | 41‍–‍40 | 34‍–‍47 |
| Pittsburgh Pirates | 57 | 104 | .354 | 43½ | 35‍–‍45 | 22‍–‍59 |

=== Record vs. opponents ===
1985 National League record Sources:
| Team | ATL | CHC | CIN | HOU | LAD | MON | NYM | PHI | PIT | SD | SF | STL |
|---|---|---|---|---|---|---|---|---|---|---|---|---|
| Atlanta | — | 5–7 | 7–11 | 8–10 | 5–13 | 3–9 | 2–10 | 10–2 | 6–6 | 7–11 | 10–8 | 3–9 |
| Chicago | 7–5 | — | 5–6 | 5–7 | 5–7 | 7–11 | 4–14 | 13–5 | 13–5 | 8–4 | 6–6 | 4–14 |
| Cincinnati | 11–7 | 6–5 | — | 11–7 | 7–11 | 8–4 | 4–8 | 7–5 | 9–3 | 9–9 | 12–6 | 5–7 |
| Houston | 10–8 | 7–5 | 7–11 | — | 6–12 | 6–6 | 4–8 | 4–8 | 6–6 | 12–6 | 15–3 | 6–6 |
| Los Angeles | 13–5 | 7–5 | 11–7 | 12–6 | — | 7–5 | 7–5 | 4–8 | 8–4 | 8–10 | 11–7 | 7–5 |
| Montreal | 9–3 | 11–7 | 4–8 | 6–6 | 5–7 | — | 9–9 | 8–10 | 9–8 | 5–7 | 7–5 | 11–7 |
| New York | 10–2 | 14–4 | 8–4 | 8–4 | 5–7 | 9–9 | — | 11–7 | 10–8 | 7–5 | 8–4 | 8–10 |
| Philadelphia | 2-10 | 5–13 | 5–7 | 8–4 | 8–4 | 10–8 | 7–11 | — | 11–7 | 5–7 | 6–6 | 8–10 |
| Pittsburgh | 6–6 | 5–13 | 3–9 | 6–6 | 4–8 | 8–9 | 8–10 | 7–11 | — | 4–8 | 3–9 | 3–15 |
| San Diego | 11–7 | 4–8 | 9–9 | 6–12 | 10–8 | 7–5 | 5–7 | 7–5 | 8–4 | — | 12–6 | 4–8 |
| San Francisco | 8–10 | 6–6 | 6–12 | 3–15 | 7–11 | 5–7 | 4–8 | 6–6 | 9–3 | 6–12 | — | 2–10 |
| St. Louis | 9–3 | 14–4 | 7–5 | 6–6 | 5–7 | 7–11 | 10–8 | 10–8 | 15–3 | 8–4 | 10–2 | — |

=== Notable transactions ===
- April 21, 1985: Matt Keough was signed as a free agent by the Cardinals.
- June 3, 1985: Steve Peters was drafted by the Cardinals in the 5th round of the 1985 Major League Baseball draft.
- July 22, 1985: Gary Rajsich was purchased by the Cardinals from the San Francisco Giants.
- August 29, 1985: Mark Jackson (minors) was traded by the Cardinals to the Cincinnati Reds for César Cedeño.

=== Roster ===
1985 St. Louis Cardinals
Roster
| Pitchers: 13 Neil Allen; 47 Joaquín Andújar; 40 Doug Bair; 36 Joe Boever; 39 Bill Campbell; 34 Danny Cox; 46 Ken Dayley; 31 Bob Forsch; 44,41 Andy Hassler; 49 Ricky Horton; 33 Matt Keough; 50 Kurt Kepshire; 32 Jeff Lahti; 37 Pat Perry; 30 John Tudor; 38 Todd Worrell | Catchers: 10 Randy Hunt; 10 Mike LaValliere; 23 Tom Nieto; 15 Darrell Porter; Infielders: 7 César Cedeño; 22 Jack Clark; 11 Iván DeJesús; 28 Tom Herr; 7 Art Howe; 19 Mike Jorgensen; 12 Tom Lawless; 9 Terry Pendleton; 1 Ozzie Smith | Outfielders: 26 Steve Braun; 29 Vince Coleman; 27 Curt Ford; 25 Brian Harper; 21 Tito Landrum; 51 Willie McGee; 27 Lonnie Smith; 18 Andy Van Slyke | Manager: 24 Whitey Herzog; Coaches: 8 Hal Lanier; 16 Nick Leyva; 3 Dave Ricketts; 4 Mike Roarke; 2 Red Schoendienst |

== Game log ==
=== Regular season ===
1985 regular season game log: 101–61 (Home: 54–27; Away: 47–34)
April: 8–11 (Home: 7–3; Away: 1–8)

| # | Date | Time (CT) | Opponent | Score | Win | Loss | Save | Time of Game | Attendance | Record | Box/ Streak |
|---|---|---|---|---|---|---|---|---|---|---|---|
| 1 | April 9 | 12:35 p.m. CST | @ Mets | L 5–6 (10) | Gorman (1–0) | **Allen** (0–1) | – | 3:42 | 46,781 | 0–1 | L1 |
| 2 | April 11 | 12:35 p.m. CST | @ Mets | L 1–2 (11) | McDowell (1–0) | **Hassler** (0–1) | – | 3:26 | 18,864 | 0–2 | L2 |
| 3 | April 12 | 5:05 p.m. CST | @ Pirates | L 4–6 | Robinson (1–0) | **Kepshire** (0–1) | Candelaria (1) | 2:34 | 47,335 | 0–3 | L3 |
| 4 | April 13 | 6:05 p.m. CST | @ Pirates | L 3–4 | Candelaria (1–0) | **Campbell** (0–1) | – | 2:36 | 9,171 | 0–4 | L4 |
| 5 | April 14 | 12:35 p.m. CST | @ Pirates | **W** 10–4 | **Andújar** (1–0) | Rhoden (0–2) | – | 2:44 | 12,483 | 1–4 | W1 |
| 6 | April 15 | 7:35 p.m. CST | Expos | **W** 6–1 | **Forsch** (1–0) | Gullickson (1–1) | – | 2:09 | 42,986 | 2–4 | W2 |
| 7 | April 17 | 7:35 p.m. CST | Expos | L 1–2 | Hesketh (1–0) | **Tudor** (0–1) | Reardon (1) | 2:14 | 20,145 | 2–5 | L1 |
| 8 | April 18 | 12:35 p.m. CST | Expos | L 1–7 | Rogers (1–2) | **Kepshire** (0–2) | – | 2:31 | 19,953 | 2–6 | L2 |
| 9 | April 19 | 7:35 p.m. CST | Pirates | **W** 5–4 | **Andújar** (2–0) | Candelaria (1–2) | **Allen** (1) | 2:44 | 30,510 | 3–6 | W1 |
| 10 | April 20 | 7:05 p.m. CST | Pirates | **W** 4–3 | **Cox** (1–0) | Tunnell (0–1) | **Allen** (2) | 2:28 | 32,978 | 4–6 | W2 |
| 11 | April 21 | 1:15 p.m. CST | Pirates | **W** 6–0 | **Forsch** (2–0) | DeLeón (0–2) | – | 2:27 | 28,880 | 5–6 | W3 |
| 12 | April 22 | 7:35 p.m. CST | Mets | L 6–7 | Schiraldi (1–0) | **Tudor** (0–2) | Orosco (2) | 2:49 | 16,324 | 5–7 | L1 |
| 13 | April 23 | 7:35 p.m. CST | Mets | **W** 8–3 | **Kepshire** (1–2) | Gorman (1–1) | – | 2:49 | 13,028 | 6–7 | W1 |
| 14 | April 24 | 12:35 p.m. CST | Mets | **W** 5–1 | **Andújar** (3–0) | Gooden (2–1) | – | 2:16 | 29,282 | 7–7 | W2 |
| 15 | April 25 | 12:35 p.m. CST | @ Expos | L 2–4 | Gullickson (3–1) | **Cox** (1–1) | Reardon (4) | 2:23 | 10,203 | 7–8 | L1 |
| 16 | April 26 | 2:35 p.m. CST | @ Expos | L 5–10 | Palmer (1–2) | **Forsch** (2–1) | – | 3:04 | 10,264 | 7–9 | L2 |
| 17 | April 27 | 12:35 p.m. CST | @ Expos | L 3–8 | Hesketh (2–1) | **Tudor** (0–3) | Roberge (1) | 2:30 | 15,171 | 7–10 | L3 |
| 18 | April 28 | 12:35 p.m. CDT | @ Expos | L 3–5 | Rogers (2–2) | **Kepshire** (1–3) | Reardon (5) | 3:16 | 14,426 | 7–11 | L4 |
| 19 | April 30 | 7:35 p.m. CDT | Dodgers | **W** 6–1 | **Andújar** (4–0) | Reuss (1–3) | – | 2:40 | 20,380 | 8–11 | W1 |

May: 16–10 (Home: 7–3; Away: 9–7)

| # | Date | Time (CT) | Opponent | Score | Win | Loss | Save | Time of Game | Attendance | Record | Box/ Streak |
|---|---|---|---|---|---|---|---|---|---|---|---|
| 20 | May 1 | 12:35 p.m. CDT | Dodgers | L 1–2 (12) | Howell (1–1) | **Allen** (0–2) | Niedenfuer (1) | 3:40 | 14,324 | 8–12 | L1 |
| 21 | May 3 | 7:35 p.m. CDT | Giants | **W** 8–1 | **Tudor** (1–3) | Krukow (2–1) | – | 2:27 | 32,441 | 9–12 | W1 |
| 22 | May 4 | 7:05 p.m. CDT | Giants | **W** 6–4 | **Kepshire** (2–3) | Hammaker (0–3) | **Lahti** (1) | 2:27 | 41,410 | 10–12 | W2 |
| 23 | May 5 | 1:15 p.m. CDT | Giants | L 0–5 | LaPoint (1–4) | **Andújar** (4–1) | – | 2:22 | 31,322 | 10–13 | L1 |
| 24 | May 6 | 7:35 p.m. CDT | Padres | **W** 5–2 | **Cox** (2–1) | Show (2–1) | **Lahti** (2) | 2:41 | 28,260 | 11–13 | W1 |
| 25 | May 7 | 12:35 p.m. CDT | Padres | L 2–12 | Dravecky (1–2) | **Forsch** (2–2) | – | 2:26 | 18,682 | 11–14 | L1 |
| 26 | May 8 | 9:35 p.m. CDT | @ Dodgers | L 2–5 | Honeycutt (2–2) | **Tudor** (1–4) | Howell (4) | 2:28 | 33,748 | 11–15 | L2 |
| 27 | May 9 | 9:35 p.m. CDT | @ Dodgers | **W** 5–4 (10) | **Allen** (1–2) | Howell (2–2) | **Dayley** (1) | 3:34 | 37,775 | 12–15 | W1 |
| 28 | May 10 | 10:05 p.m. CDT | @ Giants | **W** 9–3 | **Andújar** (5–1) | LaPoint (1–5) | **Campbell** (1) | 2:37 | 12,900 | 13–15 | W2 |
| 29 | May 11 | 3:05 p.m. CDT | @ Giants | **W** 9–4 | **Cox** (3–1) | Laskey (1–4) | – | 2:47 | 16,154 | 14–15 | W3 |
| 30 | May 12 | 3:05 p.m. CDT | @ Giants | L 4–5 (10) | Garrelts (2–1) | **Allen** (1–3) | – | 3:11 | 19,614 | 14–16 | L1 |
| 31 | May 14 | 9:05 p.m. CDT | @ Padres | L 2–6 | Hawkins (7–0) | **Tudor** (1–5) | Thurmond (1) | 2:31 | 23,904 | 14–17 | L2 |
| 32 | May 15 | 9:05 p.m. CDT | @ Padres | **W** 14–4 | **Andújar** (6–1) | Hoyt (2–4) | – | 2:48 | 27,368 | 15–17 | W1 |
| 33 | May 17 | 7:35 p.m. CDT | @ Astros | **W** 8–6 | **Campbell** (1–1) | Calhoun (0–1) | **Dayley** (2) | 2:53 | 14,501 | 16–17 | W2 |
| 34 | May 18 | 7:35 p.m. CDT | @ Astros | L 5–6 | Ryan (3–2) | **Kepshire** (2–4) | Ross (1) | 2:43 | 39,828 | 16–18 | L1 |
| 35 | May 19 | 2:05 p.m. CDT | @ Astros | L 3–7 | Mathis (3–1) | **Tudor** (1–6) | Dawley (2) | 2:38 | 15,652 | 16–19 | L2 |
| 36 | May 20 | 7:35 p.m. CDT | Braves | **W** 14–0 | **Andújar** (7–1) | Smith (2–3) | – | 2:37 | 25,112 | 17–19 | W1 |
| 37 | May 21 | 7:35 p.m. CDT | Braves | **W** 6–3 | **Cox** (4–1) | Barker (1–4) | **Horton** (1) | 2:40 | 27,541 | 18–19 | W2 |
| 38 | May 22 | 12:35 p.m. CDT | Braves | **W** 5–3 | **Forsch** (3–2) | Mahler (8–3) | **Dayley** (3) | 2:24 | 28,729 | 19–19 | W3 |
| 39 | May 24 | 6:35 p.m. CDT | @ Reds | L 6–7 (12) | Franco (1–1) | **Horton** (0–1) | – | 3:49 | 20,665 | 19–20 | L1 |
| 40 | May 25 | 6:05 p.m. CDT | @ Reds | **W** 6–4 | **Andújar** (8–1) | Tibbs (3–7) | **Dayley** (4) | 2:50 | 24,846 | 20–20 | W1 |
| 41 | May 26 | 1:15 p.m. CDT | @ Reds | **W** 7–2 | **Cox** (5–1) | Stuper (5–3) | – | 2:22 | 21,349 | 21–20 | W2 |
| 42 | May 28 | 6:40 p.m. CDT | @ Braves | **W** 9–3 | **Forsch** (4–2) | Smith (2–4) | **Lahti** (3) | 2:42 | 9,856 | 22–20 | W3 |
| 43 | May 29 | 6:40 p.m. CDT | @ Braves | L 3–5 | Bedrosian (2–3) | **Tudor** (1–7) | Sutter (9) | 2:22 | 8,557 | 22–21 | L1 |
| 44 | May 30 | 6:40 p.m. CDT | @ Braves | **W** 6–0 | **Andújar** (9–1) | Mahler (8–4) | **Campbell** (2) | 2:25 | 13,503 | 23–21 | W1 |
| 45 | May 31 | 7:35 p.m. CDT | Reds | **W** 5–0 | **Cox** (6–1) | Stuper (5–4) | – | 2:05 | 38,910 | 24–21 | W2 |

June: 19–8 (Home: 10–4; Away: 9–4)

| # | Date | Time (CT) | Opponent | Score | Win | Loss | Save | Time of Game | Attendance | Record | Box/ Streak |
|---|---|---|---|---|---|---|---|---|---|---|---|
| 46 | June 1 | 12:20 p.m. CDT | Reds | L 3–9 | Browning (5–4) | **Kepshire** (2–5) | Hume (2) | 2:53 | 35,586 | 24–22 | L1 |
| 47 | June 2 | 1:15 p.m. CDT | Reds | L 3–8 | Tibbs (4–7) | **Forsch** (4–3) | – | 2:29 | 33,774 | 24–23 | L2 |
| 48 | June 3 | 7:35 p.m. CDT | Astros | **W** 9–5 | **Tudor** (2–7) | Ryan (5–3) | **Dayley** (5) | 2:35 | 18,891 | 25–23 | W1 |
| 49 | June 4 | 7:35 p.m. CDT | Astros | **W** 6–1 | **Andújar** (10–1) | Niekro (2–6) | – | 2:30 | 23,203 | 26–23 | W2 |
| 50 | June 5 | 7:35 p.m. CDT | Astros | L 3–8 | Knepper (6–1) | **Cox** (6–2) | DiPino (5) | 2:41 | 23,998 | 26–24 | L1 |
| 51 | June 7 | 7:05 p.m. CDT | @ Mets | **W** 7–2 (13) | **Campbell** (2–1) | Sisk (1–4) | – | 4:14 | 34,490 | 27–24 | W1 |
| 52 | June 8 | 12:35 p.m. CDT | @ Mets | **W** 1–0 | **Tudor** (3–7) | Gorman (3–2) | – | 2:14 | 36,424 | 28–24 | W2 |
| 53 (1) | June 9 | 12:05 p.m. CDT | @ Mets | L 1–6 | Gooden (9–3) | **Forsch** (4–4) | – | 3:04 | – | 28–25 | L1 |
| 54 (2) | June 9 | 3:44 p.m. CDT | @ Mets | **W** 8–2 | **Andújar** (11–1) | Schiraldi (2–1) | – | 2:31 | 41,431 | 29–25 | W1 |
| 55 | June 10 | 6:35 p.m. CDT | @ Pirates | **W** 6–1 | **Cox** (7–2) | Rhoden (4–6) | – | 2:16 | 5,557 | 30–25 | W2 |
| 56 | June 11 | 6:35 p.m. CDT | @ Pirates | L 2–13 | Reuschel (3–0) | **Allen** (1–4) | – | 2:11 | 4,817 | 30–26 | L1 |
| — | June 12 | | @ Pirates | **Postponed (Rain)** (Makeup date: September 16) | | | | | | | |
| 57 | June 13 | 6:35 p.m. CDT | @ Pirates | **W** 2–1 | **Tudor** (4–7) | McWilliams (3–5) | **Lahti** (4) | 1:59 | 4,833 | 31–26 | W1 |
| 58 | June 14 | 3:05 p.m. CDT | @ Cubs | **W** 11–10 | **Andújar** (12–1) | Ruthven (3–5) | **Forsch** (1) | 3:16 | 36,745 | 32–26 | W2 |
| 59 | June 15 | 1:20 p.m. CDT | @ Cubs | **W** 2–0 | **Cox** (8–2) | Fontenot (1–2) | – | 2:37 | 34,716 | 33–26 | W3 |
| 60 | June 16 | 1:20 p.m. CDT | @ Cubs | **W** 5–2 | **Kepshire** (3–5) | Eckersley (7–4) | **Campbell** (3) | 2:34 | 36,262 | 34–26 | W4 |
| 61 | June 18 | 7:35 p.m. CDT | Phillies | **W** 6–2 | **Tudor** (5–7) | Carlton (1–7) | – | 2:49 | 34,089 | 35–26 | W5 |
| 62 | June 19 | 7:35 p.m. CDT | Phillies | L 0–1 | Koosman (2–1) | **Andújar** (12–2) | Carman (2) | 2:30 | 32,146 | 35–27 | L1 |
| 63 | June 20 | 7:35 p.m. CDT | Phillies | **W** 5–0 | **Cox** (9–2) | Gross (5–7) | – | 2:43 | 32,397 | 36–27 | W1 |
| 64 | June 21 | 7:35 p.m. CDT | Cubs | **W** 7–5 | **Kepshire** (4–5) | Eckersley (7–5) | **Lahti** (5) | 2:45 | 46,005 | 37–27 | W2 |
| 65 | June 22 | 7:05 p.m. CDT | Cubs | **W** 2–1 (10) | **Dayley** (1–0) | Smith (3–2) | – | 3:21 | 49,231 | 38–27 | W3 |
| 66 | June 23 | 1:15 p.m. CDT | Cubs | **W** 7–0 | **Tudor** (6–7) | Ruthven (3–6) | – | 1:59 | 45,881 | 39–27 | W4 |
| 67 | June 25 | 6:35 p.m. CDT | @ Phillies | L 1–3 | Koosman (3–1) | **Andújar** (12–3) | – | 2:03 | 24,432 | 39–28 | L1 |
| 68 | June 26 | 6:35 p.m. CDT | @ Phillies | L 4–6 | Denny (5–5) | **Cox** (9–3) | Tekulve (6) | 2:35 | 22,213 | 39–29 | L2 |
| 69 | June 27 | 2:05 p.m. CDT | @ Phillies | **W** 4–3 | **Kepshire** (5–5) | Rawley (5–6) | **Lahti** (6) | 2:42 | 22,691 | 40–29 | W1 |
| 70 | June 28 | 7:35 p.m. CDT | Mets | **W** 3–2 | **Tudor** (7–7) | Lynch (4–5) | **Dayley** (6) | 2:23 | 45,929 | 41–29 | W2 |
| 71 | June 29 | 7:05 p.m. CDT | Mets | **W** 6–0 | **Andújar** (13–3) | Aguilera (1–2) | – | 2:26 | 47,891 | 42–29 | W3 |
| 72 | June 30 | 1:15 p.m. CDT | Mets | **W** 2–1 (11) | **Dayley** (2–0) | Orosco (1–4) | – | 3:04 | 47,425 | 43–29 | W4 |

July: 17–9 (Home: 8–3; Away: 9–6)

| # | Date | Time (CT) | Opponent | Score | Win | Loss | Save | Time of Game | Attendance | Record | Box/ Streak |
|---|---|---|---|---|---|---|---|---|---|---|---|
| 73 | July 1 | 12:35 p.m. CDT | @ Expos | L 2–3 (10) | Lucas (3–0) | **Horton** (0–2) | – | 3:03 | 22,781 | 43–30 | L1 |
| 74 | July 2 | 6:35 p.m. CDT | @ Expos | **W** 4–0 | **Tudor** (8–7) | Palmer (6–7) | – | 2:52 | 25,487 | 44–30 | W1 |
| 75 | July 4 | 5:35 p.m. CDT | Dodgers | **W** 3–2 | **Andújar** (14–3) | Howell (4–4) | – | 3:05 | 38,394 | 45–30 | W2 |
| 76 | July 5 | 7:35 p.m. CDT | Dodgers | L 1–4 | Niedenfuer (3–2) | **Cox** (9–4) | Howell (7) | 2:22 | 39,296 | 45–31 | L1 |
| 77 | July 6 | 1:15 p.m. CDT | Dodgers | L 3–8 | Welch (2–1) | **Kepshire** (5–6) | – | 2:41 | 33,852 | 45–32 | L2 |
| 78 | July 7 | 1:15 p.m. CDT | Dodgers | **W** 7–1 | **Tudor** (9–7) | Hershiser (8–3) | – | 2:43 | 36,313 | 46–32 | W1 |
| 79 | July 8 | 7:35 p.m. CDT | Giants | **W** 6–1 | **Andújar** (15–3) | LaPoint (3–8) | – | 2:35 | 25,102 | 47–32 | W2 |
| 80 | July 9 | 7:35 p.m. CDT | Giants | **W** 3–1 | **Cox** (10–4) | Laskey (1–11) | – | 2:23 | 25,019 | 48–32 | W3 |
| 81 | July 10 | 7:35 p.m. CDT | Giants | **W** 7–3 | **Kepshire** (6–6) | | **Lahti** (7) | 2:38 | 30,196 | 49–32 | W4 |
| 82 | July 11 | 7:35 p.m. CDT | Padres | **W** 6–0 | **Tudor** (10–7) | Thurmond (3–7) | – | 2:27 | 32,805 | 50–32 | W5 |
| 83 | July 12 | 7:35 p.m. CDT | Padres | L 0–2 | Hoyt (12–4) | **Andújar** (15–4) | Gossage (18) | 2:14 | 44,199 | 50–33 | L1 |
| 84 | July 13 | 7:05 p.m. CDT | Padres | **W** 7–3 | **Cox** (11–4) | Wojna (1–2) | **Lahti** (8) | 2:31 | 36,313 | 51–33 | W1 |
| 85 | July 14 | 1:15 p.m. CDT | Padres | **W** 2–1 | **Kepshire** (7–6) | Dravecky (8–6) | **Lahti** (9) | 2:21 | 38,509 | 52–33 | W2 |
**56th All-Star Game in Minneapolis, MN**
| 86 | July 18 | 9:35 p.m. CDT | @ Dodgers | L 1–2 | Hershiser (9–3) | **Campbell** (2–2) | Niedenfuer (8) | 2:41 | 46,484 | 52–34 | L1 |
| 87 | July 19 | 9:35 p.m. CDT | @ Dodgers | L 2–5 | Welch (4–1) | **Cox** (11–5) | – | 2:15 | 49,472 | 52–35 | L2 |
| 88 | July 20 | 9:05 p.m. CDT | @ Dodgers | L 0–3 | Valenzuela (11–8) | **Tudor** (10–8) | – | 2:09 | 48,582 | 52–36 | L3 |
| 89 | July 21 | 3:05 p.m. CDT | @ Dodgers | **W** 4–2 (10) | **Lahti** (1–0) | Niedenfuer (4–3) | **Forsch** (2) | 3:12 | 40,380 | 53–36 | W1 |
| 90 | July 22 | 3:05 p.m. CDT | @ Giants | **W** 4–3 | **Andújar** (16–4) | LaPoint (4–9) | **Lahti** (10) | 2:43 | 5,954 | 54–36 | W2 |
| 91 | July 23 | 2:05 p.m. CDT | @ Giants | **W** 6–3 | **Cox** (12–5) | Krukow (6–8) | – | 2:44 | 7,688 | 55–36 | W3 |
| 92 | July 24 | 3:05 p.m. CDT | @ Giants | **W** 4–0 | **Tudor** (11–8) | Gott (4–8) | – | 2:24 | 11,012 | 56–36 | W4 |
| 93 | July 25 | 3:05 p.m. CDT | @ Padres | **W** 9–6 | **Dayley** (3–0) | Gossage (2–2) | **Lahti** (11) | 3:01 | 24,164 | 57–36 | W5 |
| 94 | July 26 | 9:05 p.m. CDT | @ Padres | **W** 2–1 (12) | **Andújar** (17–4) | Stoddard (1–5) | **Dayley** (7) | 3:07 | 28,811 | 58–36 | W6 |
| 95 | July 27 | 9:05 p.m. CDT | @ Padres | L 0–2 | Hawkins (13–3) | **Cox** (12–6) | Gossage (21) | 2:00 | 32,132 | 58–37 | L1 |
| 96 | July 28 | 3:05 p.m. CDT | @ Padres | **W** 4–2 | **Tudor** (11–9) | Hoyt (13–5) | **Lahti** (12) | 2:27 | 38,762 | 59–37 | W1 |
| 97 | July 30 | 3:05 p.m. CDT | @ Cubs | **W** 11–3 | **Kepshire** (8–6) | Engel (0–1) | – | 3:01 | 33,083 | 60–37 | W2 |
| 98 | July 31 | 1:20 p.m. CDT | @ Cubs | L 2–5 | Fontenot (4–5) | **Andújar** (17–5) | Smith (23) | 2:33 | 31,417 | 60–38 | L1 |

August: 17–11 (Home: 7–7; Away: 10–4)

| # | Date | Time (CT) | Opponent | Score | Win | Loss | Save | Time of Game | Attendance | Record | Box/ Streak |
|---|---|---|---|---|---|---|---|---|---|---|---|
| 99 | August 1 | 1:20 p.m. CDT | @ Cubs | L 8–9 (14) | Frazier (6–4) | **Dayley** (3–1) | – | 5:03 | 36,164 | 60–39 | L2 |
| 100 | August 2 | 7:35 p.m. CDT | Phillies | **W** 3–2 | **Tudor** (12–9) | Hudson (5–9) | – | 2:19 | 47,805 | 61–39 | W1 |
| 101 | August 3 | 7:05 p.m. CDT | Phillies | L 4–6 (10) | Carman (4–3) | **Lahti** (1–1) | Andersen (3) | 3:04 | 47,051 | 61–40 | L1 |
| 102 | August 4 | 1:15 p.m. CDT | Phillies | L 0–6 | Gross (11–8) | **Andújar** (17–6) | – | 2:25 | 46,674 | 61–41 | L2 |
| 103 | August 5 | 7:35 p.m. CDT | Phillies | L 1–9 | Rawley (8–6) | **Cox** (12–7) | – | 2:15 | 36,689 | 61–42 | L3 |
| — | August 6 | | Cubs | **Postponed (Strike)** (Makeup date: September 9) | | | | | | | |
| — | August 7 | | Cubs | **Postponed (Strike)** (Makeup date: September 5) | | | | | | | |
| 104 | August 8 | 7:35 p.m. CDT | Cubs | **W** 8–0 | **Tudor** (14–8) | Sanderson (5–5) | – | 2:18 | 39,203 | 62–42 | W1 |
| 105 | August 9 | 7:05 p.m. CDT | @ Phillies | **W** 5–4 | **Andújar** (18–6) | Hudson (5–10) | **Lahti** (13) | 2:36 | 25,194 | 63–42 | W2 |
| 106 (1) | August 10 | 4:35 p.m. CDT | @ Phillies | **W** 5–4 | **Cox** (13–7) | Koosman (6–3) | **Lahti** (14) | 2:31 | – | 64–42 | W3 |
| 107 (2) | August 10 | 7:41 p.m. CDT | @ Phillies | **W** 13–4 | **Horton** (1–2) | Gross (11–9) | – | 3:02 | 37,321 | 65–42 | W4 |
| 108 | August 11 | 12:35 p.m. CDT | @ Phillies | L 1–4 | Rawley (9–6) | **Forsch** (4–5) | – | 2:02 | 31,602 | 65–43 | L1 |
| 109 | August 12 | 7:35 p.m. CDT | Pirates | **W** 8–1 | **Tudor** (15–8) | Winn (2–5) | – | 3:07 | 24,516 | 66–43 | W1 |
| 110 | August 13 | 7:35 p.m. CDT | Pirates | **W** 6–5 | **Andújar** (19–6) | Robinson (2–8) | **Dayley** (8) | 2:54 | 30,469 | 67–43 | W2 |
| — | August 14 | | Pirates | **Postponed (Rain)** (Makeup date: August 15) | | | | | | | |
| 111 (1) | August 15 | 12:35 p.m. CDT | Pirates | **W** 3–1 | **Kepshire** (9–6) | Reuschel (8–6) | **Dayley** (9) | 2:10 | – | 68–43 | W3 |
| 112 (2) | August 15 | 3:20 p.m. CDT | Pirates | **W** 4–3 (12) | **Campbell** (3–2) | Guante (3–5) | – | 4:14 | 34,170 | 69–43 | W4 |
| 113 | August 16 | 7:35 p.m. CDT | Expos | **W** 6–1 | **Forsch** (5–5) | Laskey (5–12) | – | 2:26 | 40,873 | 70–43 | W5 |
| 114 | August 17 | 7:05 p.m. CDT | Expos | L 4–5 | Burke (8–0) | **Campbell** (3–3) | Lucas (1) | 2:55 | 45,093 | 70–44 | L1 |
| 115 | August 18 | 1:15 p.m. CDT | Expos | L 5–6 (10) | Lucas (4–2) | **Andújar** (19–7) | Reardon (31) | 3:20 | 39,813 | 70–45 | L2 |
| 116 | August 20 | 7:35 p.m. CDT | @ Astros | L 2–17 | Scott (13–6) | **Kepshire** (9–7) | – | 2:27 | 10,348 | 70–46 | L3 |
| 117 | August 21 | 7:35 p.m. CDT | @ Astros | **W** 7–4 | **Lahti** (2–1) | Smith (6–5) | – | 2:53 | 14,164 | 71–46 | W1 |
| 118 | August 22 | 7:35 p.m. CDT | @ Astros | **W** 2–1 | **Horton** (2–2) | Calhoun (1–2) | **Dayley** (10) | 2:43 | 14,555 | 71–47 | W2 |
| 119 | August 23 | 6:40 p.m. CDT | @ Braves | **W** 6–2 | **Andújar** (20–7) | McMurtry (0–3) | **Lahti** (15) | 2:51 | 19,958 | 72–47 | W3 |
| 120 | August 24 | 6:40 p.m. CDT | @ Braves | **W** 7–0 (6) | **Forsch** (6–5) | Barker (1–6) | – | 1:40 | 31,109 | 73–47 | W4 |
| 121 | August 25 | 1:10 p.m. CDT | @ Braves | **W** 5–2 | **Kepshire** (10–7) | Mahler (16–12) | **Campbell** (4) | 2:39 | 14,711 | 74–47 | W5 |
| 122 | August 26 | 6:35 p.m. CDT | @ Reds | **W** 3–0 | **Cox** (14–7) | Tibbs (6–15) | – | 2:16 | 28,071 | 76–46 | W6 |
| 123 | August 27 | 6:35 p.m. CDT | @ Reds | **W** 6–4 | **Campbell** (4–3) | Power (4–4) | **Lahti** (16) | 2:50 | 22,268 | 77–46 | W7 |
| 124 | August 28 | 6:35 p.m. CDT | @ Reds | L 6–7 (12) | Power (5–4) | **Lahti** (2–2) | – | 4:13 | 21,049 | 77–47 | L1 |
| 125 | August 30 | 7:35 p.m. CDT | Astros | L 5–7 | Scott (13–6) | **Kepshire** (14–7) | Smith (20) | 2:39 | 31,975 | 77–48 | L2 |
| 126 | August 31 | 7:05 p.m. CDT | Astros | L 1–3 | Knepper (11–10) | **Cox** (14–8) | – | 2:29 | 38,387 | 77–49 | L3 |

September: 21–9 (Home: 12–4; Away: 9–5)

| # | Date | Time (CT) | Opponent | Score | Win | Loss | Save | Time of Game | Attendance | Record | Box/ Streak |
|---|---|---|---|---|---|---|---|---|---|---|---|
| 127 | September 1 | 1:15 p.m. CDT | Astros | **W** 5–0 | **Tudor** (16–8) | Niekro (9–11) | – | 2:34 | 31,927 | 78–49 | W1 |
| 128 | September 2 | 5:35 p.m. CDT | Reds | L 1–4 | Browning (15–9) | **Andújar** (20–8) | Franco (9) | 2:15 | 29,026 | 78–50 | L1 |
| 129 | September 3 | 7:35 p.m. CDT | Reds | **W** 6–4 | **Lahti** (3–2) | Hume (2–4) | – | 2:43 | 19,261 | 79–50 | W1 |
| 130 | September 4 | 7:35 p.m. CDT | Reds | **W** 4–3 | **Worrell** (1–0) | Robinson (5–4) | – | 2:33 | 25,425 | 80–50 | W2 |
| 131 | September 5 | 7:35 p.m. CDT | Cubs | **W** 6–1 | **Cox** (15–8) | Engel (1–3) | – | 2:21 | 33,693 | 81–50 | W3 |
| 132 | September 6 | 7:35 p.m. CDT | Braves | **W** 8–0 | **Tudor** (17–8) | Mahler (17–14) | – | 2:41 | 25,821 | 82–50 | W4 |
| 133 | September 7 | 7:05 p.m. CDT | Braves | L 1–3 | Bedrosian (6–11) | **Andújar** (20–9) | Sutter (22) | 2:30 | 38,091 | 82–51 | L1 |
| 134 | September 8 | 1:15 p.m. CDT | Braves | L 3–7 | Johnson (4–0) | **Forsch** (6–6) | – | 2:48 | 24,930 | 82–52 | L2 |
| 135 | September 9 | 7:35 p.m. CDT | Cubs | L 1–3 | Fontenot (6–8) | **Kepshire** (10–9) | Meridith (1) | 3:00 | 32,808 | 82–53 | L3 |
| 136 | September 10 | 6:35 p.m. CDT | @ Mets | L 4–5 | Darling (15–5) | **Cox** (15–9) | McDowell (13) | 2:34 | 50,195 | 82–54 | L4 |
| 137 | September 11 | 6:35 p.m. CDT | @ Mets | **W** 1–0 (10) | **Tudor** (18–6) | Orosco (5–5) | – | 3:03 | 52,616 | 83–54 | W1 |
| 138 | September 12 | 12:35 p.m. CDT | @ Mets | L 6–7 | Orosco (6–5) | **Dayley** (3–2) | – | 3:16 | 46,295 | 83–55 | L1 |
| 139 | September 13 | 1:20 p.m. CDT | @ Cubs | **W** 9–3 | **Forsch** (7–6) | Trout (8–5) | **Worrell** (1) | 3:10 | 16,110 | 84–55 | W1 |
| 140 | September 14 | 1:20 p.m. CDT | @ Cubs | **W** 5–4 | **Campbell** (5–3) | Sorensen (5–3) | **Lahti** (17) | 3:05 | 29,852 | 85–55 | W2 |
| 141 | September 15 | 1:20 p.m. CDT | @ Cubs | **W** 5–1 | **Cox** (16–8) | Engel (1–5) | – | 2:58 | 28,430 | 86–55 | W3 |
| 142 (1) | September 16 | 12:35 p.m. CDT | @ Pirates | **W** 8–4 | **Tudor** (19–8) | DeLeón (2–18) | **Worrell** (2) | 3:19 | – | 87–55 | W4 |
| 143 (2) | September 16 | 4:29 p.m. CDT | @ Pirates | **W** 3–1 | **Perry** (1–0) | Clements (0–2) | – | 2:51 | 3,601 | 88–55 | W5 |
| 144 | September 17 | 6:35 p.m. CDT | @ Pirates | **W** 10–4 | **Andújar** (21–9) | Kipper (0–1) | – | 2:56 | 3,924 | 89–55 | W6 |
| 145 | September 18 | 6:35 p.m. CDT | @ Phillies | **W** 7–0 | **Forsch** (8–6) | Denny (11–12) | – | 2:36 | 17,354 | 90–55 | W7 |
| 146 | September 19 | 6:35 p.m. CDT | @ Phillies | L 3–6 | Rucker (3–1) | **Keough** (0–1) | Carman (6) | 2:44 | 17,120 | 90–56 | L1 |
| 147 | September 20 | 7:35 p.m. CDT | Expos | **W** 5–3 | **Worrell** (2–0) | St. Claire (4–3) | – | 2:27 | 33,788 | 91–56 | W1 |
| 148 | September 21 | 12:20 p.m. CDT | Expos | **W** 7–6 | **Lahti** (4–2) | Roberge (3–3) | **Worrell** (3) | 3:00 | 32,788 | 92–56 | W2 |
| 149 | September 22 | 1:15 p.m. CDT | Expos | **W** 6–5 | **Dayley** (4–2) | O'Connor (0–2) | – | 3:09 | 32,958 | 93–56 | W3 |
| 150 | September 23 | 7:35 p.m. CDT | Pirates | **W** 5–4 | **Lahti** (5–2) | Guante (4–6) | **Worrell** (4) | 2:55 | 17,611 | 94–56 | W4 |
| 151 | September 24 | 7:35 p.m. CDT | Pirates | **W** 5–4 | **Horton** (3–2) | Tunnell (4–10) | **Dayley** (11) | 2:56 | 20,054 | 95–56 | W5 |
| 152 | September 25 | 7:35 p.m. CDT | Phillies | **W** 6–3 | **Cox** (17–9) | Hudson (7–13) | **Lahti** (18) | 2:46 | 17,733 | 96–56 | W6 |
| 153 | September 26 | 7:35 p.m. CDT | Phillies | **W** 5–0 | **Tudor** (20–8) | Gross (14–12) | – | 2:19 | 23,598 | 97–56 | W7 |
| — | September 27 | | @ Expos | **Postponed (Rain)** (Makeup date: September 28) | | | | | | | |
| 154 (1) | September 28 | 2:20 p.m. CDT | @ Expos | L 0–2 | Gullickson (14–11) | **Andújar** (21–10) | Reardon (37) | 2:24 | – | 97–57 | L1 |
| 155 (2) | September 28 | 5:19 p.m. CDT | @ Expos | **W** 4–2 (11) | **Worrell** (3–0) | Reardon (2–8) | – | 3:21 | 15,512 | 98–57 | W1 |
| 156 | September 29 | 12:35 p.m. CDT | @ Expos | L 5–7 | Lucas (6–2) | **Dayley** (4–3) | Reardon (38) | 2:40 | 20,577 | 98–58 | L1 |

October: 3–3 (Home: 3–3; Away: 0–0)

| # | Date | Time (CT) | Opponent | Score | Win | Loss | Save | Time of Game | Attendance | Record | Box/ Streak |
|---|---|---|---|---|---|---|---|---|---|---|---|
| 157 | October 1 | 7:35 p.m. CDT | Mets | L 0–1 (11) | Orosco (8–6) | **Dayley** (4–4) | – | 3:22 | 46,026 | 98–59 | L2 |
| 158 | October 2 | 7:35 p.m. CDT | Mets | L 2–5 | Gooden (24–4) | **Andújar** (21–11) | – | 3:07 | 47,333 | 98–60 | L3 |
| 159 | October 3 | 7:35 p.m. CDT | Mets | **W** 4–3 | **Cox** (18–9) | Aguilera (10–7) | **Lahti** (19) | 3:11 | 47,720 | 99–60 | W1 |
| 160 | October 4 | 7:35 p.m. CDT | Cubs | **W** 4–2 | **Forsch** (9–6) | Eckersley (11–7) | **Worrell** (5) | 2:21 | 40,618 | 100–60 | W2 |
| 161 | October 5 | 1:15 p.m. CDT | Cubs | **W** 7–1 | **Tudor** (21–8) | Trout (9–7) | – | 2:20 | 44,825 | 101–60 | W3 |
| 162 | October 6 | 1:15 p.m. CDT | Cubs | L 2–8 | Patterson (3–0) | **Andújar** (21–12) | – | 2:20 | 43,665 | 101–61 | L1 |

*An MLB Players strike forced the cancellation of all regular season games on August 6 and 7. Most games were made up later in the season.
Legend: = Win = Loss = Postponement = Clinched
Bold = Cardinals team member

=== Postseason Game log ===
1985 Postseason game log: 7–6 (Home: 4–2; Away: 3–4)
NL Championship Series: vs. Los Angeles Dodgers 4–2 (Home: 3–0; Away: 1–2)

| # | Date | Time (CT) | Opponent | Score | Win | Loss | Save | Time of Game | Attendance | Series | Box/ Streak |
|---|---|---|---|---|---|---|---|---|---|---|---|
| 1 | October 9 | 7:30 p.m. CDT | @ Dodgers | L 1–4 | Valenzuela (1–0) | **Tudor** (0–1) | Niedenfuer (1) | 2:42 | 55,270 | LA 1–0 | L1 |
| 2 | October 10 | 7:35 p.m. CDT | @ Dodgers | L 2–8 | Hershiser (1–0) | **Andújar** (0–1) | – | 3:04 | 52,222 | LA 2–0 | L2 |
| 3 | October 12 | 12:05 p.m. CDT | Dodgers | **W** 4–2 | **Cox** (1–0) | Welch (0–1) | **Dayley** (1) | 3:21 | 53,708 | LA 2–1 | W1 |
| 4 | October 13 | 7:15 p.m. CDT | Dodgers | **W** 12–2 | **Tudor** (1–1) | Reuss (0–1) | – | 2:47 | 53,708 | Tied 2–2 | W2 |
| 5 | October 14 | 2:05 p.m. CDT | Dodgers | **W** 3–2 | **Lahti** (1–0) | Niedenfuer (0–1) | – | 2:56 | 53,708 | STL 3–2 | W3 |
| 6 | October 16 | 2:05 p.m. CDT | @ Dodgers | **W** 7–5 | **Worrell** (1–0) | Niedenfuer (0–2) | **Dayley** (2) | 3:32 | 55,208 | STL 4–2 | W4 |

World Series: vs. Kansas City Royals 3–4 (Home: 1–2; Away: 2–2)

| # | Date | Time (CT) | Opponent | Score | Win | Loss | Save | Time of Game | Attendance | Series | Box/ Streak |
|---|---|---|---|---|---|---|---|---|---|---|---|
| 1 | October 19 | 7:35 p.m. CDT | @ Royals | **W** 3–1 | **Tudor** (1–0) | Jackson (0–1) | **Worrell** (1) | 2:48 | 41,650 | STL 1–0 | W1 |
| 2 | October 20 | 7:30 p.m. CDT | @ Royals | **W** 4–2 | **Dayley** (1–0) | Leibrandt (0–1) | **Lahti** (1) | 2:44 | 41,656 | STL 2–0 | W2 |
| 3 | October 22 | 7:35 p.m. CDT | Royals | L 1–6 | Saberhagen (1–0) | **Andújar** (0–1) | – | 2:59 | 53,634 | STL 2–1 | L1 |
| 4 | October 23 | 7:25 p.m. CDT | Royals | **W** 3–0 | **Tudor** (2–0) | Black (0–1) | – | 2:19 | 53,634 | STL 3–1 | W1 |
| 5 | October 24 | 7:25 p.m. CDT | Royals | L 1–6 | Jackson (1–1) | **Forsch** (0–1) | – | 2:52 | 53,634 | STL 3–2 | L1 |
| 6 | October 26 | 7:25 p.m. CDT | @ Royals | L 1–2 | Quisenberry (1–0) | **Worrell** (0–1) | – | 2:47 | 41,628 | Tied 3–3 | L2 |
| 7 | October 27 | 7:30 p.m. CST | @ Royals | L 0–11 | Saberhagen (2–0) | **Tudor** (2–1) | – | 2:46 | 41,658 | KC 4–3 | L3 |

Legend: = Win = Loss = Postponement
Bold = Cardinals team member

== Starting Lineups ==
=== Regular Season ===
==== Batting Order ====
1985 Regular Season Batting Order game log
April

| # | Date | Opponent | 1st | 2nd | 3rd | 4th | 5th | 6th | 7th | 8th | 9th |
|---|---|---|---|---|---|---|---|---|---|---|---|
| 19 | April 30 | LA | | | | | | | | | |

May

| # | Date | Opponent | 1st | 2nd | 3rd | 4th | 5th | 6th | 7th | 8th | 9th |
|---|---|---|---|---|---|---|---|---|---|---|---|
| 20 | May 1 | LA | | | | | | | | | |
| 26 | May 8 | @ LA | | | | | | | | | |
| 27 | May 9 | @ LA | | | | | | | | | |

June

| # | Date | Opponent | 1st | 2nd | 3rd | 4th | 5th | 6th | 7th | 8th | 9th |

July

| # | Date | Opponent | 1st | 2nd | 3rd | 4th | 5th | 6th | 7th | 8th | 9th |
|---|---|---|---|---|---|---|---|---|---|---|---|
| 75 | July 4 | LA | | | | | | | | | |
| 76 | July 5 | LA | | | | | | | | | |
| 77 | July 6 | LA | | | | | | | | | |
| 78 | July 7 | LA | | | | | | | | | |
| 86 | July 18 | @ LA | | | | | | | | | |
| 87 | July 19 | @ LA | | | | | | | | | |
| 88 | July 20 | @ LA | | | | | | | | | |
| 89 | July 21 | @ LA | | | | | | | | | |

August

| # | Date | Opponent | 1st | 2nd | 3rd | 4th | 5th | 6th | 7th | 8th | 9th |

September

| # | Date | Opponent | 1st | 2nd | 3rd | 4th | 5th | 6th | 7th | 8th | 9th |

October

| # | Date | Opponent | 1st | 2nd | 3rd | 4th | 5th | 6th | 7th | 8th | 9th |

==== Defensive Lineup ====
1985 Regular Season Defensive Lineup game log
April

| # | Date | Opponent | C | 1B | 2B | 3B | SS | LF | CF | RF | P |
|---|---|---|---|---|---|---|---|---|---|---|---|
| 19 | April 30 | LA | | | | | | | | | |

May

| # | Date | Opponent | C | 1B | 2B | 3B | SS | LF | CF | RF | P |
|---|---|---|---|---|---|---|---|---|---|---|---|
| 20 | May 1 | LA | | | | | | | | | |
| 26 | May 8 | @ LA | | | | | | | | | |
| 27 | May 9 | @ LA | | | | | | | | | |

June

| # | Date | Opponent | C | 1B | 2B | 3B | SS | LF | CF | RF | P |

July

| # | Date | Opponent | C | 1B | 2B | 3B | SS | LF | CF | RF | P |
|---|---|---|---|---|---|---|---|---|---|---|---|
| 75 | July 4 | LA | | | | | | | | | |
| 76 | July 5 | LA | | | | | | | | | |
| 77 | July 6 | LA | | | | | | | | | |
| 78 | July 7 | LA | | | | | | | | | |
| 86 | July 18 | @ LA | | | | | | | | | |
| 87 | July 19 | @ LA | | | | | | | | | |
| 88 | July 20 | @ LA | | | | | | | | | |
| 89 | July 21 | @ LA | | | | | | | | | |

August

| # | Date | Opponent | C | 1B | 2B | 3B | SS | LF | CF | RF | P |

September

| # | Date | Opponent | C | 1B | 2B | 3B | SS | LF | CF | RF | P |

October

| # | Date | Opponent | C | 1B | 2B | 3B | SS | LF | CF | RF | P |

=== Postseason ===
==== Batting Order ====
1985 Postseason Batting Order game log
NL Championship Series: vs. Los Angeles Dodgers

| # | Date | Opponent | 1st | 2nd | 3rd | 4th | 5th | 6th | 7th | 8th | 9th |
|---|---|---|---|---|---|---|---|---|---|---|---|
| 1 | October 9 | @ LA | | | | | | | | | |
| 2 | October 10 | @ LA | | | | | | | | | |
| 3 | October 12 | LA | | | | | | | | | |
| 4 | October 13 | LA | | | | | | | | | |
| 5 | October 14 | LA | | | | | | | | | |
| 6 | October 16 | @ LA | | | | | | | | | |

World Series: vs. Kansas City Royals

| # | Date | Opponent | 1st | 2nd | 3rd | 4th | 5th | 6th | 7th | 8th | 9th |
|---|---|---|---|---|---|---|---|---|---|---|---|
| 1 | October 19 | @ KC | | | | | | | | | |
| 2 | October 20 | @ KC | | | | | | | | | |
| 3 | October 22 | KC | | | | | | | | | |
| 4 | October 23 | KC | | | | | | | | | |
| 5 | October 24 | KC | | | | | | | | | |
| 6 | October 26 | @ KC | | | | | | | | | |
| 7 | October 27 | @ KC | | | | | | | | | |

==== Defensive Lineup ====
1985 Postseason Defensive Lineup game log
NL Championship Series: vs. Los Angeles Dodgers

| # | Date | Opponent | C | 1B | 2B | 3B | SS | LF | CF | RF | P |
|---|---|---|---|---|---|---|---|---|---|---|---|
| 1 | October 9 | @ LA | | | | | | | | | |
| 2 | October 10 | @ LA | | | | | | | | | |
| 3 | October 12 | LA | | | | | | | | | |
| 4 | October 13 | LA | | | | | | | | | |
| 5 | October 14 | LA | | | | | | | | | |
| 6 | October 16 | @ LA | | | | | | | | | |

World Series: vs. Kansas City Royals

| # | Date | Opponent | C | 1B | 2B | 3B | SS | LF | CF | RF | P |
|---|---|---|---|---|---|---|---|---|---|---|---|
| 1 | October 19 | @ KC | | | | | | | | | |
| 2 | October 20 | @ KC | | | | | | | | | |
| 3 | October 22 | KC | | | | | | | | | |
| 4 | October 23 | KC | | | | | | | | | |
| 5 | October 24 | KC | | | | | | | | | |
| 6 | October 26 | @ KC | | | | | | | | | |
| 7 | October 27 | @ KC | | | | | | | | | |

== Game Umpires ==
=== Regular Season ===
1985 Regular Season Umpire game log
April

| # | Date | Opponent | HP | 1B | 2B | 3B |
|---|---|---|---|---|---|---|
| 19 | April 30 | LA | #10; John McSherry | #25; Charlie Williams | #30; Randy Marsh | #24; Billy Williams (crew chief) |

May

| # | Date | Opponent | HP | 1B | 2B | 3B |
|---|---|---|---|---|---|---|
| 20 | May 1 | LA | #25; Charlie Williams | #30; Randy Marsh | #24; Billy Williams (crew chief) | #10; John McSherry |
| 26 | May 8 | @ LA | #12; Gerry Davis | #21; Harry Wendelstedt (crew chief) | #19; Terry Tata | #2; Jerry Crawford |
| 27 | May 9 | @ LA | #21; Harry Wendelstedt (crew chief) | #19; Terry Tata | #2; Jerry Crawford | #12; Gerry Davis |

June

| # | Date | Opponent | HP | 1B | 2B | 3B |

July

| # | Date | Opponent | HP | 1B | 2B | 3B |
|---|---|---|---|---|---|---|
| 75 | July 4 | LA | #17; Paul Runge | #5; Bob Engel (crew chief) | #27; Steve Rippley | #26; Dave Pallone |
| 76 | July 5 | LA | #5; Bob Engel (crew chief) | #27; Steve Rippley | #26; Dave Pallone | #17; Paul Runge |
| 77 | July 6 | LA | #27; Steve Rippley | #26; Dave Pallone | #17; Paul Runge | #5; Bob Engel (crew chief) |
| 78 | July 7 | LA | #26; Dave Pallone | #17; Paul Runge | #5; Bob Engel (crew chief) | #27; Steve Rippley |
| 86 | July 18 | @ LA | #26; Dave Pallone | #17; Paul Runge | #5; Bob Engel (crew chief) | #15; Jim Quick |
| 87 | July 19 | @ LA | #17; Paul Runge | #5; Bob Engel (crew chief) | #15; Jim Quick | #26; Dave Pallone |
| 88 | July 20 | @ LA | #5; Bob Engel (crew chief) | #15; Jim Quick | #26; Dave Pallone | #17; Paul Runge |
| 89 | July 21 | @ LA | #15; Jim Quick | #26; Dave Pallone | #17; Paul Runge | #5; Bob Engel (crew chief) |

August

| # | Date | Opponent | HP | 1B | 2B | 3B |

September

| # | Date | Opponent | HP | 1B | 2B | 3B |

October

| # | Date | Opponent | HP | 1B | 2B | 3B |

=== Postseason ===
1985 Postseason Umpire game log
NL Championship Series: vs. Los Angeles Dodgers

| # | Date | Opponent | HP | 1B | 2B | 3B | LF | RF |
|---|---|---|---|---|---|---|---|---|
| 1 | October 9 | @ LA | #18; Dick Stello (crew chief) | #6; Bruce Froemming | #10; John McSherry | #19; Terry Tata | #17; Paul Runge | #2; Jerry Crawford |
| 2 | October 10 | @ LA | #6; Bruce Froemming | #10; John McSherry | #19; Terry Tata | #2; Jerry Crawford | #18; Dick Stello (crew chief) | #17; Paul Runge |
| 3 | October 12 | LA | #10; John McSherry | #19; Terry Tata | #17; Paul Runge | #2; Jerry Crawford | #18; Dick Stello (crew chief) | #6; Bruce Froemming |
| 4 | October 13 | LA | #19; Terry Tata | #17; Paul Runge | #2; Jerry Crawford | #18; Dick Stello (crew chief) | #6; Bruce Froemming | #10; John McSherry |
| 5 | October 14 | LA | #17; Paul Runge | #2; Jerry Crawford | #18; Dick Stello (crew chief) | #6; Bruce Froemming | #10; John McSherry | #19; Terry Tata |
| 6 | October 16 | @ LA | #2; Jerry Crawford | #18; Dick Stello (crew chief) | #6; Bruce Froemming | #10; John McSherry | #19; Terry Tata | #17; Paul Runge |

World Series: vs. Kansas City Royals

| # | Date | Opponent | HP | 1B | 2B | 3B | LF | RF |
|---|---|---|---|---|---|---|---|---|
| 1 | October 19 | @ KC | #11; Don Denkinger (AL) (crew chief) | #24; Billy Williams (NL) | #8; Jim McKean (AL) | #5; Bob Engel (NL) | #29; John Shulock (AL) | #15; Jim Quick (NL) |
| 2 | October 20 | @ KC | #24; Billy Williams (NL) | #8; Jim McKean (AL) | #5; Bob Engel (NL) | #29; John Shulock (AL) | #15; Jim Quick (NL) | #11; Don Denkinger (AL) (crew chief) |
| 3 | October 22 | KC | #8; Jim McKean (AL) | #5; Bob Engel (NL) | #29; John Shulock (AL) | #15; Jim Quick (NL) | #11; Don Denkinger (AL) (crew chief) | #24; Billy Williams (NL) |
| 4 | October 23 | KC | #5; Bob Engel (NL) | #29; John Shulock (AL) | #15; Jim Quick (NL) | #11; Don Denkinger (AL) (crew chief) | #24; Billy Williams (NL) | #8; Jim McKean (AL) |
| 5 | October 24 | KC | #29; John Shulock (AL) | #15; Jim Quick (NL) | #11; Don Denkinger (AL) (crew chief) | #24; Billy Williams (NL) | #8; Jim McKean (AL) | #5; Bob Engel (NL) |
| 6 | October 26 | @ KC | #15; Jim Quick (NL) | #11; Don Denkinger (AL) (crew chief) | #24; Billy Williams (NL) | #8; Jim McKean (AL) | #5; Bob Engel (NL) | #29; John Shulock (AL) |
| 7 | October 27 | @ KC | #11; Don Denkinger (AL) (crew chief) | #24; Billy Williams (NL) | #8; Jim McKean (AL) | #5; Bob Engel (NL) | #29; John Shulock (AL) | #15; Jim Quick (NL) |

== Player stats ==
| = Indicates team leader |

| = Indicates league leader |

=== Batting ===
==== Starters by position ====
Note: Pos = position; G = Games played; AB = At bats; H = Hits; Avg. = Batting average; HR = Home runs; RBI = Runs batted in

| Pos | Player | G | AB | H | Avg. | HR | RBI |
|---|---|---|---|---|---|---|---|
| C | Tom Nieto | 95 | 253 | 57 | .225 | 0 | 34 |
| 1B | Jack Clark | 126 | 442 | 124 | .281 | 22 | 87 |
| 2B | Tom Herr | 159 | 596 | 180 | .302 | 8 | 110 |
| SS | Ozzie Smith | 158 | 537 | 148 | .276 | 6 | 54 |
| 3B | Terry Pendleton | 149 | 559 | 134 | .240 | 5 | 69 |
| LF | Vince Coleman | 151 | 636 | 170 | .267 | 1 | 40 |
| CF | Willie McGee | 152 | 612 | 216 | .353 | 10 | 82 |
| RF | Andy Van Slyke | 146 | 424 | 110 | .259 | 13 | 55 |

==== Other batters ====
Note: G = Games played; AB = At bats; H = Hits; Avg. = Batting average; HR = Home runs; RBI = Runs batted in

| Player | G | AB | H | Avg. | HR | RBI |
|---|---|---|---|---|---|---|
| Darrell Porter | 84 | 240 | 53 | .221 | 10 | 36 |
| Tito Landrum | 85 | 161 | 45 | .280 | 4 | 21 |
| Mike Jorgensen | 72 | 112 | 22 | .196 | 0 | 11 |
| Lonnie Smith | 28 | 96 | 25 | .260 | 0 | 7 |
| César Cedeño | 28 | 76 | 33 | .434 | 6 | 19 |
| Iván DeJesús | 59 | 72 | 16 | .222 | 0 | 7 |
| Steve Braun | 64 | 67 | 16 | .239 | 1 | 6 |
| Tom Lawless | 47 | 58 | 12 | .207 | 0 | 8 |
| Brian Harper | 43 | 52 | 13 | .250 | 0 | 8 |
| Mike LaValliere | 12 | 34 | 5 | .147 | 0 | 6 |
| Randy Hunt | 14 | 19 | 3 | .158 | 0 | 1 |
| Curt Ford | 11 | 12 | 6 | .500 | 0 | 3 |
| Art Howe | 4 | 3 | 0 | .000 | 0 | 0 |

=== Pitching ===
==== Starting pitchers ====
Note: G = Games pitched; IP = Innings pitched; W = Wins; L = Losses; ERA = Earned run average; SO = Strikeouts

| Player | G | IP | W | L | ERA | SO |
|---|---|---|---|---|---|---|
| John Tudor | 36 | 275.0 | 21 | 8 | 1.93 | 169 |
| Joaquín Andújar | 38 | 269.2 | 21 | 12 | 3.40 | 112 |
| Danny Cox | 35 | 241.0 | 18 | 9 | 2.88 | 131 |
| Kurt Kepshire | 32 | 153.1 | 10 | 9 | 4.75 | 67 |

==== Other pitchers ====
Note: G = Games pitched; IP = Innings pitched; W = Wins; L = Losses; SV = Saves; ERA = Earned run average; SO = Strikeouts

| Player | G | IP | W | L | SV | ERA | SO |
|---|---|---|---|---|---|---|---|
| Bob Forsch | 34 | 136.0 | 9 | 6 | 2 | 3.90 | 48 |
| Matt Keough | 4 | 10.0 | 0 | 1 | 0 | 4.50 | 10 |

==== Relief pitchers ====
Note: G = Games pitched; IP = Innings pitched; W = Wins; L = Losses; SV = Saves; ERA = Earned run average; SO = Strikeouts

| Player | G | IP | W | L | SV | ERA | SO |
|---|---|---|---|---|---|---|---|
| Jeff Lahti | 52 | 68.1 | 5 | 2 | 19 | 1.84 | 41 |
| Ken Dayley | 57 | 65.1 | 4 | 4 | 11 | 2.76 | 62 |
| Ricky Horton | 49 | 89.2 | 3 | 2 | 1 | 2.91 | 59 |
| Bill Campbell | 50 | 64.1 | 5 | 3 | 4 | 3.50 | 41 |
| Neil Allen | 23 | 29.0 | 1 | 4 | 2 | 5.59 | 10 |
| Todd Worrell | 17 | 21.2 | 3 | 0 | 5 | 2.91 | 17 |
| Joe Boever | 13 | 16.1 | 0 | 0 | 0 | 4.41 | 20 |
| Pat Perry | 6 | 12.1 | 1 | 0 | 0 | 0.00 | 6 |
| Andy Hassler | 10 | 10.0 | 0 | 1 | 0 | 1.80 | 5 |
| Doug Bair | 2 | 2.0 | 0 | 0 | 0 | 0.00 | 0 |

== NLCS ==
The NLCS against the Dodgers featured two game-winning home runs by shortstop Ozzie Smith in Game 5 and first baseman Jack Clark in Game 6, both off Dodgers reliever Tom Niedenfuer. In a rare display of power-hitting, Smith hit his in walk-off fashion in the bottom of the ninth inning, prompting the famous call of "Go crazy, folks! Go crazy!" by Jack Buck. This play is considered one of the key highlights in all of Cardinals' history.

=== Game 1 ===
Wednesday, October 9 at Dodger Stadium (Los Angeles)

| Team | 1 | 2 | 3 | 4 | 5 | 6 | 7 | 8 | 9 | R | H | E |
|---|---|---|---|---|---|---|---|---|---|---|---|---|
| St. Louis | 0 | 0 | 0 | 0 | 0 | 0 | 1 | 0 | 0 | 1 | 8 | 1 |
| Los Angeles | 0 | 0 | 0 | 1 | 0 | 3 | 0 | 0 | X | 4 | 8 | 0 |
W: Fernando Valenzuela (1–0) L: John Tudor (0–1) SV: Tom Niedenfuer (1)
HRs: LAD – None STL – None

=== Game 2 ===
Thursday, October 10 at Dodger Stadium (Los Angeles)

| Team | 1 | 2 | 3 | 4 | 5 | 6 | 7 | 8 | 9 | R | H | E |
|---|---|---|---|---|---|---|---|---|---|---|---|---|
| St. Louis | 0 | 0 | 1 | 0 | 0 | 0 | 0 | 0 | 1 | 2 | 8 | 1 |
| Los Angeles | 0 | 0 | 3 | 2 | 1 | 2 | 0 | 0 | X | 8 | 13 | 1 |
W: Orel Hershiser (1–0) L: Joaquín Andújar (0–1) SV: None
HRs: LAD – Greg Brock (1) STL – None

=== Game 3 ===
Saturday, October 12 at Busch Stadium (St. Louis)

| Team | 1 | 2 | 3 | 4 | 5 | 6 | 7 | 8 | 9 | R | H | E |
|---|---|---|---|---|---|---|---|---|---|---|---|---|
| Los Angeles | 0 | 0 | 0 | 1 | 0 | 0 | 1 | 0 | 0 | 2 | 7 | 2 |
| St. Louis | 2 | 2 | 0 | 0 | 0 | 0 | 0 | 0 | X | 4 | 8 | 0 |
W: Danny Cox (1–0) L: Bob Welch (0–1) SV: Ken Dayley (1)
HRs: LAD – None STL – Tom Herr (1)

=== Game 4 ===
Sunday, October 13 at Busch Stadium (St. Louis)

| Team | 1 | 2 | 3 | 4 | 5 | 6 | 7 | 8 | 9 | R | H | E |
|---|---|---|---|---|---|---|---|---|---|---|---|---|
| Los Angeles | 0 | 0 | 0 | 0 | 0 | 0 | 1 | 1 | 0 | 2 | 5 | 1 |
| St. Louis | 0 | 9 | 0 | 1 | 1 | 0 | 0 | 1 | X | 12 | 15 | 0 |
W: John Tudor (1–0) L: Jerry Reuss (0–1) SV: None
HRs: LAD – Bill Madlock (1) STL – None

=== Game 5 ===
Monday, October 14 at Busch Stadium (St. Louis)

| Team | 1 | 2 | 3 | 4 | 5 | 6 | 7 | 8 | 9 | R | H | E |
|---|---|---|---|---|---|---|---|---|---|---|---|---|
| Los Angeles | 0 | 0 | 0 | 2 | 0 | 0 | 0 | 0 | 0 | 2 | 5 | 1 |
| St. Louis | 2 | 0 | 0 | 0 | 0 | 0 | 0 | 0 | 1 | 3 | 5 | 1 |
W: Jeff Lahti (1–0) L: Tom Niedenfuer (0–1) SV: None
HRs: LAD – Bill Madlock (2) STL – Ozzie Smith (1)

=== Game 6 ===
Wednesday, October 16 at Dodger Stadium (Los Angeles)

| Team | 1 | 2 | 3 | 4 | 5 | 6 | 7 | 8 | 9 | R | H | E |
|---|---|---|---|---|---|---|---|---|---|---|---|---|
| St. Louis | 0 | 0 | 1 | 0 | 0 | 0 | 3 | 0 | 3 | 7 | 12 | 1 |
| Los Angeles | 1 | 1 | 0 | 0 | 2 | 0 | 0 | 1 | 0 | 5 | 8 | 0 |
W: Todd Worrell (1–0) L: Tom Niedenfuer (0–2) SV: Ken Dayley (2)
HRs: LAD – Bill Madlock (3) Mike Marshall (1) STL – Jack Clark (1)

== World Series ==
The 1985 World Series was christened the "I-70 Series" and the "Show-Me Series" because it featured the in-state rival Kansas City Royals, the first time the two teams met in a non-exhibition setting. It also featured some of the most controversial series of events in Cardinals history. Coleman was unable to play in this Series due to an injury sustained in the NLCS after being rolled up in the mechanical tarpaulin at Busch Stadium. Scribes remarked about the "killer tarp", but it proved metaphorical.

After St. Louis gained a 3–2 series advantage, Game 6 tipped off the controversy with "The Call". With the Cardinals leading 1–0 in the bottom of the ninth inning, umpire Don Denkinger called Royals batter Jorge Orta safe at first base — a call refuted by broadcast television's instant replay. Several batters later, they lost Game 6 by the score of 2–1. After "The Call", St. Louis proceeded to lose Game 7 by a score of 11–0, and the Series as well. Despite both of their pitching aces participating in this game, they failed to come through — starter John Tudor, who had won his two prior starts in the Series, punched a mechanical fan when removed from the game. His severely cut pitching hand required stitching at a Kansas City hospital while the game was ongoing. Joaquín Andújar, the other ace pressed into relief, was ejected by home plate umpire Denkinger for arguing balls and strikes.

AL Kansas City Royals (4) vs. NL St. Louis Cardinals (3)

| Game | Score | Date | Location | Attendance | Time of Game |
|---|---|---|---|---|---|
| 1 | Cardinals – 3, Royals – 1 | October 19 | Royals Stadium (Kansas City) | 41,650 | 2:48 |
| 2 | Cardinals – 4, Royals – 2 | October 20 | Royals Stadium (Kansas City) | 41,656 | 2:44 |
| 3 | Royals – 6, Cardinals – 1 | October 22 | Busch Stadium (St. Louis) | 53,634 | 3:00 |
| 4 | Royals – 0, Cardinals – 3 | October 23 | Busch Stadium (St. Louis) | 53,634 | 2:19 |
| 5 | Royals – 6, Cardinals – 1 | October 24 | Busch Stadium (St. Louis) | 53,634 | 2:52 |
| 6 | Cardinals – 1, Royals – 2 | October 26 | Royals Stadium (Kansas City) | 41,628 | 2:48 |
| 7 | Cardinals – 0, Royals – 11 | October 27 | Royals Stadium (Kansas City) | 41,658 | 2:46 |

== Awards and honors ==
- Vince Coleman, National League Rookie of the Year Award
- Vince Coleman, Major League Baseball Stolen Base Leader (110)
- Whitey Herzog, Associated Press Manager of the Year
- Ozzie Smith, Shortstop, Golden Glove Award
- Willie McGee, Outfield, Golden Glove Award

== Farm system ==
| Level | Team | League | Manager |
|---|---|---|---|
| AAA | Louisville Redbirds | American Association | Jim Fregosi |
| AA | Arkansas Travelers | Texas League | Jim Riggleman |
| A | St. Petersburg Cardinals | Florida State League | Dave Bialas |
| A | Springfield Cardinals | Midwest League | Lloyd Merritt |
| A | Savannah Cardinals | South Atlantic League | Gaylen Pitts |
| A-Short Season | Erie Cardinals | New York–Penn League | Fred Koenig |
| Rookie | Johnson City Cardinals | Appalachian League | Rich Hacker |

LEAGUE CHAMPIONS: Louisville
