= Springfield Cardinals (Illinois) =

- 1982–1993; Springfield, Illinois

Minor league affiliations
- Class: Class A (1982–1993)
- League: Midwest League (1982–1993)
- Division: Central Division (1982); Southern Division (1983–1993)

Major league affiliations
- Team: St. Louis Cardinals (1982–1993)

Minor league titles
- League titles: None
- Conference titles: 1986; 1987
- Division titles (5): 1982; 1983; 1984; 1986; 1987
- First-half titles: 1993
- Second-half titles: 1988; 1989

Team data
- Name: Springfield Cardinals (1982–1993)
- Ballpark: Lanphier Park (1982–1993)

The Springfield Cardinals were a minor league baseball team located in Springfield, Illinois. The Springfield Cardinals played in the Midwest League from 1982 to 1993 and were an affiliate of the St. Louis Cardinals. The team played at Lanphier Park on the northside of Springfield.

Affectionately known as the "Baby Birds", their chief rival was the Peoria Chiefs, then an affiliate of the Cubs. The declining condition of Lanphier Park, last renovated in 1978, led to the relocation of the franchise to Madison, Wisconsin for the 1994 season, where they were known as the Madison Hatters. The Hatters, in turn, moved to Battle Creek, Michigan to become the Michigan Battle Cats. While playing in Battle Creek, the franchise became the Battle Creek Yankees and the Southwest Michigan Devil Rays before moving to Midland, Michigan where they now play as the Great Lakes Loons.

The Cardinals were generally successful, finishing with a winning record in nine of their 12 seasons. In post-season play they were less successful, as they lost four times in the first round of the league's two-round, four-team playoffs and lost in the championship round in their other four appearances. The league's records, however, recognize both the winner of the postseason playoffs and the team with the highest overall season record as champions, and the Cardinals led the league in regular season play twice, in 1986 and 1987. Their overall record during their 12 seasons in Springfield was 917–743, for a .552 winning percentage.

The team also helped develop more than 50 players who advanced to Major League Baseball. Among the young Springfield players who went on to successful major league careers were Bernard Gilkey, Ray Lankford, Jeff Fassero, Dmitri Young, and Todd Zeile.

== History of baseball in Springfield ==
Minor league baseball has a long history in Springfield, Illinois. Springfield fielded a team in the 1883 Northwestern League, which has traditionally been considered the first minor league. The Springfield Senators also played in the Central Interstate League in 1889, the Western Association in 1895, the Central League in 1900, and the Mississippi Valley League in 1933. Their longest minor league affiliation was with the Illinois–Indiana–Iowa League or "Three-I League"(1903–1914, 1925–1932, 1935, 1938–1942, and 1946–1949).

In 1948, Springfield hosted a team in the All-American Girls Professional Baseball League, the Springfield Sallies. They finished the season in last place with a 41–84 record.

The original Springfield Capitals baseball team played in Springfield from 1963 to 1977 in the Central Illinois Collegiate League. Springfield also hosted another Central Illinois Collegiate League team with the nickname Rifles from 1983 to 2006.

Springfield experienced its highest level of minor league baseball during 1978–1981, when it hosted the Springfield Redbirds of the Class Triple-A American Association. The Redbirds, a St. Louis Cardinals affiliate, won the playoff for the league championship in 1980. The Redbirds' move to Louisville in 1982 was the impetus for the Springfield Cardinals entering the Midwest League as an expansion franchise during the 1982 season and playing until 1993.

When the Springfield Cardinals moved to Madison in 1994, the Midwest League's Waterloo Diamonds moved to Springfield and became the Springfield Sultans. The Sultans were affiliated with the San Diego Padres in 1994 and with the Kansas City Royals in 1995. In 1995 the Sultans moved to Lansing, Michigan, where they became today's Lansing Lugnuts.

After the departure of the Sultans, independent league baseball came to Springfield with the second version of the Springfield Capitals of the Frontier League, who played from 1996 to 2001. Since 2008, baseball is represented in Springfield by the amateur Springfield Sliders of the wood-bat Prospect League. Until it was sold to Capital City Baseball in 2021 and rebranded as the Springfield Lucky Horseshoes in February 2022.

== Team history ==
=== 1982 to 1987 ===
The Springfield Cardinals arrived in the Midwest League in 1982 as one of four expansion teams, as the league increased from eight teams to 12. The Springfield team was owned by the St. Louis Cardinals organization and was their second Class A affiliate; they retained an affiliation with the Gastonia Cardinals of the South Atlantic League.

The first season of the Springfield Cardinals began auspiciously as they won the Midwest League's Central Division with an 83–53 record, 13 1/2 games ahead of the second place Beloit Brewers. The league championship was determined by a two-round, four-team playoff among the winners of the three divisions plus a wild-card team. In the first round of the postseason playoffs, the Cardinals fell to the Appleton Foxes two games to none. Their playing manager was Dave Bialas, and outfielder Alan Hunsinger led the league with 102 runs batted in. Future major leaguer Danny Cox pitched in 15 games, going 5–3 with a 2.56 earned run average (ERA) and 68 strikeouts in 84 1/3 innings.

In 1983, Springfield won the Southern Division with an 80–59 record, nine games ahead of the Burlington Rangers. In the playoffs, they defeated the Cedar Rapids Reds two games to none, but then fell to the Appleton Foxes in the championship round three games to one. The Cardinals' roster featured catcher Bob Geren, who hit .265 with 24 home runs, and pitcher Pat Perry, who appeared in six games with a 1–1 record and a 2.22 ERA. Outfielder Curt Ford won the league's Most Valuable Player Award, hitting .290 with 20 home runs and a league leading 91 runs batted in.

In 1984, Springfield again won the Southern Division, posting a 70–69 record that placed them four games ahead of the second place Peoria Chiefs. In post-season play they beat the Beloit Brewers two games to none, but again fell to the Appleton Foxes in the championship three games to two. Joseph Rigoli replaced Bialas as manager. The roster included catcher Tom Pagnozzi, who hit .283 with 10 home runs, and third baseman Jim Lindeman, who hit .271 with 18 home runs. On August 8, John Martin pitched the team's first no hitter against the Wausau Timbers, winning 2–0.

The next season, the Cardinals had their first losing record, finishing 66–74 and tied for second place in the Southern Division, nine games behind the Peoria Chiefs. Lloyd Merritt took over as manager, and their roster included pitchers Jeff Fassero, who went 4–8 with a 4.01 ERA, and Mike Hartley (2–7, 5.12). Harry McCulla led the league in hitting with a .317 batting average.

In 1986 they returned to first place in the Southern Division and posted the best record in league, 87–53. Gaylen Pitts took over as manager and was named Manager of the Year. In the playoffs, Springfield fell to the Peoria Chiefs in the first round, two games to none. Craig Wilson played second base and hit .274 with one home run. Pitcher Jeff Oyster led the league in wins with a 17–7 record.

In 1987, the Cardinals had their best season, posting a 94–46 record that was 23 games ahead of the Peoria Chiefs, who finished second in the Southern Division, and 12 games ahead of the second best team in the league, the Kenosha Twins. In the first round of the playoffs, they beat the Clinton Giants two games to one, but they again fell short in the championship, losing to Kenosha three games to one. Pitts was again at the helm, and Todd Zeile (then a Springfield catcher) won the Most Valuable Player Award (which he shared with Greg Vaughn of the Beloit Brewers), hitting .292 with 25 home runs and a league leading 106 runs batted in. Pitcher Bob Faron led the league in wins with a 19–2 record while recording a 2.14 ERA, and Mike Pérez posted a 6–2 record and 0.85 ERA in 84 1/3 innings as a relief pitcher.

=== 1988 to 1993 ===
In 1988, the Midwest League expanded to 14 teams and switched a split-season format with two divisions, with the first- and second-half winners appearing in the first round of the playoffs. Springfield placed fifth in the Southern Division in the first half with a 32–37 record, but won the second half with a 49–21 record. In the first round of the playoffs, they fell to the Cedar Rapids Reds, two games to none. Their manager was Mark DeJohn and their roster included outfielders Bernard Gilkey, who hit .244 with six home runs, and Ray Lankford, who hit .284 with 11 home runs.

The next season, Dan Radison took the reins as manager. Springfield again won the Southern Division's second half, this time with a 41–27 record, after placing fourth in the first half with a 32–35 record. In the postseason playoffs they defeated Cedar Rapids in the first round, two games to none, before falling to the South Bend White Sox three games to none in the championship round.

In 1990 the Cardinals experienced their second losing season, placing fifth in the division in the first half with a 32–38 record and sixth in the second half with a 31–38 record. The following season was the team's worst performance, as they finished the first half in last place at 28–39 and the second half in fifth place at 30–40.

In 1992, the Cardinals returned to winning, finishing the season with an 84–56 overall record that was the second best in the league. However, they were unable to win their division in either half, as their 42–28 record in the first half placed them third, while an identical 42–28 record in the second half was good for second place. Thus, they missed out on the playoffs for the third season in a row. Rick Colbert was manager and their roster included outfielder John Mabry, who hit .268 with 11 home runs, third baseman Dmitri Young, who hit .310 with 14 home runs, and pitcher Doug Creek, who went 4–1 with a 2.61 ERA.

In 1993, the Cardinals won the first half title in the Southern Division with a 41–26 record. In the second half their 37–32 record placed them in second place, seven games behind the Clinton Giants. Facing the Giants in the first round of the playoffs, they fell two games to none in what would be their final Midwest League games. Their roster included T. J. Mathews, who went 12–9 with a 2.72 ERA, and John Frascatore, who went 7–12 with a 3.78 ERA. On August 13, Mathews pitched the Cardinals' second, and last, no hitter, shutting out the Burlington Bees 4–0. Second baseman Joe Biasucci won the league's Most Valuable Player Award after hitting .289 and leading the league in home runs with 26.

Attendance dropped to 110,189 in 1993 (compared to 175,017 in 1991), and the St. Louis organization was unhappy with the aging facility, so they decided to sell the franchise. Madison, Wisconsin, which had lost the Madison Muskies to Grand Rapids, Michigan, obtained the Springfield franchise, and it became the Madison Hatters.

== Team record ==
Year	Record	League rank	Division	First half	Second half	Manager	Playoffs
1982	83–53	2nd	1st	—	—	Dave Bialis	Lost in first round
1983	80–59	2nd	1st	—	—	Dave Bialis	Lost championship series
1984	70–69	7th	1st	—	—	Joseph Rigoli	Lost championship series
1985	66–74	8th (t)	2nd (t)	—	—	Lloyd Merritt	—
1986	87–53	1st	1st	—	—	Gaylen Pitts	Lost in first round
1987	94–46	1st	1st	—	—	Gaylen Pitts	Lost championship series
1988	81–58	3rd	—	5th	1st	Mark DeJohn	Lost in first round
1989	73–62	5th	—	4th	1st	Dan Radison	Lost championship series
1990	63–76	9th	—	5th	6th	Keith Champion	—
1991	58–79	13th	—	7th	5th	Mike Ramsey	—
1992	84–56	2nd	—	3rd	2nd	Rick Colbert	—
1993	78–58	3rd	—	1st	2nd	Mike Ramsey	Lost in first round

Sources:

- "Minor League Baseball History". Baseball-Reference.com.
- "A Fan's Guide to the Midwest League". MWLguide.com.

== Notable alumni ==
The following position players appeared in at least 10 games with the Springfield Cardinals and also appeared in at least 500 Major League Baseball games:

- Bernard Gilkey played for Springfield in 1987–1988 and went on to a 12-season career as a major league left fielder, from 1990 to 2001. He played for St. Louis from 1990 to 1995 and had his best season with the New York Mets in 1996. He played with five teams altogether, and had a career .275 batting average with 118 home runs and 546 runs batting in.
- Ray Lankford played for Springfield in 1988 before going on to a 14-season career in the majors as a center fielder and left fielder. He played for St. Louis from 1990 to 2001 and returned in 2004 after playing part of 2001 and 2002 for the San Diego Padres. Lankford placed third in the voting for the 1991 National League Rookie of the Year Award and was named to the 1997 National League All-Star team. His career average was .272 with 238 home runs and 874 runs batted in.
- John Mabry played for Springfield in 1992. His major league career spanned 14 seasons (1994–2007) and eight teams, primarily as an outfielder and first baseman. He hit .263 for his career with 96 home runs and 446 runs batted in. Mabry was hired as a hitting coach for the St. Louis Cardinals in 2012.
- Tom Pagnozzi played for Springfield in 1984 and played in the majors for 12 seasons (1987–1998), all of them with the St. Louis Cardinals. As a catcher, he won three Gold Glove awards and was named to the 1992 National League All-Star team. Over his career he hit .253 with 44 home runs and 320 runs batted in.
- Dmitri Young played third base for Springfield in 1992. In 13 major league seasons (1996–2008) with four teams, he mostly played outfield and first base and was a designated hitter. Over his career he hit .292 with 171 home runs and 683 runs batted in. Young was twice selected for an All Star team—in 2003, while playing for the Detroit Tigers, and in 2007, while playing for the Washington Nationals—and in 2007 he was recognized as the National League Comeback Player of the Year.
- Todd Zeile was a catcher when he won the Midwest League Most Valuable Player Award for Springfield in 1987, but he played most of his 16 major league seasons as a third baseman. In a major league career that lasted from 1989 to 2004 and included 11 teams, he hit .265 with 253 home runs and 1,110 runs batted in.

The following pitchers appeared in at least five games with Springfield and also pitched at least 250 games or 700 innings in Major League Baseball:

- Danny Cox pitched for Springfield in their 1982 inaugural season and also pitched one game there (presumably a rehab assignment) in 1990. His major league career spanned 11 seasons (1983–1988, 1991–1995) and four teams. He pitched 278 games, including 174 starts, with a 74–75 record and a 3.64 ERA. In 1985 he went 18–9 with a 2.88 ERA for the National League pennant-winning St. Louis Cardinals. In 1993 he was a relief pitcher for the World Series champions, the Toronto Blue Jays.
- Doug Creek was a starter in the six games he pitched for Springfield in 1992, but his major league career was spent primarily as a left-handed relief pitcher. He went 7–14 with a 5.32 ERA in 279 games and 289 1/3 innings pitched. He played for nine seasons (1995–1997, 1999–2003, 2005) and with seven major league teams.
- Jeff Fassero pitched for Springfield in 1985 and went on to pitch 720 games (2,033 2/3 innings), including 242 starts, with nine major league teams over 16 seasons (1991–2006). His career record was 121–124 with 25 saves and a 4.11 ERA.
- John Frascatore was a starter for Springfield in 1993, but was a relief pitcher for most of his seven major league seasons (1994–1995, 1997–2001). He pitched 274 games and 371 innings for three teams, posting a 20–17 record and a 4.00 ERA.
- T. J. Mathews also was a starter for Springfield in 1993 and worked from the bullpen in the major leagues. He pitched 362 games and 435 1/3 innings for three teams during eight major league seasons (1995–2002). His record was 32–26 with 16 saves and a 3.82 ERA.
- Mike Pérez was relief pitcher with Springfield in 1987. He pitched in the major leagues for eight seasons, from 1990 to 1997, appearing in 313 games with three teams. His record was 24–16 with a 3.56 ERA in 346 innings.

Another former Springfield Cardinal player has gone on to become a major league manager:

- Bob Geren played for Springfield in 1983 and went on to play five seasons in the majors (1988–1991, 1993) with the New York Yankees and the San Diego Padres. He played 307 games, mostly as a catcher, and hit .233 with 22 home runs and 76 runs batted in. From 2007 to 2011, he served as the manager of the Oakland Athletics.

In addition, the following players also played at least one game for Springfield and one game in Major League Baseball:

- Scott Arnold
- Brian Barber
- Allen Battle
- Joe Boever
- Rod Brewer
- Kirk Bullinger
- Frank Cimorelli
- Tim Conroy
- John Costello
- Ken Dayley
- Mike DiFelice
- Tom Dozier
- Steve Engel
- Bryan Eversgerd
- Bien Figueroa
- Mike Fitzgerald
- Curt Ford
- Mark Grater
- Mike Gulan
- Joe Hall
- Mike Hartley
- Jeremy Hernandez
- Howard Hilton
- Aaron Holbert
- Ricky Horton
- Randy Hunt
- Keith Johns
- Matt Kinzer
- Jim Lindeman
- Bill Lyons
- Lonnie Maclin
- Mike Milchin
- Pat Perry
- Steve Peters
- Marc Ronan
- Da Rond Stovall
- Lee Tunnell
- Tom Urbani
- Paul Wilmet
- Craig Wilson
