= 1987 National League Championship Series =

19th edition of Major League Baseball's National League Championship Series

Team (Wins)	Managers	Season
St. Louis Cardinals (4)	Whitey Herzog	95–67, .586, GA: 3
San Francisco Giants (3)	Roger Craig	90–72, .556, GA: 6
- Dates: October 6–14
- MVP: Jeffrey Leonard (San Francisco)
- Umpires: John Kibler (crew chief); Ed Montague; Dave Pallone; Eric Gregg; Jim Quick; Bob Engel

Broadcast
- Television: NBC
- TV announcers: Vin Scully and Joe Garagiola
- Radio: CBS
- Radio announcers: Dick Stockton and Johnny Bench

The 1987 National League Championship Series took place in Major League Baseball’s 1987 postseason between October 6 and 14 at Busch Memorial Stadium (Games 1, 2, 6, and 7) and Candlestick Park (Games 3, 4, and 5). It matched the East division champion St. Louis Cardinals (95–67) against the West division champion San Francisco Giants (90–72), with the Cardinals winning in seven games. The Cardinals would go on to lose the 1987 World Series to the Minnesota Twins, also in seven games.

San Francisco's Jeffrey Leonard was named the Series MVP despite the fact that his Giants lost the series. Oddly enough, this was the second consecutive year that the NLCS MVP came from the losing team, as Mike Scott had won the award with the Houston Astros the previous year. Leonard, Scott, and Fred Lynn (1982) are the only players to win an LCS MVP on a losing team; it hasn't happened since Leonard's win in 1987.

== Summary ==
=== St. Louis Cardinals vs. San Francisco Giants ===
St. Louis won the series, 4–3.

Game	Date	Score	Location	Time	Attendance
1	October 6	San Francisco Giants – 3, St. Louis Cardinals – 5	Busch Stadium (II)	2:34	55,331
2	October 7	San Francisco Giants – 5, St. Louis Cardinals – 0	Busch Stadium (II)	2:33	55,331
3	October 9	St. Louis Cardinals – 6, San Francisco Giants – 5	Candlestick Park	3:27	57,913
4	October 10	St. Louis Cardinals – 2, San Francisco Giants – 4	Candlestick Park	2:23	57,997
5	October 11	St. Louis Cardinals – 3, San Francisco Giants – 6	Candlestick Park	2:48	59,363
6	October 13	San Francisco Giants – 0, St. Louis Cardinals – 1	Busch Stadium (II)	3:09	55,331
7	October 14	San Francisco Giants – 0, St. Louis Cardinals – 6	Busch Stadium (II)	2:59	55,331

== Game summaries ==
=== Game 1 ===
Tuesday, October 6, 1987, at Busch Stadium (II) in St. Louis, Missouri

Team	1	2	3	4	5	6	7	8	9	R	H	E
San Francisco	1	0	0	1	0	0	0	1	0	3	7	0
St. Louis	0	0	1	1	0	3	0	0	X	5	10	1
WP: Greg Mathews (1–0) LP: Rick Reuschel (0–1) Sv: Ken Dayley (1); Home runs: SF: Jeffrey Leonard (1); STL: None

The Giants struck first on an RBI groundout by Candy Maldonado, but the Cardinals tied it in the third on Vince Coleman's RBI single. Jeffrey Leonard gave the Giants a short-lived lead in the fourth on a homer, as the Cards quickly re-tied it when Ozzie Smith tripled and Willie McGee drove him home with a single.

The Cardinals took control of the game in the sixth by plating three runs off Giants starter Rick Reuschel. Terry Pendleton, Curt Ford, and pitcher Greg Mathews all had RBI singles in the rally. Ken Dayley pitched the ninth and got the save.

=== Game 2 ===
Wednesday, October 7, 1987, at Busch Stadium (II) in St. Louis, Missouri

Team	1	2	3	4	5	6	7	8	9	R	H	E
San Francisco	0	2	0	1	0	0	0	2	0	5	10	0
St. Louis	0	0	0	0	0	0	0	0	0	0	2	1
WP: Dave Dravecky (1–0) LP: John Tudor (0–1); Home runs: SF: Will Clark (1), Jeffrey Leonard (2); STL: None

The Giants pulled even in the series on the strength of a complete-game shutout by Dave Dravecky. Dravecky got all the runs he needed in the second on a Will Clark two-run homer. Jeffrey Leonard added a homer in the fourth, his second in two NLCS games. Two more runs came across in the eighth for the Giants on a rare Ozzie Smith throwing error.

It was in this game that Leonard aroused the ire of the Cardinal fans by going into his "Cadillac home run trot" around the bases. Leonard spread out his arms, airplane-style, but kept his left arm pinned to his side ("flap-down"). To further irritate the fans, Leonard slowed to a walk between third and home.

=== Game 3 ===
Friday, October 9, 1987, at Candlestick Park in San Francisco

Team	1	2	3	4	5	6	7	8	9	R	H	E
St. Louis	0	0	0	0	0	2	4	0	0	6	11	1
San Francisco	0	3	1	0	0	0	0	0	1	5	7	1
WP: Bob Forsch (1–0) LP: Don Robinson (0–1) Sv: Todd Worrell (1); Home runs: STL: Jim Lindeman (1); SF: Jeffrey Leonard (3), Harry Spilman (1)

In Game 3, Joe Magrane (STL) and Atlee Hammaker (SF) were set to face off. The matchup was not expected to be quite as low scoring as the series had been to date. The predictions were correct, as San Francisco broke first with four runs in the first three innings, looking to take the series lead. In the second inning, consecutive hits from Chili Davis, Will Clark and Bob Brenly put the Giants on the board. Yet another home run from Leonard tacked on a fourth run in the third.

On Leonard's next at-bat, however, Bob Forsch, who had relieved starter Magrane, plunked Leonard in the left shoulder with his first pitch, presumably in retaliation for his home-run trot antics. The Giants would load the bases in the inning with one out, but Forsch pitched out of it.

The Cardinals heated things up in the sixth with a two-run home run from Jim Lindeman, who replaced the injured Jack Clark, and then a triple by Willie McGee. But it was in the seventh when they really made their attack, not only tying the game, but scoring four to take the lead, 6–4. The four runs came on a large rally, highlighted by a two-run single by left fielder Vince Coleman.

With right-handed Todd Worrell pitching for the Cards, manager Roger Craig pinch hit left-handed batter Harry Spilman for Robby Thompson. Spilman homered to right field, putting new life back in the Giants, even with two down. However, third baseman Kevin Mitchell flew out to center field, and the Cards had completed a stunning comeback.

Cardinals slugger Jack Clark made his only appearance in the Series in Game 3. Nursing a sprained ankle, he came up as a pinch-hitter and struck out looking. His injury caused him to be left off the roster for the World Series, so the Cardinals could add another pitcher.

=== Game 4 ===
Saturday, October 10, 1987, at Candlestick Park in San Francisco

Team	1	2	3	4	5	6	7	8	9	R	H	E
St. Louis	0	2	0	0	0	0	0	0	0	2	9	0
San Francisco	0	0	0	1	2	0	0	1	X	4	9	2
WP: Mike Krukow (1–0) LP: Danny Cox (0–1); Home runs: STL: None; SF: Robby Thompson (1), Jeffrey Leonard (4), Bob Brenly (1)

The Giants knotted the series at 2–2 by the longball and another complete-game pitching performance, this time by Mike Krukow. Krukow was touched for two runs in the second on RBI singles by opposing pitcher Danny Cox and Vince Coleman, but then pitched shutout ball the rest of the way. Robby Thompson hit a homer in the fourth, Jeffrey Leonard put the Giants ahead 3–2 in the fifth with his fourth homer in the NLCS, and Bob Brenly closed out the scoring with a shot in the eighth.

=== Game 5 ===
Sunday, October 11, 1987, at Candlestick Park in San Francisco

Team	1	2	3	4	5	6	7	8	9	R	H	E
St. Louis	1	0	1	1	0	0	0	0	0	3	7	0
San Francisco	1	0	1	4	0	0	0	0	X	6	7	1
WP: Joe Price (1–0) LP: Bob Forsch (1–1); Home runs: STL: None; SF: Kevin Mitchell (1)

Tom Herr put the Cardinals up 1–0 in the first off Rick Reuschel with a sacrifice fly, then the Giants tied it in their half of the first on a Kevin Mitchell RBI single.

The Cardinals looked on the verge of breaking it open against Reuschel in the third. Tony Peña and pitcher Bob Forsch led off the inning with consecutive singles, and then Vince Coleman beat out a bunt, loading the bases with none out. Ozzie Smith could only produce a sacrifice fly, however, and Herr bounced into a double play to end the threat. Mitchell tied it at 2–2 for the Giants in the third on a homer.

Terry Pendleton then gave the Cards back the lead in the fourth in this nip-and-tuck game by smashing a two-out triple and scoring when Reuschel mishandled a throw by Will Clark on a ground ball hit by John Morris.

The Giants answered back in the bottom of the fourth when Jose Uribe drove in two runs with a bases-loaded single for a 4–3 Giants lead. Mike Aldrete then pinch-hit for Reuschel and hit a sacrifice fly and Robby Thompson drove in the last run with a triple. Joe Price then relieved Reuschel and pitched five innings of one-hit, shutout relief.

Thompson's RBI would be the last Giants run of the series.

=== Game 6 ===
Tuesday, October 13, 1987, at Busch Stadium (II) in St. Louis, Missouri

Team	1	2	3	4	5	6	7	8	9	R	H	E
San Francisco	0	0	0	0	0	0	0	0	0	0	6	0
St. Louis	0	1	0	0	0	0	0	0	X	1	5	0
WP: John Tudor (1–1) LP: Dave Dravecky (1–1) Sv: Ken Dayley (2)

Facing elimination, the Cardinals rolled out their ace, John Tudor, to face Dave Dravecky once again. Tudor was injured for most of the first half of 1987, but rebounded to go 10–2 in the second half of the season. And, like his great 1985 season, Tudor was golden in the postseason. He scattered six hits in seven innings and struck out six before giving way to Todd Worrell.

Tudor got the only run he needed in the second inning when Tony Peña hit what appeared to be a routine fly ball to right, but Candy Maldonado misplayed it and it fell for a triple. José Oquendo then drove Pena home with a sacrifice fly.

Ken Dayley pitched the ninth for his second save of the series.

=== Game 7 ===
Wednesday, October 14, 1987, at Busch Stadium (II) in St. Louis, Missouri

Team	1	2	3	4	5	6	7	8	9	R	H	E
San Francisco	0	0	0	0	0	0	0	0	0	0	8	1
St. Louis	0	4	0	0	0	2	0	0	X	6	12	0
WP: Danny Cox (1–1) LP: Atlee Hammaker (0–1); Home runs: SF: None; STL: José Oquendo (1)

The Cardinals gave starter Danny Cox a quick 4–0 lead by jumping on Giants starter Atlee Hammaker in the second. Singles by Terry Pendleton, Tony Peña and Willie McGee produced the first run and José Oquendo, who had hit only one home run during the regular season, drilled a three-run shot to left. St. Louis added two more runs in the sixth on a two-run single by Tommy Herr. Cox went the distance, scattering eight hits and striking out five. The victory gave the Cardinals their third pennant in six years and 15th overall. The only downside in the victory was Pendleton suffering a strained ribcage while running the bases, which limited his availability in the World Series to left-handed DH-ing and pinch hitting. As of today, this is the last time the Giants have lost the NLCS.

== Composite box ==
1987 NLCS (4–3): St. Louis Cardinals over San Francisco Giants

Team	1	2	3	4	5	6	7	8	9	R	H	E
St. Louis Cardinals	1	7	2	2	0	7	4	0	0	23	56	3
San Francisco Giants	2	5	2	7	2	0	0	4	1	23	54	5
Total attendance: 396,597 Average attendance: 56,657

The Giants did not score another run for the series after the 4th inning of Game 5.

== Series stats & information ==
Cardinals Hitting Bests:

- Series AB's: Herr (27)
- Series Runs: Pena (5)
- Series Hits: Pena (8)
- Series Doubles: Dan Driessen (2)
- Series Triples: Pena, McGee, Terry Pendleton, Ozzie Smith (1)
- Series HR's: Oquendo, Lindeman (1)
- Series RBIs: Coleman, Oquendo (4)
- Series Base on Balls: Coleman (4)
- Series Batting average (at least 10 at bats): Pena (.381)

Giants Hitting Bests:

- Series AB'S: Mitchell (30)
- Series Runs: Thompson (4)
- Series Hits: Leonard (10)
- Series Doubles: Clark (2)
- Series Triples: Thompson (1)
- Series HR's: Leonard (4)
- Series RBIs: Leonard (5)
- Series Base on Balls: Thompson (5)
- Series Batting average (at least 10 at bats): Leonard (.417)

Cardinals Pitching Bests:

- Series Wins: Cox, Tudor, Mathews, Forsch (1)
- Series Saves: Dayley (2)
- Series Complete Games: Cox (2)
- Series IP: Cox (17)
- Series SO's: Tudor (12)
- Series ERA (at least 4 innings pitched): Dayley, Worrell (2.66)

Giants Pitching Bests:

- Series Wins: Dravecky, Krukow, Price (1)
- Series Saves: None
- Series Complete Games: Dravecky, Krukow (1)
- Series IP: Dravecky (15)
- Series SO's: Dravecky (14)
- Series ERA (at least 4 innings pitched): Dravecky (0.60)

== Aftermath ==
The Cardinals and Giants developed quite the disdain for each other in the mid-to-late 1980s. One of the more memorable baseball brawls happened between the two clubs during the following season in 1988. The first fight was prompted by a hard slide into second by Will Clark that sent Cardinals second baseman José Oquendo reeling toward the outfield grass. Oquendo and shortstop Ozzie Smith threw a punch at Clark and both benches emptied; Oquendo and Clark were ejected. A second confrontation occurred moments later when the Cardinals' Scott Terry nearly hit Mike Aldrete in the head with a pitch. The teams poured onto the field again but were intercepted by the umpires. Terry was ejected, and the ninth inning was played without incident.

The Cardinals would go on the lose the World Series in seven games to the Minnesota Twins. After their defeat in the '87 Series, the Cardinals' reign of dominance in the '80s ended. They did not return to the postseason until 1996, did not return to the World Series until 2004, and did not win it all until 2006. Giants would return to the NLCS in 1989, where they beat the Chicago Cubs in five games before losing to the Oakland Athletics in the World Series. The Giants did not win a World Series in San Francisco until 2010.

The Cardinals and Giants have played each other three more times in the postseason, with the Giants winning all three. Those series wins came in the 2002 National League Championship Series, the 2012 National League Championship Series, and the 2014 National League Championship Series. Coincidentally, a play similar to what sparked Will Clark and José Oquendo brawl in 1988 happened in the 2012 NLCS when Cardinals' left fielder Matt Holliday slid late into Giants' second baseman Marco Scutaro in hopes to break up a double play. No brawl occurred this time, however.

To date, Jeffrey Leonard is the last person to be named the Most Valuable Player of a League Championship Series or World Series while a member of the losing team.
