= Jeffrey Leonard =

American baseball player (born 1955)

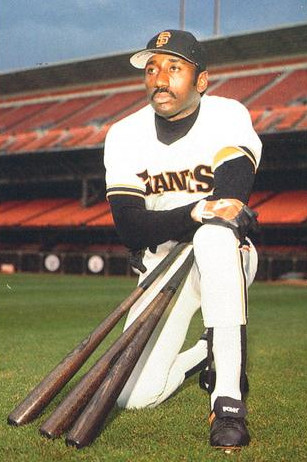
- Leonard with the Giants in 1983
- Left fielder
- Born: September 22, 1955 (age 70); Philadelphia, Pennsylvania, U.S.
- Batted: Right Threw: Right

MLB debut
- September 2, 1977, for the Los Angeles Dodgers

Last MLB appearance
- October 3, 1990, for the Seattle Mariners

MLB statistics
- Batting average: .266
- Home runs: 144
- Runs batted in: 723
- Stats at Baseball Reference

Teams
- Los Angeles Dodgers (1977); Houston Astros (1978–1981); San Francisco Giants (1981–1988); Milwaukee Brewers (1988); Seattle Mariners (1989–1990)

Career highlights and awards
- 2× All-Star (1987, 1989); NLCS MVP (1987); San Francisco Giants Wall of Fame

Jeffrey N. Leonard (born September 22, 1955) is an American former professional baseball left fielder. He played 14 seasons in Major League Baseball (MLB) from 1977 to 1990 for the Los Angeles Dodgers, Houston Astros, San Francisco Giants, Milwaukee Brewers, and Seattle Mariners.

Leonard was known professionally until the 1986 season as "Jeff" Leonard.

== Early years ==
Leonard was born in Philadelphia. He was a standout in football, basketball, and baseball at Overbrook High School in Philadelphia, which also produced basketball stars Wilt Chamberlain and Walt Hazzard. Leonard received 60 college scholarship offers for football, five for basketball, and none for baseball, where he played shortstop and twice hit two home runs in one inning.

== Baseball career ==
Leonard signed as an amateur free agent by the Los Angeles Dodgers in June 1973.

=== Minor league career ===
While playing in the minor leagues in the middle of the 1981 season Max Venable and Guy Sularz gave Leonard the nickname "HackMan" because he had a habit of swinging at the first pitch no matter what. People spelled it "Hackman" but he did not like the way the spelling looked, and said, "Spell it like the video game PacMan", so it came out as "HacMan." Leonard was known for his "one flap down" routine: running around the bases after hitting a home run with one arm hanging motionless at his side. Leonard tied for the California League lead for assists by an outfielder with 13 while playing for the Bakersfield Dodgers in 1976. He also led the Pacific Coast League with 183 hits while batting .365 while playing for the Albuquerque Dukes in 1978.

=== Notable achievements in Major League Baseball ===
Leonard, along with Dave Bergman, was traded from the Houston Astros to the San Francisco Giants for Mike Ivie on April 20, 1981. He was selected to the National League All-Star team in 1987 and to the American League All-Star team in 1989.

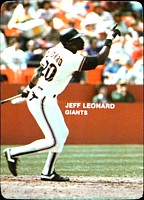
Leonard batting for the Giants in 1985

Leonard's greatest moment as a player most likely occurred during the 1987 National League Championship Series (NLCS) while with the San Francisco Giants. During the seven-game series against the St. Louis Cardinals, Leonard had five runs, ten hits, four home runs, five runs batted in, a batting average of .417, and a slugging percentage of .917. For his performance, Leonard was awarded the 1987 NLCS Most Valuable Player Award. As of 2026, Leonard is the last person to be named the Most Valuable Player of a League Championship Series or World Series while a member of the losing team. His four home runs tied a record shared by Bob Robertson (1971) and Steve Garvey (1978) for most home runs in a LCS.

It was also during this NLCS that Leonard would draw ire for a "Cadillac" home run trot; the Cardinals felt he took a little too much time rounding the bases on his home runs, thereby showing up the pitcher. In response to this attitude, and for Leonard's repeated "one-flap down" routine of running bases, Cardinals pitcher Bob Forsch famously hit Leonard in the back with a fastball in the fifth inning of Game 3. The St. Louis press began calling Leonard "both flaps down" after the incident.

Leonard was dealt from the Giants to the Milwaukee Brewers for Ernest Riles on June 8, 1988. His playing time reduced because of injuries, he had been replaced by Mike Aldrete as the starting left fielder.

Leonard had a solid career in the majors that included a lifetime .266 batting average, 144 home runs, 614 runs scored, and 723 RBI. During his first season as a starting outfielder, he hit .290 for the Houston Astros in 1979. His best season was in 1984 when Leonard hit .302 with 21 homers and 86 RBI for the Giants. His best season for power came with Seattle in 1989 as he finished with a .254 average along with 24 home runs and 93 RBI.

=== Pittsburgh drug trials ===
Leonard was one of seven then-current or former major league baseball players who testified at the 1985 cocaine trafficking trial of Curtis Strong, which became known as the Pittsburgh drug trials. Many of the players who testified, including Leonard, were given immunity from prosecution in exchange for their testimony. Baseball commissioner Peter Ueberroth suspended 11 players on February 28, 1986, including Leonard. Ueberroth interviewed the involved players during the off-season at the end of that year, and imposed sanctions against players for their apparent involvement in the cocaine network. Leonard was among a group of players that Ueberroth cited as having had a "prolonged pattern of drug use" and had involvement in cocaine distribution; these players were issued one-year suspensions from Major League Baseball, however, the suspensions were to be waived in exchange for donations to drug-treatment programs, and community service performed with drug-related organizations. The donations for many, including Leonard, were to amount to 10% of their base salaries (in Leonard's case, this amounted to $80,000) and players had to submit to drug testing for the rest of their careers. The Pittsburgh drug trials are considered one of Major League Baseball's biggest scandals of all time, albeit one that was "behind the scenes" and did not affect play on the field.

== Post-playing activities ==
Since his retirement, Leonard has coached both in minor league organizations and college baseball. He coached the Antelope Valley College Marauders baseball team in 2003 and 2004, where he had win–loss record of 25-44-1. Since 2013, he has been a part of the San Francisco Giants front office as a community ambassador.

Leonard is the father of two sons. Leonard and his former wife started a foundation called the One Flap Down Foundation to help single parents going through breast cancer treatment, after Leonard's former step-daughter Christine, a single mother of three, was diagnosed with breast cancer in 2009.

== See also ==
- Houston Astros award winners and league leaders
- List of Major League Baseball career stolen bases leaders
- List of Major League Baseball career runs scored leaders
- List of Major League Baseball players to hit for the cycle
- List of sportspeople sanctioned for doping offences

Achievements
Preceded by Dwight Evans	Hitting for the cycle June 27, 1985	Succeeded by Keith Hernandez
