= Scott Arnold (baseball) =

American baseball player (born 1962)

- Pitcher
- Born: August 18, 1962 (age 63); Lexington, Kentucky, U.S.
- Batted: Right Threw: Right

MLB debut
- April 7, 1988, for the St. Louis Cardinals

Last MLB appearance
- April 23, 1988, for the St. Louis Cardinals

MLB statistics
- Win–loss record: 0–0
- Earned run average: 5.40
- Strikeouts: 8
- Stats at Baseball Reference

Teams
- St. Louis Cardinals (1988)

Scott Gentry Arnold (born August 18, 1962) is an American former professional baseball player whose career spanned seven seasons. His career included spending a part the 1988 season in Major League Baseball with the St. Louis Cardinals. Arnold, a pitcher, compiled no record with a 5.40 earned run average (ERA) and eight strikeouts in six games, all in relief appearances during his major league career. He also played in the minor leagues with the rookie-league Johnson City Cardinals, the Class-A Springfield Cardinals, the Class-A Savannah Cardinals, the Class-A St. Petersburg Cardinals, the Double-A Arkansas Travelers and the Triple-A Louisville Redbirds. Over his minor league career, Arnold compiled a record of 58–50 with a 3.55 ERA in 171 games, 148 starts. Before turning professional, Arnold played baseball at Miami University.

== Amateur career ==
From 1981 to 1984, Arnold attended Miami University. During the 1983 Major League Baseball draft, Arnold was selected in the 40^{th} round by the New York Yankees. In his senior year at Miami, the St. Louis Cardinals selected Arnold in the fifth round of the 1984 Major League Baseball draft.

== Professional career ==
After being drafted by the St. Louis Cardinals in 1984, Arnold was assigned to play in their minor league organization with the Johnson City Cardinals of the rookie-level Appalachian League. With Johnson City, Arnold compiled a record of 4–5 with a 3.05 earned run average (ERA) in 14 games, 13 starts. Arnold then received a promotion to the Class-A Springfield Cardinals during that season and in one game, gave-up six runs (all earned) in six innings pitched. Arnold spent the entire 1985 season with the Class-A Savannah Cardinals, who were members of the South Atlantic League. His record that season was 8–9 with a 3.30 ERA in 24 games, all starts. Arnold split the 1986 season between the Class-A St. Petersburg Cardinals and the Double-A Arkansas Travelers. With St. Petersburg, Arnold went 10–5 with a 2.71 ERA in 22 games, all starts. He was also named a Class-A all-star that season. He was promoted to the Double-A level in August. With the Travelers went 4–1 with a 3.81 ERA in five games, all starts. After the 1986 season, Arnold was added to the St. Louis Cardinals 40-man roster. In 1987, Arnold spent the season with the Arkansas Travelers. On the season, he compiled a record of 12–9 with a 4.05 ERA in 29 games, all starts.

Before the start of the regular season in 1988, the St. Louis Cardinals optioned Arnold to the minor leagues. However, they soon recalled him after pitcher Ken Dayley was put on the disabled list. Arnold made his debut in Major League Baseball on April 7, 1988. In that game, which was against the Cincinnati Reds, Arnold struck out three and gave-up no runs in 1 1/3 innings pitched. His last major league appearance was on April 23, against the New York Mets. Over his one season in the majors, Arnold compiled no record with a 5.40 ERA and eight strikeouts in six games, all in relief. On April 25, the Cardinals activated pitcher John Tudor from the disabled list and sent Arnold down to the minor leagues. During the month of May, the Cardinals considered recalling Arnold, who had been playing in their minor league organization, but it was not done. In the minors that season, Arnold played for the Double-A Arkansas Travelers and the Triple-A Louisville Redbirds. In June, Arnold was named the St. Louis Cardinals minor league player of the month. Between the two teams that season, Arnold went 10–7 with a 2.98 ERA in 24 games, all starts.

During the 1989 season, Arnold played with the Triple-A Louisville Redbirds, who were minor league affiliates of the St. Louis Cardinals. Before that season, he did play with the Cardinals during spring training, but was reassigned to the minors before the start of the regular season. With the Redbirds that season, Arnold compiled a record of 8–10 with a 3.97 ERA, two complete games, one shutout and 88 strikeouts in 34 games, 22 starts. Arnold split the 1990 season between the Double-A Arkansas Travelers and the Triple-A Louisville Redbirds. With the Travelers, he went 1–0 with a 2.62 ERA and 15 strikeouts in four games, all starts. At the Triple-A level, Arnold went 1–3 with a 6.08 ERA and 23 strikeouts in 14 games, four starts.
