= Kurt Kepshire =

American baseball player (born 1959)

- Pitcher
- Born: July 3, 1959 (age 65); Bridgeport, Connecticut, U.S.
- Batted: Left Threw: Right

MLB debut
- July 4, 1984, for the St. Louis Cardinals

Last MLB appearance
- April 23, 1986, for the St. Louis Cardinals

MLB statistics
- Win–loss record: 16–15
- Earned run average: 4.16
- Strikeouts: 144
- Stats at Baseball Reference

Teams
- St. Louis Cardinals (1984–1986)

Kurt David Kepshire (born July 3, 1959) is an American former professional baseball player, a right-handed pitcher who appeared in 51 Major League games for the St. Louis Cardinals (1984–1986). He stood 6 feet 1 inch (1.85 m) tall and weighed 180 pounds (82 kg).

== Career ==
Kepshire's professional career lasted for 11 seasons (1979–1989). After attending the University of New Haven, he was selected by the Cincinnati Reds in the 25th round of the 1979 Major League Baseball draft. He then spent four seasons in the Cincinnati farm system before he was acquired by the Cardinals in the 1982 Rule 5 draft. Kepshire required another year and a half of minor league seasoning before making his Major League debut on July 4, 1984, against the San Francisco Giants at Candlestick Park. He went 81/3 innings that day, holding the Giants to one run on eight hits and two bases on balls. Jeff Lahti retired the final two Giant batters of the game to save Kepshire's 5–1 triumph. After a relief appearance, Kepshire took a regular turn in the Cardinals' starting rotation from July 15 through the end of the 1984 season, finishing the season with two complete-game shutouts, September 21 against the Chicago Cubs and September 26 against the Montreal Expos. As a rookie, he won six of 11 decisions with a 3.60 earned run average in 17 games, 16 of them starts.

His sophomore season with the Cardinals saw Kepshire keep his place in the starting rotation through most of the season and win ten more games, but his effectiveness diminished. He allowed 155 hits, 16 home runs and 77 bases on balls in 1531/3 innings pitched, with only 67 strikeouts. In his final two starting assignments, both against the Cubs, he lasted only one full inning on September 9; then, five days later, he walked the first three batters he faced without recording an out before being relieved. The Cardinals were embroiled in a tight pennant race against the New York Mets, and Kepshire made only two more appearances that year, both in relief. The Redbirds would win the 1985 National League East Division and National League championships, but Kepshire did not appear on the Cards' 1985 NLCS or 1985 World Series roster.

Kepshire made only two more Major League appearances, both in April 1986. As a starter, he went seven five-hit innings in a 3–2 loss to Montreal on April 13, then one inning of relief against the Cubs ten days later. Then the Cardinals sent him to the minors, where he struggled through a 3–13 season split between Triple-A and Double-A. He left the Cardinal system in 1987 and pitched in Mexico before returning to the affiliated minors for two final seasons, in the Montreal and Minnesota Twins' organizations.

All told, Kepshire appeared in 51 MLB games, 46 of them starts, winning 16 of 31 decisions, and allowing 263 hits and 119 bases on balls in 2701/3 innings pitched. He struck out 144.

After retiring from baseball, Kepshire was a correctional officer at Bridgeport Correctional Institute in Bridgeport, Connecticut for many years before leaving behind his home in Oxford, Connecticut and relocating to Bonita Springs, Florida in 2014 with his domestic partner, where he resides to this day.
