= Mike Jorgensen =

American baseball player and manager (born 1948)

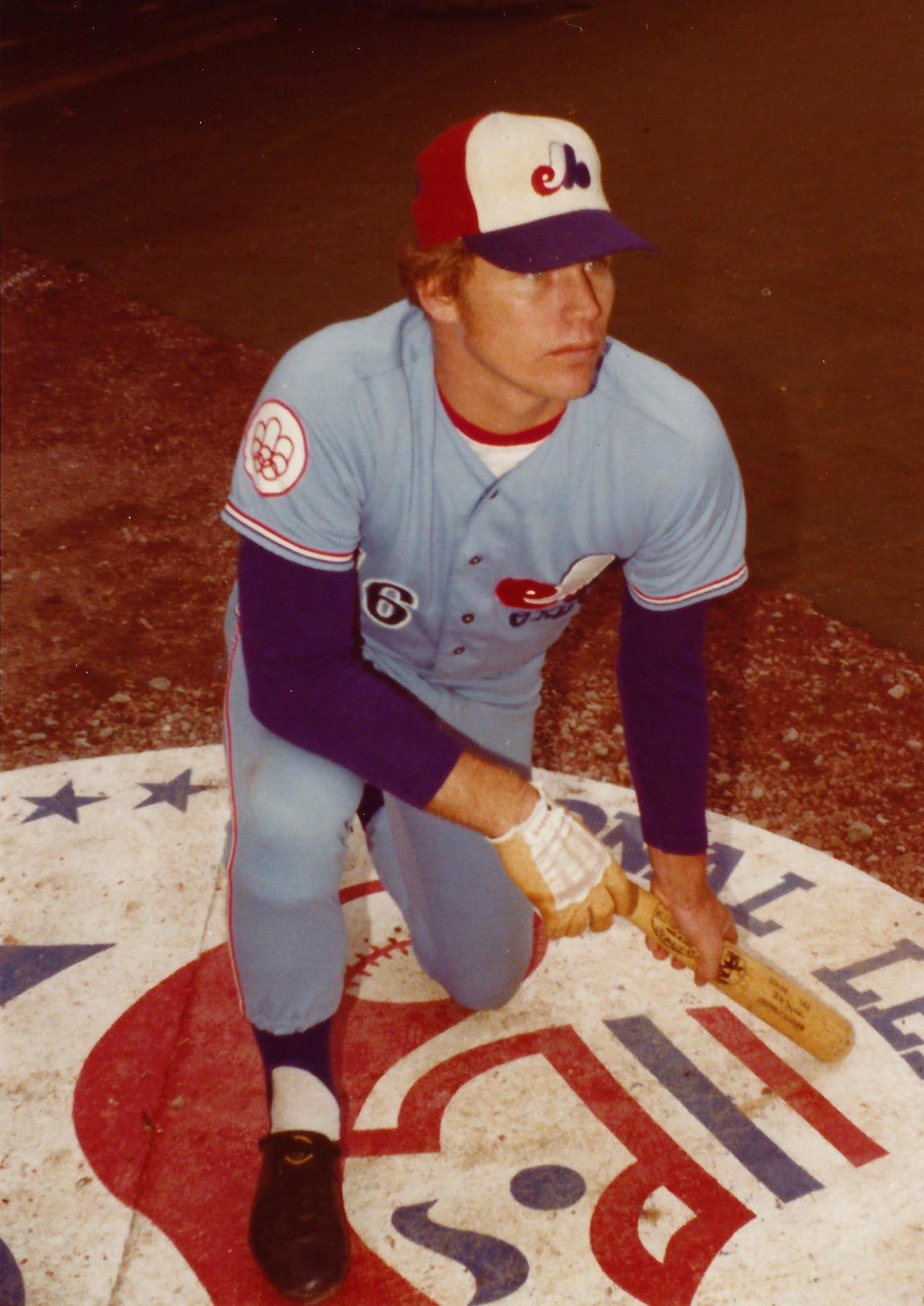
- First baseman / Manager
- Born: August 16, 1948 (age 78); Passaic, New Jersey, U.S.
- Batted: Left Threw: Left

MLB debut
- September 10, 1968, for the New York Mets

Last MLB appearance
- October 6, 1985, for the St. Louis Cardinals

MLB statistics
- Batting average: .243
- Home runs: 95
- Runs batted in: 426
- Managerial record: 42–54
- Winning %: .438
- Stats at Baseball Reference
- Managerial record at Baseball Reference

Teams
- As player: New York Mets (1968, 1970–1971); Montreal Expos (1972–1977); Oakland Athletics (1977); Texas Rangers (1978–1979); New York Mets (1980–1983); Atlanta Braves (1983–1984); St. Louis Cardinals (1984–1985); As manager: St. Louis Cardinals (1995)

Career highlights and awards
- Gold Glove Award (1973)

Michael Jorgensen (born August 16, 1948) is an American former professional baseball first baseman and outfielder who currently works in the St. Louis Cardinals' front office. The New York Mets drafted him in the fourth round of the 1966 Major League Baseball draft. In a 17-year Major League Baseball (MLB) playing career spanning from 1968 to 1985, he played primarily with the Mets and Montreal Expos and had brief stints with the Cardinals, Atlanta Braves, Texas Rangers and Oakland Athletics. He also has served as a manager for the Cardinals. Jorgensen is the only major league baseball player to have been born the day Babe Ruth died.

== Playing career ==
Jorgensen was raised in Bayside, Queens, in New York City. He attended Francis Lewis High School. The New York Mets signed a contract with him in 1966.

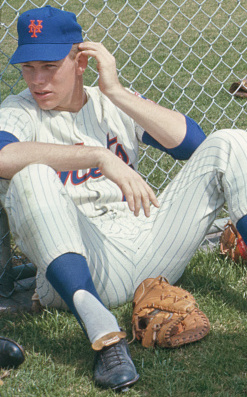
Jorgensen with the New York Mets during spring training

Jorgensen made his major league debut with the New York Mets as a September call-up in 1968. He played the entire 1969 season in the minors. On April 5, 1972, he was traded with Tim Foli and Ken Singleton to the Montreal Expos for Rusty Staub.

It was in Montreal where Jorgensen enjoyed his greatest success. In 1973, he earned his only Gold Glove Award as a first baseman, the only time between 1967 and 1977 that a Los Angeles Dodger first baseman did not win the Gold Glove Award: Jorgensen broke Wes Parker's six-year run from 1967-72 (after which season Parker retired from Major League Baseball), and preceded Steve Garvey, who won the award from 1974-77. In 1974, he broke the Expos' single season record for on-base percentage with .444, on the way to setting career highs in batting average (.310), slugging percentage (.488) and adjusted OPS (156). The next year, he set more career highs with the bat—clubbing 18 home runs, and driving in 67 runs.

Jorgensen became expendable when the Expos acquired first baseman Tony Pérez and was traded to the Oakland Athletics at the start of the 1977 season. Following one season with the A's, he signed as a free agent with the Texas Rangers.

=== Beanball incident ===
On May 28, 1979, Jorgensen was hit in the head by a pitch from Boston Red Sox pitcher Andy Hassler. Dave Roberts entered the game to pinch run for Jorgensen, and Pat Putnam took over as the Rangers' regular first baseman for the next month. Excluding one pinch-hitting appearance on May 31, he did not play again until July 1. After suffering headaches, it was discovered he had a small blood clot inside his head, which apparently caused a seizure, and could have resulted in death. Following the season, he was traded back to the Mets to complete a mid-season deal in which the Mets had sent Willie Montañez to the Rangers for two players to be named later (the other player the Mets received was pitcher Ed Lynch).

On July 4, 1980, Montreal Expos rookie Bill Gullickson sailed a pitch over Jorgensen's head in the second game of a doubleheader. Jorgensen motioned towards Gullickson in disapproval. Mets catcher John Stearns then charged out of the dugout and slammed Gullickson to the ground.

=== Post-season appearance ===
Jorgensen's second go-around with the Mets lasted until June 15, 1983. The Mets sold him to the Atlanta Braves the day they acquired first baseman Keith Hernández from the St. Louis Cardinals for pitchers Neil Allen and Rick Ownbey. A year to the day later, the Braves traded him with Ken Dayley to the Cardinals for Ken Oberkfell. With the Cardinals, he reached his first World Series in 1985 in his final season. Coincidentally, Hassler was also a member of this team.

=== Career statistics ===
Seasons	Games	AB	Runs	Hits	2B	3B	HR	RBI	SB	CS	BB	SO	HBP	Avg.	OBP	Slg.	Fld%
17	1633	3421	429	833	132	13	95	426	58	44	532	589	25	.243	.347	.373	.993

== Cardinals manager ==
Following Joe Torre's firing as manager of the Cardinals in 1995, Jorgensen finished the season as their interim manager. He led St. Louis to a 42–54 win–loss record before Tony La Russa was hired to be the permanent manager for 1996.

== Front-office work ==
In 2001, Jorgensen began working as a senior special assistant to St. Louis Cardinals general manager John Mozeliak, scouting the American League. He had served for the previous 10 years as the Cardinals' director of player development (farm director) and prior to that was the team's minor league hitting instructor/coordinator in 1990 and 1991.
