= Gary Lucas (baseball) =

American baseball player (born 1954)

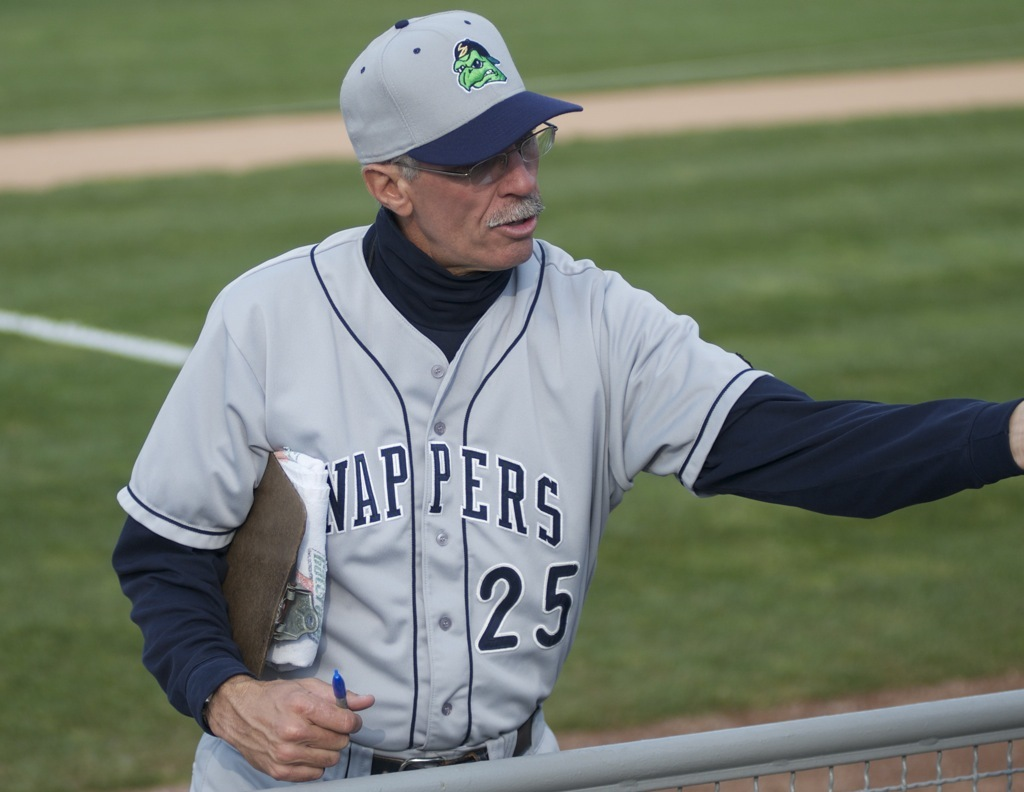
- Lucas with the Beloit Snappers in 2008
- Pitcher
- Born: November 8, 1954 (age 71); Riverside, California, U.S.
- Batted: Left Threw: Left

MLB debut
- April 16, 1980, for the San Diego Padres

Last MLB appearance
- October 3, 1987, for the California Angels

MLB statistics
- Win–loss record: 29–44
- Earned run average: 3.01
- Strikeouts: 410
- Saves: 63
- Stats at Baseball Reference

Teams
- San Diego Padres (1980–1983); Montreal Expos (1984–1985); California Angels (1986–1987)

Gary Paul Lucas (born November 8, 1954) is an American former professional baseball pitcher who pitched in Major League Baseball (MLB) with the San Diego Padres (1980–83), Montreal Expos (1984–85) and California Angels (1986–87).

== Career ==
=== Playing career ===
Lucas was drafted twice by the Cincinnati Reds in 1973 out of Riverside City College, once in the Regular Phase of the January Draft (21st overall) and once in the Secondary Phase of the June Draft (18th overall). He failed to come to terms with the Reds on a contract and became re-eligible for the draft, subsequently being selected by the San Diego Padres in the 19th round of the 1976 amateur draft out of Chapman College.

Lucas made his major league debut on April 16, 1980, pitching one relief inning in a Padres' loss to the Los Angeles Dodgers. He was used as a starting pitcher for much of his rookie season before being used exclusively as a reliever for the remainder of his major league career. In 1981, Lucas led all National League pitchers by appearing in 57 games. In his final major league appearance, Lucas pitched 2 1/3 innings of scoreless work to close out a Jack Lazorko win for the California Angels on October 3, 1987.

In eight major league seasons, he posted a career record of 29–44 with 63 saves and a 3.01 ERA in 669 innings.

=== Coaching career ===
Lucas has served as a pitching coach for a variety of minor league baseball teams. He was the pitching coach with the Wisconsin Timber Rattlers, the Milwaukee Brewers' Class-A team in 2015 before spending the following two seasons as a coach with the Class-AA New Britain Rock Cats. Wanting to be closer to his home in Rice Lake, Wisconsin, Lucas asked to be reassigned back to Beloit, where he remained through 2012, when the Twins moved their Midwest League team to Cedar Rapids. Lucas spent one year in Cedar Rapids, before being moved to the Twins High-A franchise, the Fort Myers Miracle in 2014. Lucas was dismissed by the Twins following the 2014 season.
