= Bob Engel =

American baseball umpire (1933–2018)

- Born: Robert Allen Engel; October 11, 1933; Atascadero, California, U.S.
- Died: March 5, 2018 (aged 84); Fallon, Nevada, U.S.
- Occupation: Umpire
- Years active: 1965–1990
- Employer: National League

Robert Allen Engel (October 11, 1933 – March 5, 2018) was an American professional baseball umpire who worked in the National League from 1965 to 1990. Engel wore uniform number 5 for most of his career.

A former president of the umpires union, Engel retired after being arrested for the theft of more than 4,000 baseball cards from a Target store in California, for which he pleaded no contest.

== Early life ==
As a young man in Bakersfield, California, Engel worked as a hotel bellhop. Baseball umpires who stayed at the hotel caught his attention; he noticed that they stayed out late at night and did not have to wake up until the early afternoon. After serving in the military, Engel worked for an oil tool company. After seeing ads in The Sporting News for the George Barr Umpire School, Engel decided to attend. He was hired into professional baseball and worked ten years in the minor leagues before receiving his promotion to the major leagues.

== Career ==
Engel was an umpire in the 1972, 1979, and 1985 World Series. He worked four Major League Baseball All-Star Games, and six National League Championship Series. In his career, Engel umpired 3,630 major-league games.

Interviewed for a 1987 piece in Sports Illustrated, Engel expressed annoyance at fellow umpires with a flair for the dramatic, saying that "the players don't care how much gyration you put on. All they care about is getting them right. And I'll guarantee you, the players always want to know who's umpiring, because no two umpires have the same strike zone."

He was the president of the Major League Umpires Association, the union for major-league umpires, at the time of the 1978 umpire strike.

Engel retired in 1990 after he pleaded no contest to charges of stealing more than 4,000 1990 Score baseball cards from a Target store in Bakersfield and attempting to steal cards from a second store. He was sentenced to three years of probation.

Engel died on March 5, 2018.

== See also ==
- List of Major League Baseball umpires (disambiguation)
