= Pat Perry =

American baseball player (born 1959)

- Pitcher
- Born: February 4, 1959 (age 67); Taylorville, Illinois, U.S.
- Batted: Left Threw: Left

MLB debut
- September 12, 1985, for the St. Louis Cardinals

Last MLB appearance
- September 30, 1990, for the Los Angeles Dodgers

MLB statistics
- Win–loss record: 12–10
- Earned run average: 3.46
- Strikeouts: 131
- Stats at Baseball Reference

Teams
- St. Louis Cardinals (1985–1987); Cincinnati Reds (1987–1988); Chicago Cubs (1988–1989); Los Angeles Dodgers (1990)

William Patrick Perry (born February 4, 1959) is an American former pitcher who played in Major League Baseball. He pitched from 1985 to 1990 for the St. Louis Cardinals, Cincinnati Reds, Chicago Cubs and Los Angeles Dodgers.
