= Danny Cox (baseball) =

Anglo-American baseball player (born 1959)

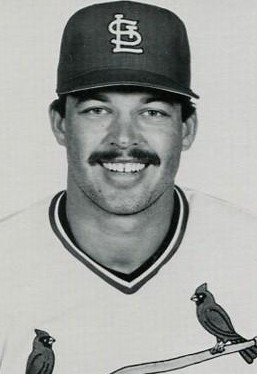
- Pitcher
- Born: 21 September 1959 (age 66); Northampton, England
- Batted: Right Threw: Right

MLB debut
- August 6, 1983, for the St. Louis Cardinals

Last MLB appearance
- September 18, 1995, for the Toronto Blue Jays

MLB statistics
- Win–loss record: 74–75
- Earned run average: 3.64
- Strikeouts: 723
- Stats at Baseball Reference

Teams
- St. Louis Cardinals (1983–1988); Philadelphia Phillies (1991–1992); Pittsburgh Pirates (1992); Toronto Blue Jays (1993–1995)

Career highlights and awards
- World Series champion (1993)

Daniel Bradford Cox (born 21 September 1959) is an English born American former professional baseball pitcher, who played in Major League Baseball (MLB) for the St. Louis Cardinals (1983–1988), the Philadelphia Phillies (1991–1992), the Pittsburgh Pirates (1992), and the Toronto Blue Jays (1993–1995), after which he retired from active play.

Danny Cox was born in Northampton, Northamptonshire, where his father was stationed while serving in the United States Air Force. Cox attended Berlin American High School in Berlin, Germany, before returning to Warner Robins, Georgia, where he graduated from Warner Robins High School. After high school, He attended Chattahoochee Valley Community College in Phenix City, Alabama before receiving a scholarship to Troy University in Troy, Alabama. Cox was selected in the 13th round of the 1981 Major League Baseball draft by the Cardinals. Over Cox’ eleven-year big league career, he won 74, lost 75, recorded a 3.64 earned run average (ERA), 21 complete games, five shutouts, and eight saves. Cox won Game 3 of the 1985 National League Championship Series with the Cardinals trailing 2 games to none. He pitched well in the 1985 World Series, but earned two no-decisions. Cox pitched a shutout in Game 7 of the 1987 National League Championship Series, and was the winning pitcher in Game 5 of the 1987 World Series. After being removed in Game 7, he argued with umpire Dave Phillips; Cox was then ejected, as he left the field. Cox pitched in the 1993 World Series with the Toronto Blue Jays, appearing in three games.

Cox was inducted into the St. Louis Sports Hall of Fame on May 2, 2022.

In December 2022, Cox was given a citation for poaching by the Illinois Conservation Police.

== Coaching career ==
Cox managed the Gateway Grizzlies, a Frontier League team based in Sauget, Illinois, from 2003 to 2006, compiling a record of 197–175 and one league championship. In 2008, he coached the New Athens, Illinois, High School baseball team, however he resigned mid-season. Cox currently frequents clinics in the St. Louis area, and offers pitching lessons to young players near his Freeburg, Illinois, home.

In February 2009, Cox was named pitching coach for the Springfield Sliders of the Prospect League.

On 17 December 2009, the Lancaster Barnstormers of the Atlantic League of Professional Baseball named Cox pitching coach for the 2010 season.
