= Steve Peters (baseball) =

American baseball player (born 1962)

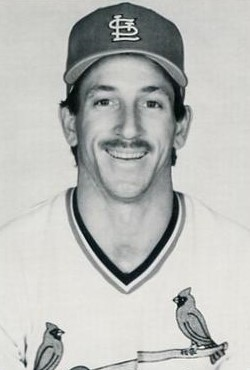
- Pitcher
- Born: November 14, 1962 (age 63); Oklahoma City, Oklahoma, U.S.
- Batted: Left Threw: Left

MLB debut
- August 11, 1987, for the St. Louis Cardinals

Last MLB appearance
- October 2, 1988, for the St. Louis Cardinals

MLB statistics
- Win–loss record: 3–3
- Earned run average: 5.25
- Strikeouts: 41
- Stats at Baseball Reference

Teams
- St. Louis Cardinals (1987–1988)
Medals
Baseball
Representing the United States
Amateur World Series
Bronze medal – third place	1984 Cuba	Team

Steven Bradley Peters (born November 14, 1962) is an American former Major League Baseball pitcher.

Peters started playing baseball at age 6 with his older brother Kenny, who would later go on to play college baseball at Seminole State College and Pan American. Peters attended Moore High School where in 1981 he was named The Oklahoman's State Player of the Year as a pitcher and outfielder. He began his college career at Seminole before transferring to the University of Oklahoma.

At Oklahoma, he set a school record by winning 14 games in 1985. This record stood until it was tied in 1994 and broken in 1995 by Mark Redman.

Peters pitched in 56 games in 1987 and 1988 for the St. Louis Cardinals. One highlight of Peters' brief major league career occurred on October 2, 1987, when he picked up his only save.

== Sources ==
- Career statistics from Baseball Reference · Baseball Reference (Minors) · Retrosheet · Baseball Almanac
