= Randy Hunt (baseball) =

American baseball player (born 1960)

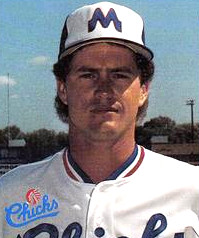
- Hunt in 1988
- Catcher
- Born: January 3, 1960 (age 66); Prattville, Alabama, U.S.
- Batted: Right Threw: Right

MLB debut
- June 4, 1985, for the St. Louis Cardinals

Last MLB appearance
- October 5, 1986, for the Montreal Expos

MLB statistics
- Batting average: .194
- Home runs: 2
- Runs batted in: 6
- Stats at Baseball Reference

Teams
- St. Louis Cardinals (1985); Montreal Expos (1986)

James Randall Hunt (born January 3, 1960) is an American former professional baseball catcher. He played in Major League Baseball (MLB) for the St. Louis Cardinals and Montreal Expos.

Hunt was raised in Alabama by his parents, Harold and Thelma Hunt. He attended Robert E. Lee High School in Montgomery, Alabama where he played several sports. According to the Montgomery Advertiser, he "came mighty close to signing a football scholarship at Troy State" but chose instead to play college baseball at Chattahoochee Valley Junior College. At Chattahoochee, he was converted to catcher and, after two years, continued his college baseball career at Alabama.

He was selected in the Major League Baseball draft after each of his three college seasons and finally signed with the St. Louis Cardinals, who selected him in 1981 after his first season at Alabama. Hunt began to develop a drinking problem toward the end of the 1982 season but eventually won "a six-month bout with alcoholism" in 1983 after seeking help for himself, at which point he began advancing through the minor league system.

In June 1985, following an injury to catcher Darrell Porter, Hunt was called up to the Cardinals. On June 4, he recorded a hit in his first Major League at bat.

He had three hits in 19 at-bats in a total of 14 games. He moved to the Montreal Expos in the 1986 season. Hunt played in 21 games in 1986, with ten hits in 48 at-bats.

In a two-season career, he had a batting average of .194, with two career home runs and six RBI.
