= Jeff Lahti =

American baseball player (born 1956)

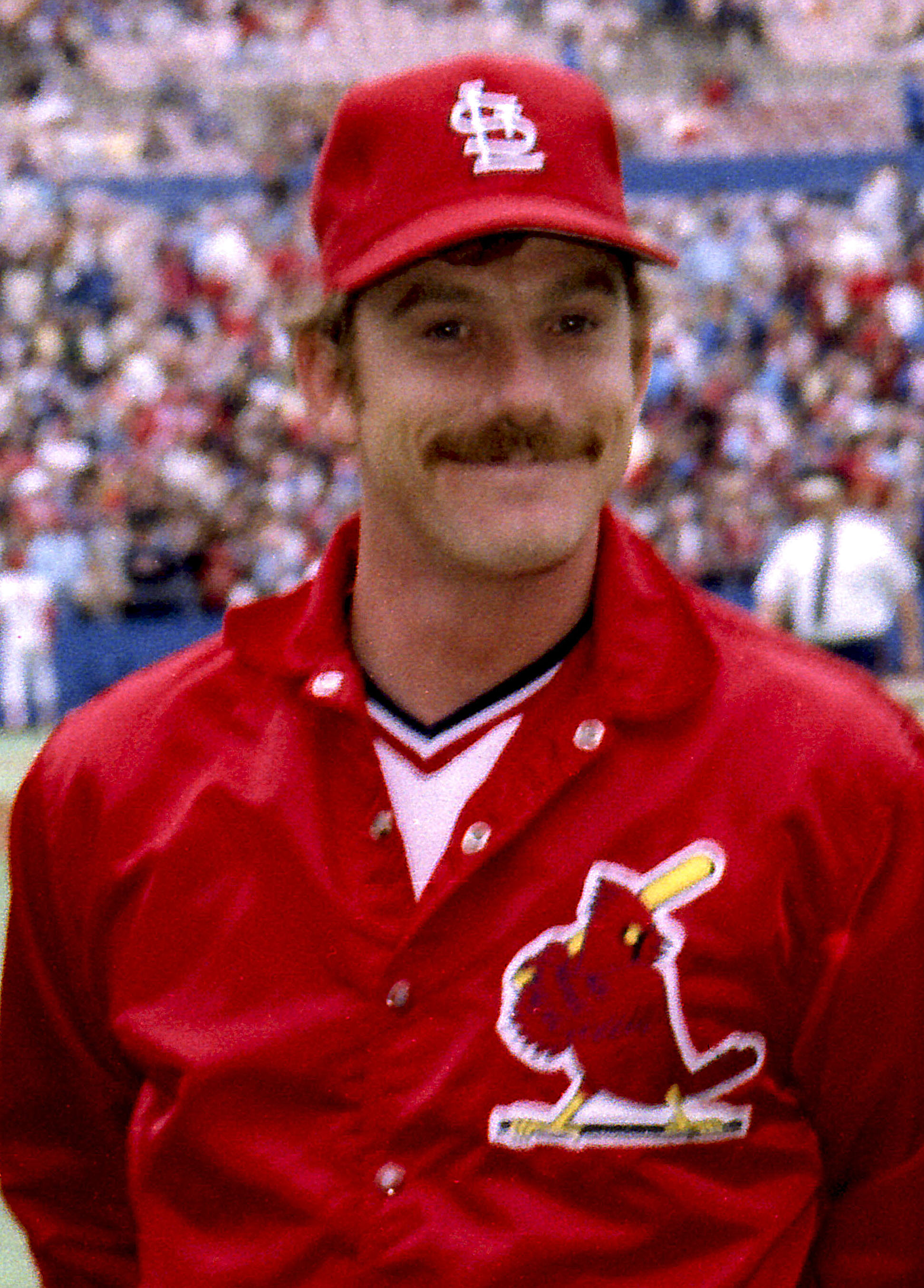
- Lahti with the St. Louis Cardinals in 1983
- Pitcher
- Born: October 8, 1956 (age 69); Oregon City, Oregon, U.S.
- Batted: Right Threw: Right

MLB debut
- June 27, 1982, for the St. Louis Cardinals

Last MLB appearance
- April 24, 1986, for the St. Louis Cardinals

MLB statistics
- Win–loss record: 17–11
- Earned run average: 3.12
- Strikeouts: 137
- Saves: 20
- Stats at Baseball Reference

Teams
- St. Louis Cardinals (1982–1986)

Career highlights and awards
- World Series champion (1982)

Jeffrey Allen Lahti (born October 8, 1956) is an American former Major League Baseball pitcher. He is an alumnus of Portland State University.

== Early life ==
Lahti was born in Oregon City on October 8, 1956, to parents Marlene and Bob. Following their divorce, Marlene married Fred Lahti in Astoria. He attended Hood River Valley High School where he earned first-team All State honors as a pitcher. In 1973, Lahti set the school record for most strikeouts in a season with 70. He graduated from Hood River Valley High School in 1975.

Lahti attended Treasure Valley Community College before being recruited for Portland State University by Jack Dunn.

== Playing career ==
Drafted by the Cincinnati Reds in the 5th round of the 1978 MLB amateur draft, Lahti made his Major League Baseball debut with the St. Louis Cardinals on June 27, 1982, and appeared in his final game on April 24, 1986.

Lahti was a member of the St. Louis Cardinals team that defeated the Milwaukee Brewers in the 1982 World Series. He spent his entire career with the Cardinals. He led the 1985 Cardinal team that went to the World Series in saves a year after the departure of relief ace Bruce Sutter. He went 5–2 with a 1.84 ERA in 1985. He was forced into retirement due to injuries and turned to coaching. In 2016, Lahti was appointed the manager of the Portland Pickles.
