= Ken Dayley =

American baseball player (born 1959)

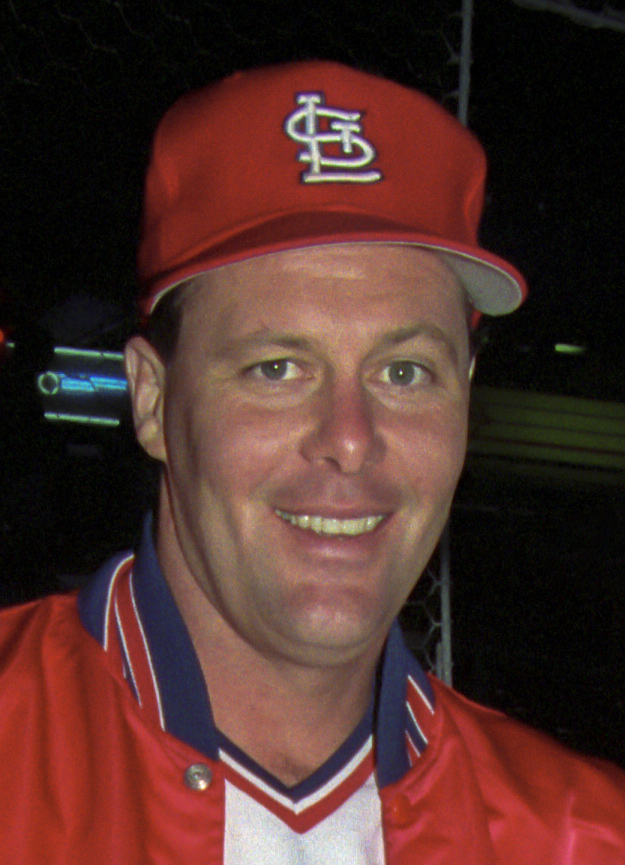
- Dayley with the St. Louis Cardinals
- Pitcher
- Born: February 25, 1959 (age 66); Jerome, Idaho, U.S.
- Batted: Left Threw: Left

MLB debut
- May 13, 1982, for the Atlanta Braves

Last MLB appearance
- April 14, 1993, for the Toronto Blue Jays

MLB statistics
- Win–loss record: 33–45
- Earned run average: 3.64
- Strikeouts: 406
- Stats at Baseball Reference

Teams
- Atlanta Braves (1982–1984); St. Louis Cardinals (1984–1990); Toronto Blue Jays (1991, 1993)

Kenneth Grant Dayley (born February 25, 1959) is an American former professional baseball player. A left-handed pitcher, Dayley played all or part of eleven seasons in Major League Baseball between 1982 and 1993.

== Career ==
=== Braves ===
After pitching at the University of Portland, Dayley was selected in the first round, as the third pick overall, of the 1980 amateur draft by Atlanta Braves. He made his Major League Baseball debut with the Braves on May 13, 1982. During his Braves career, he was used as a swingman, both starting and relieving.

=== Cardinals ===
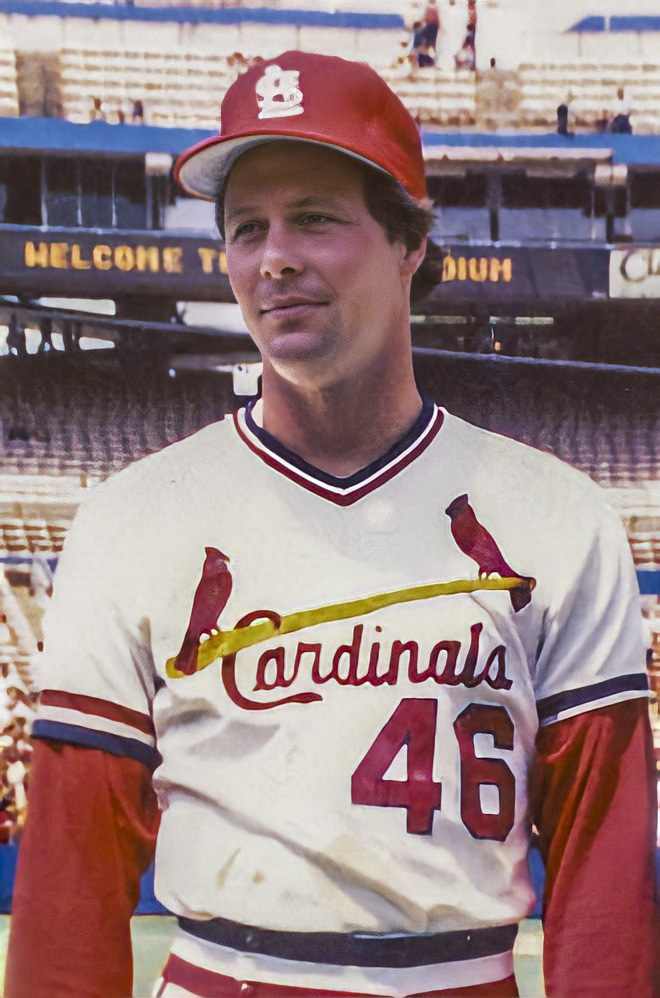

Dayley was traded along with Mike Jorgensen to the St. Louis Cardinals on June 15, 1984, for Ken Oberkfell. After spending most of the rest of that season in the minor leagues, he made it to the majors to stay in 1985, where he was converted to being a full-time relief pitcher. That would remain his role for the remainder of his MLB career, as he never started another game in the majors.

He was released, then re-signed by the Cardinals following the 1986 season, then pitched for them through 1990, after which he was granted free agency.

==== Postseason record ====
While with the Cardinals, Dayley had a statistically stellar postseason record. In four postseason series in 1985 and 1987, Dayley appeared in 16 games, pitching 20.2 innings. He won one game, saved five, and posted an earned run average of just 0.44. He struck out 15 batters while giving up just 12 baserunners, including just six hits. The only run he gave up, however, was a big one.

In Game 6 of the 1987 World Series, With the Minnesota Twins already leading 6–5 in the sixth inning, Dayley was brought in to face left-handed hitter Kent Hrbek with the bases loaded and two out. Dayley's first pitch was deposited over the center field fence for a grand slam. That gave the Twins a 10–5 lead, and they would go on to win the game 11–5, then win Game 7 as well to send the Cardinals to their second World Series loss in three years.

=== Remaining career ===
Ken signed with Toronto Blue Jays in November 1990. Ken made eight relief appearances in 1991, but his season was cut short by injuries, most notably a bout with vertigo from which he never really recovered. He pitched in just four games in 1992, all in the minors.

He opened the 1993 season with the Jays, but was released on April 15. Five days later, Dodgers signed him to a minor league contract. Pitching for the Albuquerque Dukes, he appeared in nine games, giving up 14 hits and 12 walks in just 10.1 innings, before being released on June 22, ending his professional career.
