= 1985 New York Mets season =

1985 New York Mets
- League: National League
- Division: East
- Ballpark: Shea Stadium
- City: New York
- Record: 98–64 (.605)
- Divisional place: 2nd
- Owners: Nelson Doubleday, Jr.
- General manager: Frank Cashen
- Manager: Davey Johnson
- Television: WOR-TV 9 (Ralph Kiner, Steve Zabriskie, Tim McCarver); SportsChannel New York (Ralph Kiner, Tim McCarver, Fran Healy)
- Radio: WHN–AM 1050 (Bob Murphy, Gary Thorne, Juan Alicea (SP))

The 1985 New York Mets season was the 24th regular season for the Mets. They went 98–64 and finished second in the National League East; the team stayed in contention to win the division title until the last week of the season, battling the St. Louis Cardinals in a bitter race until the Cards survived by 3 games. They were managed by Davey Johnson. They played their home games at Shea Stadium.

== Offseason ==
- December 3, 1984: Lou Thornton was drafted from the Mets by the Toronto Blue Jays in the rule 5 draft.
- December 10, 1984: Hubie Brooks, Mike Fitzgerald, Herm Winningham, and Floyd Youmans were traded by the Mets to the Montreal Expos for Gary Carter.
- January 3, 1985: Rusty Staub was signed as a free agent by the Mets.
- January 18, 1985: The Mets traded Tim Leary to the Milwaukee Brewers as part of a 4-team trade. The Kansas City Royals sent Frank Wills to the Mets. The Texas Rangers traded Danny Darwin and a player to be named later to the Brewers. The Brewers sent Jim Sundberg to the Royals. The Royals sent Don Slaught to the Rangers. The Rangers completed the deal by sending Bill Nance (minors) to the Brewers on January 30.
- February 2, 1985: Rick Anderson was signed as a free agent with the New York Mets.

== Regular season ==
- Gary Carter led the Mets in HR and RBI.
- July 4, 1985: Keith Hernandez hit for the cycle in a 16–13 game that lasted 19 innings vs. the Atlanta Braves.
- July 11, 1985: Nolan Ryan got the 4000th strikeout of his career by striking out Mets player Danny Heep.
- July 20, 1985: Darryl Strawberry had 7 RBIs in a game versus the Atlanta Braves.

=== Season standings ===
NL East
Team	W	L	Pct.	GB	Home	Road
St. Louis Cardinals	101	61	.623	—	54‍–‍27	47‍–‍34
New York Mets	98	64	.605	3	51‍–‍30	47‍–‍34
Montreal Expos	84	77	.522	16½	44‍–‍37	40‍–‍40
Chicago Cubs	77	84	.478	23½	41‍–‍39	36‍–‍45
Philadelphia Phillies	75	87	.463	26	41‍–‍40	34‍–‍47
Pittsburgh Pirates	57	104	.354	43½	35‍–‍45	22‍–‍59

=== Record vs. opponents ===
1985 National League record Sources:
Team	ATL	CHC	CIN	HOU	LAD	MON	NYM	PHI	PIT	SD	SF	STL
Atlanta	—	5–7	7–11	8–10	5–13	3–9	2–10	10–2	6–6	7–11	10–8	3–9
Chicago	7–5	—	5–6	5–7	5–7	7–11	4–14	13–5	13–5	8–4	6–6	4–14
Cincinnati	11–7	6–5	—	11–7	7–11	8–4	4–8	7–5	9–3	9–9	12–6	5–7
Houston	10–8	7–5	7–11	—	6–12	6–6	4–8	4–8	6–6	12–6	15–3	6–6
Los Angeles	13–5	7–5	11–7	12–6	—	7–5	7–5	4–8	8–4	8–10	11–7	7–5
Montreal	9–3	11–7	4–8	6–6	5–7	—	9–9	8–10	9–8	5–7	7–5	11–7
New York	10–2	14–4	8–4	8–4	5–7	9–9	—	11–7	10–8	7–5	8–4	8–10
Philadelphia	2-10	5–13	5–7	8–4	8–4	10–8	7–11	—	11–7	5–7	6–6	8–10
Pittsburgh	6–6	5–13	3–9	6–6	4–8	8–9	8–10	7–11	—	4–8	3–9	3–15
San Diego	11–7	4–8	9–9	6–12	10–8	7–5	5–7	7–5	8–4	—	12–6	4–8
San Francisco	8–10	6–6	6–12	3–15	7–11	5–7	4–8	6–6	9–3	6–12	—	2–10
St. Louis	9–3	14–4	7–5	6–6	5–7	7–11	10–8	10–8	15–3	8–4	10–2	—

=== Opening Day starters ===
- Wally Backman, Second Base
- Gary Carter, Catcher
- George Foster, Outfield
- Dwight Gooden, Pitcher
- Keith Hernandez, First Base
- Howard Johnson, Third Base
- Rafael Santana, Shortstop
- Darryl Strawberry, Outfield
- Mookie Wilson, Outfield

=== Notable transactions ===
- June 3, 1985: Gordon Dillard was drafted by the Mets in the 2nd round of the 1985 Major League Baseball draft (secondary phase), but did not sign.

=== Roster ===
1985 New York Mets
Roster
Pitchers: 38 Rick Aguilera; 31 Bruce Berenyi; 12 Ron Darling; 50 Sid Fernandez; 27 Wes Gardner; 16 Dwight Gooden; 29 Tom Gorman; 33,44 Bill Latham; 26 Terry Leach; 36 Ed Lynch; 42 Roger McDowell; 48 Randy Myers; 45 Randy Niemann; 47 Jesse Orosco; 35 Joe Sambito; 40 Calvin Schiraldi; 39 Doug Sisk	Catchers: 8 Gary Carter; 13 Clint Hurdle; 9 Ronn Reynolds; Infielders: 6 Wally Backman; 2 Larry Bowa; 11 Kelvin Chapman; 19 Ron Gardenhire; 17 Keith Hernandez; 20 Howard Johnson; 22 Ray Knight; 3 Rafael Santana	Outfielders: 35 Billy Beane; 21 Terry Blocker; 7 John Christensen; 4 Lenny Dykstra; 15 George Foster; 25 Danny Heep; 44 Tom Paciorek; 10 Rusty Staub; 18 Darryl Strawberry; 1 Mookie Wilson	Manager: 5 Davey Johnson; Coaches: 23 Bud Harrelson; 51 Vern Hoscheit; 28 Bill Robinson; 30 Mel Stottlemyre; 26 Bobby Valentine

== Game log ==
=== Regular season ===
1985 Game Log
Overall: 98–64 (Home: 51–30; Away: 47–34)
April: 12–6 (home: 8–1; away: 4–5)

#	Date	Time (ET)	Opponent	Score	Win	Loss	Save	Time of Game	Attendance	Record	Box/ Streak
1	April 9	1:35 p.m. EST	Cardinals	**W** 6–5 (10)	**Gorman** (1–0)	Allen (0–1)	–	3:42	46,781	1–0	W1
2	April 11	1:35 p.m. EST	Cardinals	**W** 2–1 (11)	**McDowell** (1–0)	Hassler (0–1)	–	3:26	18,864	2–0	W2
3	April 12	8:05 p.m. EST	Reds	**W** 1–0	**Berenyi** (1–0)	Soto (1–1)	**Sisk** (1)	2:24	31,120	3–0	W3
4	April 13	1:35 p.m. EST	Reds	**W** 2–1	**McDowell** (2–0)	Franco (0–1)	–	2:24	26,212	4–0	W4
5	April 14	1:35 p.m. EST	Reds	**W** 4–0	**Gooden** (1–0)	Tibbs (0–2)	–	2:26	30,456	5–0	W5
6	April 15	7:35 p.m. EST	@ Pirates	L 1–4	Bielecki (1–0)	**Latham** (0–1)	Candelaria (2)	2:38	5,575	5–1	L1
7	April 16	7:35 p.m. EST	@ Pirates	**W** 2–1	**Orosco** (1–0)	Candelaria (1–1)	–	2:25	5,879	6–1	W1
8	April 17	7:35 p.m. EST	@ Pirates	**W** 10–6	**Sisk** (1–0)	McWilliams (0–1)	–	3:23	14,029	7–1	W2
9	April 19	8:05 p.m. EST	@ Phillies	**W** 1–0	**Gooden** (2–0)	Hudson (0–1)	**Orosco** (1)	2:12	32,420	8–1	W3
10	April 20	1:20 p.m. EST	@ Phillies	L 6–7	Denny (1–1)	**Lynch** (0–1)	Andersen (1)	2:36	24,013	8–2	L1
11	April 21	1:35 p.m. EST	@ Phillies	L 6–10	Gross (1–2)	**Sisk** (1–1)	–	2:43	30,186	8–3	L2
12	April 22	8:35 p.m. EST	@ Cardinals	**W** 7–6	**Schiraldi** (1–0)	Tudor (0–2)	**Orosco** (2)	2:49	16,324	9–3	W1
13	April 23	8:35 p.m. EST	@ Cardinals	L 3–8	Kepshire (1–2)	**Gorman** (1–1)	–	2:49	13,028	9–4	L1
14	April 24	1:35 p.m. EST	@ Cardinals	L 1–5	Andújar (3–0)	**Gooden** (2–1)	–	2:16	29,282	9–5	L2
15	April 26	8:05 p.m. EST	Pirates	**W** 6–0	**Darling** (1–0)	DeLeón (0–3)	–	2:42	31,846	10–5	W1
16	April 27	1:35 p.m. EST	Pirates	L 2–3	McWilliams (2–1)	**Orosco** (1–1)	Candelaria (4)	2:28	24,786	10–6	L1
17	April 28	1:35 p.m. EDT	Pirates	**W** 5–4 (18)	**Gorman** (2–1)	Tunnell (0–2)	–	5:21	36,423	11–6	W1
18	April 30	7:35 p.m. EDT	Astros	**W** 4–1	**Gooden** (3–1)	Niekro (1–3)	–	2:27	31,558	12–6	W2

May: 15–10 (home: 9–6; away: 6–4)

#	Date	Time (ET)	Opponent	Score	Win	Loss	Save	Time of Game	Attendance	Record	Box/ Streak
19	May 1	7:35 p.m. EDT	Astros	L 3–10	Knepper (2–0)	**Darling** (1–1)	DiPino (3)	2:45	17,973	12–7	L1
20	May 3	7:35 p.m. EDT	@ Reds	**W** 9–4	**Lynch** (1–1)	Soto (4–2)	–	2:50	21,062	13–7	W1
21	May 4	1:15 p.m. EDT	@ Reds	L 2–14	Tibbs (1–4)	**McDowell** (2–1)	–	2:42	21,362	13–8	L1
22	May 5	2:15 p.m. EDT	@ Reds	**W** 3–2	**Gooden** (4–1)	Browning (2–1)	**Orosco** (3)	2:48	20,179	14–8	W1
23	May 7	7:35 p.m. EDT	Braves	**W** 5–3	**Darling** (2–1)	Smith (2–2)	–	2:30	21,342	15–8	W2
24	May 8	7:35 p.m. EDT	Braves	**W** 4–0	**Lynch** (2–1)	Barker (0–3)	–	2:22	20,905	16–8	W3
25	May 10	8:05 p.m. EDT	Phillies	**W** 5–0	**Gooden** (5–1)	Carlton (0–3)	–	2:54	46,143	17–8	W4
26	May 11	1:20 p.m. EDT	Phillies	**W** 4–0	**Fernandez** (1–0)	Rawley (3–3)	**McDowell** (1)	2:50	29,635	18–8	W5
27	May 12	1:35 p.m. EDT	Phillies	**W** 3–2	**Darling** (3–1)	Gross (1–4)	**Orosco** (4)	3:02	32,597	19–8	W6
28	May 13	7:40 p.m. EDT	@ Braves	L 0–1	Barker (1–3)	**Lynch** (2–2)	Sutter (5)	2:29	15,160	19–9	L1
29	May 14	5:40 p.m. EDT	@ Braves	**W** 3–1	**McDowell** (3–1)	Mahler (7–2)	–	2:34	14,212	20–9	W1
30	May 15	8:35 p.m. EDT	@ Astros	**W** 5–3	**Gooden** (6–1)	Niekro (2–4)	**Orosco** (5)	2:47	15,717	21–9	W2
31	May 16	8:35 p.m. EDT	@ Astros	L 0–1	Scott (2–1)	**Fernandez** (1–1)	Smith (5)	2:03	11,796	21–10	L1
32	May 17	8:05 p.m. EDT	Giants	**W** 3–2 (12)	**McDowell** (4–1)	Garrelts (2–3)	–	3:35	23,428	22–10	W1
33	May 18	7:35 p.m. EDT	Giants	L 2–8 (10)	Davis (2–1)	**Gardner** (0–1)	–	2:49	32,646	22–11	L1
34	May 19	1:35 p.m. EDT	Giants	**W** 3–2	**Gorman** (2–1)	Davis (2–2)	**McDowell** (2)	2:26	50,369	23–11	W1
35	May 20	7:35 p.m. EDT	Padres	L 0–2	Hoyt (3–4)	**Gooden** (6–2)	–	2:13	36,672	23–12	L1
—	May 21		Padres	**Postponed (Rain)** (Makeup date: August 23)							
36	May 22	7:35 p.m. EDT	Padres	L 4–5 (10)	Thurmond (2–2)	**Orosco** (1–2)	Gossage (11)	3:01	23,468	23–13	L2
37	May 24	8:05 p.m. EDT	Dodgers	L 3–4	Hershiser (4–0)	**Lynch** (2–3)	Niedenfuer (3)	2:57	37,124	23–14	L3
38	May 25	1:20 p.m. EDT	Dodgers	L 2–6	Valenzuela (5–4)	**Gooden** (6–3)	–	2:35	40,052	23–15	L4
39	May 26	1:35 p.m. EDT	Dodgers	**W** 2–1	**McDowell** (5–1)	Honeycutt (2–5)	–	2:39	36,234	24–15	W1
40	May 27	7:35 p.m. EDT	Dodgers	**W** 8–1	**Darling** (4–1)	Reuss (3–5)	–	2:23	24,458	25–15	W2
41	May 29	3:05 p.m. EDT	@ Giants	**W** 4–3	**Lynch** (3–3)	Davis (2–3)	**McDowell** (3)	2:47	8,974	26–15	W3
42	May 30	3:05 p.m. EDT	@ Giants	**W** 2–1	**Gooden** (7–3)	Gott (2–2)	–	2:38	10,207	27–15	W4
43	May 31	10:05 p.m. EDT	@ Padres	L 3–4	Hoyt (5–4)	**Sisk** (1–2)	–	2:04	54,305	27–16	L1

June: 11–18 (home: 6–5; away: 5–13)

#	Date	Time (ET)	Opponent	Score	Win	Loss	Save	Time of Game	Attendance	Record	Box/ Streak
44	June 1	10:05 p.m. EDT	@ Padres	**W** 5–3	**Darling** (5–1)	Thurmond (2–3)	**Orosco** (6)	2:50	42,447	28–16	W1
45	June 2	4:05 p.m. EDT	@ Padres	**W** 7–3	**Schiraldi** (1–1)	Show (4–3)	**Sisk** (2)	2:22	32,561	29–16	W2
46	June 3	8:20 p.m. EDT	@ Dodgers	L 4–5 (12)	Howe (1–1)	**Sisk** (1–3)	–	3:54	36,935	29–17	L1
47	June 4	10:35 p.m. EDT	@ Dodgers	**W** 4–1	**Gooden** (8–3)	Valenzuela (5–6)	–	2:33	49,386	30–17	W1
48	June 5	10:35 p.m. EDT	@ Dodgers	L 1–2	Welch (1–0)	**Fernandez** (1–2)	Howe (3)	2:56	32,631	30–18	L1
49	June 7	8:05 p.m. EDT	Cardinals	L 2–7 (13)	Campbell (2–1)	**Sisk** (1–4)	–	4:14	34,490	30–19	L2
50	June 8	1:35 p.m. EDT	Cardinals	L 0–1	Tudor (3–7)	**Gorman** (3–2)	–	2:14	36,424	30–20	L3
51 (1)	June 9	1:05 p.m. EDT	Cardinals	**W** 6–1	**Gooden** (9–3)	Forsch (4–4)	–	3:04	–	31–20	W1
52 (2)	June 9	4:44 p.m. EDT	Cardinals	L 2–8	Andújar (11–1)	**Schiraldi** (2–1)	–	2:31	41,431	31–21	L1
53	June 10	7:35 p.m. EDT	@ Phillies	L 4–6	Denny (3–5)	**Fernandez** (1–3)	–	2:33	22,183	31–22	L2
54	June 11	7:35 p.m. EDT	@ Phillies	L 7–26	Hudson (2–6)	**Gorman** (3–3)	–	3:21	22,591	31–23	L3
55	June 12	7:35 p.m. EDT	@ Phillies	**W** 7–3 (11)	**Aguilera** (1–0)	Rucker (1–1)	–	3:25	22,455	32–23	W1
56	June 13	7:35 p.m. EDT	@ Phillies	L 4–5	Rawley (5–5)	**Orosco** (1–3)	–	2:38	23,381	32–24	L1
57	June 14	7:35 p.m. EDT	@ Expos	L 4–5	Lucas (2–0)	**Sisk** (1–5)	–	3:35	35,422	32–25	L2
58	June 15	7:35 p.m. EDT	@ Expos	L 2–3	Burke (2–0)	**Fernandez** (1–4)	–	2:11	33,219	32–26	L3
59	June 16	1:35 p.m. EDT	@ Expos	L 2–7	Gullickson (7–5)	**Aguilera** (1–1)	Mahler (1)	2:58	40,591	32–27	L4
60	June 17	8:20 p.m. EDT	Cubs	**W** 2–0	**Darling** (6–1)	Sutcliffe (6–6)	–	2:30	41,986	33–27	W1
61	June 18	7:35 p.m. EDT	Cubs	**W** 5–1	**Lynch** (4–3)	Trout (6–3)	–	2:10	41,125	34–27	W2
62	June 19	7:35 p.m. EDT	Cubs	**W** 1–0	**Gooden** (10–3)	Sanderson (3–2)	–	2:44	51,778	35–27	W3
63	June 20	1:35 p.m. EDT	Cubs	**W** 5–3	**Fernandez** (2–4)	Fontenot (1–3)	**McDowell** (4)	2:28	37,203	36–27	W4
64	June 21	8:05 p.m. EDT	Expos	**W** 6–3	**Sisk** (2–5)	Mahler (1–1)	–	3:10	38,554	37–27	W5
65	June 22	7:35 p.m. EDT	Expos	L 4–5 (10)	St. Claire (2–1)	**McDowell** (5–2)	–	3:56	51,513	37–28	L1
66	June 23	1:35 p.m. EDT	Expos	L 1–5	Smith (8–3)	**Lynch** (4–4)	–	2:13	44,506	37–29	L2
67	June 25	4:05 p.m. EDT	@ Cubs	**W** 3–2	**Gooden** (11–3)	Sanderson (3–3)	–	2:51	36,730	38–29	W1
68	June 26	4:05 p.m. EDT	@ Cubs	L 3–7	Fontenot (2–3)	**McDowell** (5–3)	Smith (16)	2:33	35,876	38–30	L1
69	June 27	4:05 p.m. EDT	@ Cubs	L 2–4	Sutcliffe (7–6)	**Darling** (6–2)	–	2:28	35,857	38–31	L2
70	June 28	8:35 p.m. EDT	@ Cardinals	L 2–3	Tudor (7–7)	**Lynch** (4–5)	Dayley (6)	2:23	45,929	38–32	L3
71	June 29	8:05 p.m. EDT	@ Cardinals	L 0–6	Andújar (13–3)	**Aguilera** (1–2)	–	2:26	47,891	38–33	L4
72	June 30	2:15 p.m. EDT	@ Cardinals	1–2 (11)	Dayley (2–0)	**Orosco** (1–4)	–	3:04	47,425	38–34	L5

July: 21–7 (home: 11–6; away: 10–1)

#	Date	Time (ET)	Opponent	Score	Win	Loss	Save	Time of Game	Attendance	Record	Box/ Streak
73	July 1	7:35 p.m. EDT	Pirates	L 0–1	Reuschel (6–1)	**Fernandez** (2–5)	Candelaria (8)	2:26	21,610	38–35	L6
74	July 2	7:35 p.m. EDT	Pirates	**W** 5–4	**Darling** (7–2)	McWilliams (4–7)	**McDowell** (5)	2:15	22,651	39–35	W1
75	July 3	7:35 p.m. EDT	Pirates	**W** 6–2	**Lynch** (5–5)	DeLeón (2–11)	–	2:23	46,220	40–35	W2
76	July 4	7:40 p.m. EDT	@ Braves	**W** 16–13 (19)	**Gorman** (4–3)	Camp (2–4)	–	6:10	44,947	41–35	W3
77	July 5	7:40 p.m. EDT	@ Braves	**W** 6–1	**Aguilera** (2–2)	Pérez (0–6)	–	2:40	28,085	42–35	W4
—	July 6		@ Braves	**Postponed (Rain)** (Makeup date: July 7)							
78 (1)	July 7	1:10 p.m. EDT	@ Braves	**W** 4–0	**Fernandez** (3–5)	Smith (5–5)	**McDowell** (6)	2:37	–	43–35	W5
79 (2)	July 7	4:22 p.m. EDT	@ Braves	**W** 8–5	**Darling** (8–2)	Dedmon (4–1)	**Orosco** (7)	3:29	26,757	44–35	W6
80	July 8	8:20 p.m. EDT	@ Reds	**W** 7–5	**Lynch** (6–5)	Tibbs (4–11)	**Orosco** (8)	2:52	20,391	45–35	W7
81	July 9	7:35 p.m. EDT	@ Reds	**W** 11–2	**Gooden** (12–3)	Soto (8–9)	–	2:50	21,787	46–35	W8
82	July 10	7:35 p.m. EDT	@ Reds	**W** 2–1	**Aguilera** (3–2)	Browning (7–7)	–	2:25	18,958	47–35	W9
83	July 11	8:35 p.m. EDT	@ Astros	L 3–4 (12)	Smith (5–3)	**Gorman** (4–4)	–	3:44	20,921	47–36	L1
84	July 12	8:35 p.m. EDT	@ Astros	**W** 3–2 (10)	**Darling** (9–2)	Mathis (3–5)	**McDowell** (7)	3:04	21,035	48–36	W1
85	July 13	8:35 p.m. EDT	@ Astros	**W** 10–1	**Lynch** (7–5)	Knudson (0–2)	–	2:58	23,234	49–36	W2
86	July 14	7:05 p.m. EDT	@ Astros	**W** 1–0	**Gooden** (13–3)	Knepper (8–6)	–	2:35	15,117	50–36	W3
**56th All-Star Game in Minneapolis, MN**
87	July 18	7:35 p.m. EDT	Braves	**W** 7–6	**Darling** (10–2)	Mahler (13–8)	**Orosco** (9)	3:02	30,496	51–36	W1
88	July 19	8:05 p.m. EDT	Braves	L 0–1	Smith (6–5)	**Aguilera** (3–3)	Sutter (16)	2:13	36,572	51–37	L1
89	July 20	4:05 p.m. EDT	Braves	**W** 16–4	**Gooden** (14–3)	Bedrosian (5–8)	–	2:45	35,650	52–37	W1
90	July 21	1:35 p.m. EDT	Braves	**W** 15–10	**Leach** (1–0)	Pérez (1–8)	–	2:51	50,876	53–37	W2
91	July 22	7:35 p.m. EDT	Reds	L 1–5	Soto (9–11)	**Fernandez** (3–6)	–	2:36	27,471	53–38	L1
92	July 23	7:35 p.m. EDT	Reds	L 0–4	Browning (8–7)	**Darling** (10–3)	–	2:22	34,720	53–39	L2
93	July 24	1:35 p.m. EDT	Reds	L 2–3	Franco (9–1)	**McDowell** (5–4)	Power (18)	2:42	30,154	53–40	L3
94	July 25	7:35 p.m. EDT	Astros	**W** 6–3	**Gooden** (15–3)	Scott (9–5)	–	2:39	28,421	54–40	W1
—	July 26		Astros	**Postponed (Rain)** (Makeup date: July 27)							
95 (1)	July 27	5:35 p.m. EDT	Astros	**W** 16–4	**Orosco** (2–4)	DiPino (1–6)	–	3:03	–	55–40	W2
96 (2)	July 27	9:13 p.m. EDT	Astros	**W** 7–3	**Latham** (1–1)	Kerfeld (0–1)	**Orosco** (10)	2:55	51,284	56–40	W3
97	July 28	1:35 p.m. EDT	Astros	L 4–12	Niekro (8–8)	**Darling** (10–4)	–	3:05	34,298	56–41	L1
98	July 29	7:35 p.m. EDT	Expos	**W** 3–2	**Aguilera** (4–3)	Smith (12–4)	**Orosco** (11)	2:28	30,693	57–41	W1
99	July 30	7:35 p.m. EDT	Expos	**W** 2–0	**Gooden** (16–3)	Gullickson (10–7)	–	2:39	45,118	58–41	W2
100	July 31	1:35 p.m. EDT	Expos	**W** 5–2	**Lynch** (7–5)	Schatzeder (2–4)	**McDowell** (8)	2:25	26,055	59–41	W3

August: 17–11 (home: 10–6; away: 7–5)

#	Date	Time (ET)	Opponent	Score	Win	Loss	Save	Time of Game	Attendance	Record	Box/ Streak
101	August 2	4:05 p.m. EDT	@ Cubs	L 1–2	Eckersley (8–5)	**Leach** (1–1)	Brusstar (4)	2:43	35,419	59–42	L1
102	August 3	4:05 p.m. EDT	@ Cubs	**W** 5–4 (10)	**Orosco** (3–4)	Frazier (6–5)	**McDowell** (9)	3:20	36,775	60–42	W1
103	August 4	2:20 p.m. EDT	@ Cubs	**W** 4–1	**Gooden** (17–3)	Fontenot (4–6)	–	2:22	35,207	61–42	W2
104	August 5	4:05 p.m. EDT	@ Cubs	**W** 7–2	**Lynch** (9–5)	Botelho (0–1)	–	3:00	34,167	62–42	W3
—	August 6		@ Expos	**Postponed (Strike)** (Makeup date: September 13)							
—	August 7		@ Expos	**Postponed (Strike)** (Makeup date: August 19)							
105	August 8	7:35 p.m. EDT	@ Expos	**W** 14–7	**Aguilera** (5–3)	Hesketh (9–5)	**Leach** (1)	3:05	24,919	63–42	W4
106	August 9	8:05 p.m. EDT	Cubs	**W** 6–4	**McDowell** (6–4)	Brusstar (2–2)	–	2:58	44,309	64–42	W5
107	August 10	1:20 p.m. EDT	Cubs	**W** 8–3	**Gooden** (18–3)	Fontenot (4–7)	–	2:32	48,306	65–42	W6
108	August 11	1:35 p.m. EDT	Cubs	**W** 6–2	**Lynch** (10–5)	Botelho (0–2)	–	2:33	40,311	66–42	W7
109	August 12	7:35 p.m. EDT	Phillies	**W** 4–3	**Fernandez** (4–6)	Denny (7–9)	**Orosco** (12)	2:32	26,577	67–42	W8
110	August 13	7:35 p.m. EDT	Phillies	**W** 4–2	**Aguilera** (6–3)	Hudson (5–11)	**Orosco** (13)	2:48	31,186	68–42	W9
111	August 14	7:35 p.m. EDT	Phillies	L 1–2	Gross (12–9)	**Darling** (10–5)	Carman (5)	2:45	31,549	68–43	L1
112	August 15	1:35 p.m. EDT	Phillies	**W** 10–7	**Orosco** (4–4)	Carman (4–4)	–	3:28	36,663	69–43	W1
113	August 16	7:35 p.m. EDT	@ Pirates	L 1–7	Rhoden (7–13)	**Lynch** (10–6)	–	2:47	9,289	69–44	L1
114	August 17	7:05 p.m. EDT	@ Pirates	**W** 4–3	**Fernandez** (5–6)	Tunnell (1–8)	**McDowell** (10)	2:30	10,200	70–44	W1
115	August 18	1:35 p.m. EDT	@ Pirates	L 0–5	Robinson (3–8)	**Aguilera** (6–4)	Clements (1)	2:22	14,508	70–45	L1
116	August 19	7:35 p.m. EDT	@ Expos	**W** 1–0	**Darling** (11–5)	Burke (8–1)	**McDowell** (11)	2:31	30,009	71–45	W1
116	August 20	7:35 p.m. EDT	Giants	**W** 3–0	**Gooden** (19–3)	Gott (4–9)	–	2:45	31,758	72–45	W2
117	August 21	7:35 p.m. EDT	Giants	L 2–3	LaPoint (6–11)	**McDowell** (6–5)	Garrelts (10)	2:12	22,450	72–46	L1
118	August 22	7:35 p.m. EDT	Giants	**W** 7–0	**Leach** (2–1)	Blue (5–8)	–	2:24	24,536	73–46	W1
120 (1)	August 23	5:35 p.m. EDT	Padres	L 1–6	Thurmond (5–7)	**Aguilera** (6–5)	Lefferts (2)	2:45	–	73–47	L1
121 (2)	August 23	8:55 p.m. EDT	Padres	L 0–3	Jackson (2–2)	**Fernandez** (5–7)	McCullers (4)	2:47	45,156	73–48	L2
122	August 24	7:35 p.m. EDT	Padres	**W** 5–1	**Darling** (12–5)	Dravecky (11–8)	**Orosco** (14)	2:32	40,863	74–48	W1
123	August 25	1:35 p.m. EDT	Padres	**W** 9–3	**Gooden** (20–3)	Show (9–8)	**McDowell** (12)	2:45	37,350	75–48	W2
124	August 26	7:35 p.m. EDT	Dodgers	L 1–6	Valenzuela (16–8)	**Lynch** (10–7)	–	2:47	43,063	75–49	L1
125	August 27	7:35 p.m. EDT	Dodgers	L 1–2	Reuss (12–8)	**Fernandez** (5–8)	Niedenfuer (14)	2:42	42,764	75–50	L2
126	August 29	3:05 p.m. EDT	@ Giants	L 3–6 (10)	Garrelts (8–3)	**Leach** (2–2)	–	3:32	6,065	75–51	L3
127	August 30	10:35 p.m. EDT	@ Giants	**W** 2–1	**Darling** (13–5)	Krukow (8–10)	–	2:20	6,646	76–51	W1
128	August 31	4:05 p.m. EDT	@ Giants	L 2–3	Gott (5–10)	**Gooden** (20–4)	Davis (7)	2:32	20,334	76–52	L1

September: 19–9 (home: 6–4; away: 13–5)

#	Date	Time (ET)	Opponent	Score	Win	Loss	Save	Time of Game	Attendance	Record	Box/ Streak
129	September 1	4:05 p.m. EDT	@ Giants	**W** 4–3	**Sisk** (3–5)	Davis (4–8)	**Orosco** (15)	2:42	9,975	77–52	W1
130	September 2	9:05 p.m. EDT	@ Padres	**W** 12–4	**Fernandez** (6–7)	Thurmond (6–8)	–	2:43	26,306	78–52	W2
131	September 3	10:05 p.m. EDT	@ Padres	**W** 8–3	**Aguilera** (7–5)	Dravecky (11–9)	–	2:34	14,960	79–52	W3
132	September 4	10:05 p.m. EDT	@ Padres	**W** 9–2	**Darling** (14–5)	Jackson (2–3)	–	2:56	15,676	80–52	W4
133	September 6	10:35 p.m. EDT	@ Dodgers	**W** 2–0 (13)	**Orosco** (5–4)	Niedenfuer (6–5)	–	3:47	51,868	81–52	W5
134	September 7	3:20 p.m. EDT	@ Dodgers	L 6–7	Niedenfuer (7–5)	**Leach** (2–3)	–	3:11	44,444	81–53	L1
135	September 8	4:05 p.m. EDT	@ Dodgers	**W** 4–3 (14)	**Sisk** (4–5)	Diaz (4–3)	–	4:58	43,838	82–53	W1
136	September 10	7:35 p.m. EDT	Cardinals	**W** 5–4	**Darling** (15–5)	Cox (15–9)	**McDowell** (13)	2:34	50,195	83–53	W2
137	September 11	7:35 p.m. EDT	Cardinals	L 0–1 (10)	Tudor (18–6)	**Orosco** (5–5)	–	3:03	52,616	83–54	L1
138	September 12	7:35 p.m. EDT	Cardinals	**W** 7–6	**Orosco** (6–5)	Dayley (3–2)	–	3:16	46,295	84–54	W1
139 (1)	September 13	5:35 p.m. EDT	@ Expos	L 1–5	Smith (18–5)	**Aguilera** (7–6)	–	2:41	–	84–55	L1
140 (2)	September 13	8:51 p.m. EDT	@ Expos	**W** 7–2	**Leach** (3–3)	Schatzeder (2–5)	**McDowell** (14)	3:07	25,524	85–55	W1
141	September 14	3:20 p.m. EDT	@ Expos	L 1–5	Palmer (7–9)	**Fernandez** (6–9)	Reardon (35)	2:45	20,579	85–56	L1
142	September 15	1:35 p.m. EDT	@ Expos	**W** 6–2	**Darling** (16–5)	Dopson (0–2)	**Orosco** (16)	2:40	26,588	86–56	W1
143	September 16	7:35 p.m. EDT	Phillies	**W** 9–0	**Gooden** (21–4)	Gross (14–10)	–	2:35	30,606	87–56	W2
144	September 17	7:35 p.m. EDT	Phillies	L 1–5	Rawley (12–7)	**Lynch** (10–8)	–	2:16	22,440	87–57	L1
145	September 18	7:35 p.m. EDT	Cubs	**W** 4–2	**Aguilera** (8–6)	Trout (8–6)	**McDowell** (15)	2:50	25,424	88–57	W1
146	September 19	7:35 p.m. EDT	Cubs	**W** 5–1	**Fernandez** (7–9)	Fontenot (6–9)	–	2:53	26,812	89–57	W2
147	September 20	8:05 p.m. EDT	Pirates	L 5–7 (11)	Guante (4–5)	**Latham** (1–2)	DeLeón (1)	4:09	33,803	89–58	L1
148	September 21	1:20 p.m. EDT	Pirates	**W** 12–1	**Gooden** (22–4)	Rhoden (9–14)	–	2:51	49,931	90–58	W1
149	September 22	1:35 p.m. EDT	Pirates	L 3–5	Kipper (1–1)	**Leach** (3–4)	Clements (2)	2:34	35,679	90–59	L1
150	September 23	7:35 p.m. EDT	@ Phillies	**W** 4–1	**Aguilera** (9–6)	Toliver (0–2)	**McDowell** (16)	3:10	15,295	91–59	W1
151	September 24	12:35 p.m. EDT	@ Phillies	**W** 7–1	**Fernandez** (8–9)	Rucker (3–2)	–	2:42	14,398	92–59	W2
152	September 25	2:20 p.m. EDT	@ Cubs	L 4–5	Smith (7–4)	**Orosco** (6–6)	–	2:41	10,339	92–60	L1
153	September 26	2:20 p.m. EDT	@ Cubs	**W** 3–0	**Gooden** (23–4)	Abrego (1–1)	–	2:52	11,091	93–60	W1
154	September 27	7:35 p.m. EDT	@ Pirates	L 7–8	McWilliams (6–8)	**Gardner** (0–2)	DeLeón (2)	2:58	4,843	93–61	L1
155	September 28	3:20 p.m. EDT	@ Pirates	**W** 3–1	**Aguilera** (10–6)	Kipper (1–2)	**Orosco** (17)	3:07	4,410	94–61	W1
156	September 29	1:35 p.m. EDT	@ Pirates	**W** 9–7 (10)	**Orosco** (7–6)	McWilliams (6–9)	–	3:28	13,956	95–61	W2

October: 3–3 (home: 1–2; away: 2–1)

#	Date	Time (ET)	Opponent	Score	Win	Loss	Save	Time of Game	Attendance	Record	Box/ Streak
157	October 1	8:35 p.m. EDT	@ Cardinals	**W** 1–0 (11)	**Orosco** (8–6)	Dayley (4–4)	–	3:22	46,026	96–61	W3
158	October 2	8:35 p.m. EDT	@ Cardinals	**W** 5–2	**Gooden** (24–4)	Andújar (21–11)	–	3:07	47,333	97–61	W4
159	October 3	8:35 p.m. EDT	@ Cardinals	L 3–4	Cox (18–9)	**Aguilera** (10–7)	Lahti (19)	3:11	47,720	97–62	L1
160	October 4	8:05 p.m. EDT	Expos	**W** 9–4	**Fernandez** (9–9)	Gullickson (14–12)	**McDowell** (17)	2:36	30,910	98–62	W1
161	October 5	2:20 p.m. EDT	Expos	L 3–8	Youmans (4–3)	**Darling** (16–6)	Reardon (40)	2:46	45,404	98–63	L1
162	October 6	1:35 p.m. EDT	Expos	L 1–2	Schatzeder (3–5)	**Latham** (1–3)	Reardon (41)	1:57	31,890	98–64	L2

*An MLB Players strike forced the cancellation of all regular season games on August 6 and 7. Most games were made up later in the season.
Legend: = Win = Loss = Postponement = Eliminated
Bold = Mets team member

== Player stats ==
=== Batting ===
==== Starters by position ====
Note: Pos = Position; G = Games played; AB = At bats; H = Hits; Avg. = Batting average; HR = Home runs; RBI = Runs batted in

Pos	Player	G	AB	H	Avg.	HR	RBI
C	Gary Carter	149	555	156	.281	32	100
1B	Keith Hernandez	158	593	183	.309	10	91
2B	Wally Backman	145	520	142	.273	1	38
3B	Howard Johnson	126	389	94	.242	11	46
SS	Rafael Santana	154	529	136	.257	1	29
LF	George Foster	129	452	119	.263	21	77
CF	Mookie Wilson	93	337	93	.276	6	26
RF	Darryl Strawberry	111	393	109	.277	29	79

==== Other batters ====
Note: G = Games played; AB = At bats; H = Hits; Avg. = Batting average; HR = Home runs; RBI = Runs batted in

Player	G	AB	H	Avg.	HR	RBI
Danny Heep	95	271	76	.280	7	42
Ray Knight	90	271	59	.218	6	36
Lenny Dykstra	83	236	60	.254	1	19
Kelvin Chapman	62	144	25	.174	0	7
Tom Paciorek	46	116	33	.284	1	11
John Christensen	51	113	21	.186	3	13
Clint Hurdle	43	82	16	.195	3	7
Rusty Staub	54	45	12	.267	1	8
Ronn Reynolds	28	43	9	.209	0	1
Ron Gardenhire	26	39	7	.179	0	2
Larry Bowa	14	19	2	.105	0	2
Terry Blocker	18	15	1	.067	0	0
Billy Beane	8	8	2	.250	0	1

=== Pitching ===
= Indicates league leader

==== Starting pitchers ====
Note: G = Games played; GS = Games started; CG = Complete games; SHO = Shutouts; IP = Innings pitched; W = Wins; L = Losses; ERA = Earned run average; SO = Strikeouts

Player	G	GS	CG	SHO	IP	W	L	ERA	SO
Dwight Gooden	35	35	16	8	276.2	24	4	1.53	268
Ron Darling	36	35	4	2	248.0	16	6	2.90	167
Ed Lynch	31	29	6	1	191.0	10	8	3.44	65
Sid Fernandez	26	26	3	0	170.1	9	9	2.80	180
Rick Aguilera	21	19	2	0	122.1	10	7	3.24	74
Bruce Berenyi	3	3	0	0	13.2	1	0	2.63	10

==== Other pitchers ====
Note: G = Games pitched; IP = Innings pitched; W = Wins; L = Losses; ERA = Earned run average; SO = Strikeouts

Player	G	IP	W	L	ERA	SO
Terry Leach	22	55.2	3	4	2.97	30
Calvin Schiraldi	10	26.1	2	1	8.89	21
Bill Latham	7	22.2	1	3	3.97	10

==== Relief pitchers ====
Note: G = Games pitched; W = Wins; L = Losses; SV = Saves; ERA = Earned run average; SO = Strikeouts

Player	G	W	L	SV	ERA	SO
Roger McDowell	62	6	5	17	2.83	70
Jesse Orosco	54	8	6	17	2.73	68
Doug Sisk	42	4	5	2	5.30	26
Tom Gorman	34	4	4	0	5.13	32
Wes Gardner	9	0	2	0	5.25	11
Joe Sambito	8	0	0	0	12.66	3
Randy Niemann	4	0	0	0	0.00	2
Randy Myers	1	0	0	0	0.00	2

== Awards and honors ==
- Dwight Gooden, Associated Press Athlete of the Year
- Dwight Gooden, National League Cy Young Award Winner
- Dwight Gooden, National League Pitching Triple Crown
- Dwight Gooden, The Sporting News Pitcher of the Year
- Keith Hernandez, National League First Base Gold Glove
- Gary Carter, National League Catcher Silver Slugger
- Keith Hernandez – Player of the Month, July 1985
- Keith Hernandez – Hernandez set a major league record for game-winning runs batted in (24) in 1985
- Gary Carter – Player of the Month, September 1985
- Rafael Santana – Led NL Shortstops in Putouts (301)

All-Star Game

- Darryl Strawberry, right field, starter
- Gary Carter, catcher
- Ron Darling, pitcher
- Dwight Gooden, pitcher (Injured, did not play)

== Farm system ==
Level	Team	League	Manager
AAA	Tidewater Tides	International League	Bob Schaefer
AA	Jackson Mets	Texas League	Sam Perlozzo
A	Lynchburg Mets	Carolina League	Mike Cubbage
A	Columbia Mets	South Atlantic League	Bud Harrelson and Rich Miller
A-Short Season	Little Falls Mets	New York–Penn League	Dan Radison
Rookie	Kingsport Mets	Appalachian League	Tucker Ashford

LEAGUE CHAMPIONS: Tidewater, Jackson
