= 1985 Philadelphia Phillies season =

1985 Philadelphia Phillies
- League: National League
- Division: East
- Ballpark: Veterans Stadium
- City: Philadelphia
- Owners: Bill Giles
- General managers: Bill Giles
- Managers: John Felske
- Television: WTAF; PRISM
- Radio: WCAU (Harry Kalas, Richie Ashburn, Andy Musser, Chris Wheeler)

The 1985 season was the Philadelphia Phillies 103rd season. The Phillies finished in fifth place in the National League East with a record of 75 wins and 87 losses. It was the first time the team finished below .500 since going 80–82 in 1974.

== Offseason ==
- November 9, 1984: Steve Fireovid was released by the Phillies.
- February 4, 1985: Al Oliver was traded by the Phillies to the Los Angeles Dodgers for Pat Zachry.

== Regular season ==
=== Season standings ===
NL East
Team	W	L	Pct.	GB	Home	Road
St. Louis Cardinals	101	61	.623	—	54‍–‍27	47‍–‍34
New York Mets	98	64	.605	3	51‍–‍30	47‍–‍34
Montreal Expos	84	77	.522	16½	44‍–‍37	40‍–‍40
Chicago Cubs	77	84	.478	23½	41‍–‍39	36‍–‍45
Philadelphia Phillies	75	87	.463	26	41‍–‍40	34‍–‍47
Pittsburgh Pirates	57	104	.354	43½	35‍–‍45	22‍–‍59

=== Record vs. opponents ===
1985 National League record Sources:
Team	ATL	CHC	CIN	HOU	LAD	MON	NYM	PHI	PIT	SD	SF	STL
Atlanta	—	5–7	7–11	8–10	5–13	3–9	2–10	10–2	6–6	7–11	10–8	3–9
Chicago	7–5	—	5–6	5–7	5–7	7–11	4–14	13–5	13–5	8–4	6–6	4–14
Cincinnati	11–7	6–5	—	11–7	7–11	8–4	4–8	7–5	9–3	9–9	12–6	5–7
Houston	10–8	7–5	7–11	—	6–12	6–6	4–8	4–8	6–6	12–6	15–3	6–6
Los Angeles	13–5	7–5	11–7	12–6	—	7–5	7–5	4–8	8–4	8–10	11–7	7–5
Montreal	9–3	11–7	4–8	6–6	5–7	—	9–9	8–10	9–8	5–7	7–5	11–7
New York	10–2	14–4	8–4	8–4	5–7	9–9	—	11–7	10–8	7–5	8–4	8–10
Philadelphia	2-10	5–13	5–7	8–4	8–4	10–8	7–11	—	11–7	5–7	6–6	8–10
Pittsburgh	6–6	5–13	3–9	6–6	4–8	8–9	8–10	7–11	—	4–8	3–9	3–15
San Diego	11–7	4–8	9–9	6–12	10–8	7–5	5–7	7–5	8–4	—	12–6	4–8
San Francisco	8–10	6–6	6–12	3–15	7–11	5–7	4–8	6–6	9–3	6–12	—	2–10
St. Louis	9–3	14–4	7–5	6–6	5–7	7–11	10–8	10–8	15–3	8–4	10–2	—

=== Notable transactions ===
- April 3, 1985: Kiko Garcia was released by the Phillies.
- April 5, 1985: Kiko Garcia was signed as a free agent by the Phillies.
- April 20, 1985: Al Holland and Frankie Griffin (minors) were traded by the Phillies to the Pittsburgh Pirates for Kent Tekulve.
- May 17, 1985: Kiko Garcia was released by the Phillies.
- June 3, 1985: 1985 Major League Baseball draft
  - The Phillies drafted catcher Trey McCall with the 16th overall pick in the 1985 Draft.
  - Bruce Ruffin was drafted by the Phillies in the 2nd round. Player signed June 12, 1985.
  - Wally Ritchie was drafted by the Phillies in the 4th round.
- August 8, 1985: Bo Díaz and Greg Simpson (minors) were traded by the Phillies to the Cincinnati Reds for Alan Knicely, Tom Foley and a player to be named later. The Reds completed the deal by sending Freddie Toliver to the Phillies on August 27.
- August 24, 1985: Scott Service was signed by the Philadelphia Phillies as an amateur free agent.
- September 13, 1985: Rick Surhoff was traded by the Phillies to the Texas Rangers for Dave Stewart.

=== Game log ===
Legend
	Phillies win
	Phillies loss
	Postponement
**Bold**	Phillies team member

1985 Game Log
Overall Record: 75–87
April (8–11)

#	Date	Opponent	Score	Win	Loss	Save	Attendance	Record
1	April 9	Braves	0–6	Rick Mahler (1–0)	**Steve Carlton** (0–1)	None	35,361	0–1
2	April 11	Braves	3–6	Zane Smith (1–0)	**John Denny** (0–1)	Bruce Sutter (1)	17,987	0–2
3	April 12	@ Astros	3–8	Dave Smith (1–0)	**Larry Andersen** (0–1)	Jeff Calhoun (1)	11,879	0–3
4	April 13	@ Astros	4–2	**Shane Rawley** (1–0)	Ron Mathis (0–1)	**Al Holland** (1)	19,772	1–3
5	April 14	@ Astros	3–5	Nolan Ryan (2–0)	**Steve Carlton** (0–2)	None	15,277	1–4
6	April 15	@ Cubs	1–2	Steve Trout (2–0)	**Kevin Gross** (0–1)	Lee Smith (2)	8,347	1–5
7	April 16	@ Cubs	0–1 (10)	Dennis Eckersley (1–1)	**Al Holland** (0–1)	None	11,937	1–6
8	April 17	@ Cubs	4–5	George Frazier (1–0)	**Kevin Gross** (0–2)	Lee Smith (3)	15,752	1–7
9	April 19	Mets	0–1	Dwight Gooden (2–0)	**Charles Hudson** (0–1)	Jesse Orosco (1)	32,420	1–8
10	April 20	Mets	7–6	**John Denny** (1–1)	Ed Lynch (0–1)	**Larry Andersen** (1)	24,013	2–8
11	April 21	Mets	10–6	**Kevin Gross** (1–2)	Doug Sisk (1–1)	None	30,186	3–8
12	April 22	@ Expos	9–1	**Shane Rawley** (2–0)	Joe Hesketh (1–1)	None	6,249	4–8
13	April 23	@ Expos	4–5 (10)	Jeff Reardon (1–0)	**Charles Hudson** (0–2)	None	8,223	4–9
14	April 24	@ Expos	6–7	Bryn Smith (3–0)	**John Denny** (1–2)	Tim Burke (1)	10,417	4–10
15	April 26	Cubs	3–7	Dennis Eckersley (3–1)	**Jerry Koosman** (0–1)	None	27,187	4–11
16	April 27	Cubs	6–1	**Shane Rawley** (3–0)	Scott Sanderson (1–1)	None	25,220	5–11
17	April 28	Cubs	3–2	**Kevin Gross** (2–2)	Rick Sutcliffe (3–2)	**Larry Andersen** (2)	31,890	6–11
18	April 29	Expos	3–2 (10)	**Kent Tekulve** (1–0)	Bert Roberge (0–1)	None	19,124	7–11
19	April 30	Expos	11–0	**Jerry Koosman** (1–1)	Bill Gullickson (3–2)	None	18,104	8–11

May (9–17)

#	Date	Opponent	Score	Win	Loss	Save	Attendance	Record
20	May 1	Expos	2–3	David Palmer (2–2)	**Shane Rawley** (3–1)	Jeff Reardon (6)	17,464	8–12
21	May 3	Astros	3–2	**Kent Tekulve** (2–0)	Frank DiPino (1–3)	None	17,330	9–12
22	May 4	Astros	7–5 (13)	**Dave Rucker** (1–0)	Bill Dawley (0–2)	None	25,521	10–12
23	May 5	Astros	3–4	Joe Niekro (2–3)	**Shane Rawley** (3–2)	Frank DiPino (4)	27,506	10–13
24	May 7	Reds	0–2	Mario Soto (5–2)	**Kevin Gross** (2–3)	Ted Power (4)	21,902	10–14
25	May 8	Reds	2–8	Jay Tibbs (2–4)	**John Denny** (1–3)	None	22,416	10–15
26	May 10	@ Mets	0–5	Dwight Gooden (5–1)	**Steve Carlton** (0–3)	None	46,143	10–16
27	May 11	@ Mets	0–4	Sid Fernandez (1–0)	**Shane Rawley** (3–3)	Roger McDowell (1)	29,635	10–17
28	May 12	@ Mets	2–3	Ron Darling (3–1)	**Kevin Gross** (2–4)	Jesse Orosco (4)	32,597	10–18
29	May 13	@ Reds	3–7	John Stuper (4–2)	**John Denny** (1–4)	None	12,068	10–19
30	May 14	@ Reds	7–1	**Charles Hudson** (1–2)	Tom Browning (3–2)	None	10,079	11–19
31	May 15	@ Braves	2–3 (10)	Bruce Sutter (2–0)	**Kent Tekulve** (2–1)	None	10,292	11–20
32	May 16	@ Braves	3–6	Jeff Dedmon (1–0)	**Larry Andersen** (0–2)	Bruce Sutter (6)	10,116	11–21
33	May 17	Dodgers	10–5	**Kevin Gross** (3–4)	Jerry Reuss (2–4)	None	16,334	12–21
34	May 18	Dodgers	7–5	**Larry Andersen** (1–2)	Tom Niedenfuer (1–2)	**Don Carman** (1)	24,189	13–21
35	May 19	Dodgers	2–3	Fernando Valenzuela (4–4)	**Charles Hudson** (1–3)	Ken Howell (5)	35,276	13–22
36	May 20	Giants	2–1	**Steve Carlton** (1–3)	Vida Blue (2–1)	**Kent Tekulve** (1)	20,634	14–22
37	May 21	Giants	6–5	**Shane Rawley** (4–3)	Atlee Hammaker (0–4)	**Kent Tekulve** (2)	18,583	15–22
38	May 22	Giants	2–6	Dave LaPoint (2–5)	**Kevin Gross** (3–5)	Scott Garrelts (4)	18,804	15–23
39	May 24	Padres	0–1	Dave Dravecky (4–2)	**John Denny** (1–5)	Rich Gossage (12)	20,262	15–24
40	May 25	Padres	1–4	Andy Hawkins (9–0)	**Charles Hudson** (1–4)	None	20,539	15–25
41	May 26	Padres	2–7	LaMarr Hoyt (4–4)	**Steve Carlton** (1–4)	Rich Gossage (13)	40,182	15–26
42	May 27	Padres	10–9	**Kent Tekulve** (3–1)	Craig Lefferts (1–1)	None	27,283	16–26
43	May 29	@ Dodgers	1–6	Orel Hershiser (5–0)	**Kevin Gross** (3–6)	None	36,422	16–27
44	May 30	@ Dodgers	6–1	**John Denny** (2–5)	Fernando Valenzuela (5–5)	None	29,591	17–27
45	May 31	@ Giants	3–4	Mike Krukow (4–3)	**Charles Hudson** (1–5)	Mark Davis (1)	7,755	17–28

June (15–12)

#	Date	Opponent	Score	Win	Loss	Save	Attendance	Record
46	June 1	@ Giants	1–2	Atlee Hammaker (2–4)	**Steve Carlton** (1–5)	Greg Minton (1)	21,313	17–29
47	June 2	@ Giants	1–3	Vida Blue (3–1)	**Shane Rawley** (4–4)	Mark Davis (2)	13,799	17–30
48	June 3	@ Padres	3–2	**Kevin Gross** (4–6)	Dave Dravecky (4–3)	**Kent Tekulve** (3)	17,740	18–30
49	June 4	@ Padres	5–6	Craig Lefferts (2–2)	**Kent Tekulve** (3–2)	None	25,141	18–31
50	June 5	@ Padres	1–3	LaMarr Hoyt (6–4)	**Charles Hudson** (1–6)	None	30,352	18–32
51	June 7	Expos	1–3	David Palmer (4–5)	**Steve Carlton** (1–6)	Jeff Reardon (16)	21,039	18–33
52	June 8	Expos	3–4	Bryn Smith (6–2)	**Shane Rawley** (4–5)	Jeff Reardon (17)	22,486	18–34
53	June 9	Expos	4–1	**Kevin Gross** (5–6)	Joe Hesketh (5–3)	**Kent Tekulve** (4)	22,628	19–34
54	June 10	Mets	6–4	**John Denny** (3–5)	Sid Fernandez (1–3)	None	22,183	20–34
55	June 11	Mets	26–7	**Charles Hudson** (2–6)	Tom Gorman (3–3)	None	22,591	21–34
56	June 12	Mets	3–7 (11)	Rick Aguilera (1–0)	**Dave Rucker** (1–1)	None	22,455	21–35
57	June 13	Mets	5–4	**Shane Rawley** (5–5)	Jesse Orosco (1–3)	None	23,381	22–35
58	June 14	@ Pirates	2–3	José DeLeón (2–8)	**Don Carman** (0–1)	Don Robinson (1)	10,211	22–36
59	June 15	@ Pirates	13–3	**John Denny** (4–5)	Rick Rhoden (4–7)	None	10,897	23–36
60	June 16	@ Pirates	3–2	**Charles Hudson** (3–6)	Rick Reuschel (3–1)	**Kent Tekulve** (5)	14,451	24–36
61	June 18	@ Cardinals	2–6	John Tudor (5–7)	**Steve Carlton** (1–7)	None	34,089	24–37
62	June 19	@ Cardinals	1–0	**Jerry Koosman** (2–1)	Joaquín Andújar (12–2)	**Don Carman** (2)	32,146	25–37
63	June 20	@ Cardinals	0–5	Danny Cox (9–2)	**Kevin Gross** (5–7)	None	32,397	25–38
64	June 21	Pirates	4–3 (16)	**Larry Andersen** (2–2)	Jim Winn (2–2)	None	22,493	26–38
65	June 22	Pirates	5–2	**Don Carman** (1–1)	Don Robinson (2–2)	None	23,623	27–38
66	June 23	Pirates	3–2	**Don Carman** (2–1)	Jim Winn (2–3)	None	29,082	28–38
–	June 24	Cardinals	Postponed (rain); Makeup: August 10 as a traditional double-header					
67	June 25	Cardinals	3–1	**Jerry Koosman** (3–1)	Joaquín Andújar (12–3)	None	24,432	29–38
68	June 25	Cardinals	6–4	**John Denny** (5–5)	Danny Cox (9–3)	**Kent Tekulve** (6)	22,213	30–38
69	June 27	Cardinals	3–4	Kurt Kepshire (5–5)	**Shane Rawley** (5–6)	Jeff Lahti (6)	22,691	30–39
70	June 28	@ Expos	3–5	Bryn Smith (9–3)	**Charles Hudson** (3–7)	Tim Burke (2)	15,031	30–40
71	June 29	@ Expos	6–2	**Kevin Gross** (6–7)	Mickey Mahler (1–2)	None	22,813	31–40
72	June 30	@ Expos	3–2	**Kent Tekulve** (4–2)	Jeff Reardon (2–3)	None	35,085	32–40

July (13–14)

#	Date	Opponent	Score	Win	Loss	Save	Attendance	Record
73	July 1	Cubs	1–3	Ray Fontenot (3–3)	**John Denny** (5–6)	Lee Smith (17)	23,091	32–41
74	July 2	Cubs	11–2	**Shane Rawley** (6–6)	Rick Sutcliffe (7–7)	None	23,005	33–41
75	July 3	Cubs	3–4	Lee Smith (4–2)	**Kent Tekulve** (4–3)	None	56,092	33–42
76	July 4	Reds	3–1	**Kevin Gross** (7–7)	Mario Soto (8–8)	None	21,291	34–42
77	July 5	Reds	5–2	**Larry Andersen** (3–2)	Tom Browning (7–6)	**Don Carman** (3)	25,001	35–42
78	July 6	Reds	2–4	Ron Robinson (4–0)	**John Denny** (5–7)	Ted Power (14)	25,161	35–43
79	July 7	Reds	2–3 (10)	John Franco (5–1)	**Kent Tekulve** (4–4)	Ted Power (15)	32,014	35–44
80	July 8	@ Astros	7–4	**Charles Hudson** (4–7)	Mark Knudson (0–1)	**Kent Tekulve** (7)	8,484	36–44
81	July 9	@ Astros	5–3	**Kevin Gross** (8–7)	Bob Knepper (8–5)	**Kent Tekulve** (8)	9,606	37–44
82	July 10	@ Astros	0–10	Mike Scott (8–4)	**Jerry Koosman** (3–2)	None	9,222	37–45
83	July 11	@ Braves	2–3	Bruce Sutter (5–4)	**Larry Andersen** (3–3)	None	10,316	37–46
84	July 12	@ Braves	4–7	Terry Forster (1–2)	**Don Carman** (2–2)	None	23,345	37–47
85	July 13	@ Braves	5–13	Rick Mahler (13–7)	**Charles Hudson** (4–8)	None	31,257	37–48
86	July 14	@ Braves	3–12	Pascual Pérez (1–7)	**Kevin Gross** (8–8)	Rick Camp (1)	17,313	37–49
–	July 16	**1985 Major League Baseball All-Star Game at the Hubert H. Humphrey Metrodome in Minneapolis**						
87	July 18	@ Reds	6–3	**Jerry Koosman** (4–2)	Mario Soto (8–11)	**Kent Tekulve** (9)	25,447	38–49
88	July 19	@ Reds	2–3	John Franco (7–1)	**Kent Tekulve** (4–5)	None	28,929	38–50
89	July 20	@ Reds	10–6	**Shane Rawley** (7–6)	Ron Robinson (5–1)	**Kent Tekulve** (10)	33,624	39–50
90	July 21	@ Reds	6–7	John Franco (8–1)	**Don Carman** (2–3)	Ted Power (17)	30,327	39–51
91	July 22	Astros	7–6	**Don Carman** (3–3)	Jeff Heathcock (0–1)	None	20,450	40–51
92	July 23	Astros	12–6	**Jerry Koosman** (5–2)	Bob Knepper (8–8)	None	21,074	41–51
93	July 24	Astros	3–1	**Kevin Gross** (9–8)	Nolan Ryan (8–8)	**Kent Tekulve** (11)	23,160	42–51
94	July 25	Braves	2–3	Bruce Sutter (6–4)	**Kent Tekulve** (4–6)	None	18,318	42–52
95	July 26	Braves	4–6	Rick Mahler (15–8)	**John Denny** (5–8)	Bruce Sutter (17)	22,212	42–53
96	July 27	Braves	5–4	**Charles Hudson** (5–8)	Zane Smith (6–7)	None	23,027	43–53
97	July 28	Braves	7–3	**Jerry Koosman** (6–2)	Steve Bedrosian (5–10)	None	30,160	44–53
98	July 30	@ Pirates	2–0	**Kevin Gross** (10–8)	Rick Rhoden (5–12)	**Kent Tekulve** (12)	7,496	45–53
99	July 31	@ Pirates	3–4 (10)	Cecilio Guante (3–3)	**Kent Tekulve** (4–7)	None	6,797	45–54

August (16–12)

#	Date	Opponent	Score	Win	Loss	Save	Attendance	Record
100	August 1	@ Pirates	3–0	**John Denny** (6–8)	Don Robinson (2–6)	None	6,199	46–54
101	August 2	@ Cardinals	2–3	John Tudor (13–8)	**Charles Hudson** (5–9)	None	47,805	46–55
102	August 3	@ Cardinals	6–4 (10)	**Don Carman** (4–3)	Jeff Lahti (1–1)	**Larry Andersen** (3)	47,051	47–55
103	August 4	@ Cardinals	6–0	**Kevin Gross** (11–8)	Joaquín Andújar (17–6)	None	46,674	48–55
104	August 5	@ Cardinals	9–1	**Shane Rawley** (8–6)	Danny Cox (12–7)	None	36,689	49–55
–	August 6	Pirates	Postponed (rain); Makeup: October 5 as a traditional double-header					
–	August 7	Pirates	Postponed (rain); Makeup: October 4 as a traditional double-header					
105	August 8	Pirates	7–3	**John Denny** (7–8)	Don Robinson (2–7)	**Don Carman** (4)	18,142	50–55
106	August 9	Cardinals	4–5	Joaquín Andújar (18–6)	**Charles Hudson** (5–10)	Jeff Lahti (13)	25,194	50–56
107	August 10 (1)	Cardinals	4–5	Danny Cox (13–7)	**Jerry Koosman** (6–3)	Jeff Lahti (14)	see 2nd game	50–57
108	August 10 (2)	Cardinals	4–13	Ricky Horton (1–2)	**Kevin Gross** (11–9)	None	37,321	50–58
109	August 11	Cardinals	4–1	**Shane Rawley** (9–6)	Bob Forsch (4–5)	None	31,602	51–58
110	August 12	@ Mets	3–4	Sid Fernandez (4–6)	**John Denny** (7–9)	Jesse Orosco (12)	26,577	51–59
111	August 13	@ Mets	2–4	Rick Aguilera (6–3)	**Charles Hudson** (5–11)	Jesse Orosco (13)	31,186	51–60
112	August 14	@ Mets	2–1	**Kevin Gross** (12–9)	Ron Darling (10–5)	**Don Carman** (5)	31,549	52–60
113	August 15	@ Mets	7–10	Jesse Orosco (4–4)	**Don Carman** (4–4)	None	36,663	52–61
114	August 16	@ Cubs	5–6	Lee Smith (6–4)	**Kent Tekulve** (4–8)	None	31,557	52–62
115	August 17	@ Cubs	10–4	**John Denny** (8–9)	Lary Sorensen (3–4)	None	31,421	53–62
116	August 18	@ Cubs	9–5	**Charles Hudson** (6–11)	Jay Baller (0–1)	**Kent Tekulve** (13)	31,269	54–62
117	August 20	Dodgers	4–5 (11)	Tom Niedenfuer (6–4)	**Kent Tekulve** (4–9)	Rick Honeycutt (1)	24,227	54–63
118	August 21	Dodgers	6–15	Fernando Valenzuela (15–8)	**Jerry Koosman** (6–4)	None	23,650	54–64
119	August 22	Dodgers	2–0	**Shane Rawley** (10–6)	Jerry Reuss (11–8)	None	22,598	55–64
120	August 23	Giants	1–4	Atlee Hammaker (4–10)	**John Denny** (8–10)	Scott Garrelts (11)	26,194	55–65
121	August 24	Giants	9–2	**Charles Hudson** (7–11)	Mike Krukow (8–9)	None	27,011	56–65
122	August 25	Giants	14–5	**Dave Rucker** (2–1)	Jim Gott (4–10)	None	25,653	57–65
123	August 26	Padres	4–3	**Don Carman** (5–4)	Lance McCullers (0–1)	None	25,736	58–65
124	August 27	Padres	1–4	Mark Thurmond (6–7)	**John Denny** (8–11)	Roy Lee Jackson (2)	23,604	58–66
125	August 29	@ Dodgers	3–2 (10)	**Don Carman** (6–4)	Rick Honeycutt (7–12)	None	39,487	59–66
126	August 30	@ Dodgers	5–2	**Kevin Gross** (13–9)	Bob Welch (9–3)	**Dave Shipanoff** (1)	49,068	60–66
127	August 31	@ Dodgers	5–0	**Shane Rawley** (11–6)	Fernando Valenzuela (16–9)	None	46,942	61–66

September (10–17)

#	Date	Opponent	Score	Win	Loss	Save	Attendance	Record
128	September 1	@ Dodgers	4–1	**John Denny** (9–11)	Jerry Reuss (12–9)	**Dave Shipanoff** (2)	29,029	62–66
129	September 2	@ Giants	4–3 (10)	**Don Carman** (7–4)	Mike Jeffcoat (0–2)	**Dave Shipanoff** (3)	6,522	63–66
130	September 3	@ Giants	4–3 (13)	**Dave Shipanoff** (1–0)	Greg Minton (3–4)	**Freddie Toliver** (1)	1,632	64–66
131	September 4	@ Giants	3–4	Mark Davis (5–8)	**Freddie Toliver** (0–1)	None	2,067	64–67
132	September 6	@ Padres	2–3 (11)	Rich Gossage (3–2)	**Dave Shipanoff** (1–1)	None	14,889	64–68
133	September 7	@ Padres	2–0	**John Denny** (10–11)	Andy Hawkins (17–5)	None	11,141	65–68
134	September 8	@ Padres	9–7	**Rich Surhoff** (1–0)	Ed Wojna (1–3)	**Dave Rucker** (1)	15,765	66–68
135	September 10	Expos	5–2 (11)	**Don Carman** (8–4)	Tim Burke (8–3)	None	15,920	67–68
136	September 11	Expos	4–1	**Kevin Gross** (14–9)	Bill Gullickson (13–11)	None	15,193	68–68
137	September 12	Expos	3–6	Floyd Youmans (3–2)	**Shane Rawley** (11–7)	Jeff Reardon (34)	15,335	68–69
138	September 13	@ Pirates	6–3	**John Denny** (11–11)	Bob Walk (1–3)	**Kent Tekulve** (14)	4,429	69–69
139	September 14	@ Pirates	3–6	Lee Tunnell (4–9)	**Steve Carlton** (1–8)	Cecilio Guante (4)	5,549	69–70
140	September 15	@ Pirates	4–5	Rick Reuschel (13–7)	**Dave Shipanoff** (1–2)	None	5,961	69–71
141	September 16	@ Mets	0–9	Dwight Gooden (21–4)	**Kevin Gross** (14–10)	None	30,606	69–72
142	September 17	@ Mets	5–1	**Shane Rawley** (12–7)	Ed Lynch (10–8)	None	22,440	70–72
143	September 18	Cardinals	0–7	Bob Forsch (8–6)	**John Denny** (11–12)	None	17,354	70–73
144	September 19	Cardinals	6–3	**Dave Rucker** (3–1)	Matt Keough (0–1)	**Don Carman** (6)	17,120	71–73
145	September 20	Cubs	1–3	Reggie Patterson (1–0)	**Charles Hudson** (7–12)	Lee Smith (30)	20,207	71–74
146	September 21	Cubs	2–9	Johnny Abrego (1–0)	**Kevin Gross** (14–11)	None	17,779	71–75
147	September 22	Cubs	2–9	Dennis Eckersley (10–6)	**Shane Rawley** (12–8)	None	21,768	71–76
148	September 23	Mets	1–4	Rick Aguilera (9–6)	**Freddie Toliver** (0–2)	Roger McDowell (16)	15,295	71–77
149	September 24	Mets	1–7	Sid Fernandez (8–9)	**Dave Rucker** (3–2)	None	14,398	71–78
150	September 25	@ Cardinals	3–6	Danny Cox (17–9)	**Charles Hudson** (7–13)	Jeff Lahti (18)	17,733	71–79
151	September 26	@ Cardinals	0–5	John Tudor (20–8)	**Kevin Gross** (14–12)	None	23,598	71–80
152	September 27	@ Cubs	7–9	Jay Baller (2–3)	**Kent Tekulve** (4–10)	Lee Smith (31)	9,258	71–81
153	September 28	@ Cubs	10–11	Dennis Eckersley (11–6)	**John Denny** (11–13)	Lee Smith (32)	27,875	71–82
154	September 29	@ Cubs	2–6	Steve Trout (9–6)	**Freddie Toliver** (0–3)	None	26,641	71–83

October (4–4)

#	Date	Opponent	Score	Win	Loss	Save	Attendance	Record
–	October 1	@ Expos	Postponed (rain); Makeup: October 2 as a traditional double-header					
155	October 2 (1)	@ Expos	1–3	Bryn Smith (18–5)	**Kevin Gross** (14–13)	Jeff Reardon (39)	see 2nd game	71–84
156	October 2 (2)	@ Expos	3–2	**Charles Hudson** (8–13)	David Palmer (7–10)	None	10,178	72–84
157	October 3	@ Expos	8–7	**Shane Rawley** (13–8)	Bill Laskey (5–16)	**Don Carman** (7)	7,772	73–84
158	October 4 (1)	Pirates	2–7	Bob Walk (2–3)	**John Denny** (11–14)	José DeLeón (3)	see 2nd game	73–85
159	October 4 (2)	Pirates	8–5	**Don Carman** (9–4)	José DeLeón (2–19)	None	12,410	74–85
160	October 5 (1)	Pirates	2–4	Larry McWilliams (7–9)	**Freddie Toliver** (0–4)	Rick Reuschel (1)	see 2nd game	74–86
161	October 5 (2)	Pirates	0–5	Mike Bielecki (2–3)	**Rocky Childress** (0–1)	None	21,820	74–87
162	October 6	Pirates	5–0	**Kevin Gross** (15–13)	Rick Rhoden (10–15)	None	13,749	75–87

=== Roster ===
1985 Philadelphia Phillies
**Roster**
**Pitchers**: 47 Larry Andersen; 32 Steve Carlton; 42 Don Carman; 50 Rocky Childress; 40 John Denny; 46 Kevin Gross; 19 Al Holland; 49 Charles Hudson; 24 Jerry Koosman; 48 Shane Rawley; 39 Dave Rucker; 33 Dave Shipanoff; 38 Dave Stewart; 56 Rick Surhoff; 27 Kent Tekulve; 43 Freddie Toliver; 38 Pat Zachry	**Catchers**: 10 Darren Daulton; 6 Bo Díaz; 17 Ozzie Virgil; **Infielders**: 16 Luis Aguayo; 22 Tim Corcoran; 11 Tom Foley; 18 Kiko Garcia; 30 Steve Jeltz; 6 Alan Knicely; 8 Juan Samuel; 20 Mike Schmidt; 15 Rick Schu; 18 Derrel Thomas; 14 John Wockenfuss	**Outfielders**: 21 Greg Gross; 9 Von Hayes; 31 Garry Maddox; 29 John Russell; 26 Jeff Stone; 12 Glenn Wilson	**Manager**: 7 John Felske; **Coaches**: 4 Dave Bristol (Third Base); 2 Lee Elia (Bench); 3 Claude Osteen (Pitching); 5 Mike Ryan (Bullpen); 25 Del Unser (Hitting & First Base)

== Player stats ==
= Indicates team leader

= Indicates league leader

=== Batting ===
==== Starters by position ====
Note: Pos = Position; G = Games played; AB = At bats; H = Hits; Avg. = Batting average; HR = Home runs; RBI = Runs batted in

Pos	Player	G	AB	H	Avg.	HR	RBI
C	Ozzie Virgil	131	426	105	.246	19	55
1B	Mike Schmidt	158	549	152	.277	33	93
2B	Juan Samuel	161	663	175	.264	19	74
SS	Steve Jeltz	89	196	37	.189	0	12
3B	Rick Schu	112	416	105	.252	7	24
LF	Jeff Stone	88	264	70	.265	3	11
CF	Von Hayes	152	570	150	.263	13	70
RF	Glenn Wilson	161	608	167	.275	14	102

==== Other batters ====
Note: G = Games played; AB = At bats; H = Hits; Avg. = Batting average; HR = Home runs; RBI = Runs batted in

Player	G	AB	H	Avg.	HR	RBI
Garry Maddox	105	218	52	.239	4	23
John Russell	81	216	47	.218	9	23
Tim Corcoran	103	182	39	.214	0	22
Greg Gross	93	169	44	.260	0	14
Luis Aguayo	91	165	46	.279	6	21
Tom Foley	46	158	42	.266	3	17
Darren Daulton	36	103	21	.204	4	11
Derrel Thomas	63	92	19	.207	4	12
Bo Díaz	26	76	16	.211	2	16
John Wockenfuss	32	37	6	.162	0	2
Alan Knicely	7	7	0	.000	0	0
Kiko Garcia	4	3	0	.000	0	0

=== Pitching ===
==== Starting pitchers ====
Note: G = Games pitched; IP = Innings pitched; W = Wins; L = Losses; ERA = Earned run average; SO = Strikeouts

Player	G	IP	W	L	ERA	SO
John Denny	33	230.2	11	14	3.82	123
Kevin Gross	38	205.2	15	13	3.41	151
Shane Rawley	36	198.2	13	8	3.31	106
Charles Hudson	38	193.0	8	13	3.78	122
Jerry Koosman	19	99.1	6	4	4.62	60
Steve Carlton	16	92.0	1	8	3.33	48

==== Other pitchers ====
Note: G = Games pitched; IP = Innings pitched; W = Wins; L = Losses; ERA = Earned run average; SO = Strikeouts

Player	G	IP	W	L	ERA	SO
Freddie Toliver	11	25.0	0	4	4.68	23

==== Relief pitchers ====
Note: G = Games pitched; W = Wins; L = Losses; SV = Saves; ERA = Earned run average; SO = Strikeouts

Player	G	W	L	SV	ERA	SO
Kent Tekulve	58	4	10	14	2.99	36
Don Carman	71	9	4	7	2.08	87
Larry Andersen	57	3	3	3	4.32	50
Dave Rucker	39	3	2	1	4.31	41
Dave Shipanoff	26	1	2	3	3.22	26
Rocky Childress	16	0	1	0	6.21	14
Pat Zachry	10	0	0	0	4.26	8
Dave Stewart	4	0	0	0	6.23	2
Al Holland	3	0	1	1	4.50	1
Rick Surhoff	2	1	0	0	0.00	1

== Farm system ==
Level	Team	League	Manager
AAA	Portland Beavers	Pacific Coast League	Bill Dancy
AA	Reading Phillies	Eastern League	Tony Taylor
A	Peninsula Pilots	Carolina League	Ron Clark
A	Clearwater Phillies	Florida State League	Ramón Avilés
A	Spartanburg Suns	South Atlantic League	Roly de Armas
A-Short Season	Bend Phillies	Northwest League	P. J. Carey
