= Dave Shipanoff =

Canadian baseball player (born 1959)

- Pitcher
- Born: November 13, 1959 (age 65); Edmonton, Alberta, Canada
- Batted: Right Threw: Right

MLB debut
- August 10, 1985, for the Philadelphia Phillies

Last MLB appearance
- October 5, 1985, for the Philadelphia Phillies

MLB statistics
- Win–loss record: 1–2
- Earned run average: 3.22
- Strikeouts: 26
- Stats at Baseball Reference

Teams
- Philadelphia Phillies (1985)

David Noel Shipanoff (born November 13, 1959) is a former Major League Baseball relief pitcher who played for the Philadelphia Phillies during the 1985 season.

Shipanoff attended Paul Kane High School in St. Albert, Alberta and played college baseball at Wabash Valley College. In his first season at Wabash Valley, he had a record of 16–0 and threw a no-hitter against Southeastern Illinois College.

The right-hander was signed by the Toronto Blue Jays as an amateur free agent on July 19, 1980. He spent the next five years rising up the ranks of the Blue Jays' farm system. The Philadelphia Phillies acquired him via trade almost five years later (April 1, 1985) along with Ken Kinnard and Jose Escobar when they gave up Len Matuszek, and he pitched for the Phillies during the last two months of that season.

Shipanoff made his major league debut against the St. Louis Cardinals on August 10, 1985, at Veterans Stadium. He entered game 1 of the doubleheader in the top of the 6th with Philadelphia trailing 5–1, and he proceeded to hurl three scoreless innings of relief before being lifted for a pinch hitter. He had allowed three hits, struck out three, and walked no one.

Season and career totals include 26 games pitched, a 1–2 record, 12 games finished, 3 saves, 26 strikeouts and 16 walks in 36.1 innings pitched, and an earned run average of 3.22.

Also in 1985, Shipanoff was the recipient of the Tip O'Neill Award, given out by the Canadian Baseball Hall of Fame to the Canadian baseball player "judged to have excelled in individual achievement and team contribution while adhering to the highest ideals of the game of baseball."
