= Kelvin Chapman =

American baseball player (born 1956)

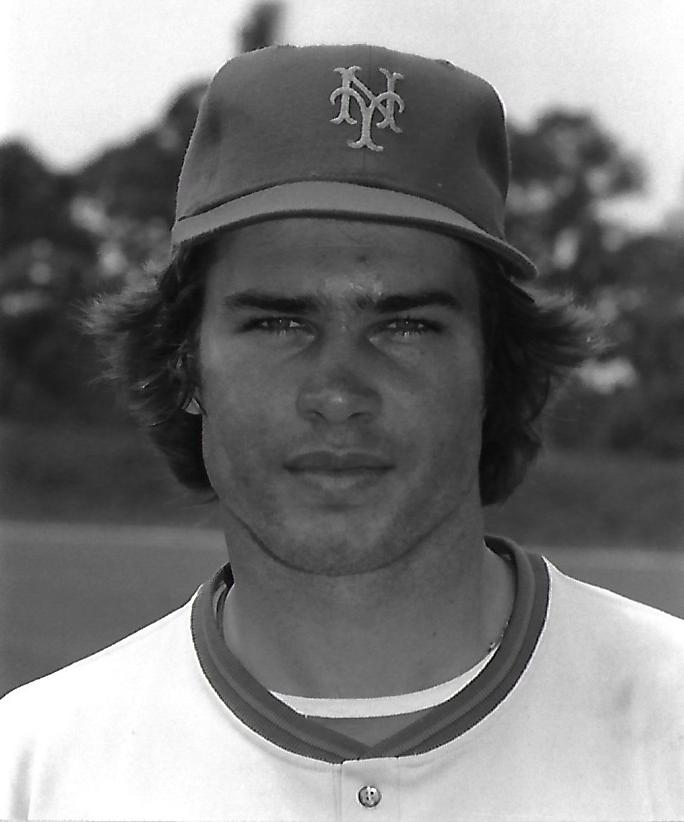
- Second baseman
- Born: June 2, 1956 (age 70); Willits, California, U.S.
- Batted: Right Threw: Right

MLB debut
- April 5, 1979, for the New York Mets

Last MLB appearance
- July 24, 1985, for the New York Mets

MLB statistics
- Batting average: .223
- Home runs: 3
- Runs batted in: 34
- Stats at Baseball Reference

Teams
- New York Mets (1979, 1984–1985)

Kelvin Keith Chapman (born June 2, 1956) is an American former professional baseball second baseman. He played in Major League Baseball (MLB) with the New York Mets.

== Early career ==
Kelvin Chapman attended Santa Rosa Junior College. He was signed by the Mets organization as an amateur free agent on December 3, 1975. His first season as a professional was with the Met's Rookie League team, Marion Mets of the Appalachian League in 1976. That season he played 62 games and had a batting average of .269, a slugging percentage of .347, and an on-base percentage of .342.

The following year he was promoted to the Mets A-league team, the Wausau Mets of the Midwest League. In 127 games his batting average improved to .306, his slugging percentage improved to .456 and his on-base percentage improved to .378.

This performance led to another promotion to the Mets AA-league team, the Jackson Mets of the Texas League for the 1978 season. The team featured several other future New York Mets players, including Mookie Wilson, Neil Allen and Jeff Reardon. Chapman played 131 games for Jackson, 129 of which were at second base. He posted a batting average of .266, a slugging percentage of .383, and an on-base percentage of .347.

== Major League debut ==
Although he had never played AAA baseball, and although his performance at Jackson was not outstanding, Chapman had an excellent spring training in 1979 for the Mets and earned a spot as the Mets starting second baseman to begin the season. He replaced strong fielding but light hitting Doug Flynn, who was the Mets regular second baseman in 1978. Chapman's major league debut occurred on April 5, 1979 against the Chicago Cubs at Wrigley Field. He got 2 hits in 5 at-bats in his debut. However, Chapman only batted .150 for the Mets in 80 at bats that season, relinquishing the starting second base job back to Flynn by late April. He was sent to the minors in May, returning to the Mets only in September after the minor league season ended.

Chapman played for the Mets AAA-league team, the Tidewater Tides of the International League for most of the 1979 season. He played 106 games as second base for the Tides, with a batting average of .241, a slugging percentage of .318 and an on-base percentage of .341.

From 1980 through 1983 Chapman played in AAA without getting back to the Major Leagues. He played with Tidewater in 1980, 1982 and 1983, and with the Syracuse Chiefs in 1981. During that time he played primarily second base, but also played a few games at third base, shortstop and outfield. He batted poorly in 1980 and 1981 but improved in 1982 and 1983. He also played for Tidewater at the beginning of 1984.

== Return to the Major Leagues ==
The Mets regular second baseman in 1984 was Wally Backman, a switch hitter who was much better when batting lefty. The Mets needed a right-handed hitting second baseman to platoon with Backman. After Chapman got off to a strong start with Tidewater in 1984, he was recalled to the Mets in May, more than 4 years after his previous Major League game in 1979. His first game for the Mets in 1984 was on May 6. Chapman played 75 games for the Mets in 1984, finishing with a batting average of .289, a slugging percentage of .401 and an on-base percentage of .356, helping the Mets finish 2nd in the National League East. Chapman also posted a league average fielding percentage in 57 games at second base of .979 that season, also playing 3 games at third base for the Mets.

In 1985, Chapman continued to platoon with Backman as the Mets second basemen. On June 1, 1985, the Mets were playing the San Diego Padres and were down 2-0 when the Mets rallied for three runs in the sixth inning, a rally that was spurred on by Chapman and Ray Knight. Chapman got the rally going by leading off the inning with a single. Not long after Knight singled, George Foster hit a ball that scored both Chapman and Knight. However, Chapman did not hit as well as he did the prior season. With a batting average of just .174, Chapman was sent back to the Tidewater Tides after playing his last Major League game on July 24, 1985. Chapman batted just .185 with Tidewater in 1985 and was released by the Mets after the season on November 13, 1985. The Mets did make an offer to remain in the organization, as perhaps a manager in their farm system, but Chapman, who had injured his knee during the 1985 season, opted to retire and return home to California.
