= Bill Latham (baseball) =

American baseball player (born 1960)

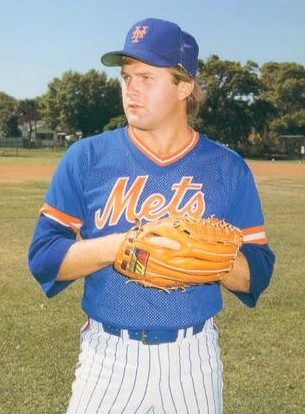
- Pitcher
- Born: August 29, 1960 (age 65); Birmingham, Alabama, U.S.
- Batted: Left Threw: Left

MLB debut
- April 15, 1985, for the New York Mets

Last MLB appearance
- October 1, 1986, for the Minnesota Twins

MLB statistics
- Win–loss record: 1–4
- Earned run average: 5.35
- Strikeouts: 18
- Stats at Baseball Reference

Teams
- New York Mets (1985); Minnesota Twins (1986)

William Carol Latham (born August 29, 1960) is an American former Major League Baseball pitcher. He pitched parts of two seasons in the majors, appearing in 7 games for the New York Mets in 1985 and 7 games for the Minnesota Twins in 1986. In 2011 he joined the scouting staff of the Los Angeles Dodgers after six years as a professional scout for the Boston Red Sox.
