= Rocky Childress =

American baseball player (born 1962)

- Pitcher
- Born: February 18, 1962 (age 64); Santa Rosa, California, U.S.
- Batted: Right Threw: Right

MLB debut
- May 17, 1985, for the Philadelphia Phillies

Last MLB appearance
- October 1, 1988, for the Houston Astros

MLB statistics
- Win–loss record: 2–3
- Earned run average: 4.76
- Strikeouts: 65
- Stats at Baseball Reference

Teams
- Philadelphia Phillies (1985–1986); Houston Astros (1987–1988)

Rodney Osborne "Rocky" Childress (born February 18, 1962) is an American former professional baseball pitcher. He played all or part of four seasons in Major League Baseball (MLB), from 1985 until 1988, for the Philadelphia Phillies and Houston Astros.
