= Terry Leach =

American baseball player (born 1954)

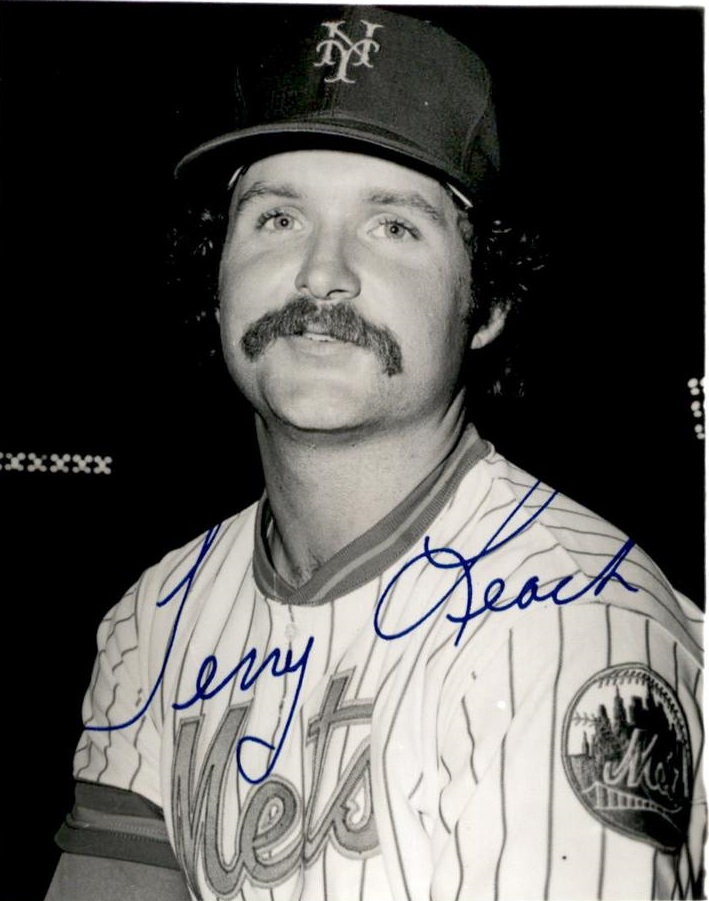
- Pitcher
- Born: March 13, 1954 (age 71); Selma, Alabama, U.S.
- Batted: Right Threw: Right

MLB debut
- August 12, 1981, for the New York Mets

Last MLB appearance
- June 23, 1993, for the Chicago White Sox

MLB statistics
- Win–loss record: 38–27
- Earned run average: 3.15
- Strikeouts: 331
- Stats at Baseball Reference

Teams
- New York Mets (1981–1982, 1985–1989); Kansas City Royals (1989); Minnesota Twins (1990–1991); Chicago White Sox (1992–1993)

Career highlights and awards
- World Series champion (1991)

Terry Hester Leach (born March 13, 1954) is an American former Major League Baseball pitcher, and author of the book, Things Happen for a Reason: The True Story of an Itinerant Life in Baseball.

== Route to the majors ==
Leach played college ball at Auburn University, and was originally drafted by the Boston Red Sox in January 1976, but the pick was voided. He then signed with the unaffiliated Baton Rouge Cougars of the Gulf States League. With the Cougars, he was 2–0 with a 6.16 earned run average in five games. A year later, he signed with the Atlanta Braves as an undrafted free agent.

With the Greenwood Braves, Leach went 3–2 with a far more respectable 2.55 ERA in 1977. Leach went 19–23 as a minor leaguer in the Braves' farm system when he was released by the Braves July 23, 1980. On July 27, he signed as a Free Agent with the New York Mets.

After a season and a half in the minors with the Mets organization, he made his major-league debut at Wrigley Field on August 12, 1981. With the Mets leading 4–2 over the Chicago Cubs, Leach surrendered a two-run home run to Mike Lum, tying the game. The Mets, however, came back to win the game in extra innings, 7–4.

Leach made only one start with the Mets in 1982; it was, however, one of the greatest pitching performances in franchise history. Rick Ownbey was scheduled to start on October 1, the second to last day of the season. A blister on his throwing hand forced Mets manager George Bamberger to start Leach in his place. Leach ended up tossing a ten inning one-hitter against the Philadelphia Phillies; the only hit being a fifth inning triple by Luis Aguayo.

Despite ending the 1982 season on a high note, Leach spent all of 1983 in the minors. At the end of the season, he was dealt to the Chicago Cubs for two minor leaguers. At the start of the 1984 season, he was dealt back to the Atlanta Braves for fellow minor-league journeyman pitcher Ron Meridith. A month later, he was released; the following day, the Mets re-signed him.

== New York Mets ==
Leach split 1985 between the Mets and the Tidewater Tides, and was essentially a minor leaguer again in 1986, making only six appearances with the Mets during their World Championship season. Despite the fact that he spent much of 1986 in the minors, he was given a World Series ring in 1995, nine years after the series.

Leach did not allow a run in Spring training 1987, but was still cut in the final week and sent back to the minors. However, Dwight Gooden's stint in a drug rehabilitation center, coupled with Bob Ojeda's being out for season-ending surgery, opened a spot in the rotation for Leach. Leach responded with an 11–1 record including ten consecutive wins. Pitching exclusively out of the bullpen again a season later, Leach went 7–2 with a 2.54 ERA and three saves. In the 1988 National League Championship Series against the Los Angeles Dodgers, he pitched five innings without giving up a run.

== Kansas City Royals ==
In June 1989, the Mets traded Leach to the Kansas City Royals for Aquedo Vasquez. He went 5–6 with a 4.15 ERA in his only season in Kansas City.

== Minnesota Twins ==
He was released during Spring training in 1990, and caught on with the Minnesota Twins. In 1991, he made his second trip to the post season while with the Twins, and made two appearances in their World Series victory over the Atlanta Braves. In game three, he entered with the bases loaded and two outs, with the Twins trailing by three runs and the Braves having already scored twice in the inning. He struck out Mark Lemke to end the threat. In game five he pitched two innings, allowing one run. He would make a total of 105 regular season appearances in his two years with the Twins, posting ERAs of 3.20 and 3.61.

== Chicago White Sox ==
Leach became a free agent after the Series, and signed with the Montreal Expos. The Expos released him during Spring training, and he signed with the Chicago White Sox. In 1992, Leach was 6–5 with a 1.95 ERA for the ChiSox. He split 1993 between the White Sox, their double-A affiliate and their triple-A affiliate. He was released during spring training in 1994 and after a year away from the game he retired for good after a failed attempt to make the Detroit Tigers in 1995.

== Author ==
In 2000, Leach wrote his autobiography, Things Happen for a Reason: The True Story of an Itinerant Life in Baseball with Tom Clark.
