= John Denny =

American baseball player (born 1952)

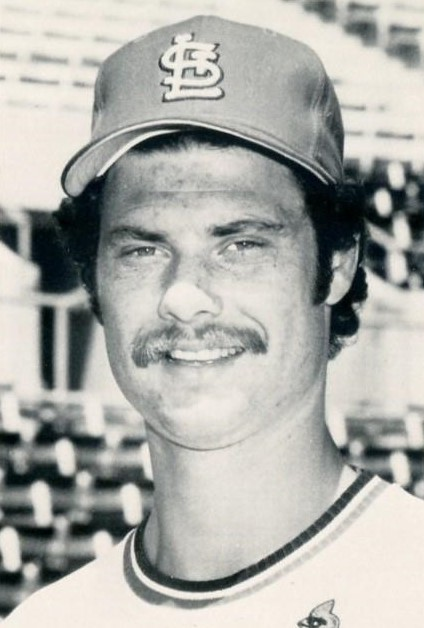
- Pitcher
- Born: November 8, 1952 (age 73); Prescott, Arizona, U.S.
- Batted: Right Threw: Right

MLB debut
- September 12, 1974, for the St. Louis Cardinals

Last MLB appearance
- August 18, 1986, for the Cincinnati Reds

MLB statistics
- Win–loss record: 123–108
- Earned run average: 3.59
- Strikeouts: 1,146
- Stats at Baseball Reference

Teams
- St. Louis Cardinals (1974–1979); Cleveland Indians (1980–1982); Philadelphia Phillies (1982–1985); Cincinnati Reds (1986)

Career highlights and awards
- NL Cy Young Award (1983); NL wins leader (1983); NL ERA leader (1976)

John Allen Denny (born November 8, 1952) is an American former professional baseball right-handed pitcher who played in Major League Baseball (MLB) for the St. Louis Cardinals, Cleveland Indians, Philadelphia Phillies, and Cincinnati Reds, from 1974 to 1986. Denny won the National League (NL) Cy Young Award, in 1983.

== Early life ==
Denny was born on November 8, 1952, in Prescott, Arizona. His father abandoned the family when Denny was five, which led to a bitterness in Denny for many years. He attended Prescott High School, where he excelled in football and basketball, as well as baseball. He also attended Yavapai Junior College (now Yavapai College) in Prescott, where one report states he pitched on its baseball team; though it is also reported he only took classes at Yavapai. He played both quarterback and on defense for Prescott's football team.

== Career ==
=== St. Louis Cardinals ===
==== Minor leagues ====
In the 1970 amateur draft, he was selected by the Cardinals in the 29th round. He made his professional debut that year at the age of 17, with the Cardinals Gulf Coast League rookie team. In 1971, he was assigned to the Single-A St. Petersburg Cardinals of the Florida State League, where he had an 8–13 win–loss record, but a 3.04 earned run average (ERA) in 23 starting appearances. In 1972, he played for the Modesto Reds of the California League, where he was 7–5 with a 4.40 ERA, but suffered with arm and shoulder problems that put him out mid-season.

In 1973, Denny was promoted to the Double-A Arkansas Travelers of the Texas League, going 10–6, with a 3.12 ERA in 20 starts. In late May 1973, he pitched a no-hitter for the Travelers. Denny pitched for the Triple-A Tulsa Oilers in 1974 and went 9–8 with a 3.75 ERA. After the 1974 season, the Cardinals concluded that Denny had better command of his fastball, curveball, slider and change up than any of their other Major League or minor league pitchers.

Denny began the 1975 season with the Cardinals, but was assigned back to Tulsa for a month early in the season. While with Tulsa, he was 3–1 with a 1.80 ERA in seven starting appearances, before returning to the Cardinals.

==== Cardinals ====
Denny made his major league debut on September 12, 1974. He faced two batters, giving up one base hit, with the other batter reaching base on an error. He only pitched in one other game for the Cardinals that season.

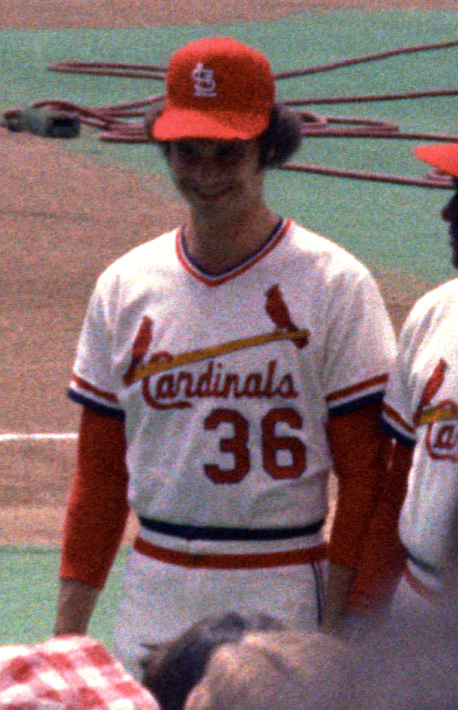
Denny in 1974

Denny began the 1975 season with the Cardinals, and after being assigned to Tulsa for a month, returned to finish the season with the Cardinals. Denny started seven games for the Cardinals from April 10 to May 12. In his first three games, Denny was 2–1 with a 1.40 ERA in 19.1 innings pitched. Over his next four starts from April 26 to May 12, he was 0–1 in only 7.2 innings pitched during those four games (not getting out of the first inning in two of those games). His ERA rose to 4.33 before being sent to Tulsa.

After returning from Tulsa in late June 1975, he started 14 of the 18 games in which he appeared, from June 23 to September 23. He went 8–5 over that two-month period. After defeating the Atlanta Braves on August 23, he had a 9–3 record and had lowered his ERA to 3.49. However, he tore a ligament and kept pitching through it to help the Cardinals in their pennant race efforts, going 1–4 in his last five games, and finishing with a 3.97 ERA. The St. Louis chapter of the Baseball Writers of America named him the team's rookie of the year.

In 1976, Denny was healthy and had a breakout season. He led the National League in ERA at 2.52, and was the only starter on the team with an over .500 winning percentage. Due to poor run support, his record was just 11–9. The Cardinals scored two or fewer runs in 10 of the 30 games in which Denny started that season. In between innings of a close game that season, Denny and his future Hall of Fame catcher Ted Simmons got into an argument over why Denny attempted to make a play in the field that Simmons had told him not to attempt. They were soon in a fistfight, but then returned to the field together to play the next inning.

In 1977, he was 8–8. He began the season with a 5–0 record (best in the National League) and 2.91 ERA. He was pitching a 4-hitter, having allowed only one run into the seventh inning of a May 2 game against the Cincinnati Reds, when he suffered a hamstring strain that ultimately derailed his season; later suffering a torn hamstring against the Dodgers. He came back from the original strain on May 15, but his ERA went from 2.68 to 4.51 over the remainder of the season, with a 3–8 record (recording eight consecutive losses at one point). Denny was healthy in 1978, and improved his record to 14–11, with a 2.96 ERA. He fell to 8–11 with a 4.85 ERA in 1979, and was traded with Jerry Mumphrey from the Cardinals to the Cleveland Indians for Bobby Bonds on December 7, 1979.

During his years with the Cardinals, Hall of Fame teammate Lou Brock had taken Denny under his wing, to teach him the proper way to approach playing baseball.

=== Cleveland Indians ===
He was 24-23 in three seasons with Cleveland. He suffered a heel injury in 1980 and a back injury in 1981. There was also a 50 day players strike in 1981. He had his best year with them in 1981, when he was 10–6, with a 3.15 ERA. In the final eight weeks of the 1981 season, Denny was 7–2, with a 2.31 ERA. Between August 28 and September 6 he pitched three straight shutouts.

Denny was a free agent after that season, and chose to sign with Cleveland rather than the New York Yankees; receiving a three-year contract for $1.5 million. It has also been stated the contract was for $2 million, or a little less than $2 million. Denny loved the idea of playing for the Yankees, but did not believe he could play for Yankees' owner George Steinbrenner, who had a reputation of overinvolvement with the team.

On August 23, 1981, he was involved in a brawl between the California Angels and Cleveland when he hit Dan Ford in the buttocks with a pitch in the third inning. After being hit, Ford yelled at Denny and was restrained by umpire Mike Reilly. Angels future Hall of Famer Rod Carew came out of the dugout and rushed the mound. Cleveland believed Carew triggered the ensuing brawl, rather than Denny's pitch (though the Angels believed Denny hit Ford because of Ford's superb batting during the series between the teams). Denny wound up on the ground being punched by Angels' players during a 25-minute brawl that involved a number of different fights. Only the Angels' Don Baylor was ejected, and Denny went on to pitch seven innings, in a 6–3 Cleveland win.

==== Reggie Jackson incident ====
Denny was involved in another on-field altercation in late September 1981, this time with future Hall of Fame New York Yankees' outfielder Reggie Jackson. Early in a September 23 game, Denny threw a high and tight fastball toward Jackson, causing Jackson to hit the ground. Cleveland manager Dave Garcia did not believe the pitch was actually close to hitting Jackson. Jackson struck out in that at bat, and took a few steps toward the mound yelling at Denny as Denny left the field. In his next at bat, Jackson hit a home run against Denny. He stood at home plate for an extra moment to watch the home run before beginning to round the bases. As he was coming into home plate he tipped his helmet to the Yankees fans. After Jackson crossed home plate, there was an interchange with Denny and he charged Denny who was half-way to home plate. A fight ensued between them, which led to a 15-minute bench clearing brawl. Denny and Jackson were ejected from the game.

In 1982, Denny missed 33 consecutive days and eight starts with Cleveland because of arm problems. On September 12, 1982, he was 6–11 with a 5.01 ERA with Cleveland, when he was traded to the Philadelphia Phillies for Wil Culmer, Jerry Reed and Roy Smith.

=== Philadelphia Phillies ===
At the time Denny was traded to the Phillies, they were only ½ game out of first place in the National League's East Division. Despite his difficulties in Cleveland, Denny had pitched well in his last two starts before the trade, and Phillies general manager Paul Owens saw Denny as a viable replacement for the struggling Marty Bystrom during the Phillies' pennant drive. Phillies scout Hugh Alexander gave Owens a positive review of Denny's arm. Denny started four games for the Phillies in 1982, pitching 22.1 innings, with an 0–2 record and 4.03 ERA. The Phillies finished three games behind the Cardinals in the East Division.

In 1983, Denny enjoyed the best season of his career, going 19–6 with a 2.37 ERA, and winning the National League's Cy Young Award. He topped the NL in wins and winning percentage and was second in ERA. He also led the Phillies to the NL East Division championship, with a 6–0 record during their September pennant drive. The Phillies were 27–9 in games Denny started, and scored only seven runs (including two shutouts) in the games he lost. He was third in all of Major League Baseball with a 7.5 WAR (wins above replacement), behind only Hall of Famers Cal Ripken Jr. and Wade Boggs. In that year's NL Cy Young Award voting, he received 20 of 24 first-place votes to win going away.

After having a long history of injuries and going on the disabled list in St. Louis and Cleveland, he had a healthy season in 1983. He attributed his success in considerable part to following the workout program of his teammate Steve Carlton, a future Hall of Fame pitcher, and using the services of Carlton's flexibility coach, Gus Hoefling. He also felt being around seasoned and successful players with a winning attitude, like the 1983 Phillies' Mike Schmidt, Pete Rose, Joe Morgan, Tony Perez and Carlton (with whom he developed a close friendship), among others, made him more successful; as did the excellent pitch calling of Phillies catchers Tim McCarver and Bob Boone. Denny also attributed his success and an improved attitude to becoming a Christian. The latter helped him overcome his more typical history of internal conflict during his career, and the bitterness in his mind over his father abandoning him as a child, which had affected his life and playing performance.

He was the losing pitcher in Game 2 of the 1983 National League Championship Series against Fernando Valenzuela and the Los Angeles Dodgers, giving up three runs in six innings of a 4–1 loss; but the Phillies won the series in four games, and went on to the World Series. The Phillies "Wheeze Kids" team lost the 1983 World Series in five games to the Baltimore Orioles. Denny won the first game of the Series, 2–1, giving up only one run in 7.2 innings pitched. He was the losing pitcher in Game 4, giving up four runs in 5.1 innings.

Claude Osteen, who had been Denny's pitching coach for four years in St. Louis, and coached him for the 1983 Phillies, said that Denny had earned the right to start Game 1 of the World Series. He said Denny was always a skilled pitcher, but had improved both his curveball and fastball that season. Moreover, Osteen observed the significant change in Denny's attitude from the player with a "short fuse" to one "who doesn't fight the umpires, himself or the manager anymore".

Denny's injury issues returned during the last three years of his career, such as elbow and nerve problems. After starting 36 games in 1983, he started only 22 games in 1984, going 7–7 with a 2.45 ERA. In 1985, he started 33 games, going 11–14, with a 3.82 ERA.

=== Cincinnati Reds ===
He was traded along with Jeff Gray from the Phillies to the Reds for Tom Hume and Gary Redus on December 11, 1985. He started 27 games for the Reds in 1986, going 11–10, with a 4.20 ERA. It was his final season. The Reds did not pick up Denny’s option for 1987. Manager Pete Rose (a 1983 Phillies’ teammate) favored keeping Denny, but the team was concerned, at least in part, about Denny’s poor and at times antagonistic relationship with Cincinnati’s sports media.

Denny finished his 13-year injury plagued career with a 123–108 record, 3.59 ERA in 322 starts, and a career 31.1 WAR. He had 1,146 strikeouts and 778 bases on balls in 2,148.2 innings pitched.

== Coaching career ==
In November 2000, Denny was living in Tucson, Arizona when he was hired by the Arizona Diamondbacks to work as a general pitching coach during spring training, extended spring training and the fall instructional league; as well as to work closely with all players undergoing injury rehabilitation at the team's minor league complex. Denny remained the rehabilitation coach for the Diamondbacks from 2001 to 2004. He saw his goal as a rehabilitation coach to keep the players upbeat.

== Personal life ==
In addition to President Ronald Reagan attending Denny's Game 1 victory in the 1983 World Series, Denny's father, who had abandoned him as a five-year old child, flew from Australia to attend the game. Denny had recently become a Christian, and had just begun the process of attempting to overcome decades of internal conflict, and was striving to find forgiveness for his father. After the season ended, Reagan invited Denny to a state dinner at the White House. After retiring, he spent a year involved with building a sports camp in St. Louis for the Fellowship of Christian Athletes.

Denny move to Tucson, Arizona in 1990, and Memphis, Tennessee in 2005, where he began a business, the JAD Baseball Experience, giving private pitching lessons.
