= Shane Rawley =

American baseball player (born 1955)

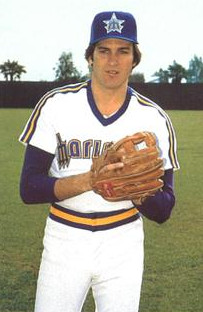
- Rawley in 1981
- Pitcher
- Born: July 27, 1955 (age 69); Racine, Wisconsin, U.S.
- Batted: Right Threw: Left

MLB debut
- April 6, 1978, for the Seattle Mariners

Last MLB appearance
- September 17, 1989, for the Minnesota Twins

MLB statistics
- Win–loss record: 111–118
- Earned run average: 4.02
- Strikeouts: 991
- Stats at Baseball Reference

Teams
- Seattle Mariners (1978–1981); New York Yankees (1982–1984); Philadelphia Phillies (1984–1988); Minnesota Twins (1989)

Career highlights and awards
- All-Star (1986)

Shane William Rawley (born July 27, 1955) is an American former professional baseball pitcher. He played in Major League Baseball from 1978 through 1989 for the Seattle Mariners, New York Yankees, Philadelphia Phillies, and Minnesota Twins.

Rawley began his MLB career as a relief pitcher with the Mariners and became a starting pitcher with the Yankees. He was selected to the National League All-Star team in 1986 as a member of the Phillies. The next year, he won a career-high 17 games, leading the NL in games started with 36. In his major league career, Rawley had a 111–118 win–loss record with 991 strikeouts and a 4.02 earned run average (ERA).

== Career ==
Rawley attended William Horlick High School in Racine, Wisconsin. He starred on the baseball and basketball teams, and was named All-City for basketball as a senior. Rawley graduated in 1973 and enrolled at Indian Hills Community College (IHCC) for the 1973–1974 academic year. Playing for their college baseball team, he had a 6–2 win–loss record with 63 strikeouts while allowing 30 hits and 19 runs. The Montreal Expos selected him in the 1974 MLB draft. On May 27, 1977, the Expos traded Rawley and Ángel Torres to the Cincinnati Reds to complete an earlier trade for Santo Alcalá. After the 1977 season, the Reds traded Rawley to the Seattle Mariners for Dave Collins.

Rawley made his major league debut with the Mariners in April 1978. He pitched as a setup reliever and had a 7–7 win–loss record and 13 saves in the 1980 season. He broke his foot in January 1981 and struggled when he returned. He had a 0–3 with a 4.41 earned run average at the time of the 1981 MLB strike. On April 1, 1982, the Mariners traded Rawley to the New York Yankees for Bill Caudill, Gene Nelson, and a player to be named later. On April 6, the Yankees sent Bobby Brown to Seattle to complete the trade. The Yankees transitioned Rawley into a starting pitcher in July 1982 and he had a 11–10 win–loss record as a starter. After the 1982 season, the Yankees signed Rawley to a four-year contract.

On June 30, 1984, the Yankees traded Rawley to the Philadelphia Phillies for Marty Bystrom and Keith Hughes. Rawley was named to the 1986 Major League Baseball All-Star Game and finished the season with 11 wins and a 3.54 ERA. In 1987 he finished the year as the Phillies ace, compiling a 17-11 record with a 4.39 ERA, leading the National League in games started. Though his 17 wins were the second-most in the National League, he did not receive any votes for the Cy Young Award. Rawley was the Phillies' Opening Day starting pitcher for the 1987 and 1988 seasons.

After the 1988 season, the Phillies traded Rawley and cash considerations to the Minnesota Twins for Tom Herr, Eric Bullock, and Tom Nieto. In 1989, he had a 5–12 record and a 5.21 ERA and became a free agent after the season. Rawley signed with the Boston Red Sox for the 1990 season, but they released him at the end of spring training. He completed his major league career with a 111–118 record, a 4.02 ERA, 991 strikeouts, and 40 saves.

== Personal life ==
In the 1980s, Rawley contributed to the building of a softball complex in Yorkville, Wisconsin, and co-owned it for several years before selling his share.

Rawley was inducted into the Racine County Sports Hall of Fame in 2011 and the IHCC Athletic Hall of Fame in 2014.

After retiring from baseball, he has owned Shaner's Pizzeria in Sarasota, Florida, since August 2011. In 2023, he published a novel about a baseball player who fought in the Vietnam War.
