= Don Carman =

American baseball player (born 1959)

- Pitcher
- Born: August 14, 1959 (age 66); Oklahoma City, Oklahoma, U.S.
- Batted: Left Threw: Left

MLB debut
- October 1, 1983, for the Philadelphia Phillies

Last MLB appearance
- July 18, 1992, for the Texas Rangers

MLB statistics
- Win–loss record: 53–54
- Earned run average: 4.11
- Strikeouts: 598
- Stats at Baseball Reference

Teams
- Philadelphia Phillies (1983–1990); Cincinnati Reds (1991); Texas Rangers (1992)

Donald Wayne Carman (born August 14, 1959) is an American former professional baseball left-handed pitcher who played in Major League Baseball (MLB) for the Philadelphia Phillies, Cincinnati Reds, and Texas Rangers. He is currently a sport psychologist for the Boras Corporation.

== Career ==
Signed by the Philadelphia Phillies as an amateur free agent in 1978 after attending Leedey High School in Leedey, Oklahoma where Carman had led the team to the 1975 Oklahoma State Title.

Carman made his Major League Baseball debut with the Philadelphia Phillies on October 1, 1983, and appeared in his final game on July 18, 1992.

During his ten-season career he appeared in 342 games, 102 as a starter. National League "top ten" achievements include:

- 1985 – games pitched – 4th (71)
- 1986 – winning percentage – 8th (.667)
- 1987 – wins – 9th (13)
- 1987 – games started – 4th (35)
- 1987 – innings pitched – 10th (211)

Other career highlights include:

- a one-hit, complete game shutout vs. the New York Mets in front of 30,799 fans at Veterans Stadium (September 29, 1987)
- a three-hit, complete game shutout vs. the San Diego Padres (May 16, 1987)
- a four-hit, complete game shutout vs. the Pittsburgh Pirates (September 15, 1986)
- held All-Stars Craig Biggio, Ken Griffey Jr., Jeffrey Leonard, Pete Rose, Larry Walker, and Matt Williams to a .025 collective batting average (1-for-40)
- All Stars Tony Gwynn, Tony Pena, Darryl Strawberry, Gary Carter, and Tim Raines hit a collective .364 (67 for 184)

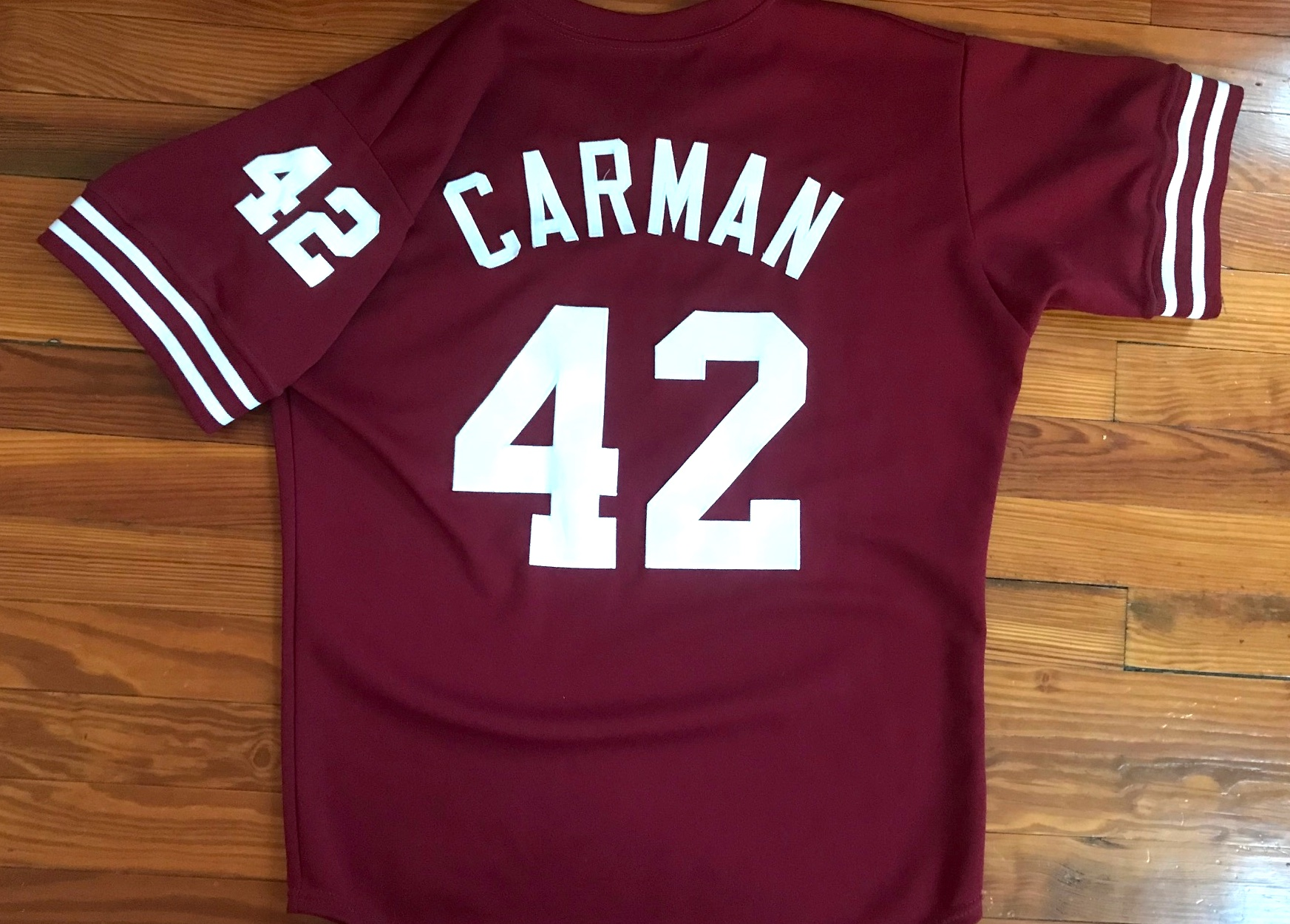
1986 Philadelphia Phillies #42 Don Carman Batting Practice jersey

Carman started the 1986 season as a reliever with a 3–2 record and one save in 11 opportunities. The team moved Carman to the starting rotation where he would go 7–3 with a 2.43 ERA the rest of the season. On May 16, 1986, Carman pitched a three-hit shut out against the San Diego Padres.

On August 20, 1986, Carman took a perfect game into the ninth inning against the San Francisco Giants at Candlestick Park. Giants catcher Bob Brenly hit a long drive into the gap in left-center field. Phillies center fielder Milt Thompson was positioned to make a running catch but the ball hit the base of his glove and was ruled a hit. Carman pitched nine innings, gave up one hit, and was the winner when the Phillies scored in the top of the tenth on a Juan Samuel solo homer to win the game 1–0.

In 1987, Carman won six of his last nine decisions, and led the Phillies in ERA, strikeouts, and shutouts.

In 1989, Carman went 3–13 with a 5.58 ERA as a starter; 2–2 with a 4.31 ERA as a reliever; and finished the season tied for the league lead in losses with 15. The Phillies made Carman a full time relief pitcher in 1990; he made 59 appearances, going 6–2 with a 4.15 ERA. The Phillies granted Carman free agency after the 1990 season.

Carman's career totals include a record of 53–54, 598 strikeouts, 11 saves, 83 games finished, and an ERA of 4.11.

In a 2011 article, Carman was listed as the second-worst-hitting pitcher of all time, behind only Ron Herbel, a pitcher for the Giants in the 1960s. In 239 career plate appearances, Carman had 12 hits (all singles), two walks, 75 strikeouts, and an .057 batting average.

Carman was also known for his sense of humor; tired of repetitive postgame questions from sports reporters, in the 1990 season he posted a handwritten list of 37 standard responses on his locker and invited reporters to take their pick. The list, including clichés like "I'd rather be lucky than good" and "We're going to take the season one game at a time," was eventually published in several newspapers in its entirety.

After his retirement, Carman settled with his family in Naples, Florida. He earned a degree in sports psychology from Florida Gulf Coast University in Fort Myers, Florida. The December 6, 2006 issue of the Tampa Bay Times revealed in its sports column that Carman recently wrote replies to all the fan letters he had received (he had kept the letters but did not respond to them at the time).
