= Dave Rucker =

American baseball player (born 1957)

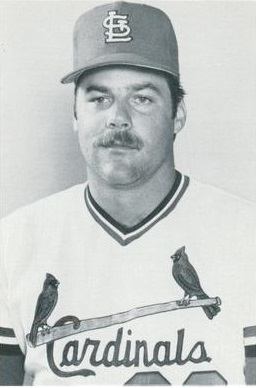
- Pitcher
- Born: September 1, 1957 (age 68); San Bernardino, California, U.S.
- Batted: Left Threw: Left

MLB debut
- April 12, 1981, for the Detroit Tigers

Last MLB appearance
- October 2, 1988, for the Pittsburgh Pirates

MLB statistics
- Win–loss record: 16–20
- Earned run average: 3.72
- Strikeouts: 170
- Stats at Baseball Reference

Teams
- Detroit Tigers (1981–1983); St. Louis Cardinals (1983–1984); Philadelphia Phillies (1985–1986); Pittsburgh Pirates (1988)

David Michael Rucker (born September 1, 1957) is an American former professional baseball pitcher who played in Major League Baseball (MLB) from 1981 to 1988, primarily as a relief pitcher. Rucker attended Eisenhower High School and University of LaVerne where he was drafted in 1978 by the Detroit Tigers and joined the big league team, in 1981. In 1983, he was traded to the St. Louis Cardinals for Doug Bair. In 1985, Rucker was traded to the Philadelphia Phillies for Bill Campbell and Iván DeJesús. His MLB career came to an end, following the 1988 season, spent with the Pittsburgh Pirates.
