= Kevin Gross =

American baseball player (born 1961)

- Pitcher
- Born: June 8, 1961 (age 64); Downey, California, U.S.
- Batted: Right Threw: Right

MLB debut
- June 25, 1983, for the Philadelphia Phillies

Last MLB appearance
- July 25, 1997, for the Anaheim Angels

MLB statistics
- Win–loss record: 142–158
- Earned run average: 4.11
- Strikeouts: 1,727
- Stats at Baseball Reference

Teams
- Philadelphia Phillies (1983–1988); Montreal Expos (1989–1990); Los Angeles Dodgers (1991–1994); Texas Rangers (1995–1996); Anaheim Angels (1997)

Career highlights and awards
- All-Star (1988); Pitched a no-hitter on August 17, 1992

Kevin Frank Gross (born June 8, 1961) is an American former Major League Baseball pitcher who played from 1983 through 1997.

Gross played for the Philadelphia Phillies (1983–1988), Montreal Expos (1989–1990), Los Angeles Dodgers (1991–1994), Texas Rangers (1995–1996), and Anaheim Angels (1997). He made his Major League Baseball debut on June 25, 1983, pitching 6 1/3 innings, surrendering 2 earned runs to the New York Mets en route to a 4–2 victory. He played his final game on July 25, 1997.

On August 10, 1987, Gross was caught ball scuffing; he had sandpaper in his glove, and he was suspended for 10 games. He was selected to the National League All-Star team in 1988. On August 17, 1992, as a member of the Los Angeles Dodgers, Gross threw a no-hitter versus their rivals, the San Francisco Giants, in a 2–0 victory.

On September 9, 1986, Gross surrendered the first of Rafael Palmeiro's 569 career home runs.

On May 14, 1990, pitching for the Expos in Los Angeles, Gross and Dodgers starter Fernando Valenzuela accomplished the rare feat of hitting homers off each other in the same inning.

As a hitter, Gross posted a .161 batting average (106-for-660) with 41 runs, 6 home runs, 36 RBI and 31 bases on balls.

In 2002, he was named to the Ventura County Sports Hall of Fame.

== See also ==
- List of Major League Baseball no-hitters

Preceded by Kent Mercker, Mark Wohlers, & Alejandro Peña	No-hitter pitcher August 17, 1992	Succeeded by Chris Bosio
