= Doug Sisk =

American baseball player (born 1957)

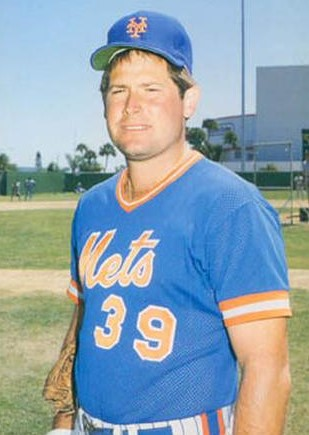
- Pitcher
- Born: September 26, 1957 (age 69); Renton, Washington, U.S.
- Batted: Right Threw: Right

MLB debut
- September 6, 1982, for the New York Mets

Last MLB appearance
- May 23, 1991, for the Atlanta Braves

MLB statistics
- Win–loss record: 22–20
- Earned run average: 3.27
- Strikeouts: 195
- Saves: 33
- Stats at Baseball Reference

Teams
- New York Mets (1982–1987); Baltimore Orioles (1988); Atlanta Braves (1990–1991)

Career highlights and awards
- World Series champion (1986)

Douglas Randall Sisk (born September 26, 1957), is an American former Major League Baseball relief pitcher. His primary pitch was a sinker that was difficult for batters to drive in the air.

== Early years ==
Sisk earned all-league honors both seasons he spent playing college baseball at Green River Community College. From there, he spent two more seasons with the Washington State University Cougars before signing as an amateur free agent with the New York Mets in 1980. In his first season of professional baseball with the Kingsport Mets, Sisk went 8–5 with a 2.66 earned run average as a starting pitcher. He was moved into the bullpen the following season with the Lynchburg Mets. Over three seasons in the Mets' farm system, Sisk was 25–14 with a 2.88 ERA, sixteen saves and 170 strikeouts to earn a September call up in 1982.

== New York Mets ==
Sisk made his Major League debut on September 6 against the Pittsburgh Pirates, pitching a scoreless inning. On September 15, he faced one batter, Andre Dawson, in an extra innings contest with the Montreal Expos. Dawson took him deep to left field for his first career loss. Over the remainder of the season, Sisk pitched six innings, and allowed just one hit, picking up his first career save on September 22 against the Chicago Cubs.

The 1983 season opener marked the return of Tom Seaver in a Mets uniform. Seaver pitched six scoreless innings, matched by fellow future Hall of Famer Steve Carlton. Sisk entered in the seventh, and held the Philadelphia Phillies scoreless for the combined shutout. Meanwhile, the Mets broke through with two in the seventh to give Sisk his first career win. For the season, he went 5–4 with a 2.24 ERA as the right-handed complement to Jesse Orosco. His eleven saves were second to Orosco's seventeen.

He was having a similarly stellar 1984 season until he developed a sore shoulder. Through June 8, Sisk had allowed only three earned runs through 53.2 innings pitched for an 0.47 ERA. His ERA crept up to 1.40 by the time he took the mound to face the Cubs on July 28.

The Mets were in first place in the National League East, 4.5 games up on the Cubs. Sisk entered the game in the eighth with the score tied at three. He walked the first batter he faced. He uncorked a wild pitch before giving up singles to the next two. He then misplayed a bunt for an error before exiting the game to a booing Shea Stadium crowd. Shortly afterwards, he was placed on the disabled list. He was effective upon his return (9.1 IP, 2 ER), but was by then a target of the Shea Stadium boo birds despite ending the season with a 2.09 ERA.

Lingering injuries hindered Sisk in 1985. Opposing batters were hitting .337, and his ERA was 8.53 when he was sent down to triple A Tidewater in early May. Despite going 0–2 with a 7.20 ERA for the Tidewater Tides, he returned to the Mets in late May. By then, Roger McDowell had emerged as the right-handed closer for the Mets, and Sisk was pretty much relegated to "mop up duty."

Shortly after his return, he pitched his best game of the season (4 IP, 1 hit) for his second save, This was followed by three consecutive losses, the second of which came against the rival St. Louis Cardinals. Entering a 1–1 tie in the thirteenth inning, Sisk allowed six runs (5 ER). From there, he settled down, going 3–0 with a 2.95 ERA until elbow surgery ended his season in mid-September.

The elbow surgery had Sisk rehabbing in Tidewater to start the 1986 season. After nine games and thirty innings, Sisk returned to the Mets in late May. In his first appearance, he allowed two runs in one inning in a 10–2 blowout at the hands of the San Francisco Giants. From there, he went 2–1 with a 0.47 ERA in nine appearances through July 2. A rough month of July (5.30 ERA) cost him the trust of manager Davey Johnson, and he spent the rest of the season pitching almost exclusively in blowouts. That said, he pitched well, going 2–0 with a 2.62 ERA and one save. He did not allow a home run all season.

In the postseason, Sisk pitched a scoreless inning in game four of the 1986 National League Championship Series and a scoreless .2 of an inning in game two of the World Series, both losses.

Sisk had a decent 1987 season (3–1, 3.46 ERA, 3 SV), but was still being used for mop up duty by Davey Johnson, and was still drawing the ire of the fans. As the ire began to spill more and more off the field, he requested a trade. After the season, he was sent to the Baltimore Orioles for minor league pitcher Blaine Beatty and a player to be named later.

== Baltimore Orioles ==
The 1988 Orioles got off to a historically bad start. They set a modern record by losing their first 21 games to start the season. Sisk actually pitched well during that stretch. He lost one game, and allowed three earned runs in 14.1 innings. He was 3–2 with a 3.22 ERA when tendinitis cost him a month of the season. After a brief rehab stint in triple A, he pitched thirteen innings before allowing a run. However, he then began developing knee problems, and had a 6.10 ERA over his final fifteen appearances.

Overall, he went 3–3 with a 3.72 ERA. He led the Orioles bullpen with 94.1 innings in relief, and tied for the team lead in appearances with 52. After the season, he had reconstructive surgery on both knees that caused him to miss the entire 1989 season.

== Atlanta Braves ==
After the surgery, Sisk's career went through something of a whirlwind that briefly had him back with the Mets. He signed as a free agent with the Cleveland Indians prior to Spring training 1990. After posting a 7.04 ERA in eight appearances with the triple A Colorado Springs Sky Sox, he was released, and re-signed with the Mets. He was 5–1 with a 2.81 ERA at Tidewater when he was traded to the Atlanta Braves for minor leaguer Tony Valle on July 22. He appeared in three games for the Braves, pitching 2.1 innings, and allowing one run.

On April 16, 1991, Sisk got his first major league win in nearly three years. It came against the Astros. He would go 2–1 with a 5.02 ERA before tendinitis landed him back on the DL. He played nine games for the triple A Richmond Braves, was released after the season, and never returned to the major leagues.

== Career stats ==
W	L	Pct	ERA	G	GS	GF	SV	IP	H	ER	R	HR	BB	K	WP	HBP	BAA	Fld%	Avg.
22	20	.524	3.27	332	0	161	33	523.1	527	190	238	15	267	195	15	20	.262	.963	.105

During his nine-year major-league career, Sisk allowed only 15 home runs in over 500 innings. His only career run batted in came on June 11, 1985. The Mets were already losing 16–0 in the second inning when Sisk entered the game. Batting in the third inning, Sisk grounded out to shortstop Steve Jeltz. Clint Hurdle scored from third for the Mets' first run. Sisk also pitched 2.1 scoreless innings that allowed the Mets to cut the deficit to 16–7. He was lifted in the fifth for a pinch hitter. Promptly afterwards, the Phillies scored ten more off Joe Sambito.

He was part of the notorious "Scum Bunch" as a Met, along with Orosco and left fielder Danny Heep.

During the 1994–95 players strike, baseball's owners planned to start the 1995 season with replacement players. The 37 year old attended training camp with the Mets until the strike ended on March 28.

After retiring, Sisk became the athletic director of a Boys and Girls Club and then a sales representative for Unique Wine Company, a wine importer and distributor based in his hometown of Renton, Washington.
