= Charles Hudson (baseball) =

American baseball player (born 1959)

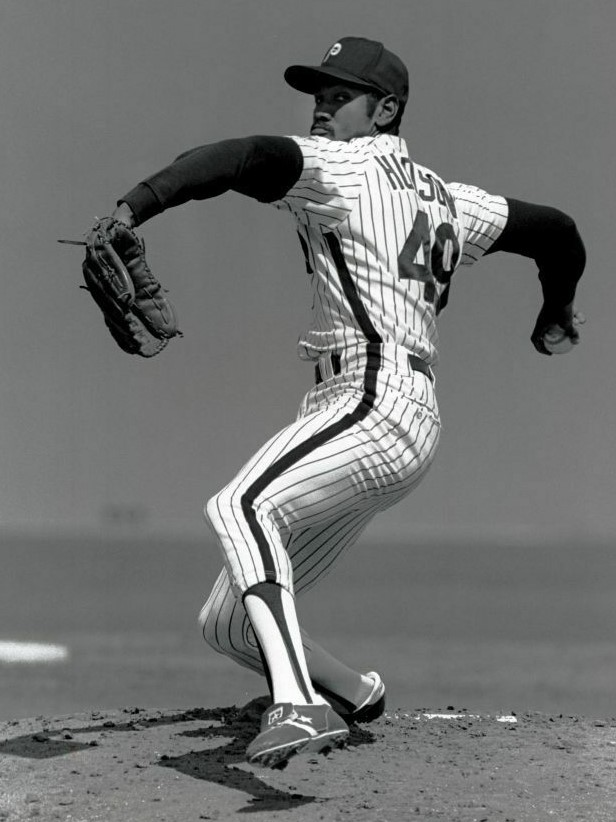
- Pitcher
- Born: March 16, 1959 (age 67); Ennis, Texas, U.S.
- Batted: Right Threw: Right

MLB debut
- May 31, 1983, for the Philadelphia Phillies

Last MLB appearance
- August 11, 1989, for the Detroit Tigers

MLB statistics
- Win–loss record: 50–60
- Earned run average: 4.14
- Strikeouts: 580
- Stats at Baseball Reference

Teams
- Philadelphia Phillies (1983–1986); New York Yankees (1987–1988); Detroit Tigers (1989)

Charles Lynn Hudson (born March 16, 1959) is an American former professional baseball starting pitcher, who played in Major League Baseball (MLB) for the Philadelphia Phillies, New York Yankees, and Detroit Tigers, from 1983 to 1989.

== Early life ==
Hudson was born in Ennis, Texas and graduated from South Oak Cliff High School, before attending Prairie View A & M University (Texas A & M University System).

== Baseball career ==
=== Philadelphia Phillies ===
Hudson was drafted in 1981 by the Philadelphia Phillies and joined the major league team in 1983. In the Fall of his rookie season, Hudson started two games in the 1983 World Series and was the losing pitcher in both games.

=== New York Yankees ===
In 1987, Hudson was traded to the New York Yankees for Tom Barrett and Mike Easler. He played for the Yankees for two seasons, then was traded again to the Detroit Tigers for Tom Brookens.

=== Detroit Tigers ===
In August 1989, Hudson, while driving drunk, crashed his Mercury Cougar into a telephone pole in a Detroit suburb. Hudson broke his left leg and his right knee needed reconstructive surgery. Hudson would later discuss how he began to drink as he struggled in his baseball career. Hudson was invited to spring training in 1995 by the Chicago Cubs.
