= Freddie Toliver =

American baseball player (born 1961)

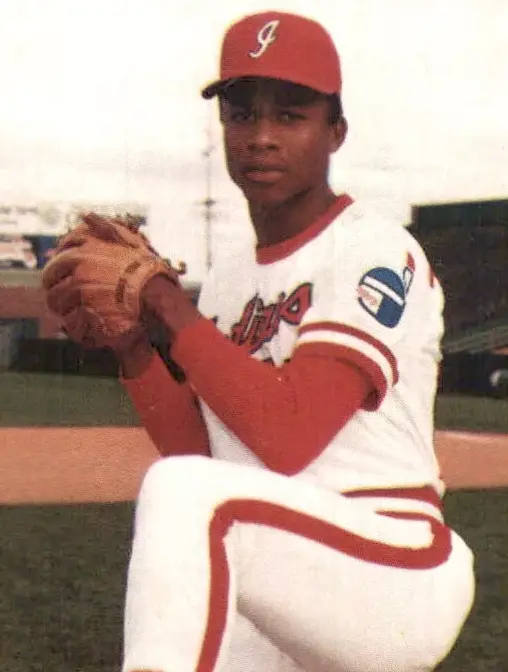
- Tolliver with the Indianapolis Indians c. 1983
- Pitcher
- Born: February 3, 1961 (age 65); Natchez, Mississippi, U.S.
- Batted: Right Threw: Right

Professional debut
- MLB: September 15, 1984, for the Cincinnati Reds
- CPBL: August 21, 1994, for the Wei Chuan Dragons

Last appearance
- MLB: July 4, 1993, for the Pittsburgh Pirates
- CPBL: July 27, 1996, for the Wei Chuan Dragons

MLB statistics
- Win–loss record: 10–16
- Earned run average: 4.73
- Strikeouts: 180

CPBL statistics
- Win–loss record: 18–19
- Earned run average: 3.50
- Strikeouts: 188
- Stats at Baseball Reference

Teams
- Cincinnati Reds (1984); Philadelphia Phillies (1985–1987); Minnesota Twins (1988–1989); San Diego Padres (1989); Pittsburgh Pirates (1993); Wei Chuan Dragons (1994–1996)

Freddie Lee Toliver (born February 3, 1961) is an American former professional baseball pitcher. He played for the Minnesota Twins, Cincinnati Reds, Philadelphia Phillies, San Diego Padres, and Pittsburgh Pirates of Major League Baseball (MLB).

Freddie was selected by the New York Yankees in the 3rd round (77th overall) of the 1979 MLB June Amateur Draft out of San Gorgonio High School in San Bernardino, California.
