= Mickey Mahler =

American baseball player (born 1952)

- Pitcher
- Born: July 30, 1952 (age 74); Montgomery, Alabama, U.S.
- Batted: Switch Threw: Left

MLB debut
- September 13, 1977, for the Atlanta Braves

Last MLB appearance
- September 2, 1986, for the Toronto Blue Jays

MLB statistics
- Win–loss record: 14–32
- Earned run average: 4.68
- Strikeouts: 262
- Stats at Baseball Reference

Teams
- Atlanta Braves (1977–1979); Pittsburgh Pirates (1980); California Angels (1981–1982); Montreal Expos (1985); Detroit Tigers (1985); Texas Rangers (1986); Toronto Blue Jays (1986)

Michael James Mahler (born July 30, 1952) is an American former Major League Baseball pitcher. He played during eight seasons at the major league level for the Atlanta Braves, Pittsburgh Pirates, California Angels, Montreal Expos, Detroit Tigers, Texas Rangers, and Toronto Blue Jays. A graduate of Trinity University in San Antonio, he was drafted by the Braves in the 10th round of the 1974 amateur draft. Mahler played his first professional season with their Double-A Savannah Braves in 1974, and his last with the St. Louis Cardinals' Triple-A Louisville Redbirds in 1987. He is the brother of the late pitcher Rick Mahler. The brothers were teammates playing for the Triple-A Richmond Braves before each was called up to Atlanta.

Mahler threw hard and had a big slow 12-6 curveball. He was involved in a number of historic moments during his short career.

== Pitching in a game with his brother ==
On September 25, 1979, Mahler and his brother, Rick Mahler, appeared in a major league game together as Braves teammates, in a game against the Houston Astros at Atlanta–Fulton County Stadium. Mickey Mahler gave up two runs in two innings, while his brother, Rick, pitched one scoreless inning.

== One-hit shutout in 1985 ==
On June 5, 1985, Mahler pitched the best game of his major league career, a one-hitter for the Expos in his first big league shutout in a 6–0 victory over the Giants at Candlestick Park. Mahler yielded his lone hit to Dan Gladden. It also was Mahler's first complete game since 1979. "So much of the game is luck," Mahler told reporters after the game. "I didn't feel I pitched that well--not that I pitched that badly--but the wind here can help a pitcher. It held up a lot of balls that might have been hit out or gone through the gaps in the outfield. I owe a lot of appreciation to the people in the Montreal organization who gave me the opportunity to pitch in the majors again. I felt like I had a lot to prove to people with other clubs that didn't keep me. No matter what I do from now on, they can't take away that game I just pitched."

Mahler pitched two no-hitters while in the minor leagues. On June 1, 1977, Mahler threw a no-hitter for the Richmond Braves AAA team against the Toledo Mud Hens. In 1974 he no-hit the Birmingham Barons (Double A team for the Oakland A's) of the Southern League.

== Other noteworthy outings ==
On September 18, 1985, Mahler pitched 7⅔ innings of one-hit relief to lead the Detroit Tigers to a 5–2 victory over the New York Yankees, thus denying a bid by Phil Niekro to win his 300th game. Mahler, who relieved Juan Berenguer after he got into trouble in the first inning, retired 23 of the 25 hitters he faced, including the first 15 hitters who came up against him. A former teammate of Niekro's, Mahler told reporters after the game that "The thing I remember most about (Niekro) is what a great guy he was. I didn't think about the Niekro thing at all. I hated to be the one to beat him but that's the game."

In that same game, New York Yankees manager Billy Martin sent left-handed-hitter Mike Pagliarulo up to bat right-handed against Mahler. Detroit Tigers catcher Bob Melvin was reported to have asked Pagliarulo, "What the hell are you doing?" Pagliarulo's reply: "I'm trying to get a base hit!" Ultimately, however, Pagliarulo took a called third strike.

On July 7, 1986, Mahler gave up the 2,000th hit to Dave Winfield.

On September 2, 1986, Mahler plunked Brett Butler in the shoulder and immediately was removed the game, which Mahler's Blue Jays lost 9–5 to the Cleveland Indians. He would only pitch in one more game.

== Witticisms ==
Throughout his career, Mahler had a rapport with the press. In 1986, he told USA Today, "If I were commissioner, I'd send every major league player down to Triple-A after three years to see how good they have it now," only to be sent down to Triple-A the following day, on July 29, 1986.

In 1986, after hitting Cleveland's Brett Butler with a pitch, Mahler told reporters, "The thing is, the signal here for the fastball is the signal for the curve in Texas and Oklahoma. When I got the sign, my mind said 'curve.' I took my grip, went into the stretch, kicked up the leg and, right in the middle of my motion, it dawned on me 'fastball.' I wound up trying to change my grip mid-motion."

In reflecting on his career as a journeyman, Mahler told the Toronto Star in 1986: "It's not a pleasant way to spend a career, but the memories will be incredible. I've played with Reggie Jackson and Rod Carew and Dale Murphy, I've learned from Tom House and (Johnny) Sain, the two best pitching coaches in the business. I've been around, seen the best. It's not so bad a life. This is the best job in the world and I'll do anything they say - chalk the field before the game, sweep the dugout."
