= Tom Gorman (1980s pitcher) =

American baseball player (born 1957)

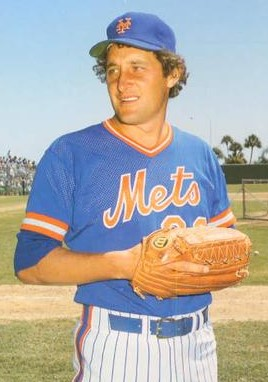
- Pitcher
- Born: December 16, 1957 (age 68); Portland, Oregon, U.S.
- Batted: Left Threw: Left

MLB debut
- September 2, 1981, for the Montreal Expos

Last MLB appearance
- April 24, 1987, for the San Diego Padres

MLB statistics
- Win–loss record: 12–10
- Earned run average: 4.34
- Strikeouts: 144
- Stats at Baseball Reference

Teams
- Montreal Expos (1981–1982); New York Mets (1982–1985); Philadelphia Phillies (1986); San Diego Padres (1987)

Thomas Patrick Gorman (born December 16, 1957) is an American former professional baseball pitcher, who played in Major League Baseball (MLB) for the Montreal Expos, New York Mets, Philadelphia Phillies, and San Diego Padres, in all or part of seven seasons, from 1981 through 1987. His Mets teammate Keith Hernandez nicknamed him "Gorfax," a portmanteau of "Gorman" and "Koufax."

Born in Portland, Oregon, Gorman attended Woodburn High School in Woodburn, Oregon where he won a state high school baseball championship. He walked on to the college baseball team at Gonzaga University and played there from 1977 to 1980. In 1995, he was inducted to the Gonzaga Athletic Hall of Fame. Gorman was drafted by the Montreal Expos, in the 4th round (98th overall) of the 1980 Major League Baseball draft.

Over the course of Gorman’s MLB career, his stat line included 213 2/3 innings pitched, 52 total chances handled (12 putouts, 40 assists), without committing an error, for a perfect 1.000 fielding percentage.

As of 2017, Gorman is the pitching coach at Oregon City High School. Under Gorman’s guidance, the team won the 2012 6A State Championship.
