= Rick Mahler =

American baseball player (1953–2005)

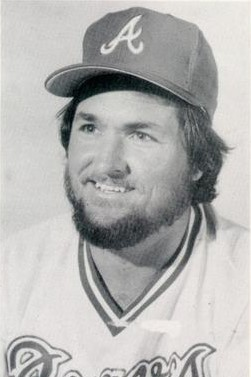
- Pitcher
- Born: August 5, 1953; Austin, Texas, U.S.
- Died: March 2, 2005 (aged 51); Jupiter, Florida, U.S.
- Batted: Right Threw: Right

MLB debut
- April 20, 1979, for the Atlanta Braves

Last MLB appearance
- August 6, 1991, for the Atlanta Braves

MLB statistics
- Win–loss record: 96–111
- Earned run average: 3.99
- Strikeouts: 952
- Stats at Baseball Reference

Teams
- Atlanta Braves (1979–1988); Cincinnati Reds (1989–1990); Montreal Expos (1991); Atlanta Braves (1991)

Career highlights and awards
- World Series champion (1990)

Richard Keith Mahler (/ˈmeɪ.lɜːr/; August 5, 1953 – March 2, 2005) was an American starting pitcher in Major League Baseball who played for the Atlanta Braves (1979–1988, 1991), Cincinnati Reds (1989–1990) and Montreal Expos (1991). His brother Mickey was a major league pitcher as well; the two were Braves teammates in 1979. The brothers had also played together for the Triple-A Richmond Braves.

In his 13-year career, Mahler posted a 96–111 record with 952 strikeouts and a 3.99 ERA in 1951.1 innings.

Born in Austin, Texas, Mahler graduated from John Jay High School and then attended Trinity University, both in San Antonio, Texas. After being signed by the Braves as an amateur free agent in 1975, he made his debut in the 1979 season.

Mahler started on opening day for the Braves in 1982, when Atlanta won the National League West title. He made four straight opening day starts beginning in 1985. In 1987, he tied an NL record with his third opening day shutout. His best season came in 1984, when he went 13-10 with a 3.12 ERA while hitting .296 at the plate. In 1985, he won his first 7 straight starts and ended up 17-15 with a 3.48 ERA. He pitched twice in the postseason, with the Braves in 1982, and with the 1990 World Series champion Cincinnati Reds. In postseason play, Mahler pitched 3 1/3 scoreless innings. Mahler was a key member of the 1990 Reds' pitching staff as a spot starter and reliever, going 7–6 and contributing four saves. He also appeared in ten games with the Montreal Expos in 1991 before returning to Atlanta in mid-season.

After retiring, Mahler served as a minor league pitching coach for the Kansas City Royals and the Florida Marlins, and he was a roving instructor for the St. Louis Cardinals. He also managed St. Louis' Double-A affiliate in the Texas League from 1996 to 1997.

Mahler died at age 51 of a heart attack at home in Jupiter, Florida, where he was preparing for his second season as a minor league pitching coach for the New York Mets.
