= Tim Burke (baseball) =

American baseball player

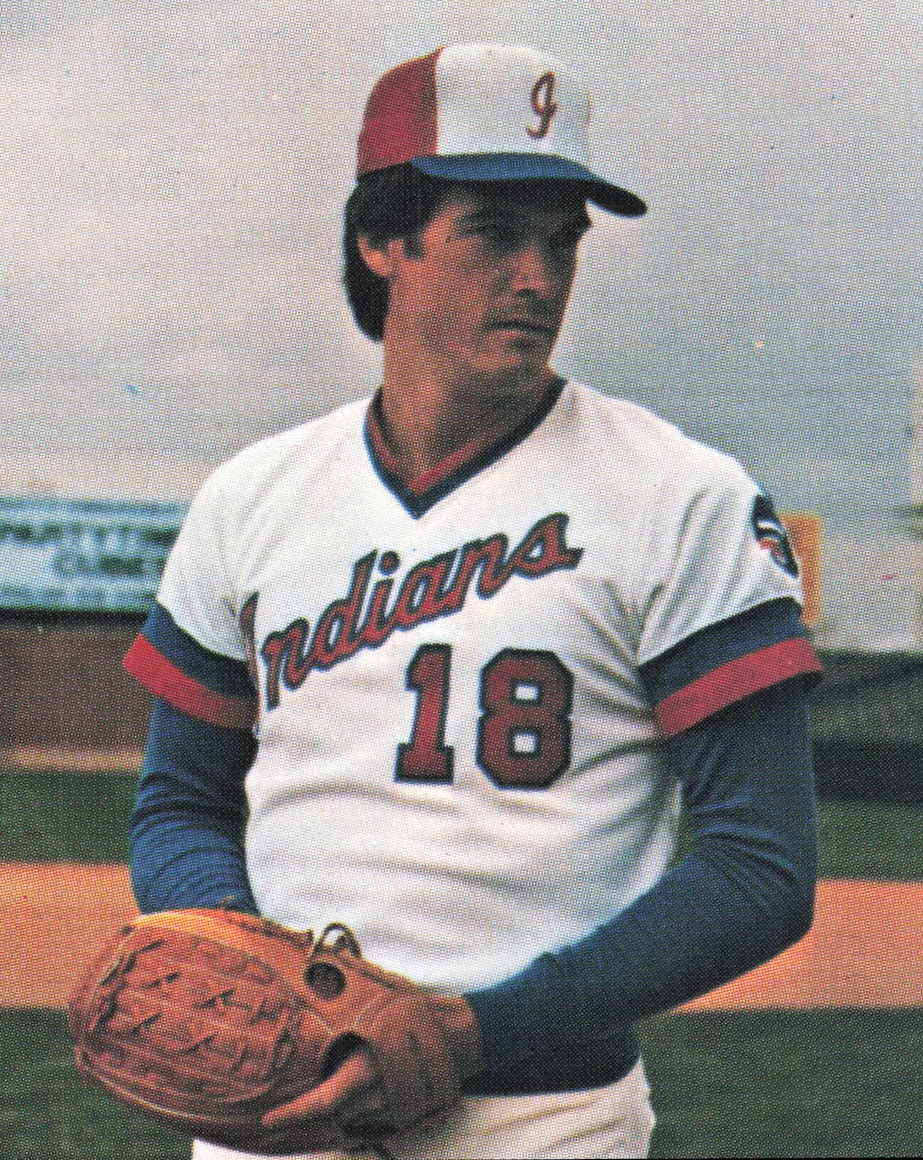
- Burke with the Indianapolis Indians c. 1984
- Pitcher
- Born: February 19, 1959 (age 67); Omaha, Nebraska, U.S.
- Batted: Right Threw: Right

MLB debut
- April 8, 1985, for the Montreal Expos

Last MLB appearance
- September 22, 1992, for the New York Yankees

MLB statistics
- Win–loss record: 49–33
- Earned run average: 2.72
- Strikeouts: 444
- Saves: 102
- Stats at Baseball Reference

Teams
- Montreal Expos (1985–1991); New York Mets (1991–1992); New York Yankees (1992)

Career highlights and awards
- All-Star (1989); Montreal Expos Hall of Fame

Timothy Phillip Burke (born February 19, 1959) is an American former Major League Baseball relief pitcher who played for the Montreal Expos, New York Mets, and New York Yankees. He batted and threw right-handed. Between 1987 and 1988, he briefly had the lowest career earned run average for a relief pitcher, and his career earned run average of 2.72 is lower than all Hall of Famer relief pitchers except for Mariano Rivera and Hoyt Wilhelm.

== Career ==
Drafted by the Pittsburgh Pirates in round two of the 1980 MLB draft, Burke was traded to the Yankees on December 22, 1982, and then after a year in New York's minor league system, was dealt to the Expos for outfielder Pat Rooney on December 20, 1983. Although he was primarily a starting pitcher over his four minor league seasons, he made his major league debut with the Expos on April 8, 1985, in relief. In an eight-season career, he posted a 49–33 record with a 2.72 ERA and 102 saves in 498 games pitched, all but two out of the bullpen. He led the National League in appearances in 1985, with 78. He was selected to the National League All-star team in 1989.

== Personal ==
Along with his wife, Christine, Burke adopted two orphan children from Korea, one from Vietnam, and one from Guatemala with the assistance of International Children Services in Eugene, Oregon. A born-again Christian, he retired from baseball in 1993 in order to help raise them. In 1994 he wrote a book called Major League Dad: The Moving Story of an All-Star Pitcher Who Gave up Baseball for His Family.

In 1995, Burke appeared in the Geoff Moore & the Distance music video for the song "Home Run".
