= 1985 Los Angeles Dodgers season =

1985 Los Angeles Dodgers
- National League West Champions
- League: National League
- Division: West
- Ballpark: Dodger Stadium
- City: Los Angeles
- Record: 95–67 (.586)
- Divisional place: 1st
- Owner: Peter O'Malley
- General managers: Al Campanis
- Managers: Tommy Lasorda
- Television: KTTV–TV 11; Vin Scully, Jerry Doggett, Ross Porter; Dodgervision; Eddie Doucette, Al Downing, Rick Monday
- Radio: KABC–AM 790; Vin Scully, Jerry Doggett, Ross Porter; KTNQ–AM 1020; Jaime Jarrín, René Cárdenas

The 1985 Los Angeles Dodgers season was the 96th season for the Los Angeles Dodgers franchise in Major League Baseball (MLB), their 28th season in Los Angeles, California, and their 24th season playing their home games at Dodger Stadium. The team lost to the St. Louis Cardinals in the NLCS. Fernando Valenzuela set a major league record for most consecutive innings at the start of a season without allowing an earned run (41).

== Offseason ==
- February 4, 1985: Acquired Al Oliver from the Philadelphia Phillies for Pat Zachry

== Regular season ==
=== Season standings ===
NL West
Team	W	L	Pct.	GB	Home	Road
Los Angeles Dodgers	95	67	.586	—	48‍–‍33	47‍–‍34
Cincinnati Reds	89	72	.553	5½	47‍–‍34	42‍–‍38
Houston Astros	83	79	.512	12	44‍–‍37	39‍–‍42
San Diego Padres	83	79	.512	12	44‍–‍37	39‍–‍42
Atlanta Braves	66	96	.407	29	32‍–‍49	34‍–‍47
San Francisco Giants	62	100	.383	33	38‍–‍43	24‍–‍57

=== Record vs. opponents ===
1985 National League record Sources:
Team	ATL	CHC	CIN	HOU	LAD	MON	NYM	PHI	PIT	SD	SF	STL
Atlanta	—	5–7	7–11	8–10	5–13	3–9	2–10	10–2	6–6	7–11	10–8	3–9
Chicago	7–5	—	5–6	5–7	5–7	7–11	4–14	13–5	13–5	8–4	6–6	4–14
Cincinnati	11–7	6–5	—	11–7	7–11	8–4	4–8	7–5	9–3	9–9	12–6	5–7
Houston	10–8	7–5	7–11	—	6–12	6–6	4–8	4–8	6–6	12–6	15–3	6–6
Los Angeles	13–5	7–5	11–7	12–6	—	7–5	7–5	4–8	8–4	8–10	11–7	7–5
Montreal	9–3	11–7	4–8	6–6	5–7	—	9–9	8–10	9–8	5–7	7–5	11–7
New York	10–2	14–4	8–4	8–4	5–7	9–9	—	11–7	10–8	7–5	8–4	8–10
Philadelphia	2-10	5–13	5–7	8–4	8–4	10–8	7–11	—	11–7	5–7	6–6	8–10
Pittsburgh	6–6	5–13	3–9	6–6	4–8	8–9	8–10	7–11	—	4–8	3–9	3–15
San Diego	11–7	4–8	9–9	6–12	10–8	7–5	5–7	7–5	8–4	—	12–6	4–8
San Francisco	8–10	6–6	6–12	3–15	7–11	5–7	4–8	6–6	9–3	6–12	—	2–10
St. Louis	9–3	14–4	7–5	6–6	5–7	7–11	10–8	10–8	15–3	8–4	10–2	—

=== Opening day lineup ===
Opening Day Starters
Name	Position
Mariano Duncan	Second baseman
Ken Landreaux	Center fielder
Al Oliver	Left fielder
Pedro Guerrero	Third baseman
Mike Marshall	Right fielder
Mike Scioscia	Catcher
Sid Bream	First baseman
Dave Anderson	Shortstop
Fernando Valenzuela	Starting pitcher

=== Roster ===
1985 Los Angeles Dodgers
Roster
Pitchers: 46 Tom Brennan; 37 Bobby Castillo; 27 Carlos Diaz; 55 Orel Hershiser; 50 Brian Holton; 40 Rick Honeycutt; 57 Steve Howe; 43 Ken Howell; 49 Tom Niedenfuer; 26 Alejandro Peña; 41 Jerry Reuss; 34 Fernando Valenzuela; 35 Bob Welch	Catchers: 15 Gilberto Reyes; 14 Mike Scioscia; 7 Steve Yeager; Infielders: 10 Dave Anderson; 21 Bob Bailor; 33 Sid Bream; 9 Greg Brock; 47,23 Enos Cabell; 25 Mariano Duncan; 52 Bill Madlock; 48 Mike Ramsey; 18 Bill Russell; 3 Steve Sax; 22 Franklin Stubbs	Outfielders: 46 Ralph Bryant; 47 José González; 28 Pedro Guerrero; 44 Ken Landreaux; 20 Candy Maldonado; 5 Mike Marshall; 17 Len Matuszek; 0 Al Oliver; 57 Stu Pederson; 23 R.J. Reynolds; 45 Terry Whitfield; 51 Reggie Williams; Other batters: 12 Jay Johnstone	Manager: 2 Tommy Lasorda; Coaches: 8 Joey Amalfitano; 54 Monty Basgall; 58 Mark Cresse; 37 Ben Hines; 11 Manny Mota; 16 Ron Perranoski

=== Notable Transactions ===
- July 9, 1985: Acquired Len Matuszek from the Toronto Blue Jays for Al Oliver
- July 10, 1985: Acquired Enos Cabell from the Houston Astros for Germán Rivera and Rafael Montalvo
- July 14, 1985: Henry Rodríguez was signed as an amateur free agent.
- August 31, 1985: Acquired Bill Madlock from the Pittsburgh Pirates for R.J. Reynolds, Sid Bream and Cecil Espy

== Game log ==
=== Regular season ===
Legend
	Dodgers win
	Dodgers loss
	Postponement
	Clinched division
**Bold**	Dodgers team member

1985 regular season game log: 95–67 (Home: 48–33; Away: 47–34)
April: 11–10 (Home: 5–5; Away: 6–5)

#	Date	Time (PT)	Opponent	Score	Win	Loss	Save	Time of Game	Attendance	Record	Box Streak
1	April 9	5:35 p.m. PST	@ Astros	L 1–2	Ryan (1–0)	**Valenzuela** (0–1)	DiPino (1)	2:19	42,876	0–1	L1
2	April 10	5:35 p.m. PST	@ Astros	**W** 5–4	**Reuss** (1–0)	Niekro (0–1)	**Howe** (1)	2:45	9,945	1–1	W1
3	April 11	10:35 a.m. PST	@ Astros	**W** 4–3	**Diaz** (1–0)	Dawley (0–1)	**Howell** (1)	2:25	5,793	2–1	W2
4	April 12	1:05 p.m. PST	Giants	L 1–4	Krukow (1–0)	**Honeycutt** (0–1)	–	2:32	46,910	2–2	L1
5	April 13	7:05 p.m. PST	Giants	**W** 1–0	**Valenzuela** (1–1)	Davis (0–1)	–	2:23	49,861	3–2	W1
6	April 14	1:05 p.m. PST	Giants	L 4–8	Gott (1–0)	**Reuss** (1–1)	Garrelts (1)	3:10	48,995	3–3	L1
7	April 15	7:35 p.m. PST	Astros	**W** 5–3	**Diaz** (2–0)	Niekro (0–2)	**Howell** (2)	2:42	26,541	4–3	W1
8	April 16	7:35 p.m. PST	Astros	L 3–7	Smith (2–0)	**Howe** (0–1)	–	2:53	32,155	4–4	L1
9	April 17	7:35 p.m. PST	Astros	**W** 1–0 (11)	**Hershiser** (1–0)	DiPino (0–1)	–	2:43	29,789	5–4	W1
10	April 18	1:05 p.m. PST	@ Padres	**W** 5–0	**Valenzuela** (2–1)	Thurmond (0–1)	–	2:06	38,024	6–4	W2
11	April 19	7:05 p.m. PST	@ Padres	L 2–11	Hoyt (1–1)	**Reuss** (1–2)	–	2:28	32,920	6–5	L1
12	April 20	7:05 p.m. PST	@ Padres	L 3–4 (10)	Gossage (1–0)	**Howell** (0–1)	–	3:08	42,003	6–6	L2
13	April 21	1:05 p.m. PST	@ Padres	**W** 2–0	**Hershiser** (2–0)	Dravecky (0–1)	–	2:28	42,574	7–6	W1
14	April 22	7:35 p.m. PST	@ Giants	**W** 3–2 (10)	**Niedenfuer** (1–0)	LaPoint (0–3)	–	2:36	24,512	8–6	W2
15	April 23	1:05 p.m. PST	@ Giants	L 1–2	Krukow (2–0)	**Valenzuela** (2–2)	–	2:10	19,022	8–7	L1
16	April 24	1:05 p.m. PST	@ Giants	**W** 4–2	**Brennan** (1–0)	Laskey (0–2)	**Howell** (3)	2:59	19,891	9–7	W1
17	April 25	7:35 p.m. PST	Padres	**W** 6–3	**Honeycutt** (1–1)	Show (2–1)	–	2:52	39,593	10–7	W2
18	April 26	7:35 p.m. PST	Padres	**W** 2–0	**Hershiser** (3–0)	Dravecky (0–2)	–	2:00	50,335	11–7	W3
19	April 27	7:05 p.m. PST	Padres	L 3–4	Hawkins (4–0)	**Brennan** (1–1)	Gossage (4)	2:28	49,801	11–8	L1
20	April 28	1:05 p.m. PDT	Padres	L 0–1	Lefferts (1–0)	**Valenzuela** (2–3)	Gossage (5)	2:07	48,726	11–9	L2
21	April 30	5:35 p.m. PDT	@ Cardinals	L 1–6	Andújar (4–0)	**Reuss** (1–3)	—	2:40	20,380	11–10	L3

May: 12–14 (Home: 5–5; Away: 7–9)

#	Date	Time (PT)	Opponent	Score	Win	Loss	Save	Time of Game	Attendance	Record	Box Streak
22	May 1	10:35 a.m. PDT	@ Cardinals	**W** 2–1 (12)	**Howell** (1–1)	Allen (0–2)	**Niedenfuer** (1)	3:40	14,324	12–10	W1
23	May 3	4:35 p.m. PDT	@ Pirates	L 2–16	McWilliams (3–1)	**Honeycutt** (1–2)	–	2:45	17,628	12–11	L1
24	May 4	11:15 a.m. PDT	@ Pirates	**W** 6–5 (10)	**Valenzuela** (3–3)	Candelaria (1–3)	–	2:48	14,093	13–11	W1
25	May 5	10:35 a.m. PDT	@ Pirates	L 2–3	Rhoden (2–3)	**Niedenfuer** (1–2)	Candelaria (5)	2:40	17,043	13–12	L1
26	May 6	11:20 a.m. PDT	@ Cubs	**W** 5–4 (10)	**Howell** (2–1)	Fontenot (0–1)	–	3:28	20,796	14–12	W1
27	May 7	11:20 a.m. PDT	@ Cubs	L 2–4	Ruthven (1–1)	**Brennan** (1–2)	Smith (7)	2:59	23,331	14–13	L1
28	May 8	7:35 p.m. PDT	Cardinals	**W** 5–2	**Honeycutt** (2–2)	Tudor (1–4)	**Howell** (4)	2:28	33,748	15–13	W1
29	May 9	7:35 p.m. PDT	Cardinals	L 4–5 (10)	Allen (1–2)	**Howell** (2–2)	Dayley (1)	3:34	37,775	15–14	L1
30	May 10	7:35 p.m. PDT	Pirates	**W** 1–0	**Reuss** (2–3)	Rhoden (2–4)	**Howe** (2)	2:28	48,681	16–14	W1
31	May 11	1:05 p.m. PDT	Pirates	L 2–5 (12)	Holland (1–1)	**Brennan** (1–3)	–	3:49	42,957	16–15	L1
32	May 12	1:05 p.m. PDT	Pirates	**W** 2–0	**Castillo** (1–1)	Tunnell (0–4)	**Niedenfuer** (2)	2:42	40,924	17–15	W1
33	May 14	7:35 p.m. PDT	Cubs	L 3–8	Sutcliffe (5–3)	**Valenzuela** (3–4)	–	3:03	48,187	17–16	L1
34	May 15	7:35 p.m. PDT	Cubs	L 2–3	Sanderson (2–1)	**Honeycutt** (2–3)	Smith (9)	3:04	46,213	17–17	L2
35	May 17	5:05 p.m. PDT	@ Phillies	L 5–10	Gross (3–4)	**Reuss** (2–4)	–	2:44	16,334	17–18	L3
36	May 18	4:05 p.m. PDT	@ Phillies	L 5–7	Andersen (1–2)	**Niedenfuer** (1–2)	Carman (1)	3:01	24,189	17–19	L4
37	May 19	10:35 a.m. PDT	@ Phillies	**W** 3–2	**Valenzuela** (4–4)	Hudson (1–3)	**Howell** (5)	2:16	35,276	18–19	W1
38	May 20	10:35 a.m. PDT	@ Expos	L 1–9	Schatzeder (1–0)	**Castillo** (1–1)	–	2:28	14,401	18–20	L1
39	May 21	4:35 p.m. PDT	@ Expos	L 1–6	Gullickson (5–4)	**Honeycutt** (2–4)	Reardon (9)	2:31	14,289	18–21	L2
40	May 22	4:35 p.m. PDT	@ Expos	**W** 4–0	**Reuss** (3–4)	Palmer (3–4)	–	2:22	19,239	19–21	W1
41	May 24	5:05 p.m. PDT	@ Mets	**W** 4–3	**Hershiser** (4–0)	Lynch (2–3)	**Niedenfuer** (3)	2:57	37,124	20–21	W2
42	May 25	10:20 a.m. PDT	@ Mets	**W** 6–2	**Valenzuela** (5–4)	Gooden (6–3)	–	2:35	40,052	21–21	W3
43	May 26	10:35 a.m. PDT	@ Mets	L 1–2	McDowell (5–1)	**Honeycutt** (2–5)	–	2:39	36,234	21–22	L1
44	May 27	4:35 p.m. PDT	@ Mets	L 1–8	Darling (4–1)	**Reuss** (3–5)	–	2:23	24,458	21–23	L2
45	May 29	7:35 p.m. PDT	Phillies	**W** 6–1	**Hershiser** (5–0)	Gross (3–6)	–	2:25	36,422	22–23	W1
46	May 30	7:35 p.m. PDT	Phillies	L 1–6	Denny (2–5)	**Valenzuela** (5–5)	–	2:29	29,591	22–24	L1
47	May 31	7:35 p.m. PDT	Expos	**W** 4–0	**Honeycutt** (3–5)	Gullickson (6–5)	**Niedenfuer** (4)	2:21	34,554	23–24	W1

June: 15–10 (Home: 9–6; Away: 6–4)

#	Date	Time (PT)	Opponent	Score	Win	Loss	Save	Time of Game	Attendance	Record	Box Streak
48	June 1	7:05 p.m. PDT	Expos	L 2–4 (11)	Lucas (1–0)	**Howell** (2–3)	Reardon (15)	3:14	41,058	23–25	L1
49	June 2	1:05 p.m. PDT	Expos	**W** 8–7	**Castillo** (2–1)	Smith (5–2)	–	3:15	37,660	24–25	W1
50	June 3	5:20 p.m. PDT	Mets	**W** 5–4 (12)	**Howe** (1–1)	Sisk (1–3)	–	3:54	36,935	25–25	W2
51	June 4	7:35 p.m. PDT	Mets	L 1–4	Gooden (8–3)	**Valenzuela** (5–6)	–	2:33	49,386	25–26	L1
52	June 5	7:35 p.m. PDT	Mets	**W** 2–1	**Welch** (1–0)	Fernandez (1–2)	**Howe** (3)	2:56	32,631	26–26	W1
53	June 7	4:40 p.m. PDT	@ Braves	**W** 7–2	**Niedenfuer** (3–3)	Bedrosian (2–5)	–	2:43	24,612	27–26	W2
54	June 8	12:20 p.m. PDT	@ Braves	L 3–7	Mahler (9–5)	**Hershiser** (5–1)	–	2:37	36,477	27–27	L1
55	June 9	11:10 a.m. PDT	@ Braves	L 3–10	Shields (1–0)	**Valenzuela** (5–7)	Forster (1)	2:55	29,340	27–28	L2
56	June 10	4:35 p.m. PDT	@ Reds	**W** 7–4	**Honeycutt** (4–5)	Stuper (5–5)	**Howell** (6)	2:40	18,064	28–28	W1
—	June 11		@ Reds	**Postponed (Rain)** (Makeup date: August 2)							
—	June 12		@ Reds	**Postponed (Rain)** (Makeup date: September 13)							
57	June 14	5:35 p.m. PDT	@ Astros	**W** 10–2	**Reuss** (4–5)	Niekro (3–7)	–	2:48	21,243	29–28	W2
58	June 15	10:20 a.m. PDT	@ Astros	**W** 3–0	**Hershiser** (6–1)	Knepper (6–3)	–	1:56	25,422	30–28	W3
59	June 16	4:05 p.m. PDT	@ Astros	**W** 9–0	**Valenzuela** (6–7)	Scott (5–3)	–	2:48	25,491	31–28	W4
60	June 17	5:20 p.m. PDT	Padres	L 2–3	Show (5–4)	**Honeycutt** (4–6)	Gossage (15)	2:57	30,633	31–29	L1
61	June 18	7:35 p.m. PDT	Padres	L 0–4	Dravecky (6–4)	**Welch** (1–1)	–	2:14	46,890	31–30	L2
62	June 19	7:35 p.m. PDT	Padres	**W** 5–1	**Reuss** (5–5)	Hawkins (11–1)	–	2:10	45,415	32–30	W1
63	June 21	7:35 p.m. PDT	Astros	**W** 7–2	**Hershiser** (7–1)	Scott (5–4)	–	2:41	39,584	33–30	W2
64	June 22	7:05 p.m. PDT	Astros	**W** 6–3	**Valenzuela** (7–7)	Ryan (8–4)	–	2:28	48,313	34–30	W3
65	June 23	1:05 p.m. PDT	Astros	**W** 6–2	**Honeycutt** (5–6)	Mathis (3–2)	**Niedenfuer** (5)	2:44	38,716	35–30	W4
66	June 24	5:20 p.m. PDT	Astros	L 4–8	Niekro (5–6)	**Reuss** (5–6)	–	2:42	34,459	35–31	L1
67	June 25	7:05 p.m. PDT	@ Padres	**W** 3–2	**Howell** (3–3)	Stoddard (0–3)	–	2:28	23,296	36–31	W1
68	June 26	7:05 p.m. PDT	@ Padres	L 4–10	Hoyt (10–4)	**Hershiser** (7–2)	–	2:07	36,113	36–32	L1
69	June 27	1:05 p.m. PDT	@ Padres	L 4–5	Lefferts (4–2)	**Valenzuela** (7–8)	Gossage (17)	2:33	47,482	36–33	L2
70	June 28	7:35 p.m. PDT	Braves	L 2–11	Bedrosian (5–6)	**Honeycutt** (5–7)	–	2:52	40,546	36–34	L3
71	June 29	12:50 p.m. PDT	Braves	**W** 3–2	**Reuss** (6–6)	Mahler (11–7)	**Niedenfuer** (6)	2:09	39,141	37–34	W1
72	June 30	1:05 p.m. PDT	Braves	**W** 4–3	**Howell** (4–3)	Sutter (4–3)	–	2:22	36,804	38–34	W2

July: 20–7 (Home: 12–4; Away: 8–3)

#	Date	Time (PT)	Opponent	Score	Win	Loss	Save	Time of Game	Attendance	Record	Box Streak
73	July 1	5:20 p.m. PDT	Reds	**W** 8–1	**Hershiser** (8–2)	Tibbs (4–10)	–	2:28	23,296	39–34	W3
74	July 2	7:35 p.m. PDT	Reds	**W** 3–0	**Valenzuela** (8–8)	Price (2–2)	–	2:06	49,207	40–34	W4
75	July 4	3:35 p.m. PDT	@ Cardinals	L 2–3	Andújar (14–3)	**Howell** (4–4)	—	3:05	38,394	40–35	L1
76	July 5	5:35 p.m. PDT	@ Cardinals	**W** 4–1	**Niedenfuer** (3–2)	Cox (9–4)	**Howell** (7)	2:22	39,296	41–35	W1
77	July 6	11:15 a.m. PDT	@ Cardinals	**W** 8–3	**Welch** (2–1)	Kepshire (5–6)	—	2:41	33,852	42–35	W2
78	July 7	11:15 a.m. PDT	@ Cardinals	L 1–7	Tudor (9–7)	**Hershiser** (8–3)	—	2:43	36,313	42–36	L1
79	July 8	4:35 p.m. PDT	@ Pirates	**W** 4–3	**Valenzuela** (9–8)	DeLeón (2–12)	–	2:46	6,537	43–36	W1
80	July 9	4:35 p.m. PDT	@ Pirates	**W** 8–3	**Honeycutt** (6–7)	Rhoden (5–9)	**Niedenfuer** (7)	2:41	6,748	44–36	W2
81	July 10	4:35 p.m. PDT	@ Pirates	**W** 5–4	**Reuss** (1–3)	Tunnell (0–6)	**Howell** (7)	2:34	12,934	45–36	W3
82	July 11	11:20 a.m. PDT	@ Cubs	**W** 3–1	**Welch** (3–1)	Fontenot (3–4)	**Howell** (8)	2:20	35,469	46–36	W4
83	July 12	1:05 p.m. PDT	@ Cubs	**W** 7–4	**Niedenfuer** (4–2)	Smith (4–4)	–	2:57	36,029	47–36	W5
84	July 13	10:20 a.m. PDT	@ Cubs	**W** 9–1	**Valenzuela** (10–8)	Gura (0–2)	–	2:32	34,822	48–36	W6
85	July 14	11:20 a.m. PDT	@ Cubs	L 4–10	Frazier (5–2)	**Honeycutt** (6–8)	Brusstar (2)	3:17	34,273	48–37	L1
—	July 16	5:30 p.m. PDT	56th All-Star Game	National League vs. American League (Hubert H. Humphrey Metrodome, Minneapolis, Minnesota)							
86	July 18	7:35 p.m. PDT	Cardinals	**W** 2–1	**Hershiser** (9–3)	Campbell (2–2)	**Niedenfuer** (8)	2:41	46,484	49–37	W1
87	July 19	7:35 p.m. PDT	Cardinals	**W** 5–2	**Welch** (4–1)	Cox (11–5)	—	2:15	49,472	50–37	L2
88	July 20	7:05 p.m. PDT	Cardinals	**W** 3–0	**Valenzuela** (11–8)	Tudor (10–8)	—	2:09	48,582	51–37	W3
89	July 21	1:05 p.m. PDT	Cardinals	L 2–4 (10)	Lahti (1–0)	**Niedenfuer** (4–3)	Forsch (2)	3:12	40,380	51–38	L1
90	July 22	7:35 p.m. PDT	Pirates	L 3–6	McWilliams (5–7)	**Honeycutt** (6–9)	Guante (1)	3:03	29,888	51–39	L2
91	July 23	7:35 p.m. PDT	Pirates	**W** 6–0	**Hershiser** (10–3)	Reuschel (8–3)	–	2:31	33,013	52–39	W1
92	July 24	7:35 p.m. PDT	Pirates	**W** 9–1	**Welch** (5–1)	Robinson (2–4)	–	2:42	34,051	53–39	W2
93	July 25	7:35 p.m. PDT	Cubs	**W** 7–3	**Valenzuela** (12–8)	Fontenot (3–5)	**Howell** (9)	2:33	49,516	54–39	W3
94	July 26	7:35 p.m. PDT	Cubs	**W** 10–0	**Reuss** (8–6)	Ruthven (4–7)	–	2:50	41,321	55–39	W4
95	July 27	12:20 p.m. PDT	Cubs	**W** 5–4	**Hershiser** (11–3)	Frazier (5–4)	**Howell** (10)	3:00	46,092	56–39	W5
96	July 28	1:05 p.m. PDT	Cubs	L 2–9	Sorensen (3–2)	**Powell** (0–1)	Brusstar (3)	2:44	47,571	56–40	L1
97	July 29	7:35 p.m. PDT	Giants	**W** 10–5	**Welch** (6–1)	Blue (5–4)	–	2:52	36,536	57–40	W1
98	July 30	7:35 p.m. PDT	Giants	**W** 4–2	**Niedenfuer** (5–3)	Minton (2–2)	–	2:54	46,668	58–40	W2
99	July 31	7:35 p.m. PDT	Giants	L 5–7	Laskey (5–11)	**Reuss** (8–7)	Garrelts (8)	2:48	45,297	58–41	L1

August: 16–11 (Home: 7–4; Away: 9–7)

#	Date	Time (PT)	Opponent	Score	Win	Loss	Save	Time of Game	Attendance	Record	Box Streak
100 (1)	August 2	2:05 p.m. PDT	@ Reds	**W** 5–3	**Hershiser** (12–3)	Robinson (5–3)	**Niedenfuer** (9)	2:38	–	59–41	W1
101 (2)	August 2	5:18 p.m. PDT	@ Reds	L 2–5	Tibbs (5–11)	**Honeycutt** (6–10)	–	2:25	40,236	59–42	L1
102	August 3	4:05 p.m. PDT	@ Reds	**W** 2–0	**Welch** (7–1)	Soto (10–12)	–	2:07	38,474	60–42	W1
103	August 4	11:15 a.m. PDT	@ Reds	L 4–5	Power (3–2)	**Howell** (4–5)	–	2:29	39,049	60–43	L1
104	August 5	4:40 p.m. PDT	@ Braves	**W** 6–1	**Reuss** (9–7)	Barker (1–5)	–	2:30	24,536	61–43	W1
—	August 6		@ Braves	**Postponed (Strike)** (Makeup date: September 10)							
—	August 7		@ Braves	**Postponed (Strike)** (Makeup date: September 9)							
105	August 8	7:35 p.m. PDT	Reds	L 5–6 (13)	Power (4–2)	**Diaz** (2–1)	Robinson (1)	4:14	37,479	61–44	L1
106	August 9	7:35 p.m. PDT	Reds	**W** 3–1	**Welch** (8–1)	Browning (9–9)	–	2:14	44,935	62–44	W1
107	August 10	7:35 p.m. PDT	Reds	**W** 2–1	**Valenzuela** (13–8)	Tibbs (5–12)	–	2:24	48,410	63–44	W2
108	August 11	1:05 p.m. PDT	Reds	**W** 4–0	**Reuss** (10–7)	McGaffigan (1–1)	–	2:31	41,188	64–44	W3
109	August 12	7:35 p.m. PDT	Braves	**W** 3–0	**Honeycutt** (7–10)	Mahler (16–10)	**Niedenfuer** (10)	2:19	36,741	65–44	W4
110	August 13	7:35 p.m. PDT	Braves	**W** 2–1	**Diaz** (3–1)	Forster (1–3)	**Niedenfuer** (11)	2:38	38,924	66–44	W5
111	August 14	7:35 p.m. PDT	Braves	**W** 5–0	**Welch** (9–1)	McMurtry (0–2)	–	2:11	39,627	67–44	W6
112	August 15	2:05 p.m. PDT	Braves	**W** 5–4	**Valenzuela** (14–8)	Sutter (7–5)	**Niedenfuer** (12)	2:32	42,169	68–44	W7
113	August 16	8:05 p.m. PDT	@ Giants	**W** 5–1	**Reuss** (11–7)	Blue (5–5)	**Howell** (11)	2:30	20,952	69–44	W8
114	August 17	1:05 p.m. PDT	@ Giants	L 2–5	Garrelts (7–3)	**Diaz** (3–2)	–	2:52	18,791	69–45	L1
115	August 18	1:05 p.m. PDT	@ Giants	L 1–2 (10)	Davis (4–7)	**Niedenfuer** (5–4)	–	2:48	29,181	69–46	L2
116	August 20	4:35 p.m. PDT	@ Phillies	**W** 5–4 (11)	**Niedenfuer** (6–4)	Tekulve (4–9)	**Honeycutt** (1)	3:39	24,227	70–46	W1
117	August 21	4:35 p.m. PDT	@ Phillies	**W** 15–6	**Valenzuela** (15–8)	Koosman (6–4)	–	2:56	23,650	71–46	W2
118	August 22	4:35 p.m. PDT	@ Phillies	L 0–2	Rawley (10–6)	**Reuss** (11–8)	–	2:20	22,598	71–47	L1
119	August 23	4:35 p.m. PDT	@ Expos	**W** 8–4	**Hershiser** (13–3)	Burke (8–2)	**Niedenfuer** (13)	2:48	21,124	72–47	W1
120	August 24	4:35 p.m. PDT	@ Expos	L 2–5	Smith (15–4)	**Honeycutt** (7–11)	Reardon (32)	2:41	24,372	72–48	L1
121	August 25	10:35 a.m. PDT	@ Expos	L 1–6	Gullickson (12–9)	**Welch** (9–2)	–	2:24	18,150	72–49	L2
122	August 26	4:35 p.m. PDT	@ Mets	**W** 6–1	**Valenzuela** (16–8)	Lynch (10–7)	–	2:47	43,063	73–49	W1
123	August 27	4:35 p.m. PDT	@ Mets	**W** 2–1	**Reuss** (12–8)	Fernandez (5–8)	**Niedenfuer** (14)	2:42	42,764	74–49	W2
124	August 29	7:35 p.m. PDT	Phillies	L 2–3 (10)	Carman (6–4)	**Honeycutt** (7–12)	–	3:35	39,487	74–50	L1
125	August 30	7:35 p.m. PDT	Phillies	L 2–5	Gross (13–9)	**Welch** (9–9)	Shipanoff (1)	2:40	49,068	74–51	L2
126	August 31	7:05 p.m. PDT	Phillies	L 0–5	Rawley (11–6)	**Valenzuela** (16–9)	–	2:20	46,942	74–52	L3

September: 18–12 (Home: 7–6; Away: 11–6)

#	Date	Time (PT)	Opponent	Score	Win	Loss	Save	Time of Game	Attendance	Record	Box Streak
127	September 1	1:05 p.m. PDT	Phillies	L 1–4	Denny (9–11)	**Reuss** (12–9)	Shipanoff (2)	2:42	29,029	74–53	L4
128	September 2	5:20 p.m. PDT	Expos	**W** 5–4 (11)	**Diaz** (4–2)	Reardon (2–7)	–	3:25	47,496	75–53	W1
129	September 3	7:35 p.m. PDT	Expos	**W** 4–0	**Hershiser** (14–3)	Smith (15–5)	–	2:19	27,292	76–53	W2
130	September 4	7:35 p.m. PDT	Expos	**W** 4–2	**Welch** (10–3)	Dopson (0–1)	**Niedenfuer** (15)	2:53	29,338	77–53	W3
131	September 6	7:35 p.m. PDT	Mets	L 0–2 (13)	Orosco (5–4)	**Niedenfuer** (6–5)	–	3:47	51,868	77–54	L1
132	September 7	12:20 p.m. PDT	Mets	**W** 7–6	**Niedenfuer** (7–5)	Leach (2–3)	–	3:11	44,444	78–54	W1
133	September 8	1:05 p.m. PDT	Mets	L 3–4 (14)	Sisk (4–5)	**Diaz** (4–3)	–	4:58	43,838	78–55	L1
134	September 9	4:40 p.m. PDT	@ Braves	**W** 9–7	**Holton** (1–0)	Sutter (7–7)	**Powell** (1)	3:46	3,137	79–55	W1
135 (1)	September 10	2:40 p.m. PDT	@ Braves	**W** 10–1	**Honeycutt** (8–12)	Pérez (1–10)	–	2:39	–	80–55	W2
136 (2)	September 10	5:54 p.m. PDT	@ Braves	**W** 10–4	**Powell** (1–1)	Smith (6–9)	–	3:00	10,300	81–55	W3
137	September 11	4:40 p.m. PDT	@ Braves	**W** 12–3	**Valenzuela** (17–9)	Bedrosian (6–12)	–	2:46	6,205	82–55	W4
138	September 12	4:40 p.m. PDT	@ Braves	L 6–11	Smith (7–9)	**Castillo** (2–2)	–	2:42	5,064	82–56	L1
139 (1)	September 13	2:05 p.m. PDT	@ Reds	**W** 8–2	**Hershiser** (15–3)	McGaffigan (1–3)	–	2:34	–	83–56	W1
140 (2)	September 13	5:14 p.m. PDT	@ Reds	L 5–6	Power (6–4)	**Niedenfuer** (7–6)	–	3:00	28,961	83–57	L1
141	September 14	4:05 p.m. PDT	@ Reds	**W** 7–0	**Welch** (11–3)	Robinson (5–6)	–	2:29	29,771	84–57	W1
142	September 15	11:15 a.m. PDT	@ Reds	L 6–10	Browning (17–9)	**Valenzuela** (17–10)	Power (22)	2:24	28,804	84–58	L1
143	September 16	7:05 p.m. PDT	@ Padres	L 2–4	Show (10–10)	**Reuss** (12–10)	Gossage (23)	2:20	25,035	84–59	L2
144	September 17	7:05 p.m. PDT	@ Padres	**W** 7–1	**Hershiser** (16–3)	Hawkins (17–7)	–	2:25	20,798	85–59	W1
145	September 18	7:35 p.m. PDT	Astros	L 2–7	Scott (18–7)	**Howell** (4–6)	Calhoun (4)	2:47	34,251	85–60	L1
146	September 19	7:35 p.m. PDT	Astros	L 5–6	Knepper (15–10)	**Welch** (11–4)	Smith (25)	3:11	25,466	85–61	L2
147	September 20	8:05 p.m. PDT	@ Giants	L 3–5	Minton (5–4)	**Niedenfuer** (7–7)	–	2:46	10,484	85–62	L3
148	September 21	1:05 p.m. PDT	@ Giants	**W** 11–2	**Reuss** (13–10)	Davis (5–11)	–	2:43	12,070	86–62	W1
149	September 22	1:05 p.m. PDT	@ Giants	**W** 5–3	**Hershiser** (17–3)	Blue (7–7)	**Niedenfuer** (16)	2:25	10,297	87–62	W2
150	September 23	5:35 p.m. PDT	@ Astros	**W** 5–3	**Diaz** (5–3)	Calhoun (2–4)	**Niedenfuer** (17)	2:50	8,938	88–62	W3
151	September 24	5:35 p.m. PDT	@ Astros	**W** 7–2	**Welch** (12–4)	Knepper (15–11)	–	2:44	10,043	89–62	W4
152	September 25	5:35 p.m. PDT	@ Astros	L 4–6 (10)	Solano (2–2)	**Niedenfuer** (7–8)	–	2:45	16,955	89–63	L1
153	September 27	7:35 p.m. PDT	Giants	**W** 6–2	**Hershiser** (18–3)	Blue (7–8)	–	2:36	35,400	90–63	W1
154	September 28	1:05 p.m. PDT	Giants	**W** 3–1	**Reuss** (14–10)	LaPoint (7–16)	**Niedenfuer** (18)	2:39	41,134	91–63	W2
155	September 29	1:05 p.m. PDT	Giants	**W** 7–2	**Welch** (13–4)	Mason (0–3)	–	2:58	45,775	92–63	W3
156	September 30	7:35 p.m. PDT	Padres	L 4–6	Gossage (4–3)	**Howell** (4–7)	–	2:37	37,571	92–64	L1

October: 3–3 (Home: 3–3; Away: 0–0)

#	Date	Time (PT)	Opponent	Score	Win	Loss	Save	Time of Game	Attendance	Record	Box Streak
157	October 1	7:35 p.m. PDT	Padres	**W** 10–3	**Diaz** (6–3)	Dravecky (13–11)	–	2:51	38,582	93–64	W1
158	October 2	7:35 p.m. PDT	Braves	**W** 9–3	**Hershiser** (19–3)	Johnson (4–4)	–	2:45	32,042	94–64	W2
159	October 3	7:35 p.m. PDT	Braves	L 0–5	Smith (9–10)	**Holton** (1–1)	–	2:32	23,486	94–65	L1
160	October 4	7:35 p.m. PDT	Reds	L 2–4	Stuper (8–5)	**Peña** (0–1)	Power (27)	2:18	43,309	94–66	L2
161	October 5	1:05 p.m. PDT	Reds	**W** 3–1	**Welch** (14–4)	Robinson (7–7)	**Niedenfuer** (19)	2:07	35,861	95–66	W1
162	October 6	1:05 p.m. PDT	Reds	L 5–6	Power (8–6)	**Niedenfuer** (7–9)	Franco (12)	2:47	45,778	95–67	L1

*An MLB Players strike forced the cancellation of all regular season games on August 6 and 7. Most games were made up later in the season.

=== Detailed records ===
**National League**
Opponent	Home	Away	Total	Pct.	Runs scored	Runs allowed
**NL East**
Chicago Cubs	3–3	4–2	7–5	.583	59	51
Montreal Expos	5–1	2–4	7–5	.583	44	47
New York Mets	3–3	4–2	7–5	.583	38	38
Philadelphia Phillies	1–5	3–3	4–8	.333	45	55
Pittsburgh Pirates	4–2	4–2	8–4	.667	50	46
St. Louis Cardinals	4–2	3–3	7–5	.583	39	35
	**20–16**	**20–16**	**40–32**	**.556**	**275**	**272**
**NL West**
Atlanta Braves	7–2	6–3	13–5	.722	99	65
Cincinnati Reds	6–3	5–4	11–7	.611	81	55
Houston Astros	5–4	7–2	12–6	.667	87	60
**Los Angeles Dodgers**	—	—	—	—	—	—
San Diego Padres	4–5	4–5	8–10	.444	64	62
San Francisco Giants	6–3	5–4	11–7	.611	76	55
	**28–17**	**27–18**	**55–35**	**.611**	**407**	**307**

==== Month-by-Month ====
Month	Games	Won	Lost	Win %	RS	RA
April	21	11	10	0.524	57	66
May	26	12	14	0.462	80	112
June	25	15	10	0.600	110	101
July	27	20	7	0.741	107	132
August	27	16	11	0.593	99	77
September	30	18	12	0.600	116	121
October	6	3	3	0.500	29	22
Total	162	95	67	0.586	682	579

	Games	Won	Lost	Win %	RS	RA
Home	81	48	33	0.593	310	258
Road	81	47	34	0.580	372	321
Total	162	95	67	0.586	682	579

=== Composite Box ===
1983 Los Angeles Dodgers Inning–by–Inning Boxscore
Team	1	2	3	4	5	6	7	8	9	10	11	12	13	14	R	H	E
Opponents	69	44	76	66	71	59	68	63	44	9	3	3	3	1	579	1280	0
Dodgers	75	69	65	77	94	93	88	69	43	4	4	2	0	0	682	1434	0

=== Postseason Game log ===
1985 Postseason Game Log: 2–4 (Home: 2–1; Away: 0–3)
NL Championship Series vs. St. Louis Cardinals 2–4 (Home: 2–1; Away: 0–3)

#	Date	Time (PT)	Opponent	Score	Win	Loss	Save	Time of Game	Attendance	Series	Box Streak
1	October 9	5:30 p.m. PDT	Cardinals	**W** 4–1	**Valenzuela** (1–0)	Tudor (0–1)	**Niedenfuer** (1)	2:42	55,270	LAN 1–0	W1
2	October 10	5:35 p.m. PDT	Cardinals	**W** 8–2	**Hershiser** (1–0)	Andújar (0–1)	—	3:04	52,222	LAN 2–0	W2
3	October 12	10:05 a.m. PDT	@ Cardinals	L 2–4	Cox (1–0)	**Welch** (0–1)	Dayley (1)	3:21	53,708	LAN 2–1	L1
4	October 13	5:15 p.m. PDT	@ Cardinals	L 2–12	Tudor (1–1)	**Reuss** (0–1)	—	2:47	53,708	TIE 2–2	L2
5	October 14	12:05 p.m. PDT	@ Cardinals	L 2–3	Lahti (1–0)	**Niedenfuer** (0–1)	—	2:56	53,708	STL 3–2	L3
6	October 16	12:05 p.m. PDT	Cardinals	L 5–7	Worrell (1–0)	**Niedenfuer** (0–2)	Dayley (2)	3:32	55,208	STL 4–2	L4

== Starting Lineups ==
=== Regular Season ===
==== Batting Order ====
1983 Regular Season Batting Order game log
April

#	Date	Opponent	1st	2nd	3rd	4th	5th	6th	7th	8th	9th
21	April 30	@ STL									

May

#	Date	Opponent	1st	2nd	3rd	4th	5th	6th	7th	8th	9th
22	May 1	@ STL									
28	May 8	STL									
29	May 9	STL									

June

#	Date	Opponent	1st	2nd	3rd	4th	5th	6th	7th	8th	9th

July

#	Date	Opponent	1st	2nd	3rd	4th	5th	6th	7th	8th	9th
75	July 4	@ STL									
76	July 5	@ STL									
77	July 6	@ STL									
78	July 7	@ STL									
86	July 18	STL									
87	July 19	STL									
88	July 20	STL									
89	July 21	STL									

August

#	Date	Opponent	1st	2nd	3rd	4th	5th	6th	7th	8th	9th

September

#	Date	Opponent	1st	2nd	3rd	4th	5th	6th	7th	8th	9th

October

#	Date	Opponent	1st	2nd	3rd	4th	5th	6th	7th	8th	9th

==== Defensive Lineup ====
1985 Regular Season Defensive Lineup game log
April

#	Date	Opponent	C	1B	2B	3B	SS	LF	CF	RF	P
21	April 30	@ STL									

May

#	Date	Opponent	C	1B	2B	3B	SS	LF	CF	RF	P
22	May 1	@ STL									
28	May 8	STL									
29	May 9	STL									

June

#	Date	Opponent	C	1B	2B	3B	SS	LF	CF	RF	P

July

#	Date	Opponent	C	1B	2B	3B	SS	LF	CF	RF	P
75	July 4	@ STL									
76	July 5	@ STL									
77	July 6	@ STL									
78	July 7	@ STL									
86	July 18	STL									
87	July 19	STL									
88	July 20	STL									
89	July 21	STL									

August

#	Date	Opponent	C	1B	2B	3B	SS	LF	CF	RF	P

September

#	Date	Opponent	C	1B	2B	3B	SS	LF	CF	RF	P

October

#	Date	Opponent	C	1B	2B	3B	SS	LF	CF	RF	P

=== Postseason ===
==== Batting Order ====
1985 Postseason Batting Order game log
NL Championship Series: vs. St. Louis Cardinals

#	Date	Opponent	1st	2nd	3rd	4th	5th	6th	7th	8th	9th
1	October 9	STL									
2	October 10	STL									
3	October 12	@ STL									
4	October 13	@ STL									
5	October 14	@ STL									
6	October 16	STL									

==== Defensive Lineup ====
1985 Postseason Defensive Lineup game log
NL Championship Series: vs. St. Louis Cardinals

#	Date	Opponent	C	1B	2B	3B	SS	LF	CF	RF	P
1	October 9	STL									
2	October 10	STL									
3	October 12	@ STL									
4	October 13	@ STL									
5	October 14	@ STL									
6	October 16	STL									

== Game Umpires ==
=== Regular Season ===
1985 Regular Season Umpire game log
April

#	Date	Opponent	HP	1B	2B	3B
21	April 30	@ STL	#10; John McSherry	#25; Charlie Williams	#30; Randy Marsh	#24; Bill Williams (crew chief)

May

#	Date	Opponent	HP	1B	2B	3B
22	May 1	@ STL	#25; Charlie Williams	#30; Randy Marsh	#24; Bill Williams (crew chief)	#10; John McSherry
28	May 8	STL	#12; Gerry Davis	#21; Harry Wendelstedt (crew chief)	#19; Terry Tata	#2; Jerry Crawford
29	May 9	STL	#21; Harry Wendelstedt (crew chief)	#19; Terry Tata	#2; Jerry Crawford	#12; Gerry Davis

June

#	Date	Opponent	HP	1B	2B	3B

July

#	Date	Opponent	HP	1B	2B	3B
75	July 4	@ STL	#17; Paul Runge	#5; Bob Engel (crew chief)	#27; Steve Rippley	#26; Dave Pallone
76	July 5	@ STL	#5; Bob Engel (crew chief)	#27; Steve Rippley	#26; Dave Pallone	#17; Paul Runge
77	July 6	@ STL	#27; Steve Rippley	#26; Dave Pallone	#17; Paul Runge	#5; Bob Engel (crew chief)
78	July 7	@ STL	#26; Dave Pallone	#17; Paul Runge	#5; Bob Engel (crew chief)	#27; Steve Rippley
86	July 18	STL	#26; Dave Pallone	#17; Paul Runge	#5; Bob Engel (crew chief)	#15; Jim Quick
87	July 19	STL	#17; Paul Runge	#5; Bob Engel (crew chief)	#15; Jim Quick	#26; Dave Pallone
88	July 20	STL	#5; Bob Engel (crew chief)	#15; Jim Quick	#26; Dave Pallone	#17; Paul Runge
89	July 21	STL	#15; Jim Quick	#26; Dave Pallone	#17; Paul Runge	#5; Bob Engel (crew chief)

August

#	Date	Opponent	HP	1B	2B	3B

September

#	Date	Opponent	HP	1B	2B	3B

October

#	Date	Opponent	HP	1B	2B	3B

=== Postseason ===
1985 Postseason Umpire game log
NL Championship Series: vs. St. Louis Cardinals

#	Date	Opponent	HP	1B	2B	3B	LF	RF
1	October 9	STL	#18; Dick Stello (crew chief)	#6; Bruce Froemming	#10; John McSherry	#19; Terry Tata	#17; Paul Runge	#2; Jerry Crawford
2	October 10	STL	#6; Bruce Froemming	#10; John McSherry	#19; Terry Tata	#2; Jerry Crawford	#18; Dick Stello (crew chief)	#17; Paul Runge
3	October 12	@ STL	#10; John McSherry	#19; Terry Tata	#17; Paul Runge	#2; Jerry Crawford	#18; Dick Stello (crew chief)	#6; Bruce Froemming
4	October 13	@ STL	#19; Terry Tata	#17; Paul Runge	#2; Jerry Crawford	#18; Dick Stello (crew chief)	#6; Bruce Froemming	#10; John McSherry
5	October 14	@ STL	#17; Paul Runge	#2; Jerry Crawford	#18; Dick Stello (crew chief)	#6; Bruce Froemming	#10; John McSherry	#19; Terry Tata
6	October 16	STL	#2; Jerry Crawford	#18; Dick Stello (crew chief)	#6; Bruce Froemming	#10; John McSherry	#19; Terry Tata	#17; Paul Runge

== Player stats ==
=== Batting ===
==== Starters by position ====
Note: Pos = Position; G = Games played; AB = At bats; H = Hits; Avg. = Batting average; HR = Home runs; RBI = Runs batted in

Pos	Player	G	AB	H	Avg.	HR	RBI
C	Mike Scioscia	141	429	127	.296	7	53
1B	Greg Brock	129	438	110	.251	21	66
2B	Steve Sax	136	488	136	.279	1	42
SS	Mariano Duncan	142	562	137	.244	6	39
3B	Dave Anderson	77	221	44	.199	4	18
LF	Pedro Guerrero	137	487	156	.320	33	87
CF	Ken Landreaux	147	482	129	.268	12	50
RF	Mike Marshall	135	518	152	.293	28	95

==== Other batters ====
Note: G = Games played; AB = At bats; H = Hits; Avg. = Batting average; HR = Home runs; RBI = Runs batted in

Player	G	AB	H	Avg.	HR	RBI
Candy Maldonado	121	213	48	.225	5	19
R.J. Reynolds	73	207	55	.266	0	25
Enos Cabell	57	192	56	.292	0	22
Bill Russell	76	169	44	.260	0	13
Steve Yeager	53	121	25	.207	0	9
Bob Bailor	74	118	29	.246	0	7
Terry Whitfield	79	104	27	.260	3	16
Al Oliver	35	79	20	.253	0	8
Len Matuszek	43	63	14	.222	3	13
Sid Bream	24	53	7	.132	3	6
Mike Ramsey	9	15	2	.133	0	0
Jay Johnstone	17	15	2	.133	0	2
José González	23	11	3	.273	0	0
Reggie Williams	22	9	3	.333	0	0
Franklin Stubbs	10	9	2	.222	0	2
Ralph Bryant	6	6	2	.333	0	1
Stu Pederson	8	4	0	.000	0	1
Gilberto Reyes	6	1	0	.000	0	0

=== Pitching ===
==== Starting pitchers ====
Note: G = Games pitched; IP = Innings pitched; W = Wins; L = Losses; ERA = Earned run average; SO = Strikeouts

Player	G	IP	W	L	ERA	SO
Fernando Valenzuela	35	272.1	17	10	2.45	208
Orel Hershiser	36	239.2	19	3	2.03	157
Jerry Reuss	34	212.2	14	10	2.92	84
Bob Welch	23	167.1	14	4	2.31	96

==== Other pitchers ====
Note: G = Games pitched; IP = Innings pitched; W = Wins; L = Losses; ERA = Earned run average; SO = Strikeouts

Player	G	IP	W	L	ERA	SO
Rick Honeycutt	31	142.0	8	12	3.42	67
Bobby Castillo	35	68.0	2	2	5.43	57
Tom Brennan	12	31.2	1	3	7.39	17
Dennis Powell	16	29.1	1	1	5.22	19
Alejandro Peña	2	4.1	0	1	8.31	2

==== Relief pitchers ====
Note: G = Games pitched; W = Wins; L = Losses; SV = Saves; ERA = Earned run average; SO = Strikeouts

Player	G	W	L	SV	ERA	SO
Tom Niedenfuer	64	7	9	19	2.71	102
Ken Howell	56	4	7	12	3.77	85
Carlos Diaz	46	6	3	0	2.61	73
Steve Howe	19	1	1	3	4.91	11
Brian Holton	3	1	1	0	9.00	1

== National League Championship Series ==
The Dodgers faced the St. Louis Cardinals in the 1985 NLCS, the first year the championship series was in a "Best of seven" format. Jack Clark hit a 450-foot home run off Dodger closer Tom Niedenfuer to win game six and the NLCS for the Cardinals. With an open base, Dodger manager Tommy Lasorda was second guessed for not walking Clark, the only big power threat in the Cardinal line-up. Niedenfuer also gave up a walk-off home run to Ozzie Smith in game five contributing to Smith winning the NLCS MVP Award.

=== Game 1 ===
Wednesday, October 9 at Dodger Stadium (Los Angeles)

Team	1	2	3	4	5	6	7	8	9	R	H	E
St. Louis	0	0	0	0	0	0	1	0	0	1	8	1
Los Angeles	0	0	0	1	0	3	0	0	X	4	8	0
W: Fernando Valenzuela (1-0) L: John Tudor (0-1) SV: Tom Niedenfuer (1)
HRs: LAD – None STL – None

=== Game 2 ===
Thursday, October 10 at Dodger Stadium (Los Angeles)

Team	1	2	3	4	5	6	7	8	9	R	H	E
St. Louis	0	0	1	0	0	0	0	0	1	2	8	1
Los Angeles	0	0	3	2	1	2	0	0	X	8	13	1
W: Orel Hershiser (1-0) L: Joaquín Andújar (0-1) SV: None
HRs: LAD – Greg Brock (1) STL – None

=== Game 3 ===
Saturday, October 12 at Busch Stadium (St. Louis)

Team	1	2	3	4	5	6	7	8	9	R	H	E
Los Angeles	0	0	0	1	0	0	1	0	0	2	7	2
St. Louis	2	2	0	0	0	0	0	0	X	4	8	0
W: Danny Cox (1-0) L: Bob Welch (0-1) SV: Ken Dayley (1)
HRs: LAD – None STL – Tom Herr (1)

=== Game 4 ===
Sunday, October 13 at Busch Stadium (St. Louis)

Team	1	2	3	4	5	6	7	8	9	R	H	E
Los Angeles	0	0	0	0	0	0	1	1	0	2	5	1
St. Louis	0	9	0	1	1	0	0	1	X	12	15	0
W: John Tudor (1-0) L: Jerry Reuss (0-1) SV: None
HRs: LAD – Bill Madlock (1) STL – None

=== Game 5 ===
Monday, October 14 at Busch Stadium (St. Louis)

Team	1	2	3	4	5	6	7	8	9	R	H	E
Los Angeles	0	0	0	2	0	0	0	0	0	2	5	1
St. Louis	2	0	0	0	0	0	0	0	1	3	5	1
W: Jeff Lahti (1-0) L: Tom Niedenfuer (0-1) SV: None
HRs: LAD – Bill Madlock (2) STL – Ozzie Smith (1)

=== Game 6 ===
Wednesday, October 16 at Dodger Stadium (Los Angeles)

Team	1	2	3	4	5	6	7	8	9	R	H	E
St. Louis	0	0	1	0	0	0	3	0	3	7	12	1
Los Angeles	1	1	0	0	2	0	0	1	0	5	8	0
W: Todd Worrell (1-0) L: Tom Niedenfuer (0-2) SV: Ken Dayley (2)
HRs: LAD – Bill Madlock (3) Mike Marshall (1) STL – Jack Clark (1)

== 1985 awards ==
- 1985 Major League Baseball All-Star Game
  - Pedro Guerrero reserve
  - Fernando Valenzuela reserve
- NL Pitcher of the Month
  - Fernando Valenzuela (April 1985)
  - Fernando Valenzuela (July 1985)
- NL Player of the Month
  - Pedro Guerrero (June 1985)
- NL Player of the Week
  - Pedro Guerrero (June 10–16)
  - Pedro Guerrero (July 22–28)
  - Mike Marshall (Sep. 9–15)

== Farm system ==
Level	Team	League	Manager
AAA	Albuquerque Dukes	Pacific Coast League	Terry Collins
AA	San Antonio Dodgers	Texas League	Gary LaRocque
High A	Bakersfield Dodgers	California League	Mel Queen
High A	Vero Beach Dodgers	Florida State League	Stan Wasiak
Rookie	Great Falls Dodgers	Pioneer League	Kevin Kennedy
Rookie	Gulf Coast Dodgers	Gulf Coast League	Joe Alvarez

== Major League Baseball draft ==
The Dodgers drafted 37 players in the June draft and 16 in the January draft. Of those, six players would eventually play in the Major Leagues. They received an extra pick in the 2nd round of the June draft as compensation for losing pitcher Burt Hooton as a free agent.

The first pick in the June draft was outfielder Chris Gwynn from San Diego State. The brother of Hall of Famer Tony Gwynn, he would play 10 seasons in the Majors (7 of them with the Dodgers), primarily as a pinch hitter/backup outfielder. He hit .261 in 599 Major League games. The draft also included outfielder Mike Devereaux (round 5), who was briefly a starter with the Baltimore Orioles in the early 90s but was primarily a reserve, and relief pitcher John Wetteland (2nd round of the January secondary draft) who saved 330 games in 12 seasons (with the Dodgers, Expos, Yankees and Rangers).

1985 Draft Picks

=== January draft ===
Round	Name	Position	School	Signed	Career span	Highest level
1	Bradley Zeinert	LHP		Yes	1985–1987	Rookie
2	John Farley	3B	San Jacinto College	Yes	1985	Rookie
3	Greg Briley	SS	Louisburg College	No; Mariners-1986	1986–1997	MLB
4	Mike Kitz	LHP	College of San Mateo	No		
5	Paul Kuzniar	RHP	Alvin Community College	No; Indians-1987	1987–1990	AA
6	Lester Logan	C	University of Nebraska at Lincoln	No		
7	Gregory Martin	2B	Middle Georgia College	No		
8	Mike Fowler	3B	Spartanburg Methodist College	No; Braves-1987	1987–1989	A
9	Bruce Powers	OF	Skyline Junior College	No		
10	Chris Graves	RHP	Middle Georgia College	No		
11	Kevin Nelson	RHP	Yuba Community College	Yes	1985–1986	A
12	Derek Keathley	RHP	Yuba Community College	No		
13	John McEntee	LHP	College of Marin	No		

==== January secondary phase ====
Round	Name	Position	School	Signed	Career span	Highest level
1	Eric Tutt	1B	Middle Georgia College	No	1985	Rookie
2	John Wetteland	RHP	College of San Mateo	Yes	1985–2000	MLB
3	Adrian Adkins	C	Middle Georgia College	No; Pirates-1989	1989	Rookie

=== June draft ===
Round	Name	Position	School	Signed	Career span	Highest level
1	Chris Gwynn	OF	San Diego State University	Yes	1985–1996	MLB
2	Mike Watters	2B	University of Michigan	Yes	1985–1988	AAA
2	Jeremy Smith	C	Morehead State University	Yes	1985–1986	A
3	Pete Geist	OF	Georgia Institute of Technology	Yes	1985–1987	A
4	Mike Prior	OF	Illinois State University	No		
5	Mike Devereaux	OF	Arizona State University	Yes	1985–1998	MLB
6	Walter McConnell	3B	Georgia Institute of Technology	Yes	1985–1992	AAA
7	Rene Garcia	LHP	Hoover High School	Yes	1985–1987	A
8	Jack Savage	RHP	University of Kentucky	Yes	1985–1991	MLB
9	Walter Stull	RHP	University of California, Riverside	Yes	1985–1987	A
10	Frederick Farwell	LHP	University of Arkansas	Yes	1985–1988	AAA
11	Michael Fiala	RHP	Princeton University	Yes	1985–1986	A
12	Kenneth Lambert	C	University of Portland	Yes	1985–1987	A
13	Andy Naworski	RHP	University of California, Los Angeles	Yes	1985–1987	A
14	Michael Batesole	3B	Oral Roberts University	Yes	1985–1988	AA
15	William Ray	RHP	University of Kentucky	Yes	1985–1988	A
16	Mike Huff	OF	Northwestern University	Yes	1985–1996	MLB
17	Bryan Smith	LHP	St. Mary's College of California	Yes	1985–1987	A
18	Carl Thomas	LHP	Calhoun County High School	Yes	1985–1987	A
19	Michael Burke	1B	St. Xavier University	Yes	1985–1987	A
20	Michael Lilly	RHP	State University of West Georgia	Yes	1985–1987	Rookie
21	Charles Hardwick	LHP	University of South Carolina	Yes	1985–1986	A
22	Edwin Hart	LHP	Patrick Henry High School	Yes	1985–1986	Rookie
23	Jeffrey Hartman	SS	McCaskey High School	Yes	1985–1988	A
24	Michael White	OF	Valdosta State University	Yes	1985–1986	A
25	Paul Moralez	1B	University of California, Riverside	Yes	1985–1987	A
26	Douglas Ames	LHP		Yes	1985–1986	A
27	Robert Tucker	C	West Virginia University	Yes	1985–1986	A
28	Eugene Ayers	SS	University of North Carolina at Charlotte	Yes	1985–1986	A
29	Brett Parker	SS	Sul Ross State University	Yes	1985	Rookie
30	Andrew Anthony	OF	Valdosta State University	Yes	1985–1986	A
31	Jim Garrison	SS	Plant City High School	Yes	1985–1988	A
32	Ronald Jackson	C	Huston-Tillotson College	Yes	1985–1986	A
33	Bill Bluhm	3B	College of the Canyons	Yes	1985–1989	A

==== June secondary phase ====
Round	Name	Position	School	Signed	Career span	Highest level
1	Doug Cox	LHP	Georgia Perimeter College	No		
2	Marty Newton	C	San Bernardino Valley College	Yes	1985–1986	A-
3	John McEntee	LHP	College of Marin	No		
