= 1985 Pittsburgh Pirates season =

1985 Pittsburgh Pirates
- League: National League
- Division: East
- Ballpark: Three Rivers Stadium
- City: Pittsburgh, Pennsylvania
- Record: 57–104 (.354)
- Divisional place: 6th
- Owners: John W. Galbreath; Warner Communications
- General managers: Harding "Pete" Peterson; Joe L. Brown
- Managers: Chuck Tanner
- Television: KDKA-TV (Steve Blass, Lanny Frattare, Jim Rooker, John Sanders)
- Radio: KDKA-AM (Lanny Frattare, Bob Prince (select games until death on June 10), Jim Rooker)

The 1985 Pittsburgh Pirates season was the 104th season of the franchise; the 99th in the National League. This was their 16th season at Three Rivers Stadium. The Pirates finished sixth and last in the National League East with a record of 57–104, 43½ games behind the NL Champion St. Louis Cardinals.

== Offseason ==
The team was beset during the offseason with the triple threat of its longtime owner taking bids for the debt laden franchise, rumors of a possible relocation to cities such as Tampa, Denver and New Orleans and the expanding Pittsburgh drug trials.

Off season transactions included:

- December 12, 1984: Brian Harper and John Tudor were traded by the Pirates to the St. Louis Cardinals for George Hendrick and Steve Barnard (minors).
- December 20, 1984: Jay Buhner, Dale Berra and Alfonso Pulido were traded by the Pirates to the New York Yankees for Steve Kemp, Tim Foli, and cash.
- January 22, 1985: Sixto Lezcano was signed as a free agent with the Pittsburgh Pirates.
- February 28, 1985: Rick Reuschel was signed as a free agent by the Pirates.
- March 1, 1985: Scott Loucks was signed as a free agent by the Pirates.

== Regular season ==
=== Season standings ===
NL East
Team	W	L	Pct.	GB	Home	Road
St. Louis Cardinals	101	61	.623	—	54‍–‍27	47‍–‍34
New York Mets	98	64	.605	3	51‍–‍30	47‍–‍34
Montreal Expos	84	77	.522	16½	44‍–‍37	40‍–‍40
Chicago Cubs	77	84	.478	23½	41‍–‍39	36‍–‍45
Philadelphia Phillies	75	87	.463	26	41‍–‍40	34‍–‍47
Pittsburgh Pirates	57	104	.354	43½	35‍–‍45	22‍–‍59

=== Record vs. opponents ===
1985 National League record Sources:
Team	ATL	CHC	CIN	HOU	LAD	MON	NYM	PHI	PIT	SD	SF	STL
Atlanta	—	5–7	7–11	8–10	5–13	3–9	2–10	10–2	6–6	7–11	10–8	3–9
Chicago	7–5	—	5–6	5–7	5–7	7–11	4–14	13–5	13–5	8–4	6–6	4–14
Cincinnati	11–7	6–5	—	11–7	7–11	8–4	4–8	7–5	9–3	9–9	12–6	5–7
Houston	10–8	7–5	7–11	—	6–12	6–6	4–8	4–8	6–6	12–6	15–3	6–6
Los Angeles	13–5	7–5	11–7	12–6	—	7–5	7–5	4–8	8–4	8–10	11–7	7–5
Montreal	9–3	11–7	4–8	6–6	5–7	—	9–9	8–10	9–8	5–7	7–5	11–7
New York	10–2	14–4	8–4	8–4	5–7	9–9	—	11–7	10–8	7–5	8–4	8–10
Philadelphia	2-10	5–13	5–7	8–4	8–4	10–8	7–11	—	11–7	5–7	6–6	8–10
Pittsburgh	6–6	5–13	3–9	6–6	4–8	8–9	8–10	7–11	—	4–8	3–9	3–15
San Diego	11–7	4–8	9–9	6–12	10–8	7–5	5–7	7–5	8–4	—	12–6	4–8
San Francisco	8–10	6–6	6–12	3–15	7–11	5–7	4–8	6–6	9–3	6–12	—	2–10
St. Louis	9–3	14–4	7–5	6–6	5–7	7–11	10–8	10–8	15–3	8–4	10–2	—

=== Game log ===
1985 Game Log: 57–104 (Home: 35–45; Away: 22–59)
April: 6–12 (Home: 5–5; Away: 1–7)

#	Date	Opponent	Score	Win	Loss	Save	Attendance	Record
1	April 9	@ Cubs	1–2	Sutcliffe	**Rhoden** (0–1)	Smith	34,551	0–1
2	April 11	@ Cubs	1–4	Trout	**DeLeon** (0–1)	—	10,049	0–2
3	April 12	Cardinals	6–4	**Robinson** (1–0)	Kepshire	**Candelaria** (1)	47,335	1–2
4	April 13	Cardinals	4–3	**Candelaria** (1–0)	Campbell	—	9,171	2–2
5	April 14	Cardinals	4–10	Andujar	**Rhoden** (0–2)	—	12,483	2–3
6	April 15	Mets	4–1	**Bielecki** (1–0)	Latham	**Candelaria** (2)	5,575	3–3
7	April 16	Mets	1–2	Orosco	**Candelaria** (1–1)	—	5,879	3–4
8	April 17	Mets	6–10	Sisk	**McWilliams** (0–1)	—	14,029	3–5
9	April 19	@ Cardinals	4–5	Andujar	**Candelaria** (1–2)	Allen	30,510	3–6
10	April 20	@ Cardinals	3–4	Cox	**Tunnell** (0–1)	Allen	32,978	3–7
11	April 21	@ Cardinals	0–6	Forsch	**DeLeon** (0–2)	—	28,880	3–8
12	April 22	Cubs	5–3	**McWilliams** (1–1)	Ruthven	**Candelaria** (3)	6,329	4–8
13	April 23	Cubs	0–5	Sutcliffe	**Bielecki** (1–1)	—	9,387	4–9
14	April 24	Cubs	2–5	Trout	**Rhoden** (0–3)	Smith	3,981	4–10
15	April 26	@ Mets	0–6	Darling	**DeLeon** (0–3)	—	31,846	4–11
16	April 27	@ Mets	3–2	**McWilliams** (2–1)	Orosco	**Candelaria** (4)	24,786	5–11
17	April 28	@ Mets	4–5 (18)	Gorman	**Tunnell** (0–2)	—	36,423	5–12
18	April 30	Padres	6–2	**Rhoden** (1–3)	Hoyt	**Holland** (1)	6,166	6–12

May: 9–17 (Home: 4–9; Away: 5–8)

#	Date	Opponent	Score	Win	Loss	Save	Attendance	Record
19	May 1	Padres	4–6	Show	**DeLeon** (0–4)	Gossage	3,845	6–13
20	May 3	Dodgers	16–2	**McWilliams** (3–1)	Honeycutt	—	17,628	7–13
21	May 4	Dodgers	5–6 (10)	Valenzuela	**Candelaria** (1–3)	—	14,093	7–14
22	May 5	Dodgers	3–2	**Rhoden** (2–3)	Niedenfuer	**Candelaria** (5)	17,043	8–14
23	May 6	Giants	5–7	Laskey	**DeLeon** (0–5)	Garrelts	4,533	8–15
24	May 7	Giants	3–5	Gott	**Tunnell** (0–3)	Garrelts	4,587	8–16
25	May 8	@ Padres	2–12	Hawkins	**McWilliams** (3–2)	—	22,092	8–17
26	May 9	@ Padres	0–1	Thurmond	**Bielecki** (1–2)	—	24,882	8–18
27	May 10	@ Dodgers	0–1	Reuss	**Rhoden** (2–4)	Howe	48,681	8–19
28	May 11	@ Dodgers	5–2 (12)	**Holland** (1–0)	Brennan	—	42,957	9–19
29	May 12	@ Dodgers	0–2	Castillo	**Tunnell** (0–4)	Niedenfuer	40,924	9–20
30	May 14	@ Giants	1–3	Krukow	**McWilliams** (3–3)	—	4,484	9–21
31	May 15	@ Giants	3–2	**Robinson** (2–0)	Garrelts	—	6,852	10–21
32	May 17	Reds	3–6	Stuper	**DeLeon** (0–6)	Power	7,239	10–22
33	May 18	Reds	0–8	Browning	**Bielecki** (1–3)	—	9,708	10–23
34	May 19	Reds	1–7	Soto	**Tunnell** (0–5)	—	11,990	10–24
35	May 20	Astros	3–1	**Rhoden** (3–4)	Niekro	**Holland** (2)	4,768	11–24
36	May 21	Astros	3–2	**Reuschel** (1–0)	Scott	**Candelaria** (6)	5,146	12–24
37	May 22	Astros	3–5 (10)	Dawley	**Holland** (1–1)	Smith	10,681	12–25
38	May 24	@ Braves	4–2	**Winn** (1–0)	Bedrosian	**Candelaria** (7)	18,490	13–25
39	May 25	@ Braves	8–2	**Rhoden** (4–4)	Perez	—	31,177	14–25
40	May 26	@ Braves	4–5 (10)	Dedmon	**Krawczyk** (0–1)	—	21,723	14–26
41	May 27	@ Astros	2–4	Knepper	**DeLeon** (0–7)	Smith	9,692	14–27
42	May 28	@ Astros	4–3 (12)	**Guante** (1–0)	Solano	—	8,686	15–27
43	May 29	@ Astros	3–8	Ryan	**Krawczyk** (0–2)	—	10,133	15–28
44	May 31	Braves	2–8	Camp	**Rhoden** (4–5)	—	7,822	15–29

June: 9–18 (Home: 6–8; Away: 3–10)

#	Date	Opponent	Score	Win	Loss	Save	Attendance	Record
45	June 1	Braves	6–3	**Reuschel** (2–0)	Garber	**Scurry** (1)	14,579	16–29
46	June 2	Braves	5–0	**DeLeon** (1–7)	Bedrosian	**Holland** (3)	15,034	17–29
47	June 4	@ Reds	3–9	Soto	**Guante** (1–1)	—	13,222	17–30
48	June 5	@ Reds	9–11	Pastore	**Robinson** (2–1)	Franco	12,540	17–31
49	June 6	@ Cubs	2–3 (12)	Brusstar	**Holland** (1–2)	—	22,368	17–32
50	June 7	@ Cubs	0–1	Sutcliffe	**DeLeon** (1–8)	—	37,414	17–33
51	June 8	@ Cubs	3–7	Trout	**McWilliams** (3–4)	—	35,232	17–34
52	June 9	@ Cubs	1–5	Ruthven	**Winn** (1–1)	Brusstar	36,475	17–35
53	June 10	Cardinals	1–6	Cox	**Rhoden** (4–6)	—	5,557	17–36
54	June 11	Cardinals	13–2	**Reuschel** (3–0)	Allen	—	4,817	18–36
55	June 13	Cardinals	1–2	Tudor	**McWilliams** (3–5)	Lahti	4,833	18–37
56	June 14	Phillies	3–2	**DeLeon** (2–8)	Carman	**Robinson** (1)	10,211	19–37
57	June 15	Phillies	3–13	Denny	**Rhoden** (4–7)	—	10,897	19–38
58	June 16	Phillies	2–3	Hudson	**Reuschel** (3–1)	Tekulve	14,451	19–39
59	June 17	@ Expos	5–2	**Winn** (2–1)	Palmer	**Robinson** (2)	18,634	20–39
60	June 18	@ Expos	4–1	**McWilliams** (4–5)	Smith	—	24,318	21–39
61	June 19	@ Expos	3–4	Burke	**DeLeon** (2–9)	Reardon	10,204	21–40
62	June 20	@ Expos	2–1	**Rhoden** (5–7)	Schatzeder	**Holland** (4)	15,157	22–40
63	June 21	@ Phillies	3–4 (16)	Andersen	**Winn** (2–2)	—	22,493	22–41
64	June 22	@ Phillies	2–5	Carman	**Robinson** (2–2)	—	23,623	22–42
65	June 23	@ Phillies	2–3	Carman	**Winn** (2–3)	—	29,082	22–43
66	June 25	Expos	2–3	Burke	**Holland** (1–3)	Reardon	6,874	22–44
67	June 26	Expos	11–2	**Reuschel** (4–1)	O'Connor	—	16,770	23–44
68	June 27	Expos	2–4	Palmer	**McWilliams** (4–6)	Reardon	9,517	23–45
69	June 28	Cubs	0–5	Trout	**DeLeon** (2–10)	—	16,432	23–46
70	June 29	Cubs	6–5 (15)	**Reuschel** (5–1)	Frazier	—	13,934	24–46
71	June 30	Cubs	2–9	Sanderson	**Robinson** (2–3)	—	31,384	24–47

July: 8–19 (Home: 5–8; Away: 3–11)

#	Date	Opponent	Score	Win	Loss	Save	Attendance	Record
72	July 1	@ Mets	1–0	**Reuschel** (6–1)	Fernandez	**Candelaria** (8)	21,610	25–47
73	July 2	@ Mets	4–5	Darling	**McWilliams** (4–7)	McDowell	22,651	25–48
74	July 3	@ Mets	2–6	Lynch	**DeLeon** (2–11)	—	46,220	25–49
75	July 4	Padres	1–9	Show	**Rhoden** (5–8)	—	10,102	25–50
76	July 5	Padres	5–4 (12)	**Reuschel** (7–1)	Lefferts	—	8,986	26–50
77	July 6	Padres	8–7	**Candelaria** (2–3)	Lefferts	—	10,281	27–50
78	July 7	Padres	0–3	Hoyt	**Reuschel** (7–2)	—	11,608	27–51
79	July 8	Dodgers	3–4	Valenzuela	**DeLeon** (2–12)	—	6,537	27–52
80	July 9	Dodgers	3–8	Honeycutt	**Rhoden** (5–9)	Niedenfuer	6,748	27–53
81	July 10	Dodgers	4–5	Reuss	**Tunnell** (0–6)	Howell	12,934	27–54
82	July 11	Giants	6–4	**Guante** (2–1)	Krukow	—	5,188	28–54
83	July 12	Giants	3–1	**Reuschel** (8–2)	Gott	**Candelaria** (9)	7,915	29–54
84	July 13	Giants	1–4	LaPoint	**DeLeon** (2–13)	—	10,050	29–55
85	July 14	Giants	3–7	Laskey	**Rhoden** (5–10)	Davis	18,313	29–56
86	July 18	@ Padres	2–3	Lefferts	**Candelaria** (2–4)	Gossage	20,740	29–57
87	July 19	@ Padres	0–6	Hawkins	**DeLeon** (2–14)	—	30,386	29–58
88	July 20	@ Padres	2–4	Hoyt	**Rhoden** (5–11)	Gossage	36,340	29–59
89	July 21	@ Padres	5–2	**Tunnell** (1–6)	Show	—	23,481	30–59
90	July 22	@ Dodgers	6–3	**McWilliams** (5–7)	Honeycutt	**Guante** (1)	29,888	31–59
91	July 23	@ Dodgers	0–6	Hershiser	**Reuschel** (8–3)	—	33,013	31–60
92	July 24	@ Dodgers	1–9	Welch	**Robinson** (2–4)	—	34,051	31–61
93	July 25	@ Giants	3–4	Minton	**Guante** (2–2)	—	3,821	31–62
94	July 26	@ Giants	1–3	Laskey	**Tunnell** (1–7)	Garrelts	5,305	31–63
95	July 27	@ Giants	3–8	LaPoint	**Robinson** (2–5)	Minton	8,271	31–64
96	July 28	@ Giants	2–3 (10)	Garrelts	**Guante** (2–3)	—	10,976	31–65
97	July 30	Phillies	0–2	Gross	**Rhoden** (5–12)	Tekulve	7,496	31–66
98	July 31	Phillies	4–3 (10)	**Guante** (3–3)	Tekulve	—	6,797	32–66

August: 8–20 (Home: 7–7; Away: 1–13)

#	Date	Opponent	Score	Win	Loss	Save	Attendance	Record
99	August 1	Phillies	0–3	Denny	**Robinson** (2–6)	—	6,199	32–67
100	August 2	Expos	2–3	Hesketh	**Reuschel** (8–4)	Reardon	6,705	32–68
101	August 3	Expos	5–6	Roberge	**McWilliams** (5–8)	Reardon	10,593	32–69
102	August 4	Expos	4–3	**Rhoden** (6–12)	Gullickson	**Guante** (2)	10,981	33–69
103	August 5	Expos	2–5	Burke	**Winn** (2–4)	Reardon	7,838	33–70
104	August 8	@ Phillies	3–7	Denny	**Robinson** (2–7)	Carman	18,142	33–71
105	August 9	@ Expos	2–7	Smith	**Reuschel** (8–5)	Reardon	18,165	33–72
106	August 10	@ Expos	5–7	St. Claire	**Rhoden** (6–13)	Roberge	19,982	33–73
107	August 11	@ Expos	5–6	Burke	**Guante** (3–4)	—	21,741	33–74
108	August 12	@ Cardinals	1–8	Tudor	**Winn** (2–5)	—	24,516	33–75
109	August 13	@ Cardinals	5–6	Andujar	**Robinson** (2–8)	Dayley	30,469	33–76
110	August 15	@ Cardinals	1–3	Kepshire	**Reuschel** (8–6)	Dayley		33–77
111	August 15	@ Cardinals	3–4 (12)	Campbell	**Guante** (3–5)	—	34,170	33–78
112	August 16	Mets	7–1	**Rhoden** (7–13)	Lynch	—	9,289	34–78
113	August 17	Mets	3–4	Fernandez	**Tunnell** (1–8)	McDowell	10,200	34–79
114	August 18	Mets	5–0	**Robinson** (3–8)	Aguilera	**Clements** (1)	14,508	35–79
115	August 20	Reds	3–2	**Reuschel** (9–6)	Soto	—	7,827	36–79
116	August 21	Reds	5–8	Browning	**Walk** (0–1)	Franco	17,198	36–80
117	August 22	Reds	5–1	**Rhoden** (8–13)	Tibbs	**Scurry** (2)	10,437	37–80
118	August 23	Astros	0–2 (10)	Dawley	**Clements** (0–1)	DiPino	4,198	37–81
119	August 25	Astros	9–3	**Reuschel** (10–6)	Scott	—		38–81
120	August 25	Astros	10–9	**Robinson** (4–8)	Calhoun	—	7,929	39–81
121	August 26	@ Braves	1–2	Garber	**Robinson** (4–9)	—	4,125	39–82
122	August 27	@ Braves	6–7	Garber	**Robinson** (4–10)	—	4,580	39–83
123	August 28	@ Braves	1–6	Barker	**Tunnell** (1–9)	McMurtry	5,187	39–84
124	August 29	@ Reds	0–6	Browning	**DeLeon** (2–15)	—	18,789	39–85
125	August 30	@ Reds	0–1	Tibbs	**Reuschel** (10–7)	—	21,253	39–86
126	August 31	@ Reds	6–0	**Walk** (1–1)	McGaffigan	—	28,656	40–86

September: 13–14 (Home: 8–8; Away: 5–6)

#	Date	Opponent	Score	Win	Loss	Save	Attendance	Record
127	September 1	@ Reds	2–3	Soto	**Scurry** (0–1)	Franco	30,062	40–87
128	September 2	Braves	5–4	**Tunnell** (2–9)	Mahler	**Guante** (3)	5,378	41–87
129	September 3	Braves	0–2	Johnson	**DeLeon** (2–16)	Sutter	3,019	41–88
130	September 4	Braves	2–0	**Reuschel** (11–7)	Perez	—	4,613	42–88
131	September 5	@ Astros	3–4	Knepper	**Walk** (1–2)	Smith	6,003	42–89
132	September 6	@ Astros	3–4 (10)	Dawley	**Robinson** (4–11)	—	7,163	42–90
133	September 7	@ Astros	7–1	**Tunnell** (3–9)	Kerfeld	—	15,999	43–90
134	September 10	Cubs	2–1	**Reuschel** (12–7)	Engel	—	3,133	44–90
135	September 11	Cubs	1–3	Meridith	**DeLeon** (2–17)	Baller	5,432	44–91
136	September 12	Cubs	10–2	**Rhoden** (9–13)	Eckersley	**Robinson** (3)	3,439	45–91
137	September 13	Phillies	3–6	Denny	**Walk** (1–3)	Tekulve	4,429	45–92
138	September 14	Phillies	6–3	**Tunnell** (4–9)	Carlton	**Guante** (4)	5,549	46–92
139	September 15	Phillies	5–4	**Reuschel** (13–7)	Shipanoff	—	5,961	47–92
140	September 16	Cardinals	4–8	Tudor	**DeLeon** (2–18)	Worrell		47–93
141	September 16	Cardinals	1–3	Perry	**Clements** (0–2)	—	3,601	47–94
142	September 17	Cardinals	4–10	Andujar	**Kipper** (0–1)	—	3,924	47–95
143	September 18	@ Expos	10–6 (11)	**Robinson** (5–11)	Roberge	—	8,448	48–95
144	September 19	@ Expos	8–6 (10)	**Winn** (3–5)	Burke	—	7,627	49–95
145	September 20	@ Mets	7–5 (11)	**Guante** (4–5)	Latham	**DeLeon** (1)	33,803	50–95
146	September 21	@ Mets	1–12	Gooden	**Rhoden** (9–14)	—	49,931	50–96
147	September 22	@ Mets	5–3	**Kipper** (1–1)	Leach	**Clements** (2)	35,679	51–96
148	September 23	@ Cardinals	4–5	Lahti	**Guante** (4–6)	Worrell	17,611	51–97
149	September 24	@ Cardinals	4–5	Horton	**Tunnell** (4–10)	Dayley	20,054	51–98
150	September 25	Expos	8–2	**Reuschel** (14–7)	Laskey	—	2,648	52–98
151	September 27	Mets	8–7	**McWilliams** (6–8)	Gardner	**DeLeon** (2)	4,843	53–98
152	September 28	Mets	1–3	Aguilera	**Kipper** (1–2)	Orosco	4,410	53–99
153	September 29	Mets	7–9 (10)	Orosco	**McWilliams** (6–9)	—	13,956	53–100

October: 4–4 (Home: 0–0; Away: 4–4)

#	Date	Opponent	Score	Win	Loss	Save	Attendance	Record
154	October 1	@ Cubs	3–4	Patterson	**Reuschel** (14–8)	Smith	3,446	53–101
155	October 2	@ Cubs	9–4	**Rhoden** (10–14)	Sutcliffe	**Guante** (5)	4,637	54–101
156	October 3	@ Cubs	5–13	Perlman	**Winn** (3–6)	Engel	7,437	54–102
157	October 4	@ Phillies	7–2	**Walk** (2–3)	Denny	**DeLeon** (3)		55–102
158	October 4	@ Phillies	5–8	Carman	**DeLeon** (2–19)	—	12,410	55–103
159	October 5	@ Phillies	4–2	**McWilliams** (7–9)	Toliver	**Reuschel** (1)		56–103
160	October 5	@ Phillies	5–0	**Bielecki** (2–3)	Childress	—	21,820	57–103
161	October 6	@ Phillies	0–5	Gross	**Rhoden** (10–15)	—	13,749	57–104

Legend: = Win = Loss
Bold = Pirates team member

== Roster ==
1985 Pittsburgh Pirates
Roster
Pitchers: 34 Mike Bielecki; 45 John Candelaria; 15 Pat Clements; 25 José DeLeón; 47 Cecilio Guante; 35 Al Holland; 51 Bob Kipper; 46 Ray Krawczyk; 49 Larry McWilliams; 48 Rick Reuschel; 29 Rick Rhoden; 43 Don Robinson; 19 Rod Scurry; 27 Kent Tekulve; 35 Dave Tomlin; 22 Lee Tunnell; 18 Bob Walk; 41 Jim Winn	Catchers: 26 Junior Ortiz; 6 Tony Peña; Infielders: 12 Bill Almon; 37 Rafael Belliard; 5 Sid Bream; 17 Jerry Dybzinski; 10 Tim Foli; 24 Denny González; 27 Sammy Khalifa; 10 Johnnie LeMaster; 5 Bill Madlock; 16 Lee Mazzilli; 2 Jim Morrison; 3 Johnny Ray; 30 Jason Thompson	Outfielders: 17 Mike Brown; 17 Trench Davis; 51 Doug Frobel; 15 George Hendrick; 13 Steve Kemp; 28 Sixto Lezcano; 17 Scott Loucks; 11 Joe Orsulak; 39 R. J. Reynolds; 36 Marvell Wynne	Manager: 7 Chuck Tanner; Coaches: 32 Steve Demeter (First base); 31 Milt Graff (Bench); 23 Grant Jackson (Pitching); 55 Rick Peterson (Bullpen); 4 Bob Skinner (Third base); 8 Willie Stargell (First base)

=== Opening Day lineup ===
Opening Day Starters
#	Name	Position
36	Marvell Wynne	CF
3	Johnny Ray	2B
5	Bill Madlock	3B
30	Jason Thompson	1B
15	George Hendrick	RF
6	Tony Peña	C
51	Doug Frobel	LF
10	Tim Foli	SS
29	Rick Rhoden	SP

== Player stats ==
= Indicates team leader

Batting

Note: G = Games played; AB = At bats; H = Hits; Avg. = Batting average; HR = Home runs; RBI = Runs batted in

Regular season
Player	G	AB	H	Avg.	HR	RBI
A. Holland	38	5	2	0.400	0	0
P. Clements	27	3	1	0.333	0	0
M. Brown	57	205	68	0.332	5	33
R. Reynolds	31	130	40	0.308	3	17
J. Orsulak	121	397	119	0.300	0	21
J. Ortiz	23	72	21	0.292	1	5
S. Loucks	4	7	2	0.286	0	1
S. Bream	26	95	27	0.284	3	15
L. Mazzilli	92	117	33	0.282	1	9
J. Ray	154	594	163	0.274	7	70
B. Almon	88	244	66	0.270	6	29
J. Morrison	92	244	62	0.254	4	22
B. Madlock	110	399	100	0.251	10	41
S. Kemp	92	236	59	0.250	2	21
B. Kipper	5	8	2	0.250	0	0
T. Peña	147	546	136	0.249	10	59
J. Thompson	123	402	97	0.241	12	61
D. Robinson	44	21	5	0.238	1	4
S. Khalifa	95	320	76	0.238	2	31
G. Hendrick	69	256	59	0.230	2	25
D. González	35	124	28	0.226	4	12
S. Lezcano	72	116	24	0.207	3	9
M. Wynne	103	337	69	0.205	2	18
D. Frobel	53	109	22	0.202	0	7
R. Belliard	17	20	4	0.200	0	1
T. Foli	19	37	7	0.189	0	2
R. Rhoden	37	74	14	0.189	0	6
R. Reuschel	31	59	10	0.169	1	7
J. LeMaster	22	58	9	0.155	1	6
T. Davis	2	7	1	0.143	0	0
L. McWilliams	32	40	5	0.125	0	2
J. Winn	30	18	2	0.111	0	0
L. Tunnell	24	47	4	0.085	0	1
C. Guante	63	17	1	0.059	0	0
J. DeLeón	31	36	2	0.056	0	0
M. Bielecki	13	10	0	0.000	0	0
J. Candelaria	37	1	0	0.000	0	0
J. Dybzinski	5	4	0	0.000	0	0
R. Scurry	30	4	0	0.000	0	0
B. Walk	9	17	0	0.000	0	0
R. Krawczyk	8	0	0	—	0	0
K. Tekulve	3	0	0	—	0	0
D. Tomlin	1	0	0	—	0	0
Team totals	161	5,436	1,340	0.247	80	535

Pitching

= Indicates league leader

Note: G = Games pitched; IP = Innings pitched; W = Wins; L = Losses; ERA = Earned run average; SO = Strikeouts

Regular season
Player	G	IP	W	L	ERA	SO
D. Tomlin	1	1	0	0	0.00	0
R. Reuschel	31	194	14	8	2.27	138
C. Guante	63	109	4	6	2.72	92
R. Scurry	30	47 2/3	0	1	3.21	43
A. Holland	38	58 2/3	1	3	3.38	47
J. Candelaria	37	54 1/3	2	4	3.64	47
P. Clements	27	34 1/3	0	2	3.67	17
B. Walk	9	58 2/3	2	3	3.68	40
D. Robinson	44	95 1/3	5	11	3.87	65
L. Tunnell	24	132 1/3	4	10	4.01	74
R. Rhoden	35	213 1/3	10	15	4.47	128
M. Bielecki	12	45 2/3	2	3	4.53	22
L. McWilliams	30	126 1/3	7	9	4.70	52
J. DeLeón	31	162 2/3	2	19	4.70	149
B. Kipper	5	24 2/3	1	2	5.11	13
J. Winn	30	75 2/3	3	6	5.23	22
R. Krawczyk	8	8 1/3	0	2	14.04	9
K. Tekulve	3	3 1/3	0	0	16.20	4
Team totals	161	1,445 1/3	57	104	3.97	962

== Awards and honors ==
- Rick Rueschel, Hutch Award, National League Comeback Player of the Year

1985 Major League Baseball All-Star Game

- Tony Peña, C, Reserve

== Transactions ==
- October 15, 1984 – Dale Mohorcic granted free agency.
- October 15, 1984 – Nelson Norman granted free agency.
- October 15, 1984 – Kelly Paris granted free agency.
- November 8, 1984 – Lee Lacy granted free agency.
- November 8, 1984 – Milt May granted free agency.
- December 3, 1984 – Drafted Junior Ortiz from the New York Mets in the 1984 rule 5 draft.
- December 12, 1984 – Traded Brian Harper and John Tudor to the St. Louis Cardinals. Received Steve Barnard (minors) and George Hendrick.
- December 20, 1984 – Traded Dale Berra, Jay Buhner and Alfonso Pulido to the New York Yankees. Received Tim Foli, Steve Kemp and cash.
- January 3, 1985 – Drafted Greg Vaughn in the 1st round (19th pick) of the 1985 amateur draft (January Secondary), but did not sign the player.
- January 3, 1985 – Drafted Derek Lee in the 9th round of the 1985 amateur draft (January), but did not sign the player.
- January 15, 1985 – Signed Juan Eichelberger as a free agent.
- January 22, 1985 – Signed Sixto Lezcano as a free agent.
- February 22, 1985 – Signed Orlando Merced as an amateur free agent.
- February 28, 1985 – Signed Rick Reuschel as a free agent.
- March 1, 1985 – Signed Scott Loucks as a free agent.
- April 7, 1985 – Released Juan Eichelberger.
- April 8, 1985 – Signed Bill Almon as a free agent.
- April 11, 1985 – Signed Jerry Dybzinski as a free agent.
- April 11, 1985 – Signed John Henry Johnson as a free agent.
- April 20, 1985 – Traded Kent Tekulve to the Philadelphia Phillies. Received Frankie Griffin (minors) and Al Holland.
- April 21, 1985 - Signed Larry Carroll to Watertown as free agent. University of Michigan.
- April 27, 1985 – Traded Steve Herz (minors) to the Philadelphia Phillies. Received Mike Diaz.
- May 30, 1985 – Traded a player to be named later to the Cleveland Indians. Received Johnnie LeMaster. The Pittsburgh Pirates sent Scott Bailes (July 3, 1985) to the Cleveland Indians to complete the trade.
- June 3, 1985 – Drafted Tommy Hinzo in the 1st round (4th pick) of the 1985 amateur draft (June Secondary), but did not sign the player.
- June 3, 1985 – Drafted Barry Bonds in the 1st round (6th pick) of the 1985 amateur draft. Player signed June 5, 1985.
- June 3, 1985 – Drafted Brett Gideon in the 6th round of the 1985 amateur draft.
- June 3, 1985 – Drafted Tommy Gregg in the 7th round of the 1985 amateur draft. Player signed June 7, 1985.
- June 3, 1985 – Drafted Bill Sampen in the 12th round of the 1985 amateur draft.
- June 3, 1985 – Drafted Tommy Shields in the 36th round of the 1985 amateur draft, but did not sign the player.
- June 17, 1985 – Released Tim Foli.
- July 26, 1985 – Released John Henry Johnson.
- August 2, 1985 – Traded John Candelaria, George Hendrick and Al Holland to the California Angels. Received a player to be named later, Mike Brown and Pat Clements. The California Angels sent Bob Kipper (August 16, 1985) to the Pittsburgh Pirates to complete the trade.
- August 12, 1985 – Sold Doug Frobel to the Montreal Expos.
- August 31, 1985 – Traded Bill Madlock to the Los Angeles Dodgers. Received players to be named later. The Los Angeles Dodgers sent R.J. Reynolds (September 3, 1985), Cecil Espy (September 9, 1985) and Sid Bream (September 9, 1985) to the Pittsburgh Pirates to complete the trade.
- September 14, 1985 – Sold Rod Scurry to the New York Yankees.
- October 4, 1985 – Released Jerry Dybzinski.
- October 4, 1985 – Released Mitchell Page.
- October 4, 1985 – Released Eddie Vargas.
- October 15, 1985 – Dave Tomlin granted free agency.

== Farm system ==
Level	Team	League	Manager
AAA	Hawaii Islanders	Pacific Coast League	Tommy Sandt
AA	Nashua Pirates	Eastern League	Johnny Lipon
A	Prince William Pirates	Carolina League	Ed Ott
A	Macon Pirates	South Atlantic League	Mike Quade
A-Short Season	Watertown Pirates	New York–Penn League	Woody Hunt
Rookie	GCL Pirates	Gulf Coast League	Woody Huyke
