= 1985 Cincinnati Reds season =

1985 Cincinnati Reds
- League: National League
- Division: West
- Ballpark: Riverfront Stadium
- City: Cincinnati
- Record: 89–72 (.553)
- Divisional place: 2nd
- Owners: Marge Schott
- General managers: Bill Bergesch
- Managers: Pete Rose
- Television: WLWT (Ken Wilson, Joe Morgan)
- Radio: WLW (Marty Brennaman, Joe Nuxhall)

The 1985 Cincinnati Reds season was the 116th season for the franchise in Major League Baseball, and their 16th and 15th full season at Riverfront Stadium. The Cincinnati Reds improved on their 70–92 record from the previous season to finish at 89–72, but missed the postseason for the 6th consecutive year and they finished in second place, 5½ games behind the Los Angeles Dodgers. This year, the Reds adopted an alternate uniform. Reds pitcher Tom Browning became the last 20th century pitcher to win 20 games in his rookie year.

== Regular season ==
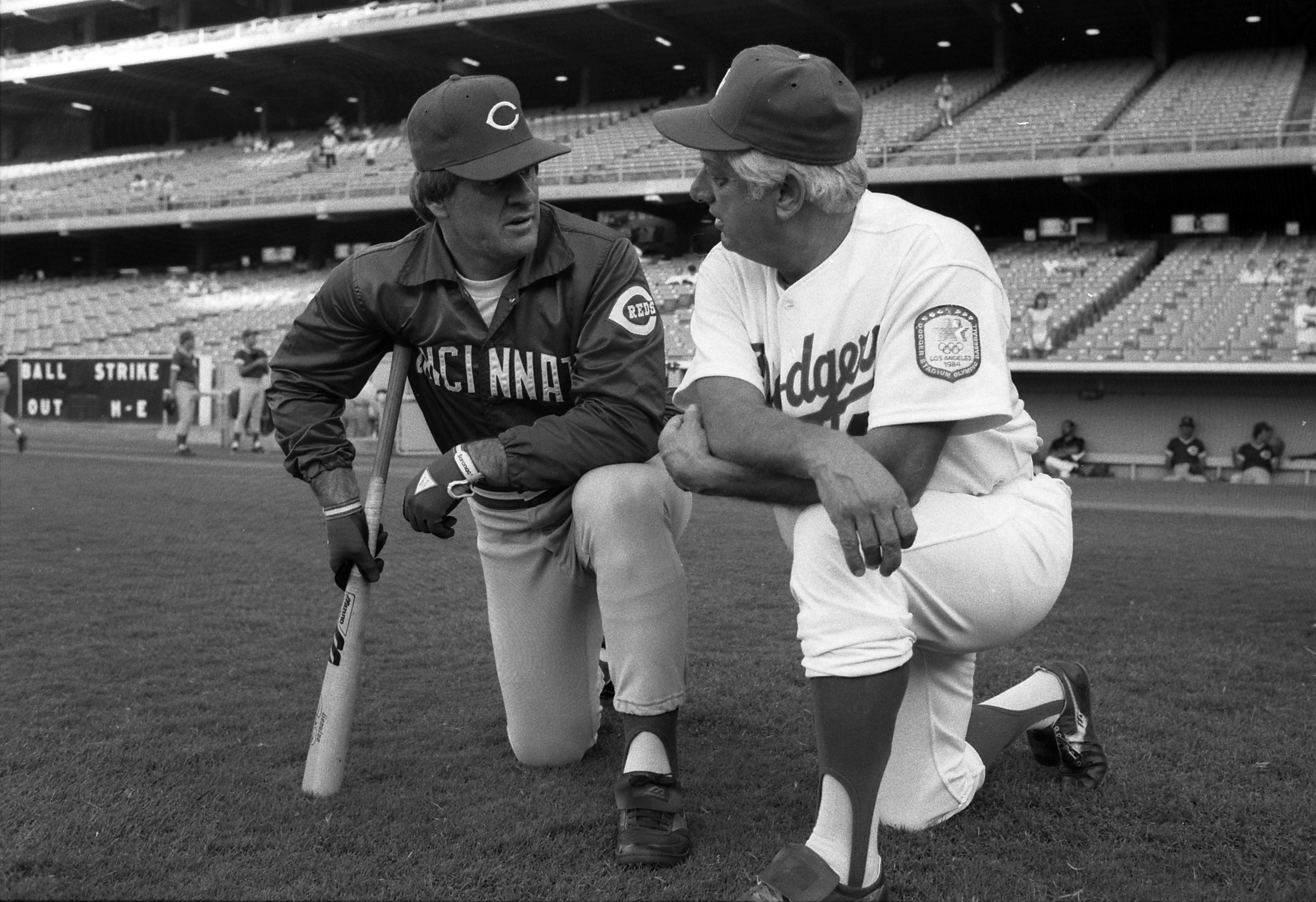
Rose (left) with Tommy Lasorda before a game in April 1985

=== Pete Rose ===
On September 11, 1985, Rose was thought to have broken Ty Cobb's all-time hits record with his 4,192nd hit, a single to left-center field off San Diego Padres pitcher Eric Show. A subsequent independent review of Cobb's hits, however, revealed that two of them were double-counted. As a result, it has been suggested that Pete Rose actually broke the all-time hits record against the Cubs' Reggie Patterson with a single in the first in the Reds 5-5 called game against Chicago on September 8.

=== Season standings ===
NL West
Team	W	L	Pct.	GB	Home	Road
Los Angeles Dodgers	95	67	.586	—	48‍–‍33	47‍–‍34
Cincinnati Reds	89	72	.553	5½	47‍–‍34	42‍–‍38
Houston Astros	83	79	.512	12	44‍–‍37	39‍–‍42
San Diego Padres	83	79	.512	12	44‍–‍37	39‍–‍42
Atlanta Braves	66	96	.407	29	32‍–‍49	34‍–‍47
San Francisco Giants	62	100	.383	33	38‍–‍43	24‍–‍57

=== Record vs. opponents ===
1985 National League record Sources:
Team	ATL	CHC	CIN	HOU	LAD	MON	NYM	PHI	PIT	SD	SF	STL
Atlanta	—	5–7	7–11	8–10	5–13	3–9	2–10	10–2	6–6	7–11	10–8	3–9
Chicago	7–5	—	5–6	5–7	5–7	7–11	4–14	13–5	13–5	8–4	6–6	4–14
Cincinnati	11–7	6–5	—	11–7	7–11	8–4	4–8	7–5	9–3	9–9	12–6	5–7
Houston	10–8	7–5	7–11	—	6–12	6–6	4–8	4–8	6–6	12–6	15–3	6–6
Los Angeles	13–5	7–5	11–7	12–6	—	7–5	7–5	4–8	8–4	8–10	11–7	7–5
Montreal	9–3	11–7	4–8	6–6	5–7	—	9–9	8–10	9–8	5–7	7–5	11–7
New York	10–2	14–4	8–4	8–4	5–7	9–9	—	11–7	10–8	7–5	8–4	8–10
Philadelphia	2-10	5–13	5–7	8–4	8–4	10–8	7–11	—	11–7	5–7	6–6	8–10
Pittsburgh	6–6	5–13	3–9	6–6	4–8	8–9	8–10	7–11	—	4–8	3–9	3–15
San Diego	11–7	4–8	9–9	6–12	10–8	7–5	5–7	7–5	8–4	—	12–6	4–8
San Francisco	8–10	6–6	6–12	3–15	7–11	5–7	4–8	6–6	9–3	6–12	—	2–10
St. Louis	9–3	14–4	7–5	6–6	5–7	7–11	10–8	10–8	15–3	8–4	10–2	—

=== Notable transactions ===
- April 10, 1985: Tony Pérez was signed as a free agent by the Reds.
- April 26, 1985: Skeeter Barnes was traded by the Reds to the Montreal Expos for Max Venable.
- June 3, 1985: Barry Larkin was drafted by the Reds in the 1st round (4th pick) of the 1985 amateur draft.
- June 12, 1985: Brad Gulden was purchased by the Houston Astros from the Cincinnati Reds.
- July 19, 1985: Buddy Bell was acquired from the Texas Rangers for Duane Walker and a player to be named later. The Cincinnati Reds later sent Jeff Russell to the Rangers to complete the trade.
- August 8, 1985: Alan Knicely, Tom Foley and a player to be named later were traded by the Reds to the Philadelphia Phillies for Bo Díaz and Greg Simpson (minors). The Reds completed the deal by sending Freddie Toliver to the Phillies on August 27.
- August 29, 1985: César Cedeño was traded by the Reds to the St. Louis Cardinals for Mark Jackson (minors).

=== Roster ===
1985 Cincinnati Reds roster
Roster
Pitchers: 32 Tom Browning; 51 Bob Buchanan; 31 John Franco; 47 Tom Hume; 37 Andy McGaffigan; 46,54 Rob Murphy; 35 Frank Pastore; 48 Ted Power; 49 Joe Price; 33 Ron Robinson; 34,53 Mike Smith; 36 Mario Soto; 42 John Stuper; 38 Jay Tibbs; 40 Carl Willis	Catchers: 11 Dann Bilardello; 8 Bo Díaz; 34 Alan Knicely; 23 Dave Van Gorder; Infielders: 25 Buddy Bell; 13 Dave Concepción; 12 Nick Esasky; 10 Tom Foley; 15 Wayne Krenchicki; 16 Ron Oester; 24 Tony Pérez; 14 Pete Rose; 17,56 Wade Rowdon; 10 Tom Runnells	Outfielders: 28 César Cedeño; 44 Eric Davis; 20 Eddie Milner; 21,57 Paul O'Neill; 39 Dave Parker; 2 Gary Redus; 9 Max Venable; 26 Duane Walker	Manager: 14 Pete Rose; Coaches: 7 Billy DeMars; 19 Tommy Helms; 45 Jim Kaat; 6 Bruce Kimm; 3 George Scherger

== Player stats ==
= Indicates team leader

= Indicates league leader

=== Batting ===
==== Starters by position ====
Note: Pos = Position; G = Games played; AB = At bats; H = Hits; Avg. = Batting average; HR = Home runs; RBI = Runs batted in

Pos	Player	G	AB	R	H	Avg.	HR	RBI	SB
C	Dave Van Gorder	73	151	12	36	.238	2	24	0
1B	Pete Rose	119	405	60	107	.264	2	46	8
2B	Ron Oester	152	526	59	155	.295	1	34	5
3B	Buddy Bell	67	247	28	54	.219	6	36	0
SS	Dave Concepción	155	560	59	141	.252	7	48	16
LF	Nick Esasky	125	413	61	108	.262	21	66	3
CF	Eddie Milner	145	453	82	115	.254	3	33	35
RF	Dave Parker	160	635	88	198	.312	34	125	5

==== Other batters ====
Note: G = Games played; AB = At bats; H = Hits; Avg. = Batting average; HR = Home runs; RBI = Runs batted in

Player	G	AB	R	H	Avg.	HR	RBI	SB
Gary Redus	101	246	51	62	.252	6	28	48
César Cedeño	83	220	24	53	.241	3	30	9
Tony Pérez	72	183	25	60	.328	6	33	0
Wayne Krenchicki	90	173	16	47	.272	4	25	0
Bo Díaz	51	161	12	42	.261	3	15	0
Alan Knicely	48	158	17	40	.253	5	26	0
Max Venable	77	135	21	39	.289	0	10	11
Eric Davis	56	122	26	30	.246	8	18	16
Dann Bilardello	42	102	6	17	.167	1	9	0
Tom Foley	43	92	7	18	.196	0	6	1
Duane Walker	37	48	5	8	.167	2	6	1
Tom Runnells	28	35	3	7	.200	0	0	0
Paul O'Neill	5	12	1	4	.333	0	1	0
Wade Rowdon	5	9	2	2	.222	0	2	0

=== Pitching ===
==== Starting pitchers ====
Note: G = Games pitched; IP = Innings pitched; W = Wins; L = Losses; ERA = Earned run average; SO = Strikeouts

Player	G	IP	W	L	ERA	SO
Tom Browning	38	261.1	20	9	3.55	155
Mario Soto	36	256.2	12	15	3.58	214
Jay Tibbs	35	218.0	10	16	3.92	98
Andy McGaffigan	15	94.1	3	3	3.72	83

==== Other pitchers ====
Note: G = Games pitched; IP = Innings pitched; W = Wins; L = Losses; ERA = Earned run average; SO = Strikeouts

Player	G	IP	W	L	ERA	SO
Ron Robinson	33	108.1	7	7	3.99	76
John Stuper	33	99.0	8	5	4.55	38
Joe Price	26	64.2	2	2	3.90	52
Frank Pastore	17	54.0	2	1	3.83	29

==== Relief pitchers ====
Note: G = Games pitched; W = Wins; L = Losses; SV = Saves; ERA = Earned run average; SO = Strikeouts

Player	G	W	L	SV	ERA	SO
Ted Power	64	8	6	27	2.70	42
John Franco	67	12	3	12	2.18	61
Tom Hume	56	3	5	3	3.26	50
Bob Buchanan	14	1	0	0	8.44	3
Carl Willis	11	1	0	1	9.22	6
Mike Smith	2	0	0	0	5.40	2
Rob Murphy	2	0	0	0	6.00	1

== Awards and honors ==
- Dave Parker – National League Leader in RBIs (125)
- Dave Parker – National League Leader in Doubles (42)

All-Star Game

- Pete Rose, 1B, Reserve
- Dave Parker, OF, Reserve

== Farm system ==
Level	Team	League	Manager
AAA	Denver Zephyrs	American Association	Gene Dusan
AA	Vermont Reds	Eastern League	Jack Lind
A	Tampa Tarpons	Florida State League	Marc Bombard
A	Cedar Rapids Reds	Midwest League	Jay Ward
Rookie	GCL Reds	Gulf Coast League	Sam Mejías
Rookie	Billings Mustangs	Pioneer League	Jim Lett

LEAGUE CHAMPIONS: Vermont
