= Cecil Espy =

American baseball player (born 1963)

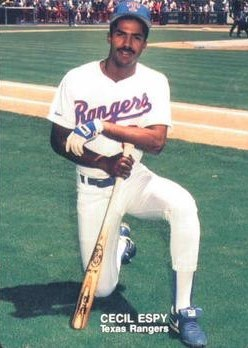
- Outfielder
- Born: October 20, 1963 (age 62); San Diego, California, U.S.
- Batted: Switch Threw: Right

MLB debut
- September 2, 1983, for the Los Angeles Dodgers

Last MLB appearance
- June 13, 1993, for the Cincinnati Reds

MLB statistics
- Batting average: .244
- Home runs: 7
- Runs batted in: 108
- Stats at Baseball Reference

Teams
- Los Angeles Dodgers (1983); Texas Rangers (1987–1990); Pittsburgh Pirates (1991–1992); Cincinnati Reds (1993)

Cecil Edward Espy (born October 20, 1963) is an American former professional baseball outfielder. He played in Major League Baseball for the Los Angeles Dodgers, Texas Rangers, Pittsburgh Pirates, and Cincinnati Reds in 1983 and 1987–1993.

== Career ==
Espy was a first-round pick of the Chicago White Sox in the 1980 Major League Baseball draft, the eighth player chosen, ahead of such other first-round picks as Kelly Gruber (10th overall), Terry Francona (22nd overall) and Billy Beane (23rd overall). He was traded in the spring of 1982 along with Bert Geiger to the Los Angeles Dodgers for outfielder Rudy Law.

Making his big-league debut at age 20 on September 2, 1983, with the Dodgers as a late-season call-up, Espy appeared in 11 games. He then had to wait until 1987 to return to the majors.

On August 31, 1985, the Pittsburgh Pirates traded disgruntled veteran infielder Bill Madlock to the Los Angeles Dodgers for three player(s)-to-be-named-later. The first PTBNL was Utility man R.J. Reynolds, who was sent from LA to Pittsburgh on September 3. Nearly a week later on September 9th, Espy was sent to Pittsburgh alongside Sid Bream as the last two PTBNL's.

Before Espy got a chance to play in the Major Leagues with Pittsburgh, he was selected by the Texas Rangers in the 1986 Rule 5 Draft. He played in 14 games in 1987, but did not record a hit. In 1988, he saw much more action on the field, getting into 123 games. He slashed .248/.288/.349 and swiped 33 bags. He finished the season with an 8th-place finish in the AL Rookie of the Year voting. His 1989 season with Texas was arguably the best of his career, where he slashed .257/.313/.331 while stealing a career-high 45 bases (while also getting caught a league-leading 20 times). Espy was granted free agency after a poor 1990 campaign.

He signed with the Pittsburgh Pirates where he played 43 & 112 games in 1991 and 1992, respectively. Manager Jim Leyland liked using Espy as a role player who could come off the bench whenever he was needed, whether that be as a pinch hitter, pinch runner, or a defensive replacement. Pittsburgh placed him on unconditional release waivers after the 1992 season, where he was claimed by the Cincinnati Reds.

He played in 40 games before being released by the Reds in 1993.

In 546 games over eight seasons, Espy posted a .244 batting average (304-for-1248) with 160 runs, 7 home runs, 108 RBI and 103 stolen bases. He recorded a .976 fielding percentage as an outfielder.
