= 1985 Atlanta Braves season =

1985 Atlanta Braves
- League: National League
- Division: West
- Ballpark: Atlanta–Fulton County Stadium
- City: Atlanta
- Record: 66–96 (.407)
- Divisional place: 5th
- Owners: Ted Turner
- General managers: John Mullen
- Managers: Eddie Haas, Bobby Wine
- Television: WTBS; Superstation WTBS
- Radio: WSB (Ernie Johnson, Pete Van Wieren, Skip Caray, John Sterling)

The 1985 Atlanta Braves season was the 20th in Atlanta and the 115th season in franchise history. The Braves failed to qualify for the postseason for the third consecutive season.

== Offseason ==
- December 5, 1984: Brian Fisher was traded by the Braves to the New York Yankees for Rick Cerone.
- December 7, 1984: Bruce Sutter was signed as a free agent by the Braves.

== Managerial turnover ==
Joe Torre had managed the Braves to the 1982 National League West Division title, then to a second-place 1983 finish (three games from the division title). But his 1984 Braves fell below the .500 mark and 12 lengths behind the division-champion San Diego Padres. Torre was fired when the 1984 campaign ended and replaced by coach Eddie Haas, who had been a successful pilot in the Braves' farm system. But Haas' appointment did not rouse the 1985 Braves, who were at 50–71 (.413), in fifth place in the NL West and mired in a six-game losing streak when Haas was relieved of his duties August 25. Haas' immediate successor, coach Bobby Wine, finished the season and compiled a 16–25 (.390) mark. During the offseason, the Braves would hire former Pittsburgh Pirates skipper Chuck Tanner as their 1986 manager.

== Regular season ==
In addition to a new manager, the 1985 Braves had a new relief ace in Bruce Sutter. They also had slugger Bob Horner in the lineup and Dale Murphy was back as well.

The Braves started the season 4–1 but lost three consecutive games to the Reds at home to fall to .500. A 9–5 win over the Astros on Friday, April 19, gave the Braves a 5–4 record, good enough for second place, a half-game out. However, the Braves would not be above the .500 mark again. They lost three straight games to drop into fifth place with a 5–7 mark. Later, the Braves beat the Reds twice, 8–4 and 17–9 to even their record at 10–10, and to climb within a game of first place. This was on May 1, and the Braves led the National League in runs scored.

Things changed quickly, however. The Braves not only lost eight of their next ten games (May 3–14), they were also shut out four consecutive games (May 8–12). They were held to only one run in each of the two games that followed, one of which was a win. The 12–18 Braves were in last place, six games out. Atlanta improved to 16–19 and 4 1/2 games out of first following a 3–0 win over Chicago on May 19. The Braves then lost three straight to the Cardinals, the beginning of a 4–11 stretch that lowered their record to 20–30 on June 7. Atlanta was 10 1/2 games behind at that point and the Braves' situation was becoming precarious. They won their next three games by impressive margins, 7–3 and 10–3 over Los Angeles and 70 over San Francisco. By June 28, Atlanta was 33–38 and 9 1/2 games of first place. They were mired in fifth place, however.

The Braves lost nine of their next 11 games and were 35–47 on July 10, in fifth place and 12 games out. They swept the Philadelphia Phillies in four games just before the All-Star Break. Atlanta was 39–47 at the half, in fifth place and 9 1/2 out.

The Braves were 49–59 on August 11, in fifth place and 15 games out. It was basically over for the Braves, with no real chance at first place. Atlanta lost six in a row and were 16 games below the .500 mark, the first time since 1979. After a 6–3 win over San Diego halted the losing streak the Braves lost six straight again. At this point the Braves were 50–71 and 22 games out of first, Haas was fired and Wine took the helm. The Braves won their first five games under the new manager. However, they fizzled out with an 11–25 finish that dropped them to 66–96 and 29 games out of first place. Thanks to the San Francisco Giants' even poorer performance, the Braves avoided last place and finished in fifth place, a position they had held for all but one day since May 15.

=== The "Rick Camp homer" game ===
On July 4, the New York Mets beat the Braves 16-13 in a 19-inning contest that featured Keith Hernandez hitting for the cycle, Mets manager Davey Johnson being ejected, and the Braves coming back to tie the game twice in extra innings, most notably in the bottom of the 18th.

Relief pitcher Rick Camp, a career .074 hitter batting only because the Braves had no position players left, shockingly hit a solo home run on a 0-2 pitch in the 18th off Tom Gorman to re-tie the game at 11-11.

Once the game was over, even though the date/time was July 5, 3:55 am, the Braves' stadium crew shot off the scheduled Fourth of July post-game fireworks for the fans who endured to the end. Ironically, Camp struck out to end the game.

=== Season standings ===
NL West
Team	W	L	Pct.	GB	Home	Road
Los Angeles Dodgers	95	67	.586	—	48‍–‍33	47‍–‍34
Cincinnati Reds	89	72	.553	5½	47‍–‍34	42‍–‍38
Houston Astros	83	79	.512	12	44‍–‍37	39‍–‍42
San Diego Padres	83	79	.512	12	44‍–‍37	39‍–‍42
Atlanta Braves	66	96	.407	29	32‍–‍49	34‍–‍47
San Francisco Giants	62	100	.383	33	38‍–‍43	24‍–‍57

=== Record vs. opponents ===
1985 National League record Sources:
Team	ATL	CHC	CIN	HOU	LAD	MON	NYM	PHI	PIT	SD	SF	STL
Atlanta	—	5–7	7–11	8–10	5–13	3–9	2–10	10–2	6–6	7–11	10–8	3–9
Chicago	7–5	—	5–6	5–7	5–7	7–11	4–14	13–5	13–5	8–4	6–6	4–14
Cincinnati	11–7	6–5	—	11–7	7–11	8–4	4–8	7–5	9–3	9–9	12–6	5–7
Houston	10–8	7–5	7–11	—	6–12	6–6	4–8	4–8	6–6	12–6	15–3	6–6
Los Angeles	13–5	7–5	11–7	12–6	—	7–5	7–5	4–8	8–4	8–10	11–7	7–5
Montreal	9–3	11–7	4–8	6–6	5–7	—	9–9	8–10	9–8	5–7	7–5	11–7
New York	10–2	14–4	8–4	8–4	5–7	9–9	—	11–7	10–8	7–5	8–4	8–10
Philadelphia	2-10	5–13	5–7	8–4	8–4	10–8	7–11	—	11–7	5–7	6–6	8–10
Pittsburgh	6–6	5–13	3–9	6–6	4–8	8–9	8–10	7–11	—	4–8	3–9	3–15
San Diego	11–7	4–8	9–9	6–12	10–8	7–5	5–7	7–5	8–4	—	12–6	4–8
San Francisco	8–10	6–6	6–12	3–15	7–11	5–7	4–8	6–6	9–3	6–12	—	2–10
St. Louis	9–3	14–4	7–5	6–6	5–7	7–11	10–8	10–8	15–3	8–4	10–2	—

=== Notable transactions ===
- April 17, 1985: Alex Treviño was traded by the Braves to the San Francisco Giants for John Rabb.
- June 3, 1985: Al Martin was drafted by the Braves in the 8th round of the 1985 Major League Baseball draft.

=== Roster ===
1985 Atlanta Braves
Roster
Pitchers: 39 Len Barker; 32 Steve Bedrosian; 37 Rick Camp; 49 Jeff Dedmon; 51 Terry Forster; 26 Gene Garber; 38 Joe Johnson; 42 Rick Mahler; 29 Craig McMurtry; 27 Pascual Pérez; 23 Dave Schuler; 43 Steve Shields; 34 Zane Smith; 40 Bruce Sutter	Catchers: 20 Bruce Benedict; 5 Rick Cerone; 8 Larry Owen; Infielders: 10 Chris Chambliss; 11 Bob Horner; 17 Glenn Hubbard; 24 Ken Oberkfell; 28 Gerald Perry; 16 Rafael Ramírez; 12 Paul Runge; 14 Andrés Thomas; 18 Paul Zuvella	Outfielders: 2 Albert Hall; 19 Terry Harper; 36 Brad Komminsk; 3 Dale Murphy; 31 John Rabb; 30 Milt Thompson; 15 Claudell Washington	Manager: 22 Eddie Haas; 7 Bobby Wine; Coaches: 53 Dal Maxvill; 52 Leo Mazzone; 33 Johnny Sain; 50 Brian Snitker; 7 Bobby Wine

== In the front office: Bobby Cox returns as GM ==
With Tanner's hiring, Braves' owner Ted Turner had employed four different managers in the period of 13 months. But Turner made a more momentous change in his executive offices on October 22, 1985, when he replaced general manager John Mullen, on the job since Bill Lucas' sudden death in May 1979, with former Atlanta field manager Bobby Cox, who had just piloted the Toronto Blue Jays to the 1985 American League East Division pennant. As general manager, Cox began a long rebuilding process that would last five seasons, and see Cox draft, develop or acquire players like Tom Glavine, John Smoltz, Chipper Jones, David Justice and Steve Avery. But the continued struggles of the Braves on the field would result in Cox' return to uniform as Atlanta's field manager on June 23, 1990. Although the Braves continued their losing ways, going only 40–57 (.412) under Cox in 1990, they were poised to break into sustained contention in 1991, with 14 division titles in 15 seasons, five National League championships and the 1995 World Series title. Cox would enter the Baseball Hall of Fame on the strength of his successful managerial career, which ended with his 2010 retirement.

== Player stats ==
= Indicates team leader

= Indicates league leader

=== Batting ===
==== Starters by position ====
Note: Pos = Position; G = Games played; AB = At bats; H = Hits; Avg. = Batting average; HR = Home runs; RBI = Runs batted in

Pos	Player	G	AB	H	Avg.	HR	RBI
C	Rick Cerone	96	282	61	.216	3	25
1B	Bob Horner	130	483	129	.267	27	89
2B	Glenn Hubbard	142	439	102	.232	5	39
3B	Ken Oberkfell	134	412	112	.272	3	35
SS	Rafael Ramírez	138	568	141	.248	5	58
LF	Terry Harper	138	492	130	.264	17	72
CF	Dale Murphy	162	616	185	.300	37	111
RF	Claudell Washington	122	398	110	.276	15	43

==== Other batters ====
Note: G = Games played; AB = At bats; H = Hits; Avg. = Batting average; HR = Home runs; RBI = Runs batted in

Player	G	AB	H	Avg.	HR	RBI
Brad Komminsk	106	300	68	.227	4	21
Gerald Perry	110	238	51	.214	3	13
Bruce Benedict	70	208	42	.202	0	20
Paul Zuvella	81	190	48	.253	0	4
Milt Thompson	73	182	55	.302	0	6
Chris Chambliss	101	170	40	.235	3	21
Paul Runge	50	87	19	.218	1	5
Larry Owen	26	71	17	.239	2	12
Albert Hall	54	47	7	.149	0	3
Andrés Thomas	15	18	5	.278	0	2
John Rabb	3	2	0	.000	0	0

=== Pitching ===
==== Starting pitchers ====
Note: G = Games pitched; IP = Innings pitched; W = Wins; L = Losses; ERA = Earned run average; SO = Strikeouts

Player	G	IP	W	L	ERA	SO
Rick Mahler	39	266.2	17	15	3.48	107
Steve Bedrosian	37	206.2	7	15	3.83	134
Pascual Pérez	22	95.1	1	13	6.14	57
Joe Johnson	15	85.2	4	4	4.10	34
Len Barker	20	73.2	2	9	6.35	47

==== Other pitchers ====
Note: G = Games pitched; IP = Innings pitched; W = Wins; L = Losses; ERA = Earned run average; SO = Strikeouts

Player	G	IP	W	L	ERA	SO
Zane Smith	42	147.0	9	10	3.80	85
Steve Shields	23	68.0	1	2	5.16	29
Craig McMurtry	17	45.0	0	3	6.60	28

==== Relief pitchers ====
Note: G = Games pitched; W = Wins; L = Losses; SV = Saves; ERA = Earned run average; SO = Strikeouts

Player	G	W	L	SV	ERA	SO
Bruce Sutter	58	7	7	23	4.48	52
Rick Camp	66	4	6	3	3.95	49
Jeff Dedmon	60	6	3	0	4.08	41
Gene Garber	59	6	6	1	3.61	66
Terry Forster	46	2	3	1	2.28	37
Dave Schuler	9	0	0	0	6.75	10

== Awards and honors ==
- Steve Bedrosian, Major League record, Most Starts in a season without completing a game (37)

== Farm system ==
Level	Team	League	Manager
AAA	Richmond Braves	International League	Roy Majtyka
AA	Greenville Braves	Southern League	Jim Beauchamp
A	Durham Bulls	Carolina League	Harry Bright
A	Sumter Braves	South Atlantic League	Buddy Bailey
Rookie	Pulaski Braves	Appalachian League	Craig Robinson
Rookie	GCL Braves	Gulf Coast League	Pedro González
