= 1985 San Diego Padres season =

1985 San Diego Padres
- League: National League
- Division: West
- Ballpark: Jack Murphy Stadium
- City: San Diego
- Record: 83–79 (.512)
- Divisional place: 4th
- Owners: Joan Kroc
- General managers: Jack McKeon
- Managers: Dick Williams
- Television: KCST; San Diego Cable Sports Network (Dave Campbell, Jerry Coleman, Bob Chandler, Ted Leitner)
- Radio: KFMB (AM) (Dave Campbell, Jerry Coleman); XEXX (Gustavo Lopez, Mario Thomas Zapiain)

The 1985 San Diego Padres season was the 17th season in franchise history. Led by manager Dick Williams, the Padres were unable to defend their National League championship.

== Offseason ==
- December 3, 1984: Doug Gwosdz was drafted from the Padres by the San Francisco Giants in the 1984 rule 5 draft.
- January 3, 1985: Jerry Royster was signed as a free agent by the Padres.
- February 7, 1985: Fritzie Connally was traded by the Padres to the Baltimore Orioles for Vic Rodriguez.
- February 13, 1985: Greg Harris was purchased from the Padres by the Texas Rangers.
- February 16, 1985: Roberto Alomar was signed by the Padres as an amateur free agent.

== Regular season ==
- Steve Garvey's errorless games streak ended on April 14, 1985. The streak started on June 26, 1983.
- LaMarr Hoyt tied a club record by winning 11 straight decisions.

=== Opening Day starters ===
- Steve Garvey
- Tony Gwynn
- Terry Kennedy
- Carmelo Martínez
- Kevin McReynolds
- Jerry Royster
- Eric Show
- Garry Templeton
- Alan Wiggins

=== Season standings ===
NL West
Team	W	L	Pct.	GB	Home	Road
Los Angeles Dodgers	95	67	.586	—	48‍–‍33	47‍–‍34
Cincinnati Reds	89	72	.553	5½	47‍–‍34	42‍–‍38
Houston Astros	83	79	.512	12	44‍–‍37	39‍–‍42
San Diego Padres	83	79	.512	12	44‍–‍37	39‍–‍42
Atlanta Braves	66	96	.407	29	32‍–‍49	34‍–‍47
San Francisco Giants	62	100	.383	33	38‍–‍43	24‍–‍57

=== Record vs. opponents ===
1985 National League record Sources:
Team	ATL	CHC	CIN	HOU	LAD	MON	NYM	PHI	PIT	SD	SF	STL
Atlanta	—	5–7	7–11	8–10	5–13	3–9	2–10	10–2	6–6	7–11	10–8	3–9
Chicago	7–5	—	5–6	5–7	5–7	7–11	4–14	13–5	13–5	8–4	6–6	4–14
Cincinnati	11–7	6–5	—	11–7	7–11	8–4	4–8	7–5	9–3	9–9	12–6	5–7
Houston	10–8	7–5	7–11	—	6–12	6–6	4–8	4–8	6–6	12–6	15–3	6–6
Los Angeles	13–5	7–5	11–7	12–6	—	7–5	7–5	4–8	8–4	8–10	11–7	7–5
Montreal	9–3	11–7	4–8	6–6	5–7	—	9–9	8–10	9–8	5–7	7–5	11–7
New York	10–2	14–4	8–4	8–4	5–7	9–9	—	11–7	10–8	7–5	8–4	8–10
Philadelphia	2-10	5–13	5–7	8–4	8–4	10–8	7–11	—	11–7	5–7	6–6	8–10
Pittsburgh	6–6	5–13	3–9	6–6	4–8	8–9	8–10	7–11	—	4–8	3–9	3–15
San Diego	11–7	4–8	9–9	6–12	10–8	7–5	5–7	7–5	8–4	—	12–6	4–8
San Francisco	8–10	6–6	6–12	3–15	7–11	5–7	4–8	6–6	9–3	6–12	—	2–10
St. Louis	9–3	14–4	7–5	6–6	5–7	7–11	10–8	10–8	15–3	8–4	10–2	—

=== Notable transactions ===
- April 6, 1985: Mitch Williams was traded by the Padres to the Texas Rangers for Randy Asadoor.

=== Roster ===
1985 San Diego Padres
Roster
Pitchers: 51 Greg Booker; 35 Luis DeLeón; 43 Dave Dravecky; 54 Goose Gossage; 40 Andy Hawkins; 31 LaMarr Hoyt; 39 Roy Lee Jackson; 37 Craig Lefferts; 50 Lance McCullers; 46 Bob Patterson; 30 Eric Show; 49 Tim Stoddard; 38 Mark Thurmond; 48 Gene Walter; 26 Ed Wojna	Catchers: 15 Bruce Bochy; 16 Terry Kennedy; Infielders: 7 Kurt Bevacqua; 11 Tim Flannery; 6 Steve Garvey; 9 Graig Nettles; 12 Mario Ramírez; 3 Jerry Royster; 1 Garry Templeton; 2 Alan Wiggins	Outfielders: 20 Bobby Brown; 4 Al Bumbry; 28 Gerry Davis; 17 Miguel Diloné; 19 Tony Gwynn; 14 Carmelo Martínez; 18 Kevin McReynolds; Other batters: 39 Edwin Rodríguez	Manager: 23 Dick Williams; Coaches: 36 Galen Cisco; 33 Harry Dunlop; 29 Deacon Jones; 34 Jack Krol; 32 Ozzie Virgil

== Player stats ==
=== Batting ===
==== Starters by position ====
Note: Pos = Position; G = Games played; AB = At bats; H = Hits; Avg. = Batting average; HR = Home runs; RBI = Runs batted in

Pos	Player	G	AB	H	Avg.	HR	RBI
C	Terry Kennedy	143	532	139	.261	10	74
1B	Steve Garvey	162	654	184	.281	17	81
2B	Tim Flannery	126	384	108	.281	1	40
SS	Garry Templeton	148	546	154	.282	6	55
3B	Graig Nettles	137	440	115	.261	15	61
LF	Carmelo Martínez	150	514	130	.253	21	72
CF	Kevin McReynolds	152	564	132	.234	15	75
RF	Tony Gwynn	154	622	197	.317	6	46

==== Other batters ====
Note: G = Games played; AB = At bats; H = Hits; Avg. = Batting average; HR = Home runs; RBI = Runs batted in

Player	G	AB	H	Avg.	HR	RBI
Jerry Royster	90	249	70	.281	5	31
Kurt Bevacqua	71	138	33	.239	3	25
Bruce Bochy	48	112	30	.268	6	13
Al Bumbry	68	95	19	.200	1	10
Bobby Brown	79	84	13	.155	0	6
Mario Ramírez	37	60	17	.283	2	5
Gerry Davis	44	58	17	.293	0	2
Miguel Diloné	27	46	10	.217	0	1
Alan Wiggins	10	37	2	.054	0	0
Edwin Rodríguez	1	1	0	.000	0	0

=== Pitching ===
==== Starting pitchers ====
Note: G = Games pitched; IP = Innings pitched; W = Wins; L = Losses; ERA = Earned run average; SO = Strikeouts

Player	G	IP	W	L	ERA	SO
Eric Show	35	233.0	12	11	3.09	141
Andy Hawkins	33	228.2	18	8	3.15	69
Dave Dravecky	34	214.2	13	11	2.93	105
LaMarr Hoyt	31	210.1	16	8	3.47	83

==== Other pitchers ====
Note: G = Games pitched; IP = Innings pitched; W = Wins; L = Losses; ERA = Earned run average; SO = Strikeouts

Player	G	IP	W	L	ERA	SO
Mark Thurmond	36	138.1	7	11	3.97	57
Ed Wojna	15	42.0	2	4	5.79	18

==== Relief pitchers ====
Note; G = Games pitched; W = Wins; L = Losses; SV = Saves; ERA = Earned run average; SO = Strikeouts

Player	G	W	L	SV	ERA	SO
Rich Gossage	50	5	3	26	1.82	52
Craig Lefferts	60	7	6	2	3.35	48
Tim Stoddard	44	1	6	1	4.65	42
Luis DeLeón	29	0	3	3	4.19	31
Roy Lee Jackson	22	2	3	2	2.70	28
Lance McCullers	21	0	2	5	2.31	27
Greg Booker	17	0	1	0	6.85	7
Gene Walter	15	0	2	3	2.05	18
Bob Patterson	3	0	0	0	24.75	1

== Award winners ==
- Garry Templeton, tied Major League record with four Intentional Walks in a game on July 5, 1985

1985 Major League Baseball All-Star Game

- LaMarr Hoyt, pitcher, reserve
  - Hoyt was the Winning Pitcher for the National League
- Garry Templeton, shortstop, reserve
- LaMarr Hoyt, All-Star Game Most Valuable Player

== Farm system ==
Level	Team	League	Manager
AAA	Las Vegas Stars	Pacific Coast League	Bob Cluck
AA	Beaumont Golden Gators	Texas League	Bobby Tolan
A	Reno Padres	California League	Steve Smith
A	Charleston Rainbows	South Atlantic League	Jim Skaalen
A-Short Season	Spokane Indians	Northwest League	Jack Maloof
