= Tom Niedenfuer =

American baseball player (born 1959)

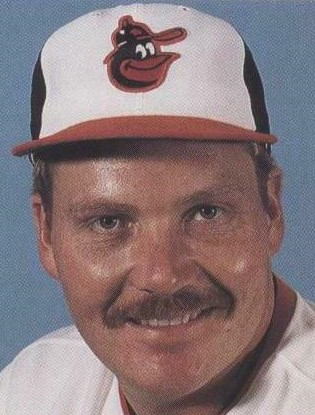
- Pitcher
- Born: August 13, 1959 (age 66); St. Louis Park, Minnesota, U.S.
- Batted: Right Threw: Right

MLB debut
- August 15, 1981, for the Los Angeles Dodgers

Last MLB appearance
- September 20, 1990, for the St. Louis Cardinals

MLB statistics
- Win–loss record: 36–46
- Earned run average: 3.29
- Strikeouts: 474
- Saves: 97
- Stats at Baseball Reference

Teams
- Los Angeles Dodgers (1981–1987); Baltimore Orioles (1987–1988); Seattle Mariners (1989); St. Louis Cardinals (1990)

Career highlights and awards
- World Series champion (1981)

Thomas Edward Niedenfuer (born August 13, 1959) is an American former professional baseball right-handed pitcher. Exclusively a reliever during his ten-year career, he played his first six-plus seasons for the Los Angeles Dodgers, then finished out with the Baltimore Orioles, Seattle Mariners, and St. Louis Cardinals.

== Amateur career ==
Born in St. Louis Park, Minnesota, Niedenfuer first moved with his family to Pennsylvania when he was three, and later moved to Washington when he was in the third grade. Raised in Redmond, Washington, he graduated from Redmond High School in 1977 and was selected in the 36th round of the MLB draft by the Dodgers.

Niedenfuer did not sign and played college baseball; he was a standout pitcher for the Washington State Cougars in Pullman under head coach Bobo Brayton. He signed with the Dodgers as an amateur free agent in August 1980, prior to his senior season at WSU.

== Professional career ==
Niedenfuer started 1981 with the San Antonio Dodgers of the Double-A Texas League. As a 6 ft 5 in (1.96 m) rookie in the strike-shortened 1981 season, he debuted in the majors in mid-August.

He appeared in 17 games for the Dodgers, and excelled in the World Series, pitching five innings in two games (1,4) with no runs allowed as the Dodgers defeated the New York Yankees in six games.

Niedenfuer's best all-around year was 1983, when he pitched in a career-high 66 games and posted an 8–3 record with 11 saves and a 1.90 earned run average. He went 7–9 in 1985, but posted career highs in saves (19) and innings pitched (106.1), with a 2.71 ERA.

In the National League Championship Series, he gave up a walk-off home run to light-hitting shortstop Ozzie Smith in Game 5 that gave the St. Louis Cardinals a one-game lead.

Two days later at Dodger Stadium, he was victimized by a Jack Clark three-run homer with two outs in the ninth inning that gave the Cardinals the pennant in six games.

In 1987, during his seventh season with the Dodgers, he went 1–0 with a 2.76 ERA in 15 games before being traded on May 22 to the Baltimore Orioles. He struggled in the American League the rest of the season, with a 4.99 ERA in 45 games; 1988 was better, posting a 3.51 ERA with 18 saves.

Niedenfuer became a free agent after 1988, and spent one season each with the Seattle Mariners and St. Louis Cardinals, going a combined 0–9 and retired with 484 career appearances.

== Personal life ==
Niedenfuer was married to Lisa Byers from 1982 to 1985. He has been married to actress Judy Landers since November 1987, and they have resided in Sarasota, Florida, since 1996. They have two daughters, Lindsey and Kristy, who own and operate an event-planning company and perform in a pop music band together.
