= Eric Show =

American baseball player (1956–1994)

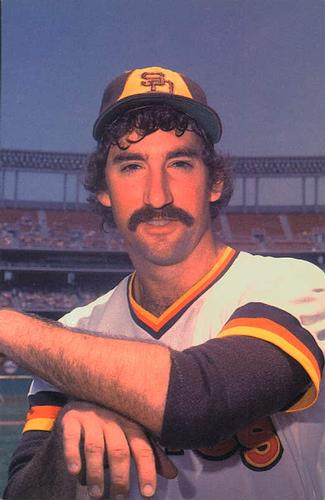
- Show in a 1983 postcard
- Pitcher
- Born: May 19, 1956; Riverside, California, U.S.
- Died: March 16, 1994 (aged 37); Dulzura, California, U.S.
- Batted: Right Threw: Right

MLB debut
- September 2, 1981, for the San Diego Padres

Last MLB appearance
- September 30, 1991, for the Oakland Athletics

MLB statistics
- Win–loss record: 101–89
- Earned run average: 3.66
- Strikeouts: 971
- Stats at Baseball Reference

Teams
- San Diego Padres (1981–1990); Oakland Athletics (1991)

Eric Vaughn Show (/ʃaʊ/ SHOW; May 19, 1956 – March 16, 1994) was an American professional baseball player who was a pitcher in Major League Baseball (MLB). He spent most of his career with the San Diego Padres and holds the team record for most career wins (100). Show was a member of the first Padres team to play in the World Series in 1984. On September 11, 1985, he surrendered Pete Rose's record-breaking 4,192nd career hit.

Show's later life was affected by drug abuse; at age 37, he was found dead in his room at a drug and alcohol rehabilitation facility in 1994.

== Early life ==
Eric Show was born in Riverside, California, as the oldest of three children to Les and Yvonne Show. He was shepherded into playing baseball from a young age by his father, who would physically and verbally abuse his son if he did not perform well. His father's persistence in forcing his son into a baseball career at all costs even extended to college, as he attempted to call signals for him to pitch before being stopped by the team catcher. He attended the University of California, Riverside, where he majored in physics and played college baseball for the Highlanders from 1976 to 1978. In 1977, Show won a Division II College World Series with the team.

== Playing career ==
=== 1981–1984 ===
Show made his major league debut in late September 1981, and the following year went 10–6 while splitting time between the starting rotation and bullpen. He won fifteen games in 1983, and followed with a 15–9 record in 1984. However, he struggled in the postseason, going a combined 0–2 with a 12.38 earned run average in three games.

=== "The Hit" ===
On September 11, 1985, in a game against the Cincinnati Reds, Show became famous for giving up Pete Rose's 4,192nd hit, which surpassed the career hit record that had long been held by Ty Cobb. During the delay to honor Rose, Show sat on the mound with his arms folded. In The Ballplayers: Baseball's Ultimate Biographical Reference, Mike Shatzkin wrote that Show was "disgruntled (perhaps rightly so) at the lengthy interruption of the contest." Padres teammate Garry Templeton later called Show's actions "bush." Show then got into a dugout shoving match with left fielder Carmelo Martínez over a ball that fell for a single and led to the game-winning run. Finally, Show refused to stay to answer the post-game questions, leaving his teammates to criticize him in his absence. "I'm tired of hearing about his unlucky luck," said Tim Flannery. "That's been at the root of the problem all year. If something goes wrong, he quits. That's why runs aren't scored for him. Guys don't want to play for him. One guy got tired of hearing it."

Before the game, when Show had been asked about the possibility of giving up "The Hit", he responded: "I guess it doesn't mean as much to me as it does to other baseball enthusiasts. I mean, in the eternal scope of things, how much does this matter? I don't like to say this, but I don't care. ... Don't get me wrong. I'm certainly not putting down Pete. It's a fantastic accomplishment." "Gosh, he felt so bad after that, and he didn't know how to articulate it," said teammate Dave Dravecky. "Sometimes when you're brilliant like he was, the simplest of things are the hardest of things to express." Show later offered, "We have a choice – to think or not to think – and I've come to the conclusion that most of these guys don't want to think about anything but baseball, and I'm kind of ostracized for that."

=== Later career ===
On July 7, 1987, Show hit the year's eventual National League MVP, Andre Dawson of the Chicago Cubs, in the left cheekbone with a fastball during a game. Dawson had homered in three of his last five plate appearances at that point, and the Cubs reacted with a bench-clearing brawl. Show and his manager (and former Cub), Larry Bowa, later denied that the pitch was on purpose, while Bowa acknowledged that he could understand why the Cubs would think it was.

Show made his last appearance on the National League leaderboard in 1988, a season in which he went 16–11 with 13 complete games and pitched 234 2/3 innings. In June 1989, Show underwent back surgery and then received cortisone injections for ongoing back discomfort. Show began to show signs of drug addiction later in his career, and some of his teammates suspected that the problems had started as Show attempted to relieve his back pain.

By 1990, Show had lost his regular spot in San Diego's rotation. The Padres did not pick up his option and bought out his contract for $250,000. Though Show had become known for his tardiness and confrontations with teammates and management in San Diego, the Oakland Athletics had taken risks on troubled players before. They signed Show as a free agent prior to the 1991 season. Show also played in 1990–91 with the Mayaguez Indians of the Puerto Rican Winter League.

Show's episodes of erratic behavior began to involve law enforcement by 1991. He was arrested by the police in downtown San Diego while yelling that someone was trying to kill him. Placed inside a police car, he kicked out the window and fled on foot. He was apprehended later that day, and he admitted to having used crystal methamphetamine. Show arrived later that year at the Oakland A's training camp with bandaged hands; reports had been made of his acting oddly inside an adult bookstore, and Show tried to flee from police, cutting his hands on a barbed wire fence. Oakland released Show during spring training in 1992, and he never appeared in professional baseball again.

== Personal life ==
Within baseball, Show's intellectual interests set him apart. Flannery said that most baseball players were singularly focused on baseball, while Show enjoyed discussing subjects like politics and economics. The pitcher was also a born-again Christian and a jazz musician who was known to play guitar with the hotel lounge bands during team road trips. He was involved in real estate and marketing, and also owned a music store.

In 1984, Show revealed that he was a member of the John Birch Society. In response to questions about his membership, he stated his "fundamental philosophy of less government, more reason, and with God's help, a better world, and that's it." When people asked whether Show's membership in the far-right organization indicated that he was racist, teammate Tony Gwynn defended Show against such charges. Show's agent, Arn Tellem, said that his membership in the group was part of his search for answers about how the world worked. After Show gave up Rose's record-breaking hit, Graig Nettles wisecracked, "The Birch Society is going to expel Eric for making a Red famous."

Show was married to Cara Mia Niederhouse, whom he had met while playing in a summer college baseball league in Kansas. They had no children.

== Death ==
After his retirement from baseball, Show continued to struggle with drug abuse. After a month-long stay at a drug rehabilitation center in Dulzura, California, Show checked out of the facility on March 14, 1994. He called the center the next night, admitted to having used alcohol, heroin and cocaine, and asked to come back for more treatment. He was found dead in his room at the treatment center on the morning of March 16. Dravecky delivered the eulogy at Show's funeral. He was buried at Olivewood Memorial Park in Riverside.

== See also ==
- List of San Diego Padres team records

== Bibliography ==
- Dravecky, Dave; Yorkey, Mike (2004). Called Up: Stories of Life and Faith from the Great Game of Baseball. Grand Rapids: Zondervan. ISBN 0-310-25230-X.
