= Scott Loucks =

American baseball player (born 1956)

- Outfielder
- Born: November 11, 1956 (age 69); Anchorage, Alaska, U.S.
- Batted: Right Threw: Right

MLB debut
- September 1, 1980, for the Houston Astros

Last MLB appearance
- May 29, 1985, for the Pittsburgh Pirates

MLB statistics
- Batting average: .263
- Home runs: 0
- Runs batted in: 4
- Stats at Baseball Reference

Teams
- Houston Astros (1980–1983); Pittsburgh Pirates (1985)

Scott Gregory Loucks (born November 11, 1956) is an American former Major League Baseball outfielder. He played parts of five seasons in the majors between 1980 and 1985. In none of those seasons did he accumulate more than 49 at bats or 11 hits. Both of those high-water marks came in 1982 for the Houston Astros, when he was used in 44 games, mainly as a pinch hitter, pinch runner and/or defensive replacement.

== Sources ==
- Career statistics from Baseball Reference · Baseball Reference (Minors) · Retrosheet · Baseball Almanac
