= Bob Buchanan (baseball) =

American baseball player (born 1961)

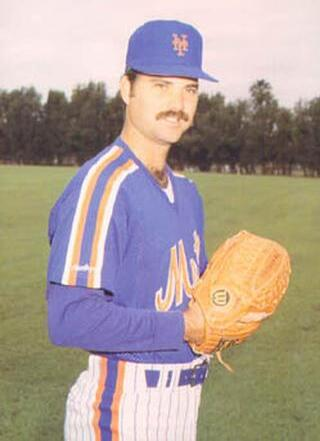
- Buchanan with the New York Mets c. 1987
- Pitcher
- Born: May 3, 1961 (age 65); Ridley Park, Pennsylvania, U.S.
- Batted: Left Threw: Left

MLB debut
- July 13, 1985, for the Cincinnati Reds

Last MLB appearance
- July 16, 1989, for the Kansas City Royals

MLB statistics
- Win–loss record: 1–0
- Earned run average: 9.78
- Strikeouts: 6
- Stats at Baseball Reference

Teams
- Cincinnati Reds (1985); Kansas City Royals (1989)

Robert Gordon Buchanan (born May 3, 1961) is an American former Major League Baseball pitcher. He played during two seasons at the major league level, playing for the Cincinnati Reds and Kansas City Royals. He was drafted by the Reds in the 2nd round of the 1979 amateur draft. Buchanan played his first professional season with their Rookie league Billings Mustangs in 1979, and his last with their Triple-A club, the Nashville Sounds in 1992. He attended Riverview High School.
