= Trench Davis =

American baseball player (born 1960)

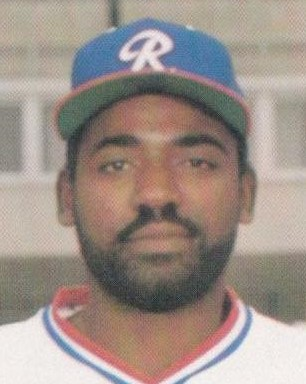
- Center fielder
- Born: September 12, 1960 (age 65); Baltimore, Maryland, U.S.
- Batted: Left Threw: Left

MLB debut
- June 4, 1985, for the Pittsburgh Pirates

Last MLB appearance
- July 3, 1987, for the Atlanta Braves

MLB statistics
- Batting average: .121
- At bats: 33
- Runs batted in: 1
- Stats at Baseball Reference

Teams
- Pittsburgh Pirates (1985–1986); Atlanta Braves (1987)

Trench Neal Davis (born September 12, 1960) is an American former professional baseball player, born in Baltimore, Maryland, who played in 23 Major League games over a period of three seasons.

== Career ==
Signed as an amateur free agent in 1980, Davis spent six season in the minor leagues prior to playing his first major league game with the Pittsburgh Pirates. After playing 17 major league games over two seasons and seven years in the Pirates organization, he was released on October 15, 1986, and granted free agency. Davis signed with the Atlanta Braves on November 17, 1986. He played the majority of the 1987 season with the Braves minor league affiliated in Richmond before playing in six major league games.
