= Jay Tibbs =

American baseball player (born 1962)

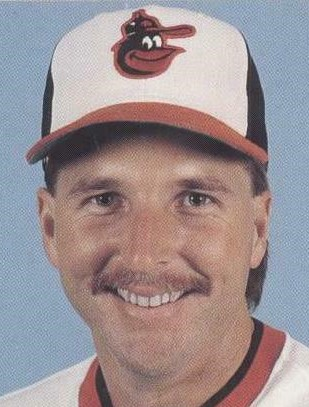
- Pitcher
- Born: January 4, 1962 (age 63); Birmingham, Alabama, U.S.
- Batted: Right Threw: Right

MLB debut
- July 15, 1984, for the Cincinnati Reds

Last MLB appearance
- July 7, 1990, for the Pittsburgh Pirates

MLB statistics
- Win–loss record: 39–54
- Earned run average: 4.20
- Strikeouts: 448
- Stats at Baseball Reference

Teams
- Cincinnati Reds (1984–1985); Montreal Expos (1986–1987); Baltimore Orioles (1988–1990); Pittsburgh Pirates (1990)

Jay Lindsey Tibbs (born January 4, 1962) is an American former Major League Baseball pitcher with a seven-year career from 1984 to 1990. Tibbs graduated from Huffman High School in 1980, the same year he was named Alabama's High School Player of the year. He played for the Cincinnati Reds, Montreal Expos, Baltimore Orioles, and Pittsburgh Pirates. He had two winning seasons and a career earned run average of 4.20.
