= R. J. Reynolds (baseball) =

American baseball player (born 1959)

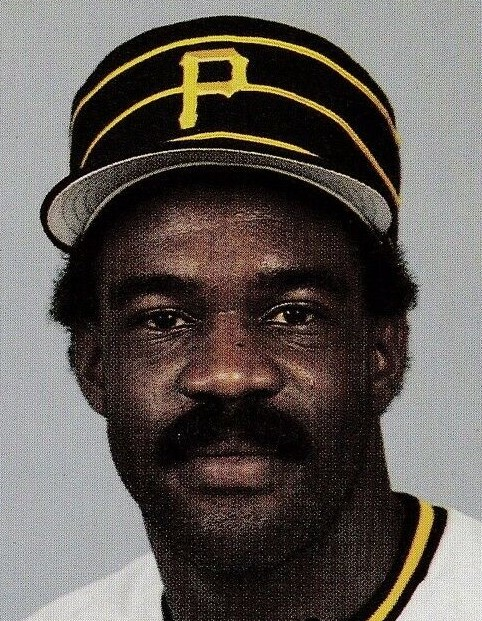
- Outfielder
- Born: April 19, 1959 (age 66); Sacramento, California, U.S.
- Batted: Switch Threw: Right

Professional debut
- MLB: September 1, 1983, for the Los Angeles Dodgers
- NPB: April 6, 1991, for the Yokohama Taiyo Whales

Last appearance
- MLB: October 2, 1990, for the Pittsburgh Pirates
- NPB: October 10, 1993, for the Kintetsu Buffaloes

MLB statistics
- Batting average: .267
- Home runs: 35
- Runs batted in: 294

NPB statistics
- Batting average: .288
- Home runs: 52
- Runs batted in: 196
- Stats at Baseball Reference

Teams
- Los Angeles Dodgers (1983–1985); Pittsburgh Pirates (1985–1990); Yokohama Taiyo Whales (1991–1992); Kintetsu Buffaloes (1993)

Robert James Reynolds (born April 19, 1959) is a former outfielder in Major League Baseball. He played with the Los Angeles Dodgers and the Pittsburgh Pirates, from 1983 to 1990. He also played in Japan for the Yokohama Taiyo Whales and Kintetsu Buffaloes, from 1991 to 1993.

== Career ==
Reynolds broke in as a September call-up with the Dodgers in 1983. On September 11, Reynolds' suicide squeeze bunt in the bottom of the ninth inning helped the Dodgers defeat the Atlanta Braves amid the pennant race. The Dodgers finished three games ahead of the second-place Braves.

Reynolds spent 1984 and most of 1985 with the Dodgers, playing in more than half the team's games. On August 31, 1985, just before the trade deadline, the Dodgers obtained third baseman Bill Madlock from the Pirates to shore up their run for the playoffs. Three days later, Reynolds was sent to Pittsburgh (along with Cecil Espy and Sid Bream) as a player to be named later.

Leading off the Pirates 1986 season opener, Reynolds hit a home run off of the New York Mets' Dwight Gooden. He played in all six games of the 1990 NLCS, getting two hits and two walks in ten at-bats as the Pirates fell to the eventual champion Cincinnati Reds.

After the 1990 season, Reynolds did not re-sign with the Pirates or any other Major League team. He played for three years in Japan before retiring at age 34.

In 786 games over eight seasons, Reynolds posted a .267 batting average (605-for-2270) with 288 runs, 35 home runs, 294 RBIs, 109 stolen bases and 190 bases on balls. He finished his career with a .973 fielding percentage playing at all three outfield positions.
