= 1985 Chicago Cubs season =

1985 Chicago Cubs
- League: National League
- Division: East
- Ballpark: Wrigley Field
- City: Chicago
- Record: 77–84 (.478)
- Divisional place: 4th
- Owners: Tribune Company
- General managers: Dallas Green
- Managers: Jim Frey
- Television: WGN-TV/Superstation WGN (Harry Caray, Steve Stone, Dewayne Staats)
- Radio: WGN (Dewayne Staats, Vince Lloyd, Lou Boudreau, Harry Caray)
- Stats: ESPN.com; Baseball Reference

The 1985 Chicago Cubs season was the 114th season of the Chicago Cubs franchise, the 110th in the National League and the 70th at Wrigley Field. The Cubs finished fourth in the National League East with a record of 77–84. The season had opened with high hopes as the Cubs had won the NL East title the year before. However, injuries were a major factor as four of the Cubs' starting pitchers were on the disabled list at the same time.

== Offseason ==
- November 28, 1984: Dennis Eckersley was signed as a free agent by the Chicago Cubs.
- December 4, 1984: Ron Hassey, Porfi Altamirano, Rich Bordi, and Henry Cotto were traded by the Chicago Cubs to the New York Yankees for Ray Fontenot and Brian Dayett.
- December 7, 1984: Steve Trout was signed as a free agent by the Cubs.
- January 3, 1985: Guy Hoffman was signed as a free agent by the Cubs.

== Regular season ==
- Ryne Sandberg became the first Cub since 1969–1970 to score 100 runs in two consecutive seasons.

On June 11, the Cubs had a record of 35–19, and held a four-game lead over the New York Mets for the division. However, Rick Sutcliffe, Steve Trout, Scott Sanderson and Dennis Eckersley all were injured, and the Cubs went on a 13-game losing streak that effectively eliminated them from contention. The Cubs ultimately finished seven games below .500 after having been 16 games above .500. Shawon Dunston made his Major League debut. He struggled early on, so the Cubs sent him back to Iowa in early May. However, once he returned, it spelled the end for Larry Bowa, who was released in August and picked up by the New York Mets.

=== Season standings ===
NL East
Team	W	L	Pct.	GB	Home	Road
St. Louis Cardinals	101	61	.623	—	54‍–‍27	47‍–‍34
New York Mets	98	64	.605	3	51‍–‍30	47‍–‍34
Montreal Expos	84	77	.522	16½	44‍–‍37	40‍–‍40
Chicago Cubs	77	84	.478	23½	41‍–‍39	36‍–‍45
Philadelphia Phillies	75	87	.463	26	41‍–‍40	34‍–‍47
Pittsburgh Pirates	57	104	.354	43½	35‍–‍45	22‍–‍59

=== Record vs. opponents ===
1985 National League record Sources:
Team	ATL	CHC	CIN	HOU	LAD	MON	NYM	PHI	PIT	SD	SF	STL
Atlanta	—	5–7	7–11	8–10	5–13	3–9	2–10	10–2	6–6	7–11	10–8	3–9
Chicago	7–5	—	5–6	5–7	5–7	7–11	4–14	13–5	13–5	8–4	6–6	4–14
Cincinnati	11–7	6–5	—	11–7	7–11	8–4	4–8	7–5	9–3	9–9	12–6	5–7
Houston	10–8	7–5	7–11	—	6–12	6–6	4–8	4–8	6–6	12–6	15–3	6–6
Los Angeles	13–5	7–5	11–7	12–6	—	7–5	7–5	4–8	8–4	8–10	11–7	7–5
Montreal	9–3	11–7	4–8	6–6	5–7	—	9–9	8–10	9–8	5–7	7–5	11–7
New York	10–2	14–4	8–4	8–4	5–7	9–9	—	11–7	10–8	7–5	8–4	8–10
Philadelphia	2-10	5–13	5–7	8–4	8–4	10–8	7–11	—	11–7	5–7	6–6	8–10
Pittsburgh	6–6	5–13	3–9	6–6	4–8	8–9	8–10	7–11	—	4–8	3–9	3–15
San Diego	11–7	4–8	9–9	6–12	10–8	7–5	5–7	7–5	8–4	—	12–6	4–8
San Francisco	8–10	6–6	6–12	3–15	7–11	5–7	4–8	6–6	9–3	6–12	—	2–10
St. Louis	9–3	14–4	7–5	6–6	5–7	7–11	10–8	10–8	15–3	8–4	10–2	—

=== Notable transactions ===
- April 9, 1985: Jacob Brumfield was released by the Cubs.
- May 12, 1985: Dave Hostetler was purchased by the Chicago Cubs from the Montreal Expos.

==== Draft picks ====
- The Cubs drafted pitcher Dave Masters with the twenty-fourth overall pick in the 1985 Draft.
- June 3, 1985: Doug Dascenzo was drafted by the Chicago Cubs in the 12th round of the 1985 amateur draft. Player signed June 12, 1985.
- June 3, 1985: Mark Grace was drafted by the Cubs in the 24th round of the 1985 amateur draft. Player signed August 29, 1985.

== Roster ==
1985 Chicago Cubs
Roster
Pitchers: 32 Johnny Abrego; 48 Jay Baller; 50 Dave Beard; 47 Derek Botelho; 41 Warren Brusstar; 43 Dennis Eckersley; 49 Steve Engel; 31 Ray Fontenot; 39 George Frazier; 45 Dave Gumpert; 32 Larry Gura; 38 Ron Meridith; 52 Reggie Patterson; 35 Jon Perlman; 44 Dick Ruthven; 21 Scott Sanderson; 46 Lee Smith; 42 Lary Sorensen; 40 Rick Sutcliffe; 34 Steve Trout	Catchers: 7 Jody Davis; 16 Steve Lake; Infielders: 1 Larry Bowa; 11 Ron Cey; 12 Shawon Dunston; 10 Leon Durham; 18 Richie Hebner; 19 Dave Owen; 23 Ryne Sandberg; 28 Chris Speier	Outfielders: 27 Thad Bosley; 24 Brian Dayett; 20 Bob Dernier; 22 Billy Hatcher; 30 Darrin Jackson; 15 Davey Lopes; 36 Gary Matthews; 6 Keith Moreland; 30 Chico Walker; 25 Gary Woods	Manager: 8 Jim Frey; Coaches: 5 Rubén Amaro; 3 Billy Connors; 9 Johnny Oates; 2 John Vukovich; 4 Don Zimmer

=== Game log ===
1985 Chicago Cubs Game Log
April (12–6)

#	Date	Opponent	Score	Win	Loss	Save	Attendance	Record	Other Info
1	April 9	Pirates	2–1	Sutcliffe (1–0)	Rhoden (0–1)	Smith (1)	34,551	1–0	
2	April 11	Pirates	4–1	Trout (1–0)	DeLeón (0–1)		10,049	2–0	
3	April 12	Expos	5–1	Smith (1–0)	Eckersley (0–1)		14,337	2–1	
4	April 13	Expos	8–3	Sanderson (1–0)	Rogers (0–2)		32,212	3–1	
5	April 14	Expos	4–2	Sutcliffe (2–0)	Palmer (0–1)		31,512	4–1	
6	April 15	Phillies	2–1	Trout (2–0)	K. Gross (0–1)	Smith (2)	8,347	5–1	
7	April 16	Phillies	1 – 0 (10)	Eckersley (1–1)	Holland (0–1)		11,937	6–1	
8	April 17	Phillies	5–4	Frazier (1–0)	K. Gross (0–2)	Smith (3)	15,752	7–1	
9	April 19	@ Expos	5–3	Smith (2–0)	Sutcliffe (2–1)	Reardon (2)	30,930	7–2	
10	April 20	@ Expos	4–0	Gullickson (2–1)	Trout (2–1)	Reardon (3)	12,775	7–3	
11	April 21	@ Expos	4–0	Eckersley (2–1)	Palmer (0–2)		13,506	8–3	
12	April 22	@ Pirates	5–3	McWilliams (1–1)	Ruthven (0–1)	Candelaria (3)	6,329	8–4	
13	April 23	@ Pirates	5–0	Sutcliffe (3–1)	Bielecki (1–1)		9,387	9–4	
14	April 24	@ Pirates	5–2	Trout (3–1)	Rhoden (0–3)	Smith (4)	3,981	10–4	
15	April 26	@ Phillies	7–3	Eckersley (3–1)	Koosman (0–1)		27,187	11–4	
16	April 27	@ Phillies	6–1	Rawley (3–0)	Sanderson (1–1)		25,220	11–5	
17	April 28	@ Phillies	3–2	K. Gross (2–2)	Sutcliffe (3–2)	Andersen (2)	31,890	11–6	
18	April 30	Giants	3–1	Trout (4–1)	Laskey (0–3)	Smith (5)	12,647	12–6	

May (15–11)

#	Date	Opponent	Score	Win	Loss	Save	Attendance	Record	Other Info
19	May 1	Giants	4–3	Eckersley (4–1)	Garrelts (0–1)		14,490	13–6	
20	May 3	Padres	6–5	Hawkins (5–0)	Sutcliffe (3–3)	Gossage (7)	27,236	13–7	
21	May 4	Padres	12–8	Sorensen (1–0)	Booker (0–1)	Smith (6)	36,033	14–7	
22	May 5	Padres	6–3	Frazier (2–0)	DeLeón (0–2)		36,388	15–7	
23	May 6	Dodgers	5 – 4 (10)	Howell (2–1)	Fontenot (0–1)		20,796	15–8	
24	May 7	Dodgers	4–2	Ruthven (1–1)	Brennan (1–2)	Smith (7)	23,331	16–8	
25	May 8	@ Giants	1–0	Sutcliffe (4–3)	Krukow (2–2)		16,134	17–8	
26	May 9	@ Giants	1 – 0 (12)	Garrelts (1–1)	Brusstar (0–1)		11,825	17–9	
27	May 10	@ Padres	6–2	Trout (5–1)	Hoyt (2–3)	Smith (8)	39,638	18–9	
28	May 11	@ Padres	3–1	Show (4–2)	Eckersley (4–2)	Gossage (8)	54,395	18–10	
29	May 12	@ Padres	5–3	Dravecky (2–2)	Ruthven (1–2)	Gossage (9)	50,226	18–11	
30	May 14	@ Dodgers	8–3	Sutcliffe (5–3)	Valenzuela (3–4)		48,187	19–11	
31	May 15	@ Dodgers	3–2	Sanderson (2–1)	Honeycutt (2–3)	Smith (9)	46,213	20–11	
32	May 17	@ Braves	7–5	Smith (1–0)	Sutter (2–1)		20,901	21–11	
33	May 18	@ Braves	4–3	Mahler (8–2)	Eckersley (4–3)	Sutter (7)	39,136	21–12	
34	May 19	@ Braves	3–0	Bedrosian (1–2)	Sutcliffe (5–4)	Sutter (8)	30,389	21–13	
35	May 20	Reds	6–1	Sanderson (3–1)	Tibbs (3–6)		21,231	22–13	
36	May 21	Reds	5–2	Hume (1–2)	Frazier (2–1)	Power (8)	32,007	22–14	
37	May 22	Reds	7–4	Eckersley (5–3)	Browning (4–3)	Smith (10)	27,863	23–14	
38	May 24	Astros	6–2	Ryan (4–2)	Ruthven (1–3)		35,743	23–15	
39	May 25	Astros	5–4	Smith (2–0)	Ross (0–1)		36,278	24–15	
40	May 26	Astros	10–8	Frazier (3–1)	Ross (0–2)	Smith (11)	37,044	25–15	
41	May 27	@ Reds	4–3	Eckersley (6–3)	Browning (4–4)	Smith (12)	20,046	26–15	
42	May 28	@ Reds	13–11	Franco (2–1)	Sorensen (1–1)		15,121	26–16	
43	May 29	@ Reds	1–0	Soto (7–3)	Ruthven (1–4)		18,402	26–17	
44	May 31	@ Astros	6 – 2 (10)	Smith (3–0)	Smith (4–2)		33,440	27–17	

June (12–16)

#	Date	Opponent	Score	Win	Loss	Save	Attendance	Record	Other Info
45	June 1	@ Astros	4–1	Eckersley (7–3)	Knepper (5–1)		38,879	28–17	
46	June 2	@ Astros	4–3	Scott (3–2)	Gura (0–1)	Smith (8)	21,129	28–18	
47	June 4	Braves	5–3	Ruthven (2–4)	Mahler (8–5)	Smith (13)	23,502	29–18	
48	June 5	Braves	4 – 2 (11)	Dedmon (3–0)	Smith (3–1)		25,557	29–19	According to the Cubs game footage shown in the 1986 movie, Ferris Bueller's Day Off, he took his day off on this day.
49	June 6	Pirates	3 – 2 (12)	Brusstar (1–1)	Holland (1–3)		22,368	30–19	
50	June 7	Pirates	1–0	Sutcliffe (6–4)	DeLeón (1–8)		37,414	31–19	
51	June 8	Pirates	7–3	Trout (6–1)	McWilliams (3–4)		35,232	32–19	
52	June 9	Pirates	5–1	Ruthven (3–4)	Winn (1–1)	Brusstar (1)	36,475	33–19	
53	June 10	@ Expos	5–4	Fontenot (1–1)	Reardon (2–2)	Smith (14)	42,218	34–19	
54	June 11	@ Expos	5–3	Frazier (4–1)	St. Claire (1–1)	Smith (15)	28,303	35–19	
55	June 12	@ Expos	2–0	Palmer (5–5)	Sutcliffe (6–5)	Reardon (18)	10,378	35–20	
56	June 13	@ Expos	9–7	Smith (7–2)	Trout (6–2)	Reardon (19)	14,210	35–21	
57	June 14	Cardinals	11–10	Andújar (12–1)	Ruthven (3–5)	Forsch (1)	36,745	35–22	
58	June 15	Cardinals	2–0	Cox (8–2)	Fontenot (1–2)		34,716	35–23	
59	June 16	Cardinals	5–2	Kepshire (3–5)	Eckersley (7–4)	Campbell (3)	36,262	35–24	
60	June 17	@ Mets	2–0	Darling (6–1)	Sutcliffe (6–6)		41,986	35–25	
61	June 18	@ Mets	5–1	Lynch (4–3)	Trout (6–3)		41,125	35–26	
62	June 19	@ Mets	1–0	Gooden (10–3)	Sanderson (3–2)		51,778	35–27	
63	June 20	@ Mets	5–3	Fernandez (2–4)	Fontenot (1–3)	McDowell (4)	37,203	35–28	
64	June 21	@ Cardinals	7–5	Kepshire (4–5)	Eckersley (7–5)	Lahti (5)	46,005	35–29	
65	June 22	@ Cardinals	2 – 1 (10)	Dayley (1–0)	Smith (3–2)		49,231	35–30	
66	June 23	@ Cardinals	7–0	Tudor (6–7)	Ruthven (3–6)		45,881	35–31	
67	June 25	Mets	3–2	Gooden (11–3)	Sanderson (3–3)		36,730	35–32	
68	June 26	Mets	7–3	Fontenot (2–3)	McDowell (5–3)	Smith (16)	35,876	36–32	
69	June 27	Mets	4–2	Sutcliffe (7–6)	Darling (6–2)		35,857	37–32	
70	June 28	@ Pirates	5–0	Trout (7–3)	DeLeón (2–10)		16,432	38–32	
71	June 29	@ Pirates	6 – 5 (15)	Reuschel (5–1)	Frazier (4–2)		13,934	38–33	
72	June 30	@ Pirates	9–2	Sanderson (4–3)	Robinson (2–3)		31,384	39–33	

July (13–14)

#	Date	Opponent	Score	Win	Loss	Save	Attendance	Record	Other Info
73	July 1	@ Phillies	3–1	Fontenot (3–3)	Denny (5–6)	Smith (17)	23,091	40–33	
74	July 2	@ Phillies	11–2	Rawley (6–6)	Sutcliffe (7–7)		23,005	40–34	
75	July 3	@ Phillies	4–3	Smith (4–2)	Tekulve (4–3)		56,092	41–34	
76	July 4	Giants	6–4	Garrelts (3–3)	Trout (7–4)	Minton (2)	34,377	41–35	
77	July 5	Giants	12–6	Blue (5–2)	Sanderson (4–4)		38,766	41–36	
78	July 6	Giants	6–4	Garrelts (4–3)	Smith (4–3)	M. Davis (5)	35,902	41–37	
79	July 7	Giants	6–5	Brusstar (2–1)	M. Davis (3–6)	Smith (18)	35,663	42–37	
80	July 8	Padres	8–4	Stoddard (1–3)	Sorensen (1–2)		33,159	42–38	
81	July 9	Padres	7–3	Trout (8–4)	Show (7–6)	Frazier (1)	33,095	43–38	
82	July 10	Padres	4–3	Sanderson (5–4)	Dravecky (8–5)	Smith (19)	35,042	44–38	
83	July 11	Dodgers	3–1	Welch (3–1)	Fontenot (3–4)	Howell (9)	35,469	44–39	
84	July 12	Dodgers	7–4	Niedenfuer (4–2)	Smith (4–4)		36,029	44–40	
85	July 13	Dodgers	9–1	Valenzuela (10–8)	Gura (0–2)		34,822	44–41	
86	July 14	Dodgers	10–4	Frazier (5–2)	Honeycutt (6–8)	Brusstar (2)	34,273	45–41	
87	July 18	@ Giants	1–0	Krukow (6–7)	Frazier (5–3)		9,908	45–42	
88	July 19	@ Giants	4–3	Sorensen (2–2)	Gott (4–7)	Smith (20)	12,887	46–42	
89	July 20	@ Giants	2–1	Ruthven (4–6)	Hammaker (3–9)	Smith (21)	15,494	47–42	
90	July 21	@ Giants	2–1	Laskey (3–11)	Gura (0–3)	Minton (3)	22,073	47–43	
91	July 22	@ Padres	5–3	Meridith (1–0)	Jackson (0–1)	Smith (22)	23,873	48–43	
92	July 23	@ Padres	8–1	Sutcliffe (8–7)	Hawkins (12–3)		34,278	49–43	
93	July 24	@ Padres	4 – 3 (10)	Smith (5–4)	Stoddard (1–4)	Frazier (2)	30,175	50–43	
94	July 25	@ Dodgers	7–3	Valenzuela (12–8)	Fontenot (3–5)	Howell (10)	49,516	50–44	
95	July 26	@ Dodgers	10–0	Reuss (8–6)	Ruthven (4–7)		41,321	50–45	
96	July 27	@ Dodgers	5–4	Hershiser (11–3)	Frazier (5–4)	Howell (11)	46,092	50–46	
97	July 28	@ Dodgers	9–2	Sorensen (3–2)	Powell (0–1)	Brusstar (3)	47,571	51–46	
98	July 30	Cardinals	11–3	Kepshire (8–6)	Engel (0–1)		33,083	51–47	
99	July 31	Cardinals	5–2	Fontenot (4–5)	Andújar (17–5)	Smith (23)	31,417	52–47	

August (10–18)

#	Date	Opponent	Score	Win	Loss	Save	Attendance	Record	Other Info
100	August 1	Cardinals	9 – 8 (14)	Frazier (6–4)	Dayley (3–1)		36,164	53–47	
101	August 2	Mets	2–1	Eckersley (8–5)	Leach (1–1)	Brusstar (4)	35,419	54–47	
102	August 3	Mets	5 – 4 (10)	Orosco (3–4)	Frazier (6–5)	McDowell (9)	36,775	54–48	
103	August 4	Mets	4–1	Gooden (17–3)	Fontenot (4–6)		35,207	54–49	
104	August 5	Mets	7–2	Lynch (9–5)	Botelho (0–1)		34,167	54–50	
105	August 8	@ Cardinals	8–0	Tudor (14–8)	Sanderson (5–5)		39,203	54–51	
106	August 9	@ Mets	6–4	McDowell (6–4)	Brusstar (2–2)		44,309	54–52	
107	August 10	@ Mets	8–3	Gooden (18–3)	Fontenot (4–7)		48,306	54–53	
108	August 11	@ Mets	6–2	Lynch (10–5)	Botelho (0–2)		40,311	54–54	
109	August 12	Expos	8–7	Gumpert (1–0)	Reardon (2–5)	Smith (24)	28,195	55–54	
110	August 13	Expos	4–1	Hesketh (10–5)	Sanderson (5–6)	Reardon (30)	28,582	55–55	
111	August 14	Expos	8–7	Smith (14–4)	Sorensen (3–3)	Burke (5)	30,055	55–56	
112	August 15	Expos	7–3	Gullickson (11–8)	Engel (0–2)		29,553	55–57	
113	August 16	Phillies	6–5	Smith (6–4)	Tekulve (4–8)		31,557	56–57	
114	August 17	Phillies	10–4	Denny (8–9)	Sorensen (3–4)		31,421	56–58	
115	August 18	Phillies	9–5	Hudson (6–11)	Baller (0–1)	Tekulve (13)	31,269	56–59	
116	August 20	@ Braves	5–2	Fontenot (5–7)	Sutter (7–6)	Smith (25)	13,006	57–59	
117	August 21	@ Braves	9–5	Brusstar (3–2)	Garber (3–4)	Smith (26)	12,245	58–59	
118	August 22	@ Braves	3–2	Meridith (2–0)	Camp (2–6)	Smith (27)	11,273	59–59	
119	August 23	@ Reds	3–2	Franco (11–1)	Sorensen (3–5)		34,283	59–60	
120	August 24	@ Reds	4–0	Frazier (7–5)	Soto (10–15)	Smith (28)	37,069	60–60	
121	August 25	@ Reds	5–3	Browning (13–9)	Brusstar (3–3)	Franco (7)	35,038	60–61	
122	August 26	@ Astros	10–4	Engel (1–2)	Knepper (10–10)		9,557	61–61	
123	August 27	@ Astros	11–4	Smith (7–5)	Meridith (2–1)		10,810	61–62	
124	August 28	@ Astros	3–0	Ryan (9–11)	Baller (0–2)	Heathcock (1)	6,979	61–63	
125	August 29	Braves	9–6	Mahler (17–12)	Sorensen (3–6)	Camp (2)	16,965	61–64	
126	August 30	Braves	8–1	Johnson (2–0)	Fontenot (5–8)		15,920	61–65	
127	August 31	Braves	5 – 4 (11)	Brusstar (4–3)	Garber (5–5)		31,876	62–65	

September (12–16)

#	Date	Opponent	Score	Win	Loss	Save	Attendance	Record	Other Info
128	September 1	Braves	15–2	Botelho (1–2)	Barker (2–7)		31,427	63–65	
129	September 2	Astros	7–2	Dawley (3–2)	Baller (0–3)		26,620	63–66	
130	September 3	Astros	8 – 7 (10)	Smith (8–5)	Frazier (7–6)		11,306	63–67	
131	September 4	Astros	11–6	Scott (15–7)	Meridith (2–2)		9,136	63–68	
132	September 5	@ Cardinals	6–1	Cox (15–8)	Engel (1–3)		33,693	63–69	
133	September 6	Reds	7–5	Soto (12–15)	Botelho (1–3)		17,026	63–70	
134	September 7	Reds	9–7	Baller (1–3)	Franco (11–2)		30,300	64–70	
135	September 8	Reds	5–5	Game called (darkness) (game was not made up, tie does not count in record)			28,269	64–70	
136	September 9	@ Cardinals	3–1	Fontenot (6–8)	Kepshire (10–9)	Meridith (1)	32,808	65–70	
137	September 10	@ Pirates	2–1	Reuschel (12–7)	Engel (1–4)		3,133	65–71	
138	September 11	@ Pirates	3–1	Meridith (3–2)	DeLeon (2–17)	Baller (1)	5,432	66–71	
139	September 12	@ Pirates	10–2	Rhoden (9–13)	Eckersley (8–6)	Robinson (3)	3,439	66–72	
140	September 13	Cardinals	9–3	Forsch (7–6)	Trout (8–5)	Worrell (1)	16,110	66–73	
141	September 14	Cardinals	5–4	Campbell (5–3)	Sorensen (3–7)	Lahti (17)	29,852	66–74	
142	September 15	Cardinals	5–1	Cox (16–9)	Engel (1–5)		28,430	66–75	
143	September 16	@ Expos	8–5	Burke (9–3)	Frazier (7–7)		10,399	66–76	
144	September 17	@ Expos	3–0	Eckersley (9–6)	Youmans (3–3)	Smith (29)	12,095	67–76	
145	September 18	@ Mets	4–2	Aguilera (8–6)	Trout (8–6)	McDowell (15)	25,424	67–77	
146	September 19	@ Mets	5–1	Fernandez (7–9)	Fontenot (6–9)		26,812	67–78	
147	September 20	@ Phillies	3–1	Patterson (1–0)	Hudson (7–12)	Smith (30)	20,207	68–78	
148	September 21	@ Phillies	9–2	Abrego (1–0)	K. Gross (14–11)		17,779	69–78	
149	September 22	@ Phillies	9–2	Eckersley (10–6)	Rawley (12–8)		21,768	70–78	
150	September 23	Expos	10–7	St. Claire (5–3)	Frazier (7–8)	Burke (8)	4,647	70–79	
151	September 24	Expos	17–15	Smith (17–5)	Fontenot (6–10)	Reardon (36)	6,947	70–80	
152	September 25	Mets	5–4	Smith (7–4)	Orosco (6–6)		10,339	71–80	
153	September 26	Mets	3–0	Gooden (23–4)	Abrego (1–1)		11,091	71–81	
154	September 27	Phillies	9–7	Baller (2–3)	Tekulve (4–10)	Smith (31)	9,258	72–81	
155	September 28	Phillies	11–10	Eckersley (11–6)	Denny (11–13)	Smith (32)	27,875	73–81	
156	September 29	Phillies	6–2	Trout (9–6)	Toliver (0–3)		26,641	74–81	

October (3–3)

#	Date	Opponent	Score	Win	Loss	Save	Attendance	Record	Other Info
157	October 1	Pirates	4–3	Patterson (2–0)	Reuschel (14–8)	Smith (33)	3,446	75–81	
158	October 2	Pirates	9–4	Rhoden (10–14)	Sutcliffe (8–8)	Guante (5)	4,637	75–82	
159	October 3	Pirates	13–5	Perlman (1–0)	Winn (3–6)	Engel (1)	7,437	76–82	
160	October 4	@ Cardinals	4–2	Forsch (9–6)	Eckersley (11–7)	Worrell (5)	40,618	76–83	
161	October 5	@ Cardinals	7–1	Tudor (21–8)	Trout (9–7)		44,825	76–84	
162	October 6	@ Cardinals	8–2	Patterson (3–0)	Andújar (21–12)		43,665	77–84	

== Player stats ==
=== Batting ===
==== Starters by position ====
Note: Pos = Position; G = Games played; AB = At bats; H = Hits; Avg. = Batting average; HR = Home runs; RBI = Runs batted in

Pos	Player	G	AB	H	Avg.	HR	RBI
C	Jody Davis	142	482	112	.232	17	58
1B	Leon Durham	153	542	153	.282	21	75
2B	Ryne Sandberg	153	609	186	.305	26	83
SS	Shawon Dunston	74	250	65	.260	4	18
3B	Ron Cey	145	500	116	.232	22	63
LF	Gary Matthews	97	298	70	.235	13	40
CF	Bob Dernier	121	469	119	.254	1	21
RF	Keith Moreland	161	587	180	.307	14	106

==== Other batters ====
Note: G = Games played; AB = At bats; H = Hits; Avg. = Batting average; HR = Home runs; RBI = Runs batted in

Player	G	AB	H	Avg.	HR	RBI
Davey Lopes	99	275	78	.284	11	44
Chris Speier	106	218	53	.243	4	24
Larry Bowa	72	195	48	.246	0	13
Thad Bosley	108	180	59	.328	7	27
Billy Hatcher	53	163	40	.245	2	10
Richie Hebner	83	120	26	.217	3	22
Steve Lake	58	119	18	.151	1	11
Gary Woods	81	82	20	.244	0	4
Brian Dayett	22	26	6	.231	1	4
Dave Owen	22	19	7	.368	0	4
Chico Walker	21	12	1	.083	0	0
Darrin Jackson	5	11	1	.091	0	0

=== Pitching ===
==== Starting pitchers ====
Note: G = Games pitched; IP = Innings pitched; W = Wins; L = Losses; ERA = Earned run average; SO = Strikeouts

Player	G	IP	W	L	ERA	SO
Dennis Eckersley	25	169.1	11	7	3.08	117
Steve Trout	24	140.2	9	7	3.39	44
Rick Sutcliffe	20	130.0	8	8	3.18	102
Scott Sanderson	19	121.0	5	6	3.12	80
Steve Engel	11	51.2	1	5	5.57	29

==== Other pitchers ====
Note: G = Games pitched; IP = Innings pitched; W = Wins; L = Losses; ERA = Earned run average; SO = Strikeouts

Player	G	IP	W	L	ERA	SO
Ray Fontenot	38	154.2	6	10	4.36	70
Dick Ruthven	20	87.1	4	7	4.53	26
Jay Baller	20	52.0	2	3	3.46	31
Derek Botelho	11	44.0	1	3	5.32	23
Reggie Patterson	8	39.0	3	0	3.00	17
Johnny Abrego	6	24.0	1	1	6.38	13
Larry Gura	5	20.1	0	3	8.41	7

==== Relief pitchers ====
Note: G = Games pitched; W = Wins; L = Losses; SV = Saves; ERA = Earned run average; SO = Strikeouts

Player	G	W	L	SV	ERA	SO
Lee Smith	65	7	4	33	3.04	112
George Frazier	51	7	8	2	6.39	46
Warren Brusstar	51	4	3	4	6.05	34
Lary Sorensen	45	3	7	0	4.26	34
Ron Meridith	32	3	2	1	4.47	23
Dave Beard	9	0	0	0	6.39	4
Dave Gumpert	9	1	0	0	3.48	4
Jon Perlman	6	1	0	0	11.42	4

== Farm system ==
Level	Team	League	Manager
AAA	Iowa Cubs	American Association	Larry Cox
AA	Pittsfield Cubs	Eastern League	Tom Spencer
A	Winston-Salem Spirits	Carolina League	Cal Emery
A	Peoria Chiefs	Midwest League	Pete Mackanin
Short-Season A	Geneva Cubs	New York–Penn League	Tony Franklin
Rookie	Wytheville Cubs	Appalachian League	Ramón Conde

LEAGUE CHAMPIONS: Winston-Salem
