= Mike Capel =

American baseball player (born 1961)

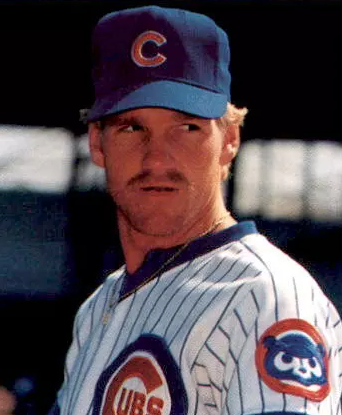
- Capel c. 1987
- Pitcher
- Born: October 13, 1961 (age 64); Marshall, Texas, U.S.
- Batted: Right Threw: Right

MLB debut
- May 7, 1988, for the Chicago Cubs

Last MLB appearance
- August 14, 1991, for the Houston Astros

MLB statistics
- Win–loss record: 3–4
- Earned run average: 4.62
- Strikeouts: 43
- Stats at Baseball Reference

Teams
- Chicago Cubs (1988); Milwaukee Brewers (1990); Houston Astros (1991)

Michael Lee Capel (born October 13, 1961) is an American professional baseball player who was a pitcher in Major League Baseball (MLB) for the Chicago Cubs, the Milwaukee Brewers, and the Houston Astros. In 49 career games, Capel pitched 62 1/3 innings, struck out 43 batters, and had a career win–loss record of 3–4 with a 4.62 earned run average (ERA). While he played in MLB, Capel stood at 6 feet 1 inch (185 cm) and weighed 175 pounds (79 kg). A starting pitcher in college and parts of his Minor League Baseball career, he converted to relief pitching while in Chicago's minor league system.

The Philadelphia Phillies chose Capel in the 24th round of the 1980 MLB draft, but the 18-year-old did not sign with the team; instead, he opted to attend the University of Texas. Capel played on the 1982 USA College All-Star Team, which competed in the Amateur World Series in Seoul and placed third. The next year, Capel and the Texas Longhorns won the College World Series. After he was drafted by the Cubs, Capel left Texas and signed to play professional baseball; he played in six seasons of Minor League Baseball before he made his MLB debut in 1988. Capel spent the entire 1989 season in Triple-A, one level below the majors, but the Cubs released him at the end of the year. He agreed to terms with the Brewers and played in MLB after an injury opened a spot on Milwaukee's roster, but was again released at the end of the season. A free agent, the Astros signed Capel, and over the course of the season he pitched in 25 games for the team. He spent the final part of his career in the Astros farm system, and after he made the 1992 Triple-A All-Star team, Capel played his last season in 1993. After retirement, Capel worked as the general manager of a car dealership in Houston, Texas.

== Early life ==
Capel was born on October 13, 1961, in Marshall, Texas, and attended Spring High School in Harris County. As a child, he watched the Astros play on weekends. During his senior year in 1979, the Spring Lions won the AAAA conference state championship, and Capel was named to the All-State team, composed of the best high school players in the state. He set several pitching records at Spring High School. Future teammate Calvin Schiraldi called Capel a "hard thrower when he came out of high school" and "the top guy out of the state in 1980"; Roger Clemens said he was "probably the best pitcher in the state at that time". The Philadelphia Phillies drafted Capel with the 605th overall pick in the 1980 MLB Draft, and offered him $45,000 (equivalent to $150,000 in 2025) to sign. Instead of signing with the Phillies, he chose to attend the University of Texas.

== Collegiate career ==
Aside from intrateam scrimmages, Capel did not play baseball his freshman season due to a torn ligament (or stretched ligaments) in his elbow. Capel pitched sidearm for the remainder of his collegiate career to compensate for a loss in the velocity of his fastball. In 1982, he was named to the All-Southwest Conference team and pitched to a 9–0 win–loss record with a 3.68 ERA, as the Longhorns finished 59–6. In the 1982 College World Series, Texas defeated the Oklahoma State Cowboys and the Stanford Cardinal, but losses to the Miami Hurricanes and the Wichita State Shockers eliminated them from play, per the tournament's double-elimination format. Capel played on the United States team in the 1982 Amateur World Series, overseen by the International Baseball Federation. Starting against Australia, he pitched a 14–4 complete game victory, with the match ending after seven innings per the championship's ten-run rule. The United States eventually placed third in the competition.

The 1983 Longhorns finished the regular season with a 61–14 record and were ranked as the number one team in the nation by Collegiate Baseball Magazine. That season, the Texas team featured four future MLB pitchers: Capel, Clemens, Bruce Ruffin, and Schiraldi. In the 1983 College World Series, Capel allowed four hits in a complete game against the Michigan Wolverines as the Longhorns advanced to the World Series finals. Facing the Alabama Crimson Tide, the Longhorns made Clemens their starting pitcher and won 4–3. The championship was the fourth World Series title in University of Texas history, and their first since 1975. Capel finished the season with a 13–1 record and a 2.98 ERA. As of 2018, his career winning percentage (.957) ties him with Rick Burley for the fifth-best in Texas Longhorns history (with a minimum of ten decisions). In June, before the College World Series, he was drafted by the Cubs with the 320th overall pick in the 1983 MLB draft.

== Professional career ==
=== Chicago Cubs ===
After he signed a professional contract with the Cubs, Capel no longer threw sidearmed. Capel began professional baseball with the Double-A Midland Cubs, but was demoted to the Class A Quad Cities Cubs after pitching to a 1–1 record with a 6.91 ERA in Double-A. Now in Single-A, Capel recorded a 3–2 record with a 2.42 ERA and a 1.03 walks plus hits per inning pitched rate. In 1984, Capel split playing time between the Class A-Advanced Lodi Crushers and Midland; he led Midland in losses (10) and wild pitches (11) and had the second-worst ERA (6.31) on the team. With Midland, Capel started 11 games out of the 16 in which he appeared. On his 0–7 record for the Crushers, Tom Alexander of the Lodi News-Sentinel wrote that Capel's luck "has been all bad when it comes to wins". Both Lodi and Midland finished their seasons with losing records.

From 1985 to 1986, he played for the Double-A Pittsfield Cubs of the Eastern League. In 1986, Capel only pitched in relief, had a career-best 1.87 ERA over 62 2/3 innings pitched, and led his team with 13 saves. After he was promoted to the Triple-A Iowa Cubs, Capel split time between starting and relieving roles in 1987. At 7–10, Capel tied for Iowa's lead in wins and losses, and led the team in strikeouts, with 75; his seven wins became a career high, and his loss total matched a career high set in Midland three years earlier. After the season, Ray Sons of the Chicago Sun-Times said Capel "may be ready for middle relief in Chicago", and Dave van Dyck listed him as a prospect for the 1988 season. During winter, Capel, Greg Maddux, Manny Trillo, Damon Berryhill, and several other Cubs played for teams in the Caribbean. Capel played for the Águilas del Zulia of Venezuela and led the team with five saves.

"Honestly, it doesn't feel that good. I didn't deserve the win. If I would have done my job, it would have been Al [Nipper]'s win. I never dreamed my first win would be like that."

— Mike Capel on his first career MLB win

Capel played in spring training ball as he tried to make Chicago's opening day roster. After the Cubs acquired Mike Bielecki from the Pittsburgh Pirates on March 31, 1988, they assigned Capel to Triple-A despite a Sun-Times prediction that he would be on the MLB roster. Prior to the acquisition, when Al Nipper was supposed to become the Cubs' fifth starter, Capel was to take his spot in the bullpen. The Cubs recalled Capel and Mark Grace to the majors on May 3, while Drew Hall and Rolando Roomes were optioned to Iowa; at the time, he had a 1.54 ERA and two saves in Triple-A ball. On May 7, Capel made his MLB debut: he pitched the final 1 2/3 innings of a game against the San Francisco Giants, allowing no runs and no hits but issuing a walk in a 2–1 Cubs loss. His first career win came the following day against the Giants, although he blew a save by giving up a two-run home run to Bob Brenly and lost a 5–4 lead. The Cubs ultimately won 13–7. Capel continued to pitch for the club until June 30, when the Cubs optioned him to Iowa to open a roster spot for Rich "Goose" Gossage to come off the 15-day disabled list (DL).

He returned to the MLB club on August 8 to replace Schiraldi, but was demoted on August 13 before making an appearance, as Chicago activated Les Lancaster from the DL. Capel rejoined the club on August 31, and pitched in five more games before the season's end. Over his first MLB season, Capel pitched in 20 games and allowed 16 earned runs over 29 1/3 innings for a 4.91 ERA. He pitched the entire 1989 season for Iowa, appearing in 64 games for the team. On October 15, Capel was granted free agency by the Cubs; he signed with the Brewers two months later.

=== Milwaukee Brewers ===
Capel competed against 22 other pitchers for an MLB roster spot in the Brewers' spring training camp. The Brewers optioned Capel to their Triple-A affiliate, the Denver Zephyrs, on April 5, before the start of Milwaukee's 1990 season. On May 17, Denver placed Capel on the DL with a strained Achilles tendon, which opened a roster spot on the Zephyrs and allowed the Brewers to send Jaime Navarro back to Denver. When the Brewers needed a replacement for the injured Bill Wegman, Capel was called up to the major leagues. For his Brewers debut, Capel faced five batters and allowed four runs (two charged to Capel) against the Baltimore Orioles. His strikeout of Billy Ripken was the only MLB out Capel recorded in 1990. On June 8, he made his second and final outing with the Brewers and allowed four runs (three charged to Capel) against the Toronto Blue Jays; combined, batters hit .857 against Capel as he finished the season with a 135.00 ERA. When Greg Vaughn, returning from a turf toe injury and a sprained left ankle, was activated from the DL on June 11, Capel was sent to Triple-A. He finished the season with Denver where he had a 4–3 record with a 4.26 ERA. On October 4, the Brewers granted Capel free agency; he signed with the Astros on January 5, 1991.

=== Houston Astros ===
"All I want is another chance. I'm not a flashy pitcher. I'm not outstanding. But I have knowledge for the game and I respond to pressure situations. Too often teams look at a pitcher's velocity, his size and what round he was taken when they consider signing him. They don't look at you as a person. I'm looking for that chance to meet someone who would recognize me as a pitcher who has the right makeup. I believe I can be an asset to any club."

— Mike Capel on his 1992 season

By 1991, Capel threw four pitches: a fastball, a forkball, a slider, and occasionally a curveball. He began his 1991 season with the Triple-A Tucson Toros; the Astros added Capel to their MLB roster on June 7. Two days later, against the New York Mets, Capel allowed the game-winning home run to Howard Johnson in the top of the 11th inning. Against the Mets on June 14, Capel, starting pitcher Pete Harnisch, and closer Jim Clancy combined for a four-hitter. His final MLB appearance came on August 14 against the San Diego Padres, when he pitched one inning in relief of Jim Corsi in a 4–1 loss. Capel said pitching for Houston was "the high point of [his] career". Over 25 games pitched, Capel finished the season with a 1–3 record and a 3.03 ERA.

To reduce their roster to 35 players, the Astros assigned Capel and seven others to the Toros prior to the 1992 MLB season. Capel was selected to the Triple-A All-Star Game to replace Tim Scott, whom the Padres promoted to MLB. He told Javier Morales of the Arizona Daily Star "this [was] one of the greatest thrills of [his] career," and that he hoped it showed the Astros he could pitch in MLB. Doug Jones worked as Houston's closer in 1992, however, and Capel never played for the MLB club. For the Toros, Capel had a 6–6 record and a 2.19 ERA with a team-leading 18 saves.

The following season, the Montreal Expos invited Capel to their spring camp as a non-roster invitee. Capel elected to remain with the Astros organization where he allowed 26 earned runs in 32 2/3 innings and pitched the entire season in Triple-A. The Toros, managed by Rick Sweet, finished first in the Pacific Coast League (PCL) South Division with an 83–60 record and made the playoffs. Unlike the 1993 MLB playoffs, in which four teams competed, only two teams could make the PCL playoffs. In the championship series, the Toros faced the Portland Beavers, champions of the North Division and holders of a PCL-best 87–56 record. In a best-of-seven series, the Toros defeated the Beavers four games to two. After the season, the Astros did not re-sign Capel. While playing in MLB, Capel stood at 6 feet 1 inch (185 cm) and weighed 175 pounds (79 kg).

== Personal life ==
In February 1986, Capel pitched in the University of Texas Alumni v. Varsity game, which ended in a 14–14 tie. Capel started to use dipping tobacco in 1976 and in March 1988 had a non-cancerous lesion removed from his lip; he tried to quit the product in March 1988. Capel met his wife, Elizabeth, at Roger Clemens' wedding. Outside of baseball, he is a close friend of Clemens, and during Clemens' 2012 perjury trial, Capel testified on his work ethic and character. In 2012, Mike worked as the general manager of a car dealership in Houston. Capel's son, Conner, played baseball as an outfielder for Seven Lakes High School in Katy, Texas, where he had a .456 batting average with 23 stolen bases and 36 runs scored in his senior year. The Cleveland Indians drafted Conner in the fifth round of the 2016 MLB draft.
