= Pittsfield Cubs =

- 1985–1988; Pittsfield, Massachusetts

Minor league affiliations
- Previous classes: Class AA
- League: Eastern League

Major league affiliations
- Previous teams: Chicago Cubs (1985-1988)

Team data
- Previous names: Pittsfield Cubs (1985-1988)
- Previous parks: Wahconah Park (1985-1988)

The Pittsfield Cubs, located in Pittsfield, Massachusetts, were a minor league baseball team that played in the Eastern League from 1985 to 1988. They played their home games at Wahconah Park and were affiliated with the Chicago Cubs.

== History ==
The Cubs were founded in 1985 after an investment group acquired the Double-A franchise rights for $350,000 from the Buffalo Bisons.

On the field, the Cubs were successful, making the playoffs in three of four years. In 1987, the team finished first during the regular season, although they failed to win the championship. In addition to Eastern League all-star selections, the team had two Eastern League Most Valuable Players, Rafael Palmeiro in 1986 and Mark Grace in 1987. The team also had two no-hitters during their existence. On August 1, 1985, Johnny Abrego threw a no-hitter against the Nashua Pirates winning by a 1-0 score. On July 18, 1988, Kris Roth pitched a no-hitter against the Harrisburg Senators, winning by a 3-0 score.

Off the field, the Cubs were plagued by attendance problems. They finished last or next to last in Eastern league attendance during each of their four years of existence.

== Season-by-season record ==
Season	Class	League	Affiliation	Manager	Record	Finish	Attendance	Postseason
1985	AA	Eastern	Chicago Cubs	Tom Spenser	59-79	7th	60,585	-
1986	AA	Eastern	Chicago Cubs	Tom Spenser	76-64	3rd	47,709	Lost to Vermont in first round 3-2
1987	AA	Eastern	Chicago Cubs	Jim Essian	87-51	1st	51,551	Lost to Vermont in first round 3-1
1988	AA	Eastern	Chicago Cubs	Jim Essian	75-63	3rd	53,121	Lost to Vermont in first round 3-1

== Legacy ==
The Pittsfield Cubs moved to Williamsport, Pennsylvania after the 1988 season, becoming the Williamsport Bills and affiliating with the Seattle Mariners. The community of Pittsfield gained the Pittsfield Mets for the 1989 season. The Chicago Cubs transferred their AA level affiliation to the Charlotte Knights.

== Future Major League Pittsfield Cubs ==
- Johnny Abrego (1985)
- Mike Brumley (1985)
- Mike Capel (1985-1986)
- Steve Engel (1985)
- Darrin Jackson (1985-1986)
- Jamie Moyer (1985)
- Gary Varsho (1985-1986)
- Rich Amaral (1986-1988)
- Damon Berryhill (1986)
- Drew Hall (1986)
- Les Lancaster (1986)
- Greg Maddux (1986)
- Mike Martin (1986)
- Paul Noce (1986)
- Rafael Palmeiro (1986)
- Rolando Roomes (1986-1987)
- Phil Stephenson (1986)
- Doug Dascenzo (1987)
- Mark Grace (1987)
- Dave Pavlas (1987)
- Jeff Pico (1987)
- Laddie Renfroe (1987-1988)
- Rich Scheid (1987-1988)
- Dwight Smith (1987)
- Héctor Villanueva (1987-1988)
- Rick Wrona (1987-1988)
- Jim Bullinger (1988)
- Joe Girardi (1988)
- Mike Harkey (1988)
- Joe Kraemer (1988)
- Ced Landrum (1988)
- Kelly Mann (1988)
- Jeff Schwarz (1988)
- Jerome Walton (1988)
- Dean Wilkins (1988)

== Pittsfield Cubs with previous Major League experience ==
- Jeff Cornell (1985)
- Steve Hammond (1985)
- Jeff Jones (1985)
- Dickie Noles (1987)
- Al Chambers (1988)

== Eastern League All-Stars ==
- First Base: Phil Stephenson (1986), Mark Grace (1987)
- Shortstop: Mike Brumley (1985), Paul Noce (1986)
- Outfield: Rafael Palmeiro (1986), Dwight Smith (1987), Jerome Walton (1988)
- Pitcher: Dean Wilkins (1988)

== Eastern League Season Leaders ==
=== Pitching ===
- Winning Percentage: .813 (13-3), David Masters (1987)
  .818 (9-2) Michael Harkey (1988)

=== Hitting ===
- Batting Average: .331, Jerome Walton (1988)
- Runs: 87, Paul Noce (1986)
  111, Dwight Smith (1987)
  82, Ced Landrum (1988)
- Hits: 156, Rafael Palmeiro (1986)
- Runs Batted In: 95, Rafael Palmeiro (1986)
  101, Mark Grace (1987)
