= Brian Dayett =

American baseball player (1957–2025)

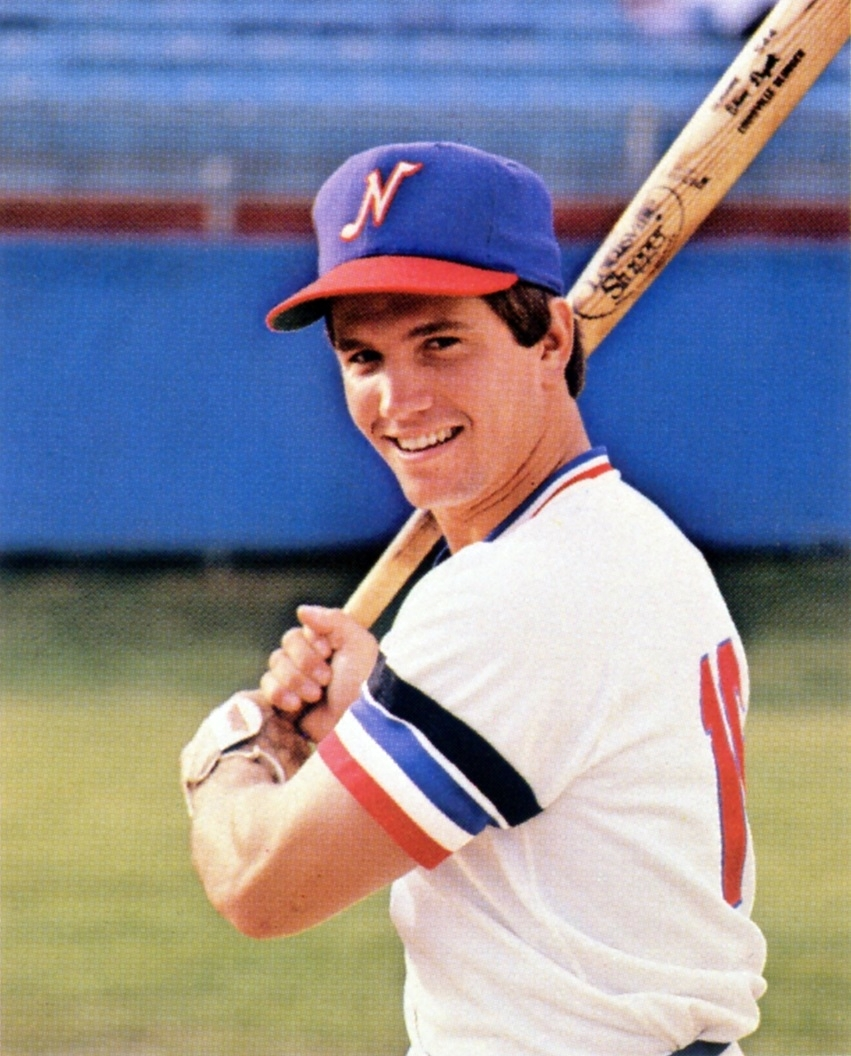
- Dayett with the Nashville Sounds in 1980
- Outfielder
- Born: January 22, 1957; New London, Connecticut, U.S.
- Died: September 7, 2025 (aged 68); Winchester, Tennessee, U.S.
- Batted: Right Threw: Right

Professional debut
- MLB: September 11, 1983, for the New York Yankees
- NPB: April 20, 1988, for the Nippon-Ham Fighters

Last appearance
- MLB: October 3, 1987, for the Chicago Cubs
- NPB: June 25, 1991, for the Nippon-Ham Fighters

MLB statistics
- Batting average: .258
- Home runs: 14
- Runs batted in: 68

NPB statistics
- Batting average: .268
- Home runs: 21
- Runs batted in: 66
- Stats at Baseball Reference

Teams
- New York Yankees (1983–1984); Chicago Cubs (1985–1987); Nippon-Ham Fighters (1988–1991)

Brian Kelly Dayett (January 22, 1957 – September 7, 2025) was an American Major League Baseball (MLB) outfielder who played five seasons between 1983 and 1987 for the New York Yankees and Chicago Cubs. He also spent some time in Japan, playing for the Nippon-Ham Fighters of Nippon Professional Baseball (NPB) from 1988 until 1991.

== Early life ==
Brian Kelly Dayett was born in New London, Connecticut, on January 22, 1957. He was raised in Deep River, Connecticut. Deep River has since named their Little League Baseball program for him. After graduating from Valley Regional High School, he played baseball for two seasons for Saint Leo College, batting .311 as a sophomore and .381 as a junior. In 2019, Dayett was inducted into the Saint Leo University Athletic Hall of Fame.

== Playing career ==
=== New York Yankees ===
Dayett was drafted by the New York Yankees in the 16th round (416th overall) in the 1978 amateur entry draft. He began his first season in professional baseball that summer with the Oneonta Yankees of the Class A-Short Season New York–Penn League. Batting .309, he hit 11 home runs and co-led the league with 20 doubles in 68 games. He hit .256 for the Double-A West Haven Yankees of the Eastern League in 1979. He began the 1980 season at Double-A for the Nashville Sounds in the Southern League. After being hit by a pitch in the face, he spent the rest of the season between the Class A Alexandria Dukes, a co-op team in the Carolina League, and the Yankees' Class A affiliate in the Florida State League, the Fort Lauderdale Yankees. Across all three teams, he batted .264.

Dayett returned to Double-A Nashville in 1981, batting .269 with 18 home runs. Again with the Sounds in 1982, he led the league with a .532 slugging percentage while he hit .280 with 34 home runs. He propelled Nashville to win the Southern League championship with a two-out, bottom-of-the-thirteenth-inning walk-off home run scoring Buck Showalter. That season, he was selected for the Southern League All-Star Game, named to the postseason All-Star team, and won the league MVP award.

In 1983, he led the International League with 35 home runs and 108 runs batted in for the Triple-A Columbus Clippers. He was called up to the Yankees after the season.

Dayett made his major league debut at Yankee Stadium on September 11, 1983, at the age of 26, appearing as a pinch hitter for Omar Moreno. He collected a hit in his first at-bat off of the Baltimore Orioles' Mike Flanagan. He ended up hitting .207 in 11 games that year. He began the 1984 season in Columbus, where he hit .304, but was called up to New York in June, hitting .244 with the Yankees.

=== Chicago Cubs ===
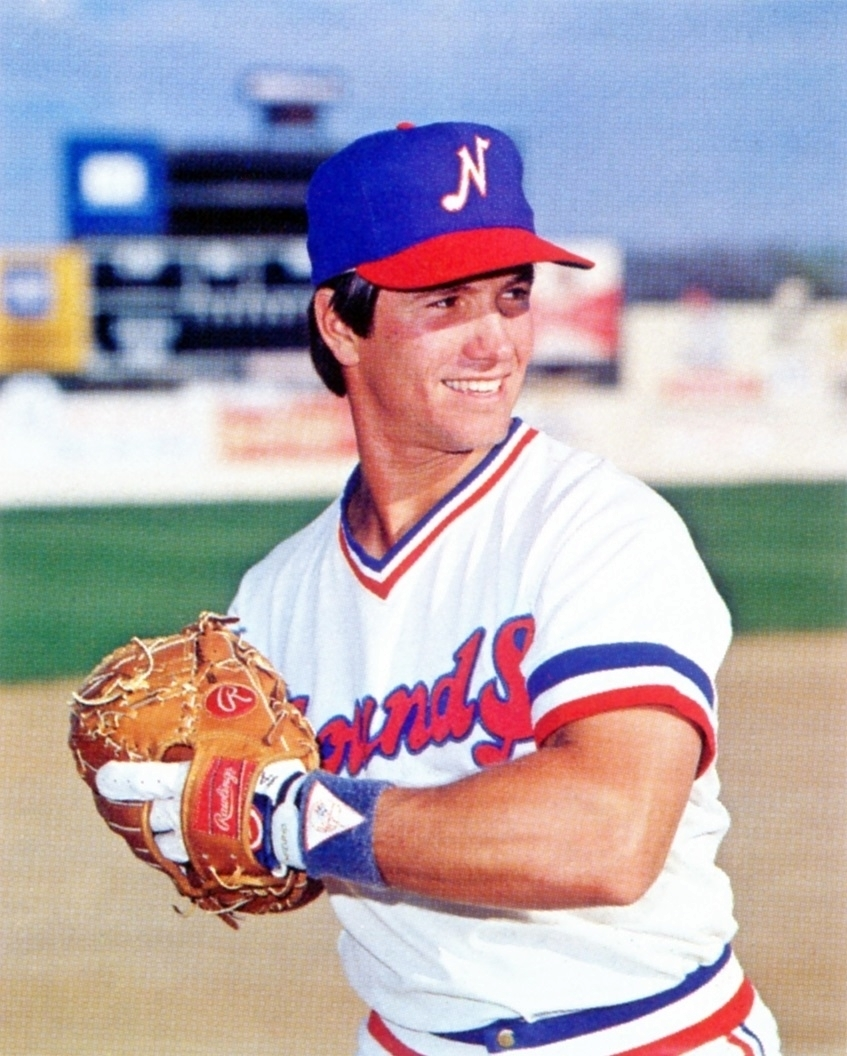
Dayett in 1981

Dayett was traded along with Ray Fontenot from the Yankees to the Chicago Cubs for Henry Cotto, Ron Hassey, Rich Bordi, and Porfi Altamirano at the Winter Meetings on December 4, 1984. Dayett was pleased with the trade, because he had not been playing everyday with the Yankees, but he wound up being used as a platoon player in Chicago, as well. He split the 1985 season between the Cubs and the Triple-A Iowa Cubs in the Pacific Coast League. He hit .378 in 17 games with Iowa and .231 in 22 games with Chicago. He spent the majority of the 1986 season at Triple-A, where he batted .281 with 19 home runs in 121 games. In 24 games with the big league club, Dayett batted .269. He looked to be slated to be the Cubs' starting right fielder for the 1987 season, but Andre Dawson, signed by the Cubs as a free agent, filled that position instead.

=== Nippon Ham Fighters ===
On October 28, 1987, Dayett's contract was purchased by the Nippon Ham Fighters of the Japan Pacific League. He played four seasons with the club, mostly in a reserve role. With the exception of the 1989 season, in which he played 89 games, he never made more than two dozen appearances in a season. At 35 years old, Dayett retired after the 1991 campaign.

Dayett was mostly used as a pinch hitter and defensive replacement. In 218 MLB games across five seasons, he hit 14 home runs and 26 doubles in 426 at-bats, with a .258 batting average. He committed only one error in 221 total chances in his career for a .995 fielding percentage. On the minor league side, he played 870 games with a batting average of .280 and hit 141 home runs and 175 doubles.

== Coaching career ==
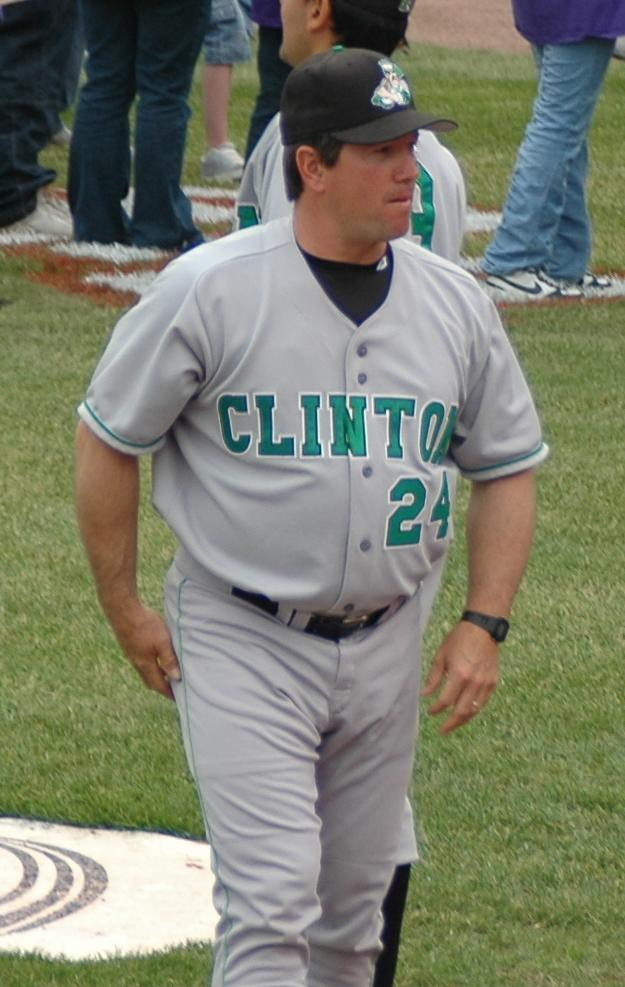
Dayett in 2005

Dayett began a coaching career in 1997, managing the Will County Cheetahs of the independent Heartland League. He managed the same club, renamed the Cook County Cheetahs, in 1998, and led them to win the league's championship. He entered the affiliated coaching ranks in 2000 when he managed the Carolina League's Winston-Salem Warthogs, the Class A-Advanced affiliate of the Chicago White Sox. The club placed fourth (last) in the Southern Division with a 68–71 (.489) record.

In 2002, Dayett served as hitting coach for the Michigan Battle Cats, the Class A affiliate of the Houston Astros in the Midwest League. He served in the same capacity with their Class A-Short Season Tri-City ValleyCats of the New York–Penn League in 2003. He coached Houston's hitters in the South Atlantic League (SAL) with the Class A Lexington Legends in 2004. He joined the Texas Rangers organization in 2005, serving as hitting coach for the Midwest League's Class A Clinton LumberKings though 2008. He continued in the same role with the SAL's Hickory Crawdads in 2009 and the Northwest League (Class A) Spokane Indians in 2010 and 2011. From 2012 to 2014, he was a roving Special Assignment Coach in the Rangers organization.

Following the resignation of Rangers manager Ron Washington in early September 2014, Dayett filled a vacancy on the Rangers' coaching staff for the rest of the season.

== Personal life and death ==
After retiring from baseball he lived in Winchester, Tennessee, with his wife and two sons.

Dayett was diagnosed with Parkinson's disease in 2000. He died from complications of the disease at his home in Winchester on September 7, 2025, at the age of 68.
