= Steve Trout =

American baseball player (born 1957)

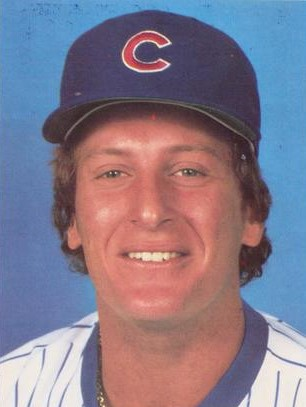
- Pitcher
- Born: July 30, 1957 (age 69); Detroit, Michigan, U.S.
- Batted: Left Threw: Left

MLB debut
- July 1, 1978, for the Chicago White Sox

Last MLB appearance
- June 5, 1989, for the Seattle Mariners

MLB statistics
- Win–loss record: 88–92
- Earned run average: 4.18
- Strikeouts: 656
- Stats at Baseball Reference

Teams
- Chicago White Sox (1978–1982); Chicago Cubs (1983–1987); New York Yankees (1987); Seattle Mariners (1988–1989)

Steven Russell Trout (born July 30, 1957) is an American former professional baseball pitcher who played Major League Baseball (MLB) during the 1980s.

He is the son of former MLB pitcher Dizzy Trout. He had the nickname "Rainbow".

== Playing career ==
=== Chicago White Sox ===
After attending Thornwood High School in South Holland, Illinois, Trout was drafted by the Chicago White Sox in the first round of the 1976 MLB draft. He played three years in the minor leagues before joining the White Sox and pitching in his first MLB game on July 1, 1978, against the Minnesota Twins.

=== Chicago Cubs ===
Before the 1983 season, Trout was traded to the Chicago Cubs along with Warren Brusstar for Scott Fletcher, Pat Tabler, Randy Martz, and Dick Tidrow. Trout had 32 starts in his first season with the Cubs, going 10–14 with a 4.65 ERA.

The following season in 1984, he stayed in the Cubs rotation, pitching along with Rick Sutcliffe, Dennis Eckersley, and Lee Smith. They led the Cubs to 96 victories and their first trip to the playoffs in 39 years. Trout pitched the Cubs home opener on April 13 against the New York Mets, pitching a complete game and allowing just two hits in the 11–2 victory. On May 30, Trout took a no-hitter into the eighth inning against the Atlanta Braves that was broken up by Albert Hall. Trout finished the season with a 13–7 record in 31 starts, posting a 3.41 ERA. He pitched effectively in the National League Championship Series against the San Diego Padres, going 8 1/3 innings for the victory in Game 2, which put the Cubs one victory away from their first World Series since 1945. He pitched in relief in the series-deciding Game 5 in San Diego, which the Cubs lost.

Trout started strong in 1985 with a 6–1 record through June 8, until ulnar nerve problems caused him to miss time on the disabled list, as he was only able to make nine starts for the remainder of the season

=== New York Yankees ===
Trout was traded in 1987 to the New York Yankees for Bob Tewksbury, Rich Scheid, and Dean Wilkins. The mid-season trade proved disastrous for the Yankees. Though his last two starts with the Cubs were complete game shutouts, and his ERA was one of the best in the National League, with the Yankees he proved unable to locate the strike zone. He walked 37 batters and threw nine wild pitches in 46 innings and lasted an average of only four innings in his nine Yankee starts. The Yankees traded Trout to Seattle after the 1987 season, paying the Mariners $1 million to offset some of Trout's substantial salary.

=== Seattle Mariners ===
Trout was traded to the Mariners before the 1988 season with Henry Cotto for Lee Guetterman, Clay Parker, and Wade Taylor. He pitched infrequently over the next season and a half before being released by the team in June 1989.

== Post-playing career ==
Trout ran a baseball clinic from his home in Venice, Florida, from November through April. It is open to all ages. In 2002, he co-authored a book about his and his father Dizzy Trout's baseball lives called Home Plate: The Journey of the Most Flamboyant Father and Son Pitching Combination in Major League History. He later co-wrote a children's illustrated book called Loosey-Goosey Baseball.

He served as pitching coach for the Brockton Rox of the Can-Am League and Chicago's Windy City ThunderBolts of the Frontier League. Trout managed of the Texarkana Gunslingers for 11 games in 2008. He later sued the team over providing inadequate security during an on-field brawl.

Moloka'i High School in Hawaii hired Trout in March 2010 to be its head coach. Trout answered an ad in the local newspaper.

Trout started the Chicago-based Trout Baseball Academy in 2015 and conducted baseball camps for children.

In 2016, Trout sued a Lincoln Park baseball camp claiming the camp unlawfully used his name in the source code of their website for monetary gains.

== See also ==
- List of second-generation Major League Baseball players
