= Rolando Roomes =

Jamaican baseball player (born 1962)

- Outfielder
- Born: February 15, 1962 (age 63); Kingston, Jamaica
- Batted: Right Threw: Right

MLB debut
- April 12, 1988, for the Chicago Cubs

Last MLB appearance
- September 30, 1990, for the Montreal Expos

MLB statistics
- Batting average: .254
- Home runs: 9
- Runs batted in: 42

Teams
- Chicago Cubs (1988); Cincinnati Reds (1989–1990); Montreal Expos (1990)

Rolando Audley Roomes (born February 15, 1962) is a Jamaican former professional baseball player. He played in Major League Baseball primarily as an outfielder from 1988 to 1990. He played for the Chicago Cubs, Cincinnati Reds, and Montreal Expos.

== Early life ==
Roomes was born in Kingston, Jamaica to Vincent and Enid Roomes. He has three brothers. Roomes played cricket as a child, then graduated to baseball after his family relocated to Bushwick, in Brooklyn, New York. He went to Beach Channel High School in Rockaway Park, where he was signed by the Chicago Cubs (on July 14, 1980) as an amateur free agent. His minor league career featured high batting average and strikeout totals. In 1987, Roomes played for the AA Pittsfield Cubs and had a .308 batting average with 135 strikeouts, and followed that up in 1988 with a .301 batting average and 134 strikeouts for the AAA Iowa Cubs.

== Major league career ==
Roomes remained in the minor leagues for 8 seasons until he made his Major league debut at age 26 on April 12, 1988 as a pinch runner for Jerry Mumphrey in a 7-5 Cubs road loss to the St. Louis Cardinals. He finished the season with 17 games played for the Cubs. On December 8, 1988, he was traded to the Cincinnati Reds for Lloyd McClendon. On May 3, 1989, the Reds called up Roomes, who remained on the major league roster for most of the season, playing 107 games and hitting .263.

In 1990 Roomes continued to struggle with strikeouts, and the Reds had acquired outfielders Billy Hatcher, then later Glenn Braggs. After hitting .213 with two home runs and seven runs RBI's in 60 plate appearances, he was released by the Reds, who went on to win the 1990 World Series. On the same day the Reds released him, June 18, 1990, he was claimed on waivers by the Montreal Expos. He appeared in 16 games for the Expos, hitting .286 in 15 plate appearances. It was his final year in the big leagues, with the Expos releasing him in December 1990. Roomes retired after the 1991, splitting time between the minor league Portland Beavers and Denver Zephyrs.
