= Wade Taylor =

American baseball player (born 1965)

Milwaukee Milkmen
- Pitcher / Coach
- Born: October 19, 1965 (age 61); Mobile, Alabama, U.S.
- Batted: Right Threw: Right

MLB debut
- June 2, 1991, for the New York Yankees

Last MLB appearance
- September 26, 1991, for the New York Yankees

MLB statistics
- Win–loss record: 7–12
- Earned run average: 6.27
- Strikeouts: 72
- Stats at Baseball Reference

Teams
- New York Yankees (1991)

Wade Eric Taylor (born October 19, 1965, in Mobile, Alabama) is an American pitching coach and former Major League Baseball pitcher who played with the New York Yankees in 1991. He has been an advance scout for the Yankees, Arizona Diamondbacks, Washington Nationals and Los Angeles Dodgers.

Taylor played college baseball at the University of Miami. He was drafted twice in 1986, first by the Toronto Blue Jays, and then by the Los Angeles Dodgers, but did not sign with either team. On June 30, 1987, Taylor was signed by the Seattle Mariners as an amateur free agent.

Taylor pitched in 12 games for Seattle's Single-A minor league affiliate, the Bellingham Mariners, in 1987.

On December 22, 1987, Taylor was traded with Lee Guetterman and Clay Parker to the New York Yankees in exchange for Henry Cotto and Steve Trout. After spending three full years in the Yankees minor league system, Taylor was called up in early June 1991. Taylor started his first game on June 2, against the Milwaukee Brewers. He pitched 5.1 innings, allowing seven hits and four earned runs. Taylor also struck out four Brewers' hitters and was credited with the win in the Yankees 7–4 defeat of Milwaukee.

In 23 games for the Yankees in 1991, Taylor posted a 7–12 win–loss record, a 6.27 earned run average, and struck out 72 batters in 116.1 innings.

On January 17, 2020, Taylor was announced as the pitching coach for the Milwaukee Milkmen of the American Association of Professional Baseball.
