= Dave Owen (baseball) =

American baseball player (born 1958)

- Shortstop
- Born: April 25, 1958 (age 68); Cleburne, Texas, U.S.
- Batted: Switch Threw: Right

MLB debut
- September 6, 1983, for the Chicago Cubs

Last MLB appearance
- October 2, 1988, for the Kansas City Royals

MLB statistics
- Batting average: .194
- Home runs: 1
- Runs batted in: 16
- Stats at Baseball Reference

Teams
- Chicago Cubs (1983–1985); Kansas City Royals (1988)

Dave Owen (born April 25, 1958) is an American former professional baseball player who played as an infielder in Major League Baseball from 1983-1988. He attended the University of Texas at Arlington and played for the Mavericks from 1977 to 1979. After getting to the major leagues, he played for the Chicago Cubs and Kansas City Royals. He provided the game-winning RBI in the bottom of the 11th during the game in which Ryne Sandberg hit two home runs off Bruce Sutter on June 23, 1984. He was traded from the Cubs to the San Francisco Giants for Manny Trillo on December 11, 1985. Owen's younger brother Spike played for five major league teams from 1983 to 1995.

== Personal life ==
Dave and his wife Yasmin have two daughters, Haley and Courtney.
