= Lee Guetterman =

American baseball player (born 1958)

- Pitcher
- Born: November 22, 1958 (age 67); Chattanooga, Tennessee, U.S.
- Batted: Left Threw: Left

MLB debut
- September 12, 1984, for the Seattle Mariners

Last MLB appearance
- July 13, 1996, for the Seattle Mariners

MLB statistics
- Win–loss record: 38–36
- Earned run average: 4.33
- Strikeouts: 287
- Stats at Baseball Reference

Teams
- Seattle Mariners (1984, 1986–1987); New York Yankees (1988–1992); New York Mets (1992); St. Louis Cardinals (1993); Seattle Mariners (1995–1996)

Arthur Lee Guetterman (born November 22, 1958), nicknamed "Goot," is an American former professional baseball pitcher who played from 1984 to 1996 for the Seattle Mariners, New York Yankees, New York Mets, and St. Louis Cardinals of Major League Baseball (MLB). A southpaw used primarily in the major leagues as a relief pitcher, he stood 6 feet 8 inches (2.03 m) tall. He led the Yankees in wins in 1990 without starting a game.

Guetterman attended Liberty University, where he set several school records on the baseball team. Drafted by the Mariners in the fourth round of the 1981 Major League Baseball (MLB) Draft, he made his major league debut in 1984, though he would not return to the major leagues until 1986. After having the highest earned run average (ERA) of any American League (AL) pitcher with at least 75 innings pitched in 1986, he won 11 games as a starter in 1987, posting an 8–1 record at one point before getting moved to the bullpen due to a loss of control of his pitches. He was traded to the Yankees after the season, and after spending much of 1988 in the minor leagues, he emerged as a part-time closer for the Yankees in 1989, while Dave Righetti was struggling. He had 13 saves in 1989, then just two the following year, though he would lead the Yankees in wins. In 1991, Guetterman became unhappy with his playing time and requested a trade, which he got in 1992, when he was part of the only Yankees-Mets trade between 1987 and 2001.

After finishing the 1992 season with the Mets, Guetterman pitched for the Cardinals in 1993, though he was in the minor leagues until June 30 that year. He had a 2.93 ERA for the Cardinals that year but did not return to the major leagues in 1994. After stints with the Mariners again in 1995 and 1996, Guetterman played one year for the Sioux Falls Canaries of the independent Northern League.

== Early life ==
Arthur Lee Guetterman was born on November 22, 1958, to Arthur Adam Jr. and Ruth Guetterman. Lee's father was a Lieutenant Commander in the United States Navy, which Art Jr. served in for 23 years. Though Art never played baseball professionally, he taught his son to pitch, building him a box mounted on wooden legs to represent a strike zone and providing him with a bucket of baseballs to practice throwing at it. Guetterman graduated from Oceanside High School in Oceanside, California, and went to Liberty University, where he was coached on the baseball team by former major league pitcher Al Worthington. During his time at Liberty, Guetterman set school records that still stood in 2010 for starts (47), innings pitched (334 2/3), wins (29), complete games (30), and shutouts (seven). As a hitter, he batted .325 with 82 runs scored, 11 home runs, and 108 runs batted in (RBI). In his senior year of 1981, he was selected as a 1st Team All-American in the National Association of Intercollegiate Athletics. That same year, the Seattle Mariners selected him in the fourth round of the Major League Baseball (MLB) Draft.

== First professional seasons (1981–85) ==
In 1981, Guetterman began his professional career with the Single-A short season Bellingham Mariners of the Northwest League. He made 13 starts for the ballclub, accumulating a 6–4 record, a 2.68 ERA, 55 strikeouts, 44 walks, and 85 hits allowed in 84 innings pitched. He joined the Bakersfield Mariners of the Single-A California League in 1982, making 26 starts and posting a 7–11 record, a 4.44 ERA, 82 strikeouts, 69 walks, and 172 hits allowed in 154 innings pitched. With Bakersfield again for the 1983 season, he made 25 starts and had a 12–6 record, a 3.22 ERA, 93 strikeouts, 45 walks, and 164 hits allowed in 156 1/3 innings.

Guetterman spent most of the 1984 season with the Double-A Chattanooga Lookouts of the Southern League, making 24 starts and posting an 11–7 record, a 3.38 ERA, 47 strikeouts, 38 walks, and 174 hits allowed in 157 innings. At the end of the year, Seattle promoted him to the major leagues as one of their September call-ups. He made his major league debut as a relief pitcher on September 12, allowing one run in 1 2/3 innings pitched in an 8–1 loss to the Texas Rangers. Guetterman would make three appearances for Seattle in 1984, allowing two runs in 4 1/3 innings. In 1985, Guetterman pitched for the Triple-A Calgary Cannons of the Pacific Coast League (PCL). He appeared in 20 games (18 starts), posting a 5–8 record, a 5.79 ERA, 48 strikeouts, 44 walks, and 138 hits allowed in 110 1/3 innings.

== First full season, use as a starter (1986–87) ==
In 1986, Guetterman made the Mariners' roster out of spring training and spent most of the season as a relief pitcher with the major league club, though he started four games for Calgary as well. Sixteen of his 41 appearances for Seattle were multiple-inning efforts, such as a game on May 11, when he pitched five scoreless innings of relief in a 4–3 loss to the Toronto Blue Jays. He started the second game of a doubleheader on June 7 and made three starts from June 28 through July 8, allowing two runs in 6 1/3 innings in an 8–5 victory over the Kansas City Royals on July 1, though Guetterman did not get the decision. In 41 games, he had an 0–4 record, 38 strikeouts, 30 walks, and 108 hits allowed in 76 innings pitched. His 7.34 ERA was the highest among American League (AL) pitchers with at least 75 innings pitched.

Not even invited to 1987 spring training, Guetterman began the season in the bullpen at Calgary, posting a 5–1 record and a 2.86 ERA in 16 appearances (two starts). Promoted by the Mariners in late May when another starter went on the disabled list, he entered a tie game against the New York Yankees in the beginning of the sixth inning on May 27, throwing two scoreless innings as the Mariners took the lead. He was removed in the eighth after walking Don Mattingly to lead off the inning, and Jerry Reed eventually allowed Mattingly to score, but the Mariners held on to win 6–5, and Guetterman was credited with the victory, his first ever in the major leagues. He then joined the starting rotation, winning his next four decisions for Seattle. In one of those, on June 26 against the Cleveland Indians, he allowed just three hits in his only major league shutout. After a loss, he won three more decisions in a row and had an 8–1 record by the All-Star break. He had a 6.29 ERA in his next six starts, losing three of four decisions, before getting moved to the bullpen. "Lee won five in a row and then lost his command,” said Billy Connors, the Mariners' pitching coach. “He seemed afraid to let the guys hit the ball. That’s trouble for a sinkerball pitcher." As a reliever, Guetterman posted a 1.69 ERA in seven outings. He made two more starts at the end of the season, winning both of them. In 25 games (17 starts), he had an 11–4 record, a 3.81 ERA, 42 strikeouts, 35 walks, and 117 hits allowed in 113 1/3 innings pitched. After the season, on December 22, he was traded to the New York Yankees with Clay Parker and Wade Taylor for Steve Trout and Henry Cotto.

== Emerging as a relief pitcher, closing, leading the Yankees in wins (1988–90) ==
Entering the 1988 season, Sarah Ballard of Sports Illustrated predicted that Guetterman would be the Yankees' fifth starter. He began the year in the bullpen, posting a 2.45 ERA in eight games. However, after May 6, he was sent to the minor leagues because Yankee manager Billy Martin thought he was not aggressive enough. Used as a starter again for the Triple-A Columbus Clippers of the International League, he made 18 appearances, posting a 9–6 record, a 2.76 ERA, 49 strikeouts, 26 walks, and 109 hits allowed in 120 2/3 innings. Recalled to the Yankees in August, he gave up five runs in a three-inning start on August 5, and he allowed six runs in 1 1/3 innings of relief on August 16, causing his ERA to rise to 5.47. He posted a 3.14 ERA after that and remained with the Yankees for the rest of the season, used mostly as a reliever. In 20 games (two starts), he had a 1–2 record, a 4.65 ERA, 15 strikeouts, 14 walks, and 49 hits allowed in 40 2/3 innings.

Expected to begin the 1989 season with the Clippers, Guetterman made the Yankee roster out of spring training because Ron Guidry suffered a left elbow injury. Then, Guetterman was manager Dallas Green's choice in April to be the Yankee closer when Dave Righetti slumped due to elbow problems. "I need a guy in that situation who’ll throw strikes and not walk people," Green said. "I have faith Goot can do that." "It's not my role," Guetterman declared. "I feel like I'm a fill-in just because I'm pitching well. Over the long haul, Dave and Lance [McCullers] are going to get the call late in games. That's their forte, what they do best." As Guetterman predicted, Righetti went on to assume the closer role and get 25 saves for the Yankees in 1989 (McCullers would only have three), but Guetterman and Righetti shared the responsibility in the early part of the year; both had eight saves through June 4. Guetterman would be unscored upon for his first 19 games of the year, pitching 29 2/3 consecutive scoreless innings before he gave up five runs to the California Angels on June 4. His ERA was 1.37 through June 17, but he had an 8.82 ERA over his next 13 games, raising his season total to 3.32 on July 26. He had a 1.11 ERA for the rest of the season to finish the year with a 2.45 mark. In 70 games (all in relief, he would never make another start in the major leagues), Guetterman had a 5–5 record, 51 strikeouts, 26 walks, and 98 hits allowed in 103 innings pitched. He had 13 saves, which would be the highest total of his career, and his 70 games pitched ranked fifth among AL relievers.

Against the Rangers on April 13, 1990, Guetterman pitched a scoreless sixth through eighth innings to help preserve a 3–0 victory. He also pitched a scoreless sixth through eighth innings on May 25, helping preserve a 6–3 victory over the Royals. Entering a tie game against the Milwaukee Brewers on June 20, he threw a scoreless eighth and ninth innings, earning the win after Roberto Kelly had hit a home run to give the Yankees the winning margin of victory in the top of the ninth. On July 7, he entered a tie game against the Minnesota Twins in the ninth inning and held the team to one hit in four innings, earning the win as the Yankees scored in the bottom of the 12th. He suffered a strained ribcage on July 18 and was placed on the disabled list the next day. Activated on August 3, he allowed two runs over 3 1/3 innings against the Indians that night but earned the win in a 6–4 victory. Relieving Mark Leiter after four innings against the Baltimore Orioles on September 24, Guetterman pitched five scoreless innings but had a no decision in an eventual 6–3, 10-inning loss. Though he did not start a single game in 1990, Guetterman's 11 wins were the most on the Yankees, more than any of their starters had. In 64 games, he had an 11–7 record, two saves, a 3.39 ERA, 48 strikeouts, 26 walks, and 80 hits allowed in 93 innings pitched.

== Dissatisfaction with workload, trade to the Mets (1991–92) ==
Guetterman had a 1.59 ERA in his first 33 appearances for the Yankees in 1991. He recorded three saves for the team in May, then achieved saves in back-to-back appearances July 1 and 4, pitching four shutout innings against the Indians to earn the one on the fourth. However, as the season wore on, he was used less as Steve Howe and Greg Cadaret emerged as the Yankees' primary left-handed relief choices. On August 28, he told the New York Times that he had requested a trade. "The frustration of not being used has led him to question his long-term desire to remain in New York," explained Jeffrey Moorad, the lawyer and agent for Guetterman. "I'm told the Yankees would trade him if the deal was right." None developed, and he remained with the team for the rest of the season. From July 23 through August 25, he had an 8.57 ERA, but he posted a 2.96 ERA in his final 16 games of the season. As it transpired, Guetterman pitched in 64 games in 1991, the same total as the season before. He had a 3–4 record, six saves, a 3.68 ERA, 35 strikeouts, 25 walks, and 91 hits in 88 innings pitched.

Through June 9, 1992, Guetterman again saw limited playing time, only making 15 appearances. "His wildness and his penchant for throwing fat pitches kept his seat in the bullpen filled," wrote Jack Curry of the New York Times. In those games, he had a 9.53 ERA. On June 9, he was dealt to the New York Mets for Tim Burke. This was the only Yankees-Mets trade between 1987 and 2001.

With the Mets, Guetterman posted a 2.38 ERA through July 24, becoming their only dependable left-hander other than John Franco, who was their closer. In a series against the San Francisco Giants, he struck out Will Clark with two men on base to end the eighth inning and preserve a 3–0 lead on July 18, then threw two scoreless innings on the July 19 in an 8–4 victory. However, from July 25 through the end of the year, he posted a 9.58 ERA in his final 24 games for the Mets. In 43 games with the Mets, he had a 3–4 record, two saves, a 5.82 ERA, 15 strikeouts, 14 walks, and 57 hits allowed in 43 1/3 innings. His combined totals between the two New York teams were a 4–5 record, two saves, a 7.09 ERA, 20 strikeouts, 27 walks, and 92 hits allowed in 66 innings. After the season, he became a free agent.

Despite his dissatisfaction in 1991, Guetterman listed New York as his favorite of the places he had played in a 2016 interview. "When you're in a place enough, it does become like home, and I was there longer than any other one place."

== Various organizations (1993–97) ==
The Los Angeles Dodgers signed Guetterman to a contract on January 13, 1993, but he was released at the end of spring training on March 30. A month passed before he signed with the St. Louis Cardinals on May 1. Assigned to the Triple-A Louisville Redbirds of the American Association, he had a 2–1 record, two saves, a 2.94 ERA, 20 strikeouts, 12 walks, and 35 hits allowed in 33 2/3 innings pitched. In late June, he was promoted to the major leagues by the Cardinals, debuting with St. Louis on June 30 and pitching for the major league club the rest of the year. With the Cardinals leading the Colorado Rockies 5–4 in the 11th inning on June 25, Guetterman entered in the bottom of the inning and gave up a hit and a walk to two of the first three batters he faced. However, he got Pedro Castellano to ground into a double play to end the game, earning him his sole save of the season in the victory. In 40 games for St. Louis, he had a 3–3 record, a 2.93 ERA, 19 strikeouts, 16 walks, and 41 hits allowed in 46 innings of work. After the season, he became a free agent.

For the second year in a row, Guetterman attended spring training with a Los Angeles metropolitan area team, signing with the California Angels on February 28, 1994. He was released on March 29, just before the end of spring training. Picked up by the San Diego Padres on May 12, he was assigned to the Las Vegas Stars of the PCL. In 15 games (one start), he had a 1–1 record, no saves, a 2.53 ERA, 18 strikeouts, four walks, and 21 1/3 innings pitched. The Padres released him without ever promoting him to the major leagues on June 24. Guetterman was then unemployed for more than a month before signing with the Mariners again on August 8. He made 12 relief appearances for Calgary, posting a 4–0 record, two saves, a 2.75 ERA, 17 strikeouts, three walks, and 19 hits allowed in 19 2/3 innings. Though he became a free agent on October 15, Guetterman was resigned on December 23.

In 1995, Guetterman began the season on the Mariners' roster, but he posted a 9.53 ERA in his first 10 games. On May 21, he was designated for assignment to make room for Steve Frey (acquired from the Giants in a trade) on the roster. He joined the Mariners' Triple-A affiliate, which was now the Tacoma Rainiers. In 33 games (one start) for Tacoma, he had a 1–2 record, four saves, a 2.95 ERA, 21 strikeouts, nine walks, and 33 hits allowed in 36 2/3 innings. On August 15, the Mariners purchased his contract from Tacoma, sending Bill Krueger to the minor leagues to make room for him. After a scoreless outing on August 18, he gave up four runs in two games on August 20 and 23. Thereafter, he posted a 4.05 ERA in his final 10 games of the season. In 23 games, he had no record, one save, a 6.88 ERA, 11 strikeouts, 11 walks, and 21 hits allowed in 17 innings pitched. The Mariners won the AL West title to make the playoffs for the first time in franchise history, but Guetterman did not make any playoff appearances for them. He became a free agent on November 8, but the Mariners resigned him on December 7.

After beginning the 1996 season with Tacoma, Guetterman was called up by the Mariners on May 28 when Tim Davis broke his left leg. "He'll be used in the same role we used Davis," Lou Piniella, the Mariners' manager, told reporters. "Middle innings, when we need to get a few left-handed hitters out." After allowing three earned runs in 2/3 of an inning in his first game on May 28, he had a 1.74 ERA over his next 16. On July 13, he entered a game against the Angels with one out in the fourth inning, Randy Velarde on first base, and the Mariners trailing 4–0. He gave up a single to Jorge Fábregas and a walk to Gary Disarcina, but he got Darin Erstad to hit into a force play without a runner scoring. Blas Minor subsequently relieved him and retired Rex Hudler to end the inning. On July 14, Guetterman was designated for assignment to make room on the roster for Ken Griffey Jr., who was coming off the disabled list. Guetterman would not be called up again all season. In 17 games for Seattle, he had an 0–2 record, no saves, a 4.09 ERA, six strikeouts, 10 walks, and 11 hits allowed in 11 innings pitched. With Tacoma, he made 25 appearances, posting a 2–2 record, a 3.77 ERA, 28 strikeouts, 10 walks, and 27 hits allowed in 28 2/3 innings pitched. After the season, he became a free agent.

Even towards the end of his career, Guetterman still had a desire to pitch. "They had to take the uniform away from me," he said in an interview, explaining that he was always looking for a team to sign him. When no major league organizations signed him in 1997, Guetterman joined the Sioux Falls Canaries of the independent Northern League, getting a chance to be used as a starting pitcher over an extended period for the first time since 1987. Of his 13 appearances with the Canaries, 12 were starts. He had a 3–7 record, a 4.50 ERA, 33 strikeouts, 10 walks, and 89 hits allowed in 76 innings pitched.

== Career statistics and pitching style ==
Guetterman appeared in 425 games over parts of 11 seasons in a major league career that lasted from 1984 until 1996. He had a 38–36 record (a .514 winning percentage), a 4.33 career ERA, 287 strikeouts, 222 walks, and 717 hits allowed in 658 1/3 innings. Outside of 1987, in which he made 17 starts, he never made more than four starts in a season, spending most of his career as a relief pitcher.

A sinkerball pitcher, Guetterman threw a curveball as well. He found the sinkerball an effective pitch for him, even against hitters who were not known to be susceptible to it. Guetterman recalled facing Wade Boggs, who was supposed to struggle with off-speed pitches off the plate. "Well, I would throw off-speed away, and he would hammer it." After two years, Guetterman began throwing his sinker to Boggs and got him to ground out to the shortstop instead. Once he transitioned to the bullpen, he would prepare himself mentally for an appearance beginning in about the fourth or fifth inning. He was a tall presence on the mound, standing at 6 feet 8 inches (2.03 m).

== Personal life ==
Guetterman teaches children how to pitch at the East Tennessee Baseball Training Facility in Lenoir City, Tennessee. His wife, Drew, is the founder of Crossroads Christian Academy in Lenoir City. Their son, Jamin, became a pitcher for Lenoir City High School. In 2003, he became associated with "Battin' 1000," a Pro-Life group composed of several former baseball celebrities. "A devout Baptist," according to Jack O'Connell of the Hartford Courant, Guetterman became a Christian while at Liberty University. Though he had attended church before coming to Liberty, he said that he looked on Christianity more as a "fire insurance" policy. "I came to the realization that I didn't have Jesus as my Lord and Savior," he said, due to the preaching and spiritual study he received while a Liberty student. "I made that commitment at Liberty." He currently attends Canvas Church in Lenoir City, TN with his wife and son.
