= Ron Meridith =

American baseball player (born 1956)

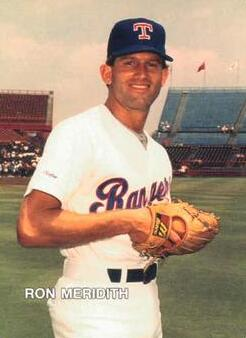
- Meridith with the Texas Rangers c. 1987
- Relief pitcher
- Born: November 26, 1956 (age 69); San Pedro, Los Angeles, California, U.S.
- Batted: Left Threw: Left

MLB debut
- September 16, 1984, for the Chicago Cubs

Last MLB appearance
- June 5, 1987, for the Texas Rangers

MLB statistics
- Win–loss record: 5–2
- Earned run average: 4.78
- Strikeouts: 46
- Stats at Baseball Reference

Teams
- Chicago Cubs (1984–1985); Texas Rangers (1986–1987)

Ronald Knox Meridith (born November 26, 1956) is an American former middle reliever in Major League Baseball who pitched from 1984 through 1987 for the Chicago Cubs and Texas Rangers. On September 9, 1985, as a member of the Cubs, Meridith recorded the final out of the game to pick up his one and only career save against the arch rival Cardinals. He saved the game for starter Ray Fontenot.

Meridith now works as a senior mortgage consultant at First Centennial Mortgage in Irvine, California.
