= Laddie Renfroe =

American baseball player (born 1962)

- Pitcher
- Born: May 9, 1962 (age 63); Natchez, Mississippi
- Batted: Switch Threw: Right

MLB debut
- July 3, 1991, for the Chicago Cubs

Last MLB appearance
- July 17, 1991, for the Chicago Cubs

MLB statistics
- Win–loss record: 0–1
- Earned run average: 13.50
- Strikeouts: 4
- Stats at Baseball Reference

Teams
- Chicago Cubs (1991)

Cohen Williams "Laddie" Renfroe (born May 9, 1962) is a former Major League Baseball pitcher. He pitched in four games with the Chicago Cubs in 1991. Renfroe pitched with a sidearm delivery and appeared primarily as a relief pitcher and closer throughout his nine-year professional career.

== Career ==
Renfroe walked on to the baseball team at the University of Mississippi, where he set school records for the most career pitching appearances and wins. While in college, he experimented with a sidearm delivery, which he eventually adopted permanently. In 1982, he played collegiate summer baseball with the Cotuit Kettleers of the Cape Cod Baseball League. He was drafted by the Chicago Cubs in the 25th round of the 1984 Major League Baseball June Amateur Draft, and began the 1984 season with the Geneva Cubs.

After three seasons in Class-A ball, Renfroe split both the 1987 and 1988 seasons between the Double-A Pittsfield Cubs and Triple-A Iowa Cubs. Pitching for the Double-A Charlotte Knights of the Southern League in 1989, he led all minor-league pitchers with 19 wins, and won the Southern League Pitcher of the Year award that season. He was promoted back to Iowa in 1990, and spent the following three seasons with the club.

He was called up to the Chicago Cubs on July 2, 1991, and made his Major League debut the following day at Wrigley Field against the Pittsburgh Pirates. He ultimately appeared in four games as a relief pitcher with Chicago, finishing with a 0–1 win–loss record and a 13.50 ERA. He returned to Iowa on July 25.

In September 1992 as a member of the Iowa Cubs, he was injured when struck in the head by an errant baseball. The resultant head trauma caused him speech and vision problems, and he retired thereafter, in part because of sustained complications from the injury.

== Personal life ==
Renfroe was born in Natchez, Mississippi but moved to Nashua, New Hampshire with his family at a young age. Renfroe played soccer, football, and baseball at Nashua High School in Nashua. He pitched two no-hitters in high school and led his team to the state championship in 1979. After retiring, he coached baseball and soccer and relocated to Olive Branch, Mississippi.

His son David was an infielder in the Boston Red Sox's minor league system from 2010 to 2013.
