= Derek Botelho =

American baseball player (born 1956)

- Pitcher
- Born: August 2, 1956 (age 70); Long Beach, California, U.S.
- Batted: Right Threw: Right

MLB debut
- July 18, 1982, for the Kansas City Royals

Last MLB appearance
- September 24, 1985, for the Chicago Cubs

MLB statistics
- Win–loss record: 3–4
- Earned run average: 4.90
- Strikeouts: 35
- Stats at Baseball Reference

Teams
- Kansas City Royals (1982); Chicago Cubs (1985)

Derek Wayne Botelho (born August 2, 1956) is an American former right-handed pitcher in Major League Baseball for the Kansas City Royals and Chicago Cubs, who is currently the pitching coach for the Class A-Advanced Lynchburg Hillcats.

== Career ==
Botelho was drafted three times before signing with a Major League team, the first time as a 26th-round selection (555th overall) in 1974 by the Philadelphia Phillies, as a high schooler out of Boca Raton Community High School in Florida, but he did not sign, electing to play for Miami-Dade South Community College. He was then drafted in the fourth round (76th overall) of the secondary phase of the 1975 draft by the California Angels, but again did not sign. After his sophomore year of college, the Phillies again drafted him, this time in the second round (42nd overall) of the 1976 draft, after which he signed.

After he had a solid 1978 season at AA Reading, the Phillies traded Botelho in an eight-player deal, sending him, along with Henry Mack, Jerry Martin, Ted Sizemore, and Barry Foote to the Cubs in exchange for Manny Trillo, Greg Gross, and Dave Rader. He pitched four games for the Cubs' AAA team in Wichita before being released. After being out of baseball for about a year, Botelho signed as a free agent with the Royals organization. In one and one-half years, he worked his way from high-A ball to the majors, debuting with Kansas City on July 18, 1982.

Botelho's first Major League game was an impressive one. Starting against the Boston Red Sox at Fenway Park, Botelho pitched seven scoreless innings, allowing just three hits as the Royals blanked the Sox 9–0. His first strikeout victim was Jerry Remy. He made three more starts and one relief appearance before returning to AAA, but his career seemed to be heading in the right direction. He went 2–1 with a 4.13 ERA all told with the Royals. Unfortunately, 1983 didn't go as well for Botelho, as he stumbled to a 10–14 record and 5.42 ERA for AAA Omaha. The Royals decided to unload Botelho, trading him with Don Werner to the Cubs in exchange for Alan Hargesheimer just before the start of the 1984 season.

Botelho spent the balance of the Cubs' 1984 division title season with their AAA team in Iowa, posting a solid season of a 10–11 record and 3.81 ERA, perhaps the best showing of any of the I-Cubs' starting pitchers. After going 11–7 in 20 starts for Iowa in 1985, Botelho was called up to the Cubs to join their injury-decimated starting rotation. He lost his first two starts on August 5 and 11 but remained in the rotation, finally winning his first game as a Cub on September 1 against the Atlanta Braves, when he pitched his only Major League complete game. However, after a disastrous September 6 start (1 2/3 innings, 5 earned runs), Botelho was moved to the bullpen. His appearance on September 24, 1985, would prove to be his last in the Major Leagues.

Botelho spent three next three seasons pitching for the AAA teams of the Cincinnati Reds, Royals, and St. Louis Cardinals before retiring as a player at age 32.

Botelho resurfaced in 1990 as a minor league pitching coach for the Martinsville Phillies and in 1998 as a minor league pitching coach for the Burlington Bees. He has also served in that capacity for the Rockford Reds, Dayton Dragons, GCL Braves, Danville Braves, Richmond Braves, the Mississippi Braves, the Gwinnett Braves and currently, the Lynchburg Hillcats.

== Personal ==
Botelho now resides in Burlington, Iowa.
