= Ray Fontenot =

American baseball player (born 1957)

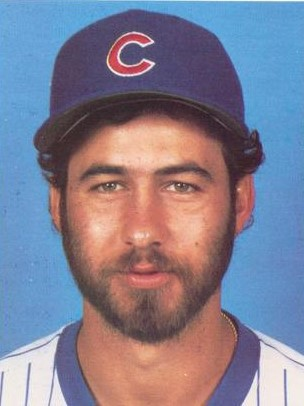
- Pitcher
- Born: August 8, 1957 (age 68); Lake Charles, Louisiana, U.S.
- Batted: Left Threw: Left

MLB debut
- June 30, 1983, for the New York Yankees

Last MLB appearance
- October 1, 1986, for the Minnesota Twins

MLB statistics
- Win–loss record: 25–26
- Earned run average: 4.02
- Strikeouts: 216
- Stats at Baseball Reference

Teams
- New York Yankees (1983–1984); Chicago Cubs (1985–1986); Minnesota Twins (1986)

Silton Ray Fontenot (born August 8, 1957) is an American former Major League Baseball pitcher who played for four seasons between 1983 and 1986. He played for three teams in those four years – the New York Yankees, Chicago Cubs and Minnesota Twins.

Fontenot, a 6 ft 0 in (1.83 m), 175 pounds (79 kg) left-hander, was drafted by the Texas Rangers in the 34th round (815th overall) of the 1979 amateur entry draft. He had great success in the minors, with an ERA of 3.16, striking out 377 batters in more than 399 innings pitched. He was used mostly as a starter, although he pitched in relief in 1983.

== Major League career ==
He made his Major League debut on June 30, 1983, against the Baltimore Orioles at the age of 25, filling in for the injured Ron Guidry. In that game, he gave up only one earned run in 5 2/3 innings, but still got only a no-decision. In his rookie year, he started 15 games and went 8-2 with a 3.33 ERA; he threw three complete games and one shutout. Even though he got a lot strikeouts in the minors, he struck out only 27 in more than 93 innings in his rookie season. His career high was seven strikeouts in a game, which he accomplished twice.

Oft-injured, he was used as a starter/reliever in 1984 and 1985; he pitched a total of 73 games in those years, starting 47 of them. He gave up 23 home runs in 1985, 5th most in the league. In 1986 he was used entirely as a reliever, appearing in 57 games for an ERA of 5.23. He threw 6 wild pitches that year, about one every 12 innings.

Overall in his Major League career, he went 25-26 with a 4.03 ERA. He struck out 216 and walked 153 in just over 493 innings pitched, while collecting only 3 hits in 48 career at-bats, for a .062 career batting average. He had a .919 career fielding percentage. He played his final game on October 1, 1986.

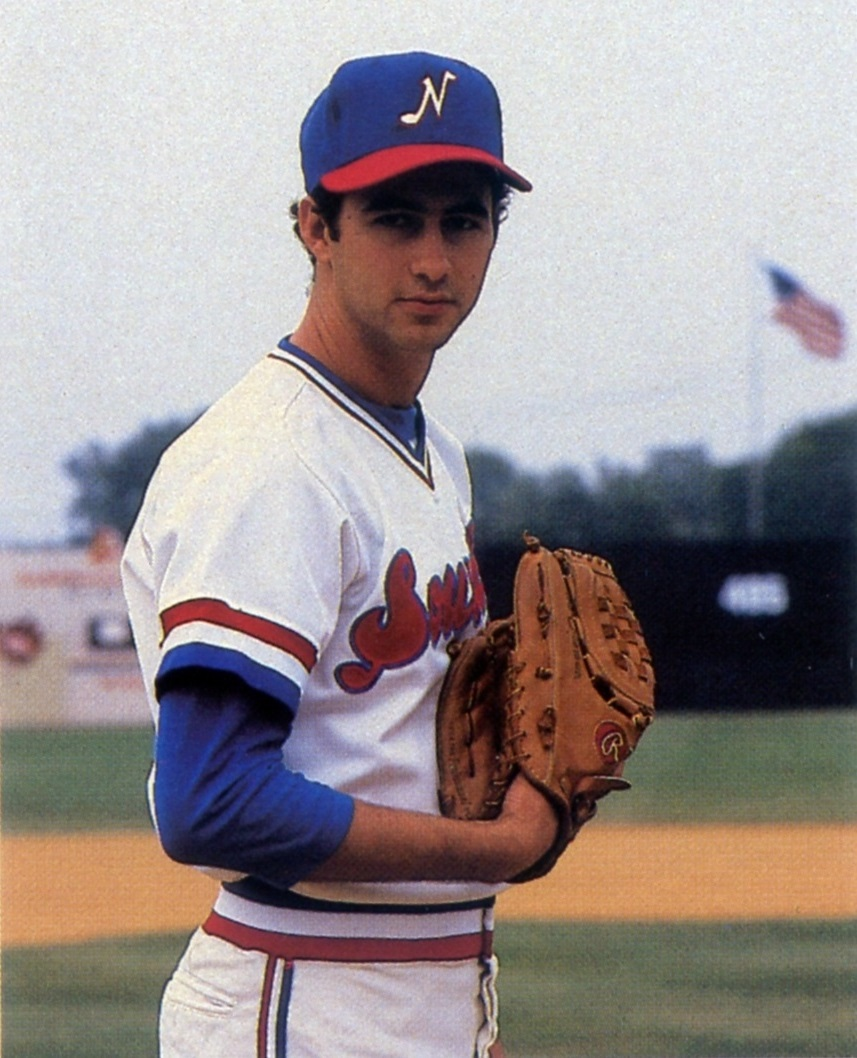
Fontenot with the Nashville Sounds in 1982

== Major transactions ==
- As one of the players to be named later, Fontenot was sent by the Rangers to the Yankees on October 8, 1979 to complete a deal made on August 1, 1979. In the end, the Rangers ended up sending Fontenot, Oscar Gamble, Gene Nelson and minor leaguer Amos Lewis for Mickey Rivers and minor leaguers Bob Polinsky, Neal Mersch and Mark Softy.
- He was traded along with Brian Dayett from the Yankees to the Cubs for Henry Cotto, Ron Hassey, Rich Bordi and Porfi Altamirano at the Winter Meetings on December 4, 1984.
- On August 13, 1986, the Cubs sent Fontenot, George Frazier and minor leaguer Julius McDougal to the Twins for Ron Davis and minor leaguer Dewayne Coleman.
