= Jon Perlman =

American baseball player (born 1956)

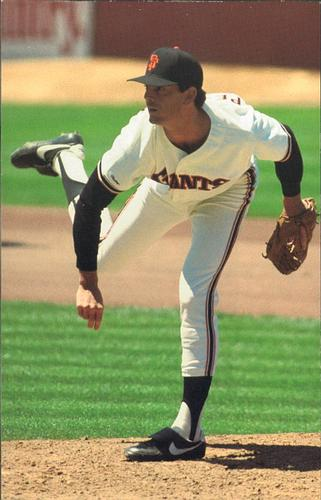
- Pitcher
- Born: December 13, 1956 (age 69); Dallas, Texas, U.S.
- Batted: Left Threw: Right

MLB debut
- September 6, 1985, for the Chicago Cubs

Last MLB appearance
- July 8, 1988, for the Cleveland Indians

MLB statistics
- Win–loss record: 1–2
- Earned run average: 6.35
- Strikeouts: 17
- Stats at Baseball Reference

Teams
- Chicago Cubs (1985); San Francisco Giants (1987); Cleveland Indians (1988)

Jonathan Samuel Perlman (born December 13, 1956) is an American former Major League Baseball pitcher who played for three seasons. He played for the Chicago Cubs in 1985, the San Francisco Giants in 1987, and the Cleveland Indians in 1988. He played college baseball for Baylor University.
