= Henry Cotto =

American baseball player and coach (born 1961)

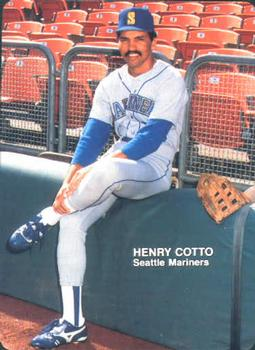
- Outfielder
- Born: January 5, 1961 (age 65); New York, New York, U.S.
- Batted: Right Threw: Right

MLB debut
- April 5, 1984, for the Chicago Cubs

Last MLB appearance
- September 30, 1993, for the Florida Marlins

MLB statistics
- Batting average: .261
- Home runs: 44
- Runs batted in: 210
- Stats at Baseball Reference

Teams
- Chicago Cubs (1984); New York Yankees (1985–1987); Seattle Mariners (1988–1993); Florida Marlins (1993); Yomiuri Giants (1994)

Henry Cotto (born January 5, 1961) is an American former professional baseball outfielder and coach. He played in all or parts of ten seasons in Major League Baseball, from 1984 until 1993. He played one season in Japan for the Yomiuri Giants, winning the 1994 Japan Series. After a brief return to the minor leagues in 1995, he retired. He then coached in the minor leagues for two decades.

== Playing career ==
Cotto grew up in Puerto Rico, moving to the island three months after being born in New York. He attended high school at Colegio Bautista de Caguas. He signed with the Chicago Cubs as an international free agent on June 7, 1980.

Cotto played in the Puerto Rican winter baseball league for the Criollos de Caguas during the 1980s.

After batting .274 in 146 at bats during his 1984 rookie season with the Chicago Cubs, he was traded along with Ron Hassey, Rich Bordi, and Porfi Altamirano to the New York Yankees for Ray Fontenot and Brian Dayett at the winter meetings on December 4, 1984.

In December 1987, the Yankees traded Cotto and Steve Trout to the Seattle Mariners for pitchers Lee Guetterman, Clay Parker, and Wade Taylor. In 1988, Cotto reached career highs with 27 stolen bases and 133 games played.

On June 27, 1993, Cotto and pitcher Jeff Darwin were traded to the Florida Marlins for Dave Magadan. After the season, the two teams swapped Magadan and Darwin.

Cotto signed with the Baltimore Orioles before the 1994 season but had his contract canceled so that he could sign with the Yomiuri Giants of Nippon Professional Baseball. He hit .251 with 18 home runs in Japan in 1994, second most on the team behind Hideki Matsui. Due to the MLB strike that year, the postseason Japan Series received additional attention in the United States. Cotto hit home runs in games 5 and 6 of the series, which the Giants won 4 games to 2.

Cotto returned to the United States in 1995, signing a contract with the Chicago White Sox on February 21. Upon signing, Cotto said he would consider being a replacement player amid the ongoing strike. He later agreed to be a replacement player but was assigned to the Triple-A Nashville Sounds after the strike ended and union players returned to major league teams. He played in 17 games for Nashville before retiring due to a shoulder injury.

In 884 games over 10 MLB seasons, Cotto posted a .261 batting average with 296 runs, 44 home runs, 210 runs batted in, and 130 stolen bases. He finished his career with a .989 fielding percentage, playing all three outfield positions.

== Coaching career ==
After retiring, Cotto served as a minor league coach and manager, primarily in the Seattle Mariners' and San Francisco Giants' farm systems.

He was a coach for the Double-A Port City Roosters in 1996, the Double-A New Haven Ravens in 1997 and 1998, the Triple-A Tacoma Rainiers in 1999 and 2000, and with the Mariners organization in 2001. In 2002, his title changed to "baserunning coordinator." From 2003 to 2005, he coached the Single-A Inland Empire 66ers, then moved up to the Double-A San Antonio Missions in 2006. In 2007 and 2008, he was the hitting coach for the short-season Everett AquaSox.

Beginning in 2009, he worked as a roving outfield/baserunning instructor for the San Francisco Giants and was the manager of the Arizona League Giants from 2015 to 2017. In 2019, Cotto said he was "semi-retired" from coaching.

== Personal life ==
Cotto's son, also named Henry Cotto, was drafted by the Mariners in the 41st round of the 2008 MLB draft but did not play professionally. Cotto and his wife Laurie live in Phoenix and have a second child, Claudia.

Before playing professional baseball, Cotto signed a contract to play professional basketball in Puerto Rico.
