= Steve Engel =

American baseball player (born 1961)

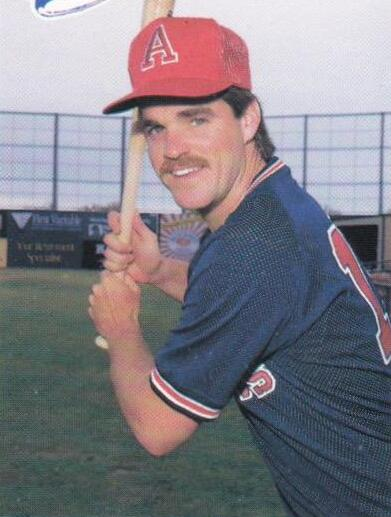
- Engel with the Arkansas Travelers c. 1988
- Pitcher
- Born: December 31, 1961 (age 64); Cincinnati, Ohio, U.S.
- Batted: Right Threw: Left

MLB debut
- July 30, 1985, for the Chicago Cubs

Last MLB appearance
- October 3, 1985, for the Chicago Cubs

MLB statistics
- Win–loss record: 1–5
- Earned run average: 5.57
- Strikeouts: 29
- Stats at Baseball Reference

Teams
- Chicago Cubs (1985)

Steven Michael Engel (born December 31, 1961) is an American former Major League Baseball pitcher.

He attended Eastern Kentucky University, where he played for the Eastern Kentucky Colonels baseball team.

Engel was drafted by the Chicago Cubs in the 5th round of the 1983 Major League Baseball draft. He pitched in 11 games for the 1985 Chicago Cubs. In 1986, he was the player to be named later from an earlier trade, in which the Cubs traded Billy Hatcher to the Houston Astros for Jerry Mumphrey.
