= Clay Parker =

American baseball player (born 1962)

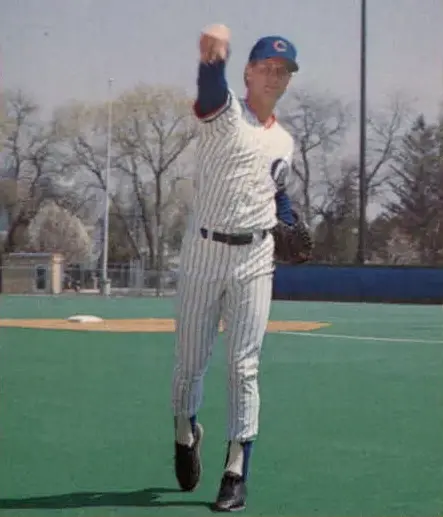
- Parker with the Columbus Clippers c. 1988
- Pitcher
- Born: December 19, 1962 (age 63); Columbia, Louisiana, U.S.
- Batted: Right Threw: Right

MLB debut
- September 14, 1987, for the Seattle Mariners

Last MLB appearance
- June 8, 1992, for the Seattle Mariners

MLB statistics
- Win–loss record: 7–10
- Earned run average: 4.42
- Strikeouts: 121
- Stats at Baseball Reference

Teams
- Seattle Mariners (1987); New York Yankees (1989–1990); Detroit Tigers (1990); Seattle Mariners (1992)

James Clayton Parker (born December 19, 1962) is an American former professional baseball middle relief pitcher. Parker played in Major League Baseball (MLB) for the Seattle Mariners, New York Yankees and Detroit Tigers (1990) in parts of four seasons spanning 1987–1992.

== Career ==
Parker was born in Columbia, Louisiana. He graduated from Caldwell Parish High School in 1981 and attended Louisiana State University where he played college baseball and college football for the LSU Tigers. He played for the Tigers football team in the 1983 Orange Bowl and the 1985 Sugar Bowl.

Parker was selected by the Mariners in the 15th round of the 1985 MLB draft out of Louisiana State.

He made his MLB debut on September 14, 1987, against the Cleveland Indians, allowing three earned runs on five hits and one walk, while striking out five on 2 1/3 innings of work and did not have a decision. During the offseason, he was sent along with Lee Guetterman and Wade Taylor to the New York Yankees in the same transaction that brought Henry Cotto to the Mariners.

His most productive season came in 1989 with the Yankees, when he posted a 4–5 record and a 3.68 ERA in 22 pitching appearances, including 17 starts and two complete games.

In 1991 Parker found himself on the move again, this time along with Lance McCullers to the Tigers in exchange for Matt Nokes. He went 2–2 with a 3.18 ERA in 24 games at Detroit and spent 1991 in the minors, being released during the midseason. He returned to the Mariners in 1992, and went 0–2 with a 7.56 in six starts and two relief games.

Overall, Parker registered a record of 7–10 with a 4.42 ERA in 62 games, striking out 121 and walking 78 in 234 innings.

He also pitched from 1985 through 1995 in the minors, going 45–28 with a 2.92 in 118 games.

In between, Parker played winter ball with the Leones del Caracas club of the Venezuelan League in the 1987–1988 season, as he went 1–0 with a 1.56 ERA in four starts.

== Personal life ==
His son, Clayton Parker, pitched for the Alabama Crimson Tide team as a freshman in 2013.

Parker served as the chief executive officer and president of Southport Capital, a Mount Airy, North Carolina firm that was accused by the Securities and Exchange Commission (SEC) for operating a ponzi scheme. Southport advisers would tell investors that, despite the stock market being volatile in nature, their investments were safe and pay at a fixed return in a small time period. However, the company never received any profits and most returns were just money from later investments.
