= Johnny Abrego =

American baseball player (born 1962)

- Pitcher
- Born: July 4, 1962 (age 64); Corpus Christi, Texas, U.S.
- Batted: Right Threw: Right

MLB debut
- September 4, 1985, for the Chicago Cubs

Last MLB appearance
- October 3, 1985, for the Chicago Cubs

MLB statistics
- Win–loss record: 1–1
- Earned run average: 6.38
- Strikeouts: 13
- Stats at Baseball Reference

Teams
- Chicago Cubs (1985)

Johnny Ray Abrego (born July 4, 1962) is an American former right-handed starting pitcher in Major League Baseball for the Chicago Cubs. His career was a brief one, as he was a member of the Cubs' starting rotation for the last month of the 1985 season. He also made one relief appearance during his brief career.

Abrego was drafted by the Philadelphia Phillies in the first round (20th pick) of the 1981 amateur player draft out of Mission San Jose High School in Fremont, California. Abrego missed the whole 1982 season due to reconstructive elbow surgery. The Cubs selected him in the Rule 5 draft in 1983. He was promoted to the Cubs in 1985 despite faring poorly in Triple-A, where he posted an 0–5 record and allowed 22 earned runs in 25 innings over five starts for an earned run average (ERA) of 7.92.

Once with the Cubs, Abrego went 1–1 with a 6.38 ERA. His lone major league win came on September 21, 1985, when he defeated the team that had drafted him, Philadelphia. He was back in Triple-A the next season, though his year was cut short by injury. After two mediocre seasons in the minors, the Cubs released him in 1987 at the age of 24. Abrego subsequently retired from baseball.
