= Billy Hatcher =

American baseball player and coach (born 1960)

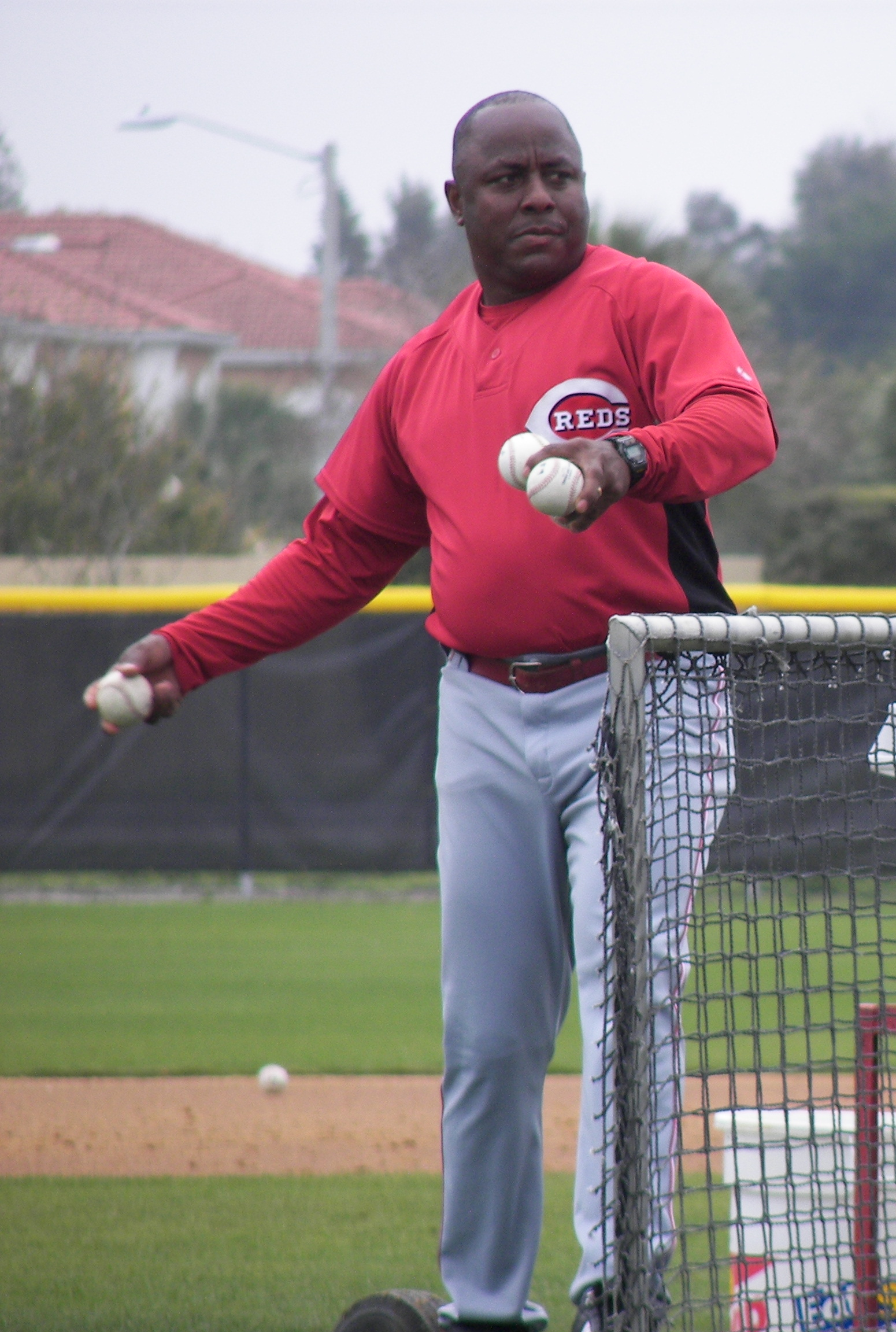
- Hatcher with the Cincinnati Reds
- Outfielder
- Born: October 4, 1960 (age 66); Williams, Arizona, U.S.
- Batted: Right Threw: Right

MLB debut
- September 10, 1984, for the Chicago Cubs

Last MLB appearance
- May 9, 1995, for the Texas Rangers

MLB statistics
- Batting average: .264
- Home runs: 54
- Runs batted in: 399
- Stats at Baseball Reference

Teams
- As player: Chicago Cubs (1984–1985); Houston Astros (1986–1989); Pittsburgh Pirates (1989); Cincinnati Reds (1990–1992); Boston Red Sox (1992–1994); Philadelphia Phillies (1994); Texas Rangers (1995); As coach: Tampa Bay Devil Rays (1998–2005); Cincinnati Reds (2006–2018); Miami Marlins (2020)

Career highlights and awards
- World Series champion (1990)

William Augustus Hatcher (born October 4, 1960) is an American former professional baseball outfielder and first base coach. He played for the Chicago Cubs, Houston Astros, Pittsburgh Pirates, Cincinnati Reds, Boston Red Sox, Philadelphia Phillies, and Texas Rangers.

== Pre-MLB career ==
In 1979, Hatcher graduated from Williams High School in Williams, Arizona, where he had pitched an 11-inning no-hitter as a junior. Hatcher then played for Yavapai Community College in Prescott, Arizona, where he was a junior college All-America selection.

== Professional playing career ==
=== Chicago Cubs ===
Hatcher was drafted by the Cubs in the sixth round of the January 1981 MLB draft. He rose quickly through the Cubs' minor league system, playing exactly one season at each minor league level before receiving a late-season call-up to the major league club in 1984. He split time between AAA and the Cubs during the 1985 season before being traded to the Astros along with Steve Engel for Jerry Mumphrey.

=== Houston Astros ===
1988 Mother's Cookie card of Hatcher for Houston Astros

Hatcher would be the Astros' starting left fielder for the next 3 1/2 seasons. He is best remembered by Astros fans for a dramatic post-season home run in the 14th inning of Game 6 of the Astros' 1986 National League Championship Series vs the New York Mets' Jesse Orosco, temporarily saving the Astros from elimination.

Hatcher achieved his best statistical season in 1987, when he opened the season with a 16-game hitting streak and led the Astros in hitting (.296) and had career highs in stolen bases (53, third in the National League), home runs (11) and runs batted in (63). His most dubious achievement came that season as well, as he received a 10-day suspension for bat corking. Hatcher later explained that he had borrowed the bat from relief pitcher Dave Smith. Hatcher broke several of his own, uncorked bats in games leading up to the incident, and he continues to maintain his innocence.

=== Pittsburgh Pirates ===
Near the end of the 1989 season, the struggling Astros traded Hatcher to the Pirates for Glenn Wilson. He played just 27 games for Pittsburgh before being traded to the Reds for Jeff Richardson and Mike Roesler.

=== Cincinnati Reds ===
Hatcher had a memorable season in 1990 for the Reds when he stole 30 bases during their closely contested 1990 pennant run. On August 21, 1990, he tied the major league record against the Cubs with four doubles in one game. He ended up leading National League outfielders in fielding percentage (.997) on the season. The best hitting performance of Hatcher's career was timely, coming during the 1990 World Series against the Oakland Athletics. During the 1990 post-season he hit .519 overall (14-for-27), including a World Series record .750 in the four-game World Series sweep over the heavily favored A's. This mark broke a 62-year-old World Series record that was previously held by Babe Ruth (.625 in 1928), though it was achieved with the at-bat totals for only three games, as Hatcher was removed from Game 4 in the 1st inning after being hit on the hand by a Dave Stewart pitch and was taken to the hospital for precautionary x-rays. They were negative and he was able to return to the ballpark in time for the victory celebration. Hatcher also set records for most consecutive hits in a series (7) and most doubles in a four-game series (4). Despite his torrid hitting, Hatcher was not named the Series Most Valuable Player, that going to Reds pitcher José Rijo, who had a nearly perfect series of his own. Hatcher was later awarded the 1990 Babe Ruth Award for his performance. He finished his career with a .404 postseason batting average in 14 games which included 12 runs, 2 home runs and 6 runs batted in.

=== Boston Red Sox ===
Hatcher was traded to the Red Sox for Tom Bolton in the middle of the 1992 season and, on August 3 of that season while with the Red Sox, stole home against the Toronto Blue Jays' Juan Guzmán. He was the Red Sox' starter in center field for the 1993 season before finishing his career as a reserve for the Phillies and Rangers before retiring following the 1995 season. Hatcher played 12 seasons in the major Leagues. He finished his career with a .264 career batting average with 54 home runs and 399 runs batted in during 1,233 games.

== Coaching career ==
In 2015, Billy Hatcher entered his tenth season as a Major League coach with the Reds organization. He works as third-base, outfield, and baserunning coach. Prior to joining the Reds, he spent ten seasons in the Tampa Bay Rays organization, first as a roving minor-league instructor (1996), then as a minor-league coach for 1997 Florida State League champion St. Petersburg. Hatcher spent the next eight seasons as a member of the Rays' Major League coaching staff (1998–2005) as the first-base coach (1998–99, 2003–05), bench coach (2001–02), and third-base coach (2000). He holds the distinction of being the only coach to work for the Rays in each of the club's first eight years of existence. For the 2016 season, he switched from first base coach to third base coach. Hatcher was named the first base coach for the Miami Marlins prior to the 2020 season, and remained in that position until 2021.

== Personal life ==
Hatcher and his wife Karen have a son, Derek, who was Florida's 2004 Class 2A State Player of the Year in football at Berkeley Prep in Tampa, Florida. He then played safety for the University of Richmond football team, where he was a 2x All-Conference Player and won the 2008 NCAA FCS National Championship. The couple also have a daughter, Chelsea, who played soccer at the University of Tennessee from 2008 to 2011. She was selected to the All-SEC first team in 2010. She had 11 career goals, six assists and 28 total points over 58 matches played during her three-year stint at Rocky Top. She has also moved into fifth all-time in the UT history books by launching 224 total shots (64 on frame). She is an attorney and works as an Assistant District Attorney for Jared Effler. On March 14, 2025, she completed the Trial Advocacy Course. He is now an assistant coach for the Madeira Mustangs—a high school football team in Cincinnati, Ohio.

== See also ==
- List of Major League Baseball career stolen bases leaders

Sporting positions
Preceded by position created	Tampa Bay Devil Rays First Base Coach; 1998–1999	Succeeded by José Cardenal
Preceded by Greg Riddoch	Tampa Bay Devil Rays Third Base Coach; 2000–2001	Succeeded by Terry Collins
Preceded by Bill Russell	Tampa Bay Devil Rays Bench Coach; 2001–2002	Succeeded by John McLaren
Preceded by Lee May	Tampa Bay Devil Rays First Base Coach; 2003–2005	Succeeded by George Hendrick
Preceded by Randy Whisler	Cincinnati Reds First Base Coach; 2006–2015	Succeeded by Freddie Benavides
Preceded by Jim Riggleman	Cincinnati Reds Third Base Coach; 2016–2018	Succeeded by J.R. House
Preceded by Trey Hillman	Miami Marlins First Base Coach; 2020	Succeeded by Keith Johnson
