= 1985 Kansas City Royals season =

1985 Kansas City Royals
- World Series champions American League champions American League West champions
- League: American League
- Division: West
- Ballpark: Royals Stadium
- City: Kansas City, Missouri
- Record: 91–71 (.562)
- Divisional place: 1st place
- Owners: Ewing Kauffman
- General managers: John Schuerholz
- Managers: Dick Howser
- Television: WDAF-TV 4 (Denny Matthews, Denny Trease, Fred White); Sports Time (Phil Stone, Dwayne Mosley)
- Radio: WIBW–AM 580; KCMO–AM 810 (Denny Matthews, Fred White)

The 1985 Kansas City Royals season was the 17th season in Royals franchise history. It ended with the Royals' 1st World Series champion over their intrastate rivals, the St. Louis Cardinals. The Royals won the American League West Division for the second consecutive season and the sixth time in ten years. The team improved its record to 91–71 on the strength of its pitching, led by Bret Saberhagen's Cy Young Award-winning performance.

In the postseason, the Royals went on to win the 1985 American League Championship Series for just the second time and the World Series for the first time (they previously lost the 1980 World Series). Both the ALCS and the World Series were won in seven games after the Royals lost the first two games at home and three of the first four games overall. The championship series against the Cardinals was forever remembered in St. Louis by umpires' supposedly blown calls in Game Six: one that cost the Royals a run in the 4th, and a blown call by umpire Don Denkinger that allowed Jorge Orta to reach first. The World Series is remembered in Kansas City as the culmination of ten years of dominance by the Royals, during which they reached the playoffs seven times, with stars such as George Brett, Hal McRae and Willie Wilson.

The team was managed by Dick Howser in his fourth and final full season with the Royals.

The Royals did not return to the postseason until 2014 and won the World Series again in 2015.

== Offseason ==
- January 18, 1985: Danny Darwin was traded as part of a 4-team trade by the Texas Rangers with a player to be named later to the Milwaukee Brewers. The Milwaukee Brewers sent Jim Sundberg to the Kansas City Royals. The New York Mets sent Tim Leary to the Milwaukee Brewers. The Kansas City Royals sent Don Slaught to the Texas Rangers. The Kansas City Royals sent Frank Wills to the New York Mets. The Texas Rangers sent Bill Nance (minors) (January 30, 1985) to the Milwaukee Brewers to complete the trade.
- February 25, 1985: Jamie Quirk was signed as a free agent with the Kansas City Royals.

== Offense ==
Team leaders
Statistic		Player
Runs	108	George Brett
Hits	184	George Brett
Doubles	38	George Brett
Triples	21	^{#}Willie Wilson
Home runs	36	^{3}Steve Balboni
Runs batted in	112	George Brett
Stolen bases	43	Willie Wilson
Batting average	.335	^{2}George Brett
Notes: ^#Led the majors; ^1Led league; ^2Second place; ^3Third place

== Pitching ==
Team leaders
Statistic		Pitcher
Games pitched	84	^{#}Dan Quisenberry
Innings pitched	237.2	Charlie Leibrandt
Wins	20	^{2}Bret Saberhagen
Strikeouts	158	Bret Saberhagen
Complete games	10	Bret Saberhagen
Shutouts	3	Danny Jackson & Charlie Leibrandt
Saves	37	^{1}Dan Quisenberry
Earned run average	2.69	^{2}Charlie Leibrandt
Notes: ^#Led the majors; ^1Led league; ^2Second place; ^3Third place

== Regular season ==
The Royals opened the season at home on Monday, April 8, in a three-game series versus the Toronto Blue Jays. In his second straight opening day start, Bud Black faced off against the Blue Jays' Dave Stieb and allowed only a single earned run on four hits as the Royals won, 2–1. Stieb held the Royals scoreless for 6 2/3 innings before giving up the game-winning runs on a double by Willie Wilson. Black exited the game in the eighth inning with two outs after giving up a single and a walk. Dan Quisenberry closed out the game for his first save of the new season. The attendance of 41,086 was the highest of any home opener and wasn't exceeded until the 2005 season. It was also the second highest of any of the Royals' regular season home games in 1985.

The Seattle Mariners had the strongest start in the division—winning their first six games at home by sweeping the Oakland Athletics and Minnesota Twins. But the Mariners quickly faded into sixth place as they lost twelve of their next thirteen games. After their losses in Seattle, the Athletics returned home to win seven of their next nine games, and on April 21 were in a three-way tie for first with the Mariners and the California Angels. However, a seven-game losing streak at the end of April pushed them down into sixth place on May 1 and five games below the Angels. At the end of April the Royals had a record of 11–8 (.579), but they had fallen two games behind the Angels who had finished the month with a six-game winning streak and had a 14–7 record.

The Royals began the month of May by losing seven of their first eight games, culminating in an 11–3 loss on May 11 at home to the New York Yankees. The team was three games below .500, in fourth place and 5 1/2 games behind the Angels. Three days and three wins later, with a record of 15–15, the Royals would not drop below .500 at any time during the remainder of the season. (But they would have a .500 record as late as July 12 when they were 42–42.) With two six-game winning streaks, the team won thirteen of their next seventeen games to enter a first-place tie with the Angels on May 29, with a record of 25–19. This stretch of games was highlighted by three complete-game shutouts pitched by Bret Saberhagen, Bud Black, and Charlie Leibrandt in which they allowed only a combined 8 hits and 4 walks. And despite being on the road, from May 15 through May 17, the three starters each threw a complete game and allowed a combined two earned runs (a 0.67 ERA), 14 hits, and just one walk.

The Royals struggled to make headway in the divisional race through June and into late July. Between May 30 and July 21 they were 21–25 and fell to 7 1/2 games behind the Angels. With New York arriving in Kansas City to start a six-game home series on Monday, July 22, the Royals began a seven-game winning streak which was the longest in the season to that point. Dan Quisenberry picked up his 19th, 20th, and 21st saves as the Royals swept the Yankees, and he put in relief appearances in three of the next four games—picking up two more saves. On July 29, the Angels' lead had shrunk to 2 1/2 games. They would remain there through September 1 as the Royals were 16–14 during that period and the Angels were 17–15.

The eight-game winning streak (all at home) between September 2 and 8 was the longest of the season for the Royals. The streak included three games in extra innings. After winning five of their next seven games, the Royals achieved a 2 1/2-game lead over the Angels on September 15. However, the Mariners, who had given them trouble earlier in the year—winning five of their six previous contests—shut out the Royals twice in a four-game sweep in Kansas City, dropping the Royals into a tie for first place on September 19. Winning four of their next nine games, the Royals dropped a game behind the Angels on September 29.

After being swept at home in three games by the Twins and with only seven games remaining in the regular season, the Royals faced a four-game series at home versus the Angels. On September 30 the Royals won the first game 3–1 with Saberhagen pitching a complete game and giving up just one run on a home run by Doug DeCinces. Saberhagen collected ten strikeouts in the game and allowed only seven batters to reach first base. The Angels claimed the following game on October 1 by the score of 4–2 with Mike Witt pitching. The Royals won the third game on October 2 with Black pitching a complete-game shutout and allowing only five batters to reach first base. Three of the four runs scored by the Royals came in the bottom of the first inning with no outs as George Brett hit an inside-the-park home run to center field with two runners on base. The final game of the series on October 3 was won, 4–1, by the Royals with Quisenberry recording the final out of the game and his 36th save of the season. Starting pitcher Danny Jackson had given up just one run in 8 2/3 innings despite allowing 11 hits. The Royals' runs came on three home runs by Frank White, Steve Balboni, and Brett. With the win, the Royals had a one-game lead on the Angels.

The Royals hosted the Athletics for the final three games of the season while the Angels traveled to Arlington Stadium to battle the Rangers. On October 4, the Royals defeated the Athletics by the score of 4–2, and the Angels were shut out, 6–0, by the Rangers' starting pitcher Dave Schmidt. This gave the Royals a two-game lead and assured them of at least a tie for first. The division championship was claimed in a dramatic fashion on the following day as the Royals come from behind to defeat the Athletics in ten innings by the score of 5–4. The final game of the season on October 6 was a loss, and the Royals finished the season with a record of 91–71 (.562).

=== Season standings ===
AL West
Team	W	L	Pct.	GB	Home	Road
Kansas City Royals	91	71	.562	—	50‍–‍32	41‍–‍39
California Angels	90	72	.556	1	49‍–‍30	41‍–‍42
Chicago White Sox	85	77	.525	6	45‍–‍36	40‍–‍41
Minnesota Twins	77	85	.475	14	49‍–‍35	28‍–‍50
Oakland Athletics	77	85	.475	14	43‍–‍36	34‍–‍49
Seattle Mariners	74	88	.457	17	42‍–‍41	32‍–‍47
Texas Rangers	62	99	.385	28½	37‍–‍43	25‍–‍56

=== Record vs. opponents ===
1985 American League record Sources:
Team	BAL	BOS	CAL	CWS	CLE	DET	KC	MIL	MIN	NYY	OAK	SEA	TEX	TOR
Baltimore	—	5–8	7–5	8–4	8–5	6–7	6–6	9–4	6–6	1–12	7–5	6–6	10–2	4–8
Boston	8–5	—	5–7	4–8–1	8–5	6–7	5–7	5–8	7–5	5–8	8–4	6–6	5–7	9–4
California	5–7	7–5	—	8–5	8–4	8–4	4–9	9–3	9–4	3–9	6–7	9–4	9–4	5–7
Chicago	4–8	8–4–1	5–8	—	10–2	6–6	5–8	5–7	6–7	6–6	8–5	9–4	10–3	3–9
Cleveland	5–8	5–8	4–8	2–10	—	5–8	2–10	7–6	4–8	6–7	3–9	6–6	7–5	4–9
Detroit	7–6	7–6	4–8	6–6	8–5	—	5–7	9–4	3–9	9–3	8–4	5–7	7–5	6–7
Kansas City	6–6	7–5	9–4	8–5	10–2	7–5	—	8–4	7–6	5–7	8–5	3–10	6–7	7–5
Milwaukee	4–9	8–5	3–9	7–5	6–7	4–9	4–8	—	9–3	7–6	3–9	4–8	8–3	4–9
Minnesota	6–6	5–7	4–9	7–6	8–4	9–3	6–7	3–9	—	3–9	8–5	6–7	8–5	4–8
New York	12–1	8–5	9–3	6–6	7–6	3–9	7–5	6–7	9–3	—	7–5	9–3	8–4	6–7
Oakland	5–7	4–8	7–6	5–8	9–3	4–8	5–8	9–3	5–8	5–7	—	8–5	6–7	5–7
Seattle	6–6	6–6	4–9	4–9	6–6	7–5	10–3	8–4	7–6	3–9	5–8	—	6–7	2–10
Texas	2–10	7–5	4–9	3–10	5–7	5–7	7–6	3–8	5–8	4–8	7–6	7–6	—	3–9
Toronto	8–4	4–9	7–5	9–3	9–4	7–6	5–7	9–4	8–4	7–6	7–5	10–2	9–3	—

=== Notable transactions ===
- June 3, 1985: Brian McRae was drafted by the Kansas City Royals in the 1st round (17th pick) of the 1985 amateur draft. Player signed June 10, 1985.
- June 3, 1985: Chris Jelic was drafted by the Kansas City Royals in the 2nd round of the 1985 amateur draft.
- June 3, 1985: Deion Sanders was drafted by the Kansas City Royals in the 6th round of the 1985 amateur draft, but did not sign.

=== Opening Day Lineup ===
Opening Day Starters
#	Name	Position
6	Willie Wilson	CF
15	Pat Sheridan	RF
5	George Brett	3B
3	Jorge Orta	DH
45	Steve Balboni	1B
24	Darryl Motley	LF
20	Frank White	2B
8	Jim Sundberg	C
2	Onix Concepción	SS
40	Bud Black	P

=== Roster ===
1985 Kansas City Royals roster
Roster
Pitchers: 27 Joe Beckwith; 40 Bud Black; 26 Steve Farr; 41 Tony Ferreira; 23 Mark Gubicza; 32 Larry Gura; 38 Mark Huismann; 25 Danny Jackson; 17 Mike Jones; 30 Mike LaCoss; 37 Charlie Leibrandt; 22 Dennis Leonard; 29 Dan Quisenberry; 31 Bret Saberhagen	Catchers: 18 Jamie Quirk; 8 Jim Sundberg; 12 John Wathan; Infielders: 45 Steve Balboni; 1 Buddy Biancalana; 5 George Brett; 2 Onix Concepción; 61 Bob Hegman; 4 Greg Pryor; 16 Jim Scranton; 20 Frank White	Outfielders: 9 Dane Iorg; 35 Lynn Jones; 36 Dave Leeper; 28 Omar Moreno; 24 Darryl Motley; 15 Pat Sheridan; 21 Lonnie Smith; 6 Willie Wilson; Other batters: 11 Hal McRae; 3 Jorge Orta	Manager: 10 Dick Howser; Coaches: 43 Gary Blaylock (pitching); 41 Mike Ferraro (third base); 42 José Martínez (first base); 14 Lee May (hitting); 44 Jimmie Schaffer (bullpen)

=== All-Stars ===
- Dick Howser, Manager
- George Brett, 3B

== Game log ==
=== Regular season ===
Legend
Royals Win	Royals Loss	Game postponed	Clinched division

1985 regular season game log: 91–71 (Home: 50–32; Away: 41–39)
April: 11–8 (Home: 5–5; Away: 6–3)

#	Date	Time (CT)	Opponent	Score	Win	Loss	Save	Time of Game	Attendance	Record	Box/ Streak
1	April 8	1:35 p.m. CST	Blue Jays	2–1	Black (1–0)	Stieb (0–1)	Quisenberry (1)	2:30	41,086	1–0	W1
2	April 10	7:35 p.m. CST	Blue Jays	0–1 (10)	Caudill (1–0)	Beckwith (0–1)	Lavelle (1)	2:52	14,740	1–1	L1
3	April 11	7:35 p.m. CST	Blue Jays	3–4 (10)	Caudill (2–0)	Quisenberry (0–1)	Acker (1)	3:14	17,798	1–2	L2
4	April 13	12:20 p.m. CST	Tigers	1–3	Morris (2–0)	Black (1–1)	—	2:35	21,823	1–3	L3
5	April 14	1:35 p.m. CST	Tigers	1–5	Petry (2–0)	Saberhagen (0–1)	Hernández (2)	2:31	24,447	1–4	L4
6	April 16	7:35 p.m. CST	Red Sox	2–0	Jackson (1–0)	Clemens (1–1)	—	2:09	16,886	2–4	W1
7	April 17	7:35 p.m. CST	Red Sox	6–1	Leibrandt (1–0)	Nipper (0–1)	—	2:38	18,685	3–4	W2
8	April 18	7:35 p.m. CST	Red Sox	3–4 (14)	Ojeda (1–0)	Jones (0–1)	—	4:11	22,587	3–5	L1
9	April 19	6:35 p.m. CST	@ Tigers	9–2	Saberhagen (1–1)	Petry (2–1)	—	2:35	35,432	4–5	W1
10	April 20	12:15 p.m. CST	@ Tigers	3–4	Hernández (2–0)	Quisenberry (0–2)	—	2:30	27,339	4–6	L1
11	April 21	12:30 p.m. CST	@ Tigers	3–2 (13)	Quisenberry (1–2)	Berenguer (0–1)	Gura (1)	4:05	30,168	5–6	W1
12	April 22	6:35 p.m. CST	@ Blue Jays	2–0	Leibrandt (2–0)	Stieb (1–2)	—	2:13	20,281	6–6	W2
13	April 23	6:35 p.m. CST	@ Blue Jays	7–6	Beckwith (1–1)	Caudill (3–2)	Quisenberry (2)	2:46	18,491	7–6	W3
14	April 24	12:35 p.m. CST	@ Blue Jays	2–10	Leal (1–1)	Saberhagen (1–2)	—	2:17	18,006	7–7	L1
15	April 26	6:35 p.m. CST	@ Red Sox	2–5	Clemens (2–2)	Gubicza (0–1)	—	2:40	26,647	7–8	L2
16	April 27	12:20 p.m. CST	@ Red Sox	5–4	Quisenberry (2–2)	Stanley (0–2)	—	3:03	24,430	8–8	W1
17	April 28	1:05 p.m. CDT	@ Red Sox	5–2	Leibrandt (3–0)	Boyd (2–1)	Beckwith (1)	2:43	23,882	9–8	W2
18	April 29	7:35 p.m. CDT	Indians	W 3–2	Black (2–1)	Heaton (1–1)	Quisenberry (3)	2:36	19,295	10–8	W3
19	April 30	7:35 p.m. CDT	Indians	W 5–1	Saberhagen (2–2)	Roan (0–4)	—	2:27	16,282	11–8	W4

May: 14–13 (Home: 7–5; Away: 7–8)

#	Date	Time (CT)	Opponent	Score	Win	Loss	Save	Time of Game	Attendance	Record	Box/ Streak
20	May 1	7:35 p.m. CDT	Indians	L 5–6	Schulze (3–0)	Gubicza (0–2)	Waddell (5)	3:23	16,699	11–9	L1
21	May 3	7:00 p.m. CDT	@ Yankees	1–7	Rasmussen (1–1)	Jackson (1–1)	—	2:36	20,603	11–10	L2
22	May 4	1:00 p.m. CDT	@ Yankees	2–5	Guidry (2–3)	Leibrandt (3–1)	—	2:14	22,532	11–11	L3
23	May 5	1:00 p.m. CDT	@ Yankees	2–6	Niekro (4–2)	Black (2–2)	Righetti (7)	2:33	50,209	11–12	L4
24	May 7	7:35 p.m. CDT	Orioles	2–4	Dixon (3–0)	Saberhagen (2–3)	Stewart (5)	2:14	21,664	11–13	L5
25	May 8	7:35 p.m. CDT	Orioles	9–8	LaCoss (1–0)	McGregor (1–3)	—	2:54	19,793	12–13	W1
26	May 10	7:35 p.m. CDT	Yankees	4–6	Guidry (3–3)	Leibrandt (3–2)	Righetti (8)	2:48	34,000	12–14	L1
27	May 11	3:05 p.m. CDT	Yankees	3–11	Rasmussen (2–1)	Black (2–3)	—	2:35	38,011	12–15	L2
28	May 12	1:35 p.m. CDT	Yankees	6–5	Quisenberry (3–2)	Righetti (1–2)	—	3:04	31,009	13–15	W1
29	May 13	6:35 p.m. CDT	@ Orioles	5–2	Jackson (2–1)	Davis (1–1)	Quisenberry (4)	2:41	24,611	14–15	W2
30	May 14	6:35 p.m. CDT	@ Orioles	5–3	Gubicza (1–2)	McGregor (1–4)	Quisenberry (5)	2:32	22,202	15–15	W3
31	May 15	6:35 p.m. CDT	@ Indians	W 5–1	Leibrandt (4–2)	Schulze (3–3)	—	2:35	4,169	16–15	W4
32	May 16	6:35 p.m. CDT	@ Indians	W 7–1	Black (3–3)	Creel (0–1)	—	2:25	3,051	17–15	W5
33	May 17	7:35 p.m. CDT	@ Brewers	W 3–0	Saberhagen (3–3)	Darwin (3–3)	—	2:14	10,587	18–15	W6
34	May 18	1:35 p.m. CDT	@ Brewers	L 2–7	Haas (4–2)	Jackson (2–2)	—	2:28	20,334	18–16	L1
35	May 19	1:35 p.m. CDT	@ Brewers	L 10–11	Gibson (4–1)	Quisenberry (3–3)	—	3:37	43,256	18–17	L2
36	May 20	7:35 p.m. CDT	@ Rangers	L 7–8	Schmidt (2–2)	Beckwith (1–2)	—	2:49	18,945	18–18	L3
37	May 21	7:35 p.m. CDT	@ Rangers	W 5–0	Black (4–3)	Tanana (0–5)	—	2:07	14,018	19–18	W1
38	May 22	7:35 p.m. CDT	@ Rangers	W 6–3	Saberhagen (4–3)	Noles (2–5)	Quisenberry (6)	2:28	15,447	20–18	W2
39	May 24	7:35 p.m. CDT	White Sox	8–4	Jackson (3–2)	Burns (5–4)	Quisenberry (7)	3:01	32,599	21–18	W3
40	May 25	12:20 p.m. CDT	White Sox	3–0	Leibrandt (5–2)	Seaver (4–3)	—	2:01	25,920	22–18	W4
41	May 26	1:35 p.m. CDT	White Sox	3–2	Black (5–3)	James (1–2)	Quisenberry (8)	2:33	32,563	23–18	W5
42	May 27	7:35 p.m. CDT	Rangers	W 4–2	Saberhagen (5–3)	Noles (2–6)	Quisenberry (9)	2:19	30,803	24–18	W6
43	May 28	7:35 p.m. CDT	Rangers	L 1–6	Hooton (2–1)	Gubicza (1–3)	—	2:39	19,160	24–19	L1
44	May 29	7:35 p.m. CDT	Rangers	W 6–2	Jackson (4–2)	Hough (4–4)	Quisenberry (10)	2:17	20,692	25–19	W1
45	May 30	7:30 p.m. CDT	@ White Sox	3–4	Seaver (5–3)	Leibrandt (5–3)	James (9)	2:40	16,041	25–20	L1
46	May 31	7:30 p.m. CDT	@ White Sox	3–8	Bannister (3–4)	Black (5–4)	Nelson (1)	2:39	25,493	25–21	L2

June: 12–14 (Home: 5–6; Away: 7–8)

#	Date	Time (CT)	Opponent	Score	Win	Loss	Save	Time of Game	Attendance	Record	Box/ Streak
47	June 1	6:00 p.m. CDT	@ White Sox	7–8	James (2–2)	Jones (0–2)	—	3:19	32,398	25–22	L3
48	June 2	1:30 p.m. CDT	@ White Sox	1–4	Dotson (3–3)	Gubicza (1–4)	James (10)	2:33	23,153	25–23	L4
—	June 3		Brewers	Postponed (Rain) (Makeup date: September 5)							
49	June 4	7:35 p.m. CDT	Brewers	W 4–3	Leibrandt (6–3)	Vuckovich (1–3)	LaCoss (1)	2:26	18,788	26–23	W1
50	June 5	7:35 p.m. CDT	Brewers	L 2–10	Higuera (4–3)	Black (5–5)	—	2:25	18,666	26–24	L1
51	June 7	9:30 p.m. CDT	@ Angels	6–0	Saberhagen (6–3)	Witt (3–6)	—	2:26	29,414	27–24	W1
52	June 8	9:00 p.m. CDT	@ Angels	4–1	Gubicza (2–4)	Slaton (4–4)	Quisenberry (11)	2:19	46,393	28–24	W2
53	June 9	3:00 p.m. CDT	@ Angels	0–1	Romanick (7–2)	Jackson (4–3)	Moore (12)	2:04	41,973	28–25	L1
54	June 10	9:35 p.m. CDT	@ Athletics	1–2 (10)	Howell (5–3)	Quisenberry (3–4)	—	3:33	16,500	28–26	L2
55	June 11	9:35 p.m. CDT	@ Athletics	3–4	Howell (6–3)	Black (5–6)	—	2:43	7,201	28–27	L3
56	June 12	2:15 p.m. CDT	@ Athletics	3–2 (14)	Jones (1–2)	McCatty (2–3)	—	4:19	11,010	29–27	W1
57	June 13	9:35 p.m. CDT	@ Mariners	W 4–3	Gubicza (3–4)	Wilkinson (0–1)	Quisenberry (12)	2:41	8,691	30–27	W2
58	June 14	9:35 p.m. CDT	@ Mariners	L 5–13	Wills (2–0)	Jackson (4–4)	—	3:10	10,765	30–28	L1
59	June 15	9:05 p.m. CDT	@ Mariners	L 1–2	Young (5–8)	Leibrandt (6–4)	Vande Berg (3)	2:34	26,067	30–29	L2
60	June 16	3:35 p.m. CDT	@ Mariners	L 1–2	Best (2–1)	Beckwith (1–3)	—	2:34	14,103	30–30	L3
61	June 17	7:35 p.m. CDT	Twins	10–3	Saberhagen (7–3)	Viola (7–6)	—	2:15	31,885	31–30	W1
62	June 18	7:35 p.m. CDT	Twins	10–3	Gubicza (4–4)	Smithson (5–6)	—	2:36	21,662	32–30	W2
63	June 19	7:35 p.m. CDT	Twins	3–2	Jackson (5–4)	Filson (3–4)	Quisenberry (13)	2:17	22,033	33–30	W3
64	June 20	7:35 p.m. CDT	Twins	8–11	Eufemia (1–0)	Beckwith (1–4)	Whitehouse (1)	3:32	31,461	33–31	L1
—	June 21		Mariners	Postponed (Rain) (Makeup date: September 19)							
65	June 22	7:35 p.m. CDT	Mariners	L 1–2	Swift (2–1)	Saberhagen (6–4)	Núñez (7)	2:35	35,959	33–32	L2
66	June 23	1:35 p.m. CDT	Mariners	L 2–8	Moore (5–4)	Black (5–7)	—	2:54	31,080	33–33	L3
67	June 24	7:35 p.m. CDT	@ Twins	12–6	Gubicza (5–4)	Filson (3–5)	—	3:08	24,035	34–33	W1
68	June 25	7:35 p.m. CDT	@ Twins	3–0	Jackson (6–4)	Butcher (4–7)	—	2:04	31,885	35–33	W2
69	June 26	7:35 p.m. CDT	@ Twins	1–2	Schrom (7–5)	Leibrandt (6–5)	—	2:14	20,060	35–34	L1
70	June 28	7:35 p.m. CDT	Angels	5–4 (14)	Quisenberry (4–4)	Corbett (2–1)	—	4:50	32,651	36–34	W1
71	June 29	7:35 p.m. CDT	Angels	1–7	Lugo (3–1)	Black (5–8)	—	2:46	39,451	36–35	L1
72	June 30	1:35 p.m. CDT	Angels	3–1	Gubicza (6–4)	Romanick (8–4)	Quisenberry (14)	2:23	33,173	37–35	W1

July: 17–10 (Home: 9–4; Away: 8–6)

#	Date	Time (CT)	Opponent	Score	Win	Loss	Save	Time of Game	Attendance	Record	Box/ Streak
73	July 1	7:35 p.m. CDT	Athletics	3–4	Atherton (4–4)	Jackson (6–5)	Howell (17)	2:59	31,781	37–36	L1
74	July 2	7:35 p.m. CDT	Athletics	10–1	Leibrandt (7–5)	Langford (0–2)	—	2:29	19,676	38–36	W1
75	July 3	7:35 p.m. CDT	Athletics	3–0	Saberhagen (8–4)	Codiroli (8–4)	Quisenberry (13)	2:17	22,142	39–36	W2
76	July 4	7:35 p.m. CDT	Orioles	3–5	Martínez (7–5)	Black (5–9)	Snell (4)	2:26	40,616	39–37	L1
77	July 5	7:35 p.m. CDT	Orioles	3–6	Boddicker (9–7)	Gubicza (6–5)	Stewart (6)	2:42	30,488	39–38	L2
78	July 6	1:20 p.m. CDT	Orioles	L 3–8	McGregor (7–7)	Jackson (6–6)	—	2:44	26,898	39–39	L3
79	July 7	1:35 p.m. CDT	Orioles	8–4	Leibrandt (8–5)	Davis (1–1)	Quisenberry (16)	2:52	24,131	40–39	W1
80	July 8	7:10 p.m. CDT	@ Yankees	5–2	Saberhagen (9–4)	Niekro (7–8)	—	2:16	17,193	41–39	W2
81	July 9	7:00 p.m. CDT	@ Yankees	4–6	Guidry (11–3)	Black (5–10)	Righetti (15)	3:11	24,528	41–40	L1
82	July 10	12 Noon CDT	@ Yankees	5–6	Righetti (7–6)	Quisenberry (4–5)	—	2:53	35,274	41–41	L2
83	July 11	6:35 p.m. CDT	@ Indians	W 1–0	Jackson (7–6)	Ruhle (2–4)	—	2:26	5,256	42–41	W1
84	July 12	6:35 p.m. CDT	@ Indians	L 4–5 (11)	Waddell (4–5)	Quisenberry (4–6)	—	3:22	8,058	42–42	L1
85	July 13	6:35 p.m. CDT	@ Indians	W 5–1	Saberhagen (10–4)	Blyleven (8–9)	—	2:20	12,794	43–42	W1
86	July 14	12:35 p.m. CDT	@ Indians	W 9–5	Black (6–10)	Heaton (5–11)	Quisenberry (17)	3:14	25,466	44–42	W2
56th All-Star Game in Minneapolis, MN
87	July 18	6:35 p.m. CDT	@ Orioles	3–8	McGregor (8–7)	Saberhagen (10–5)	Stewart (7)	2:53	25,579	44–43	L1
88	July 19	7:05 p.m. CDT	@ Orioles	10–3	Leibrandt (9–5)	Boddicker (9–10)	—	2:45	29,410	45–43	W1
89	July 20	12:20 p.m. CDT	@ Orioles	7–5	Jackson (8–6)	Flanagan (0–1)	Quisenberry (18)	2:40	26,366	46–43	W2
90	July 21	1:05 p.m. CDT	@ Orioles	4–6	Martinez (2–2)	Black (6–11)	Aase (4)	2:51	31,278	46–44	L1
91	July 22	7:10 p.m. CDT	Yankees	5–4	Jones (2–2)	Rasmussen (3–5)	Quisenberry (19)	2:56	40,938	47–44	W1
92	July 23	7:35 p.m. CDT	Yankees	5–2	Saberhagen (11–5)	Whitson (5–7)	Quisenberry (20)	2:40	32,450	48–44	W2
93	July 24	7:35 p.m. CDT	Yankees	5–3	Leibrandt (10–5)	Cowley (8–4)	Quisenberry (21)	2:45	31,580	49–44	W3
94	July 26	7:35 p.m. CDT	Indians	W 7–1	Jackson (9–6)	Romero (0–1)	—	2:43	27,860	50–44	W4
95	July 27	7:35 p.m. CDT	Indians	W 6–3	Black (7–11)	Reed (0–3)	Quisenberry (22)	2:23	33,473	51–44	W5
96	July 28	1:35 p.m. CDT	Indians	W 7–4	Gubicza (7–5)	Ruhle (2–7)	Quisenberry (23)	2:36	38,352	52–44	W6
97	July 29	7:10 p.m. CDT	@ Tigers	4–2	Saberhagen (12–5)	Petry (11–10)	—	2:48	36,068	53–44	W7
98	July 30	6:35 p.m. CDT	@ Tigers	7–11	Morris (12–6)	Leibrandt (10–6)	Hernández (21)	3:27	34,261	53–45	L1
99	July 31	12:30 p.m. CDT	@ Tigers	5–2	Jackson (10–6)	Terrell (10–6)	Quisenberry (24)	2:30	34,276	54–45	W1

August: 15–12 (Home: 8–7; Away: 7–5)

#	Date	Time (CT)	Opponent	Score	Win	Loss	Save	Time of Game	Attendance	Record	Box/ Streak
100	August 2	7:35 p.m. CDT	Red Sox	4–3 (10)	Quisenberry (5–6)	Clear (1–2)	—	3:04	37,212	55–45	W2
101	August 3	7:35 p.m. CDT	Red Sox	4–5	Clemens (7–4)	Gubicza (7–6)	Crawford (4)	3:15	40,370	55–46	L1
102	August 4	1:35 p.m. CDT	Red Sox	5–6 (12)	Stanley (6–5)	LaCoss (1–1)	Clear (3)	3:48	31,020	55–47	L2
103	August 5	7:35 p.m. CDT	Tigers	4–8	Terrell (11–6)	Jackson (10–7)	Hernández (22)	2:53	41,251	55–48	L3
—	August 6		Tigers	Postponed (Strike) (Makeup date: August 8)							
—	August 7		Tigers	Postponed (Strike) (Makeup date: August 19)							
104	August 8 (1)	5:05 p.m. CDT	Tigers	10–3	Saberhagen (13–5)	Tanana (6–11)	—	2:39	—	56–48	W1
105	August 8 (2)	8:19 p.m. CDT	Tigers	6–4	Gubicza (8–6)	Petry (12–11)	Quisenberry (25)	3:04	35,585	57–48	W2
106	August 9	7:35 p.m. CDT	Blue Jays	4–2	Black (8–11)	Stieb (10–8)	—	2:21	25,868	58–48	W3
107	August 10	7:35 p.m. CDT	Blue Jays	4–3 (10)	Quisenberry (6–6)	Caudill (4–5)	—	2:54	34,448	59–48	W4
108	August 11	1:35 p.m. CDT	Blue Jays	3–5 (10)	Henke (3–0)	Beckwith (1–5)	—	3:27	27,457	59–49	L1
109	August 12	6:35 p.m. CDT	@ Red Sox	3–2	Gubicza (9–6)	Nipper (7–8)	Quisenberry (26)	2:39	22,843	60–49	W1
110	August 13	6:35 p.m. CDT	@ Red Sox	6–3	Saberhagen (14–5)	Ojeda (5–7)	Quisenberry (27)	3:03	23,189	61–49	W2
111	August 14	6:35 p.m. CDT	@ Red Sox	3–16	Hurst (8–9)	Black (8–12)	—	2:56	22,870	61–50	L1
112	August 16	6:35 p.m. CDT	@ Blue Jays	4–2	Leibrandt (11–6)	Key (9–5)	—	2:31	38,269	62–50	W1
113	August 17	12:20 p.m. CDT	@ Blue Jays	4–2	Jackson (11–7)	Alexander (12–7)	Quisenberry (28)	2:21	42,313	63–50	W2
114	August 18	12:35 p.m. CDT	@ Blue Jays	6–10	Gubicza (9–7)	Filer (6–0)	—	3:02	37,458	63–51	L1
115	August 19	7:35 p.m. CDT	Tigers	2–1 (10)	Saberhagen (15–5)	Morris (13–7)	—	2:42	20,929	64–51	W1
116	August 20	7:30 p.m. CDT	@ White Sox	1–2	James (5–5)	Quisenberry (6–7)	—	2:46	19,318	64–52	L1
117	August 21	7:30 p.m. CDT	@ White Sox	2–1	Leibrandt (12–6)	Bannister (5–11)	Quisenberry (29)	2:51	16,243	65–52	W1
118	August 22	7:30 p.m. CDT	@ White Sox	7–3	Jackson (12–7)	Davis (1–1)	Quisenberry (30)	3:05	22,505	66–52	W2
119	August 23	7:35 p.m. CDT	Rangers	L 3–4	Schmidt (5–3)	Quisenberry (6–8)	—	3:05	33,483	66–53	L1
120	August 24	7:35 p.m. CDT	Rangers	W 8–2	Saberhagen (16–5)	Hooton (5–8)	—	2:33	39,100	67–53	W1
121	August 25	1:35 p.m. CDT	Rangers	L 3–7	Hough (13–12)	Black (8–13)	—	3:00	28,350	67–54	L1
122	August 26	7:35 p.m. CDT	Rangers	W 9–2	Leibrandt (13–6)	Russell (1–4)	—	2:44	28,085	68–54	W1
123	August 27	7:35 p.m. CDT	@ Brewers	L 5–8	Cocanower (4–3)	Jackson (12–8)	Gibson (10)	2:48	8,034	68–55	L1
124	August 28	7:35 p.m. CDT	@ Brewers	W 8–2	Gubicza (10–7)	Vuckovich (6–10)	—	2:38	7,626	69–55	W1
—	August 29		@ Brewers	Postponed (Rain; Site change) (Makeup date: September 6)							
125	August 30	7:35 p.m. CDT	@ Rangers	L 1–4	Hough (14–12)	Black (8–14)	—	2:18	14,330	69–56	L1
126	August 31	7:35 p.m. CDT	@ Rangers	L 4–6	Harris (4–3)	Leibrandt (13–7)	—	2:34	14,709	69–57	L2

September: 18–12 (Home: 11–5; Away: 7–7)

#	Date	Time (CT)	Opponent	Score	Win	Loss	Save	Time of Game	Attendance	Record	Box/ Streak
127	September 1	6:05 p.m. CDT	@ Rangers	L 3–5	Mason (6–12)	Jackson (12–9)	Henry (1)	2:04	10,587	69–58	L3
128	September 2	7:35 p.m. CDT	White Sox	3–2	Gubicza (1–3)	Nelson (8–9)	Quisenberry (31)	2:46	32,681	70–58	W1
129	September 3	7:35 p.m. CDT	White Sox	3–2	Saberhagen (17–5)	Seaver (12–10)	—	2:10	17,521	71–58	W2
130	September 4	7:35 p.m. CDT	White Sox	6–5 (10)	Jones (3–2)	James (6–6)	—	3:38	19,940	72–58	W3
131	September 5	7:35 p.m. CDT	Brewers	W 4–1	Leibrandt (14–7)	Haas (4–2)	—	2:14	2,527	73–58	W4
132	September 6 (1)	5:05 p.m. CDT	Brewers	W 4–3 (11)	Quisenberry (7–8)	Fingers (1–5)	—	2:48	—	74–58	W5
133	September 6 (2)	8:28 p.m. CDT	Brewers	W 7–1	Farr (1–0)	Burris (9–11)	—	2:34	26,403	75–58	W6
134	September 7	7:35 p.m. CDT	Brewers	W 7–4	Gubicza (12–7)	Cocanower (4–5)	Quisenberry (32)	2:46	29,510	76–58	W7
135	September 8	1:35 p.m. CDT	Brewers	W 13–11 (11)	Farr (2–0)	Fingers (1–6)	—	3:48	20,737	77–58	W8
136	September 9	9:30 p.m. CDT	@ Angels	1–7	Candelaria (5–1)	Saberhagen (17–6)	—	1:57	29,688	77–59	L1
137	September 10	9:30 p.m. CDT	@ Angels	6–0	Leibrandt (15–7)	McCaskill (9–11)	—	2:12	37,813	78–59	W1
138	September 11	9:30 p.m. CDT	@ Angels	2–1	Jackson (13–9)	Romanick (13–8)	Quisenberry (33)	2:41	32,906	79–59	W2
139	September 13	9:35 p.m. CDT	@ Athletics	5–2	Gubicza (13–7)	Rijo (3–3)	Quisenberry (34)	2:45	11,253	80–59	W3
140	September 14	3:05 p.m. CDT	@ Athletics	2–1	Saberhagen (18–6)	John (4–8)	—	2:22	30,628	81–59	W4
141	September 15 (1)	2:15 p.m. CDT	@ Athletics	2–4	Codiroli (12–12)	Leibrandt (15–8)	Howell (25)	2:23	—	81–60	L1
142	September 15 (2)	5:13 p.m. CDT	@ Athletics	7–2	Black (9–14)	Young (0–3)	—	2:31	15,236	82–60	W1
143	September 16	7:35 p.m. CDT	Mariners	L 1–5	Moore (15–8)	Jackson (13–10)	—	2:33	21,666	82–61	L1
144	September 17	7:35 p.m. CDT	Mariners	L 0–7	Young (12–15)	Farr (2–1)	—	2:36	17,770	82–62	L2
145	September 18	7:35 p.m. CDT	Mariners	L 0–6	Thomas (7–0)	Gubicza (13–8)	—	2:58	16,863	82–63	L3
146	September 19	7:35 p.m. CDT	Mariners	L 4–6	Núñez (7–2)	Quisenberry (7–9)	Tobik (1)	3:00	7,633	82–64	L4
147	September 20	7:35 p.m. CDT	Twins	5–1	Leibrandt (16–8)	Blyleven (14–16)	—	2:42	22,845	83–64	W1
148	September 21	7:35 p.m. CDT	Twins	6–5 (10)	Huismann (1–0)	Davis (2–6)	—	3:11	25,102	84–64	W2
149	September 22	1:35 p.m. CDT	Twins	3–7	Viola (16–14)	Jackson (12–12)	—	2:31	21,277	84–65	L1
150	September 24	9:35 p.m. CDT	@ Mariners	L 2–5	Moore (16–8)	Gubicza (13–9)	—	2:26	6,433	84–66	L2
151	September 25	9:35 p.m. CDT	@ Mariners	W 5–4	Saberhagen (19–6)	Young (12–17)	Farr (1)	2:55	6,588	85–66	W1
152	September 26	9:35 p.m. CDT	@ Mariners	W 5–2	Leibrandt (17–8)	Swift (5–10)	Quisenberry (35)	2:48	6,840	86–66	W2
153	September 27	7:35 p.m. CDT	@ Twins	1–4	Viola (17–14)	Black (9–15)	—	2:01	13,035	86–67	L1
154	September 28	11:00 a.m. CDT	@ Twins	3–5	Burtt (2–1)	Jackson (13–12)	Davis (24)	2:31	13,256	86–68	L2
155	September 29	1:15 p.m. CDT	@ Twins	3–6	Butcher (11–14)	Gubicza (13–10)	Davis (25)	2:43	11,292	86–69	L3
156	September 30	7:35 p.m. CDT	Angels	3–1	Saberhagen (20–6)	Candelaria (6–3)	—	2:09	34,200	87–69	W1

October: 4–2 (Home: 4–2; Away: 0–0)

#	Date	Time (CT)	Opponent	Score	Win	Loss	Save	Time of Game	Attendance	Record	Box/ Streak
157	October 1	7:35 p.m. CDT	Angels	2–4	Witt (14–9)	Leibrandt (17–9)	Moore (30)	2:36	26,273	87–70	L1
158	October 2	7:35 p.m. CDT	Angels	4–0	Black (10–15)	Romanick (14–9)	—	2:08	28,401	88–70	W1
159	October 3	7:35 p.m. CDT	Angels	4–1	Jackson (14–12)	Sutton (15–10)	Quisenberry (36)	2:24	40,894	89–70	W2
160	October 4	7:35 p.m. CDT	Athletics	4–2	Gubicza (14–10)	Rijo (6–4)	Quisenberry (37)	2:32	19,694	90–70	W3
161	October 5	7:35 p.m. CDT	Athletics	5–4 (10)	Quisenberry (8–9)	Howell (9–8)	—	3:23	32,949	91–70	W4
162	October 6	1:35 p.m. CDT	Athletics	3–9	Codiroli (14–14)	Jones (3–3)	Mura (1)	2:36	20,935	91–71	L1

*An MLB Players strike forced the cancellation of all regular season games on August 6 and 7. Most games were made up later in the season.

=== Detailed records ===
American League
Opponent	Home	Away	Total	Pct.	Runs scored	Runs allowed
AL East
Baltimore Orioles	2–4	4–2	6–6	0.500	62	62
Boston Red Sox	3–3	4–2	7–5	0.583	48	51
Cleveland Indians	5–1	5–1	10–2	0.833	64	30
Detroit Tigers	3–3	4–2	7–5	0.583	55	47
Milwaukee Brewers	6–1	2–3	8–4	0.667	69	61
New York Yankees	4–2	1–5	5–7	0.417	47	63
Toronto Blue Jays	3–3	4–2	7–5	0.583	41	46
Div Total	26–17	24–17	50–34	0.595	386	360
AL West
California Angels	5–2	4–2	9–4	0.692	41	28
Chicago White Sox	6–0	2–5	9–4	0.692	50	45
Kansas City Royals	—	—	—	—	—	—
Minnesota Twins	5–2	2–4	7–6	0.538	68	53
Oakland Athletics	4–2	4–3	8–5	0.615	51	37
Seattle Mariners	0–6	3–4	3–10	0.231	31	65
Texas Rangers	4–3	2–4	6–7	0.462	60	51
Div Total	24–15	17–22	41–37	0.526	301	279
Season Total	50–31	41–39	91–71	0.562	687	639

Month	Games	Won	Lost	Win %	RS	RA
April	19	11	8	0.579	64	57
May	27	14	13	0.519	120	122
June	26	12	14	0.462	101	102
July	27	17	10	0.630	141	107
August	27	15	12	0.556	123	116
September	30	18	12	0.600	116	115
October	6	4	2	0.667	22	20
Total	162	91	71	0.562	687	639

	Games	Won	Lost	Win %	RS	RA
Home	82	50	32	0.610	357	317
Away	80	41	39	0.513	330	322
Total	162	91	71	0.562	687	639

=== Composite Box ===
1985 Kansas City Royals Inning–by–Inning Boxscore
Team	1	2	3	4	5	6	7	8	9	10	11	12	13	14	R	H	E
Opponents
Royals

=== Postseason Game log ===
Legend
Royals Win	Royals Loss	Game postponed

1985 Postseason game log: 8–6 (Home: 4–3; Away: 4–3)
AL Championship Series: vs. Toronto Blue Jays 4–3 (Home: 2–1; Away: 2–2)

#	Date	Time (CT)	Opponent	Score	Win	Loss	Save	Time of Game	Attendance	Series	Box/ Streak
1	October 8	7:30 p.m. CDT	@ Blue Jays	1–6	Stieb (1–0)	Leibrandt (0–1)	—	2:24	39,115	TOR 1–0	L1
2	October 9	2:05 p.m. CDT	@ Blue Jays	5–6 (10)	Henke (1–0)	Quisenberry (0–1)	—	3:39	34,029	TOR 2–0	L2
3	October 11	7:15 p.m. CDT	Blue Jays	6–5	Farr (1–0)	Clancy (0–1)	—	2:51	40,224	TOR 2–1	W1
4	October 12	7:15 p.m. CDT	Blue Jays	1–3	Henke (2–0)	Leibrandt (0–2)	—	3:02	41,112	TOR 3–1	L1
5	October 13	3:35 p.m. CDT	Blue Jays	2–0	Jackson (1–0)	Key (0–1)	—	2:21	40,046	TOR 3–2	W1
6	October 15	7:15 p.m. CDT	@ Blue Jays	5–3	Gubicza (1–0)	Alexander (0–1)	Quisenberry (1)	3:12	37,557	Tied 3–3	W2
7	October 16	7:15 p.m. CDT	@ Blue Jays	6–2	Leibrandt (1–2)	Stieb (1–1)	—	2:49	32,084	KC 4–3	W3

World Series: vs. St. Louis Cardinals 4–3 (Home: 2–2; Away: 2–1)

#	Date	Time (CT)	Opponent	Score	Win	Loss	Save	Time of Game	Attendance	Series	Box/ Streak
1	October 19	7:35 p.m. CDT	Cardinals	1–3	Tudor (1–0)	Jackson (0–1)	Worrell (1)	2:48	41,650	STL 1–0	L1
2	October 20	7:30 p.m. CDT	Cardinals	2–4	Dayley (1–0)	Leibrandt (0–1)	Lahti (1)	2:44	41,656	STL 2–0	L2
3	October 22	7:35 p.m. CDT	@ Cardinals	6–1	Saberhagen (1–0)	Andújar (0–1)	—	2:59	53,634	STL 2–1	W1
4	October 23	7:25 p.m. CDT	@ Cardinals	0–3	Tudor (2–0)	Black (0–1)	—	2:19	53,634	STL 3–1	L1
5	October 24	7:25 p.m. CDT	@ Cardinals	6–1	Jackson (1–1)	Forsch (0–1)	—	2:52	53,634	STL 3–2	W1
6	October 26	7:25 p.m. CDT	Cardinals	2–1	Quisenberry (1–0)	Worrell (0–1)	—	2:47	41,628	Tied 3–3	W2
7	October 27	7:30 p.m. CST	Cardinals	11–0	Saberhagen (2–0)	Tudor (2–1)	—	2:46	41,658	KC 4–3	W3

== Postseason ==
=== ALCS ===
==== Game 1 ====
Tuesday, October 8, 1985, at Exhibition Stadium in Toronto, Ontario

Team	1	2	3	4	5	6	7	8	9	R	H	E
Kansas City	0	0	0	0	0	0	0	0	1	1	5	1
Toronto	0	2	3	1	0	0	0	0	X	6	11	0
WP: Dave Stieb (1–0) LP: Charlie Leibrandt (0–1)

==== Game 2 ====
Wednesday, October 9, 1985, at Exhibition Stadium in Toronto, Ontario

Team	1	2	3	4	5	6	7	8	9	10	R	H	E
Kansas City	0	0	2	1	0	0	0	0	1	1	5	10	3
Toronto	0	0	0	1	0	2	0	1	0	2	6	10	0
WP: Tom Henke (1–0) LP: Dan Quisenberry (0–1); Home runs: KCR: Willie Wilson (1), Pat Sheridan (1); TOR: None

==== Game 3 ====
Friday, October 11, 1985, at Royals Stadium in Kansas City, Missouri

Team	1	2	3	4	5	6	7	8	9	R	H	E
Toronto	0	0	0	0	5	0	0	0	0	5	13	1
Kansas City	1	0	0	1	1	2	0	1	X	6	10	1
WP: Steve Farr (1–0) LP: Jim Clancy (0–1); Home runs: TOR: Rance Mulliniks (1), Jesse Barfield (1); KCR: George Brett 2 (2), Jim Sundberg (1)

==== Game 4 ====
Saturday, October 12, 1985, at Royals Stadium in Kansas City, Missouri

Team	1	2	3	4	5	6	7	8	9	R	H	E
Toronto	0	0	0	0	0	0	0	0	3	3	7	0
Kansas City	0	0	0	0	0	1	0	0	0	1	2	0
WP: Tom Henke (2–0) LP: Charlie Leibrandt (0–2)

==== Game 5 ====
Sunday, October 13, 1985, at Royals Stadium in Kansas City, Missouri

Team	1	2	3	4	5	6	7	8	9	R	H	E
Toronto	0	0	0	0	0	0	0	0	0	0	8	0
Kansas City	1	1	0	0	0	0	0	0	X	2	8	0
WP: Danny Jackson (1–0) LP: Jimmy Key (0–1)

==== Game 6 ====
Tuesday, October 15, 1985, at Exhibition Stadium in Toronto, Ontario

Team	1	2	3	4	5	6	7	8	9	R	H	E
Kansas City	1	0	1	0	1	2	0	0	0	5	8	1
Toronto	1	0	1	0	0	1	0	0	0	3	8	2
WP: Mark Gubicza (1–0) LP: Doyle Alexander (0–1) Sv: Dan Quisenberry (1); Home runs: KCR: George Brett (3); TOR: None

==== Game 7 ====
Wednesday, October 16, 1985, at Exhibition Stadium in Toronto, Ontario

Team	1	2	3	4	5	6	7	8	9	R	H	E
Kansas City	0	1	0	1	0	4	0	0	0	6	8	0
Toronto	0	0	0	0	1	0	0	0	1	2	8	1
WP: Charlie Leibrandt (1–2) LP: Dave Stieb (1–1); Home runs: KCR: Pat Sheridan (2); TOR: None

=== World Series ===
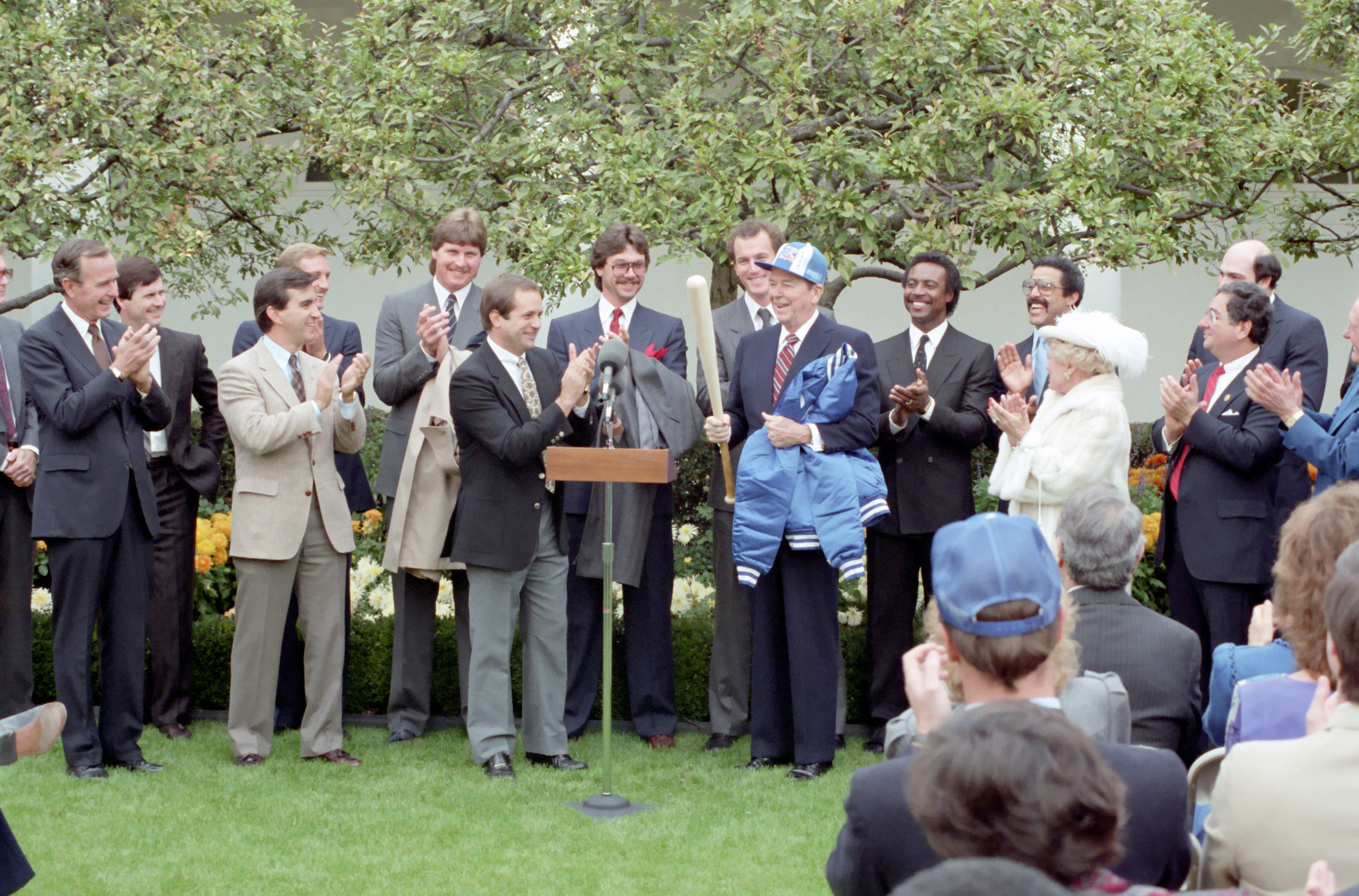
Manager Dick Howser (to left of podium) presents President Ronald Reagan with a Royals jacket, hat, and bat at the White House.

With the St. Louis Cardinals defeating the Los Angeles Dodgers in six games in the National League Championship Series, the 1985 World Series was destined to become one of the most memorable series for the cross-state rivals. It was popularly known as the Show-Me Series (Missouri is "the Show-Me State") and the I-70 Series. The 1985 World Series was played by National League rules, with no designated hitter, so the Royals were without the regular services of one of their best players, Hal McRae.

As they had done in the ALCS, the Royals lost three of their first four games with the Cardinals. The key game in the Royals' comeback was Game 6, a game famous for a tremendous Kansas City comeback, unfortunately belittled in St. Louis as due to supposed umpire errors. A call in the 4th inning cost the Royals their closest scoring opportunity when Frank White was called out after stealing second, and appearing on replay to have been safe, and the next batter, Pat Sheridan, got a hit. Facing elimination, the Royals trailed 1–0 in the bottom of the ninth inning before rallying to score two runs and win. In what has been called "one of the most controversial and famous plays in Series history", Jorge Orta led off the bottom of the ninth with a ground ball to Cardinal first baseman Jack Clark, who flipped the ball to pitcher Todd Worrell covering first. First base umpire Don Denkinger called Orta safe, but television replays showed that Worrell had beaten him to the base. Orta was later put out on the basepaths (the only out recorded in the inning), but Kansas City would go on to win as the Cardinals unravelled with a dropped pop up, a passed ball and poor pitching as the Royals capitalized on the opportunity. The Cardinals became completely undone in Game 7. The Royals' Bret Saberhagen pitched a five-hit shutout, allowing the Royals to win 11–0 and clinch the franchise's first World Series title as the Cardinals' pitchers fell apart. AL Kansas City Royals (4) vs NL St. Louis Cardinals (3)

Game	Score	Date	Location	Attendance
1	St. Louis Cardinals – 3, Kansas City Royals – 1	October 19	Royals Stadium	41,650
2	St. Louis Cardinals – 4, Kansas City Royals – 2	October 20	Royals Stadium	41,656
3	Kansas City Royals – 6, St. Louis Cardinals – 1	October 22	Busch Stadium II	53,634
4	Kansas City Royals – 0, St. Louis Cardinals – 3	October 23	Busch Stadium II	53,634
5	Kansas City Royals – 6, St. Louis Cardinals – 1	October 24	Busch Stadium II	53,634
6	St. Louis Cardinals – 1, Kansas City Royals – 2	October 26	Royals Stadium	41,628
7	St. Louis Cardinals – 0, Kansas City Royals – 11	October 27	Royals Stadium	41,658

=== Free agents ===
After the season these players became free agents:

- Dane Iorg, signed with the San Diego Padres
- Lynn Jones, re-signed
- Hal McRae, re-signed
- Jamie Quirk, re-signed

== Starting Lineups ==
=== Regular Season ===
==== Batting Order ====
1985 Regular Season Batting Order game log
April

#	Date	Opponent	1st	2nd	3rd	4th	5th	6th	7th	8th	9th
1	April 8	TOR	#6; Wilson (CF)	#15; Sheridan (RF)	#5; Brett (3B)	#3; Orta (DH)	#45; Balboni (1B)	#24; Motley (LF)	#20; White (2B)	#8; Sundberg (C)	#2; Concepción (SS)
2	April 10	TOR	#6; Wilson (CF)	#15; Sheridan (RF)	#5; Brett (3B)	#3; Orta (DH)	#45; Balboni (1B)	#24; Motley (LF)	#20; White (2B)	#8; Sundberg (C)	#2; Concepción (SS)
3	April 11	TOR	#6; Wilson (CF)	#15; Sheridan (RF)	#5; Brett (3B)	#3; Orta (DH)	#45; Balboni (1B)	#24; Motley (LF)	#20; White (2B)	#8; Sundberg (C)	#2; Concepción (SS)
4	April 13	DET	#6; Wilson (CF)	#15; Sheridan (RF)	#5; Brett (3B)	#3; Orta (DH)	#45; Balboni (1B)	#24; Motley (LF)	#20; White (2B)	#8; Sundberg (C)	#2; Concepción (SS)
5	April 14	DET	#6; Wilson (CF)	#15; Sheridan (RF)	#5; Brett (3B)	#3; Orta (DH)	#45; Balboni (1B)	#24; Motley (LF)	#20; White (2B)	#8; Sundberg (C)	#2; Concepción (SS)
6	April 16	BOS	#6; Wilson (CF)	#20; White (2B)	#5; Brett (3B)	#3; Orta (DH)	#24; Motley (LF)	#45; Balboni (1B)	#15; Sheridan (RF)	#8; Sundberg (C)	#1; Biancalana (SS)
7	April 17	BOS	#6; Wilson (CF)	#20; White (2B)	#5; Brett (3B)	#3; Orta (DH)	#24; Motley (LF)	#45; Balboni (1B)	#15; Sheridan (RF)	#8; Sundberg (C)	#1; Biancalana (SS)
8	April 18	BOS	#6; Wilson (CF)	#15; Sheridan (RF)	#5; Brett (3B)	#3; Orta (DH)	#9; Iorg (LF)	#45; Balboni (1B)	#20; White (2B)	#8; Sundberg (C)	#1; Biancalana (SS)
9	April 19	@ DET	#6; Wilson (CF)	#15; Sheridan (RF)	#5; Brett (3B)	#3; Orta (DH)	#24; Motley (LF)	#45; Balboni (1B)	#20; White (2B)	#8; Sundberg (C)	#1; Biancalana (SS)
10	April 20	@ DET	#6; Wilson (CF)	#15; Sheridan (RF)	#5; Brett (3B)	#3; Orta (DH)	#24; Motley (LF)	#45; Balboni (1B)	#20; White (2B)	#8; Sundberg (C)	#1; Biancalana (SS)
11	April 21	@ DET	#6; Wilson (CF)	#15; Sheridan (RF)	#5; Brett (3B)	#3; Orta (DH)	#24; Motley (LF)	#45; Balboni (1B)	#4; Pryor (2B)	#8; Sundberg (C)	#2; Concepción (SS)
12	April 22	@ TOR	#6; Wilson (CF)	#15; Sheridan (RF)	#5; Brett (3B)	#3; Orta (DH)	#24; Motley (LF)	#45; Balboni (1B)	#4; Pryor (2B)	#8; Sundberg (C)	#2; Concepción (SS)
13	April 23	@ TOR	#6; Wilson (CF)	#15; Sheridan (RF)	#5; Brett (3B)	#3; Orta (DH)	#24; Motley (LF)	#45; Balboni (1B)	#4; Pryor (2B)	#8; Sundberg (C)	#2; Concepción (SS)
14	April 24	@ TOR	#6; Wilson (CF)	#15; Sheridan (RF)	#5; Brett (3B)	#3; Orta (DH)	#24; Motley (LF)	#45; Balboni (1B)	#4; Pryor (2B)	#8; Sundberg (C)	#2; Concepción (SS)
15	April 26	@ BOS	#6; Wilson (CF)	#15; Sheridan (RF)	#5; Brett (3B)	#3; Orta (DH)	#45; Balboni (1B)	#24; Motley (LF)	#4; Pryor (2B)	#8; Sundberg (C)	#2; Concepción (SS)
16	April 27	@ BOS	#6; Wilson (CF)	#15; Sheridan (RF)	#5; Brett (3B)	#3; Orta (DH)	#45; Balboni (1B)	#24; Motley (LF)	#20; White (2B)	#8; Sundberg (C)	#2; Concepción (SS)
17	April 28	@ BOS	#6; Wilson (CF)	#15; Sheridan (RF)	#5; Brett (3B)	#3; Orta (DH)	#45; Balboni (1B)	#24; Motley (LF)	#20; White (2B)	#8; Sundberg (C)	#1; Biancalana (SS)
18	April 29	CLE									
19	April 30	CLE									

May

#	Date	Opponent	1st	2nd	3rd	4th	5th	6th	7th	8th	9th
20	May 1	CLE									
21	May 3	@ NYY	#6; Wilson (CF)	#35; L. Jones (RF)	#5; Brett (3B)	#11; McRae (DH)	#45; Balboni (1B)	#20; White (2B)	#24; Motley (LF)	#8; Sundberg (C)	#2; Concepción (SS)
22	May 4	@ NYY	#6; Wilson (CF)	#20; White (2B)	#5; Brett (3B)	#11; McRae (DH)	#45; Balboni (1B)	#24; Motley (LF)	#8; Sundberg (C)	#4; Pryor (SS)	#35; L. Jones (RF)
23	May 5	@ NYY	#6; Wilson (CF)	#15; Sheridan (RF)	#5; Brett (3B)	#3; Orta (DH)	#24; Motley (LF)	#45; Balboni (1B)	#20; White (2B)	#12; Wathan (C)	#1; Biancalana (SS)
24	May 7	BAL	#6; Wilson (CF)	#15; Sheridan (RF)	#5; Brett (3B)	#3; Orta (DH)	#45; Balboni (1B)	#24; Motley (LF)	#20; White (2B)	#8; Sundberg (C)	#2; Concepción (SS)
25	May 8	BAL	#6; Wilson (CF)	#20; White (2B)	#5; Brett (3B)	#11; McRae (DH)	#45; Balboni (1B)	#24; Motley (LF)	#8; Sundberg (C)	#35; L. Jones (RF)	#2; Concepción (SS)
26	May 10	NYY	#6; Wilson (CF)	#20; White (2B)	#5; Brett (3B)	#11; McRae (DH)	#45; Balboni (1B)	#24; Motley (LF)	#8; Sundberg (C)	#35; L. Jones (RF)	#2; Concepción (SS)
27	May 11	NYY	#6; Wilson (CF)	#20; White (2B)	#5; Brett (3B)	#11; McRae (DH)	#45; Balboni (1B)	#24; Motley (LF)	#35; L. Jones (RF)	#8; Sundberg (C)	#2; Concepción (SS)
28	May 12	NYY	#6; Wilson (CF)	#15; Sheridan (RF)	#5; Brett (3B)	#3; Orta (DH)	#45; Balboni (1B)	#9; Iorg (LF)	#20; White (2B)	#12; Wathan (C)	#2; Concepción (SS)
29	May 13	@ BAL	#6; Wilson (CF)	#15; Sheridan (RF)	#5; Brett (3B)	#3; Orta (DH)	#45; Balboni (1B)	#9; Iorg (LF)	#20; White (2B)	#8; Sundberg (C)	#2; Concepción (SS)
30	May 14	@ BAL	#6; Wilson (CF)	#20; White (2B)	#5; Brett (3B)	#11; McRae (DH)	#45; Balboni (1B)	#24; Motley (LF)	#35; L. Jones (RF)	#8; Sundberg (C)	#2; Concepción (SS)
31	May 15	@ CLE									
32	May 16	@ CLE									
33	May 17	@ MIL									
34	May 18	@ MIL									
35	May 19	@ MIL									
36	May 20	@ TEX									
37	May 21	@ TEX									
38	May 22	@ TEX									
39	May 24	CWS	#6; Wilson (CF)	#21; Smith (LF)	#5; Brett (3B)	#45; Balboni (1B)	#20; White (2B)	#24; Motley (RF)	#11; McRae (DH)	#8; Sundberg (C)	#2; Concepción (SS)
40	May 25	CWS	#6; Wilson (CF)	#21; Smith (LF)	#5; Brett (3B)	#3; Orta (DH)	#45; Balboni (1B)	#15; Sheridan (RF)	#20; White (2B)	#8; Sundberg (C)	#2; Concepción (SS)
41	May 26	CWS	#6; Wilson (CF)	#21; Smith (LF)	#5; Brett (3B)	#45; Balboni (1B)	#20; White (2B)	#24; Motley (RF)	#11; McRae (DH)	#12; Wathan (C)	#2; Concepción (SS)
42	May 27	TEX									
43	May 28	TEX									
44	May 29	TEX									
45	May 30	@ CWS	#6; Wilson (CF)	#21; Smith (LF)	#5; Brett (3B)	#3; Orta (DH)	#45; Balboni (1B)	#15; Sheridan (RF)	#20; White (2B)	#8; Sundberg (C)	#2; Concepción (SS)
46	May 31	@ CWS	#6; Wilson (CF)	#21; Smith (LF)	#5; Brett (3B)	#45; Balboni (1B)	#20; White (2B)	#24; Motley (RF)	#11; McRae (DH)	#8; Sundberg (C)	#2; Concepción (SS)

June

#	Date	Opponent	1st	2nd	3rd	4th	5th	6th	7th	8th	9th	
47	June 1	@ CWS	#6; Wilson (CF)	#21; Smith (LF)	#5; Brett (3B)	#45; Balboni (1B)	#20; White (2B)	#24; Motley (RF)	#11; McRae (DH)	#8; Sundberg (C)	#4; Pryor (SS)	
48	June 2	@ CWS	#6; Wilson (CF)	#21; Smith (LF)	#5; Brett (3B)	#3; Orta (DH)	#9; Iorg (1B)	#15; Sheridan (RF)	#20; White (2B)	#4; Pryor (SS)	#12; Wathan (C)	
49	June 4	MIL										
50	June 5	MIL										
51	June 7	@ CAL	#6; Wilson (CF)	#21; Smith (LF)	#5; Brett (3B)	#3; Orta (DH)	#45; Balboni (1B)	#15; Sheridan (RF)	#20; White (2B)	#8; Sundberg (C)	#2; Concepción (SS)	
52	June 8	@ CAL	#6; Wilson (CF)	#21; Smith (LF)	#3; Orta (DH)	#45; Balboni (1B)	#20; White (2B)	#15; Sheridan (RF)	#4; Pryor (3B)	#8; Sundberg (C)	#2; Concepción (SS)	
53	June 9	@ CAL	#21; Smith (LF)	#35; L. Jones (CF)	#3; Orta (DH)	#45; Balboni (1B)	#20; White (2B)	#15; Sheridan (RF)	#4; Pryor (3B)	#12; Wathan (C)	#2; Concepción (SS)	
54	June 10	@ OAK	#6; Wilson (CF)	#21; Smith (LF)	#20; White (2B)	#45; Balboni (1B)	#24; Motley (RF)	#11; McRae (DH)	#4; Pryor (3B)	#8; Sundberg (C)	#2; Concepción (SS)	
55	June 11	@ OAK	#6; Wilson (CF)	#21; Smith (LF)	#3; Orta (DH)	#45; Balboni (1B)	#20; White (2B)	#15; Sheridan (RF)	#4; Pryor (3B)	#8; Sundberg (C)	#2; Concepción (SS)	
56	June 12	@ OAK	#21; Smith (LF)	#35; L. Jones (CF)	#3; Orta (DH)	#45; Balboni (1B)	#20; White (2B)	#15; Sheridan (RF)	#4; Pryor (3B)	#12; Wathan (C)	#2; Concepción (SS)	
57	June 13	@ SEA										
58	June 14	@ SEA										
59	June 15	@ SEA										
60	June 16	@ SEA										
61	June 17	MIN	#6; Wilson (CF)	#21; Smith (LF)	#5; Brett (3B)	#24; Motley (RF)	#20; White (2B)	#11; McRae (DH)	#45; Balboni (1B)	#8; Sundberg (C)	#2; Concepción (SS)	
62	June 18	MIN	#6; Wilson (CF)	#21; Smith (LF)	#5; Brett (3B)	#24; Motley (RF)	#3; Orta (DH)	#20; White (2B)	#11; McRae (DH)	#45; Balboni (1B)	#8; Sundberg (C)	#2; Concepción {{small(SS)}}
63	June 19	MIN	#6; Wilson (CF)	#21; Smith (LF)	#5; Brett (3B)	#24; Motley (RF)	#20; White (2B)	#3; Orta (DH)	#45; Balboni (1B)	#8; Sundberg (C)	#1; Biancalana (SS)	
64	June 20	MI| #6 Wilson (CF)	#21; Smith (LF)	#5; Brett (3B)	#24; Motley (RF)	#20; White (2B)	#11; McRae (DH)	#45; Balboni (1B)	#8; Sundberg (C)	#1; Biancalana (SS)		
65	June 22	SEA										
66	June 23	SEA										
67	June 24	@ MIN	#6; Wilson (CF)	#21; Smith (LF)	#5; Brett (3B)	#24; Motley (RF)	#20; White (2B)	#11; McRae (DH)	#45; Balboni (1B)	#8; Sundberg (C)	#2; Concepción (SS)	
68	June 25	@ MIN	#6; Wilson (CF)	#21; Smith (LF)	#5; Brett (3B)	#3; Orta (DH)	#24; Motley (RF)	#45; Balboni (1B)	#8; Sundberg (C)	#4; Pryor (2B)	#2; Concepción (SS)	
69	June 26	@ MIN	#6; Wilson (CF)	#21; Smith (LF)	#5; Brett (3B)	#3; Orta (DH)	#20; White (2B)	#9; Iorg (RF)	#45; Balboni (1B)	#8; Sundberg (C)	#2; Concepción (SS)	
70	June 28	CAL	#6; Wilson (CF)	#21; Smith (LF)	#5; Brett (3B)	#3; Orta (DH)	#24; Motley (RF)	#20; White (2B)	#45; Balboni (1B)	#8; Sundberg (C)	#2; Concepción (SS)	
71	June 29	CAL	#6; Wilson (CF)	#21; Smith (LF)	#5; Brett (3B)	#3; Orta (DH)	#20; White (2B)	#8; Sundberg (C)	#45; Balboni (1B)	#36; Leeper (RF)	#2; Concepción (SS)	
72	June 30	CAL	#6; Wilson (CF)	#21; Smith (LF)	#5; Brett (3B)	#3; Orta (DH)	#45; Balboni (1B)	#20; White (2B)	#35; L. Jones (RF)	#12; Wathan (C)	#2; Concepción (SS)	

July

#	Date	Opponent	1st	2nd	3rd	4th	5th	6th	7th	8th	9th	
73	July 1	OAK	#6; Wilson (CF)	#21; Smith (LF)	#5; Brett (3B)	#3; Orta (DH)	#45; Balboni (1B)	#8; Sundberg (C)	#20; White (2B)	#35; L. Jones (RF)	#2; Concepción (SS)	
74	July 2	OAK	#6; Wilson (CF)	#21; Smith (LF)	#5; Brett (3B)	#3; Orta (DH)	#20; White (2B)	#8; Sundberg (C)	#45; Balboni (1B)	#36; Leeper (RF)	#1; Biancalana (SS)	
75	July 3	OAK	#6; Wilson (CF)	#21; Smith (LF)	#5; Brett (3B)	#3; Orta (DH)	#8; Sundberg (C)	#45; Balboni (1B)	#24; Motley (RF)	#4; Pryor (2B)	#1; Biancalana (SS)	
76	July 4	BAL	#6; Wilson (CF)	#21; Smith (LF)	#5; Brett (3B)	#3; Orta (DH)	#8; Sundberg (C)	#24; Motley (RF)	#45; Balboni (1B)	#20; White (2B)	#2; Concepción (SS)	
77	July 5	BAL	#6; Wilson (CF)	#21; Smith (LF)	#5; Brett (3B)	#3; Orta (DH)	#24; Motley (RF)	#45; Balboni (1B)	#20; White (2B)	#8; Sundberg (C)	#2; Concepción (SS)	
78	July 6	BAL	#6; Wilson (CF)	#21; Smith (LF)	#5; Brett (3B)	#11; McRae (DH)	#24; Motley (RF)	#45; Balboni (1B)	#20; White (2B)	#8; Sundberg (C)	#2; Concepción (SS)	
79	July 7	BAL	#6; Wilson (CF)	#21; Smith (LF)	#5; Brett (3B)	#3; Orta (DH)	#15; Sheridan (RF)	#9; Iorg (1B)	#20; White (2B)	#12; Wathan (C)	#2; Concepción (SS)	
80	July 8	@ NYY	#6; Wilson (CF)	#21; Smith (LF)	#5; Brett (3B)	#3; Orta (DH)	#15; Sheridan (RF)	#45; Balboni (1B)	#20; White (2B)	#8; Sundberg (C)	#2; Concepción (SS)	
81	July 9	@ NYY	#6; Wilson (CF)	#21; Smith (LF)	#5; Brett (3B)	#3; Orta (DH)	#24; Motley (RF)	#45; Balboni (1B)	#20; White (2B)	#8; Sundberg (C)	#2; Concepción (SS)	
82	July 10	@ NYY	#6; Wilson (CF)	#21; Smith (LF)	#5; Brett (3B)	#11; McRae (DH)	#45; Balboni (1B)	#20; White (2B)	#35; L. Jones (RF)	#12; Wathan (C)	#4; Pryor (SS)	
83	July 11	@ CLE										
84	July 12	@ CLE										
85	July 13	@ CLE										
86	July 14	@ CLE										
87	July 18	@ BAL	#6; Wilson (CF)	#21; Smith (LF)	#5; Brett (3B)	#20; White (2B)	#24; Motley (RF)	#11; McRae (DH)	#45; Balboni (1B)	#8; Sundberg (C)	#1; Biancalana (SS)	
88	July 19	@ BAL	#6; Wilson (CF)	#9; Iorg (LF)	#5; Brett (3B)	#3; Orta (DH)	#24; Motley (RF)	#20; White (2B)	#24; Motley (RF)	#45; Balboni (1B)	#8; Sundberg (C)	#2; Concepción (SS)
89	July 20	@ BAL	#6; Wilson (CF)	#21; Smith (LF)	#5; Brett (3B)	#20; White (2B)	#24; Motley (RF)	#11; McRae (DH)	#45; Balboni (1B)	#12; Wathan (C)	#1; Biancalana (SS)	
90	July 21	@ BAL	#6; Wilson (CF)	#9; Iorg (LF)	#5; Brett (3B)	#3; Orta (DH)	#20; White (2B)	#15; Sheridan (RF)	#45; Balboni (1B)	#8; Sundberg (C)	#1; Biancalana (SS)	
91	July 22	NYY	#6; Wilson (CF)	#21; Smith (LF)	#5; Brett (3B)	#20; White (2B)	#11; McRae (DH)	#45; Balboni (1B)	#24; Motley (RF)	#8; Sundberg (C)	#1; Biancalana (SS)	
92	July 23	NYY	#6; Wilson (CF)	#21; Smith (LF)	#5; Brett (3B)	#11; McRae (DH)	#9; Iorg (RF)	#20; White (2B)	#45; Balboni (1B)	#8; Sundberg (C)	#1; Biancalana (SS)	
93	July 24	NYY	#6; Wilson (CF)	#9; Iorg (LF)	#5; Brett (3B)	#11; McRae (DH)	#24; Motley (RF)	#20; White (2B)	#45; Balboni (1B)	#8; Sundberg (C)	#1; Biancalana (SS)	
94	July 26	CLE										
95	July 27	CLE										
96	July 28	CLE										
97	July 29	@ DET	#6; Wilson (CF)	#21; Smith (LF)	#5; Brett (3B)	#11; McRae (DH)	#9; Iorg (RF)	#20; White (2B)	#45; Balboni (1B)	#8; Sundberg (C)	#2; Concepción (SS)	
98	July 30	@ DET	#6; Wilson (CF)	#21; Smith (LF)	#5; Brett (3B)	#11; McRae (DH)	#9; Iorg (RF)	#20; White (2B)	#45; Balboni (1B)	#8; Sundberg (C)	#2; Concepción (SS)	
99	July 31	@ DET	#6; Wilson (CF)	#21; Smith (LF)	#5; Brett (3B)	#11; McRae (DH)	#20; White (2B)	#45; Balboni (1B)	#24; Motley (RF)	#12; Wathan (C)	#2; Concepción (SS)	

August

#	Date	Opponent	1st	2nd	3rd	4th	5th	6th	7th	8th	9th
100	August 2	BOS	#6; Wilson (CF)	#21; Smith (LF)	#5; Brett (3B)	#11; McRae (DH)	#20; White (2B)	#45; Balboni (1B)	#24; Motley (RF)	#8; Sundberg (C)	#2; Concepción (SS)
101	August 3	BOS	#6; Wilson (CF)	#21; Smith (LF)	#5; Brett (3B)	#11; McRae (DH)	#9; Iorg (RF)	#20; White (2B)	#45; Balboni (1B)	#12; Wathan (C)	#2; Concepción (SS)
102	August 4	BOS	#6; Wilson (CF)	#21; Smith (LF)	#5; Brett (3B)	#11; McRae (DH)	#20; White (2B)	#45; Balboni (1B)	#15; Sheridan (RF)	#8; Sundberg (C)	#2; Concepción (SS)
103	August 5	DET	#6; Wilson (CF)	#21; Smith (LF)	#5; Brett (3B)	#11; McRae (DH)	#9; Iorg (RF)	#20; White (2B)	#45; Balboni (1B)	#12; Wathan (C)	#2; Concepción (SS)
104	August 8	DET	#6; Wilson (CF)	#21; Smith (LF)	#5; Brett (3B)	#11; McRae (DH)	#20; White (2B)	#24; Motley (RF)	#45; Balboni (1B)	#8; Sundberg (C)	#2; Concepción (SS)
105	August 8	DET	#6; Wilson (CF)	#21; Smith (LF)	#5; Brett (3B)	#11; McRae (DH)	#9; Iorg (RF)	#20; White (2B)	#45; Balboni (1B)	#12; Wathan (C)	#2; Concepción (SS)
106	August 9	TOR	#6; Wilson (CF)	#21; Smith (LF)	#5; Brett (3B)	#11; McRae (DH)	#9; Iorg (RF)	#20; White (2B)	#45; Balboni (1B)	#8; Sundberg (C)	#2; Concepción (SS)
107	August 10	TOR	#6; Wilson (CF)	#21; Smith (LF)	#5; Brett (3B)	#20; White (2B)	#24; Motley (DH)	#45; Balboni (1B)	#35; Jones (RF)	#8; Sundberg (C)	#2; Concepción (SS)
108	August 11	TOR	#6; Wilson (CF)	#21; Smith (LF)	#5; Brett (3B)	#20; White (2B)	#3; Orta (DH)	#9; Iorg (RF)	#45; Balboni (1B)	#12; Wathan (C)	#2; Concepción (SS)
109	August 12	@ BOS	#6; Wilson (CF)	#21; Smith (LF)	#5; Brett (3B)	#20; White (2B)	#3; Orta (DH)	#9; Iorg (RF)	#45; Balboni (1B)	#8; Sundberg (C)	#2; Concepción (SS)
110	August 13	@ BOS	#21; Smith (LF)	#35; L. Jones (CF)	#5; Brett (3B)	#11; McRae (DH)	#20; White (2B)	#45; Balboni (1B)	#24; Motley (RF)	#8; Sundberg (C)	#2; Concepción (SS)
111	August 14	@ BOS	#21; Smith (LF)	#35; L. Jones (CF)	#5; Brett (3B)	#11; McRae (DH)	#20; White (2B)	#45; Balboni (1B)	#24; Motley (RF)	#8; Sundberg (C)	#2; Concepción (SS)
112	August 16	@ TOR	#21; Smith (LF)	#35; L. Jones (CF)	#5; Brett (3B)	#11; McRae (DH)	#20; White (2B)	#45; Balboni (1B)	#24; Motley (RF)	#8; Sundberg (C)	#2; Concepción (SS)
113	August 17	@ TOR	#6; Wilson (CF)	#21; Smith (LF)	#5; Brett (3B)	#11; McRae (DH)	#9; Iorg (RF)	#20; White (2B)	#45; Balboni (1B)	#12; Wathan (C)	#2; Concepción (SS)
114	August 18	@ TOR	#6; Wilson (CF)	#21; Smith (LF)	#5; Brett (3B)	#11; McRae (DH)	#9; Iorg (RF)	#45; Balboni (1B)	#4; Pryor (2B)	#12; Wathan (C)	#2; Concepción (SS)
115	August 19	DET	#6; Wilson (CF)	#21; Smith (LF)	#5; Brett (3B)	#11; McRae (DH)	#9; Iorg (RF)	#20; White (2B)	#45; Balboni (1B)	#12; Wathan (C)	#1; Biancalana (SS)
116	August 20	@ CWS	#6; Wilson (CF)	#21; Smith (LF)	#5; Brett (3B)	#11; McRae (DH)	#9; Iorg (RF)	#20; White (2B)	#45; Balboni (1B)	#12; Wathan (C)	#1; Biancalana (SS)
117	August 21	@ CWS	#21; Smith (LF)	#35; L. Jones (CF)	#5; Brett (3B)	#11; McRae (DH)	#20; White (2B)	#45; Balboni (1B)	#24; Motley (RF)	#12; Wathan (C)	#1; Biancalana (SS)
118	August 22	@ CWS	#6; Wilson (CF)	#21; Smith (LF)	#5; Brett (3B)	#11; McRae (DH)	#9; Iorg (RF)	#20; White (2B)	#45; Balboni (1B)	#12; Wathan (C)	#1; Biancalana (SS)
119	August 23	TEX									
120	August 24	TEX									
121	August 25	TEX									
122	August 26	TEX									
123	August 27	@ MIL									
124	August 28	@ MIL									
125	August 30	@ TEX									
126	August 31	@ TEX									

September

#	Date	Opponent	1st	2nd	3rd	4th	5th	6th	7th	8th	9th
127	September 1	@ TEX									
128	September 2	CWS	#21; Smith (LF)	#35; L. Jones (CF)	#5; Brett (3B)	#11; McRae (DH)	#45; Balboni (1B)	#24; Motley (RF)	#4; Pryor (2B)	#18; Quirk (C)	#2; Concepción (SS)
129	September 3	CWS	#35; L. Jones (CF)	#15; Sheridan (RF)	#5; Brett (3B)	#11; McRae (DH)	#45; Balboni (1B)	#24; Motley (LF)	#18; Quirk (C)	#4; Pryor (2B)	#2; Concepción (SS)
130	September 4	CWS	#2; Concepción (SS)	#35; L. Jones (CF)	#5; Brett (3B)	#11; McRae (DH)	#24; Motley (LF)	#45; Balboni (1B)	#4; Pryor (2B)	#12; Wathan (C)	#15; Sheridan (RF)
131	September 5	MIL									
132	September 6	MIL									
133	September 6	MIL									
134	September 7	MIL									
135	September 8	MIL									
136	September 9	@ CAL	#21; Smith (LF)	#35; L. Jones (CF)	#5; Brett (3B)	#11; McRae (DH)	#20; White (2B)	#45; Balboni (1B)	#24; Motley (RF)	#12; Wathan (C)	#2; Concepción (SS)
137	September 10	@ CAL	#28; Moreno; CF)	#21; Smith (LF)	#5; Brett (3B)	#11; McRae (DH)	#20; White (2B)	#45; Balboni (1B)	#24; Motley (RF)	#12; Wathan (C)	#2; Concepción (SS)
138	September 11	@ CAL	#28; Moreno; CF)	#21; Smith (LF)	#5; Brett (3B)	#11; McRae (DH)	#20; White (2B)	#45; Balboni (1B)	#24; Motley (RF)	#18; Quirk (C)	#2; Concepción (SS)
139	September 13	@ OAK	#28; Moreno; CF)	#21; Smith (LF)	#5; Brett (3B)	#11; McRae (DH)	#20; White (2B)	#45; Balboni (1B)	#24; Motley (RF)	#18; Quirk (C)	#2; Concepción (SS)
140	September 14	@ OAK	#21; Smith (LF)	#35; L. Jones (CF)	#5; Brett (3B)	#11; McRae (DH)	#20; White (2B)	#45; Balboni (1B)	#24; Motley (RF)	#8; Sundberg (C)	#2; Concepción (SS)
141	September 15	@ OAK	#28; Moreno; CF)	#21; Smith (LF)	#5; Brett (3B)	#11; McRae (DH)	#20; White (2B)	#45; Balboni (1B)	#24; Motley (RF)	#18; Quirk (C)	#1; Biancalana (SS)
142	September 15	@ OAK	#21; Smith (LF)	#35; L. Jones (CF)	#5; Brett (3B)	#11; McRae (DH)	#20; White (2B)	#45; Balboni (1B)	#24; Motley (RF)	#8; Sundberg (C)	#2; Concepción (SS)
143	September 16	SEA									
144	September 17	SEA									
145	September 18	SEA									
146	September 19	SEA									
147	September 20	MIN	#21; Smith (LF)	#6; Wilson (CF)	#5; Brett (3B)	#3; Orta (DH)	#45; Balboni (1B)	#20; White (2B)	#28; Moreno; CF)	#18; Quirk (C)	#1; Biancalana (SS)
148	September 21	MIN	#21; Smith (LF)	#6; Wilson (CF)	#5; Brett (3B)	#3; Orta (DH)	#45; Balboni (1B)	#20; White (2B)	#28; Moreno; CF)	#18; Quirk (C)	#1; Biancalana (SS)
149	September 22	MIN	#21; Smith (LF)	#6; Wilson (CF)	#5; Brett (3B)	#11; McRae (DH)	#20; White (2B)	#45; Balboni (1B)	#24; Motley (RF)	#8; Sundberg (C)	#1; Biancalana (SS)
150	September 24	@ SEA									
151	September 25	@ SEA									
152	September 26	@ SEA									
153	September 27	@ MIN	#21; Smith (LF)	#6; Wilson (CF)	#5; Brett (3B)	#20; White (2B)	#45; Balboni (1B)	#24; Motley (DH)	#8; Sundberg (C)	#35; L. Jones (RF)	#2; Concepción (SS)
154	September 28	@ MIN	#21; Smith (LF)	#6; Wilson (CF)	#5; Brett (3B)	#3; Orta (DH)	#20; White (2B)	#45; Balboni (1B)	#24; Motley (RF)	#18; Quirk (C)	#1; Biancalana (SS)
155	September 29	@ MIN	#21; Smith (LF)	#6; Wilson (CF)	#5; Brett (3B)	#3; Orta (DH)	#20; White (2B)	#45; Balboni (1B)	#28; Moreno; CF)	#18; Quirk (C)	#1; Biancalana (SS)
156	September 30	CAL	#21; Smith (LF)	#6; Wilson (CF)	#5; Brett (3B)	#11; McRae (DH)	#20; White (2B)	#45; Balboni (1B)	#24; Motley (RF)	#8; Sundberg (C)	#2; Concepción (SS)

October

#	Date	Opponent	1st	2nd	3rd	4th	5th	6th	7th	8th	9th
157	October 1	CAL	#21; Smith (LF)	#6; Wilson (CF)	#5; Brett (3B)	#3; Orta (DH)	#20; White (2B)	#45; Balboni (1B)	#28; Moreno; RF)	#8; Sundberg (C)	#1; Biancalana (SS)
158	October 2	CAL	#21; Smith (LF)	#6; Wilson (CF)	#5; Brett (3B)	#3; Orta (DH)	#20; White (2B)	#45; Balboni (1B)	#15; Sheridan (RF)	#8; Sundberg (C)	#1; Biancalana (SS)
159	October 3	CAL	#21; Smith (LF)	#6; Wilson (CF)	#5; Brett (DH)	#20; White (2B)	#45; Balboni (1B)	#15; Sheridan (RF)	#8; Sundberg (C)	#4; Pryor (3B)	#1; Biancalana (SS)
160	October 4	OAK	#21; Smith (LF)	#6; Wilson (CF)	#5; Brett (3B)	#3; Orta (DH)	#20; White (2B)	#45; Balboni (1B)	#15; Sheridan (RF)	#8; Sundberg (C)	#1; Biancalana (SS)
161	October 5	OAK	#21; Smith (LF)	#6; Wilson (CF)	#5; Brett (3B)	#20; White (2B)	#45; Balboni (1B)	#24; Motley (DH)	#8; Sundberg (C)	#35; L. Jones (RF)	#1; Biancalana (SS)
162	October 6	OAK	#36; Leeper (LF)	#28; Moreno; RF)	#24; Motley (DH)	#9; Iorg (3B)	#18; Quirk (C)	#12; Wathan (1B)	#4; Pryor (2B)	#35; L. Jones (CF)	#16; Scranton (SS)

==== Defensive Lineup ====
1985 Regular Season Defensive Lineup game log
April

#	Date	Opponent	C	1B	2B	3B	SS	LF	CF	RF	P
1	April 8	TOR	#8; Sundberg	#45; Balboni	#20; White	#5; Brett	#2; Concepción	#24; Motley	#6; Wilson	#15; Sheridan	#40; Black
2	April 10	TOR	#8; Sundberg	#45; Balboni	#20; White	#5; Brett	#2; Concepción	#24; Motley	#6; Wilson	#15; Sheridan	#25; Jackson
3	April 11	TOR	#8; Sundberg	#45; Balboni	#20; White	#5; Brett	#2; Concepción	#24; Motley	#6; Wilson	#15; Sheridan	#37; Leibrandt
4	April 13	DET	#8; Sundberg	#45; Balboni	#20; White	#5; Brett	#2; Concepción	#24; Motley	#6; Wilson	#15; Sheridan	#40; Black
5	April 14	DET	#8; Sundberg	#45; Balboni	#20; White	#5; Brett	#2; Concepción	#24; Motley	#6; Wilson	#15; Sheridan	#31; Saberhagen
6	April 16	BOS	#8; Sundberg	#45; Balboni	#20; White	#5; Brett	#1; Biancalana	#24; Motley	#6; Wilson	#15; Sheridan	#25; Jackson
7	April 17	BOS	#8; Sundberg	#45; Balboni	#20; White	#5; Brett	#1; Biancalana	#24; Motley	#6; Wilson	#15; Sheridan	#37; Leibrandt
8	April 18	BOS	#8; Sundberg	#45; Balboni	#20; White	#5; Brett	#1; Biancalana	#9; Iorg	#6; Wilson	#15; Sheridan	
9	April 19	@ DET	#8; Sundberg	#45; Balboni	#20; White	#5; Brett	#1; Biancalana	#24; Motley	#6; Wilson	#15; Sheridan	#31; Saberhagen
10	April 20	@ DET	#8; Sundberg	#45; Balboni	#20; White	#5; Brett	#1; Biancalana	#24; Motley	#6; Wilson	#15; Sheridan	#23; Gubicza
11	April 21	@ DET	#8; Sundberg	#45; Balboni	#4; Pryor	#5; Brett	#2; Concepción	#24; Motley	#6; Wilson	#15; Sheridan	#25; Jackson
12	April 22	@ TOR	#8; Sundberg	#45; Balboni	#4; Pryor	#5; Brett	#2; Concepción	#24; Motley	#6; Wilson	#15; Sheridan	#37; Leibrandt
13	April 23	@ TOR	#8; Sundberg	#45; Balboni	#4; Pryor	#5; Brett	#2; Concepción	#24; Motley	#6; Wilson	#15; Sheridan	#40; Black
14	April 24	@ TOR	#8; Sundberg	#45; Balboni	#4; Pryor	#5; Brett	#2; Concepción	#24; Motley	#6; Wilson	#15; Sheridan	#31; Saberhagen
15	April 26	@ BOS	#8; Sundberg	#45; Balboni	#4; Pryor	#5; Brett	#2; Concepción	#24; Motley	#6; Wilson	#15; Sheridan	#23; Gubicza
16	April 27	@ BOS	#8; Sundberg	#45; Balboni	#20; White	#5; Brett	#2; Concepción	#24; Motley	#6; Wilson	#15; Sheridan	#25; Jackson
17	April 28	@ BOS	#8; Sundberg	#45; Balboni	#20; White	#5; Brett	#1; Biancalana	#24; Motley	#6; Wilson	#15; Sheridan	#37; Leibrandt
18	April 29	CLE									
19	April 30	CLE									

May

#	Date	Opponent	C	1B	2B	3B	SS	LF	CF	RF	P
20	May 1	CLE									
21	May 3	@ NYY	#8; Sundberg	#45; Balboni	#20; White	#5; Brett	#2; Concepción	#24; Motley	#6; Wilson	#35; L. Jones	#25; Jackson
22	May 4	@ NYY	#8; Sundberg	#45; Balboni	#20; White	#5; Brett	#4; Pryor	#24; Motley	#6; Wilson	#35; L. Jones	#37; Leibrandt
23	May 5	@ NYY	#12; Wathan	#45; Balboni	#20; White	#5; Brett	#1; Biancalana	#24; Motley	#6; Wilson	#15; Sheridan	#40; Black
24	May 7	BAL	#8; Sundberg	#45; Balboni	#20; White	#5; Brett	#2; Concepción	#24; Motley	#6; Wilson	#15; Sheridan	#31; Saberhagen
25	May 8	BAL	#8; Sundberg	#45; Balboni	#20; White	#5; Brett	#2; Concepción	#24; Motley	#6; Wilson	#35; L. Jones	#25; Jackson
26	May 10	NYY	#8; Sundberg	#45; Balboni	#20; White	#5; Brett	#2; Concepción	#24; Motley	#6; Wilson	#35; L. Jones	#37; Leibrandt
27	May 11	NYY	#8; Sundberg	#45; Balboni	#20; White	#5; Brett	#2; Concepción	#24; Motley	#6; Wilson	#35; L. Jones	#40; Black
28	May 12	NYY	#12; Wathan	#45; Balboni	#20; White	#5; Brett	#2; Concepción	#9; Iorg	#6; Wilson	#15; Sheridan	#31; Saberhagen
29	May 13	@ BAL	#8; Sundberg	#45; Balboni	#20; White	#5; Brett	#2; Concepción	#9; Iorg	#6; Wilson	#15; Sheridan	#25; Jackson
30	May 14	@ BAL	#8; Sundberg	#45; Balboni	#20; White	#5; Brett	#2; Concepción	#24; Motley	#6; Wilson	#35; L. Jones	#23; Gubicza
31	May 15	@ CLE									
32	May 16	@ CLE									
33	May 17	@ MIL									
34	May 18	@ MIL									
35	May 19	@ MIL									
36	May 20	@ TEX									
37	May 21	@ TEX									
38	May 22	@ TEX									
39	May 24	CWS	#8; Sundberg	#45; Balboni	#20; White	#5; Brett	#2; Concepción	#21; Smith	#6; Wilson	#24; Motley	#25; Jackson
40	May 25	CWS	#8; Sundberg	#45; Balboni	#20; White	#5; Brett	#2; Concepción	#21; Smith	#6; Wilson	#15; Sheridan	#37; Leibrandt
41	May 26	CWS	#12; Wathan	#45; Balboni	#20; White	#5; Brett	#2; Concepción	#21; Smith	#6; Wilson	#24; Motley	#40; Black
42	May 27	TEX									
43	May 28	TEX									
44	May 29	TEX									
45	May 30	@ CWS	#8; Sundberg	#45; Balboni	#20; White	#5; Brett	#2; Concepción	#21; Smith	#6; Wilson	#15; Sheridan	#37; Leibrandt
46	May 31	@ CWS	#8; Sundberg	#45; Balboni	#20; White	#5; Brett	#2; Concepción	#21; Smith	#6; Wilson	#24; Motley	#40; Black

June

#	Date	Opponent	C	1B	2B	3B	SS	LF	CF	RF	P
47	June 1	@ CWS	#8; Sundberg	#45; Balboni	#20; White	#5; Brett	#4; Pryor	#21; Smith	#6; Wilson	#24; Motley	#31; Saberhagen
48	June 2	@ CWS	#12; Wathan	#9; Iorg	#20; White	#5; Brett	#4; Pryor	#21; Smith	#6; Wilson	#15; Sheridan	#23; Gubicza
49	June 4	MIL									
50	June 5	MIL									
51	June 7	@ CAL	#8; Sundberg	#45; Balboni	#20; White	#5; Brett	#2; Concepción	#21; Smith	#6; Wilson	#15; Sheridan	#31; Saberhagen
52	June 8	@ CAL	#8; Sundberg	#45; Balboni	#20; White	#4; Pryor	#2; Concepción	#21; Smith	#6; Wilson	#15; Sheridan	#23; Gubicza
53	June 9	@ CAL	#12; Wathan	#45; Balboni	#20; White	#4; Pryor	#2; Concepción	#21; Smith	#35; L. Jones	#15; Sheridan	#25; Jackson
54	June 10	@ OAK	#8; Sundberg	#45; Balboni	#20; White	#4; Pryor	#2; Concepción	#21; Smith	#6; Wilson	#24; Motley	#37; Leibrandt
55	June 11	@ OAK	#8; Sundberg	#45; Balboni	#20; White	#4; Pryor	#2; Concepción	#21; Smith	#6; Wilson	#15; Sheridan	#40; Bud Black
56	June 12	@ OAK	#12; Wathan	#45; Balboni	#20; White	#4; Pryor	#2; Concepción	#21; Smith	#35; L. Jones	#15; Sheridan	#31; Saberhagen
57	June 13	@ SEA									
58	June 14	@ SEA									
59	June 15	@ SEA									
60	June 16	@ SEA									
61	June 17	MIN	#8; Sundberg	#45; Balboni	#20; White	#5; Brett	#2; Concepción	#21; Smith	#6; Wilson	#24; Motley	#31; Saberhagen
62	June 18	MIN	#8; Sundberg	#45; Balboni	#20; White	#5; Brett	#2; Concepción	#21; Smith	#6; Wilson	#24; Motley	#23; Gubicza
63	June 19	MIN	#8; Sundberg	#45; Balboni	#20; White	#5; Brett	#1; Biancalana	#21; Smith	#6; Wilson	#24; Motley	#25; Jackson
64	June 20	MIN	#8; Sundberg	#45; Balboni	#20; White	#5; Brett	#1; Biancalana	#21; Smith	#6; Wilson	#24; Motley	#37; Leibrandt
65	June 22	SEA									
66	June 23	SEA									
67	June 24	@ MIN	#8; Sundberg	#45; Balboni	#20; White	#5; Brett	#2; Concepción	#21; Smith	#6; Wilson	#24; Motley	#23; Gubicza
68	June 25	@ MIN	#8; Sundberg	#45; Balboni	#4; Pryor	#5; Brett	#2; Concepción	#21; Smith	#6; Wilson	#24; Motley	#25; Jackson
69	June 26	@ MIN	#8; Sundberg	#45; Balboni	#4; Pryor	#5; Brett	#2; Concepción	#21; Smith	#6; Wilson	#9; Iorg	#37; Leibrandt
70	June 28	CAL	#8; Sundberg	#45; Balboni	#20; White	#5; Brett	#2; Concepción	#21; Smith	#6; Wilson	#24; Motley	#31; Saberhagen
71	June 29	CAL	#8; Sundberg	#45; Balboni	#20; White	#5; Brett	#2; Concepción	#21; Smith	#6; Wilson	#36; Leeper	#40; Black
72	June 30	CAL	#12; Wathan	#45; Balboni	#20; White	#5; Brett	#2; Concepción	#21; Smith	#6; Wilson	#35; L. Jones	#23; Gubicza

July

#	Date	Opponent	C	1B	2B	3B	SS	LF	CF	RF	P
73	July 1	OAK	#8; Sundberg	#45; Balboni	#20; White	#5; Brett	#2; Concepción	#21; Smith	#6; Wilson	#35; L. Jones	#25; Jackson
74	July 2	OAK	#8; Sundberg	#45; Balboni	#20; White	#5; Brett	#1; Biancalana	#21; Smith	#6; Wilson	#36; Leeper	#37; Leibrandt
75	July 3	OAK	#8; Sundberg	#45; Balboni	#4; Pryor	#5; Brett	#1; Biancalana	#21; Smith	#6; Wilson	#24; Motley	#31; Saberhagen
76	July 4	BAL	#8; Sundberg	#45; Balboni	#20; White	#5; Brett	#2; Concepción	#21; Smith	#6; Wilson	#24; Motley	#40; Black
77	July 5	BAL	#8; Sundberg	#45; Balboni	#20; White	#5; Brett	#2; Concepción	#21; Smith	#6; Wilson	#24; Motley	#23; Gubicza
78	July 6	BAL	#8; Sundberg	#45; Balboni	#20; White	#5; Brett	#2; Concepción	#21; Smith	#6; Wilson	#24; Motley	#25; Jackson
79	July 7	BAL	#12; Wathan	#9; Iorg	#20; White	#5; Brett	#2; Concepción	#21; Smith	#6; Wilson	#15; Sheridan	#37; Leibrandt
80	July 8	@ NYY	#8; Sundberg	#45; Balboni	#20; White	#5; Brett	#2; Concepción	#21; Smith	#6; Wilson	#15; Sheridan	#31; Saberhagen
81	July 9	@ NYY	#8; Sundberg	#45; Balboni	#20; White	#5; Brett	#2; Concepción	#21; Smith	#6; Wilson	#24; Motley	#40; Black
82	July 10	@ NYY	#12; Wathan	#45; Balboni	#20; White	#5; Brett	#4; Pryor	#21; Smith	#6; Wilson	#35; L. Jones	#23; Gubicza
83	July 11	@ CLE									
84	July 12	@ CLE									
85	July 13	@ CLE									
86	July 14	@ CLE									
87	July 18	@ BAL	#8; Sundberg	#45; Balboni	#20; White	#5; Brett	#1; Biancalana	#21; Smith	#6; Wilson	#24; Motley	#31; Saberhagen
88	July 19	@ BAL	#8; Sundberg	#45; Balboni	#20; White	#5; Brett	#2; Concepción	#9; Iorg	#6; Wilson	#24; Motley	#37; Leibrandt
89	July 20	@ BAL	#12; Wathan	#45; Balboni	#20; White	#5; Brett	#1; Biancalana	#21; Smith	#6; Wilson	#24; Motley	#25; Jackson
90	July 21	@ BAL	#8; Sundberg	#45; Balboni	#20; White	#5; Brett	#1; Biancalana	#9; Iorg	#6; Wilson	#15; Sheridan	#40; Black
91	July 22	NYY	#8; Sundberg	#45; Balboni	#20; White	#5; Brett	#1; Biancalana	#21; Smith	#6; Wilson	#24; Motley	#23; Gubicza
92	July 23	NYY	#8; Sundberg	#45; Balboni	#20; White	#5; Brett	#1; Biancalana	#21; Smith	#6; Wilson	#9; Iorg	#31; Saberhagen
93	July 24	NYY	#8; Sundberg	#45; Balboni	#20; White	#5; Brett	#1; Biancalana	#9; Iorg	#6; Wilson	#24; Motley	#37; Leibrandt
94	July 26	CLE									
95	July 27	CLE									
96	July 28	CLE									
97	July 29	@ DET	#8; Sundberg	#45; Balboni	#20; White	#5; Brett	#2; Concepción	#21; Smith	#6; Wilson	#9; Iorg	#31; Saberhagen
98	July 30	@ DET	#8; Sundberg	#45; Balboni	#20; White	#5; Brett	#2; Concepción	#21; Smith	#6; Wilson	#9; Iorg	#37; Leibrandt
99	July 31	@ DET	#12; Wathan	#45; Balboni	#20; White	#5; Brett	#2; Concepción	#21; Smith	#6; Wilson	#24; Motley	#25; Jackson

August

#	Date	Opponent	C	1B	2B	3B	SS	LF	CF	RF	P
100	August 2	BOS	#8; Sundberg	#45; Balboni	#20; White	#5; Brett	#2; Concepción	#21; Smith	#6; Wilson	#24; Motley	#40; Black
101	August 3	BOS	#12; Wathan	#45; Balboni	#20; White	#5; Brett	#2; Concepción	#21; Smith	#6; Wilson	#9; Iorg	#23; Gubicza
102	August 4	BOS	#12; Wathan	#45; Balboni	#20; White	#5; Brett	#2; Concepción	#21; Smith	#6; Wilson	#15; Sheridan	#37; Leibrandt
103	August 5	DET	#12; Wathan	#45; Balboni	#20; White	#5; Brett	#2; Concepción	#21; Smith	#6; Wilson	#9; Iorg	#25; Jackson
104	August 8	DET	#8; Sundberg	#45; Balboni	#20; White	#5; Brett	#2; Concepción	#21; Smith	#6; Wilson	#24; Motley	#31; Saberhagen
105	August 8	DET	#12; Wathan	#45; Balboni	#20; White	#5; Brett	#2; Concepción	#21; Smith	#6; Wilson	#9; Iorg	#26; Farr
106	August 9	TOR	#8; Sundberg	#45; Balboni	#20; White	#5; Brett	#2; Concepción	#21; Smith	#6; Wilson	#9; Iorg	#40; Black
107	August 10	TOR	#8; Sundberg	#45; Balboni	#20; White	#5; Brett	#2; Concepción	#21; Smith	#6; Wilson	#35; L. Jones	#37; Leibrandt
108	August 11	TOR	#12; Wathan	#45; Balboni	#20; White	#5; Brett	#2; Concepción	#21; Smith	#6; Wilson	#9; Iorg	#25; Jackson
109	August 12	@ BOS	#8; Sundberg	#45; Balboni	#20; White	#5; Brett	#2; Concepción	#21; Smith	#6; Wilson	#9; Iorg	#23; Gubicza
110	August 13	@ BOS	#8; Sundberg	#45; Balboni	#20; White	#5; Brett	#2; Concepción	#21; Smith	#6; Wilson	#24; Motley	#31; Saberhagen
111	August 14	@ BOS	#8; Sundberg	#45; Balboni	#20; White	#5; Brett	#2; Concepción	#21; Smith	#6; Wilson	#24; Motley	#40; Black
112	August 16	@ TOR	#8; Sundberg	#45; Balboni	#20; White	#5; Brett	#2; Concepción	#21; Smith	#35; L. Jones	#24; Motley	#37; Leibrandt
113	August 17	@ TOR	#12; Wathan	#45; Balboni	#20; White	#5; Brett	#2; Concepción	#21; Smith	#6; Wilson	#9; Iorg	#25; Jackson
114	August 18	@ TOR	#12; Wathan	#45; Balboni	#4; Pryor	#5; Brett	#2; Concepción	#21; Smith	#6; Wilson	#9; Iorg	#23; Gubicza
115	August 19	DET	#12; Wathan	#45; Balboni	#4; Pryor	#5; Brett	#1; Biancalana	#21; Smith	#6; Wilson	#9; Iorg	#31; Saberhagen
116	August 20	@ CWS	#12; Wathan	#45; Balboni	#4; Pryor	#5; Brett	#1; Biancalana	#21; Smith	#6; Wilson	#9; Iorg	#40; Black
117	August 21	@ CWS	#12; Wathan	#45; Balboni	#4; Pryor	#5; Brett	#1; Biancalana	#21; Smith	#35; L. Jones	#24; Motley	#37; Leibrandt
118	August 22	@ CWS	#12; Wathan	#45; Balboni	#4; Pryor	#5; Brett	#1; Biancalana	#21; Smith	#6; Wilson	#9; Iorg	#25; Jackson
119	August 23	TEX									
120	August 24	TEX									
121	August 25	TEX									
122	August 26	TEX									
123	August 27	@ MIL									
124	August 28	@ MIL									
125	August 30	@ TEX									
126	August 31	@ TEX									

September

#	Date	Opponent	C	1B	2B	3B	SS	LF	CF	RF	P	
127	September 1	@ TEX										
128	September 2	CWS	#18; Quirk	#45; Balboni	#4; Pryor	#5; Brett	#2; Concepción	#21; Smith	#35; L. Jones	#24; Motley	#23; Gubicza	
129	September 3	CWS	#18; Quirk	#45; Balboni	#4; Pryor	#5; Brett	#2; Concepción	#21; Smith	#24; Motley	#35; L. Jones	#15; Sheridan	#31; Saberhagen
130	September 4	CWS	#12; Wathan	#45; Balboni	#4; Pryor	#5; Brett	#2; Concepción	#24; Motley	#15; Sheridan	#40; Black		
131	September 5	MIL										
132	September 6	MIL										
133	September 6	MIL										
134	September 7	MIL										
135	September 8	MIL										
136	September 9	@ CAL	#12; Wathan	#45; Balboni	#20; White	#5; Brett	#2; Concepción	#21; Smith	#35; L. Jones	#24; Motley	#31; Saberhagen	
137	September 10	@ CAL	#12; Wathan	#45; Balboni	#20; White	#5; Brett	#2; Concepción	#21; Smith	#28; Moreno	#24; Motley	#37; Leibrandt	
138	September 11	@ CAL	#18; Quirk	#45; Balboni	#20; White	#5; Brett	#2; Concepción	#21; Smith	#28; Moreno	#24; Motley	#25; Jackson	
139	September 13	@ OAK	#18; Quirk	#45; Balboni	#20; White	#5; Brett	#2; Concepción	#21; Smith	#28; Moreno	#24; Motley	#23; Gubicza	
140	September 14	@ OAK	#8; Sundberg	#45; Balboni	#20; White	#5; Brett	#2; Concepción	#21; Smith	#35; L. Jones	#24; Motley	#31; Saberhagen	
141	September 15	@ OAK	#18; Quirk	#45; Balboni	#20; White	#5; Brett	#1; Biancalana	#21; Smith	#28; Moreno	#24; Motley	#37; Leibrandt	
142	September 15	@ OAK	#8; Sundberg	#45; Balboni	#20; White	#5; Brett	#2; Concepción	#21; Smith	#35; L. Jones	#24; Motley	#40; Black	
143	September 16	SEA										
144	September 17	SEA										
145	September 18	SEA										
146	September 19	SEA										
147	September 20	MIN	#18; Quirk	#45; Balboni	#20; White	#5; Brett	#1; Biancalana	#21; Smith	#6; Wilson	#28; Moreno	#37; Leibrandt	
148	September 21	MIN	#18; Quirk	#45; Balboni	#20; White	#5; Brett	#1; Biancalana	#21; Smith	#6; Wilson	#28; Moreno	#40; Black	
149	September 22	MIN	#8; Sundberg	#45; Balboni	#20; White	#5; Brett	#1; Biancalana	#21; Smith	#6; Wilson	#24; Motley	#25; Jackson	
150	September 24	@ SEA										
151	September 25	@ SEA										
152	September 26	@ SEA										
153	September 27	@ MIN	#8; Sundberg	#45; Balboni	#20; White	#5; Brett	#2; Concepción	#21; Smith	#6; Wilson	#35; L. Jones	#40; Black	
154	September 28	@ MIN	#18; Quirk	#45; Balboni	#20; White	#5; Brett	#1; Biancalana	#21; Smith	#6; Wilson	#24; Motley	#25; Jackson	
155	September 29	@ MIN	#18; Quirk	#45; Balboni	#20; White	#5; Brett	#1; Biancalana	#21; Smith	#6; Wilson	#28; Moreno	#23; Gubicza	
156	September 30	CAL	#8; Sundberg	#45; Balboni	#20; White	#5; Brett	#2; Concepción	#21; Smith	#6; Wilson	#24; Motley	#31; Saberhagen	

October

#	Date	Opponent	C	1B	2B	3B	SS	LF	CF	RF	P
157	October 1	CAL	#8; Sundberg	#45; Balboni	#20; White	#5; Brett	#1; Biancalana	#21; Smith	#6; Wilson	#28; Moreno	#37; Leibrandt
158	October 2	CAL	#8; Sundberg	#45; Balboni	#20; White	#5; Brett	#1; Biancalana	#21; Smith	#6; Wilson	#15; Sheridan	#40; Black
159	October 3	CAL	#8; Sundberg	#45; Balboni	#20; White	#4; Pryor	#1; Biancalana	#21; Smith	#6; Wilson	#15; Sheridan	#25; Jackson
160	October 4	OAK	#8; Sundberg	#45; Balboni	#20; White	#5; Brett	#1; Biancalana	#21; Smith	#6; Wilson	#15; Sheridan	#23; Gubicza
161	October 5	OAK	#8; Sundberg	#45; Balboni	#20; White	#5; Brett	#1; Biancalana	#21; Smith	#6; Wilson	#35; L. Jones	#31; Saberhagen
162	October 6	OAK	#18; Quirk	#12; Wathan	#4; Pryor	#9; Iorg	#16; Scranton	#36; Leeper	#35; L. Jones	#28; Moreno	#17; M. Jones

=== Postseason ===
==== Batting Order ====
1985 Postseason Batting Order game log
AL Championship Series: vs. Toronto Blue Jays

#	Date	Opponent	1st	2nd	3rd	4th	5th	6th	7th	8th	9th
1	October 8	@ TOR	#21; Smith (LF)	#6; Wilson (CF)	#5; Brett (3B)	#3; Orta (DH)	#15; Sheridan (RF)	#20; White (2B)	#45; Balboni (1B)	#8; Sundberg (C)	#1; Biancalana (SS)
2	October 9	@ TOR	#21; Smith (LF)	#6; Wilson (CF)	#5; Brett (3B)	#11; McRae (DH)	#20; White (2B)	#45; Balboni (1B)	#24; Motley (RF)	#8; Sundberg (C)	#1; Biancalana (SS)
3	October 11	TOR	#21; Smith (LF)	#6; Wilson (CF)	#5; Brett (3B)	#11; McRae (DH)	#20; White (2B)	#15; Sheridan (RF)	#45; Balboni (1B)	#8; Sundberg (C)	#1; Biancalana (SS)
4	October 12	TOR	#21; Smith (LF)	#6; Wilson (CF)	#5; Brett (3B)	#11; McRae (DH)	#15; Sheridan (RF)	#20; White (2B)	#45; Balboni (1B)	#8; Sundberg (C)	#1; Biancalana (SS)
5	October 13	TOR	#21; Smith (LF)	#6; Wilson (CF)	#5; Brett (3B)	#11; McRae (DH)	#20; White (2B)	#45; Balboni (1B)	#24; Motley (RF)	#8; Sundberg (C)	#1; Biancalana (SS)
6	October 15	@ TOR	#21; Smith (LF)	#6; Wilson (CF)	#5; Brett (3B)	#11; McRae (DH)	#15; Sheridan (RF)	#45; Balboni (1B)	#8; Sundberg (C)	#20; White (2B)	#1; Biancalana (SS)
7	October 16	@ TOR	#21; Smith (LF)	#6; Wilson (CF)	#5; Brett (3B)	#11; McRae (DH)	#15; Sheridan (RF)	#45; Balboni (1B)	#8; Sundberg (C)	#20; White (2B)	#1; Biancalana (SS)

World Series: vs. St. Louis Cardinals

#	Date	Opponent	1st	2nd	3rd	4th	5th	6th	7th	8th	9th
1	October 19	STL	#21; Smith (LF)	#6; Wilson (CF)	#5; Brett (3B)	#20; White (2B)	#8; Sundberg (C)	#24; Motley (RF)	#45; Balboni (1B)	#1; Biancalana (SS)	#25; Jackson (SP)
2	October 20	STL	#21; Smith (LF)	#6; Wilson (CF)	#5; Brett (3B)	#20; White (2B)	#15; Sheridan (RF)	#8; Sundberg (C)	#45; Balboni (1B)	#1; Biancalana (SS)	#37; Leibrandt (SP)
3	October 22	@ STL	#21; Smith (LF)	#6; Wilson (CF)	#5; Brett (3B)	#20; White (2B)	#15; Sheridan (RF)	#8; Sundberg (C)	#45; Balboni (1B)	#1; Biancalana (SS)	#31; Saberhagen (SP)
4	October 23	@ STL	#21; Smith (LF)	#6; Wilson (CF)	#5; Brett (3B)	#20; White (2B)	#8; Sundberg (C)	#24; Motley (RF)	#45; Balboni (1B)	#1; Biancalana (SS)	#40; Black (SP)
5	October 24	@ STL	#21; Smith (LF)	#6; Wilson (CF)	#5; Brett (3B)	#20; White (2B)	#15; Sheridan (RF)	#45; Balboni (1B)	#8; Sundberg (C)	#1; Biancalana (SS)	#25; Jackson (SP)
6	October 26	STL	#21; Smith (LF)	#6; Wilson (CF)	#5; Brett (3B)	#20; White (2B)	#15; Sheridan (RF)	#45; Balboni (1B)	#8; Sundberg (C)	#1; Biancalana (SS)	#37; Leibrandt (SP)
7	October 27	STL	#21; Smith (LF)	#6; Wilson (CF)	#5; Brett (3B)	#20; White (2B)	#8; Sundberg (C)	#45; Balboni (1B)	#24; Motley (RF)	#1; Biancalana (SS)	#31; Saberhagen (SP)

==== Defensive Lineup ====
1985 Postseason Defensive Lineup game log
AL Championship Series: vs. Toronto Blue Jays

#	Date	Opponent	C	1B	2B	3B	SS	LF	CF	RF	P
1	October 8	@ TOR	#8; Sundberg	#45; Balboni	#20; White	#5; Brett	#1; Biancalana	#21; Smith	#6; Wilson	#15; Sheridan	#37; Leibrandt
2	October 9	@ TOR	#8; Sundberg	#45; Balboni	#20; White	#5; Brett	#1; Biancalana	#21; Smith	#6; Wilson	#24; Motley	#40; Black
3	October 11	TOR	#8; Sundberg	#45; Balboni	#20; White	#5; Brett	#1; Biancalana	#21; Smith	#6; Wilson	#15; Sheridan	#31; Saberhagen
4	October 12	TOR	#8; Sundberg	#45; Balboni	#20; White	#5; Brett	#1; Biancalana	#21; Smith	#6; Wilson	#15; Sheridan	#37; Leibrandt
5	October 13	TOR	#8; Sundberg	#45; Balboni	#20; White	#5; Brett	#1; Biancalana	#21; Smith	#6; Wilson	#24; Motley	#25; Jackson
6	October 15	@ TOR	#8; Sundberg	#45; Balboni	#20; White	#5; Brett	#1; Biancalana	#21; Smith	#6; Wilson	#15; Sheridan	#23; Gubicza
7	October 16	@ TOR	#8; Sundberg	#45; Balboni	#20; White	#5; Brett	#1; Biancalana	#21; Smith	#6; Wilson	#15; Sheridan	#31; Saberhagen

World Series: vs. St. Louis Cardinals

#	Date	Opponent	C	1B	2B	3B	SS	LF	CF	RF	P
1	October 19	STL	#8; Sundberg	#45; Balboni	#20; White	#5; Brett	#1; Biancalana	#21; Smith	#6; Wilson	#24; Motley	#25; Jackson
2	October 20	STL	#8; Sundberg	#45; Balboni	#20; White	#5; Brett	#1; Biancalana	#21; Smith	#6; Wilson	#15; Sheridan	#37; Leibrandt
3	October 22	@ STL	#8; Sundberg	#45; Balboni	#20; White	#5; Brett	#1; Biancalana	#21; Smith	#6; Wilson	#15; Sheridan	#31; Saberhagen
4	October 23	@ STL	#8; Sundberg	#45; Balboni	#20; White	#5; Brett	#1; Biancalana	#21; Smith	#6; Wilson	#24; Motley	#40; Black
5	October 24	@ STL	#8; Sundberg	#45; Balboni	#20; White	#5; Brett	#1; Biancalana	#21; Smith	#6; Wilson	#15; Sheridan	#25; Jackson
6	October 26	STL	#8; Sundberg	#45; Balboni	#20; White	#5; Brett	#1; Biancalana	#21; Smith	#6; Wilson	#15; Sheridan	#37; Leibrandt
7	October 27	STL	#8; Sundberg	#45; Balboni	#20; White	#5; Brett	#1; Biancalana	#21; Smith	#6; Wilson	#24; Motley	#31; Saberhagen

== Game Umpires ==
=== Regular Season ===
1985 Regular Season Umpire game log
April

#	Date	Opponent	HP	1B	2B	3B
1	April 8	TOR	#11; Don Denkinger (crew chief)	#24; Al Clark	#31; Mike Reilly	#37; Drew Coble
2	April 10	TOR	#24; Al Clark	#31; Mike Reilly	#37; Drew Coble	#11; Don Denkinger (crew chief)
3	April 11	TOR	#31; Mike Reilly	#37; Drew Coble	#11; Don Denkinger (crew chief)	#24; Al Clark
4	April 13	DET	#37; Drew Coble	#11; Don Denkinger (crew chief)	#24; Al Clark	#31; Mike Reilly
5	April 14	DET	#11; Don Denkinger (crew chief)	#24; Al Clark	#31; Mike Reilly	#37; Drew Coble
6	April 16	BOS	#35; Ted Hendry	#34; Dan Morrison	#3; Jim Evans (crew chief)	#2; Nick Bremigan
7	April 17	BOS	#34; Dan Morrison	#3; Jim Evans (crew chief)	#2; Nick Bremigan	#35; Ted Hendry
8	April 18	BOS	#3; Jim Evans (crew chief)	#2; Nick Bremigan	#35; Ted Hendry	#34; Dan Morrison
9	April 19	@ DET	#22; Larry Barnett (crew chief)	#20; Dale Ford	#21; Ken Kaiser	#27; Rocky Roe
10	April 20	@ DET	#20; Dale Ford	#21; Ken Kaiser	#27; Rocky Roe	#22; Larry Barnett (crew chief)
11	April 21	@ DET	#21; Ken Kaiser	#27; Rocky Roe	#22; Larry Barnett (crew chief)	#20; Dale Ford
12	April 22	@ TOR	#31; Mike Reilly	#37; Drew Coble	#11; Don Denkinger (crew chief)	#24; Al Clark
13	April 23	@ TOR	#37; Drew Coble	#11; Don Denkinger (crew chief)	#24; Al Clark	#31; Mike Reilly
14	April 24	@ TOR	#11; Don Denkinger (crew chief)	#24; Al Clark	#31; Mike Reilly	#37; Drew Coble
15	April 26	@ BOS	#34; Dan Morrison	#3; Jim Evans (crew chief)	#2; Nick Bremigan	#35; Ted Hendry
16	April 27	@ BOS	#3; Jim Evans (crew chief)	#2; Nick Bremigan	#35; Ted Hendry	#34; Dan Morrison
17	April 28	@ BOS	#2; Nick Bremigan	#35; Ted Hendry	#34; Dan Morrison	#3; Jim Evans (crew chief)
18	April 29	CLE	#26; Vic Voltaggio	#4; Marty Springstead (crew chief)	#8; Jim McKean	#33; Durwood Merrill
19	April 30	CLE	#4; Marty Springstead (crew chief)	#8; Jim McKean	#33; Durwood Merrill	#26; Vic Voltaggio

May

#	Date	Opponent	HP	1B	2B	3B
20	May 1	CLE	#8; Jim McKean	#33; Durwood Merrill	#26; Vic Voltaggio	#4; Marty Springstead (crew chief)
21	May 3	@ NYY	#12; Terry Cooney	#13; Derryl Cousins	#30; Tim Welke	#15; Joe Brinkman (crew chief)
22	May 4	@ NYY	#13; Derryl Cousins	#30; Tim Welke	#15; Joe Brinkman (crew chief)	#12; Terry Cooney
23	May 5	@ NYY	#30; Tim Welke	#15; Joe Brinkman (crew chief)	#12; Terry Cooney	#13; Derryl Cousins
24	May 7	BAL	#22; Larry Barnett (crew chief)	#27; Rocky Roe	(none)	#20; Dale Ford
25	May 8	BAL	#27; Rocky Roe	#20; Dale Ford	#21; Ken Kaiser	#22; Larry Barnett (crew chief)
26	May 10	NYY	#21; Ken Kaiser	#20; Dale Ford	#22; Larry Barnett (crew chief)	#27; Rocky Roe
27	May 11	NYY	#20; Dale Ford	#22; Larry Barnett (crew chief)	#27; Rocky Roe	#21; Ken Kaiser
28	May 12	NYY	#22; Larry Barnett (crew chief)	#27; Rocky Roe	#21; Ken Kaiser	#20; Dale Ford
29	May 13	@ BAL	#33; Durwood Merrill	#26; Vic Voltaggio	#4; Marty Springstead (crew chief)	#8; Jim McKean
30	May 14	@ BAL	#26; Vic Voltaggio	#4; Marty Springstead (crew chief)	#8; Jim McKean	#33; Durwood Merrill
31	May 15	@ CLE	#7; Dave Phillips	#6; Jerry Neudecker (crew chief)	#10; Larry McCoy	#14; Steve Palermo
32	May 16	@ CLE	#6; Jerry Neudecker (crew chief)	#10; Larry McCoy	#14; Steve Palermo	#7; Dave Phillips
33	May 17	@ MIL	#35; Ted Hendry	#34; Dan Morrison	#3; Jim Evans (crew chief)	#2; Nick Bremigan
34	May 18	@ MIL	#34; Dan Morrison	#3; Jim Evans (crew chief)	#2; Nick Bremigan	#35; Ted Hendry
35	May 19	@ MIL	#3; Jim Evans (crew chief)	#2; Nick Bremigan	#35; Ted Hendry	#34; Dan Morrison
36	May 20	@ TEX	#6; Jerry Neudecker (crew chief)	#10; Larry McCoy	#14; Steve Palermo	#7; Dave Phillips
37	May 21	@ TEX	#10; Larry McCoy	#14; Steve Palermo	#7; Dave Phillips	#6; Jerry Neudecker (crew chief)
38	May 22	@ TEX	#14; Steve Palermo	#7; Dave Phillips (crew chief)	(none)	#10; Larry McCoy
39	May 24	CWS	#7; Dave Phillips	#6; Jerry Neudecker (crew chief)	#10; Larry McCoy	#14; Steve Palermo
40	May 25	CWS	#6; Jerry Neudecker (crew chief)	#10; Larry McCoy	#14; Steve Palermo	#7; Dave Phillips
41	May 26	CWS	#10; Larry McCoy	#14; Steve Palermo	#7; Dave Phillips	#6; Jerry Neudecker (crew chief)
42	May 27	TEX	#34; Dan Morrison	#3; Jim Evans (crew chief)	#2; Nick Bremigan	#35; Ted Hendry
43	May 28	TEX	#3; Jim Evans (crew chief)	#2; Nick Bremigan	#35; Ted Hendry	#34; Dan Morrison
44	May 29	TEX	#2; Nick Bremigan	#35; Ted Hendry	#34; Dan Morrison	#3; Jim Evans (crew chief)
45	May 30	@ CWS	#35; Ted Hendry	#34; Dan Morrison	(none)	#3; Jim Evans (crew chief)
46	May 31	@ CWS	#34; Dan Morrison	#3; Jim Evans (crew chief)	#2; Nick Bremigan	#35; Ted Hendry

June

#	Date	Opponent	HP	1B	2B	3B
47	June 1	@ CWS	#3; Jim Evans (crew chief)	#2; Nick Bremigan	#35; Ted Hendry	#34; Dan Morrison
48	June 2	@ CWS	#2; Nick Bremigan	#35; Ted Hendry	#34; Dan Morrison	#3; Jim Evans (crew chief)
49	June 4	MIL	#13; Derryl Cousins	#29; John Shulock	#15; Joe Brinkman (crew chief)	#12; Terry Cooney
50	June 5	MIL	#29; John Shulock	#15; Joe Brinkman (crew chief)	#12; Terry Cooney	#13; Derryl Cousins
51	June 7	@ CAL	#24; Al Clark	#31; Mike Reilly	#37; Drew Coble	#11; Don Denkinger (crew chief)
52	June 8	@ CAL	#31; Mike Reilly	#37; Drew Coble	#11; Don Denkinger (crew chief)	#24; Al Clark
53	June 9	@ CAL	#37; Drew Coble	#11; Don Denkinger (crew chief)	#24; Al Clark	#31; Mike Reilly
54	June 10	@ OAK	#21; Ken Kaiser	#20; Dale Ford	#17; John Hirschbeck	#22; Larry Barnett (crew chief)
55	June 11	@ OAK	#20; Dale Ford	#17; John Hirschbeck	#22; Larry Barnett (crew chief)	#21; Ken Kaiser
56	June 12	@ OAK	#17; John Hirschbeck	#22; Larry Barnett (crew chief)	#21; Ken Kaiser	#20; Dale Ford
57	June 13	@ SEA	#25; Mark Johnson	#2; Nick Bremigan	#35; Ted Hendry	#3; Jim Evans (crew chief)
58	June 14	@ SEA	#2; Nick Bremigan	#35; Ted Hendry	#3; Jim Evans (crew chief)	#25; Mark Johnson
59	June 15	@ SEA	#35; Ted Hendry	#3; Jim Evans (crew chief)	#25; Mark Johnson	#2; Nick Bremigan
60	June 16	@ SEA	#3; Jim Evans (crew chief)	#25; Mark Johnson	#2; Nick Bremigan	#35; Ted Hendry
61	June 17	MIN	#10; Larry McCoy	#14; Steve Palermo	#7; Dave Phillips	#6; Jerry Neudecker (crew chief)
62	June 18	MIN	#14; Steve Palermo	#7; Dave Phillips	#6; Jerry Neudecker (crew chief)	#10; Larry McCoy
63	June 19	MIN	#7; Dave Phillips	#6; Jerry Neudecker (crew chief)	#10; Larry McCoy	#14; Steve Palermo
64	June 20	MIN	#6; Jerry Neudecker (crew chief)	#10; Larry McCoy	#14; Steve Palermo	#7; Dave Phillips
65	June 22	SEA	#36; Tim McClelland	#28; Larry Young	#18; Greg Kosc	#19; Rich Garcia (crew chief)
66	June 23	SEA	#28; Larry Young	#18; Greg Kosc	#19; Rich Garcia (crew chief)	#36; Tim McClelland
67	June 24	@ MIN	#31; Mike Reilly	#37; Drew Coble	#11; Don Denkinger (crew chief)	#24; Al Clark
68	June 25	@ MIN	#37; Drew Coble	#11; Don Denkinger (crew chief)	#24; Al Clark	#31; Mike Reilly
69	June 26	@ MIN	#11; Don Denkinger (crew chief)	#24; Al Clark	#31; Mike Reilly	#37; Drew Coble
70	June 28	CAL	#8; Jim McKean	#4; Marty Springstead (crew chief)	#30; Tim Welke	#26; Vic Voltaggio
71	June 29	CAL	#4; Marty Springstead (crew chief)	#30; Tim Welke	#26; Vic Voltaggio	#8; Jim McKean
72	June 30	CAL	#30; Tim Welke	#26; Vic Voltaggio	#8; Jim McKean	#4; Marty Springstead (crew chief)

July

#	Date	Opponent	HP	1B	2B	3B
73	July 1	OAK	#36; Tim McClelland	#23; Rick Reed	#18; Greg Kosc	#19; Rich Garcia (crew chief)
74	July 2	OAK	#23; Rick Reed	#18; Greg Kosc	#19; Rich Garcia (crew chief)	#36; Tim McClelland
75	July 3	OAK	#18; Greg Kosc	#19; Rich Garcia (crew chief)	#36; Tim McClelland	#23; Rick Reed
76	July 4	BAL	#10; Larry McCoy	#17; John Hirschbeck	#7; Dave Phillips	#6; Jerry Neudecker (crew chief)
77	July 5	BAL	#17; John Hirschbeck	#7; Dave Phillips	#6; Jerry Neudecker (crew chief)	#10; Larry McCoy
78	July 6	BAL	#7; Dave Phillips	#6; Jerry Neudecker (crew chief)	#10; Larry McCoy	#17; John Hirschbeck
79	July 7	BAL	#6; Jerry Neudecker (crew chief)	#10; Larry McCoy	#17; John Hirschbeck	#7; Dave Phillips
80	July 8	@ NYY	#26; Vic Voltaggio	#33; Durwood Merrill	#8; Jim McKean	#4; Marty Springstead (crew chief)
81	July 9	@ NYY	#33; Durwood Merrill	#8; Jim McKean	#4; Marty Springstead (crew chief)	#26; Vic Voltaggio
82	July 10	@ NYY	#8; Jim McKean	#4; Marty Springstead (crew chief)	#26; Vic Voltaggio	#33; Durwood Merrill
83	July 11	@ CLE	#31; Mike Reilly	#37; Drew Coble	#25; Mark Johnson	#24; Al Clark (crew chief)
84	July 12	@ CLE	#37; Drew Coble	#25; Mark Johnson	#24; Al Clark (crew chief)	#31; Mike Reilly
85	July 13	@ CLE	#25; Mark Johnson	#24; Al Clark (crew chief)	#31; Mike Reilly	#37; Drew Coble
86	July 14	@ CLE	#24; Al Clark (crew chief)	#31; Mike Reilly	#37; Drew Coble	#25; Mark Johnson
87	July 18	@ BAL	#20; Dale Ford	#6; Jerry Neudecker (crew chief)	#14; Steve Palermo	#7; Dave Phillips
88	July 19	@ BAL	#6; Jerry Neudecker (crew chief)	#14; Steve Palermo	#7; Dave Phillips	#20; Dale Ford
89	July 20	@ BAL	#14; Steve Palermo	#7; Dave Phillips	#20; Dale Ford	#6; Jerry Neudecker (crew chief)
90	July 21	@ BAL	#7; Dave Phillips	#20; Dale Ford	#6; Jerry Neudecker (crew chief)	#14; Steve Palermo
91	July 22	NYY	#35; Ted Hendry	#2; Nick Bremigan (crew chief)	#34; Dan Morrison	#28; Larry Young
92	July 23	NYY	#2; Nick Bremigan (crew chief)	#34; Dan Morrison	#28; Larry Young	#35; Ted Hendry
93	July 24	NYY	#34; Dan Morrison	#28; Larry Young	#35; Ted Hendry	#2; Nick Bremigan (crew chief)
94	July 26	CLE	#8; Jim McKean	#4; Marty Springstead (crew chief)	#26; Vic Voltaggio	#33; Durwood Merrill
95	July 27	CLE	#4; Marty Springstead (crew chief)	#26; Vic Voltaggio	#33; Durwood Merrill	#8; Jim McKean
96	July 28	CLE	#26; Vic Voltaggio	#33; Durwood Merrill	#8; Jim McKean	#4; Marty Springstead (crew chief)
97	July 29	@ DET	#30; Tim Welke	#6; Jerry Neudecker (crew chief)	#17; John Hirschbeck	#14; Steve Palermo
98	July 30	@ DET	#6; Jerry Neudecker (crew chief)	#17; John Hirschbeck	#14; Steve Palermo	#30; Tim Welke
99	July 31	@ DET	#17; John Hirschbeck	#14; Steve Palermo	#30; Tim Welke	#6; Jerry Neudecker (crew chief)

August

#	Date	Opponent	HP	1B	2B	3B
100	August 2	BOS	#25; Mark Johnson	#27; Rocky Roe	#20; Dale Ford (crew chief)	#21; Ken Kaiser
101	August 3	BOS	#27; Rocky Roe	#20; Dale Ford (crew chief)	#21; Ken Kaiser	#25; Mark Johnson
102	August 4	BOS	#20; Dale Ford (crew chief)	#21; Ken Kaiser	#25; Mark Johnson	#27; Rocky Roe
103	August 5	DET	#35; Ted Hendry	#34; Dan Morrison	#28; Larry Young	#3; Jim Evans (crew chief)
104	August 8	DET	#34; Dan Morrison	#28; Larry Young	#3; Jim Evans (crew chief)	#35; Ted Hendry
105	August 8	DET	#28; Larry Young	#3; Jim Evans (crew chief)	#35; Ted Hendry	#34; Dan Morrison
106	August 9	TOR	#18; Greg Kosc	#19; Rich Garcia (crew chief)	#36; Tim McClelland	#23; Rick Reed
107	August 10	TOR	#19; Rich Garcia (crew chief)	#36; Tim McClelland	#23; Rick Reed	#18; Greg Kosc
108	August 11	TOR	#36; Tim McClelland	#23; Rick Reed	#18; Greg Kosc	#19; Rich Garcia (crew chief)
109	August 12	@ BOS	#28; Larry Young	#3; Jim Evans (crew chief)	#35; Ted Hendry	#34; Dan Morrison
110	August 13	@ BOS	#3; Jim Evans (crew chief)	#35; Ted Hendry	#34; Dan Morrison	#28; Larry Young
111	August 14	@ BOS	#35; Ted Hendry	#34; Dan Morrison	#28; Larry Young	#3; Jim Evans (crew chief)
112	August 16	@ TOR	#25; Mark Johnson	#21; Ken Kaiser	#27; Rocky Roe	#22; Larry Barnett (crew chief)
113	August 17	@ TOR	#21; Ken Kaiser	#27; Rocky Roe	#22; Larry Barnett (crew chief)	#25; Mark Johnson
114	August 18	@ TOR	#27; Rocky Roe	#22; Larry Barnett (crew chief)	#25; Mark Johnson	#21; Ken Kaiser
115	August 19	DET	#35; Ted Hendry	#34; Dan Morrison	#3; Jim Evans (crew chief)	#5; Dale Scott
116	August 20	@ CWS	#26; Vic Voltaggio	#33; Durwood Merrill	#30; Tim Welke	#4; Marty Springstead (crew chief)
117	August 21	@ CWS	#33; Durwood Merrill	#30; Tim Welke	#4; Marty Springstead (crew chief)	#26; Vic Voltaggio
118	August 22	@ CWS	#30; Tim Welke	#4; Marty Springstead (crew chief)	#26; Vic Voltaggio	#33; Durwood Merrill
119	August 23	TEX	#12; Terry Cooney	#13; Derryl Cousins	#29; John Shulock	#15; Joe Brinkman (crew chief)
120	August 24	TEX	#13; Derryl Cousins	#29; John Shulock	#15; Joe Brinkman (crew chief)	#12; Terry Cooney
121	August 25	TEX	#29; John Shulock	#15; Joe Brinkman (crew chief)	#12; Terry Cooney	#13; Derryl Cousins
122	August 26	TEX	#15; Joe Brinkman (crew chief)	#12; Terry Cooney	#13; Derryl Cousins	#29; John Shulock
123	August 27	@ MIL	#36; Tim McClelland	#23; Rick Reed	#28; Larry Young	#19; Rich Garcia (crew chief)
124	August 28	@ MIL	#23; Rick Reed	#28; Larry Young	#19; Rich Garcia (crew chief)	#36; Tim McClelland
125	August 30	@ TEX	#31; Mike Reilly	#37; Drew Coble	#25; Mark Johnson	#11; Don Denkinger (crew chief)
126	August 31	@ TEX	#37; Drew Coble	#25; Mark Johnson	#11; Don Denkinger (crew chief)	#31; Mike Reilly

September

#	Date	Opponent	HP	1B	2B	3B
127	September 1	@ TEX	#25; Mark Johnson	#11; Don Denkinger (crew chief)	#31; Mike Reilly	#37; Drew Coble
128	September 2	CWS	#23; Rick Reed	#28; Larry Young	#19; Rich Garcia (crew chief)	#18; Greg Kosc
129	September 3	CWS	#28; Larry Young	#19; Rich Garcia (crew chief)	#18; Greg Kosc	#23; Rick Reed
130	September 4	CWS	#19; Rich Garcia (crew chief)	#18; Greg Kosc	#23; Rick Reed	#28; Larry Young
131	September 5	MIL	#18; Greg Kosc	#23; Rick Reed	#28; Larry Young	#19; Rich Garcia (crew chief)
132	September 6	MIL	#11; Don Denkinger (crew chief)	#24; Al Clark	#30; Tim Welke	#17; John Hirschbeck
133	September 6	MIL	#24; Al Clark	#30; Tim Welke	#17; John Hirschbeck	#11; Don Denkinger (crew chief)
134	September 7	MIL	#30; Tim Welke	#17; John Hirschbeck	#11; Don Denkinger (crew chief)	#24; Al Clark
135	September 8	MIL	#17; John Hirschbeck	#11; Don Denkinger (crew chief)	#24; Al Clark	#30; Tim Welke
136	September 9	@ CAL	#29; John Shulock	#15; Joe Brinkman (crew chief)	#30; Tim Welke	#52; Tim Tschida
137	September 10	@ CAL	#15; Joe Brinkman (crew chief)	#30; Tim Welke	#52; Tim Tschida	#29; John Shulock
138	September 11	@ CAL	#30; Tim Welke	#52; Tim Tschida	#29; John Shulock	#15; Joe Brinkman (crew chief)
139	September 13	@ OAK	#19; Rich Garcia (crew chief)	#18; Greg Kosc	#23; Rick Reed	#28; Larry Young
140	September 14	@ OAK	#18; Greg Kosc	#23; Rick Reed	#28; Larry Young	#19; Rich Garcia (crew chief)
141	September 15	@ OAK	#23; Rick Reed	#28; Larry Young	#19; Rich Garcia (crew chief)	#18; Greg Kosc
142	September 15	@ OAK	#28; Larry Young	#19; Rich Garcia (crew chief)	#18; Greg Kosc	#23; Rick Reed
143	September 16	SEA	#13; Derryl Cousins	#29; John Shulock	#30; Tim Welke	#15; Joe Brinkman (crew chief)
144	September 17	SEA	#29; John Shulock	#30; Tim Welke	#15; Joe Brinkman (crew chief)	#13; Derryl Cousins
145	September 18	SEA	#30; Tim Welke	#15; Joe Brinkman (crew chief)	#13; Derryl Cousins	#29; John Shulock
146	September 19	SEA	#15; Joe Brinkman (crew chief)	#13; Derryl Cousins	#29; John Shulock	#30; Tim Welke
147	September 20	MIN	#36; Tim McClelland	#19; Rich Garcia (crew chief)	#18; Greg Kosc	#23; Rick Reed
148	September 21	MIN	#19; Rich Garcia (crew chief)	#18; Greg Kosc	#23; Rick Reed	#36; Tim McClelland
149	September 22	MIN	#18; Greg Kosc	#23; Rick Reed	#36; Tim McClelland	#19; Rich Garcia (crew chief)
150	September 24	@ SEA	#14; Steve Palermo	#7; Dave Phillips	#6; Jerry Neudecker (crew chief)	#10; Larry McCoy
151	September 25	@ SEA	#7; Dave Phillips	#6; Jerry Neudecker (crew chief)	#10; Larry McCoy	#14; Steve Palermo
152	September 26	@ SEA	#6; Jerry Neudecker (crew chief)	#10; Larry McCoy	#14; Steve Palermo	#7; Dave Phillips
153	September 27	@ MIN	#26; Vic Voltaggio	#33; Durwood Merrill	#8; Jim McKean	#4; Marty Springstead (crew chief)
154	September 28	@ MIN	#33; Durwood Merrill	#8; Jim McKean	#4; Marty Springstead (crew chief)	#26; Vic Voltaggio
155	September 29	@ MIN	#8; Jim McKean	#4; Marty Springstead (crew chief)	#26; Vic Voltaggio	#33; Durwood Merrill
156	September 30	CAL	#18; Greg Kosc	#23; Rick Reed	#36; Tim McClelland	#19; Rich Garcia (crew chief)

October

#	Date	Opponent	HP	1B	2B	3B
157	October 1	CAL	#23; Rick Reed	#36; Tim McClelland	#19; Rich Garcia (crew chief)	#18; Greg Kosc
158	October 2	CAL	#36; Tim McClelland	#19; Rich Garcia (crew chief)	#18; Greg Kosc	#23; Rick Reed
159	October 3	CAL	#19; Rich Garcia (crew chief)	#18; Greg Kosc	#23; Rick Reed	#36; Tim McClelland
160	October 4	OAK	#8; Jim McKean	#4; Marty Springstead (crew chief)	#26; Vic Voltaggio	#33; Durwood Merrill
161	October 5	OAK	#4; Marty Springstead (crew chief)	#26; Vic Voltaggio	#33; Durwood Merrill	#8; Jim McKean
162	October 6	OAK	#26; Vic Voltaggio	#33; Durwood Merrill	#8; Jim McKean	#4; Marty Springstead (crew chief)

=== Postseason ===
1985 Postseason Umpire game log
AL Championship Series: vs. Toronto Blue Jays

#	Date	Opponent	HP	1B	2B	3B	LF	RF
1	October 8	@ TOR	#7; Dave Phillips (crew chief)	#20; Dale Ford	#3; Jim Evans	#35; Ted Hendry	#26; Vic Voltaggio	#13; Derryl Cousins
2	October 9	@ TOR	#20; Dale Ford	#3; Jim Evans	#35; Ted Hendry	#26; Vic Voltaggio	#13; Derryl Cousins	#7; Dave Phillips (crew chief)
3	October 11	TOR	#3; Jim Evans	#35; Ted Hendry	#26; Vic Voltaggio	#13; Derryl Cousins	#7; Dave Phillips (crew chief)	#20; Dale Ford
4	October 12	TOR	#35; Ted Hendry	#26; Vic Voltaggio	#13; Derryl Cousins	#7; Dave Phillips (crew chief)	#20; Dale Ford	#3; Jim Evans
5	October 13	TOR	#26; Vic Voltaggio	#13; Derryl Cousins	#7; Dave Phillips (crew chief)	#20; Dale Ford	#3; Jim Evans	#35; Ted Hendry
6	October 15	@ TOR	#13; Derryl Cousins	#7; Dave Phillips (crew chief)	#20; Dale Ford	#3; Jim Evans	#35; Ted Hendry	#26; Vic Voltaggio
7	October 16	@ TOR	#7; Dave Phillips (crew chief)	#20; Dale Ford	#3; Jim Evans	#35; Ted Hendry	#26; Vic Voltaggio	#13; Derryl Cousins

World Series: vs. St. Louis Cardinals

#	Date	Opponent	HP	1B	2B	3B	LF	RF
1	October 19	STL	#11; Don Denkinger (AL) (crew chief)	#24; Billy Williams (NL)	#8; Jim McKean (AL)	#5; Bob Engel (NL)	#29; John Shulock (AL)	#15; Jim Quick (NL)
2	October 20	STL	#24; Billy Williams (NL)	#8; Jim McKean (AL)	#5; Bob Engel (NL)	#29; John Shulock (AL)	#15; Jim Quick (NL)	#11; Don Denkinger (AL) (crew chief)
3	October 22	@ STL	#8; Jim McKean (AL)	#5; Bob Engel (NL)	#29; John Shulock (AL)	#15; Jim Quick (NL)	#11; Don Denkinger (AL) (crew chief)	#24; Billy Williams (NL)
4	October 23	@ STL	#5; Bob Engel (NL)	#29; John Shulock (AL)	#15; Jim Quick (NL)	#11; Don Denkinger (AL) (crew chief)	#24; Billy Williams (NL)	#8; Jim McKean (AL)
5	October 24	@ STL	#29; John Shulock (AL)	#15; Jim Quick (NL)	#11; Don Denkinger (AL) (crew chief)	#24; Billy Williams (NL)	#8; Jim McKean (AL)	#5; Bob Engel (NL)
6	October 26	STL	#15; Jim Quick (NL)	#11; Don Denkinger (AL) (crew chief)	#24; Billy Williams (NL)	#8; Jim McKean (AL)	#5; Bob Engel (NL)	#29; John Shulock (AL)
7	October 27	STL	#11; Don Denkinger (AL) (crew chief)	#24; Billy Williams (NL)	#8; Jim McKean (AL)	#5; Bob Engel (NL)	#29; John Shulock (AL)	#15; Jim Quick (NL)

== Player stats ==
= Indicates team leader

=== Batting ===
==== Starters by position ====
Note: Pos = Position; G = Games played; AB = At bats; R = Runs; H = Hits; Avg. = Batting average; HR = Home runs; RBI = Runs batted in; SB = Stolen bases

Pos	Player	G	AB	R	H	HR	RBI	Avg.	SB
C	Jim Sundberg	115	367	38	90	10	35	.245	0
1B	Steve Balboni	160	600	74	146	36	88	.243	1
2B	Frank White	149	563	62	140	22	69	.249	10
3B	George Brett	155	550	108	184	30	112	.335	9
SS	Onix Concepción	131	314	32	64	2	20	.204	4
LF	Lonnie Smith	120	448	77	115	6	41	.257	40
CF	Willie Wilson	141	605	87	168	4	43	.278	43
RF	Darryl Motley	123	383	45	85	17	49	.222	6
DH	Hal McRae	112	320	41	83	14	70	.259	0

==== Other batters ====
Note: G = Games played; AB = At bats; R = Runs; H = Hits; HR = Home runs; RBI = Runs batted in; Avg. = Batting average; SB = Stolen bases

Player	G	AB	R	H	HR	RBI	Avg.	SB
Jorge Orta	110	300	32	80	4	45	.267	2
Pat Sheridan	78	206	18	47	3	17	.228	11
Lynn Jones	110	152	12	32	0	9	.211	0
John Wathan	60	145	11	34	1	9	.234	1
Buddy Biancalana	81	138	21	26	1	6	.188	1
Dane Iorg	64	130	7	29	1	21	.223	0
Greg Pryor	63	114	8	25	1	3	.219	0
Omar Moreno	24	70	9	17	2	12	.243	0
Jamie Quirk	19	57	3	16	0	4	.281	0
Dave Leeper	15	34	1	3	0	4	.088	0
Jim Scranton	6	4	1	0	0	0	.000	0
Bob Hegman	1	0	0	0	0	0	----	0

=== Pitching ===
= Indicates league leader

==== Starting pitchers ====
Note: G = Games pitched; GS = Games started; IP = Innings pitched; W = Wins; L = Losses; ERA = Earned run average; SO = Strikeouts; BB = Walks allowed

Player	G	GS	IP	W	L	ERA	SO	BB
Charlie Leibrandt	33	33	237.2	17	9	2.69	108	68
Bret Saberhagen	32	32	235.1	20	6	2.87	158	38
Danny Jackson	32	32	208.0	14	12	3.42	114	76
Bud Black	33	33	205.2	10	15	4.33	122	59
Mark Gubicza	29	28	177.1	14	10	4.06	99	77

==== Other pitchers ====
Note: G = Games pitched; IP = Innings pitched; W = Wins; L = Losses; SV = Saves; ERA = Earned run average; SO = Strikeouts

Player	G	IP	W	L	SV	ERA	SO
Steve Farr	16	37.2	2	1	1	3.11	36

==== Relief pitchers ====
Note: G = Games pitched; GS = Games started; W = Wins; L = Losses; SV = Saves; ERA = Earned run average; SO = Strikeouts

Player	G	GS	W	L	SV	ERA	SO
Dan Quisenberry	84	0	8	9	37	2.37	54
Joe Beckwith	49	0	1	5	1	4.07	80
Mike Jones	33	1	3	3	0	4.78	32
Mike LaCoss	21	0	1	1	1	5.09	26
Mark Huismann	9	0	1	0	0	1.93	9
Larry Gura	3	0	0	0	1	12.46	2
Tony Ferreira	2	0	0	0	0	7.94	5
Dennis Leonard	2	0	0	0	0	0.00	1

== Awards and honors ==
Cy Young Award
Bret Saberhagen
World Series MVP
Bret Saberhagen
Rolaids Relief Man of the Year Award
Dan Quisenberry
ALCS MVP
George Brett
Gold Glove Award
Third base—George Brett
Silver Slugger Award
Third base—George Brett
Executive of the Year
General Manager John Schuerholz

== Records and milestones ==
=== Batting ===
Triples

- Willie Wilson set the Royals single season record with 21 triples.

Home runs

- Steve Balboni set the Royals single season record with 36 home runs.

Strikeouts

- Steve Balboni set the Royals single season record with 166 strikeouts.

=== Pitching ===
Games pitched

- Dan Quisenberry set the Royals single season record with 84 games pitched and finished the season with 444 on the all-time Royals list, passing Paul Splittorff (with 429) for first place.

Saves

- Dan Quisenberry, first on the all-time Royals list, finishes the season with 217.

== Farm system ==
Level	Team	League	Manager
AAA	Omaha Royals	American Association	Gene Lamont
AA	Memphis Chicks	Southern League	Tommy Jones
A	Fort Myers Royals	Florida State League	Duane Gustavson
A-Short Season	Eugene Emeralds	Northwest League	Frank Funk
Rookie	GCL Royals	Gulf Coast League	Joe Jones

LEAGUE CHAMPIONS: Fort Myers
