= Dave Leeper =

American baseball player (born 1959)

- Outfielder
- Born: October 30, 1959 (age 66); Santa Ana, California, U.S.
- Batted: Switch Threw: Left

MLB debut
- September 10, 1984, for the Kansas City Royals

Last MLB appearance
- October 6, 1985, for the Kansas City Royals

MLB statistics
- Batting average: .075
- Home runs: 0
- Runs batted in: 4
- Stats at Baseball Reference

Teams
- Kansas City Royals (1984–1985)

David Dale Leeper (born October 30, 1959) is an American former professional baseball outfielder. He played for the Kansas City Royals of Major League Baseball (MLB).

== Biography ==
Leeper was born in Santa Ana, California and graduated from Villa Park High School in Villa Park, California. He played college baseball at the University of Southern California.

He was drafted by the Kansas City Royals in the 1st round (23rd pick) of the 1981 Major League Baseball draft. He played parts of two seasons in the majors for the Kansas City Royals in the 1984 season and the 1985 season. He managed three hits in 40 at bats.
