= 1985 Minnesota Twins season =

1985 Minnesota Twins
- League: American League
- Division: West
- Ballpark: Hubert H. Humphrey Metrodome
- City: Minneapolis, Minnesota
- Record: 77–85 (.475)
- Divisional place: 4th
- Owners: Carl Pohlad
- General managers: Howard Fox, Andy MacPhail
- Managers: Billy Gardner, Ray Miller
- Television: KMSP-TV (Bob Kurtz, Harmon Killebrew); Spectrum (Harmon Killebrew, Dick Bremer)
- Radio: 830 WCCO AM (Herb Carneal, Joe Angel)

The 1985 Minnesota Twins season was the 25th season for the Minnesota Twins franchise in the Twin Cities of Minnesota, their 4th season at Hubert H. Humphrey Metrodome and the 85th overall in the American League. The Twins finished with a record of 77–85, tied for fourth in the American League West, and 14 games behind the division winner and eventual World Series champion Kansas City Royals.

== Offseason ==
- October 17, 1984: Albert Williams was released by the Twins.
- January 3, 1985: Mike Benjamin was drafted by the Twins in the 7th round of the 1985 Major League Baseball draft, but did not sign.
- January 9, 1985: Jack O'Connor was traded by the Twins to the Montreal Expos for Mike Stenhouse.
- March 27, 1985: Brad Havens was traded by the Twins to the Baltimore Orioles for Mark Brown.

== Regular season ==
On June 20, after a disappointing start, manager Billy Gardner was replaced by Ray Miller.

Minnesota, the Twins and the Metrodome hosted the All-Star Game. Only one Twins player made the American League team, outfielder Tom Brunansky. Bruno finished second in the first-ever Home Run Derby, behind Dave Parker. Three Minnesota natives, not yet Twins, played as a team on the same major league field for the first and only time -- Dave Winfield, Jack Morris and Paul Molitor.

In Anaheim on August 4, pitcher Frank Viola gave up a double to longtime-Twin now-an Angel Rod Carew. The two-bagger was Carew's 3000th career hit.

The pitcher on the mound on September 25, as the Twins won their 2000th game, is the same pitcher that won Minnesota's 1000th game on July 12, 1972 -- Bert Blyleven.

1,651,814 fans attended Twins games, a Twins attendance record, but still the sixth lowest total in the American League.

=== Offense ===
Leadoff batter Kirby Puckett hit .288 and scored 80 runs. Kent Hrbek hit .311 with 21 HR and 93 RBI. Tom Brunansky hit 27 HR and 90 RBI. Gary Gaetti hit 20 HR and 63 RBI.

Team Leaders
Statistic	Player	Quantity
HR	Tom Brunansky	27
RBI	Kent Hrbek	93
BA	Kirby Puckett	.288
Runs	Kirby Puckett	80

=== Pitching ===
For the first time in years, the Twins had three solid starting pitchers: Frank Viola (18–14), Mike Smithson (15–14), and John Butcher (11–14). Reliever Ron Davis had 25 saves.

Team Leaders
Statistic	Player	Quantity
ERA	Frank Viola	4.09
Wins	Frank Viola	18
Saves	Ron Davis	25
Strikeouts	Frank Viola	135

=== Season standings ===
AL West
Team	W	L	Pct.	GB	Home	Road
Kansas City Royals	91	71	.562	—	50‍–‍32	41‍–‍39
California Angels	90	72	.556	1	49‍–‍30	41‍–‍42
Chicago White Sox	85	77	.525	6	45‍–‍36	40‍–‍41
Minnesota Twins	77	85	.475	14	49‍–‍35	28‍–‍50
Oakland Athletics	77	85	.475	14	43‍–‍36	34‍–‍49
Seattle Mariners	74	88	.457	17	42‍–‍41	32‍–‍47
Texas Rangers	62	99	.385	28½	37‍–‍43	25‍–‍56

=== Record vs. opponents ===
1985 American League record Sources:
Team	BAL	BOS	CAL	CWS	CLE	DET	KC	MIL	MIN	NYY	OAK	SEA	TEX	TOR
Baltimore	—	5–8	7–5	8–4	8–5	6–7	6–6	9–4	6–6	1–12	7–5	6–6	10–2	4–8
Boston	8–5	—	5–7	4–8–1	8–5	6–7	5–7	5–8	7–5	5–8	8–4	6–6	5–7	9–4
California	5–7	7–5	—	8–5	8–4	8–4	4–9	9–3	9–4	3–9	6–7	9–4	9–4	5–7
Chicago	4–8	8–4–1	5–8	—	10–2	6–6	5–8	5–7	6–7	6–6	8–5	9–4	10–3	3–9
Cleveland	5–8	5–8	4–8	2–10	—	5–8	2–10	7–6	4–8	6–7	3–9	6–6	7–5	4–9
Detroit	7–6	7–6	4–8	6–6	8–5	—	5–7	9–4	3–9	9–3	8–4	5–7	7–5	6–7
Kansas City	6–6	7–5	9–4	8–5	10–2	7–5	—	8–4	7–6	5–7	8–5	3–10	6–7	7–5
Milwaukee	4–9	8–5	3–9	7–5	6–7	4–9	4–8	—	9–3	7–6	3–9	4–8	8–3	4–9
Minnesota	6–6	5–7	4–9	7–6	8–4	9–3	6–7	3–9	—	3–9	8–5	6–7	8–5	4–8
New York	12–1	8–5	9–3	6–6	7–6	3–9	7–5	6–7	9–3	—	7–5	9–3	8–4	6–7
Oakland	5–7	4–8	7–6	5–8	9–3	4–8	5–8	9–3	5–8	5–7	—	8–5	6–7	5–7
Seattle	6–6	6–6	4–9	4–9	6–6	7–5	10–3	8–4	7–6	3–9	5–8	—	6–7	2–10
Texas	2–10	7–5	4–9	3–10	5–7	5–7	7–6	3–8	5–8	4–8	7–6	7–6	—	3–9
Toronto	8–4	4–9	7–5	9–3	9–4	7–6	5–7	9–4	8–4	7–6	7–5	10–2	9–3	—

=== Notable transactions ===
- April 4, 1985: Lenny Faedo was released by the Twins.
- August 1, 1985: Curt Wardle, Jay Bell, Jim Weaver, and a player to be named later were traded by the Twins to the Cleveland Indians for Bert Blyleven. The Twins completed the deal by sending Rich Yett to the Indians on September 17.
- The Twins drafted pitcher Jeff Bumgarner with the thirteenth overall pick in the 1985 Draft.

=== Roster ===
1985 Minnesota Twins
Roster
Pitchers: 28 Bert Blyleven; 27 Mark Brown; 17 Dennis Burtt; 32 John Butcher; 39 Ron Davis; 26 Frank Eufemia; 23 Pete Filson; 30 Steve Howe; 35 Tom Klawitter; 19 Rick Lysander; 36 Mark Portugal; 18 Ken Schrom; 48 Mike Smithson; 16 Frank Viola; 36 Curt Wardle; 22 Len Whitehouse; 37 Rich Yett	Catchers: 15 Tim Laudner; 10 Jeff Reed; 12 Mark Salas; Infielders: 1 Alvaro Espinoza; 8 Gary Gaetti; 31 Greg Gagne; 14 Kent Hrbek; 4 Steve Lombardozzi; 11 Tim Teufel; 38 Ron Washington	Outfielders: 24 Tom Brunansky; 25 Randy Bush; 9 Mickey Hatcher; 7 Dave Meier; 34 Kirby Puckett; Other batters: 20 Dave Engle; 40 Mark Funderburk; 5 Roy Smalley; 33 Mike Stenhouse	Manager: 42 Billy Gardner; 44 Ray Miller; Coaches: 41 Tom Kelly; 6 Tony Oliva; 46 Johnny Podres; 43 Rick Stelmaszek

== Player stats ==
= Indicates team leader

= Indicates league leader

=== Batting ===
==== Starters by position ====
Note: Pos = Position; G = Games played; AB = At bats; H = Hits; Avg. = Batting average; HR = Home runs; RBI = Runs batted in

Pos	Player	G	AB	H	Avg.	HR	RBI
C	Mark Salas	120	360	108	.300	9	41
1B	Kent Hrbek	158	593	165	.278	21	93
2B	Tim Teufel	138	434	113	.260	10	50
SS	Greg Gagne	114	293	66	.225	2	23
3B	Gary Gaetti	160	560	138	.246	20	63
LF	Mickey Hatcher	116	444	125	.282	3	49
CF	Kirby Puckett	161	691	199	.288	4	74
RF	Tom Brunansky	157	567	137	.242	27	90
DH	Roy Smalley	129	388	100	.258	12	45

==== Other batters ====
Note: G = Games played; AB = At bats; H = Hits; Avg. = Batting average; HR = Home runs; RBI = Runs batted in

Player	G	AB	H	Avg.	HR	RBI
Randy Bush	97	234	56	.239	10	35
Mike Stenhouse	81	179	40	.223	5	21
Dave Engle	70	172	44	.256	7	25
Tim Laudner	72	164	39	.238	7	19
Ron Washington	70	135	37	.274	1	14
Dave Meier	71	104	27	.260	1	8
Mark Funderburk	23	70	22	.314	2	13
Álvaro Espinoza	32	57	15	.263	0	9
Steve Lombardozzi	28	54	20	.370	0	6
Jeff Reed	7	10	2	.200	0	0

=== Pitching ===
==== Starting pitchers ====
Note: G = Games pitched; IP = Innings pitched; W = Wins; L = Losses; ERA = Earned run average; SO = Strikeouts

Player	G	IP	W	L	ERA	SO
Mike Smithson	37	257.0	15	14	4.34	127
Frank Viola	36	250.2	18	14	4.09	135
John Butcher	34	207.2	11	14	4.98	92
Ken Schrom	29	160.2	9	12	4.99	74
Bert Blyleven	14	114.0	8	5	3.00	77

==== Other pitchers ====
Note: G = Games pitched; IP = Innings pitched; W = Wins; L = Losses; ERA = Earned run average; SO = Strikeouts

Player	G	IP	W	L	ERA	SO
Pete Filson	40	95.2	4	5	3.67	42
Dennis Burtt	5	28.1	2	2	3.81	9
Mark Portugal	6	24.1	1	3	5.55	12
Tom Klawitter	7	9.1	0	0	6.75	5
Rich Yett	1	0.1	0	0	27.00	0

==== Relief pitchers ====
Note: G = Games pitched; W = Wins; L = Losses; SV = Saves; ERA = Earned run average; SO = Strikeouts

Player	G	W	L	SV	ERA	SO
Ron Davis	57	2	6	25	3.48	72
Frank Eufemia	39	4	2	2	3.79	30
Rick Lysander	35	0	2	3	6.05	26
Curt Wardle	35	1	3	1	5.51	47
Steve Howe	13	2	3	0	6.16	10
Mark Brown	6	0	0	0	6.89	5
Len Whitehouse	5	0	0	1	11.05	4

== Awards and honors ==
All-Star Game

- Tom Brunansky, OF, Roster

== Farm system ==
Level	Team	League	Manager
AAA	Toledo Mud Hens	International League	Cal Ermer
AA	Orlando Twins	Southern League	Charlie Manuel
A	Visalia Oaks	California League	Danny Schmitz
A	Kenosha Twins	Midwest League	Duffy Dyer
Rookie	Elizabethton Twins	Appalachian League	Fred Waters

LEAGUE CHAMPIONS: Kenosha
