= 1985 Cleveland Indians season =

1985 Cleveland Indians
- League: American League
- Division: East
- Ballpark: Cleveland Municipal Stadium
- City: Cleveland, Ohio
- Owners: Estate of F.J. "Steve" O'Neill
- General managers: Phil Seghi, Joe Klein
- Managers: Pat Corrales
- Television: WUAB
- Radio: WWWE

The 1985 Cleveland Indians season was the 85th for the franchise.

== Offseason ==
- October 15, 1984: Jamie Quirk was released by the Indians.
- October 15, 1984: Broderick Perkins was released by the Indians.
- January 7, 1985: Butch Benton was signed as a free agent with the Cleveland Indians.
- January 9, 1985: Dave Von Ohlen was signed as a free agent by the Indians.
- March 22, 1985: Jerry Ujdur was released by the Indians.

== Regular season ==
=== Season standings ===
AL East
Team	W	L	Pct.	GB	Home	Road
Toronto Blue Jays	99	62	.615	—	54‍–‍26	45‍–‍36
New York Yankees	97	64	.602	2	58‍–‍22	39‍–‍42
Detroit Tigers	84	77	.522	15	44‍–‍37	40‍–‍40
Baltimore Orioles	83	78	.516	16	45‍–‍36	38‍–‍42
Boston Red Sox	81	81	.500	18½	43‍–‍37	38‍–‍44
Milwaukee Brewers	71	90	.441	28	40‍–‍40	31‍–‍50
Cleveland Indians	60	102	.370	39½	38‍–‍43	22‍–‍59

=== Record vs. opponents ===
1985 American League record Sources:
Team	BAL	BOS	CAL	CWS	CLE	DET	KC	MIL	MIN	NYY	OAK	SEA	TEX	TOR
Baltimore	—	5–8	7–5	8–4	8–5	6–7	6–6	9–4	6–6	1–12	7–5	6–6	10–2	4–8
Boston	8–5	—	5–7	4–8–1	8–5	6–7	5–7	5–8	7–5	5–8	8–4	6–6	5–7	9–4
California	5–7	7–5	—	8–5	8–4	8–4	4–9	9–3	9–4	3–9	6–7	9–4	9–4	5–7
Chicago	4–8	8–4–1	5–8	—	10–2	6–6	5–8	5–7	6–7	6–6	8–5	9–4	10–3	3–9
Cleveland	5–8	5–8	4–8	2–10	—	5–8	2–10	7–6	4–8	6–7	3–9	6–6	7–5	4–9
Detroit	7–6	7–6	4–8	6–6	8–5	—	5–7	9–4	3–9	9–3	8–4	5–7	7–5	6–7
Kansas City	6–6	7–5	9–4	8–5	10–2	7–5	—	8–4	7–6	5–7	8–5	3–10	6–7	7–5
Milwaukee	4–9	8–5	3–9	7–5	6–7	4–9	4–8	—	9–3	7–6	3–9	4–8	8–3	4–9
Minnesota	6–6	5–7	4–9	7–6	8–4	9–3	6–7	3–9	—	3–9	8–5	6–7	8–5	4–8
New York	12–1	8–5	9–3	6–6	7–6	3–9	7–5	6–7	9–3	—	7–5	9–3	8–4	6–7
Oakland	5–7	4–8	7–6	5–8	9–3	4–8	5–8	9–3	5–8	5–7	—	8–5	6–7	5–7
Seattle	6–6	6–6	4–9	4–9	6–6	7–5	10–3	8–4	7–6	3–9	5–8	—	6–7	2–10
Texas	2–10	7–5	4–9	3–10	5–7	5–7	7–6	3–8	5–8	4–8	7–6	7–6	—	3–9
Toronto	8–4	4–9	7–5	9–3	9–4	7–6	5–7	9–4	8–4	7–6	7–5	10–2	9–3	—

=== Notable transactions ===
- April 3, 1985: Doug Jones was signed as a free agent by the Indians.
- April 19, 1985: Benny Ayala was signed as a free agent by the Indians.
- April 23, 1985: Geno Petralli was released by the Indians.
- May 7, 1985:Johnnie LeMaster was traded by the San Francisco Giants to the Cleveland Indians for Mike Jeffcoat and Luis Quiñones. Lemaster was made the starting shortstop. The previous shortstop, Julio Franco, moved to second base a position he had never played before, and Tony Bernazard benched in spite of his leading the team in home runs at the time. Bill James called these maneuvers 'strangest, most incomprehensible organizational stratagem in many years'.
- May 30, 1985: Johnnie LeMaster was traded by the Cleveland Indians to the Pittsburgh Pirates for a player to be named later.
- July 3, 1985: The Pittsburgh Pirates sent Scott Bailes to the Cleveland Indians to complete an earlier deal made on May 30, 1985, for Johnnie LeMaster.
- August 1, 1985: Bert Blyleven was traded by the Indians to the Minnesota Twins for Curt Wardle, Jay Bell, Jim Weaver and a player to be named later. The Minnesota Twins completed the deal by sending Rich Yett to the Indians on September 17.

==== Draft picks ====
- The Cleveland Indians drafted pitcher Mike Poehl with the ninth overall pick in the 1985 Draft.

=== Opening Day Lineup ===
Opening Day Starters
#	Name	Position
2	Brett Butler	CF
14	Julio Franco	SS
27	Mel Hall	LF
30	Joe Carter	DH
10	Pat Tabler	1B
26	Brook Jacoby	3B
24	George Vukovich	RF
23	Chris Bando	C
4	Tony Bernazard	2B
28	Bert Blyleven	P

=== Roster ===
1985 Cleveland Indians
Roster
Pitchers: 49 Jeff Barkley; 32 Rick Behenna; 28 Bert Blyleven; 13 Ernie Camacho; 43 Bryan Clark; 40 Keith Creel; 36 Jamie Easterly; 44 Neal Heaton; 46 Mike Jeffcoat; 35 Jerry Reed; 31 José Román; 50 Ramón Romero; 48 Vern Ruhle; 37 Don Schulze; 33 Roy Smith; 41 Rich Thompson; 38 Dave Von Ohlen; 54 Tom Waddell; 31 Curt Wardle	Catchers: 23 Chris Bando; 9 Butch Benton; 16 Jerry Willard; Infielders: 4 Tony Bernazard; 22 Mike Fischlin; 14 Julio Franco; 21 Mike Hargrove; 26 Brook Jacoby; 11 Johnnie LeMaster; 10 Pat Tabler; 58 Jim Wilson	Outfielders: 12 Benny Ayala; 2 Brett Butler; 30 Joe Carter; 8 Carmen Castillo; 27 Mel Hall; 20 Otis Nixon; 24 George Vukovich; Other batters: 29 Andre Thornton	Manager: 18 Pat Corrales; Coaches: 25 Bobby Bonds (Hitting); 45 John Goryl (Third Base); 47 Don McMahon (Pitching); 1 Ed Napoleon (First Base); 6 Dennis Sommers (Bullpen)

== Player stats ==
=== Batting ===
Note: G = Games played; AB = At bats; R = Runs scored; H = Hits; 2B = Doubles; 3B = Triples; HR = Home runs; RBI = Runs batted in; AVG = Batting average; SB = Stolen bases

Player	G	AB	R	H	2B	3B	HR	RBI	AVG	SB
Benny Ayala	46	76	10	19	7	0	2	15	.250	0
Chris Bando	73	173	11	24	4	1	0	13	.139	0
Butch Benton	31	67	5	12	4	0	0	7	.179	0
Tony Bernazard	153	500	73	137	26	3	11	59	.274	17
Brett Butler	152	591	106	184	28	14	5	50	.311	47
Joe Carter	143	489	64	128	27	0	15	59	.262	24
Carmen Castillo	67	184	27	45	5	1	11	25	.245	3
Mike Fischlin	73	60	12	12	4	1	0	2	.200	0
Julio Franco	160	636	97	183	33	4	6	90	.288	13
Mel Hall	23	66	7	21	6	0	0	12	.318	0
Mike Hargrove	107	284	31	81	14	1	1	27	.285	1
Brook Jacoby	161	606	72	166	26	3	20	87	.274	2
Johnnie LeMaster	11	20	0	3	0	0	0	2	.150	0
Otis Nixon	104	162	34	38	4	0	3	9	.235	20
Pat Tabler	117	404	47	111	18	3	5	59	.275	0
Andre Thornton	124	461	49	109	13	0	22	88	.236	3
George Vukovich	149	434	43	106	22	0	8	45	.244	2
Jerry Willard	104	300	39	81	13	0	7	36	.270	0
Jim Wilson	4	14	2	5	0	0	0	4	.357	0
Team totals	162	5527	729	1465	254	31	116	689	.265	132

=== Pitching ===
Note: W = Wins; L = Losses; ERA = Earned run average; G = Games pitched; GS = Games started; SV = Saves; IP = Innings pitched; H = Hits allowed; R = Runs allowed; ER = Earned runs allowed; BB = Walks allowed; K = Strikeouts

Player	W	L	ERA	G	GS	SV	IP	H	R	ER	BB	K
Jeff Barkley	0	3	5.27	21	0	1	41.0	37	26	24	15	30
Rick Behenna	0	2	7.78	4	4	0	19.2	29	17	17	8	4
Bert Blyleven	9	11	3.26	23	23	0	179.2	163	76	65	49	129
Ernie Camacho	0	1	8.10	2	0	0	3.1	4	3	3	1	2
Bryan Clark	3	4	6.32	31	3	2	62.2	78	47	44	34	24
Keith Creel	2	5	4.79	15	8	0	62.0	73	35	33	23	31
Jamie Easterly	4	1	3.92	50	7	0	98.2	96	52	43	53	58
Neal Heaton	9	17	4.90	36	33	0	207.2	244	119	113	80	82
Mike Jeffcoat	0	0	2.79	9	0	0	9.2	8	5	3	6	4
Jerry Reed	3	5	4.11	33	5	8	72.1	67	41	33	19	37
Jose Roman	0	4	6.61	5	3	0	16.1	13	17	12	14	12
Ramon Romero	2	3	6.58	19	10	0	64.1	69	48	47	38	38
Vern Ruhle	2	10	4.32	42	16	3	125.0	139	65	60	30	54
Don Schulze	4	10	6.01	19	18	0	94.1	128	75	63	19	37
Roy Smith	1	4	5.34	12	11	0	62.1	84	40	37	17	28
Rich Thompson	3	8	6.30	57	0	5	80.0	95	63	56	48	30
Dave Von Ohlen	3	2	2.91	26	0	0	43.1	47	20	14	20	12
Tom Waddell	8	6	4.87	49	9	9	112.2	104	61	61	39	53
Curt Wardle	7	6	6.68	15	12	0	66.0	78	51	49	34	37
Team totals	60	102	4.91	162	162	28	1421.0	1556	861	776	547	702

== Awards and honors ==
All-Star Game

== Farm system ==
Level	Team	League	Manager
AAA	Maine Guides	International League	Doc Edwards
AA	Waterbury Indians	Eastern League	Jack Aker
A	Waterloo Indians	Midwest League	Steve Swisher
A-Short Season	Batavia Trojans	New York–Penn League	Eddie Bane
