= 1985 Major League Baseball strike =

Two-day work stoppage

The 1985 Major League Baseball strike was the fifth work stoppage in Major League Baseball since the 1972 Major League Baseball strike. The strike lasted only two days, August 6 and 7. Of the 25 games scheduled for those days, 23 were made up later in the season with the only two games not being made up being a game between the Baltimore Orioles and Toronto Blue Jays at Exhibition Stadium and a game between the Milwaukee Brewers and Texas Rangers at Arlington Stadium which were both scheduled to be played on August 7.

== See also ==
- 1985 Major League Baseball season
