= 1985 California Angels season =

Major League Baseball season

1985 California Angels
- League: American League
- Division: West
- Ballpark: Anaheim Stadium
- City: Anaheim, California
- Record: 90–72 (.556)
- Divisional place: 2nd
- Owner: Gene Autry
- General manager: Mike Port
- Manager: Gene Mauch
- Television: KTLA (Joe Torre, Bob Starr); SelecTV USA
- Radio: KMPC (Ron Fairly, Dick Enberg, Al Conin); KLVE (Cookie Rojas, Ulpiano Cos Villa)
- Stats: ESPN.com; Baseball Reference

The 1985 California Angels season was the 25th season of the California Angels franchise in the American League, the 20th in Anaheim, and their 20th season playing their home games at Anaheim Stadium. The Angels finished second in the American League West with a 90–72 record, finishing one game behind the eventual World Series champions, the Kansas City Royals.

== Offseason ==
- November 7, 1984: Ellis Valentine was released by the Angels.
- January 11, 1985: Rob Picciolo was released by the California Angels.
- January 30, 1985: Ruppert Jones was signed as a free agent with the California Angels.
- March 31, 1985: Bill Mooneyham was released by the Angels.

== Regular season ==
- October 6, 1985: Rufino Linares hit a home run in the last at-bat of his career.

=== Season standings ===
AL West
Team	W	L	Pct.	GB	Home	Road
Kansas City Royals	91	71	.562	—	50‍–‍32	41‍–‍39
California Angels	90	72	.556	1	49‍–‍30	41‍–‍42
Chicago White Sox	85	77	.525	6	45‍–‍36	40‍–‍41
Minnesota Twins	77	85	.475	14	49‍–‍35	28‍–‍50
Oakland Athletics	77	85	.475	14	43‍–‍36	34‍–‍49
Seattle Mariners	74	88	.457	17	42‍–‍41	32‍–‍47
Texas Rangers	62	99	.385	28½	37‍–‍43	25‍–‍56

=== Record vs. opponents ===
1985 American League record Sources:
Team	BAL	BOS	CAL	CWS	CLE	DET	KC	MIL	MIN	NYY	OAK	SEA	TEX	TOR
Baltimore	—	5–8	7–5	8–4	8–5	6–7	6–6	9–4	6–6	1–12	7–5	6–6	10–2	4–8
Boston	8–5	—	5–7	4–8–1	8–5	6–7	5–7	5–8	7–5	5–8	8–4	6–6	5–7	9–4
California	5–7	7–5	—	8–5	8–4	8–4	4–9	9–3	9–4	3–9	6–7	9–4	9–4	5–7
Chicago	4–8	8–4–1	5–8	—	10–2	6–6	5–8	5–7	6–7	6–6	8–5	9–4	10–3	3–9
Cleveland	5–8	5–8	4–8	2–10	—	5–8	2–10	7–6	4–8	6–7	3–9	6–6	7–5	4–9
Detroit	7–6	7–6	4–8	6–6	8–5	—	5–7	9–4	3–9	9–3	8–4	5–7	7–5	6–7
Kansas City	6–6	7–5	9–4	8–5	10–2	7–5	—	8–4	7–6	5–7	8–5	3–10	6–7	7–5
Milwaukee	4–9	8–5	3–9	7–5	6–7	4–9	4–8	—	9–3	7–6	3–9	4–8	8–3	4–9
Minnesota	6–6	5–7	4–9	7–6	8–4	9–3	6–7	3–9	—	3–9	8–5	6–7	8–5	4–8
New York	12–1	8–5	9–3	6–6	7–6	3–9	7–5	6–7	9–3	—	7–5	9–3	8–4	6–7
Oakland	5–7	4–8	7–6	5–8	9–3	4–8	5–8	9–3	5–8	5–7	—	8–5	6–7	5–7
Seattle	6–6	6–6	4–9	4–9	6–6	7–5	10–3	8–4	7–6	3–9	5–8	—	6–7	2–10
Texas	2–10	7–5	4–9	3–10	5–7	5–7	7–6	3–8	5–8	4–8	7–6	7–6	—	3–9
Toronto	8–4	4–9	7–5	9–3	9–4	7–6	5–7	9–4	8–4	7–6	7–5	10–2	9–3	—

=== Notable transactions ===
- June 3, 1985: Bo Jackson was drafted by the Angels in the 20th round of the 1985 amateur draft, but did not sign.
- June 19, 1985: Tommy John was released by the Angels.
- August 2, 1985: Pat Clements, Mike Brown and a player to be named later were traded by the Angels to the Pittsburgh Pirates for John Candelaria, George Hendrick and Al Holland. The Angels completed the deal by sending Bob Kipper to the Pirates on August 16.
- September 10, 1985: The Angels traded players to be named later to the Oakland Athletics for Don Sutton. The Angels completed the deal by sending Robert Sharpnack (minors) and Jerome Nelson (minors) to the Athletics on September 25.

=== Roster ===
1985 California Angels
Roster
Pitchers: 45 John Candelaria; 27 Pat Clements; 33 Stew Cliburn; 23 Doug Corbett; 46 Alan Fowlkes; 19 Al Holland; 25 Tommy John; 36 Bob Kipper; 18 Urbano Lugo; 17 Tony Mack; 15 Kirk McCaskill; 37 Donnie Moore; 10 Ron Romanick; 40 Luis Sánchez; 41 Jim Slaton; 35 Dave Smith; 27 Don Sutton; 39 Mike Witt; 38 Geoff Zahn	Catchers: 8 Bob Boone; 34 Jerry Narron; Infielders: 29 Rod Carew; 11 Doug DeCinces; 2 Craig Gerber; 4 Bobby Grich; 16 Jack Howell; 36 Pat Keedy; 56 Gus Polidor; 22 Dick Schofield; 9 Rob Wilfong	Outfielders: 12 Juan Beníquez; 21 Mike Brown; 5 Brian Downing; 25 George Hendrick; 44 Reggie Jackson; 13 Ruppert Jones; 32 Darrell Miller; 20 Gary Pettis; 30 Devon White; Other batters: 24 Rufino Linares; 6 Daryl Sconiers	Manager: 3 Gene Mauch; Coaches: 49 Bob Clear; 1 Bobby Knoop; 51 Marcel Lachemann; 50 Jimmie Reese; 47 Moose Stubing

== Game log ==
=== Regular season ===
1985 regular season game log: 90–72 (Home: 49–30; Away: 41–42)
April: 14–7 (Home: 6–5; Away: 8–2)

#	Date	Time (PT)	Opponent	Score	Win	Loss	Save	Time of Game	Attendance	Record	Box/ Streak

May: 12–13 (Home: 8–7; Away: 4–6)

#	Date	Time (PT)	Opponent	Score	Win	Loss	Save	Time of Game	Attendance	Record	Box/ Streak
22	May 1	7:30 p.m. PDT	Blue Jays	L 3–6	Key (1–2)	**McCaskill** (0–1)	–	2:34	24,112	14–8	L1
23	May 2	7:30 p.m. PDT	Blue Jays	**W** 3–2	**Clements** (2–0)	Stieb (1–3)	–	2:45	23,824	15–8	W1
32	May 14	4:35 p.m. PDT	@ Blue Jays	L 3–6	Alexander (5–1)	**Slaton** (3–2)	Caudill (7)	2:42	22,445	19–13	L2
33	May 15	4:35 p.m. PDT	@ Blue Jays	**W** 9–6	**Moore** (2–1)	Caudill (4–3)	–	3:00	18,119	20–13	LW1
34	May 17	7:30 p.m. PDT	Yankees	L 0–6	Niekro (5–2)	**Witt** (2–4)	–	2:40	61,066	20–14	L1
35	May 18	12:20 p.m. PDT	Yankees	L 1–6	Cowley (2–2)	**John** (2–3)	Fisher (1)	2:48	32,936	20–15	L2
36	May 19	1:00 p.m. PDT	Yankees	**W** 4–1	**Slaton** (4–2)	Whitson (1–5)	**Moore** (9)	2:29	39,724	21–15	W1
37	May 20		Tigers								
38	May 21		Tigers								
39	May 22		Tigers								
44	May 29	5:00 p.m. PDT	@ Yankees	L 2–7	Niekro (6–3)	**Slaton** (4–3)	–	2:30	25,049	25–19	L2
45	May 30	5:00 p.m. PDT	@ Yankees	L 1–3	Cowley (4–2)	**Romanick** (6–2)	Righetti (10)	2:09	17,226	25–20	L3
46	May 31		@ Tigers								

June: 15–12 (Home: 7–6; Away: 8–6)

#	Date	Time (PT)	Opponent	Score	Win	Loss	Save	Time of Game	Attendance	Record	Box/ Streak
47	June 1		@ Tigers								
48	June 2		@ Tigers								
52	June 7	7:30 p.m. PDT	Royals	L 0–6	Saberhagen (6–3)	**Witt** (3–6)	–	2:26	29,414	28–24	L2
53	June 8	7:00 p.m. PDT	Royals	L 1–4	Gubicza (2–4)	**Slaton** (4–4)	Quisenberry (11)	2:19	46,393	28–25	L3
54	June 9	1:00 p.m. PDT	Royals	**W** 1–0	**Romanick** (7–2)	Jackson (4–3)	**Moore** (12)	2:04	41,973	29–25	W1
58	June 13		White Sox								
59	June 14		White Sox								
60	June 15		White Sox								
61	June 16		White Sox								
65	June 21		@ White Sox								
66	June 22		@ White Sox								
67	June 23		@ White Sox								
71	June 28	5:35 p.m. PDT	@ Royals	L 4–5 (14)	Quisenberry (4–4)	**Corbett** (2–1)	–	4:50	32,651	40–31	L1
72	June 29	5:35 p.m. PDT	@ Royals	**W** 7–1	**Lugo** (3–1)	Black (5–8)	–	2:46	39,451	41–31	W1
73	June 30	11:35 a.m. PDT	@ Royals	L 1–3	Gubicza (6–4)	**Romanick** (8–4)	Quisenberry (14)	2:23	33,173	41–32	L1

July: 16–11 (Home: 9–2; Away: 7–9)

#	Date	Time (PT)	Opponent	Score	Win	Loss	Save	Time of Game	Attendance	Record	Box/ Streak
84	July 11	7:30 p.m. PDT	Blue Jays	L 3–5	Alexander (8–6)	**Slaton** (4–8)	Lavelle (4)	2:49	31,672	49–35	L1
85	July 12	7:30 p.m. PDT	Blue Jays	**W** 5–3	**McCaskill** (5–5)	Key (7–4)	**Moore** (17)	2:43	35,870	50–35	W1
86	July 13	7:00 p.m. PDT	Blue Jays	**W** 4–3	**Witt** (7–6)	Lavelle (3–3)	–	2:55	42,054	51–35	W2
87	July 14	1:00 p.m. PDT	Blue Jays	**W** 5–3	**Cliburn** (4–2)	Lavelle (3–4)	–	2:53	35,306	52–35	W3
**56th All-Star Game in Minneapolis, MN**
95	July 25	4:35 p.m. PDT	@ Blue Jays	L 0–7	Stieb (10–6)	**Witt** (8–7)	–	2:28	32,083	56–39	L1
96	July 26	4:35 p.m. PDT	@ Blue Jays	L 3–8	Clancy (7–4)	**Lugo** (3–3)	–	2:36	31,294	56–40	L2
97	July 27	10:35 a.m. PDT	@ Blue Jays	L 3–8	Filer (2–0)	**Mack** (0–1)	Acker (10)	2:38	44,116	56–41	L3
98	July 28	10:35 a.m. PDT	@ Blue Jays	L 1–5	Alexander (10–6)	**McCaskill** (6–7)	–	2:28	36,190	56–42	L4

August: 16–13 (Home: 11–5; Away: 5–8)

#	Date	Time (PT)	Opponent	Score	Win	Loss	Save	Time of Game	Attendance	Record	Box/ Streak
119	August 20	7:30 p.m. PDT	Yankees	L 5–8	Bordi (4–4)	**Slaton** (5–10)	Righetti (23)	3:04	38,791	68–51	L1
120	August 21	7:30 p.m. PDT	Yankees	L 10–13 (10)	Righetti (10–7)	**Moore** (7–7)	–	4:01	40,363	68–52	L2
121	August 22	7:30 p.m. PDT	Yankees	**W** 3–2	**Witt** (11–7)	Bordi (4–5)	–	3:23	44,796	69–52	W1
122	August 23		Tigers								
123	August 24		Tigers								
124	August 25		Tigers								
127	August 29	5:00 p.m. PDT	@ Yankees	L 0–4	Niekro (13–9)	**McCaskill** (9–9)	–	2:43	32,169	72–55	L1
128	August 30	5:00 p.m. PDT	@ Yankees	**W** 4–1	**Candelaria** (3–1)	Bystrom (3–2)	**Moore** (24)	3:09	22,256	73–55	W1
129	August 31	10:20 a.m. PDT	@ Yankees	L 4–10	Righetti (11–7)	**Corbett** (2–2)	–	3:04	26,991	73–56	L1

September: 14–13 (Home: 8–5; Away: 6–8)

#	Date	Time (PT)	Opponent	Score	Win	Loss	Save	Time of Game	Attendance	Record	Box/ Streak
130	September 1	11:00 a.m. EDT	@ Yankees	L 3–5	Shirley (4–4)	**Holland** (0–1)	Fisher (10)	3:06	33,080	73–57	L2
131	September 2		@ Tigers								
132	September 3		@ Tigers								
133	September 4		@ Tigers								
137	September 9	7:30 p.m. PDT	Royals	**W** 7–1	**Candelaria** (5–1)	Saberhagen (17–6)	–	1:57	29,688	77–60	W2
138	September 10	7:30 p.m. PDT	Royals	L 0–6	Leibrandt (15–7)	**McCaskill** (9–11)	–	2:12	37,813	77–61	L1
139	September 11	7:30 p.m. PDT	Royals	L 1–2	Jackson (13–9)	**Romanick** (13–8)	Quisenberry (33)	2:41	32,906	77–62	L2
144	September 17		@ White Sox								
145	September 18		@ White Sox								
146	September 19		@ White Sox								
150	September 23		White Sox								
151	September 24		White Sox								
152	September 25		White Sox								
156	September 30	5:35 p.m. PDT	@ Royals	L 1–3	Saberhagen (20–6)	**Candelaria** (6–3)	–	2:09	34,200	87–69	L1

October: 3–3 (Home: 0–0; Away: 3–3)

#	Date	Time (ET)	Opponent	Score	Win	Loss	Save	Time of Game	Attendance	Record	Box/ Streak
157	October 1	5:35 p.m. PDT	@ Royals	**W** 4–2	**Witt** (14–9)	Leibrandt (17–9)	**Moore** (30)	2:36	26,273	88–69	W1
158	October 2	5:35 p.m. PDT	@ Royals	L 0–4	Black (10–15)	**Romanick** (14–9)	–	2:08	28,401	88–70	L1
159	October 3	5:35 p.m. PDT	@ Royals	L 1–4	Jackson (14–12)	**Sutton** (15–10)	Quisenberry (36)	2:24	40,894	88–71	L2

Legend: = Win = Loss = Postponement
Bold = Angels team member

== Player stats ==
=== Batting ===
==== Starters by position ====
Note: Pos = Position; G = Games played; AB = At bats; H = Hits; Avg. = Batting average; HR = Home runs; RBI = Runs batted in

Pos	Player	G	AB	H	Avg.	HR	RBI
C	Bob Boone	150	460	114	.248	5	55
1B	Rod Carew	127	443	124	.280	2	39
2B	Bobby Grich	144	479	116	.242	13	53
SS	Dick Schofield	147	438	96	.219	8	41
3B	Doug DeCinces	120	427	104	.244	20	78
LF	Brian Downing	150	520	137	.263	20	85
CF	Gary Pettis	125	443	114	.257	1	32
RF	Reggie Jackson	143	460	116	.252	27	85
DH	Ruppert Jones	125	389	90	.231	21	67

==== Other batters ====
Note: G = Games played; AB = At bats; H = Hits; Avg. = Batting average; HR = Home runs; RBI = Runs batted in

Player	G	AB	H	Avg.	HR	RBI
Juan Beníquez	132	411	125	.304	8	42
Rob Wilfong	83	217	41	.189	4	13
Mike Brown	60	153	41	.268	4	20
Jack Howell	43	137	27	.197	5	18
Jerry Narron	67	132	29	.220	5	14
Daryl Sconiers	44	98	28	.286	2	12
Craig Stuart Gerber	65	91	24	.264	0	6
Darrell Miller	51	48	18	.375	2	7
Rufino Linares	18	43	11	.256	3	11
George Hendrick	16	41	5	.122	2	6
Devon White	21	7	1	.143	0	0
Pat Keedy	3	4	2	.500	1	1
Gus Polidor	2	1	1	1.000	0	0

=== Pitching ===
==== Starting pitchers ====
Note: G = Games pitched; IP = Innings pitched; W = Wins; L = Losses; ERA = Earned run average; SO = Strikeouts

Player	G	IP	W	L	ERA	SO
Mike Witt	35	250.0	15	9	3.56	180
Ron Romanick	31	195.0	14	9	4.11	64
Kirk McCaskill	30	189.2	12	12	4.70	102
Jim Slaton	29	148.1	6	10	4.37	60
John Candelaria	13	71.0	7	3	3.80	53
Geoff Zahn	7	37.0	2	2	4.38	14
Don Sutton	5	31.2	2	2	3.69	16
Tony Mack	1	2.1	0	1	15.43	0

==== Other pitchers ====
Note: G = Games pitched; IP = Innings pitched; W = Wins; L = Losses; ERA = Earned run average; SO = Strikeouts

Player	G	IP	W	L	ERA	SO
Urbano Lugo	20	83.0	3	4	3.69	42
Tommy John	12	38.1	2	4	4.70	17
Bob Kipper	2	3.1	0	1	21.60	0

==== Relief pitchers ====
Note: G = Games pitched; W = Wins; L = Losses; SV = Saves; ERA = Earned run average; SO = Strikeouts

Player	G	W	L	SV	ERA	SO
Donnie Moore	65	8	8	31	1.92	72
Stew Cliburn	44	9	3	6	2.09	48
Pat Clements	41	5	0	1	3.34	19
Doug Corbett	30	3	3	0	4.89	24
Luis Sánchez	26	2	0	2	5.72	34
Al Holland	15	0	1	0	1.48	14
Dave Smith	4	0	0	0	7.20	3
Alan Fowlkes	2	0	0	0	9.00	5

== Farm system ==
Level	Team	League	Manager
AAA	Edmonton Trappers	Pacific Coast League	Winston Llenas
AA	Midland Angels	Texas League	Joe Maddon
A	Redwood Pioneers	California League	Tom Kotchman
A	Quad Cities Angels	Midwest League	Bill Lachemann
A-Short Season	Salem Angels	Northwest League	Bruce Hines

Records
Preceded by 1984	California Angels seasons 1985	Succeeded by 1986
