= 1985 Chicago White Sox season =

1985 Chicago White Sox
- League: American League
- Division: West
- Ballpark: Comiskey Park
- City: Chicago
- Owners: Jerry Reinsdorf
- General managers: Roland Hemond
- Managers: Tony La Russa
- Television: WFLD; Sportsvision; ONTV (Don Drysdale, Ken Harrelson)
- Radio: WMAQ (AM) (Del Crandall, Lorn Brown)

The 1985 Chicago White Sox season was the White Sox's 86th season. They finished with a record of 85–77, good enough for third place in the American League West, 6 games behind the first place Kansas City Royals.

== Offseason ==
- October 19, 1984: Guy Hoffman was released by the White Sox.
- October 19, 1984: Casey Parsons was released by the White Sox.
- December 7, 1984: Bert Roberge was traded by the White Sox to the Montreal Expos for Bryan Little.
- January 12, 1985: Steve Fireovid was signed as a free agent by the White Sox.
- January 14, 1985: Dave Wehrmeister was signed as a free agent by the White Sox.
- March 23, 1985: Oscar Gamble was signed as a free agent by the Chicago White Sox.

== Regular season ==
- September 22, 1985: José Canseco became the 27th player to hit a home run over the roof of Comiskey Park.

=== 1985 Opening Day lineup ===
- Ozzie Guillén, SS
- Rudy Law, LF
- Harold Baines, RF
- Greg Walker, 1B
- Ron Kittle, DH
- Luis Salazar, 3B
- Daryl Boston, CF
- Marc Hill, C
- Julio Cruz, 2B
- Tom Seaver, P

=== Standings ===
AL West
Team	W	L	Pct.	GB	Home	Road
Kansas City Royals	91	71	.562	—	50‍–‍32	41‍–‍39
California Angels	90	72	.556	1	49‍–‍30	41‍–‍42
Chicago White Sox	85	77	.525	6	45‍–‍36	40‍–‍41
Minnesota Twins	77	85	.475	14	49‍–‍35	28‍–‍50
Oakland Athletics	77	85	.475	14	43‍–‍36	34‍–‍49
Seattle Mariners	74	88	.457	17	42‍–‍41	32‍–‍47
Texas Rangers	62	99	.385	28½	37‍–‍43	25‍–‍56

=== Record vs. opponents ===
1985 American League record Sources:
Team	BAL	BOS	CAL	CWS	CLE	DET	KC	MIL	MIN	NYY	OAK	SEA	TEX	TOR
Baltimore	—	5–8	7–5	8–4	8–5	6–7	6–6	9–4	6–6	1–12	7–5	6–6	10–2	4–8
Boston	8–5	—	5–7	4–8–1	8–5	6–7	5–7	5–8	7–5	5–8	8–4	6–6	5–7	9–4
California	5–7	7–5	—	8–5	8–4	8–4	4–9	9–3	9–4	3–9	6–7	9–4	9–4	5–7
Chicago	4–8	8–4–1	5–8	—	10–2	6–6	5–8	5–7	6–7	6–6	8–5	9–4	10–3	3–9
Cleveland	5–8	5–8	4–8	2–10	—	5–8	2–10	7–6	4–8	6–7	3–9	6–6	7–5	4–9
Detroit	7–6	7–6	4–8	6–6	8–5	—	5–7	9–4	3–9	9–3	8–4	5–7	7–5	6–7
Kansas City	6–6	7–5	9–4	8–5	10–2	7–5	—	8–4	7–6	5–7	8–5	3–10	6–7	7–5
Milwaukee	4–9	8–5	3–9	7–5	6–7	4–9	4–8	—	9–3	7–6	3–9	4–8	8–3	4–9
Minnesota	6–6	5–7	4–9	7–6	8–4	9–3	6–7	3–9	—	3–9	8–5	6–7	8–5	4–8
New York	12–1	8–5	9–3	6–6	7–6	3–9	7–5	6–7	9–3	—	7–5	9–3	8–4	6–7
Oakland	5–7	4–8	7–6	5–8	9–3	4–8	5–8	9–3	5–8	5–7	—	8–5	6–7	5–7
Seattle	6–6	6–6	4–9	4–9	6–6	7–5	10–3	8–4	7–6	3–9	5–8	—	6–7	2–10
Texas	2–10	7–5	4–9	3–10	5–7	5–7	7–6	3–8	5–8	4–8	7–6	7–6	—	3–9
Toronto	8–4	4–9	7–5	9–3	9–4	7–6	5–7	9–4	8–4	7–6	7–5	10–2	9–3	—

=== Notable transactions ===
- April 1, 1985: Jerry Dybzinski was released by the Chicago White Sox.
- June 3, 1985: 1985 Major League Baseball draft
  - The Chicago White Sox drafted catcher Kurt Brown with the fifth overall pick in the 1985 Draft.
  - Bobby Thigpen was drafted by the White Sox in the 4th round.
  - Tom Drees was drafted by the White Sox in the 17th round.
  - Randy Velarde was drafted by the White Sox in the 19th round. Player signed June 14, 1985.
- June 26, 1985: Mike Stanton was signed as a free agent by the White Sox.
- July 17, 1985: Bob Owchinko was purchased by the Chicago White Sox from the Oakland Athletics.
- August 12, 1985: Oscar Gamble was released by the White Sox.
- August 12, 1985: Mike Stanton was released by the White Sox.
- September 24, 1985: Bob Owchinko was released by the Chicago White Sox.

=== Roster ===
1985 Chicago White Sox
Roster
Pitchers: 50 Juan Agosto; 24 Floyd Bannister; 40 Britt Burns; 56 Ed Correa; 52 Joel Davis; 34 Richard Dotson; 27 Bob Fallon; 45 Steve Fireovid; 43 Jerry Don Gleaton; 43 Bob James; 49 Al Jones; 46 Tim Lollar; 36 Bill Long; 30 Gene Nelson; 41 Tom Seaver; 37 Dan Spillner; 48 Mike Stanton; 31 Bruce Tanner; 51 Dave Wehrmeister	Catchers: 72 Carlton Fisk; 7 Marc Hill; 22 Joel Skinner; Infielders: 16 Julio Cruz; 20,38 Joe DeSa; 1 Scott Fletcher; 13 Ozzie Guillén; 32 Tim Hulett; 47 Bryan Little; 29 Greg Walker	Outfielders: 3 Harold Baines; 8 Daryl Boston; 33 John Cangelosi; 44 Mark Gilbert; 42 Ron Kittle; 23 Rudy Law; 20 Reid Nichols; 44 Tom Paciorek; 26 Mark Ryal; 31,5 Luis Salazar; Other batters: 0 Oscar Gamble; 17 Jerry Hairston; 25 Mike Squires	Manager: 10 Tony La Russa; Coaches: 35 Ed Brinkman; 18 Dave Duncan (Pitching); 15 Art Kusnyer; 21 Jim Leyland (Third base); 14 Joe Nossek

== Game log ==
=== Regular season ===
Legend
	White Sox win
	White Sox loss
	White Sox tie
	Postponement
	Eliminated from playoff race
**Bold**	White Sox team member

1985 regular season game log: 85–77–1 (Home: 45–36; Away: 40–41–1)
April: 9–8 (Home: 6–3; Away: 3–5)

#	Date	Time (CT)	Opponent	Score	Win	Loss	Save	Time of Game	Attendance	Record	Box/ Streak

May: 13–13 (Home: 10–4; Away: 3–9)

#	Date	Time (CT)	Opponent	Score	Win	Loss	Save	Time of Game	Attendance	Record	Box/ Streak

June: 13–14 (Home: 4–7; Away: 9–7)

#	Date	Time (CT)	Opponent	Score	Win	Loss	Save	Time of Game	Attendance	Record	Box/ Streak

July: 14–12–1 (Home: 7–7; Away: 7–5–1)

#	Date	Time (CT)	Opponent	Score	Win	Loss	Save	Time of Game	Attendance	Record	Box/ Streak
—	July 16	7:40 p.m. CDT	**56th All-Star Game in Minneapolis, MN**								

August: 14–17 (Home: 9–10; Away: 5–7)

#	Date	Time (CT)	Opponent	Score	Win	Loss	Save	Time of Game	Attendance	Record	Box/ Streak

September: 18–11 (Home: 6–4; Away: 12–7)

#	Date	Time (CT)	Opponent	Score	Win	Loss	Save	Time of Game	Attendance	Record	Box/ Streak

October: 4–2 (Home: 3–1; Away: 1–1)

#	Date	Time (CT)	Opponent	Score	Win	Loss	Save	Time of Game	Attendance	Record	Box/ Streak

== Player stats ==
= Indicates team leader

= Indicates league leader

=== Batting ===
Note: G = Games played; AB = At bats; R = Runs scored; H = Hits; 2B = Doubles; 3B = Triples; HR = Home runs; RBI = Runs batted in; BB = Base on balls; SO = Strikeouts; AVG = Batting average; SB = Stolen bases

Player	G	AB	R	H	2B	3B	HR	RBI	BB	SO	AVG	SB
Harold Baines, RF	160	640	86	198	29	3	22	113	42	89	.309	1
Daryl Boston, CF	95	232	20	53	13	1	3	15	14	44	.228	8
John Cangelosi, OF	5	2	2	0	0	0	0	0	0	1	.000	0
Julio Cruz, 2B	91	234	28	46	2	3	0	15	32	40	.197	8
Joe DeSa, 1B, DH	28	44	5	8	2	0	2	7	3	6	.182	0
Carlton Fisk, C, DH	153	543	85	129	23	1	37	107	52	81	.238	17
Scott Fletcher, 3B, SS, 2B	119	301	38	77	8	1	2	31	35	47	.256	5
Oscar Gamble, DH	70	148	20	30	5	0	4	20	34	22	.203	0
Mark Gilbert, OF	7	22	3	6	1	0	0	3	4	5	.273	0
Ozzie Guillén, SS	150	491	71	134	21	9	1	33	12	36	.273	7
Jerry Hairston, DH, LF	95	140	9	34	8	0	2	20	29	18	.243	0
Marc Hill, C	40	75	5	10	2	0	0	4	12	9	.133	0
Tim Hulett, 3B, 2B	141	395	52	106	19	4	5	37	30	81	.268	6
Ron Kittle, DH, LF	116	379	51	87	12	0	26	58	31	92	.230	1
Rudy Law, LF, CF	125	390	62	101	21	6	4	36	27	40	.259	29
Bryan Little, 2B	73	188	35	47	9	1	2	27	26	21	.250	0
Gene Nelson, P	1	1	0	0	0	0	0	0	0	0	.000	0
Reid Nichols, OF	51	118	20	35	7	1	1	15	15	13	.297	5
Tom Paciorek, OF, DH, 1B	46	122	14	30	2	0	0	9	8	22	.246	2
Mark Ryal, OF	12	33	4	5	3	0	0	3	3	3	.152	0
Luis Salazar, OF, 3B, DH, 1B	122	327	39	80	18	2	10	45	12	60	.245	14
Joel Skinner, C	22	44	9	15	4	1	1	5	5	13	.341	0
Dan Spillner, P	1	0	0	0	0	0	0	0	1	0	.000	0
Mike Squires, PR	2	0	1	0	0	0	0	0	0	0	.000	0
Greg Walker, 1B, DH	163	601	77	155	38	4	24	92	44	100	.258	5
Team totals	163	5470	736	1386	247	37	146	695	471	843	.253	108

=== Pitching ===
Note: W = Wins; L = Losses; ERA = Earned run average; G = Games pitched; GS = Games started; SV = Saves; IP = Innings pitched; H = Hits allowed; R = Runs allowed; ER = Earned runs allowed; HR = Home runs allowed; BB = Walks allowed; K = Strikeouts

Player	W	L	ERA	G	GS	SV	IP	H	R	ER	HR	BB	K
Juan Agosto	4	3	3.58	54	0	1	60.1	45	27	24	3	24	39
Floyd Bannister	10	14	4.87	34	34	0	210.2	211	121	114	30	105	198
Britt Burns	18	11	3.96	36	34	0	227.0	206	105	100	26	80	172
Ed Correa	1	0	6.97	5	1	0	10.1	11	9	8	2	11	10
Joel Davis	3	3	4.16	12	11	0	71.1	71	34	33	6	26	37
Richard Dotson	3	4	4.47	9	9	0	52.1	53	30	26	5	18	33
Bob Fallon	0	0	6.19	10	0	0	16.0	25	11	11	5	11	17
Steve Fireovid	0	0	5.14	4	0	0	7.0	17	4	4	0	2	2
Jerry Don Gleaton	1	0	5.76	31	0	1	29.2	37	19	19	3	16	22
Bob James	8	7	2.13	69	0	32	110.0	90	31	26	5	27	88
Al Jones	1	0	1.50	5	0	0	6.0	3	2	1	0	3	2
Tim Lollar	3	5	4.66	18	13	0	83.0	83	48	43	10	59	61
Bill Long	0	1	10.29	4	3	0	14.0	25	17	16	4	7	13
Gene Nelson	10	10	4.26	46	18	2	145.2	144	74	69	23	71	101
Tom Seaver	16	11	3.17	35	33	0	238.2	223	103	84	22	75	134
Dan Spillner	4	3	3.44	52	3	1	91.2	83	39	35	10	35	41
Mike Stanton	0	1	9.26	11	0	0	11.2	15	14	12	2	8	12
Bruce Tanner	1	2	5.33	10	4	0	27.0	34	17	16	1	16	9
Dave Wehrmeister	2	2	3.43	23	0	2	39.1	35	15	15	4	10	32
Team totals	85	77	4.07	163	163	39	1451.2	1411	720	656	161	604	1023

== Farm system ==
Level	Team	League	Manager
AAA	Buffalo Bisons	American Association	John Boles
AA	Glens Falls White Sox	Eastern League	Steve Dillard
A	Appleton Foxes	Midwest League	Sal Rende
A-Short Season	Niagara Falls White Sox	New York–Penn League	Luis Lagunas
Rookie	GCL White Sox	Gulf Coast League	J. C. Martin
