= 1985 Seattle Mariners season =

1985 Seattle Mariners
- League: American League
- Division: West
- Ballpark: Kingdome
- City: Seattle, Washington
- Record: 74–88 (.457)
- Divisional place: 6th
- Owner: George Argyros
- General manager: Hal Keller
- Manager: Chuck Cottier
- Television: KSTW-TV 11
- Radio: KIRO 710 AM (Dave Niehaus, Rick Rizzs, Nelson Briles)

The 1985 Seattle Mariners season was their ninth since the franchise creation. They finished sixth in the American League West with a record of 74–88 (.457). Chuck Cottier, who managed the team in the final month of the 1984 season, managed the team for the entire year and had his contract renewed, before being fired in May 1986.

Outfielder Phil Bradley was the team's sole All-Star Game selection. Gorman Thomas won the Comeback Player of the Year Award. Thomas hit 32 home runs, a franchise record that stood until Ken Griffey Jr. hit 40 home runs in 1993.

Pitchers Bill Swift, Brian Snyder, and Bill Wilkinson made their MLB debuts for the 1985 Mariners.

== Regular season ==
- July 9: Against the Toronto Blue Jays at the Kingdome in Seattle, Jays catcher Buck Martinez executed a double play by tagging out two runners at home plate. In the third inning, Phil Bradley was on second when Gorman Thomas singled. Bradley was tagged out at home, on a throw from Jesse Barfield to Martinez with a collision in which Martinez broke his ankle; he was sitting on the ground in agony and threw the ball to third base in an attempt to tag out Thomas. The throw went into left field and Thomas continued running; left fielder George Bell threw the ball back to Martinez, still seated on the ground in pain, who tagged Thomas out.

=== Season standings ===
AL West
Team	W	L	Pct.	GB	Home	Road
Kansas City Royals	91	71	.562	—	50‍–‍32	41‍–‍39
California Angels	90	72	.556	1	49‍–‍30	41‍–‍42
Chicago White Sox	85	77	.525	6	45‍–‍36	40‍–‍41
Minnesota Twins	77	85	.475	14	49‍–‍35	28‍–‍50
Oakland Athletics	77	85	.475	14	43‍–‍36	34‍–‍49
Seattle Mariners	74	88	.457	17	42‍–‍41	32‍–‍47
Texas Rangers	62	99	.385	28½	37‍–‍43	25‍–‍56

=== Record vs. opponents ===
1985 American League record Sources:
Team	BAL	BOS	CAL	CWS	CLE	DET	KC	MIL	MIN	NYY	OAK	SEA	TEX	TOR
Baltimore	—	5–8	7–5	8–4	8–5	6–7	6–6	9–4	6–6	1–12	7–5	6–6	10–2	4–8
Boston	8–5	—	5–7	4–8–1	8–5	6–7	5–7	5–8	7–5	5–8	8–4	6–6	5–7	9–4
California	5–7	7–5	—	8–5	8–4	8–4	4–9	9–3	9–4	3–9	6–7	9–4	9–4	5–7
Chicago	4–8	8–4–1	5–8	—	10–2	6–6	5–8	5–7	6–7	6–6	8–5	9–4	10–3	3–9
Cleveland	5–8	5–8	4–8	2–10	—	5–8	2–10	7–6	4–8	6–7	3–9	6–6	7–5	4–9
Detroit	7–6	7–6	4–8	6–6	8–5	—	5–7	9–4	3–9	9–3	8–4	5–7	7–5	6–7
Kansas City	6–6	7–5	9–4	8–5	10–2	7–5	—	8–4	7–6	5–7	8–5	3–10	6–7	7–5
Milwaukee	4–9	8–5	3–9	7–5	6–7	4–9	4–8	—	9–3	7–6	3–9	4–8	8–3	4–9
Minnesota	6–6	5–7	4–9	7–6	8–4	9–3	6–7	3–9	—	3–9	8–5	6–7	8–5	4–8
New York	12–1	8–5	9–3	6–6	7–6	3–9	7–5	6–7	9–3	—	7–5	9–3	8–4	6–7
Oakland	5–7	4–8	7–6	5–8	9–3	4–8	5–8	9–3	5–8	5–7	—	8–5	6–7	5–7
Seattle	6–6	6–6	4–9	4–9	6–6	7–5	10–3	8–4	7–6	3–9	5–8	—	6–7	2–10
Texas	2–10	7–5	4–9	3–10	5–7	5–7	7–6	3–8	5–8	4–8	7–6	7–6	—	3–9
Toronto	8–4	4–9	7–5	9–3	9–4	7–6	5–7	9–4	8–4	7–6	7–5	10–2	9–3	—

=== Notable transactions ===
- June 3, 1985: Mike Schooler was drafted by the Mariners in the second round of the 1985 Major League Baseball draft.
- June 20: Mike Stanton was released by the Mariners.

=== Roster ===
1985 Seattle Mariners
Roster
Pitchers: 38 Salomé Barojas; 45 Jim Beattie; 39 Karl Best; 37 Dave Geisel; 12 Mark Langston; 46 Jack Lazorko; 34 Jim Lewis; 55 Bob Long; 52 Paul Mirabella; 25 Mike Moore; 35 Mike Morgan; 30 Edwin Núñez; 33 Brian Snyder; 46 Mike Stanton; 18 Bill Swift; 49 Roy Thomas; 41 Dave Tobik; 32 Ed Vande Berg; 51 Bill Wilkinson; 43 Frank Wills; 40 Matt Young	Catchers: 11 Bob Kearney; 2 Donnie Scott; 5 Dave Valle; Infielders: 19 Darnell Coles; 21 Alvin Davis; 7 Spike Owen; 14 Jack Perconte; 17 Jim Presley; 3 Domingo Ramos; 24 Harold Reynolds; 38 Danny Tartabull	Outfielders: 9 Barry Bonnell; 29 Phil Bradley; 13,22 Iván Calderón; 16 Al Cowens; 42 Dave Henderson; 26 John Moses; 10 Ricky Nelson; Other batters: 23 Al Chambers; 44 Ken Phelps; 20 Gorman Thomas	Manager: 15 Chuck Cottier; Coaches: 8 Deron Johnson; 6 Jim Mahoney; 43 Marty Martínez; 27 Phil Regan; 4 Phil Roof

== Player stats ==
= Indicates team leader

=== Batting ===
==== Starters by position ====
Note: Pos = Position; G = Games played; AB = At bats; H = Hits; Avg. = Batting average; HR = Home runs; RBI = Runs batted in

Pos	Player	G	AB	H	Avg.	HR	RBI
C	Bob Kearney	108	305	74	.243	6	27
1B	Alvin Davis	155	578	166	.287	18	78
2B	Jack Perconte	125	485	128	.264	2	23
SS	Spike Owen	118	352	91	.259	6	37
3B	Jim Presley	155	570	157	.275	28	84
LF	Phil Bradley	159	641	192	.300	26	88
CF	Dave Henderson	139	502	121	.241	14	68
RF	Al Cowens	122	452	120	.265	14	69
DH	Gorman Thomas	135	484	104	.215	32	87

==== Other batters ====
Note: G = Games played; AB = At bats; H = Hits; Avg. = Batting average; HR = Home runs; RBI = Runs batted in

Player	G	AB	H	Avg.	HR	RBI
Iván Calderón	67	210	60	.286	8	28
Donnie Scott	80	185	41	.222	4	23
Domingo Ramos	75	168	33	.196	1	15
Ken Phelps	61	116	24	.207	9	24
Barry Bonnell	48	111	27	.243	1	10
Harold Reynolds	67	104	15	.144	0	6
Dave Valle	31	70	11	.157	0	4
John Moses	33	62	12	.194	0	3
Danny Tartabull	19	61	20	.328	1	7
Darnell Coles	27	59	14	.237	1	5
Al Chambers	4	4	0	.000	0	0
Ricky Nelson	6	2	0	.000	0	0

=== Pitching ===
= Indicates league leader

==== Starting pitchers ====
Note: G = Games pitched; IP = Innings pitched; W = Wins; L = Losses; ERA = Earned run average; SO = Strikeouts

Player	G	IP	W	L	ERA	SO
Mike Moore	35	247.0	17	10	3.46	155
Matt Young	37	218.1	12	19	4.91	136
Mark Langston	24	126.2	7	14	5.47	72
Frank Wills	24	123.0	5	11	6.00	67
Bill Swift	23	120.2	6	10	4.77	55
Jim Beattie	18	70.1	5	6	7.29	45
Mike Morgan	2	6.0	1	1	12.00	2
Bill Wilkinson	2	6.0	0	2	13.50	5

==== Other pitchers ====
Note: G = Games pitched; IP = Innings pitched; W = Wins; L = Losses; ERA = Earned run average; SO = Strikeouts

Player	G	IP	W	L	ERA	SO
Salomé Barojas	17	52.2	0	5	5.98	27
Brian Snyder	15	35.1	1	2	6.37	23
Jim Lewis	2	4.2	0	1	7.71	1

==== Relief pitchers ====
Note: G = Games pitched; W = Wins; L = Losses; SV = Saves; ERA = Earned run average; SO = Strikeouts

Player	G	W	L	SV	ERA	SO
Edwin Núñez	70	7	3	16	3.09	58
Ed Vande Berg	76	2	1	3	3.72	34
Roy Thomas	40	7	0	1	3.36	70
Bob Long	28	0	0	0	3.76	29
Mike Stanton	24	1	2	1	5.28	17
Karl Best	15	2	1	4	1.95	32
Jack Lazorko	15	0	0	1	3.54	7
Dave Geisel	12	0	0	0	6.33	17
Paul Mirabella	10	0	0	0	1.32	8
Dave Tobik	8	1	0	1	6.00	8

== Farm system ==
Level	Team	League	Manager
AAA	Calgary Cannons	Pacific Coast League	Bobby Floyd
AA	Chattanooga Lookouts	Southern League	Bill Plummer
A	Salinas Spurs	California League	R. J. Harrison
A	Wausau Timbers	Midwest League	Greg Mahlberg
A-Short Season	Bellingham Mariners	Northwest League	Gary Pellant
