= 1985 Baltimore Orioles season =

Major League Baseball season

1985 Baltimore Orioles
- League: American League
- Division: East
- Ballpark: Memorial Stadium
- City: Baltimore
- Record: 83–78 (.516)
- Divisional place: 4th
- Owners: Edward Bennett Williams
- General managers: Hank Peters
- Managers: Joe Altobelli, Cal Ripken, Sr., Earl Weaver
- Television: WMAR-TV (Chuck Thompson, Brooks Robinson); Home Team Sports (Rex Barney, Mel Proctor, Jim Palmer, Larry King)
- Radio: WFBR (Jon Miller, Tom Marr)

The 1985 Baltimore Orioles season was the 85th season in Baltimore Orioles franchise history, the 32nd in Baltimore, and the 32nd at Memorial Stadium. The Orioles finished fourth in the American League East with a record of 83 wins and 78 losses. The Orioles led Major League Baseball in home runs (214) and slugging percentage (.430).

== Offseason ==
- October 2, 1984: Tom Underwood was released by the Baltimore Orioles.
- December 13, 1984: Don Aase was signed as a free agent by the Orioles.
- December 17, 1984: Ron Jackson was released by the Orioles.
- January 3, 1985: Mike Blowers was drafted by the Orioles in the 4th round of the 1985 Major League Baseball draft (secondary phase), but did not sign.
- February 7, 1985: Vic Rodriguez was traded by the Orioles to the San Diego Padres for Fritzie Connally.
- March 27, 1985: Mark Brown was traded by the Orioles to the Minnesota Twins for Brad Havens.
- March 29, 1985: Todd Cruz was released by the Orioles.

== Regular season ==
Jim
Palmer
P
Retired 1985

=== Season standings ===
AL East
Team	W	L	Pct.	GB	Home	Road
Toronto Blue Jays	99	62	.615	—	54‍–‍26	45‍–‍36
New York Yankees	97	64	.602	2	58‍–‍22	39‍–‍42
Detroit Tigers	84	77	.522	15	44‍–‍37	40‍–‍40
Baltimore Orioles	83	78	.516	16	45‍–‍36	38‍–‍42
Boston Red Sox	81	81	.500	18½	43‍–‍37	38‍–‍44
Milwaukee Brewers	71	90	.441	28	40‍–‍40	31‍–‍50
Cleveland Indians	60	102	.370	39½	38‍–‍43	22‍–‍59

=== Record vs. opponents ===
1985 American League record Sources:
Team	BAL	BOS	CAL	CWS	CLE	DET	KC	MIL	MIN	NYY	OAK	SEA	TEX	TOR
Baltimore	—	5–8	7–5	8–4	8–5	6–7	6–6	9–4	6–6	1–12	7–5	6–6	10–2	4–8
Boston	8–5	—	5–7	4–8–1	8–5	6–7	5–7	5–8	7–5	5–8	8–4	6–6	5–7	9–4
California	5–7	7–5	—	8–5	8–4	8–4	4–9	9–3	9–4	3–9	6–7	9–4	9–4	5–7
Chicago	4–8	8–4–1	5–8	—	10–2	6–6	5–8	5–7	6–7	6–6	8–5	9–4	10–3	3–9
Cleveland	5–8	5–8	4–8	2–10	—	5–8	2–10	7–6	4–8	6–7	3–9	6–6	7–5	4–9
Detroit	7–6	7–6	4–8	6–6	8–5	—	5–7	9–4	3–9	9–3	8–4	5–7	7–5	6–7
Kansas City	6–6	7–5	9–4	8–5	10–2	7–5	—	8–4	7–6	5–7	8–5	3–10	6–7	7–5
Milwaukee	4–9	8–5	3–9	7–5	6–7	4–9	4–8	—	9–3	7–6	3–9	4–8	8–3	4–9
Minnesota	6–6	5–7	4–9	7–6	8–4	9–3	6–7	3–9	—	3–9	8–5	6–7	8–5	4–8
New York	12–1	8–5	9–3	6–6	7–6	3–9	7–5	6–7	9–3	—	7–5	9–3	8–4	6–7
Oakland	5–7	4–8	7–6	5–8	9–3	4–8	5–8	9–3	5–8	5–7	—	8–5	6–7	5–7
Seattle	6–6	6–6	4–9	4–9	6–6	7–5	10–3	8–4	7–6	3–9	5–8	—	6–7	2–10
Texas	2–10	7–5	4–9	3–10	5–7	5–7	7–6	3–8	5–8	4–8	7–6	7–6	—	3–9
Toronto	8–4	4–9	7–5	9–3	9–4	7–6	5–7	9–4	8–4	7–6	7–5	10–2	9–3	—

=== Opening Day starters ===
- Rich Dauer
- Storm Davis
- Rick Dempsey
- Wayne Gross
- John Lowenstein
- Fred Lynn
- Eddie Murray
- Cal Ripken Jr.
- Larry Sheets
- Mike Young

=== Notable transactions ===
- June 3, 1985: Rico Rossy was drafted by the Orioles in the 33rd round of the 1985 Major League Baseball draft. Player signed June 6, 1985.

== Roster ==
1985 Baltimore Orioles roster
Roster
Pitchers: 41 Don Aase; 47 Eric Bell; 52 Mike Boddicker; 34 Storm Davis; 39 Ken Dixon; 46 Mike Flanagan; 54 John Habyan; 31 Brad Havens; 21,48 Phil Huffman; 30 Dennis Martínez; 23 Tippy Martinez; 16 Scott McGregor; 36 Nate Snell; 53 Sammy Stewart; 32 Bill Swaggerty	Catchers: 24 Rick Dempsey; 17 Joe Nolan; 26 Al Pardo; Infielders: 11 Fritzie Connally; 25 Rich Dauer; 14 Wayne Gross; 3 Leo Hernández; 33 Eddie Murray; 17 Tom O'Malley; 21 Kelly Paris; 6 Floyd Rayford; 8 Cal Ripken Jr.; 12 Lenn Sakata; 2 Alan Wiggins	Outfielders: 9 Jim Dwyer; 27 Lee Lacy; 38 John Lowenstein; 19 Fred Lynn; 35 Gary Roenicke; 37 John Shelby; 43 Mike Young; Other batters: 15 Dan Ford; 18 Larry Sheets	Manager: 26 Joe Altobelli; 4 Earl Weaver; Coaches: 48 Terry Crowley (Hitting); 44 Elrod Hendricks (Bullpen); 31 Ray Miller (Pitching); 47 Cal Ripken, Sr. (Third base); 20 Frank Robinson (Bench); 40 Jimmy Williams (First base)

== Player stats ==
=== Batting ===
==== Starters by position ====
Note: Pos = Position; G = Games played; AB = At bats; H = Hits; Avg. = Batting average; HR = Home runs; RBI = Runs batted in

Pos	Player	G	AB	H	Avg.	HR	RBI
C	Rick Dempsey	132	362	92	.254	12	52
1B	Eddie Murray	156	583	173	.297	31	124
2B	Alan Wiggins	76	298	85	.285	0	21
3B	Floyd Rayford	105	359	110	.306	18	48
SS	Cal Ripken Jr.	161	642	181	.282	26	110
LF	Mike Young	139	450	123	.273	28	81
CF	Fred Lynn	124	448	118	.263	23	68
RF	Lee Lacy	121	492	144	.293	9	48
DH	Larry Sheets	113	328	86	.262	17	50

==== Other batters ====
Note: G = Games played; AB = At bats; H = Hits; Avg. = Batting average; HR = Home runs; RBI = Runs batted in

Player	G	AB	H	Avg.	HR	RBI
Jim Dwyer	101	233	58	.249	7	36
Gary Roenicke	114	225	49	.218	15	43
Wayne Gross	103	217	51	.235	11	18
Rich Dauer	85	208	42	.202	2	14
John Shelby	69	205	58	.283	7	27
Fritzie Connally	50	112	26	.232	3	15
Lenn Sakata	55	97	22	.227	3	6
Dan Ford	28	75	14	.187	1	1
Al Pardo	34	75	10	.133	0	1
Joe Nolan	31	38	5	.132	0	6
John Lowenstein	12	26	2	.077	0	2
Leo Hernández	12	21	1	.048	0	0
Tom O'Malley	8	14	1	.071	1	2
Kelly Paris	5	9	0	.000	0	0

=== Pitching ===
==== Starting pitchers ====
Note: G = Games pitched; IP = Innings pitched; W = Wins; L = Losses; ERA = Earned run average; SO = Strikeouts

Player	G	IP	W	L	ERA	SO
Scott McGregor	35	204.0	14	14	4.81	86
Mike Boddicker	32	203.1	12	17	4.07	135
Dennis Martínez	33	180.0	13	11	5.15	68
Storm Davis	31	175.0	10	8	4.53	93
Mike Flanagan	15	86.0	4	5	5.13	42

==== Other pitchers ====
Note: G = Games pitched; IP = Innings pitched; W = Wins; L = Losses; ERA = Earned run average; SO = Strikeouts

Player	G	IP	W	L	ERA	SO
Ken Dixon	34	162.0	8	4	3.67	108
Brad Havens	8	14.1	0	1	8.79	19
Phil Huffman	2	4.2	0	0	15.43	2

==== Relief pitchers ====
Note: G = Games pitched; W = Wins; L = Losses; SV = Saves; ERA = Earned run average; SO = Strikeouts

Player	G	W	L	SV	ERA	SO
Don Aase	54	10	6	14	3.78	67
Sammy Stewart	56	5	7	9	3.61	77
Tippy Martinez	49	3	3	4	5.40	47
Nate Snell	43	3	2	5	2.69	41
Eric Bell	4	0	0	0	4.76	4
John Habyan	2	1	0	0	0.00	2
Bill Swaggerty	1	0	0	0	5.40	2

== Farm system ==
Level	Team	League	Manager
AAA	Rochester Red Wings	International League	Frank Verdi and Mark Wiley
AA	Charlotte O's	Southern League	John Hart
A	Hagerstown Suns	Carolina League	Greg Biagini
A	Daytona Beach Islanders	Florida State League	Jim Hutto
A-Short Season	Newark Orioles	New York–Penn League	Art Mazmanian
Rookie	Bluefield Orioles	Appalachian League	Mike Verdi

Daytona Beach affiliation shared with Texas Rangers
