= 1985 Detroit Tigers season =

Major League Baseball season

1985 Detroit Tigers
- League: American League
- Division: East
- Ballpark: Tiger Stadium
- City: Detroit
- Record: 84–77 (.522)
- Divisional place: 3rd
- Owners: Tom Monaghan
- General managers: Bill Lajoie
- Managers: Sparky Anderson
- Television: WDIV-TV (George Kell, Al Kaline); PASS (Bill Freehan, Larry Osterman, Jim Northrup)
- Radio: WJR (Ernie Harwell, Paul Carey)

The 1985 Detroit Tigers season was the team's 85th season and the 74th season at Tiger Stadium. The Tigers entered the season as the reigning World Series champions. The 1985 Detroit Tigers finished in third place in the American League East with a record of 84–77 (.522), 15 games behind the Blue Jays. The Tigers outscored their opponents 729 to 688. The Tigers drew 2,286,609 fans to Tiger Stadium in 1985, ranking 3rd of the 14 teams in the American League.

== Regular season ==
=== Season standings ===
AL East
Team	W	L	Pct.	GB	Home	Road
Toronto Blue Jays	99	62	.615	—	54‍–‍26	45‍–‍36
New York Yankees	97	64	.602	2	58‍–‍22	39‍–‍42
Detroit Tigers	84	77	.522	15	44‍–‍37	40‍–‍40
Baltimore Orioles	83	78	.516	16	45‍–‍36	38‍–‍42
Boston Red Sox	81	81	.500	18½	43‍–‍37	38‍–‍44
Milwaukee Brewers	71	90	.441	28	40‍–‍40	31‍–‍50
Cleveland Indians	60	102	.370	39½	38‍–‍43	22‍–‍59

=== Record vs. opponents ===
1985 American League record Sources:
Team	BAL	BOS	CAL	CWS	CLE	DET	KC	MIL	MIN	NYY	OAK	SEA	TEX	TOR
Baltimore	—	5–8	7–5	8–4	8–5	6–7	6–6	9–4	6–6	1–12	7–5	6–6	10–2	4–8
Boston	8–5	—	5–7	4–8–1	8–5	6–7	5–7	5–8	7–5	5–8	8–4	6–6	5–7	9–4
California	5–7	7–5	—	8–5	8–4	8–4	4–9	9–3	9–4	3–9	6–7	9–4	9–4	5–7
Chicago	4–8	8–4–1	5–8	—	10–2	6–6	5–8	5–7	6–7	6–6	8–5	9–4	10–3	3–9
Cleveland	5–8	5–8	4–8	2–10	—	5–8	2–10	7–6	4–8	6–7	3–9	6–6	7–5	4–9
Detroit	7–6	7–6	4–8	6–6	8–5	—	5–7	9–4	3–9	9–3	8–4	5–7	7–5	6–7
Kansas City	6–6	7–5	9–4	8–5	10–2	7–5	—	8–4	7–6	5–7	8–5	3–10	6–7	7–5
Milwaukee	4–9	8–5	3–9	7–5	6–7	4–9	4–8	—	9–3	7–6	3–9	4–8	8–3	4–9
Minnesota	6–6	5–7	4–9	7–6	8–4	9–3	6–7	3–9	—	3–9	8–5	6–7	8–5	4–8
New York	12–1	8–5	9–3	6–6	7–6	3–9	7–5	6–7	9–3	—	7–5	9–3	8–4	6–7
Oakland	5–7	4–8	7–6	5–8	9–3	4–8	5–8	9–3	5–8	5–7	—	8–5	6–7	5–7
Seattle	6–6	6–6	4–9	4–9	6–6	7–5	10–3	8–4	7–6	3–9	5–8	—	6–7	2–10
Texas	2–10	7–5	4–9	3–10	5–7	5–7	7–6	3–8	5–8	4–8	7–6	7–6	—	3–9
Toronto	8–4	4–9	7–5	9–3	9–4	7–6	5–7	9–4	8–4	7–6	7–5	10–2	9–3	—

=== Notable transactions ===
- April 5, 1985: Roger Mason was traded by the Detroit Tigers to the San Francisco Giants for Alejandro Sánchez.
- June 3, 1985: 1985 Major League Baseball draft
  - Scott Lusader was drafted by the Tigers in the 6th round.
  - Mark Lee was drafted by the Tigers in the 15th round.
  - Andy Stankiewicz was drafted by the Tigers in the 18th round, but did not sign.
  - John Smoltz was drafted by the Tigers in the 22nd round. Player signed September 22, 1985.

=== Roster ===
1985 Detroit Tigers
Roster
Pitchers: 40 Doug Bair; 44 Juan Berenguer; 43 Chuck Cary; 21 Willie Hernández; 29 Aurelio López; 42 Mickey Mahler; 47 Jack Morris; 49 Randy O'Neal; 46 Dan Petry; 17 Bill Scherrer; 48 Bob Stoddard; 26 Frank Tanana; 35 Walt Terrell; 39 Milt Wilcox	Catchers: 8 Marty Castillo; 19 Scotti Madison; 18 Bob Melvin; 13 Lance Parrish; Infielders: 9 Doug Baker; 14 Dave Bergman; 16 Tom Brookens; 41 Darrell Evans; 20 Doug Flynn; 27 Bárbaro Garbey; 15 Rusty Kuntz; 4 Mike Laga; 12 Chris Pittaro; 3 Alan Trammell; 1 Lou Whitaker	Outfielders: 23 Kirk Gibson; 31 Larry Herndon; 34 Chet Lemon; 32 Alejandro Sánchez; 37 Nelson Simmons; 20 Jim Weaver; Other batters: 30 Johnny Grubb	Manager: 11 Sparky Anderson; Coaches: 50 Billy Consolo; 51 Alex Grammas; 56 Billy Muffett; 28 Vada Pinson; 53 Dick Tracewski

== Player stats ==
= Indicates team leader

= Indicates league leader

=== Batting ===
==== Starters by position ====
Note: Pos = Position; G = Games played; AB = At bats; H = Hits; Avg. = Batting average; HR = Home runs; RBI = Runs Batted In

Pos	Player	G	AB	H	Avg.	HR	RBI
C	Lance Parrish	140	549	150	.273	28	98
1B	Darrell Evans	151	505	125	.248	40	94
2B	Lou Whitaker	152	609	170	.279	21	73
3B	Tom Brookens	156	485	115	.237	7	47
SS	Alan Trammell	149	605	156	.258	13	57
RF	Kirk Gibson	154	581	167	.287	29	97
CF	Chet Lemon	145	517	137	.265	18	68
LF	Larry Herndon	137	442	108	.244	12	37
DH	Johnny Grubb	78	155	38	.245	5	25

==== Other batters ====
Note: G = Games played; AB = At bats; H = Hits; Avg. = Batting average; HR = Home runs; RBI = Runs Batted In

Player	G	AB	H	Avg.	HR	RBI
Nelson Simmons	75	251	60	.239	10	33
Bárbaro Garbey	86	237	61	.257	6	29
Dave Bergman	69	140	25	.179	3	7
Alejandro Sánchez	71	133	33	.248	6	12
Marty Castillo	57	84	10	.119	2	5
Bob Melvin	41	82	18	.220	0	4
Chris Pittaro	28	62	15	.242	0	7
Doug Flynn	32	51	13	.255	0	2
Mike Laga	9	36	6	.167	2	6
Doug Baker	15	27	5	.185	0	1
Scotti Madison	6	11	0	.000	0	1
Jim Weaver	12	7	1	.143	0	0
Rusty Kuntz	5	5	0	.000	0	0

=== Pitching ===
==== Starting pitchers ====
Note: G = Games; IP = Innings pitched; W = Wins; L = Losses; ERA = Earned run average; SO = Strikeouts

Player	G	IP	W	L	ERA	SO
Jack Morris	35	257.0	16	11	3.33	191
Dan Petry	34	238.2	15	13	3.36	109
Walt Terrell	34	229.0	15	10	3.85	130
Frank Tanana	20	137.1	10	7	3.34	107
Milt Wilcox	8	39.0	1	3	4.85	20

==== Other pitchers ====
Note: G = Games pitched; IP = Innings pitched; W = Wins; L = Losses; ERA = Earned run average; SO = Strikeouts

Player	G	IP	W	L	ERA	SO
Juan Berenguer	31	95.0	5	6	5.59	82
Randy O'Neal	28	94.1	5	5	3.24	52
Mickey Mahler	3	20.2	1	2	1.74	14

==== Relief pitchers ====
Note: G = Games pitched; W= Wins; L= Losses; SV = Saves; GF = Games Finished; ERA = Earned run average; SO = Strikeouts

Player	G	W	L	SV	GF	ERA	SO
Willie Hernández	74	8	10	31	64	2.70	76
Aurelio López	51	3	7	5	22	4.80	53
Bill Scherrer	48	3	2	0	14	4.36	46
Doug Bair	21	2	0	0	4	6.24	30
Chuck Cary	16	0	1	2	6	3.42	22
Bob Stoddard	8	0	0	1	3	6.75	11

== Players ranking among top 100 all time at position ==
The following members of the 1985 Detroit Tigers are among the Top 100 of all time at their position, as ranked by The Bill James Historical Baseball Abstract:

- Lance Parrish: 19th best catcher of all time
- Lou Whitaker: 13th best second baseman of all time
- Darrell Evans: 10th best third baseman of all time
- Alan Trammell: 9th best shortstop of all time
- Kirk Gibson: 36th best left fielder of all time
- Chet Lemon: 48th best center fielder of all time

== Award winners and league leaders ==
Tom Brookens

- AL leader in errors by a third baseman (23)
- #9 in AL in doubles (34)

Darrell Evans

- Tiger of the Year Award, by Detroit baseball writers
- MLB leader in home runs (40)
- MLB leader in at bats per home run (12.6)
- Finished 14th in AL MVP voting
- #4 in AL in intentional walks (12)
- #5 in AL in slugging percentage (.519)
- #7 in AL in bases on balls (85)
- #8 in AL in OPS (.875)

Kirk Gibson

- AL leader in errors by an outfielder (11)
- Finished 18th in AL MVP voting
- #2 in AL in Power/Speed Number (29.5)
- #2 in AL in intentional walks (16)
- #3 in AL in extra base hits (71)
- #4 in AL in sacrifice flies (10)
- #4 in AL in strikeouts (137)
- #6 in AL in slugging percentage (.518)
- #6 in AL in total bases (301)
- #6 in AL in runs created (118)
- #7 in AL in OPS (.882)
- #7 in AL in doubles (37)
- #8 in AL in strikeouts (30)
- #9 in AL in home runs (29)
- #10 in MLB in total bases (301)
- #10 in MLB in doubles (37)
- #10 in MLB in runs created (118)

Willie Hernández

- AL All Star Team, pitcher
- #2 in MLB in games finished (64)
- #3 in AL in saves (31)
- #3 in AL in games (74)

Chet Lemon

- #5 in AL in times hit by pitch (10)

Jack Morris

- AL All Star Team, starting pitcher
- AL leader in wild pitches (15)
- #2 in AL in shutouts (4)
- #2 in AL in bases on balls allowed (110)
- #3 in AL in strikeouts (191)
- #4 in AL in hits allowed per 9 innings pitched (7.42)
- #4 in AL in strikeouts per 9 innings pitched (6.69)
- #5 in AL in complete games (13)
- #10 in MLB in batters faced (1077)

Lance Parrish

- AL Gold Glove Award, catcher
- AL All Star Team, catcher

Dan Petry

- AL All Star Team, pitcher
- #3 in AL in hits allowed per 9 innings (7.16)
- #5 in AL in walks plus hits per inning pitched (WHIP) (1.135)

Frank Tanana

- #3 in AL in strikeout to walk ratio (2.79)
- #5 in AL in strikeouts per 9 innings pitched (6.66)

Walt Terrell

- #4 in AL in shutouts (3)

Alan Trammell

- AL All Star Team, shortstop
- #7 in AL in sacrifice hits (11)
- #8 in AL in outs (480)
- #9 in AL in sacrifice flies (9)

Lou Whitaker

- AL Gold Glove Award, second base
- AL Silver Slugger Award, second base
- AL All Star Team, starting second baseman
- #7 in AL in triples (8)
- #9 in AL in plate appearances (701)
- #9 in AL in runs created (107)
- #9 in AL in times on base (252)
- #10 in AL in runs (102)

== Farm system ==
Level	Team	League	Manager
AAA	Nashville Sounds	American Association	Lee Walls, Leon Roberts, and Gordon Mackenzie
AA	Birmingham Barons	Southern League	Gordon Mackenzie, Mark DeJohn, Frank Franchi, and Jerry Grote
A	Lakeland Tigers	Florida State League	Jerry Grote and Moby Benedict
Rookie	Bristol Tigers	Appalachian League	Tom Burgess

LEAGUE CHAMPIONS: Bristol
