= Anthony Mack =

Anthony Mack may refer to:

- Robert A. McGowan (1901–1955), film writer and director, usually credited as "Anthony Mack"
- Anthony Mack (boxer); see Eliseo Castillo
- Tony Mack, baseball player
- Tony Mac (Tony McDonnell), footballer
