= 1985 Texas Rangers season =

1985 Texas Rangers
- League: American League
- Division: West
- Ballpark: Arlington Stadium
- City: Arlington, Texas
- Record: 62-99 (.385)
- Divisional place: 7th
- Owners: Eddie Chiles
- General managers: Tom Grieve
- Managers: Doug Rader, Bobby Valentine
- Television: KTVT (Freddie Patek, Phil Stone); HSE (Steve Busby, Merle Harmon)
- Radio: WBAP (Eric Nadel, Mark Holtz )

The Texas Rangers 1985 season was the 14th for the franchise in the Dallas-Fort Worth metroplex, and the 25th overall. The Rangers finished seventh in the American League West with a record of 62 wins and 99 losses, 28½ games behind the eventual AL and World Series Champion Kansas City Royals.

== Offseason ==
- November 7, 1984: Dave Hostetler was traded by the Rangers to the Montreal Expos for Chris Welsh.
- November 26, 1984: Marv Foley was released by the Rangers.
- January 3, 1985: Rafael Bournigal was drafted by the Rangers in the 11th round of the 1985 Major League Baseball draft, but did not sign.
- January 18, 1985: Danny Darwin and a player to be named later were traded by the Rangers to the Milwaukee Brewers as part of a 4-team trade. The Kansas City Royals sent Don Slaught to the Rangers. The Brewers sent Jim Sundberg to the Royals. The New York Mets sent Tim Leary to the Brewers. The Royals sent Frank Wills to the Mets. The Rangers completed the deal by sending Bill Nance (minors) to the Brewers on January 30.
- February 13, 1985: Greg A. Harris was purchased by the Texas Rangers from the San Diego Padres.
- February 27, 1985: Billy Sample and a player to be named later were traded by the Rangers to the New York Yankees for Toby Harrah. The Rangers completed the deal by sending Eric Dersin (minors) to the Yankees on July 14.

== Regular season ==
- April 29, 1985 – Larry Parrish hit three home runs in a game against the New York Yankees.
- Charlie Hough finished second in the American League with 14 complete games.

=== Notable transactions ===
- April 6, 1985: Randy Asadoor was traded by the Rangers to the San Diego Padres for Mitch Williams.
- April 6, 1985: Daryl Smith was released by the Rangers.
- May 17, 1985: Geno Petralli was signed as a free agent by the Rangers.
- July 10, 1985: Ellis Valentine was signed as a free agent by the Rangers.
- July 30, 1985: Sammy Sosa was signed by the Rangers as an amateur free agent.
- August 28, 1985: The Rangers traded Cliff Johnson to the Toronto Blue Jays for players to be named later. The Blue Jays completed the deal by sending Matt Williams and Jeff Mays (minors) to the Rangers on August 29, and Greg Ferlenda (minors) to the Rangers on November 14.
- September 13, 1985: Dave Stewart was traded by the Rangers to the Philadelphia Phillies for Rick Surhoff.

=== Opening Day starters ===
- Buddy Bell
- Toby Harrah
- Cliff Johnson
- Pete O'Brien
- Larry Parrish
- Don Slaught
- Frank Tanana
- Gary Ward
- Curtis Wilkerson
- George Wright

=== Season standings ===
AL West
Team	W	L	Pct.	GB	Home	Road
Kansas City Royals	91	71	.562	—	50‍–‍32	41‍–‍39
California Angels	90	72	.556	1	49‍–‍30	41‍–‍42
Chicago White Sox	85	77	.525	6	45‍–‍36	40‍–‍41
Minnesota Twins	77	85	.475	14	49‍–‍35	28‍–‍50
Oakland Athletics	77	85	.475	14	43‍–‍36	34‍–‍49
Seattle Mariners	74	88	.457	17	42‍–‍41	32‍–‍47
Texas Rangers	62	99	.385	28½	37‍–‍43	25‍–‍56

=== Record vs. opponents ===
1985 American League record Sources:
Team	BAL	BOS	CAL	CWS	CLE	DET	KC	MIL	MIN	NYY	OAK	SEA	TEX	TOR
Baltimore	—	5–8	7–5	8–4	8–5	6–7	6–6	9–4	6–6	1–12	7–5	6–6	10–2	4–8
Boston	8–5	—	5–7	4–8–1	8–5	6–7	5–7	5–8	7–5	5–8	8–4	6–6	5–7	9–4
California	5–7	7–5	—	8–5	8–4	8–4	4–9	9–3	9–4	3–9	6–7	9–4	9–4	5–7
Chicago	4–8	8–4–1	5–8	—	10–2	6–6	5–8	5–7	6–7	6–6	8–5	9–4	10–3	3–9
Cleveland	5–8	5–8	4–8	2–10	—	5–8	2–10	7–6	4–8	6–7	3–9	6–6	7–5	4–9
Detroit	7–6	7–6	4–8	6–6	8–5	—	5–7	9–4	3–9	9–3	8–4	5–7	7–5	6–7
Kansas City	6–6	7–5	9–4	8–5	10–2	7–5	—	8–4	7–6	5–7	8–5	3–10	6–7	7–5
Milwaukee	4–9	8–5	3–9	7–5	6–7	4–9	4–8	—	9–3	7–6	3–9	4–8	8–3	4–9
Minnesota	6–6	5–7	4–9	7–6	8–4	9–3	6–7	3–9	—	3–9	8–5	6–7	8–5	4–8
New York	12–1	8–5	9–3	6–6	7–6	3–9	7–5	6–7	9–3	—	7–5	9–3	8–4	6–7
Oakland	5–7	4–8	7–6	5–8	9–3	4–8	5–8	9–3	5–8	5–7	—	8–5	6–7	5–7
Seattle	6–6	6–6	4–9	4–9	6–6	7–5	10–3	8–4	7–6	3–9	5–8	—	6–7	2–10
Texas	2–10	7–5	4–9	3–10	5–7	5–7	7–6	3–8	5–8	4–8	7–6	7–6	—	3–9
Toronto	8–4	4–9	7–5	9–3	9–4	7–6	5–7	9–4	8–4	7–6	7–5	10–2	9–3	—

=== Roster ===
1985 Texas Rangers roster
Roster
Pitchers: 40 Tommy Boggs; 33 Glen Cook; 23 José Guzmán; 27 Greg Harris; 45 Dwayne Henry; 46 Burt Hooton; 49 Charlie Hough; 16 Mike Mason; 31 Dale Murray; 36 Dickie Noles; 30 Dave Rozema; 40 Jeff Russell; 24 Dave Schmidt; 28 Bob Sebra; 48 Dave Stewart; 44 Rich Surhoff; 28 Frank Tanana; 41 Chris Welsh; 29 Matt Williams; 38 Ricky Wright	Catchers: 7 Glenn Brummer; 12 Geno Petralli; 8 Luis Pujols; 4 Don Slaught; Infielders: 25 Buddy Bell; 22 Steve Buechele; 11 Toby Harrah; 20 Jeff Kunkel; 9 Pete O'Brien; 1 Bill Stein; 3 Wayne Tolleson; 19 Curtis Wilkerson	Outfielders: 39 Nick Capra; 6 Bob Jones; 0 Oddibe McDowell; 15 Larry Parrish; 17 Ellis Valentine; 21,59 Duane Walker; 32 Gary Ward; 26 George Wright; Other batters: 2,5 Alan Bannister; 13 Tom Dunbar; 44 Cliff Johnson	Manager: 5 Doug Rader; 2 Bobby Valentine; Coaches: 37 Rich Donnelly; 18 Glenn Ezell; 22 Merv Rettenmund; 52 Dick Such; 42 Wayne Terwilliger

== Player stats ==
=== Batting ===
==== Starters by position ====
Note: Pos = Position; G = Games played; AB = At bats; H = Hits; Avg. = Batting average; HR = Home runs; RBI = Runs batted in

Pos	Player	G	AB	H	Avg.	HR	RBI
C	Don Slaught	102	343	96	.280	8	35
1B	Pete O'Brien	159	573	153	.267	22	92
2B	Toby Harrah	126	396	107	.270	9	44
SS	Curt Wilkerson	129	360	88	.244	0	22
3B	Buddy Bell	84	313	74	.236	4	32
LF	Gary Ward	154	593	170	.287	15	70
CF	Oddibe McDowell	111	406	97	.239	18	42
RF	Larry Parrish	94	346	86	.249	17	51
DH	Cliff Johnson	82	296	76	.257	12	56

==== Other batters ====
Note: G = Games played; AB = At bats; H = Hits; Avg. = Batting average; HR = Home runs; RBI = Runs batted in

Player	G	AB	H	Avg.	HR	RBI
George Wright	109	363	69	.190	2	18
Wayne Tolleson	123	323	101	.313	1	18
Steve Buechele	69	219	48	.219	6	21
Bob Jones	83	134	30	.224	5	23
Duane Walker	53	132	23	.174	5	11
Alan Bannister	57	122	32	.262	1	6
Glenn Brummer	49	108	30	.278	0	5
Tom Dunbar	45	104	21	.202	1	5
Geno Petralli	42	100	27	.270	0	11
Bill Stein	44	79	20	.253	1	12
Ellis Valentine	11	38	8	.211	2	4
Nick Capra	8	8	1	.125	0	0
Jeff Kunkel	2	4	1	.250	0	0
Luis Pujols	1	1	1	1.000	0	0

=== Pitching ===
==== Starting pitchers ====
Note: G = Games pitched; IP = Innings pitched; W = Wins; L = Losses; ERA = Earned run average; SO = Strikeouts

Player	G	IP	W	L	ERA	SO
Charlie Hough	34	250.1	14	16	3.31	141
Mike Mason	38	179.0	8	15	4.83	92
Frank Tanana	13	77.2	2	7	5.91	52
Jeff Russell	13	62.0	3	6	7.55	44
José Guzmán	5	33.0	3	2	2.76	24

==== Other pitchers ====
Note: G = Games pitched; IP = Innings pitched; W = Wins; L = Losses; ERA = Earned run average; SO = Strikeouts

Player	G	IP	W	L	ERA	SO
Burt Hooton	29	124.0	5	8	5.23	62
Dickie Noles	28	110.1	4	8	5.06	59
Chris Welsh	25	76.1	2	5	4.13	31
Glen Cook	9	40.0	2	3	9.45	19
Matt Williams	6	26.0	2	1	2.42	22
Bob Sebra	7	20.1	0	2	7.52	13

==== Relief pitchers ====
Note: G = Games pitched; IP = Innings pitched; W = Wins; L = Losses; SV = Saves; ERA = Earned run average; SO = Strikeouts

Player	G	IP	W	L	SV	ERA	SO
Greg A. Harris	58	113.0	5	4	11	2.47	111
Dave Schmidt	51	85.2	7	6	5	3.15	46
Dave Stewart	42	81.1	0	6	4	5.42	64
Dave Rozema	34	88.0	3	7	7	4.19	42
Dwayne Henry	16	21.0	2	2	3	2.57	20
Rich Surhoff	7	7.1	0	1	2	7.56	8
Tommy Boggs	4	7.0	0	0	0	11.57	6
Ricky Wright	5	7.2	0	0	0	4.70	7
Dale Murray	1	1.0	0	0	0	18.00	0

== Awards and honors ==
All-Star Game

- Gary Ward, outfield, reserve

== Farm system ==
Level	Team	League	Manager
AAA	Oklahoma City 89ers	American Association	Dave Oliver
AA	Tulsa Drillers	Texas League	Orlando Gómez
A	Salem Redbirds	Carolina League	Bill Stearns
A	Daytona Beach Islanders	Florida State League	Jim Hutto
A	Burlington Rangers	Midwest League	Mike Bucci
Rookie	GCL Rangers	Gulf Coast League	Rudy Jaramillo

Daytona Beach affiliation shared with Baltimore Orioles
