= 1985 Oakland Athletics season =

1985 Oakland Athletics
- League: American League
- Division: West
- Ballpark: Oakland–Alameda County Coliseum
- City: Oakland, California
- Record: 77–85 (.475)
- Divisional place: 5th
- Owners: Walter A. Haas, Jr.
- General managers: Sandy Alderson
- Managers: Jackie Moore
- Television: KPIX (Bill King, Lon Simmons, Monte Moore)
- Radio: KSFO (Bill King, Lon Simmons, Ted Robinson)

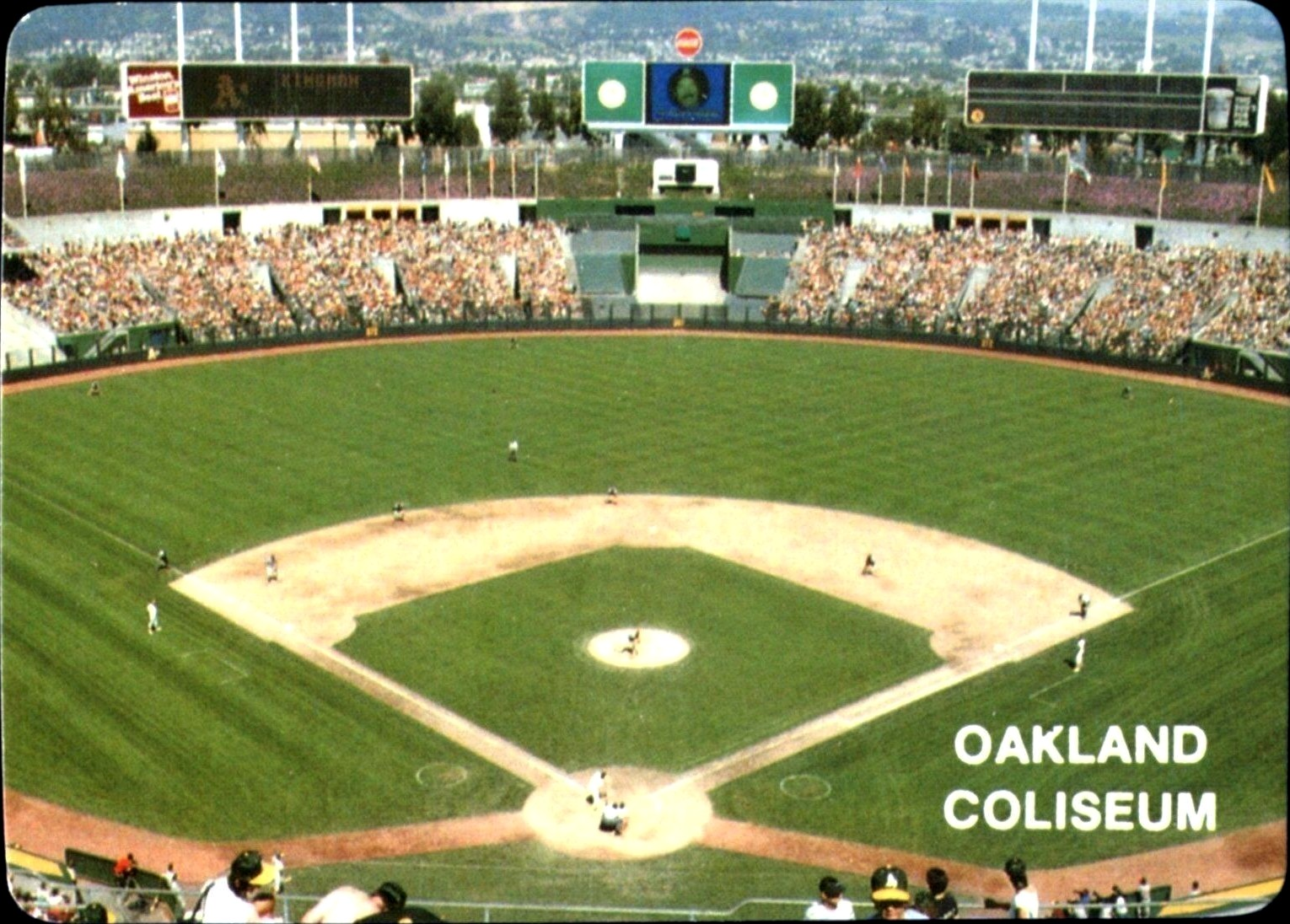
The A's hosting a game at the Oakland–Alameda County Coliseum in 1985.

The 1985 Oakland Athletics season was the 85th season for the Oakland Athletics franchise, all as members of the American League, and their 18th season in Oakland. The Athletics finished fifth in the American League West with a record of 77 wins and 85 losses. While the Athletics' on-field performance continued to disappoint, the debut of slugger Jose Canseco gave fans a measure of hope.

== Offseason ==
- December 5, 1984: Rickey Henderson, Bert Bradley and cash were traded by the Athletics to the New York Yankees for Stan Javier, Jay Howell, José Rijo, Eric Plunk, and Tim Birtsas.
- December 7, 1984: Ray Burris, Eric Barry (minors) and a player to be named later were traded by the Athletics to the Milwaukee Brewers for Don Sutton. The Athletics completed the deal by sending Ed Myers (minors) to the Brewers on March 25, 1985.
- December 8, 1984: Bill Caudill was traded by the Athletics to the Toronto Blue Jays for Alfredo Griffin, Dave Collins, and cash.
- February 5, 1985: Rob Picciolo was signed as a free agent with the Oakland Athletics.

== Regular season ==
- September 2, 1985: José Canseco made his major league debut in a game against the Baltimore Orioles. Canseco had one at bat without a hit.
- September 9, 1985: Canseco hits his first career major league home run off the Texas Ranger's Jeff Russell in a 3–1 loss.
- September 22, 1985: José Canseco became the 27th player to hit a home run over the roof of Comiskey Park.

=== Season standings ===
AL West
Team	W	L	Pct.	GB	Home	Road
Kansas City Royals	91	71	.562	—	50‍–‍32	41‍–‍39
California Angels	90	72	.556	1	49‍–‍30	41‍–‍42
Chicago White Sox	85	77	.525	6	45‍–‍36	40‍–‍41
Minnesota Twins	77	85	.475	14	49‍–‍35	28‍–‍50
Oakland Athletics	77	85	.475	14	43‍–‍36	34‍–‍49
Seattle Mariners	74	88	.457	17	42‍–‍41	32‍–‍47
Texas Rangers	62	99	.385	28½	37‍–‍43	25‍–‍56

=== Record vs. opponents ===
1985 American League record Sources:
Team	BAL	BOS	CAL	CWS	CLE	DET	KC	MIL	MIN	NYY	OAK	SEA	TEX	TOR
Baltimore	—	5–8	7–5	8–4	8–5	6–7	6–6	9–4	6–6	1–12	7–5	6–6	10–2	4–8
Boston	8–5	—	5–7	4–8–1	8–5	6–7	5–7	5–8	7–5	5–8	8–4	6–6	5–7	9–4
California	5–7	7–5	—	8–5	8–4	8–4	4–9	9–3	9–4	3–9	6–7	9–4	9–4	5–7
Chicago	4–8	8–4–1	5–8	—	10–2	6–6	5–8	5–7	6–7	6–6	8–5	9–4	10–3	3–9
Cleveland	5–8	5–8	4–8	2–10	—	5–8	2–10	7–6	4–8	6–7	3–9	6–6	7–5	4–9
Detroit	7–6	7–6	4–8	6–6	8–5	—	5–7	9–4	3–9	9–3	8–4	5–7	7–5	6–7
Kansas City	6–6	7–5	9–4	8–5	10–2	7–5	—	8–4	7–6	5–7	8–5	3–10	6–7	7–5
Milwaukee	4–9	8–5	3–9	7–5	6–7	4–9	4–8	—	9–3	7–6	3–9	4–8	8–3	4–9
Minnesota	6–6	5–7	4–9	7–6	8–4	9–3	6–7	3–9	—	3–9	8–5	6–7	8–5	4–8
New York	12–1	8–5	9–3	6–6	7–6	3–9	7–5	6–7	9–3	—	7–5	9–3	8–4	6–7
Oakland	5–7	4–8	7–6	5–8	9–3	4–8	5–8	9–3	5–8	5–7	—	8–5	6–7	5–7
Seattle	6–6	6–6	4–9	4–9	6–6	7–5	10–3	8–4	7–6	3–9	5–8	—	6–7	2–10
Texas	2–10	7–5	4–9	3–10	5–7	5–7	7–6	3–8	5–8	4–8	7–6	7–6	—	3–9
Toronto	8–4	4–9	7–5	9–3	9–4	7–6	5–7	9–4	8–4	7–6	7–5	10–2	9–3	—

=== Transactions ===
- April 15, 1985: Bob Owchinko was signed as a free agent with the Oakland Athletics.
- April 26, 1985: Bill Mooneyham was signed as a free agent by the Athletics.
- July 12, 1985: Tommy John was signed as a free agent by the Athletics.
- July 17, 1985: Bob Owchinko was purchased by the Chicago White Sox from the Oakland Athletics.
- September 10, 1985: Don Sutton was traded by the Athletics to the California Angels for players to be named later. The Angels completed the deal by sending Robert Sharpnack (minors) and Jerome Nelson (minors) to the Athletics on September 25.

==== Draft picks ====
- June 3, 1985: 1985 Major League Baseball draft
  - Walt Weiss was drafted by the Athletics in the 1st round (11th pick). Player signed June 5, 1985.
  - Dave Otto was drafted by the Athletics in the 2nd round.
  - Wally Whitehurst was drafted by the Athletics in the 3rd round.
  - Jim Pena was drafted by the Athletics in the 24th round, but did not sign.

=== Roster ===
1985 Oakland Athletics
Roster
Pitchers: 55 Keith Atherton; 48 Tim Birtsas; 23 Chris Codiroli; 24 Tim Conroy; 30 Jay Howell; 25 Tommy John; 40 Jeff Kaiser; 32 Bill Krueger; 22 Rick Langford; 54 Steve McCatty; 36 Steve Mura; 53 Steve Ontiveros; 38 José Rijo; 20,27 Don Sutton; 34 Tom Tellmann; 43 Mike Warren; 29 Curt Young	Catchers: 2 Mike Heath; 7 Charlie O'Brien; 6 Mickey Tettleton; Infielders: 12 Dusty Baker; 20 Bruce Bochte; 9 Mike Gallego; 3 Alfredo Griffin; 25 Donnie Hill; 28 Steve Kiefer; 4 Carney Lansford; 12,13 Dan Meyer; 18 Tony Phillips; 8 Rob Picciolo	Outfielders: 33 Jose Canseco; 11 Dave Collins; 16 Mike Davis; 5 Steve Henderson; 21 Dwayne Murphy; Other batters: 10 Dave Kingman	Manager: 42 Jackie Moore; Coaches: 41 Clete Boyer (Third Base); 45 Bob Didier (First Base); 46 Dave McKay (Bullpen); 44 Wes Stock (Pitching); 26 Billy Williams (Hitting); -- Bob Watson

== Player stats ==
=== Batting ===
==== Starters by position ====
Note: Pos = Position; G = Games played; AB = At bats; H = Hits; Avg. = Batting average; HR = Home runs; RBI = Runs batted in

Pos	Player	G	AB	H	Avg.	HR	RBI
C	Mike Heath	138	436	109	.250	13	55
1B	Bruce Bochte	137	424	125	.295	14	60
2B	Donnie Hill	123	393	112	.285	3	48
SS	Alfredo Griffin	162	614	166	.270	2	64
3B	Carney Lansford	98	401	111	.277	13	46
LF	Dave Collins	112	379	95	.251	4	29
CF	Dwayne Murphy	152	523	122	.233	20	59
RF	Mike Davis	154	547	157	.287	24	82
DH	Dave Kingman	158	592	141	.238	30	91

==== Other batters ====
Note: G = Games played; AB = At bats; H = Hits; Avg. = Batting average; HR = Home runs; RBI = Runs batted in

Player	G	AB	H	Avg.	HR	RBI
Dusty Baker	111	343	92	.268	14	52
Mickey Tettleton	78	211	53	.251	3	15
Steve Henderson	85	193	58	.301	3	31
Tony Phillips	42	161	45	.280	4	17
Rob Picciolo	71	102	28	.275	1	8
José Canseco	29	96	29	.302	5	13
Mike Gallego	76	77	16	.208	1	9
Steve Kiefer	40	66	13	.197	1	10
Dan Meyer	14	12	0	.000	0	0
Charlie O'Brien	16	11	3	.273	0	1

=== Pitching ===
==== Starting pitchers ====
Note: G = Games pitched; IP = Innings pitched; W = Wins; L = Losses; ERA = Earned run average; SO = Strikeouts

Player	G	IP	W	L	ERA	SO
Chris Codiroli	37	226.0	14	14	4.46	111
Don Sutton	29	194.1	13	8	3.89	91
Bill Krueger	32	151.1	9	10	4.52	56
Tim Birtsas	29	141.1	10	6	4.01	94
José Rijo	12	63.2	6	4	3.53	65

==== Other pitchers ====
Note: G = Games pitched; IP = Innings pitched; W = Wins; L = Losses; ERA = Earned run average; SO = Strikeouts

Player	G	IP	W	L	ERA	SO
Steve McCatty	30	85.2	4	4	5.57	36
Rick Langford	23	59.0	3	5	3.51	21
Mike Warren	16	49.0	1	4	6.61	48
Tommy John	11	48.0	2	6	6.19	8
Curt Young	19	46.0	0	4	7.24	19

==== Relief pitchers ====
Note: G = Games pitched; W = Wins; L = Losses; SV = Saves; ERA = Earned run average; SO = Strikeouts

Player	G	W	L	SV	ERA	SO
Jay Howell	63	9	8	29	2.85	68
Keith Atherton	56	4	7	3	4.30	77
Steve Ontiveros	39	1	3	8	1.93	36
Steve Mura	23	1	1	1	4.13	29
Tim Conroy	16	0	1	0	4.26	8
Jeff Kaiser	15	0	0	0	14.58	10
Tom Tellmann	11	0	0	0	5.06	8

== Farm system ==
Level	Team	League	Manager
AAA	Tacoma Tigers	Pacific Coast League	Keith Lieppman
AA	Huntsville Stars	Southern League	Brad Fischer
A	Modesto A's	California League	George Mitterwald
A	Madison Muskies	Midwest League	Jim Nettles
A-Short Season	Medford A's	Northwest League	Grady Fuson
Rookie	Pocatello Gems	Pioneer League	Dave Hudgens

LEAGUE CHAMPIONS: Huntsville
