= Bryan Little (baseball) =

American baseball player (born 1959)

- Second baseman
- Born: October 8, 1959 (age 66); Houston, Texas, U.S.
- Batted: Both Threw: Right

MLB debut
- July 29, 1982, for the Montreal Expos

Last MLB appearance
- October 5, 1986, for the New York Yankees

MLB statistics
- Batting average: .245
- Home runs: 3
- Runs batted in: 77
- Stats at Baseball Reference

Teams
- Montreal Expos (1982–1984); Chicago White Sox (1985–1986); New York Yankees (1986)

Richard Bryan "Twig" Little (born October 8, 1959) is an American former professional baseball player. He played all or part of five seasons in Major League Baseball, primarily as a second baseman. He currently works for the Chicago White Sox as an advance scout and special instructor, a position he has held since 2001.

Bryan is the brother of former major league manager Grady Little.
