= Bill Swaggerty =

American baseball player (born 1956)

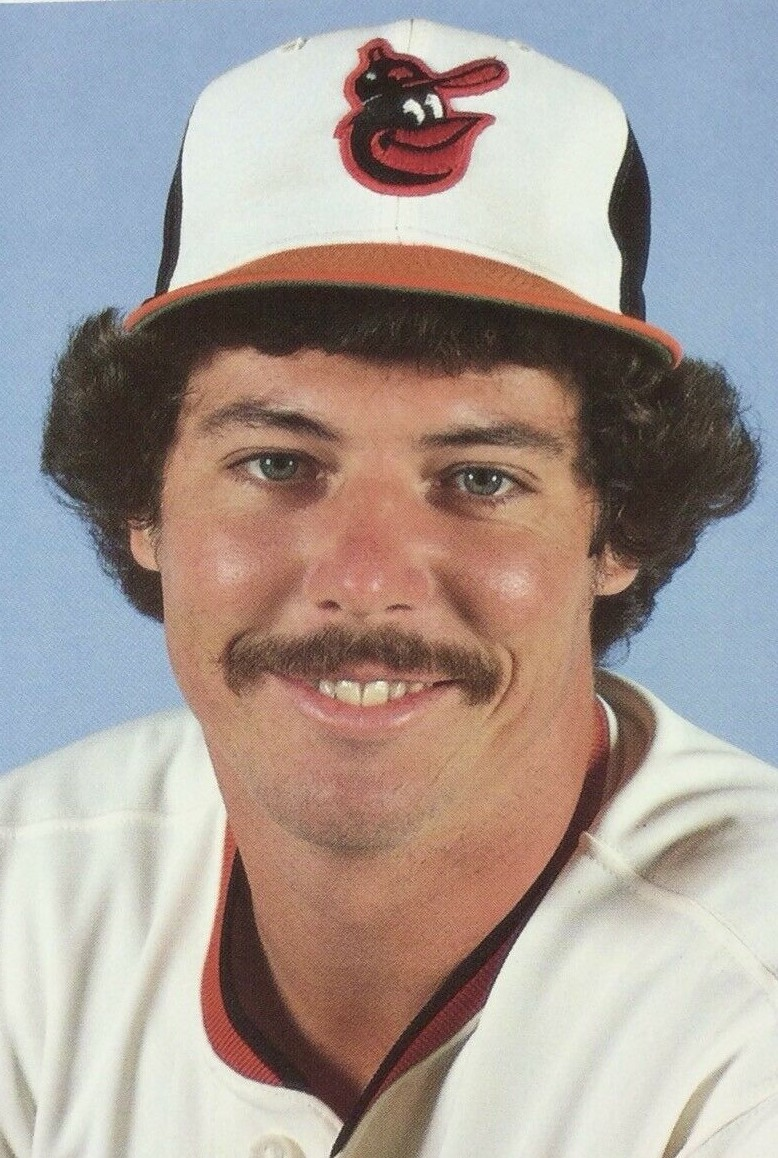
- Pitcher
- Born: December 5, 1956 (age 68); Sanford, Florida, U.S.
- Batted: Right Threw: Right

MLB debut
- August 13, 1983, for the Baltimore Orioles

Last MLB appearance
- May 4, 1986, for the Baltimore Orioles

MLB statistics
- Win–loss record: 4–3
- Earned run average: 4.76
- Strikeouts: 28
- Stats at Baseball Reference

Teams
- Baltimore Orioles (1983–1986)

William David Swaggerty (born December 5, 1956) is a former Major League Baseball pitcher who played for the Baltimore Orioles from 1983 to 1986.

== Career ==
A native of Sanford, Florida, Swaggerty attended Stetson College, and played collegiate summer baseball in 1978 with the Wareham Gatemen of the Cape Cod Baseball League.

Swaggerty made his Major League debut on August 13, 1983 for the World Series champion Baltimore Orioles. He went on to appear in 32 games for the Orioles between 1983 and 1986, making 8 starts.

After two years in the Kansas City Royals' farm system, Swaggerty retired after the 1988 season.
