= Dave Von Ohlen =

American baseball player (born 1958)

- Pitcher
- Born: October 25, 1958 (age 67); Flushing, New York, U.S.
- Batted: Right Threw: Left

MLB debut
- May 13, 1983, for the St. Louis Cardinals

Last MLB appearance
- June 21, 1987, for the Oakland Athletics

MLB statistics
- Win–loss record: 7–7
- Earned run average: 3.33
- Strikeouts: 59
- Stats at Baseball Reference

Teams
- St. Louis Cardinals (1983–1984); Cleveland Indians (1985); Oakland Athletics (1986–1987)

David Von Ohlen (born October 25, 1958) is an American former professional baseball pitcher. Von Ohlen pitched in all or part of five seasons in Major League Baseball from 1983 through 1987. He appeared in 181 Major League games, all in relief.

== Early career ==
Von Ohlen was selected by the New York Mets out of Flushing High School in the 17th round of the 1976 Major League Baseball draft. He spent six seasons in the Mets farm system without making it to the majors, and he was granted free agency after the 1982 season.

== Major League career ==
Von Ohlen signed as a free agent with the St. Louis Cardinals in December 1982, and made his major league debut with the team on May 13, 1983, working 1 2/3 innings of perfect relief against the Montreal Expos. He pitched two seasons for St. Louis, appearing in 73 games with an ERA of 3.23. He was released by the Cardinals on November 9, 1984, and signed with the Cleveland Indians on January 9, 1985. In 1985, Von Ohlen put up an ERA of 2.91 in 26 appearances, but was released after the 1985 season.

Von Ohlen started the 1986 season with the Miami Marlins, an independent team in the Florida State League. He was purchased from them on June 1, 1986, by the Oakland Athletics, where he pitched in 28 games between 1986 and 1987 before again being released. On June 21, 1987, in his final major league appearance, Von Ohlen pitched the final three innings of Oakland's 13–3 loss to the Texas Rangers in the second game of a double header at the Oakland-Alameda County Coliseum.

Von Ohlen returned to the Marlins to start the 1988 season before being re-signed by Oakland (but did not appear in another major league game), finishing his professional career with the Tacoma Tigers in the A's organization.

== Sources ==
- Career statistics from MLB · Baseball Reference · Baseball Reference (Minors) · Retrosheet · Baseball Almanac
