= 1985 Milwaukee Brewers season =

1985 Milwaukee Brewers
- League: American League
- Division: East
- Ballpark: Milwaukee County Stadium
- City: Milwaukee, Wisconsin
- Record: 71–90 (.441)
- Divisional place: 6th
- Owners: Bud Selig
- General managers: Harry Dalton
- Managers: George Bamberger
- Television: WVTV (Steve Shannon, Mike Hegan)
- Radio: WTMJ (AM) (Bob Uecker, Pat Hughes)

The 1985 Milwaukee Brewers season was the 16th season for the Brewers in Milwaukee, and the 17th overall.

The Brewers' finished sixth in the American League East with a record of 71 wins and 90 losses and missed the postseason for the 3rd consecutive season.

== Offseason ==
- December 7, 1984: Don Sutton was traded by the Brewers to the Oakland Athletics for Ray Burris, Eric Barry (minors), and a player to be named later. The Athletics completed the deal by sending Ed Myers (minors) to the Brewers on March 25, 1985.
- January 3, 1985: Steve Carter was drafted by the Milwaukee Brewers in the 3rd round of the 1985 amateur draft (January), but did not sign.
- January 8, 1985: Jim Kern was signed as a free agent by the Brewers.
- January 18, 1985: Jim Sundberg was traded by the Brewers to the Kansas City Royals as part of a 4-team trade. Danny Darwin and a player to be named later were traded by the Texas Rangers to the Brewers, and Tim Leary was traded by the New York Mets to the Brewers. Don Slaught was traded by the Kansas City Royals to the Rangers. Frank Wills was traded by the Royals to the Mets. The Rangers completed the trade by sending Bill Nance (minors) to the Brewers on January 30.
- April 3, 1985: Yutaka Enatsu was cut after a spring training tryout with the team at age 36.

== Regular season ==
=== Season standings ===
AL East
Team	W	L	Pct.	GB	Home	Road
Toronto Blue Jays	99	62	.615	—	54‍–‍26	45‍–‍36
New York Yankees	97	64	.602	2	58‍–‍22	39‍–‍42
Detroit Tigers	84	77	.522	15	44‍–‍37	40‍–‍40
Baltimore Orioles	83	78	.516	16	45‍–‍36	38‍–‍42
Boston Red Sox	81	81	.500	18½	43‍–‍37	38‍–‍44
Milwaukee Brewers	71	90	.441	28	40‍–‍40	31‍–‍50
Cleveland Indians	60	102	.370	39½	38‍–‍43	22‍–‍59

=== Record vs. opponents ===
1985 American League record Sources:
Team	BAL	BOS	CAL	CWS	CLE	DET	KC	MIL	MIN	NYY	OAK	SEA	TEX	TOR
Baltimore	—	5–8	7–5	8–4	8–5	6–7	6–6	9–4	6–6	1–12	7–5	6–6	10–2	4–8
Boston	8–5	—	5–7	4–8–1	8–5	6–7	5–7	5–8	7–5	5–8	8–4	6–6	5–7	9–4
California	5–7	7–5	—	8–5	8–4	8–4	4–9	9–3	9–4	3–9	6–7	9–4	9–4	5–7
Chicago	4–8	8–4–1	5–8	—	10–2	6–6	5–8	5–7	6–7	6–6	8–5	9–4	10–3	3–9
Cleveland	5–8	5–8	4–8	2–10	—	5–8	2–10	7–6	4–8	6–7	3–9	6–6	7–5	4–9
Detroit	7–6	7–6	4–8	6–6	8–5	—	5–7	9–4	3–9	9–3	8–4	5–7	7–5	6–7
Kansas City	6–6	7–5	9–4	8–5	10–2	7–5	—	8–4	7–6	5–7	8–5	3–10	6–7	7–5
Milwaukee	4–9	8–5	3–9	7–5	6–7	4–9	4–8	—	9–3	7–6	3–9	4–8	8–3	4–9
Minnesota	6–6	5–7	4–9	7–6	8–4	9–3	6–7	3–9	—	3–9	8–5	6–7	8–5	4–8
New York	12–1	8–5	9–3	6–6	7–6	3–9	7–5	6–7	9–3	—	7–5	9–3	8–4	6–7
Oakland	5–7	4–8	7–6	5–8	9–3	4–8	5–8	9–3	5–8	5–7	—	8–5	6–7	5–7
Seattle	6–6	6–6	4–9	4–9	6–6	7–5	10–3	8–4	7–6	3–9	5–8	—	6–7	2–10
Texas	2–10	7–5	4–9	3–10	5–7	5–7	7–6	3–8	5–8	4–8	7–6	7–6	—	3–9
Toronto	8–4	4–9	7–5	9–3	9–4	7–6	5–7	9–4	8–4	7–6	7–5	10–2	9–3	—

=== Notable transactions ===
- June 17, 1985: Jim Kern was released by the Brewers.

==== Draft picks ====
- June 3, 1985: B. J. Surhoff was drafted by the Brewers in the 1st round (1st pick) of the 1985 Major League Baseball draft.
- June 3, 1985: Steve Carter was drafted by the Milwaukee Brewers in the 3rd round of the 1985 amateur draft (June Secondary), but did not sign.

=== Roster ===
1985 Milwaukee Brewers
Roster
Pitchers: 48 Ray Burris; 47 Jaime Cocanower; 18 Danny Darwin; 34 Rollie Fingers; 40 Bob Gibson; 30 Moose Haas; 49 Teddy Higuera; 42 Jim Kern; 27 Pete Ladd; 39 Tim Leary; 37 Brad Lesley; 10 Bob McClure; 43 Chuck Porter; 41 Ray Searage; 50 Pete Vuckovich; 20 Rick Waits; 46 Bill Wegman	Catchers: 42 Dave Huppert; 22 Charlie Moore; 21 Bill Schroeder; Infielders: 15 Cecil Cooper; 17 Jim Gantner; 26 Brian Giles; 4 Paul Molitor; 36 Carlos Ponce; 1 Ernest Riles; 11 Ed Romero	Outfielders: 29 Mark Brouhard; 25 Bobby Clark; 16 Mike Felder; 7 Paul Householder; 14 Dion James; 5 Doug Loman; 28 Rick Manning; 24 Ben Oglivie; 2 Randy Ready; 9 Billy Jo Robidoux; 19 Robin Yount; Other batters: 23 Ted Simmons	Manager: 31 George Bamberger; Coaches: 45 Andy Etchebarren (First Base); 12 Larry Haney (Bullpen); 33 Frank Howard (Hitting); 35 Tony Muser (Third Base); 38 Herm Starrette (Pitching)

== Player stats ==
=== Batting ===
==== Starters by position ====
Note: Pos = Position; G = Games played; AB = At bats; H = Hits; Avg. = Batting average; HR = Home runs; RBI = Runs batted in

Pos	Player	G	AB	H	Avg.	HR	RBI
C	Charlie Moore	105	349	81	.232	0	31
1B	Cecil Cooper	154	631	185	.293	16	99
2B	Jim Gantner	143	523	133	.254	5	44
SS	Ernie Riles	116	448	128	.286	5	45
3B	Paul Molitor	140	576	171	.297	10	48
LF	Robin Yount	122	466	129	.277	15	68
CF	Rick Manning	79	216	47	.218	2	18
RF	Paul Householder	95	299	77	.258	11	34
DH	Ted Simmons	143	528	144	.273	12	76

==== Other batters ====
Note: G = Games played; AB = At bats; H = Hits; Avg. = Batting average; HR = Home runs; RBI = Runs batted in

Player	G	AB	H	Avg.	HR	RBI
Ben Oglivie	101	341	99	.290	10	61
Ed Romero	88	251	63	.251	0	21
Bill Schroeder	53	194	47	.242	8	25
Randy Ready	48	181	48	.265	1	21
Mark Brouhard	37	108	28	.259	1	13
Bobby Clark	29	93	21	.226	0	8
Doug Loman	24	66	14	.212	0	7
Carlos Ponce	21	62	10	.161	1	5
Brian Giles	34	58	10	.172	1	1
Mike Felder	15	56	11	.196	0	0
Billy Jo Robidoux	18	51	9	.176	3	8
Dion James	18	49	11	.224	0	3
Dave Huppert	15	21	1	.048	0	0

=== Pitching ===
==== Starting pitchers ====
Note: G = Games pitched; IP = Innings pitched; W = Wins; L = Losses; ERA = Earned run average; SO = Strikeouts

Player	G	IP	W	L	ERA	SO
Danny Darwin	39	217.2	8	18	3.80	125
Teddy Higuera	32	212.1	15	8	3.90	127
Ray Burris	29	170.1	9	13	4.81	81
Moose Haas	27	161.2	8	8	3.84	78
Pete Vuckovich	22	112.2	6	10	5.51	55
Tim Leary	5	33.1	1	4	4.05	29
Bill Wegman	3	17.2	2	0	3.57	6

==== Other pitchers ====
Note: G = Games pitched; IP = Innings pitched; W = Wins; L = Losses; ERA = Earned run average; SO = Strikeouts

Player	G	IP	W	L	ERA	SO
Jaime Cocanower	24	116.1	6	8	4.33	44
Chuck Porter	6	13.2	0	0	1.98	8

==== Relief pitchers ====
Note: G = Games pitched; W = Wins; L = Losses; SV = Saves; ERA = Earned run average; SO = Strikeouts

Player	G	W	L	SV	ERA	SO
Rollie Fingers	47	1	6	17	5.04	24
Bob Gibson	41	6	7	11	3.90	53
Bob McClure	38	4	1	3	4.31	57
Ray Searage	33	1	4	1	5.92	36
Pete Ladd	29	0	0	2	4.53	22
Rick Waits	24	3	2	1	6.51	24
Jim Kern	5	0	1	0	6.55	3
Brad Lesley	5	1	0	0	9.95	5

== Farm system ==
The Brewers' farm system consisted of five minor league affiliates in 1985. The Vancouver Canadians won the Pacific Coast League championship.

Level	Team	League	Manager
Triple-A	Vancouver Canadians	Pacific Coast League	Tom Trebelhorn
Double-A	El Paso Diablos	Texas League	Terry Bevington
Class A	Stockton Ports	California League	Tom Gamboa
Class A	Beloit Brewers	Midwest League	Dave Machemer
Rookie	Helena Gold Sox	Pioneer League	Mike Easom
