= Tom Klawitter =

American baseball player

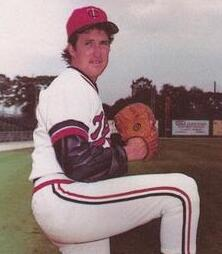
- Klawitter with the Minnesota Twins c. 1985
- Pitcher
- Born: June 24, 1958 (age 68); La Crosse, Wisconsin, U.S.
- Batted: Right Threw: Left

MLB debut
- April 14, 1985, for the Minnesota Twins

Last MLB appearance
- May 21, 1985, for the Minnesota Twins

MLB statistics
- Win–loss record: 0–0
- Earned run average: 6.75
- Strikeouts: 5
- Stats at Baseball Reference

Teams
- Minnesota Twins (1985)

Thomas Carl Klawitter (born June 24, 1958) is an American former professional baseball pitcher. He played part of 1985 in Major League Baseball for the Minnesota Twins. He appeared in seven games, including two starts, without a decision.

Klawitter was a physical education teacher at Parker High School in Janesville, Wisconsin for 29 years, until his retirement in June 2015. He has also been a coach or assistant coach at the high school level. He was the head varsity girls' basketball coach at Parker for 26 seasons, guiding his teams to 16 conference titles, 12 state appearances, and 3 state championships. He was the AP state coach of the year for the 1992–93 season. Klawitter ranked fifth in number of wins for Wisconsin high school girls' basketball coaches (as of the 2014–15 season), with a 564–128 record.

Klawitter served as an assistant coach with the UW–Whitewater baseball team. He had previously been an assistant with both Janesville Parkers and Janesville Craigs high school baseball teams.

Klawitter was inducted into the Wisconsin State League (also known as the Wisconsin State Baseball League), in 2007.

== Sources ==
- Career statistics from Baseball Reference · Fangraphs · Baseball Reference (Minors) · Retrosheet · Baseball Almanac
