= Al Pardo =

Spanish baseball player (born 1962)

- Catcher
- Born: September 8, 1962 (age 62); Oviedo, Spain
- Batted: Switch Threw: Right

MLB debut
- July 3, 1985, for the Baltimore Orioles

Last MLB appearance
- September 9, 1989, for the Philadelphia Phillies

MLB statistics
- Batting average: .132
- Hits: 17
- Home runs: 1

CPBL statistics
- Batting average: .296
- Hits: 84
- Home runs: 6
- Stats at Baseball Reference

Teams
- Baltimore Orioles (1985–1986); Philadelphia Phillies (1988–1989); Mercuries Tigers (1991–1992)

Alberto Judas Pardo (born September 8, 1962) is a Spanish-born Cuban American former catcher who played in Major League Baseball for the Baltimore Orioles and the Philadelphia Phillies. As of 2021, he is one of only four players in Major League history to have been born in Spain.

Pardo was born to refugees who fled the Cuban Revolution, and his family immigrated to the United States at a young age. He played baseball at Jefferson High School in Tampa, Florida, where he was teammates with Fred McGriff.

The only home run in his career came against Chicago White Sox pitcher Joe Cowley.
