= Mark Funderburk =

American baseball player (born 1957)

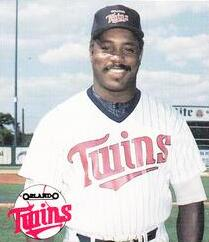
- Funderburk as a coach with the Orlando Twins c. 1988
- Outfielder/Designated hitter
- Born: May 16, 1957 (age 68); Charlotte, North Carolina
- Batted: Right Threw: Right

MLB debut
- September 4, 1981, for the Minnesota Twins

Last MLB appearance
- October 5, 1985, for the Minnesota Twins

MLB statistics
- Batting average: .294
- Hits: 25
- Runs Batted In: 15
- Stats at Baseball Reference

Teams
- Minnesota Twins (1981, 1985)

Mark Clifford Funderburk (born May 16, 1957) is a retired Major League Baseball outfielder and designated hitter. He played during two seasons at the major league level for the Minnesota Twins. He was drafted by the Twins in the 16th round of the 1976 amateur entry draft. Funderburk played his first professional season with their Rookie League Elizabethton Twins in 1976, and his last with their Double-A Orlando Twins in 1987.

He also played for the Venezuelan Professional Baseball League (LVBP) with Navegantes del Magallanes. He became the first player to hit two home runs in the same inning in the LVBP on November 16, 1985 against Leones del Caracas. He also played for the Rimini Baseball Club in the Italian Baseball League.
