= Bob Long (baseball) =

American baseball player (born 1954)

- Pitcher
- Born: November 11, 1954 (age 71); Jasper, Tennessee, U.S.
- Batted: Right Threw: Right

MLB debut
- September 2, 1981, for the Pittsburgh Pirates

Last MLB appearance
- October 2, 1985, for the Seattle Mariners

MLB statistics
- Win–loss record: 1–2
- Earned run average: 4.50
- Strikeouts: 37
- Stats at Baseball Reference

Teams
- Pittsburgh Pirates (1981); Seattle Mariners (1985)

Robert Earl Long (born November 11, 1954) is an American former professional baseball pitcher. He had two separate stints in the Major League Baseball (MLB), four years apart. Long appeared in five games for the Pittsburgh Pirates in 1981, then made 28 appearances for the Seattle Mariners in 1985.

Long began playing baseball in Dixie Youth Baseball in 1967. He attended Chattanooga Central High School in Tennessee, where he threw three no-hitters for the baseball team. He then attended Carson–Newman College and Shorter College. At Shorter, he won two district championships. The Pirates drafted him in the 24th round of the 1976 MLB draft. He converted to a submarine pitcher after the 1977 season, taught by minor league instructor Harry Dorish. He was named the Pacific Coast League right handed pitcher of the year in 1981 and was a September call-up to Pittsburgh. He went 1–2 with a 5.85 earned run average in 3 starts and two relief appearances.

Long returned to the minors and became a free agent after the 1982 season. He signed with the Chicago White Sox on March 15, 1983 but was released in early April. He signed with the Mariners the following month. He returned to the majors in June 1985. He pitched in 28 games, all but two of them Seattle losses, with no record, one hold, and a 3.76 ERA n 38 1/3 innings. He pitched two more seasons in the minors.

After his playing career, Long has coached high school baseball. He was inducted into Shorter's athletics hall of fame in 2002 and the Greater Chattanooga Sports Hall of Fame in 2014.

== Personal life ==
Long is married. His boyhood idols were Willie Stargell, who was his teammate in Pittsburgh, and Pete Rose.
