= Jim Weaver (outfielder) =

American baseball player (born 1959)

- Outfielder
- Born: October 10, 1959 (age 66); Kingston, New York, U.S.
- Batted: Left Threw: Left

MLB debut
- April 10, 1985, for the Detroit Tigers

Last MLB appearance
- September 30, 1989, for the San Francisco Giants

MLB statistics
- Batting average: .161
- Home runs: 0
- Runs batted in: 2
- Stats at Baseball Reference

Teams
- Detroit Tigers (1985); Seattle Mariners (1987); San Francisco Giants (1989)

James Francis Weaver (born October 10, 1959) is an American former professional baseball outfielder for the Detroit Tigers (1985), Seattle Mariners (1987), and San Francisco Giants (1989) of Major League Baseball (MLB).

Weaver was born in Kingston, New York but moved to Holmes Beach, Florida with his parents in 1960. He attended Cardinal Mooney High School in Sarasota, Florida and played college baseball at Manatee Junior College and Florida State University. The Sporting News named Weaver an All-American in 1980.

The Minnesota Twins drafted Weaver in the second round of the 1980 MLB draft. In 1983, he set Orlando Twins team records with 43 stolen bases and 20 outfield assists. The Tigers selected Weaver in the 1984 Rule 5 draft, and he made his MLB debut in April 1985, batting .143 in 12 games. The Tigers returned him to the Twins in May. That August, Minnesota traded him with Jay Bell, Curt Wardle and a player to be named later, later identified as Rich Yett, to the Cleveland Indians for Bert Blyleven. Cleveland released Weaver after the 1986 season.

Weaver signed with the Mariners in January 1987. He was a September call-up to Seattle. He played in 7 games, starting once. He batted 0-for-6 with two walks and a stolen base. Seattle released him in November.

Wright signed with the Houston Astros in 1988, then the Chicago White Sox in 1989. Chicago traded him to the Giants for George Wright in August. He returned to the majors after the trade. As a pinch runner, he scored the game winning run in a 13-inning win over the Cincinnati Reds. In 12 games, he batted 4-for-20.
