= Mark Brown (baseball) =

American baseball player (born 1959)

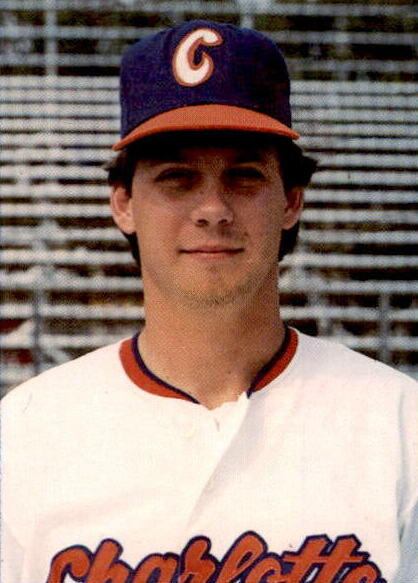
- Brown with the Charlotte O's c. 1986
- Pitcher
- Born: July 13, 1959 (age 65); Bellows Falls, Vermont, U.S.
- Batted: Switch Threw: Right

MLB debut
- August 9, 1984, for the Baltimore Orioles

Last MLB appearance
- August 11, 1985, for the Minnesota Twins

MLB statistics
- Win–loss record: 1–2
- Earned run average: 5.12
- Strikeouts: 15
- Stats at Baseball Reference

Teams
- Baltimore Orioles (1984); Minnesota Twins (1985)

Mark Anthony Brown (born July 13, 1959) is a former professional baseball pitcher. He pitched parts of two seasons in Major League Baseball, 1984 for the Baltimore Orioles and 1985 for the Minnesota Twins. He played college baseball for the University of Massachusetts.
