= Tony Mack =

American baseball player (born 1961)

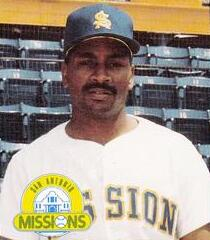
- Mack with the San Antonio Missions c. 1988
- Pitcher
- Born: April 30, 1961 (age 64); Lexington, Kentucky, U.S.
- Batted: Right Threw: Right

MLB debut
- July 27, 1985, for the California Angels

Last MLB appearance
- July 27, 1985, for the California Angels

MLB statistics
- Win–loss record: 0–1
- Earned run average: 15.43
- Strikeouts: 0
- Stats at Baseball Reference

Teams
- California Angels (1985)
Medals
Men's baseball
Representing the United States
World Games
| Gold medal – first place | 1981 Santa Clara | Team |

Tony Lynn Mack (born April 30, 1961) is an American former professional baseball player.

Mack attended Tates Creek High School in Lexington, Kentucky. As a junior in 1978, then standing only 5 ft 7 in (1.70 m), Mack won the semifinal and championship of the Kentucky high school baseball state championship and was named the tournament's most valuable player. With poor grades and following a senior slump, according to a 1982 article in the Lexington Herald-Leader, Mack had "to scrounge for" an opportunity to play college baseball for the Lamar University Cardinals. However, according to a 1985 article in the same newspaper, he had several competing scholarship offers but ultimately decided to attend Lamar "because it was in the South" and he knew that was where he needed to go if he was "serious about baseball."

At Lamar, Mack was named to the All-Southland Conference Team in 1981 and 1982, won a conference championship in 1981 and threw a no-hitter against McNeese State. In 1981, he won a gold medal as a member of the United States national team in the 1981 World Games.

On the advice of Lamar coach Lou Smith, the California Angels selected Mack in the third round of the 1982 Major League Baseball draft. In 1985, in the middle of a pennant race with the Angels low on pitching, Mack was called up to the majors. He would appear in just one Major League Baseball game for the Angels on July 27. Shortly thereafter, the Angels acquired veteran pitchers John Candelaria and Al Holland and Mack's services were no longer required. He was sent back down to the minors but felt he had learned from his brief stint in the majors that he could get Major League hitters out and that he "could play with them."
