= Rich Yett =

American baseball player (born 1962)

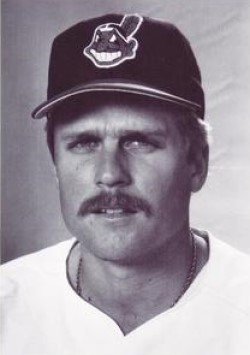
- Pitcher
- Born: October 6, 1962 (age 63); Pomona, California, U.S.
- Batted: Right Threw: Right

MLB debut
- April 13, 1985, for the Minnesota Twins

Last MLB appearance
- April 25, 1990, for the Minnesota Twins

MLB statistics
- Win–loss record: 22–24
- Earned run average: 4.95
- Strikeouts: 229
- Stats at Baseball Reference

Teams
- Minnesota Twins (1985); Cleveland Indians (1986–1989); Minnesota Twins (1990)

Richard Martin Yett (born October 6, 1962) is a former professional baseball pitcher. He played all or part of six seasons in Major League Baseball from 1985 to 1990.

Yett was drafted by the Minnesota Twins in 1980, but Yett only played one game with the team before being traded to the Cleveland Indians in 1985. The next four years he was used often as a long reliever for Cleveland. In late 1989, Yett re-signed with the Twins as a free agent. Yett retired after the 1990 season.

He was born in Pomona, California.
