= Curt Wardle =

American baseball player (born 1960)

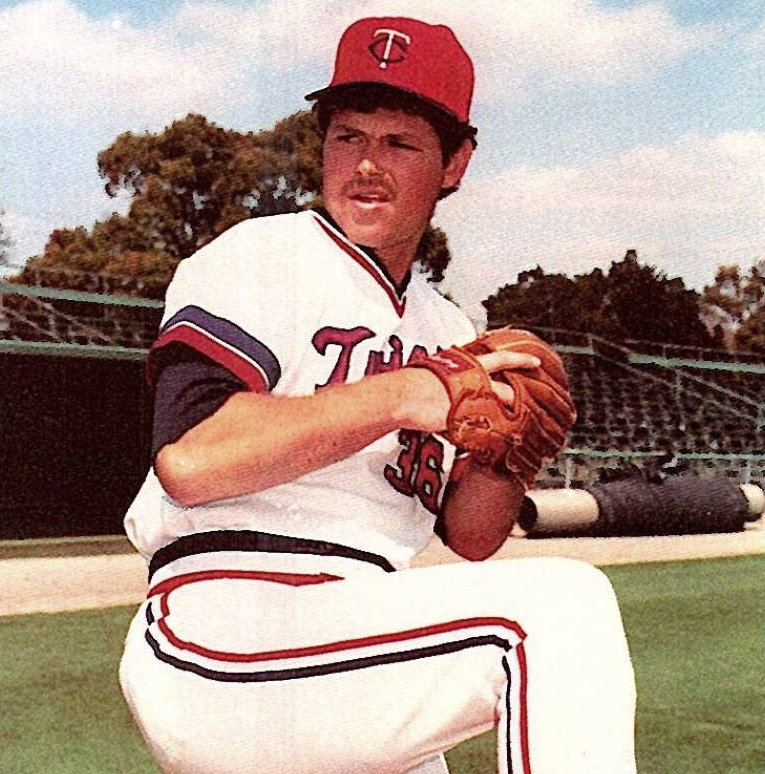
- Wardle with the Minnesota Twins c. 1985
- Pitcher
- Born: November 16, 1960 (age 65); Downey, California, U.S.
- Batted: Left Threw: Left

MLB debut
- August 30, 1984, for the Minnesota Twins

Last MLB appearance
- October 5, 1985, for the Cleveland Indians

MLB statistics
- Win–loss record: 8–9
- Earned run average: 6.13
- Strikeouts: 89
- Stats at Baseball Reference

Teams
- Minnesota Twins (1984–1985); Cleveland Indians (1985)

Curtis Ray Wardle (born November 16, 1960) is an American former Major League Baseball pitcher who played for two seasons.

Curtis pitched for the Minnesota Twins from 1984 to 1985 and the Cleveland Indians in 1985. One highlight of Wardle's brief major league career came on May 20, 1985. Wardle pitched a perfect 9th inning for his only major league save. It secured a 5-2 Twins victory over the Red Sox.

Wardle attended the University of California, Riverside, where he played college baseball for the Highlanders in 1981.
