= 1985 Major League Baseball All-Star Game =

1985 American baseball competition

	1	2	3	4	5	6	7	8	9	R	H	E
National League	0	1	1	0	2	0	0	0	2	6	9	1
American League	1	0	0	0	0	0	0	0	0	1	5	0
- Date: July 16, 1985
- Venue: Hubert H. Humphrey Metrodome
- City: Minneapolis
- Managers: Dick Williams (SD); Sparky Anderson (DET)
- MVP: LaMarr Hoyt (SD)
- Attendance: 54,960
- Ceremonial first pitch: Pete Rose and Nolan Ryan
- Television: NBC
- TV announcers: Vin Scully and Joe Garagiola
- Radio: CBS
- Radio announcers: Brent Musburger, Jerry Coleman and Johnny Bench

The 1985 Major League Baseball All-Star Game was the 56th playing of the game, annually played between the All-Stars of the National League and the All-Stars of the American League. The game was played on July 16, 1985, in the Hubert H. Humphrey Metrodome in Minneapolis, Minnesota, home of the Minnesota Twins.

== Roster ==
Players in italics have since been inducted into the National Baseball Hall of Fame.

=== Starters ===
==== National League ====
NL Batting Order

1. Tony Gwynn, OF, San Diego Padres
2. Tom Herr, 2B, St. Louis Cardinals
3. Steve Garvey, 1B, San Diego Padres
4. Dale Murphy, OF, Atlanta Braves
5. Darryl Strawberry, OF, New York Mets
6. Graig Nettles, 3B, San Diego Padres
7. Terry Kennedy, C, San Diego Padres (in place of Gary Carter)
8. Ozzie Smith, SS, St. Louis Cardinals
9. LaMarr Hoyt, P, San Diego Padres

==== American League ====
AL Batting Order

1. Rickey Henderson, OF, New York Yankees
2. Lou Whitaker, 2B, Detroit Tigers
3. George Brett, 3B, Kansas City Royals
4. Eddie Murray, 1B, Baltimore Orioles
5. Cal Ripken Jr., SS, Baltimore Orioles
6. Dave Winfield, OF, New York Yankees
7. Jim Rice, OF, Boston Red Sox
8. Carlton Fisk, C, Chicago White Sox (in place of Lance Parrish)
9. Jack Morris, P, Detroit Tigers

=== Pitchers ===
==== National League ====
- Joaquín Andújar, St. Louis Cardinals (did not attend)
- Ron Darling, New York Mets
- Scott Garrelts, San Francisco Giants
- Rich Gossage, San Diego Padres
- Dwight Gooden, New York Mets
- LaMarr Hoyt, San Diego Padres (starting pitcher)
- Jeff Reardon, Montreal Expos
- Nolan Ryan, Houston Astros
- Fernando Valenzuela, Los Angeles Dodgers

==== American League ====
- Bert Blyleven, Cleveland Indians
- Willie Hernández, Detroit Tigers
- Jay Howell, Oakland Athletics
- Jimmy Key, Toronto Blue Jays
- Donnie Moore, California Angels
- Jack Morris, Detroit Tigers (starting pitcher)
- Dan Petry, Detroit Tigers
- Dave Stieb, Toronto Blue Jays

=== Reserves ===
==== National League ====
- Tony Peña, C, Pittsburgh Pirates
- Ozzie Virgil Jr., C, Philadelphia Phillies
- Jack Clark, 1B, St. Louis Cardinals
- Pete Rose, 1B, Cincinnati Reds
- Ryne Sandberg, 2B, Chicago Cubs
- Garry Templeton, SS, San Diego Padres
- Tim Wallach, 3B, Montreal Expos
- José Cruz, OF, Houston Astros
- Pedro Guerrero, OF, Los Angeles Dodgers
- Willie McGee, OF, St. Louis Cardinals
- Dave Parker, OF, Cincinnati Reds
- Tim Raines, OF, Montreal Expos
- Glenn Wilson, OF, Philadelphia Phillies

==== American League ====
- Rich Gedman, C, Boston Red Sox
- Ernie Whitt, C, Toronto Blue Jays
- Cecil Cooper, 1B, Milwaukee Brewers
- Don Mattingly, 1B, New York Yankees
- Damaso Garcia, 2B, Toronto Blue Jays
- Alan Trammell, SS, Detroit Tigers
- Wade Boggs, 3B, Boston Red Sox
- Paul Molitor, 3B, Milwaukee Brewers
- Harold Baines, OF, Chicago White Sox
- Phil Bradley, OF, Seattle Mariners
- Tom Brunansky, OF, Minnesota Twins
- Gary Ward, OF, Texas Rangers

== Umpires ==
Position	Umpire
Home Plate	Larry McCoy (AL)
First Base	John Kibler (NL)
Second Base	Nick Bremigan (AL)
Third Base	Charlie Williams (NL)
Left Field	Drew Coble (AL)
Right Field	Randy Marsh (NL)

== Game summary ==
Tuesday, July 16, 1985 7:40 pm (CT) at Hubert H. Humphrey Metrodome in Minneapolis, Minnesota
Team	1	2	3	4	5	6	7	8	9	R	H	E
National League	0	1	1	0	2	0	0	0	2	6	9	1
American League	1	0	0	0	0	0	0	0	0	1	5	0
WP: LaMarr Hoyt (1-0) LP: Jack Morris (0-1)

The National League won the game 6–1, with the winning pitcher being LaMarr Hoyt of the San Diego Padres and the losing pitcher being Jack Morris of the Detroit Tigers. Hoyt also won the game's MVP award. The National League was managed by the Padres' Dick Williams, while the American League was managed by Sparky Anderson of the Tigers.

Williams was backed by coaches Jim Frey and Bob Lillis and Anderson was aided by coaches Bobby Cox and Dick Howser.

The teams' honorary captains each starred in the 1965 All-Star game, also held in Minnesota -- Harmon Killebrew for the AL, and Sandy Koufax for the NL. In the game two decades ago, Koufax earned the NL win, and Killebrew hit the AL's second home run.

Attendance was announced as 54,960.
