= 1985 Toronto Blue Jays season =

1985 Toronto Blue Jays
- American League East champions
- League: American League
- Division: East
- Ballpark: Exhibition Stadium
- City: Toronto
- Record: 99–62 (.615)
- Divisional place: 1st
- Owners: Labatt Breweries, Imperial Trust, Canadian Imperial Bank of Commerce
- General managers: Pat Gillick
- Managers: Bobby Cox
- Television: CFTO-TV 9 (Don Chevrier, Tony Kubek, Fergie Olver); The Sports Network (Ken Singleton, Tony Kubek, Fergie Olver)
- Radio: CJCL–AM 1430 (Jerry Howarth, Tom Cheek)

The 1985 Toronto Blue Jays season was the franchise's ninth season of Major League Baseball. It resulted in the Blue Jays finishing first in the American League East with a record of 99 wins and 62 losses. The win total of 99 is a franchise record, and the division title was the franchise's first. This was the first time the Blue Jays made the postseason.

Despite having the second-best record in Major League Baseball, the Blue Jays collapsed in the American League Championship Series to the eventual World Series champion Kansas City Royals, blowing a 3–1 series lead and losing in seven games.

== Offseason ==
=== Transactions ===
Transactions by the Toronto Blue Jays during the off-season before the 1985 season.

==== November 1984 ====
November 8	Cliff Johnson granted free agency.
November 21	Signed free agent Tom Filer from the Chicago Cubs to a contract.

==== December 1984 ====
December 3	Drafted Manny Lee from the Houston Astros in the 1984 MLB Rule 5 draft. Drafted Lou Thornton from the New York Mets in the 1984 MLB Rule 5 draft. Mike Morgan drafted by the Seattle Mariners in the 1984 MLB Rule 5 draft.
December 8	Acquired Bill Caudill from the Oakland Athletics for Dave Collins, Alfredo Griffin and cash.
December 22	Purchased Jeff Burroughs from the Oakland Athletics.

==== January 1985 ====
January 24	Chose Tom Henke from the Texas Rangers as a free agent compensation pick (Cliff Johnson signed with Rangers on December 5, 1984).
January 26	Acquired Gary Lavelle from the San Francisco Giants for Jim Gott, Jack McKnight and Augie Schmidt.

==== February 1985 ====
February 5	Signed free agent Gary Allenson from the Boston Red Sox to a contract.

==== March 1985 ====
March 4	Signed amateur free agent Francisco de la Rosa to a contract.

==== April 1985 ====
April 1	Released Bryan Clark. Released Roy Lee Jackson. Released Jeff Richardson. Acquired Len Matuszek from the Philadelphia Phillies for José Escobar, Dave Shipanoff and Ken Kinnard.
April 7	Player rights of Fred Manrique sold to the Montreal Expos.

== Regular season ==
- April 27, 1985: Willie Aikens hit a home run in the last at-bat of his career.
- July 9, 1985: In a game between the Blue Jays and the Mariners at Seattle, Buck Martinez executed a double play by tagging out two runners at home plate. In the third inning, Phil Bradley was on second when Gorman Thomas singled. Bradley was tagged out at home, on a throw from Jesse Barfield to Martinez. There was a collision between Bradley and Martinez – Martinez broke his ankle. Martinez was sitting on the ground in agony and threw the ball to third base in an attempt to tag out Gorman Thomas. The throw went into left field and Thomas ran towards home plate. Toronto left fielder George Bell threw the ball back to Martinez. He was still seated on the ground in pain but was able to tag Gorman Thomas for the out. Martinez tagged out both runners at home plate.
- Dave Stieb led the American League with a 2.48 ERA and pitched 26 consecutive scoreless innings.

=== Season standings ===
AL East
Team	W	L	Pct.	GB	Home	Road
Toronto Blue Jays	99	62	.615	—	54‍–‍26	45‍–‍36
New York Yankees	97	64	.602	2	58‍–‍22	39‍–‍42
Detroit Tigers	84	77	.522	15	44‍–‍37	40‍–‍40
Baltimore Orioles	83	78	.516	16	45‍–‍36	38‍–‍42
Boston Red Sox	81	81	.500	18½	43‍–‍37	38‍–‍44
Milwaukee Brewers	71	90	.441	28	40‍–‍40	31‍–‍50
Cleveland Indians	60	102	.370	39½	38‍–‍43	22‍–‍59

=== Record vs. opponents ===
1985 American League record Sources:
Team	BAL	BOS	CAL	CWS	CLE	DET	KC	MIL	MIN	NYY	OAK	SEA	TEX	TOR
Baltimore	—	5–8	7–5	8–4	8–5	6–7	6–6	9–4	6–6	1–12	7–5	6–6	10–2	4–8
Boston	8–5	—	5–7	4–8–1	8–5	6–7	5–7	5–8	7–5	5–8	8–4	6–6	5–7	9–4
California	5–7	7–5	—	8–5	8–4	8–4	4–9	9–3	9–4	3–9	6–7	9–4	9–4	5–7
Chicago	4–8	8–4–1	5–8	—	10–2	6–6	5–8	5–7	6–7	6–6	8–5	9–4	10–3	3–9
Cleveland	5–8	5–8	4–8	2–10	—	5–8	2–10	7–6	4–8	6–7	3–9	6–6	7–5	4–9
Detroit	7–6	7–6	4–8	6–6	8–5	—	5–7	9–4	3–9	9–3	8–4	5–7	7–5	6–7
Kansas City	6–6	7–5	9–4	8–5	10–2	7–5	—	8–4	7–6	5–7	8–5	3–10	6–7	7–5
Milwaukee	4–9	8–5	3–9	7–5	6–7	4–9	4–8	—	9–3	7–6	3–9	4–8	8–3	4–9
Minnesota	6–6	5–7	4–9	7–6	8–4	9–3	6–7	3–9	—	3–9	8–5	6–7	8–5	4–8
New York	12–1	8–5	9–3	6–6	7–6	3–9	7–5	6–7	9–3	—	7–5	9–3	8–4	6–7
Oakland	5–7	4–8	7–6	5–8	9–3	4–8	5–8	9–3	5–8	5–7	—	8–5	6–7	5–7
Seattle	6–6	6–6	4–9	4–9	6–6	7–5	10–3	8–4	7–6	3–9	5–8	—	6–7	2–10
Texas	2–10	7–5	4–9	3–10	5–7	5–7	7–6	3–8	5–8	4–8	7–6	7–6	—	3–9
Toronto	8–4	4–9	7–5	9–3	9–4	7–6	5–7	9–4	8–4	7–6	7–5	10–2	9–3	—

=== Transactions ===
Transactions for the Toronto Blue Jays during the 1985 regular season.

==== May 1985 ====
May 1	Signed amateur free agent William Suero to a contract.
May 9	Released Willie Aikens.
May 19	Re-signed free agent Willie Aikens.
May 31	Signed amateur free agent Pedro Muñoz to a contract.

==== June 1985 ====
June 22	Traded Mitch Webster to the Montreal Expos for a player to be named later (Cliff Young on September 10, 1985).

==== July 1985 ====
July 9	Acquired Al Oliver from the Los Angeles Dodgers for Len Matuszek.

==== August 1985 ====
August 24	Released Gary Allenson.
August 28	Acquired Cliff Johnson from the Texas Rangers for players to be named later (Matt Williams and Jeff Mays on August 29, 1985; and Greg Ferlenda on November 14, 1985).

==== September 1985 ====
September 1	Signed free agent Steve Nicosia from the Montreal Expos to a contract.
September 15	Signed amateur free agent Junior Félix to a contract.
September 17	Signed amateur free agent Francisco Cabrera to a contract.
September 28	Released Francisco de la Rosa.

=== Roster ===
1985 Toronto Blue Jays
Roster
Pitchers: 31 Jim Acker; 33 Doyle Alexander; 36 Bill Caudill; 55 John Cerutti; 18 Jim Clancy; 34 Stan Clarke; 25 Steve Davis; 49 Tom Filer; 50 Tom Henke; 22 Jimmy Key; 53 Dennis Lamp; 46 Gary Lavelle; 48 Luis Leal; 30 Ron Musselman; 37 Dave Stieb	Catchers: 38 Gary Allenson; 54 Jeff Hearron; 13 Buck Martinez; 35 Steve Nicosia; 12 Ernie Whitt; Infielders: 1 Tony Fernández; 23 Cecil Fielder; 7 Dámaso García; 17 Kelly Gruber; 16 Garth Iorg; 9 Rick Leach; 4 Manuel Lee; 5 Rance Mulliniks; 26 Willie Upshaw	Outfielders: 29 Jesse Barfield; 11 George Bell; 15 Lloyd Moseby; 21 Ron Shepherd; 28 Lou Thornton; 23 Mitch Webster; Other batters: 24 Willie Aikens; 44 Jeff Burroughs; 00 Cliff Johnson; 25 Len Matuszek; 0 Al Oliver	Manager: 6 Bobby Cox; Coaches: 43 Cito Gaston (Hitting); 42 Billy Smith (First base); 8 John Sullivan (Bullpen); 41 Al Widmar (Pitching); 3 Jimy Williams (Third base)

== Record vs. opponents ==
	Record			Games Left		
Opponent	Home	Road	Total	Home	Road	Total
AL East
Totals
AL West
Kansas City Royals	2–4	3–3	5–7	–	–	–
Totals	2–4	3–3	5–7	–	–	–
Grand Totals	54–26	45–36	99–62	–	–	–

Month	Games	Won	Lost	Pct.
April
May
June
July
August
September
October
Totals	161	99	62	.615

== Game log ==
=== Regular season ===
1985 regular season game log: 99–62 (home: 54–26; away: 45–36)
April: 13–7 (home: 5–4; away: 8–3)

#	Date	Time (ET)	Opponent	Score	Win	Loss	Save	Time of Game	Attendance	Record	Box/ Streak
1	April 8	2:35 p.m. EST	@ Royals	L 1–2	Black (1–0)	**Stieb** (0–1)	Quisenberry (1)	2:30	41,086	0–1	L1
2	April 10	8:35 p.m. EST	@ Royals	**W** 1–0 (10)	**Caudill** (1–0)	Beckwith (0–1)	**Lavelle** (1)	2:52	14,740	1–1	W1
3	April 11	8:35 p.m. EST	@ Royals	**W** 4–3 (10)	**Caudill** (2–0)	Quisenberry (0–1)	**Acker** (1)	3:14	17,798	2–1	W2
4	April 12	8:05 p.m. EST	@ Orioles	L 2–7	McGregor (1–0)	**Key** (0–1)	Stewart (2)	2:56	26,585	2–2	L1
5	April 13	7:35 p.m. EST	@ Orioles	L 7–8	Martinez (1–0)	**Caudill** (2–1)	–	3:08	28,529	2-3	L2
6	April 14	2:05 p.m. EST	@ Orioles	**W** 5–3	**Alexander** (1–0)	Boddicker (1–1)	**Acker** (2)	2:31	25,111	3–3	W1
7	April 16	1:35 p.m. EST	Rangers	L 4–9	Mason (1–1)	**Leal** (0–1)	Noles (1)	3:16	41,284	3–4	L1
8	April 17	1:35 p.m. EST	Rangers	**W** 3–1 (10)	**Caudill** (3–1)	Stewart (0–1)	–	3:00	15,472	4–4	W1
9	April 18	1:35 p.m. EST	Rangers	**W** 4–2	**Stieb** (1–1)	Tanana (0–2)	**Caudill** (1)	2:49	15,380	5–4	W2
10	April 19	7:35 p.m. EST	Orioles	**W** 6–5	**Alexander** (2–0)	Stewart (1–1)	**Caudill** (2)	2:51	20,213	6–4	W3
11	April 20	1:35 p.m. EST	Orioles	**W** 3–2	**Musselman** (1–0)	Martinez (1–1)	**Lavelle** (2)	2:37	40,451	7–4	W4
12	April 21	1:35 p.m. EST	Orioles	L 2–3	Martínez (1–1)	**Key** (0–2)	Martínez (1)	2:50	29,082	7–5	L1
13	April 22	7:35 p.m. EST	Royals	L 0–2	Leibrandt (2–0)	**Stieb** (1–2)	—	2:13	20,281	7–6	L2
14	April 23	7:35 p.m. EST	Royals	L 6–7	Beckwith (1–1)	**Caudill** (3–2)	Quisenberry (2)	2:46	18,491	7–7	L3
15	April 24	1:35 p.m. EST	Royals	**W** 10–2	**Leal** (1–1)	Saberhagen (1–2)	—	2:17	18,006	8–7	W1
16	April 26	8:35 p.m. EST	@ Rangers	**W** 6–5	**Lamp** (1–0)	Schmidt (0–1)	**Caudill** (3)	2:46	10,725	9–7	W2
17	April 27	8:35 p.m. EST	@ Rangers	**W** 9–8 (10)	**Acker** (1–0)	Stewart (0–2)	**Caudill** (4)	3:09	13,769	10–7	W3
18	April 28	3:05 p.m. EDT	@ Rangers	**W** 6–3	**Alexander** (3–0)	Mason (2–2)	–	2:29	11,324	11–7	W4
19	April 29	10:35 p.m. EDT	@ Athletics	**W** 2–1	**Leal** (2–1)	Krueger (2–2)	**Caudill** (5)	2:45	13,852	12–7	W5
20	April 30	10:35 p.m. EDT	@ Athletics	**W** 4–3	**Lamp** (2–0)	Howell (0–1)	**Acker** (3)	2:58	6,439	13–7	W6

May: 17–8 (home: 9–2; away: 8–6)

#	Date	Time (ET)	Opponent	Score	Win	Loss	Save	Time of Game	Attendance	Record	Box/ Streak
21	May 1	10:30 p.m. EDT	@ Angels	**W** 6–3	**Key** (1–2)	McCaskill (0–1)	–	2:34	24,112	14–7	W7
22	May 2	10:30 p.m. EDT	@ Angels	L 2–3	Clements (2–0)	**Stieb** (1–3)	–	2:45	23,824	14–8	L1
23	May 3	10:35 p.m. EDT	@ Mariners	**W** 5–4	**Alexander** (4–0)	Barojas (0–3)	**Caudill** (6)	2:41	12,370	15–8	W1
24	May 4	10:05 p.m. EDT	@ Mariners	L 1–9	Young (2–3)	**Leal** (2–2)	–	2:24	14,952	15–9	L1
25	May 5	4:35 p.m. EDT	@ Mariners	L 1–4	Langston (4–2)	**Clancy** (0–1)	–	2:15	11,500	15–10	L2
26	May 7	7:35 p.m. EDT	Athletics	**W** 10–1	**Stieb** (2–3)	Sutton (2–3)	–	2:55	21,292	16–10	W1
27	May 8	7:35 p.m. EDT	Athletics	L 4–6	McCatty (2–1)	**Alexander** (4–1)	Howell (8)	3:09	18,102	16–11	L1
28	May 10	7:35 p.m. EDT	Mariners	**W** 8–3	**Key** (2–2)	Langston (4–3)	**Acker** (4)	3:29	20,116	17–11	W1
29	May 11	1:35 p.m. EDT	Mariners	**W** 4–2	**Caudill** (4–2)	Young (2–4)	–	2:50	32,398	18–11	W2
30	May 12	1:35 p.m. EDT	Mariners	**W** 9–5	**Stieb** (3–3)	Beattie (1–4)	–	2:54	25,181	19–11	W3
31	May 14	7:35 p.m. EDT	Angels	**W** 6–3	**Alexander** (5–1)	Slaton (3–2)	**Caudill** (7)	2:42	22,445	20–11	W4
32	May 15	7:35 p.m. EDT	Angels	L 6–9	Moore (2–1)	**Caudill** (4–3)	–	3:00	18,119	20–12	L1
33	May 17	8:35 p.m. EDT	@ Twins	L 6–7 (11)	Filson (1–0)	**Leal** (2–3)	–	3:31	19,253	20–13	L2
34	May 18	2:15 p.m. EDT	@ Twins	**W** 3–1	**Clancy** (1–1)	Smithson (4–3)	**Acker** (5)	2:42	16,824	21-13	W1
35	May 19	2:15 p.m. EDT	@ Twins	L 2–8	Filson (2–0)	**Alexander** (5–2)	–	2:26	25,151	21–14	L1
36	May 20	1:35 p.m. EDT	White Sox	**W** 6–1	**Key** (3–2)	Seaver (4–2)	–	2:12	44,715	22–14	W1
37	May 21	7:35 p.m. EDT	White Sox	**W** 4–3	**Lavelle** (1–0)	James (1–1)	–	2:50	20,159	23–14	W2
38	May 22	7:35 p.m. EDT	White Sox	**W** 10–0	**Stieb** (4–3)	Dotson (2–2)	–	2:32	22,447	24–14	W3
39	May 23	7:35 p.m. EDT	@ Indians	**W** 6–5	**Lamp** (3–0)	Waddell (1–3)	**Caudill** (8)	3:09	4,333	25–14	W4
40	May 24	7:35 p.m. EDT	@ Indians	**W** 7–6	**Lamp** (4–0)	Creel (0–2)	**Lavelle** (3)	3:13	8,502	26–14	W5
41	May 25	1:35 p.m. EDT	@ Indians	**W** 10–7	**Musselman** (2–0)	Thompson (1–2)	**Acker** (6)	3:05	7,345	27–14	W6
42	May 26	1:35 p.m. EDT	@ Indians	**W** 6–5	**Lavelle** (2–0)	Creel (0–3)	**Caudill** (9)	3:09	13,255	28–14	W7
—	May 27		@ White Sox	**Postponed (Rain)** (Makeup date: August 23)							
43	May 28	8:30 p.m. EDT	@ White Sox	**W** 6–1	**Stieb** (5–3)	Dotson (2–3)	–	2:42	14,598	29–14	W8
44	May 29	8:30 p.m. EDT	@ White Sox	L 5–8	Burns (6–4)	**Clancy** (1–2)	James (8)	3:12	18,953	29–15	L1
45	May 31	7:35 p.m. EDT	Indians	**W** 7–2	**Alexander** (6–2)	Clark (1–1)	**Acker** (7)	2:55	24,166	30–15	W1

June: 16–13 (home: 11–5; away: 5–8)

#	Date	Time (ET)	Opponent	Score	Win	Loss	Save	Time of Game	Attendance	Record	Box/ Streak
46	June 1	1:35 p.m. EDT	Indians	**W** 8–3	**Key** (4–2)	Blyleven (3–6)	–	2:35	33,296	31–15	W2
47 (1)	June 2	1:35 p.m. EDT	Indians	L 4–5	Heaton (4–4)	**Stieb** (5–4)	Waddell (8)	2:33	–	31–16	L1
48 (2)	June 2	4:43 p.m. EDT	Indians	**W** 5–2	**Leal** (3–3)	Behenna (0–1)	**Acker** (8)	2:40	35,315	32–16	W1
49	June 4	7:35 p.m. EDT	Twins	**W** 9–2	**Clancy** (2–2)	Viola (6–5)	–	2:25	27,163	33–16	W2
50	June 5	7:35 p.m. EDT	Twins	**W** 5–0	**Alexander** (7–2)	Smithson (4–5)	–	2:44	26,087	34–16	W3
51	June 6	7:35 p.m. EDT	Tigers	**W** 2–0 (12)	**Acker** (2–0)	López (0–4)	–	3:25	36,384	35–16	W4
52	June 7	7:35 p.m. EDT	Tigers	**W** 9–2	**Stieb** (6–4)	Terrell (6–2)	–	2:49	42,455	36–16	W5
53	June 8	1:35 p.m. EDT	Tigers	L 1–10	O'Neal (1–0)	**Leal** (3–4)	–	2:22	44,484	36–17	L1
54	June 9	1:35 p.m. EDT	Tigers	L 3–8	Bair (1–0)	**Clancy** (2–3)	–	2:40	40,273	36–18	L2
55	June 10	8:20 p.m. EDT	@ Yankees	L 2–4	Shirley (1–1)	**Alexander** (7–3)	Righetti (11)	2:33	20,329	36–19	L3
56	June 11	8:00 p.m. EDT	@ Yankees	**W** 4–1 (11)	**Lamp** (5–0)	Fisher (2–1)	–	3:37	22,620	37–19	W1
57	June 12	8:00 p.m. EDT	@ Yankees	**W** 3–2 (10)	**Acker** (3–0)	Bordi (1–1)	–	3:18	25,129	38–19	W2
58	June 13	7:35 p.m. EDT	@ Red Sox	L 7–8	Trujillo (1–1)	**Lavelle** (2–1)	Stanley (8)	3:20	22,459	38–20	L1
59	June 14	7:35 p.m. EDT	@ Red Sox	L 1–4	Boyd (8–4)	**Clancy** (2–4)	–	2:56	33,809	38–21	L2
60	June 15	2:05 p.m. EDT	@ Red Sox	L 5–7	Stanley (2–2)	**Acker** (3–1)	–	2:47	35,664	38–22	L3
61	June 16	3:05 p.m. EDT	@ Red Sox	L 6–7	Crawford (4–2)	**Lavelle** (2–2)	–	3:16	27,700	38–23	L4
62	June 17	8:30 p.m. EDT	@ Brewers	L 1–2	Haas (6–3)	**Stieb** (6–5)	–	1:54	16,889	38–24	L5
63	June 18	8:30 p.m. EDT	@ Brewers	L 1–4	Burris (4–5)	**Leal** (3–5)	–	2:25	18,568	38–25	L6
64	June 19	2:30 p.m. EDT	@ Brewers	**W** 5–1	**Clancy** (3–4)	Vuckovich (2–5)	**Caudill** (10)	2:50	25,607	39–25	W1
65	June 20	7:35 p.m. EDT	Red Sox	**W** 6–5	**Acker** (4–1)	Stanley (2–3)	**Caudill** (11)	2:24	35,050	40–25	W2
66	June 21	7:35 p.m. EDT	Red Sox	**W** 7–2	**Key** (5–2)	Hurst (2–7)	–	2:37	36,252	41–25	W3
67	June 22	1:35 p.m. EDT	Red Sox	L 3–5	Stanley (3–3)	**Acker** (4–2)	–	2:52	42,117	41–26	L1
68	June 23	1:35 p.m. EDT	Red Sox	**W** 8–1	**Stieb** (7–5)	Kison (3–2)	–	2:29	34,128	42–26	W1
69	June 25	7:35 p.m. EDT	Brewers	**W** 7–1	**Clancy** (4–4)	Burris (4–6)	–	2:41	30,019	43–26	W2
70	June 26	7:35 p.m. EDT	Brewers	L 4–5	Gibson (6–4)	**Alexander** (7–4)	–	2:52	27,397	43–27	L1
71	June 27	7:35 p.m. EDT	Brewers	**W** 7–3	**Key** (6–2)	Higuera (4–5)	**Acker** (9)	2:40	28,228	44–27	W1
72	June 28	7:35 p.m. EDT	@ Tigers	**W** 2–0	**Stieb** (8–5)	Petry (9–6)	–	2:17	48,002	45–27	W2
73	June 29	7:35 p.m. EDT	@ Tigers	L 0–8	Terrell (9–3)	**Leal** (3–6)	–	2:27	47,965	45–28	L1
74	June 30	1:30 p.m. EDT	@ Tigers	**W** 6–5	**Lavelle** (3–2)	López (1–5)	**Lamp** (1)	3:14	44,377	46–28	W1

July: 18–10 (home: 10–4; away: 8–6)

#	Date	Time (ET)	Opponent	Score	Win	Loss	Save	Time of Game	Attendance	Record	Box/ Streak
75	July 1	1:35 p.m. EDT	Yankees	L 1–4	Cowley (7–3)	**Alexander** (7–5)	Righetti (14)	2:32	41,476	46–29	L1
76	July 2	7:35 p.m. EDT	Yankees	L 3–5	Whitson (4–6)	**Key** (6–3)	–	2:32	35,202	46–30	L2
77	July 3	12:35 p.m. EDT	Yankees	**W** 3–2 (10)	**Acker** (5–2)	Bordi (1–2)	–	3:23	40,376	47–30	W1
78	July 4	9:15 p.m. EDT	@ Athletics	L 2–3	Howell (8–3)	**Caudill** (4–4)	–	2:49	46,770	47–31	L1
79	July 5	10:35 p.m. EDT	@ Athletics	**W** 8–2	**Clancy** (5–4)	Krueger (5–8)	–	2:52	17,937	48–31	W1
80	July 6	4:05 p.m. EDT	@ Athletics	L 1–5	Sutton (8–5)	**Alexander** (7–6)	–	2:16	23,230	48–32	L1
81	July 7	4:05 p.m. EDT	@ Athletics	**W** 8–2	**Key** (7–3)	McCatty (4–4)	–	2:29	28,631	49–32	W1
82	July 8	10:35 p.m. EDT	@ Mariners	**W** 4–0	**Stieb** (9–5)	Moore (7–5)	–	2:51	20,817	50–32	W2
83	July 9	10:35 p.m. EDT	@ Mariners	**W** 9–4 (13)	**Musselman** (3–0)	Vande Berg (0–1)	–	4:27	10,393	51–32	W3
84	July 10	10:35 p.m. EDT	@ Mariners	**W** 11–1	**Clancy** (6–4)	Wills (4–2)	–	2:38	12,815	52–32	W4
85	July 11	10:30 p.m. EDT	@ Angels	**W** 5–3	**Alexander** (8–6)	Slaton (4–8)	**Lavelle** (4)	2:49	31,672	53–32	W5
86	July 12	10:30 p.m. EDT	@ Angels	L 3–5	McCaskill (5–5)	**Key** (7–4)	Moore (17)	2:43	35,870	53–33	L1
87	July 13	10:00 p.m. EDT	@ Angels	L 3–4	Witt (7–6)	**Lavelle** (3–3)	–	2:55	42,054	53–34	L2
88	July 14	4:00 p.m. EDT	@ Angels	L 3–5	Cliburn (4–2)	**Lavelle** (3–4)	–	2:53	35,306	53–35	L3
**56th All-Star Game in Minneapolis, MN**
89	July 18	7:35 p.m. EDT	Athletics	L 4–6	Ontiveros (1–1)	**Lavelle** (3–5)	Howell (19)	3:00	32,231	53-36	L4
90	July 19	7:35 p.m. EDT	Athletics	**W** 5–1	**Key** (8–4)	Sutton (9–6)	–	2:25	28,218	54-36	W1
91	July 20	1:35 p.m. EDT	Athletics	L 1–5	Birtsas (6–2)	**Stieb** (9–6)	Ontiveros (2)	2:24	35,187	54-37	L1
92	July 21	1:35 p.m. EDT	Athletics	**W** 11–4	**Lamp** (6–0)	Krueger (7–9)	–	2:38	36,109	55-37	W1
93	July 22	7:35 p.m. EDT	Mariners	**W** 3–1	**Filer** (1–0)	Langston (5–7)	**Caudill** (12)	2:37	25,110	56–37	W2
94	July 23	7:35 p.m. EDT	Mariners	**W** 4–2	**Alexander** (9–6)	Moore (8–6)	**Caudill** (13)	2:24	28,419	57–37	W3
95	July 24	7:35 p.m. EDT	Mariners	**W** 3–1	**Key** (9–4)	Young (7–11)	**Lavelle** (5)	2:22	26,163	58–37	W4
96	July 25	7:35 p.m. EDT	Angels	**W** 7–0	**Stieb** (10–6)	Witt (8–7)	–	2:28	32,083	59–37	W5
97	July 26	7:35 p.m. EDT	Angels	**W** 8–3	**Clancy** (7–4)	Lugo (3–3)	–	2:36	31,294	60–37	W6
98	July 27	1:35 p.m. EDT	Angels	**W** 8–3	**Filer** (2–0)	Mack (0–1)	**Acker** (10)	2:38	44,116	61–37	W7
99	July 28	1:35 p.m. EDT	Angels	**W** 5–1	**Alexander** (10–6)	McCaskill (6–7)	–	2:28	36,190	62–37	W8
100	July 29	7:35 p.m. EDT	@ Orioles	**W** 4–3 (10)	**Henke** (1–0)	Boddicker (10–11)	–	2:37	41,599	63–37	W9
101	July 30	7:35 p.m. EDT	@ Orioles	L 3–4 (10)	Aase (6–5)	**Lavelle** (3–6)	–	3:24	26,561	63–38	L1
102	July 31	7:35 p.m. EDT	@ Orioles	**W** 5–3	**Henke** (2–0)	Martínez (7–7)	–	3:22	32,044	64–38	W1

August: 17–10 (home: 7–3; away: 10–7)

#	Date	Time (ET)	Opponent	Score	Win	Loss	Save	Time of Game	Attendance	Record	Box/ Streak
103	August 1	7:35 p.m. EDT	@ Orioles	**W** 9–3	**Filer** (3–0)	Davis (5–7)	–	3:04	27,745	65–38	W2
104	August 2	7:35 p.m. EDT	Rangers	**W** 5–3	**Alexander** (11–6)	Cook (2–3)	**Henke** (1)	2:31	28,429	66–38	W3
105	August 3	1:35 p.m. EDT	Rangers	**W** 4–1	**Lamp** (7–0)	Welsh (2–3)	**Caudill** (14)	2:42	35,109	67–38	W4
106	August 4	1:35 p.m. EDT	Rangers	L 4–8	Hough (10–11)	**Stieb** (10–7)	Schmidt (4)	2:38	36,272	67–39	L1
—	August 6		Orioles	**Postponed (Strike)** (Makeup date: August 8)							
—	August 7		Orioles	**Cancelled (Strike)**							
107 (1)	August 8	5:35 p.m. EDT	Orioles	**W** 7–2	**Alexander** (12–6)	McGregor (9–9)	–	2:27	–	68–39	W1
108 (2)	August 8	8:37 p.m. EDT	Orioles	**W** 7–4	**Filer** (4–0)	Boddicker (10–13)	**Henke** (2)	2:34	40,104	69–39	W2
109	August 9	8:35 p.m. EDT	@ Royals	L 2–4	Black (8–11)	**Stieb** (10–8)	—	2:21	25,868	69–40	L1
110	August 10	8:35 p.m. EDT	@ Royals	L 3–4 (10)	Quisenberry (6–6)	**Caudill** (4–5)	—	2:54	34,448	69–41	L2
111	August 11	2:35 p.m. EDT	@ Royals	**W** 5–3 (10)	**Henke** (3–0)	Beckwith (1–5)	—	3:27	27,457	70–41	W1
112	August 12	8:35 p.m. EDT	@ Rangers	4–5	Henry (1–0)	**Caudill** (4–6)	–	2:52	10,829	70–42	L1
113	August 13	8:35 p.m. EDT	@ Rangers	**W** 5–3	**Filer** (5–0)	Russell (0–2)	**Henke** (3)	2:41	9,790	71–42	W1
114	August 14	8:35 p.m. EDT	@ Rangers	**W** 4–1	**Stieb** (11–8)	Hough (11–12)	–	2:35	10,494	72–42	W2
115	August 16	7:35 p.m. EDT	Royals	L 2–4	Leibrandt (11–6)	**Key** (9–5)	—	2:31	38,269	72–43	L1
116	August 17	1:20 p.m. EDT	Royals	L 2–4	Jackson (11–7)	**Alexander** (12–7)	Quisenberry (28)	2:21	42,313	72–44	L2
117	August 18	1:35 p.m. EDT	Royals	**W** 10–6	**Filer** (6–0)	Gubicza (9–7)	—	3:02	37,458	73–44	W1
118	August 19	7:35 p.m. EDT	@ Indians	L 3–5	Waddell (6–5)	**Stieb** (11–9)	–	2:26	6,280	73–45	L1
119	August 20	7:35 p.m. EDT	@ Indians	**W** 3–2	**Key** (10–5)	Smith (1–1)	**Henke** (4)	2:54	7,005	74–45	W1
120	August 21	7:35 p.m. EDT	@ Indians	L 2–5	Heaton (7–13)	**Alexander** (12–8)	–	2:25	6,342	74–46	L1
121 (1)	August 23	6:30 p.m. EDT	@ White Sox	**W** 6–3	**Filer** (7–0)	Burns (13–8)	**Henke** (5)	2:48	–	75–46	W1
122 (2)	August 23	9:23 p.m. EDT	@ White Sox	**W** 10–3	**Acker** (6–2)	Nelson (7–8)	–	2:59	22,021	76–46	W2
123	August 24	7:00 p.m. EDT	@ White Sox	**W** 6–3	**Stieb** (12–9)	Seaver (12–9)	**Henke** (6)	2:49	26,113	77–46	W3
124	August 25	2:30 p.m. EDT	@ White Sox	L 3–5	Bannister (6–11)	**Key** (10–6)	James (22)	2:52	22,529	77–47	L1
125	August 26	8:35 p.m. EDT	@ Twins	**W** 4–3	**Alexander** (13–8)	Blyleven (12–13)	**Henke** (7)	2:34	13,395	78–47	W1
126	August 27	8:35 p.m. EDT	@ Twins	**W** 8–0	**Davis** (1–0)	Viola (13–11)	–	2:36	12,780	79–47	W2
127	August 28	1:15 p.m. EDT	@ Twins	L 5–6 (10)	Filson (4–5)	**Henke** (3–1)	–	3:12	12,327	79–48	L1
128	August 30	7:35 p.m. EDT	White Sox	**W** 5–3	**Key** (11–6)	Bannister (6–12)	**Henke** (8)	2:39	33,254	80–48	W1
129	August 31	1:35 p.m. EDT	White Sox	**W** 6–2	**Lavelle** (4–6)	Davis (1–2)	–	2:40	36,153	81–48	W2

September: 17–9 (home: 11–6; away: 6–3)

#	Date	Time (ET)	Opponent	Score	Win	Loss	Save	Time of Game	Attendance	Record	Box/ Streak
130	September 1	1:35 p.m. EDT	White Sox	L 1–4	Burns (15–8)	**Davis** (1–1)	–	2:55	44,182	81–49	L1
131	September 2	1:35 p.m. EDT	Indians	**W** 3–2	**Stieb** (13–9)	Wardle (6–6)	**Henke** (9)	2:40	31,239	82–49	W1
132	September 4	7:35 p.m. EDT	Indians	L 4–5	Clark (2–3)	**Henke** (3–2)	Thompson (5)	2:48	25,361	82–50	L1
133	September 5	7:35 p.m. EDT	Twins	**W** 7–0	**Alexander** (14–8)	Blyleven (13–14)	–	2:07	26,584	83–50	W1
134	September 6	7:35 p.m. EDT	Twins	**W** 8–3	**Davis** (2–1)	Viola (13–13)	–	2:57	26,440	84–50	W2
135	September 7	1:35 p.m. EDT	Twins	L 3–6	Smithson (14–11)	**Stieb** (13–10)	–	2:22	30,368	84–51	L1
136	September 8	1:35 p.m. EDT	Twins	**W** 10–9	**Lamp** (8–0)	Portugal (1–2)	**Lavelle** (6)	2:46	28,221	85–51	W1
137	September 9	7:35 p.m. EDT	Tigers	**W** 5–3	**Key** (12–6)	Mahler (0–1)	**Henke** (10)	2:34	31,153	86–51	W2
138	September 10	7:35 p.m. EDT	Tigers	**W** 2–1	**Alexander** (15–8)	Morris (14–10)	–	2:39	31,228	87–51	W3
139	September 11	7:35 p.m. EDT	Tigers	**W** 3–2	**Lamp** (9–0)	Terrell (13–9)	**Henke** (11)	2:48	31,269	88–51	W4
140	September 12	8:00 p.m. EDT	@ Yankees	L 5–7	Guidry (19–5)	**Lavelle** (4–7)	Fisher (12)	2:54	52,141	88–52	L1
141	September 13	8:00 p.m. EDT	@ Yankees	**W** 3–2	**Lavelle** (5–7)	Niekro (15–10)	**Henke** (12)	3:13	53,303	89–52	W1
142	September 14	8:00 p.m. EDT	@ Yankees	**W** 7–4	**Key** (13–6)	Bordi (5–7)	–	2:51	54,367	90–52	W2
143	September 15	2:00 p.m. EDT	@ Yankees	**W** 8–5	**Alexander** (16–8)	Whitson (10–8)	–	3:13	54,699	91–52	W3
144	September 17	7:35 p.m. EDT	@ Red Sox	L 5–6	Boyd (14–11)	**Stieb** (13–11)	Crawford (10)	2:53	17,274	91–53	L1
145	September 18	7:35 p.m. EDT	@ Red Sox	L 1–13	Nipper (9–11)	**Clancy** (7–5)	–	2:49	17,598	91–54	L2
146	September 20	7:35 p.m. EDT	Brewers	**W** 7–5	**Key** (14–6)	Cocanower (4–7)	**Lavelle** (7)	2:28	31,442	92–54	W1
147	September 21	1:35 p.m. EDT	Brewers	**W** 2–1 (14)	**Lamp** (10–0)	Darwin (7–18)	–	4:14	33,502	93–54	W2
148	September 22	1:35 p.m. EDT	Brewers	L 1–2	Higuera (14–7)	**Stieb** (13–12)	–	2:26	38,155	93–55	L1
149	September 23	7:35 p.m. EDT	Brewers	**W** 5–1	**Clancy** (8–5)	Leary (1–2)	**Henke** (13)	2:25	26,282	94–55	W1
150	September 24	7:35 p.m. EDT	Red Sox	**W** 6–2	**Lamp** (11–0)	Nipper (9–12)	–	2:48	29,815	95–55	W2
151	September 25	7:35 p.m. EDT	Red Sox	L 2–4 (13)	Crawford (6–4)	**Cerutti** (0–1)	Lollar (1)	4:33	30,542	95–56	L1
152	September 26	7:35 p.m. EDT	Red Sox	L 1–4	Sellers (2–0)	**Alexander** (16–9)	–	2:09	30,443	95–57	L2
153	September 27	8:30 p.m. EDT	@ Brewers	**W** 5–1	**Stieb** (14–12)	Higuera (14–8)	**Lamp** (2)	2:54	17,050	96–57	W1
154	September 28	2:30 p.m. EDT	@ Brewers	**W** 6–1	**Clancy** (9–5)	Leary (1–3)	**Lavelle** (8)	2:27	9,542	97–57	W2
155	September 29	2:30 p.m. EDT	@ Brewers	**W** 13–5	**Acker** (7–2)	Burris (9–13)	–	2:59	8,822	98–57	W3

October: 1–5 (home: 1–2; away: 0–3)

#	Date	Time (ET)	Opponent	Score	Win	Loss	Save	Time of Game	Attendance	Record	Box/ Streak
156	October 1	7:35 p.m. EDT	@ Tigers	L 1–6	Tanana (11–14)	**Alexander** (16–10)	–	2:54	19,040	98–58	L1
157	October 2	7:35 p.m. EDT	@ Tigers	L 2–4	Morris (16–11)	**Stieb** (14–13)	Cary (2)	2:15	19,802	98-59	L2
158	October 3	7:35 p.m. EDT	@ Tigers	L 0–2	Terrell (15–10)	**Clancy** (9–6)	–	2:16	23,381	98–60	L3
159	October 4	7:35 p.m. EDT	Yankees	L 3–4	Scurry (1–0)	**Henke** (3–3)	Righetti (29)	2:55	47,686	98–61	L4
160	October 5	1:35 p.m. EDT	Yankees	**W** 5–1	**Alexander** (17–10)	Cowley (12–6)	–	2:38	44,608	99–61	W1
161	October 6	1:35 p.m. EDT	Yankees	L 0–8	Niekro (16–12)	**Cerutti** (0–2)	–	2:25	44,422	99–62	L1

*An MLB Players strike forced the cancellation of all regular season games on August 6 and 7. Most games were made up later in the season.
Legend: = Win = Loss = Postponement
Bold = Blue Jays team member

=== Postseason Game log ===
1985 Postseason game log: 3–4 (home: 2–2; away: 1–2)
AL Championship Series: vs. Kansas City Royals 3–4 (home: 2–2; away: 1–2)

#	Date	Time (ET)	Opponent	Score	Win	Loss	Save	Time of Game	Attendance	Series	Box/ Streak
1	October 8	8:30 p.m. EDT	Royals	**W** 6–1	**Stieb** (1–0)	Leibrandt (0–1)	—	2:24	39,115	TOR 1–0	W1
2	October 9	3:05 p.m. EDT	Royals	**W** 6–5 (10)	**Henke** (1–0)	Quisenberry (0–1)	—	3:39	34,029	TOR 2–0	W2
3	October 11	8:15 p.m. EDT	@ Royals	L 5–6	Farr (1–0)	**Clancy** (0–1)	—	2:51	40,224	TOR 2–1	L1
4	October 12	8:15 p.m. EDT	@ Royals	**W** 3–1	**Henke** (2–0)	Leibrandt (0–2)	—	3:02	41,112	TOR 3–1	W1
5	October 13	4:35 p.m. EDT	@ Royals	L 0–2	Jackson (1–0)	**Key** (0–1)	—	2:21	40,046	TOR 3–2	L1
6	October 15	8:15 p.m. EDT	Royals	L 3–5	Gubicza (1–0)	**Alexander** (0–1)	Quisenberry (1)	3:12	37,557	TIE 3–3	L2
7	October 16	8:15 p.m. EDT	Royals	L 2–6	Leibrandt (1–2)	**Stieb** (1–1)	—	2:49	32,084	KC 4–3	L3

Legend: = Win = Loss = Postponement
Bold = Blue Jays team member

== Player stats ==
= Indicates team leader

=== Batting ===
==== Starters by position ====
Note: Pos = Position; G = Games played; AB = At bats; H = Hits; Avg. = Batting average; HR = Home runs; RBI = Runs batted in

Pos	Player	G	AB	H	Avg.	HR	RBI
C	Ernie Whitt	139	412	101	.245	19	64
1B	Willie Upshaw	148	501	138	.275	15	65
2B	Dámaso García	146	600	169	.282	8	65
3B	Rance Mulliniks	129	366	108	.295	10	57
SS	Tony Fernández	161	564	163	.289	2	51
LF	George Bell	157	607	167	.275	28	95
CF	Lloyd Moseby	152	584	151	.259	18	70
RF	Jesse Barfield	155	539	156	.289	27	84
DH	Jeff Burroughs	86	191	49	.257	6	28

==== Other batters ====
Note: G = Games played; AB = At bats; H = Hits; Avg. = Batting average; HR = Home runs; RBI = Runs batted in

Player	G	AB	H	Avg.	HR	RBI
Garth Iorg	131	288	90	.313	7	37
Al Oliver	61	187	47	.251	5	23
Len Matuszek	62	151	32	.212	2	15
Buck Martinez	42	99	16	.162	4	14
Cecil Fielder	30	74	23	.311	4	16
Cliff Johnson	24	73	20	.274	1	10
Lou Thornton	56	72	17	.236	1	8
Manuel Lee	64	40	8	.200	0	0
Rick Leach	16	35	7	.200	0	1
Ron Shepherd	38	35	4	.114	0	1
Gary Allenson	14	34	4	.118	0	3
Willie Aikens	11	20	4	.200	1	5
Steve Nicosia	6	15	4	.267	0	1
Kelly Gruber	5	13	3	.231	0	1
Jeff Hearron	4	7	1	.143	0	0
Mitch Webster	4	1	0	.000	0	0

=== Pitching ===
= Indicates league leader

==== Starting pitchers ====
Note: G = Games pitched; IP = Innings pitched; W = Wins; L = Losses; ERA = Earned run average; SO = Strikeouts

Player	G	IP	W	L	ERA	SO
Dave Stieb	36	265.0	14	13	2.48	167
Doyle Alexander	36	260.2	17	10	3.45	142
Jimmy Key	35	212.2	14	6	3.00	85
Jim Clancy	23	128.2	9	6	3.78	66
Luis Leal	15	67.1	3	6	5.75	33
Tom Filer	11	48.2	7	0	3.88	24

==== Other pitchers ====
Note: G = Games pitched; IP = Innings pitched; W = Wins; L = Losses; ERA = Earned run average; SO = Strikeouts

Player	G	IP	W	L	ERA	SO
Ron Musselman	25	52.1	3	0	4.47	29
Steve Davis	10	28.0	2	1	3.54	22
John Cerutti	4	6.2	0	2	5.40	5

==== Relief pitchers ====
Note: G = Games pitched; IP = Innings pitched; W = Wins; L = Losses; SV = Saves; ERA = Earned run average; SO = Strikeouts

Player	G	IP	W	L	SV	ERA	SO
Bill Caudill	67	69.1	4	6	14	2.99	46
Gary Lavelle	69	72.2	5	7	8	3.10	50
Jim Acker	61	86.1	7	2	10	3.23	42
Dennis Lamp	53	105.2	11	0	2	3.32	68
Tom Henke	28	40.0	3	3	13	2.03	42
Stan Clarke	4	4.0	0	0	0	4.50	2

== ALCS ==
=== Game 1 ===
October 8, Exhibition Stadium

Team	1	2	3	4	5	6	7	8	9	R	H	E
Kansas City	0	0	0	0	0	0	0	0	1	1	5	1
Toronto	0	2	3	1	0	0	0	0	X	6	11	0
W: Dave Stieb (1–0) L: Charlie Leibrandt (0–1)
HRs: None

=== Game 2 ===
October 9, Exhibition Stadium

Team	1	2	3	4	5	6	7	8	9	10	R	H	E
Kansas City	0	0	2	1	0	0	0	0	1	1	5	10	3
Toronto	0	0	0	1	0	2	0	1	0	2	6	10	0
W: Tom Henke (1–0) L: Dan Quisenberry (0–1)
HRs: KCR: Willie Wilson (1) Pat Sheridan (1)

=== Game 3 ===
October 11, Royals Stadium

Team	1	2	3	4	5	6	7	8	9	R	H	E
Toronto	0	0	0	0	5	0	0	0	0	5	13	1
Kansas City	1	0	0	1	1	2	0	1	X	6	10	1
W: Steve Farr (1–0) L: Jim Clancy (0–1)
HRs: KCR – George Brett 2 (2) Jim Sundberg (1) TOR: Jesse Barfield (1) Rance Mulliniks (1)

=== Game 4 ===
October 12, Royals Stadium

Team	1	2	3	4	5	6	7	8	9	R	H	E
Toronto	0	0	0	0	0	0	0	0	3	3	7	0
Kansas City	0	0	0	0	0	1	0	0	0	1	2	0
W: Tom Henke (2–0) L: Charlie Leibrandt (0–2)
HRs: None

=== Game 5 ===
October 13, Royals Stadium

Team	1	2	3	4	5	6	7	8	9	R	H	E
Toronto	0	0	0	0	0	0	0	0	0	0	8	0
Kansas City	1	1	0	0	0	0	0	0	X	2	8	0
W: Danny Jackson (1–0) L: Jimmy Key (0–1)
HRs: None

=== Game 6 ===
October 15, Exhibition Stadium

Team	1	2	3	4	5	6	7	8	9	R	H	E
Kansas City	1	0	1	0	1	2	0	0	0	5	8	1
Toronto	1	0	1	0	0	1	0	0	0	3	8	2
W: Mark Gubicza (1–0) L: Doyle Alexander (0–1) S: Dan Quisenberry (1)
HRs: KCR – George Brett (3)

=== Game 7 ===
October 16, Exhibition Stadium

Team	1	2	3	4	5	6	7	8	9	R	H	E
Kansas City	0	1	0	1	0	4	0	0	0	6	8	0
Toronto	0	0	0	0	1	0	0	0	1	2	8	1
W: Charlie Leibrandt (1–2) L: Dave Stieb (1-1)
HRs: KCR – Pat Sheridan (2)

== Awards and honours ==
- Jesse Barfield, American League Leader in Outfield Assists (22)
- George Bell, Silver Slugger Award
- Bobby Cox, American League Manager of the Year Award
- Bobby Cox, The Sporting News Manager of the Year Award
- Dave Stieb, Pitcher of the Month Award, May
- Dave Stieb, American League ERA Champion, 2.48

All-Star Game

- Dámaso García, second base
- Jimmy Key, pitcher
- Dave Stieb, pitcher
- Ernie Whitt, catcher

== Farm system ==
Level	Team	League	Manager
AAA	Syracuse Chiefs	International League	Doug Ault
AA	Knoxville Blue Jays	Southern League	John McLaren
A	Kinston Blue Jays	Carolina League	Grady Little
A	Florence Blue Jays	South Atlantic League	Héctor Torres
Rookie	GCL Blue Jays	Gulf Coast League	Rocket Wheeler
Rookie	Medicine Hat Blue Jays	Pioneer League	Mike Young

LEAGUE CHAMPIONS: Florence
