= 1985 New York Yankees season =

Season for the Major League Baseball team the New York Yankees

1985 New York Yankees
- League: American League
- Division: East
- Ballpark: Yankee Stadium
- City: New York City
- Record: 97-64 (.602)
- Owners: George Steinbrenner
- General managers: Clyde King
- Managers: Yogi Berra, Billy Martin
- Television: WPIX–TV 11 (Phil Rizzuto, Bill White, Spencer Ross); SportsChannel NY (Mel Allen, Mickey Mantle, others from WPIX)
- Radio: WABC–AM 770 (Frank Messer, Phil Rizzuto, Bill White, John Gordon)

The 1985 New York Yankees season was the 83rd season for the Yankees. The team only played 161 games, came in second place in the American League East with a record of 97–64, and finished 2 games behind the Toronto Blue Jays. The Yankees did not qualify for the postseason. New York was managed by Yogi Berra and Billy Martin. The Yankees played at Yankee Stadium.

== Offseason ==
- November 5, 1984: Matt Keough was released by the Yankees.
- December 4, 1984: Ray Fontenot and Brian Dayett were traded by the Yankees to the Chicago Cubs for Ron Hassey, Porfi Altamirano, Rich Bordi, and Henry Cotto.
- December 5, 1984: Rick Cerone was traded by the Yankees to the Atlanta Braves for Brian Fisher.
- December 5, 1984: Stan Javier, Jay Howell, José Rijo, Eric Plunk, and Tim Birtsas were traded by the Yankees to the Oakland Athletics for Rickey Henderson, Bert Bradley and cash.
- December 20, 1984: Steve Kemp, Tim Foli, and cash were traded by the Yankees to the Pittsburgh Pirates for Jay Buhner, Dale Berra and Alfonso Pulido. Berra became the first player since 1925, when Earle Mack played for his father Connie Mack for the Philadelphia Athletics, to play for his father as manager.
- December 27, 1984: Ed Whitson was signed as a free agent by the Yankees.
- February 27, 1985: Toby Harrah was traded by the Yankees to the Texas Rangers for Billy Sample and a player to be named later. The Rangers completed the deal by sending Eric Dersin (minors) to the Yankees on July 14.

== Regular season ==
- Rickey Henderson set a new club record by stealing 80 bases in one season. The previous mark had stood since 1914.

Henderson also scored 146 runs. It was the most in the Major Leagues since Ted Williams scored 150 runs in 1949. In addition, Rickey Henderson became the first player since Lou Gehrig in 1936 to amass more runs in a season than games played.

- Don Mattingly became the first Yankee since Joe DiMaggio to have back to back 200 hit seasons.
- Mattingly's 48 doubles were the most since Lou Gehrig hit 52 in 1927.
- Mattingly was the AL MVP and RBI leader with 145. Mattingly hit for a .324 average with 35 home runs.
- Dave Winfield became the first Yankee since Yogi Berra to achieve four straight 100 RBI seasons. Berra did it from 1953 to 1956.
- On April 28, the Yankees fired Yogi Berra as manager 16 games into the season, only hours after being swept by the Chicago White Sox in a three-game series at Comiskey Park. Owner George Steinbrenner did not fire Berra personally, but instead dispatched general manager Clyde King to deliver the news. Berra was replaced by Billy Martin, whom he replaced as manager after the 1983 season. It became the fourth of Martin's five stints as Yankee skipper. Berra vowed after the slight to never again set foot in Yankee Stadium as long as Steinbrenner owned the team
- On September 22, while at a hotel bar in Baltimore, Maryland, pitcher Ed Whitson broke manager Billy Martin's arm after a heated argument that spread to other parts of the hotel. Whitson's Yankee tenure was also memorable for constantly being heckled and booed during home games.
- On October 5, the Yankees entered the next-to-last game of the season against the division-leading Toronto Blue Jays trailing them by two games. However, the Jays, led by pitcher Doyle Alexander, triumphed 5–1, clinching their first division title in franchise history.
- On October 6, Phil Niekro shut out the Blue Jays 8-0 for his 300th major league win. He did not throw his trademark knuckleball until the final pitch of the game, striking out Jeff Burroughs.

=== Season standings ===
AL East
| Team | W | L | Pct. | GB | Home | Road |
|---|---|---|---|---|---|---|
| Toronto Blue Jays | 99 | 62 | .615 | — | 54‍–‍26 | 45‍–‍36 |
| New York Yankees | 97 | 64 | .602 | 2 | 58‍–‍22 | 39‍–‍42 |
| Detroit Tigers | 84 | 77 | .522 | 15 | 44‍–‍37 | 40‍–‍40 |
| Baltimore Orioles | 83 | 78 | .516 | 16 | 45‍–‍36 | 38‍–‍42 |
| Boston Red Sox | 81 | 81 | .500 | 18½ | 43‍–‍37 | 38‍–‍44 |
| Milwaukee Brewers | 71 | 90 | .441 | 28 | 40‍–‍40 | 31‍–‍50 |
| Cleveland Indians | 60 | 102 | .370 | 39½ | 38‍–‍43 | 22‍–‍59 |

=== Record vs. opponents ===
1985 American League record Sources:
| Team | BAL | BOS | CAL | CWS | CLE | DET | KC | MIL | MIN | NYY | OAK | SEA | TEX | TOR |
|---|---|---|---|---|---|---|---|---|---|---|---|---|---|---|
| Baltimore | — | 5–8 | 7–5 | 8–4 | 8–5 | 6–7 | 6–6 | 9–4 | 6–6 | 1–12 | 7–5 | 6–6 | 10–2 | 4–8 |
| Boston | 8–5 | — | 5–7 | 4–8–1 | 8–5 | 6–7 | 5–7 | 5–8 | 7–5 | 5–8 | 8–4 | 6–6 | 5–7 | 9–4 |
| California | 5–7 | 7–5 | — | 8–5 | 8–4 | 8–4 | 4–9 | 9–3 | 9–4 | 3–9 | 6–7 | 9–4 | 9–4 | 5–7 |
| Chicago | 4–8 | 8–4–1 | 5–8 | — | 10–2 | 6–6 | 5–8 | 5–7 | 6–7 | 6–6 | 8–5 | 9–4 | 10–3 | 3–9 |
| Cleveland | 5–8 | 5–8 | 4–8 | 2–10 | — | 5–8 | 2–10 | 7–6 | 4–8 | 6–7 | 3–9 | 6–6 | 7–5 | 4–9 |
| Detroit | 7–6 | 7–6 | 4–8 | 6–6 | 8–5 | — | 5–7 | 9–4 | 3–9 | 9–3 | 8–4 | 5–7 | 7–5 | 6–7 |
| Kansas City | 6–6 | 7–5 | 9–4 | 8–5 | 10–2 | 7–5 | — | 8–4 | 7–6 | 5–7 | 8–5 | 3–10 | 6–7 | 7–5 |
| Milwaukee | 4–9 | 8–5 | 3–9 | 7–5 | 6–7 | 4–9 | 4–8 | — | 9–3 | 7–6 | 3–9 | 4–8 | 8–3 | 4–9 |
| Minnesota | 6–6 | 5–7 | 4–9 | 7–6 | 8–4 | 9–3 | 6–7 | 3–9 | — | 3–9 | 8–5 | 6–7 | 8–5 | 4–8 |
| New York | 12–1 | 8–5 | 9–3 | 6–6 | 7–6 | 3–9 | 7–5 | 6–7 | 9–3 | — | 7–5 | 9–3 | 8–4 | 6–7 |
| Oakland | 5–7 | 4–8 | 7–6 | 5–8 | 9–3 | 4–8 | 5–8 | 9–3 | 5–8 | 5–7 | — | 8–5 | 6–7 | 5–7 |
| Seattle | 6–6 | 6–6 | 4–9 | 4–9 | 6–6 | 7–5 | 10–3 | 8–4 | 7–6 | 3–9 | 5–8 | — | 6–7 | 2–10 |
| Texas | 2–10 | 7–5 | 4–9 | 3–10 | 5–7 | 5–7 | 7–6 | 3–8 | 5–8 | 4–8 | 7–6 | 7–6 | — | 3–9 |
| Toronto | 8–4 | 4–9 | 7–5 | 9–3 | 9–4 | 7–6 | 5–7 | 9–4 | 8–4 | 7–6 | 7–5 | 10–2 | 9–3 | — |

=== Notable transactions ===
- June 3, 1985: Shane Turner was drafted by the Yankees in the 6th round of the 1985 Major League Baseball draft.
- August 24, 1985: Jim Leyritz was signed by the Yankees as an amateur free agent.
- September 13, 1985: Bernie Williams was signed by the Yankees as an amateur free agent.
- September 15, 1985: Jim Deshaies and players to be named later were traded by the Yankees to the Houston Astros for Joe Niekro, who joined his brother Phil Niekro in the rotation. The Yankees completed the deal by sending Neder Horta (minors) to the Astros on September 24 and Dody Rather (minors) to the Astros on January 11, 1986.

=== Roster ===
1985 New York Yankees
Roster
| Pitchers: 26,53 Neil Allen; 36 Mike Armstrong; 43 Rich Bordi; 50 Marty Bystrom; 39 Don Cooper; 41 Joe Cowley; 54 Brian Fisher; 49 Ron Guidry; 26 John Montefusco; 48 Dale Murray; 26 Joe Niekro; 35 Phil Niekro; 45 Dennis Rasmussen; 19 Dave Righetti; 47 Rod Scurry; 29 Bob Shirley; 38 Ed Whitson | Catchers: 34 Scott Bradley; 52 Juan Espino; 12 Ron Hassey; 27 Butch Wynegar; Infielders: 2 Dale Berra; 55 Juan Bonilla; 56 Rex Hudler; 23 Don Mattingly; 20 Bob Meacham; 6 Mike Pagliarulo; 30 Willie Randolph; 18 Andre Robertson; 13 Keith Smith | Outfielders: 46 Henry Cotto; 33 Ken Griffey; 24 Rickey Henderson; 17 Víctor Mata; 22 Omar Moreno; 21 Dan Pasqua; 11 Billy Sample; 31 Dave Winfield; Other batters: 25 Don Baylor | Manager: 8 Yogi Berra; 1 Billy Martin; Coaches: 52 Mark Connor (Pitching); 42 Doug Holmquist (First base); 48 Willie Horton (Hitting); 42 Stump Merrill (First base); 40 Gene Michael (Third base); 28 Bill Monbouquette (Pitching); 14 Lou Piniella (Hitting); 51 Dom Scala (Bullpen catcher); 44 Jeff Torborg (Bullpen) |

== Game log ==
=== Regular season ===
1985 regular season game log: 97–64 (Home: 58–22; Away: 39–42)
April: 6–12 (Home: 4–4; Away: 2–8)

| # | Date | Time (ET) | Opponent | Score | Win | Loss | Save | Time of Game | Attendance | Record | Box/ Streak |
|---|---|---|---|---|---|---|---|---|---|---|---|
| 1 | April 8 | 2:05 p.m. EST | @ Red Sox | L 2–9 | Boyd (1–0) | **Niekro** (0–1) | – | 2:33 | 34,282 | 0–1 | L1 |
| 2 | April 10 | 2:05 p.m. EST | @ Red Sox | L 5–14 | Hurst (1–0) | **Whitson** (0–1) | – | 2:56 | 19,615 | 0–2 | L2 |
| 3 | April 11 | 2:05 p.m. EST | @ Red Sox | L 4–6 | Clemens (1–0) | **Rasmussen** (0–1) | Stanley (1) | 3:00 | 19,060 | 0–3 | L3 |
| 4 | April 13 | 2:05 p.m. EST | @ Indians | **W** 6–3 | **Guidry** (1–0) | Blyleven (0–1) | **Righetti** (1) | 2:59 | 61,978 | 1–3 | W1 |
| 5 | April 14 | 1:35 p.m. EST | @ Indians | **W** 2–1 | **Niekro** (1–1) | Waddell (0–1) | **Righetti** (2) | 2:44 | 12,085 | 2–3 | W2 |
| 6 | April 16 | 2:00 p.m. EST | White Sox | **W** 5–4 | **Righetti** (1–0) | Spillner (0–1) | – | 3:08 | 53,019 | 3–3 | W3 |
| 7 | April 18 | 1:00 p.m. EST | White Sox | **W** 3–2 | **Niekro** (1–1) | Bannister (0–2) | **Righetti** (3) | 2:51 | 15,126 | 4–3 | W4 |
| 8 | April 19 | 8:00 p.m. EST | Indians | L 1–2 | Heaton (1–0) | **Guidry** (1–1) | Waddell (2) | 2:45 | 21,229 | 4–4 | L1 |
| 9 | April 20 | 2:00 p.m. EST | Indians | **W** 5–2 | **Niekro** (2–1) | Román (0–2) | **Righetti** (4) | 2:37 | 20,188 | 5–4 | W1 |
| 10 | April 21 | 2:00 p.m. EST | Indians | L 0–3 | Von Ohlen (2–1) | **Whitson** (0–2) | Waddell (3) | 2:24 | 34,443 | 5–5 | L1 |
| 11 | April 23 | 8:00 p.m. EST | Red Sox | L 4–5 (11) | Ojeda (2–0) | **Righetti** (1–1) | – | 3:34 | 25,207 | 5–6 | L2 |
| 12 | April 24 | 8:00 p.m. EST | Red Sox | L 6–7 | Crawford (2–1) | **Guidry** (1–2) | Stanley (3) | 2:42 | 23,229 | 5–7 | L3 |
| 13 | April 25 | 8:00 p.m. EST | Red Sox | **W** 5–1 | **Niekro** (3–1) | Hurst (1–1) | **Righetti** (5) | 2:49 | 22.179 | 6–7 | W1 |
| 14 | April 26 | 8:30 p.m. EST | @ White Sox | L 2–4 | Seaver (2–0) | **Whitson** (0–3) | James (2) | 3:05 | 19,174 | 6–8 | L1 |
| 15 | April 27 | 1:20 p.m. EST | @ White Sox | L 4–5 (11) | Nelson (1–1) | **Shirley** (0–1) | – | 3:48 | 22,788 | 6–9 | L2 |
| 16 | April 28 | 2:30 p.m. EDT | @ White Sox | L 3–4 | Burns (3–1) | **Cowley** (0–1) | – | 2:40 | 27,637 | 6–10 | L3 |
| 17 | April 29 | 8:35 p.m. EDT | @ Rangers | L 5–7 | Schmidt (1–1) | **Guidry** (1–3) | Rozema (1) | 2:37 | 10,626 | 6–11 | L4 |
| 18 | April 30 | 8:35 p.m. EDT | @ Rangers | L 4–8 | Noles (2–1) | **Niekro** (3–2) | – | 2:17 | 15,416 | 6–12 | L5 |

May: 18–8 (Home: 10–0; Away: 8–8)

| # | Date | Time (ET) | Opponent | Score | Win | Loss | Save | Time of Game | Attendance | Record | Box/ Streak |
|---|---|---|---|---|---|---|---|---|---|---|---|
| 19 | May 1 | 8:35 p.m. EDT | @ Rangers | **W** | **Whitson** (1–3) | Hough (1–1) | **Righetti** (6) | 2:49 | 15,528 | 7–12 | W1 |
| 20 | May 3 | 8:00 p.m. EDT | Royals | **W** 7–1 | **Rasmussen** (1–1) | Jackson (1–1) | – | 2:36 | 20,603 | 8–12 | W2 |
| 21 | May 4 | 2:00 p.m. EDT | Royals | **W** 5–2 | **Guidry** (2–3) | Leibrandt (3–1) | – | 2:14 | 22,532 | 9–12 | W3 |
| 22 | May 5 | 2:00 p.m. EDT | Royals | **W** 6–2 | **Niekro** (4–2) | Black (2–2) | **Righetti** (7) | 2:33 | 50,209 | 10–12 | W4 |
| 23 | May 7 | 8:35 p.m. EDT | @ Twins | L 6–8 | Viola (5–2) | **Whitson** (1–4) | – | 2:49 | 21,704 | 10–13 | L1 |
| 24 | May 8 | 8:35 p.m. EDT | @ Twins | L 6–8 | Smithson (4–2) | **Cowley** (0–2) | Filson (1) | 2:53 | 22,832 | 10–14 | L2 |
| 25 | May 10 | 8:35 p.m. EDT | @ Royals | **W** 6–4 | **Guidry** (3–3) | Leibrandt (3–2) | **Righetti** (8) | 2:48 | 34,000 | 11–14 | W1 |
| 26 | May 11 | 4:05 p.m. EDT | @ Royals | **W** 11–3 | **Rasmussen** (2–1) | Black (2–3) | – | 2:35 | 38,011 | 12–14 | W2 |
| 27 | May 12 | 2:35 p.m. EDT | @ Royals | L 5–6 | Quisenberry (3–2) | **Righetti** (1–2) | – | 3:04 | 31,009 | 12–15 | L1 |
| 28 | May 13 | 8:00 p.m. EDT | Twins | **W** 9–8 | **Cowley** (1–2) | Davis (1–4) | – | 2:54 | 15,136 | 13–15 | W1 |
| 29 | May 14 | 8:00 p.m. EDT | Twins | **W** 10–7 | **Fisher** (1–0) | Wardle (0–2) | **Righetti** (9) | 2:47 | 18,319 | 14–15 | W2 |
| 30 | May 15 | 8:00 p.m. EDT | Rangers | **W** 6–5 (10) | **Righetti** (2–2) | Schmidt (1–2) | – | 3:01 | 17,232 | 15–15 | W3 |
| 31 | May 16 | 1:00 p.m. EDT | Rangers | **W** 6–5 | **Righetti** (3–2) | Stewart (0–3) | – | 3:11 | 21,010 | 16–15 | W4 |
| 32 | May 17 | 10:30 p.m. EDT | @ Angels | **W** 6–0 | **Niekro** (5–2) | Witt (2–4) | – | 2:40 | 61,066 | 17–15 | W5 |
| 33 | May 18 | 3:20 p.m. EDT | @ Angels | **W** 6–1 | **Cowley** (2–2) | John (2–3) | **Fisher** (1) | 2:48 | 32,936 | 18–15 | W6 |
| 34 | May 19 | 4:00 p.m. EDT | @ Angels | L 1–4 | Slaton (4–2) | **Whitson** (1–5) | Moore (9) | 2:29 | 39,724 | 18–16 | L1 |
| 35 | May 21 | 10:35 p.m. EDT | @ Mariners | **W** 11–1 | **Guidry** (4–3) | Langston (5–4) | – | 2:58 | 16,054 | 19–16 | W1 |
| 36 | May 22 | 10:35 p.m. EDT | @ Mariners | L 1–4 | Young (3–5) | **Rasmussen** (2–2) | – | 2:15 | 13,363 | 19–17 | L1 |
| 37 | May 23 | 10:35 p.m. EDT | @ Mariners | L 4–6 | Beattie (2–4) | **Niekro** (5–3) | Best (1) | 2:28 | 15,790 | 19–18 | L2 |
| 38 | May 24 | 10:35 p.m. EDT | @ Athletics | **W** 10–3 | **Cowley** (3–2) | Codiroli (5–2) | – | 3:05 | 22,919 | 20–18 | W1 |
| 39 | May 25 | 4:05 p.m. EDT | @ Athletics | L 7–8 | Howell (2–2) | **Righetti** (3–3) | – | 2:52 | 30,273 | 20–19 | L1 |
| 40 | May 26 | 4:05 p.m. EDT | @ Athletics | **W** 13–1 | **Guidry** (5–3) | Krueger (4–4) | – | 2:40 | 36,966 | 21–19 | W1 |
| 41 | May 27 | 9:15 p.m. EDT | @ Athletics | L 1–2 (10) | Howell (3–2) | **Righetti** (3–4) | – | 2:41 | 31,294 | 21–20 | L1 |
| 42 | May 29 | 8:00 p.m. EDT | Angels | **W** 7–2 | **Niekro** (6–3) | Slaton (4–3) | – | 2:30 | 25,049 | 22–20 | W1 |
| 43 | May 30 | 8:00 p.m. EDT | Angels | **W** 3–1 | **Cowley** (4–2) | Romanick (6–2) | **Righetti** (10) | 2:09 | 17,226 | 23–20 | W2 |
| 44 | May 31 | 8:00 p.m. EDT | Mariners | **W** 8–3 | **Fisher** (2–0) | Langston (5–5) | – | 2:49 | 20,309 | 24–20 | W3 |

June: 13–14 (Home: 8–8; Away: 5–6)

| # | Date | Time (ET) | Opponent | Score | Win | Loss | Save | Time of Game | Attendance | Record | Box/ Streak |
|---|---|---|---|---|---|---|---|---|---|---|---|
| 45 | June 1 | 8:00 p.m. EDT | Mariners | **W** 8–2 | **Guidry** (6–3) | Young (4–6) | – | 2:30 | 25,109 | 25–20 | W4 |
| 46 | June 2 | 2:00 p.m. EDT | Mariners | L 6–7 | Núñez (3–0) | **Rasmussen** (2–3) | Best (3) | 3:20 | 50,150 | 25–21 | L1 |
| 47 | June 3 | 8:00 p.m. EDT | Athletics | **W** 5–2 | **Niekro** (7–3) | Codiroli (6–3) | – | 2:43 | 15,228 | 26–21 | W1 |
| 48 | June 4 | 8:00 p.m. EDT | Athletics | L 0–2 | Birtsas (2–1) | **Cowley** (4–3) | Howell (12) | 2:55 | 20,242 | 26–22 | L1 |
| — | June 5 | | Athletics | **Postponed (Rain)** (Makeup date: September 7) | | | | | | | |
| 49 | June 6 | 8:35 p.m. EDT | @ Brewers | L 1–5 | Darwin (5–4) | **Whitson** (1–6) | – | 2:14 | 15,452 | 26–23 | L2 |
| 50 | June 7 | 8:35 p.m. EDT | @ Brewers | L 9–10 (10) | Searage (1–3) | **Righetti** (3–5) | – | 3:42 | 24,463 | 26–24 | L3 |
| 51 | June 8 | 2:35 p.m. EDT | @ Brewers | **W** 2–1 (13) | **Righetti** (4–5) | Gibson (5–3) | **Bordi** (1) | 4:18 | 40,913 | 27–24 | W1 |
| 52 | June 9 | 2:35 p.m. EDT | @ Brewers | L 4–9 | Vuckovich (2–3) | **Niekro** (7–4) | Ladd (1) | 2:59 | 44,621 | 27–25 | L1 |
| 53 | June 10 | 8:20 p.m. EDT | Blue Jays | **W** 4–2 | **Shirley** (1–1) | Alexander (7–3) | **Righetti** (11) | 2:33 | 20,329 | 28–25 | W1 |
| 54 | June 11 | 8:00 p.m. EDT | Blue Jays | L 1–4 (11) | Lamp (5–0) | **Fisher** (2–1) | – | 3:37 | 22,620 | 28–26 | L1 |
| 55 | June 12 | 8:00 p.m. EDT | Blue Jays | L 2–3 (10) | Acker (3–0) | **Bordi** (1–1) | – | 3:18 | 25,129 | 28–27 | L2 |
| 56 | June 14 | 8:00 p.m. EDT | Tigers | L 0–4 | Terrell (7–2) | **Rasmussen** (2–4) | Hernández (12) | 2:37 | 35,224 | 28–28 | L3 |
| 57 | June 15 | 4:05 p.m. EDT | Tigers | L 8–10 | Morris (8–5) | **Niekro** (7–5) | Hernández (13) | 3:05 | 55,623 | 28–29 | L4 |
| 58 | June 16 | 2:00 p.m. EDT | Tigers | **W** 2–1 | **Shirley** (2–1) | O'Neal (1–1) | – | 2:14 | 36,036 | 29–29 | W1 |
| 59 | June 17 | 7:35 p.m. EDT | @ Orioles | **W** 10–0 | **Guidry** (7–3) | McGregor (5–6) | – | 3:07 | 34,844 | 30–29 | W2 |
| 60 | June 18 | 7:35 p.m. EDT | @ Orioles | **W** 6–4 | **Cowley** (5–3) | Davis (4–3) | **Fisher** (2) | 3:17 | 33,794 | 31–29 | W3 |
| 61 | June 19 | 7:35 p.m. EDT | @ Orioles | **W** 10–0 | **Whitson** (2–6) | Martínez (5–4) | – | 2:49 | 37,470 | 32–29 | W4 |
| 62 | June 20 | 7:35 p.m. EDT | @ Tigers | L 9–10 (10) | Bair (2–0) | **Righetti** (4–6) | – | 3:49 | 36,565 | 32–30 | L1 |
| 63 | June 21 | 7:35 p.m. EDT | @ Tigers | L 4–6 | O'Neal (2–1) | **Niekro** (7–6) | Hernández (14) | 2:36 | 47,499 | 32–31 | L2 |
| 64 | June 22 | 4:05 p.m. EDT | @ Tigers | **W** 4–0 | **Guidry** (8–3) | Petry (9–5) | – | 2:27 | 41,774 | 33–31 | W1 |
| 65 | June 23 | 1:30 p.m. EDT | @ Tigers | L 1–3 | Tanana (3–7) | **Shirley** (2–2) | Hernández (15) | 2:26 | 40,929 | 33–32 | L1 |
| 66 | June 24 | 8:20 p.m. EDT | Orioles | **W** 5–4 | **Cowley** (6–3) | Martínez (5–5) | **Fisher** (3) | 2:56 | 25,201 | 34–32 | W1 |
| 67 | June 25 | 8:00 p.m. EDT | Orioles | **W** 7–4 | **Whitson** (3–6) | Boddicker (7–7) | **Righetti** (12) | 2:39 | 30,650 | 35–32 | W2 |
| 68 | June 26 | 8:00 p.m. EDT | Orioles | **W** 4–3 | **Righetti** (5–6) | Aase (4–3) | – | 3:09 | 30,929 | 36–32 | W3 |
| 69 | June 28 | 8:00 p.m. EDT | Brewers | **W** 5–2 | **Guidry** (9–3) | Darwin (6–7) | **Righetti** (13) | 2:58 | 21,649 | 37–32 | W4 |
| 70 | June 29 | 8:00 p.m. EDT | Brewers | L 0–6 | Haas (6–3) | **Niekro** (7–7) | – | 2:13 | 25,369 | 37–33 | L1 |
| 71 | June 30 | 2:00 p.m. EDT | Brewers | L 5–7 | McClure (2–0) | **Fisher** (2–2) | Fingers (9) | 2:51 | 51,459 | 37–34 | L2 |

July: 18–10 (Home: 10–1; Away: 8–9)

| # | Date | Time (ET) | Opponent | Score | Win | Loss | Save | Time of Game | Attendance | Record | Box/ Streak |
|---|---|---|---|---|---|---|---|---|---|---|---|
| 72 | July 1 | 1:35 p.m. EDT | @ Blue Jays | **W** 4–1 | **Cowley** (7–3) | Alexander (7–5) | **Righetti** (14) | 2:32 | 41,476 | 38–34 | W1 |
| 73 | July 2 | 7:35 p.m. EDT | @ Blue Jays | **W** 5–3 | **Whitson** (4–6) | Key (6–3) | – | 2:32 | 35,202 | 39–34 | W2 |
| 74 | July 3 | 12:35 p.m. EDT | @ Blue Jays | L 2–3 (10) | Acker (5–2) | **Bordi** (1–2) | – | 3:23 | 40,376 | 39–35 | L1 |
| 75 | July 4 | 7:00 p.m. EDT | Twins | **W** 3–2 | **Guidry** (10–3) | Butcher (5–6) | – | 2:16 | 35,110 | 40–35 | W1 |
| 76 | July 5 | 8:00 p.m. EDT | Twins | **W** 6–3 | **Rasmussen** (3–4) | Schrom (7–7) | **Fisher** (4) | 2:58 | 26,046 | 41–35 | W2 |
| — | July 6 | | Twins | **Postponed (Rain)** (Makeup date: July 7) | | | | | | | |
| 77 (1) | July 7 | 1:00 p.m. EDT | Twins | **W** 3–2 (11) | **Righetti** (6–6) | Wardle (1–3) | – | 3:21 | – | 42–35 | W3 |
| 78 (2) | July 7 | 4:56 p.m. EDT | Twins | **W** 14–2 | **Bordi** (2–2) | Lysander (0–2) | – | 2:35 | 31,549 | 43–35 | W4 |
| 80 | July 8 | 8:10 p.m. EDT | Royals | L 2–5 | Saberhagen (9–4) | **Niekro** (7–8) | – | 2:16 | 17,193 | 43–36 | L1 |
| 81 | July 9 | 8:00 p.m. EDT | Royals | **W** 6–4 | **Guidry** (11–3) | Black (5–10) | **Righetti** (15) | 3:11 | 24,528 | 44–36 | W1 |
| 82 | July 10 | 1:00 p.m. EDT | Royals | **W** 6–5 | **Righetti** (7–6) | Quisenberry (4–5) | – | 2:53 | 35,274 | 45–36 | W2 |
| 83 | July 11 | 8:00 p.m. EDT | Rangers | **W** 11–7 | **Shirley** (3–2) | Cook (2–1) | – | 3:02 | 21,863 | 46–36 | W3 |
| 84 | July 12 | 8:00 p.m. EDT | Rangers | **W** 6–0 | **Whitson** (5–6) | Sebra (0–2) | – | 2:02 | 21,832 | 47–36 | W4 |
| 85 | July 13 | 2:00 p.m. EDT | Rangers | **W** 3–1 | **Niekro** (8–8) | Mason (5–9) | **Righetti** (16) | 2:16 | 45,274 | 48–36 | W5 |
| 86 | July 14 | 2:00 p.m. EDT | Rangers | **W** 7–1 | **Guidry** (12–3) | Hooton (4–4) | – | 2:19 | 28,168 | 49–36 | W6 |
**56th All-Star Game in Minneapolis, MN**
| 86 | July 18 | 1:15 p.m. EDT | @ Twins | L 4–8 | Eufemia (3–0) | **Bordi** (2–3) | – | 3:02 | 43,081 | 49–37 | L1 |
| 87 | July 19 | 8:35 p.m. EDT | @ Twins | **W** 6–4 | **Cowley** (8–3) | Butcher (6–9) | **Righetti** (17) | 3:01 | 37,687 | 50–37 | W1 |
| 88 | July 20 | 8:35 p.m. EDT | @ Twins | **W** 8–3 | **Guidry** (13–3) | Schrom (8–9) | – | 2:38 | 37,919 | 51–37 | W2 |
| 89 | July 21 | 2:15 p.m. EDT | @ Twins | **W** 5–2 | **Niekro** (9–8) | Viola (10–8) | – | 2:46 | 30,037 | 52–37 | W3 |
| 90 | July 22 | 8:10 p.m. EDT | @ Royals | L 4–5 | Jones (2–2) | **Rasmussen** (3–5) | Quisenberry (19) | 2:56 | 40,938 | 52–38 | L1 |
| 91 | July 23 | 8:35 p.m. EDT | @ Royals | L 2–5 | Saberhagen (11–5) | **Whitson** (5–7) | Quisenberry (20) | 2:40 | 32,450 | 52–39 | L2 |
| 92 | July 24 | 8:35 p.m. EDT | @ Royals | L 3–5 | Leibrandt (10–5) | **Cowley** (8–4) | Quisenberry (21) | 2:45 | 31,580 | 52–40 | L3 |
| 93 | July 26 | 8:35 p.m. EDT | @ Rangers | L 8–9 | Noles (4–6) | **Righetti** (7–7) | Schmidt (3) | 2:55 | 30,069 | 52–41 | L4 |
| 94 | July 27 | 8:35 p.m. EDT | @ Rangers | **W** 14–2 | **Niekro** (10–8) | Cook (2–2) | – | 2:50 | 40,084 | 53–41 | W1 |
| 95 | July 28 | 7:05 p.m. EDT | @ Rangers | L 2–8 | Welsh (2–2) | **Bystrom** (0–1) | – | 2:45 | 22,523 | 53–42 | L1 |
| 96 | July 29 | 7:35 p.m. EDT | @ Indians | **W** 8–2 | **Whitson** (6–7) | Blyleven (9–11) | **Righetti** (18) | 2:42 | 15,042 | 54–42 | W1 |
| 97 (1) | July 30 | 5:05 p.m. EDT | @ Indians | **W** 8–5 | **Cowley** (9–4) | Thompson (3–4) | – | 3:30 | – | 55–42 | W2 |
| 98 (2) | July 30 | 9:10 p.m. EDT | @ Indians | L 2–3 | Romero (1–1) | **Shirley** (3–3) | Thompson (2) | 2:37 | 18,271 | 55–43 | L1 |
| 99 | July 31 | 7:35 p.m. EDT | @ Indians | L 5–6 | Waddell (5–5) | **Guidry** (13–4) | Thompson (3) | 3:00 | 7,593 | 55–44 | L2 |

August: 20–8 (Home: 10–3; Away: 10–5)

| # | Date | Time (ET) | Opponent | Score | Win | Loss | Save | Time of Game | Attendance | Record | Box/ Streak |
|---|---|---|---|---|---|---|---|---|---|---|---|
| 100 | August 1 | 7:35 p.m. EDT | @ Indians | L 1–9 | Smith (1–0) | **Niekro** (10–9) | – | 2:39 | 8,294 | 55–45 | L3 |
| 101 | August 2 | 8:20 p.m. EDT | White Sox | L 5–6 (11) | Agosto (3–2) | **Bordi** (2–4) | – | 4:07 | 27,118 | 55–46 | L4 |
| 102 | August 3 | 1:20 p.m. EDT | White Sox | **W** 8–4 | **Whitson** (7–7) | Long (0–1) | **Righetti** (19) | 2:46 | 37,726 | 56–46 | W1 |
| 103 | August 4 | 2:00 p.m. EDT | White Sox | L 1–4 | Seaver (12–8) | **Cowley** (9–5) | – | 3:20 | 54,032 | 56–47 | L1 |
| 104 | August 5 | 8:00 p.m. EDT | White Sox | **W** 7–3 | **Guidry** (14–4) | Bannister (5–9) | – | 2:36 | 28,320 | 57–47 | W1 |
| — | August 6 | | Indians | **Postponed (Strike)** (Makeup date: August 8) | | | | | | | |
| — | August 7 | | Indians | **Postponed (Strike)** (Makeup date: September 16) | | | | | | | |
| 105 (1) | August 8 | 5:30 p.m. EDT | Indians | **W** 8–1 | **Bystrom** (1–1) | Wardle (2–4) | – | 3:03 | – | 58–47 | W2 |
| 106 (2) | August 8 | 9:08 p.m. EDT | Indians | **W** 7–6 | **Fisher** (3–3) | Reed (0–4) | **Righetti** (20) | 3:09 | 25,692 | 59–47 | W3 |
| 107 | August 9 | 7:35 p.m. EDT | @ Red Sox | **W** 10–6 | **Bordi** (3–4) | Hurst (7–9) | – | 3:18 | 33,739 | 60–47 | W4 |
| 108 | August 10 | 2:05 p.m. EDT | @ Red Sox | **W** 7–3 | **Cowley** (10–5) | Boyd (11–10) | **Righetti** (21) | 3:15 | 33,309 | 61–47 | W5 |
| 109 | August 11 | 2:05 p.m. EDT | @ Red Sox | **W** 5–3 | **Guidry** (15–4) | Clemens (7–5) | **Fisher** (5) | 3:17 | 33,685 | 62–47 | W6 |
| 110 | August 12 | 8:30 p.m. EDT | @ White Sox | **W** 10–4 | **Niekro** (11–9) | Nelson (7–7) | – | 2:57 | 28,801 | 63–47 | W7 |
| 111 | August 13 | 8:30 p.m. EDT | @ White Sox | L 3–4 | Burns (12–7) | **Fisher** (3–3) | James (20) | 2:55 | 18,294 | 63–48 | L1 |
| 112 | August 14 | 8:30 p.m. EDT | @ White Sox | **W** 10–7 | **Fisher** (4–3) | James (4–5) | **Righetti** (22) | 3:38 | 21,184 | 64–48 | W1 |
| 113 | August 16 | 8:00 p.m. EDT | Red Sox | **W** 5–4 (10) | **Righetti** (8–7) | Crawford (5–3) | – | 3:35 | 42,787 | 65–48 | W2 |
| 114 | August 17 | 2:20 p.m. EDT | Red Sox | **W** 3–1 | **Guidry** (16–4) | Nipper (7–9) | **Fisher** (6) | 2:57 | 40,179 | 66–48 | W3 |
| 115 | August 18 | 2:00 p.m. EDT | Red Sox | **W** 4–2 | **Righetti** (9–7) | Lollar (5–7) | **Fisher** (7) | 2:54 | 44,170 | 67–48 | W4 |
| 116 | August 19 | 1:00 p.m. EDT | Red Sox | **W** 6–5 | **Bystrom** (2–1) | Clear (1–3) | **Bordi** (2) | 2:45 | 38,164 | 68–48 | W5 |
| 117 | August 20 | 10:30 p.m. EDT | @ Angels | **W** 8–5 | **Bordi** (4–4) | Slaton (5–10) | **Righetti** (23) | 3:04 | 38,791 | 69–48 | W6 |
| 118 | August 21 | 10:30 p.m. EDT | @ Angels | **W** 13–10 (10) | **Righetti** (10–7) | Moore (7–7) | – | 4:01 | 40,363 | 70–48 | W7 |
| 119 | August 22 | 10:30 p.m. EDT | @ Angels | L 2–3 | Witt (11–7) | **Bordi** (4–5) | – | 3:23 | 44,796 | 70–49 | L1 |
| 120 | August 23 | 10:35 p.m. EDT | @ Mariners | **W** 3–1 | **Niekro** (12–9) | Swift (4–7) | **Allen** (1) | 2:40 | 18,821 | 71–49 | W1 |
| 121 | August 24 | 10:05 p.m. EDT | @ Mariners | **W** 4–3 | **Bystrom** (3–1) | Langston (7–10) | **Fisher** (8) | 2:51 | 21,489 | 72–49 | W2 |
| 122 | August 25 | 4:35 p.m. EDT | @ Mariners | **W** 8–5 | **Whitson** (8–7) | Moore (11–8) | **Fisher** (9) | 3:03 | 28,678 | 73–49 | W3 |
| 123 | August 26 | 10:35 p.m. EDT | @ Athletics | L 2–3 (15) | Langford (2–5) | **Shirley** (3–4) | – | 4:44 | 42,118 | 73–50 | L1 |
| 124 | August 27 | 10:35 p.m. EDT | @ Athletics | L 0–3 | John (4–5) | **Guidry** (16–5) | Ontiveros (7) | 2:07 | 24,555 | 73–51 | L2 |
| 125 | August 29 | 8:00 p.m. EDT | Angels | **W** 4–0 | **Niekro** (13–9) | McCaskill (9–9) | – | 2:43 | 32,169 | 74–51 | W1 |
| 126 | August 30 | 8:00 p.m. EDT | Angels | L 1–4 | Candelaria (3–1) | **Bystrom** (3–2) | Moore (24) | 3:09 | 22,256 | 74–52 | L1 |
| 127 | August 31 | 1:20 p.m. EDT | Angels | **W** 10–4 | **Righetti** (11–7) | Corbett (2–2) | – | 3:04 | 26,991 | 75–52 | W1 |

September: 18–10 (Home: 14–5; Away: 4–5)

| # | Date | Time (ET) | Opponent | Score | Win | Loss | Save | Time of Game | Attendance | Record | Box/ Streak |
|---|---|---|---|---|---|---|---|---|---|---|---|
| 128 | September 1 | 2:00 p.m. EDT | Angels | **W** 5–3 | **Shirley** (4–4) | Holland (0–1) | **Fisher** (10) | 3:06 | 33,080 | 76–52 | W2 |
| 129 | September 2 | 1:00 p.m. EDT | Mariners | **W** 8–7 | **Guidry** (17–5) | Wills (4–7) | **Righetti** (24) | 3:27 | 26,427 | 77–52 | W3 |
| 130 | September 3 | 8:00 p.m. EDT | Mariners | **W** 6–3 | **Niekro** (14–9) | Swift (4–9) | **Righetti** (25) | 2:56 | 17,255 | 78–52 | W4 |
| 131 | September 4 | 8:00 p.m. EDT | Mariners | **W** 4–3 | **Bordi** (5–5) | Langston (7–12) | **Shirley** (1) | 2:51 | 21,605 | 79–52 | W5 |
| 132 | September 5 | 8:00 p.m. EDT | Athletics | **W** 7–3 | **Whitson** (9–7) | Atherton (4–7) | – | 2:56 | 20,954 | 80–52 | W6 |
| 133 | September 6 | 8:00 p.m. EDT | Athletics | **W** 8–4 | **Shirley** (5–4) | Codiroli (10–12) | – | 3:00 | 22,519 | 81–52 | W7 |
| 134 | September 7 | 8:00 p.m. EDT | Athletics | **W** 3–2 | **Guidry** (18–5) | John (4–7) | **Fisher** (11) | 2:37 | 25,539 | 82–52 | W8 |
| 135 | September 8 | 2:00 p.m. EDT | Athletics | **W** 9–6 | **Niekro** (15–9) | Rijo (3–2) | – | 3:21 | 26,809 | 83–52 | W9 |
| 136 | September 9 | 8:35 p.m. EDT | @ Brewers | **W** 9–4 (10) | **Righetti** (12–7) | Searage (1–4) | – | 3:44 | 7,176 | 84–52 | W10 |
| 137 | September 10 | 8:35 p.m. EDT | @ Brewers | **W** 13–10 | **Whitson** (10–7) | Burris (9–12) | **Shirley** (2) | 3:10 | 7,971 | 85–52 | W11 |
| 138 | September 11 | 8:35 p.m. EDT | @ Brewers | L 3–4 | Higuera (13–6) | **Bordi** (5–6) | – | 2:56 | 8,540 | 85–53 | L1 |
| 139 | September 12 | 8:00 p.m. EDT | Blue Jays | **W** 7–5 | **Guidry** (19–5) | Lavelle (4–7) | **Fisher** (12) | 2:54 | 52,141 | 86–53 | W1 |
| 140 | September 13 | 8:00 p.m. EDT | Blue Jays | L 2–3 | Lavelle (5–7) | **Niekro** (15–10) | Henke (12) | 3:13 | 53,303 | 86–54 | L1 |
| 141 | September 14 | 8:00 p.m. EDT | Blue Jays | L 4–7 | Key (13–6) | **Bordi** (5–7) | – | 2:51 | 54,367 | 86–55 | L2 |
| 142 | September 15 | 2:00 p.m. EDT | Blue Jays | L 5–8 | Alexander (16–8) | **Whitson** (10–8) | – | 3:13 | 54,699 | 86–56 | L3 |
| 143 | September 16 | 1:00 p.m. EDT | Indians | L 5–9 | Reed (1–5) | **Fisher** (4–4) | – | 3:24 | 15,320 | 86–57 | L4 |
| 144 | September 17 | 7:35 p.m. EDT | @ Tigers | L 1–9 | Petry (15–11) | **Guidry** (19–6) | – | 2:21 | 20,213 | 86–58 | L5 |
| 145 | September 18 | 7:35 p.m. EDT | @ Tigers | L 2–5 | Mahler (1–2) | **Niekro** (15–11) | Hernández (29) | 2:32 | 20,318 | 86–59 | L6 |
| 146 | September 19 | 7:35 p.m. EDT | @ Tigers | L 3–10 | Tanana (9–14) | **Niekro** (0–1) | – | 2:44 | 19,588 | 86–60 | L7 |
| 147 | September 20 | 8:05 p.m. EDT | @ Orioles | L 2–4 | Flanagan (4–4) | **Bordi** (5–8) | Aase (13) | 2:59 | 33,957 | 86–61 | L8 |
| 148 | September 21 | 1:20 p.m. EDT | @ Orioles | **W** 5–2 | **Cowley** (11–5) | Davis (10–8) | **Fisher** (13) | 3:17 | 33,873 | 87–61 | W1 |
| 149 | September 22 | 2:05 p.m. EDT | @ Orioles | **W** 5–4 | **Guidry** (20–6) | Dixon (8–4) | **Righetti** (26) | 2:46 | 33,045 | 88–61 | W2 |
| 150 | September 24 | 8:00 p.m. EDT | Tigers | L 1–9 | Tanana (10–14) | **Niekro** (15–12) | – | 2:22 | 16,702 | 88–62 | L1 |
| 151 | September 25 | 8:00 p.m. EDT | Tigers | **W** 10–2 | **Niekro** (1–1) | Morris (15–11) | – | 2:47 | 17,010 | 89–62 | W1 |
| — | September 26 | | Tigers | **Cancelled (Rain)** | | | | | | | |
| — | September 27 | | Orioles | **Postponed (Rain)** (Makeup date: September 29) | | | | | | | |
| 152 | September 28 | 2:00 p.m. EDT | Orioles | **W** 4–0 | **Guidry** (21–6) | Stewart (5–6) | – | 2:58 | 30,486 | 90–62 | W1 |
| 153 (1) | September 29 | 1:00 p.m. EDT | Orioles | **W** 4–0 | **Cowley** (12–5) | McGregor (13–14) | **Righetti** (27) | 2:33 | – | 91–62 | W3 |
| 154 (2) | September 29 | 4:08 p.m. EDT | Orioles | **W** 9–2 | **Bordi** (6–8) | Havens (0–1) | **Scurry** (1) | 2:37 | 30,291 | 92–62 | W3 |
| 155 | September 30 | 8:00 p.m. EDT | Orioles | **W** 5–4 | **Allen** (1–0) | Aase (9–6) | – | 3:16 | 15,041 | 93–62 | W4 |

October: 4–2 (Home: 2–1; Away: 2–1)

| # | Date | Time (ET) | Opponent | Score | Win | Loss | Save | Time of Game | Attendance | Record | Box/ Streak |
|---|---|---|---|---|---|---|---|---|---|---|---|
| 156 | October 1 | 8:00 p.m. EDT | Brewers | **W** 6–1 | **Niekro** (2–1) | Cocanower (5–8) | **Righetti** (28) | 2:30 | 15,101 | 94–62 | W5 |
| 157 | October 2 | 8:00 p.m. EDT | Brewers | L 0–1 | Higuera (15–8) | **Shirley** (5–5) | – | 2:10 | 11,879 | 94–63 | L1 |
| 158 | October 3 | 8:00 p.m. EDT | Brewers | **W** 3–0 | **Guidry** (22–6) | Leary (1–4) | **Fisher** (14) | 2:32 | 15,226 | 95–63 | W1 |
| 159 | October 4 | 7:35 p.m. EDT | @ Blue Jays | **W** 4–3 | **Scurry** (1–0) | Henke (3–3) | **Righetti** (29) | 2:55 | 47,686 | 96–63 | W2 |
| 160 | October 5 | 1:35 p.m. EDT | @ Blue Jays | L 1–5 | Alexander (17–10) | **Cowley** (12–6) | – | 2:38 | 44,608 | 96–64 | L1 |
| 161 | October 6 | 1:35 p.m. EDT | @ Blue Jays | **W** 8–0 | **Niekro** (16–12) | Cerutti (0–2) | – | 2:25 | 44,422 | 97–64 | W1 |

Legend: = Win = Loss = Postponement
Bold = Yankees team member

== Player stats ==
| = Indicates team leader |

| = Indicates league leader |

=== Batting ===
==== Starters by position ====
Note: Pos = Position; G = Games played; AB = At bats; H = Hits; R = Runs; Avg. = Batting average; HR = Home runs; RBI = Runs batted in; SB = Stolen Bases

| Pos | Player | G | AB | H | R | Avg. | HR | RBI | SB |
|---|---|---|---|---|---|---|---|---|---|
| C | Butch Wynegar | 102 | 309 | 69 | 27 | .223 | 5 | 32 | 0 |
| 1B | Don Mattingly | 159 | 652 | 211 | 107 | .324 | 35 | 145 | 2 |
| 2B | Willie Randolph | 143 | 597 | 137 | 75 | .276 | 5 | 40 | 16 |
| 3B | Mike Pagliarulo | 138 | 380 | 91 | 55 | .239 | 19 | 62 | 0 |
| SS | Bobby Meacham | 156 | 481 | 105 | 70 | .218 | 1 | 47 | 25 |
| LF | Ken Griffey, Sr. | 127 | 438 | 120 | 68 | .274 | 10 | 69 | 7 |
| CF | Rickey Henderson | 143 | 547 | 172 | 146 | .314 | 24 | 72 | 80 |
| RF | Dave Winfield | 155 | 633 | 174 | 105 | .275 | 26 | 114 | 19 |
| DH | Don Baylor | 142 | 477 | 110 | 70 | .231 | 23 | 91 | 0 |

==== Other batters ====
Note: G = Games pitched; AB = At bats; H = Hits; Avg. = Batting average; HR = Home runs; RBI = Runs batted in

| Player | G | AB | H | Avg. | HR | RBI |
|---|---|---|---|---|---|---|
| Ron Hassey | 92 | 267 | 79 | .296 | 13 | 42 |
| Dan Pasqua | 60 | 148 | 31 | .209 | 9 | 25 |
| Billy Sample | 59 | 139 | 40 | .288 | 1 | 15 |
| Andre Robertson | 50 | 125 | 41 | .328 | 2 | 17 |
| Dale Berra | 48 | 109 | 25 | .229 | 1 | 8 |
| Omar Moreno | 34 | 66 | 13 | .197 | 1 | 4 |
| Henry Cotto | 34 | 56 | 17 | .304 | 1 | 6 |
| Rex Hudler | 20 | 51 | 8 | .157 | 0 | 1 |
| Scott Bradley | 19 | 49 | 8 | .163 | 0 | 1 |
| Juan Bonilla | 8 | 16 | 2 | .125 | 0 | 2 |
| Juan Espino | 9 | 11 | 4 | .364 | 0 | 0 |
| Victor Mata | 6 | 7 | 1 | .143 | 0 | 0 |
| Keith Smith | 4 | 0 | 0 | ---- | 0 | 0 |

=== Pitching ===
==== Starting pitchers ====
Note: G = Games pitched; IP = Innings pitched; W = Wins; L = Losses; ERA = Earned run average; SO = Strikeouts

| Player | G | IP | W | L | ERA | SO |
|---|---|---|---|---|---|---|
| Ron Guidry | 34 | 259.0 | 22 | 6 | 3.27 | 143 |
| Phil Niekro | 33 | 220.0 | 16 | 12 | 4.09 | 149 |
| Joe Cowley | 30 | 159.2 | 12 | 6 | 3.95 | 97 |
| Ed Whitson | 30 | 158.2 | 10 | 8 | 4.88 | 89 |
| Marty Bystrom | 8 | 41.0 | 3 | 2 | 5.71 | 16 |
| Joe Niekro | 3 | 12.1 | 2 | 1 | 5.84 | 4 |

==== Other pitchers ====
Note: G = Games pitched; IP = Innings pitched; W = Wins; L = Losses; ERA = Earned run average; SO = Strikeouts

| Player | G | IP | W | L | ERA | SO |
|---|---|---|---|---|---|---|
| Bob Shirley | 48 | 109.0 | 5 | 5 | 2.64 | 55 |
| Dennis Rasmussen | 22 | 101.2 | 3 | 5 | 3.98 | 63 |
| John Montefusco | 3 | 7.0 | 0 | 0 | 10.29 | 2 |

==== Relief pitchers ====
Note: G = Games pitched; W = Wins; L = Losses; SV = Saves; ERA = Earned run average; SO = Strikeouts

| Player | G | W | L | SV | ERA | SO |
|---|---|---|---|---|---|---|
| Dave Righetti | 74 | 12 | 7 | 29 | 2.78 | 92 |
| Brian Fisher | 55 | 4 | 4 | 14 | 2.38 | 85 |
| Rich Bordi | 51 | 6 | 8 | 2 | 3.21 | 64 |
| Neil Allen | 17 | 1 | 0 | 1 | 2.76 | 16 |
| Mike Armstrong | 9 | 0 | 0 | 0 | 3.07 | 11 |
| Don Cooper | 7 | 0 | 0 | 0 | 5.40 | 4 |
| Rod Scurry | 5 | 1 | 0 | 1 | 2.84 | 17 |
| Dale Murray | 3 | 0 | 0 | 0 | 13.50 | 0 |

== Awards and honors ==
- Don Baylor – Roberto Clemente Award
- Ron Guidry – Gold Glove
- Rickey Henderson – American League Leader Stolen Bases (80)
- Rickey Henderson – Major League Baseball Leader Runs Scored (146)
- Rickey Henderson – Silver Slugger Award
- Don Mattingly – American League Most Valuable Player
- Don Mattingly – American League Leader RBI (145)
- Don Mattingly – Gold Glove
- Don Mattingly – Silver Slugger Award
- Dave Winfield – Silver Slugger Award
- Dave Winfield – Gold Glove

All-Star Game

- Don Mattingly, first base
- Dave Winfield, outfield
- Rickey Henderson, outfield

== Farm system ==
| Level | Team | League | Manager |
|---|---|---|---|
| AAA | Columbus Clippers | International League | Doug Holmquist and Stump Merrill |
| AA | Albany-Colonie Yankees | Eastern League | Barry Foote |
| A | Fort Lauderdale Yankees | Florida State League | Bucky Dent |
| A-Short Season | Oneonta Yankees | New York–Penn League | Buck Showalter |
| Rookie | GCL Yankees | Gulf Coast League | Carlos Tosca |

LEAGUE CHAMPIONS: Oneonta, GCL Yankees
