= 1985 Boston Red Sox season =

Major League Baseball season

1985 Boston Red Sox
- League: American League
- Division: East
- Ballpark: Fenway Park
- City: Boston, Massachusetts
- Record: 81–81 (.500)
- Divisional place: 5th
- Owners: Buddy LeRoux, Haywood Sullivan, Jean Yawkey
- President: Jean Yawkey
- General manager: Lou Gorman
- Manager: John McNamara
- Television: WSBK-TV, Ch. 38; NESN (Ned Martin, Bob Montgomery)
- Radio: WPLM-FM 99.1; WPLM-AM 1390 (Ken Coleman, Joe Castiglione)
- Stats: ESPN.com; Baseball Reference

The 1985 Boston Red Sox season was the 85th season in the franchise's Major League Baseball history. The Red Sox finished fifth in the American League East with a record of 81 wins and 81 losses, 18 1/2 games behind the Toronto Blue Jays.

== Offseason ==
- January 14, 1985: Pitcher Bruce Kison was signed as a free agent by the Red Sox.

== Regular season ==
Record by month
Month	Record		Cumulative		AL East		Ref.
Month	Won	Lost	Won	Lost	Position	GB	Ref.
April	9	11	9	11	4th	4	
May	12	14	21	25	6th	9 1/2	
June	17	10	38	35	5th	7 1/2	
July	14	12	52	47	4th	10 1/2	
August	8	21	60	68	5th	20 1/2	
September	19	9	79	77	5th	19 1/2	
October	2	4	81	81	5th	18 1/2	

The Red Sox also had one game end in a tie; on July 31, a home game against the Chicago White Sox was ended in the 7th inning due to rain, with the score tied, 1–1. It was the first tie game for the Red Sox since June 8, 1961. The game was replayed the following day as part of a doubleheader. MLB games that end in a tie are not included in league standings, although individual player statistics (e.g. hits, errors, innings pitched) are counted.

=== Season standings ===
AL East
Team	W	L	Pct.	GB	Home	Road
Toronto Blue Jays	99	62	.615	—	54‍–‍26	45‍–‍36
New York Yankees	97	64	.602	2	58‍–‍22	39‍–‍42
Detroit Tigers	84	77	.522	15	44‍–‍37	40‍–‍40
Baltimore Orioles	83	78	.516	16	45‍–‍36	38‍–‍42
Boston Red Sox	81	81	.500	18½	43‍–‍37	38‍–‍44
Milwaukee Brewers	71	90	.441	28	40‍–‍40	31‍–‍50
Cleveland Indians	60	102	.370	39½	38‍–‍43	22‍–‍59

=== Record vs. opponents ===
1985 American League record Sources:
Team	BAL	BOS	CAL	CWS	CLE	DET	KC	MIL	MIN	NYY	OAK	SEA	TEX	TOR
Baltimore	—	5–8	7–5	8–4	8–5	6–7	6–6	9–4	6–6	1–12	7–5	6–6	10–2	4–8
Boston	8–5	—	5–7	4–8–1	8–5	6–7	5–7	5–8	7–5	5–8	8–4	6–6	5–7	9–4
California	5–7	7–5	—	8–5	8–4	8–4	4–9	9–3	9–4	3–9	6–7	9–4	9–4	5–7
Chicago	4–8	8–4–1	5–8	—	10–2	6–6	5–8	5–7	6–7	6–6	8–5	9–4	10–3	3–9
Cleveland	5–8	5–8	4–8	2–10	—	5–8	2–10	7–6	4–8	6–7	3–9	6–6	7–5	4–9
Detroit	7–6	7–6	4–8	6–6	8–5	—	5–7	9–4	3–9	9–3	8–4	5–7	7–5	6–7
Kansas City	6–6	7–5	9–4	8–5	10–2	7–5	—	8–4	7–6	5–7	8–5	3–10	6–7	7–5
Milwaukee	4–9	8–5	3–9	7–5	6–7	4–9	4–8	—	9–3	7–6	3–9	4–8	8–3	4–9
Minnesota	6–6	5–7	4–9	7–6	8–4	9–3	6–7	3–9	—	3–9	8–5	6–7	8–5	4–8
New York	12–1	8–5	9–3	6–6	7–6	3–9	7–5	6–7	9–3	—	7–5	9–3	8–4	6–7
Oakland	5–7	4–8	7–6	5–8	9–3	4–8	5–8	9–3	5–8	5–7	—	8–5	6–7	5–7
Seattle	6–6	6–6	4–9	4–9	6–6	7–5	10–3	8–4	7–6	3–9	5–8	—	6–7	2–10
Texas	2–10	7–5	4–9	3–10	5–7	5–7	7–6	3–8	5–8	4–8	7–6	7–6	—	3–9
Toronto	8–4	4–9	7–5	9–3	9–4	7–6	5–7	9–4	8–4	7–6	7–5	10–2	9–3	—

=== Notable transactions ===
- The Red Sox drafted pitcher Dan Gabriele in the first round (21st overall) of the 1985 Major League Baseball draft. Gabriele went on to pitch in Boston's farm system through 1989, reaching the Double-A level.

=== Opening Day lineup ===
26	Wade Boggs	3B
24	Dwight Evans	RF
14	Jim Rice	LF
7	Mike Easler	DH
20	Tony Armas	CF
6	Bill Buckner	1B
10	Rich Gedman	C
17	Marty Barrett	2B
41	Jackie Gutiérrez	SS
23	Oil Can Boyd	P

=== Roster ===
1985 Boston Red Sox
Roster
Pitchers: 23 Oil Can Boyd; 27 Mike Brown; 25 Mark Clear; 21 Roger Clemens; 28 Steve Crawford; 44 Jim Dorsey; 47 Bruce Hurst; 29 Bruce Kison; 48 Tim Lollar; 43 Tom McCarthy; 38 Charlie Mitchell; 49 Al Nipper; 19 Bob Ojeda; 27 Jeff Sellers; 46 Bob Stanley; 45 Mike Trujillo; 42 Rob Woodward	Catchers: 10 Rich Gedman; 16 Dave Sax; 15 Marc Sullivan; Infielders: 17 Marty Barrett; 26 Wade Boggs; 6 Bill Buckner; 41 Jackie Gutiérrez; 18 Glenn Hoffman; 22 Ed Jurak; 11 Dave Stapleton	Outfielders: 20 Tony Armas; 24 Dwight Evans; 39 Mike Greenwell; 12 Steve Lyons; 3 Rick Miller; 13 Reid Nichols; 14 Jim Rice; 16 Kevin Romine; Other batters: 7 Mike Easler	Manager: 1 John McNamara; Coaches: 34 Bill Fischer (Pitching); 33 Walt Hriniak (Hitting); 36 Rene Lachemann (Third base); 35 Joe Morgan (First base); 32 Tony Torchia (Bullpen)

== Player stats ==
= Indicates team leader

= Indicates league leader

=== Batting ===
Note: G = Games played; AB = At bats; R = Runs; H = Hits; 2B = Doubles; 3B = Triples; HR = Home runs; RBI = Runs batted in; SB = Stolen bases; BB = Walks; AVG = Batting average; SLG = Slugging average

Player	G	AB	R	H	2B	3B	HR	RBI	SB	BB	AVG	SLG
Bill Buckner	162	673	89	201	46	3	16	110	18	30	.299	.447
Wade Boggs	161	653	107	240	42	3	8	78	2	96	.368	.478
Dwight Evans	159	617	110	162	29	1	29	78	7	114	.263	.454
Mike Easler	155	568	71	149	29	4	16	74	0	53	.262	.412
Jim Rice	140	546	85	159	20	3	27	103	2	51	.291	.487
Marty Barrett	156	534	59	142	26	0	5	56	7	56	.266	.343
Rich Gedman	144	498	66	147	30	5	18	80	2	50	.295	.484
Tony Armas	103	385	50	102	17	5	23	64	0	18	.265	.514
Steve Lyons	133	371	52	98	14	3	5	30	12	32	.264	.358
Glenn Hoffman	96	279	40	77	17	2	6	34	2	25	.276	.416
Jackie Gutiérrez	103	275	33	60	5	2	2	21	10	12	.218	.273
Marc Sullivan	32	69	10	12	2	0	2	3	0	6	.174	.290
Dave Stapleton	30	66	4	15	6	0	0	2	0	4	.227	.318
Rick Miller	41	45	5	15	2	0	0	9	1	5	.333	.378
Dave Sax	22	36	2	11	3	0	0	6	0	3	.306	.389
Reid Nichols	21	32	3	6	1	0	1	3	1	2	.188	.313
Mike Greenwell	17	31	7	10	1	0	4	8	1	3	.323	.742
Kevin Romine	24	28	3	6	2	0	0	1	1	1	.214	.286
Ed Jurak	26	13	4	3	0	0	0	0	0	1	.231	.231
Tim Lollar	1	1	0	0	0	0	0	0	0	0	.000	.000
Team totals	163	5720	800	1615	292	31	162	760	66	562	.282	.429

=== Pitching ===
Note: W = Wins; L = Losses; ERA = Earned run average; G = Games pitched; GS = Games started; SV = Saves; IP = Innings pitched; H = Hits allowed; R = Runs allowed; ER = Earned runs allowed; BB = Walks allowed; SO = Strikeouts

Player	W	L	ERA	G	GS	SV	IP	H	R	ER	BB	SO
Oil Can Boyd	15	13	3.70	35	35	0	272.1	273	117	112	67	154
Bruce Hurst	11	13	4.51	35	31	0	229.1	243	123	115	70	189
Al Nipper	9	12	4.06	25	25	0	162.0	157	83	73	82	85
Bob Ojeda	9	11	4.00	39	22	1	157.2	166	74	70	48	102
Roger Clemens	7	5	3.29	15	15	0	98.1	83	38	36	37	74
Bruce Kison	5	3	4.11	22	9	1	92.0	98	43	42	32	56
Steve Crawford	6	5	3.76	44	1	12	91.0	103	47	38	28	58
Bob Stanley	6	6	2.87	48	0	10	87.2	76	30	28	30	46
Mike Trujillo	4	4	4.82	27	7	1	84.0	112	55	45	23	19
Tim Lollar	5	5	4.57	16	10	1	67.0	57	37	34	40	44
Mark Clear	1	3	3.72	41	0	3	55.2	45	26	23	50	55
Rob Woodward	1	0	1.69	5	2	0	26.2	17	8	5	9	16
Jeff Sellers	2	0	3.63	4	4	0	22.1	24	10	9	7	6
Jim Dorsey	0	1	20.25	2	1	0	5.1	12	12	12	10	2
Tom McCarthy	0	0	10.80	3	0	0	5.0	7	6	6	4	2
Mike Brown	0	0	21.60	2	1	0	3.1	9	8	8	3	3
Charlie Mitchell	0	0	16.20	2	0	0	1.2	5	3	3	0	2
Team totals	81	81	4.06	163	163	29	1461.1	1487	720	659	540	913

== Statistical leaders ==
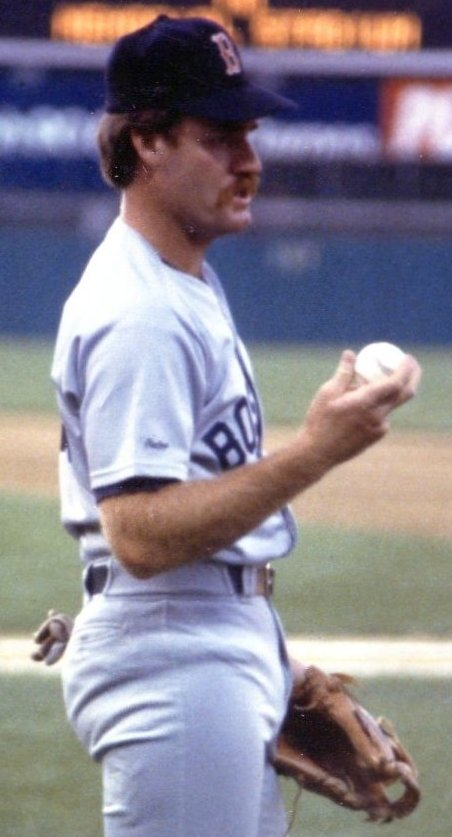
Wade Boggs

Category	Player	Statistic
Youngest player	Mike Greenwell	21
Youngest player	Jeff Sellers	21
Oldest player	Rick Miller	37
Wins Above Replacement	Wade Boggs	9.1

=== Batting ===
Abbr.	Category	Player	Statistic
G	Games played	Bill Buckner	162
PA	Plate appearances	Wade Boggs	758
AB	At bats	Bill Buckner	673
R	Runs scored	Dwight Evans	110
H	Hits	Wade Boggs	240
2B	Doubles	Bill Buckner	46
3B	Triples	Tony Armas	5
3B	Triples	Rich Gedman	5
HR	Home runs	Dwight Evans	29
RBI	Runs batted in	Bill Buckner	110
SB	Stolen bases	Bill Buckner	18
CS	Caught stealing	Steve Lyons	9
BB	Base on balls	Dwight Evans	114
SO	Strikeouts	Mike Easler	129
BA	Batting average	Wade Boggs	.368
OBP	On-base percentage	Wade Boggs	.450
SLG	Slugging percentage	Tony Armas	.514
OPS	On-base plus slugging	Wade Boggs	.928
OPS+	Adjusted OPS	Wade Boggs	151
TB	Total bases	Wade Boggs	312
GIDP	Grounded into double play	Jim Rice	35
HBP	Hit by pitch	Dwight Evans	5
HBP	Hit by pitch	Glenn Hoffman	5
SH	Sacrifice hits	Marty Barrett	12
SF	Sacrifice flies	Bill Buckner	11
IBB	Intentional base on balls	Rich Gedman	11

=== Pitching ===
Abbr.	Category	Player	Statistic
W	Wins	Oil Can Boyd	15
L	Losses	Oil Can Boyd	13
L	Losses	Bruce Hurst	13
W-L %	Winning percentage	Roger Clemens	.583 (7–5)
ERA	Earned run average	Oil Can Boyd	3.70
G	Games pitched	Bob Stanley	48
GS	Games started	Oil Can Boyd	35
GF	Games finished	Bob Stanley	41
CG	Complete games	Oil Can Boyd	13
SHO	Shutouts	Oil Can Boyd	3
SV	Saves	Steve Crawford	12
IP	Innings pitched	Oil Can Boyd	272 1/3
SO	Strikeouts	Bruce Hurst	189
WHIP	Walks plus hits per inning pitched	Oil Can Boyd	1.248

== Awards and honors ==
Awards

- Dwight Evans – Gold Glove Award (OF)

Accomplishments

- Wade Boggs, American League Batting Champion, .368
- Wade Boggs, American League Leader, Hits (240)
- Bill Buckner, MLB record, Most Assists in a Season by a First Baseman (184)

Surpassed by Albert Pujols in 2009

All-Star Game

- Wade Boggs, reserve 3B
- Rich Gedman, reserve C
- Jim Rice, starting LF

== Farm system ==
The Greensboro Hornets replaced the Winston-Salem Spirits as a Class A affiliate.

Level	Team	League	Manager
AAA	Pawtucket Red Sox	International League	Rac Slider
AA	New Britain Red Sox	Eastern League	Ed Nottle
A	Winter Haven Red Sox	Florida State League	Dave Holt
A	Greensboro Hornets	South Atlantic League	Doug Camilli
A-Short Season	Elmira Pioneers	New York–Penn League	Dick Berardino
