= Elias Gutiérrez =

Colombian sprinter

Personal information
- Full name: Campo Elías Gutiérrez
- Nationality: Colombian
- Born: 15 February 1911
- Died: July 1964 (aged 53) Cartagena de Indias, Colombia

Sport
- Sport: Sprinting
- Event: 100 metres

Elias Gutiérrez (15 February 1911 – July 1964) was a Colombian sprinter. He competed in the men's 100 metres and javelin at the 1936 Summer Olympics. His son, Jackie Gutiérrez, played Major League Baseball in the United States for the Boston Red Sox, Baltimore Orioles and Philadelphia Phillies between 1983 and 1988.
