= Jackie Gutiérrez =

Colombian baseball player (born 1960)

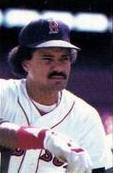
- Shortstop
- Born: June 27, 1960 (age 64); Cartagena, Colombia
- Batted: Right Threw: Right

MLB debut
- September 6, 1983, for the Boston Red Sox

Last MLB appearance
- October 1, 1988, for the Philadelphia Phillies

MLB statistics
- Batting average: .237
- Home runs: 4
- Runs batted in: 63

CPBL statistics
- Batting average: .210
- Home runs: 1
- Runs batted in: 4
- Stats at Baseball Reference

Teams
- Boston Red Sox (1983–1985); Baltimore Orioles (1986–1987); Philadelphia Phillies (1988); China Times Eagles (1993)

Joaquín Fernando "Jackie" Gutiérrez (born June 27, 1960) is a Colombian former professional baseball shortstop. He played in Major League Baseball (MLB) with the Boston Red Sox, Baltimore Orioles, and Philadelphia Phillies, and was the first Colombian MLB player to play for these teams. Listed at 5 feet 11 inches (1.80 m) and 175 pounds (79 kg), he batted and threw right-handed.

== Biography ==
Gutiérrez began his professional baseball career in 1978 with the Elmira Pioneers, a farm team of the Boston Red Sox. He reached the Triple-A level in 1983.

Gutiérrez reached the major leagues with Boston in 1983, playing in parts of three seasons with the Red Sox, including a career-high 151 games in 1984. The third native Colombian to play in MLB, he was the Red Sox's starting shortstop in 1984 and into the first two months of the following campaign. A knee injury sustained in a 10–3 loss to the Texas Rangers at Arlington Stadium on May 25, 1985 led to him being supplanted by Glenn Hoffman and unable to reclaim the position as he ended 1985 with 23 errors and a .218 batting average that was 45 points lower than from the previous year.

He was traded from the Red Sox to the Orioles for Sammy Stewart on December 17, 1985. Upon hearing reports that Gutiérrez was released by two winter ball teams in the Dominican Republic and Venezuela because of erratic behavior which involved frequent fights, the Orioles attempted to have the transaction restructured or voided, alleging that the Red Sox had prior knowledge of any such issues. American League president Bobby Brown upheld the deal on March 11, 1986, ruling that it was made in "good faith, with neither club knowingly misrepresenting the facts" and that "the Orioles' request to rescind the trade has been denied."

Entering the 1986 season, the Orioles' expectations for Gutiérrez was for him to become the starting third baseman, allowing Floyd Rayford to replace Rick Dempsey as catcher. Gutiérrez's fWAR of -1.7 was the lowest among all MLB players in the 1986 season.

Gutiérrez last played in MLB with the Philadelphia Phillies in 1988.

In parts of six major league seasons, Gutiérrez batted .237 with four home runs, 63 RBI, 106 runs, 24 doubles, five triples and 25 stolen bases in 356 games.

Gutiérrez continued his minor league career through 1990, last playing with the unaffiliated Miami Miracle. His final season playing professionally was 1993, when he played for the China Times Eagles in the Chinese Professional Baseball League.

During his time with the Boston Red Sox he was known as "The Whistler" for his constant whistling between pitches which could be heard all around every ballpark.

Gutiérrez's father, Elias Gutiérrez, represented Colombia at the 1936 Summer Olympics as a sprinter and javelin thrower.

== See also ==
- Players from Colombia in MLB
