= Steve Davis (pitcher) =

American baseball player (1960–2021)

- Pitcher
- Born: August 4, 1960; San Antonio, Texas
- Died: September 28, 2021 (aged 61); Fort Worth, Texas
- Batted: Left Threw: Left

MLB debut
- August 25, 1985, for the Toronto Blue Jays

Last MLB appearance
- September 19, 1989, for the Cleveland Indians

MLB statistics
- Win–loss record: 3–2
- Earned run average: 6.44
- Strikeouts: 39
- Stats at Baseball Reference

Teams
- Toronto Blue Jays (1985–1986); Cleveland Indians (1989)

Steven Kennon Davis (August 4, 1960 – September 28, 2021) was an American professional baseball pitcher who played for three seasons in Major League Baseball. He played for the Toronto Blue Jays from 1985 to 1986 and the Cleveland Indians in 1989.

Davis died of cancer on Sept. 28, 2021. He had a wife and three children.
