= Len Matuszek =

American baseball player (born 1954)

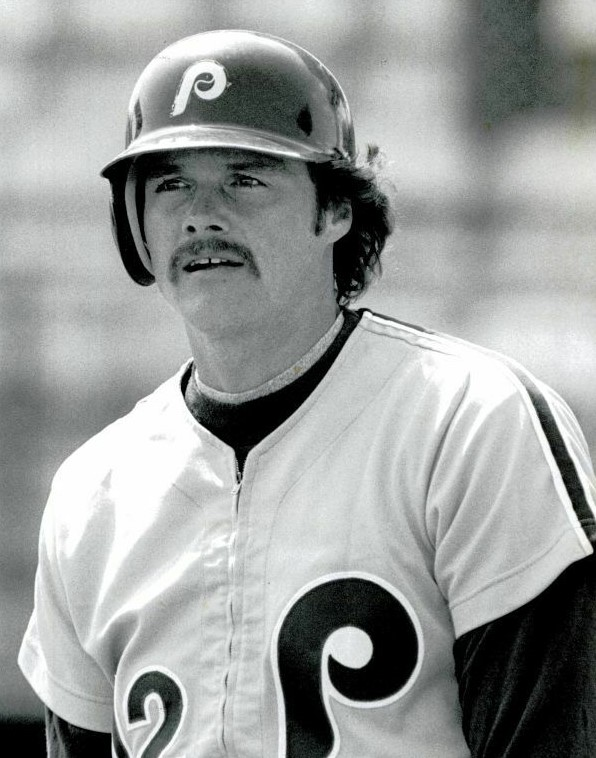
- First baseman
- Born: September 27, 1954 (age 71); Toledo, Ohio, U.S.
- Batted: Left Threw: Right

MLB debut
- September 3, 1981, for the Philadelphia Phillies

Last MLB appearance
- April 30, 1987, for the Los Angeles Dodgers

MLB statistics
- Batting average: .234
- Home runs: 30
- Runs batted in: 119
- Stats at Baseball Reference

Teams
- Philadelphia Phillies (1981–1984); Toronto Blue Jays (1985); Los Angeles Dodgers (1985–1987)

Leonard James Matuszek (born September 27, 1954), is an American former professional baseball first baseman and outfielder, who played in Major League Baseball (MLB) for the Philadelphia Phillies, Toronto Blue Jays, and Los Angeles Dodgers from 1981 to 1987. He batted left-handed and threw right-handed. Matuszek is an alumnus of the University of Toledo, where he played both varsity baseball and basketball, for all four of his college years. He was inducted into the Varsity “T” Athletic Hall-Of-Fame, in 1986.

== Career ==
Matuszek attended Moeller High School in Cincinnati and led his Crusader baseball team to the Ohio State Championship, in 1972. It was Moeller’s first State Title (in any team sport) in school history. He also led the Greater Cincinnati League (GCL) in scoring during his senior year in basketball, averaging 18.4 points per game (ppg). For his efforts, Matuszek was inducted into Moeller’s first Athletic Hall-Of-Fame class, in 1982.

Matuszek was drafted by the Philadelphia Phillies in the 5th round (113th pick overall) of the 1976 Major League Baseball draft. For his Phillies debut, on September 3, 1981, he hit a pinch-hit double in his first MLB at-bat, off of Bruce Berenyi of the Cincinnati Reds. Matuszek appeared in his final big league game on April 30, 1987, at Pittsburgh’s Three Rivers Stadium as his visiting Dodgers team lost to the Pirates, 5-4.

Matuszek is known for taking over the role as starting first baseman for the Philadelphia Phillies after they released Pete Rose following the 1983 season. In 1984, Matuszek’s first and only season as the Phillies’ starting first sacker, his stat line included a .248 batting average, with 12 home runs, and 43 runs batted in (RBI). That season, he was the top pinch-hitter in the National League (NL); coming off the bench, Matuszek compiled an impressive .400 batting average, with 3 homers, and 10 RBI.
