= Rich Bordi =

American baseball player (born 1959)

- Pitcher
- Born: April 18, 1959 (age 67); San Francisco, California, U.S.
- Batted: Right Threw: Right

MLB debut
- July 16, 1980, for the Oakland Athletics

Last MLB appearance
- July 19, 1988, for the Los Angeles Dodgers

MLB statistics
- Win–loss record: 20–20
- Earned run average: 4.34
- Strikeouts: 247
- Stats at Baseball Reference

Teams
- Oakland Athletics (1980–1981); Seattle Mariners (1982); Chicago Cubs (1983–1984); New York Yankees (1985); Baltimore Orioles (1986); New York Yankees (1987); Oakland Athletics (1988)

Richard Albert Bordi (born April 18, 1959) is an American former Major League Baseball relief pitcher who played from 1980 to 1988. He played for the Oakland Athletics, Seattle Mariners, Chicago Cubs, New York Yankees and Baltimore Orioles. Bordi threw and batted right-handed, was 6 feet 7 inches (201 cm) tall, and weighed 220 pounds (100 kg). He attended Fresno State University. He is currently a scout for the Cincinnati Reds.

In 1977, he was drafted in the 5th round (119th overall) by the Minnesota Twins. He opted not to sign. In 1980, he was drafted by the Athletics in the 3rd round, 56th overall.

In the same year, he was drafted he made his major league debut (July 16, 1980). He was 21 years old. In that game (and his lone game that season), he pitched 2 innings and gave up only one run. He bounced around between the minors and Majors between 1980 and 1983. He was sent from the Mariners to the Cubs for Steve Henderson at the Winter Meetings on December 9, 1982. He settled in as a full-time reliever in 1984 with the Cubs. He was dealt along with Henry Cotto, Ron Hassey and Porfi Altamirano from the Cubs to the Yankees for Ray Fontenot and Brian Dayett at the Winter Meetings on December 4, 1984. After a 6–8 campaign with a 3.21 ERA, he was traded along with Rex Hudler from the Yankees to the Orioles for Gary Roenicke on December 11, 1985 in a transaction that was completed five days later on December 16 when Leo Hernández was also sent to New York. Between 1984 and 1986 with the Cubs, Yankees and Orioles, he had an ERA well under 4.00. After those three fairly successful seasons, his career quickly went in the wrong direction. He ended up with the Athletics in his final season, 1988, where he started two games and lost one of them (won zero). His final game was July 19, 1988. He was 29 years old when he retired.

Bordi was the last player signed by Charlie Finley. He lives in Rohnert Park, California.
