= Keith Smith (shortstop) =

American baseball player (born 1961)

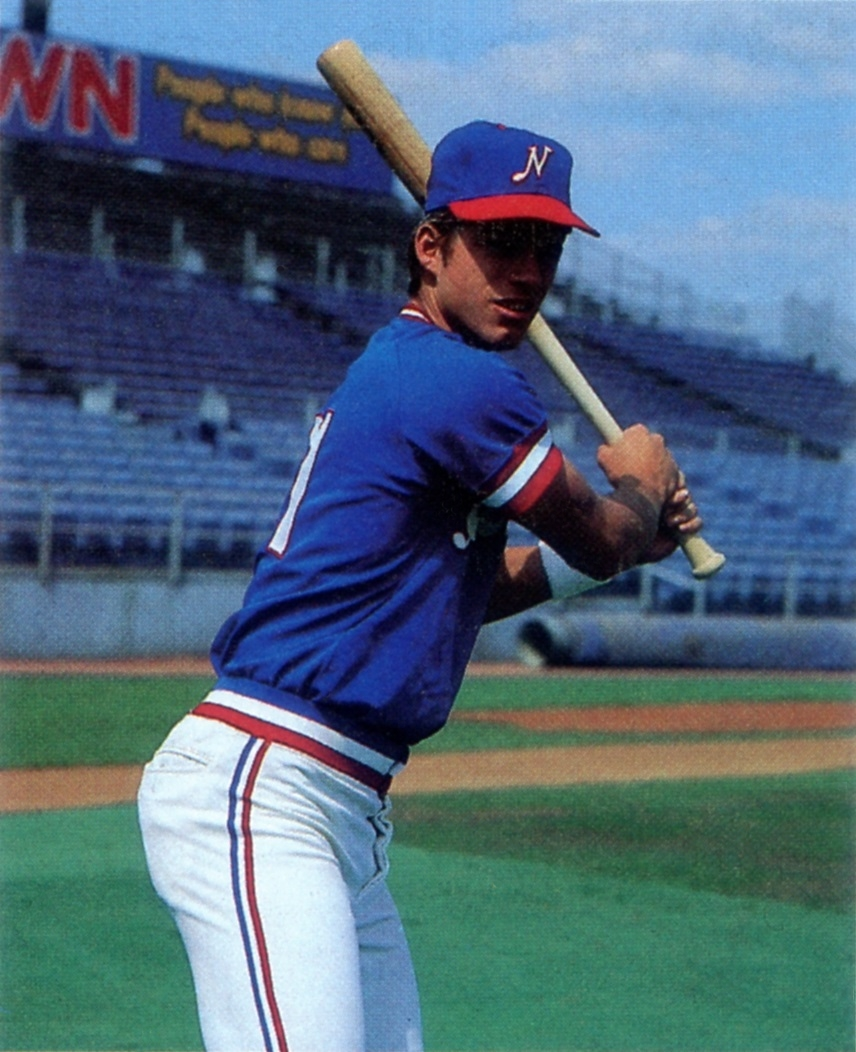
- Smith with the Nashville Sounds in 1983
- Shortstop
- Born: October 20, 1961 (age 64); Los Angeles, California, U.S.
- Batted: Switch Threw: Right

MLB debut
- April 12, 1984, for the New York Yankees

Last MLB appearance
- October 5, 1985, for the New York Yankees

MLB statistics
- Batting average: .000
- Home runs: 0
- Runs batted in: 0

CPBL statistics
- Batting average: .277
- Home runs: 1
- Runs batted in: 56
- Stats at Baseball Reference

Teams
- New York Yankees (1984–1985); Wei Chuan Dragons (1993–1994)

Patrick Keith Smith (born October 20, 1961) is a retired Major League Baseball shortstop. He played during two seasons at the major league level for the New York Yankees. He was drafted by the Yankees in the 15th round of the 1979 amateur draft. Smith played his first professional season with their Class A (Short Season) Oneonta Yankees in 1979, and his last season with the New York Mets' Triple-A Tidewater Tides, in 1992.
