= Britt Burns =

American baseball player (born 1959)

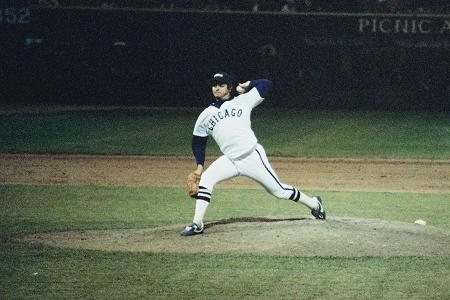
- Pitcher
- Born: June 8, 1959 (age 67); Houston, Texas, U.S.
- Batted: Left Threw: Left

MLB debut
- August 5, 1978, for the Chicago White Sox

Last MLB appearance
- September 30, 1985, for the Chicago White Sox

MLB statistics
- Win–loss record: 70–60
- Earned run average: 3.66
- Strikeouts: 734
- Stats at Baseball Reference

Teams
- Chicago White Sox (1978–1985)

Career highlights and awards
- All-Star (1981)

Robert Britt Burns (born June 8, 1959) is an American former professional baseball former pitcher who played eight seasons in Major League Baseball (MLB), all with the Chicago White Sox. He compiled a career mark of 70 wins and 60 losses with a 3.66 ERA.

Burns pitched for Fultondale High School in 1975, before transferring to Huffman High School in Birmingham, Alabama from 1976 to 1977. He played for coach Phil English at Huffman. When he graduated, he held the state record for career victories with 35 against only 2 losses (a record that stood for over 12 years), and as of 2008, still holds the single season record for lowest earned run average after posting a 0.00 in 1977. His career high school ERA was 0.12.

He was discovered by Chicago Tribune book critic Bob Cromie while pitching in Birmingham in 1978. He made his debut later that season at the age of 19. Burns did not become a full-time major leaguer until 1980 when he won 15 games. In 1983 he helped the White Sox into the ALCS against the Baltimore Orioles, pitching 9 1/3 innings before surrendering a home run to Tito Landrum in the fourth and final game of the series.

After winning 18 games for Chicago in 1985, Burns was traded on December 12 with Glen Braxton and Mike Soper to the New York Yankees for Ron Hassey and Joe Cowley. A chronic, degenerative hip condition, however, put Burns's career on hold before he could ever pitch for New York. After years of rehab, he attempted a comeback in 1990, making four unsuccessful minor-league starts before finally retiring as a player.

Burns was the minor league pitching coordinator for his hometown Houston Astros until 2010 and was the pitching coach for the Birmingham Barons, the White Sox AA affiliate, through 2015.
