= Tom Filer =

American baseball player (born 1956)

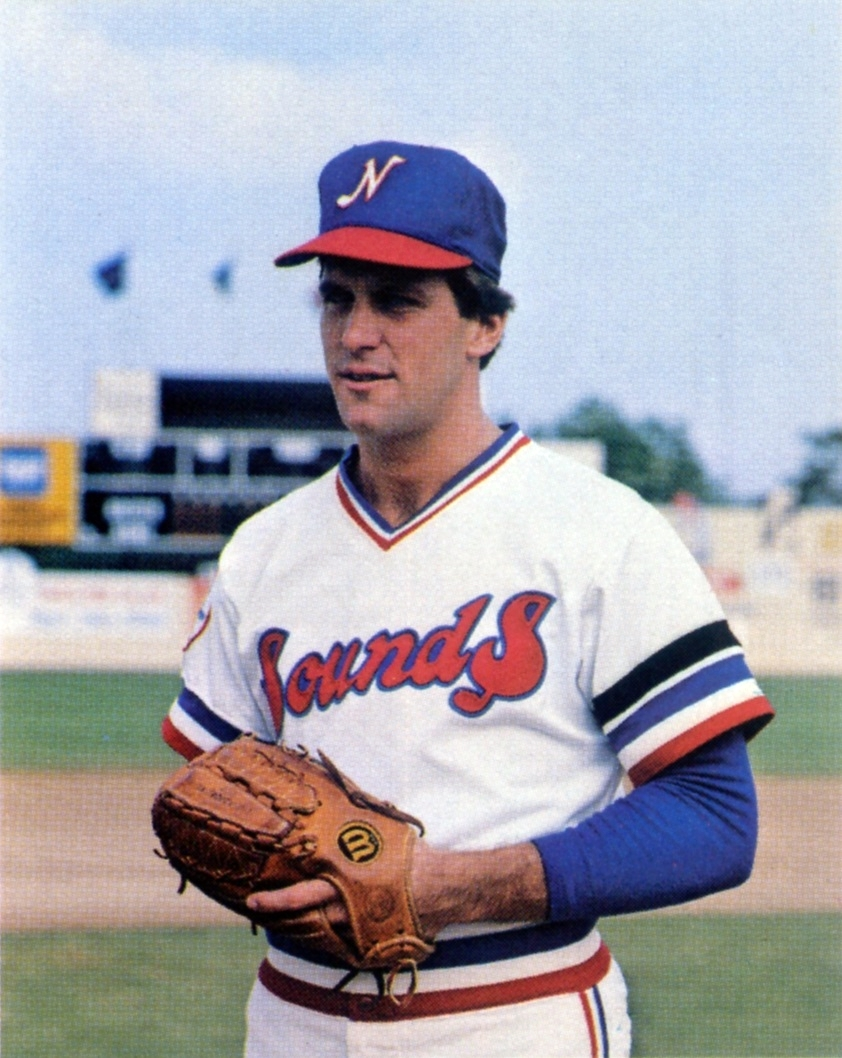
- Filer with the Nashville Sounds in 1980
- Pitcher
- Born: December 1, 1956 (age 69); Philadelphia, Pennsylvania, U.S.
- Batted: Right Threw: Right

MLB debut
- June 8, 1982, for the Chicago Cubs

Last MLB appearance
- August 7, 1992, for the New York Mets

MLB statistics
- Win–loss record: 22–17
- Earned run average: 4.25
- Strikeouts: 115
- Stats at Baseball Reference

Teams
- Chicago Cubs (1982); Toronto Blue Jays (1985); Milwaukee Brewers (1988–1990); New York Mets (1992)

Thomas Carson Filer (born December 1, 1956) is an American former professional baseball player and coach. He played in Major League Baseball as a right-handed pitcher between 1982 and 1992 for the Chicago Cubs, Toronto Blue Jays, Milwaukee Brewers, and the New York Mets.

== Career ==
He was signed by the New York Yankees as an amateur free agent in 1978. Filer played his first professional season with their Class-A (Short Season) Oneonta Yankees in 1979, and his last with the Mets' Triple-A Norfolk Tides in 1993. He graduated from La Salle University with a B.S. in Marketing. He is currently the Assistant Pitching Coordinator for the Pittsburgh Pirates.
