= Lou Thornton =

American baseball player (born 1963)

- Outfielder
- Born: April 26, 1963 (age 63); Montgomery, Alabama, U.S.
- Batted: Left Threw: Right

MLB debut
- April 8, 1985, for the Toronto Blue Jays

Last MLB appearance
- April 24, 1990, for the New York Mets

MLB statistics
- Batting average: .247
- Home runs: 1
- Runs batted in: 9
- Stats at Baseball Reference

Teams
- Toronto Blue Jays (1985, 1987–1988); New York Mets (1989–1990)

Louis Thornton (born April 26, 1963) is an American former Major League Baseball outfielder and pinch runner. He played parts of five seasons in the major leagues between 1985 and 1990.

== Sources ==
- Career statistics from Baseball Reference · Baseball Reference (Minors) · Retrosheet · Baseball Almanac
