= Chris Codiroli =

American baseball player (born 1958)

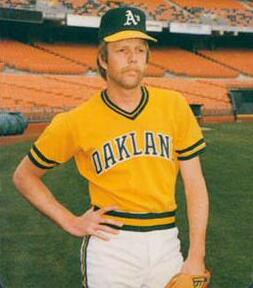
- Codiroli c. 1984
- Pitcher
- Born: March 26, 1958 (age 68); Oxnard, California, U.S.
- Batted: Right Threw: Right

MLB debut
- September 11, 1982, for the Oakland Athletics

Last MLB appearance
- October 2, 1990, for the Kansas City Royals

MLB statistics
- Win–loss record: 38–47
- Earned run average: 4.87
- Strikeouts: 312
- Stats at Baseball Reference

Teams
- Oakland Athletics (1982–1987); Cleveland Indians (1988); Kansas City Royals (1990)

Christopher Allen Codiroli (born March 26, 1958) is an American former professional baseball player who pitched in the Major Leagues from 1982 to 1988 and 1990.

He pitched at Archbishop Mitty High School in San Jose, California but, after receiving no scholarship offers to play college baseball, enrolled at San Jose State University. At San Jose State, his father talked him into trying out for the baseball team. As a walk-on, he led the Northern California Baseball Association in earned run average. He then transferred to San Jose City College, from which he was drafted by the Detroit Tigers.

In 144 career games in Major League Baseball, he had 38 wins, 47 losses, 312 strikeouts, and a 4.87 earned run average. Codiroli won a career high 14 games in 1985. He also led the A's in wins that year.
