= Jim Acker =

American baseball player (born 1958)

- Pitcher
- Born: September 24, 1958 (age 67); Freer, Texas, U.S.
- Batted: Right Threw: Right

MLB debut
- April 7, 1983, for the Toronto Blue Jays

Last MLB appearance
- June 14, 1992, for the Seattle Mariners

MLB statistics
- Win–loss record: 33–49
- Earned run average: 3.97
- Strikeouts: 482
- Stats at Baseball Reference

Teams
- Toronto Blue Jays (1983–1986); Atlanta Braves (1986–1989); Toronto Blue Jays (1989–1991); Seattle Mariners (1992)

James Justin Acker (born September 24, 1958) is an American former Major League Baseball pitcher who played from 1983 to 1992. He played college baseball at the University of Texas.

Acker was drafted in the first round by the Atlanta Braves in the 1980 Major League Baseball draft and was a member of the Toronto Blue Jays teams that won the 1985, 1989, and 1991 American League East division. He also played for the Seattle Mariners.

== Professional career ==
=== Toronto Blue Jays ===
He was drafted by the Atlanta Braves in the first round (21st selection) of the 1980 Major League Baseball draft. On December 6, 1982, he was drafted by the Toronto Blue Jays from the Atlanta Braves in the 1982 Rule 5 Draft. He pitched for the Jays for four years performing mainly as a relief pitcher.

=== Atlanta Braves ===
On July 6, 1986, Acker was traded by the Blue Jays to the Atlanta Braves for pitcher Joe Johnson. He spent four years with the Braves, compiling a record of 7–27 with 16 saves and a 3.71 ERA in 169 games.

On August 24, 1989, Acker was traded by the Braves back to the Toronto Blue Jays for Francisco Cabrera and Tony Castillo.

=== Toronto Blue Jays (second tenure) ===
Acker spent part of the 1989 year and the complete 1990 and 1991 seasons back with the Blue Jays. In his entire seven-year career with the Jays he compiled a record of 26–22 with 14 saves and an ERA of 4.07 in 281 games. On October 31, 1991, he was granted free agency.

=== Seattle Mariners ===
Acker signed as a free agent with the Seattle Mariners on February 2, 1992. He appeared in 17 games with the Mariners, compiling a 5.28 ERA, before he was released on July 21, 1992.

=== Retirement ===
Acker ended his baseball career after six appearances with the Oklahoma City 89ers, the Texas Rangers Triple-A affiliate, in 1993.

=== Career statistics ===
In 467 major league games, Acker compiled a 33–49 record with 32 games started, 159 games finished, 30 saves, 329 walks, 482 strikeouts and a 3.97 ERA.

He was an excellent fielding pitcher, recording a .992 fielding percentage with only two errors in 236 total chances in 904.1 innings pitched. Both his miscues were against the Milwaukee Brewers on June 25, 1984, and September 24, 1989.
