= Glen Cook (baseball) =

American baseball player (born 1959)

- Pitcher
- Born: September 8, 1959 (age 66); Buffalo, New York, U.S.
- Batted: Right Threw: Right

MLB debut
- June 23, 1985, for the Texas Rangers

Last MLB appearance
- October 2, 1985, for the Texas Rangers

MLB statistics
- Win–loss record: 2–3
- Earned run average: 9.45
- Strikeouts: 19
- Stats at Baseball Reference

Teams
- Texas Rangers (1985)

Glen Patrick Cook (born September 8, 1959) is an American former baseball player who played in Major League Baseball as a pitcher for one season. He pitched in nine games, starting seven of them for the Texas Rangers during the 1985 Texas Rangers season.

Growing up in Tonawanda, New York, Cook said his father "pushed baseball on" him and his brothers to the point that he did not allow the family to take vacations. Cook told the Fort Worth Star-Telegram, however, that he was glad that his dad pushed him so hard. Cook attended Tonawanda High School and Ithaca College where he had a 7–0 record for the Ithaca Bombers baseball team which won the 1980 NCAA Division III baseball tournament.

He was promoted to the majors on June 20, 1985, to fill a vacancy in the starting rotation left after the Rangers traded away Frank Tanana. At the time, his wife, Linda Ann, formerly of Lawton, Oklahoma, was expecting a baby.
