= Tom Waddell (baseball) =

Scottish baseball player (1958–2019)

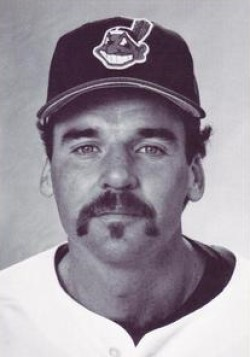
- Pitcher
- Born: September 17, 1958; Dundee, Scotland
- Died: September 14, 2019 (aged 60); Tucson, Arizona, U.S.
- Batted: Right Threw: Right

MLB debut
- April 15, 1984, for the Cleveland Indians

Last MLB appearance
- April 20, 1987, for the Cleveland Indians

MLB statistics
- Pitching Record: 15–11
- Earned run average: 4.30
- Strikeouts: 118
- Stats at Baseball Reference

Teams
- Cleveland Indians (1984–1985, 1987)

Thomas David Waddell (September 17, 1958 – September 14, 2019) was a Scottish Major League Baseball pitcher. One of only eight Scotland natives to ever be a major league ballplayer, he pitched for the Cleveland Indians from 1984 to 1985, and again in 1987.

Waddell grew up in Closter, New Jersey and attended Northern Valley Regional High School at Demarest.

== Baseball career ==
The right-hander was signed by the Atlanta Braves as an amateur free agent out of Manhattan College in 1981. Hank Aaron was present at Waddell's tryout and credited with signing the young pitcher. After three seasons in their farm system, he was drafted by the Indians in the 1983 rule 5 draft. He made his major league debut on April 15, 1984, against the Baltimore Orioles, facing only two batters and giving up a game tying sacrifice fly and a single. For the season, Waddell went 7–4 with a 3.06 earned run average, 59 strikeouts and six saves in 58 appearances for the Indians, setting a club record for relief appearances by a rookie.

In 1985, Waddell was 4–5 with a 3.88 ERA and nine saves out of the tribe's bullpen when Cleveland manager Pat Corrales converted him into a starter. In his first major league start, Waddell pitched six plus innings to earn the win over the New York Yankees, and snap a twelve-game winning streak for Yankees ace Ron Guidry. For the season, he made nine starts, including a 7-hit complete game win over Dave Stieb and the Toronto Blue Jays on August 19.

His season was cut short when he had surgery to remove bone spurs in his right elbow on September 23. He was slated to be part of the starting rotation for 1986 before suffering a setback during Spring training that limited him to only three rehab appearances for Cleveland's triple A affiliate.

He was unsuccessful in a brief 1987 comeback bid, going 0–1 with a 14.29 ERA in six games with the Indians. He signed a minor league contract with the Montreal Expos in 1988, and went 3–2 with a 2.95 ERA splitting the season between their double and triple A affiliates. He split the 1989 season between the Expos' and Milwaukee Brewers' farm system before retiring.

| W | L | PCT | ERA | G | GS | CG | SV | IP | H | ER | R | HR | BB | K | WP | HBP | Fld% |
| 15 | 11 | .577 | 4.30 | 113 | 9 | 1 | 15 | 215.1 | 179 | 103 | 106 | 33 | 83 | 118 | 2 | 3 | 1.000 |

== Post-baseball career ==
Waddell became a U.S. citizen in 1990. He held several corporate jobs in Texas and Arizona, including Intuit, the software company that developed Quickbooks and Turbo Tax. Waddell died of cancer in 2019.
