= Bob James (baseball) =

American baseball player (born 1958)

- Pitcher
- Born: August 15, 1958 (age 67); Glendale, California, U.S.
- Batted: Right Threw: Right

MLB debut
- September 7, 1978, for the Montreal Expos

Last MLB appearance
- October 2, 1987, for the Chicago White Sox

MLB statistics
- Win–loss record: 24–26
- Earned run average: 3.80
- Strikeouts: 340
- Saves: 73
- Stats at Baseball Reference

Teams
- Montreal Expos (1978–1979, 1982); Detroit Tigers (1982–1983); Montreal Expos (1983–1984); Chicago White Sox (1985–1987)

Robert Harvey James (born August 15, 1958), is an American former professional baseball pitcher. He played in Major League Baseball primarily as a relief pitcher from 1978-1987.

== Career ==
James was the first round draft pick in 1976 by the Montreal Expos out of Verdugo Hills High School, where he had been converted from a catcher to a pitcher, and joined the major league team in 1978 when he was just twenty years old. In 1982 he was traded to the Detroit Tigers for a player to be named later, and was himself returned to the Expos as that player in 1983. On December 7, 1984, James was traded to the Chicago White Sox for Vance Law. The following season, he saved 32 games for the White Sox, second in the American League behind Dan Quisenberry. James pitched two more years for the White Sox before being released.
