= Joe Cowley (baseball) =

American baseball player (born 1958)

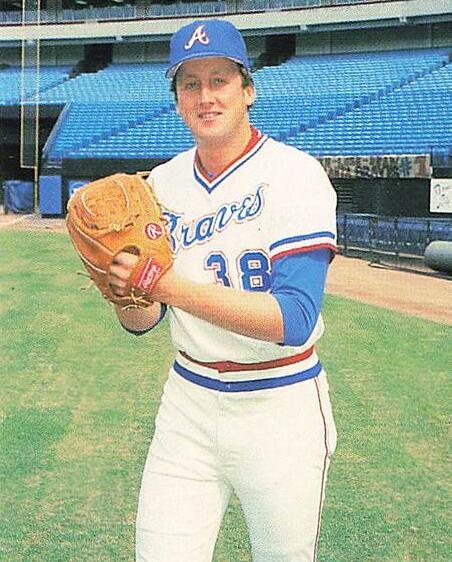
- Cowley with the Atlanta Braves c. 1982
- Pitcher
- Born: August 15, 1958 (age 67); Lexington, Kentucky, U.S.
- Batted: Right Threw: Right

MLB debut
- April 13, 1982, for the Atlanta Braves

Last MLB appearance
- May 3, 1987, for the Philadelphia Phillies

MLB statistics
- Win–loss record: 33–25
- Earned run average: 4.20
- Strikeouts: 332
- Stats at Baseball Reference

Teams
- Atlanta Braves (1982); New York Yankees (1984–1985); Chicago White Sox (1986); Philadelphia Phillies (1987)

Career highlights and awards
- Pitched a no-hitter on September 19, 1986

Joseph Alan Cowley (born August 15, 1958) is an American former professional baseball pitcher, who played in Major League Baseball (MLB) for the Atlanta Braves (1982), New York Yankees (1984–1985), Chicago White Sox (1986), and Philadelphia Phillies (1987). On September 19, 1986, Cowley threw a no-hitter for the White Sox against the California Angels.

== Early career ==
Cowley graduated from Lafayette High School in Lexington, Kentucky and was not selected in the 1976 Major League Baseball draft. He attended a tryout camp in Huntington, West Virginia and earned a contract with the Atlanta Braves.

== 1986: Strikeout record and no-hitter ==
On May 28, 1986, Cowley set the then-major league record for striking out the most consecutive batters to start a game when he struck out the first seven Texas Rangers that he faced. Despite the feat, Cowley lost the game, surrendering five earned runs in less than five innings before being removed.

On September 19 of that same year, Cowley pitched a 7-1 no-hitter against the California Angels at Anaheim Stadium. After the eighth inning, with Cowley just three outs away, approximately one-third of the 28,647 fans in attendance left the stadium, in keeping with the perception that sports fans in Southern California are more concerned with avoiding traffic than watching games. The no-hitter was also memorable because Cowley threw as many balls as he did strikes (69), walking seven men and surrendering one earned run. After the game, Angels first baseman Wally Joyner said: "Not to put Joe Cowley down, but it wasn't impressive."

Cowley did not win again in 1986, and after four winless starts in 1987, was released by the Phillies. Cowley thus became the only pitcher in MLB history never to win another game after pitching a no-hitter.

== See also ==
- List of Major League Baseball no-hitters

| Preceded by Mike Witt | No-hitter pitcher September 19, 1986 | Succeeded by Mike Scott |
