= 2014 Major League Baseball postseason =

2014 Major League Baseball playoffs

Tournament details
- Dates: September 30 – October 29, 2014
- Teams: 10

Final positions
- Champions: San Francisco Giants (8th title)
- Runners-up: Kansas City Royals

Tournament statistics
- Most HRs: Mike Moustakas (KC) (5)
- Most SBs: Alex Gordon (KC) (4)
- Most Ks (as pitcher): Madison Bumgarner (SF) (45)

Awards
- MVP: Madison Bumgarner (SF)

The 2014 Major League Baseball postseason was the playoff tournament of Major League Baseball for the 2014 season. The winners of the Division Series would move on to the League Championship Series to determine the pennant winners that face each other in the World Series.

In the American League, the Detroit Tigers made their fourth straight postseason appearance (and their last until 2024), the Oakland Athletics made their third straight appearance, the Los Angeles Angels of Anaheim made their first postseason appearance since 2009, the Baltimore Orioles returned for the second time in three years, and the Kansas City Royals ended almost three decades of futility by returning to the postseason for the first time since 1985, ending what was the longest postseason appearance drought in North American sports at the time.

In the National League, the St. Louis Cardinals made their fourth straight postseason appearance, the Los Angeles Dodgers and Pittsburgh Pirates made their second straight appearance, the Washington Nationals returned for the second time in three years, and the San Francisco Giants made their third postseason appearance in the past five years.

2014 marks the most recent postseason appearance for the Angels, who currently hold the longest active postseason drought in the majors, and this remains the most recent edition of the postseason to feature both teams from the Greater Los Angeles area. It is also the only postseason since interleague play began in 1997 to see all teams in one league and their respective interleague rivals in the other enter the playoffs. This was also the last edition of the postseason to feature both teams from the San Francisco Bay Area, as the Oakland Athletics would move to Las Vegas. This was also the last edition of the postseason until 2025 to not feature either team from Texas.

The postseason began on September 30, and ended on October 29, with the Giants narrowly defeating the Royals in seven games in the 2014 World Series. It was the Giants' eighth title in franchise history. The 2014 Giants became the first fifth-seeded team to win a World Series title.

== Playoff seeds ==
American League Teams National League Teams

The following teams qualified for the postseason:

=== American League ===
1. Los Angeles Angels of Anaheim – 98–64, AL West champions
2. Baltimore Orioles – 96–66, AL East champions
3. Detroit Tigers – 90–72, AL Central champions
4. Kansas City Royals – 89–73
5. Oakland Athletics – 88–74

=== National League ===
1. Washington Nationals – 96–66, NL East champions
2. Los Angeles Dodgers – 94–68, NL West champions
3. St. Louis Cardinals – 90–72, NL Central champions
4. Pittsburgh Pirates – 88–74 (4–2 head-to-head record vs. SF)
5. San Francisco Giants – 88–74 (2–4 head-to-head record vs. PIT)

== Playoff bracket ==
Wild Card Game (ALWC, NLWC)
4	Kansas City	1
5	Oakland	0
4	Pittsburgh	0
5	San Francisco	1

Division Series (ALDS, NLDS)
1	LA Angels	0
4	Kansas City	3
American League
2	Baltimore	3
3	Detroit	0
1	Washington	1
5	San Francisco	3
National League
2	LA Dodgers	1
3	St. Louis	3

League Championship Series (ALCS, NLCS)
4	Kansas City	4
2	Baltimore	0
5	San Francisco	4
3	St. Louis	1

World Series
AL4	Kansas City	3
NL5	San Francisco	4

== American League Wild Card ==
=== (4) Kansas City Royals vs. (5) Oakland Athletics ===
September 30, 2014 7:08 pm (CDT) at Kauffman Stadium in Kansas City, Missouri, 82 °F (28 °C), clear
Team	1	2	3	4	5	6	7	8	9	10	11	12	R	H	E
Oakland	2	0	0	0	0	5	0	0	0	0	0	1	8	13	0
Kansas City	1	0	2	0	0	0	0	3	1	0	0	2	9	15	0
WP: Jason Frasor (1–0) LP: Dan Otero (0–1); Home runs: OAK: Brandon Moss 2 (2); KC: None; Attendance: 40,502; Boxscore

This was the second postseason meeting between the Royals and Athletics. They last met in the ALDS in 1981, which was won by the Athletics in a sweep. The Royals mounted an improbable comeback to defeat the Athletics and advance to their first ever ALDS.

The Athletics led 7-3 going into the bottom of the eighth, but the Royals scored four runs across the eighth and ninth to force extras. The Athletics regained the lead in the top of the twelfth, but in the bottom of the inning, but the Royals rallied again and won off of back-to-back RBI singles from Christian Colón and Salvador Perez. This was the first playoff series won by the Royals since the 1985 World Series.

This marked the first of three straight losses in the Wild Card round for the Athletics. In 2018 they would lose to the New York Yankees, and in 2019 they lost to the Tampa Bay Rays.

== National League Wild Card ==
=== (4) Pittsburgh Pirates vs. (5) San Francisco Giants ===
October 1, 2014 8:09 pm (EDT) at PNC Park, Pittsburgh, Pennsylvania, 63 °F (17 °C), cloudy
Team	1	2	3	4	5	6	7	8	9	R	H	E
San Francisco	0	0	0	4	0	1	2	1	0	8	11	2
Pittsburgh	0	0	0	0	0	0	0	0	0	0	4	0
WP: Madison Bumgarner (1–0) LP: Edinson Vólquez (0–1); Home runs: SF: Brandon Crawford (1); PIT: None; Attendance: 40,629; Boxscore

This was the second postseason meeting between the Giants and Pirates. They last met in the NLCS in 1971, which the Pirates won in four games en route to a World Series title. Madison Bumgarner pitched a four-hit complete game shutout as the Giants blew out the Pirates and advanced to the NLDS for the third time in five years.

== American League Division Series ==
=== (1) Los Angeles Angels of Anaheim vs. (4) Kansas City Royals ===
Kansas City won the series, 3–0.

Game	Date	Score	Location	Time	Attendance
1	October 2	Kansas City Royals – 3, Los Angeles Angels of Anaheim – 2 (11)	Angel Stadium	4:05	45,321
2	October 3	Kansas City Royals – 4, Los Angeles Angels of Anaheim – 1 (11)	Angel Stadium	3:48	45,361
3	October 5	Los Angeles Angels of Anaheim – 3, Kansas City Royals – 8	Kauffman Stadium	3:38	40,657

The Royals unexpectedly swept the top-seeded Angels to return to the ALCS for the first time since 1985.

The Royals stole Game 1 in Anaheim after an extra-inning grind, thanks to a go-ahead solo home run from Mike Moustakas in the top of the eleventh. Game 2 was yet another extra-inning grind, but the Royals prevailed in the top of the eleventh again thanks to a go-ahead two-run home run from Eric Hosmer. Back at home for Game 3, the Royals blew out the Angels to complete the sweep.

To date, this is the last postseason appearance by the Angels, who now hold the longest postseason appearance drought in the MLB.

=== (2) Baltimore Orioles vs. (3) Detroit Tigers ===
Baltimore won the series, 3–0.

Game	Date	Score	Location	Time	Attendance
1	October 2	Detroit Tigers – 3, Baltimore Orioles – 12	Oriole Park at Camden Yards	3:42	47,842
2	October 3	Detroit Tigers – 6, Baltimore Orioles – 7	Oriole Park at Camden Yards	3:41	48,058
3	October 5	Baltimore Orioles – 2, Detroit Tigers – 1	Comerica Park	3:41	43,013

The Orioles handily swept the Tigers to advance to the ALCS for the first time since 1997.

In Game 1, the Orioles blew out the Tigers by 9 runs. In Game 2, the Tigers possessed a 6–3 lead going into the bottom of the eighth, however the Orioles had the bases loaded for former Tiger Delmon Young, who in a 6–4 game unloaded the bases with a go-ahead three-run double to put the Orioles in the lead for good. Baltimore's Zack Britton secured the win for the Orioles in the top of the ninth, and the O's were now up 2–0 in the series headed to Detroit. In Game 3, the Orioles held off a late rally by the Tigers to complete the sweep and advance to the ALCS, handing the Tigers their first ever defeat in the ALDS. In their previous four appearances, the Tigers advanced to the ALCS each time. Game 3 was Miguel Cabrera’s final postseason game.

As of 2026, this is the most recent playoff game win and playoff series win by the Orioles.

== National League Division Series ==
=== (1) Washington Nationals vs. (5) San Francisco Giants ===
San Francisco won the series, 3–1.

Game	Date	Score	Location	Time	Attendance
1	October 3	San Francisco Giants – 3, Washington Nationals – 2	Nationals Park	3:55	44,035
2	October 4	San Francisco Giants – 2, Washington Nationals – 1 (18)	Nationals Park	6:23	44,035
3	October 6	Washington Nationals – 4, San Francisco Giants – 1	AT&T Park	2:47	43,627
4	October 7	Washington Nationals – 2, San Francisco Giants – 3	AT&T Park	3:15	43,464

The Giants defeated the Nationals in four games to reach the NLCS for the third time in five years.

Sergio Romo and Santiago Casilla stopped a late rally by the Nationals as the Giants took Game 1. Game 2 was a long, difficult contest that remained tied at one going into the top of the eighteenth, when San Francisco's Brandon Belt cracked a solo home run to put the Giants in the lead for good, putting the Giants up 2–0 in the series going to San Francisco. Game 3 was a pitcher's duel between Washington's Doug Fister and San Francisco's Madison Bumgarner, which Fister ended up winning as the Nationals won 4–1 to avoid a sweep, handing Bumgarner his only loss of the entire postseason. In Game 4, Bryce Harper tied the game with a solo homer in the top of the seventh, but a wild pitch by Aaron Barrett that scored Joe Panik in the bottom of the seventh put the Giants ahead for good as they secured a spot in the NLCS.

=== (2) Los Angeles Dodgers vs. (3) St. Louis Cardinals ===
St. Louis won the series, 3–1.

Game	Date	Score	Location	Time	Attendance
1	October 3	St. Louis Cardinals – 10, Los Angeles Dodgers – 9	Dodger Stadium	3:57	54,265
2	October 4	St. Louis Cardinals – 2, Los Angeles Dodgers – 3	Dodger Stadium	3:27	54,599
3	October 6	Los Angeles Dodgers – 1, St. Louis Cardinals – 3	Busch Stadium	3:04	47,574
4	October 7	Los Angeles Dodgers – 2, St. Louis Cardinals – 3	Busch Stadium	3:05	46,906

This was the fifth postseason meeting in the history of the Cardinals-Dodgers rivalry (1985, 2004, 2009, 2013). The Cardinals again defeated the Dodgers to advance to the NLCS for the fourth year in a row.

The Cardinals prevailed in a Game 1 slugfest on the road after trailing 6–1. In Game 2, Zack Greinke pitched seven solid innings, but didn’t get the win as it went to relief pitcher Brandon League, who ended a late rally by the Cardinals as the Dodgers evened the series headed to St. Louis. In Game 3, John Lackey pitched seven strong innings and Kolten Wong hit a two-run homer in the bottom of the seventh to give the Cardinals a lead they wouldn’t let go of as they regained the series lead. In Game 4, the Dodgers led 2-0 after six innings of play, but it was erased by Matt Adams, who hit a three-run homer in the bottom of the seventh to put the Cardinals in the lead for good as they closed out the series.

Both teams would meet once more in the Wild Card game in 2021, which was won by the Dodgers.

As of 2026, this is the last time the Cardinals defeated the Dodgers in the postseason.

== American League Championship Series ==
=== (2) Baltimore Orioles vs (4) Kansas City Royals ===
Kansas City won the series, 4–0.

Game	Date	Score	Location	Time	Attendance
1	October 10	Kansas City Royals – 8, Baltimore Orioles – 6 (10)	Oriole Park at Camden Yards	4:37	47,124
2	October 11	Kansas City Royals – 6, Baltimore Orioles – 4	Oriole Park at Camden Yards	4:17	46,912
3	October 14*	Baltimore Orioles – 1, Kansas City Royals – 2	Kauffman Stadium	2:55	40,183
4	October 15	Baltimore Orioles – 1, Kansas City Royals – 2	Kauffman Stadium	2:56	40,468

*: postponed from October 13 due to rain

This was the first postseason meeting between the Royals and Orioles. The Royals upset the Orioles in a sweep to return to the World Series for the first time since 1985.

Despite ending in a sweep, each game of the series was decided by two runs or less. In Game 1, the Royals prevailed in extras as Alex Gordon hit a solo home run that put them in the lead for good. Game 2 remained tied going into the ninth, when Alcides Escobar hit an RBI double that put the Royals in the lead for good as they took a 2–0 series lead heading to Kansas City. In Game 3, Billy Butler broke a 1-1 tie with a sacrifice fly that scored Nori Aoki, putting the Royals ahead for good as they took a commanding three games to none series lead. In Game 4, the Royals took the lead immediately with two runs scored in the bottom of the first due to an error by Baltimore’s Steve Pearce, and it was all they needed as they once again won by a 2-1 score to secure the pennant.

With the sweep, the 2014 Royals' postseason record improved to 8–0, surpassing the record set by the 1976 Cincinnati Reds, who went 7–0. The Royals would win the pennant again the next year, defeating the Toronto Blue Jays in six games en route to a World Series title.

The 2014 ALCS started a streak of playoff success for Kansas City-based teams over their Baltimore counterparts, as the NFL’s Kansas City Chiefs would defeat the Baltimore Ravens in the 2023–24 AFC Championship, and the Royals would once again sweep the Orioles in the Wild Card round of the 2024 postseason.

As of 2026, this is the Orioles’ most recent postseason appearance outside of the divisional round.

== National League Championship Series ==
=== (3) St. Louis Cardinals vs (5) San Francisco Giants ===
San Francisco won the series, 4–1.

Game	Date	Score	Location	Time	Attendance
1	October 11	San Francisco Giants – 3, St. Louis Cardinals – 0	Busch Stadium	3:23	47,201
2	October 12	San Francisco Giants – 4, St. Louis Cardinals – 5	Busch Stadium	3:41	46,262
3	October 14	St. Louis Cardinals – 4, San Francisco Giants – 5 (10)	AT&T Park	3:10	42,716
4	October 15	St. Louis Cardinals – 4, San Francisco Giants – 6	AT&T Park	3:53	43,147
5	October 16	St. Louis Cardinals – 3, San Francisco Giants – 6	AT&T Park	3:03	43,217

This was the fourth postseason meeting between the Cardinals and Giants (1987, 2002, 2012). The Giants defeated the defending National League champion Cardinals in five quick games to return to the World Series for the third time in five years (in the process denying a rematch of the 1985 World Series between the Cardinals and Royals).

Madison Bumgarner and the Giants bullpen pitched a combined four-hit shutout as the Giants won Game 1. In Game 2, with the game tied at four runs each, St. Louis' Kolten Wong evened the series for the Cardinals with a walk-off home run in the bottom of the ninth to even the series. In San Francisco for Game 3, the Giants prevailed thanks to a bunt by Gregor Blanco that scored the winning run in the bottom of the tenth. In Game 4, the Cardinals held a 4–3 lead going into the bottom of the sixth, until the Giants scored three unanswered runs to take the lead for good and go up 3–1 in the series. Game 5 remained tied at three going into the bottom of the ninth, until San Francisco's Travis Ishikawa won the pennant for the Giants with a walk-off three-run home run.

With the win, the Giants became the first fifth-seeded team to reach the World Series, and they improved their postseason record against the Cardinals to 3–1. As of 2026, this is the last time the Giants won the NL pennant.

The Cardinals returned to the NLCS one more time in 2019, but were swept by the eventual World Series champion Washington Nationals.

== 2014 World Series ==
=== (AL4) Kansas City Royals vs. (NL5) San Francisco Giants ===
San Francisco won the series, 4–3.

Game	Date	Score	Location	Time	Attendance
1	October 21	San Francisco Giants – 7, Kansas City Royals – 1	Kauffman Stadium	3:32	40,459
2	October 22	San Francisco Giants – 2, Kansas City Royals – 7	Kauffman Stadium	3:25	40,446
3	October 24	Kansas City Royals – 3, San Francisco Giants – 2	AT&T Park	3:15	43,020
4	October 25	Kansas City Royals – 4, San Francisco Giants – 11	AT&T Park	4:00	43,066
5	October 26	Kansas City Royals – 0, San Francisco Giants – 5	AT&T Park	3:09	43,087
6	October 28	San Francisco Giants – 0, Kansas City Royals – 10	Kauffman Stadium	3:21	40,372
7	October 29	San Francisco Giants – 3, Kansas City Royals – 2	Kauffman Stadium	3:10	40,535

This was the sixth World Series in which the Giants faced a team from the current American League Central Division (1917, 1924, 1933, 1954, 2012), as well as the first World Series since 2002 to feature two Wild Card teams. The Giants narrowly defeated the Royals in seven games to win their third title in five years, capping off a dynasty and becoming the lowest seeded team in postseason history to win a World Series.

In the first World Series game played in Kansas City in almost three decades, Madison Bumgarner pitched seven solid innings as the Giants blew out the Royals. In Game 2, the Royals blew out the Giants in response to even the series headed to San Francisco. The Royals’ victory in Game 2 ended a seven-game win streak in World Series play for the Giants dating back to Game 4 of the 2010 World Series. Jeremy Guthrie pitched five innings of shutout ball and the Royals bullpen held off a rally by the Giants to win Game 3 and take the lead in the series. In Game 4, the Giants blew out the Royals again to even the series. Bumgarner then pitched a four-hit complete game shutout in Game 5 as the Giants took a 3–2 series lead headed back to Kansas City, becoming the first pitcher to record a complete game shutout in the World Series since Josh Beckett in 2003. In Game 6, Yordano Ventura pitched seven shutout innings as the Royals blew out the Giants 10-0 to force a seventh game, handing the Giants their most lopsided defeat in the Fall Classic since Game 5 of the 1951 World Series.

Game 7 was the most memorable contest of the series. Tim Hudson started for the Giants and lasted just over an inning, as he allowed two runs before giving way to veteran southpaw Jeremy Affeldt. The game was tied at two going into the top of the fourth inning, until the Giants scored one run to take the lead for good. Then, Giants' manager Bruce Bochy pulled Affeldt in favor of Bumgarner, who was only on two days' rest. Bumgarner pitched five shutout innings in relief, and while the Royals had a runner on third in the bottom of the ninth, the Giants prevailed due to a pop-up foul ball by Kansas City's Salvador Perez, which was caught by Pablo Sandoval to clinch the title for the Giants. This was the first World Series Game 7 won by the Giants in franchise history.

The 2014 Giants became the first team since the Pittsburgh Pirates in 1979 to win a World Series Game 7 on the road, which started a streak of what is currently five consecutive World Series Game 7s being won by the road team. The 2014 Giants became the first fifth-seeded team to win the World Series. With the win, the Giants' record in the World Series against the AL Central improved to 4–2, and have beaten every AL Central team in the World Series except the Chicago White Sox, who they lost to in the 1917 World Series. As of 2026, this is the Giants' most recent World Series win and appearance, and their last postseason appearance beyond the divisional round.

The Royals returned to the World Series the next year, defeating the New York Mets in five games to end their three-decade long World Series drought.

== Broadcasting ==
This was first year of eight-year U.S. TV contracts with ESPN, Fox Sports, and TBS. In even-numbered years starting this postseason, ESPN aired the National League Wild Card Game, Fox Sports 1 and MLB Network split the National League Division Series, the Fox broadcast network and Fox Sports 1 split the National League Championship Series, and TBS televised all three rounds of the American League playoffs. In odd-numbered years starting in 2014, TBS televised the National League playoffs while the other networks aired the American League games. The new deals also maintained the Fox broadcast network's streak of airing consecutive World Series since 2000.
