= 1985 National League Championship Series =

17th edition of Major League Baseball's National League Championship Series

Team (Wins)	Managers	Season
St. Louis Cardinals (4)	Whitey Herzog	101–61, .623, GA: 3
Los Angeles Dodgers (2)	Tommy Lasorda	95–67, .586, GA: 5½
- Dates: October 9–16
- MVP: Ozzie Smith (St. Louis)
- Umpires: Dick Stello (crew chief); Bruce Froemming; John McSherry; Terry Tata; Paul Runge; Jerry Crawford

Broadcast
- Television: NBC
- TV announcers: Vin Scully and Joe Garagiola
- Radio: CBS; KMOX (STL); KABC (LA)
- Radio announcers: Brent Musburger and Johnny Bench (CBS); Jack Buck and Mike Shannon (KMOX); Jerry Doggett and Ross Porter (KABC)

The 1985 National League Championship Series was a best-of-seven playoff series in Major League Baseball’s 1985 postseason played between the St. Louis Cardinals and Los Angeles Dodgers from October 9–16. It was the 17th NLCS and the first played under the new best-of-seven format. In previous years, the NLCS had been settled by a best-of-five format. This series is best known for Ozzie Smith's dramatic walk-off home run in Game 5. This is the second consecutive NLCS where a team overcame a 2–0 series deficit to win the series after the Padres did so in the best-of-five 1984 NLCS.

Dodger announcer Vin Scully and former Cardinal player Joe Garagiola called the games for NBC. Both were announcers on the year-long Game of the Week.

== Background ==
The Cardinals made it to the series by winning 101 games and edging the New York Mets in the National League East. The Dodgers were led by Pedro Guerrero, and their talented pitching staff with a team ERA of 2.96. They beat the Cincinnati Reds by 5 1/2 games. This was nearly a NLCS match-up in 1982, but the Dodgers lost their National League West lead in late September and were ultimately knocked out of the postseason on the last day of the season by the San Francisco Giants, thanks to a Joe Morgan 7th inning three-run home run.

The Dodgers held home field advantage, the second consecutive year the Western division champion had it. From 1969-84, the East winner had home field advantage for the NLCS in odd-numbered years and the West in even-numbered years. The West had the home field advantage again the next year as well before the East-West alternation resumed in 1987, continuing through 1993.

== Summary ==
=== Los Angeles Dodgers vs. St. Louis Cardinals ===
St. Louis won the series, 4–2.

Game	Date	Score	Location	Time	Attendance
1	October 9	St. Louis Cardinals – 1, Los Angeles Dodgers – 4	Dodger Stadium	2:42	55,270
2	October 10	St. Louis Cardinals – 2, Los Angeles Dodgers – 8	Dodger Stadium	3:04	55,222
3	October 12	Los Angeles Dodgers – 2, St. Louis Cardinals – 4	Busch Stadium (II)	3:21	53,708
4	October 13	Los Angeles Dodgers – 2, St. Louis Cardinals – 12	Busch Stadium (II)	2:47	53,708
5	October 14	Los Angeles Dodgers – 2, St. Louis Cardinals – 3	Busch Stadium (II)	2:56	53,706
6	October 16	St. Louis Cardinals – 7, Los Angeles Dodgers – 5	Dodger Stadium	3:32	55,208

== Game summaries ==
=== Game 1 ===
Wednesday, October 9, 1985, at Dodger Stadium in Los Angeles, California

Team	1	2	3	4	5	6	7	8	9	R	H	E
St. Louis	0	0	0	0	0	0	1	0	0	1	8	1
Los Angeles	0	0	0	1	0	3	0	0	X	4	8	0
WP: Fernando Valenzuela (1–0) LP: John Tudor (0–1) Sv: Tom Niedenfuer (1)

The opening contest in Los Angeles pitted Dodgers screwballer Fernando Valenzuela against the Cardinals' 21-game winner, John Tudor. The pitchers matched zeroes through the first three innings, but in the bottom of the fourth an error by Terry Pendleton allowed Bill Madlock to reach first. After stealing second, Madlock came home on a Guerrero single to give the Dodgers a 1–0 lead. In the Dodgers' sixth, Madlock struck again when he doubled and then scored on a single by Mike Scioscia. Prior to Scioscia's single, the Cardinals had intentionally walked Guerrero, who later scored on a bunt by Candy Maldonado. A double by Steve Sax scored Maldonado, and Tudor got the hook. Ken Dayley ended the inning with a strikeout of Valenzuela, but the Dodgers had a 4–0 lead en route to a 4–1 victory with the Cardinals scoring the only run in the seventh on Tito Landrum's RBI single with two on. The win gave the Dodgers a 1–0 lead in the best-of-seven series.

=== Game 2 ===
Thursday, October 10, 1985, at Dodger Stadium in Los Angeles, California

Team	1	2	3	4	5	6	7	8	9	R	H	E
St. Louis	0	0	1	0	0	0	0	0	1	2	8	1
Los Angeles	0	0	3	2	1	2	0	0	X	8	13	1
WP: Orel Hershiser (1–0) LP: Joaquín Andújar (0–1); Home runs: STL: None; LAD: Greg Brock (1)

In Game 2, another Cardinal 20-game winner, Joaquín Andújar, squared off against the Dodgers' new ace, Orel Hershiser, who had compiled a 19–3 record during the regular season and had not lost at home. After two scoreless innings, the Cardinals scored first when batting champion (and eventual National League MVP) Willie McGee singled, went to second on a walk to Tommy Herr, and scored on a wild pitch by Hershiser to give the Cardinals their first lead of the series. In the bottom of the third, Sax singled for the Dodgers. Andujar had Sax picked off first, but a throwing error allowed him to scamper all the way to third with one out. He then scored on a single by Hershiser, who would score himself on Ken Landreaux's double. The hot-hitting Madlock then singled Landreaux home, giving the Dodgers a 3–1 lead.

In the next inning, Scioscia singled and scored on Greg Brock's two-run home run to give the Dodgers a 5–1 lead. Next inning, the Dodgers extended their lead to 6–1 on Mike Marshall's RBI single with two on that knocked Andujar out of the game. In the sixth, Ricky Horton allowed a two-out double and walk, then back-to-back RBI singles by Bill Madlock and Pedro Guerrero off of Bill Campbell made it 8–1 Dodgers. In the ninth, Hershiser allowed a leadoff single and walk, then two outs later, Vince Coleman's RBI single made it 8–2 Dodgers before Willie McGee grounded out to finish Hershiser's complete game and give the Dodgers a 2–0 series lead heading to St. Louis.

=== Game 3 ===
Saturday, October 12, 1985, at Busch Stadium (II) in St. Louis, Missouri

Team	1	2	3	4	5	6	7	8	9	R	H	E
Los Angeles	0	0	0	1	0	0	1	0	0	2	7	2
St. Louis	2	2	0	0	0	0	0	0	X	4	8	0
WP: Danny Cox (1–0) LP: Bob Welch (0–1) Sv: Ken Dayley (1); Home runs: LAD: None; STL: Tom Herr (1)

In past years, a 2–0 hole would have occasioned a must-win game, but the Cardinals still had a little breathing room due to the best-of-seven nature of the series. They did, however, need a win to get back on track in the series, and they got it with a 4–2 win behind Danny Cox to cut the Dodgers' series lead to 2–1. The Cardinals got roaring quickly when leadoff hitter Vince Coleman singled and stole second. After a walk to McGee, Dodgers starter Bob Welch seemed to have picked Coleman off, but a throwing error, reminiscent of Andújar's in Game 2, scored Coleman and put McGee on third. Herr then walked and promptly stole second to give the Cardinals runners on second and third with nobody out. After an intentional walk to Andy Van Slyke, McGee scored on Terry Pendleton's ground out to give the Cardinals a 2–0 lead.

The next inning, Vince Coleman again singled—and was again picked off base, only to advance to third on a throwing error. McGee singled Coleman home and was promptly caught stealing. Herr followed up with a home run to give the Cardinals a 4–0 lead in the second. The game was for all purposes over. The Dodgers scored single runs in the fourth on back-to-back doubles by Pedro Guerrero and Mike Marshall and in the seventh when Enos Cabell singled off of Cox, then scored on Ken Landreaux's one-out single off of Ricky Horton. Danny Cox got the win and Ken Dayley got the save with Bob Welch the losing pitcher. The victory cut the Dodger lead to two games to one.

=== Game 4 ===
Sunday, October 13, 1985, at Busch Stadium (II) in St. Louis, Missouri

Team	1	2	3	4	5	6	7	8	9	R	H	E
Los Angeles	0	0	0	0	0	0	1	1	0	2	5	1
St. Louis	0	9	0	1	1	0	0	1	X	12	15	0
WP: John Tudor (1–1) LP: Jerry Reuss (0–1); Home runs: LAD: Bill Madlock (1); STL: None

The most important event of Game 4 occurred over two hours before the first pitch was thrown. Rainy conditions in St. Louis---combined with the stadium's lack of a dome---mandated deployment of the protective tarpaulin. The tarp in Busch Stadium was automated and came out of the ground. Standing next to it was Cardinal rookie Vince Coleman, the catalyst in the Cardinals' Game 3 win. Coleman was trapped under the tarp and several players had to lift the tarp so Coleman could escape. But the damage was done: Coleman suffered a broken ankle and would miss the rest of the 1985 postseason. The question entering the fourth game was whether the Cards could win with their catalyst on the bench. And the resounding answer from Game 4 was "No problem!"

The pitching matchup for this game was the Cardinals' Tudor against Jerry Reuss for the Dodgers. In the first, both pitchers allowed no hits, and Tudor continued his mastery in the top half of the second. But the bottom of the second saw the floodgates open on Reuss. Three straight singles by Jack Clark, Tito Landrum (Coleman's replacement) and César Cedeño gave the Cardinals a 1–0 lead. Back-up catcher Tom Nieto, starting his first game in the series, walked after a Pendleton ground out scored Cedeño. With the score 2–0 and runners at first and third, Tudor tried a squeeze play that worked beyond the Cardinals' dreams. A throwing error by Reuss put the Cards up, 3–0, and sent Nieto to second with Tudor on first. McGee's hit lined out to Mike Marshall in right, moving Nieto to third. With two outs, Ozzie Smith hit an infield single to the shortstop that scored Nieto, and when Herr followed with his own single, Reuss departed in a 5–0 hole.

Rick Honeycutt came in to put out the fire, but Clark's single scored Smith. Cedeno's walk loaded the bases, and an infield single by Landrum made it 7–0 with the bases still loaded. Pendleton then singled to score both Clark and Cedeño, and Tudor had a nine-run lead. Honeycutt was pulled in favor of Bobby Castillo, who struck out Tom Nieto to end the inning.

Next inning, Cesar Cedeno hit a leadoff double and scored on Tito Landrum's single. Next inning, Willie McGee hit a leadoff double, moved to third on a groundout and scored on Tom Herr's sacrifice fly. Madlock homered off Tudor in the seventh, the only run he permitted, but by that point the Dodgers were trailing 11–1. They got another run in the eighth when Len Matuszek hit a leadoff single off of Ricky Horton, moved to second on a groundout and scored on Pedro Guerrero's single, but the Cardinals got that run back in the bottom half off of Carlos Diaz when Jack Clark singled with two outs and scored on Andy Van Slyke's single. Bill Campbell retired the Dodgers in order in the ninth en route to a 12–2 Cardinals' win that tied the series at two. Tudor went seven innings for the win while Castillo hung around until the ninth.

In past years, this would set the stage for the clinching Game 5, but the new format gave leeway to each team's pitching arrangement.

=== Game 5 ===
Monday, October 14, 1985, at Busch Stadium (II) in St. Louis, Missouri

Team	1	2	3	4	5	6	7	8	9	R	H	E
Los Angeles	0	0	0	2	0	0	0	0	0	2	5	1
St. Louis	2	0	0	0	0	0	0	0	1	3	5	1
WP: Jeff Lahti (1–0) LP: Tom Niedenfuer (0–1); Home runs: LAD: Bill Madlock (2); STL: Ozzie Smith (1)

High drama unfolded when the Dodgers and Cardinals met for Game 5 tied at two victories apiece. The Dodgers sent Valenzuela for his second start of the series against the Cardinals' number four starter, Bob Forsch. Cardinals manager Whitey Herzog felt comfortable starting Forsch to give extra rest to his pair of 20-game winners, Andujar and Tudor. Prior to the game, Dodgers manager Tommy Lasorda declared, "If they can beat Valenzuela and Hershiser, then we're not as good as we thought." Dodger/NBC announcer Vin Scully repeated this several times during the broadcasts of Games 5 and 6.

As in Games 3 and 4, the Cardinals got the ball rolling quickly. McGee and Smith led off with walks, and then Herr doubled, scoring both runners. At second with nobody out, the Dodgers—for the fifth time in the series—picked a runner off base, Herr in this case, only to see him advance on a throwing error by Valenzuela. With Herr at third and nobody out, Valenzuela masterfully got out of the jam with no further damage, and the Cardinals led, 2–0.

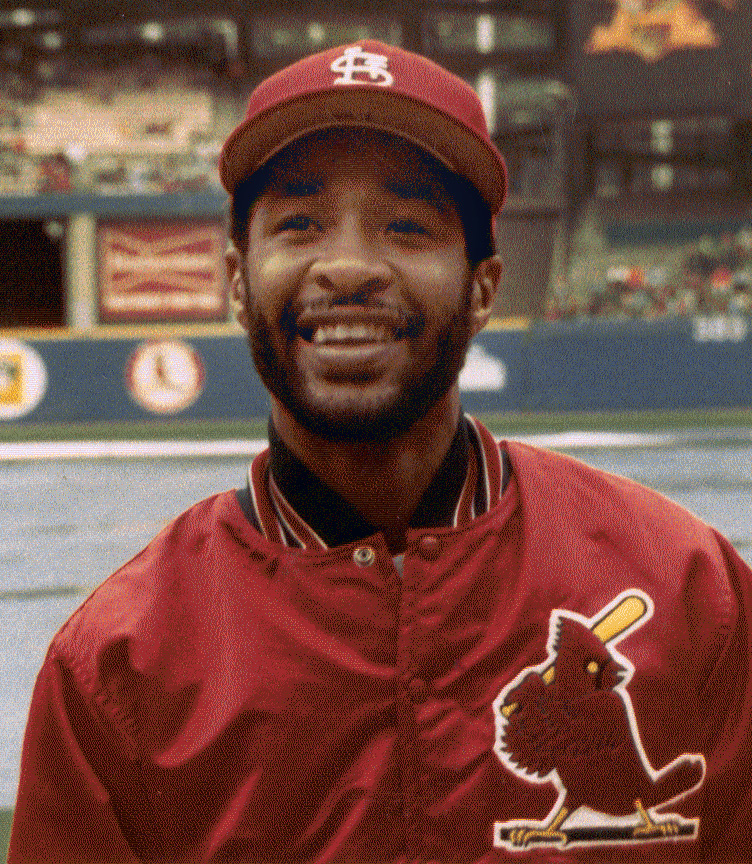
Game 5 hero, Ozzie Smith.

In the fourth inning, Landreaux singled and Madlock homered for the second time in the series to tie the game at two. Ken Dayley replaced Forsch and got out of a two on and nobody out jam. And that ended the scoring until the ninth.

Tom Niedenfuer came in to hold the Cardinals at bay in the ninth. After inducing McGee to pop up to third, Ozzie Smith (who had hit only 13 career home runs up to that point) came to bat from the left side of the plate. Never before in his career had Smith homered from the left side—until now. He golfed a Niedenfuer fastball down the right field line and over the fence for a home run, ending Game 5 as a 3–2 Cardinal victory. The ball hit the front facing of the lower deck and bounded back onto the field, but it was clearly above the home run line and Smith scored the winning run. Reliever Jeff Lahti got the win and Niedenfuer took the loss. The home run was voted the greatest moment in the history of Busch Stadium in 2005, and was the source of Jack Buck's famous call "Go crazy, folks! Go crazy!".

This was the game where a fan blew water from the top of the visitors dugout into the eyes of Steve Sax as he came back after making an out. Sax attempted to enter the stands but was halted by security. Sax later pointed out that the water was mixed with beer and hurt him. The fan was evicted by security with no further incident.

=== Game 6 ===
Wednesday, October 16, 1985, at Dodger Stadium in Los Angeles, California

Team	1	2	3	4	5	6	7	8	9	R	H	E
St. Louis	0	0	1	0	0	0	3	0	3	7	12	1
Los Angeles	1	1	0	0	2	0	0	1	0	5	8	0
WP: Todd Worrell (1–0) LP: Tom Niedenfuer (0–2) Sv: Ken Dayley (2); Home runs: STL: Jack Clark (1); LAD: Bill Madlock (3), Mike Marshall (1)

The St. Louis Cardinals won their second National League title in four years by beating the Dodgers 7–5, in what many consider to be one of the most exciting playoff games ever played. The Dodgers returned to Los Angeles trailing three games to two, but comfortable knowing the last two games would be played in Chavez Ravine. For Game 6, it was Hershiser for the Dodgers against Andujar for St. Louis.

Unlike the previous three games, it was the Dodgers and not the Cardinals who got the scoring started quickly when Mariano Duncan's double and Madlock's single put the Dodgers ahead, 1–0. An inning later, a walk to Greg Brock and singles by Hershiser and Duncan scored Brock to give the Dodgers a 2–0 lead.

Both pitchers helped themselves with hits. After Hershiser's single in the second, Andújar led off the third with a double off the wall and scored on Herr's single to cut the lead to 2–1. Andújar hurt himself in the fifth when Duncan hit a high chopper that Andújar lost in the sun allowing Duncan to reach first. Duncan promptly stole second and went to third on a ground out by Landreaux. He then scored on Pedro Guerrero's deep fly to center field. Madlock homered for the third time in the series, and the Dodgers led, 4–1.

In the top of the seventh, Darrell Porter singled, as did Tito Landrum. Steve Braun pinch-hit for Andújar and grounded out, but moved the runners to second and third. McGee's single then plated both runners, leading Tommy Lasorda to call on reliever Tom Niedenfuer. Niedenfuer's last pitch had landed in the seats to end Game 5, and the first batter he faced was the same—Ozzie Smith. Ozzie drilled a triple that just barely missed being a second left-handed homer, but Niedenfuer struck out Jack Clark on three fastballs to end the threat. But the Cardinals had now tied the game at four.

In the bottom of the eighth, Mike Marshall lifted a towering fly ball to right off of Todd Worrell. It looked like a routine out, but the wind carried the ball just out of Andy Van Slyke's reach and over the wall for a home run. The Dodgers were now just three outs from forcing Game 7.

In the ninth, Niedenfuer struck out César Cedeño, but McGee singled and stole second. With Ozzie Smith's prior success against Niedenfuer—a homer and triple in his last two at-bats—the Dodgers walked him and induced a ground out from Tommy Herr. With runners at second and third and two out, the obvious question faced Lasorda: "do you walk Clark to the open first base or do you pitch to him?" Niedenfuer had struck out Clark in the seventh. By contrast, the next two hitters in the Cardinal line-up, Van Slyke and Pendleton, were having miserable series. But Lasorda opted to pitch to Clark. Clark promptly drilled Niedenfuer's first fastball 450 feet (140 m) into the left field stands for a pennant-winning home run. Demoralized, the Dodgers went 1-2-3 in the bottom of the ninth, with Pedro Guerrero popping up for the final out.

== Composite box ==
1985 NLCS (4–2): St. Louis Cardinals over Los Angeles Dodgers

Team	1	2	3	4	5	6	7	8	9	R	H	E
St. Louis Cardinals	4	11	2	1	1	0	4	1	5	29	56	4
Los Angeles Dodgers	1	1	3	6	3	5	2	2	0	23	46	5
Total attendance: 326,822 Average attendance: 54,470

== Aftermath ==
For Jack Clark, the game-winning home run in Game 6 was of extra significance as Clark was a member of the San Francisco Giants from 1975–1984, a period where the Dodgers often dominated their rival. “There was a lot of payback for a lot of reasons,” Clark said. “For all those years in Candlestick Park. “Not only was it bad enough just having to play there, but the Dodgers kept whipping up on us every year.” Ironically, Clark later became the Dodgers' hitting coach from 2001–2003 via a recommendation from a retired Tommy Lasorda, the man who was burned by pitching to Clark instead of walking him in that fateful 9th inning of Game 6 in 1985.

The same fate that happened to the Dodgers in the NLCS would happen to the Cardinals in the World Series, blowing both a 2–0 and 3–1 lead against their in-state rivals Kansas City Royals.

What followed for Los Angeles was back-to-back losing seasons in 1986 and 1987. They were the only back-to-back losing seasons in the Lasorda-era for the Dodgers (1976–1996).

In 1988, John Tudor was traded to the Dodgers in exchange for Pedro Guerrero at the trade deadline. The Dodgers would win the World Series in 1988, as Tudor helped stabilize the Dodgers' rotation down the stretch, going 4–3 in nine starts with a 2.41 ERA, although he was mostly ineffective in the postseason. To complete the trade, Guerrero signed a three-year contract extension with the Cardinals. He enjoyed another All-Star season in 1989, hitting .311/.391/.477 with 17 home runs, 117 runs batted in and a league-leading 42 doubles and finished third in NL MVP voting. It was the third time he finished third in MVP voting in his career, with the other two being 1982 and 1985.

While both NLCS and ALCS had teams comeback from a 2–0 deficit in the first year of the expanded seven game series format in 1985, it would become increasingly more rare in the subsequent years afterwards. In the National League, it has only happened twice under the seven game format. The 2020 Dodgers would come back from a 2–0 deficit against the Braves (they also came back from a 3–1 series deficit), and the 2023 Diamondbacks erased a 2–0 deficit to defeat the Phillies in seven games.

The Dodgers and Cardinals would play each other five more times in the playoffs. St. Louis won their match-up with Los Angeles in the 2004 National League Division Series, the 2013 National League Championship Series, and the 2014 National League Division Series, while Los Angeles won the 2009 National League Division Series and the 2021 National League Wild Card Game.
