= Buddy Biancalana =

American baseball player (born 1960)

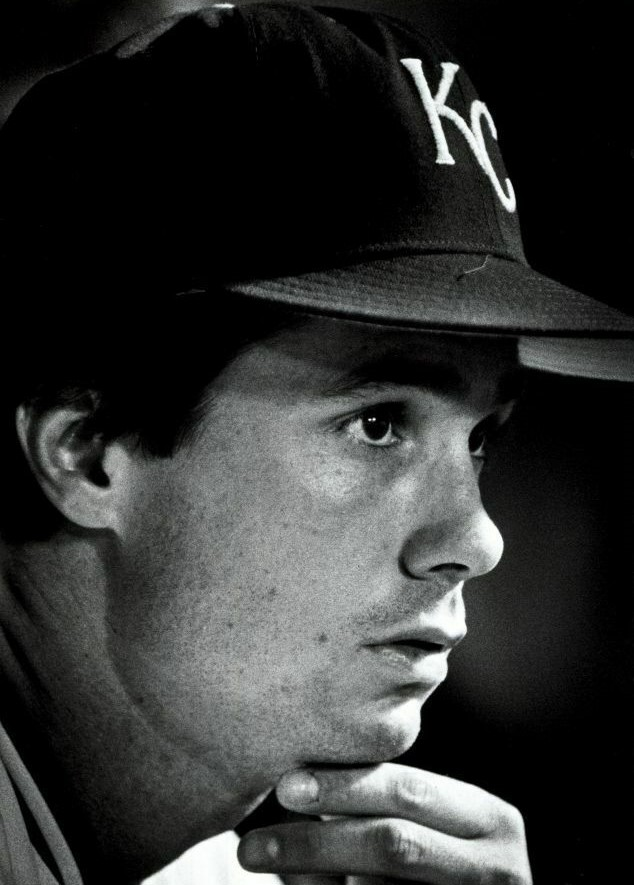
- Shortstop
- Born: February 2, 1960 (age 66); Larkspur, California, U.S.
- Batted: Switch Threw: Right

MLB debut
- September 12, 1982, for the Kansas City Royals

Last MLB appearance
- October 4, 1987, for the Houston Astros

MLB statistics
- Batting average: .205
- Home runs: 6
- Runs batted in: 30
- Stats at Baseball Reference

Teams
- Kansas City Royals (1982–1987); Houston Astros (1987)

Career highlights and awards
- World Series champion (1985)

Roland Americo "Buddy" Biancalana Jr. (/biˌɑːŋkəˈlɑːnə/; born February 2, 1960) is an American former Major League Baseball (MLB) shortstop. Biancalana played for two teams in his career: the Kansas City Royals (1982–1987) and the Houston Astros (1987).

== Biography ==
Biancalana was born on February 2, 1960, in Greenbrae, California. Biancalana attended Redwood High School in Larkspur. He played baseball all four of his years at Redwood, 1975 through 1978, garnering local and national honors along the way. In 1977, he was named to the Mythical National Champion Team, a squad composed of the best high school baseball players in the United States.

Biancalana was drafted by the Royals in the first round (25th overall pick) of the 1978 June Regular Phase draft. He had already signed a letter of intent to attend Arizona State University yet changed his mind and signed with the Royals. He met his wife, Sabrina Sojka of Millard, Nebraska, while playing in the minor leagues in Omaha, Nebraska.

He made his MLB debut on September 12, 1982, and played his final game on October 4, 1987.

Biancalana was a member of the Royals team that won the World Series in 1985. Although he had only started 35 games all season, manager Dick Howser benched regular shortstop Onix Concepcion in favor of Biancalana on September 20. Biancalana started 13 of the next 15 games as the Royals won the American League West division by one game over the California Angels. He batted .188 as a hitter during the regular season.

Biancalana was the starting shortstop for the Royals in all 14 post-season games, playing error-free defense in every game, and was an integral part in several run-scoring innings for the Royals in the World Series. He batted .278 in the series with an on-base percentage of .435, both well above his career numbers.

Biancalana had been mentioned in a joke on Late Night with David Letterman earlier in the season (mocking the mania over Pete Rose's assault on the baseball all-time hit record by unveiling a "Buddy Biancalana Hit Counter"), and after his successful postseason run, he appeared on the show, presented Letterman with a World Series bat and admitted that he had enjoyed the publicity the joke had brought him.

Biancalana is a former field manager for the Amarillo Dillas of independent United League Baseball, the infield coordinator of the Tampa Bay Devil Rays and the manager of two South Atlantic League (Class Low A) teams, the Lakewood BlueClaws (affiliate of the Philadelphia Phillies) and the Charleston Riverdogs (affiliate of the Tampa Bay Devil Rays). He is also the co-author of The 7 Secrets of the World Class Athlete.

In 2009, Biancalana was inducted as a charter member of the Redwood High School Athletic Hall of Fame.
