= 1985 Major League Baseball postseason =

1985 Major League Baseball playoffs

Tournament details
- Dates: October 8–27, 1985
- Teams: 4

Final positions
- Champions: Kansas City Royals (1st title)
- Runners-up: St. Louis Cardinals

Tournament statistics
- Games played: 20
- Attendance: 864,849 (43,242 per game)
- Most HRs: George Brett (KC) & Bill Madlock (LA) (3)
- Most SBs: Willie Wilson (KC) (4)
- Most Ks (as pitcher): John Tudor (STL) (22)

Awards
- MVP: Bret Saberhagen (KC)

The 1985 Major League Baseball postseason was the playoff tournament of Major League Baseball for the 1985 season. The winners of each division advance to the postseason and face each other in a League Championship Series to determine the pennant winners that face each other in the World Series. This was the first postseason in which the LCS was expanded to a best-of-seven series, from 1969 to 1984 it was a best-of-five series.

In the American League, the Kansas City Royals returned to the postseason for the seventh time in ten years, and the Toronto Blue Jays made their first postseason appearance in franchise history. This was Kansas City’s last postseason appearance until 2014.

In the National League, the St. Louis Cardinals returned to the postseason for the second time in four years, and the Los Angeles Dodgers were making their fifth appearance in the last nine years.

The playoffs began on October 8, 1985, and concluded on October 27, 1985, with the Royals defeating the Cardinals in seven games in the 1985 World Series. This was the first title in franchise history for the Royals.

== Playoff seeds ==
American League Teams National League Teams

The following teams qualified for the postseason:

=== American League ===
- Toronto Blue Jays – 99–62, AL East champions
- Kansas City Royals – 91–71, AL West champions

=== National League ===
- St. Louis Cardinals – 101–61, NL East champions
- Los Angeles Dodgers – 95–67, NL West champions

== Playoff bracket ==
League Championship Series (ALCS, NLCS)
East	Toronto	3
West	Kansas City	4
East	St. Louis	4
West	Los Angeles	2

World Series
AL	Kansas City	4
NL	St. Louis	3

== American League Championship Series ==
=== Toronto Blue Jays vs. Kansas City Royals ===
Kansas City won the series, 4–3.

Game	Date	Score	Location	Time	Attendance
1	October 8	Kansas City Royals – 1, Toronto Blue Jays – 6	Exhibition Stadium	2:24	39,115
2	October 9	Kansas City Royals – 5, Toronto Blue Jays – 6 (10)	Exhibition Stadium	3:39	34,029
3	October 11	Toronto Blue Jays – 5, Kansas City Royals – 6	Royals Stadium	2:51	40,224
4	October 12	Toronto Blue Jays – 3, Kansas City Royals – 1	Royals Stadium	3:02	41,112
5	October 13	Toronto Blue Jays – 0, Kansas City Royals – 2	Royals Stadium	2:21	40,046
6	October 15	Kansas City Royals – 5, Toronto Blue Jays – 3	Exhibition Stadium	3:12	37,557
7	October 16	Kansas City Royals – 6, Toronto Blue Jays – 2	Exhibition Stadium	2:49	32,084

This was the first postseason meeting between the Blue Jays and Royals. The Royals overcame a 3–1 series deficit to defeat the Blue Jays in seven games, returning to the World Series for the second time in six years.

Dave Stieb pitched eight solid innings as the Blue Jays won Game 1. Al Oliver hit a two-out RBI single in the bottom of the tenth in Game 2 to give the Blue Jays a 2–0 series lead headed to Kansas City. In Game 3, the Royals cut the Blue Jays series lead to 2–1, powered by star third baseman George Brett’s dominant performance with two home runs. The Blue Jays narrowly won Game 4 to take a 3–1 series lead thanks to their bullpen keeping the Royals’ offense at bay. Danny Jackson pitched an eight-hit complete game shutout in Game 5 as the Royals won to send the series back to Toronto. In Game 6, Brett hit his third home run of the series as the Royals forced a seventh game. In Game 7, the Royals jumped out to an early lead and did not relinquish it, winning by a 6–2 score to secure the pennant. Game 7 was the last postseason game ever played at Exhibition Stadium.

This was the first of three consecutive defeats in the ALCS for the Blue Jays. Following their 1985 loss, they fell to the eventual World Series champion Oakland Athletics in five games in 1989 and lost to another eventual champion in the Minnesota Twins in 1991, also in five games. However, Toronto would win its first pennant in 1992 over the Athletics in six games en route to a World Series title. This was the last time the Blue Jays played in a Game 7 until the ALCS in 2025, which they won.

The Royals would eventually win the pennant again in 2014 over the Baltimore Orioles in a sweep before falling in the World Series.

The Royals and Blue Jays would meet again thirty years later in the ALCS in 2015, which the Royals won in six games en route to another World Series title.

== National League Championship Series ==
=== Los Angeles Dodgers vs. St. Louis Cardinals ===
St. Louis won the series, 4–2.

Game	Date	Score	Location	Time	Attendance
1	October 9	St. Louis Cardinals – 1, Los Angeles Dodgers – 4	Dodger Stadium	2:42	55,270
2	October 10	St. Louis Cardinals – 2, Los Angeles Dodgers – 8	Dodger Stadium	3:04	55,222
3	October 12	Los Angeles Dodgers – 2, St. Louis Cardinals – 4	Busch Stadium (II)	3:21	53,708
4	October 13	Los Angeles Dodgers – 2, St. Louis Cardinals – 12	Busch Stadium (II)	2:47	53,708
5	October 14	Los Angeles Dodgers – 2, St. Louis Cardinals – 3	Busch Stadium (II)	2:56	53,706
6	October 16	St. Louis Cardinals – 7, Los Angeles Dodgers – 5	Dodger Stadium	3:32	55,208

This was the first postseason meeting in the history of the Cardinals–Dodgers rivalry. The Cardinals overcame a two-games-to-none series deficit to defeat the Dodgers in six games, returning to the World Series for the second time in four seasons.

Fernando Valenzuela out-dueled John Tudor on the mound as the Dodgers took Game 1. In Game 2, Orel Hershiser pitched an eight-hit complete game as the Dodgers blew out the Cardinals to take a 2–0 series lead headed to St. Louis. There, the Cardinals responded. Danny Cox pitched six solid innings as the Cardinals took Game 3. Tudor went seven strong innings in Game 4 as the Cardinals blew out the Dodgers to even the series at two. Game 5 went down to the wire - with the score tied at two after eight and a half innings of play Ozzie Smith hit a walk-off home run in the bottom of the ninth, giving the Cardinals a 3–2 series lead headed back to Los Angeles. In Game 6, the Dodgers led 4-3 and were three outs away from forcing a Game 7, but the Cardinals put two men on base (one coming from a walk) and then Jack Clark hit a three-run home run to put the Cardinals ahead for good. The demoralized Dodgers then had a one-two-three ninth as the Cardinals won to take the pennant.

The Dodgers returned to the NLCS in 1988, and upset the New York Mets in seven games en route to a World Series title.

The Cardinals would win their next pennant two years later over the San Francisco Giants in seven games before falling in the World Series again.

The Dodgers and Cardinals would play each other five more times in the playoffs - St. Louis won in the NLDS in 2004 and 2014, as well as the NLCS in 2013, while Los Angeles won in the NLDS in 2009 and the Wild Card Game in 2021.

== 1985 World Series ==
=== Kansas City Royals (AL) vs. St. Louis Cardinals (NL) ===
Kansas City won the series, 4–3.

Game	Date	Score	Location	Time	Attendance
1	October 19	St. Louis Cardinals – 3, Kansas City Royals – 1	Royals Stadium	2:48	41,650
2	October 20	St. Louis Cardinals – 4, Kansas City Royals – 2	Royals Stadium	2:44	41,656
3	October 22	Kansas City Royals – 6, St. Louis Cardinals – 1	Busch Stadium	2:59	53,634
4	October 23	Kansas City Royals – 0, St. Louis Cardinals – 3	Busch Stadium	2:19	53,634
5	October 24	Kansas City Royals – 6, St. Louis Cardinals – 1	Busch Stadium	2:52	53,634
6	October 26	St. Louis Cardinals – 1, Kansas City Royals – 2	Royals Stadium	2:47	41,628
7	October 27	St. Louis Cardinals – 0, Kansas City Royals – 11	Royals Stadium	2:46	41,658

This was the first World Series since 1974 to feature two teams representing the same state, and the first all-Missouri World Series since 1944, which featured the Cardinals and the St. Louis Browns (now the Baltimore Orioles). The Royals overcame a 3–1 series deficit to defeat the Cardinals in seven games, winning their first World Series title in franchise history.

John Tudor pitched six solid innings as the Cardinals took Game 1 on the road. In Game 2, the Royals lead 2-0 after eight innings, but the Cardinals put up four unanswered runs in the top of the ninth to win and take a 2–0 series lead headed to St. Louis. The Royals got on the board with a 6–1 victory in Game 3 as Bret Saberhagen went the distance, however the Cardinals would win Game 4 off a complete-game shutout performance from Tudor to take a 3–1 series lead. Danny Jackson pitched a five-hit complete game as the Royals prevailed by a 6–1 score against in Game 5 to send the series back to Kansas City.

Game 6 was the most notable contest of the series - it became famous for a controversial call in which first batter and pinch-hitter Jorge Orta, sent a chopping bouncer to the right of Jack Clark. He tossed the ball to Worrell, who tagged the bag ahead of Orta, but Clark's toss was behind Worrell and it allowed the running Orta to come between umpire Don Denkinger and his view of the lunging Worrell's glove. Denkinger called Orta safe. TV replays - not used by officials for play review until 2008 - indicated that Orta should have been called out, and an argument ensued on the field. The Cardinals argued briefly, but as crew chief and believing he had made the correct call, Denkinger would not reverse it. Orta remained at first. Despite Denkinger‘s mishap, the Cardinals forced one out and were now just two outs away from the championship. The Royals then loaded the bases after the Cardinals intentionally walked Hal McRae to set up a potential double play to end the series. However, the Royals replaced McRae with the faster John Wathan, and then 1982 Cardinals alum Dane Iorg hit a walk-off two-run RBI single to force a seventh game.

In Game 7, Saberhagen pitched a five-hit complete-game shutout as the Royals embarrassed the Cardinals, 11–0, to secure the title.

The Royals became the fifth team in World Series history to come back from a 3–1 series deficit to win the championship, and were the last to do so until the Chicago Cubs in 2016. The Royals also became the first team in MLB history to win both the LCS and the World Series after trailing three games to one in both rounds, a feat no other team has accomplished since. This was the first major league championship won by a team from Kansas City since 1970, when the Kansas City Chiefs won Super Bowl IV. After the series win, the Royals fell into a massive slump, and missed the postseason for the next 29 years. Their next postseason appearance would come in 2014, where they returned to the World Series, but narrowly lost to the San Francisco Giants in seven games, becoming the last victim of a Giants dynasty of three championships in five years from 2010 to 2014. The Royals would eventually win their next and most recent title in 2015 over the New York Mets in five games.

This was the first of three consecutive losses in the World Series for the Cardinals. They would return to the World Series two years later, but lost to the Minnesota Twins in seven games, who won their first championship in 63 years. They also returned in 2004, but were swept by the Boston Red Sox, who won their first championship in 86 years. The Cardinals would eventually taste championship success again in 2006, where they upset the Detroit Tigers in five games as part of a Cinderella run as an 83-win team.

== Broadcasting ==
NBC televised both LCS nationally in the United States. ABC then aired the World Series.
