= 1985 Major League Baseball season =

1985 MLB season
- League: American League (AL); National League (NL)
- Sport: Baseball
- Duration: Regular season: April 8 – October 6, 1985; Postseason: October 8–27, 1985
- Games: 162
- Teams: 26 (14 AL, 12 NL)
- TV partner(s): ABC, NBC

Draft
- Top draft pick: B. J. Surhoff
- Picked by: Milwaukee Brewers

Regular season
- Season MVP: NL: Willie McGee (STL); AL: Don Mattingly (NYY)

Postseason
- AL champions: Kansas City Royals
- AL runners-up: Toronto Blue Jays
- NL champions: St. Louis Cardinals
- NL runners-up: Los Angeles Dodgers

World Series
- Champions: Kansas City Royals
- Runners-up: St. Louis Cardinals
- World Series MVP: Bret Saberhagen (KC)

MLB seasons
- ← 1984 1986 →

Locations of teams for the 1982–1988 American League seasons
West East
Locations of teams for the 1977–1992 National League seasons
West East

The 1985 major league baseball season began on April 8 while the regular season ended on October 6. The postseason began on October 8. The 82nd World Series then began on October 19 and concluded on October 27 with Kansas City Royals of the American League defeating the St. Louis Cardinals of the National League, four games to three, to win their first title in franchise history.

The 56th All-Star Game was held on July 16 at the Metrodome in Minneapolis, the home of the Minnesota Twins, with the National League winning 6–1. LaMarr Hoyt was named MVP.

The League Championship Series playoffs were expanded to a best-of-seven format beginning this year, and both leagues ended up settling their pennant winners in more than five games, with the Royals beating the Toronto Blue Jays in seven games, and the Cardinals beating the Los Angeles Dodgers in six games. This was the first full season for Peter Ueberroth as commissioner.

There was a brief interruption during the regular season. The 1985 Major League Baseball strike occurred August 6 and 7, lasting only two days. The 25 cancelled games were for the most part made up later on in the season on open dates or parts of doubleheaders.

== Schedule ==
The 1985 schedule consisted of 162 games for all 14 teams in the American League and 12 teams in the National League. Both leagues saw different schedule formats, as they had since 1977. The American League was split into two seven-team divisions. Each team was scheduled to play 13 games against their six division rivals, totaling 78 games, and 12 games against seven opponents, totaling 84 interdivision games. This format, used since 1979 would be used until the league realigned into three division for the 1994 season. Meanwhile, the National League was split into two six-team divisions. Each team was scheduled to play 18 games against their five division rivals, totaling 90 games, and 12 games against six interdivision opponents, totaling 72 games. This continued the format put in place since the 1969, and like the American League, would continue to be the format in use until 1993.

Opening Day took place on April 8, featuring 10 teams. The final day of the scheduled regular season was on October 6, featuring all 26 teams. The American League Championship Series took place between October 8 and October 16, while the National League Championship Series took place between October 9 and October 16. The World Series took place between October 19 and October 27.

== Rule changes ==
The 1985 season saw the following rule changes:

- When a runner is awarded a base due to obstruction, the runner will not be charged with caught stealing.
- Regarding a pitcher entering a game to qualify for a save, "regardless of the count" was added to clarify situations where a pitcher enters a game mid-at bat.

== Teams ==
| League | Division | Team | City | Ballpark | Capacity | Manager |
|---|---|---|---|---|---|---|
| American League | East | Baltimore Orioles | Baltimore, Maryland | Baltimore Memorial Stadium | 53,198 | Joe Altobelli |
| American League | East | Baltimore Orioles | Baltimore, Maryland | Baltimore Memorial Stadium | 53,198 | Cal Ripken Sr. |
| American League | East | Baltimore Orioles | Baltimore, Maryland | Baltimore Memorial Stadium | 53,198 | Earl Weaver |
| American League | East | Boston Red Sox | Boston, Massachusetts | Fenway Park | 33,538 | John McNamara |
| American League | East | Cleveland Indians | Cleveland, Ohio | Cleveland Stadium | 74,483 | Pat Corrales |
| American League | East | Detroit Tigers | Detroit, Michigan | Tiger Stadium | 52,806 | Sparky Anderson |
| American League | East | Milwaukee Brewers | Milwaukee, Wisconsin | Milwaukee County Stadium | 53,192 | George Bamberger |
| American League | East | New York Yankees | New York, New York | Yankee Stadium | 57,545 | Yogi Berra |
| American League | East | New York Yankees | New York, New York | Yankee Stadium | 57,545 | Billy Martin |
| American League | East | Toronto Blue Jays | Toronto, Ontario | Exhibition Stadium | 43,737 | Bobby Cox |
| American League | West | California Angels | Anaheim, California | Anaheim Stadium | 64,573 | Gene Mauch |
| American League | West | Chicago White Sox | Chicago, Illinois | Comiskey Park | 44,492 | Tony La Russa |
| American League | West | Kansas City Royals | Kansas City, Missouri | Royals Stadium | 40,613 | Dick Howser |
| American League | West | Minnesota Twins | Minneapolis, Minnesota | Hubert H. Humphrey Metrodome | 54,711 | Billy Gardner |
| American League | West | Minnesota Twins | Minneapolis, Minnesota | Hubert H. Humphrey Metrodome | 54,711 | Ray Miller |
| American League | West | Oakland Athletics | Oakland, California | Oakland–Alameda County Coliseum | 50,000 | Jackie Moore |
| American League | West | Seattle Mariners | Seattle, Washington | Kingdome | 59,438 | Chuck Cottier |
| American League | West | Texas Rangers | Arlington, Texas | Arlington Stadium | 41,284 | Doug Rader |
| American League | West | Texas Rangers | Arlington, Texas | Arlington Stadium | 41,284 | Bobby Valentine |
| National League | East | Chicago Cubs | Chicago, Illinois | Wrigley Field | 37,702 | Jim Frey |
| National League | East | Montreal Expos | Montreal, Quebec | Olympic Stadium | 59,149 | Buck Rodgers |
| National League | East | New York Mets | New York, New York | Shea Stadium | 55,775 | Davey Johnson |
| National League | East | Philadelphia Phillies | Philadelphia, Pennsylvania | Veterans Stadium | 62,382 | John Felske |
| National League | East | Pittsburgh Pirates | Pittsburgh, Pennsylvania | Three Rivers Stadium | 58,336 | Chuck Tanner |
| National League | East | St. Louis Cardinals | St. Louis, Missouri | Busch Stadium | 50,222 | Whitey Herzog |
| National League | West | Atlanta Braves | Atlanta, Georgia | Atlanta–Fulton County Stadium | 53,046 | Eddie Haas |
| National League | West | Atlanta Braves | Atlanta, Georgia | Atlanta–Fulton County Stadium | 53,046 | Bobby Wine |
| National League | West | Cincinnati Reds | Cincinnati, Ohio | Riverfront Stadium | 52,953 | Pete Rose |
| National League | West | Houston Astros | Houston, Texas | Houston Astrodome | 47,000 | Bob Lillis |
| National League | West | Los Angeles Dodgers | Los Angeles, California | Dodger Stadium | 56,000 | Tommy Lasorda |
| National League | West | San Diego Padres | San Diego, California | Jack Murphy Stadium | 59,022 | Dick Williams |
| National League | West | San Francisco Giants | San Francisco, California | Candlestick Park | 58,495 | Jim Davenport |
| National League | West | San Francisco Giants | San Francisco, California | Candlestick Park | 58,495 | Roger Craig |

== Standings ==
=== American League ===
AL East
| Team | W | L | Pct. | GB | Home | Road |
|---|---|---|---|---|---|---|
| Toronto Blue Jays | 99 | 62 | .615 | — | 54‍–‍26 | 45‍–‍36 |
| New York Yankees | 97 | 64 | .602 | 2 | 58‍–‍22 | 39‍–‍42 |
| Detroit Tigers | 84 | 77 | .522 | 15 | 44‍–‍37 | 40‍–‍40 |
| Baltimore Orioles | 83 | 78 | .516 | 16 | 45‍–‍36 | 38‍–‍42 |
| Boston Red Sox | 81 | 81 | .500 | 18½ | 43‍–‍37 | 38‍–‍44 |
| Milwaukee Brewers | 71 | 90 | .441 | 28 | 40‍–‍40 | 31‍–‍50 |
| Cleveland Indians | 60 | 102 | .370 | 39½ | 38‍–‍43 | 22‍–‍59 |

AL West
| Team | W | L | Pct. | GB | Home | Road |
|---|---|---|---|---|---|---|
| Kansas City Royals | 91 | 71 | .562 | — | 50‍–‍32 | 41‍–‍39 |
| California Angels | 90 | 72 | .556 | 1 | 49‍–‍30 | 41‍–‍42 |
| Chicago White Sox | 85 | 77 | .525 | 6 | 45‍–‍36 | 40‍–‍41 |
| Minnesota Twins | 77 | 85 | .475 | 14 | 49‍–‍35 | 28‍–‍50 |
| Oakland Athletics | 77 | 85 | .475 | 14 | 43‍–‍36 | 34‍–‍49 |
| Seattle Mariners | 74 | 88 | .457 | 17 | 42‍–‍41 | 32‍–‍47 |
| Texas Rangers | 62 | 99 | .385 | 28½ | 37‍–‍43 | 25‍–‍56 |

=== National League ===
NL East
| Team | W | L | Pct. | GB | Home | Road |
|---|---|---|---|---|---|---|
| St. Louis Cardinals | 101 | 61 | .623 | — | 54‍–‍27 | 47‍–‍34 |
| New York Mets | 98 | 64 | .605 | 3 | 51‍–‍30 | 47‍–‍34 |
| Montreal Expos | 84 | 77 | .522 | 16½ | 44‍–‍37 | 40‍–‍40 |
| Chicago Cubs | 77 | 84 | .478 | 23½ | 41‍–‍39 | 36‍–‍45 |
| Philadelphia Phillies | 75 | 87 | .463 | 26 | 41‍–‍40 | 34‍–‍47 |
| Pittsburgh Pirates | 57 | 104 | .354 | 43½ | 35‍–‍45 | 22‍–‍59 |

NL West
| Team | W | L | Pct. | GB | Home | Road |
|---|---|---|---|---|---|---|
| Los Angeles Dodgers | 95 | 67 | .586 | — | 48‍–‍33 | 47‍–‍34 |
| Cincinnati Reds | 89 | 72 | .553 | 5½ | 47‍–‍34 | 42‍–‍38 |
| Houston Astros | 83 | 79 | .512 | 12 | 44‍–‍37 | 39‍–‍42 |
| San Diego Padres | 83 | 79 | .512 | 12 | 44‍–‍37 | 39‍–‍42 |
| Atlanta Braves | 66 | 96 | .407 | 29 | 32‍–‍49 | 34‍–‍47 |
| San Francisco Giants | 62 | 100 | .383 | 33 | 38‍–‍43 | 24‍–‍57 |

=== Tie games ===
2 tie games (1 in AL, 1 in NL), which are not factored into winning percentage or games behind (and were often replayed again) occurred throughout the season.

==== American League ====
The Boston Red Sox and Chicago White Sox had one tie each.

- July 31, Chicago White Sox vs. Boston Red Sox, tied at 1 following a shortened seven innings on account of a rain delay.

==== National League ====
The Chicago Cubs and Cincinnati Reds had one tie each.

- September 8, Cincinnati Reds vs. Chicago Cubs, tied at 5 following nine innings, on account of darkness.

== Postseason ==
The postseason began on October 8 and ended on October 27 with the Kansas City Royals defeating the St. Louis Cardinals in the 1985 World Series in seven games.

=== Bracket ===
League Championship Series (ALCS, NLCS)
East | Toronto | 3
West | Kansas City | 4
East | St. Louis | 4
West | Los Angeles | 2

World Series
AL | Kansas City | 4
NL | St. Louis | 3

== League leaders ==
=== American League ===
Hitting leaders
| Stat | Player | Total |
|---|---|---|
| AVG | Wade Boggs (BOS) | .368 |
| OPS | George Brett (KC) | 1.022 |
| HR | Darrell Evans (DET) | 40 |
| RBI | Don Mattingly (NYY) | 145 |
| R | Rickey Henderson (OAK) | 146 |
| H | Wade Boggs (BOS) | 240 |
| SB | Rickey Henderson (OAK) | 80 |

Pitching leaders
| Stat | Player | Total |
|---|---|---|
| W | Ron Guidry (NYY) | 22 |
| L | Matt Young (SEA) | 19 |
| ERA | Dave Stieb (TOR) | 2.48 |
| K | Bert Blyleven (MIN/CLE) | 206 |
| IP | Bert Blyleven (MIN/CLE) | 293.2 |
| SV | Dan Quisenberry (KC) | 37 |
| WHIP | Bret Saberhagen (KC) | 1.058 |

=== National League ===
Hitting leaders
| Stat | Player | Total |
|---|---|---|
| AVG | Willie McGee (STL) | .353 |
| OPS | Pedro Guerrero (LAD) | .999 |
| HR | Dale Murphy (ATL) | 37 |
| RBI | Dave Parker (CIN) | 125 |
| R | Dale Murphy (ATL) | 118 |
| H | Willie McGee (STL) | 216 |
| SB | Vince Coleman (STL) | 110 |

Pitching leaders
| Stat | Player | Total |
|---|---|---|
| W | Dwight Gooden^{1} (NYM) | 24 |
| L | José DeLeón (PIT) | 19 |
| ERA | Dwight Gooden^{1} (NYM) | 1.53 |
| K | Dwight Gooden^{1} (NYM) | 268 |
| IP | Dwight Gooden (NYM) | 276.2 |
| SV | Jeff Reardon (MON) | 41 |
| WHIP | John Tudor (STL) | 0.938 |

^{1} National League Triple Crown pitching winner

== Managerial changes ==
=== Off-season ===
| Team | Former Manager | New Manager |
|---|---|---|
| Atlanta Braves | Joe Torre | Eddie Haas |
| Boston Red Sox | Ralph Houk | John McNamara |
| California Angels | John McNamara | Gene Mauch |
| Milwaukee Brewers | Rene Lachemann | George Bamberger |
| Montreal Expos | Jim Fanning | Buck Rodgers |
| Philadelphia Phillies | Paul Owens | John Felske |
| San Francisco Giants | Danny Ozark | Jim Davenport |

=== In-season ===
| Team | Former Manager | New Manager |
|---|---|---|
| Atlanta Braves | Eddie Haas | Bobby Wine |
| Baltimore Orioles | Joe Altobelli | Cal Ripken Sr. |
| Baltimore Orioles | Cal Ripken Sr. | Earl Weaver |
| Minnesota Twins | Billy Gardner | Ray Miller |
| New York Yankees | Yogi Berra | Billy Martin |
| San Francisco Giants | Jim Davenport | Roger Craig |
| Texas Rangers | Doug Rader | Bobby Valentine |

== Milestones ==
=== Batters ===
==== Cycles ====
- Jeffrey Leonard (SF):
  - Leonard hit for his first cycle and 16th in franchise history, on June 27 against the Cincinnati Reds.
- Keith Hernandez (NYM):
  - Hernandez hit for his first cycle and fourth in franchise history, on July 4 against the Atlanta Braves.
- Oddibe McDowell (TEX):
  - McDowell hit for his first cycle and second in franchise history, on July 23 against the Cleveland Indians.
- Rich Gedman (BOS):
  - Gedman hit for his first cycle and 18th in franchise history, on September 18 against the Toronto Blue Jays.

==== Other batting accomplishments ====
- Rickey Henderson (NYY):
  - Recorded his 500th career stolen base in the first inning against the Kansas City Royals on May 10. He became the 26th player to reach this mark.
- Davey Lopes (CHC):
  - Recorded his 500th career stolen base in the sixth inning against the Atlanta Braves on June 4. He became the 27th player to reach this mark.
- Rod Carew (CAL):
  - Recorded his 3,000th career hit with a single in the third inning against the Minnesota Twins on August 4. He became the 16th player to reach this mark.
- Dave Kingman (OAK):
  - Became the 21st player in Major League history to hit 400 home runs in the first inning against the Seattle Mariners on August 10.
- Pete Rose (CIN):
  - Broke a Major League record of 4,192 hits on September 11, breaking Ty Cobb's all-time major league career hits record.

=== Pitchers ===
- Nolan Ryan (HOU):
  - Recorded his 4,000th career strikeout on July 11 by striking out Danny Heep of the New York Mets in the sixth inning. Ryan became the first player to reach this mark.
- Tom Seaver (CWS):
  - Became the 17th member of the 300-win club, defeating the New York Yankees on August 4, winning 4–1.
- Phil Niekro (NYY):
  - Became the 18th member of the 300-win club, defeating the Toronto Blue Jays on October 6, winning 8–0. He also became the oldest pitcher (age 46) to record a shutout as a member of the New York Yankees.

=== Miscellaneous ===
- New York Mets:
  - Set a major league record for most runs scored in the 19th inning, by scoring five runs against the Atlanta Braves on July 4.

== Awards and honors ==
Baseball Writers' Association of America Awards
| BBWAA Award | National League | American League |
|---|---|---|
| Rookie of the Year | Vince Coleman (STL) | Ozzie Guillen (CWS) |
| Manager of the Year | Whitey Herzog (STL) | Bobby Cox (TOR) |
| Cy Young Award | Dwight Gooden (NYM) | Bret Saberhagen (KC) |
| Most Valuable Player | Willie McGee (STL) | Don Mattingly (NYY) |
Gold Glove Awards
| Position | National League | American League |
| Pitcher | Rick Reuschel (PIT) | Ron Guidry (NYY) |
| Catcher | Tony Peña (PIT) | Lance Parrish (DET) |
| First Baseman | Keith Hernandez (NYM) | Don Mattingly (NYY) |
| Second Baseman | Ryne Sandberg (CHC) | Lou Whitaker (DET) |
| Third Baseman | Tim Wallach (MON) | George Brett (KC) |
| Shortstop | Ozzie Smith (STL) | Alfredo Griffin (OAK) |
| Outfielders | Andre Dawson (MON) | Dwight Evans (BOS) |
| Outfielders | Willie McGee (STL) | Dwayne Murphy (OAK) |
| Outfielders | Dale Murphy (ATL) | Gary Pettis (CAL); Dave Winfield (NYY) |
Silver Slugger Awards
| Pitcher/Designated Hitter | Rick Rhoden (PIT) | Don Baylor (NYY) |
| Catcher | Gary Carter (NYM) | Carlton Fisk (CWS) |
| First Baseman | Jack Clark (STL) | Don Mattingly (NYY) |
| Second Baseman | Ryne Sandberg (CHC) | Lou Whitaker (DET) |
| Third Baseman | Tim Wallach (MON) | George Brett (KC) |
| Shortstop | Hubie Brooks (MON) | Cal Ripken Jr. (BAL) |
| Outfielders | Willie McGee (STL) | George Bell (TOR) |
| Outfielders | Dale Murphy (ATL) | Rickey Henderson (NYY) |
| Outfielders | Dave Parker (CIN) | Dave Winfield (NYY) |

=== Other awards ===
- Outstanding Designated Hitter Award: Don Baylor (NYY)
- Roberto Clemente Award (Humanitarian): Don Baylor (NYY)
- Hutch Award: Rick Reuschel (PIT)
- League Championship Series Most Valuable Player Award: Ozzie Smith (STL, National); George Brett (KC, American)
- Rolaids Relief Man Award: Jeff Reardon (MON, National); Dan Quisenberry (KC, American);

The Sporting News Awards
| Award | National League | American League |
|---|---|---|
| Player of the Year | — | Don Mattingly (NYY) |
| Pitcher of the Year | Dwight Gooden (NYM) | Bret Saberhagen (KC) |
| Fireman of the Year (Relief pitcher) | Jeff Reardon (MON) | Dan Quisenberry (KC) |
| Rookie Player of the Year | Vince Coleman (STL) | Ozzie Guillén (CWS) |
| Rookie Pitcher of the Year | Tom Browning (CIN) | Teddy Higuera (MIN) |
| Comeback Player of the Year | Rick Reuschel (PIT) | Gorman Thomas (SEA) |
| Manager of the Year | — | Bobby Cox (TOR) |
| Executive of the Year | — | John Schuerholz (KC) |

=== Monthly awards ===
==== Player of the Month ====
| Month | National League | American League |
|---|---|---|
| April | Dale Murphy (ATL) | Mike Davis (OAK) |
| May | Dave Parker (CIN) | George Brett (KC) |
| June | Pedro Guerrero (LAD) | Rickey Henderson (NYY) |
| July | Keith Hernandez (NYM) | George Brett (KC) |
| August | Willie McGee (STL) | Don Mattingly (NYY) |
| September | Gary Carter (NYM) | Don Mattingly (NYY) |

==== Pitcher of the Month ====
| Month | American League | National League |
|---|---|---|
| April | Fernando Valenzuela (LAD) | Charlie Leibrandt (KC) |
| May | Andy Hawkins (SD) | Dave Stieb (TOR) |
| June | John Tudor (STL) | Jay Howell (OAK) |
| July | Fernando Valenzuela (LAD) | Bret Saberhagen (KC) |
| August | Shane Rawley (PHI) | Dave Righetti (NYY) |
| September | Dwight Gooden (NYM) | Charlie Leibrandt (KC) |

=== Baseball Hall of Fame ===
- Lou Brock
- Enos Slaughter
- Arky Vaughan
- Hoyt Wilhelm

== Home field attendance and payroll ==
| Team name | Wins | %± | Home attendance | %± | Per game | Est. payroll |
|---|---|---|---|---|---|---|
| Los Angeles Dodgers | 95 | 20.3% | 3,264,593 | 4.1% | 40,304 | $10,967,917 |
| New York Mets | 98 | 8.9% | 2,761,601 | 49.9% | 34,094 | $10,834,762 |
| St. Louis Cardinals | 101 | 20.2% | 2,637,563 | 29.5% | 32,563 | $11,817,083 |
| California Angels | 90 | 11.1% | 2,567,427 | 6.8% | 32,499 | $14,427,894 |
| Toronto Blue Jays | 99 | 11.2% | 2,468,925 | 17.0% | 30,862 | $9,329,217 |
| Detroit Tigers | 84 | −19.2% | 2,286,609 | −15.5% | 28,230 | $10,348,143 |
| New York Yankees | 97 | 11.5% | 2,214,587 | 21.6% | 27,682 | $14,238,204 |
| San Diego Padres | 83 | −9.8% | 2,210,352 | 11.4% | 27,288 | $11,191,583 |
| Kansas City Royals | 91 | 8.3% | 2,162,717 | 19.5% | 26,375 | $10,565,346 |
| Chicago Cubs | 77 | −19.8% | 2,161,534 | 2.6% | 26,686 | $12,702,917 |
| Baltimore Orioles | 83 | −2.4% | 2,132,387 | 4.2% | 26,326 | $12,085,712 |
| Cincinnati Reds | 89 | 27.1% | 1,834,619 | 43.8% | 22,650 | $8,359,917 |
| Philadelphia Phillies | 75 | −7.4% | 1,830,350 | −11.3% | 22,597 | $10,644,966 |
| Boston Red Sox | 81 | −5.8% | 1,786,633 | 7.5% | 22,057 | $10,897,560 |
| Chicago White Sox | 85 | 14.9% | 1,669,888 | −21.9% | 20,616 | $9,846,178 |
| Minnesota Twins | 77 | −4.9% | 1,651,814 | 3.3% | 19,664 | $5,764,821 |
| Montreal Expos | 84 | 7.7% | 1,502,494 | −6.5% | 18,549 | $9,470,166 |
| Milwaukee Brewers | 71 | 6.0% | 1,360,265 | −15.4% | 17,003 | $11,284,107 |
| Atlanta Braves | 66 | −17.5% | 1,350,137 | −21.7% | 16,668 | $14,807,000 |
| Oakland Athletics | 77 | 0.0% | 1,334,599 | −1.4% | 16,894 | $9,058,606 |
| Houston Astros | 83 | 3.8% | 1,184,314 | −3.7% | 14,621 | $9,993,051 |
| Seattle Mariners | 74 | 0.0% | 1,128,696 | 29.7% | 13,599 | $4,613,000 |
| Texas Rangers | 62 | −10.1% | 1,112,497 | 0.9% | 13,906 | $7,676,500 |
| San Francisco Giants | 62 | −6.1% | 818,697 | −18.3% | 10,107 | $8,221,714 |
| Pittsburgh Pirates | 57 | −24.0% | 735,900 | −4.9% | 9,199 | $9,267,500 |
| Cleveland Indians | 60 | −20.0% | 655,181 | −10.7% | 8,089 | $6,551,666 |

== Umpires ==
American League Umpires
| Name | G | HP | 1B | 2B | 3B | LF | RF |
|---|---|---|---|---|---|---|---|
| (#22) Larry Barnett | 147 | 39 | 37 | 33 | 39 | 0 | 0 |
| (#2) Nick Bremigan | 125 | 32 | 33 | 31 | 29 | 0 | 0 |
| (#15) Joe Brinkman | 145 | 37 | 25 | 34 | 39 | 0 | 0 |
| (#24) Al Clark | 139 | 35 | 36 | 34 | 34 | 0 | 0 |
| (#37) Drew Coble | 139 | 36 | 34 | 35 | 35 | 0 | 0 |
| (#12) Terry Cooney | 135 | 35 | 35 | 31 | 34 | 0 | 0 |
| (#13) Derryl Cousins | 147 | 37 | 37 | 36 | 37 | 0 | 0 |
| (#11) Don Denkinger | 144 | 37 | 34 | 34 | 39 | 0 | 0 |
| (#3) Jim Evans | 150 | 39 | 37 | 36 | 38 | 0 | 0 |
| (#20) Dale Ford | 152 | 39 | 40 | 35 | 38 | 0 | 0 |
| (#19) Rich Garcia | 144 | 36 | 36 | 36 | 36 | 0 | 0 |
| (#35) Ted Hendry | 149 | 37 | 38 | 37 | 37 | 0 | 0 |
| (#17) John Hirschbeck | 100 | 24 | 26 | 26 | 24 | 0 | 0 |
| Rich Humphrey | 16 | 5 | 5 | 3 | 3 | 0 | 0 |
| (#25) Mark Johnson | 92 | 23 | 22 | 24 | 23 | 0 | 0 |
| (#21) Ken Kaiser | 144 | 36 | 36 | 36 | 36 | 0 | 0 |
| (#18) Greg Kosc | 145 | 36 | 36 | 36 | 37 | 0 | 0 |
| Tom Leppard | 29 | 6 | 7 | 8 | 8 | 0 | 0 |
| (#36) Tim McClelland | 144 | 36 | 35 | 37 | 36 | 0 | 0 |
| (#10) Larry McCoy | 150 | 38 | 37 | 38 | 37 | 0 | 0 |
| (#8) Jim McKean | 137 | 34 | 36 | 35 | 32 | 0 | 0 |
| (#33) Durwood Merrill | 148 | 37 | 38 | 32 | 41 | 0 | 0 |
| (#34) Dan Morrison | 149 | 37 | 38 | 36 | 38 | 0 | 0 |
| (#6) Jerry Neudecker | 152 | 39 | 39 | 36 | 38 | 0 | 0 |
| (#14) Steve Palermo | 150 | 37 | 38 | 37 | 38 | 0 | 0 |
| (#7) Dave Phillips | 150 | 38 | 37 | 37 | 38 | 0 | 0 |
| (#23) Rick Reed | 147 | 36 | 37 | 37 | 37 | 0 | 0 |
| (#31) Mike Reilly | 145 | 36 | 37 | 37 | 35 | 0 | 0 |
| (#27) Rocky Roe | 148 | 37 | 37 | 35 | 39 | 0 | 0 |
| Dale Scott | 1 | 0 | 0 | 0 | 1 | 0 | 0 |
| (#29) John Shulock | 115 | 28 | 31 | 28 | 28 | 0 | 0 |
| (#4) Marty Springstead | 150 | 38 | 38 | 35 | 39 | 0 | 0 |
| Tim Tschida | 27 | 6 | 6 | 9 | 6 | 0 | 0 |
| (#26) Vic Voltaggio | 126 | 33 | 31 | 32 | 30 | 0 | 0 |
| (#30) Tim Welke | 127 | 33 | 32 | 30 | 32 | 0 | 0 |
| (#28) Larry Young | 86 | 22 | 21 | 22 | 21 | 0 | 0 |

National League Umpires
| Name | G | HP | 1B | 2B | 3B | LF | RF |
|---|---|---|---|---|---|---|---|
| Greg Bonin | 24 | 7 | 5 | 6 | 6 | 0 | 0 |
| (#28) Fred Brocklander | 150 | 38 | 38 | 38 | 36 | 0 | 0 |
| (#2) Jerry Crawford | 139 | 34 | 34 | 35 | 36 | 0 | 0 |
| (#3) Jerry Dale | 17 | 5 | 4 | 4 | 4 | 0 | 0 |
| (#31) Bob Davidson | 148 | 37 | 37 | 38 | 36 | 0 | 0 |
| (#12) Gerry Davis | 127 | 32 | 31 | 32 | 32 | 0 | 0 |
| (#32) Dana DeMuth | 84 | 21 | 19 | 22 | 22 | 0 | 0 |
| (#5) Bob Engel | 150 | 39 | 37 | 37 | 37 | 0 | 0 |
| (#6) Bruce Froemming | 147 | 37 | 39 | 35 | 36 | 0 | 0 |
| (#7) Eric Gregg | 132 | 33 | 34 | 33 | 32 | 0 | 0 |
| (#33) Scott Grinder | 36 | 9 | 8 | 8 | 11 | 0 | 0 |
| (#20) Tom Hallion | 31 | 8 | 8 | 9 | 6 | 0 | 0 |
| (#29) Lanny Harris | 98 | 23 | 26 | 26 | 23 | 0 | 0 |
| (#8) Doug Harvey | 145 | 37 | 38 | 34 | 36 | 0 | 0 |
| (#9) John Kibler | 135 | 34 | 33 | 33 | 35 | 0 | 0 |
| (#30) Randy Marsh | 149 | 36 | 37 | 38 | 38 | 0 | 0 |
| (#10) John McSherry | 152 | 38 | 38 | 38 | 38 | 0 | 0 |
| (#11) Ed Montague | 151 | 37 | 38 | 39 | 37 | 0 | 0 |
| (#26) Dave Pallone | 143 | 34 | 37 | 35 | 37 | 0 | 0 |
| Larry Poncino | 7 | 2 | 2 | 2 | 1 | 0 | 0 |
| (#14) Frank Pulli | 146 | 37 | 36 | 36 | 37 | 0 | 0 |
| (#15) Jim Quick | 145 | 36 | 37 | 35 | 37 | 0 | 0 |
| (#16) Dutch Rennert | 151 | 38 | 39 | 36 | 38 | 0 | 0 |
| (#27) Steve Rippley | 84 | 21 | 21 | 21 | 21 | 0 | 0 |
| (#17) Paul Runge | 147 | 37 | 36 | 37 | 37 | 0 | 0 |
| (#18) Dick Stello | 149 | 37 | 37 | 37 | 38 | 0 | 0 |
| (#19) Terry Tata | 145 | 36 | 37 | 36 | 36 | 0 | 0 |
| (#21) Harry Wendelstedt | 143 | 37 | 36 | 33 | 37 | 0 | 0 |
| (#22) Joe West | 150 | 37 | 37 | 37 | 39 | 0 | 0 |
| (#23) Lee Weyer | 152 | 39 | 36 | 38 | 39 | 0 | 0 |
| (#24) Bill Williams | 154 | 38 | 38 | 38 | 40 | 0 | 0 |
| (#25) Charlie Williams | 151 | 38 | 39 | 40 | 34 | 0 | 0 |

== Media ==
=== Television ===
| Network | Day of week | Announcers |
|---|---|---|
| ABC | Monday nights Sunday afternoons | Al Michaels, Jim Palmer, Howard Cosell, (Note: ABC replaced Howard Cosell with Tim McCarver in the booth alongside Al Michaels and Jim Palmer for the 1985 World Series due to the controversy surrounding Cosell's book, I Never Played the Game.) Tim McCarver, Don Drysdale |
| NBC | Saturday afternoons | Vin Scully, Joe Garagiola, Bob Costas, Tony Kubek |

== Retired numbers ==
- Phil Rizzuto had his No. 10 retired by the New York Yankees on August 4. This was the 12th number retired by the team.
- Jim Palmer had his No. 22 retired by the Baltimore Orioles on September 1. This was the fourth number retired by the team.

== See also ==
- 1985 in baseball (Events, Movies, Births, Deaths)
- 1985 Nippon Professional Baseball season
