= 1985 World Series =

1985 Major League Baseball championship series

Team (Wins)	Managers	Season
Kansas City Royals (4)	Dick Howser	91–71, .562, GA: 1
St. Louis Cardinals (3)	Whitey Herzog	101–61, .623, GA: 3
- Dates: October 19–27
- Venue(s): Royals Stadium (Kansas City); Busch Stadium (St. Louis)
- MVP: Bret Saberhagen (Kansas City)
- Umpires: Don Denkinger (AL), Billy Williams (NL), Jim McKean (AL), Bob Engel (NL), John Shulock (AL), Jim Quick (NL)
- Hall of Famers: Royals: John Schuerholz (GM); George Brett; Cardinals: Whitey Herzog (manager); Ozzie Smith

Broadcast
- Television: ABC
- TV announcers: Al Michaels, Jim Palmer and Tim McCarver
- Radio: CBS; WIBW (KC); KMOX (STL)
- Radio announcers: Jack Buck and Sparky Anderson (CBS, KMOX); Denny Matthews and Fred White (WIBW)
- ALCS: Kansas City Royals over Toronto Blue Jays (4–3)
- NLCS: St. Louis Cardinals over Los Angeles Dodgers (4–2)

The 1985 World Series was the championship series of Major League Baseball's (MLB) 1985 season. The 82nd edition of the World Series, it was a best-of-seven playoff played between the American League (AL) champion Kansas City Royals and the National League (NL) champion St. Louis Cardinals. The Royals upset the heavily favored Cardinals in seven games. The Series was popularly known as the "Show-Me Series" or the "I-70 Showdown Series," as both cities are in the state of Missouri which is nicknamed the "Show Me State" and are connected by Interstate 70.

The Cardinals won the NL East division by three games over the New York Mets, then defeated the Los Angeles Dodgers four games to two in the NL Championship Series. The Royals won the AL West division by one game over the California Angels, then defeated the Toronto Blue Jays four games to three in the AL Championship Series.

The Cardinals were seeking to win their NL-leading 10th World Series title, while the Royals were seeking their first World Series title. The Royals were completing one of the most successful decades by any expansion team, with six division titles and two pennants from 1976 to 1985. This was the first World Series in which all games were played at night. Also, this was the second all-Missouri World Series; the first in 1944 was the all-St. Louis series between the Browns (who a decade later became the Baltimore Orioles) and the Cardinals. This was the second of five World Series played completely on artificial turf; the first was in 1980 and the others were in 1987, 1993 and 2020.

This is the most recent World Series in which the designated hitter was not used in an AL baseball park. From 1976 to 1985, the DH was used in all games in even-numbered years. In odd-numbered years, like this World Series, the pitchers from both were required to bat for themselves throughout the series, as in the National League. Beginning with the next World Series, the DH rule was used only at the AL representative's park.

The 1985 World Series is best remembered for an incorrect safe call made by first base umpire Don Denkinger in Game 6. With St. Louis leading the World Series 3-2 and in possession of a 1-0 lead in the bottom of the ninth inning, Denkinger incorrectly called Jorge Orta safe. The Royals won the game 2-1 on a two-run walk-off single and then won Game 7 by a score of 11-0.

The 1985 World Series marked the fifth time in World Series history that a team came back from a three games to one deficit to win a championship, and the first in which that team lost the first two games of the series at home (in the following year's Series, the New York Mets won after losing the first two series games at home). This also later happened in the 1996 World Series, where the New York Yankees defeated the Atlanta Braves after losing the first two games at home. It is the last time this happened in a World Series, but the Toronto Blue Jays accomplished the feat against the Seattle Mariners in the 2025 American League Championship Series. Bret Saberhagen's victories in Games 3 and 7, allowing only a single run across his two starts, earned him the World Series Most Valuable Player Award.

In their 17th season, the Royals won their first World Series title; their next appearance was 29 years later in 2014 against the San Francisco Giants, but they lost in seven games. A year later, the Royals won their second title, over the New York Mets. This was the first World Series to have all games played at night during primetime, however this would become a regular practice until 1990 when the games would start at 8pm eastern.

== Summary ==
AL Kansas City Royals (4) vs. NL St. Louis Cardinals (3)

Game	Date	Score	Location	Time	Attendance
1	October 19	St. Louis Cardinals – 3, Kansas City Royals – 1	Royals Stadium	2:48	41,650
2	October 20	St. Louis Cardinals – 4, Kansas City Royals – 2	Royals Stadium	2:44	41,656
3	October 22	Kansas City Royals – 6, St. Louis Cardinals – 1	Busch Stadium	2:59	53,634
4	October 23	Kansas City Royals – 0, St. Louis Cardinals – 3	Busch Stadium	2:19	53,634
5	October 24	Kansas City Royals – 6, St. Louis Cardinals – 1	Busch Stadium	2:52	53,634
6	October 26	St. Louis Cardinals – 1, Kansas City Royals – 2	Royals Stadium	2:47	41,628
7	October 27	St. Louis Cardinals – 0, Kansas City Royals – 11	Royals Stadium	2:46	41,658

== Matchups ==
=== Game 1 ===
Saturday, October 19, 1985 7:35 pm (CT) at Royals Stadium in Kansas City, Missouri 57 °F (14 °C), overcast
Team	1	2	3	4	5	6	7	8	9	R	H	E
St. Louis	0	0	1	1	0	0	0	0	1	3	7	1
Kansas City	0	1	0	0	0	0	0	0	0	1	8	0
WP: John Tudor (1–0) LP: Danny Jackson (0–1) Sv: Todd Worrell (1)

When Lonnie Smith led off for the Royals, he became the first player in MLB history to be traded from a team (the Cardinals) during a season and play against that team in the World Series the same season.

John Tudor scattered seven hits in 6 2/3 innings for the Cards and won with relief help from Todd Worrell. The Royals struck first in the second on Steve Balboni's RBI single with runners on first and second, but the Cardinals tied it off of Danny Jackson in the third on Willie McGee's RBI groundout with runners on second and third. Next inning, Tito Landrum doubled with one out, then scored on late-season acquisition César Cedeño's RBI double to give Jackson the loss despite Jackson throwing seven innings of two-run ball. The Cardinals padded their lead in the ninth off of Dan Quisenberry when Tom Herr singled to lead off and scored on Jack Clark's double.

This was the first Saturday night game in World Series history. The Series began on a Saturday from 1969 through 1976, and again from 1985 through 2006 (with the exception of 1990, which began on a Tuesday night).

=== Game 2 ===
With the bases loaded and trailing in the 9th, Terry Pendleton delivered a three-run double to give St. Louis the victory.

Sunday, October 20, 1985 7:30 pm (CT) at Royals Stadium in Kansas City, Missouri 58 °F (14 °C), overcast
Team	1	2	3	4	5	6	7	8	9	R	H	E
St. Louis	0	0	0	0	0	0	0	0	4	4	6	0
Kansas City	0	0	0	2	0	0	0	0	0	2	9	0
WP: Ken Dayley (1–0) LP: Charlie Leibrandt (0–1) Sv: Jeff Lahti (1)

The Royals went up 2–0 in the fourth off of Danny Cox when Willie Wilson hit a leadoff single that was followed by back-to-back RBI doubles by George Brett and Frank White. However Charlie Leibrandt continued a history of tough luck in the postseason. The previous year, he had lost Game 3 of the 1984 ALCS, 1–0, to the Detroit Tigers when he pitched a three-hit complete game. He lost Game 4 in the 1985 ALCS in the ninth inning. Clinging to a two-run lead in the ninth of this game, manager Dick Howser opted to not send in his relief ace Dan Quisenberry to close out the game. Leibrandt allowed a leadoff double to Willie McGee, then was only one out from tying the series at one apiece when he allowed an RBI single to Jack Clark. After a double and walk loaded the bases, Terry Pendleton cleared them with a double and gave the Cardinals a 4–2 lead. Quisenberry came in and after he walked Darrell Porter he got out of the inning. Jeff Lahti earned a save with a scoreless bottom of the inning. The Cardinals' four run ninth would be the only inning in the series in which they scored more than one run.

=== Game 3 ===
Tuesday, October 22, 1985 7:35 pm (CT) at Busch Stadium in St. Louis, Missouri 64 °F (18 °C), partly cloudy
Team	1	2	3	4	5	6	7	8	9	R	H	E
Kansas City	0	0	0	2	2	0	2	0	0	6	11	0
St. Louis	0	0	0	0	0	1	0	0	0	1	6	0
WP: Bret Saberhagen (1–0) LP: Joaquín Andújar (0–1); Home runs: KC: Frank White (1); STL: None

The Royals got back into the series by riding ace Bret Saberhagen to a 6–1 victory against twenty-game winner Joaquín Andújar. Saberhagen flashed messages on the television screen to his pregnant wife who was due to give birth any day. She eventually gave birth on October 26 (in Game 6). The Royals went up 2–0 in the fourth on Lonnie Smith's two-run double that scored Jim Sundberg and Buddy Biancalana, who had walked and singled, respectively. Royals second baseman Frank White made history by becoming the first second baseman in the history of the World Series to hit in the clean-up spot in the batting order. White came through with a two-run home run off of Andújar in the fifth after George Brett got on base. The Cardinals scored their only run of the game in the sixth off of Saberhagen on consecutive singles by Ozzie Smith, Tom Herr, and Jack Clark. The Royals padded their lead in the seventh off of Ricky Horton when George Brett drew a leadoff walk, moved to second on a balk, then scored on White's double. Two outs later, White scored on Biancalana's single to cap the scoring.

=== Game 4 ===
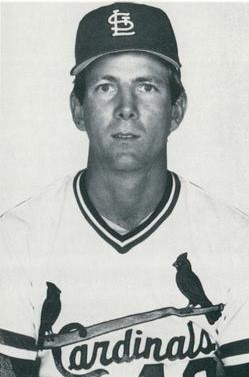
John Tudor hurled a complete game shutout to get the Cardinals one win away from the World Series title.

Wednesday, October 23, 1985 7:25 pm (CT) at Busch Stadium in St. Louis, Missouri 70 °F (21 °C), haze
Team	1	2	3	4	5	6	7	8	9	R	H	E
Kansas City	0	0	0	0	0	0	0	0	0	0	5	1
St. Louis	0	1	1	0	1	0	0	0	X	3	6	0
WP: John Tudor (2–0) LP: Bud Black (0–1); Home runs: KC: None; STL: Tito Landrum (1), Willie McGee (1)

John Tudor's complete game shutout put the Cardinals on the verge of winning their second World Series in four years. Tito Landrum, only playing due to a tarp injury to Vince Coleman, continued to make his case for series MVP with a home run in the second off of Bud Black. Next inning, Willie McGee homered also to make it 2–0 Cardinals, who added to their lead in the fifth when Terry Pendleton tripled with one out and scored on Black's throwing error on Tom Nieto's bunt attempt. The best chance for the Royals to score was in the seventh inning, when they loaded the bases on two singles and a walk. With pinch-hitter Hal McRae up for Buddy Biancalana, he grounded to the third baseman to end the threat. Tudor allowed just five hits in a complete game while striking out eight with one walk while Black went just five innings and allowing three runs on four hits and three walks.

=== Game 5 ===
Danny Jackson hurled a complete game for Kansas City that saw them stay alive and force a sixth game.

Thursday, October 24, 1985 7:25 pm (CT) at Busch Stadium in St. Louis, Missouri 70 °F (21 °C), clear
Team	1	2	3	4	5	6	7	8	9	R	H	E
Kansas City	1	3	0	0	0	0	0	1	1	6	11	2
St. Louis	1	0	0	0	0	0	0	0	0	1	5	1
WP: Danny Jackson (1–1) LP: Bob Forsch (0–1)

Entering this game, the Royals were 3–0 in must-win games in playoff elimination games. They improved their record to 4–0 with a decisive victory over the Cardinals, again by the score of 6–1. The Royals struck first on Frank White's groundout with runners on second and third in the top of the first off of Bob Forsch, but the Cardinals tied it off of Danny Jackson in the bottom half on back-to-back two-out doubles by Tom Herr and Jack Clark. However, they would not score after that. The Royals broke the game open in the second when Buddy Biancalana singled to score Jim Sundberg, who doubled with one out. After Lonnie Smith walked, Willie Wilson tripled home both runs to make it 4–1. The Royals added to their lead in the eighth off of Jeff Lahti on shortstop Ozzie Smith's throwing error on Danny Jackson's ground ball, then in the ninth on Pat Sheridan's RBI double. Jackson was the winning pitcher, following the same formula and pitching rotation as the Royals did in the ALCS where Jackson also won Game 5. Jackson threw an immaculate inning in the 7th, becoming the only pitcher to do so during a postseason game to date. Jackson scattered five hits, allowing only one run in a complete game.

=== Game 6 ===
Saturday, October 26, 1985 7:25 pm (CT) at Royals Stadium in Kansas City, Missouri 65 °F (18 °C), partly cloudy
Team	1	2	3	4	5	6	7	8	9	R	H	E
St. Louis	0	0	0	0	0	0	0	1	0	1	5	0
Kansas City	0	0	0	0	0	0	0	0	2	2	10	0
WP: Dan Quisenberry (1–0) LP: Todd Worrell (0–1)

A pitcher's duel unfolded between Danny Cox and Charlie Leibrandt, the tough-luck loser in Game 2. The game was marked by controversy. In the fourth inning of the scoreless game, the Royals' Frank White may have stolen second base, but was ruled out in a close call. The batter, Pat Sheridan, hit a single to right field two pitches later. If White had been on base when Sheridan singled, the Royals would have likely taken a 1–0 lead. Instead, Leibrandt and Cox traded scoreless innings until the eighth, when pinch-hitter Brian Harper singled home Terry Pendleton, who had singled earlier, to give the Cardinals a 1–0 lead.

The Cardinals' 1–0 lead entering the bottom of the eighth was the result of St. Louis taking the upper hand after two situations that were mirror images of each other: In consecutive half-innings – the bottom of the seventh and the top of the eighth – both teams had runners on first and second with their respective starting pitcher coming to bat. Kansas City manager Dick Howser opted to leave Leibrandt in the game to bat, but the Royals starter struck out to end the inning. In contrast, Whitey Herzog pulled Cardinals starter Cox for pinch hitter Harper, who then had the game's first hit with runners in scoring position to put St. Louis ahead 1–0.

In the bottom of the ninth, Herzog called on rookie reliever Todd Worrell to relieve setup man Ken Dayley, who had pitched the eighth and would have been the winner had the Cardinals won. The first batter, pinch-hitter Jorge Orta, sent a chopping bouncer to the right of Jack Clark. He tossed the ball to Worrell, who tagged the bag ahead of Orta, but Clark's toss was behind Worrell, causing the running Orta to come between umpire Don Denkinger and his view of the lunging Worrell's glove. Denkinger called Orta safe. TV replays – not used by officials for play review until 2008 – indicated that Orta should have been called out, and an argument ensued on the field. The Cardinals argued briefly, but as crew chief and believing he had made the correct call, Denkinger did not reverse it. Orta remained at first. In his book You're Missing a Great Game, Herzog wrote that he later wished he had asked Commissioner Peter Ueberroth, who was in attendance, to overrule the call and declare Orta out. If Ueberroth had refused to do so, Herzog would have pulled his team from the field and forfeited the game.

Instead of one out and no one on, the Royals now had no outs and a runner on first for batter Steve Balboni. Balboni lifted a pop-up in foul territory along the edge of the first base dugout. Jack Clark, who had only recently made the transition from right field to first base that season, lost track of the ball as he looked to find the dugout and the ball dropped on the top step of the dugout. Balboni then singled two pitches later, putting runners at first and second with nobody out. Onix Concepción was sent in as a pinch runner for the slow-footed Balboni. Catcher Jim Sundberg attempted to sacrifice the runners over, but he failed. With two strikes, he bunted anyway, and sent it back to Worrell, who threw to third to force out Orta, the only out the Cardinals would record. Darrell Porter then allowed a passed ball, advancing Concepción and Sundberg to third and second, respectively.

With first base now open and two runners in scoring position, Herzog then chose to walk Royals pinch hitter Hal McRae to set up a potential double play. McRae was replaced by the faster John Wathan to pinch-run to avoid a potential double play. With the bases loaded and one out, Royals pinch hitter Dane Iorg (a former Cardinal who had won a championship ring with them in 1982) blooped a single to right field. Concepción scored the tying run and Sundberg approached the plate with the winning run. Right fielder Andy Van Slyke's throw was on target, but Sundberg slid home safely with the game-winning run.

The Royals celebrated the rally, and mobbed home plate. The Cardinals went to their dressing rooms, only to find champagne waiting for them and plastic over their lockers in anticipation for the celebration that never came. Denkinger stated that he still believed he had made the right call until he later met with Commissioner Peter Ueberroth after the game and had the opportunity to see the replay himself. He would later claim that he was waiting to hear the ball land in Worrell's glove while watching the bag for Orta's foot. Due to the crowd noise in Royals Stadium, he ruled Orta safe because he never heard Worrell catch the ball. "I was in good position, but Worrell is tall, the throw was high, and I couldn't watch his glove and his feet at the same time," Denkinger told Sports Illustrated. "It was a soft toss, and there was so much crowd noise, I couldn't hear the ball hit the glove." ABC showed the play from three different angles; two were high above the field and one was from behind third base, all with what Denkinger claimed he didn't get: a clear view of Clark's throw and Worrell's catch. Denkinger was scheduled to be the home plate umpire in Game 7.

=== Game 7 ===
Bret Saberhagen won Game 7 to clinch Kansas City's first World Series title with a five-hitter.

Sunday, October 27, 1985 7:30 pm (CT) at Royals Stadium in Kansas City, Missouri 61 °F (16 °C), overcast
Team	1	2	3	4	5	6	7	8	9	R	H	E
St. Louis	0	0	0	0	0	0	0	0	0	0	5	0
Kansas City	0	2	3	0	6	0	0	0	X	11	14	0
WP: Bret Saberhagen (2–0) LP: John Tudor (2–1); Home runs: STL: None; KC: Darryl Motley (1)

One night after becoming a father, Bret Saberhagen tossed a five-hitter and got all the offense he needed when Darryl Motley homered to left off John Tudor in the second inning, after a walk to Steve Balboni. In the third, Lonnie Smith led off with a walk, and with one out George Brett hit an infield single. After a double steal, Tudor issued walks to Frank White to load the bases and Jim Sundberg to force in Smith, making it 3–0. Tudor was replaced with Bill Campbell after only 2 1/3 innings. Balboni singled to left off Campbell to score Brett and White to make it 5–0. Tudor walked four and was charged with all five runs. In the dugout, he angrily punched an electrical fan, cutting his pitching hand.

The Royals blew the game open in the bottom of the fifth. A succession of five Cardinal pitchers allowed six Royals runs, five coming after two were out. Campbell gave up a single to Sundberg and was immediately replaced by Jeff Lahti, who allowed four hits to score four runs before being replaced by Ricky Horton. After Horton gave up a single to Brett and fell behind on the count 2-0 to Frank White, Herzog replaced him with Joaquín Andújar, normally a starter but pressed into relief. Andújar allowed an RBI single to White, increasing the Royals lead to 10–0. With Sundberg at the plate (the Royals had batted around), Andújar twice charged home plate umpire Denkinger to disagree with his strike zone. First, Denkinger called an Andújar pitch a ball. Herzog, who had been berating Denkinger for most of the game, rushed from the dugout to defend Andújar, and was ejected — reportedly after saying to Denkinger, "We wouldn't even be here if you hadn't missed the fucking call last night!" According to Denkinger, he replied, "Well, if you guys weren't hitting .120 in this World Series, we wouldn't be here." It was the sixth manager ejection in World Series history; the others were in 1907, 1910, 1935, 1969 and 1976. ABC's Tim McCarver mistakenly said it was the second, after 1969.

The next pitch was also called a ball to walk Sundberg, and Denkinger ejected Andújar, who then charged at Denkinger. It took three teammates to restrain him and get him off the field. Andújar was suspended for the first ten games of the 1986 season for his outburst. Although it has been rumored that Herzog sent in Andújar specifically to bait Denkinger, Herzog himself has said several times that Andújar was the only pitcher who still had anything left in his arm. After Game 5 loser Bob Forsch's first pitch was wild to score Brett, he got out of the fifth-inning nightmare. He pitched a clean sixth inning and Ken Dayley kept the Royals off the scoreboard for the last two innings, but it was not enough as the Cardinals could not score against Saberhagen.

The Cardinals' .185 batting average was the lowest for a seven-game World Series until the New York Yankees hit .183 in the 2001 World Series against the Arizona Diamondbacks. The Cardinals also scored only thirteen total runs—an all-time low for a seven-game series—scoring only once in the final 26 innings of the series. If they had held on for the win in Game 6, they still would have been outscored in the series 15–13.

This was Kansas City's second major professional sports championship, joining the Chiefs' victory in Super Bowl IV in January 1970. These franchises have since added four more championships, with the Royals winning the 2015 World Series, and the Chiefs winning Super Bowls LIV, LVII and LVIII.

== Composite box ==
1985 World Series (4–3): Kansas City Royals (A.L.) over St. Louis Cardinals (N.L.)

Team	1	2	3	4	5	6	7	8	9	R	H	E
Kansas City Royals	1	6	3	4	8	0	2	1	3	28	68	3
St. Louis Cardinals	1	1	2	1	1	1	0	1	5	13	40	2
Total attendance: 327,494 Average attendance: 46,785; Winning player's share: $76,342 Losing player's share: $54,922

== Broadcasting ==
ABC televised the series, with play-by-play announcer Al Michaels and color commentators Jim Palmer and Tim McCarver. This was the first World Series broadcast for McCarver, who would go on to call a record 24 World Series telecasts with ABC, CBS and Fox. Howard Cosell was originally scheduled to be in the booth with Michaels and Palmer, but was removed from his assignment just prior to Game 1 because of the controversy surrounding his book I Never Played the Game. ABC's coverage was simulcast in Canada on the Global Television Network.

CBS Radio broadcast the series nationally, with Jack Buck on play-by-play and Sparky Anderson providing color commentary. Locally, Royals' flagship station WIBW (Topeka) aired the games in Kansas City with Denny Matthews and Fred White alternating on play-by-play and color, while in St. Louis the Cardinals' flagship KMOX simulcast the CBS Radio coverage due to Buck's status as the team's primary local announcer during the regular season, although regular analyst Mike Shannon was sidelined in favor of Anderson.

== Aftermath ==
The Royals became the first team ever to win the World Series after losing the first two games at home. The following year, the New York Mets accomplished the same feat by defeating the Boston Red Sox in seven games in the World Series. In the 1996 World Series, the New York Yankees lost their first two games at home against the defending 1995 World Series champion Atlanta Braves before winning four straight to claim the title. The Royals also were the fifth team in MLB history to come back from a 3–1 deficit to win a best-of-seven World Series, the previous teams being the 1925 Pittsburgh Pirates, 1958 New York Yankees, 1968 Detroit Tigers, and the 1979 Pittsburgh Pirates. The 1985 Royals had also come back from a three games to one deficit to win the American League Championship Series against the Toronto Blue Jays, making them the first and so far only team to do so (the championship series had changed from a best-of-five to a best-of-seven format in 1985). The six elimination games won by the Royals represent a Major League record for a single postseason, a record which would later be equaled by the 2012 San Francisco Giants. The Royals also became the first team to win two Game 7s in one postseason. The 2017 Houston Astros are the only other team to achieve this feat.

In the immediate aftermath of the 1985 World Series, umpire Don Denkinger received many hateful letters from Cardinals fans due to his blown call in Game 6 that essentially cost the Cardinals a World Series. Denkinger contacted Major League Baseball Security, which in turn contacted the FBI, when he received a particularly menacing letter with no return address that said that if the writer saw Denkinger in person, he would "blow him away" with a .357 Magnum. According to Denkinger, FBI agents visited the letter writer and told him, "You're done. This is the end of it. You will not correspond with him in any manner, and life will go on."

Denkinger had other big umpiring assignments after the 1985 Series. He was behind the plate for the All-Star Game the following season, and he was named crew chief for the 1988 ALCS, 1991 World Series, and 1992 ALCS. He retired in 1998, ironically with his last game being at Kauffman Stadium on June 2, 1998. After retirement, Denkinger would lean into his fame of the blown call, regularly appearing at sports memorabilia shows (including ones in St. Louis) willing to autograph photos depicting "The Call". Nevertheless, many publications consider his blown call in Game 6 of the 1985 World Series one of the biggest umpire blunders in MLB history.

In 1987, the Cardinals won the NLCS in seven games over the San Francisco Giants. In the World Series against the Minnesota Twins, after having fallen behind 2-0 at the Hubert H. Humphrey Metrodome, they won their next three games at home. However, back at the Metrodome, they lost the last two and again fell one game short of a World Series title. It would be the Cardinals' last World Series appearance until 2004. The Cardinals did not win another World Series until 2006.

The Royals did not play in another postseason game until the 2014 American League Wild Card Game, and did not win another World Series until the following season, in 2015.

The introduction of interleague play to major league baseball in 1997 allowed the I-70 Series to be revived in regular season games each year. Through the 2022 season, the Cardinals lead the regular-season interleague series, 73-47, though Kansas City still holds the World Series win over St. Louis, as it was the last and only time the two teams have faced off in the postseason.

== See also ==
- 1985 Japan Series
- 1985 MLB Postseason
- Interstate 70 in Missouri
