= Ricky Horton =

American baseball player (born 1959)

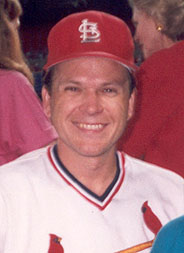
- Pitcher
- Born: July 30, 1959 (age 66); Poughkeepsie, New York, U.S.
- Batted: Left Threw: Left

MLB debut
- April 7, 1984, for the St. Louis Cardinals

Last MLB appearance
- July 23, 1990, for the St. Louis Cardinals

MLB statistics
- Win–loss record: 32–27
- Earned run average: 3.76
- Strikeouts: 319
- Stats at Baseball Reference

Teams
- St. Louis Cardinals (1984–1987); Chicago White Sox (1988); Los Angeles Dodgers (1988–1989); St. Louis Cardinals (1989–1990)

Career highlights and awards
- World Series champion (1988)

Ricky Neal Horton (born July 30, 1959) is an American sports commentator and former professional baseball pitcher who is a radio broadcaster for the St. Louis Cardinals of Major League Baseball (MLB). He played in MLB for the Cardinals, Chicago White Sox, and Los Angeles Dodgers.

== Early life and amateur career ==
Horton was born in Poughkeepsie, New York. He graduated from F. D. Roosevelt High School, in nearby Hyde Park. Horton attended and played college baseball at the University of Virginia. Horton played collegiate summer baseball for the Chatham A's of the Cape Cod Baseball League in 1978 and was named a league all-star. During the 1980 season, he led the Cavaliers in innings pitched (66.2), earned run average (2.70) and strikeouts (70).

== Playing career ==
Horton was drafted by the St. Louis Cardinals in the 4th round of the 1980 amateur draft. Horton's first major league hit came on May 21, 1984, off Nolan Ryan.

In 1984, Horton won a career-high nine games as a rookie for the Cardinals. While with the Cardinals, he appeared in the 1985 World Series and 1987 World Series. He pitched in the 1988 World Series as a member of the Los Angeles Dodgers, who won the championship.

== Coaching and broadcasting career ==
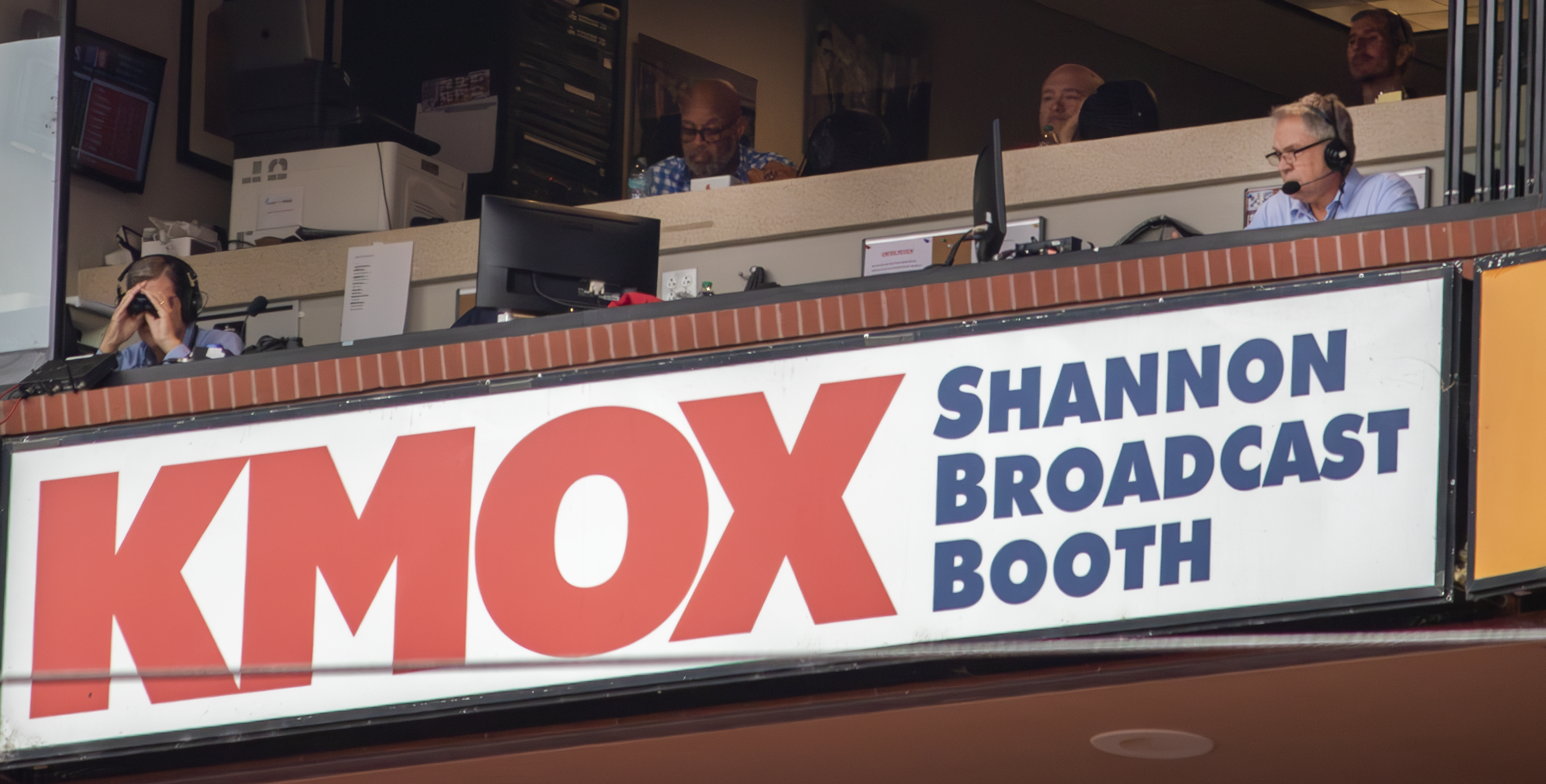
Rickey Horton in the booth (Right). 2024.

In 1991, Horton was a minor league pitching coach in the Cleveland Indians farm system. In 1993, he became the director of the St. Louis Fellowship of Christian Athletes.

In 1997, Horton began filling in on Cardinals television broadcasts on FSN Midwest and radio broadcasts on the Cardinals Radio Network. In 2003, he joined the three-man FSN Midwest television broadcast team, working roughly 100 games per year as well as post-game analysis. As of 2022, he provides color commentary on KMOX radio broadcasts.

== Personal ==
Horton briefly appeared in the film Field of Dreams, shown pitching for the White Sox in a scene where Ray Kinsella's young daughter is watching baseball on television. He is a 2024 inductee into the Dutchess County Baseball Hall of Fame.

Horton and his wife, Ann, reside in St. Louis.
