= 1989 Toronto Blue Jays season =

1989 Toronto Blue Jays
- American League East champions
- League: American League
- Division: East
- Ballpark: Exhibition Stadium (to May 28); SkyDome (from June 5)
- City: Toronto
- Record: 89–73 (.549)
- Divisional place: 1st
- Owners: Labatt Breweries, Imperial Trust, Canadian Imperial Bank of Commerce
- General managers: Pat Gillick
- Managers: Jimy Williams, Cito Gaston
- Television: CFTO-TV (Don Chevrier, Tony Kubek, Fergie Olver); The Sports Network (Fergie Olver, Buck Martinez)
- Radio: CJCL (AM) (Jerry Howarth, Tom Cheek)

The 1989 Toronto Blue Jays season was the franchise's 13th season of Major League Baseball. It resulted in the Blue Jays finishing first in the American League East with a record of 89 wins and 73 losses. The Blue Jays' ace pitcher Dave Stieb led the staff with 17 victories, and the team was offensively buoyed by the league's home run king Fred McGriff. Toronto won the AL East pennant in the final weekend of the season against the favored Baltimore Orioles. The Blue Jays lost the ALCS in five games to the eventual World Series champion Oakland Athletics. It was the team's last season at Exhibition Stadium, before moving to SkyDome halfway into the season. The Blue Jays hit eight grand slams, the most in MLB in 1989.

== Transactions ==
Transactions by the Toronto Blue Jays during the off-season before the 1989 season.

=== October 1988 ===
October 9	Signed amateur free agent Carlos Delgado to a contract.
October 15	Steve Davis granted free agency. Lou Thornton granted free agency. Dave Walsh granted free agency.
October 24	Jim Clancy granted free agency.
October 28	Released Frank Wills.
October 31	Released Doug Bair.

=== November 1988 ===
November 4	Mike Flanagan granted free agency. Rick Leach granted free agency.

=== December 1988 ===
December 5	Gerónimo Berroa drafted by the Atlanta Braves in the 1988 MLB Rule 5 draft. Matt Stark drafted by the Atlanta Braves in the 1988 MLB Rule 5 draft. Eric Yelding drafted by the Chicago Cubs in the 1988 MLB Rule 5 draft.
December 6	Drafted Tom Gilles from the Minnesota Twins in the 1988 Minor League Draft. Drafted Mauro Gozzo from the Kansas City Royals in the 1988 Minor League Draft.
December 22	Player rights of Cecil Fielder sold to the Hanshin Tigers of the NPB.
December 24	Re-signed free agent Mike Flanagan to a contract.

=== January 1989 ===
January 12	Re-signed free agent Frank Wills to a contract.
January 18	Signed free agent Bob Brenly from the San Francisco Giants to a contract.
January 23	Signed free agent Tom Lawless from the St. Louis Cardinals to a one-year, $175,000 contract.
January 28	Signed free agent Chico Walker from the Chicago Cubs to a contract.

=== February 1989 ===
February 17	Re-signed free agent Doug Bair to a one-year, $150,000 contract.

=== March 1989 ===
March 9	Acquired DeWayne Buice from the California Angels for Cliff Young.
March 29	Player rights of Mark Eichhorn sold to the Atlanta Braves.

== Regular season ==
The regular season would represent a turning point for the Blue Jays in many different ways. The Blue Jays started the 1989 season in Kansas City against the Royals. Behind the pitching of Jimmy Key, the Jays won the first game of the season 4–3. The rest of the month would result in a losing record for the Jays. After the first month of the season, the Blue Jays had 10 wins and 20 losses and sat 6.5 games behind the Baltimore Orioles in the standings. The result was that Pat Gillick made his first trade in 605 days. On April 30, Gillick sent Jesse Barfield to the New York Yankees in exchange for Al Leiter. The reason for the deal was that management was convinced that Rob Ducey was ready to be an everyday outfielder. The spot eventually went to the surprising Junior Felix that year, and Ducey never became the everyday player the Jays imagined him to be.

The Blue Jays had never fired a manager in the middle of the season. After the Jays were swept by the Minnesota Twins in a three-game series, including a 13–1 loss in the final game of the series, the Jays had 12 wins and 24 losses. The Jays had also lost 15 of their last 19 games. Gillick decided that a change was needed. On Monday, May 15, Jimy Williams had become the first Jays manager to be fired in mid-season. Williams would be replaced by Cito Gaston, the first black manager in the history of the franchise.

The SkyDome was intended to be ready in time for the beginning of the season. However, due to construction delays caused in part by widespread construction worker strikes across Ontario, this was postponed and the Blue Jays began their season at Exhibition Stadium. The Blue Jays' last game at Exhibition Stadium was against the first team they played there, the Chicago White Sox. From there, the Blue Jays opened the new SkyDome with a loss to the Milwaukee Brewers. On September 30, they clinched the American League East division title at the new ballpark.

=== Notable games ===
- April 16, 1989 – Blue Jays third baseman Kelly Gruber hits for the cycle in a 15–8 victory over the Kansas City Royals.
- May 4, 1989 – In a game versus the California Angels, Junior Felix hits a home run in his first Major League at-bat, becoming only the 60th Major Leaguer to achieve the feat.
- May 28, 1989 – The Blue Jays play their final game at Exhibition Stadium, a 7–5 10-inning win over the Chicago White Sox. Coincidentally, the White Sox had been the Jays' opponents in their first game at Exhibition Stadium (also the first game in franchise history) twelve years before. George Bell hit the game-winning home run.
- June 4, 1989 – The Blue Jays stage a remarkable comeback in a game against the Red Sox in Boston. Trailing 10–0 after six innings, they slowly close the gap, finally taking an 11–10 lead on a ninth-inning grand slam by Ernie Whitt. Boston ties the score in the bottom half of the inning, but Junior Felix smokes a two-run home run in the top of the 12th inning, giving Toronto a 13–11 victory.
- June 5, 1989 – The Blue Jays play their first game in the brand-new SkyDome, a 5–3 loss to the Milwaukee Brewers.
- August 4, 1989 – With the Blue Jays leading the New York Yankees 2–0, Dave Stieb comes one out away from pitching a perfect game, but the Yankees' Roberto Kelly cracks a double into left field to break it up. Steve Sax then singles Kelly home to cut the lead to 2–1, but the Blue Jays ace holds on for the victory. It marks the third time in two seasons that Stieb has lost a no-hitter with two out in the ninth inning.
- September 30, 1989 – In the next-to-last game of the regular season (and the last edition of NBC Sports' Saturday afternoon Game of the Week before the series moved to CBS the following season), the Blue Jays clinch their second American League East division title. Tom Henke strikes out the Baltimore Orioles' Larry Sheets for the final out.

=== Opening Day starters ===
- Jesse Barfield
- George Bell
- Pat Borders
- Bob Brenly
- Kelly Gruber
- Jimmy Key
- Manuel Lee
- Nelson Liriano
- Fred McGriff
- Lloyd Moseby

=== Season standings ===
AL East
Team	W	L	Pct.	GB	Home	Road
Toronto Blue Jays	89	73	.549	—	46‍–‍35	43‍–‍38
Baltimore Orioles	87	75	.537	2	47‍–‍34	40‍–‍41
Boston Red Sox	83	79	.512	6	46‍–‍35	37‍–‍44
Milwaukee Brewers	81	81	.500	8	45‍–‍36	36‍–‍45
New York Yankees	74	87	.460	14½	41‍–‍40	33‍–‍47
Cleveland Indians	73	89	.451	16	41‍–‍40	32‍–‍49
Detroit Tigers	59	103	.364	30	38‍–‍43	21‍–‍60

=== Record vs. opponents ===
1989 American League record Sources:
Team	BAL	BOS	CAL	CWS	CLE	DET	KC	MIL	MIN	NYY	OAK	SEA	TEX	TOR
Baltimore	—	6–7	6–6	6–6	7–6	10–3	6–6	7–6	4–8	8–5	5–7	6–6	9–3	7–6
Boston	7–6	—	4–8	7–5	8–5	11–2	4–8	6–7	6–6	7–6	7–5	5–7	6–6	5–8
California	6–6	8–4	—	8–5	5–7	11–1	4–9	7–5	11–2	6–6	5–8	7–6	6–7	7–5
Chicago	6–6	5–7	5–8	—	7–5	4–8	6–7	10–2	5–8	5–6	5–8	7–6	3–10	1–11
Cleveland	6–7	5–8	7–5	5–7	—	5–8	8–4	3–10	5–7	9–4	2–10	6–6	7–5	5–8
Detroit	3–10	2–11	1–11	8–4	8–5	—	6–6	6–7	5–7	6–7	4–8	4–8	4–8	2–11
Kansas City	6–6	8–4	9–4	7–6	4–8	6–6	—	8–4	7–6	6–6	7–6	9–4	8–5	7–5
Milwaukee	6–7	7–6	5–7	2–10	10–3	7–6	4–8	—	9–3	8–5	5–7	7–5	5–7	6–7
Minnesota	8–4	6–6	2–11	8–5	7–5	7–5	6–7	3–9	—	6–6	6–7	7–6	5–8	9–3
New York	5–8	6–7	6–6	6–5	4–9	7–6	6–6	5–8	6–6	—	3–9	8–4	5–7	7–6
Oakland	7–5	5–7	8–5	8–5	10–2	8–4	6–7	7–5	7–6	9–3	—	9–4	8–5	7–5
Seattle	6–6	7–5	6–7	6–7	6–6	8–4	4–9	5–7	6–7	4–8	4–9	—	6–7	5–7
Texas	3–9	6–6	7–6	10–3	5–7	8–4	5–8	7–5	8–5	7–5	5–8	7–6	—	5–7
Toronto	6–7	8–5	5–7	11–1	8–5	11–2	5–7	7–6	3–9	6–7	5–7	7–5	7–5	—

=== Transactions ===
Transactions for the Toronto Blue Jays during the 1989 regular season.

==== April 1989 ====
April 30	Acquired Al Leiter from the New York Yankees for Jesse Barfield.

==== May 1989 ====
May 1	Signed amateur free agent Robert Pérez to a contract.

==== June 1989 ====
June 12	Released Dane Johnson.
June 16	Player rights of Doug Bair sold to the Pittsburgh Pirates.
June 24	Signed free agent Ozzie Virgil Jr. from the Atlanta Braves to a contract.

==== July 1989 ====
July 18	Released Bob Brenly.
July 31	Acquired Mookie Wilson from the New York Mets for Jeff Musselman and Mike Brady. Selected Lee Mazzilli off of waivers from the New York Mets.

==== August 1989 ====
August 24	Acquired Jim Acker from the Atlanta Braves for Francisco Cabrera and Tony Castillo.
August 26	Signed amateur free agent Paul Spoljaric to a contract.

==== Draft picks ====
- June 5, 1989: John Olerud was drafted by the Blue Jays in the 3rd round of the 1989 amateur draft. Player signed August 26, 1989.
- June 5, 1989: Aaron Small was drafted by the Toronto Blue Jays in the 22nd round of the 1989 amateur draft. Player signed June 8, 1989.

=== Roster ===
1989 Toronto Blue Jays
Roster
Pitchers: 24 Jim Acker; 38 DeWayne Buice; 27 Tony Castillo; 55 John Cerutti; 32 Steve Cummings; 46 Mike Flanagan; 47 Mauro Gozzo; 50 Tom Henke; 42 Xavier Hernandez; 22 Jimmy Key; 28 Al Leiter; 13 Jeff Musselman; 45 José Núñez; 33 Alex Sanchez; 37 Dave Stieb; 30 Todd Stottlemyre; 31 Duane Ward; 36 David Wells; 44 Frank Wills	Catchers: 10 Pat Borders; 16 Greg Myers; 21 Ozzie Virgil; 12 Ernie Whitt; Infielders: 1 Tony Fernández; 17 Kelly Gruber; 14 Alexis Infante; 4 Manuel Lee; 2 Nelson Liriano; 19 Fred McGriff; 9 John Olerud	Outfielders: 29 Jesse Barfield; 34 Kevin Batiste; 11 George Bell; 20 Rob Ducey; 54 Junior Félix; 29 Glenallen Hill; 18 Tom Lawless; 15 Lloyd Moseby; 3 Mookie Wilson; Other batters: 9 Bob Brenly; 21 Francisco Cabrera; 13 Lee Mazzilli; 5 Rance Mulliniks	Manager: 43 Cito Gaston; 3 Jimy Williams; Coaches: 43 Cito Gaston (hitting); 7 John McLaren (third base); 25 Mike Squires (first base); 8 John Sullivan (bullpen); 41 Al Widmar (pitching)

=== Game log ===
1989 Game Log
April: 9–16 (Home: 4–5; Away: 5–11)

#	Date	Opponent	Score	Win	Loss	Save	Attendance	Record
1	April 3	@ Royals	4–3	Key (1–0)	Gubicza (0–1)	Henke (1)	38,595	1–0
2	April 5	@ Royals	1–2	Gordon (1–0)	Stottlemyre (0–1)		17,126	1–1
3	April 6	@ Royals	2–3	Montgomery (1–0)	Ward (0–1)	Farr (1)	18,883	1–2
4	April 7	@ Rangers	9–10	Castillo (1–0)	Guante (1–1)	Henke (2)	22,914	2–2
5	April 8	@ Rangers	4–5	Moyer (1–0)	Key (1–1)	Russell (2)	26,073	2–3
6	April 9	@ Rangers	2–3	Rogers (1–0)	Henke (0–1)		19,498	2–4
7	April 10	@ Yankees	8–0	Stieb (1–0)	Hawkins (0–2)		17,192	3–4
8	April 11	@ Yankees	11–6 (10)	Henke (1–1)	Righetti (0–1)		20,277	4–4
9	April 12	@ Yankees	3–5	Candelaria (1–1)	Castillo (1–1)	Guetterman (1)	17,900	4–5
10	April 14	Royals	3–0	Key (2–1)	Leibrandt (0–1)		46,028	5–5
11	April 15	Royals	10–5	Aquino (2–0)	Ward (0–2)		25,247	5–6
12	April 16	Royals	15–8	Wells (1–0)	Saberhagen (1–1)	Castillo (1)	35,210	6–6
13	April 17	Yankees	7–2	Hawkins (1–2)	Flanagan (0–1)		23,260	6–7
14	April 18	Yankees	2–0	LaPoint (1–1)	Musselman (0–1)	Righetti (1)	25,040	6–8
15	April 19	Yankees	4–2	Candelaria (2–1)	Key (2–2)	Guetterman (3)	26,471	6–9
16	April 21	Rangers	6–3	Stieb (2–0)	Brown (1–1)	Ward (1)	22,186	7–9
17	April 22	Rangers	4–2	Ward (1–2)	Hough (2–1)		27,278	8–9
18	April 23	Rangers	1–4	Ryan (2–1)	Stottlemyre (0–2)		31,473	8–10
19	April 24	@ Athletics	4–5	Nelson (2–1)	Henke (1–2)		25,099	8–11
20	April 25	@ Athletics	1–3	Davis (2–1)	Cerutti (0–1)	Eckersley (7)	12,437	8–12
21	April 26	@ Mariners	6–7	Trout (2–1)	Wells (1–1)	Jackson (1)	7,399	8–13
22	April 27	@ Mariners	6–1	Flanagan (1–1)	Dunne (0–1)		8,600	9–13
23	April 28	@ Angels	0–9	McCaskill (4–1)	Stottlemyre (0–3)		30,958	9–14
24	April 29	@ Angels	3–4 (10)	Minton (1–0)	Ward (1–3)		49,906	9–15
25	April 30	@ Angels	0–1 (11)	McClure (1–0)	Henke (1–3)		31,125	9–16

May: 11–15 (Home: 8–9; Away: 3–6)

#	Date	Opponent	Score	Win	Loss	Save	Attendance	Record
26	May 2	Athletics	5–8	Honeycutt (1–0)	Ward (1–4)	Plunk (1)	23,439	9–17
27	May 3	Athletics	2–0	Flanagan (2–1)	Moore (3–2)		22,370	10–17
28	May 4	Angels	2–3 (10)	Harvey (1–0)	Ward (1–5)	Minton (3)	21,188	10–18
29	May 5	Angels	3–5	Abbott (2–2)	Cerutti (0–2)	Harvey (5)	24,188	10–19
30	May 6	Angels	4–5	McClure (2–0)	Ward (1–6)		39,123	10–20
--	May 7	Angels	Postponed (rain) Rescheduled for July 17					
31	May 8	Mariners	10–1	Stieb (3–0)	Dunne (1–2)		23,293	11–20
32	May 9	Mariners	4–3	Hanson (4–2)	Flanagan (2–2)	Schooler (7)	24,234	12–20
33	May 10	Mariners	2–3	Key (3–2)	Langston (4–4)		33,216	12–21
34	May 12	@ Twins	5–6	Berenguer (1–0)	Wells (1–2)	Reardon (6)	24,073	12–22
35	May 13	@ Twins	8–10	Rawley (3–4)	Stieb (3–1)	Reardon (7)	29,712	12–23
36	May 14	@ Twins	1–13	Viola (2–5)	Flanagan (2–3)		33,980	12–24
37	May 15	Indians	5–3	Key (4–2)	Farrell (2–3)		22,330	13–24
38	May 16	Indians	7–6	Henke (2–3)	Atherton (0–2)	Ward (2)	23,214	14–24
39	May 17	Indians	3–6	Black (2–5)	Stieb (3–2)	Jones (7)	24,406	14–25
40	May 19	@ White Sox	9–3	Flanagan (3–3)	King (4–4)		11,282	15–25
41	May 20	@ White Sox	11–1	Key (5–2)	Hillegas (1–5)		18,029	16–25
42	May 21	@ White Sox	9–3	Cerutti (1–2)	Pérez (2–5)	Ward (3)	16,488	17–25
43	May 22	Twins	2–6	Anderson (5–2)	Stieb (3–3)		40,134	17–26
44	May 23	Twins	2–1	Wells (2–2)	Berenguer (2–2)		24,443	18–26
45	May 24	Twins	4–10	Viola (3–6)	Flanagan (3–4)		27,138	18–27
46	May 26	White Sox	11–3	Key (6–2)	Hillegas (1–6)		30,105	19–27
47	May 27	White Sox	3–5	Pérez (3–5)	Cerutti (1–3)	Thigpen (7)	37,437	19–28
48	May 28	White Sox	7–5 (10)	Henke (3–3)	Thigpen (0–1)		46,120	20–28
49	May 29	@ Indians	3–5	Candiotti (6–2)	Flanagan (3–5)	Jones (10)	19,947	20–29
50	May 30	@ Indians	2–6	Farrell (3–5)	Sanchez (0–1)		6,204	20–30
51	May 31	@ Indians	4–7	Black (4–6)	Key (6–3)	Jones (11)	12,890	20–31

June: 17–10 (Home: 6–5; Away: 11–5)

#	Date	Opponent	Score	Win	Loss	Save	Attendance	Record
52	June 2	@ Red Sox	7–2	Cerutti (2–3)	Dopson (5–4)	Ward (4)	33,584	21–31
53	June 3	@ Red Sox	10–2	Stieb (4–3)	Boddicker (3–5)		33,942	22–31
54	June 4	@ Red Sox	13–11 (12)	Ward (2–6)	Lamp (0–1)		33,760	23–31
55	June 5	Brewers	3–5	August (5–6)	Key (6–4)	Plesac (13)	48,378	23–32
56	June 6	Brewers	4–6	Aldrich (1–0)	Ward (2–7)	Crim (3)	45,520	23–33
57	June 7	Brewers	4–2	Cerutti (3–3)	Bosio (6–4)		45,372	24–33
58	June 9	Tigers	2–0	Stieb (5–3)	Tanana (5–6)	Wells (1)	48,219	25–33
59	June 10	Tigers	8–11	Williams (3–2)	Key (6–5)		48,430	25–34
60	June 11	Tigers	4–0	Flanagan (4–5)	Schwabe (1–1)	Ward (5)	48,274	26–34
61	June 12	Tigers	5–4 (11)	Henke (4–3)	Gibson (2–4)		48,531	27–34
62	June 13	@ Brewers	4–3	Ward (3–7)	Plesac (2–3)		15,469	28–34
63	June 14	@ Brewers	6–1	Stieb (6–3)	Krueger (2–1)		14,808	29–34
64	June 15	@ Brewers	4–6	Fossas (1–0)	Key (6–6)	Plesac (15)	16,964	29–35
65	June 16	Mariners	4–3	Henke (5–3)	Schooler (1–1)		48,363	30–35
66	June 17	Mariners	3–2	Ward (4–7)	Jackson (2–1)		48,336	31–35
67	June 18	Mariners	2–8	Bankhead (4–4)	Wills (0–1)		48,329	31–36
68	June 19	@ Angels	8–1	Stieb (7–3)	Finley (7–6)		24,430	32–36
69	June 20	@ Angels	6–2	Key (7–6)	McCaskill (7–4)		23,956	33–36
70	June 21	@ Angels	6–1 (14)	Henke (6–3)	Minton (1–2)		24,259	34–36
71	June 22	@ Athletics	4–2 (13)	Hernandez (1–0)	Corsi (0–1)	Wells (2)	21,418	35–36
72	June 23	@ Athletics	10–8	Buice (1–0)	Young (2–8)	Henke (3)	27,795	36–36
73	June 24	@ Athletics	1–7	Stewart (12–3)	Stieb (7–4)		39,659	36–37
74	June 25	@ Athletics	3–6	Davis (6–3)	Key (7–7)	Honeycutt (8)	49,219	36–38
75	June 27	@ Orioles	6–16	Tibbs (5–0)	Flanagan (4–6)		30,136	36–39
76	June 28	@ Orioles	1–2	Hickey (2–2)	Cerutti (3–4)	Olson (12)	35,757	36–40
77	June 29	@ Orioles	11–1	Cummings (1–0)	Schmidt (7–7)		39,528	37–40
78	June 30	Red Sox	1–3	Boddicker (5–7)	Wells (2–3)	Murphy (3)	48,429	37–41

July: 15–12 (Home: 6–7; Away: 9–5)

#	Date	Opponent	Score	Win	Loss	Save	Attendance	Record
79	July 1	Red Sox	1–3	Hetzel (1–0)	Stottlemyre (0–4)	Smith (10)	48,639	37–42
80	July 2	Red Sox	1–4 (11)	Murphy (1–3)	Wells (2–4)	Smith (11)	48,516	37–43
81	July 3	Red Sox	3–2	Cerutti (4–4)	Smithson (4–7)	Ward (6)	48,483	38–43
82	July 4	Orioles	0–8	Schmidt (8–7)	Stieb (7–5)	Williamson (7)	44,025	38–44
83	July 5	Orioles	4–5	Milacki (5–8)	Key (7–8)	Olson (13)	49,239	38–45
84	July 6	Orioles	4–1	Stottlemyre (1–4)	Ballard (10–4)	Ward (7)	46,629	39–45
85	July 7	@ Tigers	6–4	Cummings (2–0)	Hernández (2–2)	Henke (4)	25,213	40–45
86	July 8	@ Tigers	8–3	Cerutti (5–4)	Alexander (4–9)	Ward (8)	31,342	41–45
87	July 9	@ Tigers	2–0	Stieb (8–5)	Tanana (7–9)	Henke (5)	32,428	42–45
88	July 13	Athletics	7–11	Burns (5–2)	Key (7–9)		48,207	42–46
89	July 14	Athletics	4–1	Stieb (9–5)	Welch (10–5)	Ward (9)	48,325	43–46
90	July 15	Athletics	6–1	Flanagan (5–6)	Stewart (13–5)		48,238	44–46
91	July 16	Athletics	2–6	Moore (12–5)	Cerutti (5–5)	Burns (7)	48,405	44–47
92	July 17	Angels	6–4	Wells (3–4)	Abbott (8–6)	Henke (6)		45–47
93	July 17	Angels	5–4	Wells (4–4)	McClure (2–1)	Henke (7)	48,641	46–47
94	July 18	Angels	0–1	Blyleven (10–2)	Key (7–10)		48,717	46–48
95	July 20	@ Mariners	2–5	Bankhead (10–4)	Stieb (9–6)	Powell (2)	15,723	46–49
96	July 21	@ Mariners	8–1	Flanagan (6–6)	Harris (1–3)		17,591	47–49
97	July 22	@ Mariners	7–1	Cerutti (6–5)	Dunne (1–5)	Ward (10)	22,044	48–49
98	July 23	@ Mariners	2–5	Johnson (4–2)	Key (7–11)		17,973	48–50
99	July 24	@ Rangers	6–3	Stottlemyre (2–4)	Álvarez (0–1)	Henke (8)	33,754	49–50
100	July 25	@ Rangers	4–0	Stieb (10–6)	Ryan (11–6)	Ward (11)	25,297	50–50
101	July 26	@ Rangers	1–11	Brown (9–6)	Flanagan (6–7)		16,633	50–51
102	July 28	@ Yankees	6–2	Cerutti (7–5)	LaPoint (6–9)		37,222	51–51
103	July 29	@ Yankees	2–7	Cary (1–0)	Key (7–12)		42,179	51–52
104	July 30	@ Yankees	6–7	Guetterman (3–5)	Ward (4–8)		45,107	51–53
105	July 31	@ Yankees	6–5	Wells (5–4)	Hawkins (12–10)	Henke (9)	21,019	52–53

August: 20–9 (Home: 6–4; Away: 14–5)

#	Date	Opponent	Score	Win	Loss	Save	Attendance	Record
106	August 1	Royals	1–2	Saberhagen (11–5)	Stottlemyre (2–5)		48,528	52–54
107	August 2	Royals	8–0	Cerutti (8–5)	Gubicza (9–9)		48,765	53–54
108	August 3	Royals	0–5	Gordon (12–4)	Key (7–13)		48,731	53–55
109	August 4	Yankees	2–1	Stieb (11–6)	Parker (3–2)		48,789	54–55
110	August 5	Yankees	4–5	Hawkins (13–10)	Ward (4–9)	Righetti (18)	49,155	54–56
111	August 6	Yankees	6–5	Stottlemyre (3–5)	Terrell (0–2)		49,025	55–56
112	August 7	Rangers	2–1	Cerutti (9–5)	Jeffcoat (5–5)		48,773	56–56
113	August 8	Rangers	7–0	Gozzo (1–0)	Witt (9–10)		48,689	57–56
114	August 9	Rangers	3–4	Hough (7–11)	Stieb (11–7)	Russell (24)	48,962	57–57
115	August 11	@ Royals	2–6	Saberhagen (13–5)	Flanagan (6–8)		40,027	57–58
116	August 12	@ Royals	2–0	Stottlemyre (4–5)	Gubicza (10–10)	Henke (10)	40,934	58–58
117	August 13	@ Royals	3–8	Gordon (14–4)	Cerutti (9–6)		33,619	58–59
118	August 14	@ Red Sox	4–2	Gozzo (2–0)	Boddicker (10–9)	Henke (11)	35,058	59–59
119	August 15	@ Red Sox	7–2	Stieb (12–7)	Smithson (6–11)	Ward (12)	34,800	60–59
120	August 16	@ Red Sox	7–3	Wells (6–4)	Murphy (3–6)	Henke (12)	35,310	61–59
121	August 17	@ Orioles	6–11	Ballard (12–6)	Cerutti (9–7)		40,147	61–60
122	August 18	@ Orioles	9–2	Gozzo (3–0)	Johnson (2–2)		31,668	62–60
123	August 19	@ Orioles	5–1	Key (8–13)	Milacki (7–11)		38,111	63–60
124	August 20	@ Orioles	2–7	Harnisch (3–6)	Stieb (12–8)	Thurmond (4)	37,242	63–61
125	August 22	Tigers	3–2 (14)	Gozzo (4–0)	Núñez (2–3)		49,072	64–61
126	August 23	Tigers	11–4	Wills (1–1)	Robinson (3–3)		49,233	65–61
127	August 24	Tigers	11–3	Flanagan (7–8)	Morris (3–11)		49,201	66–61
128	August 25	Brewers	3–1	Key (9–13)	Peterek (0–1)	Henke (13)	49,457	67–61
129	August 26	Brewers	7–0	Stieb (13–8)	Higuera (9–5)		49,507	68–61
130	August 27	Brewers	5–4	Stottlemyre (5–5)	Bosio (14–9)	Ward (13)	49,507	69–61
131	August 28	Brewers	2–8	Filer (5–2)	Cerutti (9–8)	Krueger (3)	49,219	69–62
132	August 29	White Sox	3–2	Flanagan (8–8)	Pall (4–5)	Henke (14)	49,565	70–62
133	August 30	White Sox	2–1	Key (10–13)	Dotson (4–8)	Ward (14)	49,435	71–62
134	August 31	White Sox	5–1	Stieb (14–8)	Rosenberg (4–10)		49,422	72–62

September: 17–10 (Home: 8–3; Away: 9–7)

#	Date	Opponent	Score	Win	Loss	Save	Attendance	Record
135	September 1	Twins	7–3	Stottlemyre (6–5)	Guthrie (1–1)		49,350	73–62
136	September 2	Twins	4–2	Cerutti (10–8)	Smith (10–5)	Henke (15)	49,291	74–62
137	September 3	Twins	4–9	Aguilera (1–3)	Flanagan (8–9)		49,073	74–63
138	September 4	@ White Sox	5–2	Key (11–13)	Dotson (4–9)	Henke (16)	9,318	75–63
139	September 5	@ White Sox	6–1	Stieb (15–8)	Rosenberg (4–11)		7,858	76–63
140	September 6	@ White Sox	4–2	Stottlemyre (7–5)	King (7–9)	Ward (15)	7,350	77–63
141	September 7	@ Indians	12–4	Cerutti (11–8)	Candiotti (12–8)		6,098	78–63
142	September 8	@ Indians	4–5	Jones (7–8)	Acker (0–1)		13,489	78–64
143	September 9	@ Indians	7–5 (16)	Wills (2–1)	Kaiser (0–1)		15,154	79–64
144	September 10	@ Indians	5–4 (10)	Acker (1–1)	Olin (1–2)		12,045	80–64
145	September 12	@ Twins	2–8	West (3–1)	Stottlemyre (7–6)		14,849	80–65
146	September 13	@ Twins	2–3	Tapani (2–0)	Cerutti (11–9)	Reardon (29)	14,903	80–66
147	September 14	@ Twins	0–2	Guthrie (2–1)	Flanagan (8–10)	Reardon (30)	14,262	80–67
148	September 15	Indians	5–2	Key (12–13)	Swindell (13–5)	Henke (17)	49,444	81–67
149	September 16	Indians	3–2 (11)	Wells (7–4)	Jones (7–9)		49,218	82–67
150	September 17	Indians	2–1 (10)	Acker (2–1)	Bailes (4–9)		49,501	83–67
151	September 18	Red Sox	3–6	Boddicker (13–11)	Cerutti (11–10)	Murphy (8)	49,579	83–68
152	September 19	Red Sox	6–5 (13)	Henke (7–3)	Harris (2–2)		49,352	84–68
153	September 20	Red Sox	3–10	Clemens (16–10)	Key (12–14)		49,571	84–69
154	September 22	@ Brewers	7–3	Stieb (16–8)	Reuss (9–8)		15,569	85–69
155	September 23	@ Brewers	1–4	August (12–11)	Stottlemyre (7–7)	Plesac (32)	24,640	85–70
156	September 24	@ Brewers	3–8	Filer (7–3)	Cerutti (11–11)	Crim (7)	17,485	85–71
157	September 25	@ Tigers	2–0	Key (13–14)	Dubois (0–4)	Henke (18)	15,990	86–71
158	September 26	@ Tigers	3–4	Henneman (11–4)	Ward (4–10)		16,185	86–72
159	September 27	@ Tigers	8–1	Stieb (17–8)	Alexander (6–18)	Henke (19)	18,331	87–72
160	September 29	Orioles	2–1 (11)	Henke (8–3)	Williamson (10–4)		49,636	88–72
161	September 30	Orioles	4–3	Wills (3–1)	Williamson (10–5)	Henke (20)	49,553	89–72

October: 0–1 (Home: 0–1; Away: 0–0)

#	Date	Opponent	Score	Win	Loss	Save	Attendance	Record
162	October 1	Orioles	5–7	McDonald (1–0)	Gozzo (4–1)		49,469	89–73

1989 Playoff Game Log
American League Championship Series: 1–4

#	Date	Opponent	Score	Win	Loss	Save	Attendance	Series
1	October 3	@ Athletics	3–7	Stewart (1–0)	Stieb (0–1)		49,435	0–1
2	October 4	@ Athletics	3–6	Moore (1–0)	Stottlemyre (0–1)	Eckersley (1)	49,444	0–2
3	October 6	Athletics	7–3	Key (1–0)	Davis (0–1)		50,268	1–2
4	October 7	Athletics	5–6	Welch (1–0)	Flanagan (0–1)	Eckersley (2)	50,076	1–3
5	October 8	Athletics	3–4	Stewart (2–0)	Stieb (0–2)	Eckersley (3)	50,024	1–4

== Player stats ==
= Indicates team leader

= Indicates league leader

=== Batting ===
==== Starters by position ====
Note: Pos = Position; G = Games played; AB = At bats; H = Hits; Avg. = Batting average; HR = Home runs; RBI = Runs batted in

Pos	Player	G	AB	H	Avg.	HR	RBI
C	Ernie Whitt	129	385	101	.262	11	53
1B	Fred McGriff	161	551	148	.269	36	92
2B	Nelson Liriano	132	418	110	.263	5	53
3B	Kelly Gruber	135	545	158	.290	18	73
SS	Tony Fernández	140	573	147	.257	11	64
LF	George Bell	153	613	182	.297	18	104
CF	Lloyd Moseby	135	502	111	.221	11	43
RF	Junior Félix	110	415	107	.258	9	46
DH	Rance Mulliniks	103	273	65	.238	3	29

==== Other batters ====
Note: G = Games played; AB = At bats; H = Hits; Avg. = Batting average; HR = Home runs; RBI = Runs batted in

Player	G	AB	H	Avg.	HR	RBI
Manuel Lee	99	300	78	.260	3	34
Pat Borders	94	241	62	.257	3	29
Mookie Wilson	54	238	71	.298	2	17
Bob Brenly	48	88	15	.170	1	6
Jesse Barfield	21	80	16	.200	5	11
Rob Ducey	41	76	16	.211	0	7
Tom Lawless	59	70	16	.229	0	3
Lee Mazzilli	28	66	15	.227	4	11
Glenallen Hill	19	52	15	.288	1	7
Greg Myers	17	44	5	.114	0	1
Alexis Infante	20	12	2	.167	0	0
Francisco Cabrera	3	12	2	.167	0	0
Ozzie Virgil	9	11	2	.182	1	2
Kevin Batiste	6	8	2	.250	0	0
John Olerud	6	8	3	.375	0	0

=== Pitching ===
==== Starting pitchers ====
Note: G = Games pitched; IP = Innings pitched; W = Wins; L = Losses; ERA = Earned run average; SO = Strikeouts

Player	G	IP	W	L	ERA	SO
Jimmy Key	33	216.0	13	14	3.88	118
Dave Stieb	33	206.2	17	8	3.35	101
John Cerutti	33	205.1	11	11	3.07	69
Mike Flanagan	30	171.2	8	10	3.93	47
Todd Stottlemyre	27	127.2	7	7	3.88	63
Al Leiter	1	6.2	0	0	4.05	4

==== Other pitchers ====
Note: G = Games pitched; IP = Innings pitched; W = Wins; L = Losses; ERA = Earned run average; SO = Strikeouts

Player	G	IP	W	L	ERA	SO
Frank Wills	24	71.1	1	0	3.66	41
Mauro Gozzo	9	31.2	4	1	4.83	10
Steve Cummings	5	21.0	2	0	3.00	8
Alex Sanchez	4	11.2	0	1	10.03	4
Jeff Musselman	5	11.0	0	1	10.64	3
José Núñez	6	10.2	0	0	2.53	14

==== Relief pitchers ====
Note: G = Games pitched; W = Wins; L = Losses; SV = Saves; ERA = Earned run average; SO = Strikeouts

Player	G	W	L	SV	ERA	SO
Tom Henke	64	8	3	20	1.92	116
Duane Ward	66	4	10	15	3.77	122
David Wells	54	7	4	2	2.40	78
Tony Castillo	17	1	1	1	6.11	10
Jim Acker	14	2	1	0	1.59	24
Xavier Hernandez	7	1	0	0	4.76	7
DeWayne Buice	7	1	0	0	5.82	10

== ALCS ==
=== Game 1 ===
October 3, 1989, at Oakland–Alameda County Coliseum

Team	1	2	3	4	5	6	7	8	9	R	H	E
Toronto	0	2	0	1	0	0	0	0	0	3	5	1
Oakland	0	1	0	0	1	3	0	2	X	7	11	0
W: Dave Stewart (1–0) L: Dave Stieb (0–1)
HR: TOR – Ernie Whitt (1) OAK – Dave Henderson (1), Mark McGwire (1)

=== Game 2 ===
October 4, 1989, at Oakland–Alameda County Coliseum

Team	1	2	3	4	5	6	7	8	9	R	H	E
Toronto	0	0	1	0	0	0	0	2	0	3	5	1
Oakland	0	0	0	2	0	3	1	0	X	6	9	1
W: Mike Moore (1–0) L: Todd Stottlemyre (0–1) S: Dennis Eckersley (1)
HR: OAK – Dave Parker (1)

=== Game 3 ===
October 6, 1989, at SkyDome

Team	1	2	3	4	5	6	7	8	9	R	H	E
Oakland	1	0	1	1	0	0	0	0	0	3	8	1
Toronto	0	0	0	4	0	0	3	0	X	7	8	0
W: Jimmy Key (1–0) L: Storm Davis (0–1)
HR: OAK – Dave Parker (2)

=== Game 4 ===
October 7, 1989, at SkyDome

Team	1	2	3	4	5	6	7	8	9	R	H	E
Oakland	0	0	3	0	2	0	1	0	0	6	11	1
Toronto	0	0	0	1	0	1	1	2	0	5	13	0
W: Bob Welch (1–0) L: Mike Flanagan (0–1) S: Dennis Eckersley (2)
HR: OAK – Rickey Henderson 2 (2), José Canseco (1)

=== Game 5 ===
October 8, 1989, at SkyDome

Team	1	2	3	4	5	6	7	8	9	R	H	E
Oakland	1	0	1	0	0	0	2	0	0	4	4	0
Toronto	0	0	0	0	0	0	0	1	2	3	9	0
W: Dave Stewart (2–0) L: Dave Stieb (0–2) S: Dennis Eckersley (3)
HR: TOR – Lloyd Moseby (1), George Bell (1)

== Award winners ==
- George Bell, Player of the Month Award, August
- Tony Fernández, Gold Glove Award
- Fred McGriff, Player of the Month Award, April
- Fred McGriff, American League Leader in Home Runs (36)
- Fred McGriff, Silver Slugger Award

All-Star Game

- Kelly Gruber, third base
- Tony Fernandez, shortstop

== Farm system ==
Level	Team	League	Manager
AAA	Syracuse Chiefs	International League	Bob Bailor
AA	Knoxville Blue Jays	Southern League	Barry Foote
A	Dunedin Blue Jays	Florida State League	Doug Ault
A	Myrtle Beach Blue Jays	South Atlantic League	Mike Fischlin
A-Short Season	St. Catharines Blue Jays	New York–Penn League	Bob Shirley
Rookie	Medicine Hat Blue Jays	Pioneer League	Rocket Wheeler
