= 1985 American League Championship Series =

17th edition of Major League Baseball's American League Championship Series

Team (Wins)	Managers	Season
Kansas City Royals (4)	Dick Howser	91–71, .562, GA: 1
Toronto Blue Jays (3)	Bobby Cox	99–62, .615, GA: 2
- Dates: October 8–16
- MVP: George Brett (Kansas City)
- Umpires: Dave Phillips (crew chief); Dale Ford; Jim Evans; Ted Hendry; Vic Voltaggio; Derryl Cousins

Broadcast
- Television: NBC
- TV announcers: Bob Costas and Tony Kubek
- Radio: CBS; WIBW (KC); CJCL (TOR)
- Radio announcers: Ernie Harwell and Curt Gowdy (CBS); Denny Matthews and Fred White (WIBW); Tom Cheek and Jerry Howarth (CJCL)

The 1985 American League Championship Series was played between the Kansas City Royals and the Toronto Blue Jays from October 8 to 16. Major League Baseball decided to extend the Championship Series in both leagues from its best-of-five (1969–1984) to the current best-of-seven format starting with this year, and it proved pivotal in the outcome of the ALCS. The Blue Jays seemingly put a stranglehold on the Series, earning a three games to one lead over the Royals after four games. However, Kansas City staged an improbable comeback, winning the next three games to win the American League Championship Series four games to three. The Royals would proceed to defeat their cross-state rivals, the St. Louis Cardinals, in the World Series four games to three.

== Background ==
The Royals had long been a contending team in the American League, with great regular season success but frustration in the playoffs. They won three consecutive American League West division titles from 1976 to 1978, only to be defeated in the ALCS all three years by the New York Yankees. The Royals did manage to defeat the Yankees and win the ALCS in 1980; however, they lost the World Series to the Philadelphia Phillies four games to two. In 1984, Kansas City again won the West Division, but were swept in the ALCS by the eventual World Series champion Detroit Tigers, who won 20 more games during the regular season than the Royals. 1985 saw the Royals post a record of 91–71 (.562) winning another West Division pennant, ahead of the California Angels by a game.

By contrast, the Blue Jays franchise was established in 1977, and the late 1970s and early 1980s for them were marked by the challenges faced by an expansion team. Beginning in 1982, however, they played increasingly solid seasons, achieving their first winning season in 1983 and finishing second in the American League East in 1984 behind Detroit. 1985 proved to be a breakout year for Toronto, as they rode strong offense and pitching to the second-best record in Major League Baseball, at 99–62 (.615), winning the AL East by two games over the Yankees.

The playoff format was changed prior to this season to give the participating team with the better regular season record home field advantage for the ALCS. As a result, the Eastern division champion had the home-field advantage for the second consecutive year. From 1969–84 in the ALCS, the Western division champion automatically had home-field advantage in odd-numbered years and the Eastern division champion had it in even-numbered years.

== Summary ==
=== Toronto Blue Jays vs. Kansas City Royals ===
Kansas City won the series, 4–3.

Game	Date	Score	Location	Time	Attendance
1	October 8	Kansas City Royals – 1, Toronto Blue Jays – 6	Exhibition Stadium	2:24	39,115
2	October 9	Kansas City Royals – 5, Toronto Blue Jays – 6 (10)	Exhibition Stadium	3:39	34,029
3	October 11	Toronto Blue Jays – 5, Kansas City Royals – 6	Royals Stadium	2:51	40,224
4	October 12	Toronto Blue Jays – 3, Kansas City Royals – 1	Royals Stadium	3:02	41,112
5	October 13	Toronto Blue Jays – 0, Kansas City Royals – 2	Royals Stadium	2:21	40,046
6	October 15	Kansas City Royals – 5, Toronto Blue Jays – 3	Exhibition Stadium	3:12	37,557
7	October 16	Kansas City Royals – 6, Toronto Blue Jays – 2	Exhibition Stadium	2:49	32,084

== Game summaries ==
=== Game 1 ===
Tuesday, October 8, 1985 8:30 pm (ET) at Exhibition Stadium in Toronto, Ontario 63 °F (17 °C), Overcast
Team	1	2	3	4	5	6	7	8	9	R	H	E
Kansas City	0	0	0	0	0	0	0	0	1	1	5	1
Toronto	0	2	3	1	0	0	0	0	X	6	11	0
WP: Dave Stieb (1–0) LP: Charlie Leibrandt (0–1)

The Toronto Blue Jays entered the series as the favorite to win the series. The first game featured Toronto pitcher Dave Stieb and Kansas City pitcher Charlie Leibrandt at Exhibition Stadium in Toronto. Neither team was able to score runs in the first inning; however, in the second inning the Blue Jays offense became productive. Jesse Barfield singled and advanced to second base when Willie Upshaw was hit by a pitch. Garth Iorg forced Barfield out at third, but with Iorg on first and Upshaw on second, Ernie Whitt singled to score Upshaw with the first run of the series. Tony Fernández singled to shortstop allowing Iorg to score, and a single by Damaso Garcia loaded the bases with one out. Leibrandt induced a pop fly out by Lloyd Moseby and a ground ball out by George Bell.

After nearly breaking the game open in the second inning, the Blue Jays increased their lead in the third inning and Leibrandt was removed from the game. A double by Cliff Johnson was followed by a base on balls to Barfield. Upshaw's single loaded the bases with no outs and led to relief pitcher Steve Farr entering the game. Rance Mulliniks singled to score Johnson and keep the bases loaded. A walk to Whitt scored Barfield to increase the score to 4–0. A sacrifice fly from Fernandez made it 5–0. Farr finally settled down and proceeded to get next two batters out; however, the Royals were down 5–0 en route to a 6–1 loss. The final Blue Jays' run was scored when George Bell singled and scored on a throwing error by Steve Balboni on a fielder's choice to the next batter, Cliff Johnson.

Willie Wilson scored the Royals' only run in the ninth inning when he singled, moved to third on a George Brett single, and scored on a fielders choice ground out by Pat Sheridan. The Blue Jays scored six runs and left nine runners on base. Leibrandt was credited with the loss while Stieb pitched eight innings for the win and Tom Henke pitched the ninth inning.

The victory gave the Blue Jays a one-game to none lead in the ALCS.

=== Game 2 ===
Wednesday, October 9, 1985 3:05 pm (ET) at Exhibition Stadium in Toronto, Ontario 69 °F (21 °C), Overcast
Team	1	2	3	4	5	6	7	8	9	10	R	H	E
Kansas City	0	0	2	1	0	0	0	0	1	1	5	10	3
Toronto	0	0	0	1	0	2	0	1	0	2	6	10	0
WP: Tom Henke (1–0) LP: Dan Quisenberry (0–1); Home runs: KC: Willie Wilson (1), Pat Sheridan (1); TOR: None

Game 2 produced excitement and controversy with the Blue Jays winning, 6–5, in ten innings. This game featured Royals' pitcher Bud Black against Toronto left-hander Jimmy Key. The Royals scored in the third inning when Buddy Biancalana singled and scored on an unexpected home run by the light-hitting Willie Wilson to make the score 2–0. They increased their lead in the fourth inning when Darryl Motley walked and scored on a double by Jim Sundberg. The Jays, trailing the game 3–0, got on the scoreboard in the bottom of the fourth inning when George Bell reached base on an error by George Brett and scored a run on Cliff Johnson's double to decrease the gap to 3–1.

As in Game 1, rain interrupted the game with the Blue Jays at bat. In the sixth inning, with two outs and the Royals leading the game 3–1, Black hit Bell with a pitch, then Cliff Johnson singled to left field to put runners at first and second. Black threw a wild pitch, allowing the runners to advance. Blue Jays manager Bobby Cox pulled Johnson and sent in pinch-runner Lou Thornton. This change was successful when Barfield singled up the middle to score both runners and tie the game at three runs apiece. Black retired Upshaw to end the inning.

In the bottom of the eighth inning, Royals manager Dick Howser went to closer Dan Quisenberry. With one out, Lloyd Moseby singled, stole second base, and advanced to third on a throwing error by catcher Jim Sundberg. When Moseby then scored on George Bell's sacrifice fly, the Blue Jays were only three outs from a 2–0 series lead. Kansas City, however, would not go quietly. Leading off the ninth inning, reserve outfielder Pat Sheridan pinch-hit for Motley and drilled a game-tying home run off Tom Henke. Neither team scored over the rest of the ninth, and the game went into extra innings.

In the top of the tenth, Willie Wilson hit a lead-off single and stole second with two outs. Frank White then hit a low line drive on which center fielder Lloyd Moseby seemed to make a shoe-string catch. Replays showed that he may have made the play, but both Kubek and Costas agreed that it was very difficult to decide, even after watching it numerous times in slow motion. The play was ruled no catch, and White was credited with an RBI single. The Blue Jays then came to bat with a controversial one-run Kansas City lead.

The Blue Jays responded in their half of the tenth inning with an infield single by Tony Fernández. Fernandez moved to second on Damaso Garcia's ground out and scored on Moseby's single, with Fernández running through third base coach Jimy Williams' stop sign. Quisenberry then tried to pick off Moseby, but Steve Balboni misplayed the throw to first base and Moseby advanced to second on the error. Al Oliver's two out single brought Moseby home with the winning run and the Blue Jays headed to Kansas City with a two games to none series lead. Each closer was involved in the decision as Henke was credited the win and Quisenberry assigned the loss.

=== Game 3 ===
Friday, October 11, 1985 7:15 pm (CT) at Royals Stadium in Kansas City, Missouri 55 °F (13 °C), Showers
Team	1	2	3	4	5	6	7	8	9	R	H	E
Toronto	0	0	0	0	5	0	0	0	0	5	13	1
Kansas City	1	0	0	1	1	2	0	1	X	6	10	1
WP: Steve Farr (1–0) LP: Jim Clancy (0–1); Home runs: TOR: Jesse Barfield (1), Rance Mulliniks (1); KC: George Brett 2 (2), Jim Sundberg (1)

In past years, a 2–0 hole would mean a must-win game, but the Royals entered Game 3 not having to win to keep playing, but only to keep the series close. They sent the eventual 1985 Cy Young Award winner Bret Saberhagen to the mound against Doyle Alexander for the Blue Jays. Entering the contest, Dick Howser had an all-time postseason managerial record of 0–11. As it turned out, George Brett's one-man show put the Royals back into the series.

With two outs in the first, Brett unloaded a home run to give the Royals a 1–0 lead. The Blue Jays threatened in the third when Garcia doubled and reached third on Lonnie Smith's throwing error. Moseby grounded to Brett at third, who stunned everybody by gunning the ball home and getting Garcia to preserve the 1–0 Kansas City lead. In the fourth, Brett opened with a double, went to third on McRae's fly out to right, and scored on White's sacrifice fly to give the Royals a 2–0 lead.

But the Blue Jays fought back. In the fifth, Whitt singled and Barfield homered to tie the game at two. Garcia then doubled and scored when Moseby singled off of Saberhagen's leg. Rance Mulliniks then drilled a two-run homer and the Blue Jays were suddenly ahead 5–2 and 15 defensive outs from taking a 3–0 series lead. Bud Black succeeded Saberhagen and promptly loaded the bases on singles by Johnson and Bell and a walk to Whitt. With Barfield, who had already homered, at the plate, Howser sent for Steve Farr, who got the Royals out of the jam with a ground out.

The Royals fought back, getting a Jim Sundberg home run in the fifth to make it 5–3. In the sixth, Wilson singled and Brett hit his second homer of the night, tying the game at five. Dennis Lamp replaced Alexander and retired the Royals without any further damage. In the eighth, Brett singled, went to second on McRae's bunt, advanced to third on White's infield grounder, and scored on Balboni's bloop single—Balboni's first hit of the series—to give the Royals a 6–5 lead. Howser stuck with Farr who got through the ninth in order, with the last out coming on a foul pop by Lloyd Moseby, caught by Brett. With that, the Royals won, 6–5. Brett had arguably his best playoff performance ever, going 4 for 4 with a single, a double, two homers, three RBIs, four runs scored, and throwing out Garcia at the plate. The win narrowed the Blue Jays lead in the series to 2–1 entering Game 4 in Kansas City. It was Howser's first post-season win in 12 tries.

=== Game 4 ===
Saturday, October 12, 1985 7:15 pm (CT) at Royals Stadium in Kansas City, Missouri 64 °F (18 °C), Clear
Team	1	2	3	4	5	6	7	8	9	R	H	E
Toronto	0	0	0	0	0	0	0	0	3	3	7	0
Kansas City	0	0	0	0	0	1	0	0	0	1	2	0
WP: Tom Henke (2–0) LP: Charlie Leibrandt (0–2)

In Game 4, Toronto prevailed 3–1, making it the second game of the series in which the Blue Jays won after trailing going into their final at bat. This gave Toronto a 3–1 lead in the best-of-seven series, and put them one win away from becoming the first team outside the United States to represent their league in the World Series.

The fourth game was a rematch of the pitchers who had started Game 1, with Stieb taking on Leibrandt. Entering the bottom of the sixth, the Blue Jays had only two hits and the Royals only one. A walk to Lonnie Smith and a single to Willie Wilson put runners at first and third with nobody out and the hot-hitting George Brett at the plate. Showing great respect for Brett's dominance in the series, Toronto manager Bobby Cox opted to intentionally walk him, loading the bases with nobody out. Initially, the play seemed to backfire, as Stieb walked Hal McRae to give the Royals a 1–0 lead. Stieb got out of the inning by inducing a Sheridan pop out and a double play grounder from Frank White.

Entering the ninth, it appeared the bases-loaded walk to McRae was going to be the difference in the game. Leibrandt opened the ninth having surrendered only four hits. A walk to Damaso Garcia and a double by Moseby tied the game. Quisenberry entered the game and gave up a single to George Bell and a double to Al Oliver that scored Moseby and Bell, giving the Blue Jays a 3–1 lead. The Royals did get two on with two out in the ninth, but Henke got out of the jam and emerged as the winning pitcher for the second time in three games.

=== Game 5 ===
Sunday, October 13, 1985 3:35 pm (CT) at Royals Stadium in Kansas City, Missouri 67 °F (19 °C), Cloudy
Team	1	2	3	4	5	6	7	8	9	R	H	E
Toronto	0	0	0	0	0	0	0	0	0	0	8	0
Kansas City	1	1	0	0	0	0	0	0	X	2	8	0
WP: Danny Jackson (1–0) LP: Jimmy Key (0–1)

A well-rested Danny Jackson pitched for Kansas City trying to stave off elimination in the ALCS. The Blue Jays sent in their own well-rested starter, Jimmy Key, to pitch with the goal of playing in the World Series for the first time in franchise history.

In the bottom of the first inning, Lonnie Smith doubled, stole third, and scored on a ground out by George Brett. In the second inning, Frank White reached first on a bunt, advanced to third on a Balboni single, and scored on a sacrifice fly by Darryl Motley. That was more than enough for Danny Jackson, who pitched a complete-game eight-hit shutout.

The Blue Jays had numerous opportunities to score runs off Jackson but could not come through. They led off the fourth inning with back-to-back singles by George Bell and Cliff Johnson, but Lonnie Smith threw Bell out trying to go from first to third on Johnson's single. In the fifth, Toronto had runners on second and third with none out, but Jackson induced two groundouts and a pop out to end the inning. In the sixth inning, the Blue Jays loaded the bases with two outs, but Ernie Whitt grounded out to end the threat. Through the final three innings, no Toronto hitter was able to reach base. The victory cut the Blue Jays' series lead to 3–2, sending the series back to Canada for a sixth game.

=== Game 6 ===
Tuesday, October 15, 1985 8:15 pm (ET) at Exhibition Stadium in Toronto, Ontario 54 °F (12 °C), Clear
Team	1	2	3	4	5	6	7	8	9	R	H	E
Kansas City	1	0	1	0	1	2	0	0	0	5	8	1
Toronto	1	0	1	0	0	1	0	0	0	3	8	2
WP: Mark Gubicza (1–0) LP: Doyle Alexander (0–1) Sv: Dan Quisenberry (1); Home runs: KC: George Brett (3); TOR: None

A win for the Royals in the first ever LCS Game 6 would force the first ever Game 7 while a win for the Blue Jays would earn the franchise its first appearance in the World Series. Game 6 was the first series appearance for pitcher Mark Gubicza, who started for the Royals against Blue Jays pitcher Doyle Alexander, the Game 3 starter for Toronto.

In the top of the first inning, walks to Wilson and Brett allowed the Royals' Willie Wilson to score a run when Hal McRae singled. The Blue Jays tied the score in the bottom of the first inning when Garcia doubled, Moseby singled, and Garcia scored when Mulliniks grounded into a double play. In the top of the third inning, George Brett reached on a fielder's choice and scored on a double by Hal McRae. The Blue Jays responded when Fernandez doubled to left field and moved up to third base on a wild pitch by Gubicza. Fernandez then scored on Moseby's ground out to tie the score at 2–2.

In the fifth inning, Brett hit his third home run of the series—all of them against Blue Jays' pitcher Doyle Alexander—and the Royals led the game 3–2. In the sixth inning, Sundberg reached on a base on balls and advanced to second base on a sacrifice bunt. Sundberg subsequently scored on a double by Buddy Biancalana. Biancalana advanced to third on a throwing error and scored on Lonnie Smith's double. The Blue Jays scored one run when Moseby singled, advanced to second base with a base on balls to Upshaw. Moseby scored on Cliff Johnson's single to make the score 5–3, but the Royals held on and tied the series at three wins apiece.

=== Game 7 ===
Wednesday, October 16, 1985 8:15 pm (ET) at Exhibition Stadium in Toronto, Ontario 41 °F (5 °C), Partly cloudy
Team	1	2	3	4	5	6	7	8	9	R	H	E
Kansas City	0	1	0	1	0	4	0	0	0	6	8	0
Toronto	0	0	0	0	1	0	0	0	1	2	8	1
WP: Charlie Leibrandt (1–2) LP: Dave Stieb (1–1); Home runs: KC: Pat Sheridan (2); TOR: None

Earlier in the day, Jack Clark put the St. Louis Cardinals into the World Series with a three-run home run off the Dodgers' reliever Tom Niedenfuer. The American League opponent would be the winner of this ALCS Game 7, promising an intriguing match-up for the World Championship: either an I-70 Series between Missouri's two major league teams, or the first appearance of a franchise from outside the United States. The Blue Jays sent Dave Stieb to the mound for the third time in the series, as the Blue Jays had won both of his previous starts. The Royals countered with Bret Saberhagen, who was pitching for the first time since his injury in Game 3. Entering Game 7, 10 of the 12 Blue Jays-Royals games were decided by two runs or fewer.

Up to this point, the Royals had scored the first run in every game except Game 1. This trend continued when Pat Sheridan reached on a bunt, advanced to second base on a fielder's choice by Balboni, and scored on a single by Jim Sundberg. In the bottom of the third inning, the Blue Jays hit Saberhagen with a batted ball (off of his pitching hand) for the second time in the series, with Mulliniks winding up at second base. Saberhagen continued in the inning and retired the side, but as he started to warm up for the following inning, his pitching hand seemed to be bothering him, and in an abundance of caution with the Royals not wanting to risk losing him for a potential World Series, he was removed from the game, and Leibrandt came on to pitch for the Royals.

In the fourth inning, Sheridan homered, giving the Royals a 2–0 lead. In the bottom of the fifth, the Blue Jays reduced the lead to one when Garcia singled and scored on Upshaw's double. With the score 2–1, the Royals came to bat in the sixth inning against a tiring Stieb. Wilson hit a fly ball out, Brett walked and McRae was hit by a pitch. Sheridan subsequently hit into a fielder's choice that forced Brett out at third base, putting runners at first and second with two outs. Stieb then walked Balboni to face the presumably lesser hitting threat, Jim Sundberg. Sundberg drilled a high drive toward right field that hit the top of the fence and bounced high in the air, landing in play next to Jesse Barfield. All three runners, running on contact with two outs, scored easily and Sundberg stood at third base with a three-run triple, giving the Royals a 5–1 lead. Blue Jays relief pitcher Jim Acker entered for Stieb and gave up a base hit single to Frank White that allowed Sundberg to score, increasing the lead to 6–1.

Leibrandt was still on the mound to start the ninth inning. With one out, he gave up a single to Barfield and a double to Fernandez. Quisenberry made his third appearance of the series, and a chance to send the Royals to the World Series. He allowed one of the inherited runners to score on a ground out and closed out the game, giving the Royals a 6–2 win in Game 7. They became the first team to overcome a 3–1 deficit in the LCS. Kansas City Royals' George Brett was 8 for 23 with two doubles, three home runs, five RBIs, seven walks, and a .348 batting average. Brett was named the series MVP, having played a role in 11 of Kansas City's 26 runs, scoring six and driving in five.

This would be the last postseason game played at Exhibition Stadium; the next postseason appearance for the Blue Jays would come in 1989, their first season in the then-new SkyDome. It was the first and only Game 7 played by the Blue Jays until 2025.

== Composite box ==
1985 ALCS (4–3): Kansas City Royals over Toronto Blue Jays

Team	1	2	3	4	5	6	7	8	9	10	R	H	E
Kansas City Royals	3	2	3	3	2	9	0	1	2	1	26	51	6
Toronto Blue Jays	1	2	4	2	6	3	0	1	4	2	25	65	4
Total attendance: 264,167 Average attendance: 37,738

== Aftermath ==
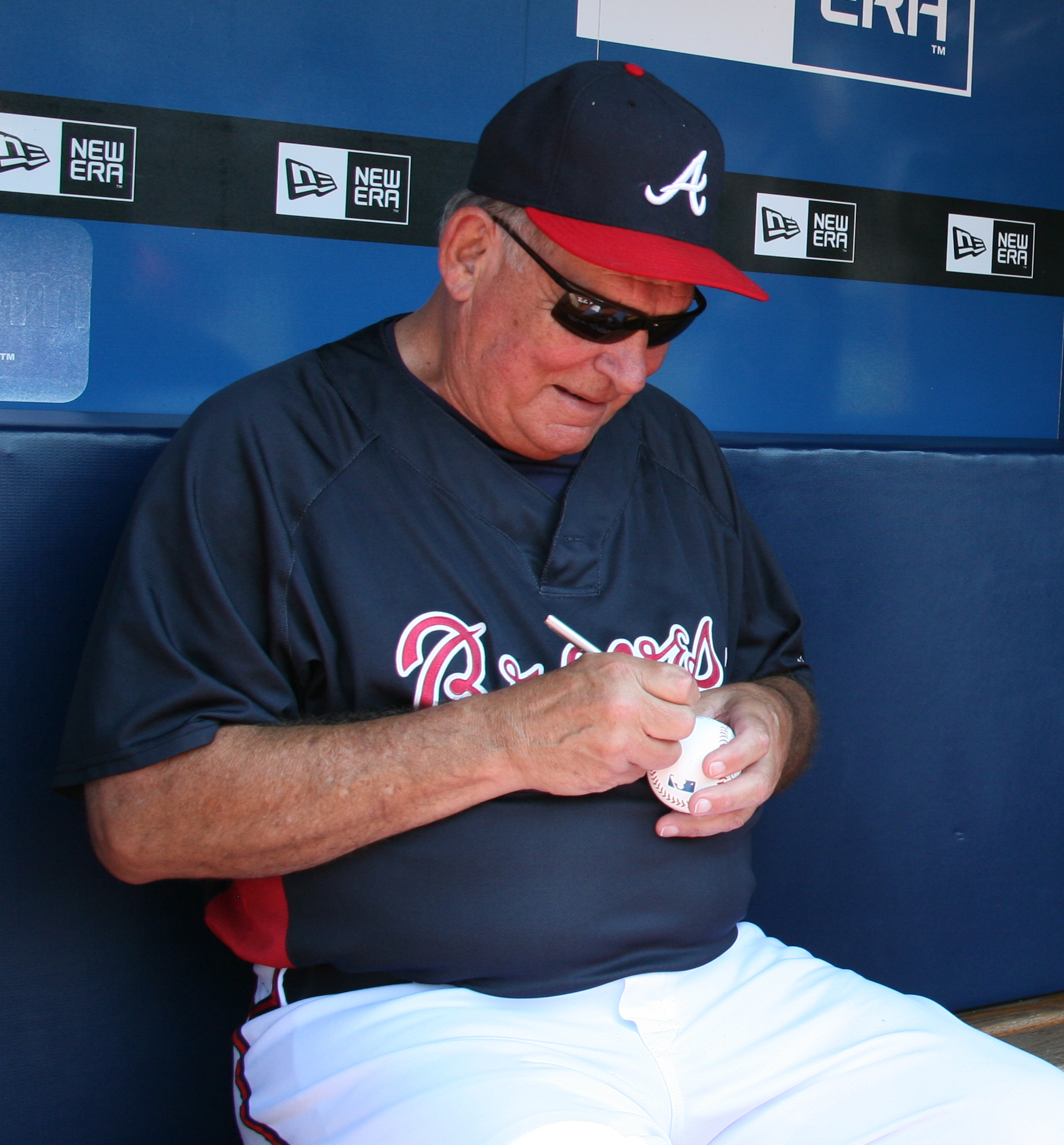
Bobby Cox (pictured in 2009) managed the Blue Jays until the end of the 1985 ALCS. He then left to serve as general manager of the Atlanta Braves and eventually brought himself to serve as manager in 1990; two years later, his Braves met the Blue Jays in the World Series.

The seventh game of the series was the end of the line for Blue Jays' manager Bobby Cox. Six days after the game ended, he left the organization to become the general manager of the Atlanta Braves.

The Royals went on to win the 1985 World Series against the St. Louis Cardinals by again coming back from a 3–1 series deficit to take the title in seven games. 1985 would be the last ALCS for Kansas City for 30 years. To date, no team has come back from a 3–1 series deficit twice in the postseason.

With their ALCS and World Series victories, the Royals would seemingly pass their previous October misfortunes onto the Blue Jays, as 1985 was the start of a heartbreaking stretch for Toronto. In 1987, the Blue Jays had been in first place by 3½ games over the Detroit Tigers with a week left to play, but they dropped their next seven games in a row, capped off by a sweep at the hands of the second-place Tigers at Tiger Stadium on the last weekend of the season, and lost the division by two games. In 1988, the Jays mounted a 22–7 run in September and October, but again fell two games short of the division title, won by the Boston Red Sox. In 1990, their first full season in the SkyDome, the Blue Jays led the division by 1½ games over the Red Sox with one week left in the season. However, they then proceeded to drop six of their last eight games, losing the division title to the Red Sox by a two-game margin, the third time in four seasons they finished two games back. Toronto won the American League East in 1989 and 1991, but were quickly eliminated by Oakland (1989) and Minnesota (1991) in the ALCS, with both teams going on to win the World Series. Toronto would not break through for a World Series berth until 1992, when the team defeated former manager Bobby Cox and the Atlanta Braves in the World Series. They won again in 1993, becoming the first champions to repeat since the 1977–1978 New York Yankees.

The two teams met again in the 2015 ALCS, with the Royals holding home-field advantage that time. In a reverse of the 1985 series, the Royals took a 3–1 lead, winning games 1, 2, and 4. There would be no series comeback, however, as the Royals won in a decisive sixth game on their way to a second World Series title.

While both NLCS and ALCS had teams comeback from a 2-0 deficit in the first year of the expanded seven game series format in 1985, it would become increasingly more rare in the subsequent years afterwards. In the American League, it has only happened twice under the seven game format. In the 2004 ALCS, the Red Sox came back from a 3–0 series deficit against the Yankees, also becoming the first team in MLB history to accomplish this feat. Later, the 2025 Blue Jays, came back after losing the first two home games in the ALCS against the Mariners, to defeat them in seven games.
