= 1989 American League Championship Series =

21st edition of Major League Baseball's American League Championship Series

Team (Wins)	Managers	Season
Oakland Athletics (4)	Tony La Russa	99–63, .611, GA: 7
Toronto Blue Jays (1)	Cito Gaston	89–73, .549, GA: 2
- Dates: October 3–8
- MVP: Rickey Henderson (Oakland)
- Umpires: Dave Phillips (crew chief); Dan Morrison; Dale Ford; Derryl Cousins; Rick Reed; Steve Palermo

Broadcast
- Television: NBC
- TV announcers: Bob Costas and Tony Kubek
- Radio: CBS
- Radio announcers: Brent Musburger and Johnny Bench

The 1989 American League Championship Series was a best-of-seven semifinal series in Major League Baseball’s 1989 postseason played between the Oakland Athletics and the Toronto Blue Jays from October 3 to 8. A dominant Oakland team took the Series four games to one, en route to a sweep of their cross-bay rivals, the San Francisco Giants, in a World Series marred by the destructive Loma Prieta earthquake.

== Background ==
The Athletics finished the 1989 regular season as the best overall team in baseball, with a 99–63 record (.611). They easily won the American League West division title by seven games over the Kansas City Royals. The Blue Jays finished the 1989 regular season with an 89–73 record (.549). However, their winning of the American League East division title was by a much narrower margin: only two games over the Baltimore Orioles.

== Summary ==
The ALCS began with Games 1 and 2 being played at the Oakland–Alameda County Coliseum, with the Athletics winning both. The Series then shifted to the SkyDome in Toronto, where the Blue Jays managed a win in Game 3 before losing Games 4 and 5 to Oakland. Athletics ace Dave Stewart earned two wins (in Games 1 and 5), while closer Dennis Eckersley saved three games (Games 2, 4, and 5) to send Oakland to the World Series.

Athletics left fielder Rickey Henderson was named the ALCS MVP. During the Series, Henderson had doubled, tripled, hit two home runs (in Game 4), and drove in 5 runs.

=== Oakland Athletics vs. Toronto Blue Jays ===
Oakland won the series, 4–1.

Game	Date	Score	Location	Time	Attendance
1	October 3	Toronto Blue Jays – 3, Oakland Athletics – 7	Oakland–Alameda County Coliseum	2:52	49,435
2	October 4	Toronto Blue Jays – 3, Oakland Athletics – 6	Oakland–Alameda County Coliseum	3:20	49,444
3	October 6	Oakland Athletics – 3, Toronto Blue Jays – 7	SkyDome	2:54	50,268
4	October 7	Oakland Athletics – 6, Toronto Blue Jays – 5	SkyDome	3:29	50,076
5	October 8	Oakland Athletics – 4, Toronto Blue Jays – 3	SkyDome	2:52	50,024

== Game summaries ==
=== Game 1 ===
Tuesday, October 3, 1989, at Oakland–Alameda County Coliseum in Oakland, California

Team	1	2	3	4	5	6	7	8	9	R	H	E
Toronto	0	2	0	1	0	0	0	0	0	3	5	1
Oakland	0	1	0	0	1	3	0	2	X	7	11	0
WP: Dave Stewart (1–0) LP: Dave Stieb (0–1); Home runs: TOR: Ernie Whitt (1); OAK: Dave Henderson (1), Mark McGwire (1)

The Athletics went off as heavy favorites largely due to their status as defending American League champions. The Blue Jays had been in second place much of the year before catching and passing the Baltimore Orioles on the final weekend of the season. Both teams threw their aces against each other, as Dave Stewart, the 20-game winner, took the mound for Oakland against Dave Stieb for Toronto.

In the bottom of the first inning, Rickey Henderson set the tone by walking and stealing second. Although he was stranded at third, it was a mere prelude of what was to come. In the top of the second inning, George Bell singled and went to third on a single by Tony Fernández. Fernandez stole second, and Bell scored on a sacrifice fly by Ernie Whitt. Nelson Liriano then singled home Fernandez to give the Blue Jays a 2–0 lead. In the bottom half of the inning, Dave Henderson homered to cut the lead in half, but in the top of the fourth, Whitt drove in his second run of the game with a homer that gave the Blue Jays a 3–1 lead. In the fifth, Carney Lansford singled and stole second on a José Canseco strikeout. He came home on Dave Parker's single to make it 3–2. The game then turned in the bottom of the sixth.

Mark McGwire tied the game with a homer to lead off the bottom of the sixth. Then, after Tony Phillips reached with one out, Blue Jays manager Cito Gaston pulled Stieb and replaced him with the recently acquired Jim Acker. Phillips stole second and stayed on an infield single by Mike Gallego, and Acker then hit Rickey Henderson with a pitch to load the bases with one out. Needing a double play to get out of the inning, Acker did his job by inducing Carney Lansford to ground to Fernandez. He got the first out by firing to Liriano at second, but Rickey Henderson upended Liriano, who threw the ball into the stands, scoring both Phillips and Gallego to give the Athletics their first lead of the game, 5–3.

It stayed that way until the bottom of the eighth, when Blue Jays reliever Duane Ward replaced Acker. After striking out Terry Steinbach, Ward walked Phillips. Gallego hit a double in the gap, but a perfect relay nailed Phillips at the plate for the second out while Gallego moved to third. Rickey Henderson then walked and stole second, and Gallego scored on a wild pitch by Ward. On the wild pitch, Henderson moved to third and subsequently scored on Lansford's single. The game was now out of reach, 7–3, as the Athletics prevailed to take Game 1. Henderson walked twice and reached as a hit batsman, stole two bases, and scored a run. Stewart got the win while Stieb was saddled with the loss.

=== Game 2 ===
Wednesday, October 4, 1989, at Oakland–Alameda County Coliseum in Oakland, California

Team	1	2	3	4	5	6	7	8	9	R	H	E
Toronto	0	0	1	0	0	0	0	2	0	3	5	1
Oakland	0	0	0	2	0	3	1	0	X	6	9	1
WP: Mike Moore (1–0) LP: Todd Stottlemyre (0–1) Sv: Dennis Eckersley (1); Home runs: TOR: None; OAK: Dave Parker (1)

Game 2 saw the Athletics throw their number two starter, Mike Moore, against the Blue Jays' Todd Stottlemyre. All was quiet until the top of the third when the Blue Jays' Lloyd Moseby scored after singling, moving to second on a single and third on an error and coming home on a fielder's choice ground out to make it 1–0. The Athletics captured the lead in the bottom of the fourth with the 'Rickey Rally,' a familiar run-scoring method of bygone years. Rickey Henderson singled, stole second and then third, and came home on Carney Lansford's single to tie the game. Lansford then scored on Mark McGwire's double to give the Athletics a 2–1 lead. The game stayed close until the sixth.

In the bottom of the sixth, Dave Parker led off with a home run. After McGwire singled, Cito Gaston pulled Stottlemyre in favor of Jim Acker. Acker then gave up a double to Dave Henderson and a single to Tony Phillips that scored two more runs and made it a 5–1 Oakland lead. Gaston pulled Acker and replaced him with David Wells, who got the final two outs of the inning, but the game was for all intents and purposes over.

Another 'Rickey Rally' ensued in the seventh when Henderson walked, stole second, stole third, and scored on an error by Fred McGriff. In doing this, Henderson became the first player ever to steal four bases in a postseason game. The steal of third elicited a reaction from Blue Jays third baseman Kelly Gruber when Henderson walked the last several steps to the base because the catcher didn't throw. Gruber accused Henderson of showing up the Blue Jays in the post-game interview. Henderson's run made it 6–1 Oakland.

The Blue Jays put together a mini-rally in the eighth when they loaded the bases against Rick Honeycutt with nobody out and A.L. home run champion Fred McGriff at the plate. The Athletics countered by bringing in Dennis Eckersley, who minimized the damage by yielding a one-run single to McGriff and then giving up another run on a double play. Eckersley retired the Blue Jays in order in the ninth, and the Athletics won 6–3 to go up two games to none in the series. Moore was the winning pitcher, Stottlemyre the loser, and Eckersley got his fifth save in his last five chances in the ALCS dating back to 1988.

=== Game 3 ===
Friday, October 6, 1989, at SkyDome in Toronto

Team	1	2	3	4	5	6	7	8	9	R	H	E
Oakland	1	0	1	1	0	0	0	0	0	3	8	1
Toronto	0	0	0	4	0	0	3	0	X	7	8	0
WP: Jimmy Key (1–0) LP: Storm Davis (0–1); Home runs: OAK: Dave Parker (2); TOR: None

The two teams arrived in Canada for the first-ever post-season game in the new Toronto SkyDome. The Athletics were looking to take a commanding 3–0 series lead while the Blue Jays needed a win to get back into the series. The game pitted Storm Davis against Blue Jays starter Jimmy Key. As was the case in the first two games, the team that scored first lost.

The Athletics scored in the top of the first without benefit of a hit. Key walked both Rickey Henderson and Carney Lansford. Henderson moved up on Canseco's fly out and scored on McGwire's sacrifice fly to give the Athletics a 1–0 lead. In the third, Henderson continued his series dominance by doubling, stealing third (his seventh steal of the series in just 21 innings), and scoring on a Lansford single to give the Athletics a 2–0 lead. When Dave Parker homered in the fourth, the Athletics had a 3–0 lead to go with their series momentum.

But the Blue Jays responded in the bottom of the fourth. They loaded the bases on a walk to Moseby and singles by Mookie Wilson and Fred McGriff. George Bell hit a sacrifice fly to center to score Moseby and cut the lead to 3–1. Tony Fernández then doubled to right, sending Wilson and McGriff home with the tying runs. Fernandez also moved to third when Canseco misplayed the ball in right field. When Ernie Whitt singled, Fernandez scored to give the Jays the lead and bring the crowd back into the game cheering wildly.

The score stayed 4–3 until the bottom of the seventh. With one out and runners at first and third, Tony La Russa pulled Davis and inserted Rick Honeycutt. Honeycutt's relief appearance in Game 2 had been disastrous; this time, it was worse and cost the Athletics any chance to win. Honeycutt gave up singles to two light-hitting Blue Jays, Manuel Lee and Junior Felix, scoring Tony Fernández and loading the bases with only one out. A walk to Lloyd Moseby forced in another run giving the Blue Jays a 6–3 lead. Of the last six hitters Honeycutt had faced in the two games he had walked three and given up three hits and three had scored. Gene Nelson relieved Honeycutt and gave up a single to right by Wilson that scored Lee, but a great throw from Canseco nailed Felix at the plate. Nevertheless, the Blue Jays now had a 7–3 lead with two innings to play.

In the last two innings, Acker and closer Tom Henke only faced seven batters, getting six outs and giving up a walk to McGwire. The last out was, appropriately enough, Rickey Henderson, who grounded out to Fernandez to end the game. The win by the Blue Jays was their first post-season win since Game 4 of the 1985 ALCS. Prior to this game, they had lost their previous five contests in LCS play. Key was the winning pitcher while Storm Davis was the loser. The result cut the Athletics' series lead to two games to one in the best-of-seven series.

=== Game 4 ===
Saturday, October 7, 1989, at SkyDome in Toronto

Team	1	2	3	4	5	6	7	8	9	R	H	E
Oakland	0	0	3	0	2	0	1	0	0	6	11	1
Toronto	0	0	0	1	0	1	1	2	0	5	13	0
WP: Bob Welch (1–0) LP: Mike Flanagan (0–1) Sv: Dennis Eckersley (2); Home runs: OAK: Rickey Henderson 2 (2), José Canseco (1); TOR: None

Game 4 was a critical game for both teams. Toronto could guarantee a return of the series to Oakland with a win while the Athletics would gain a significant lead of three games to one if they prevailed. The match-up featured a former Cy Young winner, Mike Flanagan (1979) against a future one (1990), Bob Welch.

The game was scoreless until the third when Walt Weiss doubled and stole third. Rickey Henderson, who was 3 for 8 with four walks, five runs scored, and seven stolen bases, drilled a two-run homer to give the Athletics a 2–0 lead. After Flanagan retired Dave Henderson, José Canseco secured the most memorable moment of the series by socking the first home run ever hit into the fifth-tier upper deck of the SkyDome. The Toronto crowd sat in stunned silence as Canseco circled the bases; the home run was measured at 480 feet (150 m). Canseco's home run gave the Athletics a 3–0 lead and also likely gave Toronto fans a measure of comfort, since the team scoring first had lost each of the first three games.

The Blue Jays got a run back in the fourth, but it was disappointing because they loaded the bases with nobody out and only scored once. In the top of the fifth, however, Rickey Henderson struck again with another two-run blast that increased the Athletics lead to 5–1. By this time Henderson was hitting .500 for the series with two homers to go along with his other accomplishments. The Blue Jays got a run back in the sixth when Gruber singled and scored on a double by Junior Felix. Tony La Russa gambled with Honeycutt, who had retired no batters out of the last six he had faced over two games. After walking Lloyd Moseby, Honeycutt induced a ground out that left the score 5–2 in favor of the Athletics.

The Athletics got another run in the seventh when Dave Henderson doubled and scored on José Canseco's single. The Blue Jays got that run back in the bottom of the inning when Tony Fernández doubled and scored on pinch-hitter Pat Borders' single. Rick Honeycutt ran into trouble in the eighth. Manny Lee singled and went to second on a ground out by Junior Felix. Honeycutt walked Moseby, bringing the tying run to the plate in the person of Mookie Wilson. With two on and one out, LaRussa summoned his closer, Dennis Eckersley. Eck induced a fielder's choice ground out by Wilson that scored Lee then faced 1989 home run champion Fred McGriff, who had not hit a homer in more than a month. McGriff won the battle, lining a single to center field that scored Wilson, but when Eckersley got George Bell to pop up for the third out, the Athletics still led by one with just an inning to play.

In the bottom of the ninth, Eckersley gave up a single to Kelly Gruber but otherwise retired the side, getting pinch-hitter Lee Mazzilli to pop out to end the game. Welch got the win and Eckersley the save while Flanagan was saddled with the loss. Despite a noble comeback effort, the Blue Jays now trailed three games to one and would need to win the final two games on the road in order to reach the Fall Classic.

=== Game 5 ===
Sunday, October 8, 1989, at SkyDome in Toronto

Team	1	2	3	4	5	6	7	8	9	R	H	E
Oakland	1	0	1	0	0	0	2	0	0	4	4	0
Toronto	0	0	0	0	0	0	0	1	2	3	9	0
WP: Dave Stewart (2–0) LP: Dave Stieb (0–2) Sv: Dennis Eckersley (3); Home runs: OAK: None; TOR: Lloyd Moseby (1), George Bell (1)

Game 5 was the mirror image of Game 4: an early Athletics lead and a Blue Jays comeback that fell just short of victory. The end result was a 4–3 win for the Athletics and a return trip to the Fall Classic to face their Bay Area neighbors, the San Francisco Giants. The game was also a rematch of Game 1 aces Dave Stewart for Oakland and Dave Stieb for Toronto.

Once again, it was Rickey Henderson creating havoc for the Blue Jays. Henderson again walked—his seventh of the Series—and again stole second—his eighth stolen base of the Series—and came home on Canseco's single to give the Athletics a 1–0 lead less than four minutes into the game. In the third, Henderson tripled to right, scoring Walt Weiss to give the Athletics a 2–0 lead. It stayed that way until the seventh when Stieb tired.

Dave Henderson walked and moved to third on a Mark McGwire single and scored on Terry Steinbach's single. Stieb got the hook and Jim Acker got out of the inning, but not before McGwire scored on a squeeze bunt by Mike Gallego. The Athletics now led 4–0 and Toronto had only nine outs left in their season.

The game tottered into the eighth before the Blue Jays finally scored on a home run by Lloyd Moseby. But entering the ninth, the Blue Jays needed three runs just to tie. George Bell led off with a home run that ended Stewart's bid for a complete game. Dennis Eckersley came on with a chance to earn his seventh save in the last nine ALCS games. And he got it although Tony Fernández scored a cosmetic run by singling, stealing second, moving to third on a fielder's choice and scoring on Gruber's sacrifice fly. With a 4–3 lead and two outs in the ninth, Eckersley struck out Junior Felix to finish the last American League baseball game of the 1980s.

== Composite box ==
1989 ALCS (4–1): Oakland Athletics over Toronto Blue Jays

Team	1	2	3	4	5	6	7	8	9	R	H	E
Oakland Athletics	2	1	5	3	3	6	4	2	0	26	43	3
Toronto Blue Jays	0	2	1	6	0	1	4	5	2	21	40	2
Total attendance: 249,247 Average attendance: 49,849

== Series overview and aftermath ==
Rickey Henderson was the unanimous choice for Most Valuable Player. He had six hits in 15 trips to the plate for a .400 batting average, including one double, one triple, two home runs, and eight runs scored. He drove in five runs, walked seven times, and stole eight bases. The only thing Henderson did wrong the entire series was commit an error in Game 4, and the recipient (George Bell) failed to score. But other Athletics put together tremendous performances as well. Henderson was later traded to Toronto in 1993 at the trade deadline, as he helped the Blue Jays win the 1993 World Series.

Dennis Eckersley saved three games in three opportunities while Dave Stewart gave up only five runs in 16 innings, going eight full innings in both appearances and gaining the win in both the opener and the closer. Mark McGwire hit .389 with a homer while Dave Parker hit a miserable .188, but two of his three hits were home runs that made the difference in the first two games.

One of the most uneven performances for the Athletics belonged to Rick Honeycutt, who could not retire any of the six batters he faced in Games 2 and 3, but who came through for the Athletics at a critical juncture in Game 4.

The one Blue Jay who had a very good series was Tony Fernández, who hit .350, scored six runs, and stole five bases in a losing cause.

In 1992, the Blue Jays beat the Athletics in the American League Championship Series, on the way to their first World Series in franchise history.
