= 1989 Major League Baseball postseason =

1989 Major League Baseball playoffs

Tournament details
- Dates: October 3–28, 1989
- Teams: 4

Final positions
- Champions: Oakland Athletics (9th title)
- Runners-up: San Francisco Giants

Tournament statistics
- Games played: 14
- Attendance: 736,707 (52,622 per game)
- Most HRs: Five tied (3)
- Most SBs: Rickey Henderson (OAK) (11)
- Best ERA: Mike Moore (OAK) (1.35)
- Most Ks (as pitcher): Dave Stewart (OAK) (23)

Awards
- MVP: Dave Stewart (OAK)

The 1989 Major League Baseball postseason was the playoff tournament of Major League Baseball for the 1989 season. The winners of each division advance to the postseason and face each other in a League Championship Series to determine the pennant winners that face each other in the World Series.

In the American League, the Oakland Athletics returned to the postseason for the second year in a row, and the Toronto Blue Jays returned for the second time in five years. The Blue Jays would return to the postseason in three of the next four seasons.

In the National League, the Chicago Cubs returned for the second time in six years, and the San Francisco Giants returned to the postseason for the second time in three years, marking the first time since 1971 that both teams from the San Francisco Bay Area made the postseason.

The playoffs began on October 3, 1989, and concluded on October 28, 1989, with the Athletics sweeping the Giants to win their first World Series title since 1974 and ninth overall. The series was impacted by the 1989 Loma Prieta earthquake which caused major damage to both Oakland and San Francisco, as well as Candlestick Park where Games 3 and 4 were played. This was the last championship the Athletics ever won during their time in Oakland.

== Teams ==
American League Teams National League Teams

The following teams qualified for the postseason:

=== American League ===
- Toronto Blue Jays – 89–73, AL East champions
- Oakland Athletics – 99–63, AL West champions

=== National League ===
- Chicago Cubs – 93–69, NL East champions
- San Francisco Giants – 92–70, NL West champions

== Playoff bracket ==
League Championship Series (ALCS, NLCS)
East	Toronto	1
West	Oakland	4
East	Chicago Cubs	1
West	San Francisco	4

World Series
AL	Oakland	4
NL	San Francisco	0

== American League Championship Series ==
=== Oakland Athletics vs. Toronto Blue Jays ===
Oakland won the series, 4–1.

Game	Date	Score	Location	Time	Attendance
1	October 3	Toronto Blue Jays – 3, Oakland Athletics – 7	Oakland–Alameda County Coliseum	2:52	49,435
2	October 4	Toronto Blue Jays – 3, Oakland Athletics – 6	Oakland–Alameda County Coliseum	3:20	49,444
3	October 6	Oakland Athletics – 3, Toronto Blue Jays – 7	SkyDome	2:54	50,268
4	October 7	Oakland Athletics – 6, Toronto Blue Jays – 5	SkyDome	3:29	50,076
5	October 8	Oakland Athletics – 4, Toronto Blue Jays – 3	SkyDome	2:52	50,024

This was the first postseason meeting between the Athletics and Blue Jays. The Athletics defeated the Blue Jays in five games to return to the World Series for the second consecutive year.

Dave Stewart pitched eight solid innings as the Athletics took Game 1. Mike Moore had a strong seven-inning performance on the mound in Game 2 as the Athletics won by three runs to take a 2–0 series lead headed to Toronto. In Game 3, the Athletics jumped out to a 3-0 lead in the top of the third, but the Blue Jays put up seven unanswered runs to get on the board in the series. Jose Canseco would ignite the Athletics’ offense in Game 4 as they prevailed in a slugfest to go up 3–1 in the series. In Game 5, Dennis Eckersley stopped a late rally by the Blue Jays as the Athletics narrowly prevailed to clinch the pennant.

The Athletics would win their next and most recent pennant the next year in a sweep over the Boston Red Sox, which would ultimately be their last during their time in Oakland, as the team would relocate to Las Vegas.

The Blue Jays returned to the ALCS in 1991, but would fall to the eventual World Series champion Minnesota Twins in five games. The Athletics and Blue Jays would meet again in the ALCS in 1992, where the Blue Jays defeated the Athletics in six games en route to their first World Series title.

== National League Championship Series ==
=== Chicago Cubs vs. San Francisco Giants ===
San Francisco won the series, 4–1.

Game	Date	Score	Location	Time	Attendance
1	October 4	San Francisco Giants – 11, Chicago Cubs – 3	Wrigley Field	2:51	39,195
2	October 5	San Francisco Giants – 5, Chicago Cubs – 9	Wrigley Field	3:08	39,195
3	October 7	Chicago Cubs – 4, San Francisco Giants – 5	Candlestick Park	2:48	62,065
4	October 8	Chicago Cubs – 4, San Francisco Giants – 6	Candlestick Park	3:13	62,078
5	October 9	Chicago Cubs – 2, San Francisco Giants – 3	Candlestick Park	2:47	62,084

This was the first postseason meeting between the Giants and Cubs. The Giants defeated the Cubs in five games to return to the World Series for the first time since 1962 (in the process denying a rematch of the 1929 World Series between the Cubs and Athletics).

Scott Garrelts pitched seven solid innings as the Giants blew out the Cubs in Game 1. In Game 2, the Cubs jumped out to a big lead early with six runs scored in the bottom of the first, and maintained it as they won 9–5 to even the series headed to San Francisco. In Game 3, the Giants won by one run as Robby Thompson hit a two-run home run in the bottom of the seventh to put the Giants ahead for good. The Giants would overcome an early Cubs lead to take Game 4, and Rick Reuschel pitched eight strong innings in Game 5 to help secure the pennant for San Francisco, setting up what would be the only all-Bay Area Fall Classic. This was the first playoff series won by the Giants since the 1954 World Series, when the team was still based in New York City.

The Giants would win their next pennant in 2002 over the St. Louis Cardinals in five games before also falling in the World Series that year.

This was the Cubs’ second consecutive NLCS defeat. They would return to the NLCS in 2003, but lost to the eventual World Series champion Florida Marlins in seven games after leading the series 3–1 and being five outs away from the pennant in Game 6. The Cubs would eventually win the pennant again in 2016 over the Los Angeles Dodgers in six games en route to a World Series title.

The Cubs and Giants would meet again in the NLDS in 2016, where the Cubs returned the favor and defeated the Giants in four games en route to a World Series title.

== 1989 World Series ==
=== Oakland Athletics (AL) vs. San Francisco Giants (NL) ===
Oakland won the series, 4–0.

Game	Date	Score	Location	Time	Attendance
1	October 14	San Francisco Giants – 0, Oakland Athletics – 5	Oakland–Alameda County Coliseum	2:45	49,385
2	October 15	San Francisco Giants – 1, Oakland Athletics – 5	Oakland–Alameda County Coliseum	2:47	49,388
3	October 27†	Oakland Athletics – 13, San Francisco Giants – 7	Candlestick Park	3:03	62,038
4	October 28	Oakland Athletics – 9, San Francisco Giants – 6	Candlestick Park	3:07	62,032

† Game 3 was originally slated for October 17 at 5:35 pm; however, it was postponed when an earthquake occurred at 5:04 pm.

This was the third all-California World Series, the first World Series to be played in the same city or metropolitan area since 1956, and the only one to feature two teams from the San Francisco Bay Area. As of 2026, this the most recent time that teams from the same state met in the World Series in back-to-back years. Prior to that, it had last occurred in 1955-1956 with the New York Yankees and Brooklyn Dodgers.

This was the fourth World Series meeting between the Athletics and Giants (1905, 1911, 1913), dating back to when both teams were in Philadelphia and New York City respectively. The Giants won the former (1905), while the Athletics won the latter two (1911, 1913). The Athletics swept the Giants to win their first World Series title since 1974, and ninth overall.

Dave Stewart pitched a five-hit complete-game shutout in Game 1 as the Athletics won 5–0. The Giants were unable to solve Mike Moore or the Athletics' relief pitchers as the Athletics took Game 2 by four runs to take a 2–0 series lead headed to the other side of the bay. When the series moved to San Francisco for Game 3, the series was interrupted by the 1989 Loma Prieta earthquake, which occurred before the start of the game, causing major damage to both Oakland and San Francisco. Candlestick Park in San Francisco suffered damage to its upper deck as pieces of concrete fell from the baffle at the top of the stadium and power was knocked out. The game was postponed out of concerns for the safety of everyone in the ballpark as well as the loss of power. Game 3 of the series resumed on October 27, where the Athletics blew out the Giants to take a commanding three-games-to-none lead in the series. In Game 4, Rickey Henderson’s lead-off home run would ignite the Athletics’ offense as they prevailed in a slugfest to complete the sweep. The Athletics chose not to celebrate their World Series victory with champagne out of respect for the earthquake victims.

With the win, the Athletics improved their World Series record against the Giants to 3–1. To date, this is the most recent championship won by the Athletics, and the team would move to Las Vegas after the 2024 season due to declining on-field performance and attendance. They would return to the World Series the following year, but were swept by the Cincinnati Reds in one of the biggest upsets in World Series history.

The Giants would return to the World Series in 2002, but they fell to their cross-state foe in the Anaheim Angels in seven games after being six outs away from the title in Game 6. The Giants would eventually win the World Series in 2010 over the Texas Rangers in five games, marking the start of a dynasty for the team.

== Broadcasting ==
NBC televised both LCS nationally in the United States. ABC then aired the World Series. This was the last year of ABC and NBC's postseason rights dating back to 1976, as CBS signed a four-year contract to become MLB's exclusive national broadcast television partner from 1990 to 1993.
