= Ernie Whitt =

American baseball player (born 1952)

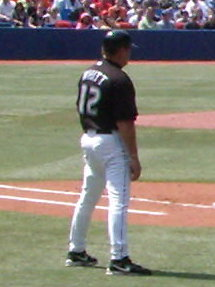
- Whitt with the Toronto Blue Jays in 2008
- Catcher
- Born: June 13, 1952 (age 74); Detroit, Michigan, U.S.
- Batted: Left Threw: Right

MLB debut
- September 12, 1976, for the Boston Red Sox

Last MLB appearance
- July 3, 1991, for the Baltimore Orioles

MLB statistics
- Batting average: .249
- Home runs: 134
- Runs batted in: 534
- Stats at Baseball Reference

Teams
- Boston Red Sox (1976); Toronto Blue Jays (1977–1978, 1980–1989); Atlanta Braves (1990); Baltimore Orioles (1991)

Career highlights and awards
- All-Star (1985)

Member of the Canadian

Baseball Hall of Fame
- Induction: 2009
Medals
Men's baseball
Manager for Canada
Baseball World Cup
Bronze medal – third place	2011 Panama	Team
Pan American Games
Gold medal – first place	2011 Guadalajara	Team
Gold medal – first place	2015 Toronto	Team
Silver medal – second place	2019 Lima	Team

Leo Ernest Whitt (born June 13, 1952) is an American professional baseball manager and former player. He played 15 seasons in Major League Baseball (MLB) as a catcher, including twelve for the Toronto Blue Jays, and was the last player from the franchise's inaugural season of 1977 to remain through 1989. He is the longtime manager of the Canada national baseball team, having served in the role since 2004.

Whitt made his MLB debut for the Boston Red Sox in 1976. For eight consecutive seasons from 1982 to 1989, he reached double figures in home runs and 100 hits in each of five consecutive seasons from 1985 to 1989. He was selected as an All-Star in 1985.

As manager for Canada’s senior national team, his competitions include the 2004 Summer Olympics, six World Baseball Classic (WBC) tournaments, and the Pan Am Games, where they won two gold medals in 2011 and 2015. Whitt was inducted into the Ontario Sports Hall of Fame in 1997 and the Canadian Baseball Hall of Fame in 2009.

== Playing career ==
=== Boston Red Sox (1976) ===
Whitt was selected in the 15th round of the 1972 amateur draft by the Boston Red Sox, and he made his major league debut on September 12, 1976, pinch hitting for Carlton Fisk in the seventh inning, grounding out. He finished the game as the Red Sox catcher, as Boston defeated the Cleveland Indians 11–3. Whitt recorded his first career hit on September 21, hitting a home run off Jim Colborn of the Milwaukee Brewers in a 3–1 loss. He appeared in eight games with Boston, batting .222 with a home run and 3 RBI. With his path to the majors blocked by future Hall-of-Famer Fisk, he was left unprotected during the expansion draft held after the 1976 season and selected by the Blue Jays.

=== Toronto Blue Jays (1977–89) ===
Whitt began the 1977 season in the minors, but after an injury to Rick Cerone, he was called up to the Blue Jays in May to serve as the second-string catcher behind Alan Ashby. However, Whitt saw very little playing time with the Blue Jays in 1977. Appearing in 23 games, he hit .171 with no home runs and 6 RBI. Whitt's major league season ended on August 16, when Cerone was reinstated from the disabled list and resumed working in tandem with Ashby. Whitt was sent back to the minors and was not recalled in September.

In 1978, he spent most of the year in triple-A. Called up in September to Toronto, he played in just two games, going hitless in four at-bats. In 1979, Whitt spent the entire season with the Syracuse Chiefs, the Blue Jays AAA affiliate in the International League. Whitt speculated in his autobiography that Blue Jays manager Roy Hartsfield had a low opinion of his potential, as most of the catching duties went to Alan Ashby and Rick Cerone. With Hartsfield's departure prior to the 1980 season, new manager Bobby Mattick expanded Whitt's role as a player, and Whitt remained with the club for the next ten years.

In 1980, Whitt became the Blue Jays starting catcher, as he appeared in 106 games, hitting .237 with six home runs and 34 RBI. He saw his numbers slip in 1981, as Whitt hit .236 with a home run and 16 RBI in 74 games during the strike-shortened season. On May 15 of the latter year, his fly ball was caught by Cleveland Indian outfielder Rick Manning for the final out of Len Barker's perfect game.

Whitt broke out offensively in 1982. Throughout 105 games, he hit .261 with 11 home runs and 42 RBI for the Blue Jays. His 11 home runs ranked third on the team.

In 1985, Whitt was named to the 1985 Major League Baseball All-Star Game. He appeared in the game in the sixth inning as a defensive replacement for Carlton Fisk and caught teammate Dave Stieb. Whitt also caught in the seventh inning for Donnie Moore of the California Angels before Gary Ward of the Texas Rangers pinch hit for Whitt in the eighth inning. During the season, Whitt hit .245 with 19 home runs and 64 RBI, as he helped the Blue Jays make the playoffs for the first time in team history. In the 1985 ALCS against the Kansas City Royals, Whitt appeared in all seven games, hitting .190 with 2 RBI as the Blue Jays lost the series.

On September 14, 1987, Whitt hit three home runs in a game against the Baltimore Orioles, helping the Blue Jays hit a major league record ten home runs in the game. Toronto defeated the Orioles 18–3. Whitt would have the best season of his career in 1987, as he hit .269 with 19 home runs and 75 RBI in 135 games.

In 1989, Whitt played in 129 games, hitting .262 with 11 home runs, his lowest total in a season since 1982, and his 53 RBI were the lowest total since 1984. In the playoffs, Whitt played in all five games against the Oakland Athletics in the 1989 ALCS, batting .125 with a home run and 3 RBI, as the Blue Jays lost the series.

To make room for young catchers Pat Borders and Greg Myers on the major league roster, on December 17, 1989, the Blue Jays traded Whitt and Kevin Batiste to the Atlanta Braves for Ricky Trlicek. Whitt was the last player from the expansion 1977 team to play for the Blue Jays.

=== Atlanta Braves (1990) ===
Whitt joined the Atlanta Braves for the 1990 season, and had a disappointing season, as he hit .172 with two home runs and 10 RBI in 67 games. On October 15, the Braves released Whitt.

=== Baltimore Orioles (1991) ===
On April 7, 1991, Whitt returned to the American League, signing with the Baltimore Orioles. In 35 games, Whitt hit .242 with 3 RBI, and he was released by the Orioles on July 5.

Whitt appeared in 1,328 games over his career, 1,218 of them with the Blue Jays. In his career, he recorded 938 hits, and had a batting average of .249 with 134 home runs and 534 RBI. In 12 career playoff games, Whitt hit .162 with one home run and 5 RBI.

== Business activities ==
Whitt invested in and was part owner of the Mother's Pizza chain in southern Ontario in 1983. He would frequently appear at the restaurants and sign autographs for fans. Mother's Pizza featured an "Ernie Whitt Special" pizza on the menu. The chain went bankrupt in 1992.

== Post-playing career ==
=== Honors ===
Whitt was inducted into the Ontario Sports Hall of Fame in 1997.

On June 20, 2009, it was announced that Whitt, along with former major league right fielder Larry Walker, were inducted into the Canadian Baseball Hall of Fame.

=== Managerial and coaching career ===
Whitt remained active as an ambassador of Canadian baseball following his major league career. In the 2004 Summer Olympics in Athens, he guided the Canadian team to a fourth-place finish in the baseball tournament. Whitt also managed the Canada national baseball team to a third-place finish in Pool B at the 2006 World Baseball Classic.

Whitt also served as both the Blue Jays' bench coach and first base coach starting in 2005, and was rumoured to be a potential replacement for then-incumbent manager John Gibbons until Gibbons and several coaches were fired midway through the 2008 season. He was the manager of the Clearwater Threshers in the Philadelphia Phillies' minor league system. Whitt continues to be a roaming instructor in the Phillies' organization.

Whitt has managed Team Canada in following World Baseball Classics, World Baseball Cup, and the Pan Am Games. In the 2011 Pan Am Games in Guadalajara, Mexico, Canada won that tournament's gold medal. and a bronze medal in the IBAF World Baseball Cup.
