= Junior Félix =

Dominican baseball player (born 1967)

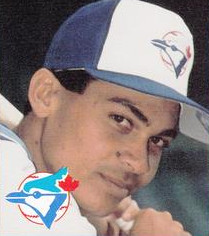
- Félix in 1988
- Right fielder / Center fielder
- Born: October 3, 1967 (age 57); Laguna Salada, Dominican Republic
- Batted: Switch Threw: Right

MLB debut
- May 3, 1989, for the Toronto Blue Jays

Last MLB appearance
- August 11, 1994, for the Detroit Tigers

MLB statistics
- Batting average: .264
- Home runs: 55
- Runs batted in: 280

KBO statistics
- Batting average: .264
- Home run: 19
- Runs batted in: 79
- Stats at Baseball Reference

Teams
- Toronto Blue Jays (1989–1990); California Angels (1991–1992); Florida Marlins (1993); Detroit Tigers (1994); LG Twins (1998–1999)

Junior Francisco Félix Sánchez (born October 3, 1967) is a Dominican former professional baseball player who played in Major League Baseball as an outfielder from 1989–1994. Baseball records list his date of birth in October 1967, but the California Angels and Florida Marlins believed he was older, possibly by up to 10 years.

== Career ==
On May 4, 1989, Félix hit the first pitch he saw in the big leagues for a home run off Kirk McCaskill, but his Blue Jays lost 3–2 in 10 innings. He was the 27th American League player ever to homer in his first major league at-bat, and the 10th to do so on the first pitch.

In the same season on June 2, at Fenway Park, in Boston, Félix hit an inside the park grand slam.

On September 2, 1990, Félix caught the final out of the Blue Jays' first no-hitter, thrown by Dave Stieb.
