= Tom Henke =

American baseball player (born 1957)

- Pitcher
- Born: December 21, 1957 (age 68); Kansas City, Missouri, U.S.
- Batted: Right Threw: Right

MLB debut
- September 10, 1982, for the Texas Rangers

Last MLB appearance
- September 30, 1995, for the St. Louis Cardinals

MLB statistics
- Win–loss record: 41–42
- Earned run average: 2.67
- Strikeouts: 861
- Saves: 311
- Stats at Baseball Reference

Teams
- Texas Rangers (1982–1984); Toronto Blue Jays (1985–1992); Texas Rangers (1993–1994); St. Louis Cardinals (1995)

Career highlights and awards
- 2× All-Star (1987, 1995); World Series champion (1992); NL Rolaids Relief Man Award (1995); AL saves leader (1987)

Member of the Canadian

Baseball Hall of Fame
- Induction: 2011

Thomas Anthony Henke (born December 21, 1957), nicknamed "the Terminator", is an American former Major League Baseball relief pitcher. He was one of the most dominant and feared closers during the late 1980s and early 1990s, pitching for the Texas Rangers (1982–1984, 1993–1994), Toronto Blue Jays (1985–1992), and St. Louis Cardinals (1995).

On the mound, Henke was easily recognizable by the large-rimmed glasses he wore at a time when many players began using contact lenses. At a height of 6' 5", he cast an imposing figure and dominated batters with his hard fastball early in the count, and his forkball for the strikeout. Henke struck out 9.8 batters per 9 innings pitched over his career.

== Early life ==
Tom Henke was born in Kansas City, Missouri, and started out throwing every night to his father, who caught his pitches while sitting on a five-gallon bucket. "Every kid should have a dad like that", Henke said. He grew up in Wardsville, Missouri, and attended Blair Oaks High School. After high school, Henke played at East Central Junior College. In 1980, a couple of friends, who believed Henke had pro-caliber stuff, told him they would buy the beer if he showed up at a talent evaluation opportunity; he did and was noticed.

== Career ==
Henke was drafted on June 5, 1979, by the Seattle Mariners in the 20th round of the 1979 Major League Baseball draft, but did not sign. On January 11, 1980, he was drafted by the Chicago Cubs in the first round (24th pick) of the 1980 Major League Baseball draft (January Secondary) but again did not sign. Henke signed with the Texas Rangers after being selected in the fourth round of the 1980 amateur draft (June Secondary).

=== Texas Rangers (1982–1984) ===
After signing with the Rangers, Henke was assigned to the Gulf Coast League Rangers in the Gulf Coast League where he had immediate success, going 3–3 with a 0.95 ERA in 38 innings, earning a promotion to the Single-A Asheville Tourists in the South Atlantic League. In 1981, Henke started the season back at Asheville, where his 8–6 record with 3 saves and 2.93 ERA in 92 innings earned him a promotion to the AA Tulsa Drillers in the Texas League. Henke spent the entire 1982 minor league season back at Tulsa, despite putting up similarly impressive numbers (14 saves with a 2.67 ERA and 100 strikeouts in 87 2/3 innings). He did, however, see time with the Rangers at the end of the season and made his major league debut on September 10. In 1983, Henke was finally promoted to the Oklahoma City 89ers in the American Association, but again his development stalled and he spent much of the next three seasons at AAA. Despite strong numbers in the minors and similar numbers during his intermittent times in Texas, Henke was labeled as a pitcher who had trouble finding the strike zone (finishing with 20 walks in 28 1/3 innings with the Rangers in 1984) and appeared to be the odd man out in the Rangers' bullpen.

=== Toronto Blue Jays (1985–1992) ===
However, Henke was selected by the Toronto Blue Jays from the Rangers on January 24, 1985, as a free agent compensation pick. After blazing through the hitters at AAA Syracuse to the tune of a 0.88 ERA and 18 saves in 51 1/3 innings over 38 appearances, he won the International League Most Valuable Pitcher Award in 1985. Henke was promoted to Toronto during the 1985 pennant drive and never looked back, not allowing a run in his first 11 appearances and finishing the season with 13 saves. Henke was then made the team's closer in 1986, and played a major role in the Toronto Blue Jays' successful run from the mid-1980s to early 1990s, finishing with 217 saves with the team and helping Toronto to its first championship, a six-game defeat of the Atlanta Braves in the 1992 World Series.

=== Texas Rangers II (1993–1994) ===
In 1993, as a free agent, Henke signed with the Texas Rangers for two years. Henke had a career-high 40 saves in 1993. In 1994, he had only 15 saves due to spending time on the disabled list.

=== St. Louis Cardinals (1995) ===
Henke, age 37, signed with the Cardinals for the 1995 season after two years with the Texas Rangers. The closer converted his first 22 saves for the team in 1995 ending with 36 total saves for the year. Henke was honored with the St. Louis Chapter of the Baseball Writers' Association (BBWAA) J. G. Taylor Spink Award as the St. Louis Baseball Man of the Year Award. Despite having just finished one of the best seasons of his career and 22nd in MVP voting, Henke decided to retire at the end of the 1995 season. "I've always admired guys who have gone out at the top of their game," Henke said. "Sometimes you have to look at what's the most important thing in life. I'd like to see my kids grow up."

== Career milestones ==
Over his 14-year career, Henke was named to the All-Star team twice: 1987, when he led the American League with 34 saves and 62 games finished, and 1995, his last season, and only season in the National League. He also won the Rolaids Relief Man of the Year Award in 1995.

Henke was the seventh reliever to eclipse the 300 saves plateau and when he retired his 311 career saves ranked 5th on the all-time career list.

Other career accomplishments are:

- 14 MLB season, 789.2 IP
- 2.67 ERA
- 1.092 WHIP
- 255 walks to 861 Ks for a 3.38 SO/BB ratio
- .982 fielding percentage
- Playoff stats: 19.2 IP / 2-0 / 1.83 ERA / 0.966 WHIP / 5 saves (all saves in 1992 playoffs for World Champion Blue Jays.)

== Personal ==
Henke lives on his 1,000-acre (4.0 km^{2}) farm in Taos, Missouri, with his family: wife Kathy and children Linsay, Ryan, Kim, and Amanda (who has Down syndrome).

Henke met his wife Kathy in college. "My catcher one day said, 'Let's go to McDonald's' and Kathy was working there at the time", Henke said. "She sold me a Big Mac and I was done. She was tall and athletic and I was pretty shy. Turns out we had a class together and started talking."

Coming from a small town with a population under 900, Henke admitted he initially had to overcome a fear of big cities. "I hated going to New York City", he said. "I felt like a fish out of water there. I'd go from the hotel to Yankee Stadium and that's it. It took me two or three years before I went out to visit the Statue of Liberty and I never took the subway." On living in Toronto, Henke said "I rented an apartment downtown for two or three years and that wasn't for me. I'm just a guy from a small town and that's where I'm most comfortable."

=== Charity involvement ===
Since 1995, Henke has teamed with the Jefferson City, Missouri, Cosmo Club to hold the annual Tom Henke Charity Classic Golf Tournament which raises money for the Special Learning Center, a school for handicapped children. He also volunteers with Down syndrome charities, the Special Olympics and the Cancer Society, and is on the board of directors with the Missouri Department of Mental Health.

=== In popular culture ===
Henke's nickname, "the Terminator", was given to him by teammate John Cerutti in 1985 after they saw the movie The Terminator together.

"The Ballad of Tom Henke" was written as a tribute to Henke's life story and "termination" of opposing batters. The 45 was released in 1985. Side 2 has "The Tom Henke Rag", an instrumental.

Henke appeared in a TV commercial for Aqua Velva.

== Honors ==
In 2000, Henke was inducted into the Missouri Sports Hall of Fame.

On August 9, 2009, the Toronto Blue Jays honored Henke with a figurine giveaway bearing his likeness.

On August 28, 2009, Henke threw out the ceremonial first pitch at Busch Stadium during the Washington Nationals vs St. Louis Cardinals baseball game.

On January 24, 2011, Henke was named to the Canadian Baseball Hall of Fame and was inducted into the Hall during a ceremony at St Marys, Ontario, on June 18, 2011.

On August 14, 2016, a final ceremony of three with Blue Jays' all-time greats was held to celebrate the club's 40th Anniversary. Henke represented the bullpen along with Duane Ward and Mike Timlin. Former Blue Jays starters Roy Halladay, Dave Stieb, Pat Hentgen and Juan Guzman were welcomed back too. The entire group exemplified top arms in club history.

In November 2018, Henke was inducted into the Ontario Sports Hall of Fame.

== See also ==
- List of Major League Baseball annual saves leaders
