= Steve Cummings (baseball) =

American baseball player (born 1964)

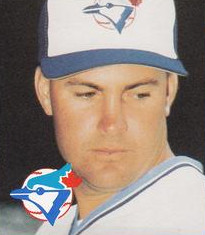
- Cummings in 1988
- Pitcher
- Born: July 15, 1964; Houston, Texas
- Batted: Both Threw: Right

MLB debut
- June 24, 1989, for the Toronto Blue Jays

Last MLB appearance
- May 30, 1990, for the Toronto Blue Jays

MLB statistics
- Win–loss record: 2–0
- Earned run average: 3.78
- Strikeouts: 12
- Stats at Baseball Reference

Teams
- Toronto Blue Jays (1989–1990)

Steven Brent Cummings (born July 15, 1964) is an American former professional baseball player. A pitcher, Cummings played Major League Baseball from 1989 to 1990 with the Toronto Blue Jays.

Cummings attended the University of Houston, where he received an associate degree in science.

== See also ==
- Houston Cougars baseball
