= George Bell (outfielder) =

Dominican baseball player (born 1959)

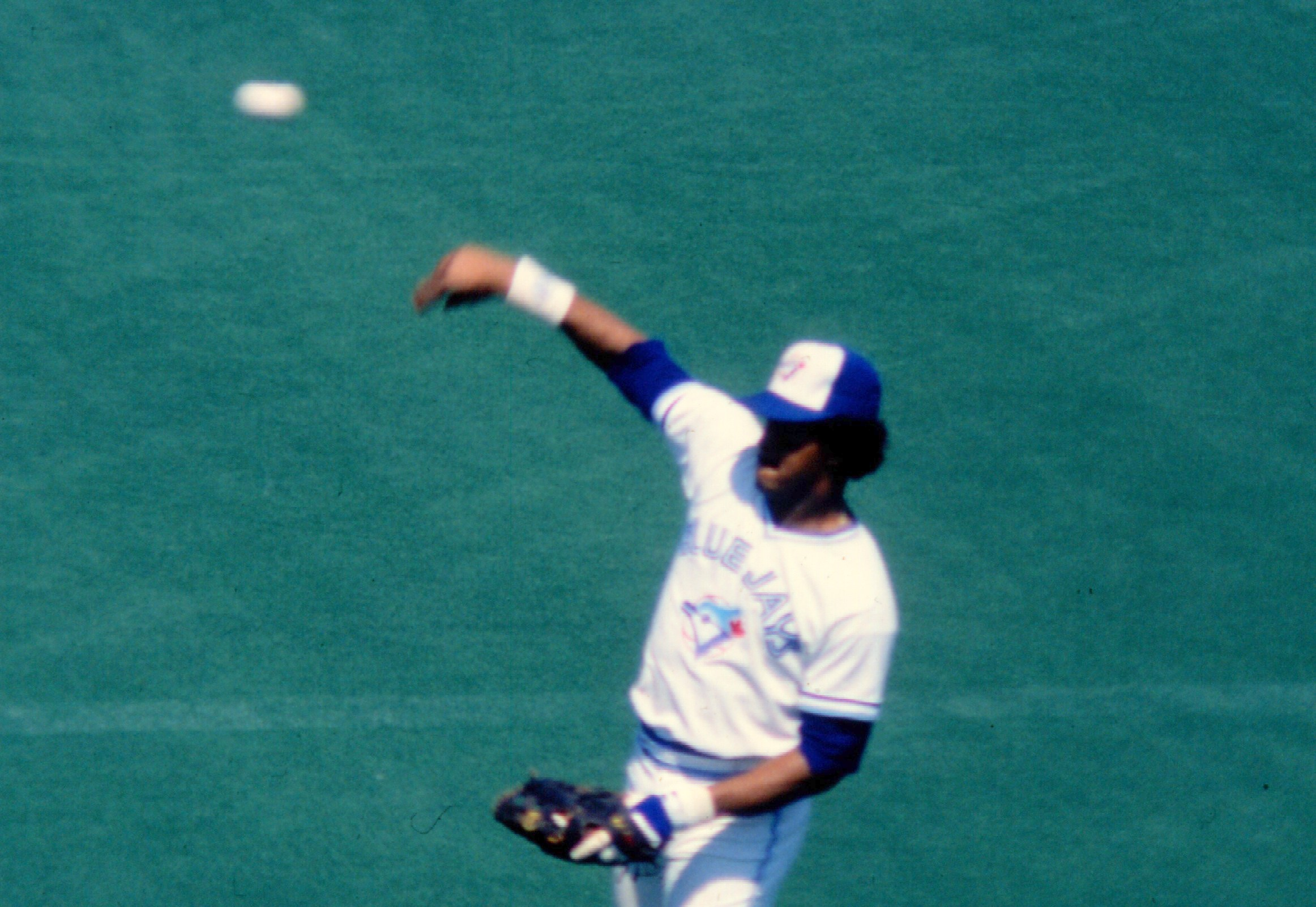
- Bell playing for the Blue Jays in 1985
- Left fielder
- Born: October 21, 1959 (age 67); San Pedro de Macorís, Dominican Republic
- Batted: Right Threw: Right

MLB debut
- April 9, 1981, for the Toronto Blue Jays

Last MLB appearance
- October 2, 1993, for the Chicago White Sox

MLB statistics
- Batting average: .278
- Home runs: 265
- Runs batted in: 1,002
- Stats at Baseball Reference

Teams
- Toronto Blue Jays (1981, 1983–1990); Chicago Cubs (1991); Chicago White Sox (1992–1993)

Career highlights and awards
- 3× All-Star (1987, 1990, 1991); AL MVP (1987); 3× Silver Slugger Award (1985–1987); AL RBI leader (1987); Toronto Blue Jays Hall of Excellence

Member of the Canadian

Baseball Hall of Fame
- Induction: 2013

Jorge Antonio Bell Mathey (born October 21, 1959), better known as George Bell, is a Dominican former left fielder and American League MVP in Major League Baseball who played 12 seasons for the Toronto Blue Jays (1981, 1983–1990), Chicago Cubs (1991) and Chicago White Sox (1992–1993). Bell batted and threw right-handed.

== Career ==
George Bell is a member of the Toronto Blue Jays' Level of Excellence.

Originally signed by the Philadelphia Phillies in 1978, Bell was selected by the Toronto Blue Jays in the 1980 Rule 5 draft. Bell was discovered in the Dominican Republic by Blue Jays scout Epy Guerrero. He made his major league debut as a pinch runner on April 9, 1981, against the Detroit Tigers. Bell appeared in 60 games during the 1981 season, batting .233 with five home runs and 12 runs batted in (RBI). In 1982, he spent the season with the Triple-A Syracuse Chiefs, where he hit just .200 with three home runs and 19 RBI in 37 games. In 1983, he split the season between Syracuse and Toronto. With the Blue Jays, Bell batted .268 with two home runs and 17 RBI in 39 games. In 85 games with Syracuse, he hit .271 with 15 home runs and 59 RBI.

Bell's first season as a regular was in 1984, and he finished his first full season batting .292 with 26 home runs and 87 RBI in 159 games. That season, he first teamed with fellow outfielders Lloyd Moseby and Jesse Barfield. That outfield, along with solid starting pitching, led the Blue Jays to their first-ever American League East division title in 1985. Bell caught a fly ball, off the bat of Ron Hassey, for the final out in the 5–1 victory over the New York Yankees on October 5, clinching the division title for the Blue Jays. Despite Bell's .321 average in the ALCS, they lost the series to the Kansas City Royals. His best season came in 1987, although the Blue Jays fell two games short of the Detroit Tigers in the division race. Bell finished with a .308 batting average, .352 on-base percentage, .608 slugging percentage, 111 runs, 47 home runs, a league-leading 134 RBI, and a major-league leading 369 total bases in 156 games. He was awarded the American League MVP award that year.

On April 4, 1988, Bell became the first player in Major League history to hit three home runs on an opening day (all of them coming off of Bret Saberhagen); however, his play throughout the year declined as he conflicted with Blue Jays manager Jimy Williams, who wanted Bell to become the Jays' full-time designated hitter. He finished the season batting .269 with 24 home runs and 97 RBI in 156 games.

Bell had a bounce-back year in 1989, posting a .297 average, 18 home runs and 104 RBI in 153 games, helping the Blue Jays win their second division title. On May 28, 1989, Bell hit a walk-off home run in a 7–5 victory over the Chicago White Sox in the final Major League game played at Exhibition Stadium. Bell also homered in the first game at the Blue Jays' new park, SkyDome (now the Rogers Centre), on June 5, eight days later. However, in the ALCS, he only hit .200 with one home run, as the Blue Jays lost the series to the Oakland Athletics. Bell became a free agent after the 1990 season.

On December 6, 1990, Bell signed a three-year deal with the Chicago Cubs worth a guaranteed $13 million. The deal included an option for a fourth year. He batted .285 with 25 home runs and 86 RBI in 149 games, earning his third and final selection to the All-Star Game. After one year with the Cubs, he was traded across town to the Chicago White Sox for Sammy Sosa and Ken Patterson on March 30, 1992. In his first season with the White Sox, Bell hit .255 while recording 25 home runs and 112 RBI in 155 games. In 1993, his play declined, primarily due to a persistent knee injury, and he finished with a .217 average, 13 home runs and 64 RBI in 102 games. In a game against the Boston Red Sox, Aaron Sele threw at Bell's head twice, which caused Bell to charge at Sele. Bell went to punch him but Sele dodged it before Bell got clotheslined by Mo Vaughn and sparking a benches-clearing brawl. Bell was suspended for two games for his actions. He was benched in the ALCS against his former team, the Blue Jays, and was released at the end of the season, after which he announced his retirement.

Bell was a powerful free-swinger, usually posting a good slugging percentage and relatively low strikeout rate, but a poor on-base percentage. He was known as a mediocre defensive player and played mainly as a designated hitter during the last two years of his career, despite his strong preference for playing in the field. Despite his success on the field, Bell had a love-hate relationship with the fans and media in Toronto, particularly in his later years as his declining defensive game came to overshadow his offensive talents. After the fans booed him for committing an error, he told the media that the fans could "kiss my purple butt." The next day a sign appeared in left field "George, we are behind you all the way." Bell's difficult relationship with the Toronto sports media was exacerbated by his reluctance to do interviews during his early years with the Blue Jays (which was due to his then-weak knowledge of the English language). Towards the end of his time in Toronto, however, Bell warmed to the media, who in turn began to soften their often harsh criticisms of his play and attitude.

Bell is enshrined in the upper deck of the Rogers Centre's Level of Excellence, devoted to players and personnel who have made a significant impact as members of the Toronto Blue Jays.

In 2004, Bell was inducted into the Caribbean Baseball Hall of Fame. In 2013, he was inducted into the Canadian Baseball Hall of Fame and Ontario Sports Hall of Fame.

== Career statistics ==
In 1,587 games over 12 seasons, Bell posted a .278 batting average (1,702-for-6,123) with 814 runs, 308 doubles, 34 triples, 265 home runs, 1,002 RBI, 331 base on balls, .316 on-base percentage and .469 slugging percentage. He recorded a .964 fielding percentage. In the 1985 and 1989 ALCS, he hit .271 (13-for-48) with six runs, a home run and 3 RBI.

== Personal life ==
Bell is the older brother of late major leaguer Juan Bell.

== See also ==
- List of Major League Baseball career home run leaders
- List of Major League Baseball players from the Dominican Republic
- List of Major League Baseball career runs batted in leaders
- List of Major League Baseball annual runs batted in leaders
