= Dave Stieb =

American baseball player (born 1957)

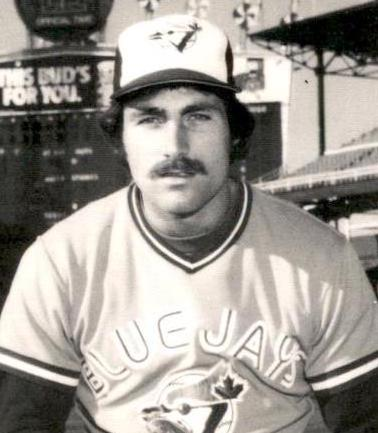
- Stieb with the Toronto Blue Jays in 1980
- Pitcher
- Born: July 22, 1957 (age 69); Santa Ana, California, U.S.
- Batted: Right Threw: Right

MLB debut
- June 29, 1979, for the Toronto Blue Jays

Last MLB appearance
- September 25, 1998, for the Toronto Blue Jays

MLB statistics
- Win–loss record: 176–137
- Earned run average: 3.44
- Strikeouts: 1,669
- Stats at Baseball Reference

Teams
- Toronto Blue Jays (1979–1992); Chicago White Sox (1993); Toronto Blue Jays (1998)

Career highlights and awards
- 7× All-Star (1980, 1981, 1983–1985, 1988, 1990); AL ERA leader (1985); Pitched a no-hitter on September 2, 1990; Toronto Blue Jays Hall of Excellence

Member of the Canadian

Baseball Hall of Fame
- Induction: 2005

David Andrew Stieb (/ˈstiːb/; born July 22, 1957) is an American former Major League Baseball (MLB) starting pitcher who spent the majority of his career with the Toronto Blue Jays. A seven-time All-Star, he won The Sporting News' Pitcher of the Year Award in 1982. His 56.9 career wins above replacement (according to Baseball-Reference) are the highest of any Blue Jays player, and he also holds the franchise records for complete games (103), strikeouts (1,658), and innings pitched (2,873).

A promising outfielder prospect at Southern Illinois University, Stieb was converted to a starting pitcher after being drafted by the Blue Jays, who told him that it would be the quickest way to get him to the majors. Fast-tracked through the minors, he debuted in 1979. Stieb led the American League (AL) in earned run average (ERA) in 1985, finishing in the top five four other times (1982, 1983, 1984, and 1990). Stieb also twice led the AL in innings pitched (1982 and 1984). Injury prevented him from playing in the 1992 postseason, where the Blue Jays won their first World Series. After a stint with the Chicago White Sox, Stieb retired from baseball, only to make a brief return as a reliever for the Blue Jays in 1998 before retiring for good.

Stieb won 140 games in the 1980s, the second-highest total by a pitcher in that decade, behind only his rival (and later teammate) Jack Morris. He was known for flirting with no-hitters, having reached the ninth inning with no hits four times in five years before accomplishing the feat in 1990. As of the end of the 2026 season, Stieb's no-hitter remains the only one in Blue Jays history.

== Early years ==
Born in Santa Ana, California, Stieb was primarily an outfielder during his time at Oak Grove High School and at San Jose City College. In his later college years, he played varsity baseball at Southern Illinois University. At this point, Stieb played primarily as an outfielder. In his 1978 junior season, Stieb hit .394 with 12 home runs and 48 RBIs, and was named to The Sporting News's All-American team (along with Kirk Gibson and Bob Horner).

Scouted by Bobby Mattick and Al LaMacchia of the Blue Jays as an outfield prospect in a varsity game, Stieb's performance failed to impress until he was pressed into service as a relief pitcher. His pitching surprised and convinced the Blue Jays to draft him in the 1978 Major League Baseball draft. Stieb was initially reluctant to take the mound as a starting pitcher until he was told by the Blue Jays front office that "the quickest way to make it [to the major leagues] would be pitching."

== Career ==
Stieb entered the Blue Jays farm system with very little pitching experience. Over the course of his college career, he pitched a grand total of 17 innings, mostly in relief. Nevertheless, he made four starts with the Single-A Dunedin Blue Jays in 1978, working to a 2.08 ERA. In 1979, he was promoted to the Blue Jays' AAA affiliate, the Syracuse Chiefs, working to a 2.12 ERA over a 5–2 record and 51 innings pitched. He made his first start for the Blue Jays on June 29, 1979, just a year after being drafted as an outfielder and with just 128 innings pitched in the minors.

Stieb made 18 starts in 1979, ending with seven complete games, a 4.31 ERA, and an 8–8 record (the best winning percentage on the pitching staff). Nevertheless, the Blue Jays were the worst team in the majors, struggling to a 53–109 record. The 1980 season was a big step for Stieb (if not for the team), who worked to a 3.71 ERA and established himself as the No. 2 starter in the rotation (behind Jim Clancy). This was after an April where he was named AL Pitcher of the Month, pitching to a 1.06 ERA over four games (three complete). At the end of April, the Blue Jays were atop the AL East, but faltered as the season went on and ended with a meager 67–95 record. However, Stieb was named to his first All-Star Game.

With a 3.19 ERA, Stieb led the Blue Jays staff in 1981 (ranking third among AL pitchers for WAR), though the season was shortened due to the 1981 strike. Friction between Stieb and management led to talk of an offseason trade (including one with the Philadelphia Phillies for Ryne Sandberg), but he was eventually considered too valuable to trade.

In 1982, Stieb worked to a 3.25 ERA, good enough for fifth in the AL, and a 17-14 record. He led the league in complete games (19) and innings pitched, with 288.1 (22 more than teammate Clancy, the next closest). For the first time he received votes for the Cy Young Award, finishing fourth behind winner Pete Vuckovich (who led the league in wins but had a worse ERA); he did win the Sporting News Pitcher of the Year Award. At the end of the season, he signed a six-year, $5 million contract with Toronto. In 1983, he again won 17 games and finished third in AL ERA (3.04) and second in IP (278.0). However, he did not receive any Cy Young votes.

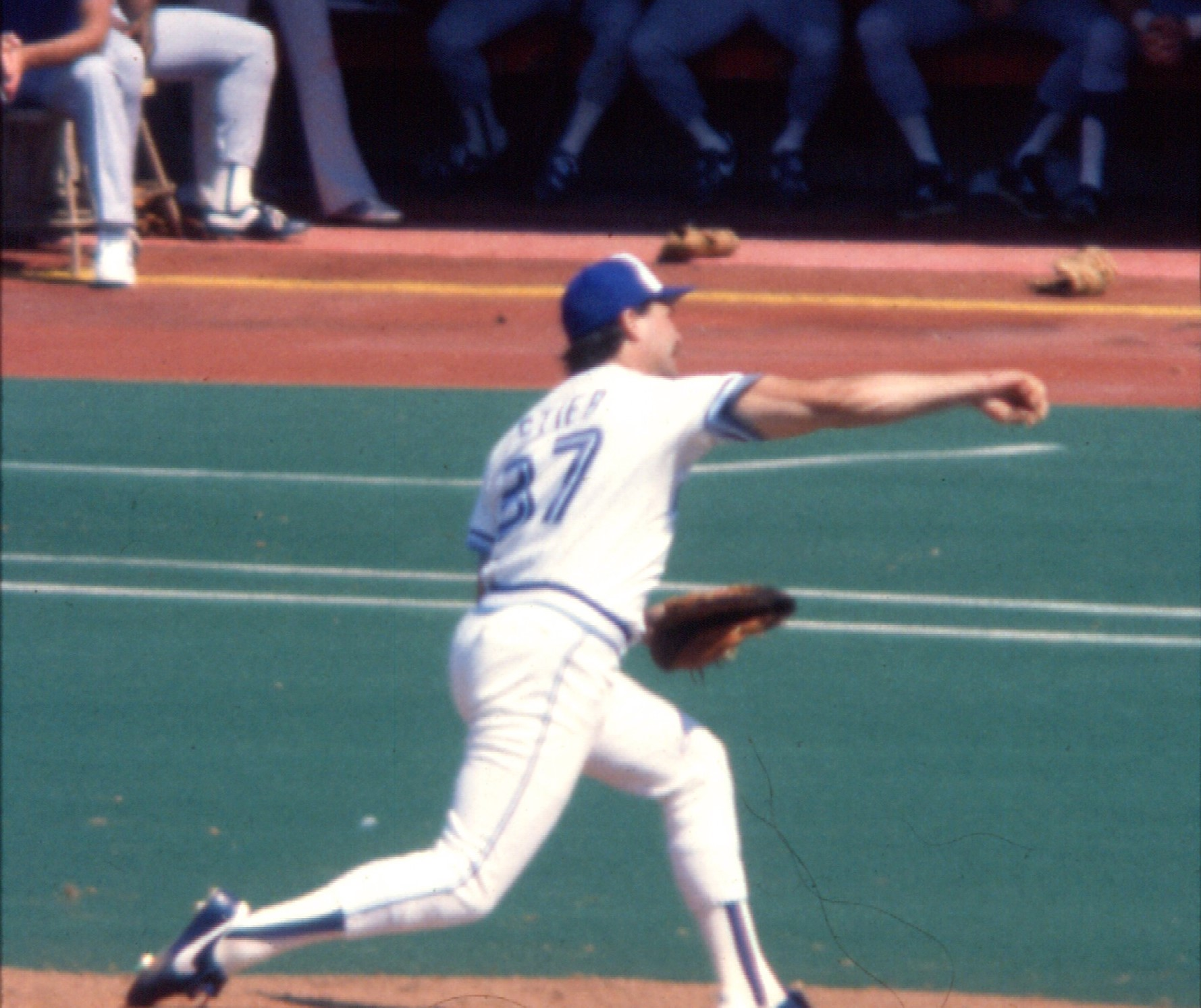
Stieb pitching for the Blue Jays in 1985

Stieb finished with a 16-8 record in 1984, as Toronto finished second in the AL East to the Detroit Tigers, headlined by Stieb's rival Jack Morris, who eventually won the 1984 World Series. Stieb worked to a 2.83 ERA, started the All-Star Game, and led the majors in IP (267.0) and in WAR (7.9), but finished seventh in Cy Young voting. The 1985 season saw Stieb led the AL with a 2.48 ERA, as well as the Blue Jays' first postseason appearance; Stieb started three games (1, 4, and 7) in the ALCS, but the Blue Jays fell to the eventual World Series champion Kansas City Royals. Despite his strong campaign, he again finished seventh in Cy Young balloting, losing out to Bret Saberhagen of the Royals.

In 1985, Stieb signed with the Blue Jays what was then one of the most lucrative contracts in baseball. The contract, including options exercisable by the team, was for a term of eleven years and specified a salary that increased to $1.9 million in 1993, $2 million in 1994, and $2.1 million in 1995. While this was seen to be generous at the time the contract was signed, by the time the later years of the contract came around this was a bargain, considering that several players were receiving several times the amount per year. The Blue Jays voluntarily renegotiated the last three years of his contract to pay him a higher amount in recognition of his years of service.

Stieb finished the 1986 season 7-12, struggling to a 4.74 ERA. He improved in 1987, finishing with a 4.09 ERA in 185 IP, and in 1988, with a 3.04 ERA. However, Toronto struggled to repeat the success it found in 1985.

Stieb was known for flirting with, and struggling to close out, no-hitters. He took a no-hitter into the ninth inning in a 1985 game; this bid was broken up by back-to-back home runs and Stieb was replaced in the game before he recorded an out in the ninth. In 1988, he was a single strike away from a no-hitter in two successive starts, on September 24 against Cleveland and September 30 against Baltimore; both attempts were broken up on 2-2 counts by the 27th batter (Julio Franco and Jim Traber, respectively). Both hits were also considered to be fluky hits, with Franco's taking an unexpected hop on the infield that caused the ball to bound over the second baseman's glove, and Traber's hit coming on a weak flare that was just out of the reach of the first baseman. On August 4, 1989, he nearly had a perfect game, but it too was broken up with two outs in the ninth. On September 2, 1990, he pitched the first (and, as of 2025, only) no-hitter in Blue Jays history, defeating the Cleveland Indians 3–0.

Going into the 1989 season, Stieb brought a scoreless streak to 34 straight innings, the longest such streak in franchise history, before giving up one run to the Royals on April 5, 1989. He finished the season at 17-8 with a 3.35 ERA, but lost both of his starts in the ALCS, as Toronto fell to the eventual-world champion Oakland Athletics. In 1990, Stieb finished with a 2.93 ERA, fifth in the AL, and earned his seventh and last All-Star nomination. He also finally pitched his no-hitter against the Indians in September.

After an excellent 1990 season, a series of shoulder and back injuries early in the 1991 season ended his effective pitching years, culminating in a 4–6 season in 1992 that resulted in his release after the season ended. He was awarded a World Series ring after the Blue Jays won their first championship later that year, despite not pitching in the postseason due to injuries. In 1993, he played four games with the Chicago White Sox, before finally retiring due to lingering back problems.

In 1998, Stieb returned to the Blue Jays as a spring training coach. Despite a five-year hiatus from baseball, Stieb noticed that his old injuries did not bother him while throwing, and he eventually asked manager Tim Johnson for the opportunity to pitch. At 40 years old, he worked his way through the minors and eventually pitched in 19 games (three starts) for the major league club, going 1–2 with a 4.83 ERA.

== Pitching style ==
Stieb entered the league primarily as a power pitcher, relying on a high, inside fastball to strike batters out. The brushback pitch was an integral part of his repertoire to back batters off the plate, and was especially tough on right-handed hitters in this respect. As a result, he was the leader in hit batsmen in the American League in 1981, 1983, 1984, 1986, and 1989, and he was in the top three in 1985, 1988, and 1990. But arguably his best pitch was his slider that had a late and very sharp break, especially difficult for right-handed batters to handle; modern commentators have characterized this pitch as a "sweeper," though the term was not in use during Stieb's career.

Later on in his career he developed his breaking ball repertoire, and he became very effective with a "dead fish" curveball that would break into the dirt as the batter swung.

Stieb had a high-strung personality and was known as a fierce competitor on the mound; he was regularly seen having animated conversations with himself between pitches when in difficult situations. Whereas with other pitchers this would be seen as a sign of weakness, with Stieb it was perceived as the best way to motivate himself to get out of a jam. Early in his career, Stieb would also frequently yell at his teammates after errors, for plays that he thought they should have made. His personality also did not endear him to baseball writers, according to columnist Stephen Brunt:

He was angry. Eventually, you figured out that he was almost always angry. Some teammate had let him down by not making a play, some writer had written something that had struck him as unfair or, more likely, he was beating himself up for a pitch not made, for some minor imperfection. A shrink might have found him a sympathetic figure, but among a bunch of sports writers feeling a deadline approach and waiting forever for Stieb to deign to speak to them, there were few warm thoughts.

In later years, Stieb mellowed somewhat, although a fierce glare after a botched play was still not uncommon.

== Personal life ==
He was inducted into the Canadian Baseball Hall of Fame, located in St. Marys, Ontario, with the Class of 2005.

As of 2016, Stieb resided in Reno, Nevada, where he worked as a building contractor.

Stieb's older brother, Steve, was a catcher and pitcher in the Atlanta Braves minor league system from 1979 to 1981.

== Legacy ==
During his career, Stieb won 176 games while losing 137. Only Jack Morris won more games in the 1980s. Stieb holds career records for Toronto pitchers in wins, games started, shutouts, strikeouts, complete games and a variety of other categories. Stieb appeared in seven All-Star games, also a Blue Jays team record.

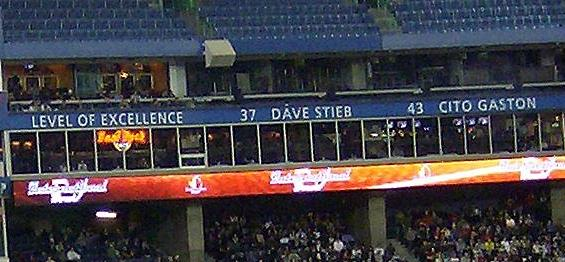
Stieb's name is honored by the Blue Jays in the Rogers Centre.

Baseball writer and statistician Bill James called Dave Stieb, in his prime, the best pitcher of his era. He compared Stieb to Jim Bunning, arguing that both pitchers deserved "more than one" Cy Young Award, but never won one, thanks to poor run support. In 2009, a panel of Baseball-Reference historians listed him as the fourth best pitcher of the 1980s, behind Tommy John and Hall-of-Famers Nolan Ryan and Bert Blyleven (and ahead of Jack Morris).

On August 29, 2010, Stieb threw the ceremonial first pitch at the Rogers Centre, celebrating the 20th anniversary of his no-hitter game, with the anniversary coming four days after the celebration. Stieb's number 37 was written on the pitcher's mound for that game and 10,000 bobbleheads of Stieb were handed out to fans upon entrance.

Stieb's autobiography, Tomorrow I'll Be Perfect, was co-written with Kevin Boland and released in 1986.

Stieb was the subject of a 2022 four-part miniseries by Secret Base's Jon Bois and Alex Rubenstein, entitled Captain Ahab: The Story of Dave Stieb; in addition to discussing his career, the series advocated for his induction into the National Baseball Hall of Fame based on his accomplishments. It was an effort to invoke empathy for him due to his six no-hitters lost past the sixth inning (especially the three lost after 26 outs) and his lack of representation because of his lower win totals compared to other dominant pitchers since the Blue Jays' less-than-optimal run support for him prevented him from achieving ones higher. The New York Times praised Captain Ahab as "not a standard, staid hagiography — it’s a whimsical and discursive look at statistics, passion, fandom, culture in general and baseball culture in particular". Paste magazine and Polygon included the series in their lists of the best documentaries and video essays (respectively) of 2022.

=== Hall of Fame consideration ===
Stieb became eligible for the National Baseball Hall of Fame in 2004, but received only seven votes (1.4%) and fell off the ballot in his first year. He was omitted from the Modern Baseball ballots in 2018 and 2020 and the Contemporary Baseball ballot in 2023.

Since falling off the ballot, Stieb's candidacy has attracted renewed interest. Part of the reason has been the emergence of advanced sabermetrics; among starting pitchers in the 1980s, Stieb leads the decade in wins above replacement (WAR) and adjusted ERA+. Writing for The Athletic in 2020, Joe Posnanski listed Stieb as one of the 100 best players not in the Hall of Fame. Posnanski called Stieb "a master at being underrated and underappreciated," noting that Stieb has a higher JAWS score (measuring a player's merit for induction into the Hall) than Dennis Eckersley, who was also on his first ballot in 2004 and inducted with 414 votes. Jay Jaffe of Baseball Prospectus (the creator of JAWS) wrote that Stieb, along with Orel Hershiser, was the best pitcher from "[a] very underrepresented era of pitchers" in the Hall of Fame, adding that his career "[fits] well within the range of many Hall of Fame starters whose places in Cooperstown don’t keep us lying awake at night."

In their Captain Ahab documentary series, Alex Rubenstein and Jon Bois suggested that Stieb's brief comeback in 1998 hurt his candidacy; by "restarting the clock" on the five-year retirement period necessary before consideration, Rubenstein and Bois argued, Stieb guaranteed that the BBWAA members voting in 2004 would barely remember his dominant seasons of the early 1980s.

In 2017, Stieb told The Sporting News that, based on the traditional metric of wins-and-losses, he knew that he didn't belong in the Hall of Fame. However, he added that he felt he did not deserve to be "just wiped off the map" after one year on the ballot. "It's like an insult," he said. "What it told me was in [the voters'] minds, I didn't even do anything worth recognizing."

== Awards and accomplishments ==
- Seven-time MLB All-Star
- World Series champion (1992)
- AL ERA leader (1985)
- Pitched a no-hitter on September 2, 1990
- 1982 Sporting News Pitcher of the Year Award
- Toronto Blue Jays Level of Excellence
- Canadian Baseball Hall of Fame (inducted 2005)
- Ontario Sports Hall of Fame (inducted 2014)
- San Jose Sports Hall of Fame (inducted 2023)

== See also ==
- List of Major League Baseball annual ERA leaders
- List of Major League Baseball career hit batsmen leaders
- List of Major League Baseball no-hitters

Preceded by Mark Bomback	Toronto Blue Jays Opening Day; Starting pitcher 1983	Succeeded by Jim Clancy
Preceded by Jim Clancy	Toronto Blue Jays Opening Day; Starting pitcher 1985 & 1986	Succeeded by Jimmy Key
Preceded by Todd Stottlemyre	Toronto Blue Jays Opening Day; Starting pitcher 1991	Succeeded by Jack Morris
Preceded by Terry Mulholland	No-hitter pitcher September 2, 1990	Succeeded by Nolan Ryan
