= John Cerutti =

American baseball player (1960–2004)

- Pitcher
- Born: April 28, 1960; Albany, New York, U.S.
- Died: October 3, 2004 (aged 44); Toronto, Ontario, Canada
- Batted: Left Threw: Left

MLB debut
- September 1, 1985, for the Toronto Blue Jays

Last MLB appearance
- October 5, 1991, for the Detroit Tigers

MLB statistics
- Win–loss record: 49–43
- Earned run average: 3.94
- Strikeouts: 398
- Stats at Baseball Reference

Teams
- Toronto Blue Jays (1985–1990); Detroit Tigers (1991)

John Joseph Cerutti (April 28, 1960 – October 3, 2004) was an American left-handed pitcher in Major League Baseball for the Toronto Blue Jays and Detroit Tigers between 1985 and 1991, and was later a broadcaster for the Blue Jays.

== Early life ==
John was the second of six children. His father, Dan Cerutti, was a bricklayer. Mom Marlene was originally from St. Catherines, Ontario, in Canada.

As a kid, Cerutti was a left-handed centerfielder, so talented that his nickname was "Freddie Lynn".

Cerutti grew up a fan of the New York Yankees, and idolized Ron Guidry.

== Playing career ==
Born in Albany, New York, Cerutti attended Amherst College, and graduated with a bachelor's degree in economics. In 1980, he played collegiate summer baseball with the Harwich Mariners of the Cape Cod Baseball League and was named a league all-star.

He was selected in the first round of the amateur draft by the Blue Jays in 1981 with the 21st overall pick. Cerutti played seven seasons in the major leagues with the Blue Jays (1985–1990) and Detroit Tigers (1991).

On June 7, 1989, Cerutti recorded the first Blue Jays win in SkyDome, their new stadium.

On December 20, 1990, the Toronto Blue Jays granted him free agency. He signed as a free agent with the Detroit Tigers on January 14, 1991.

== Broadcasting career ==
After his playing career, he went into broadcasting and started calling Blue Jays games alongside Brian Williams on CBC before becoming a TV analyst for the team's new flagship station, Rogers Sportsnet.

== Death ==
Cerutti was supposed to broadcast the last game of the 2004 season for the Blue Jays, an afternoon home game on October 3 versus the New York Yankees, but he uncharacteristically missed an 11:00 am pregame meeting. The production staff began to worry and started calling him. After numerous attempts to contact him, the door of his Toronto hotel room was opened, where he was found without any vital signs, dead at age 44. Two weeks later, his death was officially declared to be of natural causes due to a ventricular arrhythmia, a condition he knew he had but had been told wasn't a major concern.

"It was an unbelievable shock," Blue Jays president Paul Godfrey said, in various wire reports. "We all realize, those of us involved in winning and losing games, how unimportant that is at a time like this."

The Toronto chapter of the Baseball Writers' Association of America paid tribute to Cerutti in November 2004, giving him its annual Good Guy Award and renaming the honor for him, as Cerutti was known for his exemplary character, goodwill, and sportsmanship. The award has been handed out every year since Toronto's inaugural season in 1977, and is given annually to an individual who best exemplifies a positive image for baseball.
