= Kevin Batiste =

American baseball player (1966–2024)

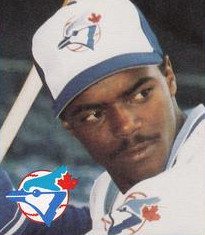
- Batiste in 1988
- Outfielder
- Born: October 21, 1966; Galveston, Texas, U.S.
- Died: April 2, 2024 (aged 57); Tomball, Texas, U.S.
- Batted: Right Threw: Right

MLB debut
- June 13, 1989, for the Toronto Blue Jays

Last MLB appearance
- June 21, 1989, for the Toronto Blue Jays

MLB statistics
- Batting average: .250
- Home runs: 0
- Runs batted in: 0
- Stats at Baseball Reference

Teams
- Toronto Blue Jays (1989)

Kevin Wade Batiste (October 21, 1966 – April 2, 2024) was an American professional baseball player. Batiste played for the Toronto Blue Jays in 1989.

Batiste was drafted by the Blue Jays in the second round of the 1985 amateur draft.

Brought up to the majors in June 1989, he played in six games between June 13 and 21. On June 24, Batiste was sent back down to the minor leagues, but while making the journey to join the Knoxville Blue Jays, he was arrested at Oakland International Airport for carrying a loaded handgun in his checked luggage. He spent about 12 hours in an Oakland city jail before the Jays paid his $13,000 bail. He resumed his career in the minors, and never returned to the major leagues.

Batiste died in Tomball, Texas, on April 2, 2024, at the age of 57.
