= Jimmy Key =

American baseball player (born 1961)

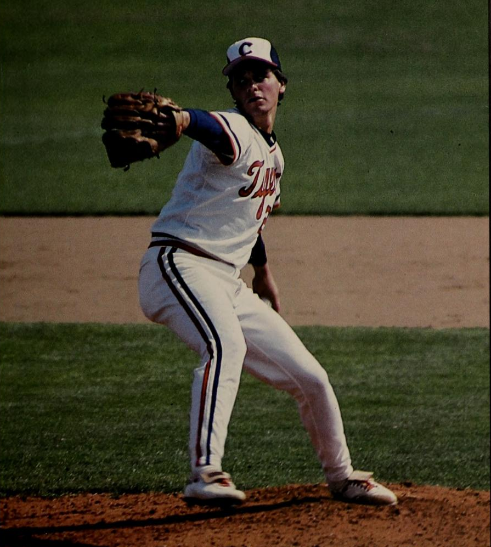
- Key pitching for Clemson in 1983
- Pitcher
- Born: April 22, 1961 (age 65); Huntsville, Alabama, U.S.
- Batted: Right Threw: Left

MLB debut
- April 6, 1984, for the Toronto Blue Jays

Last MLB appearance
- September 20, 1998, for the Baltimore Orioles

MLB statistics
- Win–loss record: 186–117
- Earned run average: 3.51
- Strikeouts: 1,538
- Stats at Baseball Reference

Teams
- Toronto Blue Jays (1984–1992); New York Yankees (1993–1996); Baltimore Orioles (1997–1998)

Career highlights and awards
- 5× All-Star (1985, 1991, 1993, 1994, 1997); 2× World Series champion (1992, 1996); MLB wins leader (1994); MLB ERA leader (1987)

Member of the Canadian

Baseball Hall of Fame
- Induction: 2024

James Edward Key (born April 22, 1961) is an American former left-handed starting pitcher in Major League Baseball who played for the Toronto Blue Jays (1984–1992), New York Yankees (1993–1996), and Baltimore Orioles (1997–1998). His best personal years were in 1987, when he posted a 17–8 record with a league-leading 2.76 ERA, and in 1993, when he went 18–6 with a 3.00 ERA and 173 strikeouts. With the Blue Jays, he won the 1992 World Series and with the Yankees, he won the 1996 World Series, both over the Atlanta Braves.

== Career ==
=== Amateur career ===
Key attended S. R. Butler High School in Huntsville, Alabama. For the school's baseball team, he compiled a 10–0 win–loss record with nine shutouts and a 0.30 earned run average (ERA) in his senior year. Key also batted .410 with 11 home runs and 35 runs batted in in his high school career.

Key attended Clemson University, where he played college baseball for the Clemson Tigers baseball team in the Atlantic Coast Conference (ACC). At Clemson, Key posted a 9–3 record and 2.79 ERA on the mound, and batted .300 with 21 doubles. Key is the only Clemson player to be a member of the first-team All-ACC in two positions (pitcher and DH) in 1982. He pitched the opening game of the 1980 College World Series.

=== Toronto Blue Jays ===
The Toronto Blue Jays selected Key in the third round of the 1982 MLB draft. He worked his way up the Blue Jays' minor league system during 1982 and 1983, putting up respectable numbers with the Florence Blue Jays (South Atlantic League), the Medicine Hat Blue Jays (Pioneer League), the Knoxville Blue Jays (Southern League), and the Syracuse Chiefs (International League) before heading to Toronto.

Key made his Major League debut on April 6, 1984, and was utilized in relief situations through his inaugural year, notching 10 saves and a 4.65 ERA. He wore number 27 in his first season and 22 for the duration of his Blue Jays career.

Key moved into the starting rotation in 1985 and quickly became a cornerstone in the rotation, leading the Blue Jays to their first postseason appearance that year. In 1987, Key led the major leagues with a 2.76 earned run average and finished second behind Roger Clemens in voting for the American League Cy Young Award.

In Game 4 of the 1992 World Series, Key made his final start for the Blue Jays, surrendering one run over 7 2/3 innings to earn a 2-1 win and put the Jays up 3 games to 1. He left the game to a tremendous ovation. Key would appear once more in the series, as a reliever in the 10th and 11th innings of the 6th and deciding game, earning another winning decision in the series.

=== New York Yankees ===
As a free agent, Key signed a four-year contract worth $17 million with the New York Yankees on December 10, 1992. He posted a 49–23 record in 94 games over four seasons with the Yankees. He had his career high of 173 strikeouts in the first year with the Yankees in 1993, and he led the majors with 17 wins in the strike-shortened season of 1994.

He spent time with the Gulf Coast Yankees (1–0 and 0.00 ERA) and Tampa (0–0 and 2.77 ERA) of the Florida State League during rehab assignments during his last season with New York in 1996. In his final start as a Yankee, he outdueled Greg Maddux of the Atlanta Braves in the deciding game of the 1996 World Series.

Jimmy Key wore the number 22 while with the Yankees.

=== Baltimore Orioles ===
Key signed as a free agent with the Baltimore Orioles on December 10, 1996, and posted a 22–13 record in 59 appearances over two seasons. A free agent in his final season, Key retired from the game after the 1998 season largely due to injuries. He made US$7.73 million with the Orioles over 2 seasons. He wore the number 21 with the Orioles (22 having been retired by Baltimore in honor of hall-of-famer Jim Palmer). He was assigned to Fredrick of the Carolina League in 1998 (1–0 3.00 ERA) during his final rehab stint. Key was granted free agency for the last time on October 27, 1998, by Orioles GM Pat Gillick, the same GM who granted him the same conditions in Toronto in 1992.

== Strengths and weaknesses ==
Key was one of the premiere control pitchers in the game with a good strikeout-to-walk ratio over most of his career. His fastball was not particularly speedy, but was often effective as he could spot it on both corners of the plate—although when his pitch went high, opponents fared well. He also possessed a fine backdoor slider. He had a very good pickoff move to first base, which he notably demonstrated in Game 4 of the 1992 World Series by picking off Otis Nixon, one of the game's premiere base stealers at the time. (During his windup his right knee was bent so that his right foot did not cross the rubber and he could throw to first base without incurring a balk).

Key tended to give up more than his share of home runs even while holding his opponents' on-base percentage to a low level. He was injury-prone with significant down time in 1988, 1989, 1990, 1995, 1996 and 1998. Contrary to some reports, Key never underwent Tommy John surgery. Instead, noted surgeon James Andrews removed bone chips, costing Key several months in the middle of the 1988 season.

== Post-career ==
Following his retirement from baseball, Key became an amateur golfer. Now living in Palm Beach Gardens, he has become prominent in the local golfing community.

== See also ==
- List of Major League Baseball annual ERA leaders
- List of Major League Baseball annual wins leaders

Preceded by Mark Langston	American League All-Star Game Starting Pitcher; 1994	Succeeded by Randy Johnson
