= 1983 Toronto Blue Jays season =

1983 Toronto Blue Jays
- League: American League
- Division: East
- Ballpark: Exhibition Stadium
- City: Toronto
- Record: 89–73 (.549)
- Divisional place: 4th
- Owners: Labatt Breweries, Imperial Trust, Canadian Imperial Bank of Commerce
- General managers: Pat Gillick
- Managers: Bobby Cox
- Television: CFTO-TV (Don Chevrier, Tony Kubek, Fergie Olver)
- Radio: CJCL (AM) (Jerry Howarth, Tom Cheek)

The 1983 Toronto Blue Jays season was the franchise's seventh season of Major League Baseball. For the first time in team history, Toronto avoided a last place finish in their division and recorded a winning record. The Blue Jays finishing fourth in the American League East with a record of 89 wins and 73 losses, starting a streak of 11 consecutive winning seasons. It was the team's first season to use the song "OK Blue Jays" in the seventh-inning stretch.

== Offseason ==
=== Transactions ===
Transactions by the Toronto Blue Jays during the off-season before the 1983 season.

==== October 1982 ====
October 27	Purchased Tucker Ashford from the New York Yankees.

==== November 1982 ====
November 1	Signed amateur free agent Nelson Liriano.
November 5	Acquired Cliff Johnson from the Oakland Athletics for Alvis Woods.
November 10	Wayne Nordhagen granted free agency.

==== December 1982 ====
December 6	Drafted Jim Acker from the Atlanta Braves in the 1982 MLB Rule 5 draft.
December 9	Acquired Dave Collins, Fred McGriff, Mike Morgan and cash from the New York Yankees for Tom Dodd and Dale Murray.
December 10	Glenn Adams granted free agency. Acquired Don Cooper from the Minnesota Twins for Dave Baker.

==== January 1983 ====
January 18	Player rights of Jerry Garvin sold to the St. Louis Cardinals.
January 31	Signed amateur free agent Enrique Burgos.

==== February 1983 ====
February 4	Acquired Jorge Orta from the New York Mets for Steve Senteney.
February 5	Acquired Cecil Fielder from the Kansas City Royals for Leon Roberts.
February 15	Signed free agent Randy Moffitt from the Houston Astros to a contract.
February 16	Signed amateur free agent Tony Castillo to a contract.
February 23	Signed free agent Mickey Klutts from the Oakland Athletics to a contract.

== Regular season ==
- Willie Upshaw became the first Blue Jay to get over 100 RBIs with 104.
- On August 4, 1983, New York Yankee Dave Winfield, while warming up before the 5th inning of a game at Toronto's Exhibition Stadium, accidentally killed a seagull with a thrown ball. He doffed his cap in mock sorrow. Fans responded by hurling obscenities and improvised missiles. After the game, he was brought to the Ontario Provincial Police station on charges of cruelty to animals and was forced to post a $500 bond before being released. Quipped Yankees manager Billy Martin, "It's the first time he's hit the cutoff man." The charges were dropped the following day. For years afterward Winfield's appearances in Toronto were greeted with loud choruses of boos, but he later became a fan favorite when he joined the team in 1992.
- During an August 24, 1983 game, Baltimore Orioles pitcher Tippy Martinez picked off three Toronto Blue Jays baserunners in one inning. The baserunners were Barry Bonnell, Dave Collins and Willie Upshaw.

=== Opening Day starters ===
- Dave Collins
- Dámaso García
- Jim Gott
- Alfredo Griffin
- Cliff Johnson
- Lloyd Moseby
- Rance Mulliniks
- Hosken Powell
- Willie Upshaw
- Ernie Whitt

=== Season standings ===
AL East
Team	W	L	Pct.	GB	Home	Road
Baltimore Orioles	98	64	.605	—	50‍–‍31	48‍–‍33
Detroit Tigers	92	70	.568	6	48‍–‍33	44‍–‍37
New York Yankees	91	71	.562	7	51‍–‍30	40‍–‍41
Toronto Blue Jays	89	73	.549	9	48‍–‍33	41‍–‍40
Milwaukee Brewers	87	75	.537	11	52‍–‍29	35‍–‍46
Boston Red Sox	78	84	.481	20	38‍–‍43	40‍–‍41
Cleveland Indians	70	92	.432	28	36‍–‍45	34‍–‍47

=== Record vs. opponents ===
1983 American League record Sources:
Team	BAL	BOS	CAL	CWS	CLE	DET	KC	MIL	MIN	NYY	OAK	SEA	TEX	TOR
Baltimore	—	8–5	7–5	7–5	6–7	5–8	8–4	11–2	8–4	6–7	8–4	8–4	9–3	7–6
Boston	5–8	—	6–6	6–6	7–6	4–9	5–7	4–9	5–7	7–6	8–4	7–5	7–5	7–6
California	5–7	6–6	—	3–10	8–4	4–8	6–7	6–6	6–7	5–7	5–8	6–7	6–7	4–8
Chicago	5–7	6–6	10–3	—	8–4	8–4	9–4	4–8	8–5	8–4	8–5	12–1	8–5	5–7
Cleveland	7–6	6–7	4–8	4–8	—	5–8	7–5	3–10	6–6	6–7	7–5	8–4	3–9	4–9
Detroit	8–5	9–4	8–4	4–8	8–5	—	7–5	6–7	9–3	5–8	6–6	8–4	8–4	6–7
Kansas City	4–8	7–5	7–6	4–9	5–7	5–7	—	6–6	6–7	6–6	7–6	8–5	8–5–1	6–6
Milwaukee	2–11	9–4	6–6	8–4	10–3	7–6	6–6	—	8–4	4–9	6–6	5–7	8–4	8–5
Minnesota	4–8	7–5	7–6	5–8	6–6	3–9	7–6	4–8	—	4–8	4–9	9–4	5–8	5–7
New York	7–6	6–7	7–5	4–8	7–6	8–5	6–6	9–4	8–4	—	8–4	7–5	7–5	7–6
Oakland	4–8	4–8	8–5	5–8	5–7	6–6	6–7	6–6	9–4	4–8	—	9–4	2–11	6–6
Seattle	4–8	5–7	7–6	1–12	4–8	4–8	5–8	7–5	4–9	5–7	4–9	—	6–7	4–8
Texas	3–9	5–7	7–6	5–8	9–3	4–8	5–8–1	4–8	8–5	5–7	11–2	7–6	—	4–8
Toronto	6–7	6–7	8–4	7–5	9–4	7–6	6–6	5–8	7–5	6–7	6–6	8–4	8–4	—

=== Transactions ===
Transactions for the Toronto Blue Jays during the 1983 regular season.

==== April 1983 ====
April 5	Returned Tucker Ashford to the New York Yankees following previous purchase.

==== June 1983 ====
June 21	Signed free agent Doyle Alexander from the New York Yankees to a contract.

==== July 1983 ====
July 7	Signed free agent Alvis Woods from the Oakland Athletics to a contract.
July 10	Released Hosken Powell.

==== September 1983 ====
September 4	Signed amateur free agent Gerónimo Berroa to a contract.

=== Roster ===
1983 Toronto Blue Jays
Roster
Pitchers: 31 Jim Acker; 47 Doyle Alexander; 18 Jim Clancy; 34 Stan Clarke; 36 Don Cooper; 35 Dave Geisel; 38 Jim Gott; 25 Roy Lee Jackson; 48 Luis Leal; 50 Joey McLaughlin; 17 Randy Moffitt; 30 Mike Morgan; 37 Dave Stieb; 45 Matt Williams	Catchers: 13 Buck Martinez; 14 Geno Petralli; 12 Ernie Whitt; Infielders: 1 Tony Fernández; 7 Dámaso García; 4 Alfredo Griffin; 16 Garth Iorg; 27 Mickey Klutts; 5 Rance Mulliniks; 26 Willie Upshaw	Outfielders: 29 Jesse Barfield; 11 George Bell; 9 Barry Bonnell; 10 Dave Collins; 15 Lloyd Moseby; 22 Hosken Powell; 23 Mitch Webster; Other batters: 44 Cliff Johnson; 33 Jorge Orta	Manager: 6 Bobby Cox; Coaches: 43 Cito Gaston; 8 John Sullivan; 41 Al Widmar; 24 Jimy Williams

=== Game log ===
1983 Game Log
April: 8–10 (Home: 4–4; Away: 4–6)

#	Date	Opponent	Score	Win	Loss	Save	Attendance	Record
1	April 5	@ Red Sox	7–1	Stieb (1–0)	Eckersley (0–1)	Jackson (1)	33,852	1–0
2	April 7	@ Red Sox	4–7	Stanley (1–0)	Leal (0–1)		9,603	1–1
3	April 9	Yankees	7–4	Jackson (1–0)	Gossage (0–1)		36,459	2–1
4	April 10	Yankees	0–3	Rawley (1–0)	Stieb (1–1)		23,093	2–2
5	April 12	Brewers	5–6	Sutton (1–1)	Morgan (0–1)	Easterly (1)	11,413	2–3
6	April 13	Brewers	7–2	Clancy (1–0)	Caldwell (0–2)		10,809	3–3
7	April 14	Brewers	4–5	Slaton (1–0)	McLaughlin (0–1)		10,127	3–4
8	April 15	@ Yankees	6–5	Stieb (2–1)	May (0–1)		15,092	4–4
--	April 16	@ Yankees	Postponed (rain) Rescheduled for August 8					
9	April 17	@ Yankees	5–7	Rawley (2–0)	Clancy (1–1)		50,200	4–5
10	April 18	@ Yankees	0–3	Guidry (1–1)	Leal (0–2)		11,148	4–6
11	April 19	Indians	9–7	Moffitt (1–0)	Spillner (0–1)		10,358	5–6
12	April 20	Indians	4–1	Stieb (3–1)	Sorensen (0–3)		10,173	6–6
13	April 22	@ Royals	5–6	Leonard (2–1)	Jackson (1–1)	Quisenberry (4)	16,172	6–7
14	April 23	@ Royals	5–4	Moffitt (2–0)	Quisenberry (1–1)	McLaughlin (1)	19,906	7–7
15	April 24	@ Royals	1–7	Renko (1–1)	Gott (0–1)		18,522	7–8
16	April 26	@ Rangers	1–2	Smithson (3–0)	Stieb (3–2)		17,380	7–9
17	April 27	@ Rangers	3–2	Moffitt (3–0)	Darwin (1–2)		7,518	8–9
18	April 29	White Sox	3–9	Dotson (3–1)	Leal (0–3)	Tidrow (2)	13,212	8–10
--	April 30	White Sox	Postponed (rain) Rescheduled for July 26					

May: 18–9 (Home: 12–6; Away: 6–3)

#	Date	Opponent	Score	Win	Loss	Save	Attendance	Record
19	May 1	White Sox	8–0	Stieb (4–2)	Bannister (1–4)		18,769	9–10
20	May 2	Rangers	6–5	Clancy (2–1)	Darwin (1–3)	Moffitt (1)	10,525	10–10
21	May 3	Rangers	2–7	Matlack (2–1)	Gott (0–2)	Tobik (3)	10,125	10–11
22	May 4	Rangers	7–1	Leal (1–3)	Honeycutt (3–2)		11,280	11–11
23	May 6	Royals	6–1	Stieb (5–2)	Gura (4–2)		12,699	12–11
24	May 7	Royals	7–4	Jackson (2–1)	Leonard (3–3)	Moffitt (2)	15,527	13–11
25	May 8	Royals	1–6	Renko (2–2)	Gott (0–3)	Quisenberry (7)	25,753	13–12
26	May 9	@ White Sox	6–1	Leal (2–3)	Burns (0–1)		9,848	14–12
27	May 11	@ White Sox	3–1 (10)	Stieb (6–2)	Hoyt (2–5)		18,844	15–12
28	May 12	@ Indians	6–3	Clancy (3–1)	Sorensen (2–5)	Moffitt (3)	6,361	16–12
29	May 13	@ Indians	1–5	Eichelberger (1–1)	Morgan (0–2)		10,900	16–13
30	May 14	@ Indians	8–1	Leal (3–3)	Blyleven (3–4)	Jackson (2)	15,505	17–13
--	May 15	@ Indians	Postponed (rain) Rescheduled for August 16					
31	May 16	@ Brewers	2–1 (11)	Stieb (7–2)	McClure (1–6)	Moffitt (4)	8,298	18–13
32	May 17	@ Brewers	6–9	Caldwell (3–4)	Clancy (3–2)	Tellmann (2)	9,304	18–14
33	May 18	@ Brewers	6–7	Slaton (5–0)	Geisel (0–1)		16,485	18–15
34	May 19	Orioles	1–2	McGregor (4–2)	Morgan (0–3)	Martinez (4)	11,569	18–16
35	May 20	Orioles	7–5	Gott (1–3)	Martínez (3–7)	McLaughlin (2)	16,034	19–16
36	May 21	Orioles	6–0	Stieb (8–2)	Stewart (2–2)		20,165	20–16
37	May 22	Orioles	5–0	Clancy (4–2)	Boddicker (1–1)		15,222	21–16
38	May 23	Tigers	4–0	Leal (4–3)	Wilcox (4–5)	Moffitt (5)	35,011	22–16
39	May 24	Tigers	7–6	Jackson (3–1)	Rucker (1–2)	McLaughlin (3)	19,105	23–16
40	May 25	Tigers	2–6	Petry (5–2)	Gott (1–4)	López (5)	15,846	23–17
41	May 26	Red Sox	2–7	Stanley (4–2)	Stieb (8–3)		16,589	23–18
42	May 27	Red Sox	0–2	Tudor (3–2)	Clancy (4–3)		17,161	23–19
43	May 28	Red Sox	9–5	Jackson (4–1)	Aponte (3–3)	McLaughlin (4)	30,171	24–19
44	May 29	Red Sox	6–1 (6)	Gott (2–4)	Eckersley (3–2)		33,352	25–19
--	May 29	Red Sox	Postponed (rain) Rescheduled for August 29					
45	May 30	@ Tigers	6–4 (10)	McLaughlin (1–1)	Gumpert (0–1)		10,901	26–19

June: 14–12 (Home: 6–3; Away: 8–9)

#	Date	Opponent	Score	Win	Loss	Save	Attendance	Record
46	June 1	@ Tigers	1–3	Rozema (2–0)	Clancy (4–4)	López (7)	9,586	26–20
47	June 2	@ Tigers	6–1	Leal (5–3)	Wilcox (5–6)		11,907	27–20
48	June 3	@ Orioles	2–3	Martinez (3–1)	McLaughlin (1–2)		40,393	27–21
49	June 4	@ Orioles	4–6	Boddicker (3–2)	Stieb (8–4)	Stewart (2)	22,659	27–22
50	June 5	@ Orioles	5–2	Clancy (5–4)	Davis (3–3)	McLaughlin (5)	20,953	28–22
51	June 6	@ Orioles	1–8 (6)	McGregor (7–3)	Leal (5–4)		16,649	28–23
52	June 7	@ Athletics	3–5	Conroy (1–1)	Gott (2–5)	Baker (3)	8,353	28–24
53	June 8	@ Athletics	5–2	Stieb (9–4)	Codiroli (4–5)	McLaughlin (6)	11,229	29–24
54	June 9	@ Athletics	1–3	Underwood (4–2)	Clancy (5–5)	Baker (4)	6,846	29–25
55	June 10	@ Angels	3–5	Brown (1–0)	Leal (5–5)		32,751	29–26
56	June 11	@ Angels	3–2	Gott (3–5)	Goltz (0–5)	Moffitt (6)	45,393	30–26
57	June 12	@ Angels	6–5 (15)	Clarke (1–0)	Brown (1–1)	Geisel (1)	32,587	31–26
58	June 14	Athletics	13–7	Jackson (5–1)	Underwood (4–3)		20,189	32–26
59	June 15	Athletics	1–10	Krueger (5–5)	Leal (5–6)		20,039	32–27
60	June 16	Athletics	9–1	Gott (4–5)	McCatty (1–1)		18,186	33–27
61	June 17	Angels	6–3	Stieb (10–4)	Travers (0–2)		31,586	34–27
62	June 18	Angels	6–7	Sánchez (7–2)	Clarke (1–1)		40,150	34–28
63	June 19	Angels	6–1	Leal (6–6)	Goltz (0–6)		36,098	35–28
64	June 20	Twins	2–1	Gott (5–5)	Davis (2–3)		19,267	36–28
65	June 21	Twins	8–3	Acker (1–0)	Oelkers (0–4)		23,473	37–28
66	June 22	Twins	3–4	Schrom (5–2)	Stieb (10–5)	Davis (10)	26,452	37–29
67	June 23	@ Mariners	5–4	Clancy (6–5)	Stanton (0–1)	McLaughlin (7)	6,303	38–29
68	June 24	@ Mariners	4–2	Leal (7–6)	Young (7–7)		6,389	39–29
69	June 25	@ Mariners	2–5	Beattie (5–5)	Gott (5–6)	Caudill (14)	15,048	39–30
70	June 26	@ Mariners	19–7	Acker (2–0)	Stoddard (4–10)		6,593	40–30
71	June 28	@ Twins	2–5	Schrom (6–2)	Stieb (10–6)	Davis (11)	12,844	40–31
72	June 29	@ Twins	4–2	Clancy (7–5)	Castillo (4–6)		8,242	41–31
73	June 30	@ Twins	11–3	Leal (8–6)	Williams (4–9)		20,498	42–31

July: 15–12 (Home: 8–8; Away: 7–4)

#	Date	Opponent	Score	Win	Loss	Save	Attendance	Record
74	July 1	Mariners	2–11	Beattie (6–5)	Gott (5–7)		36,572	42–32
75	July 2	Mariners	7–6	Jackson (6–1)	Caudill (1–5)		21,783	43–32
76	July 3	Mariners	1–4	Abbott (3–0)	Stieb (10–7)		32,161	43–33
--	July 4	Mariners	Postponed (rain) Rescheduled for September 19					
77	July 8	Rangers	8–5	Clancy (8–5)	Darwin (7–7)	Moffitt (7)	25,666	44–33
78	July 9	Rangers	5–1	Leal (9–6)	Hough (7–7)		26,234	45–33
79	July 10	Rangers	6–4	Stieb (11–7)	Honeycutt (11–5)	Moffitt (8)	32,071	46–33
80	July 11	@ Royals	7–4 (11)	Moffitt (4–0)	Creel (0–4)		32,415	47–33
81	July 12	@ Royals	9–6	Jackson (7–1)	Renko (5–7)		22,266	48–33
82	July 13	@ Royals	4–5	Gura (8–10)	Clancy (8–6)	Quisenberry (21)	32,352	48–34
83	July 14	@ White Sox	8–0	Leal (10–6)	Koosman (7–2)		17,883	49–34
84	July 15	@ White Sox	3–2	McLaughlin (2–2)	Dotson (8–6)		28,288	50–34
85	July 16	@ White Sox	7–5	McLaughlin (3–2)	Agosto (1–1)	Moffitt (9)	34,243	51–34
86	July 17	@ White Sox	2–3	Bannister (5–9)	Alexander (0–3)	Lamp (2)	30,140	51–35
87	July 18	Royals	8–2	Clancy (9–6)	Gura (8–11)		26,178	52–35
88	July 19	Royals	2–6	Black (4–3)	Leal (10–7)	Quisenberry (22)	36,459	52–36
89	July 20	Royals	8–14	Splittorff (8–3)	Stieb (11–8)	Quisenberry (23)	30,658	52–37
90	July 21	@ Rangers	2–3	Tanana (4–2)	Gott (5–8)		18,323	52–38
91	July 22	@ Rangers	10–5 (11)	Moffitt (5–0)	Schmidt (2–1)		28,075	53–38
92	July 23	@ Rangers	3–2	Clancy (10–6)	Darwin (7–10)		43,705	54–38
93	July 24	@ Rangers	0–3	Honeycutt (13–6)	Leal (10–8)		30,123	54–39
94	July 25	White Sox	4–7	Dotson (10–6)	Stieb (11–9)	Lamp (4)	24,394	54–40
95	July 26	White Sox	6–4	Gott (6–8)	Burns (5–6)	McLaughlin (8)		55–40
96	July 26	White Sox	3–4	Bannister (7–9)	Alexander (0–4)	Lamp (5)	33,554	55–41
97	July 27	White Sox	3–11	Hoyt (12–10)	Leal (10–9)		36,012	55–42
98	July 29	Indians	4–2	Clancy (11–6)	Sutcliffe (12–6)		18,020	56–42
99	July 30	Indians	6–5 (13)	McLaughlin (4–2)	Anderson (0–2)		23,445	57–42
100	July 31	Indians	11–16	Eichelberger (4–10)	Acker (2–1)	Anderson (2)	22,498	57–43

August: 15–19 (Home: 7–5; Away: 8–12)

#	Date	Opponent	Score	Win	Loss	Save	Attendance	Record
101	August 1	Indians	0–6	Barker (8–11)	Alexander (0–5)		20,781	57–44
102	August 2	Yankees	10–9 (10)	Jackson (8–1)	Murray (2–2)			58–44
103	August 2	Yankees	13–6	Williams (1–0)	Shirley (3–6)	Geisel (2)	45,102	59–44
104	August 3	Yankees	6–2	Clancy (12–6)	Guidry (12–7)		35,589	60–44
105	August 4	Yankees	1–3	Rawley (10–9)	Stieb (11–10)		36,684	60–45
106	August 5	@ Brewers	0–7	Haas (9–2)	Gott (6–9)		29,559	60–46
107	August 6	@ Brewers	0–3	Porter (4–5)	Alexander (0–6)		48,464	60–47
108	August 7	@ Brewers	6–9	Caldwell (9–8)	Leal (10–10)	Ladd (11)	47,300	60–48
109	August 8	@ Yankees	3–8	Guidry (13–7)	Clancy (12–7)			60–49
110	August 8	@ Yankees	3–11	Shirley (4–6)	Williams (1–1)	Frazier (4)	40,598	60–50
111	August 9	@ Yankees	8–0	Stieb (12–10)	Rawley (10–10)		35,221	61–50
112	August 10	@ Yankees	3–8	Righetti (13–3)	Gott (6–10)		40,377	61–51
113	August 11	Brewers	4–6	Porter (5–5)	Alexander (0–7)	Ladd (13)	27,620	61–52
114	August 12	Brewers	5–4	McLaughlin (5–2)	Slaton (9–5)		30,130	62–52
115	August 13	Brewers	3–1	Clancy (13–7)	McClure (9–9)	Geisel (3)	35,240	63–52
116	August 14	Brewers	4–3	Stieb (13–10)	Ladd (3–3)	McLaughlin (9)	42,240	64–52
117	August 15	@ Indians	3–2	Moffitt (6–0)	Spillner (1–8)		6,675	65–52
118	August 16	@ Indians	2–3	Easterly (2–1)	Moffitt (6–1)			65–53
119	August 16	@ Indians	9–6	McLaughlin (6–2)	Anderson (0–4)		9,666	66–53
120	August 17	@ Indians	6–5 (10)	McLaughlin (7–2)	Sutcliffe (13–9)	Jackson (3)	6,239	67–53
121	August 19	@ Red Sox	8–7	Acker (3–1)	Clear (3–5)	Jackson (4)	27,386	68–53
122	August 20	@ Red Sox	2–5	Eckersley (7–9)	Stieb (13–11)	Stanley (23)	29,173	68–54
123	August 21	@ Red Sox	7–3	Gott (7–10)	Hurst (9–10)		31,159	69–54
124	August 22	@ Red Sox	2–4	Ojeda (6–6)	Alexander (0–8)	Stanley (24)	26,351	69–55
125	August 23	@ Orioles	9–3	Leal (11–10)	Flanagan (7–3)		47,387	70–55
126	August 24	@ Orioles	4–7 (10)	Martinez (7–3)	McLaughlin (7–3)		25,882	70–56
127	August 25	@ Orioles	1–2 (10)	Martinez (8–3)	Jackson (8–2)		28,615	70–57
128	August 26	@ Tigers	3–4 (10)	López (8–5)	Gott (7–11)		46,467	70–58
129	August 27	@ Tigers	7–4	Alexander (1–8)	López (8–6)	Geisel (4)	39,118	71–58
130	August 28	@ Tigers	2–4	Morris (17–8)	McLaughlin (7–4)		38,332	71–59
131	August 29	Red Sox	5–1	Clancy (14–7)	Tudor (10–9)			72–59
132	August 29	Red Sox	7–8	Clear (4–5)	Moffitt (6–2)	Stanley (26)	38,338	72–60
133	August 30	Red Sox	4–5 (12)	Johnson (3–2)	Jackson (8–3)	Clear (4)	30,827	72–61
134	August 31	Orioles	2–10	Boddicker (12–6)	Gott (7–12)		37,127	72–62

September: 16–10 (Home: 10–5; Away: 6–5)

#	Date	Opponent	Score	Win	Loss	Save	Attendance	Record
135	September 1	Orioles	5–3	Alexander (2–8)	Palmer (3–4)		30,062	73–62
136	September 2	Tigers	8–9 (10)	López (9–7)	Gott (7–13)			73–63
137	September 2	Tigers	8–7	Acker (4–1)	Wilcox (8–9)	Geisel (5)	41,667	74–63
138	September 3	Tigers	4–7	Petry (15–8)	Clancy (14–8)	Martin (1)	35,268	74–64
139	September 4	Tigers	6–3 (10)	Stieb (14–11)	López (9–8)		43,158	75–64
140	September 5	Angels	7–0	Gott (8–13)	Zahn (8–11)		24,741	76–64
141	September 6	Angels	6–4	Alexander (3–8)	Curtis (1–2)	Acker (1)	19,176	77–64
142	September 7	Angels	6–9	Sánchez (9–7)	Geisel (0–2)		22,639	77–65
143	September 9	Athletics	5–7	McCatty (6–7)	Clancy (14–9)	Atherton (3)	20,336	77–66
144	September 10	Athletics	7–5	Stieb (15–11)	Underwood (8–7)	Moffitt (10)	26,434	78–66
145	September 11	Athletics	16–6	Gott (9–13)	Codiroli (12–11)		38,439	79–66
146	September 13	@ Mariners	6–4	Leal (12–10)	Stoddard (8–15)	Jackson (5)	4,340	80–66
147	September 14	@ Mariners	4–3	Alexander (4–8)	Thomas (3–1)		4,800	81–66
148	September 15	@ Twins	2–6	Schrom (13–7)	Stieb (15–12)		4,039	81–67
149	September 16	@ Twins	4–11	Lysander (5–12)	Gott (9–14)		11,640	81–68
150	September 17	@ Twins	13–3	Leal (13–10)	Pettibone (0–2)		6,300	82–68
151	September 19	Mariners	6–9	Young (11–14)	Geisel (0–3)	Vande Berg (5)	10,484	82–69
152	September 20	Mariners	7–3	Stieb (16–12)	Moore (5–8)		15,657	83–69
153	September 21	Mariners	4–3	Alexander (5–8)	Clark (7–9)		16,321	84–69
154	September 23	@ Athletics	0–2	Conroy (7–9)	Leal (13–11)		8,069	84–70
155	September 24	@ Athletics	1–2 (10)	Warren (4–3)	Clancy (14–10)		11,732	84–71
156	September 25	@ Athletics	8–6	Acker (5–1)	Atherton (2–5)		14,650	85–71
157	September 26	@ Angels	3–2 (10)	Alexander (6–8)	Lacey (0–2)	Jackson (6)	19,713	86–71
158	September 27	@ Angels	1–7	McLaughlin (2–4)	Leal (13–12)	Curtis (4)	20,559	86–72
159	September 28	@ Angels	5–3	Clancy (15–10)	Witt (7–14)	Jackson (7)	20,592	87–72
160	September 30	Twins	8–0	Stieb (17–12)	Viola (7–15)		18,501	88–72

October: 1–1 (Home: 1–1; Away: 0–0)

#	Date	Opponent	Score	Win	Loss	Save	Attendance	Record
161	October 1	Twins	4–3	Alexander (7–8)	Pettibone (0–4)		25,332	89–72
162	October 2	Twins	3–9	Williams (11–14)	Clancy (15–11)		40,692	89–73

== Player stats ==
=== Batting ===
==== Starters by position ====
Note: Pos = Position; G = Games played; AB = At bats; R = Runs scored; H = Hits; 2B = Doubles; 3B = Triples; Avg. = Batting average; HR = Home runs; RBI = Runs batted in; SB = Stolen bases

Pos	Player	G	AB	R	H	2B	3B	Avg.	HR	RBI	SB
C	Ernie Whitt	123	344	53	88	15	2	.256	17	56	1
1B	Willie Upshaw	160	579	99	177	26	7	.306	27	104	10
2B	Dámaso García	131	525	84	161	23	6	.307	3	38	31
3B	Rance Mulliniks	129	364	54	100	34	3	.275	10	49	0
SS	Alfredo Griffin	162	528	62	132	22	9	.250	4	47	8
LF	Dave Collins	118	402	55	109	12	4	.271	1	34	31
CF	Lloyd Moseby	151	539	104	170	31	7	.315	18	81	27
RF	Jesse Barfield	128	388	58	98	13	3	.253	27	68	2
DH	Cliff Johnson	142	407	59	108	23	1	.265	22	76	0

==== Other batters ====
Note: G = Games played; AB = At bats; R = Runs scored; H = Hits; 2B = Doubles; 3B = Triples; Avg. = Batting average; HR = Home runs; RBI = Runs batted in; SB = Stolen bases

Player	G	AB	R	H	2B	3B	Avg.	HR	RBI	SB
Barry Bonnell	121	377	49	120	21	3	.318	10	54	10
Garth Iorg	122	375	40	103	22	5	.275	2	39	7
Jorge Orta	103	245	30	58	6	3	.237	10	38	1
Buck Martinez	88	221	27	56	14	0	.253	10	33	0
George Bell	39	112	5	30	5	4	.268	2	17	1
Hosken Powell	40	83	6	14	0	0	.169	1	7	2
Mickey Klutts	22	43	3	11	0	0	.256	3	5	0
Tony Fernández	15	34	5	9	1	1	.265	0	2	0
Mitch Webster	11	11	2	2	0	0	.182	0	0	0
Geno Petralli	6	4	0	0	0	0	.000	0	0	0

=== Pitching ===
==== Starting pitchers ====
Note: G = Games pitched; GS = Games started; IP = Innings pitched; W = Wins; L = Losses; ERA = Earned run average; R = Runs allowed; ER = Earned runs allowed; BB = Walks allowed; K = Strikeouts

Player	G	GS	IP	W	L	ERA	R	ER	BB	K
Dave Stieb	36	36	278.0	17	12	3.04	105	94	93	187
Jim Clancy	34	34	223.0	15	11	3.91	115	97	61	99
Luis Leal	35	35	217.1	13	12	4.31	113	104	65	116
Jim Gott	34	30	176.2	9	14	4.74	103	93	68	121
Doyle Alexander	17	15	116.2	7	6	3.93	55	51	26	46
Matt Williams	4	3	8.0	1	1	14.63	13	13	7	5

==== Other pitchers ====
Note: G = Games pitched; GS = Games started; IP = Innings pitched; W = Wins; L = Losses; SV = Saves; ERA = Earned run average; R = Runs allowed; ER = Earned runs allowed; BB = Walks allowed; K = Strikeouts

Player	G	GS	IP	W	L	SV	ERA	R	ER	BB	K
Jim Acker	38	5	97.2	5	1	1	4.33	52	47	38	44
Mike Morgan	16	4	45.1	0	3	0	5.16	26	26	21	22

==== Relief pitchers ====
Note: G = Games pitched; IP = Innings pitched; W = Wins; L = Losses; SV = Saves; ERA = Earned run average; R = Runs allowed; ER = Earned runs allowed; BB = Walks allowed; K = Strikeouts

Player	G	IP	W	L	SV	ERA	R	ER	BB	K
Randy Moffitt	45	57.1	6	2	10	3.77	27	24	24	38
Joey McLaughlin	50	64.2	7	4	9	4.45	33	32	37	47
Roy Lee Jackson	49	92.0	8	3	7	4.50	48	46	41	48
Dave Geisel	47	52.1	0	3	5	4.64	28	27	31	50
Stan Clarke	10	11.0	1	1	0	3.27	4	4	5	7
Don Cooper	4	5.1	0	0	0	6.75	4	4	0	5

== Award winners ==
- Lloyd Moseby, Player of the Month Award, August
- Lloyd Moseby, Silver Slugger Award
- Dave Stieb, Pitcher of the Month Award, May

All-Star Game

- Dave Stieb, Starting Pitcher

== Farm system ==
Level	Team	League	Manager
AAA	Syracuse Chiefs	International League	Jim Beauchamp
AA	Knoxville Blue Jays	Southern League	John McLaren
A	Kinston Blue Jays	Carolina League	Ron Clark and Doug Ault
A	Florence Blue Jays	South Atlantic League	Dennis Holmberg
Rookie	GCL Blue Jays	Gulf Coast League	Epy Guerrero
Rookie	Medicine Hat Blue Jays	Pioneer League	Duane Larson
