= 1984 Chicago White Sox season =

1984 Chicago White Sox
- League: American League
- Division: West
- Ballpark: Comiskey Park
- City: Chicago
- Owners: Jerry Reinsdorf
- General managers: Roland Hemond
- Managers: Tony La Russa
- Television: WFLD; Sportsvision; ONTV (Don Drysdale, Ken Harrelson)
- Radio: WMAQ (AM) (Joe McConnell, Lorn Brown)

The 1984 Chicago White Sox season was the White Sox's 84th season in the major leagues, and their 85th season overall. They finished with a record of 74–88, good enough for fifth place in the American League West, 10 games behind the first place Kansas City Royals.

The Sox' 1984 season is most famous for a 25-inning game on May 8, 1984, against the Milwaukee Brewers. The game was suspended after 17 innings at 1 a.m. It was completed the following night, with the White Sox winning 7–6 on Harold Baines's walk-off home run.

== Offseason ==
- November 21, 1983: Fran Mullins was traded by the White Sox to the Cincinnati Reds for Steve Christmas.
- December 2, 1983: Jerry Koosman was signed as a free agent by the White Sox.
- December 5, 1983: The White Sox sent a player to be named later to the Philadelphia Phillies for Ron Reed. The White Sox completed the deal by sending Jerry Koosman to the Phillies on February 15, 1984
- December 5, 1983: Bert Roberge was signed as a free agent by the White Sox.
- January 20, 1984: Tom Seaver was chosen by the White Sox from the New York Mets as a free agent compensation pick.
- March 1, 1984: Jim Kern was released by the Chicago White Sox.
- March 27, 1984: Norberto Martin was signed by the White Sox as an amateur free agent.

== Regular season ==
- August 4, 1984: Bobby Meacham and Dale Berra of the New York Yankees were both tagged out at home by White Sox catcher Carlton Fisk.

=== Season standings ===
AL West
Team	W	L	Pct.	GB	Home	Road
Kansas City Royals	84	78	.519	—	44‍–‍37	40‍–‍41
California Angels	81	81	.500	3	37‍–‍44	44‍–‍37
Minnesota Twins	81	81	.500	3	47‍–‍34	34‍–‍47
Oakland Athletics	77	85	.475	7	44‍–‍37	33‍–‍48
Chicago White Sox	74	88	.457	10	43‍–‍38	31‍–‍50
Seattle Mariners	74	88	.457	10	42‍–‍39	32‍–‍49
Texas Rangers	69	92	.429	14½	34‍–‍46	35‍–‍46

=== Record vs. opponents ===
1984 American League record Sources:
Team	BAL	BOS	CAL	CWS	CLE	DET	KC	MIL	MIN	NYY	OAK	SEA	TEX	TOR
Baltimore	—	6–7	8–4	7–5	7–6	7–6	5–7	7–6	5–7	5–8	6–6	9–3	9–3	4–9
Boston	7–6	—	9–3	7–5	10–3	7–6	3–9	9–4	6–6	7–6	7–5	4–8	5–7	5–8
California	4–8	3–9	—	8–5	8–4	4–8	6–7	8–4	4–9	8–4	7–6	9–4	5–8	7–5
Chicago	5–7	5–7	5–8	—	8–4	4–8	5–8	7–5	8–5	7–5	6–7	5–8	5–8	4–8
Cleveland	6–7	3–10	4–8	4–8	—	4–9	6–6	9–4	7–5	2–11	7–5	8–4	9–3	6–7–1
Detroit	6–7	6–7	8–4	8–4	9–4	—	7–5	11–2	9–3	7–6	9–3	6–6	10–2	8–5
Kansas City	7–5	9–3	7–6	8–5	6–6	5–7	—	6–6	6–7	5–7	5–8	9–4	6–7	5–7
Milwaukee	6–7	4–9	4–8	5–7	4–9	2–11	6–6	—	5–7	6–7	4–8	6–6	5–6	10–3
Minnesota	7–5	6–6	9–4	5–8	5–7	3–9	7–6	7–5	—	8–4	8–5	7–6	8–5	1–11
New York	8–5	6–7	4–8	5–7	11–2	6–7	7–5	7–6	4–8	—	8–4	7–5	6–6	8–5
Oakland	6–6	5–7	6–7	7–6	5–7	3–9	8–5	8–4	5–8	4–8	—	8–5	8–5	4–8
Seattle	3–9	8–4	4–9	8–5	4–8	6–6	4–9	6–6	6–7	5–7	5–8	—	10–3	5–7
Texas	3–9	7–5	8–5	8–5	3–9	2–10	7–6	6–5	5–8	6–6	5–8	3–10	—	6–6
Toronto	9–4	8–5	5–7	8–4	7–6–1	5–8	7–5	3–10	11–1	5–8	8–4	7–5	6–6	—

=== Opening Day lineup ===
- Rudy Law, CF
- Carlton Fisk, C
- Harold Baines, RF
- Greg Luzinski, DH
- Tom Paciorek, 1B
- Ron Kittle, LF
- Vance Law, 3B
- Scott Fletcher, SS
- Julio Cruz, 2B
- LaMarr Hoyt, P

=== Notable transactions ===
- May 23, 1984: Jamie Quirk was signed as a free agent by the White Sox.
- June 21, 1984: The White Sox traded a player to be named later to the Cleveland Indians for Dan Spillner. The White Sox completed the trade by sending Jim Siwy to the Indians on June 26.
- July 18, 1984: Roy Smalley acquired by the White Sox from the New York Yankees for players to be named later. The White Sox sent Doug Drabek and Kevin Hickey to the New York Yankees to complete the trade on August 13.
- September 24, 1984: Jamie Quirk was purchased by the Indians from the White Sox.

=== Roster ===
1984 Chicago White Sox
Roster
Pitchers: 50 Juan Agosto; 24 Floyd Bannister; 30 Salomé Barojas; 59 Tom Brennan; 40 Britt Burns; 34 Richard Dotson; 37 Bob Fallon; 43 Jerry Don Gleaton; 31 LaMarr Hoyt; 49 Al Jones; 30 Gene Nelson; 28 Randy Niemann; 36 Ron Reed; 53 Bert Roberge; 41 Tom Seaver; 54 Jim Siwy; 37 Dan Spillner	Catchers: 58 Steve Christmas; 72 Carlton Fisk; 7 Marc Hill; 12 Joel Skinner; Infielders: 16 Julio Cruz; 20 Jerry Dybzinski; 1 Scott Fletcher; 32 Tim Hulett; 5 Vance Law; 26 Tom O'Malley; 44 Tom Paciorek; 13 Jamie Quirk; 12 Roy Smalley; 25 Mike Squires; 29 Greg Walker	Outfielders: 3 Harold Baines; 33 Daryl Boston; 17 Jerry Hairston; 42 Ron Kittle; 11 Rudy Law; 8 Dave Stegman; Other batters: 19 Greg Luzinski; 23 Casey Parsons	Manager: 10 Tony La Russa; Coaches: 46 Loren Babe (Died February 14); 35 Ed Brinkman; 18 Dave Duncan (Pitching); 15 Art Kusnyer (Bullpen); 6 Charley Lau (Hitting; died March 18); 21 Jim Leyland (Third base); 38 Dave Nelson; 14 Joe Nossek

== Game log ==
=== Regular season ===
1984 regular season game log: 74–88 (Home: 43–38; Away: 31–50)
April: 8–13 (Home: 5–6; Away: 3–7)

#	Date	Time (CT)	Opponent	Score	Win	Loss	Save	Time of Game	Attendance	Record	Box/ Streak
2	April 6	1:30 p.m. CST	Tigers	2–3	Wilcox (1–0)	**Dotson** (0–1)	Hernández (1)	2:51	42,692	1–1	L1
3	April 7	12:50 p.m. CST	Tigers	0–4	Morris (2–0)	**Bannister** (0–1)	–	2:44	24,616	1–2	L2
4	April 8	1:30 p.m. CST	Tigers	3–7	López (1–0)	**Seaver** (0–1)	–	3:17	20,478	1–3	L3
11	April 20	6:35 p.m. CST	@ Tigers	2–3	López (2–0)	**Reed** (0–1)	–	2:36	33,554	5–6	L1
12	April 21	1:15 p.m. CST	@ Tigers	1–4	Rozema (1–0)	**Hoyt** (2–1)	Bair (1)	2:35	34,395	5–7	L2
13	April 22	12:30 p.m. CST	@ Tigers	1–9	Berenguer (1–0)	**Brennan** (0–1)	–	2:58	10,603	5–8	L3

May: 14–13 (Home: 9–5; Away: 5–8)

#	Date	Time (CT)	Opponent	Score	Win	Loss	Save	Time of Game	Attendance	Record	Box/ Streak

June: 15–13 (Home: 10–6; Away: 5–7)

#	Date	Time (CT)	Opponent	Score	Win	Loss	Save	Time of Game	Attendance	Record	Box/ Streak

July: 13–15 (Home: 9–4; Away: 4–11)

#	Date	Time (CT)	Opponent	Score	Win	Loss	Save	Time of Game	Attendance	Record	Box/ Streak
78	July 2	7:20 p.m. CDT	Tigers	7–1	**Bannister** (5–6)	Rozema (4–1)	–	2:29	32,768	38–40	W1
79	July 3	7:30 p.m. CDT	Tigers	9–5	**Seaver** (7–6)	Morris (12–5)	**Reed** (4)	2:42	43,094	39–40	W2
80	July 4	6:05 p.m. CDT	Tigers	8–2	Dotson	Wilcox	–	2:34	37,665	40–40	W3
**55th All-Star Game in San Francisco, CA**
90	July 16	6:35 p.m. CDT	@ Tigers	1–7	Abbott (3–2)	**Hoyt** (8–10)	–	2:29	41,935	45–45	L2
91	July 17	6:35 p.m. CDT	@ Tigers	2–3	Petry (12–4)	**Nelson** (1–2)	Hernández (17)	2:03	34,579	45–46	L3
92	July 18	6:35 p.m. CDT	@ Tigers	10–6	**Bannister** (7–6)	Morris (12–6)	**Agosto** (3)	2:59	39,051	46–46	W1

August: 12–17 (Home: 3–9; Away: 9–8)

#	Date	Time (CT)	Opponent	Score	Win	Loss	Save	Time of Game	Attendance	Record	Box/ Streak

September: 12–17 (Home: 7–8; Away: 5–9)

#	Date	Time (CT)	Opponent	Score	Win	Loss	Save	Time of Game	Attendance	Record	Box/ Streak

Legend: = Win = Loss = Postponement
Bold = White Sox team member

== Player stats ==
=== Batting ===
Note: G = Games played; AB = At bats; R = Runs scored; H = Hits; 2B = Doubles; 3B = Triples; HR = Home runs; RBI = Runs batted in; BB = Base on balls; SO = Strikeouts; AVG = Batting average; SB = Stolen bases

Player	G	AB	R	H	2B	3B	HR	RBI	BB	SO	AVG	SB
Harold Baines, RF	147	569	72	173	28	10	29	94	54	75	.304	1
Floyd Bannister, P	1	1	0	0	0	0	0	0	0	0	.000	0
Daryl Boston, CF, RF	35	83	8	14	3	1	0	3	4	20	.169	6
Steve Christmas, C	12	11	1	4	1	0	1	4	0	2	.364	0
Julio Cruz, 2B	143	415	42	92	14	4	5	43	45	58	.222	14
Richard Dotson, PR	1	0	1	0	0	0	0	0	0	0	.000	0
Jerry Dybzinski, SS, 3B	94	132	17	31	5	1	1	10	13	12	.235	7
Carlton Fisk, C, DH	102	359	54	83	20	1	21	43	26	60	.231	6
Scott Fletcher, SS, 2B	149	456	46	114	13	3	3	35	46	46	.250	10
Jerry Hairston, OF, DH	115	227	41	59	13	2	5	19	41	29	.260	2
Marc Hill, C	77	193	15	45	10	1	5	20	9	26	.233	0
Tim Hulett, 2B, 3B	8	7	1	0	0	0	0	0	1	4	.000	1
Ron Kittle, LF, DH	139	446	67	100	15	0	32	74	49	137	.215	3
Rudy Law, CF, LF	136	487	68	122	14	7	6	37	39	42	.251	29
Vance Law, 3B, 2B	151	481	60	121	18	2	17	59	41	75	.252	4
Greg Luzinski, DH	125	412	47	98	13	0	13	58	56	80	.238	5
Tom O'Malley, 3B	12	16	0	2	0	0	0	3	0	5	.125	0
Tom Paciorek, OF, 1B	111	363	35	93	21	2	4	29	25	69	.256	6
Casey Parsons, OF	1	1	0	0	0	0	0	0	0	1	.000	0
Jamie Quirk, 3B	3	2	0	0	0	0	0	1	0	2	.000	0
Ron Reed, P	2	1	0	0	0	0	0	0	0	0	.000	0
Joel Skinner, C	43	80	4	17	2	0	0	3	7	19	.213	1
Roy Smalley, 3B	47	135	15	23	4	0	4	13	22	30	.170	1
Dan Spillner, PR	1	0	1	0	0	0	0	0	0	0	.000	0
Mike Squires, 1B, 3B	104	82	9	15	1	0	0	6	6	7	.183	2
Dave Stegman, OF, DH	55	92	13	24	1	2	2	11	4	18	.261	3
Greg Walker, 1B, DH	136	442	62	130	29	2	24	75	35	66	.294	8
Team totals	162	5513	679	1360	225	38	172	640	523	883	.247	109

=== Pitching ===
Note: W = Wins; L = Losses; ERA = Earned run average; G = Games pitched; GS = Games started; SV = Saves; IP = Innings pitched; H = Hits allowed; R = Runs allowed; ER = Earned runs allowed; HR = Home runs allowed; BB = Walks allowed; K = Strikeouts

Player	W	L	ERA	G	GS	SV	IP	H	R	ER	HR	BB	K
Juan Agosto	2	1	3.09	49	0	7	55.1	59	20	19	2	41	26
Floyd Bannister	14	11	4.83	34	33	0	218.0	211	127	117	30	82	152
Salome Barojas	3	2	4.58	24	0	1	39.1	48	24	20	3	20	18
Tom Brennan	0	1	4.05	4	1	0	6.2	8	5	3	1	3	3
Britt Burns	4	12	5.00	34	16	3	117.0	130	74	65	7	46	85
Richard Dotson	14	15	3.59	32	32	0	245.2	216	110	98	24	108	120
Bob Fallon	0	0	3.68	3	3	0	14.2	12	7	6	0	11	10
Jerry Don Gleaton	1	2	3.44	11	1	2	18.1	20	12	7	2	6	4
LaMarr Hoyt	13	18	4.47	34	34	0	235.2	244	127	117	31	46	126
Al Jones	1	1	4.43	20	0	5	20.1	23	10	10	3	11	15
Gene Nelson	3	5	4.46	20	9	1	74.2	72	38	37	9	17	36
Randy Niemann	0	0	1.68	5	0	0	5.1	5	1	1	0	6	5
Ron Reed	0	6	3.08	51	0	12	73.0	67	29	25	7	16	57
Bert Roberge	3	3	3.76	21	0	0	40.2	36	18	17	2	16	25
Tom Seaver	15	11	3.95	34	33	0	236.2	216	108	104	27	64	131
Jim Siwy	0	0	2.08	1	0	0	4.1	3	1	1	0	2	1
Dan Spillner	1	0	4.10	22	0	1	48.1	51	25	22	7	14	26
Mike Squires	0	0	0.00	1	0	0	0.1	0	0	0	0	0	0
Team totals	74	88	4.13	162	162	32	1454.1	1416	736	668	155	509	840

== Farm system ==
Level	Team	League	Manager
AAA	Denver Bears	American Association	Vern Law and Adrian Garrett
AA	Glens Falls White Sox	Eastern League	John Boles
A	Appleton Foxes	Midwest League	Sal Rende
A-Short Season	Niagara Falls Sox	New York–Penn League	Fred Nelson
Rookie	GCL White Sox	Gulf Coast League	Steve Dillard

LEAGUE CHAMPIONS: Appleton
