= 1983 Caribbean Series =

1983 baseball tournament

The twenty-fifth edition of the Caribbean Series (Serie del Caribe) was played in 1983. It was held from February 4 through February 9 with the champion teams from Dominican Republic (Tigres del Licey), Mexico (Tomateros de Culiacán), Puerto Rico (Lobos de Arecibo) and Venezuela (Tiburones de La Guaira). The format consisted of 12 games, each team facing the other teams twice. The games were played at Estadio Universitario in Caracas, Venezuela. Bowie Kuhn, the Commissioner of Major League Baseball, attended the Series, and the first pitch was thrown by Oscar Prieto, Leones del Caracas majority owner and one of the series brainchild.

== Summary ==
The Puerto Rico team was piloted by Ron Clark. After being mauled by the Dominicans in the opening, 17–2, Arecibo crushed the Mexicans 9-1 and defeated Venezuela, 7–6, in 11 innings. Later, a solid effort came from Kevin Hagen and Rich Bordi, both pitching complete games, to beat Mexico and the Dominican Republic. By beating Venezuela and Mexico in their last two games, the Lobos ended with a 5–1 mark en route to winning one of the most celebrated victories in Puerto Rican baseball history. Outfielder Glenn Walker was selected as Most Valuable Player and was chosen for the All-Star Team along Candy Maldonado and Dickie Thon. Other significant members of the roster included pitchers John Hobbs, Gary Lance and Edwin Núñez; catcher Orlando Mercado; infielders Ramón Avilés, Onix Concepción and Wayne Tolleson, as well as utilities Henry Cruz, Carmelo Martínez and Ken Phelps.

Venezuela, managed by Ozzie Virgil, finished in second place with a 4–2 record and also had the only shutout in the Series, by Rick Anderson, who limited the Mexicans to five hits while striking out nine. Second baseman Derrel Thomas paced the Tiburones offense, hitting .476 (10-for-21) to win the batting title and slugged .714. Other contributions came from right fielder Tony Armas (.269 BA, 3 HR, 6 RBI, .654 SLG), first baseman Ron Jackson (.360, 2 HR, 6 RBI, .680 SLG) and reliever Luis Aponte (1–0, one save, six SO in 6.0 innings of work). Other roster members included pitchers Bryan Clark, Luis Leal, Luis Sánchez, Albert Williams and Matt Young; catchers Bruce Bochy and Baudilio (Bo) Díaz; infielders Dave Concepción and Leo Hernández; outfielders Robert Marcano and Luis Salazar, and utilities Ozzie Guillén, Argenis Salazar and Manny Trillo.

The Dominican Republic, guided by Manny Mota, finished 3-3 and had to settle for a modest third place. The most prominent players were catcher Luis Pujols, third baseman Howard Johnson and outfielder César Gerónimo, who were included in the All-Star Team. Meanwhile, pitchers Alejandro Peña, Cliff Speck and David Grier got the victories. The Licey team also featured players such as Steve Baker (P), Tony Fernández (SS), Alfredo Griffin (2B), Pedro Guerrero (1B), Mike Howard (IF/OF), Rafael Landestoy (OF), Ted Martínez (IF), Orlando Peña (P) and Rafael Santana (IF).

Tomateros de Culiacán, led by catcher/manager Francisco Estrada, presented an All-Mexican squad which included local legends such as Cy Acosta (P), Salomé Barojas (P), Nelson Barrera (1B), Bobby Cuellar (P), Maximino León (P), Aurelio López (3B), Mario Mendoza (SS), Vicente Romo (P) and Jesús Sommers (DH). But the opportune hitting and strong defense were undermined by below average running speed and poor bullpen support. Mexico finished with a 0–6 record, to become the second winless team in Series history.

Final standings
Club	W	L	W/L %	GB
Puerto Rico Arecibo	5	1	.833	–
Venezuela La Guaira	4	2	.667	1.0
Dominican Republic Licey	3	3	.500	3.0
Mexico Culiacán	0	6	.000	5.0

Individual leaders
Player/Club	Statistic
Derrel Thomas / VEN	Batting average	.476
Tony Armas / VEN	Home runs	3
Howard Johnson / DOM	RBI	8
Candy Maldonado / PRI	Runs	8
Derrel Thomas / VEN	Hits	10
Eight tied	Doubles	2
Bo Díaz / VEN	Triples	1
Four tied	Stolen bases	1
Twelve tied	Wins	1
Rick Anderson / VEN; Odell Jones / VEN	Strikeouts	9
Rick Anderson / VEN	ERA	0.00
Three tied	Saves	1
Odell Jones / VEN	Innings pitched	11 2/3
Awards
Glenn Walker / PRI	Most Valuable Player
Ron Clark / PRI	Manager

All-Star Team
Name/Club	Position
Luis Pujols / DOM	catcher
Ron Jackson / VEN	first baseman
Derrel Thomas / VEN	second baseman
Howard Johnson / DOM	third baseman
Dickie Thon / PRI /	shortstop
Glenn Walker / PRI	left fielder
Candy Maldonado / PRI	center fielder
Tony Armas / VEN	right fielder
César Gerónimo / DOM	designated hitter
Rick Anderson / VEN	RH pitcher
Bryan Clark / VEN	LH pitcher
Ron Clark / PRI	manager

== Scoreboards ==
=== Game 1, February 4 ===
Team	1	2	3	4	5	6	7	8	9	R	H	E
Puerto Rico	0	0	0	0	0	0	0	2	0	2	7	3
Dominican Republic	4	4	0	0	0	1	0	8	X	17	16	0
WP: Alejandro Peña (1-0) LP: René Quiñones (0-1); Home runs: PUR: None; DOM: Howard Johnson 2 (2), Luis Pujols (1)

=== Game 2, February 4 ===
Team	1	2	3	4	5	6	7	8	9	R	H	E
Mexico	2	0	0	0	0	0	0	0	0	2	7	1
Venezuela	0	0	0	0	0	0	0	0	3	3	8	0
WP: Luis Aponte (1-0) LP: Antonio Pulido (0-1); Home runs: MEX: None; VEN: Ron Jackson (1)

=== Game 3, February 5 ===
Team	1	2	3	4	5	6	7	8	9	R	H	E
Dominican Republic	0	4	0	2	0	0	0	2	1	9	10	1
Mexico	0	0	0	0	0	0	0	0	1	1	7	1
WP: Cliff Speck (1-0) LP: Ernesto Escárrega (0-1); Home runs: DOM: Tony Fernández (1), Luis Pujols (2); MEX: None

=== Game 4, February 5 ===
Team	1	2	3	4	5	6	7	8	9	10	11	R	H	E
Venezuela	1	1	2	0	0	0	2	0	0	0	0	6	11	1
Puerto Rico	2	0	0	2	0	0	0	0	2	0	1	7	14	3
WP: Gary Lance (1-0) LP: Luis Sánchez (0-1); Home runs: VEN: Tony Armas (1); PUR: Carmelo Martínez (1)

=== Game 5, February 6 ===
Team	1	2	3	4	5	6	7	8	9	R	H	E
Dominican Republic	0	0	0	1	0	1	0	0	0	2	6	1
Venezuela	2	0	0	1	0	0	0	0	X	3	9	0
WP: Bryan Clark (1-0) LP: Steve Baker (0-1) Sv: Albert Williams (1)

=== Game 6, February 6 ===
Team	1	2	3	4	5	6	7	8	9	R	H	E
Puerto Rico	0	0	0	0	0	0	0	2	0	2	8	0
Mexico	0	1	0	0	0	0	0	0	0	1	5	0
WP: Kevin Hagen (1-0) LP: Alejo Ahumada (0-1)

=== Game 7, February 7 ===
Team	1	2	3	4	5	6	7	8	9	R	H	E
Dominican Republic	0	0	3	0	0	0	0	1	0	4	10	1
Puerto Rico	4	0	0	0	1	0	2	0	X	7	5	0
WP: Rich Bordi (1-0) LP: Jim Siwy (0-1); Home runs: DOM: None; PUR: Glenn Walker (1), Dickie Thon (1)

=== Game 8, February 7 ===
Team	1	2	3	4	5	6	7	8	9	R	H	E
Venezuela	0	3	0	0	1	1	0	0	0	5	7	0
Mexico	0	0	0	0	0	0	0	0	0	0	5	0
WP: Rick Anderson (1-0) LP: Mercedes Esquer (0-1); Home runs: VEN: Ron Jackson (2); MEX: None

=== Game 9, February 8 ===
Team	1	2	3	4	5	6	7	8	9	R	H	E
Mexico	0	0	3	0	0	1	0	1	1	6	7	2
Dominican Republic	0	0	3	0	5	4	0	1	X	13	12	0
WP: David Grier (1-0) LP: Vicente Romo (0-1); Home runs: MEX: Ricardo Guerra (1), Jesús Sommers (1); DOM: None

=== Game 10, February 8 ===
Team	1	2	3	4	5	6	7	8	9	R	H	E
Puerto Rico	0	1	1	0	2	1	0	0	0	5	13	1
Venezuela	0	0	0	1	0	0	0	2	0	3	7	1
WP: Jesús Hernáiz (1-0) LP: Odell Jones (0-1) Sv: Gary Lance (1); Home runs: PUR: Glenn Walker (2), Jesús Vega 2 (2); VEN: Tony Armas (2)

=== Game 11, February 9 ===
Team	1	2	3	4	5	6	7	8	9	R	H	E
Mexico	0	0	1	0	5	0	0	0	0	6	10	3
Puerto Rico	0	2	2	0	2	5	0	0	X	11	11	0
WP: Keith Creal (1-0) LP: Maximino León (0-1); Home runs: MEX: Nelson Barrera (1); PUR: Candy Maldonado (1)

=== Game 12, February 9 ===
Team	1	2	3	4	5	6	7	8	9	R	H	E
Venezuela	3	1	2	0	0	0	1	0	0	7	11	0
Dominican Republic	0	3	1	1	1	0	0	0	0	6	13	2
WP: Matt Young (1-0) LP: Joe Beckwith (0-1) Sv: Luis Aponte (1); Home runs: VEN: Tony Armas (3); DOM: Pedro Guerrero (1), Pedro Hernández (1)

== See also ==
- Ballplayers who have played in the Series

== Sources ==
- Antero Núñez, José. Series del Caribe. Impresos Urbina, Caracas, Venezuela
- Araujo Bojórquez, Alfonso. Series del Caribe: Narraciones y estadísticas, 1949-2001. Colegio de Bachilleres del Estado de Sinaloa, Mexico
- Figueredo, Jorge S. Cuban Baseball: A Statistical History, 1878 - 1961. Macfarland & Co., United States
- González Echevarría, Roberto. The Pride of Havana. Oxford University Express
- Gutiérrez, Daniel. Enciclopedia del Béisbol en Venezuela, Caracas, Venezuela
