= 1985 Caribbean Series =

1985 baseball tournament

The twenty-seventh edition of the Caribbean Series (Serie del Caribe) of baseball was played in 1985. It was held from February 2 through February 7 with the champion teams from Dominican Republic (Tigres del Licey), Mexico (Tomateros de Culiacán), Puerto Rico (Metropolitanos de San Juan) and Venezuela (Tiburones de la Guaira). The format consisted of 12 games, each team facing the other teams twice. The games were played at Estadio Teodoro Mariscal in Mazatlán, Mexico.

== Summary ==
The Dominican Republic team won the Series with a 5-1 record and was managed by Terry Collins. Their only defeat came from Mexico. The champions got fine offensive performances from 1B Glenn Davis and OF George Bell, while the pitching staff was led by José Rijo, who posted three saves and did not allow an earned run in six innings of work, to earn Series MVP honors. Other contributions came from pitchers Tom Brennan (2-0, 1.59 ERA), Salomón Torres (a four-hit shutout) and Burt Hooton (1-0, seven SO). Also in the roster were Ralph Bryant, Braulio Castillo, Tony Fernández, David Green, Luis Pujols, Julio Solano and José Uribe.

Managed by catcher Francisco Estrada, Mexico finished in second place with a 3-3 mark. 2B Juan Navarrete hit .533 to win the batting title while 3B Nelson Barrera led the Series hitters with seven RBI. The Mexican team also featured players such as Derek Bryant, Lorenzo Bundy, Houston Jiménez, Chris Jones, Aurelio López, Sid Monge, Junior Moore and Vicente Romo.

Puerto Rico and Venezuela tied for third place with a 2-4 record.

The Puerto Rican team, with Mako Oliveras at the helm, was a huge favorite to win the Series, thanks to a roster loaded with prominent players like Juan Agosto, Luis Aguayo, Iván Calderón, Henry Cotto, Jesús Hernáiz, Carmelo Martínez, Edgar Martínez, José Oquendo, Luis Rosado, Orlando Sánchez, Benito Santiago, Candy Sierra and Rubén Sierra, but the team faded just after the first half. The team's only victories came behind strong pitching efforts from Francisco Oliveras and José Guzmán, who threw complete games against Mexico and Venezuela.

Aurelio Monteagudo managed the Venezuelan club, which was characterized by a fairly average pitching staff and really poor hitting. A modest contribution came from pitcher Bryan Clark (1-0, nine SO in seven innings) and infielders Pat Dodson (.429 SLG) and Luis Salazar (.474 SLG, five RBI). Other members of the team included Bob Fallon, Ozzie Guillén, Gorman Heimueller, Luis Leal, Fred Manrique, Eddie Miller, Alfredo Pedrique, Gustavo Polidor and Argenis Salazar.

Final standings
| Club | W | L | W/L % | GB |
| Dominican Republic | 5 | 1 | .833 | – |
| Mexico | 3 | 3 | .500 | 2.0 |
| Venezuela | 2 | 4 | .333 | 3.0 |
| Puerto Rico | 2 | 4 | .333 | 3.0 |

Individual leaders
| Player/Club | Statistic |
| Juan Navarrete / MEX | Batting average | .533 |
| Glenn Davis / DOM | Home runs | 3 |
| Nelson Barrera / MEX | RBI | 7 |
| George Bell / DOM | Runs | 5 |
| Juan Navarrete / MEX | Hits | 9 |
| Three tied | Doubles | 2 |
| Three tied | Triples | 1 |
| George Bell / DOM | Stolen bases | 3 |
| Tom Brennan / DOM | Wins | 2 |
| Tom Brennan / DOM | Strikeouts | 12 |
| Salomón Torres / DOM | ERA | 0.00 |
| José Rijo / DOM | Saves | 1 |
| Luis Trinidad Castillo / MEX | Innings pitched | 15.0 |
Awards
| José Rijo / DOM | Most Valuable Player |
| Terry Collins / DOM | Manager |

All-Star Team
| Name/Club | Position |
| Francisco Estrada / MEX | catcher |
| Glenn Davis / DOM | first baseman |
| Juan Navarrete / MEX | second baseman |
| Nelson Barrera / MEX | third baseman |
| Alfonso Jiménez / MEX | shortstop |
| George Bell / DOM | left fielder |
| Chris Jones / MEX | center fielder |
| David Green / DOM | right fielder |
| Orlando Sánchez / PRI | designated hitter |
| Luis Trinidad Castillo / MEX | RH pitcher |
| Bryan Clark / VEN | LH pitcher |
| José Rijo / DOM | relief pitcher |
| Terry Collins / DOM | manager |

== Scoreboards ==
=== Game 1, February 2 ===
| Team | 1 | 2 | 3 | 4 | 5 | 6 | 7 | 8 | 9 | R | H | E |
|---|---|---|---|---|---|---|---|---|---|---|---|---|
| Venezuela | 0 | 0 | 1 | 0 | 0 | 0 | 0 | 1 | 0 | 2 | 5 | 0 |
| Dominican Republic | 0 | 1 | 0 | 0 | 0 | 1 | 2 | 0 | X | 4 | 7 | 1 |
WP: Tom Brennan (1-0) LP: Luis Leal (0-1) Sv: José Rijo (1); Home runs: VEN: None; DOM: Glenn Davis 2 (2), George Bell (1), Ralph Bryant (1)

=== Game 2, February 2 ===
| Team | 1 | 2 | 3 | 4 | 5 | 6 | 7 | 8 | 9 | R | H | E |
|---|---|---|---|---|---|---|---|---|---|---|---|---|
| Puerto Rico | 1 | 0 | 1 | 0 | 3 | 0 | 0 | 0 | 0 | 5 | 9 | 1 |
| Mexico | 0 | 0 | 0 | 0 | 0 | 0 | 0 | 0 | 4 | 4 | 7 | 0 |
WP: Francisco Oliveras (1-0) LP: Enrique Huerta (0-1); Home runs: PRI: Carmelo Martínez 2 (2); MEX: None

=== Game 3, February 3 ===
| Team | 1 | 2 | 3 | 4 | 5 | 6 | 7 | 8 | 9 | R | H | E |
|---|---|---|---|---|---|---|---|---|---|---|---|---|
| Venezuela | 0 | 0 | 0 | 3 | 0 | 0 | 0 | 0 | 0 | 3 | 8 | 1 |
| Puerto Rico | 1 | 1 | 0 | 0 | 4 | 0 | 0 | 0 | X | 6 | 10 | 2 |
WP: José Guzmán (1-0) LP: Bob Fallon (0-1)

=== Game 4, February 3 ===
| Team | 1 | 2 | 3 | 4 | 5 | 6 | 7 | 8 | 9 | R | H | E |
|---|---|---|---|---|---|---|---|---|---|---|---|---|
| Mexico | 7 | 1 | 0 | 0 | 2 | 1 | 0 | 0 | 0 | 11 | 14 | 0 |
| Dominican Republic | 0 | 0 | 0 | 0 | 0 | 0 | 0 | 0 | 0 | 0 | 4 | 1 |
WP: Luis Castillo (1-0) LP: Jeff Kaiser (0-1); Home runs: MEX: Nelson Barrera (1); DOM: None

=== Game 5, February 4 ===
| Team | 1 | 2 | 3 | 4 | 5 | 6 | 7 | 8 | 9 | R | H | E |
|---|---|---|---|---|---|---|---|---|---|---|---|---|
| Dominican Republic | 0 | 0 | 0 | 0 | 1 | 1 | 0 | 1 | 0 | 3 | 10 | 0 |
| Puerto Rico | 0 | 0 | 0 | 0 | 0 | 0 | 0 | 0 | 0 | 0 | 4 | 0 |
WP: Mike Torrez (1-0) LP: Jesús Hernáiz (0-1) Sv: José Rijo (2); Home runs: DOM: George Bell (2); PRI: None

=== Game 6, February 4 ===
| Team | 1 | 2 | 3 | 4 | 5 | 6 | 7 | 8 | 9 | R | H | E |
|---|---|---|---|---|---|---|---|---|---|---|---|---|
| Mexico | 0 | 1 | 0 | 0 | 1 | 3 | 0 | 1 | 1 | 7 | 13 | 1 |
| Venezuela | 0 | 0 | 0 | 0 | 0 | 0 | 4 | 1 | 0 | 5 | 7 | 4 |
WP: Aurelio López (1-0) LP: Fred Toliver (0-1) Sv: Alfonso Pulido (1); Home runs: MEX: Lorenzo Bundy (1); VEN: None

=== Game 7, February 5 ===
| Team | 1 | 2 | 3 | 4 | 5 | 6 | 7 | 8 | 9 | R | H | E |
|---|---|---|---|---|---|---|---|---|---|---|---|---|
| Dominican Republic | 0 | 0 | 0 | 1 | 4 | 0 | 0 | 0 | 0 | 5 | 10 | 1 |
| Venezuela | 0 | 0 | 0 | 3 | 0 | 0 | 0 | 0 | 0 | 3 | 9 | 1 |
WP: Burt Hooton (1-0) LP: Gorman Heimueller (0-1) Sv: Julio Solano (1)

=== Game 8, February 5 ===
| Team | 1 | 2 | 3 | 4 | 5 | 6 | 7 | 8 | 9 | 10 | 11 | R | H | E |
|---|---|---|---|---|---|---|---|---|---|---|---|---|---|---|
| Mexico | 0 | 0 | 0 | 0 | 0 | 0 | 0 | 0 | 1 | 0 | 3 | 4 | 8 | 1 |
| Puerto Rico | 0 | 0 | 0 | 0 | 0 | 1 | 0 | 0 | 0 | 0 | 0 | 1 | 8 | 0 |
WP: Aurelio López (2-0) LP: Candy Sierra (0-1)

=== Game 9, February 6 ===
| Team | 1 | 2 | 3 | 4 | 5 | 6 | 7 | 8 | 9 | 10 | 11 | 12 | 13 | R | H | E |
|---|---|---|---|---|---|---|---|---|---|---|---|---|---|---|---|---|
| Puerto Rico | 0 | 0 | 0 | 0 | 0 | 0 | 1 | 1 | 0 | 0 | 0 | 0 | 0 | 2 | 8 | 3 |
| Venezuela | 0 | 0 | 0 | 0 | 0 | 0 | 0 | 2 | 0 | 0 | 0 | 0 | 1 | 3 | 15 | 2 |
WP: Luis Lunar (1-0) LP: Jorge Ojeda (0-1); Home runs: PRI: Orlando Sánchez (1); VEN: Pat Dodson (1)

=== Game 10, February 6 ===
| Team | 1 | 2 | 3 | 4 | 5 | 6 | 7 | 8 | 9 | R | H | E |
|---|---|---|---|---|---|---|---|---|---|---|---|---|
| Dominican Republic | 0 | 0 | 0 | 0 | 0 | 1 | 1 | 0 | 2 | 4 | 8 | 0 |
| Mexico | 0 | 1 | 0 | 0 | 0 | 0 | 0 | 0 | 0 | 1 | 9 | 2 |
WP: Scott Fuller (1-0) LP: Juan Colorado (0-1) Sv: José Rijo (3); Home runs: DOM: David Green (1); MEX: None

=== Game 11, February 7 ===
| Team | 1 | 2 | 3 | 4 | 5 | 6 | 7 | 8 | 9 | R | H | E |
|---|---|---|---|---|---|---|---|---|---|---|---|---|
| Puerto Rico | 0 | 0 | 0 | 0 | 0 | 0 | 1 | 0 | 0 | 1 | 5 | 1 |
| Dominican Republic | 0 | 0 | 0 | 6 | 0 | 2 | 0 | 0 | X | 8 | 9 | 0 |
WP: Tom Brennan (2-0) LP: José Guzmán (1-1); Home runs: PRI: Orlando Sánchez (2); DOM: Luis Pujols (1), Glenn Davis (3), Braulio Castillo (1)

=== Game 12, February 7 ===
| Team | 1 | 2 | 3 | 4 | 5 | 6 | 7 | 8 | 9 | R | H | E |
|---|---|---|---|---|---|---|---|---|---|---|---|---|
| Venezuela | 0 | 3 | 0 | 0 | 0 | 3 | 1 | 0 | 0 | 7 | 9 | 0 |
| Mexico | 0 | 0 | 0 | 0 | 0 | 3 | 0 | 1 | 0 | 4 | 9 | 1 |
WP: Bryan Clark (1-0) LP: Luis Trinidad Castillo (1-1) Sv: Bob Fallon (1); Home runs: VEN: Luis Salazar (1), Antonio Córdova (1); MEX: None

== See also ==
- Ballplayers who have played in the Series

== Sources ==
- Antero Núñez, José. Series del Caribe. Impresos Urbina, Caracas, Venezuela.
- Araujo Bojórquez, Alfonso. Series del Caribe: Narraciones y estadísticas, 1949-2001. Colegio de Bachilleres del Estado de Sinaloa, Mexico.
- Figueredo, Jorge S. Cuban Baseball: A Statistical History, 1878 - 1961. Macfarland & Co., United States.
- González Echevarría, Roberto. The Pride of Havana. Oxford University Express.
- Gutiérrez, Daniel. Enciclopedia del Béisbol en Venezuela, Caracas, Venezuela.
