= Armbrister =

Armbrister is a surname. Notable people with the surname include:

- Cache Armbrister (born 1989), Bahamian sprinter of Jamaican descent
- Ed Armbrister (1948–2021), Bahamian baseball player
- Ken Armbrister (born 1946), American politician
- Thurston Armbrister (born 1992), American football player
