= Bill Lindsey =

American baseball player (born 1960)

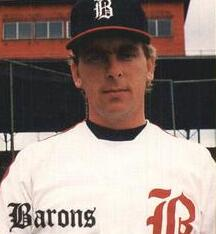
- Lindsey with the Birmingham Barons c. 1987
- Catcher
- Born: April 12, 1960 (age 66); Staten Island, New York, U.S.
- Batted: Right Threw: Right

MLB debut
- July 18, 1987, for the Chicago White Sox

Last MLB appearance
- August 18, 1987, for the Chicago White Sox

MLB statistics
- Batting average: .188
- Runs: 2
- Hits: 3
- Stats at Baseball Reference

Teams
- Chicago White Sox (1987)

William Donald Lindsey (born April 12, 1960) is an American former professional baseball catcher. He played during one season at the major league level for the Chicago White Sox of Major League Baseball (MLB).

== Career ==
Lindsey played baseball at Hollywood Hills High School in Hollywood, Florida where he was teammates with Bob Fallon, who would also go on to play for the White Sox.

Lindsey signed with the New York Yankees as an amateur free agent in 1981. Lindsey debut professionally that summer with their Rookie league Paintsville Yankees in 1981. On May 4, 1984, while playing for the Nashville Sounds, the Yankees' Double-A affiliate, Lindsey caught a no-hitter by batterymate Jim Deshaies.

After the 1986 season, the Yankees sent Lindsey to the Chicago White Sox as the player to be named later, completing a trade that summer that sent Ron Kittle, Joel Skinner, and Wayne Tolleson to New York for Ron Hassey and Carlos Martínez.

Lindsey played in nine games for the White Sox in 1987, starting five of them. He batted 3-for-16 with two runs scored, one RBI, and three strikeouts. In his one month in the majors, he backed up future Hall of Famer Carlton Fisk as regular backup Hassey was injured.

After ending his playing career, Lindsey sold cars in Margate, Florida. In 1995, he was a replacement player in spring training for the White Sox during the ongoing strike.
