= Estadio Cruz Azul Nelson Barrera =

Stadium in Campeche, Mexico

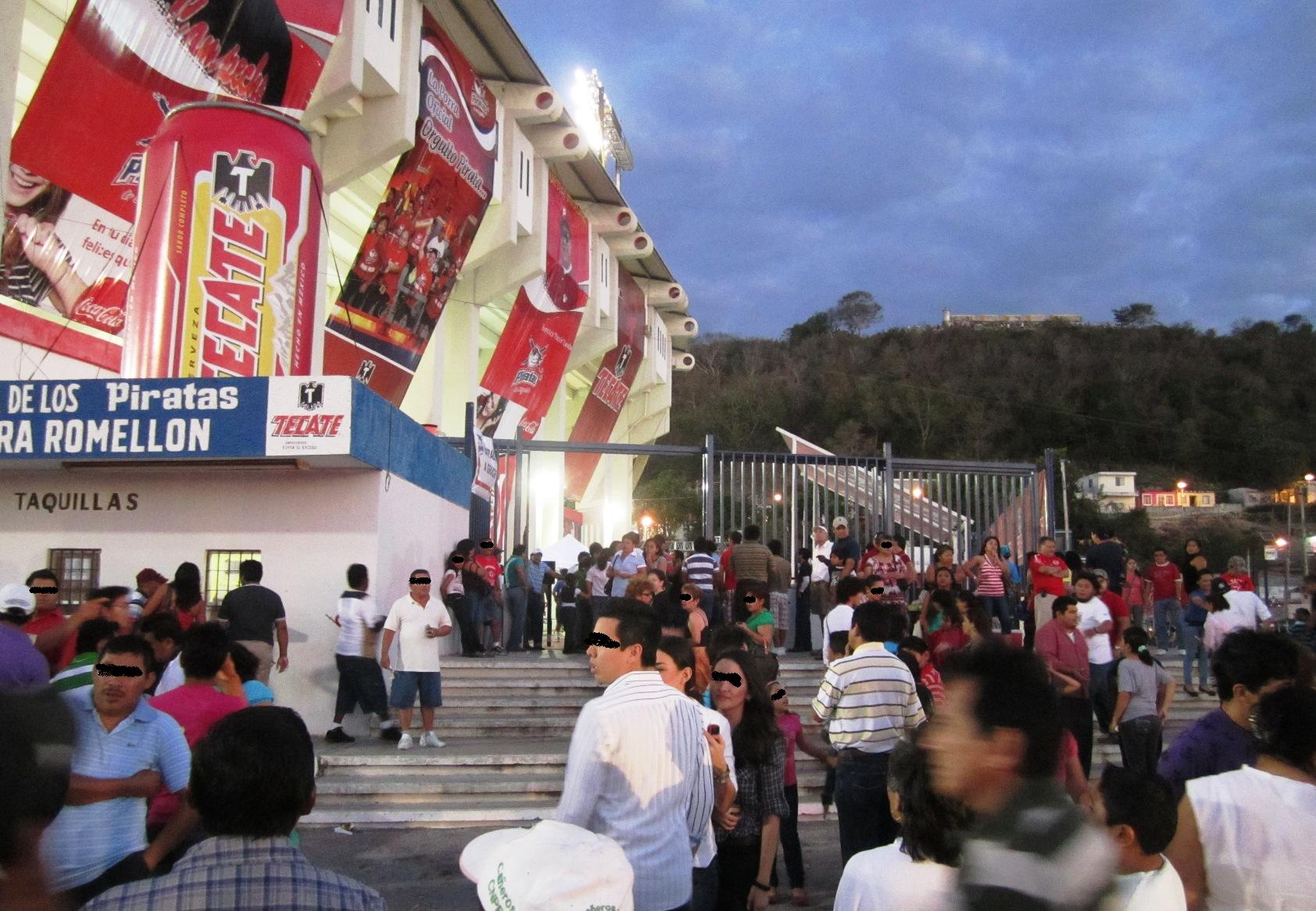
- Interactive map of Estadio Cruz Azul Nelson Barrera
- Former names: Estadio Venustiano Carranza (1980–1997)
- Location: Filiberto no.2 Qui Col. Farfán Camino Real; Campeche, Campeche, Mexico.
- Coordinates: 19°50′44.87″N 90°31′0.86″W
- Capacity: 4,190
- Field size: Left Field: 330 feet (100 m); Center Field: 400 feet (120 m); Right Field: 330 feet (100 m)

Construction
- Opened: 22 May 2001

Tenant
- Piratas de Campeche

Estadio Nelson Barrera, also referred to as Estadio Cruz Azul Nelson Barrera for sponsorship reasons, is a stadium in Campeche, Mexico. It is primarily used for baseball, and is the home field of the Piratas de Campeche (Campeche Pirates) Mexican League baseball team. It holds 4,190 people. It is named for Campeche native and Mexican League home run and RBI record setter Nelson Barrera. It was built in the same location as the former Estadio Venustiano Carranza (originally built 28 December 1958), which served as the Pirates' home field from 1980 through 1997. From 1998 through 2000, the Pirates played at the 3,000-seat Estadio Leandro Dominguez in the Santa Lucia neighborhood of the city of Campeche. Estadio Nelson Barrera Romellón opened on 22 May 2001 with a Pirates victory over the visiting Olmecas de Tabasco.
