= Josh Samuda =

American football player (born 1988)

Joshua Samuda
No. 64
- Position: Guard

Personal information
- Born: December 23, 1988 (age 37); Birmingham, England
- Listed height: 6 ft 4 in (1.93 m)
- Listed weight: 315 lb (143 kg)

Career information
- High school: Hollywood Hills (Hollywood, Florida, U.S.)
- College: Massachusetts
- NFL draft: 2012: undrafted

Career history
- Miami Dolphins (2012); Minnesota Vikings (2014)

Career NFL statistics
- Games played: 16
- Stats at Pro Football Reference

Joshua Samuda (born December 23, 1988) is a former American football offensive guard. He played college football at Massachusetts.

== College career ==
He played college football at Massachusetts. During his four years in Massachusetts, He played a total of 45 games. In 2009, he was selected to the 2009 College Sporting News Preseason First-team All-American. He was selected to the 2010 Phil Steele Preseason Second-team All-CAA.

== Professional career ==
=== Miami Dolphins ===
On May 4, 2012, he signed with the Miami Dolphins as an Undrafted free agent. He was waived before the first game of the 2013 NFL season.

=== Minnesota Vikings ===
On January 3, 2014, he signed with the Minnesota Vikings. He was released on May 13, 2014.
