= Gary Lance =

American baseball player (born 1948)

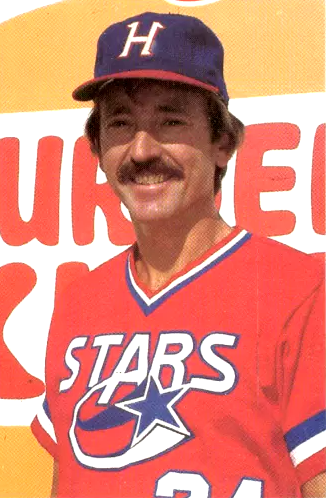
- Lance as a coach with the Huntsville Stars c. 1985
- Pitcher
- Born: September 21, 1948 (age 78); Greenville, South Carolina, U.S.
- Batted: Switch Threw: Right

MLB debut
- September 28, 1977, for the Kansas City Royals

Last MLB appearance
- September 28, 1977, for the Kansas City Royals

MLB statistics
- Win–loss record: 0–1
- Earned run average: 4.50
- Innings pitched: 2
- Stats at Baseball Reference

Teams
- Kansas City Royals (1977)

Gary Dean Lance (born September 21, 1948) is a former baseball pitcher. He played briefly for the Kansas City Royals of Major League Baseball (MLB) in its 1977 season. Listed at 6' 3", 195 lb., Lance batted and threw right handed. He was born in Greenville, South Carolina and attended Dentsville High School in Columbia, SC and continued playing baseball for University of South Carolina.

== Career ==
The Royals signed Lance as a free agent in 1971. He spent six seasons in the minor leagues playing at six different levels.

In 1973, while pitching for the Double-A Jacksonville Suns, Lance hurled a no-hitter against the Birmingham A's. He averaged 12 wins in four of these seasons, with a career-high 16 victories in 1977, before joining the big team late in the year.

Lance debuted with Kansas City on September 28, 1977, pitching two innings of relief against the Oakland Athletics. He came into the game in the 8th inning to replace Mark Littell, after the A's had tied the game at 5–5. Lance got the last out of the inning, pitched a scoreless 9th, then gave up the winning run in the 10th to take the loss. He never appeared in a major league game again.

Lance returned to the minors for three more years, retiring in 1980. He posted an 80–72 record with a 3.75 ERA in 10 minor league seasons.

Following his playing career, Lance spent many years as a minor league pitching coach, most recently with the Portland Beavers in 2007.

In between, Lance played winter ball in Venezuela with the Tiburones de La Guaira and Tigres de Aragua clubs, as well as in Puerto Rico for the Lobos de Arecibo, Indios de Mayagüez and Vaqueros de Bayamón. While pitching for Arecibo, he was a member of the 1983 Caribbean Series champion team.

Lance made a short return in 1990, while pitching for the Florida Tropics of the short-lived Senior Professional Baseball Association.
