= Jim Siwy =

American baseball player (born 1958)

- Pitcher
- Born: September 20, 1958 (age 67); Pawtucket, Rhode Island, U.S.
- Batted: Right Threw: Right

MLB debut
- August 20, 1982, for the Chicago White Sox

Last MLB appearance
- May 12, 1984, for the Chicago White Sox

MLB statistics
- Innings pitched: 11 1/3
- Earned run average: 7.15
- Strikeouts: 4
- Stats at Baseball Reference

Teams
- Chicago White Sox (1982, 1984)

Jim Siwy
- Police career
- Country: United States
- Department: Las Vegas Metropolitan Police Department
- Service years: 1989 - 2012
- Rank: Sworn in as Officer, 1989; Sergeant

James Gerard Siwy (/ˈsiwi/ SEE-wee; born September 20, 1958) is an American former Major League Baseball (MLB) right-handed pitcher who played for the Chicago White Sox in 1982 and 1984.

== Early life ==
Siwy was born in Pawtucket, Rhode Island, on September 20, 1958. He attended Central Falls High School in Central Falls, Rhode Island, graduating from the school in 1976. After graduating, and after a stint in American Legion Baseball, he entered Rhode Island College (RIC) and became a part of their baseball program. In 1979, Siwy was a member of the RIC team that reached the 1979 NCAA Division III baseball tournament finals, earning the victory in the last game of the regional tournament that clinched their appearance in the finals. That summer, he would pitch for the Harwich Mariners in the Cape Cod Baseball League.

In January 1980, Siwy was selected in the third round of the MLB draft by the Chicago White Sox. (Note: The January draft was typically used to select players who graduated from high school in winter, players from junior colleges, and players who had dropped out of four-year colleges. This draft was abolished after the 1986 season.) He turned down a contract from the team and instead elected to become a police officer in Central Falls. Siwy served in this role for a year, before deciding to give baseball a try in 1981.

== Early career in the White Sox organization ==
Siwy started his 1981 campaign with the Single-A Midwest League's Appleton Foxes. He was named to the league's All-Star roster that year with a 5–0 record and a 1.96 earned run average (ERA). This earned Siwy a call up to the Double-A Glens Falls White Sox of the Eastern League where he went 11–4 with a 3.85 ERA.

Invited to spring training in 1982, Siwy was assigned to the Triple-A Edmonton Trappers of the Pacific Coast League (PCL) for much of the season. Over the course of the season he would earn a 12–8 record with a 4.04 ERA. He earned his first call-up to the Major League roster in late August. Debuting in relief on August 20 against the Kansas City Royals, Siwy struck out the first batter he faced, John Wathan, but would later allow a three-run home run to Hal McRae and two other runs before being removed. All told, in two innings of work, Siwy allowed four hits, five earned runs, and walked three batters. Three days later, against the Cleveland Indians, Siwy was given a start by the White Sox. Over five innings, Siwy would allow six hits and three earned runs. He received a no-decision in the game. (Note: Siwy only gave up one of these runs while pitching; reliever Kevin Hickey allowed a two-run single that scored two runners that Siwy had initially allowed to reach base.)

Siwy spent 1983 with the Denver Bears of the American Association (AA), which replaced Edmonton as Chicago's Triple-A affiliate. Pitching mostly in relief, he recorded a 6.14 ERA and five saves. His season ended prematurely when he broke two knuckles attempting to punch a chair in anger following a bad appearance in a game.

Staying with Denver for the following year, which changed its nickname from the Bears to Zephyrs in the interim, Siwy returned to a starting role at the minor league level in 1984. His time in Denver was interrupted by a major league call-up in May. Siwy made one appearance with the White Sox during his call-up, pitching 4 1/3 innings in relief of LaMarr Hoyt on May 12. He allowed three hits in his outing and two walks, only allowing one run on a Billy Sample sacrifice fly. He was sent back to Denver shortly afterwards. Overall with the Zephyrs, he had a 4–5 record and a 5.25 ERA. On June 26, Siwy was traded to the Cleveland Indians to complete a trade for pitcher Dan Spillner. (Note: Spillner was originally traded for a player to be named later on June 21st. June 26th was when Siwy was announced as the player acquired by Cleveland.)

== Later professional career ==
Assigned to the Triple-A Maine Guides of the International League by the Indians, Siwy pitched in only seven games with the club in 1984 due to a shoulder injury; when healthy, he recorded a 2.04 ERA and a pair of saves in seven games pitched. He was added to their 40-man roster after the season ended. During the offseason, Siwy played in the Caribbean Series with the Venezuelan Tiburones de La Guaira as a means of working on his pitches.

Siwy started the 1985 season as a candidate to make the major league roster. Despite a good spring, he was sent back to Maine, where he would struggle during the first weeks of the season. Siwy was then released by the Indians on April 22. He was quickly re-signed by the White Sox and assigned to the Buffalo Bisons of the AA; the team had replaced Denver as the White Sox' Triple-A affiliate for the 1985 season. Siwy's time in Buffalo did not last the season, as he would be released after 16 games, 13 in relief, with the Bisons. He finished the year with the Double-A Birmingham Barons of the Southern League, an affiliate of the Detroit Tigers.

Siwy spent 1986 with the San Diego Padre-affiliated Las Vegas Stars of the PCL. He received his highest number of starts in four years, and ultimately went 6–4 with a 3.56 ERA during the season. Siwy remained with Las Vegas for the 1987 season and served predominantly a reliever that year. He finished the season with a 6–8 record with a 5.78 ERA in what would ultimately become his last year in professional baseball.

== Later life ==
Siwy returned to law enforcement in 1989 when he became part of the Las Vegas Metropolitan Police Department (LVMPD). He remained with the LVMPD until retiring at the end of 2012. At the time of his retirement, he was a sergeant for the LVMPD.
