= Hollywood Hills High School =

Magnet school in Florida, United States

Coordinates: 26.046202°N 80.197945°W

Location
- 5400 Stirling Road; Hollywood, Florida 33021; United States

Information
- Type: Public
- School district: Broward County Public Schools
- Superintendent: Dr. Peter B. Licata
- Principal: Daniel Most
- Staff: 75.53 (FTE)
- Grades: 9–12
- Enrollment: 1,799 (2023-2024)
- Average class size: 30
- Student to teacher ratio: 23.82
- Campus: Suburban
- Colors: Blue; Orange
- Team name: Spartans
- Website: hollywoodhillshigh.browardschools.com

Hollywood Hills High School is a public high school in Hollywood, Florida, United States. The school serves sections of Hollywood and Davie.

As of the 2024–25 school year, the total student enrollment was 1,711. The ethnic makeup of the school was 13% White, 23.3% Black, 56.3% Hispanic, 3.4% Asian, 0.2% Pacific Islander, 2.3% Multiracial, and 1.5% Native American or Native Alaskan.

== Small Learning Communities ==
Hollywood Hills High School contains "Small Learning Communities."

- The School of Business and Human Services welcomes students who are interested in the fields of marketing, fashion, business management, culinary arts, childcare and education. Core subjects will incorporate business applications of the subject knowledge. All students selecting this SLC must take business systems and technology.
- The School of Government and Communications welcomes students who would like to become translators, linguists, mediators, diplomats, lawyers, police or security officers, politicians, historians, government workers, journalists, T.V. producers or web designers.

It provides courses that are focused on cultural development and human interactions. All students in this SLC must take one of the following: geography, speech and debate, or journalism.

- The School of Liberal, Creative, and Performing Arts welcomes students interested in the creative production of ideas and the development of student talents. Core subjects encourage creative expression with an emphasis on matching a student's talents with possible career paths.
- The School of Health, Science, and Engineering welcomes students interested in a career that involves problem solving, investigation, technical design, and/or one of the many medical related fields. Hands-on activities and experiential learning are incorporated into the core subjects. All students in the SLC must enroll in either anatomy and physiology or physics before graduation.

== Athletics ==
- Marching band (boys' and girls')
- Basketball (boys' and girls')
- Baseball (boys')
- Cross country (boys' and girls')
- American football (boys')
- Flag football (girls')
- Soccer (boys' and girls')
- Swimming (boys' and girls')
- Track and field (boys' and girls')
- Softball (girls')
- Volleyball (boys' and girls')
- Water polo (boys' and girls')
- Wrestling (boys')
- Cheerleading (boys' and girls')

== Notable alumni ==
- Thurston Armbrister – professional football linebacker
- Robert Becker – Entertainment Producer
- Bob Fallon – professional baseball pitcher
- Adam Gaynor – former member of Matchbox Twenty
- Alan Gelfand – inventor of the ollie skateboarding trick
- Bill Lindsey – professional baseball catcher
- Fred Melamed – actor
- Dexter Nottage – professional football defensive end
- Josh Samuda – professional football offensive guard
- Jabaal Sheard – professional football defensive end and Super Bowl LI champion
- Keith Uecker – professional football offensive lineman
- Robert Wexler – former U.S. Congressman from Florida
- Christian Aguiar – sports graphics designer at Bowling Green Hot Rods, Philadelphia Union, now Carolina Hurricanes
