= Jesse Barfield =

American baseball player (born 1959)

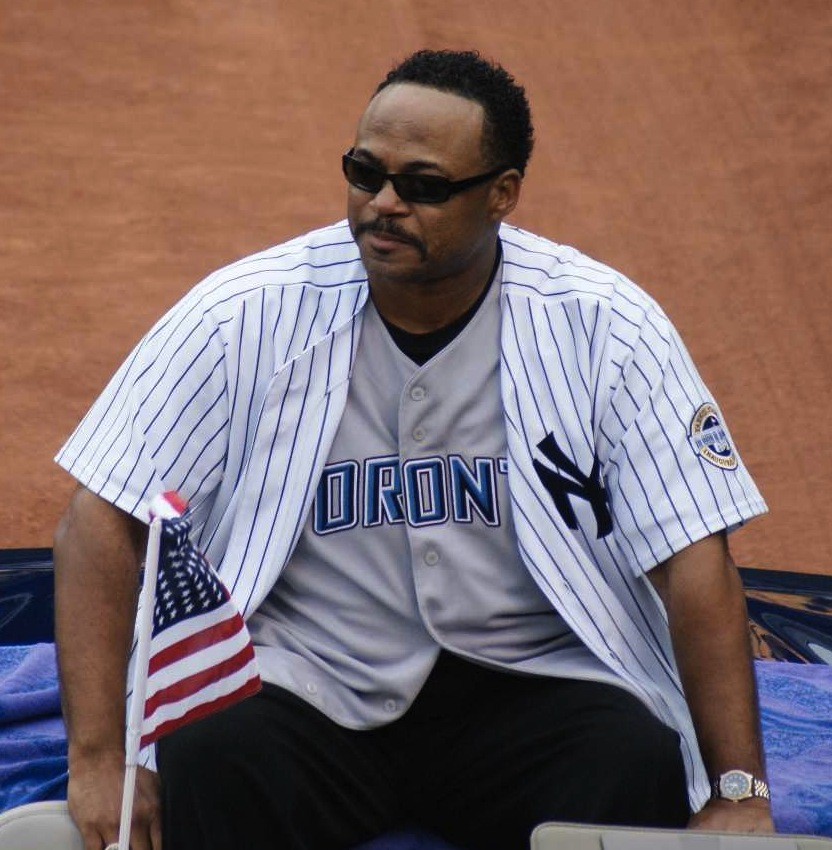
- Barfield in 2009
- Right fielder
- Born: October 29, 1959 (age 66); Joliet, Illinois, U.S.
- Batted: Right Threw: Right

Professional debut
- MLB: September 3, 1981, for the Toronto Blue Jays
- NPB: April 10, 1993, for the Yomiuri Giants

Last appearance
- MLB: June 17, 1992, for the New York Yankees
- NPB: October 21, 1993, for the Yomiuri Giants

MLB statistics
- Batting average: .256
- Home runs: 241
- Runs batted in: 716

NPB statistics
- Batting average: .215
- Home runs: 26
- Runs batted in: 53
- Stats at Baseball Reference

Teams
- As player: Toronto Blue Jays (1981–1989); New York Yankees (1989–1992); Yomiuri Giants (1993); As coach: Houston Astros (1995); Seattle Mariners (1998–1999)

Career highlights and awards
- All-Star (1986); 2× Gold Glove Award (1986, 1987); Silver Slugger Award (1986); AL home run leader (1986)

Member of the Canadian

Baseball Hall of Fame
- Induction: 2023

Jesse Lee Barfield (born October 29, 1959) is an American former professional baseball player and coach. He played in Major League Baseball as a right fielder from 1981 to 1992 for the Toronto Blue Jays and the New York Yankees.

A two-time Gold Glove Award winner, Barfield was a strong defensive player with a powerful throwing arm that allowed him to lead American League (AL) outfielders five times in assists. He ended his playing career ranked second only to Baseball Hall of Famer Chuck Klein in outfield assists per 1,000 innings. He was also provided strong offense, winning a Silver Slugger Award and leading the American League in home runs in 1986, the same year he was named to the American League All-Star team.

Injuries prematurely ended Barfield's major league career after 11 seasons. He played his final season of professional baseball in 1993 with the Yomiuri Giants of the Nippon Professional Baseball league. After his playing career, Barfield worked as a major league coach for the Houston Astros, Texas Rangers and the Seattle Mariners.

== Career ==
=== Toronto Blue Jays (1981–1989) ===
Barfield was selected by the Toronto Blue Jays in the ninth round (233rd overall) of the 1977 Major League Baseball draft. He made his major league debut on September 3, 1981, going 1-for-4 with one RBI and a stolen base in a 4–3 win against the Chicago White Sox. In the fifth Inning, Barfield recorded an RBI single in off White Sox pitcher Steve Trout for his first career hit and RBI. He appeared in 25 games to close out the season, batting .232 with two home runs and 9 RBI. Barfield became the Blue Jays' starting right fielder the following season, and hit .246 with 18 home runs and 58 RBI in 139 games. On April 25, he hit the first grand slam in Blue Jays franchise history against the Boston Red Sox. After the season, Barfield finished eighth in American League Rookie of the Year voting.

In 1983, Barfield hit .253 with 27 home runs and 68 RBI in 128 games. The following year, he increased his average to .284 with 14 home runs and 49 RBI in 110 games. Barfield combined with George Bell and Lloyd Moseby to form what many analysts considered the best all-around outfields of the 1980s for the Blue Jays.

In 1985, Barfield batted .289 with an on-base percentage of .369 and a slugging percentage of .536, which was 42 percent higher than the league average or adjusted OPS+. He hit for both power and speed, with 27 home runs, 84 RBI, 22 stolen bases, 22 assists and achieved 6.8 Wins Above Replacement. His batting average was a career-high, and he became the first Blue Jays player to hit 20 homers and steal 20 bases in the same season. That season Toronto reached the playoffs for the first time in franchise history. In his only playoff competition—the American League Championship Series (ALCS)—Barfield batted .280 with one home run, 4 RBI, and one stolen base in the Blue Jays' seven-game loss to the Kansas City Royals.

Despite the Blue Jays' failure to defend their 1985 division title, Barfield enjoyed his best personal season in 1986. He collected career-highs in batting average (.289, tying the previous season), 40 home runs, 108 RBI, 107 runs, 170 hits, 35 doubles, and wRC+ (147). His 40 homers led the major leagues and set a team record that lasted one year. Also, Barfield won both a Gold Glove Award and a Silver Slugger Award, and he was selected to the American League All-Star team.

The 1987 season saw Barfield play in a career-high 159 games, hitting .263 with 28 home runs and 84 RBI. He also won his second Gold Glove that year. The following year, his average dipped to .244 with 18 home runs and 56 RBI in 137 games. In 1989, he began the season batting just .200 with five home runs (out of 16 total hits) and 11 RBI in 28 games.

=== New York Yankees (1989–1992) ===
On April 30, 1989, Barfield was traded to the New York Yankees for pitcher Al Leiter. Barfield finished the 1989 season with the Yankees, and his average increased slightly to .240, with 18 home runs and 56 RBI in 129 games. In 1990, he hit .246 with 25 home runs and 78 RBI in 153 games, but he never produced quite like the club had hoped. In 1991, Barfield hit just .225, although he produced 17 home runs and 48 RBI in 84 games for a Yankees team that was one of the worst in recent history.

By 1992, injuries and general ineffectiveness forced his retirement at the age of 32, after he hit just .137 (13-for-95) with two home runs and 7 RBI in 30 games. He was granted free agency on November 4.

While with the Yankees, Barfield was a resident of Tenafly, New Jersey.

=== Final years ===
In 1993, Barfield played in Japan with the Yomiuri Giants, reuniting with Lloyd Moseby, but he batted just .215 with 26 home runs and 53 RBI in 104 games.

Barfield joined the Houston Astros for spring training in 1994 and was projected to be the opening-day right-fielder, but injuries prevented him from making the team. He then joined the Astros as a coach in 1995.

== Career overview ==
Throughout his career, Barfield was a free swinger and racked up more than 140 strikeouts in each of five seasons (1985–1987, 1989, and 1990). For most of his time in the Major Leagues, his productivity overshadowed his strikeouts; however, by 1990, one in three of Barfield's at bats resulted in a strikeout.

Barfield was a career .256 hitter with 241 home runs, 716 RBI, and a 39.4 WAR in 1,428 games. He was inducted in the Kinston Professional Baseball Hall of Fame in 1990. In 2023, Barfield was elected into the Canadian Baseball Hall of Fame.

== Later life ==
Barfield's elder son, Josh, is a former infielder with the San Diego Padres and Cleveland Indians. Another son, Jeremy, was selected by the New York Mets during the 2006 draft. Jeremy opted to attend San Jacinto Community College instead and was drafted again in 2008 by the Oakland Athletics. He spent eight seasons in the Athletics' and Colorado Rockies' minor league systems and two independent leagues before joining the Boston Red Sox organization in 2017.

On August 22, 2006, the Associated Press reported that Barfield was taken to a hospital after he suffered a head injury when he was allegedly shoved down a flight of lower stairs by his son, Jeremy, during a family argument. The incident also resulted in Jeremy's arrest on a Class A misdemeanor charge of family assault.

In 2007 and 2008, Barfield served as a color commentator for Blue Jays games on CBC. Currently, he works at Competitive Edge Sports in The Woodlands, Texas.

== See also ==
- List of Major League Baseball career home run leaders
- List of Major League Baseball annual home run leaders
