= Keith Uecker =

American football player and coach (born 1960)

No. 67, 70
- Position: Guard

Personal information
- Born: June 29, 1960 (age 66); Hollywood, Florida, U.S.
- Listed height: 6 ft 5 in (1.96 m)
- Listed weight: 278 lb (126 kg)

Career information
- High school: Hollywood Hills
- College: Auburn
- NFL draft: 1982: 9th round, 243rd overall pick

Career history

Playing
- Denver Broncos (1982–1984); Green Bay Packers (1984–1991)

Coaching
- University of Akron (1999–2003) (offensive line); Wayne State University (2004–2005) (offensive line); Ohio State University (2009–2010) (offensive quality control); Omaha Nighthawks (2010) (offensive line); Adrian College (2011–present) (offensive line, assistant head coach)

Awards and highlights
- Ed Block Courage Award; 2× Ken Rice Award; Third-team All-American (1981); First-team All-SEC (1981)

Career NFL statistics
- Games played: 85
- Games started: 49
- Fumble recoveries: 3
- Stats at Pro Football Reference

Richard Keith Uecker (born June 29, 1960) is an American former professional football player who was a guard in the National Football League (NFL) who played eight seasons for the Green Bay Packers and two for the Denver Broncos. Uecker is currently the offensive line coach and assistant head coach at Adrian College (Michigan), an NCAA Division III school.

== College career ==
Uecker was an All-American for the Auburn Tigers in 1981 and was a four-year starter for the Tigers, earning All-SEC honors. Serving as 1981 team captain, he was twice the winner of the Ken Rice Award as the team's outstanding offensive lineman.

== Professional career ==
Uecker was selected in the ninth round of the 1982 NFL draft by the Denver Broncos. He spent two seasons with the team, playing 21 games and starting two. He joined the Green Bay Packers in the 1984 season. With the Packers, he was a four-year starter and played all five line positions. He was the 1987 recipient of the prestigious Ed Block Courage Award.

In 1987, Uecker was the only Packers player to cross the NFL player strike picket lines and played along with replacement players that season.

1n 1989, Uecker was among the first class of NFL players suspended for steroid use.

== Post-playing career ==
Uecker has worked with the Ohio State University as offensive quality control coach (2009–2010) and most recently as offensive line coach with the UFL's Omaha Nighthawks (2010). He served as the offensive line coach at Wayne State University (2004–2005) and the University of Akron (1999–2003) before spending several years in the automotive industry. He also did an internship with the Denver Broncos during their 2008 training camp.

== Personal life ==
In 1988, Uecker earned his accounting degree from Auburn. A native of Hollywood, Florida, Uecker has four children: Victoria, Jack, Clayton and Jane.
