= Kevin Hagen (baseball) =

American baseball player (born 1960)

- Pitcher
- Born: March 8, 1960 (age 66); Renton, Washington, U.S.
- Batted: Right Threw: Right

MLB debut
- June 4, 1983, for the St. Louis Cardinals

Last MLB appearance
- September 29, 1984, for the St. Louis Cardinals

MLB statistics
- Win–loss record: 3–2
- Earned run average: 4.25
- Strikeouts: 9
- Stats at Baseball Reference

Teams
- St. Louis Cardinals (1983–1984)

Kevin Eugene Hagen (born March 8, 1960) is an American former pitcher in Major League Baseball who played from 1983 through 1984 for the St. Louis Cardinals. Listed at 6' 2", 185 lb., Hagen batted and threw right-handed. He attended Bellevue Community College.

In a two-season career, Hagen posted a 3–2 record with a 4.25 ERA in 13 appearances, including four starts, giving up 17 runs (three unearned) on 43 hits and eight walks while striking out nine in 29 2/3 innings of work.
