= Steve Christmas =

American baseball player (born 1957)

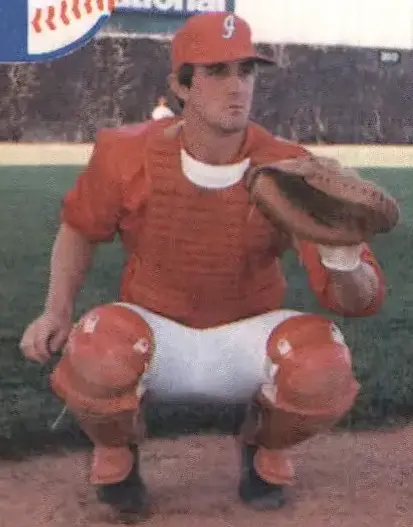
- Christmas with the Indianapolis Indians c. 1982
- Catcher
- Born: December 9, 1957 (age 68); Orlando, Florida, U.S.
- Batted: Left Threw: Right

MLB debut
- September 1, 1983, for the Cincinnati Reds

Last MLB appearance
- April 28, 1986, for the Chicago Cubs

MLB statistics
- Batting average: .162
- Home runs: 1
- Runs batted in: 7
- Stats at Baseball Reference

Teams
- Cincinnati Reds (1983); Chicago White Sox (1984); Chicago Cubs (1986)

Stephen Randal Christmas (born December 9, 1957) is an American former professional baseball player. He played in 24 games over three seasons in Major League Baseball (MLB) primarily as a catcher. He went 4-for-11 in 1984 for the Chicago White Sox with one home run, while getting a combined 2 hits in 26 at bats in his other two seasons.
