= Randy Moffitt =

American baseball player (1948–2025)

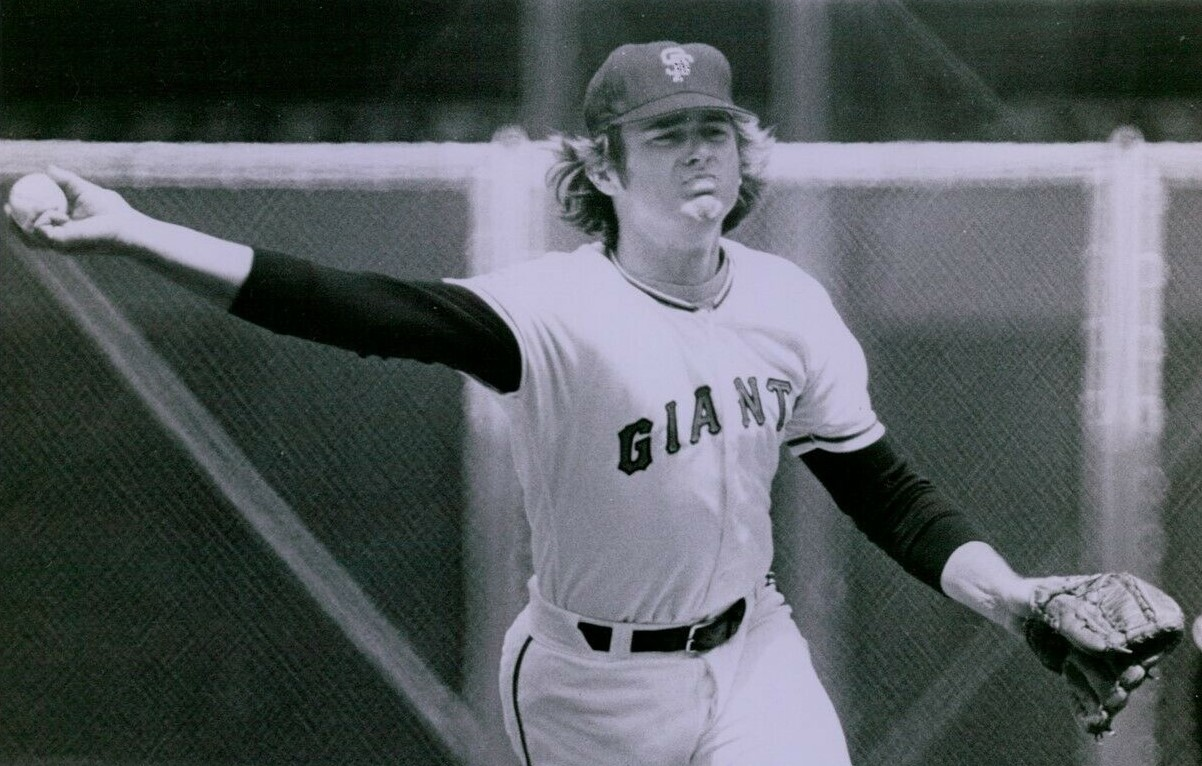
- Pitcher
- Born: October 13, 1948; Long Beach, California, U.S.
- Died: August 28, 2025 (aged 76); Long Beach, California, U.S.
- Batted: Right Threw: Right

MLB debut
- June 11, 1972, for the San Francisco Giants

Last MLB appearance
- September 19, 1983, for the Toronto Blue Jays

MLB statistics
- Win–loss record: 43–52
- Earned run average: 3.65
- Strikeouts: 455
- Saves: 96
- Stats at Baseball Reference

Teams
- San Francisco Giants (1972–1981); Houston Astros (1982); Toronto Blue Jays (1983)

Career highlights and awards
- San Francisco Giants Wall of Fame

Randall James Moffitt (October 13, 1948 – August 28, 2025) was an American professional baseball pitcher. He played in Major League Baseball (MLB) for the San Francisco Giants, Houston Astros, and Toronto Blue Jays. Born in Long Beach, California, he was the younger brother of tennis star Billie Jean Moffitt King, and alumnus of Long Beach Polytechnic High School and California State University, Long Beach.

== Career ==
Moffitt was drafted by the Giants in the 1st round (18th pick) of the 1970 amateur draft. After a successful year as a starting pitcher for the Class-A Fresno Giants (9–6, 1.60) he was converted to relief with the Triple-A Phoenix Giants in 1971. He was called up to the big club in 1972, making his Major League Baseball debut on June 11.

In 1979, during his eighth year with the Giants, Moffitt contracted Cryptosporidia enteritis. By the end of the season, he was easily exhausted, vomiting frequently and lost around 25 pounds. His physicians were unable to determine what was causing his illness, with one suggesting that his problem was mental. Following a bloody stool incident during a plane trip in 1980, Moffitt had a colonoscopy done and a biopsy of a bleeding ulcer revealed the presence of Cryptosporidium parasites. According to a Sports Illustrated article, "it's reasonable to assume he caught it from a horse—although nobody knows how." Moffitt's recovery was slow and he was released from the Giants on August 4, 1981.

He was a dependable relief pitcher for many years, and finished in the National League Top Ten four times for saves and three times for games pitched. During the 1970s he partnered first with Elías Sosa and later with Gary Lavelle to give the Giants one of the league's better bullpens. In 534 career pitching appearances (all but one in relief) he finished 306 games including 96 saves.

== Death ==
Moffitt died following a long illness in Long Beach, California, on August 28, 2025, at the age of 76.
