= Stan Clarke =

American baseball player (born 1960)

- Pitcher
- Born: August 9, 1960 (age 65); Toledo, Ohio, U.S.
- Batted: Left Threw: Left

MLB debut
- June 7, 1983, for the Toronto Blue Jays

Last MLB appearance
- September 29, 1990, for the St. Louis Cardinals

MLB statistics
- Win–loss record: 3–6
- Earned run average: 6.79
- Strikeouts: 36
- Stats at Baseball Reference

Teams
- Toronto Blue Jays (1983, 1985–1986); Seattle Mariners (1987); Kansas City Royals (1989); St. Louis Cardinals (1990)

Stanley Martin Clarke (born August 9, 1960) is an American former professional baseball pitcher. He played in Major League Baseball (MLB) for parts of six seasons with the Toronto Blue Jays, Seattle Mariners, Kansas City Royals, and St. Louis Cardinals.

A native of Toledo, Ohio, Clarke attended Woodward High School and the University of Toledo. In 1980, he played collegiate summer baseball with the Wareham Gatemen of the Cape Cod Baseball League. He also played for the United States national team in an amateur tournament in Colorado and was named to the All-World tournament team.

The Blue Jays selected Clarke in the sixth round of the 1981 MLB draft. He signed for a $20,000 bonus. He made his MLB debut on June 7, 1983. He suffered a serious shoulder injury in 1984. The Mariners selected Clarke in the 1986 Rule 5 draft. In his rookie season with Seattle in 1987, he went 2–2 with a 5.48 earned run average in a career-high 22 MLB games. After the season, Seattle traded him to the Detroit Tigers for Bruce Fields. He pitched in Triple-A for his hometown Toledo Mud Hens in 1988, then signed with Kansas City. In the first of two starts with the Royals, he allowed seven runs in one inning. After one season with the Royals, he signed a free agent contract with the Cardinals. He played for the Triple-A Louisville Redbirds before retiring due to his daughter's illness.

== Personal life ==
Clarke and his wife have four children. Their oldest daughter, Sara, died of leukemia at age 7.

Clarke fractured a leg after being hit by a line drive while pitching in an amateur game in Toledo following his professional career.

Clarke was inducted into the Toledo Rockets hall of fame in 1997.
