= Dave Geisel =

American baseball player (born 1955)

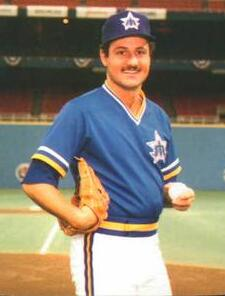
- Geisel with the Seattle Mariners c. 1985
- Pitcher
- Born: January 18, 1955 (age 71); Windber, Pennsylvania, U.S.
- Batted: Left Threw: Left

MLB debut
- June 13, 1978, for the Chicago Cubs

Last MLB appearance
- May 18, 1985, for the Seattle Mariners

MLB statistics
- Win–loss record: 5–5
- Earned run average: 4.01
- Strikeouts: 144
- Stats at Baseball Reference

Teams
- Chicago Cubs (1978–1979, 1981); Toronto Blue Jays (1982–1983); Seattle Mariners (1984–1985)

John David Geisel (born January 18, 1955) is an American former professional baseball pitcher. He played in Major League Baseball (MLB) for the Chicago Cubs, Toronto Blue Jays, and Seattle Mariners.

== Overview ==
Dave Geisel graduated from Tonawanda High School in Tonawanda, New York in 1973, and was originally drafted by the Chicago Cubs in the 5th round of the 1973 Major League Baseball draft.

Geisel made his major league debut with the Cubs on June 13, 1978, at Riverfront Stadium, pitching one relief inning against the Reds without allowing a baserunner. In March 1982, the Cubs traded Geisel to the Toronto Blue Jays to complete an earlier deal in which the Cubs sent a player to be named later to the Blue Jays for pitcher Paul Mirabella.

In the 1983 offseason, Geisel was selected by the Seattle Mariners from Toronto in the 1983 rule 5 draft. He pitched his final major league game on May 18, 1985, at Seattle's Kingdome in a victory over the visiting Baltimore Orioles.

Geisel pitched in all or part of seven seasons between 1978 and 1985 making 131 game appearances, all but 8 in relief.
