= Matt Williams (right-handed pitcher) =

American baseball player (born 1959)

- Pitcher
- Born: July 25, 1959 (age 66); Houston, Texas, U.S.
- Batted: Right Threw: Right

MLB debut
- August 2, 1983, for the Toronto Blue Jays

Last MLB appearance
- October 5, 1985, for the Texas Rangers

MLB statistics
- Win–loss record: 3-2
- Earned run average: 5.29
- Strikeouts: 27
- Stats at Baseball Reference

Teams
- Toronto Blue Jays (1983); Texas Rangers (1985)

Matthew Evan Williams (born July 25, 1959) is an American former professional baseball pitcher. He pitched parts of two seasons in Major League Baseball: 1983 for the Toronto Blue Jays and 1985 for the Texas Rangers.

Williams was the Blue Jays' first-round pick in the 1981 Major League Baseball draft and the fifth pick overall out of Rice University. He debuted for the Blue Jays in 1983, but pitched just 8 innings in 4 games before returning to the minor leagues. After another two years in the minors, Williams was traded to the Rangers as part of a deal to acquire Cliff Johnson. Williams pitched six games down the stretch for Texas, including three starts, with an ERA of 2.42. Despite this impressive showing, he never again played in the major leagues.
