= Chris Jones (1980s outfielder) =

American baseball player (born 1957)

- Outfielder
- Born: July 13, 1957 (age 69); Los Angeles, California, U.S.
- Batted: Left Threw: Left

MLB debut
- June 8, 1985, for the Houston Astros

Last MLB appearance
- June 13, 1986, for the San Francisco Giants

MLB statistics
- Batting average: .192
- Home runs: 0
- Runs batted in: 1
- Stats at Baseball Reference

Teams
- Houston Astros (1985); San Francisco Giants (1986)

Christopher Dale Jones (born July 13, 1957) is an American former backup outfielder in Major League Baseball who played for the Houston Astros (1985) and San Francisco Giants (1986). He batted and threw left-handed. He was signed out of San Diego State by Scout Bob Cluck.

In a two-season career, Jones was a .192 hitter (5-for-26) with one RBI and no home runs in 34 games played.
