= Thurston Armbrister =

American football player (born 1992)

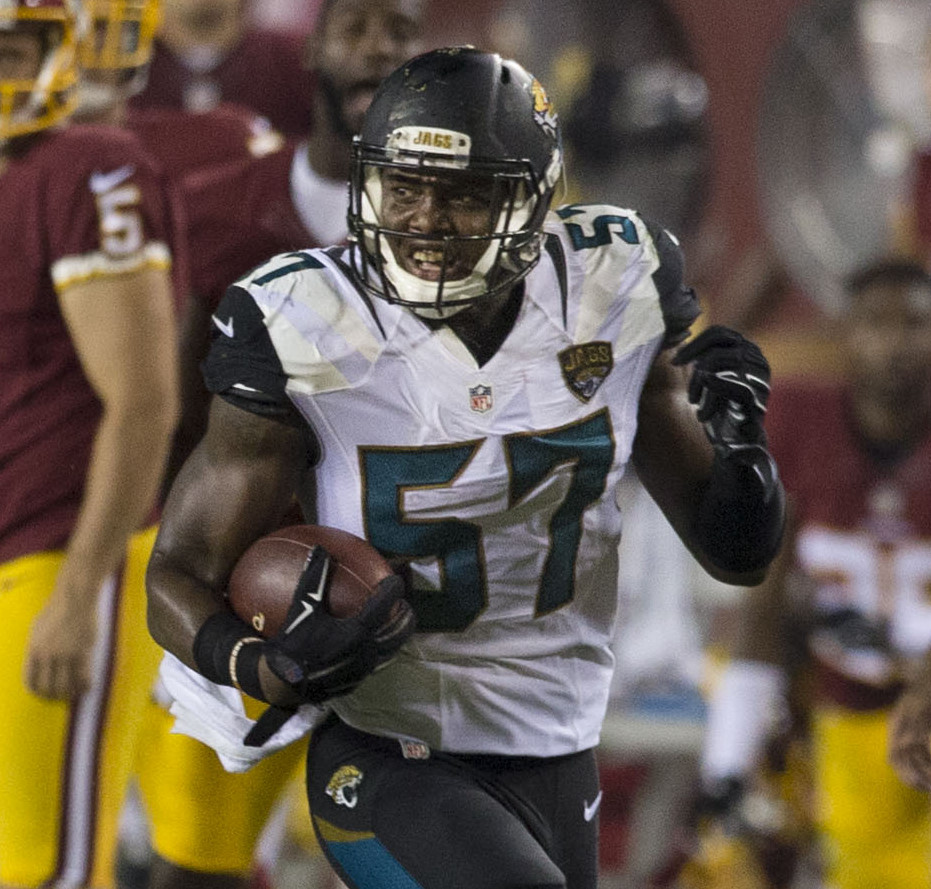
- Armbrister with the Jacksonville Jaguars in 2015

No. 50, 57, 58
- Position: Linebacker

Personal information
- Born: December 25, 1992 (age 33); Hollywood, Florida, U.S.
- Listed height: 6 ft 2 in (1.88 m)
- Listed weight: 239 lb (108 kg)

Career information
- High school: Hollywood Hills
- College: Miami (FL)
- NFL draft: 2015: undrafted

Career history
- Jacksonville Jaguars (2015); Detroit Lions (2016–2017); New York Giants (2018); Arizona Cardinals (2018); Team 9 (2020)*; Tampa Bay Vipers (2020)
- * Offseason or practice squad member only

Career NFL statistics
- Total tackles: 39
- Sacks: 0
- Forced fumbles: 0
- Fumble recoveries: 0
- Interceptions: 0
- Stats at Pro Football Reference

Thurston Armbrister (born December 25, 1992) is an American former professional football player who was a linebacker in the National Football League (NFL). He played college football for the Miami Hurricanes. He signed with the Jacksonville Jaguars as an undrafted free agent in 2015.

== Early life ==
Armbrister was born in 1992 on Christmas morning in Hollywood, Florida as the third of five children. His family affectionately nicknamed him "Head" during his childhood due to his head being big in proportion to his body. Armbrister attended Hollywood Hills High School where he played safety. Armbrister also played basketball and ran track and field in high school.

== College career ==
Armbrister signed with the University of Miami as late as June 2011 and joined its practice squad as a true freshman. He began his college career in his sophomore year during the 2012 season and went on to play in all the games until his senior year during the 2014 season. While at the University of Miami, Armbrister majored in exercise physiology with a back-up plan to start a career as a physical therapist.

== Professional career ==
=== Jacksonville Jaguars ===
On May 2, 2015, Armbrister signed with the Jacksonville Jaguars as an undrafted free agent following the conclusion of the 2015 NFL draft. On September 3, 2016, he was released by the Jaguars.

=== Detroit Lions ===
On September 4, 2016, Armbrister was claimed off waivers by the Lions.

On September 2, 2017, Armbrister was waived by the Lions and was signed to the practice squad the next day. He was promoted to the active roster on September 30, 2017. He was waived on October 11, 2017 and was re-signed to the practice squad. He was released on November 29, 2017, but re-signed two days later.

=== New York Giants ===
On January 9, 2018, Armbrister signed a futures contract with the New York Giants. He was waived/injured on August 20, 2018 due to a hamstring injury and was placed on injured reserve. He was released on October 2, 2018.

=== Arizona Cardinals ===
On November 28, 2018, Armbrister was signed to the Arizona Cardinals practice squad, and promoted to the active roster two days later. He was placed on injured reserve on December 11, 2018.

On February 20, 2019, Armbrister was waived by the Cardinals.

=== Tampa Bay Vipers ===
Armbrister signed with the XFL's Team 9 practice squad during the regular season. He was signed off of Team 9 by the Tampa Bay Vipers on March 9, 2020. He had his contract terminated when the league suspended operations on April 10, 2020.

== Personal life ==
Armbrister has an older brother Terrence Ebagua who was a walk-on tight end at Florida State and went on to play in the Professional Indoor Football League. Armbrister had a younger sister born a year after him, who died at age 3.
