= Bryan Clark (baseball) =

American baseball player (born 1956)

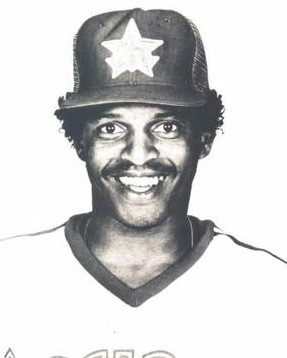
- Pitcher
- Born: July 12, 1956 (age 70); Madera, California, U.S.
- Batted: Left Threw: Left

MLB debut
- April 11, 1981, for the Seattle Mariners

Last MLB appearance
- May 30, 1990, for the Seattle Mariners

MLB statistics
- Win–loss record: 20–23
- Earned run average: 4.15
- Strikeouts: 259
- Stats at Baseball Reference

Teams
- Seattle Mariners (1981–1983); Toronto Blue Jays (1984); Cleveland Indians (1985); Chicago White Sox (1986–1987); Seattle Mariners (1990)

Bryan Donald Clark (born July 12, 1956) is an American former pitcher in Major League Baseball who played for the Seattle Mariners, Toronto Blue Jays, Cleveland Indians and Chicago White Sox in a span of eight seasons from 1981 to 1990. A native of Madera, California, Clark was listed at 6'2", 185 lb., and batted and threw left-handed. He attended Fresno Community College.

== Career ==
Clark was selected in the 10th round (227th overall) by the Pittsburgh Pirates in the 1974 MLB draft. As he began his professional career, Clark proved pretty quickly in the minor leagues that his control was very suspect. For example, in just his second year in the minors, he walked 138 batters in only 131 innings of work. Used mostly as a starter in the minors, he posted ERAs over 6 in two seasons, and he walked over 100 batters four times. Clark's best season in the minors came in 1979, in which he went 14–5 with a 2.64 ERA in 23 starts. However, he still walked 112 batters in 167 innings of work.

Although his minor league statistics were not too impressive, Clark still managed to make his major league debut on April 11, 1981, at the age of 24 against the California Angels. Although he was technically a pitcher, he was used in a rather unorthodox way in his debut - the Mariners (who purchased him from the Pirates in 1978) used him as a pinch runner.

Clark spent the rest of his career trying to find his niche. He was used both as a starter and reliever throughout his career, with his best season being 1982, when he went 5–2 with a 2.75 ERA in 37 games (five starts). This season included his only complete game shutout, on September 25, 1982, against the Blue Jays. In the game, Clark gave up six hits, walked one, and struck out two.

On December 8, 1983, Clark was traded from the Mariners to the Blue Jays for Barry Bonnell. His control issues were demonstrated on August 19, 1983, against the Cleveland Indians. In just 2 2/3 innings of work, Clark managed to walk seven batters while allowing three earned runs. He earned a no-decision in Toronto's 6–5 loss. Clark finished his only season as a Blue Jay with a 1–2 record and a 5.91 ERA in 20 games (three starts).

Clark played his final game on May 30, 1990, with the Mariners, who had reacquired him in December 1989.

For his career, Clark posted a 20–23 record with a 4.15 ERA in 516.1 innings of work, walking 261 and striking out 259. He was sixth in the American League in wild pitches in 1981 with seven, and fourth in the league in wild pitches in 1983 with 10.

Clark played winter ball with the Tiburones de La Guaira and Navegantes del Magallanes clubs of the Venezuelan Professional Baseball League during seven seasons spanning 1980–1989, pitching also for La Guaira in the Caribbean Series in the 1983 and 1985 tournaments.

== Fact ==
- George Brett collected his 2,000th career hit off Clark.
