= Albert Williams (baseball) =

Nicaraguan baseball player (born 1954)

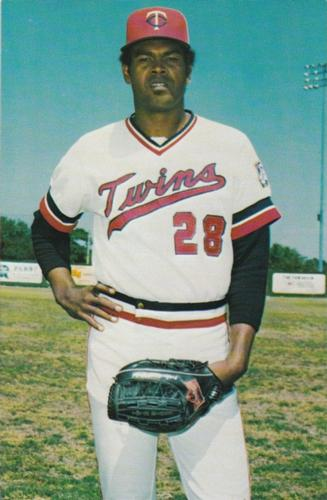
- Pitcher
- Born: May 6, 1954 (age 70); Pearl Lagoon, Nicaragua
- Batted: Right Threw: Right

MLB debut
- May 7, 1980, for the Minnesota Twins

Last MLB appearance
- September 26, 1984, for the Minnesota Twins

MLB statistics
- Win–loss record: 35–38
- Earned run average: 4.24
- Strikeouts: 262
- Stats at Baseball Reference

Teams
- Minnesota Twins (1980–1984)

Albert Hamilton Williams DeSouza (born May 6, 1954) is a Nicaraguan former professional baseball pitcher. He played all or part of five seasons in Major League Baseball, from 1980 until 1984, all for the Minnesota Twins.

Williams was originally signed by the Pittsburgh Pirates as an amateur free agent in 1975. He pitched two seasons in the Pirates minor league system, but was released by Pittsburgh because the Nicaraguan Government would not grant him a visa to leave the country to play baseball in the United States. This prompted Williams to sign up with the Sandinista rebels and he was engaged in jungle fighting against the forces of Anastasio Somoza from 1977 through 1978 during the Nicaraguan Revolution.

In 1979, Williams had to be smuggled out of Nicaragua and was signed a contract to play in the Inter-American League, where he pitched for the Caracas Metropolitanos and Panama Banqueros clubs. He then joined the Minnesota organization in 1980, where he spent five years. In 1984, he was the starting pitcher in the Twins season opener against the Detroit Tigers at the Metrodome.

In between, Williams played six seasons in the Venezuelan Winter League, making an appearance with the Tiburones de La Guaira in the 1983 Caribbean Series.

== Baseball career ==
=== Minnesota Twins ===
==== 1980 ====
On May 7, 1980, Albert Williams was called up to the Majors to make his debut against the Baltimore Orioles as a starter for 3 innings. In this game, he allowed 7 hits (making one of them a home run and having all four runs as earned) no walks, and struck out 2 batters.

On September 9, Williams started the game against the Milwaukee Brewers and finished it with having 6 hits off him: both runs as earned, 1 one strikeout, no homers allowed and allowing only 2 walks. Williams earned himself an ERA of 3.81 this game and won with the score of 15-2.

As a rookie in the Majors with the Twins, Williams pitched 18 games with a record of 6 wins and 2 lost and an ERA of 3.51. Out of the 18 games, 9 of them were as a starter and 3 of them were complete games. He pitched 77 innings, allowing 73 hits (9 of them being home runs). Williams struck out 35 batters and walked 30, having 33 runs scored on him.

== Sources ==
- Career statistics from Baseball Reference, or Baseball Reference (Minors), or Retrosheet
