= Nelson Barrera =

Mexican baseball player

- Third baseman
- Born: 17 October 1957; Ciudad del Carmen, Campeche, Mexico
- Died: 14 July 2002 (aged 44); Campeche City, Campeche, Mexico

Teams
- Diablos Rojos del México (1977–1991, 1995, 2002); Piratas de Campeche (1992–1994, 2002); Guerreros de Oaxaca (1996–2001)

Member of the Mexican Professional

Baseball Hall of Fame
- Induction: 2003

Nelson Barrera Romellón (17 October 1957 – 14 July 2002) was a Mexican professional baseball player, who at the time of his death led the Mexican League in career home runs (455) and RBIs (1,927). He was nicknamed El Almirante (The Admiral).

== Early life ==
Barrera was born in Ciudad del Carmen, Campeche on 17 October 1957.

== Career ==
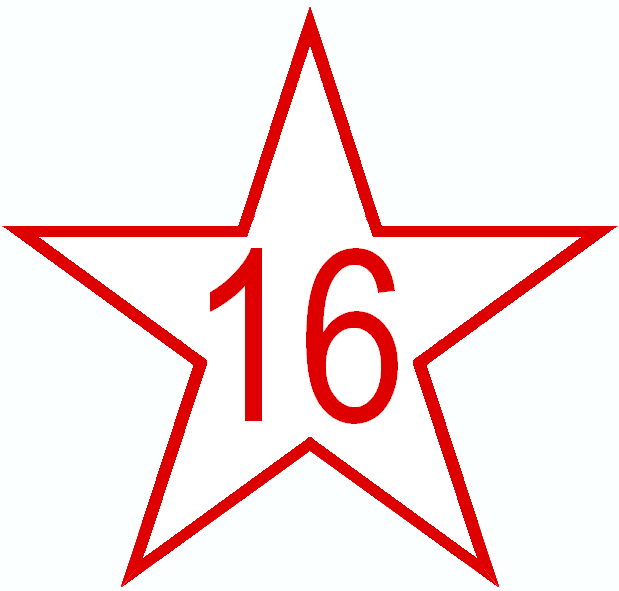
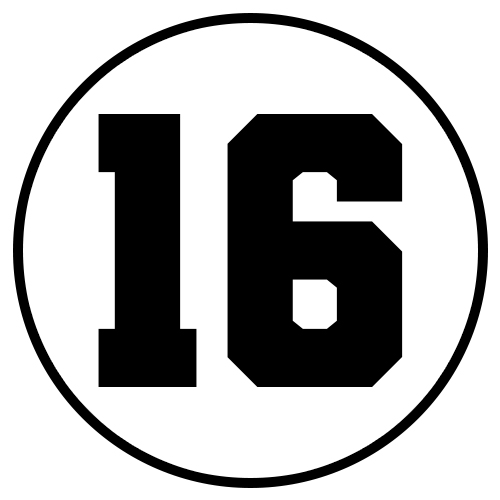
Barrera's number was retired by the Diablos Rojos del México (left), the Piratas de Campeche (center) and the Guerreros de Oaxaca in 2002.

A right-hander hitter and a native of the Mexican state of Campeche, Barrera entered the Mexican League in 1977 with the Diablos Rojos del México after playing three years in the Mexican Central League. He hit only .235 as a rookie, with two home runs, but he continued to improve. He broke 20 home runs, hitting .354 with 101 RBI in 1984. This earned him a look by the Chicago White Sox, who placed him on their AAA Buffalo Bisons American Association team. He hit just .176 with two homers in 74 at bats, and was cut by the Bisons. He then returned to Mexico with the Diablos Rojos, where he helped them win the pennant. He played for the Diablos Rojos for most of his career (1977–79, 1983–91, 1995).

Barrera won his only league home run title with 42 in 1987. He also led the circuit in RBIs with 134 in 1987 and 124 in 1988. On 22 April 1997, he drove in his 1,574th run, breaking the Mexican League record set by Héctor Espino.

In 1998 Barrera played and managed the Guerreros de Oaxaca when they won their only pennant. He contributed with a .321 average and 110 RBIs. This was his sixth season with more than 100 RBIs, something no one had accomplished before in the Mexican League. After he broke the all-time career RBI record, his old team Diablos Rojos organized an appreciation for him in the capital, at their old stadium, Parque del Seguro Social.

Then, in 2001 Barrera surpassed Espino's record for home runs, finishing the season with 455 to Espino's 453. Nevertheless, he was fired as the Guerreros' manager that year. He went on the disabled list as a player toward the end of the season.

Barrera was accused in 1988 of using a corked bat by the Tigres del México club. The umpires disagreed and the Mexican League fined the Tigres MX$1 million for defaming Barrera.

In 2002, Barrera returned to his hometown of Campeche, where he was player-manager for the Piratas de Campeche, still in the Mexican League. Previously, he had played with the Piratas from 1992 to 1994.

For the first time in his career, Barrera failed to hit a home run in the 2002 season. On April 13, he got his last hit, in Oaxaca against his old team.

== Death ==
On 14 July 2002, Barrera died instantly while trying to repair his roof. He was electrocuted when he accidentally touched a metal sheet that was in contact with some high voltage wires. He was 44 years old.

== Highlights ==
- Besides setting career records for home runs and RBIs in the Mexican League, Barrera also ranked:
  - First or second on the list of most games played in the league (2,733)
  - Third in runs scored
  - Second for the most hits (2,938)
  - Second in doubles
  - First in total bases
- His 455 career home runs are second in all of minor league baseball, to Hector Espino's 484, while his 2,045 RBI in the minors is 10% more than second-place Nick Cullop's 1,857.
- Set an all-time record with eight grand slams.
- In addition to the Diablos Rojos, Piratas and Guerreros teams, he also played with the Tecolotes de Nuevo Laredo during his 26 seasons in Mexican professional baseball.

== Awards and recognitions ==
In 2001, the Nelson Barrera Romellón Stadium, a 6,000-seat ballpark based in Campeche, was inaugurated. In 2003, Barrera was elected to the Mexican Professional Baseball Hall of Fame. In 2007, Barrera was elected to the Caribbean Baseball Hall of Fame.

In 2020, Barrera was selected as the third baseman on the Mexican League Historic Ideal Team by a committee of baseball journalists and historians.

In February 2025, Barrera was selected by a committee of journalists as the third baseman for the Mexican League Centennial All-Time Team on the occasion of the league's hundredth anniversary.
