= Bob Fallon =

American baseball player (born 1960)

- Pitcher
- Born: February 18, 1960 (age 66); The Bronx, New York, U.S.
- Batted: Left Threw: Left

MLB debut
- April 26, 1984, for the Chicago White Sox

Last MLB appearance
- June 23, 1985, for the Chicago White Sox

MLB statistics
- Win–loss record: 0–0
- Earned run average: 4.99
- Strikeouts: 27
- Stats at Baseball Reference

Teams
- Chicago White Sox (1984–1985)

Robert Joseph Fallon (born February 18, 1960) is an American former Major League Baseball pitcher. He played for two seasons at the major league level for the Chicago White Sox.

Fallon played baseball at Hollywood Hills High School in Hollywood, Florida where he was teammates with Bill Lindsey, who would also go on to play for the White Sox.

The White Sox drafted him in the 1st round (15th pick) of the secondary phase of the 1979 amateur draft. Fallon played his first professional season with their Class-A (Short Season) Niagara Falls Pirates in 1979, and his last with the Detroit Tigers' Double-A Glens Falls Tigers and Triple-A Nashville Sounds in 1986.
