= LaMarr Hoyt =

American baseball player (1955–2021)

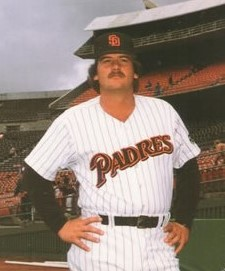
- Hoyt with the San Diego Padres in 1985
- Pitcher
- Born: January 1, 1955; Columbia, South Carolina, U.S.
- Died: November 29, 2021 (aged 66); Columbia, South Carolina, U.S.
- Batted: Right Threw: Right

MLB debut
- September 14, 1979, for the Chicago White Sox

Last MLB appearance
- October 3, 1986, for the San Diego Padres

MLB statistics
- Win–loss record: 98–68
- Earned run average: 3.99
- Strikeouts: 681
- Stats at Baseball Reference

Teams
- Chicago White Sox (1979–1984); San Diego Padres (1985–1986)

Career highlights and awards
- All-Star (1985); AL Cy Young Award (1983); 2× AL wins leader (1982, 1983)

Dewey LaMarr Hoyt Jr. (January 1, 1955 – November 29, 2021) was an American professional baseball right-handed pitcher. He played in Major League Baseball for the Chicago White Sox and San Diego Padres from 1979 to 1986. He won the 1983 American League Cy Young Award and was an All-Star in 1985.

== Early career ==
Hoyt graduated from Keenan High School in Columbia, South Carolina. The New York Yankees selected Hoyt in the fifth round of the 1973 Major League Baseball draft. In 1977, the Yankees traded Hoyt with fellow pitching prospect Bob Polinsky, outfielder Oscar Gamble, and $200,000 to the Chicago White Sox for shortstop Bucky Dent.

== Chicago White Sox ==
Hoyt was promoted to the major leagues for the first time in September 1979. A relief pitcher when he made the White Sox to stay in 1980, Hoyt was switched to the starting rotation in 1982 and tied a club record by winning his first nine decisions. The record was first set by Lefty Williams in 1917 and equaled by Orval Grove in 1943. Hoyt ended up leading the American League with 19 wins.

In 1983, Hoyt won the American League Cy Young Award. He had a 24–10 won-lost record, 3.66 earned run average and 11 complete games while allowing only 31 walks in 260 2/3 innings. Hoyt finished the season with a 15–2 record and 3.16 ERA in his final 18 starts of the season. His 3.66 ERA for the season is the highest to win a Cy Young Award in MLB history. He pitched a complete game victory over the Baltimore Orioles in the first game of the 1983 American League Championship Series, giving up only one run on five hits with no walks.

The White Sox faltered in 1984, as Hoyt's record fell to 13–18 with a 4.47 ERA. He went from winning the most games in the American League in 1983 to losing the most games the following year.

== San Diego Padres ==
After the 1984 season, the San Diego Padres traded Ozzie Guillén, Tim Lollar, Bill Long, and Luis Salazar to the White Sox for Hoyt, Kevin Kristan, and Todd Simmons. He was targeted by Padres general manager Jack McKeon to bolster their starting rotation, which struggled in the 1984 World Series. Hoyt made the National League's All-Star team his first season in the league, and was named the starting pitcher for the game. He gave up one run in three innings of work to earn the win and the Major League Baseball All-Star Game Most Valuable Player Award. For the season, he went 16–8 with a 3.47 ERA. Baseball writer Bill James said Hoyt had the best control of any National League pitcher at this time.

Following the 1985 season, he was arrested twice within a month (between January and February 1986) on drug-possession charges, checking into a rehabilitation program nine days after the second arrest. This prevented him from playing most of spring training. He pitched through an injury to his rotator cuff rather than risk a surgery that could end his career, and he logged an 8–11 won-loss record with a 5.15 ERA.

Barely a month after the season ended, Hoyt was arrested again for drug possession when he tried to bring 500 pills through the San Ysidro Port of Entry on the U.S.–Mexico border. He was sentenced to 45 days in jail on December 16, 1986, and suspended by Commissioner Peter Ueberroth on February 25, 1987. An arbitrator reduced his suspension to sixty days in mid-June and ordered the Padres to reinstate him. Though the Padres still owed Hoyt $3 million under the terms of his contract, the team gave him his unconditional release the following day.

== Later career ==
The White Sox gave him a second chance, signing him after his San Diego release and giving him time to get back into shape. A fourth arrest on drug charges in December 1987 ended his return. He was sentenced to one year in federal prison in January 1988. He began to serve his sentence at Federal Correctional Complex, Allenwood, and was transferred in July to a halfway house in Columbia, South Carolina.

== Career stats ==
W	L	Pct.	ERA	G	GS	CG	SHO	SV	IP	H	R	ER	HR	BB	K	WP	HBP	BAA	Fld%	Avg.	WHIP
98	68	.590	3.99	244	172	48	8	10	1311.1	1313	637	582	140	279	681	13	18	.260	.968	.091	1.214

== Personal life ==
Hoyt's parents divorced when he was six months old, and he was raised by an aunt. Hoyt and his wife, Sylvia, married in 1980. They divorced after the 1985 season. Hoyt and his second wife, Leslie, had two sons and a daughter.

Hoyt died of cancer on November 29, 2021, at the age of 66.
