= Juan Agosto =

Puerto Rican baseball player (born 1958)

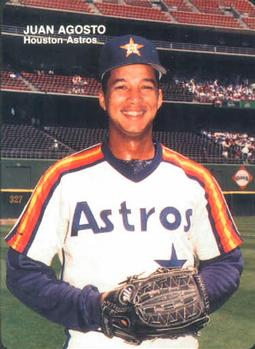
- Relief pitcher
- Born: February 23, 1958 (age 67); Río Piedras, Puerto Rico
- Batted: Left Threw: Left

MLB debut
- September 7, 1981, for the Chicago White Sox

Last MLB appearance
- June 19, 1993, for the Houston Astros

MLB statistics
- Win–loss record: 40–33
- Earned run average: 4.01
- Strikeouts: 307
- Stats at Baseball Reference

Teams
- Chicago White Sox (1981–1986); Minnesota Twins (1986); Houston Astros (1987–1990); St. Louis Cardinals (1991–1992); Seattle Mariners (1992); Houston Astros (1993)

Juan Roberto Agosto Gonzalez (born February 23, 1958) is a Puerto Rican former relief pitcher who played for the Chicago White Sox, Minnesota Twins, Houston Astros, St. Louis Cardinals and the Seattle Mariners of Major League Baseball (MLB). In 13 seasons, Agosto had 40 wins, 33 losses, and a 4.01 earned run average (ERA).

== Professional career ==
Juan Agosto was originally signed by the Boston Red Sox as an amateur free agent in 1974 and released in 1978. On January 18, 1980 he was signed by the Chicago White Sox. He debuted with the White Sox on September 7, 1981, a loss to the Seattle Mariners. Agosto entered the game in the top of the 2nd inning, relieving Richard Dotson after Dotson gave up five runs in the inning. He was with the White Sox when they won the 1983 American League West, and briefly pitched for them in the ALCS.

In six seasons with the White Sox, he went 8–8 with a 3.87 ERA in 154 games." In 1985, Agosto represented Puerto Rico in the Caribbean Series. The White Sox avoided arbitration with him that preseason by signing him to a one-year extension. Agosto was traded to the Minnesota Twins for Pete Filson in June 1986 and assigned to Minnesota's minor league affiliate in Toledo.

He signed with the Houston Astros for the 1987 season. In 1988, Agosto led the major leagues with a ten-game winning streak, the longest in Astros history at the time. Agosto led the National League in appearances with 82 in 1990. In his four seasons with the Astros, Agosto pitched in 261 games.

After the 1990 season, Agosto became a free agent and signed a three-year contract with the St. Louis Cardinals The Cardinals released him in 1992 and the Seattle Mariners signed him in June of that year. Seattle sent Agosto to the minor leagues in August 1992. He was recalled to the team in September.

Before the 1996 season, the California Angels waived Agosto. He attempted to earn a bullpen slot with the Kansas City Royals in 1997, but he was cut during spring training after posting a 7.11 ERA.

Agosto threw a sinker, a curveball, and a screwball.

He and his first wife have one daughter.

== See also ==
- Houston Astros award winners and league leaders
- List of Major League Baseball players from Puerto Rico
