= 1982 Toronto Blue Jays season =

1982 Toronto Blue Jays
- League: American League
- Division: East
- Ballpark: Exhibition Stadium
- City: Toronto
- Record: 78–84 (.481)
- Divisional place: 7th
- Owners: Labatt Breweries, Imperial Trust, Canadian Imperial Bank of Commerce
- General managers: Pat Gillick
- Managers: Bobby Cox
- Television: CTV Television Network (Don Chevrier, Tony Kubek, Fergie Olver)
- Radio: CJCL (AM) (Jerry Howarth, Tom Cheek)

The 1982 Toronto Blue Jays season was the franchise's sixth season of Major League Baseball. Although the Blue Jays once again finished last in the seven team American League East (due to losing a tie-breaker to Cleveland) their record of 78 wins and 84 losses was by far the best in team history to date. Toronto finished 17 games behind the American League Champion Milwaukee Brewers. Bobby Cox became the third field manager in team history.

Dave Stieb established himself as one of the top pitchers in the American League, as he led the AL with 19 complete games and 5 shutouts.

== Offseason ==
=== Transactions ===
Transactions by the Toronto Blue Jays during the off-season before the 1982 season.

==== October 1981 ====
October 31	Signed amateur free agent José Mesa.

==== November 1981 ====
November 13	Buck Martinez granted free agency.
November 27	Acquired Aurelio Rodríguez from the New York Yankees for a player to be named later (Mike Lebo on December 9, 1981).

==== December 1981 ====
December 6	Re-signed free agent Buck Martinez.
December 7	Drafted Jim Gott from the St. Louis Cardinals in the 1981 MLB Rule 5 draft. Drafted Tony Johnson from the Montreal Expos in the 1981 MLB Rule 5 draft. Domingo Ramos drafted by the Seattle Mariners in the 1981 MLB Rule 5 draft.
December 8	Drafted Gibson Alba from the St. Louis Cardinals in the 1981 Minor League draft. Signed amateur free agent Alexis Infante.
December 28	Traded Paul Mirabella to the Chicago Cubs for a player to be named later (Dave Geisel on March 25, 1982). Acquired Hosken Powell from the Minnesota Twins for a player to be named later (Greg Wells on January 18, 1982).

==== January 1982 ====
January 28	Released Steve Baker.

==== March 1982 ====
March 25	Signed free agent Glenn Adams from the Minnesota Twins to a contract. Acquired Rance Mulliniks from the Kansas City Royals for Phil Huffman.
March 28	Released Juan Berenguer. Released Ted Cox. Released Nino Espinosa.

==== April 1982 ====
April 2	Acquired Wayne Nordhagen from the Chicago White Sox for Aurelio Rodríguez.

== Regular season ==
One of the key events of the season was that the Toronto Blue Jays sold its first beer. Exhibition Stadium was the only stadium in the major leagues that did not sell beer. The Ontario Legislature reached a decision on July 7, 1982. Dr. Robert Elgie, the minister of Consumer and Commercial Relations announced that beer would be sold on a trial basis at Exhibition Stadium.

The decision also applied to Hamilton's Ivor Wynne Stadium and Ottawa's Lansdowne Park, which along with Exhibition Stadium were previously the only Canadian Football League stadiums to not offer beer, but not to Maple Leaf Gardens, which would not be permitted to sell beer until the middle of the 1992-93 NHL season. On July 30, 1982, Paul Godfrey sold the first ceremonial beer at Exhibition Stadium to William Turner, a fan from London, Ontario.

=== Opening Day lineup ===
- Jesse Barfield
- Mark Bomback
- Dámaso García
- Alfredo Griffin
- John Mayberry
- Lloyd Moseby
- Rance Mulliniks
- Willie Upshaw
- Ernie Whitt
- Al Woods

=== Season standings ===
AL East
Team	W	L	Pct.	GB	Home	Road
Milwaukee Brewers	95	67	.586	—	48‍–‍34	47‍–‍33
Baltimore Orioles	94	68	.580	1	53‍–‍28	41‍–‍40
Boston Red Sox	89	73	.549	6	49‍–‍32	40‍–‍41
Detroit Tigers	83	79	.512	12	47‍–‍34	36‍–‍45
New York Yankees	79	83	.488	16	42‍–‍39	37‍–‍44
Cleveland Indians	78	84	.481	17	41‍–‍40	37‍–‍44
Toronto Blue Jays	78	84	.481	17	44‍–‍37	34‍–‍47

=== Record vs. opponents ===
1982 American League record Sources:
Team	BAL	BOS	CAL	CWS	CLE	DET	KC	MIL	MIN	NYY	OAK	SEA	TEX	TOR
Baltimore	—	4–9	7–5	5–7	6–7	7–6	4–8	9–4–1	8–4	11–2	7–5	7–5	9–3	10–3
Boston	9–4	—	7–5	4–8	6–7	8–5	6–6	4–9	6–6	7–6	8–4	7–5	10–2	7–6
California	5–7	5–7	—	8–5	8–4	5–7	7–6	6–6	7–6	7–5	9–4	10–3	8–5	8–4
Chicago	7–5	8–4	5–8	—	6–6	9–3	3–10	3–9	7–6	8–4	9–4	6–7	8–5	8–4
Cleveland	7–6	7–6	4–8	6–6	—	6–7	2–10	7–6	8–4	4–9	4–8	9–3	7–5	7–6
Detroit	6–7	5–8	7–5	3–9	7–6	—	6–6	3–10	9–3	8–5	9–3	6–6	8–4	6–7
Kansas City	8–4	6–6	6–7	10–3	10–2	6–6	—	7–5	7–6	5–7	7–6	7–6	7–6	4–8
Milwaukee	4–9–1	9–4	6–6	9–3	6–7	10–3	5–7	—	7–5	8–5	7–5	8–4	7–5	9–4
Minnesota	4–8	6–6	6–7	6–7	4–8	3–9	6–7	5–7	—	2–10	3–10	5–8	5–8	5–7
New York	2–11	6–7	5–7	4–8	9–4	5–8	7–5	5–8	10–2	—	7–5	6–6	7–5	6–7
Oakland	5–7	4–8	4–9	4–9	8–4	3–9	6–7	5–7	10–3	5–7	—	6–7	5–8	3–9
Seattle	5–7	5–7	3–10	7–6	3–9	6–6	6–7	4–8	8–5	6–6	7–6	—	9–4	7–5
Texas	3–9	2–10	5–8	5–8	5–7	4–8	6–7	5–7	8–5	5–7	8–5	4–9	—	4–8
Toronto	3–10	6–7	4–8	4–8	6–7	7–6	8–4	4–9	7–5	7–6	9–3	5–7	8–4	—

=== Transactions ===
Transactions for the Toronto Blue Jays during the 1982 regular season.

==== April 1982 ====
April 8	Released Dave Tomlin.

==== May 1982 ====
May 5	Acquired Tom Dodd, Dave Revering and Jeff Reynolds from the New York Yankees for John Mayberry.

==== June 1982 ====
June 15	Acquired Dick Davis from the Philadelphia Phillies for Wayne Nordhagen.
June 22	Traded Dick Davis to the Pittsburgh Pirates for a player to be named later (Wayne Nordhagen on June 25, 1982).

==== July 1982 ====
July 15	Purchased Leon Roberts from the Texas Rangers.

==== August 1982 ====
August 2	Dave Revering granted free agency.
August 23	Sold the player rights of Pedro Hernández to the New York Yankees.
August 30	Released Ken Schrom.

==== September 1982 ====
September 7	Released Otto Velez.

=== Roster ===
1982 Toronto Blue Jays
Roster
Pitchers: 17 Mark Bomback; 18 Jim Clancy; 28 Mark Eichhorn; 36 Jerry Garvin; 35 Dave Geisel; 38 Jim Gott; 25 Roy Lee Jackson; 48 Luis Leal; 50 Joey McLaughlin; 33 Dale Murray; 31,21 Ken Schrom; 34 Steve Senteney; 37 Dave Stieb	Catchers: 13 Buck Martinez; 14 Geno Petralli; 12 Ernie Whitt; Infielders: 31 Dave Baker; 7 Dámaso García; 4 Alfredo Griffin; 39 Pedro Hernández; 16 Garth Iorg; 5 Rance Mulliniks; 26 Willie Upshaw	Outfielders: 29 Jesse Barfield; 9 Barry Bonnell; 35 Dick Davis; 45 Tony Johnson; 15 Lloyd Moseby; 22 Hosken Powell; 20 Al Woods; Other batters: 55 Glenn Adams; 10 John Mayberry; 30,3 Wayne Nordhagen; 10 Dave Revering; 3 Leon Roberts; 19 Otto Vélez	Manager: 6 Bobby Cox; Coaches: 43 Cito Gaston (hitting/first base); 8 John Sullivan (bullpen); 41 Al Widmar (pitching); 24 Jimy Williams (third base)

=== Game log ===
1982 Game Log
April: 8–12 (Home: 5–6; Away: 3–6)

#	Date	Opponent	Score	Win	Loss	Save	Attendance	Record
--	April 6	@ Tigers	Postponed (snow) Rescheduled for April 7					
--	April 7	@ Tigers	Postponed (snow) Rescheduled for April 15					
--	April 8	@ Tigers	Postponed (snow) Rescheduled for August 5					
1	April 9	Brewers	4–15	Vuckovich (1–0)	Bomback (0–1)		30,216	0–1
2	April 10	Brewers	3–2 (10)	Jackson (1–0)	Fingers (0–1)		11,141	1–1
3	April 11	Brewers	5–14	McClure (1–0)	Clancy (0–1)		10,128	1–2
4	April 12	Tigers	9–5	Leal (1–0)	Wilcox (0–1)		11,180	2–2
5	April 13	Tigers	2–4	Morris (1–1)	Murray (0–1)		10,087	2–3
6	April 14	Tigers	5–4	Jackson (2–0)	Saucier (0–1)		10,114	3–3
7	April 15	@ Tigers	2–4	Saucier (1–1)	Stieb (0–1)	Sosa (1)	51,038	3–4
8	April 16	@ Red Sox	2–0	Leal (2–0)	Eckersley (1–1)	Jackson (1)	7,542	4–4
9	April 17	@ Red Sox	4–5	Tudor (2–0)	Bomback (0–2)	Clear (1)	18,617	4–5
10	April 18	@ Red Sox	3–4	Aponte (1–0)	Jackson (2–1)		18,017	4–6
11	April 19	@ Red Sox	5–4	Murray (1–1)	Clear (0–1)		27,265	5–6
--	April 20	@ Brewers	Postponed (cold weather) Rescheduled for August 12					
12	April 21	@ Brewers	1–3	Lerch (1–0)	Leal (2–1)	Fingers (1)	5,298	5–7
13	April 22	@ Brewers	0–7	Caldwell (1–1)	Bomback (0–3)		6,199	5–8
14	April 23	Red Sox	4–5	Tudor (3–0)	Clancy (0–2)	Clear (3)	10,428	5–9
15	April 24	Red Sox	7–8	Torrez (1–1)	Stieb (0–2)	Aponte (2)	13,135	5–10
16	April 25	Red Sox	4–5 (12)	Clear (1–1)	McLaughlin (0–1)		21,043	5–11
17	April 27	Rangers	8–4	Murray (2–1)	Medich (1–2)		10,101	6–11
18	April 28	Rangers	6–4	Clancy (1–2)	Tanana (1–3)	McLaughlin (1)	10,109	7–11
19	April 29	@ Royals	7–0	Stieb (1–2)	Splittorff (1–1)		15,707	8–11
20	April 30	@ Royals	7–8	Jackson (2–0)	Jackson (2–2)	Quisenberry (6)	19,030	8–12

May: 13–14 (Home: 6–5; Away: 7–9)

#	Date	Opponent	Score	Win	Loss	Save	Attendance	Record
21	May 1	@ Royals	7–8	Jackson (3–0)	Bomback (0–4)	Quisenberry (7)	23,561	8–13
22	May 2	@ Royals	7–5	Clancy (2–2)	Leonard (2–2)	Jackson (2)	27,044	9–13
23	May 4	@ White Sox	3–4	Burns (3–1)	Stieb (1–3)	Barojas (7)	9,543	9–14
24	May 5	@ White Sox	1–4	Trout (2–2)	Leal (2–2)	Lamp (1)	20,673	9–15
25	May 7	Royals	6–4	McLaughlin (1–1)	Leonard (2–3)		11,523	10–15
26	May 8	Royals	2–1	Bomback (1–4)	Frost (3–2)	Jackson (3)	15,102	11–15
27	May 9	Royals	2–0	Stieb (2–3)	Splittorff (2–2)		17,044	12–15
28	May 10	White Sox	3–6	Burns (4–1)	McLaughlin (1–2)	Hickey (1)	11,520	12–16
29	May 11	White Sox	9–4	Clancy (3–2)	Trout (2–3)		10,700	13–16
30	May 12	White Sox	2–9	Lamp (3–0)	Bomback (1–5)		11,473	13–17
31	May 13	@ Rangers	3–4	Darwin (3–1)	Stieb (2–4)		6,819	13–18
32	May 14	@ Rangers	3–4 (11)	Mirabella (1–0)	Jackson (2–3)		10,972	13–19
33	May 15	@ Rangers	5–2	Clancy (4–2)	Tanana (1–5)		14,405	14–19
34	May 16	@ Rangers	1–2 (10)	Darwin (4–1)	Jackson (2–4)		29,303	14–20
35	May 18	@ Indians	5–6	Spillner (1–3)	Murray (2–2)		5,865	14–21
36	May 19	@ Indians	8–5	Garvin (1–0)	Barker (4–2)	McLaughlin (2)	5,724	15–21
37	May 20	@ Indians	2–0	Clancy (5–2)	Sorensen (3–3)		6,226	16–21
38	May 21	Orioles	0–3	Flanagan (2–4)	Gott (0–1)	Martinez (3)	12,387	16–22
39	May 22	Orioles	0–6	Martínez (4–3)	Stieb (2–5)		17,457	16–23
40	May 23	Orioles	7–1	Leal (3–2)	Stewart (4–3)		14,229	17–23
41	May 24	Orioles	5–7	McGregor (6–3)	Clancy (5–3)	Stoddard (3)	12,088	17–24
42	May 25	@ Yankees	0–8	John (4–4)	Gott (0–2)		20,127	17–25
43	May 26	@ Yankees	7–0	Stieb (3–5)	May (1–3)		15,090	18–25
--	May 28	@ Orioles	Postponed (rain) Rescheduled for May 29					
44	May 29	@ Orioles	1–3	Flanagan (3–4)	Leal (3–3)			18–26
45	May 29	@ Orioles	11–10	McLaughlin (2–2)	Stoddard (0–2)		21,241	19–26
46	May 30	@ Orioles	6–0	Gott (1–2)	Palmer (2–3)	Jackson (4)	21,632	20–26
47	May 31	Yankees	5–4	Stieb (4–5)	Erickson (4–5)		20,136	21–26

June: 12–14 (Home: 7–10; Away: 5–4)

#	Date	Opponent	Score	Win	Loss	Save	Attendance	Record
48	June 1	Yankees	5–2	Murray (3–2)	Rawley (3–2)		17,460	22–26
49	June 2	Yankees	6–12 (13)	Rawley (4–2)	McLaughlin (2–3)		20,161	22–27
50	June 3	Yankees	3–1	Leal (4–3)	John (4–5)		20,147	23–27
51	June 4	Indians	3–6	Barker (7–2)	Murray (3–3)	Spillner (6)	12,371	23–28
--	June 5	Indians	Postponed (rain) Rescheduled for August 17					
52	June 6	Indians	5–1	Stieb (5–5)	Sorensen (5–4)			24–28
53	June 6	Indians	5–7	Glynn (2–0)	Garvin (1–1)	Spillner (7)	17,131	24–29
54	June 7	Indians	7–3	Leal (5–3)	Denny (3–6)		11,150	25–29
55	June 8	Angels	4–11	Zahn (6–2)	Gott (1–3)		16,154	25–30
56	June 9	Angels	5–4	McLaughlin (3–3)	Corbett (1–6)		16,193	26–30
57	June 11	Athletics	2–1	Clancy (6–3)	Kingman (0–1)		17,461	27–30
58	June 12	Athletics	1–8	Langford (5–7)	Stieb (5–6)		24,338	27–31
59	June 13	Athletics	5–7	Underwood (3–4)	Jackson (2–5)	Beard (4)	20,113	27–32
60	June 14	Athletics	2–4	Keough (6–7)	Gott (1–4)	Beard (5)	14,136	27–33
61	June 15	@ Angels	2–0	Clancy (7–3)	Witt (3–1)		23,217	28–33
62	June 16	@ Angels	1–7	Renko (6–1)	Stieb (5–7)		20,970	28–34
63	June 17	@ Angels	8–10	Kison (6–2)	Leal (5–4)	Moreno (1)	21,195	28–35
64	June 18	@ Athletics	6–4	McLaughlin (4–3)	Keough (6–8)		12,061	29–35
65	June 19	@ Athletics	3–1 (12)	McLaughlin (5–3)	Owchinko (1–1)		19,214	30–35
66	June 20	@ Athletics	3–2	Stieb (6–7)	Langford (5–8)		26,096	31–35
67	June 21	@ Mariners	4–5	Moore (3–6)	Leal (5–5)	Caudill (10)	7,486	31–36
68	June 22	@ Mariners	5–6	Clark (1–0)	Jackson (2–6)	Caudill (11)	7,933	31–37
69	June 23	@ Mariners	5–3 (11)	McLaughlin (6–3)	Stanton (1–1)		9,007	32–37
--	June 25	Twins	Postponed (rain) Rescheduled for September 28					
70	June 26	Twins	3–4	Davis (2–7)	Stieb (6–8)		14,052	32–38
71	June 27	Twins	3–2	McLaughlin (7–3)	Felton (0–8)		20,074	33–38
72	June 29	Mariners	1–4	Bannister (7–4)	Clancy (7–4)	Stanton (5)	13,097	33–39
73	June 30	Mariners	4–10	Beattie (6–4)	Stieb (6–9)		12,339	33–40

July: 15–12 (Home: 9–4; Away: 6–8)

#	Date	Opponent	Score	Win	Loss	Save	Attendance	Record
74	July 1	Mariners	3–4	Perry (6–7)	Leal (5–6)	Caudill (14)	21,004	33–41
75	July 2	@ Twins	9–4	Murray (4–3)	Havens (3–6)	McLaughlin (3)	7,503	34–41
76	July 3	@ Twins	1–2	O'Connor (1–2)	Clancy (7–5)		9,591	34–42
77	July 4	@ Twins	3–4	Little (1–0)	Stieb (6–10)		6,532	34–43
78	July 5	@ Rangers	2–3	Matlack (4–5)	Leal (5–7)	Darwin (4)	29,126	34–44
79	July 6	@ Rangers	4–3	Murray (5–3)	Tanana (4–10)		9,657	35–44
80	July 7	@ Royals	1–3	Gura (10–4)	Clancy (7–6)		22,217	35–45
81	July 8	@ Royals	5–4	Stieb (7–10)	Armstrong (2–3)	McLaughlin (4)	24,409	36–45
82	July 9	White Sox	7–6	Murray (6–3)	Dotson (3–10)	McLaughlin (5)	15,131	37–45
83	July 10	White Sox	5–6	Escárrega (1–1)	Gott (1–5)	Hickey (4)	17,035	37–46
84	July 11	White Sox	7–16	Burns (9–4)	Clancy (7–7)		16,169	37–47
85	July 15	Rangers	5–1	Stieb (8–10)	Honeycutt (4–10)		14,123	38–47
86	July 16	Rangers	6–0	Clancy (8–7)	Hough (7–8)		13,359	39–47
87	July 17	Rangers	11–3	Jackson (3–6)	Butcher (0–1)		17,080	40–47
88	July 18	Rangers	5–4 (10)	McLaughlin (8–3)	Darwin (6–4)		15,512	41–47
89	July 19	Royals	4–2	Leal (6–7)	Black (3–3)		16,466	42–47
90	July 20	Royals	9–2	Stieb (9–10)	Gura (10–7)		18,552	43–47
91	July 21	Royals	7–9	Blue (7–7)	Clancy (8–8)	Quisenberry (23)	19,152	43–48
92	July 22	@ White Sox	2–3	Burns (10–4)	McLaughlin (8–4)		21,875	43–49
93	July 23	@ White Sox	7–1	Leal (7–7)	Barnes (0–2)	Jackson (5)	27,770	44–49
94	July 24	@ White Sox	8–1	Stieb (10–10)	Lamp (7–5)	Murray (1)	21,821	45–49
95	July 25	@ White Sox	3–5	Hoyt (12–9)	Clancy (8–9)		17,452	45–50
96	July 26	@ Red Sox	2–3	Eckersley (11–8)	Gott (1–6)		22,261	45–51
97	July 27	@ Red Sox	3–1	Leal (8–7)	Tudor (6–8)		27,077	46–51
98	July 28	@ Red Sox	7–9	Ojeda (4–5)	Jackson (3–7)	Stanley (8)	18,627	46–52
99	July 30	Tigers	6–5 (12)	Murray (7–3)	James (0–2)		18,262	47–52
100	July 31	Tigers	1–0 (10)	Gott (2–6)	Rucker (1–1)		21,007	48–52

August: 13–20 (Home: 7–8; Away: 6–12)

#	Date	Opponent	Score	Win	Loss	Save	Attendance	Record
101	August 1	Tigers	5–8	Morris (12–11)	Leal (8–8)	Tobik (5)	23,033	48–53
102	August 2	Brewers	9–4	Stieb (11–10)	McClure (8–4)		20,141	49–53
103	August 3	Brewers	4–7	Vuckovich (12–4)	Clancy (8–10)	Fingers (24)	16,575	49–54
104	August 4	Brewers	0–8	Caldwell (9–10)	Gott (2–7)		17,521	49–55
105	August 5	@ Tigers	2–5	Ujdur (5–5)	Leal (8–9)			49–56
106	August 5	@ Tigers	4–7	Rucker (2–1)	Jackson (3–8)	Tobik (6)	26,010	49–57
107	August 6	@ Tigers	0–6	Morris (13–11)	Stieb (11–11)		21,602	49–58
108	August 7	@ Tigers	7–4	Clancy (9–10)	Pashnick (3–4)	Murray (2)	20,608	50–58
109	August 8	@ Tigers	7–4	Gott (3–7)	Underwood (3–8)	McLaughlin (6)		51–58
110	August 8	@ Tigers	7–4	Geisel (1–0)	Rucker (2–2)	Murray (3)	23,550	52–58
111	August 9	Red Sox	4–2	Schrom (1–0)	Eckersley (11–10)	McLaughlin (7)	20,105	53–58
112	August 10	Red Sox	4–0	Stieb (12–11)	Torrez (7–7)		21,324	54–58
113	August 11	Red Sox	4–3	Jackson (4–8)	Stanley (7–5)		22,012	55–58
114	August 12	@ Brewers	1–7	McClure (9–4)	Gott (3–8)			55–59
115	August 12	@ Brewers	3–4	Lerch (8–7)	Murray (7–4)	Fingers (27)	28,305	55–60
116	August 13	@ Brewers	1–3	Vuckovich (13–4)	Leal (8–10)		49,064	55–61
117	August 14	@ Brewers	4–2	Stieb (13–11)	Caldwell (10–11)		28,940	56–61
118	August 15	@ Brewers	3–2	Clancy (10–10)	Slaton (9–4)	Murray (4)	26,180	57–61
119	August 16	Indians	2–1	Gott (4–8)	Waits (1–12)	McLaughlin (8)	17,704	58–61
120	August 17	Indians	5–6	Spillner (9–7)	McLaughlin (8–5)			58–62
121	August 17	Indians	5–9	Sutcliffe (10–4)	Geisel (1–1)		26,636	58–63
122	August 20	@ Yankees	2–4	Rawley (7–8)	Stieb (13–12)	Gossage (26)	20,172	58–64
123	August 21	@ Yankees	3–1	Clancy (11–10)	Guidry (11–5)	Murray (5)	24,029	59–64
124	August 22	@ Yankees	1–3	Righetti (8–5)	Gott (4–9)	Gossage (27)	33,692	59–65
125	August 23	@ Yankees	3–4	LaRoche (4–1)	Leal (8–11)	Gossage (28)	16,565	59–66
126	August 24	@ Orioles	3–7 (10)	Martínez (12–10)	McLaughlin (8–6)		12,139	59–67
127	August 25	@ Orioles	3–8	Flanagan (10–10)	Clancy (11–11)		11,712	59–68
128	August 26	@ Orioles	5–12	Davis (4–3)	Gott (4–10)		21,471	59–69
129	August 27	Yankees	10–3	Leal (9–11)	Righetti (8–6)		28,438	60–69
130	August 28	Yankees	3–2 (11)	Murray (8–4)	LaRoche (4–2)		35,065	61–69
131	August 29	Yankees	2–8	John (10–10)	Clancy (11–12)		34,313	61–70
132	August 30	Orioles	3–6	Davis (5–3)	Eichhorn (0–1)	Martinez (12)	14,091	61–71
133	August 31	Orioles	0–1	Palmer (12–3)	Leal (9–12)		14,690	61–72

September: 14–12 (Home: 7–4; Away: 7–8)

#	Date	Opponent	Score	Win	Loss	Save	Attendance	Record
134	September 1	Orioles	2–5	Martínez (14–10)	Stieb (13–13)		12,473	61–73
135	September 3	@ Indians	2–3	Anderson (2–2)	Clancy (11–13)	Brennan (2)	12,131	61–74
136	September 4	@ Indians	3–4	Brennan (1–2)	Murray (8–5)	Spillner (17)	6,110	61–75
137	September 5	@ Indians	6–5	Leal (10–12)	Barker (12–11)	Murray (6)	6,968	62–75
138	September 6	@ Athletics	3–1	Stieb (14–13)	Kingman (3–11)		20,172	63–75
139	September 7	@ Athletics	2–1	Clancy (12–13)	D'Acquisto (0–1)	Murray (7)	8,403	64–75
140	September 8	@ Athletics	6–5	Jackson (5–8)	Conroy (0–1)	Murray (8)	10,786	65–75
141	September 10	@ Angels	2–6	Zahn (16–7)	Leal (10–13)		25,012	65–76
142	September 11	@ Angels	1–4	Forsch (12–10)	Stieb (14–14)		43,819	65–77
143	September 12	@ Angels	2–3	John (12–11)	Clancy (12–14)	Curtis (1)	25,394	65–78
--	September 14	Athletics	Postponed (rain) Rescheduled for September 15					
144	September 15	Athletics	3–2	Leal (11–13)	Conroy (0–2)	Murray (9)		66–78
145	September 15	Athletics	12–11	Jackson (6–8)	Hanna (0–3)		12,090	67–78
146	September 16	Angels	2–1 (12)	Jackson (7–8)	Sánchez (6–3)		15,693	68–78
147	September 17	Angels	6–2	Clancy (13–14)	John (12–12)	Murray (10)	15,605	69–78
148	September 18	Angels	6–8	Sánchez (7–3)	Murray (8–6)		20,533	69–79
149	September 19	Angels	1–5	Kison (9–5)	Eichhorn (0–2)		22,025	69–80
150	September 20	@ Twins	1–4	Castillo (11–11)	Leal (11–14)	Davis (21)	2,830	69–81
151	September 21	@ Twins	5–1	Stieb (15–14)	Viola (4–8)		3,282	70–81
152	September 22	@ Twins	3–2 (10)	Clancy (14–14)	Havens (9–13)		3,676	71–81
153	September 24	@ Mariners	2–3	Vande Berg (9–4)	Murray (8–7)		14,071	71–82
154	September 25	@ Mariners	0–7	Clark (5–2)	Leal (11–15)		18,818	71–83
155	September 26	@ Mariners	6–2	Stieb (16–14)	Bannister (12–12)		6,742	72–83
156	September 28	Twins	3–0	Clancy (15–14)	Viola (4–9)			73–83
157	September 28	Twins	4–3 (10)	Jackson (8–8)	Davis (3–9)		11,124	74–83
158	September 29	Twins	0–8	Havens (10–13)	Eichhorn (0–3)		10,364	74–84
159	September 30	Twins	6–4	Leal (12–15)	O'Connor (8–9)	Murray (11)	11,076	75–84

October: 3–0 (Home: 3–0; Away: 0–0)

#	Date	Opponent	Score	Win	Loss	Save	Attendance	Record
160	October 1	Mariners	2–0	Stieb (17–14)	Bannister (12–13)		11,171	76–84
161	October 2	Mariners	3–0	Gott (5–10)	Stoddard (3–3)	Jackson (6)	12,472	77–84
162	October 3	Mariners	5–2	Clancy (16–14)	Caudill (12–9)		19,064	78–84

== Player stats ==
=== Starters by position ===
Note: Pos = Position; G = Games played; AB = At bats; R = Runs scored; H = Hits; 2B = Doubles; 3B = Triples; HR = Home runs; RBI = Runs batted in; AVG = Batting average; SB = Stolen bases

Pos	Player	G	AB	R	H	2B	3B	HR	RBI	AVG	SB
C	Ernie Whitt	105	284	28	74	14	2	11	42	.261	3
1B	Willie Upshaw	160	580	77	155	25	7	21	75	.267	8
2B	Damaso Garcia	147	597	89	185	32	3	5	42	.310	54
3B	Garth Iorg	129	417	45	119	20	5	1	36	.285	3
SS	Alfredo Griffin	162	539	57	130	20	8	1	48	.241	10
LF	Barry Bonnell	140	437	59	128	26	3	6	49	.293	14
CF	Lloyd Moseby	147	487	51	115	20	9	9	52	.236	11
RF	Jesse Barfield	139	394	54	97	13	2	18	58	.246	1
DH	Wayne Nordhagen	72	185	12	50	6	0	1	20	.270	0

=== Other batters ===
Note: G = Games played; AB = At bats; R = Runs scored; H = Hits; 2B = Doubles; 3B = Triples; HR = Home runs; RBI = Runs batted in; AVG = Batting average; SB = Stolen bases

Player	G	AB	R	H	2B	3B	HR	RBI	AVG	SB
Rance Mulliniks	112	311	32	76	25	0	4	35	.244	3
Hosken Powell	112	265	43	73	13	4	3	26	.275	4
Buck Martinez	96	260	26	63	17	0	10	37	.242	1
Al Woods	85	201	20	47	11	1	3	24	.234	1
Dave Revering	55	135	15	29	6	0	5	18	.215	0
Leon Roberts	40	105	6	24	4	0	1	5	.229	1
Tony Johnson	70	98	17	23	2	1	3	14	.235	3
Glenn Adams	30	66	2	17	4	0	1	11	.258	0
Otto Velez	28	52	4	10	1	0	1	5	.192	1
Geno Petralli	16	44	3	16	2	0	0	1	.364	0
John Mayberry	17	33	7	9	0	0	2	3	.273	0
Dave Baker	9	20	3	5	1	0	0	2	.250	0
Pedro Hernandez	8	9	1	0	0	0	0	0	.000	0
Dick Davis	3	7	0	2	0	0	0	2	.286	0

=== Pitching ===
Note: W = Wins; L = Losses; ERA = Earned run average; G = Games pitched; GS = Games started; SV = Saves; IP = Innings pitched; R = Runs allowed; ER = Earned runs allowed; BB = Walks allowed; K = Strikeouts

Player	W	L	ERA	G	GS	SV	IP	R	ER	BB	K
Dave Stieb	17	14	3.25	38	38	0	288.1	116	104	75	141
Jim Clancy	16	14	3.71	40	40	0	266.2	122	110	77	139
Luis Leal	12	15	3.93	38	38	0	249.2	113	109	79	111
Joey McLaughlin	8	6	3.21	44	0	8	70.0	27	25	30	49
Dale Murray	8	7	3.16	56	0	11	111.0	48	39	32	60
Roy Lee Jackson	8	8	3.06	48	2	6	97.0	37	33	31	71
Jim Gott	5	10	4.43	30	23	0	136.0	76	67	66	82
Ken Schrom	1	0	5.87	6	0	0	15.1	11	10	15	8
Jerry Garvin	1	1	7.25	32	4	0	58.1	48	47	26	35
Dave Geisel	1	1	3.98	16	2	0	31.2	15	14	17	22
Mark Bomback	1	5	6.03	16	8	0	59.2	44	40	25	22
Steve Senteney	0	0	4.91	11	0	0	22.0	16	12	6	20
Mark Eichhorn	0	3	5.45	7	7	0	38.0	28	23	14	16
Totals	78	84	3.95	162	162	25	1443.0	701	633	493	776

== Award winners ==
- Jim Clancy, American League All-Star Selection, Reserve
- Dámaso García, 2B, Silver Slugger Award
- Dave Stieb, The Sporting News Pitcher of the Year Award
- Dave Stieb, American League Leader, 19 Complete Games
- Dave Stieb, American League Leader, 5 Shutouts

== Farm system ==
Level	Team	League	Manager
AAA	Syracuse Chiefs	International League	Jim Beauchamp
AA	Knoxville Blue Jays	Southern League	Larry Hardy
A	Kinston Eagles	Carolina League	John McLaren
A	Florence Blue Jays	South Atlantic League	Dennis Holmberg
Rookie	GCL Blue Jays	Gulf Coast League	Héctor Torres
Rookie	Medicine Hat Blue Jays	Pioneer League	Duane Larson

LEAGUE CHAMPIONS: Medicine Hat
