= List of Toronto Blue Jays team records =

These are lists of Toronto Blue Jays records from their inception in 1977 through the 2026 season.

== Individual career records ==
=== Career batting ===
Career batting records
Statistic	Player	Record	Blue Jays career	Ref
Batting average	Paul Molitor	.315	1993–1995	
On-base percentage	John Olerud	.395	1989–1996	
Slugging percentage	Carlos Delgado	.556	1993–2004	
OPS	Carlos Delgado	.949	1993–2004	
Games played	Tony Fernández	1,450	1983–1990, 1993, 1998–1999, 2001	
At bats	Vernon Wells	5,470	1999–2010	
Runs	Carlos Delgado	889	1993–2004	
Hits	Tony Fernández	1,583	1983–1990, 1993, 1998–1999, 2001	
Total bases	Carlos Delgado	2,786	1993–2004	
Doubles	Carlos Delgado	343	1993–2004	
Triples	Tony Fernández	72	1983–1990, 1993, 1998–1999, 2001	
Home runs	Carlos Delgado	336	1993–2004	
Runs batted in	Carlos Delgado	1,058	1993–2004	
Walks	Carlos Delgado	827	1993–2004	
Strikeouts	Carlos Delgado	1,242	1993–2004	
Stolen bases	Lloyd Moseby	255	1980–1989	
Caught stealing	Tony Fernández	86	1983–1990, 1993, 1998–1999, 2001	
Singles	Tony Fernández	1,160	1983–1990, 1993, 1998–1999, 2001	
Runs created	Carlos Delgado	1,077	1993–2004	
Extra-base hits	Carlos Delgado	690	1993–2004	
Times on base	Carlos Delgado	2,362	1993–2004	
Hit by pitch	Carlos Delgado	122	1993–2004	
Sacrifice hits	Alfredo Griffin	74	1979–1984, 1992–1993	
Sacrifice flies	Joe Carter	65	1991–1997	
Intentional walks	Carlos Delgado	128	1993–2004	
Grounded into double plays	Vernon Wells	146	1999–2010	
At bats per Strikeout	Bob Bailor	17.6	1977–1980	
At bats per Home run	Carlos Delgado	14.9	1993–2004	

=== Career pitching ===
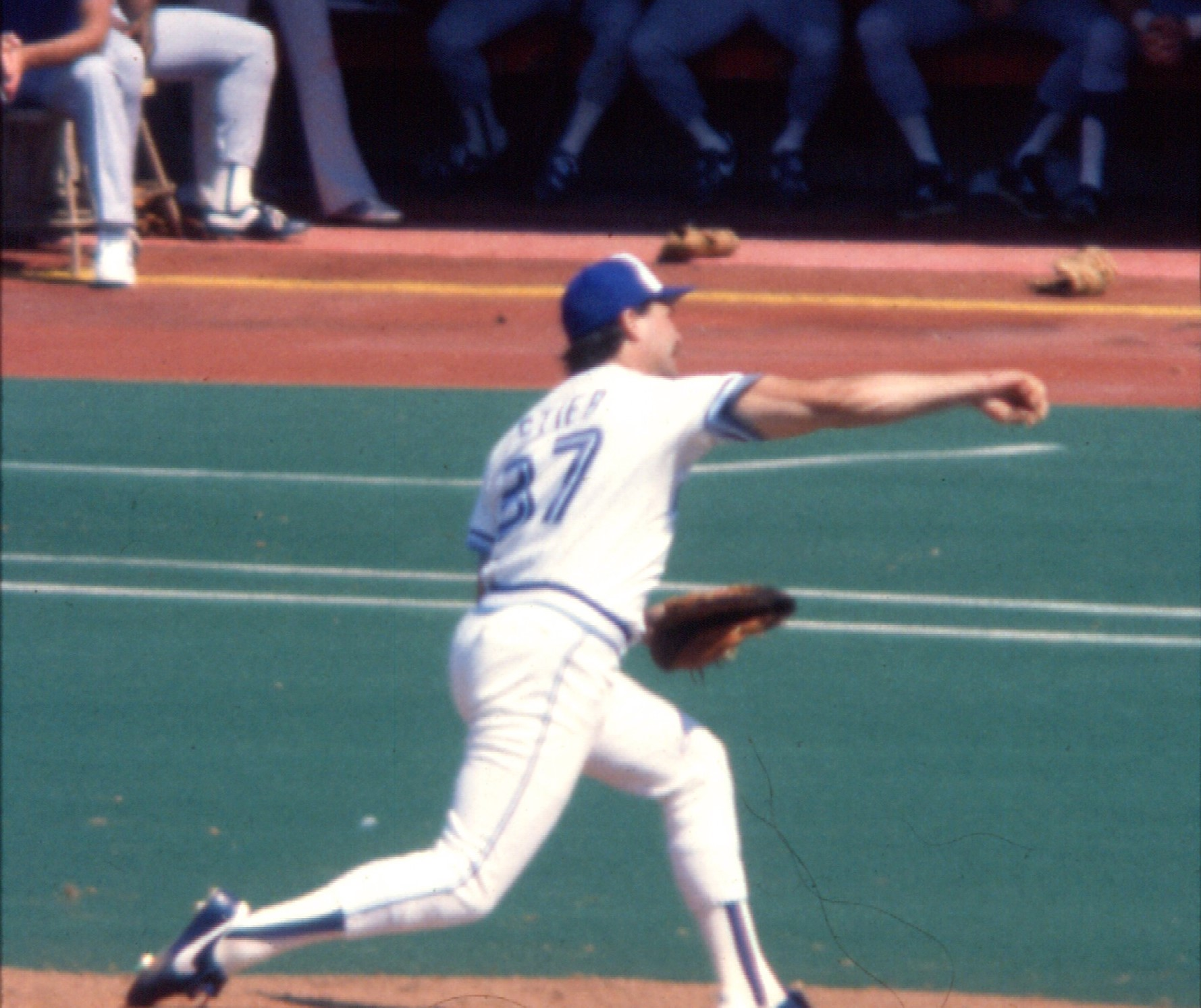
Dave Stieb holds numerous pitching records for Toronto.

Career pitching records
Statistic	Player	Record	Blue Jays career	Ref
Wins	Dave Stieb	175	1979–1992, 1998	
Losses	Jim Clancy	140	1977–1988	
ERA	Dave Stieb	3.42	1979–1992, 1998	
Strikeouts	Dave Stieb	1,658	1979–1992, 1998	
Walks allowed	Dave Stieb	1,020	1979–1992, 1998	
Games	Jason Frasor	505	2004–2012	
Games started	Dave Stieb	408	1979–1992, 1998	
Innings pitched	Dave Stieb	2,873.0	1979–1992, 1998	
Saves	Tom Henke	217	1985–1992	
Consecutive saves converted	Jordan Romano	31	2019–2024	
Complete games	Dave Stieb	103	1979–1992, 1998	
Shutouts	Dave Stieb	30	1979–1992, 1998	
Hits allowed	Dave Stieb	2,545	1979–1992, 1998	
Home runs allowed	Dave Stieb	224	1979–1992, 1998	
Hit batsmen	Dave Stieb	129	1979–1992, 1998	
Runs allowed	Dave Stieb	1,208	1979–1992, 1998	
Earned runs	Dave Stieb	1,091	1979–1992, 1998	
WHIP	Jimmy Key	1.20	1984–1992	
Opponents' batting average (low)	Dave Stieb	.239	1979–1992, 1998	
Opponents' batting average (high)	Todd Stottlemyre	.269	1988–1994	
Balks	Dave Stieb	14	1979–1992, 1998	
Wild pitches	Juan Guzmán	88	1991–1998	
Stolen bases allowed	A. J. Burnett	71	2006–2008	
Caught stealing	Josh Towers	15	2003–2007	
Holds	Scott Downs	90	2005–2010	

=== Career defense ===
Career defensive records
Statistic	Player	Record	Blue Jays career	Ref
Total chances	Carlos Delgado	11,147	1993–2009	
Putouts	Carlos Delgado	10,333	1993–2009	
Assists	Tony Fernández	3,723	1983–1993, 1998–2001	
Errors	Alfredo Griffin	187	1979–1984, 1992–1993	
Double plays turned	Carlos Delgado	1,044	1993–2009	
Passed balls	Ernie Whitt	62	1977–1989	
Fielding percentage (high)	John Olerud	.995	1989–1996	
Fielding percentage (low)	Ed Sprague	.951	1991–1998	
Stolen bases (allowed)	Gregg Zaun	300	2004–2008	
Caught stealing	Gregg Zaun	88	2004–2008	

== Individual single-season records ==
=== Single-season batting ===
Single-season batting records
Statistic	Player	Record	Season	Ref
Batting average	John Olerud	.363	1993	
Hits	Vernon Wells	215	2003	
Home runs	José Bautista	54	2010	
Grand slams	Lourdes Gurriel Jr.	4	2021	
On-base percentage	John Olerud	.473	1993	
Slugging percentage	Carlos Delgado	.664	2000	
OPS	Carlos Delgado	1.134	2000	
Runs	Shawn Green	134	1999	
RBI	Carlos Delgado	145	2003	
Walks	José Bautista	132	2011	
Intentional walks	John Olerud	33	1993	
Stolen bases	Dave Collins	60	1984	
Singles	Tony Fernández	161	1986	
Doubles	Carlos Delgado	57	2000	
Triples	Tony Fernández	17	1990	
Extra-base hits	Carlos Delgado	99	2000	
Games played	Tony Fernández	163	1986	
At bats	Tony Fernández	687	1986	
Strikeouts	Kazuma Okamoto	183	2026	
Fewest strikeouts (regular starter)	Bob Bailor	21	1978	
Hit by pitch	Shea Hillenbrand	22	2005	
Longest hitting streak	Shawn Green	28	1999	
Home runs before the All-Star break	José Bautista	31	2011	
Home runs in a single month	Edwin Encarnación	16	2014	
RBIs in a single month	Edwin Encarnación, Josh Donaldson	35	2015	
Walk-off home runs	Josh Donaldson	3	2015	
Most consecutive multi-hit games	Lourdes Gurriel Jr.	11	2018	
Most consecutive games with a home run	Kendrys Morales	7	2018	
Home runs by a middle infielder	Marcus Semien	38	2021	
Most home runs by a rookie	Kazuma Okamoto	33	2026	

=== Single-season pitching ===
Single-season pitching records
Statistic	Player	Record	Season	Ref(s)
Wins (starter)	Roy Halladay	22	2003	
Wins (reliever)	Mark Eichhorn	14	1986	
Lowest ERA^{[b]}	Roger Clemens	2.05	1997	
Strikeouts	Roger Clemens	292	1997	
Most decisions	Dave Stieb	31	1982	
Most starts	Jim Clancy	40	1982	
Complete games	Dave Stieb	19	1982	
Shutouts	Dave Stieb	5	1982	
Innings pitched	Dave Stieb	288.1	1982	
Hits allowed	Dave Lemanczyk	278	1977	
Earned runs allowed	Erik Hanson	129	1996	
Runs allowed	Erik Hanson, Dave Lemanczyk	143	1996, 1977	
Home runs allowed	Woody Williams	36	1998	
Walks	Jim Clancy	128	1980	
Hit batsmen	Chris Carpenter, Alek Manoah, Chris Bassitt	16	2001, 2021, 2024	
Wild pitches	Juan Guzmán	26	1993	
Balks	Mark Eichhorn	6	1988	
Most appearances	Mark Eichhorn	89	1987	
Saves	Duane Ward	45	1993	
Consecutive saves converted	Tom Henke	25	1991	
Games finished	Duane Ward	70	1993	
Relief innings	Mark Eichhorn	157.0	1986	
Longest win streak	Roger Clemens, Roy Halladay	15	1998, 2003	
Longest losing streak	Ricky Romero	13	2012	
Best start	Roger Clemens, Dennis Lamp	11–0	1997, 1985	
Most consecutive batters faced without surrendering a hit	Brett Cecil	43	2013	

Fielding leaders

- Errors: 37 – Alfredo Griffin (SS) (1980)

== Individual single-game records ==
=== Single-game individual batting records ===
Single-game individual batting records
Statistic	Record	Player(s)	Opponent	Date	Notes
Most at-bats	9	Alfredo Griffin / José Reyes	Boston Red Sox / Detroit Tigers	October 4, 1980 / August 10, 2014	17-inning game / 19-inning game
Most at-bats (9-inning game)	7	Ben Revere	Baltimore Orioles	September 30, 2015	—
Most runs scored	5	5 tied, most recently Lourdes Gurriel Jr.	Baltimore Orioles	September 12, 2021	—
Most hits	6	Frank Catalanotto / Lourdes Gurriel Jr.	Chicago White Sox / Boston Red Sox	May 1, 2004 / July 22, 2022	—
Most doubles	4	Dámaso García / Shannon Stewart / Alex Ríos	New York Yankees / New York Mets / Boston Red Sox	June 27, 1986 / July 18, 2000 / August 17, 2008	—
Most triples	2	11 tied, most recently Alex Ríos	Tampa Bay Devil Rays	April 27, 2005	—
Most home runs	4	Carlos Delgado	Tampa Bay Devil Rays	September 25, 2003	—
Most total bases	16	Carlos Delgado	Tampa Bay Devil Rays	September 25, 2003	—
Most RBIs	9	Roy Howell / Edwin Encarnación	New York Yankees / Detroit Tigers	September 10, 1977 / August 29, 2015	—
Most strikeouts	6	Alex Gonzalez	Cleveland Indians	September 9, 1998	—
Most walks	5	Melky Cabrera	Detroit Tigers	August 10, 2014	—
Most stolen bases	4	Dámaso García / Dave Collins / Roberto Alomar / Otis Nixon / Rajai Davis	Oakland Athletics / Baltimore Orioles / Baltimore Orioles / Boston Red Sox / Houston Astros	April 25, 1984 / August 5, 1984 / June 8, 1991 / August 14, 1996 / July 28, 2013	—
Most hit by pitch	3	Reed Johnson	Texas Rangers / Tampa Bay Devil Rays / New York Yankees	April 16, 2005 / April 7, 2006 / April 29, 2006	—
Most times on base	8	Melky Cabrera	Detroit Tigers	August 10, 2014	—

Pitching leaders

Single-game individual pitching records
Statistic	Record	Player(s)	Opponent	Date	Notes
Most innings	12	Jesse Jefferson / Dave Stieb	Boston Red Sox / Oakland Athletics	May 23, 1978 / May 17, 1980	—
Most innings (reliever)	7.1	Mike Willis	Boston Red Sox	September 27, 1977	—
Most hits allowed	14	Josh Towers	Minnesota Twins	May 27, 2005	—
Most runs allowed	13	David Wells	Milwaukee Brewers	August 20, 1992	—
Most earned runs	13	David Wells	Milwaukee Brewers	August 20, 1992	—
Most unearned runs	10	Dave Stewart	Boston Red Sox	May 19, 1993	—
Most home runs allowed	5	Pat Hentgen	Cleveland Indians / Boston Red Sox	May 26, 1995 / June 25, 1997	Twice
Most strikeouts	18	Roger Clemens	Kansas City Royals	August 25, 1998	—
Most walks	9	Jesse Jefferson / Jim Clancy / Tom Candiotti / Pat Hentgen / Chris Carpenter	Baltimore Orioles / Chicago White Sox / Detroit Tigers / Seattle Mariners / Seattle Mariners	June 18, 1977 / August 30, 1984 / August 8, 1991 / July 15, 1995 / August 16, 1999	—
Most walks in an inning	6	Shane Bieber	Washington Nationals	July 28, 2026	
Most hit batsmen	3	David Wells / Chris Michalak / Mark Buehrle	Baltimore Orioles / Tampa Bay Devil Rays / Tampa Bay Rays	April 12, 1992 / June 6, 2001 / October 2, 2015	—
Most wild pitches	4	John Cerutti	Boston Red Sox	July 3, 1986	—
Most strikeouts (Blue Jays debut)	12	Dylan Cease	Athletics	March 28, 2026	
Most strikeouts (MLB debut)	9	Trey Yesavage	Tampa Bay Rays	September 15, 2025	

== Team season records ==
These are records of Blue Jays teams with the best and worst performances in particular statistical categories during a single season.

=== Season batting ===
Season batting records
Statistic	Record	Season
Batting average	.284	2006
On-base percentage	.363	1993
Slugging percentage	.495	2015
On-base plus slugging	.838	2015
Home runs	257	2010
RBIs	891	2015
Runs	891	2015
Hits	1,580	1999, 2003
Doubles	357	2003
Triples	68	1984
Total bases	2,694	2003
Strikeouts	1,365	2023
Stolen bases	193	1984
Walks	645	1993
Extra-base hits	610	2015
Intentional walks	55	1993

=== Season pitching ===
Season pitching records
Statistic	Record	Season
Earned run average	3.29	1985
Earned run average (highest)	5.14	2000
Strikeouts	1,430	2025
Strikeouts (fewest)	611	1979
Walks	654	1995
Walks (fewest)	445	1990
Hits allowed	1,615	2000
Hits allowed (fewest)	1,301	1991
Home runs allowed	209	2025
Home runs allowed (fewest)	99	1989
Hit batsmen	77	2011
Hit batsmen (fewest)	20	1977
Wild pitches	83	1993
Wild pitches (fewest)	25	1983
Wins by a pitching duo	38 – Roy Halladay (20–11) and A. J. Burnett (18–10)	2008

== Single-game team records ==
=== Single-game team batting ===
Single-game batting records
Statistic	Record	Date	Opponent	Ref
Most runs	28	July 22, 2022	Boston Red Sox	
Most runs in an inning	11 (two times)	Sept. 11, 2021 (7th inn.); July 22, 2022 (5th inn.)	Baltimore Orioles; Boston Red Sox	
Most hits	29	July 22, 2022	Boston Red Sox	
Most singles	17 (three times)	Most recently: Aug. 24, 1997	Kansas City Royals	
Most doubles	10	Aug. 17, 2008	Boston Red Sox	
Most triples	4 (three times)	Most recently: July 5, 1984	Seattle Mariners	
Most home runs	10	Sept. 14, 1987	Baltimore Orioles	
Most total bases	53	Sept. 14, 1987	Baltimore Orioles	
Most RBIs	28	July 22, 2022	Boston Red Sox	
Most extra-base hits	12 (three times)	Most recently: Aug. 17, 2008	Boston Red Sox	
Most strikeouts (batting)	22	Aug. 1, 2016 (14 innings)	Houston Astros	
Most walks	14	Aug. 10, 2014 (19 innings)	Detroit Tigers	
Most stolen bases	7	Aug. 5, 1984	Baltimore Orioles	
Most sacrifice hits	4 (two times)	Most recently: Aug. 14, 1990	Chicago White Sox	
Most sacrifice flies	4 (three times)	Most recently: June 11, 2016	Baltimore Orioles	
Most hit by pitch	4 (two times)	Most recently: July 19, 2003	Baltimore Orioles	
Most grounded into double plays	6 (two times)	Aug. 29, 1977; Aug. 30, 2009	Minnesota Twins; Kansas City Royals	
Best shutout victory	15–0 (two times)	July 6, 1996; Aug. 31, 2024	Detroit Tigers; Minnesota Twins	
Best shutout victory (home)	14–0	May 22, 2025	San Diego Padres	
Worst shutout defeat	0–16	July 25, 2012	Oakland Athletics	
Best winning margin	23	July 22, 2022	Boston Red Sox	
Worst losing margin	22 (two times)	Most recently: Sept. 28, 2000	Baltimore Orioles	
Most consecutive games, ≥1 HR	23 games (44 HR)	May 31 – June 25, 2000	—	
Most consecutive games, ≥1 HR at home	22	May 31 – July 23, 2000	—	
Most consecutive games, no home runs	10 (three times)	Most recently: Sept. 20 – Oct. 1, 1995	—	
Most consecutive strikeouts, batters	7	May 25, 2001	Boston Red Sox	
Most consecutive strikeouts to start a game	6	July 26, 2000	Cleveland Indians	

=== Pitching leaders ===
Single-game team pitching records
Category	Record	Date	Opponent	Notes / Ref
Most runs allowed	24	August 25, 1979	California Angels	
Most earned runs	22	August 28, 1992	Milwaukee Brewers	
Most unearned runs	13	September 28, 2000	Baltimore Orioles	
Most hits allowed	31	August 28, 1992	Milwaukee Brewers	Same game as most earned runs
Most home runs allowed	8	July 4, 1977; June 20, 2000	Boston Red Sox; Detroit Tigers	Tied record
Most hit batsmen	5	May 15, 2017	Atlanta Braves	
Most strikeouts (9-inning game)	19	April 16, 2025	Atlanta Braves	
Longest 1–0 game (won)	12 innings	September 26, 1986; June 24, 2015	Boston Red Sox; Tampa Bay Rays	Two occurrences
Longest 1–0 game (lost)	15 innings	July 27, 1986	Oakland Athletics	

== Organization records ==
Organization records
Statistic	Record	Year(s)	Notes
Wins	99	1985	—
Losses	109	1979	—
Winning percentage (high)	.615	1985	—
Winning percentage (low)	.327	1979	—
Most games back	50.5	1979	—
Division titles	7	1985, 1989, 1991–93, 2015, 2025	—
American League pennants	3	1992–93, 2025	—
World championships	2	1992–93	—
Attendance (season high)	4,057,947	1993	—
Attendance (season low)	755,083	1981	—
Attendance (single game high)	52,268	October 22, 1992	—
Attendance (single game low)	10,074	April 17, 1979	—
Shortest nine-inning game (time)	1:44	May 10, 2005	vs. Kansas City Royals (W 3–1)
Longest game (innings)	19	August 10, 2014; July 1, 2016; September 5, 2017	vs. Detroit Tigers (W 6–5) vs. Cleveland Indians (L 2–1) at Boston Red Sox (L 3–2)
Longest game (innings, since 2020 rule change)	14	May 31, 2024	vs. Pittsburgh Pirates (W 5–3)
Longest nine-inning game (time)	4:23	September 6, 2020	vs. Boston Red Sox (W 10–8)
Longest game (time)	6:39	October 27–28, 2025	World Series Game 3 vs. Los Angeles Dodgers (L 6–5, 18 innings)
Longest winning streak	11 games	1987, 1998, 2013, 2015	Achieved five times: June 2–13, 1987; August 27–September 7, 1998; June 11–24, 2013; June 2–14, 2015; August 2–13, 2015
Longest home winning streak	11 games	2025	June 30–July 6; July 18–21

== Rare feats ==
Franchise achievements and notable records
Achievement	Player(s)	Opponent / Context	Date / Notes
Back-to-Back World Series Wins	—	Atlanta Braves / Philadelphia Phillies	1992–1993
Walk-Off Home Run to win World Series	Joe Carter	Philadelphia Phillies	October 23, 1993 (Game 6, Bottom 9th, 3–2 series lead)
Longest Opening Day game	—	Cleveland Indians	April 5, 2012 (16 innings)
11 runs scored in an inning	—	Seattle Mariners; Oakland Athletics; Minnesota Twins; Baltimore Orioles; Boston Red Sox	July 20, 1984; April 26, 1995; July 25, 2007; September 11, 2021; July 22, 2022
Ten team home runs in one game	Ernie Whitt, Rance Mulliniks, George Bell, Fred McGriff, Lloyd Moseby, Rob Ducey	Baltimore Orioles	September 14, 1987
Four home runs scored in one inning	—	Baltimore Orioles	September 12, 2021
Four home runs in one game	Carlos Delgado	Tampa Bay Devil Rays	September 25, 2003
50-home run season	José Bautista	—	2010 (54 HR)
Cycles	Kelly Gruber; Jeff Frye; Cavan Biggio	Kansas City Royals; Texas Rangers; Baltimore Orioles	April 16, 1989; August 17, 2001; September 17, 2019
Six hits in one game	Frank Catalanotto; Lourdes Gurriel Jr.	Chicago White Sox; Boston Red Sox	May 1, 2004; July 22, 2022
Four grand slams in a season	Lourdes Gurriel Jr.	Various	2021 (4 total)
Two home runs in one inning	Joe Carter, Edwin Encarnación	—	1993, 2013
Back-to-back-to-back home runs	—	Oakland Athletics; Detroit Tigers; Anaheim Angels; Minnesota Twins; Boston Red Sox; Milwaukee Brewers; Baltimore Orioles	April 26, 1984; September 12, 1987; April 18, 2000; August 21, 2001; April 9, 2005; June 19, 2012; September 13, 2026
Back-to-back-to-back triples	Eric Thames, Rajai Davis, Jayson Nix	Cleveland Indians	June 1, 2011
Two Canadians HR in same inning (first in MLB)	Russell Martin, Michael Saunders	New York Yankees	May 25, 2016
Two walk-off grand slams in one season	Steve Pearce	Oakland Athletics / Los Angeles Angels	July 27 & 30, 2017
Ultimate grand slam	Steve Pearce	Los Angeles Angels	July 30, 2017
Home Run in First MLB Game	Charles McAdoo; Davis Schneider; Devon Travis; J. P. Arencibia; Steve Staggs; Al Woods	Baltimore Orioles; Boston Red Sox; New York Yankees; Tampa Bay Rays; Cleveland Indians; Chicago White Sox	May 29, 2026; August 4, 2023; April 6, 2015; August 7, 2010; July 1, 1977; April 7, 1977
Triple Crown (pitching)	Roger Clemens	—	1997 (21 W, 2.05 ERA, 292 K); 1998 (20 W, 2.65 ERA, 271 K)
No-Hitter	Dave Stieb	Cleveland Indians	September 2, 1990
Immaculate inning	Roger Clemens; Steve Delabar; Thomas Pannone	—	September 18, 1997; July 30, 2013; April 13, 2019
Most strikeouts in 1000 innings pitched	Robbie Ray	Baltimore Orioles	August 30, 2021 (1241 K)
Reliever strikes out side in extra innings (bases loaded)	Jesse Carlson	Texas Rangers	April 16, 2008 (11th inning; game lost in 14th)
Four strikeouts in one extra inning	Steve Delabar; Mike Bolsinger	Chicago White Sox; Boston Red Sox	August 13, 2012 (3–2 win); July 18, 2017 (5–4 loss)
Triple play	—	Kansas City Royals	Latest: April 20, 2012 (4 total)
Won MLB Debut	Chad Dallas; Spencer Miles; Alek Manoah; Chris Rowley; Drew Hutchison; Ricky Romero; Jesse Litsch; Gustavo Chacín; Justin Miller; Brandon Lyon; Kelvim Escobar; Giovanni Carrara; Mauro Gozzo; Matt Williams; Luis Leal; Butch Edge; Phil Huffman; Jerry Garvin	Atlanta Braves; Athletics; New York Yankees; Pittsburgh Pirates; Kansas City Royals; Detroit Tigers; Baltimore Orioles; New York Yankees; Tampa Bay Devil Rays; Baltimore Orioles; Baltimore Orioles; Oakland Athletics; Texas Rangers; New York Yankees; New York Yankees; Oakland Athletics; Chicago White Sox; Chicago White Sox	June 4, 2026; March 28, 2026; May 27, 2021; August 12, 2017; April 21, 2012; April 9, 2009; May 15, 2007; September 20, 2004; April 12, 2002; August 4, 2001; June 29, 1997; July 29, 1995; August 8, 1989; August 2, 1983; May 25, 1980; August 13, 1979; April 10, 1979; April 10, 1977

== Club firsts ==
Franchise firsts and notable achievements
Achievement	Player(s)	Opponent / Context	Date / Notes
First game & win	—	Chicago White Sox	April 7, 1977 — Toronto 9, Chicago 5 at Exhibition Stadium
First batter	John Scott	—	April 7, 1977
First pitcher	Bill Singer	—	April 7, 1977
First home run	Doug Ault	Chicago White Sox	April 7, 1977
First grand slam	Héctor Torres	New York Yankees	June 27, 1977
First win (pitcher)	Jerry Johnson	—	April 7, 1977
First save	Pete Vuckovich	Chicago White Sox	April 7, 1977
First walk-off win	—	Detroit Tigers	July 15, 1977 — 8–6 (13 innings)
Walk-off grand slam (regulation)	George Bell	—	September 4, 1988
Walk-off grand slam (extra innings)	Gregg Zaun	Tampa Bay Devil Rays	September 6, 2008 — 7–4 (13 innings)
Ultimate grand slam	Steve Pearce	Los Angeles Angels	July 30, 2017
Cy Young Award	Pat Hentgen	—	1996
Two-season 20-game winner	Roger Clemens	—	1997–1998
AL strikeout leader	Roger Clemens	—	1997 (292)
Gold Glove winners	Tony Fernández; Jesse Barfield; Kelly Gruber; Roberto Alomar; R. A. Dickey; Vladimir Guerrero Jr.	—	1986; 1986; 1990; 1991; 2013; 2022
Silver Slugger winner	Dámaso García	—	1982
AL MVP	George Bell	—	1987
Hank Aaron Award	Carlos Delgado	—	2000
Rookie of the Year	Alfredo Griffin	—	1979
Manager of the Year	Bobby Cox	—	1985
First 20-game winner (pitcher)	Jack Morris	—	1992
First player with back-to-back 40-HR seasons	Carlos Delgado	—	1999–2000
First to lead MLB in All-Star voting	José Bautista	—	2011 (7,454,753 votes)
No-hitter	Dave Stieb	Cleveland Indians	September 2, 1990

== Note ==
- ¹Henke is team's save leader; but has only 563 IP
- ²minimum 162 innings pitched must be pitched (1 inning pitched per game played).
- Slugger Awards were first given out in 1980
