= Roy Lee Jackson =

American baseball player (born 1954)

- Pitcher
- Born: May 1, 1954 (age 71); Opelika, Alabama, U.S.
- Batted: Right Threw: Right

MLB debut
- September 13, 1977, for the New York Mets

Last MLB appearance
- October 1, 1986, for the Minnesota Twins

MLB statistics
- Win–loss record: 28–34
- Earned run average: 3.77
- Strikeouts: 351
- Stats at Baseball Reference

Teams
- New York Mets (1977–1980); Toronto Blue Jays (1981–1984); San Diego Padres (1985); Minnesota Twins (1986)

Roy Lee Jackson (born May 1, 1954) is an American former professional baseball pitcher. He played for the New York Mets, Toronto Blue Jays, San Diego Padres, and Minnesota Twins across 10 seasons.

== Early years ==
Jackson was born in Opelika, Alabama. He was drafted by the Houston Astros upon graduation from Opelika High School in the 12th round of the 1972 Major League Baseball draft, but did not sign. Instead, he attended Tuskegee University. After three years with the Tuskegee Golden Tigers college baseball team, he signed as an amateur free agent with the New York Mets.

== New York Mets ==
Jackson went 28-21 with a 3.09 earned run average over three seasons in the Mets' farm system when he received his first September call-up in 1977. He received a no decision in his major league debut against the Montreal Expos, pitching 5.2 innings and allowing three earned runs. All told, he made four starts over the remainder of the season, losing twice to the St. Louis Cardinals.

September call-ups seemed to be a theme in Jackson's Mets career. He spent the following two seasons in the minors, getting a call up in September each time. In 1979, he was used more in relief, and earned his first win against the Cardinals.

He spent roughly half the 1980 season in the majors. On July 19, he pitched his only career complete game victory against the Cincinnati Reds, and notched his only career extra base hit off Charlie Leibrandt. He would lose his next four starts, however, and be moved into the bullpen. On September 13, he earned his first career save against the Chicago Cubs, pitching three innings of one hit ball. During the off season, he was traded to the Toronto Blue Jays for infielder Bob Bailor.

== Toronto Blue Jays ==
In his first full season in the majors, Jackson was used exclusively in relief. On April 13, he entered in the eighth with the bases loaded and one out against the New York Yankees. He got a double play, then pitched a scoreless ninth for his first save on the season. He was 1-2 with a 3.05 ERA and two saves when a strike interrupted the 1981 season. When play resumed, he proved to be the most reliable arm in manager Bobby Mattick's bullpen. He allowed just three runs in 17.2 innings pitched and earned five saves. He led Jays relievers with 62 innings pitched and a 2.61 ERA. His seven saves were second to Joey McLaughlin.

Jackson proved equally dominant in 1982. He pitched the ninth and tenth innings for the win when the second game of the season went into extra innings. On May 30, he and Jim Gott combined on a one hit shutout of the Baltimore Orioles, which coincidentally, also happen to be the first game of Cal Ripken's 2,632 consecutive games played streak. On September 28, Jackson pitched five innings of no hit ball against the Minnesota Twins for his eighth and final victory of the season. All told, he went 8-7 with six saves as a reliever. His 2.55 ERA in 88.1 innings out of the bullpen was far and away the best among Blue Jay relievers. His 97 total innings pitched and 71 strikeouts were career highs.

In 1983, Jackson went a career best 8-3. In 1984, he had a career best ten saves. Both seasons, he led Jays relievers in innings pitched (92 and 86, respectively). Despite these numbers, he was released in Spring training 1985.

== San Diego Padres ==
Shortly after his release from the Jays, Jackson signed a minor league deal with the Baltimore Orioles. He was 1-1 with an even 3.00 ERA for the International League's Rochester Red Wings when he was traded to the San Diego Padres for second baseman Alan Wiggins. After three appearances with the Las Vegas Stars, Jackson was back in the majors.

He went 2-3 with a 2.70 ERA, and won his first start in two years, pitching five innings of two hit ball against his former club, the Mets.

== Minnesota Twins ==
The Padres released Jackson the following spring, and he signed with the Twins. He had one win and one save in his one season in Minnesota. He re-signed with the Brewers in 1987, and made four appearances with the Denver Zephyrs before retiring.

== Career stats ==
W	L	Pct	ERA	G	GS	GF	SHO	IP	H	ER	R	HR	BB	K	WP	HBP	BAA	Fld%	Avg.
28	38	.424	3.77	280	18	111	0	559	531	234	260	50	203	351	20	17	.254	.964	.194

Jackson is also an exceptional singer, and has performed "The Star-Spangled Banner" and "O Canada" before ballgames. His 1984 Fleer Baseball Card (#158) captures him performing one of the anthems before a game. He is now the pastor of the New Creation Service Center in Opelika.
