= Dave Collins (baseball) =

American baseball player (born 1952)

- Outfielder
- Born: October 20, 1952 (age 74); Rapid City, South Dakota, U.S.
- Batted: Switch Threw: Left

MLB debut
- June 7, 1975, for the California Angels

Last MLB appearance
- October 3, 1990, for the St. Louis Cardinals

MLB statistics
- Batting average: .272
- Home runs: 32
- Runs batted in: 373
- Stolen bases: 395
- Stats at Baseball Reference

Teams
- As player: California Angels (1975–1976); Seattle Mariners (1977); Cincinnati Reds (1978–1981); New York Yankees (1982); Toronto Blue Jays (1983–1984); Oakland Athletics (1985); Detroit Tigers (1986); Cincinnati Reds (1987–1989); St. Louis Cardinals (1990); As coach: St. Louis Cardinals (1991–1992); Cincinnati Reds (1999–2000); Milwaukee Brewers (2002); Colorado Rockies (2003–2006); Florida Marlins (2010)

David S. Collins (born October 20, 1952) is an American former outfielder in Major League Baseball from 1975 to 1990.

Collins is one of three players to have made it to the major leagues who played for the Rapid City Post 22 American Legion baseball program in Rapid City, South Dakota. The other two are Kelvin Torve and Mark Ellis. All three were graduates of Stevens High School in Rapid City. Collins currently holds the Toronto Blue Jays single season stolen base record with 60 steals in 1984.

== Playing career ==
=== Minor leagues ===
Collins was drafted by the California Angels in the first round of the 1972 Major League Baseball draft out of Mesa Community College. Collins made his professional debut with the Angels Rookie ball team in Idaho Falls and moved up through the Angels farm system, with stops in Single-A Quad City and Salinas, Double-A El Paso and Triple-A Salt Lake City. Collins was dubbed the "fastest white man in baseball" because he ran the 100-yard dash in 9.6 seconds and had high stolen base totals.

=== California Angels ===
Collins made his major league debut for the Angels on June 7, 1975, playing left field and batting leadoff, against the Milwaukee Brewers. Collins recorded his first career hit the following day against Brewers pitcher Tom Murphy.

=== Seattle Mariners ===
After two seasons as a utility player and reserve outfielder with the Angels, Collins was selected by the Seattle Mariners with the 14th pick in the 1976 Major League Baseball expansion draft. Collins was the first batter for the Mariners in their first game, and he scored the franchise's first run two days later. He hit .239 for the season, leading the Mariners with 25 stolen bases and 10 times caught stealing.

=== Cincinnati Reds ===
After that 1977 season, the Mariners traded Collins to the Cincinnati Reds for pitcher Shane Rawley. Collins spent the next four seasons with the Reds. Collins hit .318 in 1979 and .303 in 1980 (8th in National League) and also scored 94 runs (7th in National League) and stole 79 bases (3rd in National League).

=== New York Yankees ===
Collins was signed by the New York Yankees as a free agent prior to the 1982 season.

=== Toronto Blue Jays ===
Collins was traded by the Yankees, along with Mike Morgan, Fred McGriff and cash to the Toronto Blue Jays in 1983 for Tom Dodd and Dale Murray. Collins hit .271 and .308 in his two seasons in Toronto, and currently holds the Blue Jays single season stolen base record with 60 steals in 1984. Collins also led the American League with 15 triples hit in 1984.

=== Oakland A's ===
Collins was traded in December 1984 by the Blue Jays, along with Alfredo Griffin and cash, to the Oakland Athletics, in exchange for Bill Caudill. Collins hit .251 in 112 games for Oakland during the 1985 season.

=== Detroit Tigers ===
Collins was then traded to the Detroit Tigers for Bárbaro Garbey in November 1985. As a part-time outfielder with Detroit, Collins hit .270 and stole 27 bases.

=== Montreal Expos ===
Picked up by the Montreal Expos as a free agent after the season, Collins was cut during spring training.

=== Cincinnati Reds ===
Collins was signed by the Cincinnati Reds, with whom he had previously had the most success. Used as a fourth outfielder/pinch hitter by the Reds, Collins found some success, hitting .294 in 1987, but his average dropped to .236 in 1988. In 1989, he was released.

=== St. Louis Cardinals ===
Collins' last season was in 1990, with the St. Louis Cardinals, batting .224 in 99 games as a first baseman.

=== Career statistics ===
In 1701 games over 16 seasons, Collins compiled a .272 batting average with 667 runs, 187 doubles, 52 triples, 32 home runs, 373 RBI, 395 stolen bases, 467 base on balls, 660 strikeouts, and a .338 on-base percentage and .351 slugging percentage. Defensively, Collins recorded a .986 fielding percentage at all three outfield positions and at first base. Tommy John thought Collins was a better player on Astroturf fields (like Riverfront Stadium) than natural grass fields (like Yankee Stadium).

=== Retirement ===
Collins played briefly for the Fort Myers Sun Sox of the Senior Professional Baseball Association.

He was inducted into the South Dakota Sports Hall of Fame in 1995.

Collins has volunteered at the Lighthouse Correctional Facility, conducting one-hour motivational and life skills sessions to young offenders, with the hope of enhancing and changing their lives.

== Coaching career ==
After playing, Collins was a coach and manager for several teams. He was the Cardinals' first base coach in 1991 and 1992. He was the Reds' first base coach in 1999 and 2000. He had the same job with the Milwaukee Brewers in 2002, then the Colorado Rockies from 2003 to 2006. Collins was the first base coach for the Miami Marlins for part of the 2010 season, resigning after manager Fredi Gonzalez was fired. In Minor League Baseball (MiLB), Collins managed the Salem Avalanche in 2001 and the Inland Empire 66ers in 2007.

At the amateur level, Collins was the head coach for Anna High School in Anna, Ohio, from 1992 to 1994. Collins was the head baseball and basketball coach for Lake Orion High School in Lake Orion, Michigan, from 1996 to 1998. In 2009, he was assistant coach for the Ontario Blue Jays 18U team. In 2018, Collins was an assistant coach at Miami University Hamilton, with a focus on outfield and base running. In 2020, he became the bench coach at Indiana University Southeast and coached his grandson Connor Kelly.

== See also ==
- List of Major League Baseball career stolen bases leaders
- List of St. Louis Cardinals coaches

Sporting positions
Preceded by Jim Riggleman	St. Louis Cardinals first base coach 1991–1992	Succeeded by Jack Hubbard
Preceded by Ron Oester	Cincinnati Reds first base coach 1999–2000	Succeeded by Bill Doran
Preceded by Alan Cockrell	Salem Avalanche Manager; 2001	Succeeded by Stu Cole
Preceded by Luis Salazar	Milwaukee Brewers first base coach 2002	Succeeded by Dave Nelson
Preceded by Dallas Williams	Colorado Rockies first base coach 2003–2006	Succeeded by Glenallen Hill
Preceded by Gary Thurman	Inland Empire 66ers Manager; 2007	Succeeded by John Valentin
Preceded by Andy Fox	Florida Marlins first base coach 2010	Succeeded by Perry Hill
