= Tony Johnson (baseball) =

American baseball player

- Left fielder
- Born: February 23, 1956 (age 69); Memphis, Tennessee, U.S.
- Batted: Right Threw: Right

MLB debut
- September 27, 1981, for the Montreal Expos

Last MLB appearance
- October 3, 1982, for the Toronto Blue Jays

MLB statistics
- Batting average: .232
- Home runs: 3
- Runs batted in: 14
- Stats at Baseball Reference

Teams
- Montreal Expos (1981); Toronto Blue Jays (1982)

Anthony Clair Johnson (born February 23, 1956) is an American former professional baseball left fielder and designated hitter who played for two seasons, initially with the Montreal Expos during the 1981 Montreal Expos season, then the Toronto Blue Jays during the 1982 Toronto Blue Jays season.
