= Craig McMurtry =

American baseball player (born 1959)

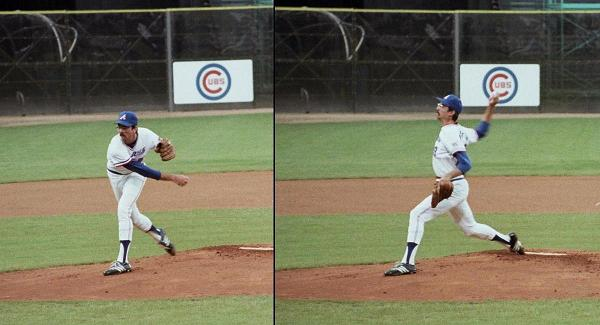
- Pitcher
- Born: November 5, 1959 (age 66); Temple, Texas, U.S.
- Batted: Right Threw: Right

MLB debut
- April 10, 1983, for the Atlanta Braves

Last MLB appearance
- September 28, 1995, for the Houston Astros

MLB statistics
- Win–loss record: 28–42
- Earned run average: 4.08
- Strikeouts: 349
- Stats at Baseball Reference

Teams
- Atlanta Braves (1983–1986); Texas Rangers (1988–1990); Houston Astros (1995)

Joe Craig McMurtry (born November 5, 1959) is an American former professional baseball pitcher who played eight non-consecutive seasons in Major League Baseball (MLB). He played for the Atlanta Braves (1983–86), Texas Rangers (1988–90) and Houston Astros (1995).

He was named the athletic director at Temple College in 2013 and has been the school's head baseball coach since 1998.

== Career ==
In 1982, McMurtry was Pitcher of the Year for the International League's Richmond Braves. In 1983, he finished seventh in voting for the National League Cy Young Award and second in voting for National League Rookie of the Year, to Darryl Strawberry, for having a 15–9 record with a 3.08 ERA in 36 games, 35 of them started. He also completed six games and shutout three.

In eight seasons, he had a 28–42 win–loss record, 212 games, 79 games started, six complete games, three shutouts, 36 games finished, four saves, 667 2/3 innings pitched, 650 hits allowed, 341 runs allowed, 303 earned runs allowed, 54 home runs allowed, 336 walks allowed, 349 strikeouts, 10 hit batsmen, 18 wild pitches, 2,921 batters faced, 17 intentional walks, eight balks and a 4.08 ERA.

On June 4, 1986, McMurtry gave up Barry Bonds's first career home run. Looking back on the play twenty years later he said "It was a fastball, down and away. He took it the other way. I don't know how he hit it."

On February 2, 1987, McMurtry was traded by the Braves to the Toronto Blue Jays for Damaso Garcia and Luis Leal. However, McMurtry never played a game for the Blue Jays. Also, Leal never played for the Braves, while Garcia played only 21 games for them, batting .117 before being released.

After retiring as a player, McMurtry was a pitching coach in the Houston Astros organization with their Rookie Team in 1996 and the New Orleans Zephyrs in 1997. In 1998, McMurtry was hired to coach the baseball team at Temple College. McMurtry lead the Leopards to two JUCO world series in 2006 and 2010, where they finished 8th and 5th in the nation. In 2024, McMurtry notched his 800th career win as head coach of Temple College.
