= Glenn Adams =

American baseball player (born 1947)

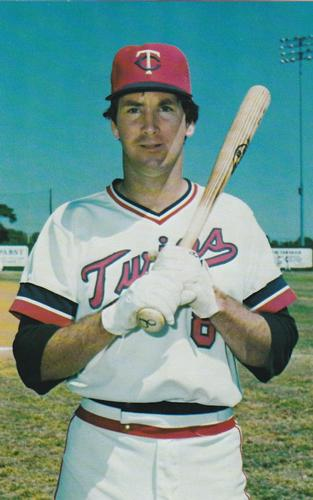
- Designated hitter / Corner outfielder
- Born: October 4, 1947 (age 79); Northbridge, Massachusetts, U.S.
- Batted: Left Threw: Right

MLB debut
- May 4, 1975, for the San Francisco Giants

Last MLB appearance
- October 3, 1982, for the Toronto Blue Jays

MLB statistics
- Batting average: .280
- Home runs: 34
- Runs batted in: 225
- Stats at Baseball Reference

Teams
- San Francisco Giants (1975–1976); Minnesota Twins (1977–1981); Toronto Blue Jays (1982)

Glenn Charles Adams (born October 4, 1947) is an American former designated hitter and corner outfielder in Major League Baseball. He played for the San Francisco Giants, Minnesota Twins, and Toronto Blue Jays in a career spanning eight seasons.

== Amateur career ==
Adams attended and played college baseball at Springfield College in Springfield, Massachusetts. In 1967, he played collegiate summer baseball with the Harwich Mariners of the Cape Cod Baseball League and was named a league all-star. Adams was the first-round pick in the 1968 amateur draft of the Houston Astros (fourth pick overall).

== Professional career ==
After four seasons in the Astros minor league system, Adams reached AAA but was released in January 1972. He missed the 1972 season but signed with the San Francisco Giants after the 1972 season ended. He remained in the minor leagues for two more seasons, and ended up breaking into the major leagues with the Giants in 1975.

Adams played on the bay through the end of the 1976 season, after which he signed with the Minnesota Twins. He spent five seasons with Minnesota, hitting .338 in 1977 and .301 in 1979. After the 1981 season, he signed with the Toronto Blue Jays organization. He opened the season with the AAA Syracuse Chiefs, before getting called up to the Blue Jays on July 30. He played the rest of the season for Toronto, retiring at the conclusion of the year. During his career, Adams appeared in 373 games as a designated hitter and 145 games as an outfielder.
