= Luis Leal (baseball) =

Venezuelan baseball player (born 1957)

- Pitcher
- Born: March 21, 1957 (age 69); Barquisimeto, Lara State, Venezuela
- Batted: Right Threw: Right

MLB debut
- May 25, 1980, for the Toronto Blue Jays

Last MLB appearance
- June 29, 1985, for the Toronto Blue Jays

MLB statistics
- Win–loss record: 51–58
- Earned run average: 4.14
- Strikeouts: 491
- Stats at Baseball Reference

Teams
- Toronto Blue Jays (1980–1985)

Member of the Venezuelan

Baseball Hall of Fame
- Induction: 2008

Luis Enrique Leal Alvarado (born March 21, 1957) is a Venezuelan former starting pitcher in Major League Baseball who played from 1980 through 1985 for the Toronto Blue Jays.

== Playing career ==
Leal signed with the Blue Jays as an amateur free agent before the start of the 1979 season. His most productive season came in 1984, when he posted a record of 13–8, with a 3.89 ERA and 134 strikeouts. In a six-year major league career, Leal had a record of 51–58 with a 4.14 ERA, 491 strikeouts, and three shutouts in 946 innings pitched.

After spending most of the 1985 and 1986 seasons with the Triple A Syracuse Chiefs, Leal was traded to the Atlanta Braves with Damaso Garcia for Craig McMurtry in February 1987. He never played for Atlanta, as he did not make the spring training roster nor any of Atlanta's minor league teams.

At the time of his retirement, Leal ranked behind only Jim Clancy and Dave Stieb among the Blue Jays' career leaders in starts, innings, wins, losses, strikeouts, and walks. He also was the opposing starting pitcher for the Blue Jays on May 15, 1981, when Len Barker of the Cleveland Indians pitched a perfect game against them.

Though mostly a starting pitcher throughout his career, Leal did achieve one save. On May 19, 1981, Leal pitched 3 1/3 innings, allowing only one run to close out a 9-5 Blue Jays victory.

Leal was inducted into the Venezuelan Baseball Hall of Fame and Museum in 2008.

== See also ==
- List of players from Venezuela in Major League Baseball
