= Wayne Nordhagen =

American baseball player (born 1948)

- Outfielder
- Born: July 4, 1948 (age 76); Thief River Falls, Minnesota, U.S.
- Batted: Right Threw: Right

MLB debut
- July 16, 1976, for the Chicago White Sox

Last MLB appearance
- May 30, 1983, for the Chicago Cubs

MLB statistics
- Batting average: .282
- Home runs: 39
- Runs batted in: 205
- Stats at Baseball Reference

Teams
- Chicago White Sox (1976–1981); Toronto Blue Jays (1982); Pittsburgh Pirates (1982); Chicago Cubs (1983)

Wayne Oren Nordhagen (born July 4, 1948) is an American former Major League Baseball outfielder and designated hitter. He played eight seasons in the majors for the Chicago White Sox (1976–81), Toronto Blue Jays (1982), Pittsburgh Pirates (1982) and Chicago Cubs (1983).

== Career ==
Drafted by the New York Yankees in 1968, Nordhagen played in 502 games in eight major league seasons. In an oddity, Nordhagen was traded twice in ten days for the same player, outfielder Dick Davis. On June 15, 1982, Nordhagen was traded by the Blue Jays to the Philadelphia Phillies for Davis. Later that day, without having played for the Phillies, he was traded again, this time to the Pirates for outfielder Bill Robinson. On June 25, after playing in just one game for the Pirates (going 2-for-4 with 2 RBI), Nordhagen was traded back to the Blue Jays as the player to be named later in a trade that occurred on June 22, in which the Pirates had acquired the very same Dick Davis.

== Personal life ==
Nordhagen is the uncle of former major league player Kevin Millar.

Nordhagen lives in Southern California with his wife of 51 years, Carrie. The couple have three daughters.
