= Dave Baker (baseball) =

American baseball player (born 1956)

- Third baseman
- Born: November 25, 1956 (age 68); Lacona, Iowa
- Batted: Left Threw: Right

MLB debut
- September 12, 1982, for the Toronto Blue Jays

Last MLB appearance
- September 29, 1982, for the Toronto Blue Jays

MLB statistics
- Batting average: .250
- Home runs: 0
- Runs batted in: 2
- Stats at Baseball Reference

Teams
- Toronto Blue Jays (1982)

David Glenn Baker (born November 25, 1956) is an American former professional baseball third baseman. Baker appeared in nine games with the Toronto Blue Jays of Major League Baseball (MLB) in 1982. He is an alumnus of UCLA.

Baker is the older brother of Doug Baker who also played in the major leagues.
