= Dale Murray =

American baseball player (born 1950)

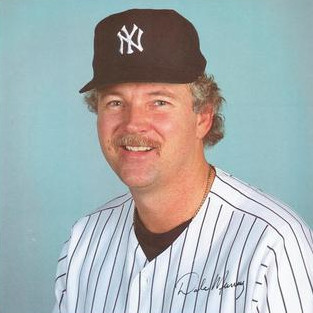
- Murray in 1984
- Pitcher
- Born: February 2, 1950 (age 75); Cuero, Texas, U.S.
- Batted: Right Threw: Right

MLB debut
- July 7, 1974, for the Montreal Expos

Last MLB appearance
- May 13, 1985, for the Texas Rangers

MLB statistics
- Win–loss record: 53–50
- Earned run average: 3.85
- Strikeouts: 400
- Saves: 60
- Stats at Baseball Reference

Teams
- Montreal Expos (1974–1976); Cincinnati Reds (1977–1978); New York Mets (1978–1979); Montreal Expos (1979–1980); Toronto Blue Jays (1981–1982); New York Yankees (1983–1985); Texas Rangers (1985)

Dale Albert Murray (born February 2, 1950) is an American former professional baseball pitcher. He played in Major League Baseball (MLB) for the Montreal Expos, Cincinnati Reds, New York Mets, Toronto Blue Jays, New York Yankees, and Texas Rangers.

== Career ==
=== Montreal Expos ===
He was drafted by the Montreal Expos out of Blinn College in Brenham, Texas, in the eighteenth round of the 1970 Major League Baseball draft, and developed into one of the top relief pitchers in the National League in the mid 70s.

Murray was used primarily in relief in Montreal's farm system. After going 11–5 with a 2.42 earned run average and eight saves in 1972 for the Eastern League's Quebec Carnavals, the Expos experimented with Murray as a starter. His record fell to 8–13 with a 4.26 ERA in 1973 for triple A Peninsula, and the idea was abandoned.

He made his major league debut in 1974 against the Los Angeles Dodgers, pitching three innings, and giving up one earned run. Though he started the season with the Memphis Blues of the International League, he emerged as the top pitcher in Montreal's bullpen by the end of the season, earning ten saves in the month of September while giving up just one earned run in 33 innings pitched. For the season, he was 1–1 with a 1.03 ERA.

The Montreal Expos won just 75 games to finish fifth in the National League East in 1975. Murray led the team with fifteen wins, and had ten saves, giving him a hand in one-third of the team's victories. He made a National League leading 81 relief appearances for the Expos in 1976. Following the season, Murray and Woodie Fryman were dealt to the World Series Champion Cincinnati Reds in exchange for Tony Pérez and Will McEnaney.

=== Cincinnati Reds ===
1977 was a typical season for Cincinnati's offense. George Foster had an MVP season, leading the major leagues with 52 home runs and 149 runs batted in. Perennial All-Star Johnny Bench also drove in over 100 runs, while Joe Morgan scored over 100 runs. Pete Rose batted over .300, as did Pérez's replacement at first base, Dan Driessen.

Unfortunately, the wheels fell off the "Big Red Machine's" pitching staff. The Reds ended the season with a 4.21 team ERA – third highest in the NL. The Los Angeles Dodgers, meanwhile, had a league leading 3.22 staff ERA to take the division by ten games over the Reds. Murray finished with a 7–2 record and 4.94 ERA his first season in Cincinnati. With the starting rotation depleted, he made his one and only career start on July 28 against the Chicago Cubs. He pitched a little over an inning, giving up six earned runs. A month into the 1978 season, he was dealt to the New York Mets for Ken Henderson.

=== New York Mets ===
Murray was tagged for five earned runs against the Philadelphia Phillies to take the loss in his first game as a Met. From there, Murray turned things around, going 8–4 with a 3.20 ERA the rest of the way for the last place club. In August 1979, Murray's contract was sold to the Montreal Expos. Despite not finishing the season in New York, he led the Mets' bullpen with 58 appearances.

=== Return to Montreal ===
The Expos were in a tight division race with the Pittsburgh Pirates when they purchased Murray's contract from the Mets just before the 1979 post-season roster deadline. Murray pitched well upon his return to Montreal, going 1–2 with a 2.70 ERA, however, the lone home run he gave up was an extra innings shot by Willie Stargell, which gave the Pirates a two-game lead in the division that they maintained for the rest of the season.

Murray split the 1980 season between the Expos and their triple A farm team, the Denver Bears. On August 28, roughly a year after purchasing his contract, the Expos released Murray with a 0–1 record and 6.14 ERA at the major league level.

=== Toronto Blue Jays ===
In January 1981, Murray signed a minor league contract with an invitation to Spring training with the Toronto Blue Jays. He began the season in triple A, but after tearing up the International League with a 1.85 ERA and sixteen saves for the Syracuse Chiefs, he earned a September call-up to the big league club. He was just as effective with the Jays, going 1–0 with a 1.17 ERA.

Murray went 8–7 with a 3.16 ERA and a team leading eleven saves for the Blue Jays in 1982. His eleven saves were also his highest season total since 1976. Following the season, he was dealt to the New York Yankees with Tom Dodd for Dave Collins, Fred McGriff and Mike Morgan. Third baseman Graig Nettles was also supposed to be included in the deal, but when the Jays refused to give him a hefty bonus, the Yankees included cash in the deal to compensate.

=== New York Yankees ===
Murray went 3–6 with a 4.58 ERA in his first two seasons as a Yankee. After giving up three earned runs with just two innings pitched in April 1985, the Yanks released him. He signed with the Texas Rangers shortly afterwards, but made just one appearance with the club. After finishing out the season with their AAA affiliate, the Oklahoma City 89ers, Murray retired.

== Career stats ==
Murray made only 79 plate appearances in his career, and had a career .077 batting average. His only career RBI came as a member of the Expos on September 1, 1975. His two out single drove in the deciding run in the Expos' 6–5 victory over Gene Garber and the Philadelphia Phillies.

W	L	PCT	ERA	G	GF	SV	IP	H	ER	R	HR	BB	K	WP	HBP	Fld%
53	50	.515	3.85	518	289	60	902.1	976	386	448	40	329	400	32	14	.920
