= Jim Gott =

American baseball player and coach (born 1959)

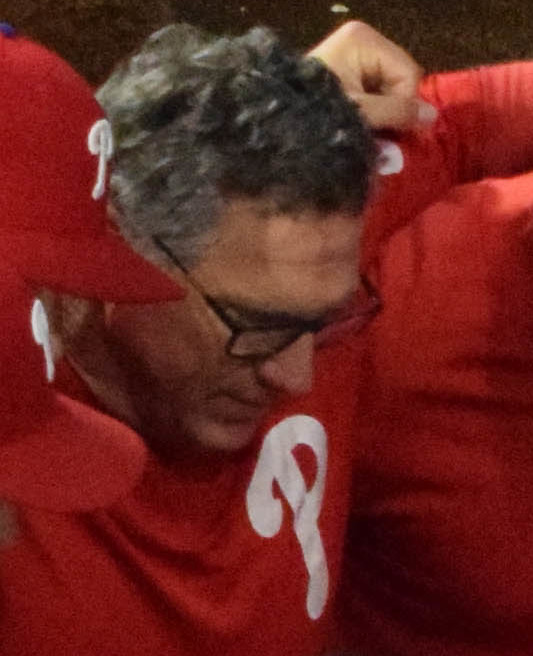
- Gott with the Philadelphia Phillies in 2018
- Pitcher
- Born: August 3, 1959 (age 67); Hollywood, California, U.S.
- Batted: Right Threw: Right

MLB debut
- April 9, 1982, for the Toronto Blue Jays

Last MLB appearance
- August 3, 1995, for the Pittsburgh Pirates

MLB statistics
- Win–loss record: 56–74
- Earned run average: 3.87
- Strikeouts: 837
- Saves: 91
- Stats at Baseball Reference

Teams
- Toronto Blue Jays (1982–1984); San Francisco Giants (1985–1987); Pittsburgh Pirates (1987–1989); Los Angeles Dodgers (1990–1994); Pittsburgh Pirates (1995)

James William Gott (born August 3, 1959) is an American professional baseball pitcher and coach. Gott pitched in Major League Baseball (MLB) for 14 years for the Toronto Blue Jays, San Francisco Giants, Pittsburgh Pirates, and Los Angeles Dodgers, from 1982 to 1995. He was the bullpen coach for the Philadelphia Phillies from 2018 through 2020.

== Career ==
=== Playing career ===
Gott was born in Hollywood, California. He graduated from San Marino High School in San Marino, California, in 1977.

In baseball, he was named his league's most valuable player that year. He committed to attend Brigham Young University (BYU) on a college football scholarship as a linebacker, and was also recruited for the school's baseball team.

The St. Louis Cardinals selected Gott in the fourth round of the 1977 Major League Baseball draft. He signed with the Cardinals for a $18,500 ($98,000 in current dollar terms) signing bonus, rather than follow through with his commitment to attend BYU. He began his professional career with the Calgary Cardinals of the Rookie-level Pioneer League.

Gott was the first pick in the Rule 5 draft by the Toronto Blue Jays in December 1981. In his minor league career, he was 28-42 with one save and a 4.71 ERA, in 626.2 innings over 131 games (104 of which were starts).

Gott made his major league debut in 1982. His first major league win was against Baseball Hall of Fame pitcher Jim Palmer of the Baltimore Orioles in May 1982. Gott's first major league win was a 6–0 decision over the Baltimore Orioles at Memorial Stadium on May 30, 1982 which was also the start of Cal Ripken Jr.'s MLB-record consecutive games played streak. In 1983, he was fifth in the American League in strikeouts per 9 innings pitched (6.164).

In January 1985, the Blue Jays traded Gott along with two minor league players to the San Francisco Giants for Gary Lavelle. On May 12, 1985, Gott hit two home runs against the St. Louis Cardinals.

The Pittsburgh Pirates claimed Gott off of waivers in 1987. In 1988, Gott broke Kent Tekulve's franchise single-season save record of 32 saves, ending the season with 34 saves (2nd in the NL). He was also 7th in the National League in games played (67). He had elbow surgery in May 1989, and missed most of the 1989 season.

The Los Angeles Dodgers signed Gott as a free agent after the 1989 season for $300,000 ($779,000 in current dollar terms). Gott was a setup pitcher and closer for the Los Angeles Dodgers from 1990 to 1994. In 1993, he was 9th in the National League in saves (25).

In his 14-year major league career, Gott was 56-74 with 91 saves and a 3.87 ERA in 1,120 innings over 554 games (96 of which were starts).

=== Radio hosting career ===
After retiring as an active player, Gott co-hosted Dodger Talk, a pre- and post-game radio show for the Dodgers for three years.

=== Coaching career ===
In 2010, the Los Angeles Angels of Anaheim hired Gott as their pitching coach for the Arizona League Angels of the Rookie-level Arizona League. On November 9, 2012, Gott was promoted to the Angels' minor league pitching coordinator. Gott served in that role through 2017.

On November 17, 2017, the Philadelphia Phillies named Gott their bullpen coach for the 2018 season. He remained with the club through the 2020 season, after which time his contract was not renewed.

Gott was named pitching coach for the AZL Athletics for the 2024 season.

In 2025, Gott was named pitching coach of the Stockton Ports the Single-A affiliate of the Athletics.

== Personal life ==
Gott's brother, Erich, attended BYU on a scholarship for golf. He resides in San Marino, California. He has six children, two of whom are autistic.

Gott taught Dennis Quaid to pitch for his portrayal of Jim Morris in the 2002 film The Rookie.

Preceded by Mark Bomback	Toronto Blue Jays Opening Day; Starting pitcher 1983	Succeeded by Doyle Alexander
