= Tom Dodd (baseball) =

American baseball player (born 1958)

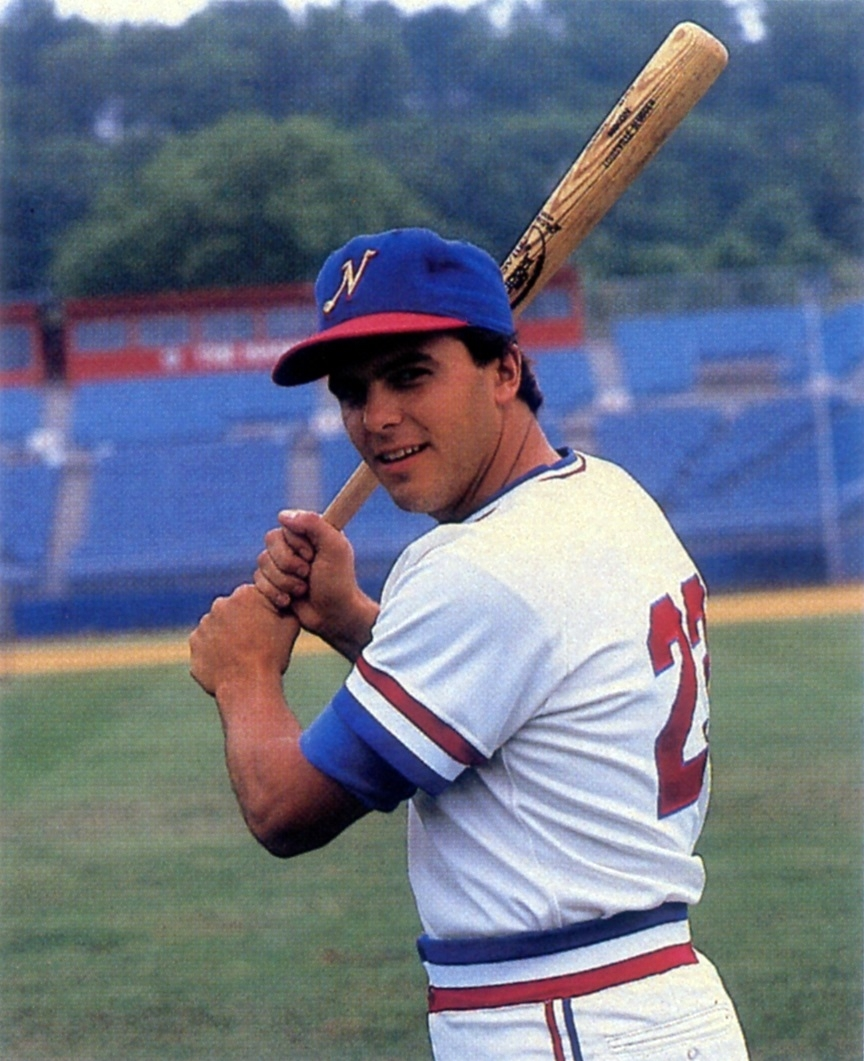
- Dodd with the Nashville Sounds in 1982
- Outfielder
- Born: August 15, 1958 (age 67); Portland, Oregon, U.S.
- Batted: Right Threw: Right

MLB debut
- July 25, 1986, for the Baltimore Orioles

Last MLB appearance
- August 6, 1986, for the Baltimore Orioles

MLB statistics
- Batting average: .231
- Home runs: 1
- Hits: 3
- Stats at Baseball Reference

Teams
- Baltimore Orioles (1986)

Thomas Marion Dodd (born August 15, 1958) is an American former professional baseball player. He had a short two-week stint in the major leagues with the 1986 Baltimore Orioles, but is likely best remembered for being one of the players included in the deal that brought Fred McGriff to the Toronto Blue Jays as a minor league prospect.

== Yankee farmhand ==
A highly touted prospect himself, Dodd was drafted by the Oakland Athletics out of the University of Oregon in the second round of the 1979 Major League Baseball draft, but did not sign. A year later, he was drafted by the New York Yankees in the first round (seventh overall) of the secondary phase of the 1980 Major League Baseball draft.

Dodd was an outfielder when he joined the Fort Lauderdale Yankees in 1980, though he played some first base and catcher during his minor league career as well. In 1981, Dodd hit 29 home runs and had 95 runs batted in as a member of the Greensboro Hornets.

== McGriff deal ==
Early in the 1982 season, he, fellow Yankees farmhand Jeff Reynolds and first baseman Dave Revering were traded to the Toronto Blue Jays for John Mayberry. After the season, the Yankees reacquired Dodd and relief pitcher Dale Murray for Fred McGriff, Dave Collins and Mike Morgan. Third baseman Graig Nettles was also supposed to be included in the deal, but when the Jays refused to give him a hefty bonus, the Yankees included cash in the deal to compensate.

== MLB debut ==
The Yankees released Dodd the following May. Shortly afterwards, he signed with the Chicago White Sox, with whom he remained through the 1984 season. The ChiSox released him just before the start of the 1985 minor league season. He signed with the Baltimore Orioles, and batted .300 for the first time in his career for the Orioles' Southern League and Carolina League affiliates.

Dodd's best season was 1986, when he batted .306 with thirty home runs for the Charlotte O's and Rochester Red Wings. Along the way, he earned a promotion to the big league club. He made his major league debut on July 25, drawing a walk in his only at-bat.

He entered seven games as a pinch hitter, remaining in one at third base, despite the fact that he had made very few appearances as a third baseman in his minor league career. He hit his only major league home run in his only major league start on August 1 when manager Earl Weaver used Dodd as his designated hitter against the Toronto Blue Jays.

Despite hitting a career high and team-record 37 home runs for the Charlotte O's in 1987, Dodd never returned to the majors. He spent three more seasons in the Kansas City Royals' and Seattle Mariners farm systems before retiring. In his final season as a pro, Dodd led the Pacific Coast League in RBI with 114 for the Calgary Cannons.
