= Mark Bomback (baseball) =

American baseball player (born 1953)

- Pitcher
- Born: April 14, 1953 (age 73); Portsmouth, Virginia, U.S.
- Batted: Right Threw: Right

MLB debut
- September 12, 1978, for the Milwaukee Brewers

Last MLB appearance
- July 21, 1982, for the Toronto Blue Jays

MLB statistics
- Win–loss record: 16–18
- Earned run average: 4.47
- Strikeouts: 124
- Stats at Baseball Reference

Teams
- Milwaukee Brewers (1978); New York Mets (1980); Toronto Blue Jays (1981–1982)

Mark Vincent Bomback (born April 14, 1953) is an American former professional baseball pitcher. Bomback played four Major League Baseball seasons with the Milwaukee Brewers, New York Mets and Toronto Blue Jays.

== Minor leagues ==
Bomback was drafted in the 25th round of the 1971 Major League Baseball draft by the Boston Red Sox. Over six seasons as a starting pitcher in the Bosox farm system, Bomback went 59–48 with a 4.21 earned run average and 681 strikeouts. He was released at the end of Spring training 1977, and signed as a free agent with the Milwaukee Brewers shortly afterwards. After going 12–6 with a 4.53 ERA for the Holyoke Millers in 1977, he was able to bring his ERA down to 3.16 in 1978, splitting his time between Holyoke and the triple A Spokane Indians.

== Milwaukee Brewers ==
He earned a call up to Milwaukee that September, and was hit hard in his major league debut against the Seattle Mariners. After striking out the first batter he faced, Bomback allowed a single, home run, another single and a double before he was able to retire another batter. When he walked the next batter, manager George Bamberger pulled him before he could complete an inning. He fared far better in his next appearance. Pitching a single inning of "mop up duty" against the Minnesota Twins, Bomback allowed one hit (to Hall of Famer Rod Carew), and retired the other three batters he faced.

Despite putting together an impressive 1979 season with the triple A Vancouver Canadians (22–7, 2.56 ERA, 151 SO), Bomback never returned to the majors with the Brewers. After the season, he was traded to the New York Mets for fellow pitcher Dwight Bernard.

== New York Mets ==
Bomback was an early invite to Spring training, and earned a job in the Mets' bullpen to start the 1980 season. With Mets ace Pat Zachry beginning the season on the disabled list, Tom Hausman replaced Zachry in the starting rotation. Following a poor performance by Hausman against the Philadelphia Phillies on April 22, Bomback was given the opportunity to start despite three unimpressive relief appearances (5 earned runs in 5.2 innings pitched). He responded by holding the Phillies to one run over seven innings the very next day to record his first major league victory. In his next start, he pitched a two hit shutout against the Phillies.

Upon Zachry's return, Bomback split time between starts and relief appearances. A July 29 victory over the Atlanta Braves, in which he held them scoreless through seven plus innings, marked his return to the starting rotation for the remainder of the season. A 4–1 victory over the St. Louis Cardinals on August 10 improved Bomback's record to 9–3 with a 3.83 ERA.

From there, however, he faltered. He managed just one more win over the remainder of the season while losing five. For the season, he led the Mets staff with ten victories, and his eight losses were also the least among Mets starters. His 4.09 ERA was third behind Craig Swan and Ray Burris.

During the off season, the Mets acquired former Cy Young Award winner Randy Jones. Coupled with the expected healthy return of Craig Swan, Bomback was squeezed out of the starting rotation. He was traded to the Toronto Blue Jays at the end of Spring training for a player to be named later (Charlie Puleo) as something of a favor to Bomback.

== Toronto Blue Jays ==
Bomback's career in Toronto got off to a good start. He was 3–1 with a 2.17 ERA following a May 3 victory over the Baltimore Orioles. From there, things went south for Bomback, as he went 0–4 with a 5.53 ERA over his next seven starts to close out the first half of the strike shortened 1981 season at 3–5 with a 4.11 ERA. When play resumed following the strike, Bomback was used in relief. He went 2–0 with a 3.10 ERA.

A strong Spring earned Bomback the opening day nod for the 1982 season. He would get tagged for six earned runs in just a third of an inning to log the worst opening day start in franchise history. A May 12 loss to the Chicago White Sox put his season record at 1–5 with a 6.86 ERA. He would make eight appearances in relief before being sent down to triple A Syracuse. He would pitch through 1984 with Syracuse, going 19–19 with a 3.75 ERA.

== Career stats ==
W	L	Pct	ERA	G	GS	GF	SHO	IP	H	ER	R	HR	BB	K	WP	HBP	BAA	Fld%	Avg.
16	18	.471	4.47	74	45	8	1	314.1	367	156	169	34	110	124	13	8	.295	.989	.233

Bomback proved to be an exceptional hitting pitcher his one season in the National League. His first major league hit was an RBI double off former Met Tom Seaver of the Cincinnati Reds. On May 2, his fourth inning bunt off Silvio Martinez helped increased the Mets' lead over the Cardinals to 5–1. He then drove Martinez out of the game in the fifth with a double that drove in two. On July 19, he went 2-for-4 with two runs and two RBIs in the Mets' 10–4 victory over the Cards.

In 1989, he pitched for the Winter Haven Super Sox of the Senior Professional Baseball Association.

== Sources ==
Preceded by Jim Clancy	Toronto Blue Jays Opening Day; Starting pitcher 1982	Succeeded by Dave Stieb
