= Steve Senteney =

American baseball player (1955–1989)

- Pitcher
- Born: August 7, 1955; Indianapolis, Indiana, U.S.
- Died: June 18, 1989 (aged 33); Colusa, California, U.S.
- Batted: Right Threw: Right

MLB debut
- June 6, 1982, for the Toronto Blue Jays

Last MLB appearance
- September 30, 1982, for the Toronto Blue Jays

MLB statistics
- Win–loss record: 0–0
- Earned run average: 4.92
- Strikeouts: 20
- Stats at Baseball Reference

Teams
- Toronto Blue Jays (1982)

Stephen Leonard Senteney III (August 7, 1955 – June 18, 1989) was an American Major League Baseball pitcher who played briefly in 1982 with the Toronto Blue Jays. He batted and threw right-handed and had a 0–0 record, with a 4.91 ERA in 11 games during his one-year career. Following his single season with Toronto, the Blue Jays traded him to the New York Mets for Jorge Orta.

Senteney was born in Indianapolis, Indiana.

He attended Casa Roble High School, where he tried out for and was cut from the school's baseball team in each of his first three years. After graduating in 1973, he served in the United States Marine Corps before enrolling at American River College. He played college baseball at American River but was cut during his first season. He then enrolled at Sierra College where he was cut from the baseball team before the start of the season. He dropped out and played amateur baseball in Sacramento, performing well enough to earn a scholarship to play for the Saint Mary's Gaels.

Senteney was killed in an automobile accident in Colusa, California at the age of 33.
