= Dick Davis (baseball) =

American baseball player (born 1953)

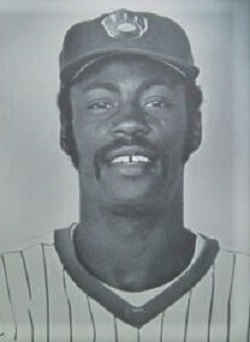
- Outfielder
- Born: September 25, 1953 (age 72); Long Beach, California, U.S.
- Batted: Right Threw: Right

Professional debut
- MLB: July 12, 1977, for the Milwaukee Brewers
- NPB: June 6, 1984, for the Kintetsu Buffaloes

Last appearance
- MLB: October 1, 1982, for the Pittsburgh Pirates
- NPB: June 5, 1988, for the Kintetsu Buffaloes

MLB statistics
- Batting average: .265
- Home runs: 27
- Runs batted in: 141

NPB statistics
- Batting average: .331
- Home runs: 117
- Runs batted in: 322
- Stats at Baseball Reference

Teams
- Milwaukee Brewers (1977–1980); Philadelphia Phillies (1981–1982); Toronto Blue Jays (1982); Pittsburgh Pirates (1982); Kintetsu Buffaloes (1984–1988)

Career highlights and awards
- Best Nine Award (1985)

Richard Earl Davis (born September 25, 1953) is an American former professional baseball player. He played all or part of six seasons in Major League Baseball from 1977 until 1982, primarily as an outfielder. He also played five seasons in Japan with the Kintetsu Buffaloes from 1984 until 1988. His cousin was former infielder Enos Cabell.

== Amateur career ==
Davis attended Compton High School in California where he played on the school's baseball team with Odell Jones, Reggie Walton, Gary Ward and LaRue Washington.

== Professional career ==
=== Brewers ===
Davis was signed as an amateur free agent by the Milwaukee Brewers in 1972. After several years in the minors, he was called up to the Brewers in July 1977. He split time in the outfield and as a designated hitter for the next four seasons, being used at DH more often than any other Brewer between 1978 and 1980.

=== Phillies ===
During spring training in 1981, the Brewers traded Davis to the Philadelphia Phillies for pitcher Randy Lerch. Davis played some right field and also came off the bench as a pinch hitter 20 times. Though Davis missed most of July and August with an injury, he had 96 at bats and hit .333 with 19 runs batted in. Davis continued in the same role to start the 1982 season, but was soon on the move again.

=== Wayne Nordhagen and end of Major League Baseball career ===
In June 1982, Davis would be traded not once, but twice, each time for the same player. At the June 15 trading deadline, the Phillies first traded him to the Toronto Blue Jays for outfielder Wayne Nordhagen. While the Phillies sent Nordhagen on to the Pittsburgh Pirates on the same day in exchange for another outfielder, Bill Robinson, Davis stayed in Toronto for an entire week, appearing in three games and going 2-for-7 at the plate. On June 22, the Blue Jays traded Davis to the Pirates for a player to be named later. On June 25, the Pirates sent a player to the Blue Jays — and it was Nordhagen.

Davis struggled for the rest of the season in Pittsburgh, batting .182 in 77 at bats. Not a very good defensive outfielder, Davis needed to hit well to keep his job, and Pittsburgh wound up releasing Davis in March 1983.

=== Japanese career ===
Davis found a second career with the Kintetsu Buffaloes of the Japanese Pacific League, who signed him for the 1984 season. While Davis hit a .310 with 18 home runs in 1984, he broke out in 1985, hitting 40 home runs, driving in 109 runs, and batting .343 in 128 games. During the season, he hit home runs in six straight games to tie a league record. He repeated his success in 1986, batting .337. In 1987, he drove in nine runs in one game on April 28.

Davis also had his share of troubles in Japan. In 1986, he charged the mound after being hit by a pitch by Osamu Higashio and was fined 100,000 yen. Then, in 1988, his apartment was raided by the Japanese police, who found 14 grams of marijuana and related paraphernalia. After three weeks in police custody, he was released by the Buffaloes and sent home to the United States, with Ralph Bryant filling the void left by his departure on the Buffaloes.
