= Mark Eichhorn =

American baseball player (born 1960)

- Pitcher
- Born: November 21, 1960 (age 65); San Jose, California, U.S.
- Batted: Right Threw: Right

MLB debut
- August 30, 1982, for the Toronto Blue Jays

Last MLB appearance
- September 14, 1996, for the California Angels

MLB statistics
- Win–loss record: 48–43
- Earned run average: 3.00
- Strikeouts: 640
- Saves: 32
- Stats at Baseball Reference

Teams
- Toronto Blue Jays (1982, 1986–1988); Atlanta Braves (1989); California Angels (1990–1992); Toronto Blue Jays (1992–1993); Baltimore Orioles (1994); California Angels (1996)

Career highlights and awards
- 2× World Series champion (1992, 1993)

Mark Anthony Eichhorn (born November 21, 1960) is an American former Major League Baseball pitcher best known for his tenure with the Toronto Blue Jays in the late 1980s and the early 1990s when he often served as a middle reliever/set-up man for All-Star closer Tom Henke. He was the 1986 American League Rookie Pitcher of the Year for the Blue Jays, a campaign in which he set team records for rookie relief in ERA, games, wins, and strikeouts.

Eichhorn pitched with four different ballclubs during his career: the Toronto Blue Jays (1982, 1986–1988, 1992–1993), Atlanta Braves (1989), California Angels (1990–1992, 1996), and Baltimore Orioles (1994). Eichhorn appeared in his final game on September 14, 1996.

== Career ==
=== First stint with the Toronto Blue Jays ===
Eichhorn made his major league debut with the Toronto Blue Jays in 1982 but suffered a severe shoulder injury after which he did not return to the majors until 1986. The shoulder injury had robbed Eichhorn of most of his fastball velocity and had forced him to turn to an unconventional sidearm motion in which his arm angle was well below the belt when he released the ball. Eichhorn was notable for an exceptionally low velocity for a major league pitcher though his control and unusual delivery made him an effective player.

In his first year of the new pitching style, 1986, he was the easy American League ERA leader with 1.72, more than three-quarters of a run ahead of Cy Young Award winner Roger Clemens, but fell five innings pitched short of qualifying for the ERA title. Manager Jimy Williams offered him a chance to make those five innings with a start at the end of the season, but Eichhorn declined.

=== Atlanta Braves ===
On March 29, 1989, the Toronto Blue Jays sold Eichhorn's contract to the Atlanta Braves. Eichhorn played one season with Atlanta, pitching to a 4.35 ERA in 68 1/3 innings. The Braves released Eichhorn on November 20 that year, after the season's conclusion.

=== First stint with the California Angels ===
On December 19, 1989, Eichhorn signed with the California Angels. Now back in the American League, Eichhorn rebounded to better form in 1990, as he had a career-high 13 saves and a 3.08 ERA in 84 2/3 innings. Although Eichhorn led the Angels in saves for the first half of the season, Bryan Harvey, who was splitting save opportunities with Eichhorn up to that point, earned the remainder of the saves for the rest of the season. With Harvey being the full-time closer for the 1991 season, Eichhorn returned to a middle relief role that season and saw noticeable improvement, pitching to a 1.98 ERA in 81 2/3 innings and earning a career-high 25 holds.

It was with the Angels that Eichhorn developed a reputation for being particularly hard for hitters to hit a home run off of. Between 1990 and 1991, Eichhorn surrendered just four home runs in 166 1/3 innings pitched. In 1991, Eichhorn also set a major league record by not surrendering a walk across his first 30 games pitched. This record was tied by Kenley Jansen in 2017.

In 1992, Eichhorn had a 2.38 ERA in 56 2/3 innings with the Angels.

=== Second stint with the Blue Jays ===
On July 30, 1992, the Angels traded Eichhorn back to the Toronto Blue Jays in exchange for Rob Ducey and Greg Myers. Reunited with the Blue Jays, Eichhorn recorded a 4.35 ERA in 31 innings over the remainder of his split 1992 season. Between the Angels and Blue Jays, Eichhorn had a 3.08 ERA in 87 2/3 innings in the 1992 season.

Eichhorn pitched in the postseason for the first time in his career with the Blue Jays in the 1992 postseason. Between the 1992 ALCS and World Series, Eichhorn pitched one scoreless inning in each of them, pitching in Game 5 in each respective series, both times pitching in games while the Blue Jays were trailing and ultimately lost.

At the conclusion of the 1992 season, Eichhorn, now a World Series champion, hit the free agent market once again. On January 6, 1993, Eichhorn re-signed with the Blue Jays. In his first full season back in Toronto in 1993, Eichhorn recorded a 2.72 ERA in 71 innings.

Eichhorn once again made two pitching appearances for the Blue Jays in the 1993 postseason, once in the ALCS and again in the World Series. Eichhorn once again only came in to pitch when the Blue Jays were trailing and ultimately lost the games he pitched in. Eichhorn's appearance in Game 3 of the ALCS was his most significant relief appearance in the postseason, as Pat Hentgen was chased early in the game. Eichhorn relieved Danny Cox, who himself pitched three innings of relief. After a clean seventh inning, Eichhorn managed to strand Chicago White Sox baserunners Tim Raines and Frank Thomas on the corners with two outs in the eighth, and was then relieved by Tony Castillo. In Game 2 of the World Series, Eichhorn was the third pitcher the Blue Jays used, with Dave Stewart and Tony Castillo already giving up 6 runs between them. Eichhorn recorded just one out and allowed a single and a walk before being relieved by Mike Timlin. This was Eichhorn's last postseason appearance.

At season's end, the now two-time World Series champion Eichhorn was once again a free agent.

=== Baltimore Orioles ===
On December 14, 1993, Eichhorn signed with the Baltimore Orioles. In the strike-shortened 1994 season, Eichhorn was the team's main long reliever, leading the team in relief innings pitched. Eichhorn had a 2.15 ERA in 71 innings pitched, giving up just one home run on the season. Eichhorn was one of eleven relievers to clear the 70 inning mark that season.

Eichhorn remained with the Orioles in 1995, but missed the entire season due to a torn rotator cuff. He became a free agent once again at the conclusion of the 1995 season.

=== Second stint with the California Angels ===
On February 6, 1996, Eichhorn signed with the California Angels. Eichhorn struggled in his last season in the major leagues, managing a 5.04 ERA in 30 1/3 innings. He re-entered free agency at the end of the season.

=== Comeback attempts ===
Between 1997 and 2000, Eichhorn attempted multiple times to make a comeback. In the 1997 season, Eichhorn signed with the expansion Tampa Bay Devil Rays on a minor league contract for the 1998 season. He pitched the full season at Triple-A Durham, pitching to a 3.88 ERA and 18 saves in 58 innings. Eichhorn temporarily retired after the season due to elbow tendonitis.

In 1999, Eichhorn attempted another comeback, this time partaking in a tryout with the Los Angeles Dodgers. The tryout failed, but Eichhorn took part in another tryout in 2000 with the Toronto Blue Jays, with whom he signed a minor league contract. His hopes of being called up in September were not fulfilled, and Eichhorn retired for good after the season.

=== Fielding ===
Eichorn was a solid fielding pitcher in his 11-year major league career, posting a .992 fielding percentage, committing only two errors in 243 total chances over 885 2/3 innings and 563 games. His only miscues occurred on August 19, 1987, against the Oakland A's and on July 4, 1992, against the Toronto Blue Jays.

== Personal life ==
Eichhorn is currently the pitching coach for Aptos High School in Aptos, California.

Mark coached his 12-year-old son, Kevin, on the Aptos Little League team which won the Little League West Regional and played in the Little League World Series in Williamsport, Pennsylvania, in 2002, as chronicled in the movie Small Ball.

Kevin was later drafted in the third round, 104th overall, by the Arizona Diamondbacks in the 2008 MLB Draft, deciding to sign instead of attending Santa Clara University, where he had been committed since his junior year of high school.

On January 24, 2011, Kevin was traded to the Detroit Tigers organization in a deal for pitcher Armando Galarraga, pitching through the 2014 season, finishing with a minor league career mark of 26-23 and a 3.73 ERA in 89 games.

Mark has five children, four sons and one daughter. Kevin (1990), Brian (1991), Steven (1995), Sarah (1999), and David (2001).
