= Joey McLaughlin =

American baseball player (born 1956)

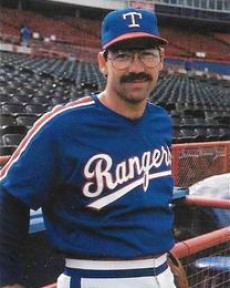
- Pitcher
- Born: July 11, 1956 (age 68); Tulsa, Oklahoma, U.S.
- Batted: Right Threw: Right

MLB debut
- June 11, 1977, for the Atlanta Braves

Last MLB appearance
- September 25, 1984, for the Texas Rangers

MLB statistics
- Win–loss record: 29–28
- Earned run average: 3.85
- Strikeouts: 268
- Stats at Baseball Reference

Teams
- Atlanta Braves (1977, 1979); Toronto Blue Jays (1980–1984); Texas Rangers (1984)

Joey Richard McLaughlin (born July 11, 1956) is an American former professional baseball player who was a right-handed relief pitcher in Major League Baseball from 1977 to 1984. He played for the Atlanta Braves, Toronto Blue Jays, and Texas Rangers. McLaughlin was drafted by the Braves in the second round of the 1974 amateur draft.

He played his first game with the Braves on June 11, 1977, against the Philadelphia Phillies. McLaughlin did not play for the Braves in 1978, then returned to the team for the 1979 season.

After the 1979 season, McLaughlin was traded to the Toronto Blue Jays along with Barry Bonnell and Pat Rockett in exchange for Chris Chambliss and Luis Gómez.

Almost exclusively used as a reliever, McLaughlin became increasingly unpopular in Toronto in the 1983 season in which he recorded 9 saves, but also recorded 11 blown saves. He remained with the Blue Jays until May 13, 1984, when he was released by the team. McLaughlin was signed by the Texas Rangers ten days later on May 23, but was released by the Rangers after the season, ending his career.
