= Alfredo Griffin =

Dominican baseball player (born 1957)

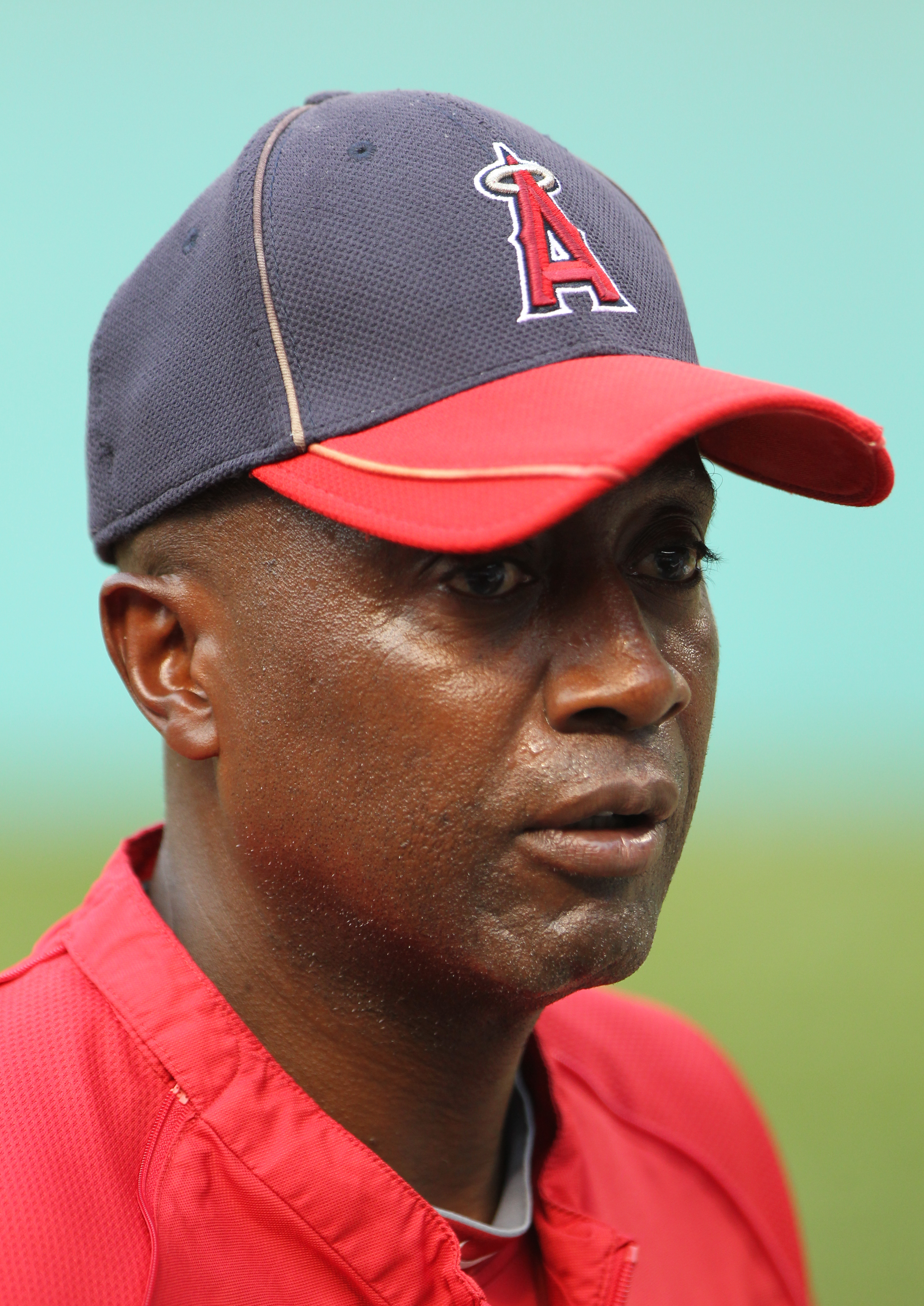
- Griffin with the Los Angeles Angels in 2011
- Shortstop
- Born: October 6, 1957 (age 68); Santo Domingo, Dominican Republic
- Batted: Switch Threw: Right

MLB debut
- September 4, 1976, for the Cleveland Indians

Last MLB appearance
- October 3, 1993, for the Toronto Blue Jays

MLB statistics
- Batting average: .249
- Home runs: 24
- Runs batted in: 527
- Stats at Baseball Reference

Teams
- As player: Cleveland Indians (1976–1978); Toronto Blue Jays (1979–1984); Oakland Athletics (1985–1987); Los Angeles Dodgers (1988–1991); Toronto Blue Jays (1992–1993); As coach: Toronto Blue Jays (1996–1997); Anaheim Angels / Los Angeles Angels of Anaheim / Los Angeles Angels (2000–2018)

Career highlights and awards
- All-Star (1984); 4× World Series champion (1988, 1992, 1993, 2002); AL Rookie of the Year (1979); Gold Glove Award (1985)

Alfredo Claudino Baptist Read Griffin (born October 6, 1957) is a Dominican former professional baseball shortstop. He played in Major League Baseball (MLB) from 1976 to 1993 for the Cleveland Indians, Toronto Blue Jays, Oakland Athletics, and Los Angeles Dodgers.

== Playing career ==
Griffin began his career as a member of the Cleveland Indians, who signed him as an amateur free agent in 1973. On December 5, 1978, before having played a full season in the majors, he was traded, along with Phil Lansford (minors), to the Toronto Blue Jays for Víctor Cruz. Griffin made an immediate impact, sharing the American League Rookie of the Year Award in 1979 with John Castino.

In 1980, Griffin led the majors in triples, tying Willie Wilson of the Kansas City Royals with 15; both Griffin and Wilson set an AL record for most triples in a single season by a switch-hitter. Five years later in 1985, Wilson himself shattered the record that he shared with Griffin by tallying 21 triples.

In 1984, Griffin was named to the All-Star team. This was explained by John Feinstein of The Washington Post as: "Making the All-Star team the hard way: Major league baseball pays the expenses for each player here and for one guest. In most cases, players bring wives or girlfriends. Dámaso García, the Toronto Blue Jays' second baseman, brought his shortstop, Alfredo Griffin. When the Tigers' Alan Trammell hurt his arm and could not play tonight, Manager Joe Altobelli named Griffin to the team, partly because he's a fine player, but mostly because he was here."

Griffin spent six years with the Blue Jays from 1979 to 1984, playing in 392 consecutive games. He was traded after the 1984 season to the Oakland Athletics, where, despite his reluctance to draw walks and a tendency to be overaggressive on the basepaths, he began to harness the offensive promise that he showed in 1980. Griffin won the American League Gold Glove Award in 1985.

After establishing personal bests in most offensive categories with the Athletics, Griffin was traded to the Los Angeles Dodgers for Bob Welch prior to the 1988 season. The three-team trade, which included the New York Mets, also netted the Dodgers Jay Howell and Jesse Orosco. All three teams involved in the deal would go on to win their respective divisions in 1988. A Dwight Gooden fastball broke Griffin's hand in May 1988, causing him to miss some time, but he returned to start all 12 of the Dodgers' postseason games at shortstop in 1988, winning his first World Series title.

In 1990, Griffin became the last player to finish last in the National League, of those who qualified for the batting title, in batting average, on-base percentage, and slugging percentage.

Griffin returned to Toronto in 1992 and was a bench player as the Blue Jays won the first of two consecutive championships. On October 23, 1993, he stood on deck as Joe Carter faced Mitch Williams in the ninth inning of Game Six. His career came to an end moments later when Carter homered to win the World Series for Toronto.

Griffin was the first player in major league history to have started three times for the opposing line-ups in a perfect game: against Len Barker (Cleveland) in 1981 for the Toronto Blue Jays, then against Tom Browning (Cincinnati) in 1988 and Dennis Martínez (Montreal) in 1991, both for the Los Angeles Dodgers.

Griffin ended his 18-year playing career with a .249 batting average, 24 home runs, 527 runs batted in, and a 67 OPS+ in 1,962 games played. Writer Bill James named Griffin the most aggressive baserunner of the 1980s.

== Coaching career ==
Griffin coached for the Toronto Blue Jays in 1996 and 1997. He was the first base coach for the Los Angeles Angels of Anaheim in MLB from 2000 to 2018, and also for the Estrellas Orientales (Eastern Stars) in his native Dominican Republic's Winter League.

== See also ==
- List of Major League Baseball players from the Dominican Republic
- List of Major League Baseball annual triples leaders

Preceded by George Hendrick	Anaheim / Los Angeles Angels first base coach 2000–2015	Succeeded by Gary DiSarcina
