= Jim Clancy (baseball) =

American baseball player (1955–2025)

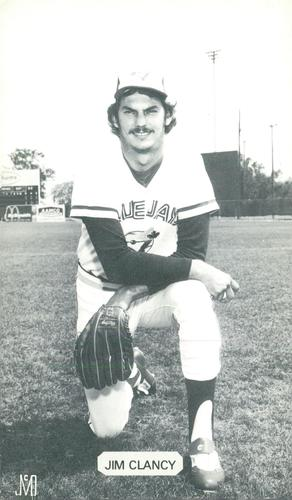
- Pitcher
- Born: December 18, 1955; Chicago, Illinois, U.S.
- Died: July 12, 2025 (aged 69); Dunedin, Florida, U.S.
- Batted: Right Threw: Right

MLB debut
- July 26, 1977, for the Toronto Blue Jays

Last MLB appearance
- October 6, 1991, for the Atlanta Braves

MLB statistics
- Win–loss record: 140–167
- Earned run average: 4.23
- Strikeouts: 1,422
- Stats at Baseball Reference

Teams
- Toronto Blue Jays (1977–1988); Houston Astros (1989–1991); Atlanta Braves (1991)

Career highlights and awards
- All-Star (1982)

James Clancy (December 18, 1955 – July 12, 2025) was an American professional baseball starting pitcher. He played in Major League Baseball (MLB) for the Toronto Blue Jays (1977–88), Houston Astros (1989–91), and Atlanta Braves (1991). He batted and threw right-handed.

== Playing career ==
=== Texas Rangers ===
Clancy attended St. Rita of Cascia High School on the south side of Chicago and was drafted by the Texas Rangers in the fourth round (74th overall) of the 1974 Major League Baseball draft. Clancy played rookie-level baseball with the Rangers Gulf Coast League affiliate, where he had a record of 3–3 with a 2.72 ERA in nine starts.

The Rangers moved Clancy up to the Anderson Rangers of the Western Carolinas League for the 1975 season, however, despite a respectable ERA of 3.83 in 23 starts, Clancy had a poor 6–13 record. Texas moved Clancy up to the San Antonio Brewers of the Texas League in 1976, however, he had a rough season, posting a record of 6–8 with a 6.41 in 23 starts. He was left unprotected in the 1976 MLB Expansion Draft, and was selected by the Toronto Blue Jays with the sixth pick.

=== Toronto Blue Jays ===
Clancy began his Blue Jays career playing with the Cleveland Indians' Double-A affiliate, the Jersey City Indians of the Eastern League. Despite having a poor season with the team, where he had a 5–13 record and 4.88 ERA in 20 starts, the Blue Jays called him up to the Major League level. Clancy made his MLB debut on July 26, 1977, against the Texas Rangers at Exhibition Stadium. Clancy started the game, however, he lasted only two innings, allowing five runs as the Rangers routed Toronto 14–0. Clancy earned his first major league victory in his next start, pitching a complete game, allowing seven hits and one earned run as Toronto defeated the Milwaukee Brewers 3–2. Clancy would finish the year with a 4–9 record with a 5.05 ERA.

In 1978, Clancy spent his first full season with the Blue Jays, earning a 10–12 record with a 4.09 ERA in 31 games. He had an injury-plagued season in 1979, where he had a 2–7 record and a 5.51 ERA in 12 games.

Clancy had a solid season in 1980, as he had a 13–16 record with a 3.30 ERA and 15 complete games, before struggling in the 1981 season, as Clancy had a 6–12 record with a 4.90 ERA.

In 1982, Clancy posted his first winning season, as he had a 16–14 record, starting a league high 40 games, and appearing in the 1982 Major League Baseball All-Star Game, where he pitched a perfect fourth inning.

Clancy had another solid season in 1983, compiling a record of 15–11 with a 3.91 ERA, as the Blue Jays had their first ever winning season.

Clancy struggled in 1984, as he had a losing record for the first time in three seasons, with a 13–15 record, and a 4.64 ERA in a league high 36 starts. He led the league in earned runs allowed with 125. His 1985 season would be injury plagued, however, Clancy pitched effectively, earning a 9–6 record and a 3.78 ERA as Toronto made the post-season for the first time in team history. The injured Clancy pitched in only one inning in the 1985 ALCS as Toronto lost to the Kansas City Royals in seven games.

Clancy had a disappointing 1986 season, as he posted a 14–14 record with a 3.94 ERA, followed by a strong year in 1987, in which the pitcher had a 15–11 record and a 3.54 ERA as the Blue Jays failed to qualify for the playoffs in both years. Clancy spent his final season with Toronto in 1988, where he struggled with a record of 11–13 and a 4.49 ERA, as the Jays once again missed the playoffs.

=== Houston Astros ===
Clancy became a free agent after the 1988 season, and signed a contract with the Houston Astros. He made his Astros debut on April 8, 1989, pitching 8 1/3 innings and allowing two runs in a 6–2 win over the San Diego Padres at The Astrodome. He would struggle as the season went along, sporting a record of 7–14 with a 5.08 ERA as the Astros finished in third place in the National League West.

Clancy split time between starting and working out of the bullpen in 1990, where he struggled with a 2–8 record and a 6.51 ERA, and had a stint with the Tucson Toros, the Astros' Triple-A affiliate in the Pacific Coast League. In 1991, Clancy spent the season working out of the bullpen, and despite a 0–3 record, he was effective, as he had a 2.78 ERA in 30 games and earned five saves. On July 31, 1991, Clancy was traded to the Atlanta Braves in exchange for Matt Turner.

=== Atlanta Braves ===
Clancy appeared in 24 games with the Atlanta Braves, all out of the bullpen, as he posted a 3–2 record with a 5.71 ERA, helping Atlanta win the National League West division. In the 1991 NLCS, Clancy made only one appearance, getting the only batter out that he faced as the Braves defeated the Pittsburgh Pirates to earn a spot in the World Series. Clancy pitched in three games during the 1991 World Series, and earned his first ever post-season victory in the third game of the series as Atlanta defeated the Minnesota Twins 5–4 in twelve innings. Clancy finished the series with a 1–0 record with a 4.15 ERA, but the Twins won the series in seven games.

Clancy became a free agent after the season, and signed a minor league deal with the Chicago Cubs, but he retired during spring training in 1992.

== Death ==
Clancy died of cancer at his home on Dunedin, Florida, on July 12, 2025, at the age of 69. His death was announced by the Blue Jays organization two days later.

Preceded by Dave Lemanczyk	Toronto Blue Jays Opening Day; Starting pitcher 1981	Succeeded by Mark Bomback
Preceded by Dave Stieb	Toronto Blue Jays Opening Day; Starting pitcher 1984	Succeeded by Dave Stieb
