= Dámaso García =

Dominican Republic baseball player (1957–2020)

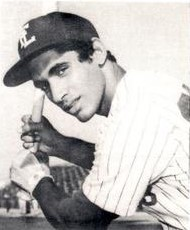
- Second baseman
- Born: 7 February 1957; Moca, Dominican Republic
- Died: 15 April 2020 (aged 63); San Pedro de Macorís, Dominican Republic
- Batted: Right Threw: Right

MLB debut
- June 24, 1978, for the New York Yankees

Last MLB appearance
- September 12, 1989, for the Montreal Expos

MLB statistics
- Batting average: .283
- Home runs: 36
- Runs batted in: 323
- Stolen bases: 203
- Stats at Baseball Reference

Teams
- New York Yankees (1978–1979); Toronto Blue Jays (1980–1986); Atlanta Braves (1988); Montreal Expos (1989)

Career highlights and awards
- 2× All-Star (1984, 1985); Silver Slugger Award (1982)

Dámaso Domingo García Sánchez (7 February 1957 – 15 April 2020) was a Dominican professional baseball second baseman, best known for his time spent with the Toronto Blue Jays of Major League Baseball (MLB), in the 1980s.

García was originally a footballer. In 1974, he was the club captain of Universidad Católica Madre y Maestra. That year, García also played as the captain for the Dominican Republic national football team at the 1974 Central American and Caribbean Games in Santo Domingo.

== Playing career ==
García made his major league debut in 1978 with the New York Yankees. He played in 29 games over the following two seasons, before being traded with Chris Chambliss and Paul Mirabella to the Toronto Blue Jays for Tom Underwood, Rick Cerone, and Ted Wilborn, prior to the 1980 season.

As Toronto's regular second baseman from 1980 through 1986, García batted over .300 twice (1982 and 1983), with his .310 mark placing him 6th in the American League (AL), in 1982. García posted 54 stolen bases in 1982 (2nd in the AL) and 46 in 1984 (6th in the AL), and was an All-Star twice (1984–85). He also won the 1982 Silver Slugger Award.

García batted leadoff during most of his tenure with the Blue Jays but was dropped to the ninth spot in the order at the beginning of the 1986 season, where he struggled to adjust. On 14 May 1986, following a loss to the Oakland Athletics, García burned his uniform in the hopes of ending the slump. This move angered Toronto manager Jimy Williams, who confronted his second baseman in front of the entire team and strained García's relationship with the Blue Jays. He was traded along with Luis Leal to the Atlanta Braves for Craig McMurtry, just before 1987 spring training.

Following the trade, García struggled to find a big league home. He briefly played with the Braves in 1988 and the Montreal Expos in 1989, but failed to make the cut during the same period with the Los Angeles Dodgers and New York Yankees. García retired, having compiled a .283 career batting average, 36 home runs, 323 runs batted in (RBI), 490 runs, and 203 stolen bases.

== Illness and death ==
A year after he retired, García started to have double vision; he was diagnosed with a malignant brain tumor. In 1991, García had the tumor removed and was told he only had six months to live.

The effects of the tumor left García with limited speech and difficulty performing certain functions, such as driving a car. He recovered enough to throw out the first pitch at a Blue Jays playoff game in 1992.

García ran a baseball camp in the Dominican Republic for children who have haemophilia, a condition afflicting his oldest son.

García died in San Pedro de Macorís, on 15 April 2020, at the age of 63 due to cancer.

== See also ==
- List of players from Dominican Republic in Major League Baseball
- List of Major League Baseball career stolen bases leaders
