= Batting average against =

Baseball statistic

Sandy Koufax had a .179 batting average against in 1965, the best in Major League Baseball for that season.

In baseball statistics, batting average against (denoted by BAA or AVG), also known as opponents' batting average (denoted by OBA), (Note: Not to be confused with on-base average (OBA), more commonly known as on-base percentage (OBP).) is a statistic that measures a pitcher's ability to prevent hits during official at bats. It can alternatively be described as the league's hitters' combined batting average against the pitcher.

== Definition ==
Batting average against is calculated as:

$BAA = \frac{H}{BF-BB-HBP-SH-SF-CINT}$

for which:

- H is the number of hits allowed by the pitcher
- BF is the number of batters faced
- BB is the number of base on balls
- HBP is the number of hit batsmen
- SH is the number of sacrifice hits
- SF is the number of sacrifice flies
- CINT is the number of catcher's interference

For example, if a pitcher faced 125 batters and allowed 25 hits, issued 8 walks, hit 1 batsman, allowed 2 sacrifice hits, allowed 3 sacrifice flies, and had 1 instance of catcher's interference, the pitcher's BAA would be calculated as:

$BAA = \frac{25}{125-8-1-2-3-1} = \frac{25}{110} = .227$

Reference site Baseball-Reference.com more simply defines BAA as hits divided by at bats, as "at bats" for a pitcher equates to the above noted denominator (batters faced less walks, hit by pitch, sacrifice hits, sacrifice flies, and catcher's interference): (Note: See section "Player Batting Against", hover over "BA" column header.)

$BAA = \frac{H}{AB}$

For example, in 2021, Max Scherzer had the best (lowest) batting average against in Major League Baseball among qualified pitchers. (Note: See section "Player Batting Against", sort by column "BA".) Scherzer's BAA for the 2021 season was:

$BAA = \frac{H}{AB} = \frac{119}{644} = .185$

== See also ==
- Hits per nine innings (H/9)
- Walks plus hits per inning pitched (WHIP)
