= 1985 in baseball =

The following are the baseball events of the year 1985 throughout the world.

== Champions ==
=== Major League Baseball ===
- World Series: Kansas City Royals over St. Louis Cardinals (4–3); Bret Saberhagen, MVP

League Championship Series (ALCS, NLCS)
East | Toronto | 3
West | Kansas City | 4
East | St. Louis | 4
West | Los Angeles | 2

World Series
AL | Kansas City | 4
NL | St. Louis | 3

- American League Championship Series MVP: George Brett
- National League Championship Series MVP: Ozzie Smith
- All-Star Game, July 16 at the Metrodome: National League, 6–1; LaMarr Hoyt, MVP

=== Other champions ===
- Caribbean World Series: Tigres del Licey (Dominican Republic)
- College World Series: Miami (Florida)
- Japan Series: Hanshin Tigers over Seibu Lions (4–2)
- Big League World Series: Broward County, Florida
- Junior League World Series: Tampa, Florida
- Little League World Series: Seoul National, Seoul, South Korea
- Senior League World Series: Pingtung, Taiwan

== Awards and honors ==
- Baseball Hall of Fame
  - Lou Brock
  - Enos Slaughter
  - Arky Vaughan
  - Hoyt Wilhelm

Baseball Writers' Association of America Awards
| BBWAA Award | National League | American League |
|---|---|---|
| Rookie of the Year | Vince Coleman (STL) | Ozzie Guillen (CWS) |
| Manager of the Year | Whitey Herzog (STL) | Bobby Cox (TOR) |
| Cy Young Award | Dwight Gooden (NYM) | Bret Saberhagen (KC) |
| Most Valuable Player | Willie McGee (STL) | Don Mattingly (NYY) |
Gold Glove Awards
| Position | National League | American League |
| Pitcher | Rick Reuschel (PIT) | Ron Guidry (NYY) |
| Catcher | Tony Peña (PIT) | Lance Parrish (DET) |
| First Baseman | Keith Hernandez (NYM) | Don Mattingly (NYY) |
| Second Baseman | Ryne Sandberg (CHC) | Lou Whitaker (DET) |
| Third Baseman | Tim Wallach (MON) | George Brett (KC) |
| Shortstop | Ozzie Smith (STL) | Alfredo Griffin (OAK) |
| Outfielders | Andre Dawson (MON) | Dwight Evans (BOS) |
| Outfielders | Willie McGee (STL) | Dwayne Murphy (OAK) |
| Outfielders | Dale Murphy (ATL) | Gary Pettis (CAL); Dave Winfield (NYY) |

- Woman Executive of the Year (major or minor league): Frances Crockett, Charlotte Orioles, Southern League

== Statistical leaders ==
| | American League | | National League | |
| Stat | Player | Total | Player | Total |
|---|---|---|---|---|
| AVG | Wade Boggs (BOS) | .368 | Willie McGee (STL) | .353 |
| HR | Darrell Evans (DET) | 40 | Dale Murphy (ATL) | 37 |
| RBI | Don Mattingly (NYY) | 145 | Dave Parker (CIN) | 125 |
| W | Ron Guidry (NYY) | 22 | Dwight Gooden^{1} (NYM) | 24 |
| ERA | Dave Stieb (TOR) | 2.48 | Dwight Gooden^{1} (NYM) | 1.53 |
| K | Bert Blyleven (MIN/CLE) | 206 | Dwight Gooden^{1} (NYM) | 268 |

^{1} Major league Triple Crown pitching winner

== Major league baseball final standings ==
=== American League final standings ===
AL East
| Team | W | L | Pct. | GB | Home | Road |
|---|---|---|---|---|---|---|
| ^{(1)} Toronto Blue Jays | 99 | 62 | .615 | — | 54‍–‍26 | 45‍–‍36 |
| New York Yankees | 97 | 64 | .602 | 2 | 58‍–‍22 | 39‍–‍42 |
| Detroit Tigers | 84 | 77 | .522 | 15 | 44‍–‍37 | 40‍–‍40 |
| Baltimore Orioles | 83 | 78 | .516 | 16 | 45‍–‍36 | 38‍–‍42 |
| Boston Red Sox | 81 | 81 | .500 | 18½ | 43‍–‍37 | 38‍–‍44 |
| Milwaukee Brewers | 71 | 90 | .441 | 28 | 40‍–‍40 | 31‍–‍50 |
| Cleveland Indians | 60 | 102 | .370 | 39½ | 38‍–‍43 | 22‍–‍59 |

AL West
| Team | W | L | Pct. | GB | Home | Road |
|---|---|---|---|---|---|---|
| ^{(2)} Kansas City Royals | 91 | 71 | .562 | — | 50‍–‍32 | 41‍–‍39 |
| California Angels | 90 | 72 | .556 | 1 | 49‍–‍30 | 41‍–‍42 |
| Chicago White Sox | 85 | 77 | .525 | 6 | 45‍–‍36 | 40‍–‍41 |
| Minnesota Twins | 77 | 85 | .475 | 14 | 49‍–‍35 | 28‍–‍50 |
| Oakland Athletics | 77 | 85 | .475 | 14 | 43‍–‍36 | 34‍–‍49 |
| Seattle Mariners | 74 | 88 | .457 | 17 | 42‍–‍41 | 32‍–‍47 |
| Texas Rangers | 62 | 99 | .385 | 28½ | 37‍–‍43 | 25‍–‍56 |

Locations of teams for the 1982–1988 American League seasons
West East

=== National League final standings ===
NL East
| Team | W | L | Pct. | GB | Home | Road |
|---|---|---|---|---|---|---|
| ^{(1)} St. Louis Cardinals | 101 | 61 | .623 | — | 54‍–‍27 | 47‍–‍34 |
| New York Mets | 98 | 64 | .605 | 3 | 51‍–‍30 | 47‍–‍34 |
| Montreal Expos | 84 | 77 | .522 | 16½ | 44‍–‍37 | 40‍–‍40 |
| Chicago Cubs | 77 | 84 | .478 | 23½ | 41‍–‍39 | 36‍–‍45 |
| Philadelphia Phillies | 75 | 87 | .463 | 26 | 41‍–‍40 | 34‍–‍47 |
| Pittsburgh Pirates | 57 | 104 | .354 | 43½ | 35‍–‍45 | 22‍–‍59 |

NL West
| Team | W | L | Pct. | GB | Home | Road |
|---|---|---|---|---|---|---|
| ^{(2)} Los Angeles Dodgers | 95 | 67 | .586 | — | 48‍–‍33 | 47‍–‍34 |
| Cincinnati Reds | 89 | 72 | .553 | 5½ | 47‍–‍34 | 42‍–‍38 |
| Houston Astros | 83 | 79 | .512 | 12 | 44‍–‍37 | 39‍–‍42 |
| San Diego Padres | 83 | 79 | .512 | 12 | 44‍–‍37 | 39‍–‍42 |
| Atlanta Braves | 66 | 96 | .407 | 29 | 32‍–‍49 | 34‍–‍47 |
| San Francisco Giants | 62 | 100 | .383 | 33 | 38‍–‍43 | 24‍–‍57 |

Locations of teams for the 1977–1992 National League seasons
West East

== Nippon Professional Baseball final standings ==
=== Central League final standings ===
Central League
| Team | G | W | L | T | Pct. | GB |
|---|---|---|---|---|---|---|
| Hanshin Tigers | 130 | 74 | 49 | 7 | .602 | -- |
| Hiroshima Toyo Carp | 130 | 68 | 57 | 5 | .544 | 7.0 |
| Yomiuri Giants | 130 | 61 | 60 | 9 | .504 | 12.0 |
| Yokohama Taiyo Whales | 130 | 57 | 61 | 12 | .483 | 14.5 |
| Chunichi Dragons | 130 | 56 | 61 | 13 | .479 | 15.0 |
| Yakult Swallows | 130 | 46 | 74 | 10 | .383 | 26.5 |

=== Pacific League final standings ===
Pacific League
| Team | G | W | L | T | Pct. | GB |
|---|---|---|---|---|---|---|
| Seibu Lions | 130 | 79 | 45 | 6 | .637 | -- |
| Lotte Orions | 130 | 64 | 60 | 6 | .516 | 15.0 |
| Kintetsu Buffaloes | 130 | 63 | 60 | 7 | .5121 | 15.5 |
| Hankyu Braves | 130 | 64 | 61 | 5 | .5120 | 15.5 |
| Nippon-Ham Fighters | 130 | 53 | 65 | 12 | .449 | 23.0 |
| Nankai Hawks | 130 | 44 | 76 | 10 | .367 | 33.0 |

== Events ==
=== January ===
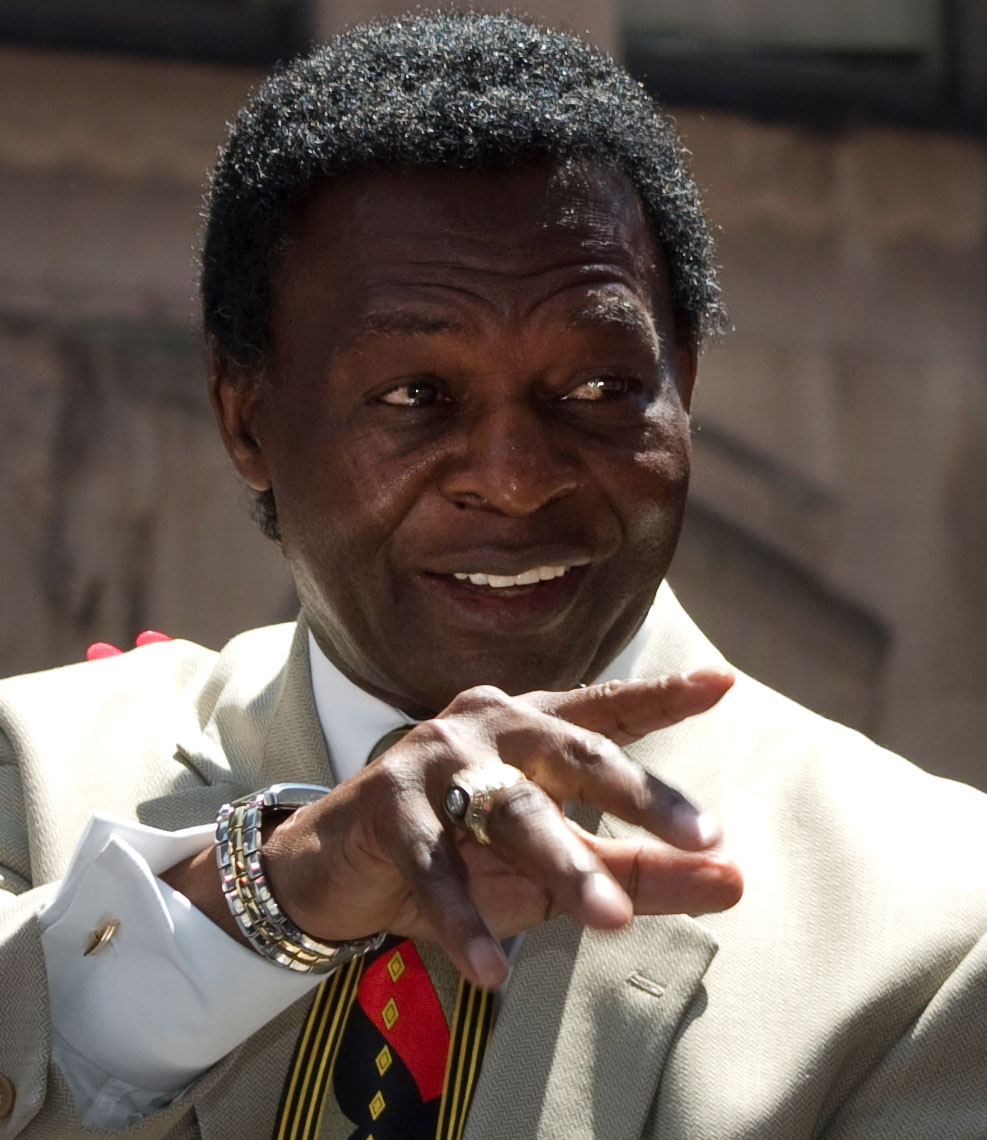
Lou Brock in 2008

- January 3:
  - Disappointed at the failures of their "also-ran" 1983 and 1984 teams, St. Louis Cardinals owner August A. Busch Jr. and his senior advisors fire general manager Joe McDonald. No successor is immediately named.
  - The January edition of the 1985 Major League Baseball draft—then held twice annually—yields future major leaguers Alex Cole, Chuck Finley and John Wetteland.
  - The defending National League champions, the San Diego Padres, sign veteran utility player Jerry Royster, granted free agency from the Atlanta Braves on November 8, 1984.
  - Rusty Staub agrees to return to the New York Mets for a final MLB season. Now a pinch-hitting specialist who only rarely appears in the field, Staub, 40, had been granted free agency from the Mets last November 12.
- January 7:
  - Outfielder Lou Brock and knuckleballer Hoyt Wilhelm are elected to the Hall of Fame by the Baseball Writers' Association of America, with Wilhelm becoming the first relief pitcher ever selected. Second baseman Nellie Fox is named on 295 of the 395 ballots (74.7%), but the BBWAA and the Hall of Fame committee decline to round Fox's percentage to the necessary 75%.
  - The Montreal Expos obtain infielder U. L. Washington from the Kansas City Royals for left-hander Mike Kinnunen and outfielder Kenny Baker.
- January 8:
  - The San Diego Padres sign veteran relief pitcher Tim Stoddard, granted free agency last November 8. Stoddard won ten games and saved seven others last year for the NL East-winning Chicago Cubs, and faced the Padres twice in the 1984 NLCS.
  - The New York Yankees purchase the contract of catcher Juan Espino from the Cleveland Indians.
- January 16 – The Seattle Mariners release their former slugging DH, Richie Zisk, ending his pro baseball career. The 35-year-old didn't play in 1984 after failing a physical examination because of a degenerative condition in his troublesome left knee.
- January 18 – Four teams—the Kansas City Royals, Milwaukee Brewers, New York Mets and Texas Rangers—combine for a blockbuster trade. In it, the Royals obtain six-time Gold Glove Award-winning catcher Jim Sundberg from Milwaukee, and the Brewers receive pitchers Tim Leary from the Mets and Danny Darwin from the Rangers. For their part, the Royals send pitcher Frank Wills to the Mets, and catcher Don Slaught to the Rangers. Milwaukee also gains a minor-league catcher, Bill Hance, from Texas as a "player to be named later (PTBNL)."
- January 24 – The fourth and final "Type-A Free-Agent Compensation Draft", implemented after the 1981 Major League Baseball strike, results in the selection of two important relief pitchers and one shortstop from a pool of eligible players made available by clubs who "opt in" to Type-A free agency.
  - The Toronto Blue Jays select fireballing reliever Tom Henke from the Rangers as compensation for the loss of DH Cliff Johnson. Henke, 27, will help pitch Toronto to the AL East championship and win two contests in the 1985 ALCS.
  - The California Angels obtain veteran right-hander Donnie Moore from the Atlanta Braves as compensation for the Baltimore Orioles' signing of two ex-Angels, Don Aase and Fred Lynn. This coming season, Moore, 30, will win eight games, save 31, make the AL All-Star team, and help his club contend for its division title.
  - A premier relief pitcher is also involved, indirectly, in the St. Louis Cardinals' selection of shortstop Ángel Salazar. The 23-year-old Salazar, who appeared in 57 games for the 1984 Montreal Expos, is plucked from the player pool as payment for St. Louis' loss of future Hall-of-Fame closer Bruce Sutter, signed in December by the Braves.
- January 26 – The San Francisco Giants trade veteran left-handed reliever Gary Lavelle to the Toronto Blue Jays for right-handed starter/reliever Jim Gott and two minor-leaguers, pitcher Jack McKnight and shortstop Augie Schmidt. Lavelle, 36, has won 73 games and saved 127 in his 11 seasons with the Giants.
- January 30 – The California Angels sign veteran outfielder Ruppert Jones, granted free agency from the world-champion Detroit Tigers last November 8.

=== February ===
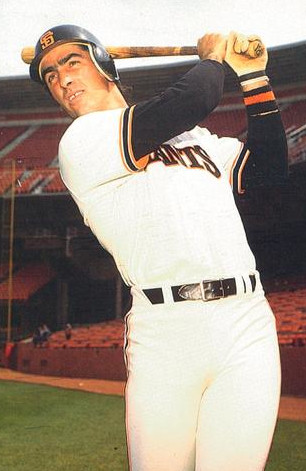
Jack Clark in 1983

- February 1:
  - In one of the off-season's most impactful transactions, the San Francisco Giants trade slugging outfielder Jack Clark to the St. Louis Cardinals for pitcher Dave LaPoint, shortstop José Uribe, and outfielders David Green and Gary Rajsich. Clark, 29, is a two-time NL All-Star who has bashed 163 home runs in a Giant uniform; hampered by a knee injury, he had played only 57 games in 1984. His power-hitting will help St. Louis win National League pennants this season and in 1987. Field manager Whitey Herzog, temporarily operating without a general manager, works with the Cardinals' high-level executive committee to complete the trade.
  - Basking in unprecedented popularity after their triumphant 1984 campaign, the Detroit Tigers cut off further season-ticket sales after hitting the 9,000 mark. "We think we've reached the saturation point," says a team executive. The team sets aside enough unsold box and reserved-seat tickets to accommodate single-game sales.
- February 4 – Still a .300 hitter at age 38, Al Oliver is sent to his sixth major-league address when the Philadelphia Phillies deal him to the Los Angeles Dodgers for pitcher Pat Zachry. He'll finish his farewell season with his seventh MLB team, going three for eight in the 1985 ALCS as a member of the Toronto Blue Jays. His 18 years in MLB see Oliver bat .303 lifetime, and collect 2,743 hits, seven All-Star selections, a World Series ring, and the 1982 NL batting title.
- February 16 – The San Diego Padres sign future Hall-of-Fame second baseman and 12-time All-Star Roberto Alomar, of Salinas, Puerto Rico, as an international amateur free agent. The son and brother of major-leaguers, Roberto will begin his pro career this season at age 17 in the Class A South Atlantic League.
- February 19 – The Minnesota Twins reacquire Roy Smalley, obtaining him from the Chicago White Sox for designated hitter Randy Johnson and minor-league outfielder Ron Scheer. The switch-hitting Smalley, now 32, was Minnesota's starting shortstop from mid-1976 through 1981; he'll transition from the infield to DH this season and will ultimately win a 1987 World Series ring in his second stint in the Twin Cities.
- February 25 – The St. Louis Cardinals name Dal Maxvill, who appeared in three World Series between 1964 and 1968 as their starting shortstop or second baseman, to fill their weeks-long void as general manager. A native of the St. Louis suburbs who holds a degree in electrical engineering from Washington University in St. Louis, Maxvill, now 46, most recently was a coach on Joe Torre's staff with the New York Mets and Atlanta Braves.
- February 27 – The Texas Rangers reacquire former three-time All-Star shortstop Toby Harrah from the New York Yankees in exchange for outfielder Billy Sample and a PTBNL. Harrah, 36, now a second baseman, is one of 1972's original Rangers, arriving with the franchise from Washington. He was traded to the Cleveland Indians for Buddy Bell in December 1978.
- February 28 – The Pittsburgh Pirates sign right-hander Rick Reuschel, granted free agency from the Chicago Cubs last November 8. Reuschel, 35, will be one of the few bright spots on a 104-loss team, posting a 14–8 (2.27) record with nine complete games in 31 mound appearances in 1985.

=== March ===
- March 6 – Outfielder Enos Slaughter, 68, and late shortstop Arky Vaughan, who drowned in a boating accident at age 40 in 1952, are elected to the Baseball Hall of Fame by the Special Veterans Committee.
- March 7 – Phil Seghi, 75, general manager of the Cleveland Indians since January 1973, steps down in favor of former Texas Rangers GM Joe Klein, 42, who is named vice president, baseball operations.
- March 18 – Commissioner Peter Ueberroth officially reinstates Hall of Famers Mickey Mantle and Willie Mays. The two had been banned from working within Major League Baseball by Ueberroth's predecessor, Bowie Kuhn, due to their associations with gambling casinos.
- March 23 – Designated hitter Oscar Gamble returns to the Chicago White Sox after a seven-year absence. Gamble, now 35, hit 31 homers for the slugging 1977 ChiSox. He had been granted free agency from the New York Yankees last November 8.
- March 28 – The April Fools' Day issue of Sports Illustrated—which features George Plimpton's hoax article on fictional baseball phenom Sidd Finch—hits the newsstands.

=== April ===
- April 1:
  - The Cleveland Indians trade right-hander Jay Baller to the Chicago Cubs for infielder Dan Rohn.
  - The Philadelphia Phillies send first baseman Len Matuszek to the Toronto Blue Jays for pitcher Dave Shipanoff, infielder José Escobar and outfielder Ken Kinnard.
- April 2 – The New York Mets and St. Louis Cardinals, destined to battle for NL East supremacy this season, make a four-player trade. In it, the Mets deal infielder José Oquendo, 21, and minor-league hurler Mark Davis to the Redbirds for infielder Ángel Salazar, 23, and minor-league pitcher John Young.
- April 3 – The Cleveland Indians sign minor-league free-agent relief pitcher Doug Jones. The 27-year-old Jones, entering his eighth year in professional baseball, has been given only a single four-game MLB trial by the Milwaukee Brewers in 1982. Sent to the minors for all of 1985 and parts of 1986 and 1987, he works on his off-speed pitches and, when he makes the Indians' varsity for good at age 30 on July 1, 1987, Jones—nicknamed "The Sultan of Slow"—will become one of MLB's top relievers, making four All-Star teams (two in each league) and saving over 300 games before he retires at 43 in September 2000.
- April 6:
  - The San Francisco Giants sign free-agent left-hander Vida Blue. The 35-year-old, 191-game winner was released by the Kansas City Royals in August 1983, then suspended by then-Commissioner Bowie Kuhn for the entire 1984 season after pleading guilty to a charge of cocaine possession. Invited by the Giants to this spring's training camp, Blue has impressed with three strong outings against Cactus League competition.
  - The Texas Rangers "return" 20-year-old Rule 5 draft pick Mitch Williams to his original team, the San Diego Padres, then immediately reacquire him from San Diego for third baseman Randy Asadoor. The trade enables the Rangers to retain the MLB rights to Williams—soon to be nicknamed "The Wild Thing"—and option the flame-throwing southpaw to the minors for "seasoning" in 1985. Williams graduates to the Ranger varsity in 1986 to kick off a memorable 11-year big league career as a left-handed reliever.
  - Relief pitchers also figure in today's trade between the St. Louis Cardinals and Philadelphia Phillies. St. Louis wheels left-handed set-up man Dave Rucker to the Phils for right-hander Bill Campbell and infielder Iván DeJesús.

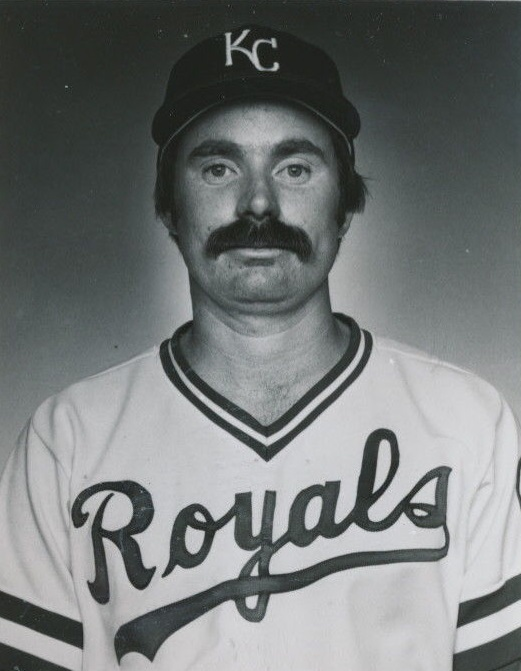
Dan Quisenberry

- April 8:
  - Five games are played on Opening Day in Major League Baseball, four of them in the American League and one in the National League.
    - The NL's traditional opener in Cincinnati sees the Reds' Mario Soto out-pitch Steve Rogers of the Montreal Expos, allowing only four hits over seven innings in a 4–1 victory. Cincinnati player–manager Pete Rose, six days shy of his 44th birthday and in his 23rd MLB season, gets the game-winning hit, a two-RBI fifth-inning double that breaks a scoreless tie.
    - At Royals Stadium, host Kansas City defeats the Toronto Blue Jays, 2–1, in what will be a preview of the 1985 American League Championship Series. Lefty Bud Black has a similar line to Soto's, allowing just four hits in 72/3 innings before he turns the game over to three-time All-Star closer Dan Quisenberry, whose 45 saves will lead the AL for the fourth consecutive year in 1985.
  - The Pittsburgh Pirates sign 12-year veteran shortstop Bill Almon, granted free agency from the Oakland Athletics last November 8.
- April 11 – At the Kingdome, Gorman Thomas hits three home runs and drives in six runs to lead the Seattle Mariners to a 14–6 victory over the Oakland Athletics. The game features nine homers, seven by the Mariners.
- April 17 – The San Francisco Giants acquire catcher Alex Treviño from the Atlanta Braves for outfielder/catcher John Rabb.
- April 20 – The Pittsburgh Pirates trade veteran reliever Kent Tekulve, 38, to the Philadelphia Phillies for left-handed relief ace Al Holland and minor-league southpaw Frankie Griffin. Tekulve has appeared in 722 games for the Pirates since his debut on May 20, 1974.
- April 23 – The Oakland Athletics (four) and California Angels (six, including two from Reggie Jackson) combine for ten home runs in a night game at Anaheim Stadium; despite being out-slugged, the Athletics prevail 14–9. All six Angel long-balls are solo shots.
- April 26:
  - Facing the minimum of 27 batters, pitcher Orel Hershiser of the Los Angeles Dodgers, on the cusp of breakthrough stardom, fires his first one-hitter of 1985, defeating the visiting San Diego Padres, 2–0. Future Hall-of-Famer Tony Gwynn is the Padres' only baserunner, reaching on a base on balls in the first and a single in the fourth—but he's erased on a pickoff and a conventional caught-stealing, respectively.
  - No no-hitters will be thrown in MLB in 1985, but there will be 14 one-hitters, including a second complete-game effort by Hershiser on July 23 against the Pittsburgh Pirates.
- April 28:
  - At Shea Stadium, the New York Mets and Pittsburgh Pirates battle for 18 innings until the Mets push over an unearned run in the home half of the 18th for a 5–4 triumph. New York reliever Tom Gorman hurls seven shutout innings and gains the win.
  - Only 16 games into the season, and hours after being swept by the Chicago White Sox in a three-game series at Comiskey Park, the New York Yankees (6–10, tied for sixth in the AL East, 4½ games from first place) fire manager Yogi Berra. George Steinbrenner does not fire Berra personally; instead, he dispatches general manager Clyde King to deliver the news. Berra vows after the slight to never again set foot in Yankee Stadium as long as Steinbrenner owns the team. Billy Martin, whom Berra replaced as manager after the 1983 season, begins the fourth of his five terms as Yankee skipper.
- April 30 – The Philadelphia Phillies' Jerry Koosman hurls a complete game, 11-hit shutout to defeat the Montreal Expos, 11–0, at Veterans Stadium. All of the Expo hits are singles.

=== May ===
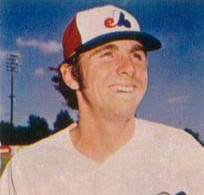
Steve Rogers in 1977

- May 3 – The San Francisco Giants sign free-agent outfielder Ron Roenicke, released by the San Diego Padres March 30.
- May 4 – The San Diego Padres suspend second baseman Alan Wiggins for a year following a cocaine-addiction relapse. The suspension will be lifted when he's traded to the Baltimore Orioles for pitcher Roy Lee Jackson and a "PTBNL" on June 27. Wiggins is one of at least four MLB players who have been in the news thus far in 1985 for drug-related arrests or suspensions. The baseball year will be marked by a federal grand jury inquiry into drug-trafficking and a high-profile criminal trial in Pittsburgh in September, in which at least six active MLB players will testify under immunity.
- May 12 – At Montréal, the Expos' mound staff throws its fourth consecutive shutout, as David Palmer and closer Jeff Reardon combine to blank the Atlanta Braves on six hits, 4–0. The Braves fail to score a run in the three-game series sweep, falling to Bryn Smith's and Bill Gullickson's complete games the previous two contests. The Expos' scoreless-innings skein, which began May 7 in a 3–1 home loss to the Houston Astros, will reach an MLB-high 421/3 before it's halted by Houston on May 13 in the third inning at the Astrodome.
- May 13 – Against the Philadelphia Phillies at Riverfront Stadium, Tony Pérez of the Cincinnati Reds becomes the oldest player to hit a grand slam. The shot comes in the sixth inning off Dave Rucker with Dave Concepción, Ron Oester and Dave Van Gorder on base and breaks a 3–3 tie; the Reds win by that 7–3 score. Pérez, who will celebrate his 43rd birthday tomorrow, breaks Honus Wagner's 70-year record as the oldest player to hit a slam; Wagner had done so on July 29, 1915, at 41 years, five months. Perez' record will be broken 20 years later by 46-year old Julio Franco.
- May 16 – The managerial career of Bobby Valentine begins when he replaces Doug Rader at the wheel of the Texas Rangers (9–23, last in the AL West, and enduring their third losing streak of five or more games of the young season). Valentine, 35, has yet to manage in the majors, minors or in Japan; he's just begun his second campaign as third-base coach of the New York Mets.
- May 17:
  - The St. Louis Cardinals send former NL All-Star Lonnie Smith across Missouri to the Kansas City Royals for prospect and fellow outfielder John Morris. Smith will start all seven games against his old teammates, and collect nine hits, three bases on balls and two stolen bases, in the 1985 World Series. He will also draw unwanted attention when Smith, whose use of cocaine was reported in June 1983, testifies in September's Pittsburgh drug trials.
  - The Rangers sign free agent catcher/third baseman Geno Petralli, released by the Cleveland Indians April 23. Two days later, on May 19, they sign veteran minor-league relief pitcher Dale Mohorcic as a free agent. Petralli, 25, has appeared in only 25 MLB games for the Toronto Blue Jays, and Mohorcic, 29, has never pitched above Triple-A in seven pro seasons; however, the pair will play over 950 games for the Rangers in the years to come.
- May 18 – The Royals release 37-year-old left-hander Larry Gura, who has won 111 games since joining them in May 1976. Later this month, Gura will hook up with the Chicago Cubs, his original MLB team, to finish his career.
- May 20 – Pete Rose, the Cincinnati Reds' 44-year old player-manager, hits his first home run since 1982 in a 6–1 loss to the Chicago Cubs. Rose will later hit his final career homer September 6 in a 7–5 win, also against the Cubs.
- May 21 – The Montreal Expos release veteran right-hander Steve Rogers, 35, ace of their pitching staff since his MLB debut in July 1973. The five-time NL All-Star posted a 158–152 (3.17) record for the Expos over his 13-season, 399-game career, twice leading his league in shutouts and once in ERA (2.40 in 1982). The California Angels and, later in 1985, the Chicago White Sox, will sign Rogers as a free agent, but he will not appear in an MLB contest for either team.
- May 23 – The struggling Pittsburgh Pirates, 12–25 and 11½ games out of the NL East lead, fire general manager Harding "Pete" Peterson, and appoint Peterson's predecessor, Joe L. Brown, interim GM. Former Buc catcher Peterson, 55, has been the club's baseball operations chief since October 1976, when Brown, now 66, retired.
- May 30 – Shortstop Johnnie LeMaster, who spent the first 886 games of his MLB career with one team (the San Francisco Giants) is traded for the second time in 23 days when the Cleveland Indians ship him to the Pittsburgh Pirates for a PTBNL (pitcher Scott Bailes). On May 7, the Giants had dealt LeMaster, 30, to Cleveland for pitcher Mike Jeffcoat and infielder Luis Quiñones.

=== June ===
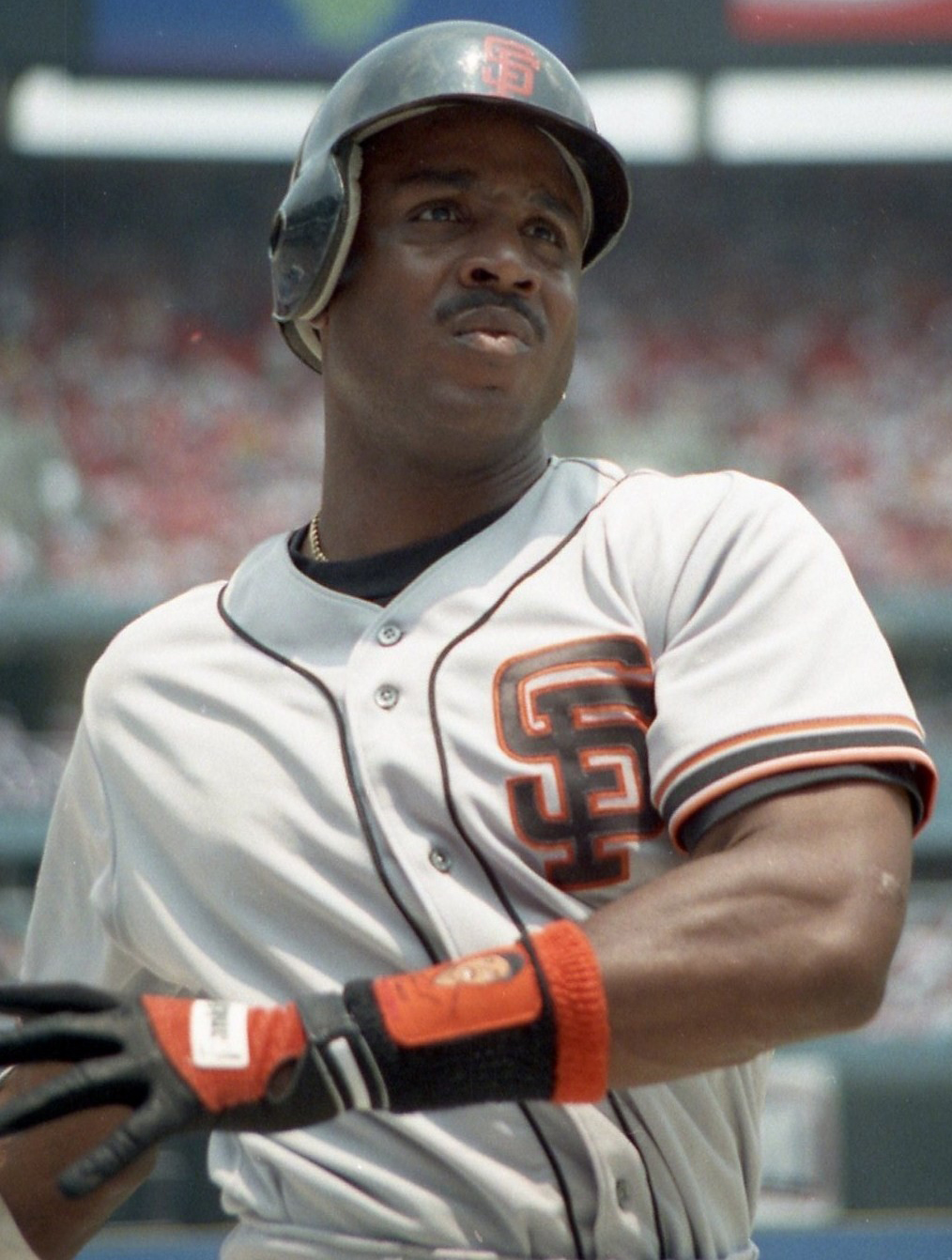
Barry Bonds (1993)

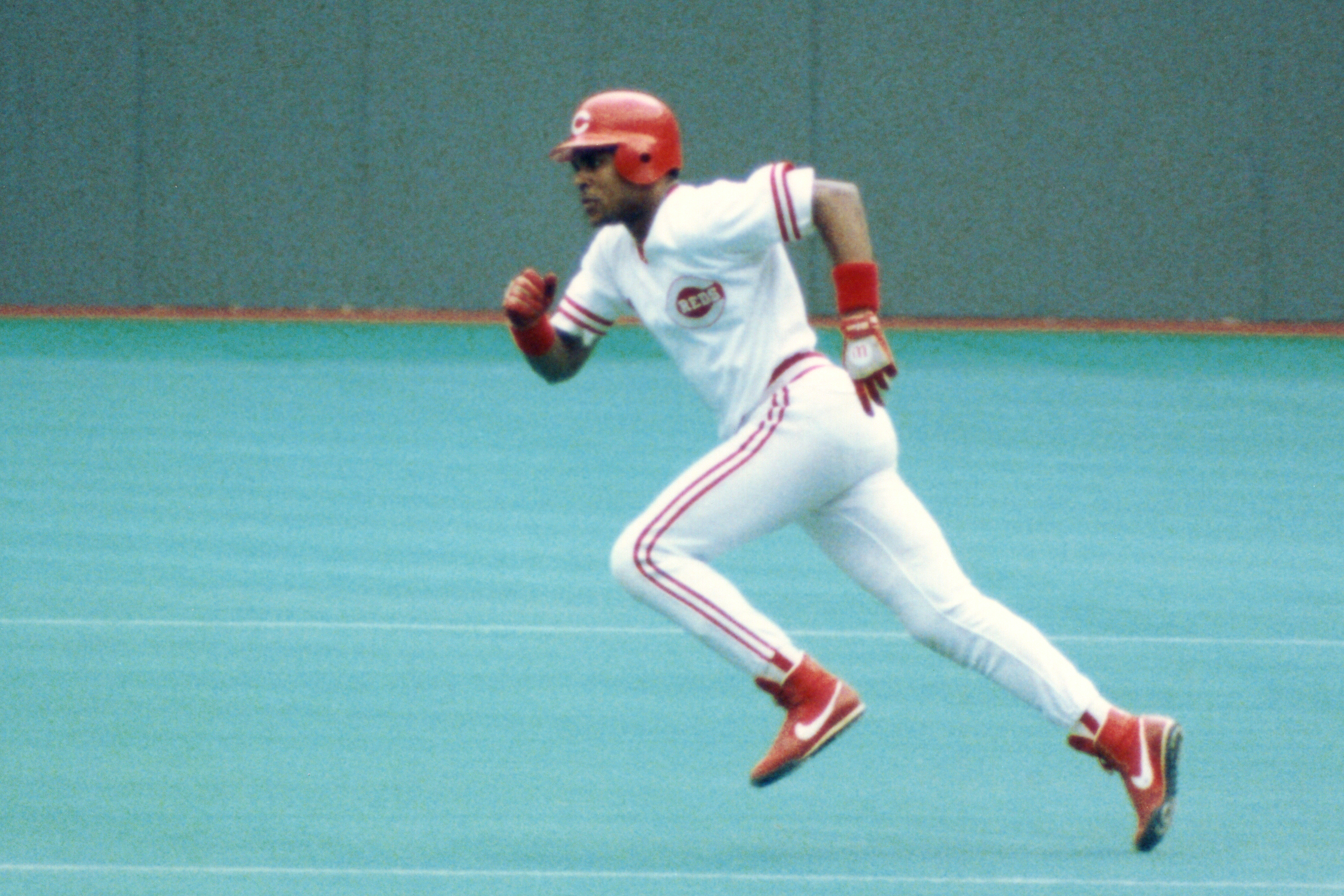
Barry Larkin (1990)

- June 3 – The star-studded June 1985 MLB amateur draft launches the professional baseball careers of Barry Bonds, Barry Larkin, Will Clark, Rafael Palmeiro, Randy Johnson, and others who will dominate sports headlines for the next two decades. Standout UNC–Chapel Hill catcher B. J. Surhoff is the first overall selection by the Milwaukee Brewers.
- June 5 – At Jack Murphy Stadium, John Denny of the Philadelphia Phillies and Tim Flannery of the San Diego Padres come to blows an inning after Denny cracks Flannery's batting helmet with a pitch. The fight occurs when Flannery, sliding into third base after hitting a go-ahead single, yells at Denny, who's backing up the play. As the benches empty, Denny's 6 ft 5 in (1.96 m) teammate Kevin Gross picks up the 5 ft 11 in (1.80 m) Flannery and throws him to the ground. The two Phillies are ejected, Flannery stays in the game, and the Padres win, 6–5.
- June 6 – In a key AL East match-up at Exhibition Stadium, Toronto Blue Jays southpaw Jimmy Key and the Detroit Tigers' Dan Petry lock up in a suspenseful pitchers' duel. Detroit's Tom Brookens breaks up Key's no-hitter with a ninth-inning single, then the scoreless contest reaches extra innings. It remains 0–0 until the home half of the 12th, when Jays' catcher Buck Martinez smashes a game-winning homer off Aurelio López with George Bell on base, to give Toronto a 2–0 win.
- June 11 – In a 26–7 romp over the New York Mets, Von Hayes of the Philadelphia Phillies becomes the first player in MLB history to hit two home runs in the first inning of a game. Hayes leads off the contest with a homer, then hits a grand slam later in the frame. His are the only two home runs hit in the high-scoring affair, in which the Phils set the year's standard for runs scored, doubles (ten), and RBIs (all 26) by a team.
- June 13 – Mired in a five-game losing streak—and already eight games behind division-leading Toronto—the Baltimore Orioles fire manager Joe Altobelli and bring franchise icon Earl Weaver out of retirement to take command. Altobelli's 1983 Orioles won the team's third World Series, but his record since is 114–103. Future Hall-of-Famer Weaver, 54, won 1,250 of 2,100 regular season games, four pennants and one World Series in his 14½ years as the O's pilot before retiring in 1982. Coach Cal Ripken Sr. will handle the team today (an 8–3 victory over the Milwaukee Brewers at Memorial Stadium), with Weaver to take the helm tomorrow, June 14.
- June 16 – Earl Weaver's Orioles win their third straight game (fourth overall), as Wayne Gross slugs a pair of solo home runs, part of a five-homer barrage, and they rout the Brewers, 9–1, behind Mike Boddicker. However, the Os will drop eight of their next ten games—including seven losses in a row to the New York Yankees—and hover near the .500 mark through mid-August.
- June 20 – The Detroit Tigers acquire left-hander Frank Tanana from the Texas Rangers for minor-league pitching prospect Duane James. Tanana, 31, is a Detroit native now in his 13th MLB season; he'll win 96 games for the Tigers over the next eight seasons.
- June 21 – The 27–35 Minnesota Twins, losers of 18 of their last 24 games, replace fifth-year manager Billy Gardner with Ray Miller, 40, the Orioles' highly regarded pitching coach.
- June 22 – MLB's Canadian franchises make a rare trade, with the Toronto Blue Jays sending outfielder Mitch Webster to the Montreal Expos for a "PTBNL", left-hander Cliff Young, who is added to the deal September 10.
- June 27 – Jeffrey Leonard hits for the cycle in the San Francisco Giants' 7–6 loss to the Cincinnati Reds at Riverfront Stadium. Leonard's is the first of four "cycles" to happen in the majors this season.

=== July ===
- July 1 – After almost two full years as interim CEO/president of the Cincinnati Reds, Bob Howsam retires. One of the principal architects of the 1970s' "Big Red Machine," Howsam, 67, has helped revitalize the franchise during his second tour of duty as its front-office boss. With Pete Rose in command as player-manager, veteran former free-agent Dave Parker returning to All-Star and MVP-candidate form, and young players like Eric Davis maturing into stardom, the 1985 Reds will win 89 games—after three terrible seasons during which they averaged only 68 victories.
- July 2 – Pitcher Joe Niekro of the Houston Astros wins his 200th career game, 3–2 over the San Diego Padres. Joe and Phil Niekro join Jim Perry and Gaylord Perry as the only pitching brother combinations to each win at least 200 games.
- July 4 – The Los Angeles Dodgers sever ties with left-hander Steve Howe after the 1979 NL Rookie of the Year and former All-Star, known for struggling with cocaine addiction, reports late or fails to show up for games. Howe, 27, will sign with the Minnesota Twins as a free agent August 12.
- July 4–5 – In a holiday night game twice delayed by rain at Atlanta–Fulton County Stadium, the New York Mets outlast the Atlanta Braves 16–13 in a 19-inning contest that features Keith Hernandez hitting for the cycle, Mets slugger Darryl Strawberry and manager Davey Johnson being ejected, 28 hits by the visitors, and the Braves coming back to tie the game twice in extra innings—most notably in the bottom of the 18th. Pitcher Rick Camp, a career .074 hitter batting only because the Braves have no position players left, hits a solo home run in the 18th to re-tie the game at 11. In his next at bat an inning later, Camp fans to end the game after six hours and ten minutes. Even though the date/time is July 5 and 3:15 a.m., the Braves shoot off their scheduled Fourth of July post-game fireworks for fans who endure to the end.
- July 7 – Just three days after the Mets–Braves' marathon, the visiting Montreal Expos and Houston Astros struggle for 19 innings before Montreal emerges victorious, 6–3. Each team had scored a run in the 18th to preserve the tie before the Expos tally three times in the final frame for the win. The two 19-inning contests are MLB's longest extra inning games of the year.
- July 11 – The Houston Astros' Nolan Ryan becomes the first pitcher to record 4,000 strikeouts, fanning Danny Heep in the sixth inning of Houston's 4–3 win over the New York Mets.
- July 12 – The Oakland Athletics sign free-agent lefty Tommy John, 42, who had been released by the California Angels on June 19.

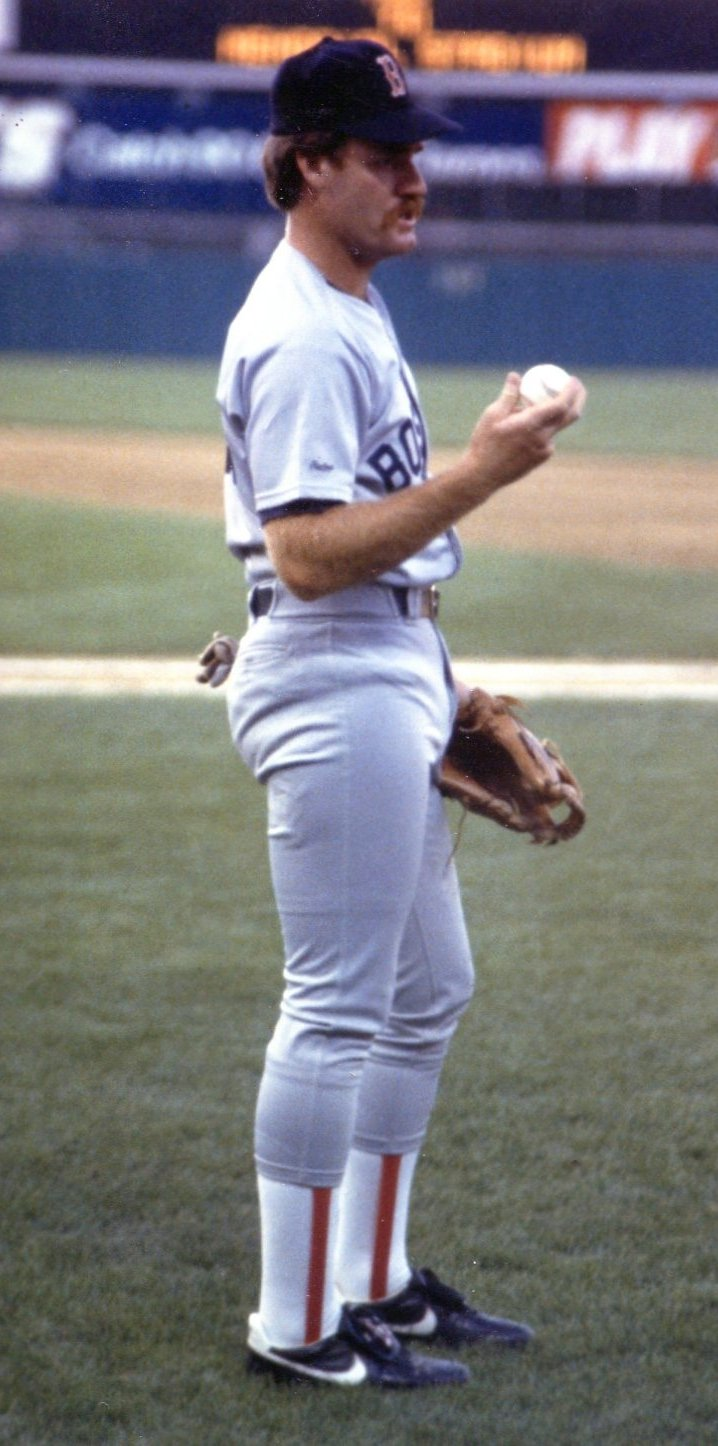
Wade Boggs in 1988

- July 15:
  - The 1985 All-Star Game break sees three tight divisional races. In the NL West, the Los Angeles Dodgers (48–37) boast a half-game edge over the San Diego Padres (49–39); in the NL East, the St. Louis Cardinals (52–33) are 2½ games in front of the Mets (50–36); and in the AL East, the Toronto Blue Jays (53–35) hold the same 2½-game margin over the New York Yankees (49–36 and resurgent under Billy Martin). Only the AL West has a clear front-runner: the California Angels (52–35), six lengths ahead of the Oakland Athletics (46–41) and 7½ ahead of the third-place Kansas City Royals (44–42).
  - Dave Parker wins the first annual All-Star Home Run Derby.
- July 16 – The National League beats the American League 6–1 at Minnesota's Metrodome for its 13th win in the last 14 All-Star Games. The San Diego Padres' LaMarr Hoyt allows one unearned run in three innings and is named MVP.
- July 19:
  - Third baseman Buddy Bell, a five-time AL All-Star and Gold Glove Award winner, returns to his hometown when he's traded by the Texas Rangers to the Cincinnati Reds for outfielder Duane Walker and a "PTBNL", pitcher Jeff Russell, added to the trade on July 23. Bell, 34, is the son of the Reds' star centerfielder of the 1950s.
  - Andy MacPhail, former assistant general manager of the Houston Astros, is named vice president, player personnel, of the Minnesota Twins. One month later, Twins owner Carl Pohlad will give MacPhail full general manager responsibilities, making the 32 year old—whose father and grandfather will both be enshrined in the Hall of Fame as executives—the youngest GM in the major leagues.
- July 20:
  - Los Angeles strikes for three early runs and Fernando Valenzuela fires a complete-game shutout, besting John Tudor and the St. Louis Cardinals, 3–0, at Dodger Stadium. The loss breaks Tudor's personal winning streak at nine in a row; the Redbird southpaw won't lose another game until Game 1 of the 1985 NLCS.
  - Darryl Strawberry collects seven RBIs in the New York Mets' 16–4 victory over the Atlanta Braves at Shea Stadium.
- July 23 – At Arlington Stadium, rookie Oddibe McDowell becomes the first Texas Ranger to hit for the cycle as the Rangers defeat the Cleveland Indians 8–4.
- July 25 – En route to the second of his five American League batting crowns, future Hall-of-Famer Wade Boggs of the Boston Red Sox extends his hitting streak to 28 consecutive games, most in the majors in 1985, with his first-inning single off Bill Swift of the Seattle Mariners at Fenway Park. Boggs' skein, which began June 24, will be halted by Seattle's Jim Beattie and Frank Wills tomorrow, July 26.

=== August ===
- August 1 – Future Hall-of-Famer Bert Blyleven returns to the Minnesota Twins when the 34-year-old right-hander is acquired from the Cleveland Indians for four players: pitchers Curt Wardle and Rich Yett ("PTBNL"), shortstop Jay Bell and outfielder Jim Weaver. Blyleven won 99 games for the Twins from June 5, 1970 (at age 19) until, approaching free agency, he was traded on June 1, 1976.
- August 2 – The California Angels (57–44), currently leaders in the AL West, pick up three veterans of the struggling Pittsburgh Pirates for the stretch drive—southpaws John Candelaria and Al Holland and outfielder George Hendrick—for three young players: left-handers Pat Clements and Bob Kipper (PTBNL) and outfielder Mike Brown.
- August 4:
  - The New York Yankees celebrate "Phil Rizzuto Day" at Yankee Stadium, and retire #10 in Rizzuto's honor. In the game that follows, Tom Seaver of the Chicago White Sox records his 300th career win, a 145-pitch, complete-game 4–1 victory—defying Rizzuto's prediction that the Bombers would deny him that milestone.
  - Rod Carew of the California Angels gets his 3,000th career hit: a double off the Minnesota Twins' Frank Viola.
- August 5 – Darryl Strawberry blasts three home runs, helping the New York Mets beat the Chicago Cubs 7–2.
- August 6–7 – All parks go dark for a brief strike. Twenty-three of the 25 missed games will be made up before the season ends. A new CBA, announced on August 7, frees November free agents to sign with any MLB team (instead of via a draft system) and abolishes both the Type-A free agent compensation provision and the old December 15 inter-league trading deadline; it sets July 31 as the most important annual trade deadline. Minimum salary is raised from $40,000 to $60,000, and there is no salary cap.
- August 8 – The Cincinnati Reds obtain catcher Bo Díaz from the Philadelphia Phillies, along with minor-leaguer Greg Simpson, for pitcher Freddie Toliver (PTBNL), catcher Alan Knicely and infielder Tom Foley.
- August 10 – Dave Kingman becomes the 21st player in Major League Baseball history to hit 400 home runs with his two-run, first-inning blast that helps his Oakland Athletics defeat the Seattle Mariners, 11–5, at the Kingdome. Kingman has been stuck on 399 since he belted his last round-tripper on July 24 at Fenway Park.
- August 11 – After giving up only one run to the New York Yankees in five innings today at Fenway Park, sophomore fireballer Roger Clemens is shut down by the Boston Red Sox for the remainder of the 1985 campaign with a sore shoulder. Clemens, 23, has made just 15 starts this season; he's posted a 7–5 (3.29) record, with only 74 strikeouts in 981/3 innings pitched. He will undergo arthroscopic surgery on August 30 under the supervision of Dr. James Andrews, and after rehabbing the injury, he'll be ready for spring training in 1986.
- August 15 – Cal Ripken hits his 100th career home run helping the Baltimore Orioles beat the Texas Rangers, 9–1.

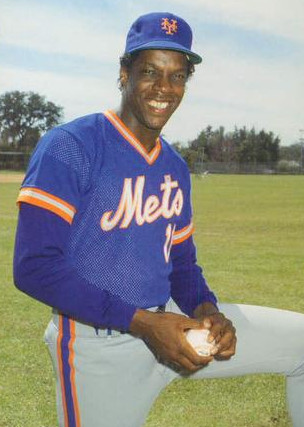
Dwight Gooden

- August 20 – Dwight Gooden strikes out a season high 16 in a 3–0, complete-game victory over the San Francisco Giants.
- August 25 – With his 9–3 triumph over the San Diego Padres, Gooden becomes the first New York Mets twenty-game winner since Jerry Koosman in 1976. It's his 17th victory in a row.
- August 26:
  - The Atlanta Braves dismiss first-year manager Eddie Haas and name third-base coach Bobby Wine to replace him on an interim basis. The Braves have lost 12 of their last 13 games; at 50–71, they sit 22 games behind the first-place Los Angeles Dodgers in the NL West.
  - Eddie Murray of the Baltimore Orioles blasts three homers and drives in nine in a 17–3 shellacking of the California Angels at Anaheim Stadium. Murray's nine RBIs are the most in a game in MLB this season.
- August 28 – The Toronto Blue Jays reacquire designated hitter Cliff Johnson, 38, from the Texas Rangers for three young pitchers: Greg Ferlenda (a PTBNL), Jeff Mays and Matt Williams. It's Johnson's second stint as a Blue Jay; last November 8, he had been granted free agency after spending both 1983 and 1984 as Toronto's primary DH.
- August 29 – The St. Louis Cardinals pick up 16-year veteran César Cedeño from the Cincinnati Reds for minor-league outfield prospect Mike Jackson. Cedeño, 34, is a four-time All-Star and 5x Gold Glove Award winner now playing left field for Cincinnati. In St. Louis, he will temporarily fill the void left by slugger Jack Clark, sidelined by a rib injury. Cedeño starts 23 games at first base between August 31 and October 1; he bats a torrid .434 (33-for-76) with six home runs to help the Cardinals capture the NL East, then starts five games in right field in the 1985 World Series.
- August 30 – The Los Angeles Dodgers acquire four-time NL batting champion and 3x All-Star Bill Madlock, 34, from the Pittsburgh Pirates for three players to be named later: first baseman Sid Bream and outfielders Cecil Espy and R. J. Reynolds. Madlock almost immediately takes over the Dodgers' third-base job; he bats .360 (41-for-114) for the rest of the regular season, and .333 (eight-for-24) with three homers in the six-game 1985 NLCS.

=== September ===
- September 2 – The conclusion of Labor Day action reveals two tight divisional races in the major leagues. The New York Mets (78–52) now trail the St. Louis Cardinals (78–50) by one full game (two in the loss column) in the NL East, after New York defeats San Diego, 12–4, and St. Louis falls to Cincinnati, 4–1. In the AL West, the California Angels (74–57) maintain a 2½-game edge over the Kansas City Royals (70–58) when each team triumphs today. The Los Angeles Dodgers (6½ games) and Toronto Blue Jays (four lengths) enjoy more substantial division leads.
- September 3 – At Tiger Stadium, Reggie Jackson of the Angels becomes the first player to hit 100 home runs for three different teams. He hits the milestone home run off Detroit Tiger Bob Stoddard in the ninth inning of the Angels' 14–8 loss; he had homered off Dan Petry earlier in the game, in the fourth inning. Jackson had hit 269 home runs with the Kansas City/Oakland Athletics and 144 with the New York Yankees.
- September 5 – Cocaine and other illegal drug use among baseball players make headlines again when Kansas City Royals outfielder Lonnie Smith, granted immunity from prosecution, testifies in the Pittsburgh cocaine-trafficking trial of a Philadelphia caterer. Smith is the first of seven active or retired players to testify in the criminal case. Commissioner of Baseball Peter Ueberroth will hand down suspensions to 11 players in February 1986.

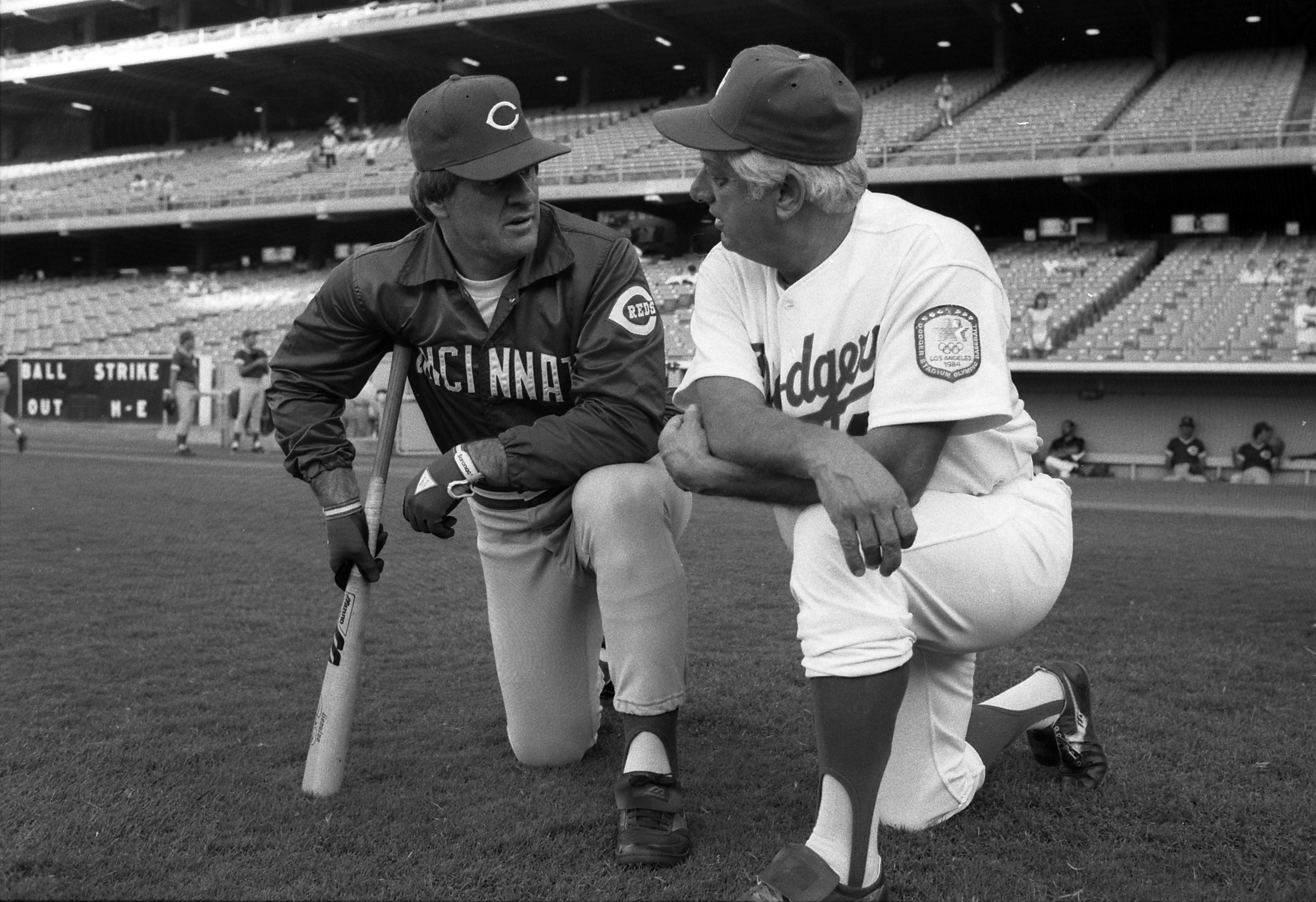
Pete Rose, left, with Tom Lasorda (1985)

- September 8 – At Wrigley Field, Pete Rose inserts himself into the Cincinnati Reds' lineup as a late addition, and picks up two singles, the second of which gives him 4,191 hits in his career, tying him with Ty Cobb for the career record. The game is eventually called because of darkness after nine innings, resulting in a rare 5–5 tie.
- September 11 – In the first inning at Riverfront Stadium today, Eric Show of the San Diego Padres goes down in history for surrendering Pete Rose's historic 4,192nd career hit: a line drive single to center field. It breaks the tie for the career record which Rose had shared with Ty Cobb since September 8. In the game, Rose's Cincinnati Reds shut out San Diego, 2–0. Tom Browning allows five singles in 81/3, and John Franco and Ted Power close it out.
- September 12 – After frittering away a 6–0, second-inning lead, the New York Mets watch the St. Louis Cardinals tie the game in the ninth inning on a ninth-inning Willie McGee home run—before ex-Cardinal Keith Hernandez' RBI single delivers a 7–6 New York victory in the bottom half of the final regulation frame. The victory enables the Mets to claim two of three games in the Shea Stadium showdown and take a one-game lead in the NL East. The Cardinals' loss is their fifth in their last six games.
- September 13 – The Houston Astros fire general manager Al Rosen and replace him with former Cincinnati Reds front-office boss Dick Wagner. Rosen, 61, star third baseman of the early 1950s Cleveland Indians, succeeded Tal Smith as Houston's GM in November 1980 in one of owner John McMullen's most controversial moves. Wagner, 57, is also a debatable choice: as president/GM of the Reds from February 15, 1978, to July 11, 1983, he presided over the firing of Sparky Anderson and the loss of Pete Rose to free agency in 1978, then the further dismantling of the "Big Red Machine" that previously dominated the National League.
- September 14 – The red-hot Kansas City Royals win their 12th game in their last 13 outings, defeating the host Oakland Athletics, 2–1, on the strength of Bret Saberhagen's three-hitter. The Royals (81–59), who eight days ago jumped over the California Angels (79–63) to gain first place, now lead the AL West by three games.
- September 18:
  - The St. Louis Cardinals win their seventh straight road game, a 7–0 blanking of the Philadelphia Phillies at Veterans Stadium, behind Bob Forsch's four-hitter. Since dropping the rubber match of a three-game set to the rival New York Mets September 12, St. Louis has regained the NL East lead—which now stands at two games.
  - Bob Lurie, owner of the last-place San Francisco Giants (56–88), overhauls his management team, replacing general manager Tom Haller with Al Rosen, fired by the Astros only five days before. Lurie and Rosen then dismiss first-year manager Jim Davenport and name former Detroit Tigers pitching coach Roger Craig to take over the Giants' dugout. Rosen and Craig will lead an overhaul of the Giants themselves: they will win a division title in 1987 and a pennant in 1989.
  - Boston Red Sox catcher Rich Gedman hits for the cycle in his club's 13–1 romp over the Toronto Blue Jays at Fenway Park—the fourth and final "cycle" in MLB in 1985.
- September 19 – In the midst of a five-game winning streak, the California Angels force a flat-footed tie with the Kansas City Royals in the AL West, shutting down the Chicago White Sox, 8–0, behind August acquisition John Candelaria, who wins his fourth straight decision. Kansas City, meanwhile, suffers a crushing, late-inning 6–4 loss to the Seattle Mariners at Royals Stadium. The Angels and Royals are each 82–64, with 16 games left in the regular season.
- September 22 – New York Yankees pitcher Ed Whitson and manager Billy Martin get into a heated argument in a hotel bar in Baltimore. The ensuing fist fight results in a broken arm and bruised right side for Martin, 57, and a cracked rib and split lip for Whitson, 30.
- September 24 – At Wrigley Field, Andre Dawson of the Montreal Expos joins Willie McCovey as the only players to hit two home runs in the same inning twice in their careers. The two home runs come in a 12-run fifth inning that gives the Expos a 15–2 lead against the Chicago Cubs. The Expos hold on to win, 17–15, after nearly squandering the lead when the Cubs score 13 runs in the last four innings, including five in the ninth; the final out is recorded with the tying run at bat. Dawson (a future Cub) also hit two home runs in the third inning of the Expos' 19–0 pounding of the Braves at Atlanta–Fulton County Stadium on July 30, 1978.

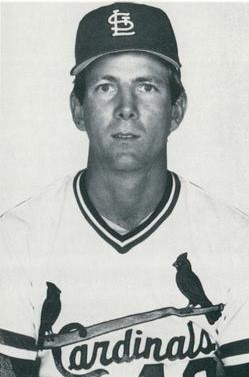
John Tudor

- September 26:
  - The Kansas City Royals tie the idle California Angels for first in the AL West with their 5–2 win over the Seattle Mariners at the Kingdome. Charlie Leibrandt wins his 17th game.
  - The St. Louis Cardinals conclude another seven-game winning streak—this time at Busch Memorial Stadium—with John Tudor's 5–0 shutout of the Philadelphia Phillies, his 20th victory of the season and tenth in a row. The Redbirds' NL East lead is now four games over the New York Mets with nine to play.
- September 28 – Cardinals rookie Vince Coleman swipes four bases in an 11-inning, 4–2 victory over the Expos in the second game of a doubleheader at Olympic Stadium—tying Rickey Henderson and Eddie Milner for most thefts by a player in a game in 1985. (Coleman had already stolen three bags in a game six times between April 21 and just three days ago.) After today, Coleman's stolen base total is 109—third most all-time, behind Henderson (130 in 1982) and Lou Brock (118 in 1974), of the post-1900 "modern era". The 24-year-old ends the regular season with 110 stolen bases; it's the first of six consecutive seasons during which the outfielder will lead the National League in the category.
- September 29:
  - The California Angels regain command of the AL West race, defeating the Cleveland Indians, 9–3, on the road, while the Kansas City Royals bow, 6–3, to the Minnesota Twins at the Hubert H. Humphrey Metrodome. The Angels, now with a one-game lead, and Royals each have seven games to play to decide their division. However, a critical four-game series between the two contenders will begin tomorrow in Kansas City.
  - The nationally telecast Twins–Royals contest will stand as Howard Cosell's final assignment in an ABC–TV broadcast booth. Roone Arledge, president of the network's sports division, will remove Cosell from the announcing team for the upcoming World Series when his scathing autobiography, which excoriates play-by-play man Al Michaels (among others), is excerpted. Cosell's replacement: former MLB catcher Tim McCarver, fast-rising star analyst on the New York Mets' TV crew.

=== October ===
- October 1 – Ron Darling and John Tudor duel for nine and ten scoreless innings, respectively, in this crucial series opener between the New York Mets (95–61) and front-running St. Louis Cardinals (98–58) at Busch Memorial Stadium. An 11th inning solo home run by Darryl Strawberry off Ken Dayley is the deciding factor in the Mets' 1–0 victory.
- October 2:
  - In Game 2 of the Mets–Cardinals series, Dwight Gooden triumphs 5–2 for his 24th win of the season. His ten-strikeout complete game caps a spectacular season in which the 20-year-old posts the best ERA in MLB (1.53), and the most wins, innings (2762/3), strikeouts (268), and complete games (16); twice he was named National League Player of the Week, and he's chosen the 1985 Baseball Digest Player of the Year. New York narrows the Redbirds' lead to one game, with four yet to play, in the NL East.
  - There's no pennant-race drama in the NL West: the Los Angeles Dodgers (94–64) claim their first division title since 1981 with a 9–3 home victory over the Atlanta Braves. Right-hander Orel Hershiser improves to 19–3 on the season.
  - The Galbreath family, principal owners of the Pittsburgh Pirates since 1950, and Warner Communications agree to sell the franchise for $22 million to Pittsburgh Associates, a public/private "coalition" committed to keeping the club in the Steel City. Corporate members include U.S. Steel and Westinghouse. A leading organizer is Pittsburgh attorney Carl Barger, who will become president of the Pirates in 1987.
  - In a major shake-up of his front office, Chicago White Sox principal owner Jerry Reinsdorf sidelines veteran general manager Roland Hemond and appoints former MLB first baseman and current ChiSox play-by-play announcer Ken Harrelson executive vice president of baseball operations. Hemond has played a key player personnel role for the White Sox since September 1970; Harrelson has no prior management experience.

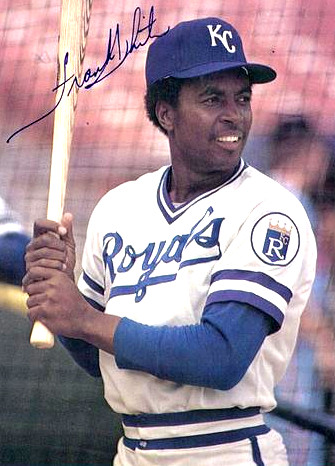
Frank White

- October 3:
  - The Kansas City Royals (now 89–70) defeat the visiting California Angels, 4–1, taking three out of four contests in their critical AL West confrontation and a one-game lead over the Halos (88–71) with only three to play in the regular season. A two-run homer by Frank White and stellar pitching by Danny Jackson and Dan Quisenberry are decisive.
  - Vince Coleman's two-RBI, fourth-inning single breaks a 1–1 deadlock and his St. Louis Cardinals hold on for a 4–3 victory over the New York Mets in the third and final game of their showdown in St. Louis. The Redbirds' lead over New York is back to two games, with three to play.
- October 5:
  - After dropping their first four October games and seeing their AL East lead dwindle to two games over the New York Yankees, the Toronto Blue Jays (99–61) clinch their first-ever division championship with a 5–1 victory over the second-place Bombers (96–64) at Exhibition Stadium. The former expansion team, in its ninth MLB season, is led today by Doyle Alexander, an ex-Yankee, who hurls a complete game for his 17th victory of 1985, supported by solo homers from Ernie Whitt, Lloyd Moseby and Willie Upshaw.
  - The Kansas City Royals (91–70) wrap up their sixth AL West title since 1976, defeating the visiting Oakland Athletics, 5–4, in ten innings. Willie Wilson drives home Pat Sheridan with the winning run.
  - The St. Louis Cardinals (101–60) clinch the NL East title, defeating the Chicago Cubs, 7–1, at Busch Memorial Stadium behind southpaw John Tudor's 19th victory in his last 20 decisions. Tudor's only loss since May 29 came against the Los Angeles Dodgers on July 20.
- October 6:
  - The Yankees' Phil Niekro becomes the second pitcher this year to record his 300th career win, shutting out the Blue Jays, 8–0. Famed knuckleballer Niekro doesn't throw his signature pitch today until he strikes out Jays' DH and former Atlanta Braves teammate Jeff Burroughs with the final pitch of the closing-day contest.
  - Left-handed-throwing Terry Francona, normally a first baseman, plays four innings at third base in the Montreal Expos' 2–1 victory over the New York Mets at Shea Stadium. He records three assists and makes no errors at the "hot corner."
- October 7:
  - The Pittsburgh Pirates' nightmarish season is capped by the firing of nine-year manager Chuck Tanner. The lifelong Western Pennsylvania resident had led the 1979 Pirates to a stirring World Series victory and compiled an overall record of 711–685 (.509) in Pittsburgh since 1977.
  - The Houston Astros' revamped front office fires manager Bob Lillis after 3½ seasons and a 276–261 (.514) record, ending the ex-shortstop's long association with the team, which began on October 10, 1961, when Houston selected him in the first NL expansion draft.
  - The first major trade of the off-season sees the Detroit Tigers deal pitchers Juan Berenguer and Scott Medvin (PTBNL) and catcher and future manager Bob Melvin to the San Francisco Giants for pitchers Eric King and Dave LaPoint and catcher Matt Nokes.
- October 8:
  - The 1985 campaign's League Championship Series begin at Exhibition Stadium, Toronto, with the Blue Jays' 6–1 victory over the Kansas City Royals in Game 1 of the ALCS. Dave Steib hurls eight shutout innings. The 1985 NLCS begins tomorrow at Dodger Stadium. Starting this season, each circuit's LCS matches the World Series' best-of-seven-games format; previously, from 1969–1984, the LCS were best-of-five series.
  - The Royals' farm system director, Dick Balderson, leaves the team to join the AL West-rival Seattle Mariners as their new general manager, formally titled as vice president, baseball operations. Balderson, 39, replaces Hal Keller in the role.
- October 12 – In Game 4 of the 1985 ALCS at Royals Stadium, Al Oliver keys a three-run, ninth-inning rally with his two-RBI, pinch double and the Toronto Blue Jays defeat Kansas City, 3–1, to take a three-games-to-one series lead. In the 16 previous years since the LCS debuted in 1969, three victories would have sealed a league pennant for Toronto, but the expanded best-of-seven format means the series must continue for a Game 5.
- October 13 – The St. Louis Cardinals overwhelm the Los Angeles Dodgers, 12–2, in Game 4 of the 1985 NLCS behind a 15-hit attack—but lose the services of rookie stolen-base king Vince Coleman when his left ankle is run over by Busch Memorial Stadium's automated tarp roller prior to the contest. While the Cardinals square the LCS at two games each, Coleman's freak injury will keep him out of the remainder of the postseason.
- October 15 – In Game 5 of the NLCS at St. Louis, defensive "wizard" Ozzie Smith breaks a 2–2 tie with his bottom-of-the-ninth walk-off home run off Tom Niedenfuer of the Los Angeles Dodgers, to give the Cardinals a 3–2 triumph and a three-games-to-two series edge. It's the switch-hitting Smith's first-ever MLB homer as a left-handed hitter.
- October 16:
  - In Game 7 of the ALCS, the visiting Kansas City Royals capture their third straight from the Toronto Blue Jays, 6–2, roaring back from a three-games-to-one deficit to win the second American League championship in their 17–year history. Jim Sundberg's three-run, sixth-inning triple puts the game out of reach.
  - In Game 6 of the NLCS at Dodger Stadium, Jack Clark slugs a three-run homer in the top of the ninth inning and Ken Dayley keeps Los Angeles off the board in the home half, delivering a 7–5 comeback win and the St. Louis Cardinals' 14th National League championship (and second in four years), setting the stage for an "All-Missouri" World Series. Clark's winning blow is surrendered by Tom Niedenfuer, the second decisive homer the Dodger reliever has allowed in consecutive games.

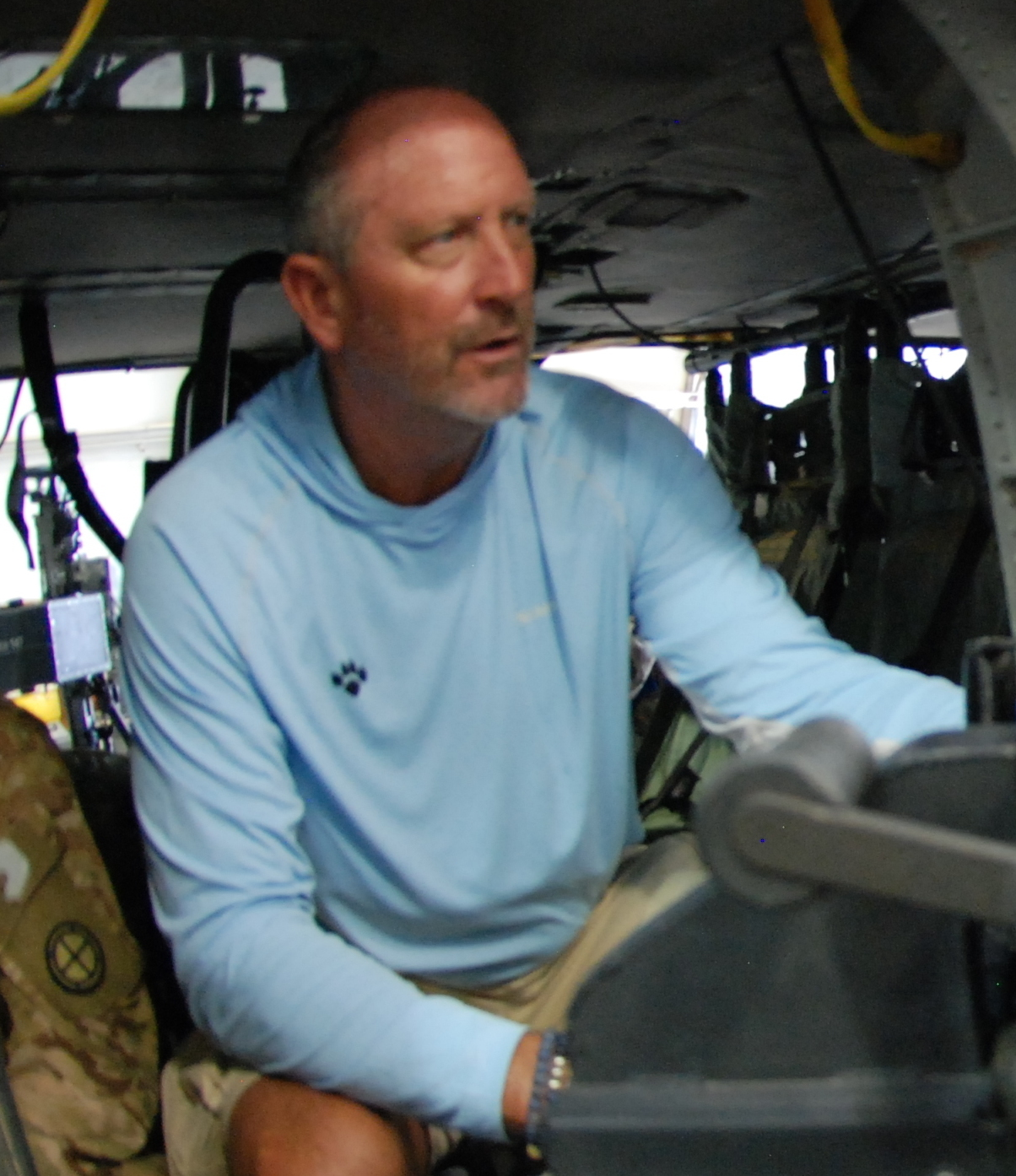
World Series MVP Bret Saberhagen (2008 photo)

- October 19 – When he takes the field for the Kansas City Royals in Game 1 of the 1985 World Series, Lonnie Smith becomes the first player in major league history to play in the World Series against the team (the St. Louis Cardinals) that traded him away during that same season.
- October 22 – Just six days after his AL East-champion Toronto Blue Jays were eliminated from the postseason, manager Bobby Cox quits his post to lead the re-building of his former team, the Atlanta Braves, as their general manager. A resident of nearby Marietta, Georgia, Cox, 44, signs a five-year, $1.8 million contract to replace John Mullen, who'll stay on as Cox' assistant GM.
  - Cox will inherit Chuck Tanner as his field manager. Braves' owner Ted Turner had hired the former Pittsburgh Pirates skipper on October 10, signing Tanner to a five-year contract to succeed interim pilot Bobby Wine.
  - On October 24, Blue Jay third-base coach Jimy Williams, 42, succeeds Cox as Toronto's skipper.
- October 24 – Kansas City Royals pitcher Danny Jackson throws an "Immaculate Inning" in Game 5 of the World Series, the first such inning in the Fall Classic's 82-year history. Jackson needs just nine pitches to retire Cardinals hitters Terry Pendleton, who fans, Tom Nieto, who's caught looking, and Brian Harper, who also strikes out swinging.
- October 26 – With champagne on ice in their clubhouse, the St. Louis Cardinals—ahead 1–0 in the bottom of the ninth of Game 6 at Royals Stadium and three-games-to-two in the 1985 World Series—are poised to capture the franchise's tenth Fall Classic, when an umpire's decision drastically changes momentum. American League arbiter Don Denkinger mistakenly calls Kansas City's Jorge Orta safe at first base while television replays conclusively show the runner out on a close play. Manager Whitey Herzog disputes the call, but it opens the floodgates: the Cardinals misplay a foul pop up and allow a base hit and a passed ball to put the tying and winning runs in scoring position; then pinch hitter Dane Iorg bloops a two-RBI single to right field and forces a Game 7 with a 2–1 Royals' victory.
- October 27:
  - For only the sixth time in MLB history and the second time in less than two weeks, a team—in each case, the 1985 Kansas City Royals—overcomes a three-games-to-one deficit to win a best-of-seven postseason series, when the Royals overwhelm the St. Louis Cardinals, 11–0, in Game 7 of the World Series. Bret Saberhagen fires a five-hitter, Darryl Motley starts the scoring with a two-run homer in the second inning, and Kansas City turns its third straight triumph into a rout with a six-run fifth inning. It's the Royals' first world championship; Saberhagen (2–0, 0.50, with 11 hits and one run allowed in 18 innings pitched) takes home Series MVP honors.
    - The Cardinals' fury at umpire Don Denkinger's "safe" call during the ninth inning of the previous night boils over during the Royals' six-run fifth. Manager Whitey Herzog is ejected by Denkinger, now working home plate, for arguing balls and strikes; then, one pitch later, hurler Joaquín Andújar is also tossed after he flies into a rage over a ball/strike call and charges at Denkinger before being restrained. Afterward, Herzog says: "When you get something taken away from you, you get teed off ... I wasn't arguing balls and strikes. I did yell, 'We shouldn't even be out here tonight. We should be home celebrating'."
  - New York Yankees owner George Steinbrenner dismisses manager Billy Martin for the fourth time. Martin's Yankees had compiled a stellar 91–54 (.628) record since he took over from Yogi Berra on April 28; however, late in the season, Steinbrenner was known to be displeased with Martin's off-field behavior and on-field decisions. Lou Piniella, 42, who won two World Series rings during his 11 seasons as a Yankees' outfielder and the team's hitting coach since his June 1984 retirement, is named Martin's replacement.

=== November ===
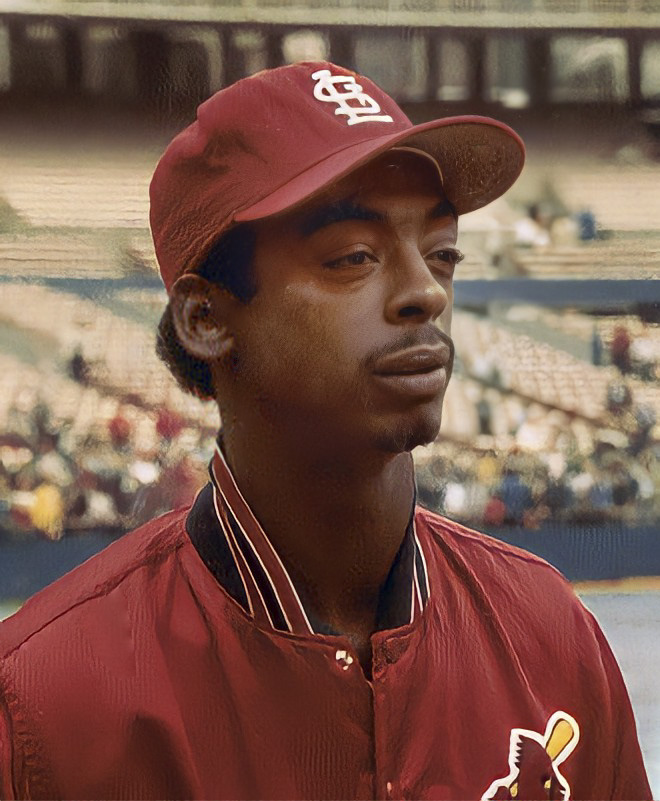
NL MVP Willie McGee

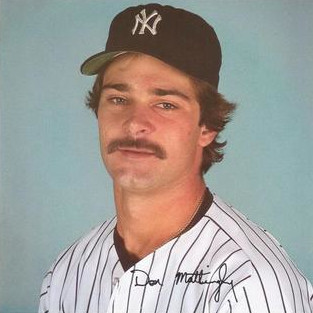
AL MVP Don Mattingly

- November 2:
  - The Hanshin Tigers defeat the Seibu Lions, 9–3, in Game 6 of the 1985 Japan Series to notch their only series win in franchise history. Tigers' first baseman and triple-crown winner Randy Bass is named Japan Series MVP, batting .368 with three homers and nine RBI.
  - The Texas Rangers obtain power-hitting prospect Pete Incaviglia from the Montreal Expos for pitcher Bob Sebra and shortstop Jim Anderson. Incaviglia, 21, an outfielder, had been picked in the first round (eighth overall) in the 1985 June draft, but he and the Expos had reached a stalemate in contract negotiations. He'll hit 30 home runs for the 1986 Rangers.
- November 5 – The Houston Astros fill their managerial vacancy, appointing former MLB second baseman Hal Lanier, 43, the ninth skipper in their 24-year history. Recruited from Whitey Herzog's St. Louis Cardinals coaching staff, Lanier says he will hire Yogi Berra as his bench coach. Berra, 60, had been fired as pilot of the New York Yankees on April 28.
- November 12:
  - The free-agency "Class of 1985" adds 58 players—most prominently, an in-his-prime Kirk Gibson as well as still-productive veterans like Carlton Fisk, Tommy John, Phil Niekro and Don Sutton. However, unlike the previous nine off-seasons since the Seitz decision, there will be no bidding frenzy among the 26 big-league clubs for their services. Reacting to October 22 comments from Commissioner of Baseball Peter Ueberroth that chided owners for "dumb" spending on playing talent, MLB magnates refrain from "poaching" each other's free agents (only four players will change teams), and lower their salary offers in contract negotiations. Agents and the MLBPA will file a grievance charging collusion in February 1986.
  - World Series MVP Bret Saberhagen adds the 1985 American League Cy Young Award to his collection, surpassing runner-up Ron Guidry, 23 first-place votes to four. At 21, the Kansas City Royals' right-hander is the AL's youngest CYA winner and he'll cop a second "Cy" in 1989.
- November 13:
  - Three days shy of his 21st birthday, Dwight Gooden of the New York Mets is unanimously voted the National League's Cy Young Award winner. He led the Senior Circuit this past season in bWAR (13.3), wins (24), ERA (1.53), and strikeouts (276). Gooden becomes MLB's "youngest" Cy Young winner.
  - The Boston Red Sox trade pitchers Bob Ojeda, Tom McCarthy, John Mitchell and Chris Bayer to the Mets for hurlers Calvin Schiraldi and Wes Gardner and outfielders John Christensen and La Schelle Tarver.
  - The Oakland Athletics send veteran outfielder Dave Collins to the Detroit Tigers for first baseman Bárbaro Garbey.
- November 14 – The Milwaukee Brewers unconditionally release future Hall of Famer Rollie Fingers, 39, ending a 17-season career that produced 944 games pitched (all but 37 in relief), 114 victories, 341 saves, three World Series rings, one MVP Award, one Cy Young Award, and seven All-Star selections.
- November 18 – Willie McGee, who led his league in hits (216) and batting (.353), and his St. Louis Cardinals to the pennant, is named NL Most Valuable Player. McGee takes 14 of 24 first-place votes, outdistancing runner-up Dave Parker (six votes) of the Cincinnati Reds.
- November 20:
  - The Pittsburgh Pirates appoint future Hall-of-Fame manager Jim Leyland to lead them on the field in 1986. It's the first big-league managing job for Leyland, 40, a former minor-league catcher and pilot who's spent the past four years as third-base coach of Tony LaRussa's Chicago White Sox. Thirteen days earlier, the Bucs had hired former scout Syd Thrift as general manager.
  - Don Mattingly of the New York Yankees takes 23 of 28 first-place votes to become 1985's American League MVP after a season in which he bats .324 with 211 hits, 34 home runs and a league-best 145 runs batted in. George Brett finishes a distant second.
- November 25:
  - Chicago White Sox shortstop Ozzie Guillén, who hit .273 and made just 12 errors in 150 games, is named American League Rookie of the Year. Milwaukee Brewers pitcher Teddy Higuera (15–8 record, 127 strikeouts, 3.90 ERA), finishes second.
  - The White Sox' recently appointed baseball operations chief, Ken Harrelson, makes his first trade, sending 19-year-old pitching prospect Edwin Correa and middle infielders Scott Fletcher and José Mota (PTBNL) to the Texas Rangers for pitcher Dave Schmidt and second baseman Wayne Tolleson.
- November 26 – The California Angels retain the services of 16-year veteran second baseman Bobby Grich, 36, granted free agency November 12. On December 5, the Angels will also return free-agent pitcher and future Hall of Famer Don Sutton, 40 and a 20-year veteran, to the fold.
- November 27 – Vince Coleman, who stole 110 bases for the St. Louis Cardinals last season, third highest in the modern era, joins Frank Robinson (1956), Orlando Cepeda (1958) and Willie McCovey (1959) as the only unanimous winners of the NL Rookie of the Year Award.

=== December ===
- December 4 – The Oakland Athletics retain veteran first baseman Bruce Bochte, granted free agency November 12. Bochte, 35, started 102 games at first for Oakland in 1985, and batted .295 with 125 hits.
- December 8 – The world-champion Kansas City Royals retain designated hitter Hal McRae, granted free agency November 12. McRae, 40, will return to the Royals for his 14th season.
- December 10:
  - At the annual winter meetings, held this year in San Diego, the marquee free-agent market remains dormant and owners extend their "gentleman's agreement" to control salaries by abandoning the traditional 25-man active roster in favor of a 24-player limit, the minimum number permitted by the existing collective bargaining agreement with the MLBPA.
  - The National League-champion St. Louis Cardinals trade 1985 All-Star and 21-game-winner Joaquín Andújar to the Oakland Athletics for left-hander Tim Conroy, who spent most of last season at Triple-A, and starting catcher Mike Heath. Andújar's ejection from Game 7 of the 1985 World Series is his last appearance in a Cardinal uniform.
  - In another eye-catching transaction, the Atlanta Braves and Philadelphia Phillies exchange four players, with the Braves sending starter/reliever Steve Bedrosian and outfielder Milt Thompson to the Phils for pitching prospect Pete Smith and catcher Ozzie Virgil Jr., a 1985 NL All-Star.
- December 11:
  - The Phillies make another trade, sending pitchers John Denny and Jeff Gray to the Cincinnati Reds for pitcher Tom Hume and outfielder Gary Redus.
  - The San Francisco Giants obtain outfielder Candy Maldonado from the Los Angeles Dodgers for catcher Alex Treviño. Maldonado, 25, will hold down the Giants' right-field job for the next four seasons.
  - The Dodgers then part with 14-year veteran catcher Steve Yeager, 37, trading him to the Seattle Mariners for southpaw Ed Vande Berg, and the Giants deal veteran second baseman Manny Trillo to the Chicago Cubs for utility infielder Dave Owen. Trillo, now 35, returns to Chicago, where he was the Cubs' standout second sacker between 1975 and 1978.
  - The Milwaukee Brewers trade infielder Ed Romero to the Boston Red Sox for relief pitcher Mark Clear.
- December 12:
  - Ignoring the advice of team physicians, George Steinbrenner of the New York Yankees acquires left-hander Britt Burns, 26, a former AL All-Star, from the Chicago White Sox, along with two minor leaguers, for right-hander Joe Cowley and catcher Ron Hassey. Burns won 18 games for Chicago in 1985 and has posted a 70–60 (3.66) record in 193 games since 1978. But degenerative osteoarthritis in his right hip will force him to the sidelines during his first Yankees' spring training camp. He will undergo hip replacement surgery in May 1986 and ultimately end his playing career after a brief comeback attempt in 1990. He will never pitch in an official game for the Bombers.
  - The Yankees also make a deal with the division-rival Baltimore Orioles, sending pitcher Rich Bordi and infielder Rex Hudler to Baltimore for outfielder Gary Roenicke and a PTBNL (third baseman Leo Hernández).
  - The Detroit Tigers acquire third baseman Darnell Coles from the Seattle Mariners for pitcher Rich Monteleone, a former (1982) #1 draft pick.
- December 16 – The Houston Astros trade former NL All-Star Jerry Mumphrey to the Chicago Cubs for fellow outfielder Billy Hatcher and a PTBNL (left-handed hurler Steve Engel).
- December 17:
  - The San Francisco Giants retain left-handed pitcher Vida Blue, granted free agency on November 12. Blue, 36, will finish his MLB career with the 1986 Giants, posting a creditable 10–10 (3.27) record in 28 starts.
  - The Boston Red Sox acquire relief pitcher Sammy Stewart from the Baltimore Orioles for shortstop Jackie Gutiérrez.
- December 18 – The Milwaukee Brewers obtain 25-year-old outfielder Rob Deer from the Giants for minor-league pitchers Dean Freeland and Eric Pilkington. Deer will win Milwaukee's right field job in 1986, and over the next five seasons he will average 27 home runs and 165 strikeouts.
- December 19 – In a six-player deal, the Cincinnati Reds send pitchers Andy McGaffigan, John Stuper and Jay Tibbs and catcher Dann Bilardello to the Montreal Expos for right-hander Bill Gullickson and catcher Sal Butera.
- December 22 – The Milwaukee Brewers retain right-handed starting pitcher Danny Darwin, granted free agency from them on November 12.
- December 27 – The California Angels trade pitcher Luis Sánchez and catcher Tim Arnold to the Montreal Expos for southpaw relief specialist Gary Lucas.

== Movies ==
- The Slugger's Wife

== Births ==
=== January ===
- January 4 – Scott Sizemore
- January 7 – José García
- January 8 – Matt LaPorta
- January 10 – Samuel Gervacio
- January 12 – Chris Hatcher
- January 16:
  - Junior Guerra
  - Jeff Manship
- January 17:
  - Chad Beck
  - Emmanuel Burriss
  - Jai Miller
- January 20:
  - Fabio Castro
  - Luis Pérez
- January 22 – Scott Cousins
- January 23 – Jeff Samardzija
- January 24:
  - Niuman Romero
  - Jay Sborz
- January 25 – Shane Lindsay
- January 28 – Wesley Wright

=== February ===
- February 1:
  - Colin Curtis
  - Elian Herrera
- February 2 – Scott Maine
- February 5 – Eric O'Flaherty
- February 8 – Félix Pie
- February 12 – Cole De Vries
- February 13 – Logan Ondrusek
- February 14 – Tyler Clippard
- February 15 – Russ Mitchell
- February 16 – Clint Robinson
- February 19 – Dan Otero
- February 20:
  - Vinnie Pestano
  - Ryan Sweeney
- February 25 – Xavier Paul

=== March ===
- March 2:
  - Bud Norris
  - Brandon Wood
- March 4:
  - Cory Luebke
  - Michael McKenry
- March 5 – Brad Mills
- March 9:
  - Brian Bocock
  - Jesse Litsch
- March 12 – P. J. Walters
- March 14 – Steven Hill
- March 15 – Jon Jay
- March 17 – César Valdez
- March 20 – Jonny Venters
- March 22 – Justin Masterson
- March 28 – Mark Melancon
- March 30 – Dan Runzler

=== April ===
- April 1 – Daniel Murphy
- April 3:
  - Mike McClendon
  - Luis Martínez
- April 5:
  - Lastings Milledge
  - Héctor Olivera
  - Ian Stewart
- April 8:
  - Juan Abreu
  - Matt Antonelli
- April 9 – David Robertson
- April 10:
  - Jonathan Diaz
  - Clayton Mortensen
- April 12:
  - Brennan Boesch
  - Adonis García
- April 15:
  - John Danks
  - Aaron Laffey
- April 23 – Emilio Bonifacio
- April 24 – Ryan Reid
- April 26 – Sean Rodriguez
- April 28 – John Gaub
- April 29:
  - Austin Bibens-Dirkx
  - Chad Huffman

=== May ===
- May 2:
  - José Ascanio
  - Jarrod Saltalamacchia
  - David Sutherland
- May 3 – Nate Spears
- May 10 – Luis Atilano
- May 13 – David Hernandez
- May 15 – Jim Adduci
- May 17 – Todd Redmond
- May 18 – Andrew Carpenter
- May 20 – Toru Murata
- May 21 – Andrew Miller
- May 22 – Rick van den Hurk
- May 23:
  - Michael Dunn
  - Matt McBride
- May 25:
  - Brad Lincoln
  - Eric Young
- May 26:
  - Kevin Mulvey
  - Lance Zawadzki
- May 30:
  - Fernando Salas
  - Tony Watson

=== June ===
- June 3 – Lucas Harrell
- June 6 – Trystan Magnuson
- June 12 – George Kontos
- June 13 – Pedro Strop
- June 15 – Michael Fiers
- June 18 – Chris Coghlan
- June 19 – Blake Parker
- June 20 – Brooks Brown
- June 25 – Daniel Bard
- June 27 – Steve Edlefsen
- June 28 – Colt Hynes
- June 30 – Pat Venditte

=== July ===
- July 1 – Chris Perez
- July 3 – Greg Reynolds
- July 4 – Jared Hughes
- July 7 – Leyson Séptimo
- July 15 – David Carpenter
- July 18 – Ramiro Peña
- July 19:
  - Ernesto Frieri
  - Evan Scribner
- July 21:
  - Wei-Yin Chen
  - Rob Wooten
- July 22 – Denis Phipps
- July 25 – Alex Presley
- July 26 – Mat Gamel
- July 28 – Henry Sosa
- July 30 – Dylan Axelrod

=== August ===
- August 1:
  - Cole Kimball
  - Adam Jones
- August 5 – Travis Denker
- August 8 – Blake Wood
- August 12:
  - Zack Cozart
  - Jhonatan Solano
- August 13 – Scott Elbert
- August 14:
  - Esmil Rogers
  - Chris Valaika
  - Trent D'Antonio
- August 16 – Daric Barton
- August 19 – Josh Fields
- August 20:
  - Blake DeWitt
  - Matt Hague
- August 22:
  - Ryan Feierabend
  - Sandy Rosario
- August 24:
  - Christian Garcia
  - Anthony Ortega
- August 26:
  - Eric Fryer
  - Darin Mastroianni
  - David Price
- August 28 – Deunte Heath
- August 29 – Marc Rzepczynski

=== September ===
- September 3:
  - Chris Nelson
  - Troy Patton
- September 4 – David Herndon
- September 5 – Tyler Colvin
- September 6 – Mitch Moreland
- September 7 – Wade Davis
- September 10:
  - Matt Angle
  - Anthony Swarzak
  - Neil Walker
- September 11 – Bobby Cassevah
- September 13 – Lucas French
- September 14:
  - Brandon Hicks
  - Delmon Young
- September 16 – Matt Harrison
- September 17:
  - Greg Golson
  - Eric Hurley
  - B. J. Rosenberg
- September 19 – Gio González
- September 20:
  - Ian Desmond
  - Kevin Mattison
- September 21 – Antonio Bastardo
- September 23 – Joba Chamberlain
- September 25:
  - Brad Bergesen
  - Bo Schultz
- September 27 – Pedro Ciriaco
- September 30:
  - Dan Robertson
  - Jamie Romak
  - Danny Worth

=== October ===
- October 1:
  - Mitch Atkins
  - Darren Ford
  - Jeremy Horst
- October 6 – Andrew Albers
- October 7:
  - Evan Longoria
  - Kris Medlen
- October 8 – Cody Eppley
- October 16 – Enerio Del Rosario
- October 17:
  - José De La Torre
  - Carlos González
- October 18 – Yoenis Céspedes
- October 23 – Sam Demel
- October 25 – Wilkin Ramírez
- October 27 – Kyle Waldrop
- October 31:
  - Javy Guerra
  - Andy Parrino

=== November ===
- November 1 – Paulo Orlando
- November 2 – Daryl Thompson
- November 4 – Joe Savery
- November 7 – Mitch Harris
- November 8 – Darwin Barney
- November 13 – Asdrúbal Cabrera
- November 15 – Duane Below
- November 18 – Bruce Billings
- November 19 – Brad Harman
- November 20:
  - C. J. Fick
  - Greg Holland
- November 22 – Adam Ottavino
- November 23 – Pedro Figueroa
- November 26:
  - Corey Brown
  - Matt Carpenter
- November 26 – Jhonny Núñez
- November 30 – Luis Valbuena

=== December ===
- December 1 – Eddy Rodríguez
- December 2 - Ernesto Mejía
- December 4:
  - Andrew Brackman
  - Carlos Gómez
- December 8:
  - Josh Donaldson
  - Robbie Weinhardt
- December 17 – Fernando Abad
- December 19 – Michael Taylor
- December 20 – Tyler Sturdevant
- December 21:
  - Ed Easley
  - Matt Mangini
  - Brian Schlitter
- December 22 – Daniel Stange
- December 24 – Andrew Romine
- December 26 – Chris Carpenter
- December 30 – Sean Gallagher
- December 31 – Evan Reed

== Deaths ==
=== January ===
- January 16 – Ken Chase, 71, pitcher for the Washington Senators, Boston Red Sox and New York Giants between 1936 and 1943.
- January 30 – Joe Bradshaw, 87, pitcher for the 1929 Brooklyn Robins.

=== February ===
- February 3 – Johnnie Bob Dixon, 85, pitched for six Negro leagues teams over five seasons in a period spanning 1926 and 1934.
- February 4 – Bobby Young, 60, second baseman who hit .248 in an eight-year career with the St. Louis Cardinals, St. Louis Browns, Baltimore Orioles and Cleveland Indians from 1948 to 1958.
- February 10 – Johnny Mokan, 89, outfielder who hit .291 in 582 games for the Pirates and Phillies between 1921 and 1927.
- February 12 – Van Lingle Mungo, 73, All-Star pitcher whose antics delighted Brooklyn Dodgers fans; led NL in strikeouts, shutouts and innings once each.
- February 17 – George Washington, 77, outfielder who hit .268 with two home runs for the Chicago White Sox from 1935–36.
- February 20 – Syl Johnson, 84, pitcher who posted a 112–117 record with four different teams over 19 seasons (1922–1940), and a member of the 1931 World Champion St. Louis Cardinals.
- February 26 – George Uhle, 86, pitcher for the Indians and Tigers who won 200 games and is credited with having developed the slider pitch in the 1920s; also batted .289, one of the highest averages for a pitcher.

=== March ===
- March 1 – George Banks, 46, third baseman/outfielder who hit .219 in 106 games for the Minnesota Twins and Cleveland Indians from 1962 to 1966.
- March 2 – Leslie Green, 71, All-Star outfielder whose career in the Negro and Mexican leagues stretched from 1939 to 1946.
- March 8 – Al Todd, 83, catcher for the Phillies, Pirates, Dodgers and Cubs between 1932 and 1943; later a minor league manager.
- March 10:
  - Bill Cooper, 70, left-handed-hitting catcher for four Negro leagues teams between 1938 and 1946.
  - Bob Nieman, 58, left fielder who appeared in 1,113 games for six teams between 1951 and 1962 and batted .300 twice for the Baltimore Orioles; first player to hit home runs in his first two major league at-bats; later a scout.
- March 17 – Ike Pearson, 68, pitcher who posted a 13–50 record hurling for two struggling teams, the Philadelphia Phillies (1939–1942 and 1946) and Chicago White Sox (1948).
- March 22 – Arthur Allyn Jr., 71, co-owner and club president of the Chicago White Sox from 1961 to 1969.
- March 25:
  - Curt Barclay, 53, pitcher who posted a 10–9 record with a 3.48 for the Giants from 1957 to 1959.
  - Joe Wood, 65, infielder who played briefly for the 1943 Detroit Tigers.
- March – Roland Calhoun, 72, who pitched for the Pittsburgh Crawfords and the Washington Black Senators of the Negro National League in 1932.

=== April ===
- April 5 – Hal Totten, 83, Chicago-based sportscaster who did play-by-play for the Cubs and White Sox from 1924 to 1945 and the Mutual Network Game of the Day from 1946 to 1950; also a minor league executive.
- April 8 – Joe Sullivan, 74, knuckleballing southpaw pitcher for three teams from to 1935 to 1941, and a member of the 1935 World Champion Detroit Tigers.
- April 16 – Benny Zientara, 67, second baseman for the Cincinnati Reds in the 1940s.
- April 23:
  - Bob Wilson, 60, right fielder for the 1958 Los Angeles Dodgers.
  - Whitey Wistert, 73, pitcher for the 1934 Cincinnati Reds, and a World War II veteran.

=== May ===
- May 1 – Frank Glieber, 51, Dallas sportscaster and longtime CBS-TV NFL announcer who was the television voice of MLB's Texas Rangers from 1978 to 1980.
- May 4 – Bill Kunkel, 48, AL umpire since 1968 who worked two World Series and four ALCS; previously a relief pitcher who appeared in 89 games for the Kansas City Athletics and New York Yankees (1961–1963); father of shortstop Jeff Kunkel.
- May 5:
  - Joe Glenn, 76, catcher for the New York Yankees, St. Louis Browns and Boston Red Sox, who caught Babe Ruth during his last pitching appearance in 1933, and also caught Ted Williams in a rare relief appearance in 1940.
  - Charles Shipman Payson, 86, who succeeded his late wife, Joan Whitney Payson, as principal owner of the New York Mets in 1975 until selling the team in 1980 to Nelson Doubleday Jr. and Fred Wilpon.
- May 6:
  - Kirby Higbe, 70, All-Star pitcher for five NL teams who won 22 games for the 1941 Brooklyn Dodgers.
  - Red Peery, 78, pitcher for the Pittsburgh Pirates and Boston Braves between 1927 and 1929.
- May 10 – Walter Burch, 77, manager who led the Cleveland–Cincinnati Buckeyes of the Negro American League to a 13–9 record during part of the 1942 season.
- May 11:
  - Johnny Bero, 62, shortstop who played in 65 major-league games for the 1948 Detroit Tigers and 1951 St. Louis Browns.
  - Ramón Bragaña, 76, pitcher, catcher and corner outfielder for the 1928 Cuban Stars East of the Eastern Colored League who had a lengthy career in Black and winter baseball; member of the Cuban and Mexican baseball halls of fame.
  - Bud Teachout, 81, pitcher and outfielder for the Chicago Cubs and St. Louis Cardinals from 1930 to 1932.
- May 14:
  - Earl Bumpus, 71, outfielder, first baseman and southpaw hurler for the Kansas City Monarchs, Birmingham Black Barons and Chicago American Giants of the Negro American League between 1944 and 1948.
  - Harry Byrd, 60, All-Star pitcher and American League Rookie of the Year in 1952, who posted a 46–54 career record with a 4.35 ERA for five American League teams.
  - Bill Morley, 95, second baseman for the 1913 Washington Senators.
- May 16 – Johnny Broaca, 73, Yale-educated pitcher who posted a 44–29 record with a 4.08 ERA in 121 games for the Yankees and Indians from 1934 to 1939.
- May 21:
  - Archie McKain, 74, left-handed reliever who posted a 26–21 record with a 4.26 ERA and 16 saves for the Red Sox, Tigers and Browns from 1937–43.
  - Grover Powell, 44, left-handed pitcher for the 1963 New York Mets, who hurled a four-hit shutout in his first start but was struck in the face by a Donn Clendenon line drive in his next start and never won another game.
- May 23 – Whitey Wilshere, 72, pitcher who posted a 10–12 record with a 5.28 ERA for the Philadelphia Athletics from 1934 through 1936.
- May 29 – Billy Zitzmann, 89, outfielder who hit a .267 career average with Cincinnati and Pittsburgh between 1919 and 1929.
- May 31 – Jake Early, 70, catcher who hit .241 with 32 home runs and 264 RBI in 747 games for the Washington Senators and St. Louis Browns from 1939 to 1949.
- May – Pete McQueen, 76, outfielder who played for three Negro leagues clubs over three seasons (1932, 1936, 1937).

=== June ===
- June 2 – Dorothy Mueller, 59, All-Star pitcher and a member of three champion teams of the AAGPBL from 1947 to 1953.
- June 10 – Bob Prince, 68, nicknamed "The Gunner", legendary radio and television voice of the Pittsburgh Pirates from 1948 to 1975; elected to broadcasters' wing of Baseball Hall of Fame in 1986; also did play-by-play for ABC Monday Night Baseball and the Houston Astros.
- June 23 – Alf Anderson, 71, shortstop who played 126 games for the Pittsburgh Pirates (1940–1941 and 1946).
- June 26 – Wes Schulmerich, 83, outfielder who hit .289 in 429 games with the Boston Braves, Philadelphia Phillies and Cincinnati Reds from 1931 to 1934.
- June 29 – Orville Singer, 86, outfielder for five Negro leagues teams, primarily the New York Lincoln Giants, between 1923 and 1932.

=== July ===
- July 2 – Guy Bush, 83, pitcher who won 176 games, most with the Chicago Cubs, but was best remembered for having given up Babe Ruth's last home run.
- July 4 – Frank Walsh, 79, National League umpire who worked in 344 games between September 1961 and September 1963; umpired in over 4,000 games in organized baseball.
- July 14 – Larry Drake, 64, outfielder who played from 1945 through 1948 for the Washington Senators and Philadelphia Athletics.
- July 24 – Ted Kleinhans, 86, left handed reliever who posted a 4–9 record with a 5.08 ERA and one save for the Reds, Yankees and Phillies from 1934 to 1938.
- July 27:
  - Smoky Joe Wood, 95, pitcher for the Red Sox who posted a 34–5 record with a 1.91 ERA in 1912, and went on to win three games in the World Series against the New York Giants; after wearing out his arm by age 26 with a record of 117–57, returned as an outfielder with the Indians and batted .366 while platooning in 1921; later coached at Yale for 20 years.
  - Carl Yowell, 82, pitcher for the Cleveland Indians in the 1920s.

=== August ===
- August 3 – Cloy Mattox, 82, backup catcher who hit a .167 average for the 1929 Philadelphia Athletics.
- August 7 – Johnny Rucker, 68, center fielder who hit .272 in 705 games for the New York Giants from 1940 to 1946, leading his team in at-bats (622), hits (179), doubles (38), triples (9) and runs (95) during the 1941 season.
- August 15 – Sam Streeter, 84, Negro league baseball player.
- August 16 – Dick Drott, 49, pitcher for the Cubs and Colt .45s from 1957 to 1963, who posted a 15–11 record with a 3.58 in his season debut, ending third in the Rookie of the Year vote behind pitcher Jack Sanford (19–8, 3.08) and first baseman Ed Bouchee (.293, 17 HR, 76 RBI).
- August 20 – Clarence Fieber, 71, left handed reliever for the 1932 Chicago White Sox.
- August 21 – Roy Luebbe, 84, backup catcher for the 1925 New York Yankees.
- August 24 – Boots McClain, 86, infielder who played for seven Negro National League teams over six seasons between 1920 and 1926.
- August 25 – Dick Wakefield, 64, All-Star left fielder who played for the Detroit Tigers, New York Yankees and New York Giants between 1941 and 1952.
- August 26 – Stu Clarke, 79, backup infielder who hit .273 in 61 games for the Pittsburgh Pirates from 1929 to 1930.
- August 27:
  - Rogelio Crespo, 90, Havana-born infielder who played for the Cuban Stars East of the Eastern Colored League in 1926 and 1927.
  - Johnny Lindell, 68, 1943 All-Star outfielder who hit .273 in a 12-year career; also posted an 8–18 record with a 4.47 ERA as a pitcher; won three World Series rings with the Yankees in 1943, 1947 and 1949.
- August 31 – Lefty Smoll, 71, pitcher for the 1940 Philadelphia Phillies.

=== September ===
- September 4 – Art Bramhall, 74, backup infielder for the 1935 Philadelphia Phillies.
- September 5 – Blaine Walsh, 60, sportscaster; member of the Braves' radio or TV broadcast team from 1953 to 1965, the franchise's 13-year tenure in Milwaukee.
- September 12 – Steamboat Struss, 76, pitcher for the 1934 Pittsburgh Pirates.
- September 21 – George Jefferson, 63, pitcher for the Cleveland Buckeyes of the Negro American League (1944–1945, 1947–1948).
- September – Lloyd Davenport, 73, outfielder and five-time Negro leagues All-Star who played in black and independent baseball between 1935 and 1951, and briefly appeared in "organized" minor league baseball in 1953 at age 42.

=== October ===
- October 7 – Philly Holmes, 72, shortstop whose career in black baseball spanned 1937 to 1945, including three years in the Negro American League; brother of Lefty Holmes.
- October 8 – Subby Byas, 75, catcher, first baseman and outfielder for three Negro leagues clubs, chiefly the Chicago American Giants, between 1932 and 1942.
- October 9 – Rusty Yarnall, 82, pitcher for the 1926 Philadelphia Athletics.
- October 14 – Ossie Bluege, 84, All-Star third baseman who spent his entire 50-year baseball career with the Washington Senators/Minnesota Twins; played for 18 seasons (1922–1939), then served as a coach (1940–1942), manager (1943–1947), farm system director (1948–1957) and comptroller (1958–1971).
- October 17 – Bud Sheely, 64, backup catcher who hit .210 in 101 games for the Chicago White Sox from 1951 to 1953; son of Earl Sheely.
- October 20 – Hal Goldsmith, 87, pitcher who posted a 6–10 record with a 4.04 ERA for the Boston Braves and St. Louis Cardinals from 1926 to 1929.
- October 26 – Bob Scheffing, 72, catcher, coach, manager and executive; hit .263 with 20 home runs and 187 RBI in 517 games for the Chicago Cubs, Cincinnati Reds and St. Louis Cardinals between 1941 and 1951; managed Cubs from 1957 through 1959 and Detroit Tigers from 1961 until June 16, 1963; succeeded Johnny Murphy as general manager of the New York Mets upon Murphy's sudden death in January 1970, and served as GM through the 1974 season.
- October – Barney Brown, 77 or 78, southpaw whose career in black baseball spanned 1931 through 1948, notably with New York Black Yankees and Philadelphia Stars; led 1942 Negro National League in complete games, shutouts, innings pitched, and games lost.

=== November ===
- November 11:
  - Roy Lee, 68, left handed pitcher for the 1945 New York Giants.
  - Frank Mulroney, 82, pitcher who had a two-game "cup of coffee" for the 1930 Boston Red Sox.
- November 12 – Augie Walsh, 81, pitcher who went 4–10 with the Philadelphia Phillies from 1927 to 1928.
- November 14:
  - Oscar Harstad, 93, pitcher who posted a 3–5 record with a 3.40 ERA in 32 games for the 1915 Cleveland Indians.
  - Luke Nelson, 91, relief pitcher who posted a 3–0 mark with a 2.96 ERA in nine appearances with the 1919 New York Yankees.
- November 15 – Riggs Stephenson, 87, left fielder who batted .336 lifetime with 1,515 hits, while usually platooning for the Cleveland Indians (1921–1925) and Chicago Cubs (1926–1934).
- November 23 – Sam West, 81, center fielder for the Washington Senators (1927–1932, 1938–1941) and St. Louis Browns (1933–1938) who batted .300 eight times; four-time AL All-Star.
- November 25 – Ray Jablonski, 58, All-Star third baseman, mainly with the Cardinals, Reds and Giants, who had 100 RBI in his first two seasons.
- November 26 – Monk Sherlock, 81, first baseman who hit .324 in 92 games for the 1930 Philadelphia Phillies.
- November 30 – Jim Grant, 91, pitcher for the 1923 Philadelphia Phillies.

=== December ===
- December 6 – Burleigh Grimes, 92, "Old Stubblebeard", Hall of Fame pitcher who won 270 games between 1916 and 1934, 158 of them for Brooklyn, with five 20-win seasons using the spitball, of which he was the last legal practitioner; later managed 1937–1938 Dodgers and for 14 seasons in minors, and was a longtime scout.
- December 8:
  - Dave Madison, 64, relief pitcher who played from 1950 through 1953 for the Detroit Tigers, St. Louis Browns and New York Yankees.
  - Bill Wambsganss, 91, second baseman for the Cleveland Indians (1914–1923) and member of their 1920 World Series champions, who made the only unassisted triple play in World Series history; also played for the Boston Red Sox and Philadelphia Athletics (1924–1926); later became a manager in the All-American Girls Professional Baseball League.
- December 14 – Roger Maris, 51, seven-time All-Star right fielder whose 61 home runs in 1961 broke Babe Ruth's long-standing record, earning him his second consecutive American League MVP award and setting an MLB standard that would last for 37 years; the Yankees, for whom Maris starred from 1960 to 1966, retired his #9 uniform in 1984; three-time World Series champion — 1961 and 1962 with Yanks and 1967 with St. Louis Cardinals — and 1960 Gold Glove winner; also played for Cleveland Indians and Kansas City Athletics during his 12-season (1957–1968) career.
- December 17:
  - Elmer Bowman, 88, pinch-hitter for the 1920 Washington Senators.
  - Ken O'Dea, 72, All-Star catcher who hit a .255 average with 40 home runs and 323 RBI in a 12-year career with three teams, and was a member of the St. Louis Cardinals teams that won the World Series in 1942 and 1944.
- December 21 – Joe Genewich, 88, pitcher who went 73–92 with the Boston Braves and New York Giants from 1922 to 1930, who led Major League pitchers with 17 putouts in the 1917 season.
- December 26:
  - Les Bell, 84, third baseman who hit .290 with 66 home runs and 509 RBI in a nine-season career with three teams, and a member of the 1926 World Series champion St. Louis Cardinals.
  - Jim Bilbrey, 61, pitcher for the 1949 St. Louis Browns.
