= Leslie Green (disambiguation) =

Leslie Green may refer to:

- Leslie Green (1875-1908), English architect
- Leslie Green (baseball) (1914-1985), Baseball player
- Les Green (1941-2012), English footballer and manager
- Leslie Green (philosopher) (born 1956), Scottish-Canadian legal scholar
- Les Green, Teacher and U.S. congressional candidate, see 2010 United States House of Representatives elections in Mississippi
