= Kevin Mattison =

American baseball player (born 1985)

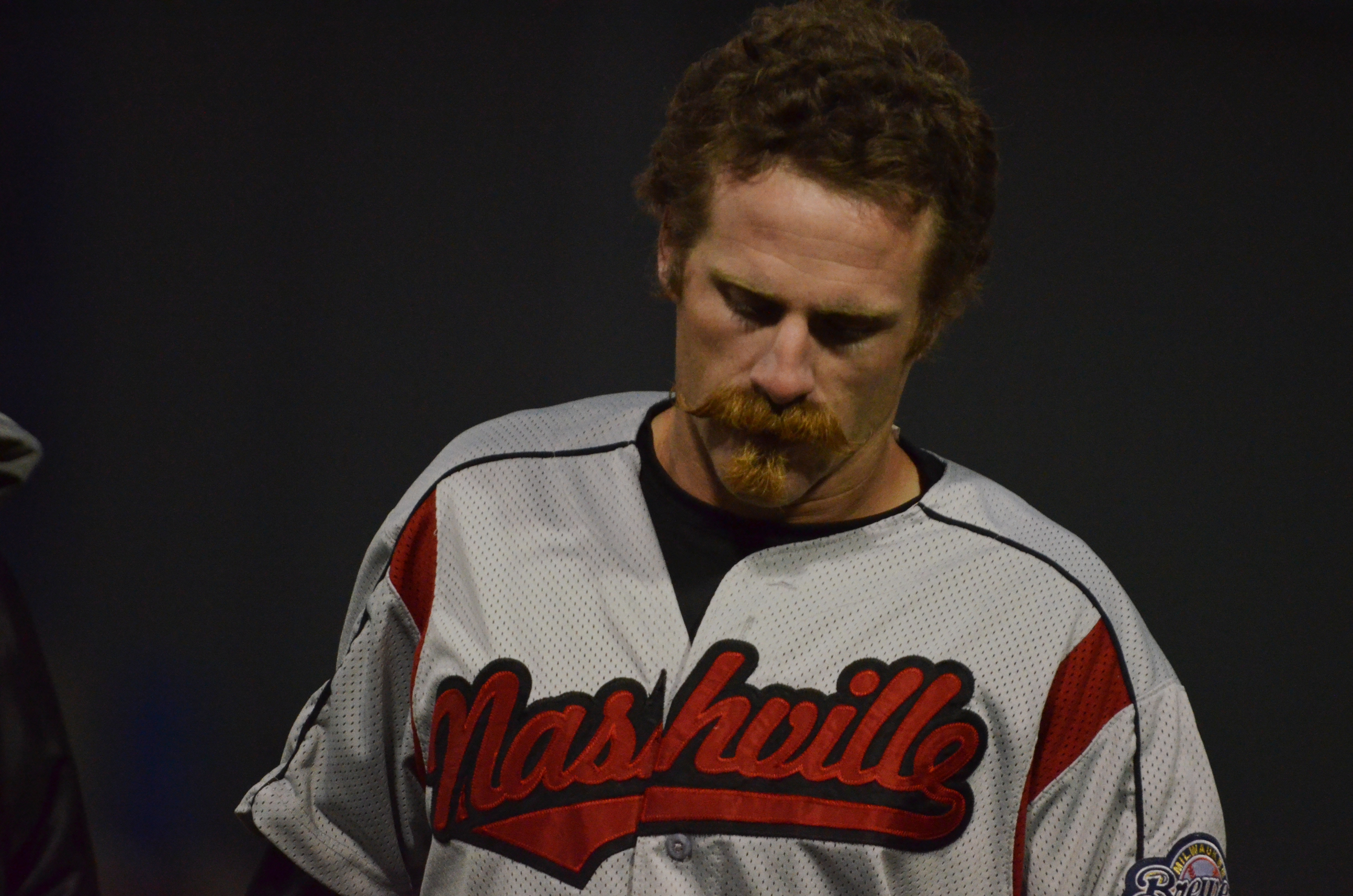
- Mattison with the Nashville Sounds, the Triple-A affiliates of the Milwaukee Brewers, in 2014
- Outfielder
- Born: September 20, 1985 (age 40); Fort Lauderdale, Florida, U.S.
- Batted: Left Threw: Left

MLB debut
- May 12, 2012, for the Miami Marlins

Last MLB appearance
- May 25, 2012, for the Miami Marlins

MLB statistics
- Batting average: .000
- Home runs: 0
- Runs batted in: 0
- Stats at Baseball Reference

Teams
- Miami Marlins (2012)

Kevin Mattison (born September 20, 1985) is an American former professional baseball outfielder. He played in Major League Baseball (MLB) for the Miami Marlins. Mattison attended the University of North Carolina at Asheville, where he played college baseball for the UNC Asheville Bulldogs baseball team.

== Professional career ==
=== Florida / Miami Marlins ===
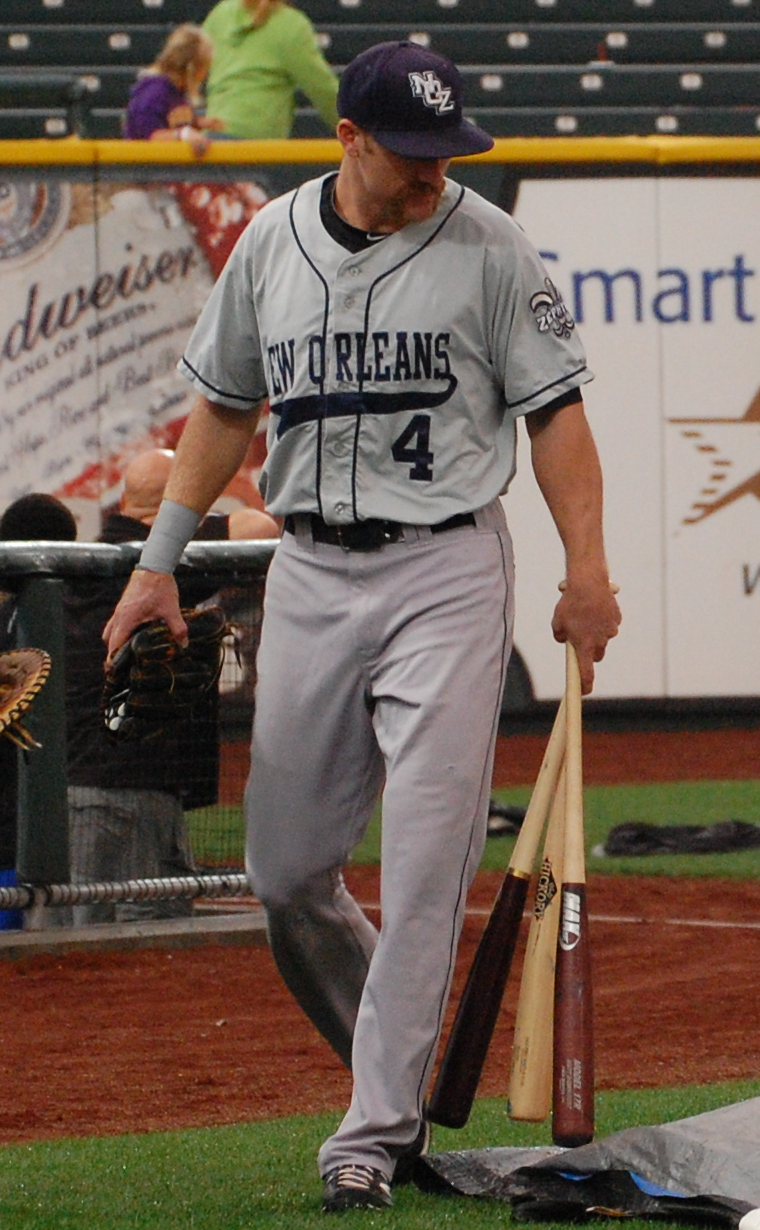
Mattison during his tenure with the New Orleans Zephyrs, the Triple-A affiliate of the Miami Marlins, in 2012

Mattison was drafted by the Florida Marlins in the 28th round (838th overall) of the 2008 Major League Baseball draft. The Marlins assigned Mattison to the Arizona Fall League after the 2011 regular season, where he won the Dernell Stenson Sportsmanship Award. Mattison was added to the Marlins' 40-man roster on November 18, 2011, in order for him to be protected from the Rule 5 draft.

On May 11, 2012, Mattison was recalled to Miami after hitting .250 with three home runs and 13 RBI in 31 games for the Triple-A New Orleans Zephyrs. Mattison played in one game and recorded one at-bat, a pinch-hit groundout. On May 15, Mattison was optioned back to New Orleans. On May 24, Mattison was recalled to Miami after Austin Kearns was placed on the 15-day disabled list. He finished the season with the New Orleans Zephyrs. Mattison batted .241, with 23 doubles, six triples, 13 homers, 41 RBI, 44 walks, and 145 strikeouts in 482 at-bats He also stole 26 bases while being caught 12 times. Mattison played in 121 games with a .310 OBP, a .394 SLG, and a .704 OPS.

=== Milwaukee Brewers ===
On December 12, 2013, Mattison was selected by the Milwaukee Brewers in the minor league phase of the Rule 5 Draft. He made 91 appearances for the Triple-A Nashville Sounds, batting .212/.294/.387 with seven home runs, 29 RBI, and 13 stolen bases. Mattison was released by the Brewers organization on August 21, 2014.

=== Washington Nationals ===
On December 22, 2014, Mattison signed a minor league contract with the Washington Nationals. He made three appearances for the Triple-A Syracuse Chiefs, going 1-for-6 (.167) with one stolen base. Mattison was released by the Nationals organization on May 8, 2015.

== See also ==
- Rule 5 draft results
