= Augie Walsh =

American baseball player (1904-1985)

- Pitcher
- Born: August 17, 1904; Wilmington, Delaware
- Died: November 12, 1985 (aged 81); San Rafael, California
- Batted: Right Threw: Right

MLB debut
- October 2, 1927, for the Philadelphia Phillies

Last MLB appearance
- September 27, 1928, for the Philadelphia Phillies

MLB statistics
- Win–loss record: 4-10
- ERA: 6.05
- Strikeouts: 38
- Stats at Baseball Reference

Teams
- Philadelphia Phillies (1927–1928)

August Sothley "Augie" Walsh (August 17, 1904 – November 12, 1985) was an American professional baseball pitcher. Walsh played for the Philadelphia Phillies of Major League Baseball in 1924 and 1925. In 39 career games, he had a 4–10 record with a 6.05 ERA. He batted and threw right-handed.

Walsh was born in Wilmington, Delaware, and died in San Rafael, California.
