= Frank Walsh (baseball umpire) =

American baseball umpire (1905-1985)

- Born: July 25, 1905; Cambridge, Massachusetts, US
- Died: July 4, 1985 (aged 79); San Antonio, Texas, US
- Occupation: Umpire
- Years active: 1961–1963
- Employer: National League

Francis Daniel Walsh (July 25, 1905 – July 4, 1985) was an American professional baseball umpire who worked in 344 National League (NL) games between September 11, 1961, and September 29, 1963. Born in Cambridge, Massachusetts, Walsh was an arbiter in Organized Baseball for more than two decades and officiated in over 4,000 games. He was a United States Army veteran of World War II.

Walsh's umpire card in the archives of The Sporting News records that he began his pro career in the Class D Appalachian League in 1951. By 1957, he had worked his way to the Double-A Texas League. In 1961, with the National League on the verge of expanding from eight to ten teams, the Senior Circuit promoted Walsh to its umpiring corps. He made his major-league debut September 11 at Milwaukee County Stadium, stationed along the left-field foul line. Five days later, Walsh made his first appearance as home-plate umpire, calling balls-and-strikes at Forbes Field in a 6–3 St. Louis Cardinals victory over the Pittsburgh Pirates.

Walsh then spent all of 1962 and 1963 as an NL umpire; counting his 1961 service, he worked 87 career games behind the plate, 85 at first base, 78 at second, 91 at third, and four in left field. He ejected nine men over that time — five of them coaches or managers. His contract was not renewed for 1964 by NL president Warren Giles, but he returned to the Texas League, where he was honored for 4,000 games umpired at ceremonies at Arlington Stadium, then a minor-league park, in 1966.

Walsh settled in San Antonio during his umpiring days. He died there in 1985 at age 79 and is interred in Fort Sam Houston National Cemetery.
