= Ángel Salazar (baseball) =

Venezuelan baseball player (born 1961)

- Shortstop
- Born: November 4, 1961 (age 64); Anaco, Venezuela
- Batted: Right Threw: Right

MLB debut
- August 10, 1983, for the Montreal Expos

Last MLB appearance
- October 1, 1988, for the Chicago Cubs

MLB statistics
- Batting average: .212
- Home runs: 2
- Runs batted in: 59
- Stats at Baseball Reference

Teams
- Montreal Expos (1983–1984); Kansas City Royals (1986–1987); Chicago Cubs (1988)

Argenis Antonio Salazar Yepez (born November 4, 1961) is a Venezuelan former shortstop in Major League Baseball.

== Career ==
Salazar played for the Montreal Expos (1983–84), Kansas City Royals (1986–87) and Chicago Cubs (1988). He batted and threw right-handed.

Salazar, who was known by the nickname "Angel", was signed by Montreal as an amateur free agent in 1980. He made his debut in the 1983 season.

In a five-year career, Salazar had 188 hits, with 2 home runs and 59 RBI in 886 at bats.

== See also ==
- List of Major League Baseball players from Venezuela
