= Jeff Jefferson =

Jeff Jefferson may refer to:

- Jeff Jefferson (baseball)
- Jeff Jefferson (racing driver)
