= Leslie Green (baseball) =

American baseball player

Leslie "Chin" Green
- Outfielder
- Born: February 8, 1914; St. Louis, Missouri, U.S.
- Died: March 2, 1985 (aged 71); St. Louis, Missouri, U.S.
- Batted: Left Threw: Right

Negro league baseball debut
- 1939, for the St. Louis Stars

Last appearance
- 1946, for the Memphis Red Sox
- Stats at Baseball Reference

Teams
- St. Louis Stars/St. Louis–New Orleans Stars (1939–1940); New York Black Yankees (1942); Memphis Red Sox (1946)

Leslie Green (February 8, 1914 – March 2, 1985), nicknamed "Chin", was an American Negro league outfielder from 1939 to 1946.

A native of St. Louis, Missouri, Green attended Sumner High School. He made his Negro leagues debut in 1939 for the St. Louis–New Orleans Stars, and represented the Stars in the 1940 East–West All-Star Game.

Green spent two seasons in the Mexican League, playing for La Junta de Nuevo Laredo in 1940 and Carta Blanca in 1941.

Green died in St. Louis in 1985 at age 71.
